= Windeby (disambiguation) =

Windeby may refer to:

- Windeby: a municipality in Schleswig-Holstein, Germany
- Windeby I: the name given to a German set of ancient mummified human remains, found in 1952, named after where it was found.
- Windeby II, a second set of remains, found later in 1952 in the same area.
