= Damendorf Man =

German bog body

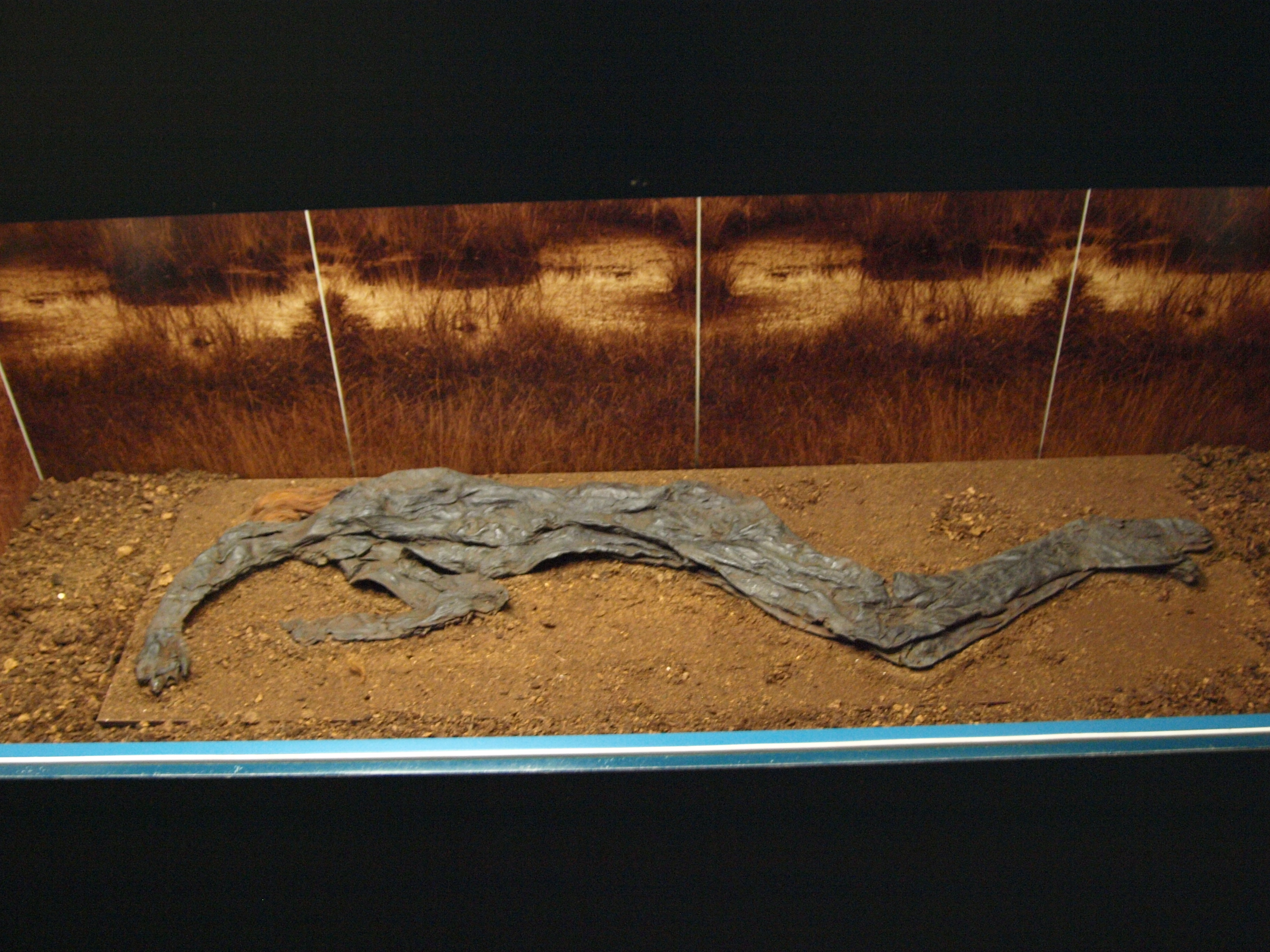
- Damendorf Man on display at the Archaeological State Museum at Schloss Gottorf
- Born: Unknown
- Died: Roman Iron Age; Seemoor near Damendorf, Schleswig-Holstein, Germany
- Body discovered: 28 May 1900; Seemoor near Damendorf, Schleswig-Holstein, Germany
- Resting place: Archaeological State Museum at Schloss Gottorf, Schleswig, Germany
- Known for: Exceptionally flattened and well-preserved bog body

Damendorf Man (German: Mann von Damendorf) is a Roman Iron Age bog body discovered on 28 May 1900 in the Seemoor near Damendorf, Schleswig-Holstein, northern Germany. The remains are notable for their extreme compression: the weight of the peat flattened most of the body to only a few centimetres thick, while preserving skin, hair, fingernails and other soft tissue.

Wool found with the body has been radiocarbon-dated to 135–335 CE, although researchers cautioned that contamination of the fragile sample could not be ruled out. Clothing and other items recovered with Damendorf Man included woollen breeches and puttees, leather shoes and a belt. Later examination using computed tomography revealed surviving bones and preserved brain tissue within the otherwise highly compressed remains.

== Discovery ==
Damendorf Man was discovered in the Seemoor, a peat bog located about 200 metres (660 ft) east of the village of Damendorf and roughly 1,500 metres (4,900 ft) northwest of Groß Wittensee, within the Hüttener Berge region of Schleswig-Holstein. The bog covers around 23 hectares (57 acres) and was historically used for cutting peat as a household fuel. Today it is a protected wetland and designated nature experience area, traversed by a circular trail of about 2.5 kilometres (1.6 mi).

On 28 May 1900, two peat cutters working on land owned by a local innkeeper named Hagge uncovered fragments of woollen clothing at a depth of roughly 2.5 to 3 metres (8.2 to 9.8 ft). As they continued digging, they exposed the body of a man preserved in the bog. The workers reported the find to the local headman, Sye, who passed the information to the district administrator, Freiherr von der Reck. Von der Reck immediately telegraphed the discovery to the Museum vaterländischer Alterthümer in Kiel. In response, museum curator Dr. Splieth and von der Reck travelled to Damendorf to examine and secure the remains.

After inspecting the find, they arranged to purchase it from Hagge. The body was carefully packed, transported to the museum, and arrived in Kiel on 1 June 1900, where conservators began the first stages of preservation.

Prior to the discovery of Damendorf Man, the remains of what are believed to be a woman were found in the same bog in 1884, although only the clothing survived. Another body, that of Damendorf Girl, dating to 810 BCE, was discovered in 1934.

== Condition ==
Damendorf Man is notable for the extreme compression of his remains. Over nearly two millennia, the accumulating weight of the peat gradually flattened him into a thin, almost two-dimensional silhouette. By the time he was discovered in 1900, only the toes retained their original three-dimensional form, while the remainder measured only a few centimetres in thickness.

Despite this extreme compression, the bog preserved much of his soft tissue. Large areas of leathery brown skin remained, together with his hair, fingernails, and clothing, while the acidic, oxygen-poor environment caused most of the skeleton to lose its mineral content and collapse. The skin bears numerous tears and splits, probably resulting from centuries of compression within the peat as well as handling during excavation and early conservation.

The head, torso, arms, and legs nevertheless remained in their original anatomical positions, allowing researchers to identify the body's orientation and interpret surviving internal structures despite its altered shape.

== Clothing and associated items ==
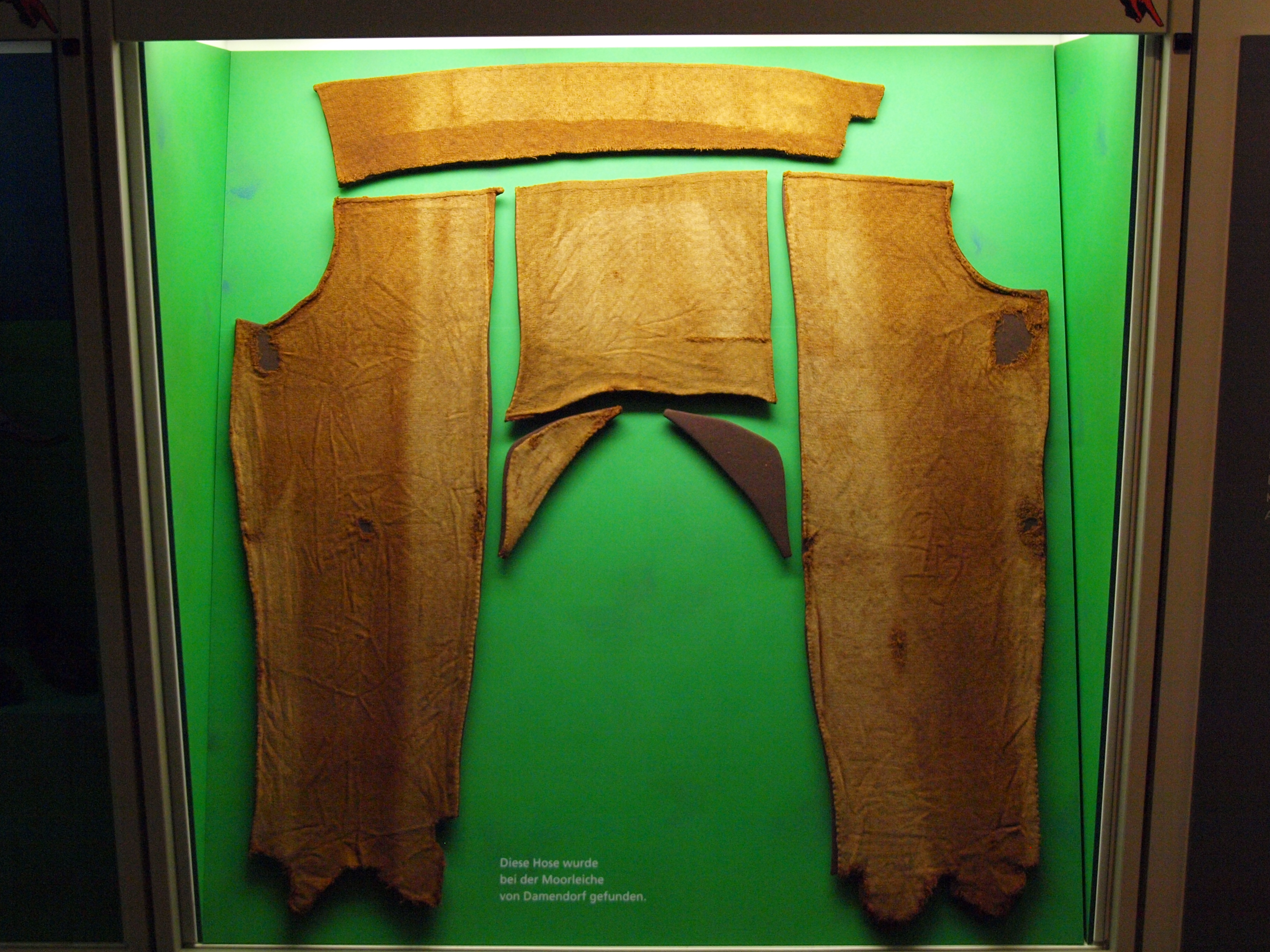
The surviving pieces of Damendorf Man's woollen breeches

When Damendorf Man was discovered on 28 May 1900, he was still wearing much of the clothing he had worn about 1,700–1,900 years earlier. His surviving garments included fragments of woollen breeches, woollen puttees wrapped around his lower legs, leather shoes, and a leather belt fastened around his waist. Together, these items form one of the most complete surviving examples of Roman Iron Age clothing from Schleswig-Holstein.

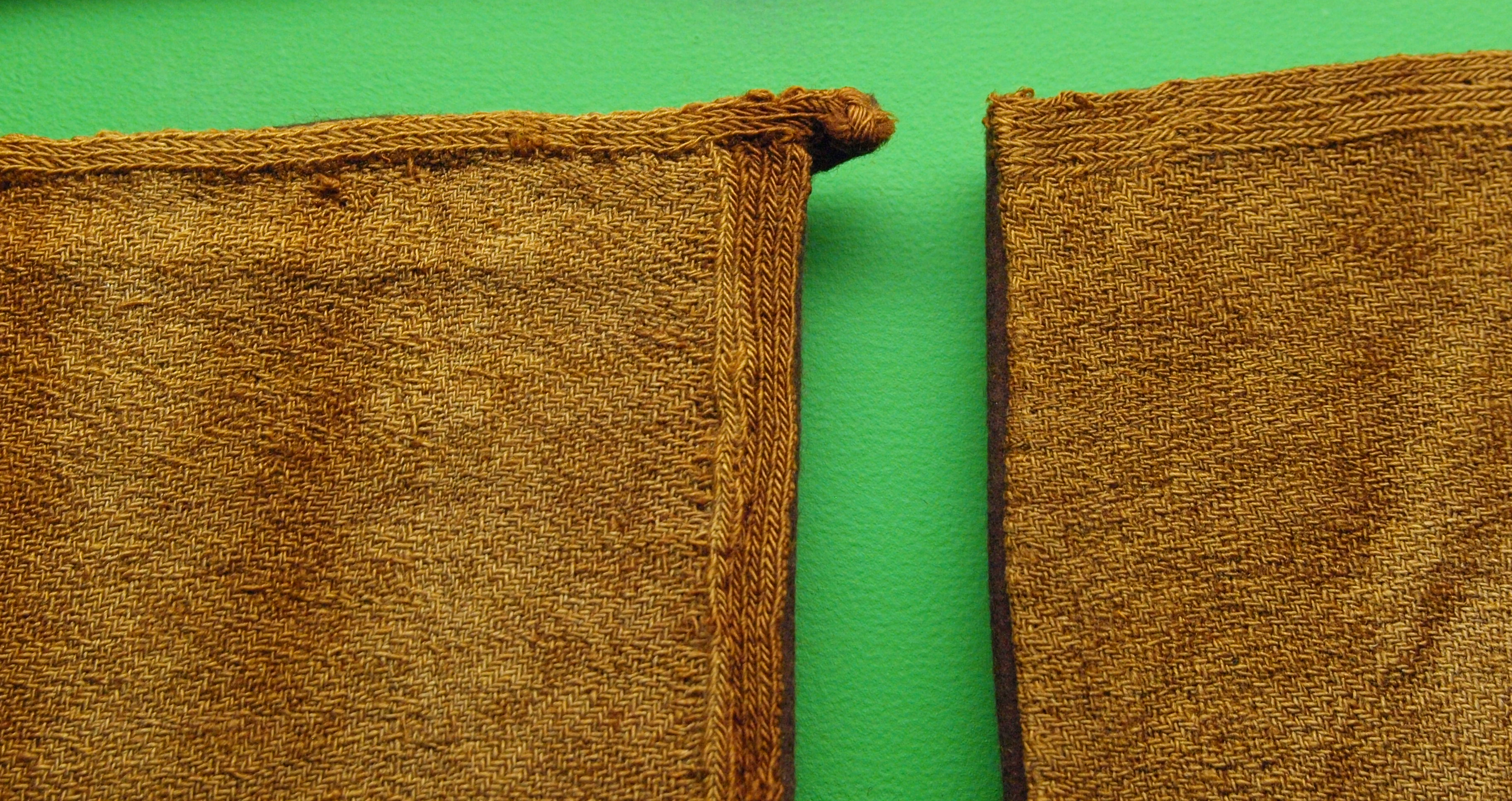
Tablet-woven edging on a fragment of the breeches

His woollen breeches were finished with decorative tablet-woven bands, a strong, tightly woven trim used to reinforce seams and edges. Studies of the surviving fragments have allowed researchers to reconstruct how his trousers were cut, sewn, and worn, providing valuable evidence of clothing-making techniques in northern Germany during the Roman Iron Age.

He also wore woollen puttees, long strips of cloth wrapped around the lower legs for warmth and support. The surviving pair provides evidence of how the lower legs were covered beneath the breeches during the Roman Iron Age.

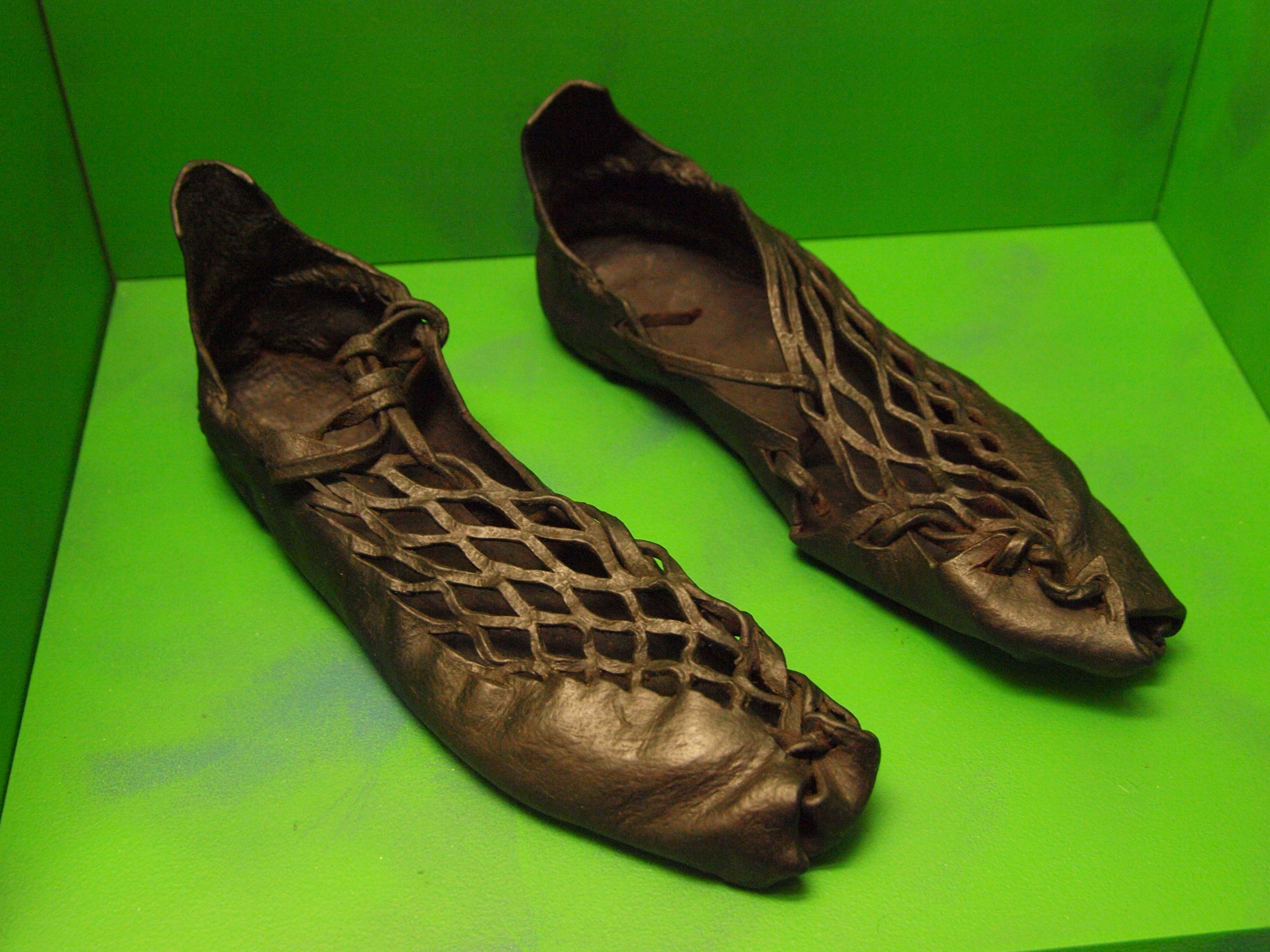
Damendorf Man's leather shoes, made from shaped pieces of leather fastened around the feet

His shoes were made from leather shaped and fastened around the feet. Similar forms of footwear have been recovered from other archaeological sites in northern Europe.

The leather belt remained fastened around his waist when the body was recovered. Because the garments survived with Damendorf Man rather than as isolated textile fragments, researchers have been able to reconstruct how his clothing was made, assembled, and worn during the Roman Iron Age.

== Scientific study ==
=== Dating ===
Damendorf Man dates to the Roman Iron Age in what is now northern Germany, when communities in the region lived beyond the borders of the Roman Empire. His date remained uncertain for much of the 20th century because the body was discovered in 1900, decades before radiocarbon dating became available.

Danish archaeologist P. V. Glob, known for his research on European bog bodies, dated Damendorf Man to about 300 BCE using archaeological comparisons. Later study of the clothing found with the body placed it more broadly in the pre-Roman or Roman Iron Age.

In 2004, Dutch physicist Johannes van der Plicht and Dutch archaeologist Wijnand van der Sanden, together with their colleagues, reported a radiocarbon date for a sample of wool from Damendorf Man's clothing. The sample produced an age of 1780 ± 45 BP (laboratory number GrA-507), calibrated to 135–335 CE, about 1,700–1,900 years ago.

The researchers cautioned that the wool was too fragile to undergo the full chemical treatment normally used to remove contaminants before testing. Only the acid stage could be completed, so residual contamination could not be ruled out. Although the result agreed with the Iron Age date suggested by the clothing, its reliability could not be fully established. The 135–335 CE range therefore directly dates the wool sample rather than establishing an exact date for Damendorf Man's death.

=== Health and injuries ===
Later examination showed that more of Damendorf Man's body had survived than could be seen from the outside. His remains had been compressed almost flat during nearly 2,000 years in the peat, and researchers had long believed that little or none of his skeleton remained. Computed tomography (CT), however, revealed five vertebrae from his lower back, his pelvis and both thigh bones. The surviving bones had been severely compressed, with some reduced to about the thickness of a fingernail.

The scans also revealed preserved brain tissue inside his flattened skull. Although the brain had shrunk to only a few inches in length and about 0.5 inches (1.3 cm) in thickness, it remained sufficiently well preserved for its two hemispheres to be distinguished. Researchers were able to use the CT data to produce a three-dimensional replica of the preserved brain.

Re-examination also changed the interpretation of injuries on his body. Earlier investigators believed that Damendorf Man had suffered between 15 and 20 stab wounds, but later study could not confirm most of the openings in his skin as injuries inflicted around the time of his death. Some were identified as tears caused when the preserved skin dried after the body was removed from the bog.

One wound in the area of the heart was confirmed during a later examination and has been interpreted as a possible stab wound. Researchers have therefore suggested that Damendorf Man may have suffered a single stab to the heart rather than the numerous wounds described in earlier accounts.

Researchers also analysed Damendorf Man's preserved hair. Chemical analysis found unusually high concentrations of mercury and lead, which Gill-Robinson suggested may reflect exposure during the working or gilding of gold or silver. She cautioned, however, that the available evidence was insufficient to identify his occupation with certainty.

== Exhibition ==
Damendorf Man is held by the Museum für Archäologie Schloss Gottorf at Gottorf Castle in Schleswig, northern Germany. He is one of five bog-body finds that formed part of the museum's permanent archaeological exhibition. The others are the Windeby child, Rendswühren Man, the Osterby head and Dätgen Man.

Gottorf Castle closed for renovation and modernization in 2025. Damendorf Man was subsequently transported about 200 kilometres (120 mi) north to Museum Silkeborg in Silkeborg, central Denmark, together with the Windeby child, Rendswühren Man and the Osterby head. The remains were transported in specially designed climate-controlled containers. The preserved hair of Dätgen Man was also sent to Denmark, but the rest of his body was considered too fragile to transport.

The remains went on display at Museum Silkeborg on 8 October 2025 as part of Die Schläfer im Moor ("The Sleepers in the Bog"), an exhibition bringing together bog bodies from northern Germany and Denmark. The exhibition is scheduled to continue until 22 October 2028. Damendorf Man and the other finds from Schloss Gottorf are expected to return to Germany after the museum's renovation is completed.

== See also ==
- List of bog bodies
