= List of bog bodies =

This is a list of bog bodies. Bog bodies, or bog people, are the naturally preserved corpses of humans and some animals recovered from peat bogs. The bodies have been most commonly found in the northern European countries of Denmark, Germany, the Netherlands, the United Kingdom, and Ireland. Reports of bog bodies surfaced during the early 18th century.

In 1965, the German scientist Alfred Dieck catalogued more than 1,850 bog bodies, but later scholarship revealed much of Dieck's work was erroneous. Hundreds of bog bodies have been recovered and studied, although it is believed that only around 45 remain intact today.

== How to use this list ==
- There may be more than one name in the "name" category, which may also be used to show alternate spellings for names of the bog body.
- The location category shows the city or state in which the bog body was discovered, although some bog bodies are discovered on borders between countries.
- The carbon-14 dating is used to determine an age range based on examination of the half lives of carbon isotopes.
- The "sex" category describes whether the find was male, female, or undetermined.
- The "description" category depicts examination details as well as physical characteristics of the body. Some sections may state Little is published about this find, meaning that there is little or no sufficient information published about the bog body.

== List ==
Name	Location	Country	Age (carbon-14 dating)	Sex	Year discovered	Image	Notable for
Arden Woman; Bredmose Woman	Himmerland	Denmark	1400 BCE	Female	1942	Hair of the Arden Woman	Elaborately arranged hair and sprang bonnet.
Auning Woman	Midtjylland	Denmark	1st century BC/AD	Female	1886	Auning Woman	Wool and skin garments; sticks placed over the body.
Borremose Man; Borre Fen Man	Himmerland	Denmark	700 BCE	Male	1946		Crushed skull; rope around neck.
Borremose II	Himmerland	Denmark	400 BCE	Presumed Female	1947		Fractured skull; clothing and infant bones.
Borremose III; Borremose Woman	Himmerland	Denmark	750 BCE	Female	1948		Apparent injuries later identified as postmortem damage.
Elling Woman	Silkeborg	Denmark	280 BCE	Female	1938	Head of Elling Woman	Hanging; elaborate 90-centimeter braid.
Frær Mose Foot; Frærmose Woman	Fræer	Denmark	Undetermined	Male	1842		Preserved foot; initially identified as female.
Gadevang Man	Zealand	Denmark	480–60 BCE	Male	1940		Evidence of trepanation.
Grauballe Man	Jutland	Denmark	290 BCE	Male	1952		Fingerprints recovered from preserved fingers.
Haraldskær Woman; Haraldskjaer Woman	Jutland	Denmark	500–401 BCE	Female	1835		Historically misidentified as Queen Gunnhild.
Huldremose Woman; Huldre Fen Woman; Huldre Woman	Ramten, Midtjylland	Denmark	160 BCE – 340 CE	Female	1879		Exceptionally preserved clothing.
Nederfrederiksmose body Kraglund Man; Frederiksdal Man	Nordjylland	Denmark	1040–1155 AD	Presumed male	1898		First bog body photographed before removal.
Koelbjerg Man	Syddanmark	Denmark	8000 BCE	Male	1941		Among the oldest known bog remains.
Porsmose Man	Zealand	Denmark	2600 BCE	Male	1946		Fatal arrow wounds.
Rappendam Woman	Frederiksborg	Denmark	160 BCE	Female	1941–1942		Wooden wheels found with the remains.
Roum Man formerly Roum Woman	Himmerland	Denmark	Iron Age	Male	1942		Severed head; initially identified as female.
Sigersdal Skeletons	Zealand	Denmark	3650–3140 BCE	Presumed male	1949		Two young people; traumatic skull injury.
Søgårds Mose Man (I)	Jutland	Denmark	356 BCE – 116 CE	Male	1942		Preserved clothing and footwear.
Søgårds Man (II)	Jutland	Denmark			1944		Only the arms and legs preserved.
Sorø Skeletons	Lolland	Denmark	3500 BCE	Male	1942		Deformities and evidence of surgery.
Stidsholt Woman; Stidsholtmose Woman; Stidsholt Fen Woman	Jutland	Denmark	Undetermined	Female	1859		Severed head with long preserved hair.
Tollund Man	Silkeborg	Denmark	400 BCE	Male	1950		Exceptionally preserved face; noose.
Valmose bodies	Jutland	Denmark	380 BCE and 225–230 BCE	Female	Unknown		Multiple human and animal remains.
Vester Thorsted Man	Vejle	Denmark	145–95 BCE	Male	1913		Leather cloak.
Vittrup Man	Vittrup	Denmark	3100–3300 BCE	Male	1915		Repeated blows to the head; long-distance migration.
Ahlintel Man	North Rhine-Westphalia	Germany	Undetermined	Male	1794		
Girl of the Bareler Moor	Lower Saxony	Germany	260–395 CE	Female	1784		Only skin from the right side of the chest survives.
Bentstreek leg Bentstreek foot	Lower Saxony	Germany	80–210 CE	Undetermined	1955		Preserved leg and foot thought to have lain above ground for months before discovery.
Bernuthsfeld Man	Lower Saxony	Germany	680–775 CE	Male	1907	Front of Bernuthsfeld Man's tunic	Heavily patched tunic made from 45 pieces of 20 different fabrics.
Borsteler Moor body	Lower Saxony	Germany	Undetermined	Undetermined	1921		
Bremervörde Gnattenbergswiesen body	Lower Saxony	Germany	634–689 CE	Presumed female	1934		Incomplete early medieval bog skeleton.
Bunsoh Man; Bunsoh body	Schleswig-Holstein	Germany	560–620 CE	Male	1890	Reconstruction	Wool textile and numerous birch branches found with the body.
"Bog Dog"; Bog dog from Burlage	Lower Saxony	Germany	1477–1611 CE	Male	1953		Animal bog body with preserved reddish fur and a largely intact skeleton.
Damendorf I Damendorf Woman	Schleswig-Holstein	Germany	Pre-Roman Iron Age	Presumed female	1884		Only the clothing survives.
Damendorf Man; Damendorf II	Schleswig-Holstein	Germany	300 BCE	Male	1900		Flattened by the weight of the peat; hair, skin, nails and clothing survived.
Damendorf Girl	Schleswig-Holstein	Germany	810 BCE	Female	1934		Approximately 14 years old; found with clothing.
Dätgen I	Schleswig-Holstein	Germany	Iron Age	Undetermined	1906		Only the clothing survives.
Dätgen Man	Schleswig-Holstein	Germany	135–385 CE	Male	1959	His Suebian knot hairstyle	Stabbed, beaten and decapitated; preserved Suebian knot hairstyle.
Esterweger Dose Child	Lower Saxony	Germany	1164 CE	Undetermined	1939		Completely skeletonized; only some bones survive.
Getelo bodies	Lower Saxony	Germany	Undetermined	One male and two females	1857		Three individuals found together.
Hesel bodies	Lower Saxony	Germany	Undetermined	Female	1914		
Hogenseth Man	Lower Saxony	Germany	Undetermined	Male	1920		Aged approximately 40–60; remains destroyed shortly after discovery.
Hunteburg Foot	Lower Saxony	Germany	1215–1300 CE	Undetermined	1938		Preserved foot found with a long-shafted boot.
Hunteburg Men; Hunteburg I and II; Grossenmoor Men	Lower Saxony	Germany	245–450 CE	Male	1949		Two men found together wrapped in cloaks; bodies lost during conservation.
Hunteburg III	Lower Saxony	Germany	40 BCE – 70 CE	Male	1949		
Husbäke I	Lower Saxony	Germany	1000–300 BCE	Male	1931		Remains deteriorated and were destroyed in the 1950s.
Husbäke Man; Husbäke II	Lower Saxony	Germany	57–420 CE	Male	1936		Aged approximately 20–25; intestinal contents and facial reconstruction studied.
Johann Spieker; Jan Spieker	Lower Saxony	Germany	1828 CE	Male	1978	Remains of his jacket, buttons and coins	Identified as a hawker who disappeared in the Goldenstedter Moor.
Jührdenerfeld Man; Bockhornerfeld Man	Lower Saxony	Germany	400 BCE – 1 CE	Male	1934		Wool fabric and an animal-skin cape found with the body.
Kayhausen Boy	Lower Saxony	Germany	300–400 BCE	Male	1922		Child aged approximately 7–10; bound and repeatedly stabbed.
Kreepen Man; Brammer Man; Kreepen-Brammer Man	Lower Saxony	Germany	1440–1625 CE	Male	1903		Remains destroyed during the Second World War; later dated from surviving hair.
Landegge Man	Lower Saxony	Germany	Undetermined	Male	1861		
Marx-Sapelstein Woman	Lower Saxony	Germany	Undetermined	Female	1861		
Neu England Man	Lower Saxony	Germany	140–320 CE	Male	1941	Upper body of Neu England Man	Aged approximately 40–50.
Neu Versen Man "Roter Franz"	Lower Saxony	Germany	220–430 CE	Male	1900		Red hair and beard; throat wound, arrow wound and broken shoulder.
Obenaltendorf Man	Lower Saxony	Germany	380 CE	Male	1895	Clothing of the Obenaltendorf Man	Clothing and a pair of silver objects survived despite poor preservation of the body.
Oberdorla Woman	Thuringia	Germany	Undetermined	Female	1959–1964		
Osterby Man	Schleswig-Holstein	Germany	70–220 CE	Male	1948		Severd head with a preserved Suebian knot hairstyle.
Pangerfilze Man	Bavaria	Germany	1700–1800 CE	Male	1927		No remains survive.
Woman of Peiting; Peiting Woman; "Rosalinde"	Bavaria	Germany	1290–1370 or 1380–1440 CE	Female	1957		Found in a wooden coffin.
Possendorf body	Thuringia	Germany	Undetermined	Undetermined	1959		
Rendswühren Man	Schleswig-Holstein	Germany	50 CE	Male	1871	Face of Rendswühren Man	Fatal head injury; body was smoked after discovery as a preservation method.
Rieper Moor body	Lower Saxony	Germany	253–348 CE	Undetermined	1751		Body lost; surviving clothing was later dated.
Röst Girl	Schleswig-Holstein	Germany	200 BCE – 80 CE	Female	1926		Approximately three years old; body destroyed during the Second World War, leaving the cloak for dating.
Rübke body	Lower Saxony	Germany	Undetermined	Undetermined	1914		
Schalkholz body	Schleswig-Holstein	Germany	Undetermined	Undetermined	1640		First recorded bog-body discovery in the list.
Schwerinsdorf Man	Lower Saxony	Germany	Undetermined	Male	1961		
Sedelsberger boy Sedelsberger Dose Man	Lower Saxony	Germany	1040–1210 CE	Male	1939		Skeletonized individual under 16, initially identified as an adult woman.
Spelle bodies	Lower Saxony	Germany	Undetermined	Two males, two females	1921		Four individuals.
Sudmentzhausen body	Lower Saxony	Germany	Undetermined	Undetermined	1881		
Girl of the Uchter Moor "Moora"	Lower Saxony	Germany	764–515 BCE	Female	2000		Aged approximately 17–19; preserved hand and skeleton recovered five years apart.
Uphuser Klümoor Woman I	Lower Saxony	Germany	27 BCE – 393 CE	Presumed female	1759		Clothing, plaited hair, bronze ornaments and a pot recorded with the now-lost body.
Uphuser Klümoor Woman II	Lower Saxony	Germany	Undetermined	Female	1789		
Windeby I Windeby Girl	Schleswig-Holstein	Germany	41–118 CE	Male	1952	Upper body of Windeby I	Well-preserved body initially identified as female and later identified as male.
Windeby II; Windeby Man	Schleswig-Holstein	Germany	380–185 BCE	Male	1952		Found soon after Windeby I; hazel rod wrapped around the neck.
Amcotts Moor Woman	Lincolnshire, England	Great Britain	200–400 CE	Female	1747		Early recorded bog-body discovery; only her left shoe survives.
Grewelthorphe remains	Yorkshire, England	Great Britain	Undetermined	Undetermined	1850		Reportedly found in brightly coloured clothing; only fragments of the shoes survive.
Gunnister Man	Gunnister, Scotland	Great Britain	18th century	Male	1951		Complete set of clothing, including early examples of knitted fabric from Shetland.
Lindow Woman; Lindow I	Cheshire, England	Great Britain	250 CE	Female	1983		Skull initially mistaken for a recently murdered woman, prompting her husband to confess to the killing.
Lindow Man; Lindow II; "Pete Marsh"	Cheshire, England	Great Britain	2 BCE – 119 CE	Male	1984		Multiple injuries, including blows to the head and a chest wound; cord found around the neck.
Lindow III	Cheshire, England	Great Britain	Early Iron Age	Male	1987		Severed into more than 70 pieces by a peat-cutting machine; surviving tissue remained well preserved.
Prestatyn Child	Clwyd, Wales	Great Britain	90 CE	Undetermined	1984		Remains believed to be those of an infant.
Worsley Man	Manchester, England	Great Britain	131–251 CE	Male	1958		Decapitated man aged approximately 26–45; garrote remained around the neck.
Cladh Hallan Skeletons	South Uist, Scotland	Great Britain	1600–1120 BCE	Males and females	1988–2002		Prehistoric composite skeletons assembled from the remains of multiple individuals.
Ballgudden Woman	Ulster	Ireland	Undetermined	Female	1831		Blond hair; an infant was found nearby. Neither body survives.
Ballygroll Child	County Londonderry	Ireland	Undetermined	Undetermined	1835		Found completely enclosed in a coffin; body no longer survives.
Baronstown West Man	County Kildare	Ireland	242–388 CE	Male	1953		Textile and leather cloak; hazel or birch branches found with the body.
Ballymacombs More Woman; Bellaghy Boy	County Londonderry	Ireland	c. 300 BCE	Female	2023		Headless skeleton with surviving skin, nails and a kidney; initially investigated as a possible recent murder victim. Later identified as a woman aged 17–22.
Camnish Woman	County Londonderry	Ireland	Undetermined	Female	1834		Body no longer survives.
Cashel Man; Portlaoise body	County Laois	Ireland	2000 BCE	Male	2011		Early Bronze Age body; aged approximately 20–25, with a broken arm, spinal injuries and cuts.
Clonycavan Man	County Meath	Ireland	392–201 BCE	Male	2003		Preserved hair styled with an imported plant-oil resin; lower body missing.
Cloonshannagh Woman	County Roscommon	Ireland	645–680 CE	Female	2005		Completely skeletonized; body and clothing damaged by peat-cutting tools.
Derrycashel Woman	County Roscommon	Ireland	1431–1291 BCE	Female	2005		Nearly complete skeleton of a young woman; interpreted as a formal burial rather than a sacrifice.
Derrymaquirk Woman	County Roscommon	Ireland	750–200 BCE	Female	1959		Aged approximately 25; infant bone fragments found nearby. Interpreted as a formal burial.
Derryvarroge Man	County Kildare	Ireland	228–343 CE	Male	2006		Only the buttocks and a leg survive.
Drumkeeragh body	County Down	Ireland	Undetermined	Presumed female	1780		Skeleton found with clothing and hair; only a braided lock of hair and cloth fragments survive.
Gallagh Man	County Galway	Ireland	400–200 BCE	Male	1821		Willow rod around the neck; body pinned beneath the peat with two wooden stakes.
Kinakinelly Man	County Galway	Ireland	200–100 BCE	Male	1952		Found with red deer bones.
Meenybradden Woman	County Donegal	Ireland	1050–1410 CE	Female	1978		Radiocarbon date conflicts with the 16th–17th-century style of the cloak wrapped around the body.
Mulkeeragh Man	County Cork	Ireland	Undetermined	Male	1753		Found wearing a military uniform and cloak; later reburied.
Old Croghan Man; Croghan Man	County Offaly	Ireland	362–175 BCE	Male	2003		Exceptionally tall man; only the torso survives. Nipples had been cut and the hands showed little evidence of manual labour.
Stoneyisland Man; Stony Island Man	County Galway	Ireland	3320–3220 BCE	Male	1929		Ireland's oldest known bog body; initially mistaken for a recently missing man.
Aschbroeken Man	Drenthe	Netherlands	1376–1348 or 1316–928 BCE	Male	1931		Skeletal remains of a man aged about 35–45; his right upper arm had fractured and healed abnormally.
Emmer-Erfscheidenveen Man	Drenthe	Netherlands	1370–1365, 1315–1260 or 1235–1215 BCE	Male	1938		The oldest bog body with preserved soft tissue found in the Netherlands; associated clothing included a calfskin cape, woollen garment, fur cap and shoe.
Exloërmond Man	Drenthe	Netherlands	365–115 BCE	Male	1914		His last meal contained barley, millet and legumes; surviving beard stubble indicates that he was probably an adult man.
Kibbelgaarn body	Groningen	Netherlands	Undetermined	Male	1791		The remains were bought, pulverised and sold as a cheaper substitute for Egyptian mummia.
Weerdinge Men Nieuw-Weerdinge Men; Weerdinge Couple	Drenthe	Netherlands	40 BCE–50 CE	Male	1904		Two men found together, with unusually well-preserved skin and internal organs.
Wijster bodies Wijster Four	Drenthe	Netherlands	c. 1600 CE	Male	1901		Four individuals who all died before age 25; associated finds included clothing, coins and a bronze cauldron, while only a few human remains survive.
Yde Girl	Drenthe	Netherlands	40 BCE–50 CE	Female	1897		About 16 years old at death and strangled with a woollen band; she became widely known through a reconstruction of her face.
Zweeloo Woman	Drenthe	Netherlands	78–233 CE	Female	1951		The oldest known patent human infection with the lancet liver fluke Dicrocoelium dendriticum; roundworm and whipworm eggs were also identified.
Dąbrówka body	Kuyavian-Pomeranian Voivodeship	Poland	Undetermined	Undetermined	1936		
Dröbnitz Girl	Warmian-Masurian Voivodeship	Poland	650 BCE	Female	1939		Early Iron Age girl found with a cloak and wooden comb; her remains and grave goods were destroyed during World War II.
Karwinden Man	Warmian-Masurian Voivodeship	Poland	Undetermined	Male	1943		Examination of his intestinal contents found eggs of roundworm and whipworm.
Bocksten Man	Varberg, Hallands län	Sweden	1290–1430 CE	Male	1936		Exceptionally well-preserved medieval clothing, including a tunic, hood, cloak, hose and foot wraps.
Dannike Woman	Dannike, Västra Götalands län	Sweden	Undetermined	Female	1942		Late 17th-century woman found in a birch coffin with her hands bound; a clay tobacco pipe and brass tobacco box were among the objects buried with her.
Luttra Woman Hallonflickan; Raspberry Girl	Västra Götalands län	Sweden	3105–2935 BCE	Female	1943	Skull of Luttra Woman	Raspberry seeds found where her stomach had been, giving her the name Hallonflickan ("Raspberry Girl").
Bleivik Man	Rogaland	Norway	6110–5890 BCE	Male	1952		Among the oldest human remains found in Norway; represented by a skull and a small number of other bones.
Windover Skeletons	Florida	United States	6000–5000 BCE	Males and females	1982		168 burials, including exceptionally preserved brain tissue and perishable materials.
Little Salt Spring skeletons	Florida	United States	3200–4800 BCE	Males and females	Before 1979		Archaic cemetery estimated to contain about 1,000 burials, with exceptional preservation of organic remains.
Rabivere Woman	Rabivere	Estonia	Late 17th–early 18th century	Female	1936		Only known bog body from Estonia; preserved woollen clothing and a coin dated 1667.

== See also ==
- Egtved Girl, a barrow body in a coffin preserved by a bog
