= Woman of Zweeloo =

Bog body from the Netherlands

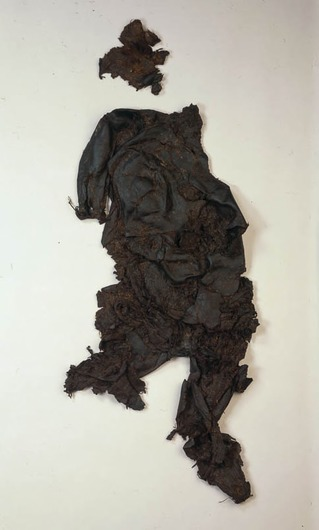
- Preserved remains in the Drents Museum
- Died: 78–233 CE (aged approximately 35–50)
- Resting place: Drents Museum, Assen, Netherlands
- Other name: Zweeloo Woman
- Known for: Bog body discovered on 5 December 1951 in Juffersveen bog near Zweeloo, Drenthe, Netherlands

The Woman of Zweeloo or Zweeloo Woman (Dutch: Vrouw van Zweeloo) was a woman from the 1st–3rd century CE whose remains were found as a bog body near Zweeloo, Drenthe, Netherlands, in 1951.

She was aged between 35 and 50 when she died. Much of her skin, bones and internal organs has been preserved, with some of the bones showing cuts from peat-diggers' tools.

== Discovery ==
The individual now known as the Woman of Zweeloo lay buried in the Juffersveen bog near Gelpenberg, close to the village of Zweeloo in the province of Drenthe, Netherlands, until she was discovered by peat cutters on 5 December 1951. She was lying about 45 centimetres (18 in) below the surface and was uncovered during commercial peat cutting. After realising that they had found human remains, the workers notified the mayor of Zweeloo, who called in specialists to document and recover her.

== Condition ==
When discovered on 5 December 1951, the Woman of Zweeloo was unclothed and lying face down, with her limbs drawn into a somewhat foetal position. Her remains included a nearly complete skeleton together with preserved skin and internal organs.

The body had already been disturbed and damaged by commercial peat cutting before specialists reached the site. Peat-cutting tools had cut through the front of the body and damaged some of the surviving bones.

== Clothing and associated items ==
No clothing, jewellery or other grave goods were found with her.

== Conservation ==
On 6 December 1951, the day after the Woman of Zweeloo was discovered, archaeologist Albert Egges van Giffen of the Biologisch-Archaeologisch Instituut (Institute for Biology and Archaeology) at Groningen University and his assistant, palaeobotanist Willem van Zeist, went to the find site. By the time they arrived, the peat cutters had already removed the body. Van Giffen and Van Zeist collected the surviving remains, placed them in a large zinc container and transported them to Groningen for further examination.

The remains were examined at the university's Laboratorium voor Anatomie en Embryologie (Laboratory for Anatomy and Embryology). Van Zeist reported in 1952 that anatomical examination had identified the remains as those of a woman.

The surviving skin, internal organs and other soft tissues were subsequently conserved using a glycerol treatment. The soft tissues remained in Groningen for more than three decades. In 1985, 34 years after the discovery, they were transferred to the Drents Museum in Assen, where the skeleton was already held.

== Scientific analysis ==
Figure showing the extent of her remains: pink area shows preserved soft tissue, surviving bones are shown with indications of cut marks, other bones are sketched in.

Before she was lifted from the bog, the specialists recorded where she lay and collected pollen samples from the surrounding peat. The samples were intended to help establish when she had been deposited and whether the natural layers of the bog had been disturbed. She was then placed in a zinc coffin and transported to the city of Groningen for conservation and study.

=== Age ===
The Woman of Zweeloo was an adult when she died. Early examinations produced several age estimates. The development of her long bones, pelvis and shoulder blade showed that she was at least 25 years old. Examination of the joint at the front of the pelvis suggested an age between 30 and 60, while the sutures of the skull suggested an age between 20 and 30. Microscopic examination of her left thigh bone produced an estimate of 34 ± 7 years.

Later examination of her bones and teeth placed her age between about 35 and 50 years.

=== Height ===
Estimates of the Woman of Zweeloo's height have varied considerably. In 1952, her height was estimated at about 170 centimetres (5 ft 7 in). A later calculation based on surviving bones produced an estimate of about 138 centimetres (4 ft 6 in).

Researchers cautioned that estimates based on her bones were unreliable. The remains had shrunk and changed shape after burial, with deformation affecting parts of the pelvis, heel bones and femora, and her unusual limb proportions also complicated calculations based on bone length. Later estimates included about 152 centimetres (5 ft 0 in). Measurements of the preserved body during the 2009–2011 investigation produced an estimate of about 155 centimetres (5 ft 1 in).

=== Body proportions and skeleton ===
The Woman of Zweeloo had unusually short forearms and lower legs. Her upper arms and thighs were of approximately normal length, while the middle sections of her limbs were disproportionately short. The difference was greatest in her arms. Her upper arms were about 2.2 times the length of her radii, compared with a ratio of about 1.4 in the reference population used by researchers.

Both radii were shortened and bowed. Her lower legs were also short in relation to her thighs, although the difference was less pronounced. Researchers also recorded marked bowing of the right thigh bone and fibula. Her hands and feet were of normal size. Changes in the bones of her feet were interpreted as possibly resulting from an abnormal gait.

Some differences between the left and right sides of her skeleton were initially attributed to changes that occurred after death. In 1994, pathologist R. W. Stoddart concluded that although some of the asymmetry was caused by changes after burial, the shortened forearms and lower legs had been present during life. He considered dyschondrosteosis the most likely explanation.

Between 2009 and 2011, researchers re-examined the remains using CT scans and other methods. They identified shortening and bowing of the radii and shortening of the lower legs relative to the thighs, a pattern known as mesomelia. They concluded that the skeletal features provided probable evidence of Léri–Weill dyschondrosteosis, a rare disorder affecting bone growth. At the time of the study, only three probable or possible cases had been reported in pre-modern populations. The researchers proposed genetic testing to investigate the diagnosis further.

=== Parasites ===
The Woman of Zweeloo was infected with three species of parasitic worm. In a study published in 2013, biological researcher Nicole Searcey and colleagues examined her preserved intestine and liver. They found eggs of roundworm (Ascaris lumbricoides) and whipworm (Trichuris trichiura), both intestinal parasites, in just 0.1 millilitres of sediment washed from a section of her intestine. In thin sections of her liver, they also identified eggs of the lancet liver fluke (Dicrocoelium dendriticum), a small parasitic flatworm that causes an infection called dicrocoeliasis.

Finding the fluke eggs in her liver established that she had been infected during her lifetime. Someone who eats an infected animal's liver can pass fluke eggs in their faeces without becoming infected themselves. In the Woman of Zweeloo, however, the eggs were present in her own liver rather than simply passing through her intestine. The researchers described her case as the oldest known confirmed human infection with this parasite at the time of the study.

Lancet liver flukes usually infect grazing animals such as cattle. People become infected by accidentally swallowing ants carrying the parasite's larvae, which may be present on food or in drinking water. The flukes then settle in the liver and bile ducts, the passages that carry bile from the liver to help digest food.

=== Dating ===
In 1952, palaeobotanist Willem van Zeist examined the pollen evidence associated with the Woman of Zweeloo. He took a pollen sample from between the toes of her undamaged foot and concluded that she had lived in the first centuries CE. In 1956, Van Zeist reported that the body had been deposited in an old peat cutting and estimated that the deposition had taken place after 200 CE.

Both the preserved skin and skeleton were later radiocarbon dated. The skin produced a date of 1835 ± 40 BP and the skeleton 1940 ± 70 BP. The average of the two dates was 1861 ± 35 BP, calibrated at 95% probability to 78–233 CE, placing the Woman of Zweeloo in the Roman period.

== Deposition ==
In 1956, palaeobotanist Willem van Zeist reported that pollen analysis of the peat associated with the Woman of Zweeloo showed a break in the natural sequence of peat layers. Younger Subatlantic peat lay directly above much older Boreal peat. Van Zeist concluded that the body had been placed in an old peat cutting, which accounted for the gap in the pollen sequence.

== See also ==
- List of bog bodies
