= Woman of Peiting =

Late-medieval bog body found in Bavaria

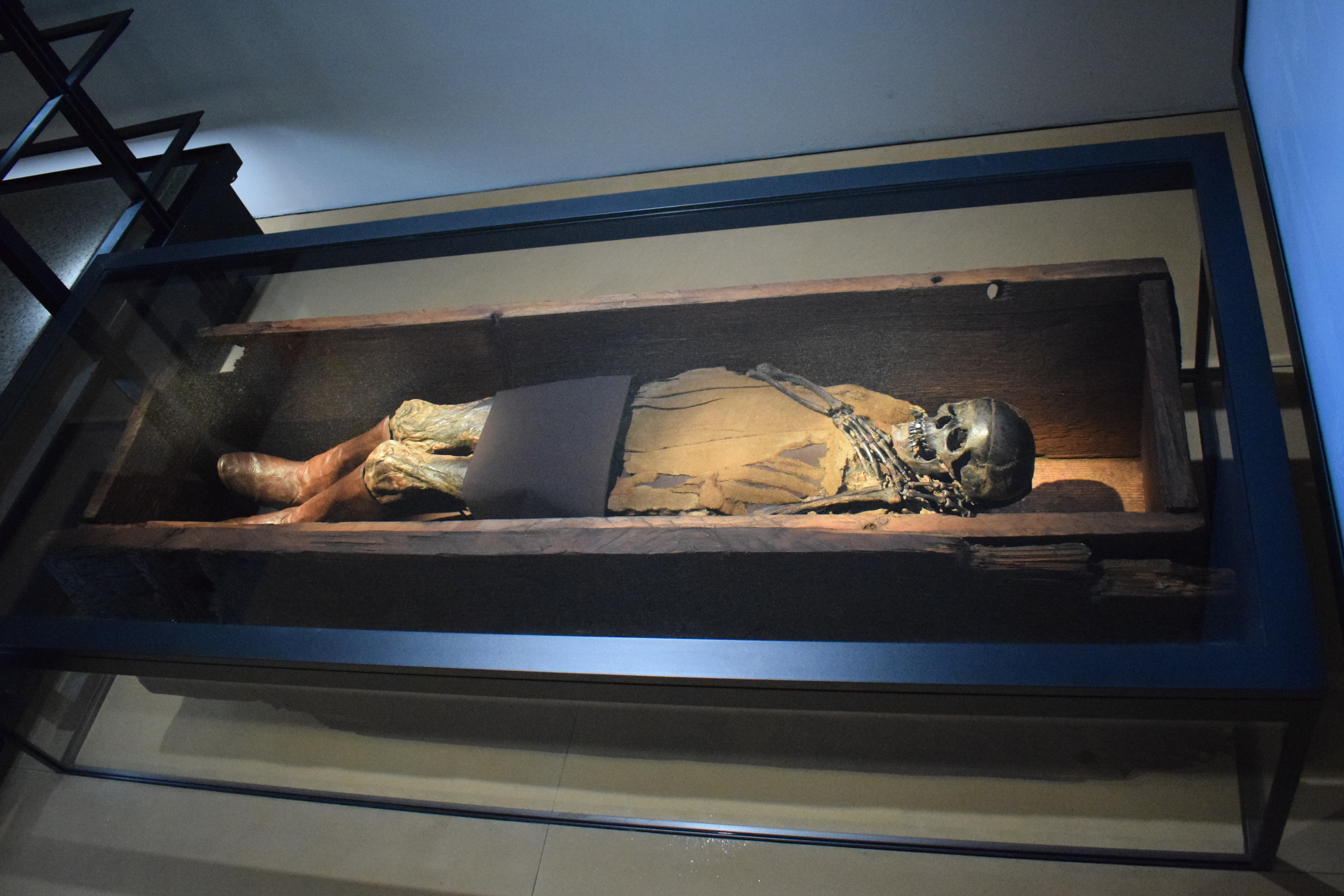
- Preserved remains of the Woman of Peiting
- Born: Unknown
- Died: 1290–1370 or 1380–1440 CE
- Body discovered: 23 July 1957; Weiter Filz, Hohenpeißenberg, Bavaria, West Germany
- Known for: Bog body found in a wooden coffin
- Height: 152 cm (5 ft 0 in) (estimated)

The Woman of Peiting (German: Frau von Peiting) is a late-medieval bog body discovered in 1957 in the Weiter Filz, a raised bog near Peiting in Upper Bavaria, Germany. Radiocarbon dating places her death in either 1290–1370 or 1380–1440 CE. She was approximately 20–30 years old and was estimated to have been about 152 cm (5 ft 0 in) tall.

The Woman of Peiting was buried in a substantial wooden coffin, which protected her remains from compression that is often caused by the surrounding peat. Her skeleton survived nearly complete, together with soft tissue, a woollen dress, a hairband and well-preserved knee-high leather boots. The position of her body, with arms crossed over her chest, has been described as consistent with Christian burial practice, however it is unclear why she was buried alone in the bog rather than a cemetery.

The Woman of Peiting is displayed by the Archäologische Staatssammlung in Munich.

== Discovery ==
The individual who became known as the Woman of Peiting was discovered on 23 July 1957 in a bog in the Weiter Filz, an area in Upper Bavaria, southern Germany. The area was commercially harvested for peat from 1923 to 1990.

Samuel Gunsch was operating an excavator when he hit a wooden box embedded in the bog. Thinking it might be a treasure chest Gunsch stopped, but the excavator had already broken through one corner of the lid. Looking inside he saw human remains, which he reported to his manager. The coffin was covered with peat to prevent it from drying while they waited for the authorities.

The following day, 24 July, the Bavarian State Office for Monument Protection in Munich became involved and technician Wilfried Titze began an excavation that continued for several days, but nothing else was found.

Karl Schlabow of the Textile Museum in Neumünster was tasked with overseeing the recovery and conservation of the remains. The woman's body and coffin were enclosed in a protective wooden casing, packed with soft peat to prevent drying, and transported to Neumünster.

Titze returned in the autumn of 1962, five years after the initial discovery. He again explored the area, but there were no additional finds.

== Condition ==
The Woman of Peiting was well preserved and her skeleton survived almost completely. Significant areas of the torso and upper legs retained soft tissue and adipose tissue, but the face, hands beneath the chin and parts of the breasts had become more exposed.

Many bodies deposited directly in peat become severely compressed, however the wooden coffin protected the woman from the pressure of the overlying bog, allowing the skeleton to retain its general form. Due to demineralisation from the bog environment, the bones had become soft and flexible over time and conservation and drying, they became considerably lighter. Fat beneath the skin had been converted into adipocere, a wax-like substance that sometimes forms during decomposition.

The woman's skin was tanned by the acidic bog environment. Numerous cuts were visible on the body, however, they were the result of the 1957 autopsy rather than injuries sustained during her lifetime.

== Clothing and associated items ==
=== Clothing ===
When the Woman of Peiting was buried she wore a woolen dress. In the late 1950s, German textile archaeologist Karl Schlabow reconstructed the outer garment as being approximately knee-length and made from light-coloured, fine sheep's wool. The fabric was folded at both the front and back, with folds sewn below the shoulders that widened towards the hem. The wool had become stained brown by its time in the bog.

Fragments of a second, lightweight woolen fabric were discovered around the lower body, crotch and thighs. These were interpreted as potentially being an undergarment resembling trousers

Traces of fabric were also found on the floor of the coffin and on the woman's body. Schlabow believed the fabric was linen, possibly from an undergarment, but this was never confirmed.

=== Hairband ===
The woman's hair was held by a two-coloured tablet-woven band about 18 mm (0.71 in) wide. Tablet weaving is a technique that involves passing threads through small cards or tablets that are turned, which produces a narrow patterned band. Two sections of the hairband survive, measuring 37 cm (15 in) and 23 cm (9.1 in). Apart from the hairband, no ornaments or jewelery were found in the coffin.

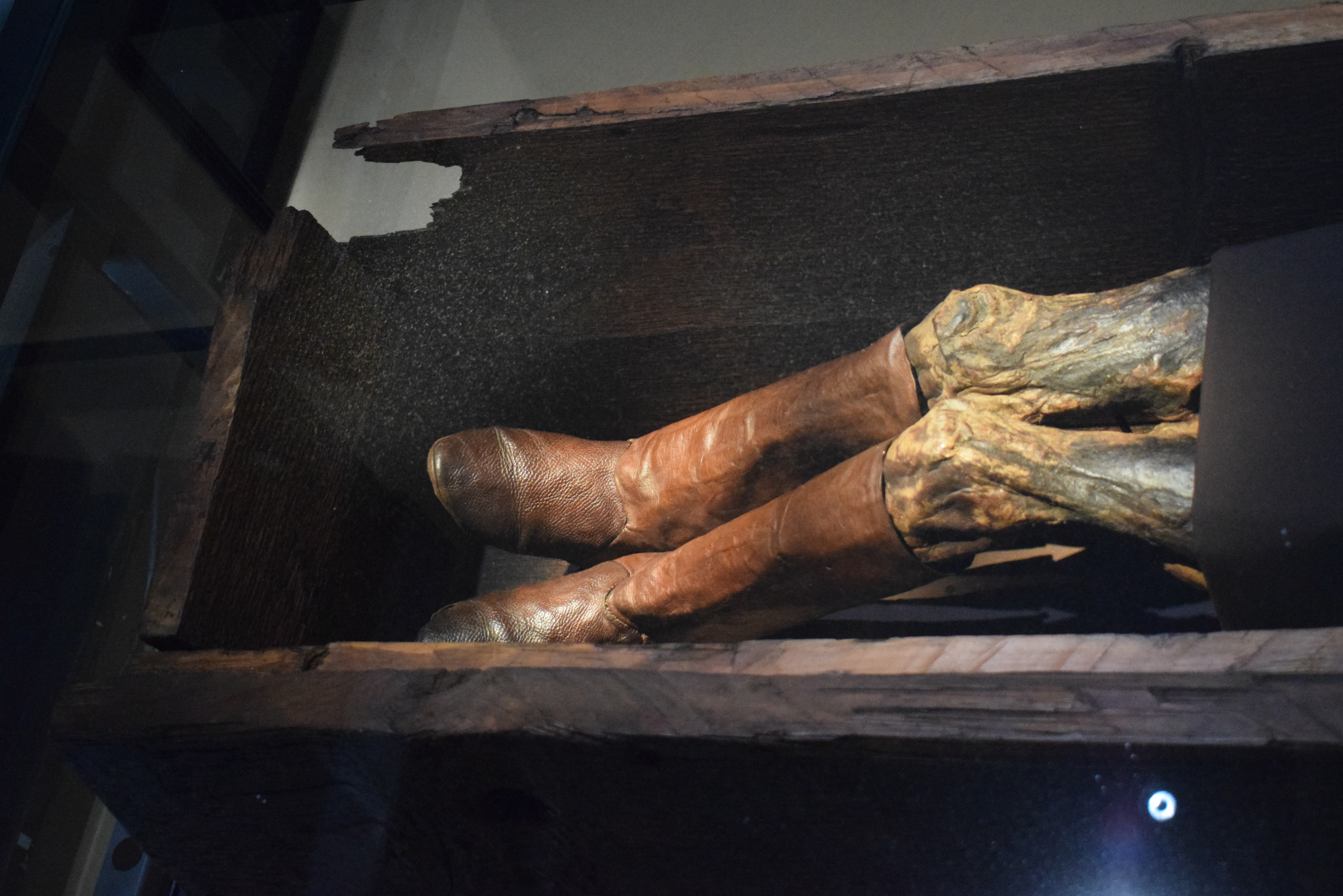
The Woman of Peiting's knee-high leather boots. Wear and a patch on the right boot show that they had been used during her lifetime.

=== Boots ===
When her coffin was discovered in the bog the Woman of Peiting was wearing knee-high leather boots, which remained remarkably well-preserved.

The shafts were made of soft, flexible goatskin, while the soles, vamps and heel reinforcements were made from more cattle leather, which is more durable. Each sole measures about 23 cm (9.1 in), roughly a modern European size 36.

The boots show clear signs of regular use and the right boot had been repaired with a patch during the woman's lifetime. According to the Archäologische Staatssammlung, the wear and repair are evidence she wore the boots while she was alive, rather than being made specifically for burial.

Women are rarely shown wearing knee-high boots in surviving medieval images, however, the discovery of the Peiting Woman has been taken by the Archäologische Staatssammlung that women did indeed wear this type of footwear during the period. The museum suggests that this type of boot would have provided offered protection for riding or spending time outdoors.

== Burial and deposition ==
=== Deposition ===
When found, the coffin was aligned east to west, approximately 50 cm (20 in) below the surface of the bog. The woman's head lay at the eastern end, facing west. She lay on her back with her arms crossed over her chest with her left hand resting on top of her right.

=== Coffin ===
The coffin she was buried in was made of wood. It measured 183 cm (6 ft 0 in) long and 37 cm (15 in) high. It was about 34–36 cm (13–14 in) wide at the foot and 35–39 cm (14–15 in) wide at the head. The boards were 4–4.5 cm (1.6–1.8 in) thick.

Holes had been made near all four corners of the coffin about 3 cm (1.2 in) across. During the original investigation, remains of willow or bast fibres were found in the holes (bast is a product of certain trees which can be made into cordage.) The coffin also contained wood shavings. Although the coffin was originally thought to be pine, additional investigations in 2007 by wood scientists Mathias Rehbein, Gerald Koch and Peter Klein identified the coffin boards as Norway spruce (Picea abies) and the dowel as European ash (Fraxinus excelsior). According to the researchers, ash is well-suited to structural joints due to its strength. They interpreted its use for the dowels as deliberate selection of different woods for different parts of the coffin.

While spruce is a wood more prone to decay, the coffin was exceptionally well-preserved. Microscopic examination found slight bacterial deterioration of the spruce and while the ash dowel was more seriously decayed. Rehbein, Koch and Klein attributed the survival of the coffin to the acidic, oxygen-poor conditions of the bog, which restrict the organisms that normally destroy wood.

The condition of the coffin may also have been in a factor in the unusual preservation of the woman's body, which would more typically have been compressed by the pressure of the peat.

=== Interpretation ===
The woman was buried with her arms crossed. German archaeologist Brigitte Haas-Gebhard and forensic pathologist Klaus Püschel interpreted this position as being consistent with Christian burial practices, although why she was buried alone in the bog rather than in a conventional cemetery remains a mystery.

Schlabow, one of the original investigators, proposed that the coffin had originally been deliberately sunk in open water with the holes at its corners as attachment points for ropes weighted with stones. He suggested that the ropes at the head end decayed first, which caused coffin to rise before the remaining ropes failed and the coffin rose completely. According to Schlabow, this sequence explained why the woman's head and upper body were less well preserved than other parts.

Later investigators rejected his hypothesis because there were no suitable weighting stones found during either the original excavation in 1957 or the re-excavation in 1962. They suggested instead that the uneven preservation of the body was due to differences in the chemical composition of the bog .

== Conservation and preservation ==
=== 1957 examination and reconstruction ===
After the Woman of Peiting arrived at the Textile Museum in Neumünster in late July 1957, a forensic examination was conducted. The torso was opened, the internal organs were removed and preserved separately, and samples were sent to several scientific institutions for further study. German textile archaeologist Karl Schlabow began conservation work on 5 August 1957.

For approximately nine months, the woman was soaked in a bath of oak tanning material (Eichenlohe). Parts of the body were also treated with oil. After this treatment, the emptied torso was filled with material believed to be pieces of paper. The autopsy incision was sewn shut, the damaged areas of skin were filled and retouched, and she was put on display.

In addition to the preservation treatment, parts of her skeleton were replaced with metal supports and wooden elements where pieces were missing, including parts of her cervical spine. Loose bones were wired together and a number of missing teeth were replaced with artificial ones. Unfortunately, some bones and teeth were not returned to their original anatomical positions. To repair the skull, which had been sawn open during the autopsy, was restored with metal pins and glue, then joins were concealed with filler and paint.

The coffin also received conservation treatments. It was stabilised with methyl cellulose and then varnished with multiple coats. Parts of the coffin flour were covered with velour fabric as part of the museum display. As the boots had been found in several pieces, restorationists sewed them back together and treated them with Dégras leather dressing.

=== 2007 reassessment ===
In 2007, the Woman of Peiting was reexamined using contemporary techniques at the Archäologische Staatssammlung in Munich. This included radiology, forensic pathology, radiocarbon dating, textile analysis and wood biology. They also reconstructed the history of the 1957 excavation and conservation treatments.

Researchers were unable to find many of the samples taken during the original examinations, which limited the possibility for comparisions. They also discovered mould growing on the preserved skin, which was removed before further examination.

During the reassessment, researchers were able to distinguish features that resulted from the original medieval burial from those created during twentieth-century conservation activities. This allowed for the reinterpretation of several earlier conclusions about the woman's body and burial.

Portable X-ray fluorescence spectroscopy (pXRF) of the woman's skeleton detected chemical traces of the twentieth-century conservation. Anthropologist Guinevere Granite and archaeologist Andreas Bauerochse found unusually high concentrations of elements in the hands, wrists and forearms which corresponded to the metal wires and supports inserted in 1957 during her reconstruction.

=== Preservation of the coffin ===
Chemical analysis also revealed evidence of later conservation treatments. The velour fabric glued to the coffin floor during the 1957 reconstruction obscured parts of the original wooden joints, and researchers chose not to remove it because doing so risked damaging the coffin itself.

== Scientific analysis ==
=== Date ===
The original investigators tentatively dated the Woman of Peiting to the Middle Ages. After examining photographs and drawings of the woman's boots, Günter Gall of the German Leather Museum in Offenbach am Main gave a more specific timeframe of 8th or 9th century CE.

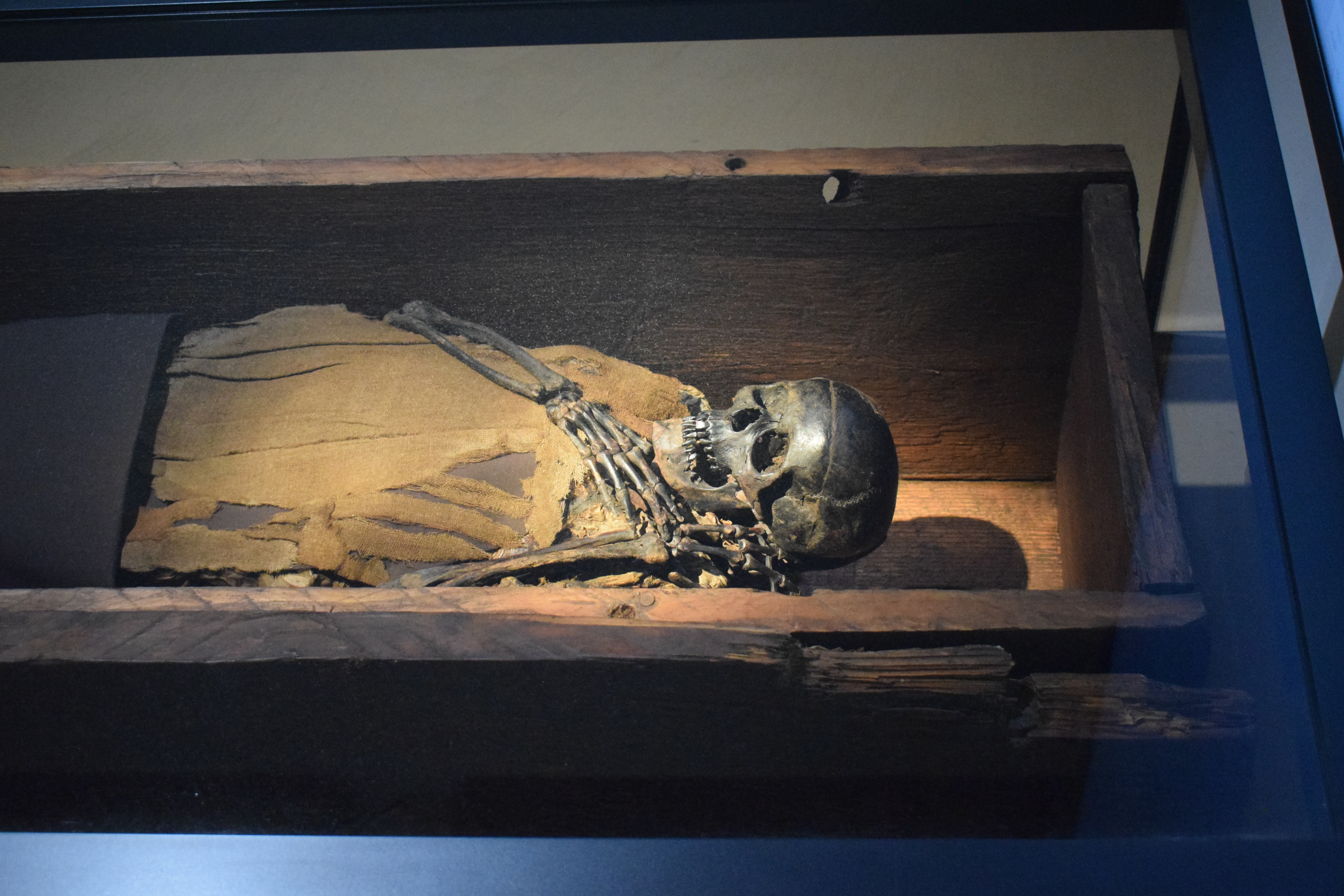
Upper body of the Woman of Peiting. Direct radiocarbon dating in 2007 placed her death in the late Middle Ages, substantially later than an earlier date based on her boots.

In 1965, researchers from the University of Cologne used radiocarbon dating to examine a fragment of wood from the coffin lid. This produced an age of 1110 ± 80 radiocarbon years BP. Later, during the 2007 reassessment, the result corresponded to a calendar range of 1087–1247 CE.

Researchers also attempted to date the coffin using dendrochronology, a method that matches the pattern of a wood sample's tree rings to patterns from the same region whose dates are already known. A reliable comparison requires at least 50 annual growth rings, but the boards used to construct the coffin contained only 30–35. Ultimately, dendrochronology was not able to produce a useful date.

Researchers also tested a sample of the woman's preserved tissue. In October 2007, accelerator mass spectrometry (AMS) was used by researchers at Friedrich-Alexander University Erlangen-Nürnberg. This gave a radiocarbon age of 552 ± 44 years before present. This enabled researchers to say with a 95.4 percent chance that she died in one of two periods: 1290–1370 CE or 1380–1440 CE. Both fall in the Late Middle Ages.

=== Body and health ===
By examining cranial sutures, researchers estimated the Woman of Peiting to be between 15–25 years when she died, which was supported by examining her teeth which indicated an age of no more than 25. Investigating the closure of the growth plates in her bones, she was estimated to be somewhere between 20 and 30. Considering all the evidence, researchers placed her at between 20 and 30 when she died.

The Woman of Peiting was 146 cm (4 ft 9 in) in her preserved state. However, because her legs are bent and her skull had become separated from her spine, this measurement cannot accurately reflect her height in life. In 1957, she was estimated to be taller during her lifetime at about 152 cm (5 ft 0 in). She was identified as female based on preserved external genitalia and skelatel characteristics.

As found, her skeleton was nearly complete. There was no evidence of fractures or other skeletal injuries during her lifetime and there was little wear or degeneration on the joint surfaces. Researchers interpreted this to mean she had not performed heavy physical labour. No Harris lines, markers associated with interruptions in bone growth, were identified. This was interpreted to mean she had not experienced severe illness or malnutrition while growing.

When found, substantial fatty tissue survived around the abdomen, hips and thighs. Along with expanded skin in these areas, researchers concluded she had been well nourished during life.

The 1957 autopsy found all of her internal organs to be complete and well preserved with no signs of major pathological changes. The original researchers saw evidence of a healed inflammation of the large intestine, mild tuberculosis, and soot deposits in the alveoli of the lungs. However, these findings cannot be verified because the organ specimens have been lost.

The Woman of Peiting had an overbite of approximately 2 to 3 cm (0.79 to 1.18 in). During her liftetime, she lost three teeth and their empty tooth sockets had healed. Four other teeth were severely affected by dental caries. Researchers reported an unusually broad lower jaw, but suggested it may be the effect of time in the bog and not a physical characteristic. They could not examine the surface of her teeth for dental wear because the acidic bog environment had destroyed much of the tooth enamel, however the surviving dentin showed no unusual wear.

When she was found, her hair had been combed back and held in place by a hairband. It was about measured to be about 15 cm (5.9 in) in length.

=== Pregnancy ===
Initially, researchers believed the Woman of Peiting had recently been pregnant. This was based on an unusually distended abdomen, a protruding vulva, widening of the pelvic ring and the condition of her uterus. Some concluded her death was related to childbirth or the postpartum period.

During a reexamination in 2009, German archaeologist Brigitte Haas-Gebhard and forensic pathologist Klaus Püschel concluded that earlier observations did not establish that she had recently given birth. Decomposition made it difficult to interpret some of the changes in her body, which meant pregnancy could not be confirmed.

Researchers measured different forms of carbon and nitrogen in the amino acids that make up her hair. As hair grows, it can record changes in how the body processes nutrients. metabolism can be determined by studying these elements. They found a slight rise after the point when they thought she might have become pregnant, which then fell in the last months of her life. They suggested after what they regarded as a suspected conception, followed by a decline in amino-acid-specific nitrogen isotope values during the final months of her life. Researchers suggested pregnancy could explain this pattern.

=== Last meal ===
By examining the body's digestive tract, researchers in the 1950s estimated her last meal was about six to eight hours before her death. Samples of from her stomach and intestines, including preserved fecal material, were examined in Wilhelmshaven and Hamburg. They found mainly plant remains, including vegetables, salad plants and cereal husks, as well a small amount of animal-based fibre.

By 1960, only three years after her discovery, samples of the woman's original intestinal contents were already missing and are now considered lost.

=== Geographical origin ===
In 2010, anthropologist Guinevere Granite and archaeologist Andreas Bauerochse examined her bones and teeth using portable X-ray fluorescence spectroscopy (pXRF) to measure concentrations of chemical elements. No soil samples were available from the location where she was found, so they compared the remains with existing geochemical soil data from locations 5, 10 and 15 km (3.1, 6.2 and 9.3 mi) from the estimated discovery site.

By comparing strontium in her bones and teeth with those in the regional soil data, researchers learned that concentrations in the bones and teeth were broadly similar to one another, but still lower than those recorded in the surrounding soils. Granite and Bauerochse suggested this may indicate that the woman had grown up and perhaps died elsewhere before her burial at Peiting.

Researchers recommended caution in making conclusions based on their results. During centuries in the acidic bog, strontium could have been either added or removed from her body by the peat. The coffin may also have restricted the exchange of strontium between the body and the surrounding area. Ultimately, Granite and Bauerochse concluded that strontium concentrations measured by pXRF could not reliably be used to reconstruct the Woman of Peiting's origins or migration history.

Later research also investigated her geographical origin using isotope analysis of her hair. This did not yield usable results.

== Cause of death ==
Forensic examinations found no evidence that could reliably establish how she died. Loss of skin and muscle tissue from the neck makes it difficult to determine whether she died by strangulation. Researchers Haas-Gebhard and Püschel suggested that poisoning or a rapidly progressing disease or infection may have occurred but were not detected during the earlier autopsy.

== Exhibition and ownership ==
After the completion of the initial scientific investigations and conservation work, the woman's remains were kept and exhibited at the Textile Museum in Neumünster for several decades.

In 1987, Peiting requested that the woman's remains be returned for the municipality's 550th-anniversary celebrations the following year, with the intention of displaying her in a museum in Schongau. A dispute over possession was resolved when the municipality and the Neumünster museum agreed that the remains would return to Bavaria on loan for the 1988 anniversary exhibition.

In early 2007, the Woman of Peiting was loaned to the LWL Museum of Archaeology in Herne, North Rhine-Westphalia. The original remains went on display there on 23 February as part of the exhibition klima und mensch. leben in eXtremen and remained until the exhibition closed on 30 May. The museum announced at the time that the remains would subsequently travel to Bavaria for further testing and examination.

The remains were later transferred to the Free State of Bavaria, which assumed responsibility for her continued preservation and scientific investigation. They were subsequently sent to the Bavarian State Office for Monument Protection for the reassessment that established much of the modern understanding of the find.

The woman's remains are now held by the Archäologische Staatssammlung in Munich. Following the museum's renovation and reopening in 2024, the Woman of Peiting was incorporated into a permanent exhibition.

She is no longer on display and a replica of her body and coffin are exhibited at the Bavarian Moor and Peat Museum in Rottau.

== See also ==
- List of bog bodies from Germany
