= Dannike Woman =

17th century bog body from Sweden

- Died: 1690–1700
- Body discovered: Rydetsmossen, Dannike, Sweden
- Resting place: Borås Museum, Borås, Sweden
- Other name: Häxan från Dannike (Witch from Dannike)
- Era: 17th century

The Dannike Woman (Swedish: Dannikekvinnan), also known as the witch from Dannike (Häxan från Dannike) and the mysterious woman from Dannike (Den gåtfulla kvinnan från Dannike), was a woman who lived in the 17th century, whose body was found in a raised bog in western Sweden in 1942. The woman's identity is unknown, and there is a lack of common consensus on the likely circumstances of her life and death. Alongside the Bocksten Man and the Luttra Woman, the Dannike Woman has been described as one of Sweden's most famous bog bodies. Her remains and belongings are on permanent display at Borås Museum, near where she was found.

== Discovery ==
The woman now known as the Dannike Woman (Swedish: Dannikekvinnan) was found during the summer of 1942 in Rydetsmossen, a raised bog in Dannike, Borås Municipality, Västra Götaland County. Two peat cutters working in the bog uncovered a simple, lidless birch coffin around 45 centimetres below the surface. Inside were the woman's remains, along with remnants of her clothing and other personal belongings.

The discovery was reported to a local police official, who contacted the Swedish National Heritage Board. The following day, antiquarian Erik Floderus arrived at Rydetsmossen to examine the woman and her burial.

Floderus then took the Dannike Woman's remains, clothing and other belongings to Stockholm for further examination and conservation. In 1944, he published the results of his study.

== Condition ==
The Dannike Woman's remains were incomplete when they were found. Most of her skull and parts of her head were missing, as were portions of her spine and legs. Some of her hair and nails survived, along with fragments of her clothing.

Despite the missing parts, enough of her remains survived to show how she had been buried. She lay on her left side with her knees slightly drawn towards her body. Her hands had been bound, and her feet may also have been bound.

== Clothing and associated items ==
Fragments of several items of clothing survived with the Dannike Woman. Later examination of the textiles indicated that one garment may have been a long, lined wool coat or jacket. Fragments interpreted as knitted wool stockings were also preserved. A pair of shoes was also recovered. They were made from leather and birch bark, and the sole of the right shoe contained an insert.

Five Swedish coins were found among the objects associated with the burial. These included a silver one-öre coin bearing Charles XI, king of Sweden from 1660 to 1697, and three copper one-sixth-öre coins of Charles XI, minted in 1672, 1676 and 1677. A pierced silver one-öre coin bore John III, king of Sweden from 1569 to 1592. Its mint date could not be established, and it was interpreted as having been worn as a pendant.

Other small objects included two beads, two pieces of quartz, a corroded knife, three buttons and two pieces of flint. A brass tobacco box and a clay tobacco pipe were also found with her.

Leather fragments found with the burial have been interpreted as the remains of a pouch, although their condition makes their original form uncertain. It is also uncertain whether all of the smaller objects were originally contained within it.

== Scientific analysis ==
=== Osteological findings ===
The Dannike underwent initial osteological studies under Floderus at the Swedish National Heritage Board during the 1940s. In the early 2000s, the body was reexamined again, this time by experts from the Västra Götaland Museum and the Swedish History Museum. Neither larger- nor smaller-scale studies of the Dannike Woman has led to there being a common consensus about her life, death, or how she came to be buried in the Rydetsmossen.

Osteological studies have identified the Dannike Woman as being around 20 years old at the time of her death, and measuring a height of around 160 centimetres. Her joints were noted to be healthy, with no sign of wear and tear. She had a curvature of her right tibia, which suggested she may have had athetosis, possibly caused by polio.

=== Dating ===
When the Dannike Woman was first discovered in the 1940s, her body was dated to the 1670s based on the most recent öre coin found in her possession, which was minted in 1677. Later testing and research by Åkerhagen that established that her pipe had not been made until 1690, led to it being largely accepted that she unlikely to have died prior to that date.

== Cause of death ==
The cause of the Dannike Woman's death is unknown. When osteologist Maria Vretemark examined her skeleton in 2000, she found no injuries showing that the woman had been executed. However, her skull and the bones of her neck are missing. Injuries to those parts of the body therefore cannot be studied, and it is not possible to rule out hanging.

Her unusual burial in a bog near Dannike, Sweden, has led to several theories about how she died. In 1944, archaeologist Erik Floderus suggested that she had died by suicide. He noted that around 1700, when she is believed to have died, people who died by suicide could be denied burial in a churchyard. Floderus believed that the location of her grave and her simple coffin might be evidence of such a burial. Vretemark later considered suicide a possibility, but the surviving bones do not show how the woman died.

Another theory connected her death with pregnancy. It was based partly on a suggestion that one of her surviving garments had been stretched around the waist. Later examination of the textile found no clear evidence of this stretching. The garment had been wrapped around her body rather than worn when she was buried.

== Theories and interpretations ==
The identity of the Dannike Woman and the reason she was buried in Rydetsmossen are unknown. Since her discovery in 1942, researchers, museum curators and local traditions have offered explanations based on her burial place, clothing, personal belongings and remains.

Local stories described the Dannike Woman as a witch who had been burned at the stake, contributing to her nickname, the "witch from Dannike" (Häxan från Dannike). Swedish antiquarian Erik Floderus, who examined the remains shortly after their discovery in 1942, found that her surviving hair, clothing, nails and shoes showed no signs of burning.

Another local story concerned her missing skull. Later accounts claimed that a peat cutter removed and hid it because of a belief that this would prevent the woman from haunting the nearby village of Dannike. Most of the skull was already missing when Floderus arrived at Rydetsmossen in 1942, and its fate is unknown.

Her social position is also uncertain. Her relatively coarse wool clothing has been interpreted as evidence of modest social standing, while examination of her skeleton found little joint wear associated with heavy physical labour. Borås Museum, which holds and displays her remains, describes her as probably a peasant while presenting several possible interpretations of her background.

The clay tobacco pipe and brass tobacco box found with her have also influenced interpretations. Swedish pipe historian Arne Åkerhagen identified the pipe as a type made no earlier than about 1690, probably in Portsmouth or Southampton in southern England. Because little written or pictorial evidence survives of women smoking in 17th-century Sweden, some researchers have suggested that her tobacco use may have been considered socially unusual and contributed to her burial outside a churchyard.

Historian Jordan Goodman, who has studied tobacco and its social history, questioned this interpretation. He noted that pipes were the usual means of smoking tobacco at the time and argued that possession of one does not show that a woman would have been excluded from ordinary burial.

== Exhibition and reconstruction ==
Following the completion of Floderus' studies of the Dannike Woman in 1944, she was described as a "strange but not exceptional find" by the Swedish National Heritage Board. Ingegärd Vallin, a curator at the Borås Museum, fought for the body to be returned to Borås, which was eventually agreed.

Upon the Dannike Woman's return to Borås, where she was displayed at various locations within the municipality's museum system until 2001, starting with the entrance to the Nymanska gården, where she was labelled as the "witch from Dannike". After the museum was remodelled from 2001, a temporary exhibition, "The Mysterious Woman from Dannike" (Den gåtfulla kvinnan från Dannike), was put on display at the Ohlsonska gården.

The 2001 updated study of the Dannike Woman noted that she had been incorrectly displayed by the Borås Museum since she had first been put on display sixty years earlier; this included some bones being placed correctly, including her left leg being placed on the right side of her body. This was subsequently corrected by curators. As a result of this study, the Swedish History Museum was able to conserve and recreate a pattern from an item of the Dannike Woman's, which was subsequently reproduced by students at the Swedish School of Textiles and put on display alongside the body.

On 28 May 2026, a permanent exhibition, entitled "The Dannike Woman – Life in the Bog" (Dannikekvinnan – livet tiden mossen), opened at the Borås Museum.

Eva Persson has called for the Dannike Woman to be reburied in consecrated ground. A memorial stone is placed where her body was found in the Rydetsmossen.

== See also ==
- List of Swedish bog bodies
