= Amcotts Moor Woman =

Late Roman bog body found in England

- The surviving leather shoe recovered with the body
- Born: Unknown
- Died: c. AD 200–400; Amcotts, Lincolnshire, England
- Resting place: Remains largely lost; surviving shoe unknown
- Known for: Bog body discovered in 1747; exceptional preservation reported at time of recovery; surviving Romano-British leather shoe

Amcotts Moor Woman is the name given to a bog body discovered in 1747 near Amcotts, Lincolnshire, England. The remains were reported to be remarkably well preserved when examined several months after their discovery, but the body and most of the associated material were subsequently lost. Only one leather shoe survives.

The surviving shoe dates the remains to the Romano-British period, probably between AD 200 and 400. In a 1992 reassessment, archaeologists Richard C. Turner, then Cheshire County Archaeologist, and Michael Rhodes of the Museum of London described the shoe as one of the few surviving artefacts known to have been recovered with a British bog body.

== Discovery ==
The individual now known as Amcotts Moor Woman was discovered in June 1747, about 2.1 metres (7 ft) beneath the peat near Amcotts, Lincolnshire. A substantial amount of peat had already been removed from that part of the moor when peat cutter John Tate struck and severed one of her feet with his spade. The foot was still wearing a leather shoe. Frightened by the discovery, Tate left the body where it lay.

After learning of the discovery, local antiquarian George Stovin of Hurst went to the site with his gardener, Thomas Perfect, and several others. They excavated the rest of her body and found a second leather shoe still on her other foot. Stovin documented the discovery and later described it in a letter to his son.

== Condition ==
Amcotts Moor Woman was found lying on her side in a tightly flexed position, with her head and feet drawn close together. Although much of her flesh had disappeared, large areas of her skin survived and enclosed bones that had become displaced from their original positions. Stovin described her skin as strong and flexible, while her bones had turned black. Hair survived on her head and in the pubic region, leading Stovin to identify her as a woman. Her hands were particularly well preserved, and her fingernails remained firmly attached. Several of her teeth also remained firmly in her jaws.

== Clothing and associated items ==
When Amcotts Moor Woman was discovered no clothing was recorded on her body, but she was wearing two leather shoes, one on each foot. Stovin described them as tawny brown and noted that the leather remained soft and flexible after they were removed from the peat. Bones from the woman's feet were still inside them.

The shoes were each made from a single piece of hide shaped around the foot, with a short seam joining the leather at the heel. Loops cut around the opening were threaded with a leather lace, which gathered the shoe around the foot when tightened and drew the toe upward.

Only the left shoe is known to survive. Nearly 250 years after the discovery, archaeologists R. C. Turner and Michael Rhodes traced it while investigating the original records of the find. By comparing its construction with footwear from Roman archaeological sites, they dated it to about AD 200–400, during the later centuries of Roman rule in Britain. The shoe therefore provides the main evidence for the date of the woman's remains.

== Fate of the remains ==
Following the excavation in 1747, local antiquarian George Stovin removed several parts of Amcotts Moor Woman's body for preservation and examination. He removed the skin from one arm, from the elbow to the hand, and shook out the bones. In his manuscript, he wrote that it "would have made a ladies' muff", referring to a cylindrical covering used to keep the hands warm. He also preserved her other hand by removing its bones and stuffing the skin to retain its shape. The fingernails remained attached, although the hand began to shrink after exposure to the air.

Stovin showed the preserved hand and one of the woman's leather shoes to Thomas Whichcot of Harpswell, Lincolnshire, a Member of Parliament for Lincolnshire. Whichcot tried on the shoe, an incident Stovin recorded with the words "who was pleased to put the sandal on". In September 1747, Stovin sent the hand and shoe to the Royal Society, a scientific institution in London, England, seeking its opinion on the age of the footwear.

The objects were subsequently examined by the Society of Antiquaries of London, an organisation devoted to the study of history and archaeology. The antiquary and engraver George Vertue described the shoe's construction and compared it with historical footwear. The Royal Society returned the objects to Stovin after examination. His son, James Stovin, subsequently held the preserved hand and one of the shoes at Doncaster, Yorkshire, England.

Stovin buried the woman's remaining body in the chapel yard at Amcotts, Lincolnshire. In his manuscript, he recorded, "I burried [sic] the remains of this lady in Amcots chapel yard." The precise location of the burial is unknown.

Most of the remains and associated material were subsequently lost, but the shoe from the woman's left foot survived. In 1992, archaeologists Richard C. Turner and Michael Rhodes reported its rediscovery following an investigation of the original records. They identified it as one of the few surviving artefacts recovered with a British bog body and apparently the earliest excavated shoe subsequently preserved in an antiquarian collection. Its construction also provided the principal evidence for dating the woman to the later Roman period, approximately 200–400 CE.

In 2019, archaeologist Melanie Giles located eighteenth-century watercolour drawings of the woman's hand and shoes in the collections of the Society of Antiquaries of London. Made by Vertue, the drawings include two views of the preserved hand, showing its palm and back. They provide a visual record of a part of her body that no longer survives.

== Cause of death ==
Based on the tightly flexed posture described by Stovin, he concluded that the individual had likely died by sinking upright into the unstable peat. Several later researchers have supported this interpretation, proposing accidental death rather than ritual killing, execution, or interpersonal violence, explanations sometimes offered for other European bog bodies. The limited preservation of the remains means that the precise circumstances of death cannot be determined.

== Significance ==
The Amcotts Moor Woman is one of the earliest recorded bog-body discoveries in Britain and provides evidence for the preservation conditions of the wetlands of the Isle of Axholme prior to their drainage. The surviving leather shoe also contributes to the study of Roman-period footwear and dress on the provincial frontier.

== See also ==
- List of bog bodies from Great Britain
