= Stoneyisland Man =

Neolithic bog body from Ireland

Coordinates: 53°5′2.5″N 8°17′41″W

- Diagram of the preserved skeletal remains. Red indicates lightly fragmented bones; blue indicates heavily fragmented bones.
- Died: c. 3320–3220 BCE; Stoneyisland Bog, Gortanumera, County Galway, Ireland
- Resting place: National Museum of Ireland
- Other name: Stoney Island Bog body
- Era: Neolithic Ireland
- Known for: Neolithic bog body discovered in County Galway, Ireland
- Height: 5 ft 2 in (157 cm)

Stoneyisland Man is the name given to a Neolithic human skeleton discovered in 1929 in Stoneyisland Bog at Gortanumera, County Galway, Ireland. The remains, preserved within deep peat deposits, represent one of the rare examples of a prehistoric bog body from Ireland dating to the fourth millennium BCE.

Osteological examination identified the individual as an adult male about 40 years old and approximately 5 feet 2 inches (157 cm) tall. Because only skeletal remains survive, features such as hair colour, skin condition, and soft-tissue disease cannot be reconstructed. Pollen analysis of peat from the find layer first suggested a Neolithic date, and later radiocarbon analysis placed the remains between 3320 and 3220 BCE.

Stoneyisland Man lived during a period when early farming communities were established across western Ireland, shaping the landscape through agriculture, settlement, and the construction of megalithic monuments. The body was discovered by turf cutters working in the bog and was later examined by Professor T. Shea of University College Galway, who concluded that the individual had likely drowned in what had once been a lake before peat accumulated above the remains.

== Discovery ==
The individual who became known as Stoneyisland Man was discovered in 1929 by turf-cutters James Dolphin, Thomas Rodgers, and John Spain while they were cutting turf on Dolphin's bank, towards the centre of Stoneyisland Bog at Gortanumera, County Galway, Ireland. He lay beneath approximately 10 feet (3.0 m) of uncut peat at the base of the bog, only a few inches above the underlying marl. He was found resting on his back with his arms extended at right angles to his body.

Dolphin recalled that tree stumps and deposits of ash had previously been uncovered at higher levels in the bog. He also reported finding a dugout canoe at a depth of approximately 5 feet (1.5 m) while cutting turf in another part of the bog on an earlier occasion.

Following the discovery, the remains were examined and excavated by the Ordnance Survey section working in the district. Stoneyisland Man was then taken to the Anatomical Museum at University College Galway for examination.

The skeleton was initially believed to be the remains of Mr. Ward of Ballyshrule, a local man who had been missing for some time, but was later recognised as prehistoric.

== Condition ==
Stoneyisland Man was found as a largely complete but fully skeletonised body. Most of the skeleton remained intact when it was recovered, although several bones were fragmented to varying degrees. No soft tissue, hair, clothing, implements, or other associated objects were found with the body.

== Scientific analysis ==
Shortly after the discovery in 1929, Professor T. Shea carried out the first osteological examination of Stoneyisland Man at the Anatomical Museum of University College Galway. From the skeleton, Shea concluded that Stoneyisland Man was an adult male who had died at about 40 years of age and stood approximately 5 feet 2 inches (157 cm) tall.

Shea also examined the form of the skeleton. He noted that the lower jaw, teeth, and several limb bones shared characteristics commonly found in prehistoric skeletons from western Europe. The flattening of certain arm and leg bones was likewise considered characteristic of Neolithic skeletal remains.

Because only the skeleton survived, features such as hair colour, skin condition, and soft-tissue disease could not be assessed.

In 1931, J. M. White analysed pollen preserved in peat collected from the layer in which Stoneyisland Man was found. The pollen assemblage indicated that he had been deposited before the raised bog developed, providing the first scientific evidence that the remains dated to the Neolithic.

Later radiocarbon dating confirmed this conclusion, placing Stoneyisland Man between 3320 and 3220 BCE.

In 2015, stable isotope analysis was used to investigate Stoneyisland Man's diet and mobility. The results indicated that he consumed a predominantly terrestrial diet, although his unusually high nitrogen-isotope values may indicate that freshwater fish also formed part of his diet. His strontium isotope values also differed from those of the local geology, suggesting either that he spent his childhood elsewhere or that he had experienced a highly mobile lifestyle.

== Life and background ==
During the later Neolithic period, the region around the middle River Shannon and Lough Derg formed part of a landscape of mixed woodland, wetlands, and small clearings created by early farming communities. By the fourth millennium BCE, people in western Ireland had established farming communities based on cereal cultivation and stock-keeping, while hunting, fishing, and gathering continued to supplement daily subsistence.

Neolithic communities in western Ireland also formed part of a wider cultural tradition marked by the construction of megalithic monuments, including passage tombs, court tombs, and portal tombs. County Galway and neighbouring regions preserve numerous examples of these monuments, indicating that the area was inhabited by settled or semi-settled communities that shaped the landscape through agriculture, movement, burial, and ritual activity.

Wetlands such as those that later formed Irish raised bogs were an important part of Neolithic landscapes, providing access to water, wild plant resources, timber, and routeways through the wider environment. Stoneyisland Man is unusual in an Irish context because he belongs to the Neolithic rather than the Iron Age, placing him much earlier than the better-known Irish bog bodies.

Archaeological evidence from the wider Shannon basin, including Neolithic monuments and settlement traces, shows that established farming communities occupied the region during the period in which Stoneyisland Man lived. His remains belong to that early farming world in western Ireland.

== Cause of death ==
Professor Shea concluded that "the body [sic] had not sunk slowly down from an originally higher level in the bog, but was lying in the position and at the level where it originally lay". He suggested that the outstretched arms indicated that the person had drowned, sinking to the bottom of what was then a lake before peat accumulated above the body.

== See also ==
- List of bog bodies from Ireland

== Books ==
- Conwell, John Joe (1998). Lickmolassy by the Shannon: A History of Gortanumera and Surrounding Parishes. John Joe Conwell. pp. 3–5. ISBN 0-9534776-0-6.
