= Dannike =

- Location within Västra Götaland Location within Sweden
- Coordinates: 57°41′N 13°13′E
- Country: Sweden
- Province: Västergötland
- County: Västra Götaland County
- Municipality: Borås Municipality

Area
  - Total: 0.41 km^{2} (0.16 sq mi)

Population (31 December 2010)
  - Total: 369
  - Density: 910/km^{2} (2,400/sq mi)
- Time zone: UTC+1 (CET)
  - Summer (DST): UTC+2 (CEST)

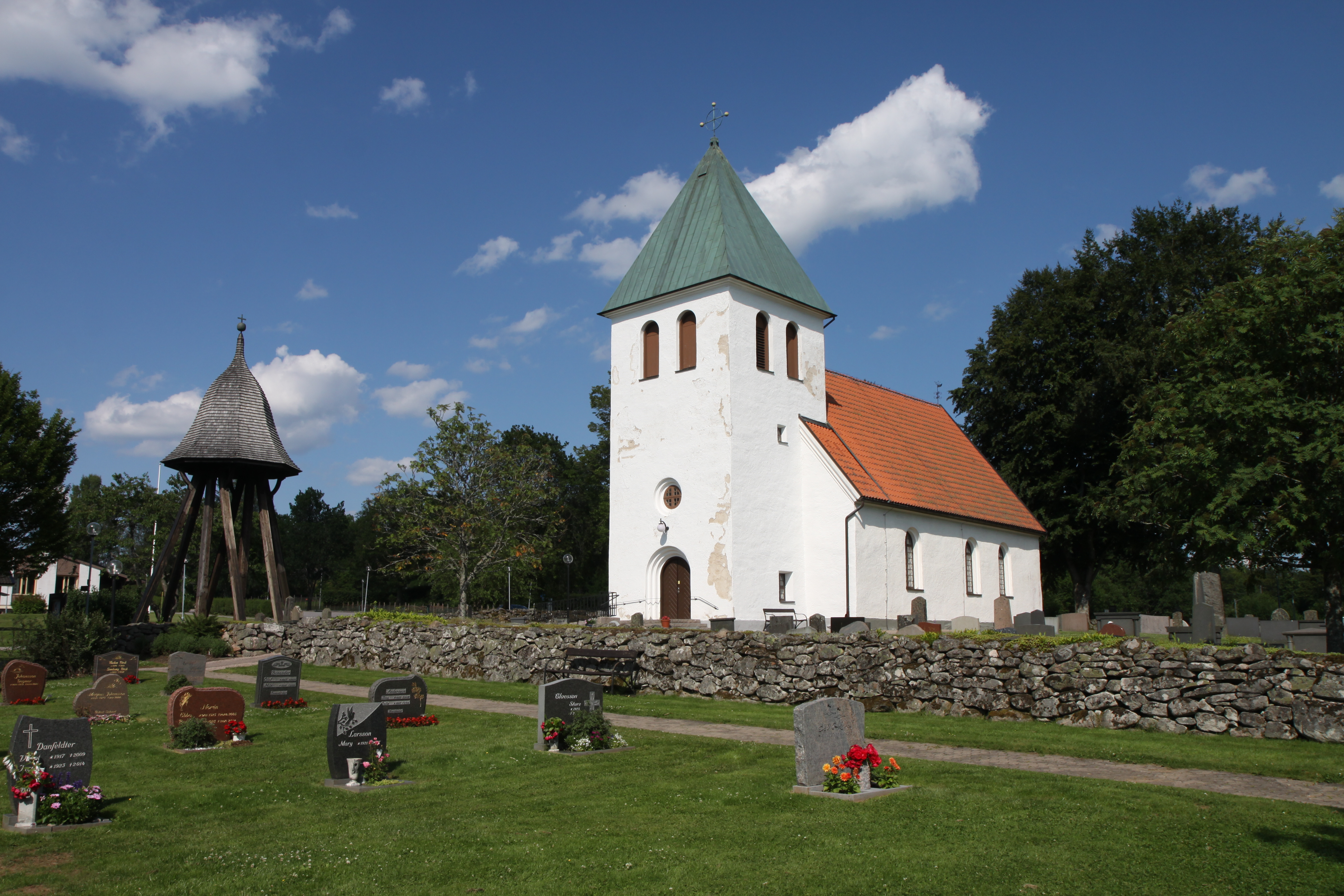
Church

Dannike (Swedish pronunciation: [ˈdânːɪkɛ]) is a locality situated in Borås Municipality, Västra Götaland County, Sweden. It had 369 inhabitants in 2010.

In 1942, a bog body of a 17th century woman was found in the locality. She was later named the Dannike Woman.
