= Windeby I =

Bog body found in Germany

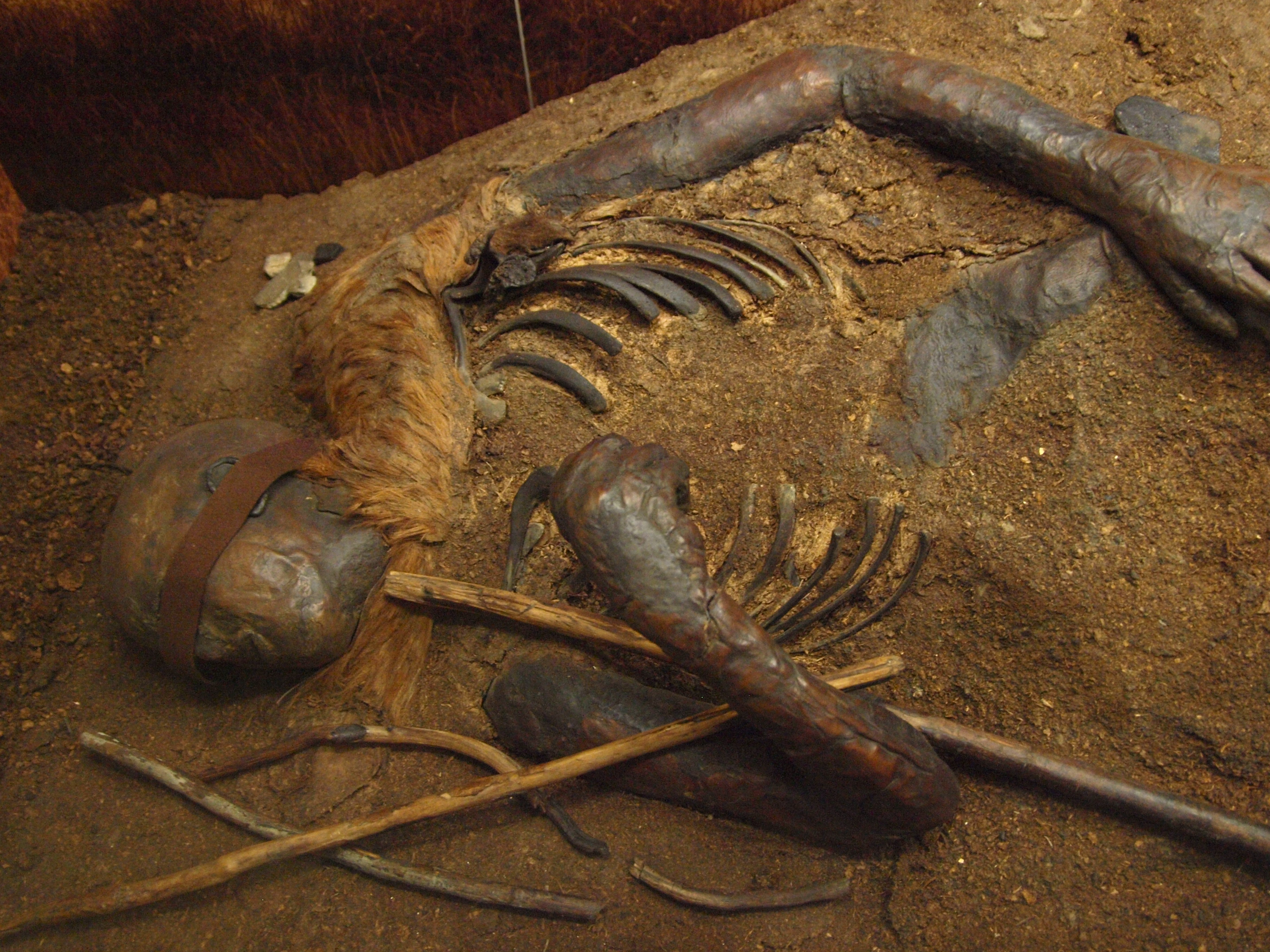
- Upper body of Windeby I
- Born: c. 1st century CE; Region of present-day Schleswig-Holstein, Germany
- Died: c. 1st century CE; Domsland Moor, Windeby, Schleswig-Holstein, Germany
- Resting place: Schloss Gottorf, Schleswig-Holstein State Museum
- Known for: Well preserved Iron Age bog body

Windeby I is a well preserved bog body recovered in 1952 from the Domsland Moor, close to the village of Windeby near Eckernförde in northern Schleswig-Holstein. Scientific work on the remains shows that the body belonged to a male roughly 13 to 14 years old.

For many decades after the discovery, the body was widely described as the Girl of Windeby. Early attempts to determine sex relied on limited methods, and the objects found alongside were misunderstood, leading researchers to misgender the body. Later study overturned this interpretation and identified the remains as those of an adolescent male from the first century CE.

Windeby I is now one of the most familiar archaeological finds of its kind in Germany. Alongside other bog bodies, it is displayed in the permanent exhibition at Schloss Gottorf, where museum presentations explain how the acidic, oxygen-poor peat preserved skin, hair, and textiles in detail.

== Discovery ==
The body now known as Windeby I was found on 19 May 1952, when commercial peat cutters were working in the Domsland Moor on the Windeby estate near Schleswig in northern Schleswig-Holstein. One of the workers noticed what looked like a human femur in a freshly cut block of peat, and the team stopped work and shut down the machinery so they could investigate the find.

Workers searched for additional pieces and then informed the archaeological museum in Schleswig. Museum staff documented the find, removed the body in a single block of peat, and transferred it to the Schleswig-Holstein State Museum at Schloss Gottorf for careful excavation and conservation.

A second bog body, later named Windeby II, was found about 4.6 to 4.9 m (15 to 16 ft) away. This individual, an adult male, had been strangled with a hazel branch and pinned down with wooden stakes.

== Burial and associated items ==
Windeby I lay on the right side with the head facing west. The right arm was drawn towards the face, the left arm extended towards the hip, and the legs were slightly bent. A layer of heather lay beneath the body. Layers of cotton grass were recorded above it during excavation. A fur garment remained around the shoulders and upper body when the surrounding peat was excavated. Textile fragments and pieces of a ceramic vessel were also recovered nearby. A narrow sprang-woven wool band lay across the face.

== Condition ==
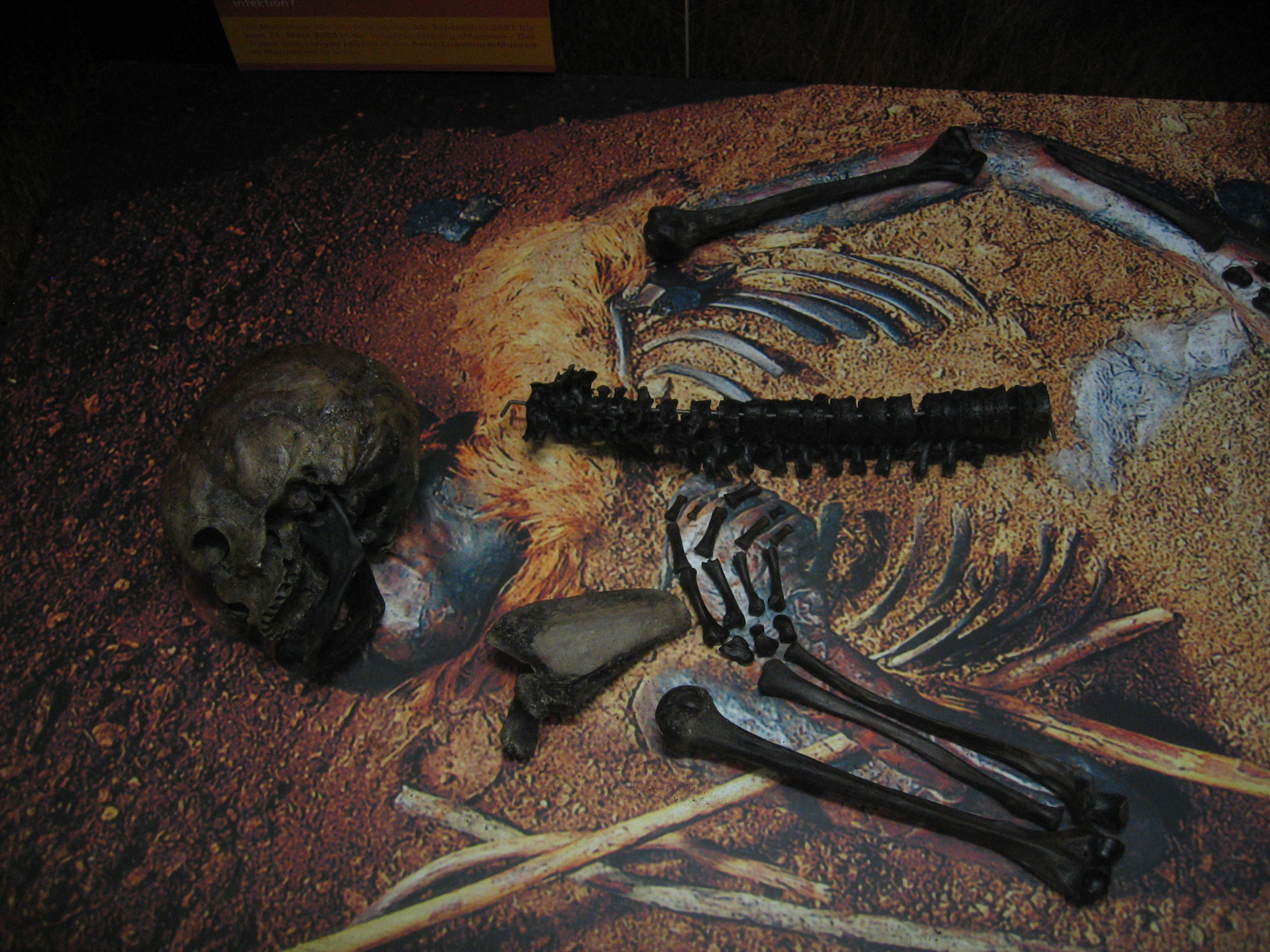
Bones of Windeby I temporarily on display at Archäologisches Landesmuseum

By the time the body was recognized, the peat-cutting machinery had already removed a hand, a foot, and part of a leg, damage that is still visible on the bog body today. The head and hands were the best preserved, and the hair, originally light blond, had been stained reddish by bog acids. The facial tissues were so well preserved that when the skull was opened during conservation, even the folds of the brain were still visible.

The torso was in poorer condition. The chest and abdomen had collapsed, leaving ribs exposed where the skin and soft tissue had decayed. No internal organs survived. The right arm was drawn toward the face, the left angled toward the hip, and the legs were slightly flexed. Despite the damage, the posture indicated that the body had not been violently disturbed after death.

== Early interpretations ==
Following its discovery in 1952, Windeby I was identified as a female adolescent and became widely known as the "Girl of Windeby". This interpretation was based on several observations made during the initial examination. The wool band was interpreted as a blindfold. The hair appeared closely cropped on one side of the head, while the fur garment and fragments of a ceramic vessel found with the body were regarded as consistent with a female burial.

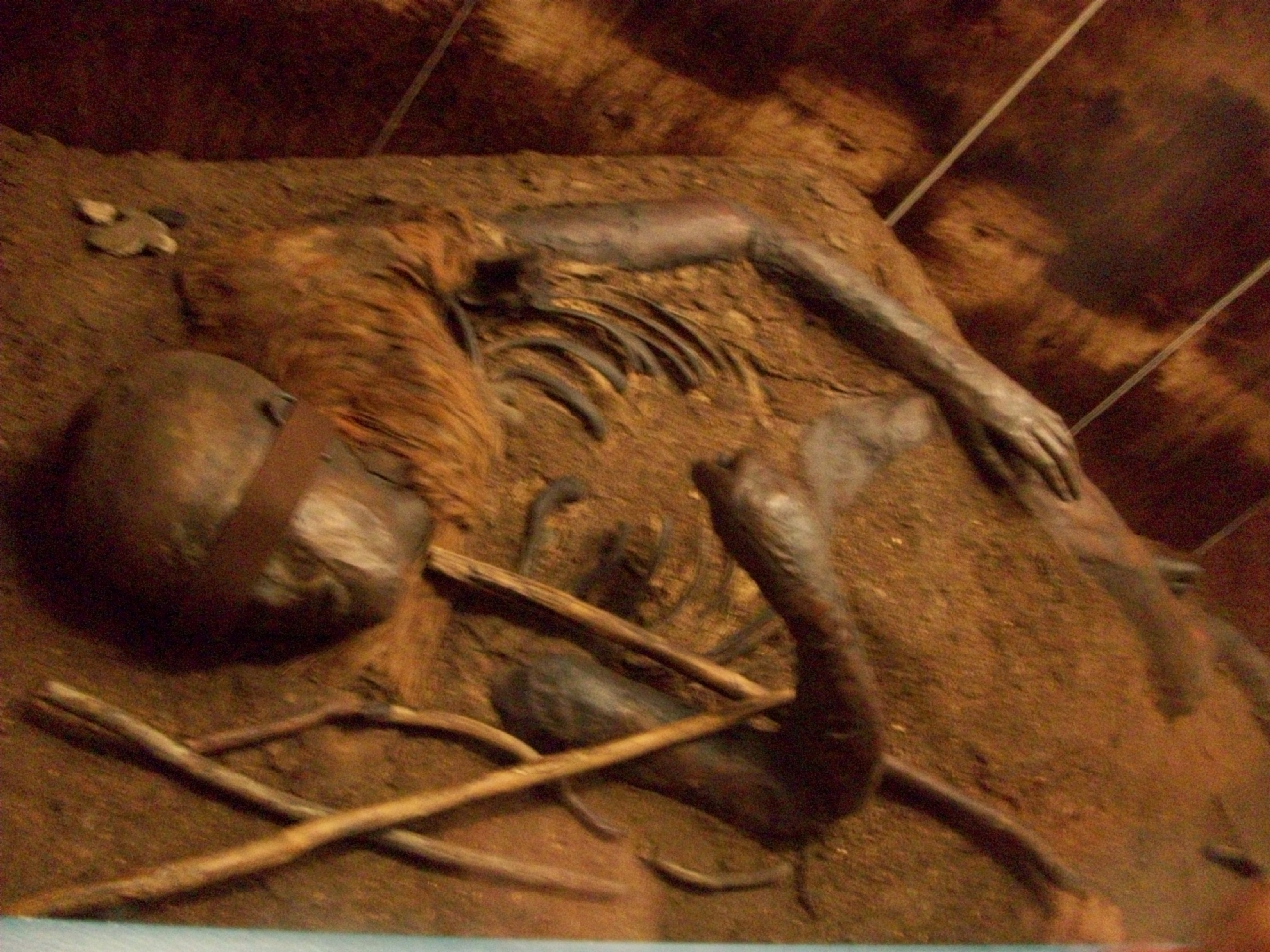
The wool band across Windeby I's face, initially interpreted as a blindfold; later research concluded that it had originally been worn around the head and shifted after burial

The discovery of Windeby II only a few metres away led some researchers to interpret the two bog bodies together. Influenced by the writings of the Roman historian Tacitus, who described punishments and ritual killings among the Germanic peoples, some archaeologists proposed that the pair represented an adulterous couple who had been executed and placed in the bog. This interpretation was widely repeated in museum displays, books, and popular accounts of the discovery.

Beginning in the 1970s, archaeologists re-examined the original excavation records and associated finds. They concluded that the wool band had originally been worn around the head and had slipped over the face as the body changed shape in the peat, rather than serving as a blindfold as originally believed. They also determined that the apparently shaved side of the head resulted from decay and excavation damage rather than deliberate cutting.

== Scientific analysis ==
In the early 2000s, physical anthropologist Heather Gill-Robinson carried out a comprehensive reassessment of Windeby I using skeletal examination, X-rays, CT scans, the original excavation records, and ancient DNA analysis. She concluded that Windeby I was an adolescent male about 13 or 14 years old rather than a female. Gill-Robinson noted that DNA recovered from ancient remains can become contaminated and should be interpreted alongside anatomical evidence. Radiocarbon dating indicates that Windeby I died between 41 BCE and 118 CE.

The reassessment also showed that conservation work carried out during the 1950s had limited later study. Parts of Windeby I's skull had been glued together after excavation, preventing some of the natural joints from being examined to estimate the individual's age.

X-rays revealed numerous Harris lines, indicating repeated interruptions to growth during childhood that were consistent with episodes of illness or poor nutrition. Chemical analysis suggested that Windeby I's diet contained little meat and almost no marine foods, such as fish or shellfish, during the final years of life. Examination of the hair also found surprisingly few head lice, although researchers cautioned that this may have resulted from conditions in the bog rather than the individual's health during life.

== Facial reconstruction ==
Stages in Richard Helmer's 1983 facial reconstruction of Windeby I, from the preserved skull through modelling of the facial tissues to the completed face

Nearly three decades after the body's discovery, German forensic anthropologist Richard Helmer created a forensic facial reconstruction of Windeby I in 1983. Using the preserved skull as a guide, he estimated the thickness of the missing soft tissue to build a model of what the individual's face may have looked like. Helmer published the reconstruction that year in the archaeological journal Offa.

At the time of Helmer's reconstruction, Windeby I was still widely known as the "Girl of Windeby". More than two decades later, the scientific reassessment of the remains identified the individual as an adolescent male.

== Cause of death ==
Interdisciplinary examination of the remains has produced no clear evidence for a violent death. The preserved soft tissues, including the neck region, do not show marks that would indicate strangulation, cutting, or binding, and none of the surviving bones preserve signs of trauma inflicted before death. Instead, clinical and anthropological assessment suggests that the boy suffered from a severe infection of the jaw. The inflammation would likely have caused significant pain, swelling, and systemic stress, and is regarded as the most probable cause of death.

== See also ==
- List of bog bodies from Germany
