= Sprang =

Fabric construction technique

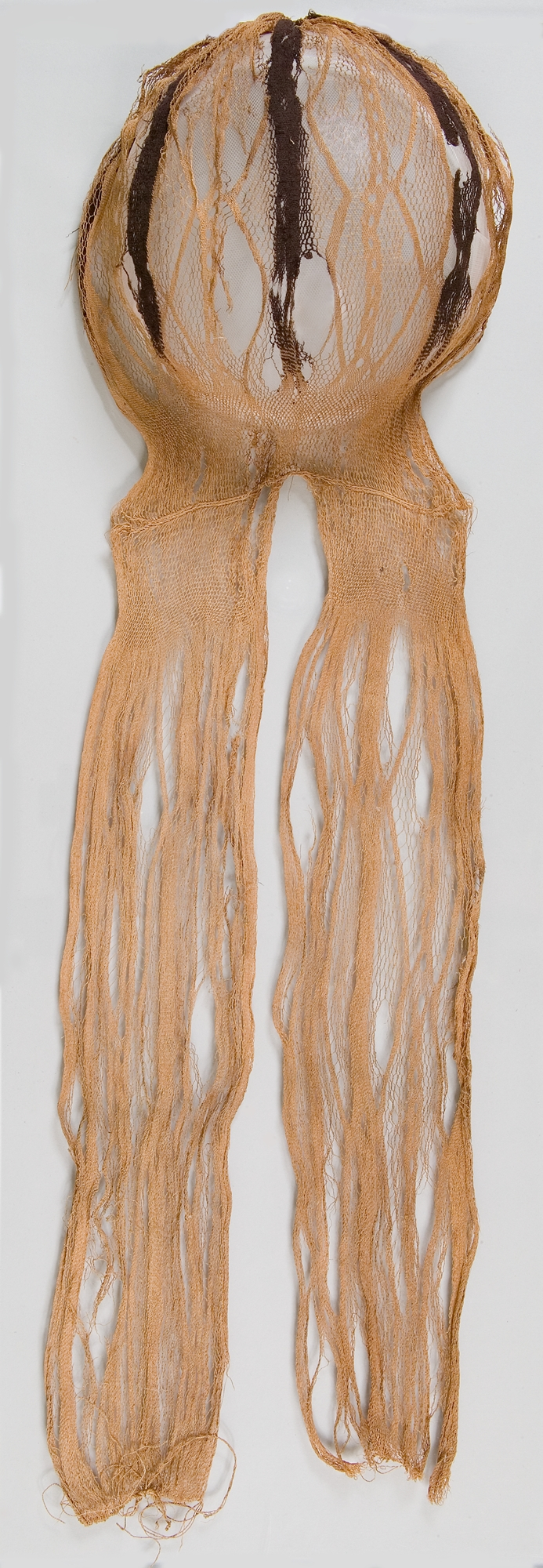
Sprang Headdress from the Head of a Mummy of a Child (MET, 90.5.33)

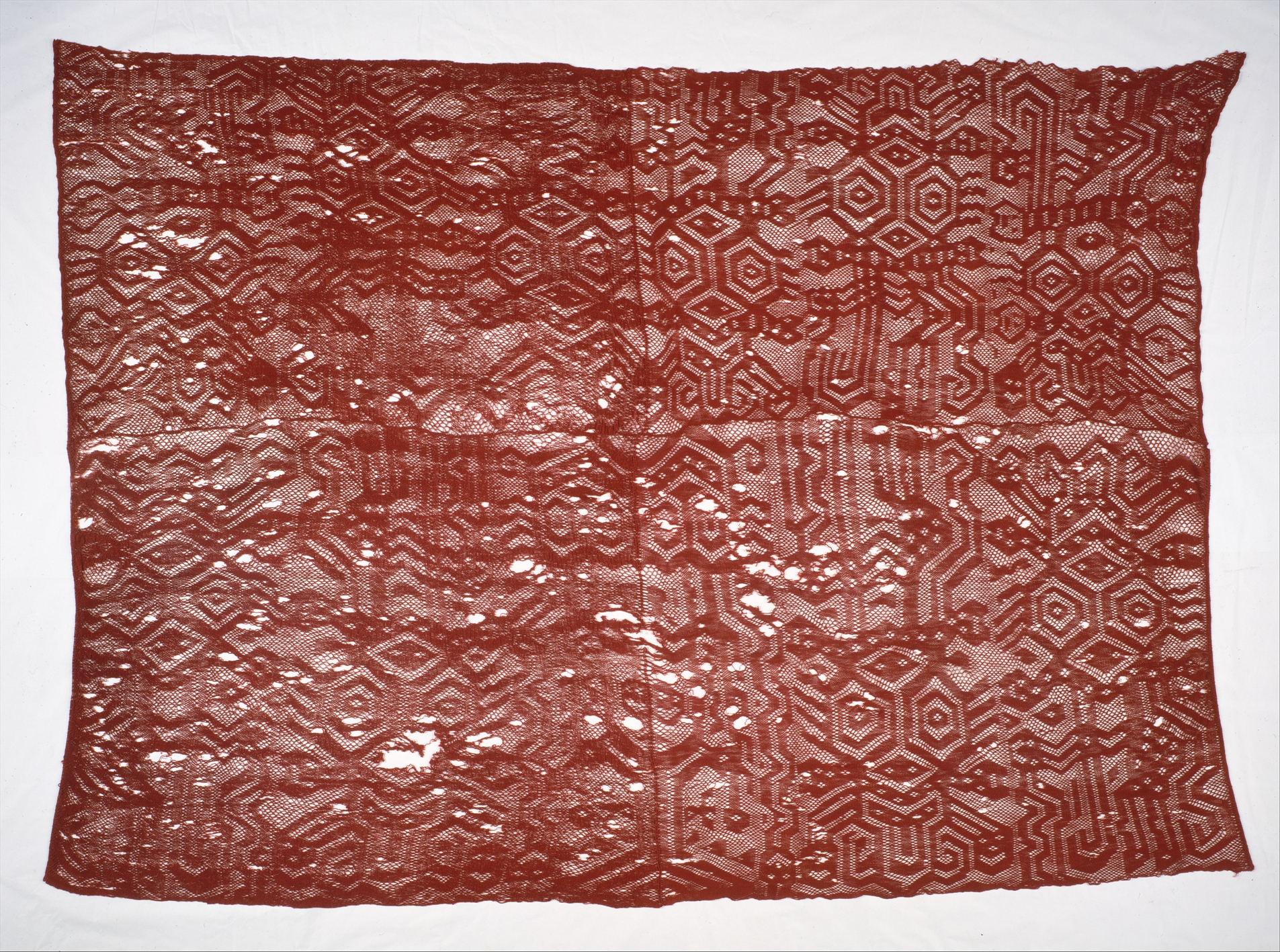
Mantle, Peru, Ocucaje (MET, 1986.488.1)

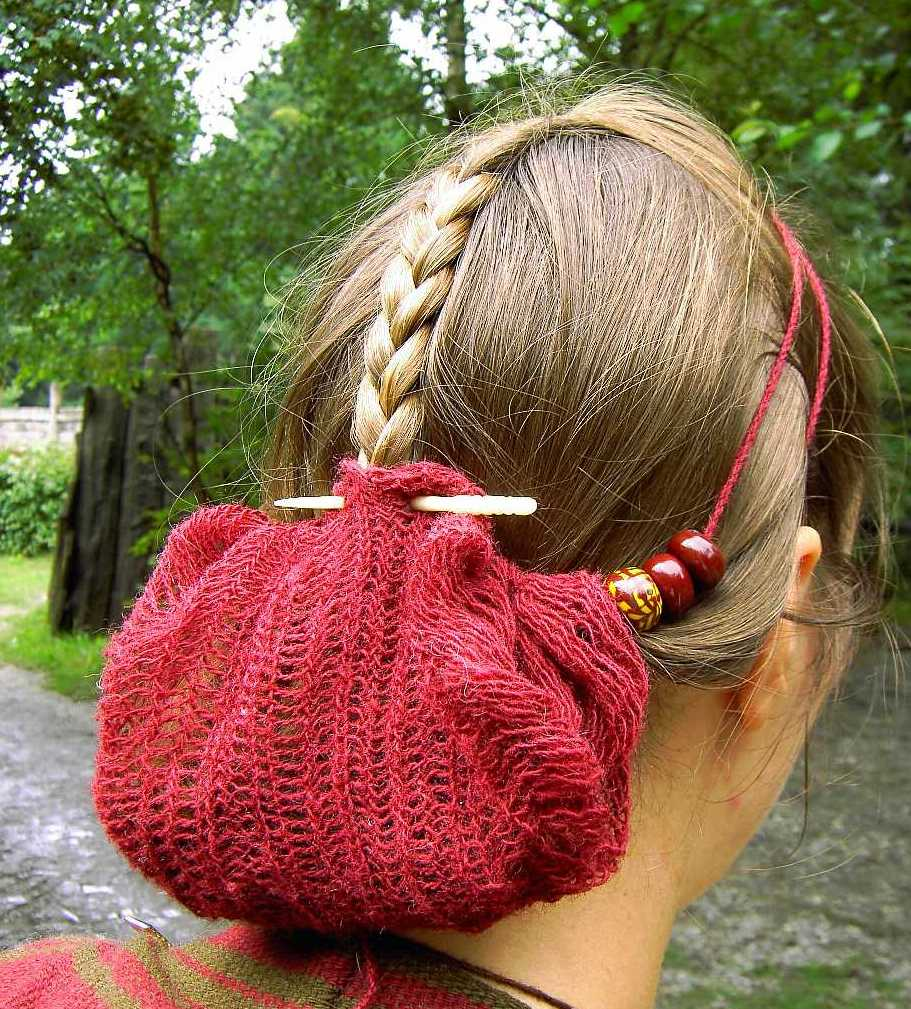
Reconstruction of a Saxon sprang hairnet

Sprang is an ancient method of constructing fabric that has a natural elasticity. Its appearance is similar to netting, but unlike netting, sprang is constructed entirely from warp threads. Archaeological evidence indicates that sprang predates knitting; the two needlework forms bear a visible resemblance and serve similar functions but require different production techniques.

Although examples of sprang have been unearthed from as early as the Bronze Age, sprang was almost entirely undocumented in written records until the late nineteenth century when archaeological finds generated interest in Europe. Museum examples of sprang had been misidentified as knitting or lace until discoveries of ancient examples prompted reexamination of newer pieces. Subsequently, sprang has been identified in a variety of cultures and traditions across several continents. Its practice as a folk art waned during the twentieth century and sprang traditions have disappeared in most locales. Knitting has largely supplanted sprang.

== Technique ==
In principle, sprang may be regarded as a practical application of the fiber manipulation techniques used in the children's game known as cat's cradle. Sprang is made by preparing a set of warp threads either on a rectangular frame or between a pair of beams. The crafter then generates a fabric by interlinking the warp threads. Unlike most textile production techniques that add new rows at the end of completed rows, sprang works upon the center of a group of fibers and the material grows inward from both ends with symmetrical top and bottom halves. The crafter must maintain control of the center area or the structure unravels: most sprang worked upon has too many fibers to keep in hand, so rods or sticks maintain the appropriate fiber positions. The fiber manipulation itself is done by the crafter's fingers. Decorative patterns may be generated by regular variations in the fiber crossings. As crossings accumulate the crafter beats the material flat with a stick. Work continues with the material growing from both edges toward the middle until the center band becomes too tight to continue work. The completed fabric is either separated into two identical items or permanently secured at the middle to stabilize the contrary twists. In traditions where two halves of sprang are not severed by cutting, this center seam is a telltale sign of sprang manufacture.

== History and uses ==
While the word sprang is of Swedish origin, the technique has been practiced by many cultures around the world. The earliest surviving example of sprang is a hair net, c. 1400 BC, that was recovered from a bog in Denmark. Most archaeological finds of sprang fabric come from the later classical era and the start of the Early Medieval period: locations include Norway (third to fifth centuries AD), Switzerland, Egypt (possibly twenty-second dynasty, also early Coptic), and various Roman sites. Use of sprang has also been conjectured from archaeological recoveries of ancient looms and from depictions in period artwork.

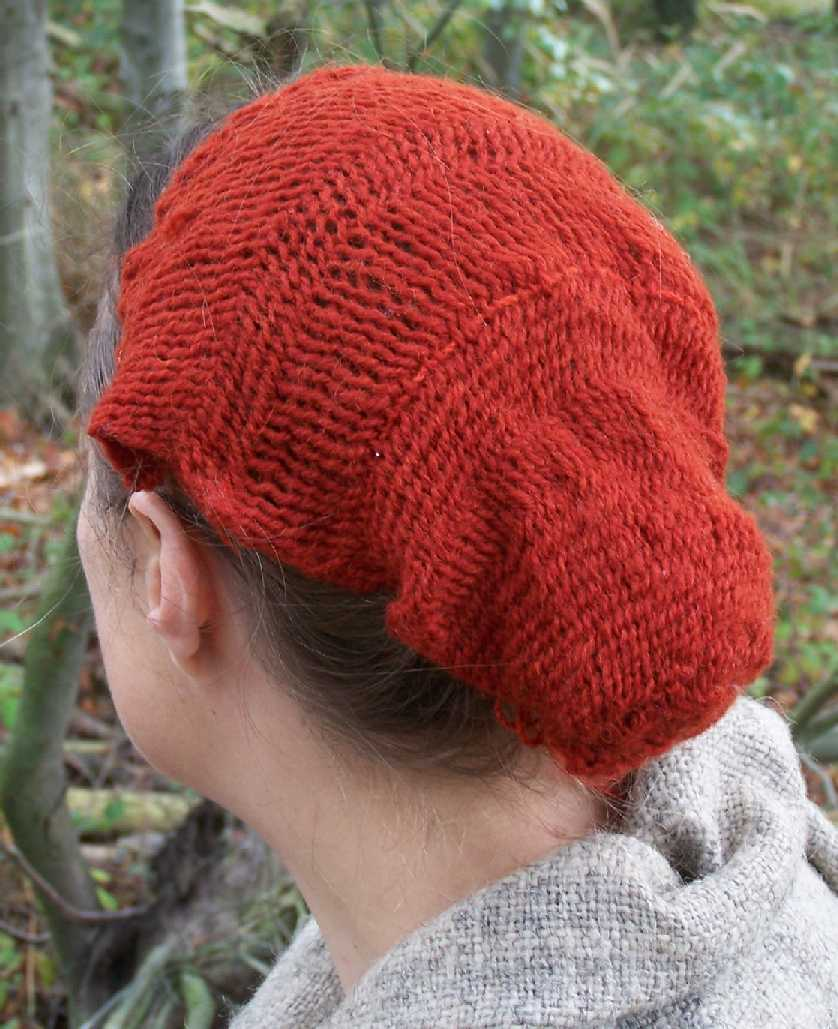
Reconstruction of an Iron Age sprang hairnet from Denmark

Sprang is also an indigenous needlework technique among the peoples of South America, with the earliest known examples dating from before 900 AD among the Paracas culture and Nazca culture in present-day Peru. Recreation of archeological discoveries continue to inform about the presence and range of sprang in the Americas. Sprang has also been noted in the Middle East, Central Asia, the Indian subcontinent, and North America. Indigenous North American sprang includes woolen scarves by the Ho-Chunk of Wisconsin, and Hopi wedding sashes.

The natural elasticity of sprang makes it suitable for stockings, hair nets, sleeves, bags, scarves, and other purposes where pliant material is required. Most sprang needlework is utilitarian and hence was overlooked by scholars until late in its history, according to needlework historian Catherine Amoroso Leslie:

In fact, it was not until the nineteenth century and the discovery of sprang at archaeological sites that it was recognized as a separate and distinct form of needlework. Many museum objects that were wrongly classified as knitting or lace have now been correctly identified as sprang.

Following nearly simultaneous archaeological finds in Denmark and Egypt during the 1870s, an example of Coptic sprang brought to Austria in 1882 inspired the management of a factory near Vienna to manufacture sprang hammocks. The Paris World's Fair of 1889 included an exhibit that duplicated ancient sprang, which led to renewed interest in the technique. Traditionally, cultures that practiced sprang had not produced written records of its manufacture or use. Shortly after the Paris exhibition, living traditions of sprang began to be documented. During the 1890s Ukrainian villagers were identified as practicing sprang in the manufacture of women's caps. Soon afterward, local sprang production for various garments was also documented in parts of Eastern Europe and in Denmark. Local European traditions generally endured until the mid-twentieth century. Sprang is, however, largely a historical technique that has been supplanted for most purposes by the later invention of knitting, whose earliest known example dates from the third century AD.

During the late eighteenth and early nineteenth centuries a military fashion of decorative sprang sashes in silk known as faja in Spain gained international popularity among generals as a distinguishing ornament of rank. The fashion spread to northern Europe and to North America. George Washington wore a sash made of red silk sprang around the year 1779.

== Contemporary sprang ==
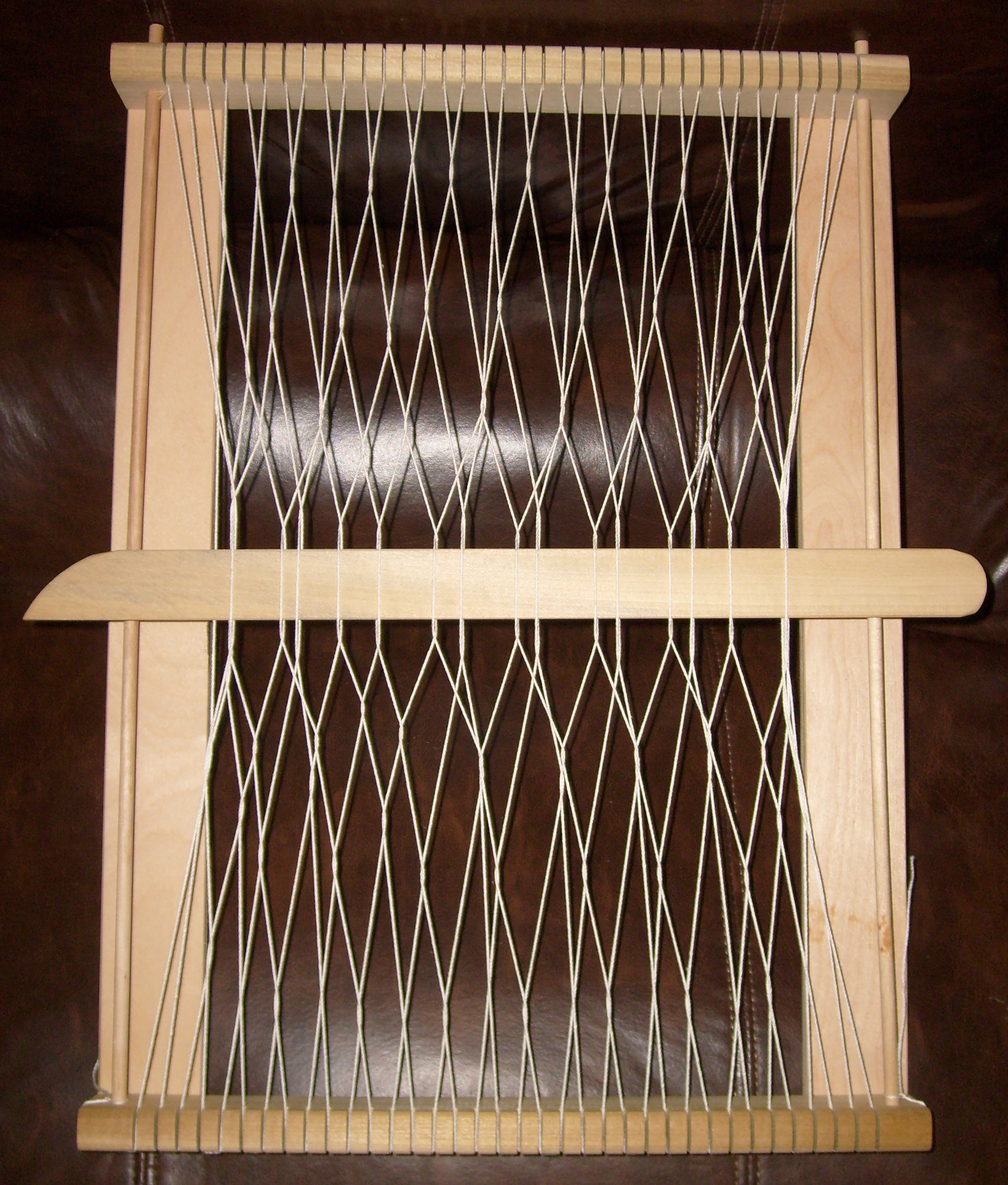
A demonstration of sprang manufacture using a loom

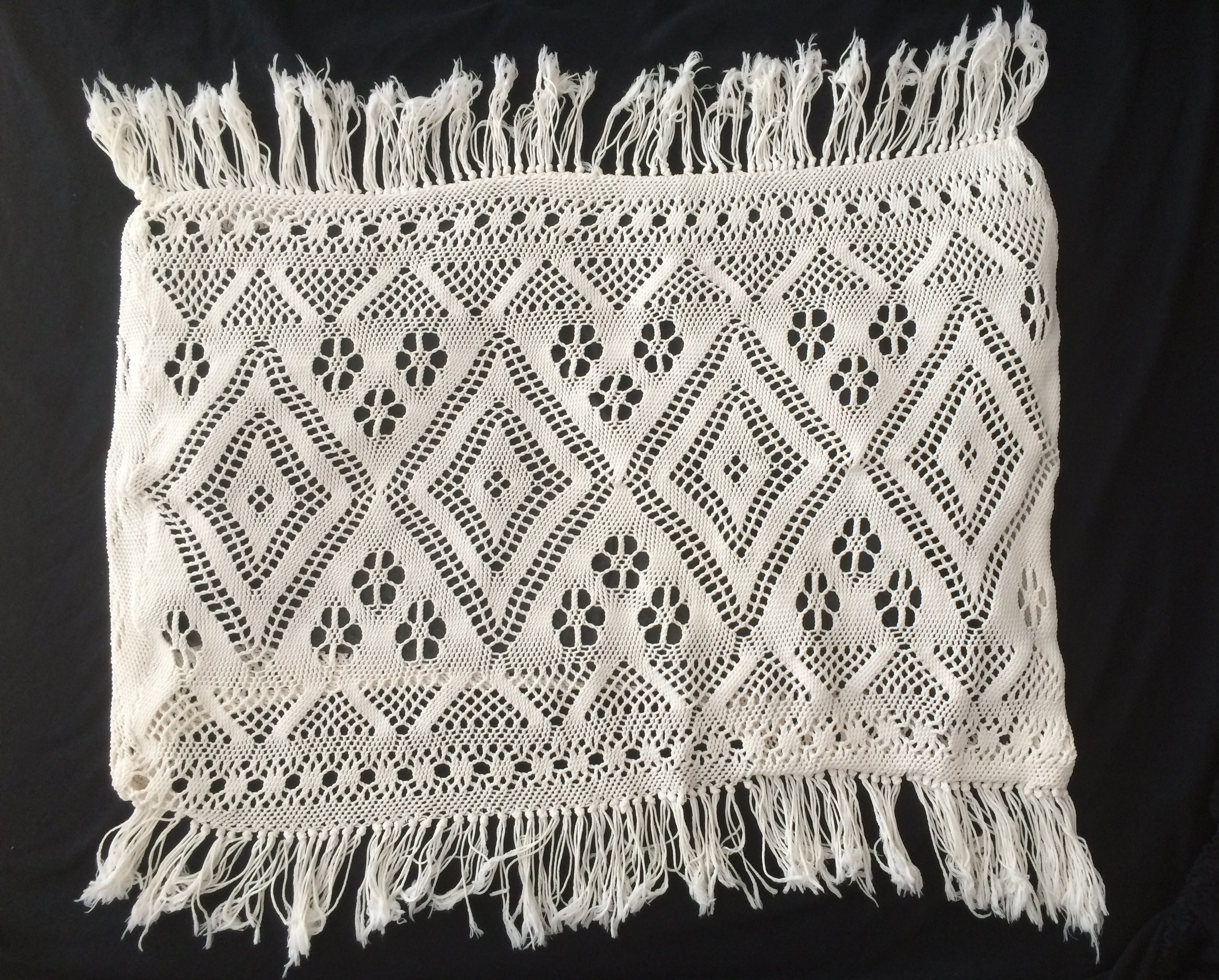
Sprang pillow case, 20th century

In a study of folk textiles of the Peloponnese in Greece, Linda Welters identifies the zonari as a long fringed belt constructed of sprang. The zonari is a rounded material of indeterminate length around 2 or 3 meters long and is wrapped multiple times when worn. From interviews conducted during the 1980s, Welters found that the technique was practiced by elderly women and regarded as a specialized skill which they worked on pairs of beams. Their vocabulary had no special term to correspond with sprang, so they referred to it with descriptive phrases such as knitting with sticks, plaiting, and weaving without passing through. The zonaria are made from sheep's wool hand spun with a spindle and dyed red, blue, or black depending on local custom. Zonaria are a custom in much of Argolida and Corinthia where they are traditional dowry items worn by women from marriage onward and associated with fertility and donned on ritual occasions. Welters observes that these were mostly owned by older women who still wore folk clothing.

The sprang technique also survives as a traditional method for making hammocks in Guatemala, Mexico, and Colombia, and also in Colombia for making a shopping bag known as mechita. The work in these locations is generally performed on a backstrap loom. Handmade Mesoamerican sprang hammocks continue to be produced for export to a variety of international markets.

Additionally, sprang remains in use for making silk trouser drawstrings for male and female attire in Punjab in India and Pakistan. There, village women still use the technique to create colourful check/stipped/zigzag designs that have been handed down the generations. They finish the ends of the work using a weaving technique to make a hard 2-inch 'harar' with bunched twisted threads and knots. These sprang drawstrings are also used for the 'ghugrai' (full long skirts worn traditionally by Punjabi women) – it has been fashionable at times to have the drawstring ends on show, hanging with the 'harar' having colourful pom-poms or jewellery added on. The sprang technique is also used to make the black 'doria' traditionally braided into women's hair; they also have a colourful 'harar' ending fixed at the end. These can be found on sale in Punjab even now. Hairnets, baby cradles, and hanging baskets for fruit were also made. In attempts to retain traditional Punjabi culture, there are cultural craft centres in and around Jullunder where sprang technique is one of several old textile arts being passed on to young craftspeople. Contemporary art textiles sometimes employ sprang in wall hangings.

In the 1970s new texts and research prompted makers to explore the craft. Interest in demonstrating and replicating sprang pieces has led to several books that revive the knowledge and expertise. Peter Collingwood's Techniques of Sprang: Plaiting on Stretched Threads has provided foundational information that has influenced subsequent texts.
