= Dröbnitz Girl =

Bog body found in East Prussia

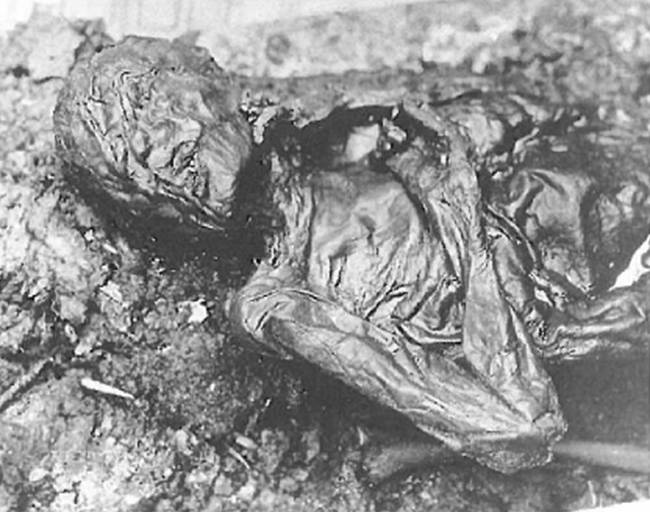
- Face of the Dröbnitz Girl shortly after excavation
- Died: Drwęck, Poland
- Body discovered: 15 July 1939
- Era: c. 500 BCE
- Known for: One of the few bog bodies from Eastern Europe

The Dröbnitz Girl (German: Mädchen von Dröbnitz; Polish: Dziewczynka z Drwęcka) was a naturally preserved cadaver of an adolescent girl found in a peat bog in 1939 in Dröbnitz in East Prussia (present-day Drwęck in Poland). She was one of the few such documented finds of bog bodies in East Prussia and Eastern Europe in general. The archaeological find was lost around the end of World War II.

== Discovery ==
The individual now known as Dröbnitz Girl was discovered on 15 July 1939 in a peat bog at Dröbnitz in East Prussia, near present-day Drwęck in northern Poland. Erich Redmann, a worker with the Reich Labour Service, encountered the remains while working in the bog. Workers first uncovered part of a hide garment and tried to pull it from the peat, accidentally pulling both legs from the body's hip joints.

Four days later, on 19 July, the State Office for Prehistory was notified of the discovery. By then, the body had been moved from where it was found and work in the bog had continued. Archaeologists recovered the remains on 20 July. Most of the legs were missing, although one thigh bone was later recovered during excavation.

Redmann was questioned about how the body had been found, and his account was recorded. The remains were then taken to the Prussia Museum in Königsberg, where they underwent scientific examination and preservation.

== Condition ==
Dröbnitz Girl was well preserved when she was examined shortly after her discovery in July 1939. Apart from the missing parts of her legs, her body remained largely intact. Her skin was still soft and spongy, and her bones, teeth and fingernails had survived. Her internal organs could be clearly identified, and structures within the soft tissue remained visible. In Königsberg, physicians Krause and Zeiger carried out an autopsy of the body.

The body had been found lying on its back, completely wrapped in a fur cloak, with the arms crossed over the chest and the head turned to the right. Because the body had been moved before archaeologists reached the bog, they could no longer determine which direction it had originally faced or record its exact depth and position within the layers of peat.

On 24 July 1939, nine days after the discovery, biologist Groß examined the site and collected peat samples for pollen analysis. About 8 metres (26 feet) from where the body had been found, a 2.6 metres (8 feet 6 inches) column of peat was drilled from the bog. Investigators compared its layers with peat still adhering to the body and estimated that Dröbnitz Girl had originally lain between 1.6 and 2.05 metres (5.2 and 6.7 feet) below the surface, in strongly decomposed sphagnum peat.

== Clothing and associated items ==
The girl was wrapped completely in a sheepskin fur cloak. This was sewn together from four pieces and measured 80 cm high, 150 cm wide. The seams were finished with fine (about 1 to 1.2 mm wide), twisted leather cords by an overcast stitch. The edges were turned over at the neck area. At one corner of the neck area, a leather strap was sewn, and opposite to that, a leather loop serving as a fastener. For a better fit on the shoulders, two darts were sewn onto the shoulder area of the coat. The coat was lengthened at the lower edge by a piece of leather that was sewn onto it. On the inner side, several darned spots were repaired with leather patches applies on using a fine running stitch. All these stitches were very carefully executed. On the other hand, the tear running across the whole coat was sewn a bit more carelessly with twisted sinew. Many similar cloaks to this one have been preserved, such as those of the Kayhausen Boy, the Elling Woman, the Haraldskær Woman, or the Jührdenerfeld Man.

The only grave good found with the girl was a single-row wooden comb with a wide handle. This was made relatively roughly from a piece of wood that was about 3 mm thick. Found in two pieces, it originally had a length of about 10 cm. The handle was curved and its surface was decorated with circular eyes and featured eyelets on both ends. A cord made from twisted wool was pulled through an eyelet and showed clear signs of wear, indicating it was probably part of a carrying implement.

== Scientific analysis ==
=== Body and health ===
The remains were identified as those of an adolescent girl, estimated from anthropological examination to have been about 12–14 years old at death. X-rays of her bones revealed eleven Harris lines, bands of increased bone density that can form when normal growth is temporarily interrupted. In 1986, anthropologist Helmut Wurm interpreted these as evidence that she had experienced repeated periods of inadequate nutrition while growing up.

Her preserved intestines also provided evidence about her health. In 1944, five years after her discovery, German parasitologist Lothar Szidat examined their contents and reported exceptionally well-preserved eggs from two species of intestinal parasite: the roundworm Ascaris lumbricoides and the whipworm Trichuris trichiura. Szidat described the whipworm infection as heavy and the roundworm infection as less severe.

Szidat compared the severity of the infections with contemporary studies of people living in rural East Prussia, the region where the girl had been found. Using these infection rates as a comparison, he estimated that she had been 15–19 years old at death, somewhat older than the 12–14-year estimate based on anthropological examination.

Szidat's examination of the Dröbnitz Girl was also an early study in paleoparasitology, the study of parasites preserved in ancient human and animal remains. A 2021 review by parasitologists Matthieu Le Bailly, Céline Maicher, Kévin Roche and Benjamin Dufour identified Szidat's work on the Dröbnitz Girl and the Karwinden Man as the second published paleoparasitological study, following the identification of parasite eggs in ancient Egyptian remains in 1910.

=== Diet ===
The preservation of the Dröbnitz Girl's stomach and intestines allowed researchers to reconstruct part of what she had eaten shortly before her death. After her discovery in 1939, Walter von Stokar and H. Gross examined the contents of her digestive system. Among the remains of her last meals, they identified plant material, peas and wheat, together with small amounts of meat and animal fat.

A modern study of wild plant use in Bronze and Early Iron Age Poland returned to the results of the 1940 analysis. It reported lungwort, shepherd's purse and an unidentified species of Rumex among the plants preserved inside the girl. These had been added to a porridge or pulp containing meat, cereals and peas.

Leaves and other soft parts of plants rarely survive at archaeological sites, but several were preserved in the Dröbnitz Girl's digestive system. Her remains are therefore among the few archaeological finds from Poland to preserve this kind of direct evidence of plant consumption.

Her bones provide evidence from an earlier part of her life. X-rays revealed eleven Harris lines. In 1986, anthropologist Helmut Wurm interpreted these as evidence that the adolescent girl had experienced periods of inadequate nutrition while growing up.

=== Dating ===
Because the body had been removed before archaeologists arrived at Dröbnitz in July 1939, its original depth and position within the peat layers had not been recorded. This meant that stratigraphic dating, which uses an object's position within layers of soil or peat, could not be used.

Researchers instead dated the find using two different methods. On 24 July 1939, nine days after the discovery, biologist H. Groß collected peat samples from the site. He compared pollen in peat still adhering to the body with pollen from a peat column taken about 8 metres (26 feet) from where the girl had been found. His pollen analysis placed her deposition in the bog at approximately 500 BCE.

Archaeologist Wolfgang La Baume separately dated the find by comparing the girl's wooden comb with Iron Age combs and images of combs on pottery and face urns from Central and Eastern Europe. His archaeological dating also placed the find at approximately 500 BCE. In 1955, archaeologist Karl Schlabow reported that the pollen analysis and archaeological comparison had independently produced the same approximate date.

Archaeologist Hans Jürgen Eggers assigned the find more broadly to the Ha D phase of the Hallstatt period, about 650–475 BCE. The approximately 500 BCE dates obtained from both pollen analysis and archaeological comparison fall within this period.

== Death and deposition ==
The cause of Dröbnitz Girl's death remains unknown. Examination of her remains did not establish how she died, and investigators identified no evidence of fatal violence.

The girl lay on her back, with her arms crossed over her chest and her head turned to the right. Her body was wrapped in a sheepskin cloak, and a wooden comb was found nearby. German archaeologist Wolfgang La Baume, who published the find in 1940, interpreted this arrangement as evidence of deliberate burial rather than ritual sacrifice.

Such a burial would have been unusual in the region, where cremation was the prevailing funerary practice during the Early Iron Age. La Baume suggested that the girl may have been buried outside a conventional cemetery for reasons that remain unknown.

Peat samples taken from her back contained the remains of aquatic organisms, suggesting that her body had been placed in a shallow pool that subsequently filled with vegetation and peat.

The interpretation of bog bodies as burials or ritual sacrifices remains a subject of archaeological debate. In 1955, German archaeologist Karl Schlabow included Dröbnitz Girl among young individuals interpreted as burials. Later scholarship, including German archaeologist Stefan Burmeister's 2007 study, has examined the difficulties of identifying human sacrifice from archaeological evidence alone.

Neither the circumstances of her death nor the purpose of her deposition has been established.

== See also ==
- List of bog bodies
- Windeby I, a bog body found in Germany.
- Osterby Man, the preserved head of a c. 1st century BCE man found in Schleswig-Holstein.
- Girl of the Uchter Moor, found in 2000 in Uchte, Germany.
- Kayhausen Boy, the body of a young Iron age child found in Lower Saxony.
