= Osterby Man =

Bog body

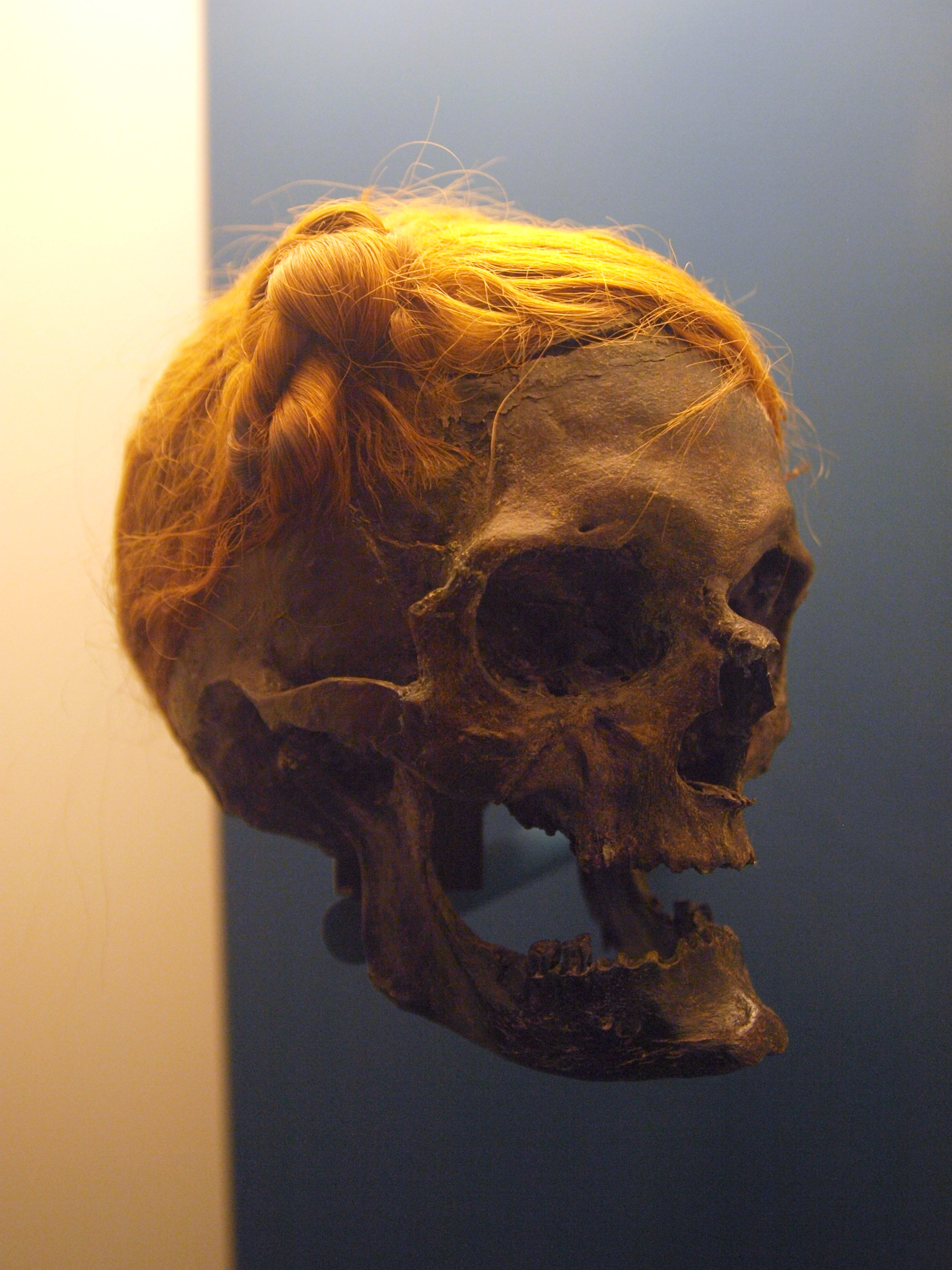
- The preserved head of Osterby Man
- Born: c. 75–130 CE
- Died: c. 75–130 CE near Osterby, Schleswig-Holstein, present-day Germany
- Cause of death: Blunt-force trauma and decapitation
- Body discovered: 26 May 1948 near Osterby, Schleswig-Holstein, Germany; 54°26′51″N 09°46′09″E
- Known for: Preserved Suebian knot hairstyle

Osterby Man, or the Osterby Head, is an Iron Age bog body discovered in 1948 near Osterby in Schleswig-Holstein, Germany. Only the skull and hair survived, the latter preserved in a distinctive Suebian knot associated with the Germanic Suebi. Radiocarbon dating places the remains between 75 and 130 CE, and evidence of blunt-force trauma and decapitation suggests deliberate execution. The head is at the State Archaeological Museum at Gottorf Castle in Schleswig, Schleswig-Holstein.

== Discovery ==
The head was discovered on 26 May 1948 by Otto and Max Müller of Osterby, who were cutting peat on their father's land, at 54°26′51″N 09°46′09″E. It was found approximately 65 to 70 centimetres (2 ft 2 in to 2 ft 4 in) beneath the current ground level. The head was wrapped in fragments of a deerskin cape, which Max Müller noticed protruding from the peat. The find was reported to the museum in Schleswig; despite intensive searching by the brothers and others, no more of the body has been found.

== Description and analysis ==
=== Anthropology ===
The skull had been broken into several pieces. The acids in the bog have decalcified the bone, which has shrunk somewhat and is dark brown. The hair and small sections of scalp are well preserved, but the skin and other soft tissues of the face have disappeared. There is a large wound on the left side of the head, which may have been fatal: the skull had been depressed by a blow with a blunt object over an area approximately 12 centimetres (4.7 in) in diameter, and the bone of the left temple was shattered with splinters penetrating the brain area. The skull had also been deformed by the weight of the peat above it, but the facial area was generally well preserved. Skeletal evidence suggests a man 50 to 60 years of age. Hack marks on the second cervical vertebra show that the head was cut off. The skull was stabilised for exhibition by filling with gypsum.

The hair is thin and slightly wavy, 28 centimetres (11 in) long. It had been coloured a reddish brown by the acids in the bog; microscopic analysis showed that it had been dark blond and that the man had had some white hairs. In a re-examination in 2005, isotopic analysis showed that at least during his last year of life, the man ate meat remarkably rarely, and did not eat seafood. Parasitological analysis of the hair showed no head lice, unusual for the time.

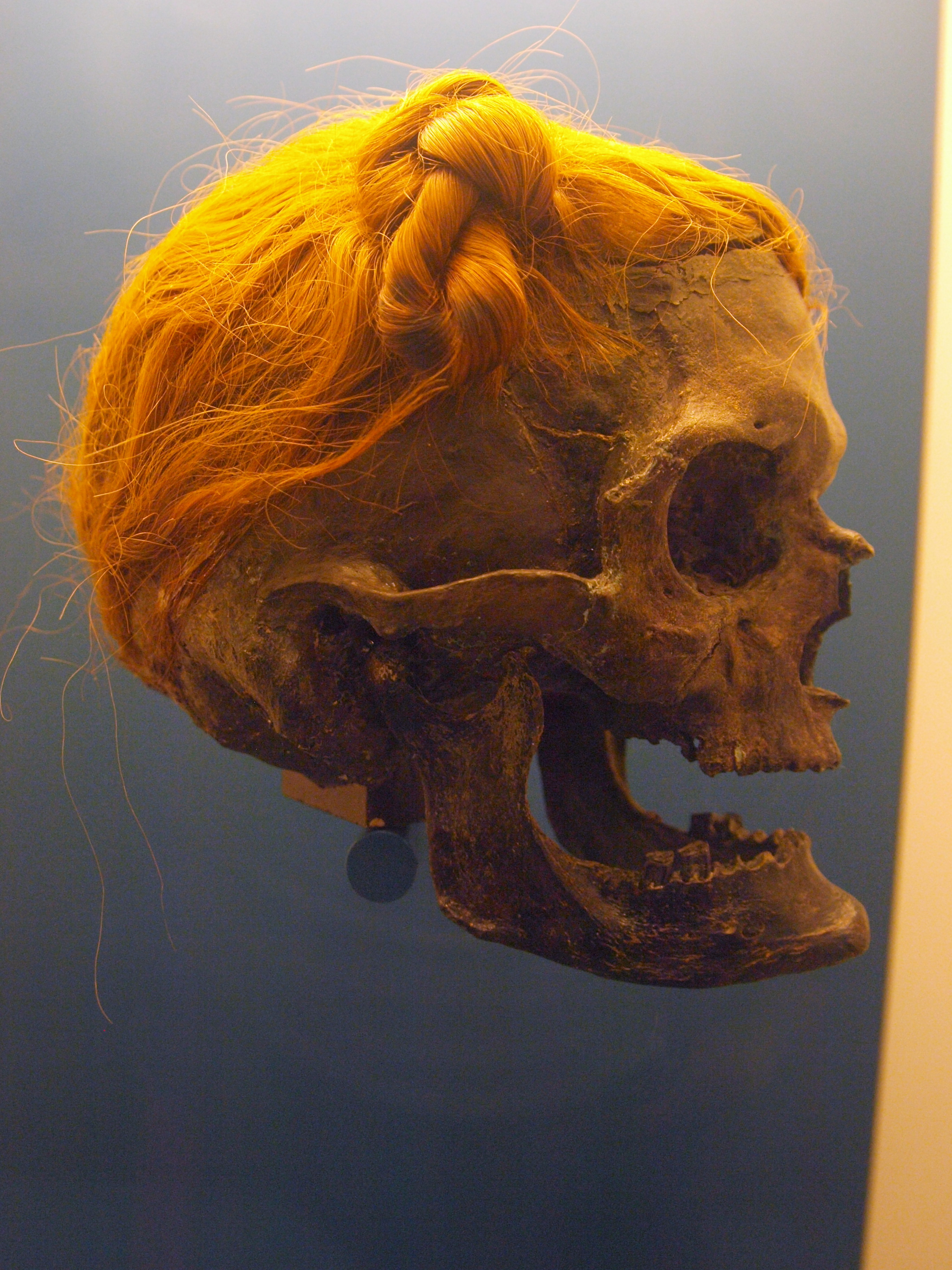
Side view showing Suebian knot

=== Hairstyle ===
The hair is unusually well preserved and is tied above the right temple in a Suebian knot. Tacitus describes this in Chapter 38 of his Germania as a characteristic of free men among the Germanic tribe of Suebi. The knot appears in several Roman depictions and on at least one other bog body, Dätgen Man (who wore his on the back of his head). Osterby has featured the Suebian knot on its coat of arms since 1998.

=== Skin cape ===
The skull was wrapped in fragments of a garment, measuring approximately 40 by 53 centimetres (16 by 21 in), consisting of tanned pieces of leather sewn together. Microscopic analysis suggested, based on the hairs, that they were from roe deer. The neck opening was lined with a strip of leather about 1 centimetre (0.39 in) wide. All seams had been sewn with small stitches in catgut. Some appeared to be repairs. Textile archaeologists identified the garment as a skin cape; similar cloaks or capes have been found with other archaeological finds, including Elling Woman, Haraldskær Woman, Dröbnitz Girl, Kayhausen Boy and Jührdenerfeld Man.

=== Treatment ===
Peter Löhr performed the anthropological analysis, which determined that the skull had shrunk while immersed in the bog. For his doctoral dissertation, he performed experiments on it involving repeated soaking and drying and detailed measurements; in his view, soaking caused it to swell to almost its original dimensions. Löhr's data included markedly shrunk teeth and the complete lower jaw associated with the skull, which has a protruding chin. However, more recent analysis has shown that in his original preparation of the skull for exhibition, Karl Schlabow added an unrelated lower jaw.

=== Dating ===
The Suebian knot indicates the man died in the Late Iron Age or the Roman period, and radiocarbon dating likewise indicates a date between 75 and 130 CE; however, the hair sample used was taken from Alfred Dieck's private collection and may thus be unreliable.

== Analysis ==
Other Iron Age bog bodies have also been beheaded; the body of Dätgen Man, who also had a Suebian knot, was found several metres from his head. The beheading together with the fractured skull indicates deliberate execution by multiple methods. It is impossible to determine whether Osterby Man was sunk in the bog as a judicial punishment or a sacrifice, or whether his body was also deposited in the bog, but it has been suggested that his relatively advanced age may indicate an honourable death.

== See also ==
- List of bog bodies
