= Jührdenerfeld Man =

Bog body found in Germany

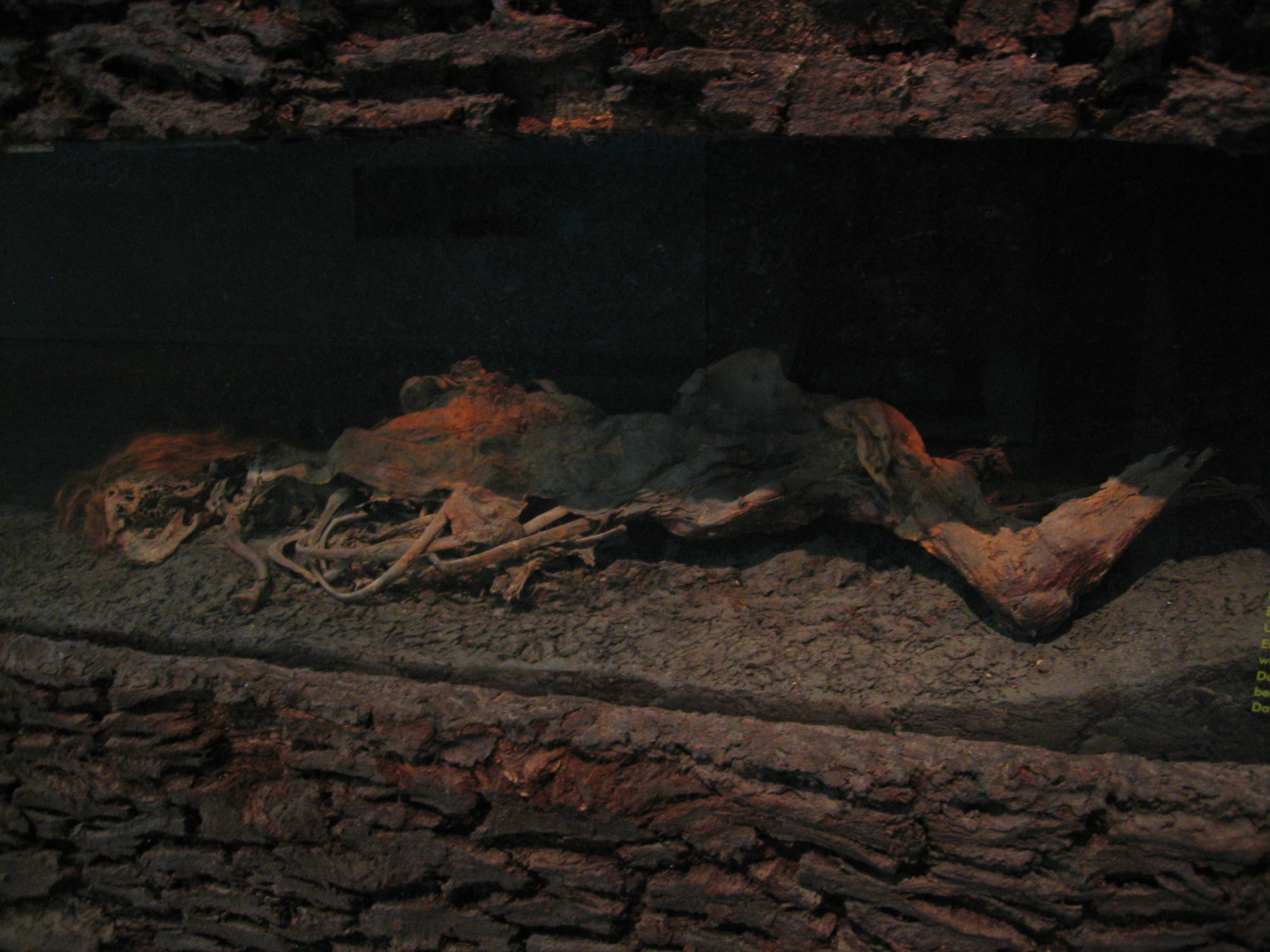
- Exhibition of the Jührdenerfeld man in a museum
- Died: Jührdenerfeld, Lower Saxony, Germany
- Body discovered: 19 November 1934; 53°19′34.3″N 8°0′7.8″E
- Era: c. 170 BCE–25 CE

The Jührdenerfeld Man (German: Mann aus Jührdenerfeld) is a bog body found in Jührdenerfeld, a village in the district of Bockhorn, Lower Saxony in Germany. Today it rests at the State Museum for Nature and Man in Oldenburg as Inventory No. OL 5933.

== Discovery ==
The Jührdenerfeld Man was discovered by a peat cutter Heinrich Stöfer in Wapeldorf, Ammerland on 19 November 1934 while digging a drainage ditch in the raised bog. The following day he was brought to the State Museum for Nature and Man. The body lay in a lengthened natural depression in the bog. On him lay three thick, pointed wooden stakes that were about 160 cm long and as thick as an arm, made from alder and rowan. One of the stakes lay lengthwise over the body, and the others were wedged across at the height of the arms and pelvis at the sides of the depression, in order to hold the body down in place.

== Scientific analysis ==
The man was found lying in a curled-up position on his right side with his left leg bent. Both the arms and the right leg were missing, probably due to animal scavenging. Small pieces of the arm were found next to the body. He was about medium height and around 35 years old at the time of his death. The about 15 cm long hair and moustache that were originally blonde were well preserved and stained red from the bog. On the back and the chest, most of the skin is still preserved in a leather-like state. In other parts of the body it has shrunk due to the intestines, muscles, and fatty tissue had been lost to the bog. The man was discovered mostly unclothed, but he was covered with a wool cloth and a sheepskin shoulder cloak. There are many other cloaks found similarly with the Elling Woman, Kayhausen Boy, Haraldskaer Woman, and the Dröbnitz Girl. His clothing was possibly made out of linen or other plant fibres that perished due to the acids in the bog.

=== Dating ===
According to pollen analysis, the time of death was around 400 BCE to 1 BCE. Newer radiocarbon dating investigation with various samples from the body could narrow this date range down. A sample from the skin showed a range of 170 BCE–45 BCE, while a hair sample showed 55 BCE–25 BCE.

== See also ==
- List of bog bodies
- Kayhausen Boy, the body of a young Iron age child found in Lower Saxony.
- Girl of the Uchter Moor, found in 2000 in Uchte, Lower Saxony.
- Dröbnitz Girl, the body of a girl found in East Prussia.
