= Wijnand van der Sanden =

Dutch archaeologist and prehistorian (born 1953)

Wijnand Antonius Bernardus van der Sanden. PhD
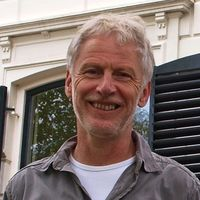
- Dr. Wijnand van der Sanden
- Born: 21 September 1953 (age 72); Geldrop, North Brabant, the Netherlands
- Education: University of Groningen; University of Leiden; Radboud University Nijmegen
- Occupations: Archaeologist, Conservator

Dr. Wijnand Antonius Bernardus van der Sanden (born 1953 in Geldrop) is a Dutch archaeologist and prehistorian.

After graduating he studied history of arts and classical archaeology at the Radboud University Nijmegen, later he studied prehistory at the University of Groningen and the University of Leiden where he gained his doctorate in 1990 with a thesis on Dutch bog body finds from the Bronze Age to the Roman period Mens en moeras: veenlijken in Nederland van de bronstijd tot en met de Romeinse tijd. From 1987 to 1997 van der Sanden was curator of the archaeological department of the Drents Museum in Assen. Since 1997 he has been the provincial archaeologist of the province Drenthe. Van der Sanden was a member of the Werkgroep Hunebedden (Woprking group Megalithics) from 1988 to 1999 and since 1988 has been editor-in-chief of the archaeological section of the Nieuwe Drentse Volksalmanak.

Since 1987 van der Sanden has been working on scientific studies relating to archaeological bog finds in the province of Drenthe and continued his studies in this area, which was also the subject of his doctorate thesis. In 1995, as a guest curator, he organised a special exhibition at Silkeborg Museum in Denmark on North-West European bog body finds and he edited the catalogue Vereeuwigd in het veen. (English title Through nature to eternity.) Since 1990 van der Sanden has been working on the scientific verification of find records and archaeological finds of bog bodies in the Netherlands and Germany, especially from the nachlass of the German scientist Alfred Dieck. Wijnand van der Sanden has also published several works on Neolithic cultures of the Netherlands. Wijnand van der Sanden is also a member of various thesis committees for different universities and supervises students in their research.

== Works ==
- van der Sanden, Wijnand (1990). Mens en moeras: veenlijken in Nederland van de bronstijd tot en met de Romeinse tijd. Assen: Drents Museum. ISBN 90-70884-31-3.
- van der Sanden, Wijnand; Vilsteren, Vincent van (2002). Archeologie in Drenthe Themanummer Veenvondsten (in Dutch). Assen.
- van der Sanden, Wijnand; Capelle, Torsten (2002). Götter, Götzen, Holzmenschen (in German). Oldenburg: Isensee. ISBN 3-89598-851-0.
- J. van der Plicht, W. A. B. van der Sanden, A. T. Aerts and H. J. Streurman, "Dating bog bodies by means of 14C-AMS", Journal of Archaeological Science Volume 31, Issue 4, April 2004, Pages 471–491
- van der Sanden, Wijnand (2005). Hunebedden: monumenten van een steentijdcultuur (in Dutch). Abcoude: Uniepers. ISBN 90-6825-333-6.
- van der Sanden, Wijnand; Eisenbeiß, Sabine (2006). "Imaginary people - Alfred Dieck and the bog bodies of northwest Europe". Archäologisches Korrespondenzblatt. 36: 111–122. ISSN 0342-734X.
- van der Sanden, Wijnand (2007). Reuzenstenen op de es: de Hunebedden van Rolde (in Dutch). Zwolle: Waanders. ISBN 978-90-400-8367-9.
- van der Sanden, Wijnand; Luning, H. (2010). Over galg en rad (in Dutch). Zwolle: WBOOKS. ISBN 9789040085758.
- van der Sanden, Wijnand; Dekkers, Hans (2012). Gids voor de hunebedden in Drenthe en Groninge (in Dutch). Zwolle: WBOOKS. ISBN 978-90-400-0704-0.
