= Alvania nonsculpta =

Scientific classification
- Kingdom: Animalia
- Phylum: Mollusca
- Class: Gastropoda
- Subclass: Caenogastropoda
- Order: Littorinimorpha
- Family: Rissoidae
- Genus: Alvania
- Species: A. nonsculpta

Binomial name
- Alvania nonsculpta Hoenselaar & Goud, 1998

Species of gastropod

Alvania nonsculpta is a species of minute sea snail, a marine gastropod mollusk or micromollusk in the family Rissoidae. Its name is derived from the fact that it has a near complete lack of sculpture.

== Description ==
The length of the shell varies between 2.2 mm and 3 mm. The shell is conical and pear-shaped with an angulated protoconch. The teleconch has about 3 convex whorls, quickly increasing in width. Spiral ridges and axial ribs begin to appear at the boundary of the protoconch and teleconch, forming a square-like pattern. The axial ribs slowly fade on the first teleconch line as growth lines become more apparent.

== Distribution ==
This species occurs in the Atlantic Ocean off the Azores. It was first described off of the island the Flores Island and found again off the island of Faial Island. It was observed at a depth range of 165-200 meters.
