= Suebian knot =

Historical male hairstyle ascribed to the Suebi

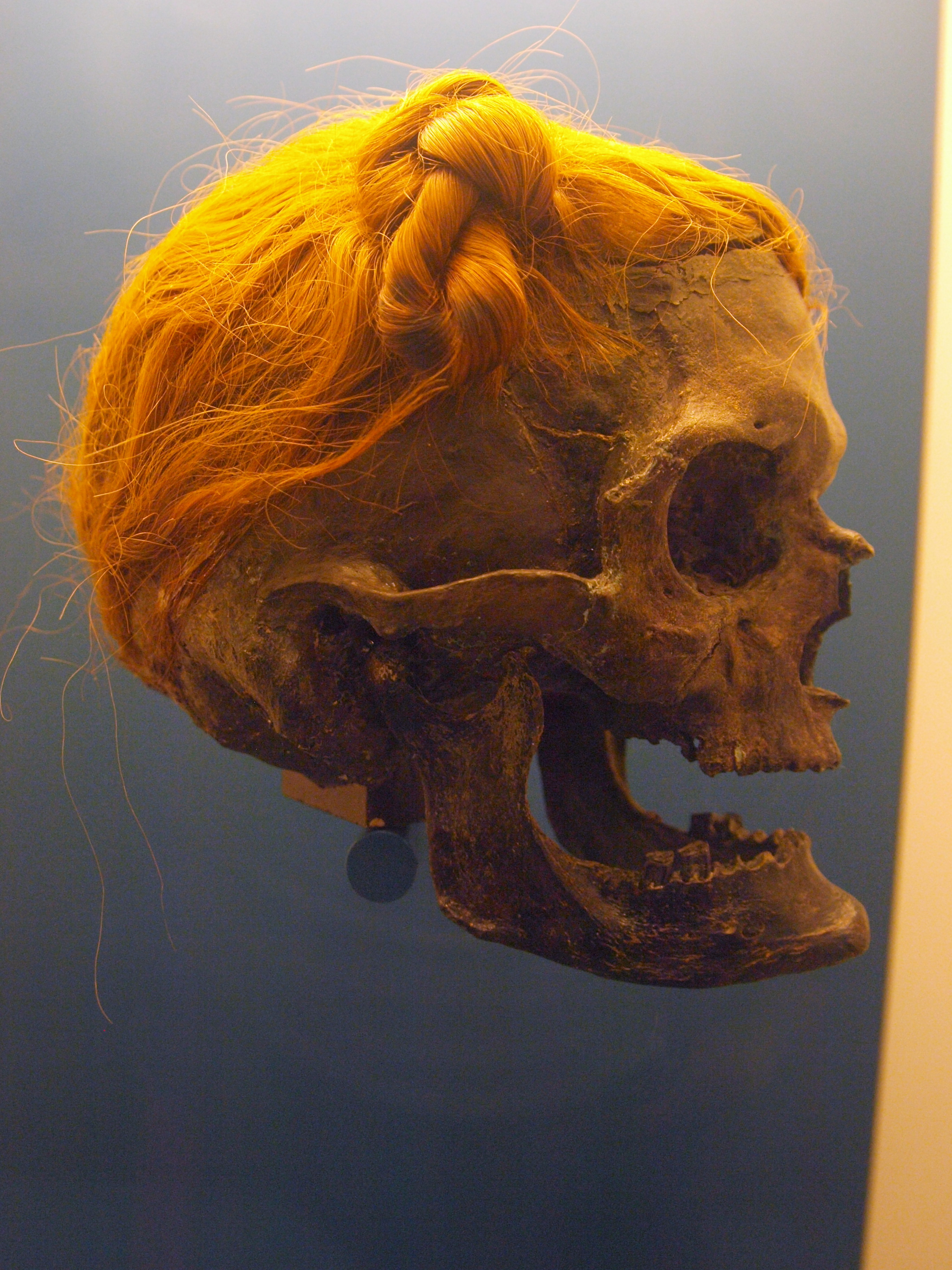
The Osterby Head with Suebian knot

The Suebian knot (German: Suebenknoten) is a historical male hairstyle ascribed to the tribe of the Germanic Suebi. The knot is attested by Tacitus in his 1st century AD work Germania, found on contemporary depictions of Germanic peoples, their art, and bog bodies.

== Tacitus ==
Roman historian Tacitus reports in Germania (98 CE) that the Suebian warriors combed their hair back or sideways and tied it into a knot, allegedly with the purpose of appearing taller and more awe-inspiring on the battlefield. Tacitus also reports that the fashion had spread to neighboring Germanic tribes among the younger warriors, while among the Suebians, the knot was sported even by old men as a status symbol, which "distinguishes the freeman from the slave", with the most artful knots worn by the most wealthy nobles:

Now I must treat of the Suebi, in whom are comprised not one tribe only, as with the Chatti and the Tencteri; for they occupy the greater part of Germany, and are also distinguished by special national names, though styled in general Suebi. One mark of the race is to comb the hair back over the side of the head and tie it low in a knot behind: this distinguishes the Suebi from other Germans, and the free-born of the Suebi from the slave. In other tribes, whether from some relationship to the Suebi, or, as often happens, from imitation, the same thing may be found; but it is rare and confined to the period of youth. Among the Suebi, even till the hair is grey, the rough locks are twisted backward, and often knotted on the very crown: the chieftains wear theirs somewhat more ornamentally, to this extent interested in appearances, but innocently so.

— Tacitus, Germania, 38.

Therefore, the Suebian knot was a sign of identity, and not only of ethnic, but also of social identity and status.

== Archaeological record ==
A number of bog bodies have been found with hair dressed in Suebian knots:

- Osterby Man, 70–220 AD of Osterby near Rendsburg-Eckernförde, Schleswig-Holstein, Germany
- Dätgen Man, 135–385 AD, of Dätgen, near Rendsburg-Eckernförde, Schleswig-Holstein, Germany

== Styling ==
Tropaeum Traiani
Two scenes of a Roman legionary battling Dacian allies
above a fallen Germanic warrior with Suebian knot
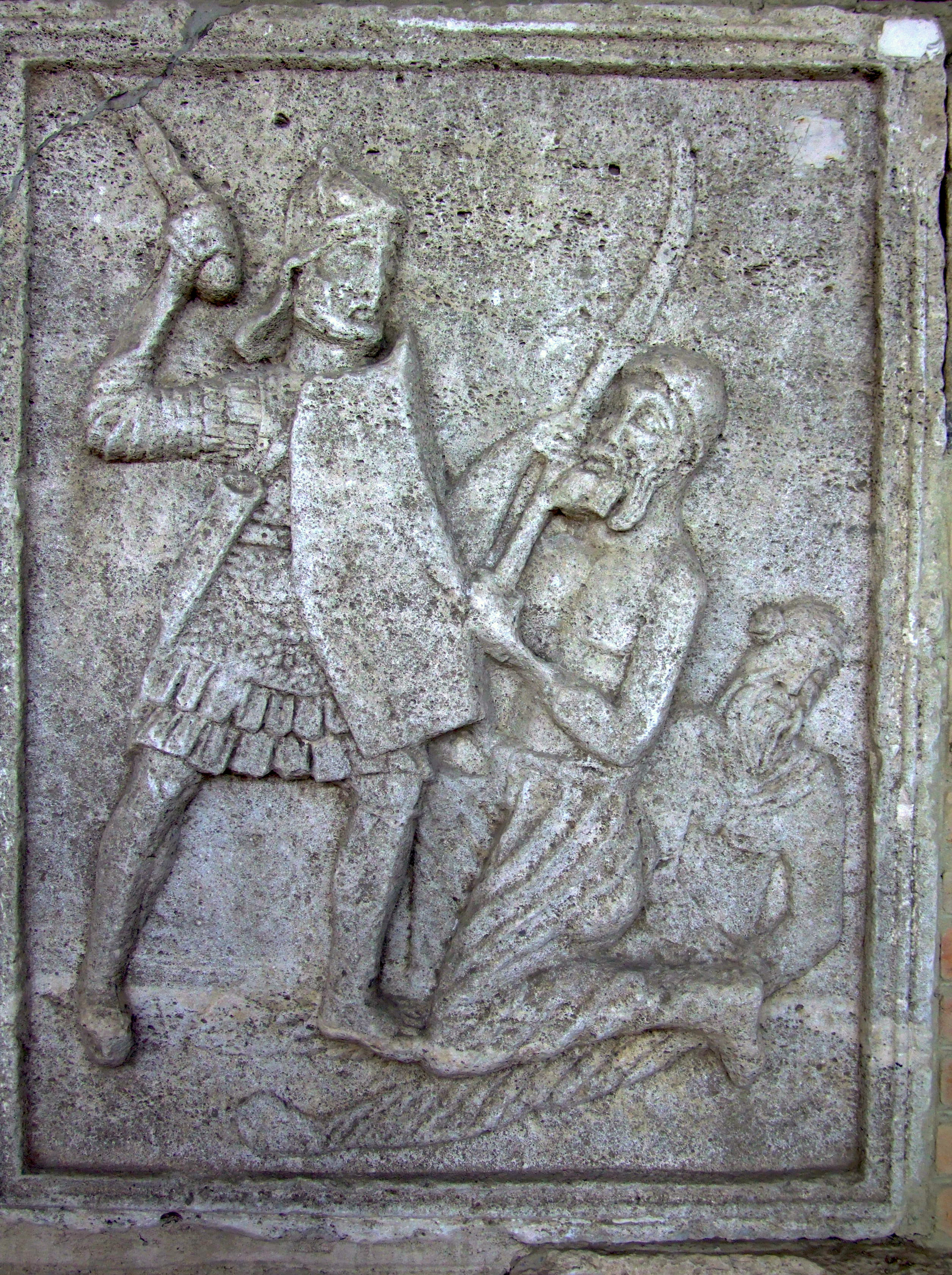
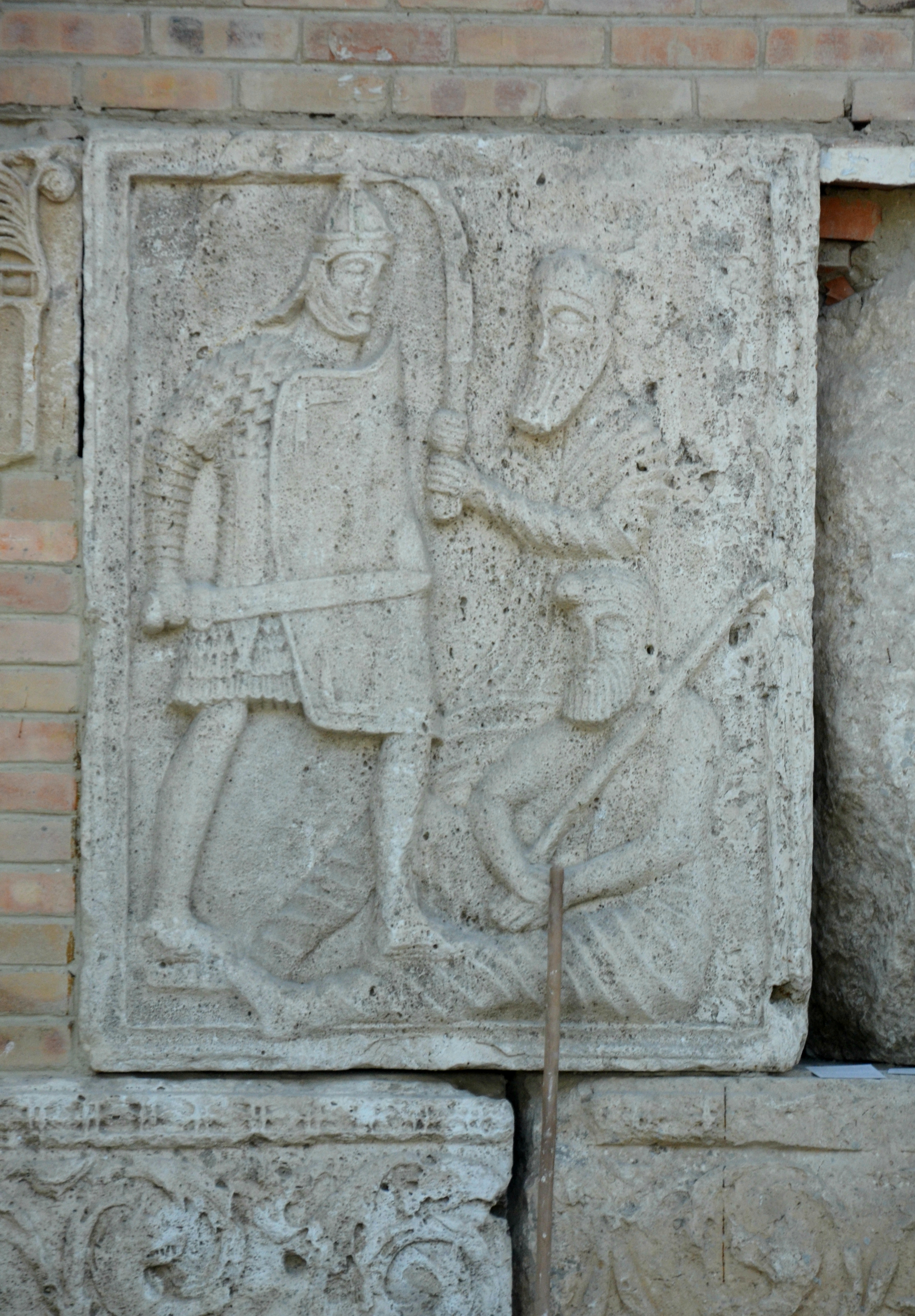

The hair is divided at the back in two uniform strands, slicked and laid in opposite directions around the head. On one side of the head, usually in the temporal region, the two strands are individually tightened in the same direction. The two strands are then twisted, whereby the rotation of the two individual strands loosens somewhat. A loop is formed from the resulting braid and the excess braid end is put in a loop through the loop. By natural untwisting the resulting knot tightens and stops without further aids.

The Osterby Man had male-pattern hair loss and very long and thin hair. Experimental archaeological tests with this hairstyle showed that the Suebian knot holds just as well even with very long and thin hair, as in the bog body. Some hair grease improves the durability of the hairstyle.

== Depictions ==
Historical depictions are found on the Trajan column, the Tropaeum Traiani relief, and a bronze sculpture of a kneeling German in the Bibliothèque nationale de France.

Three well-known examples can be found on bronze cauldrons that were produced in Roman workshops, but found in graves far outside of the Roman empire: in the chieftain's grave at Mušov (Czech Republic), in a Treetrunk coffin in Czarnówko (Poland) and in Kariv (Ukraine).

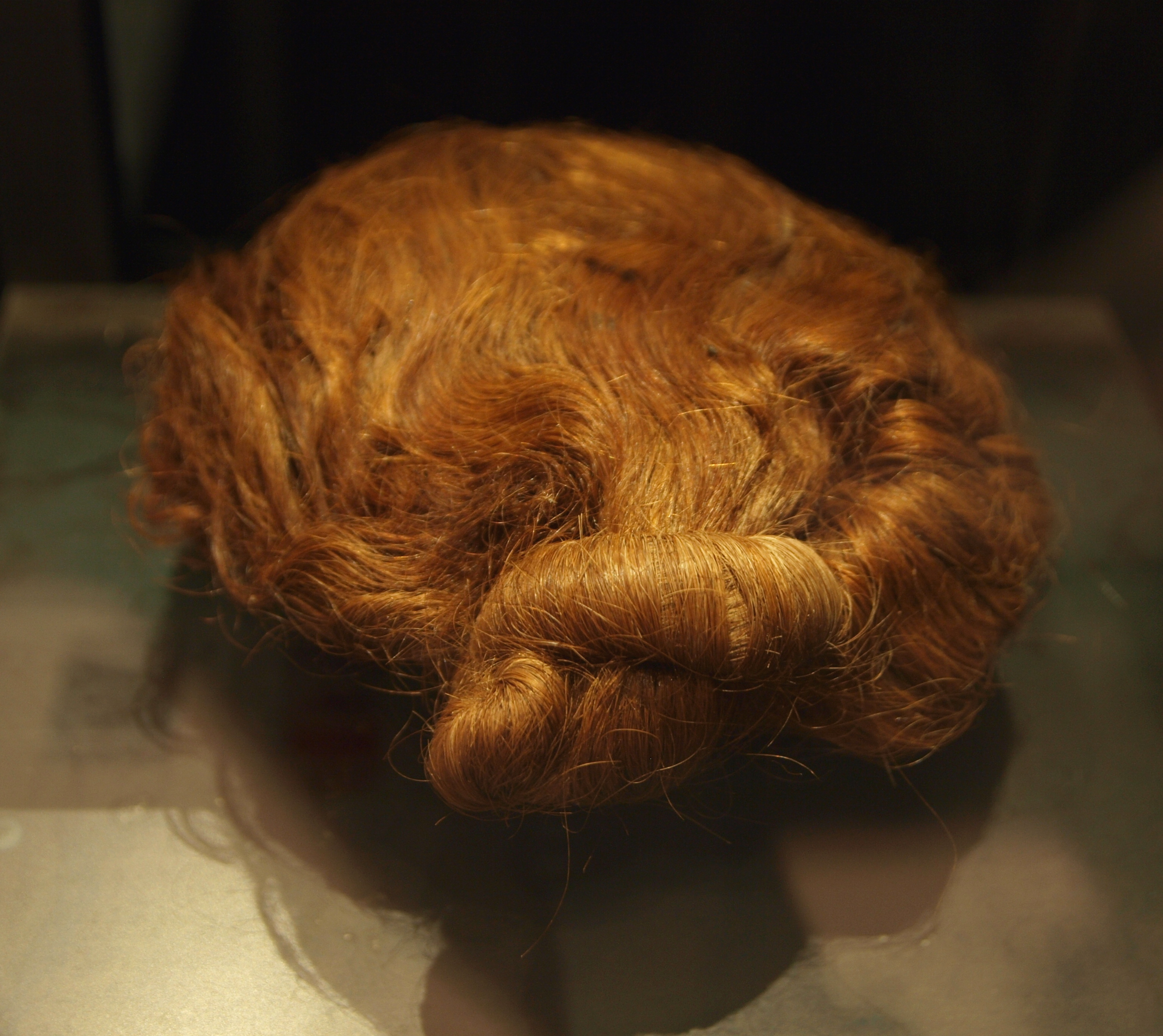
Hair of Dätgen Man, 135–385 AD, found in Germany

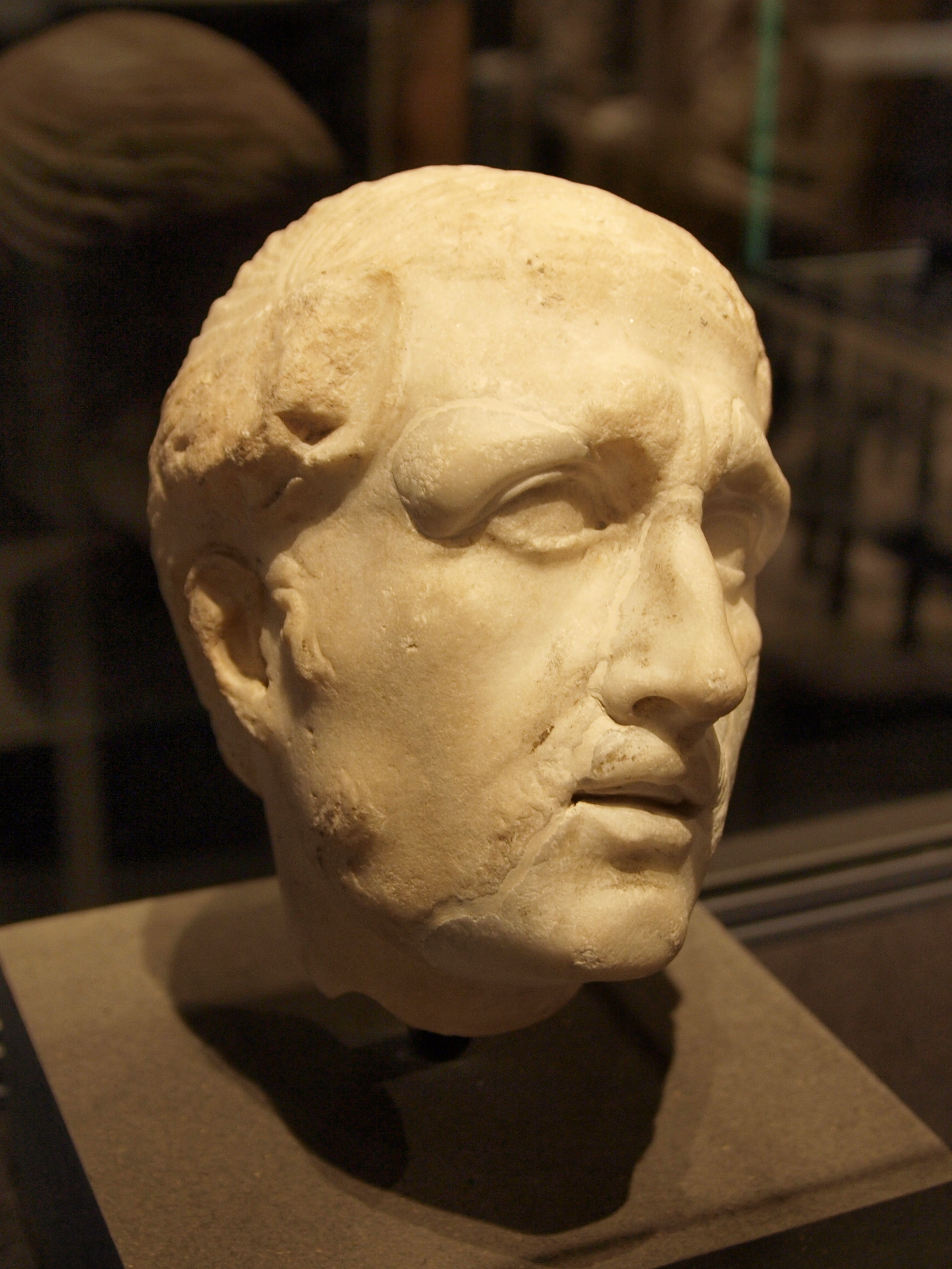
Marble head (1st/2nd century AD) found in Somzée, Wallonia, Belgium

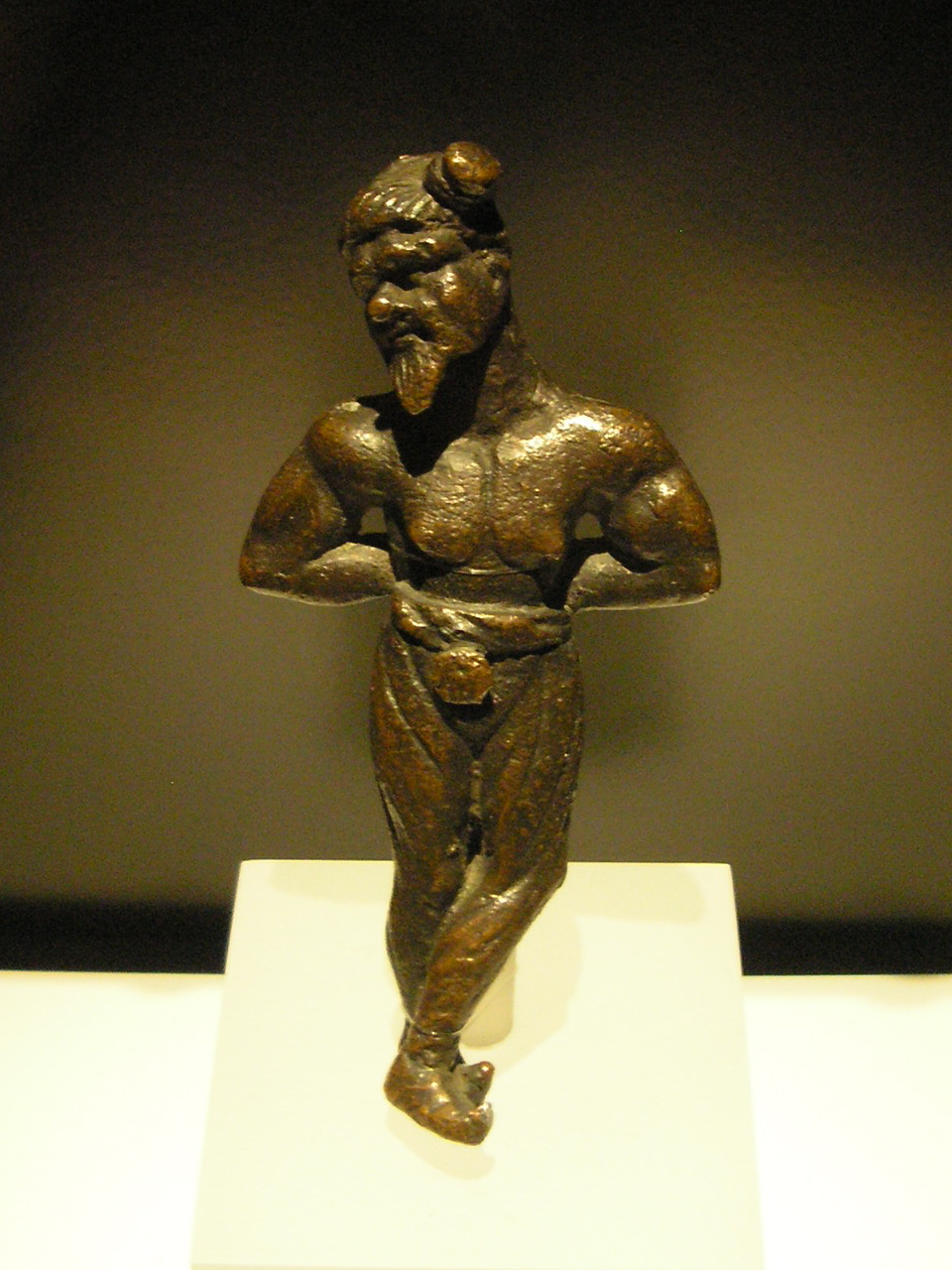
German at Wien Museum (2nd century AD)

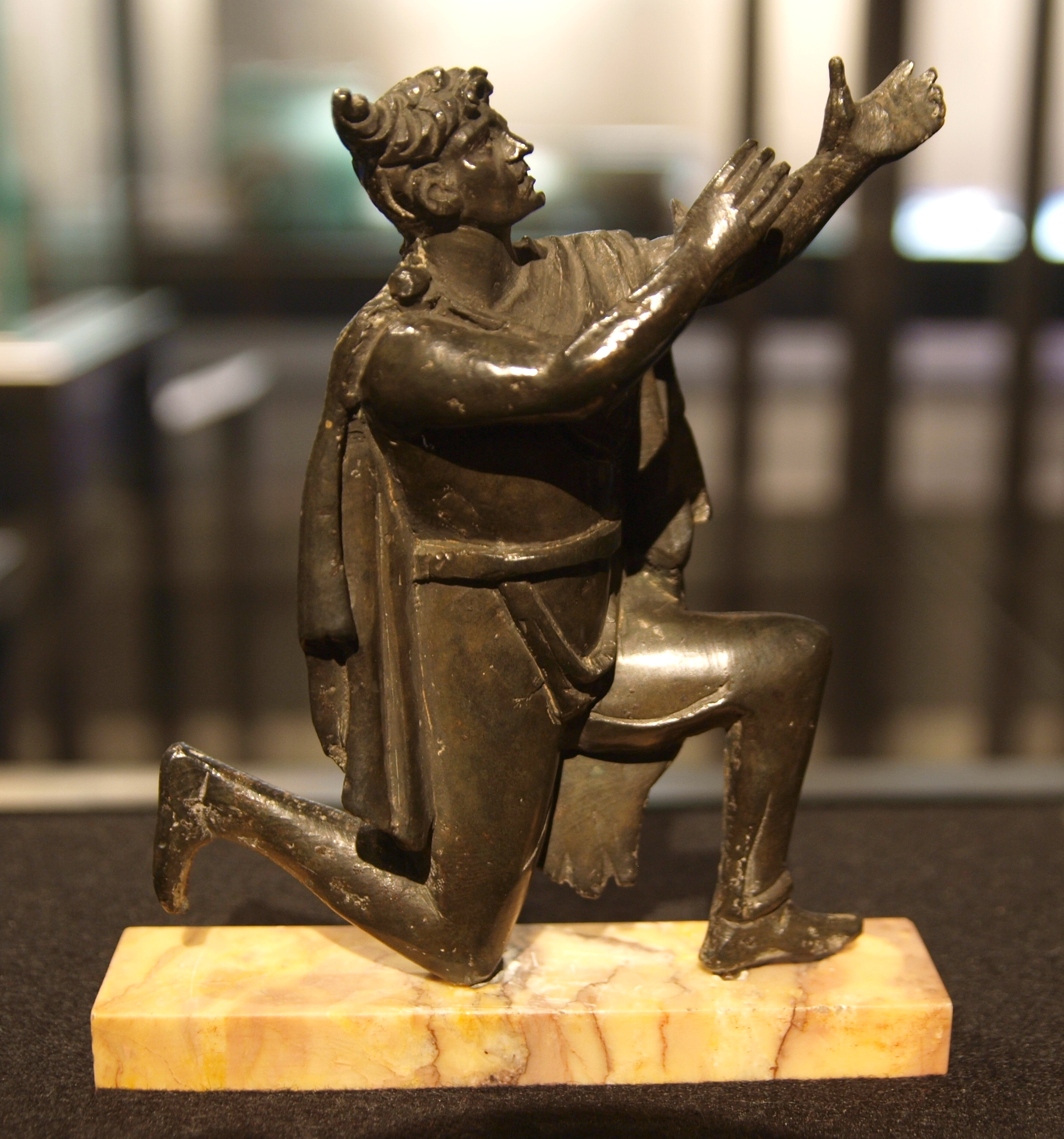
Roman bronze figurine, 1st/2nd century AD (Bibliothèque nationale de France)

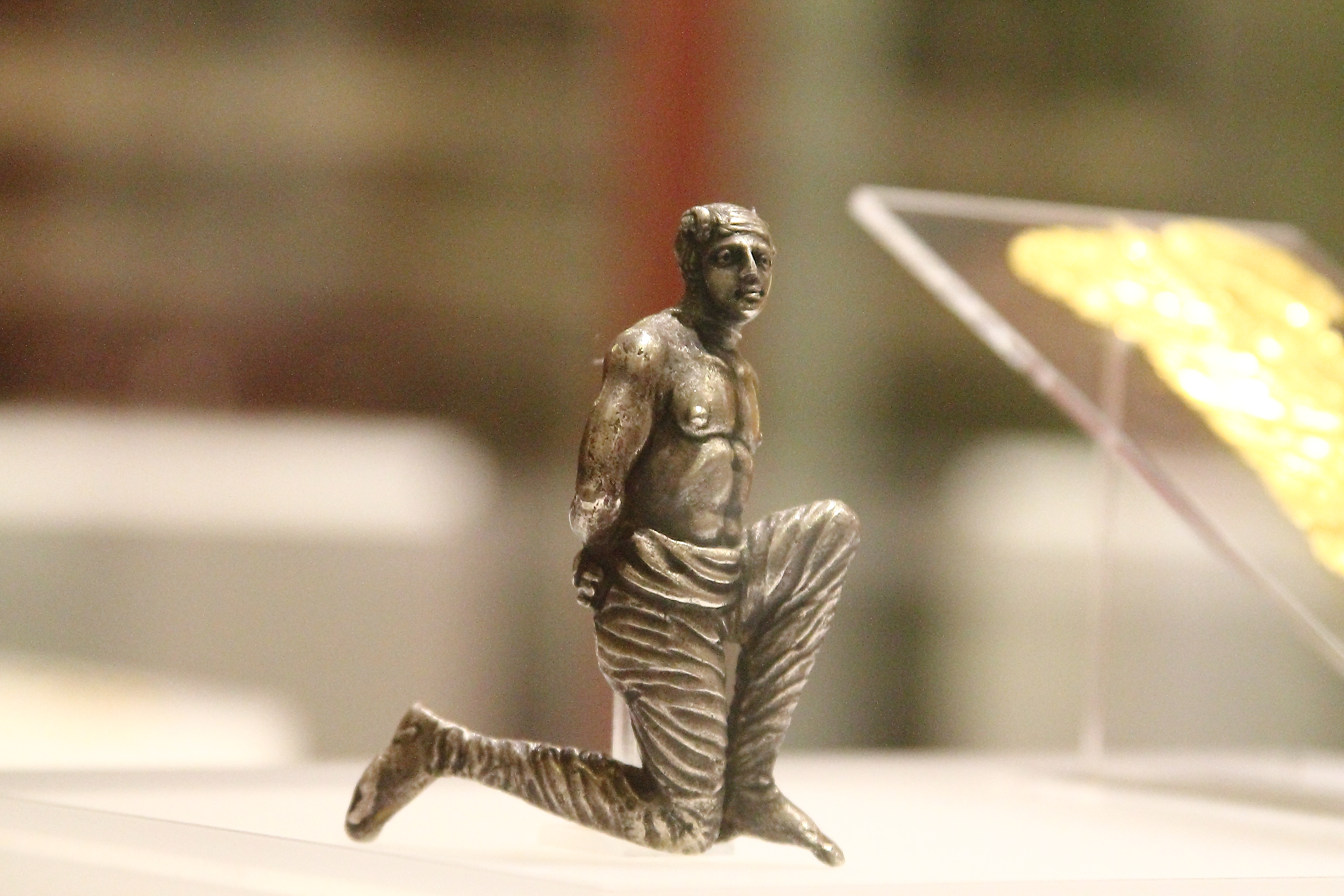
War captive with Suebian knot (National Museum of Romanian History)

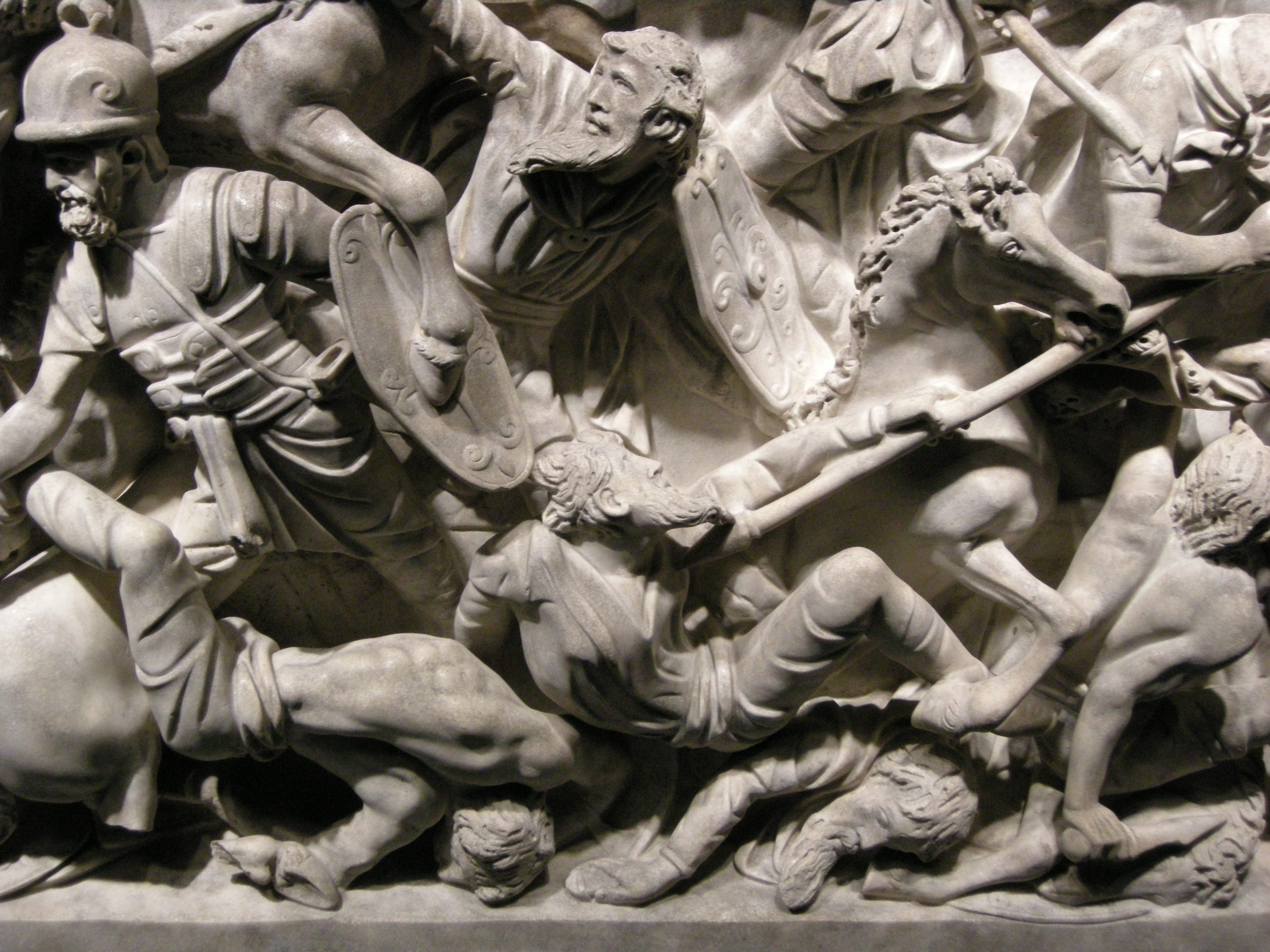
Detail from the Portonaccio sarcophagus (c. 180 AD)

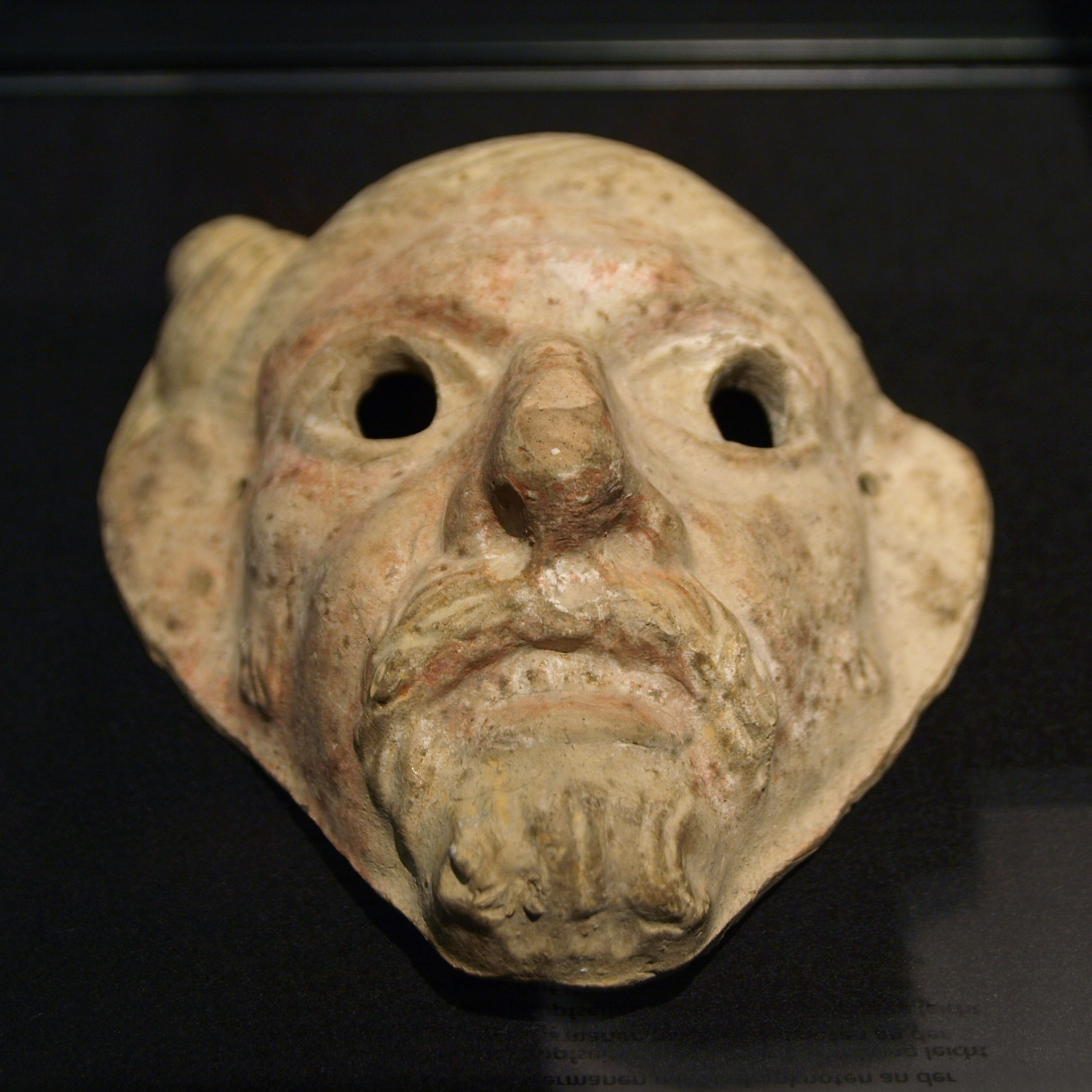
Terra cotta mask, 2nd century AD (British Museum)

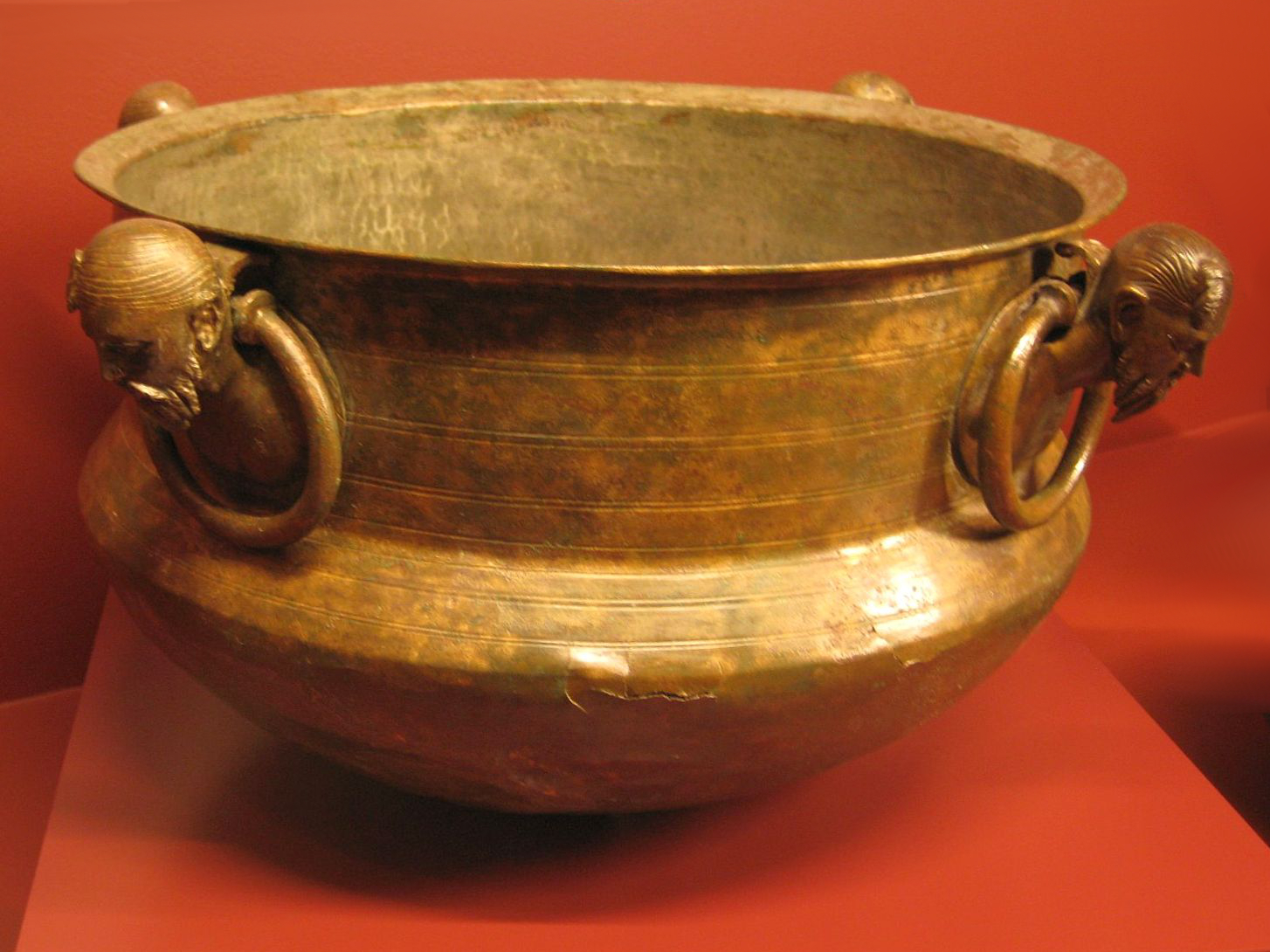
Mušov cauldron from a Germanic chieftain's grave, 2nd century AD

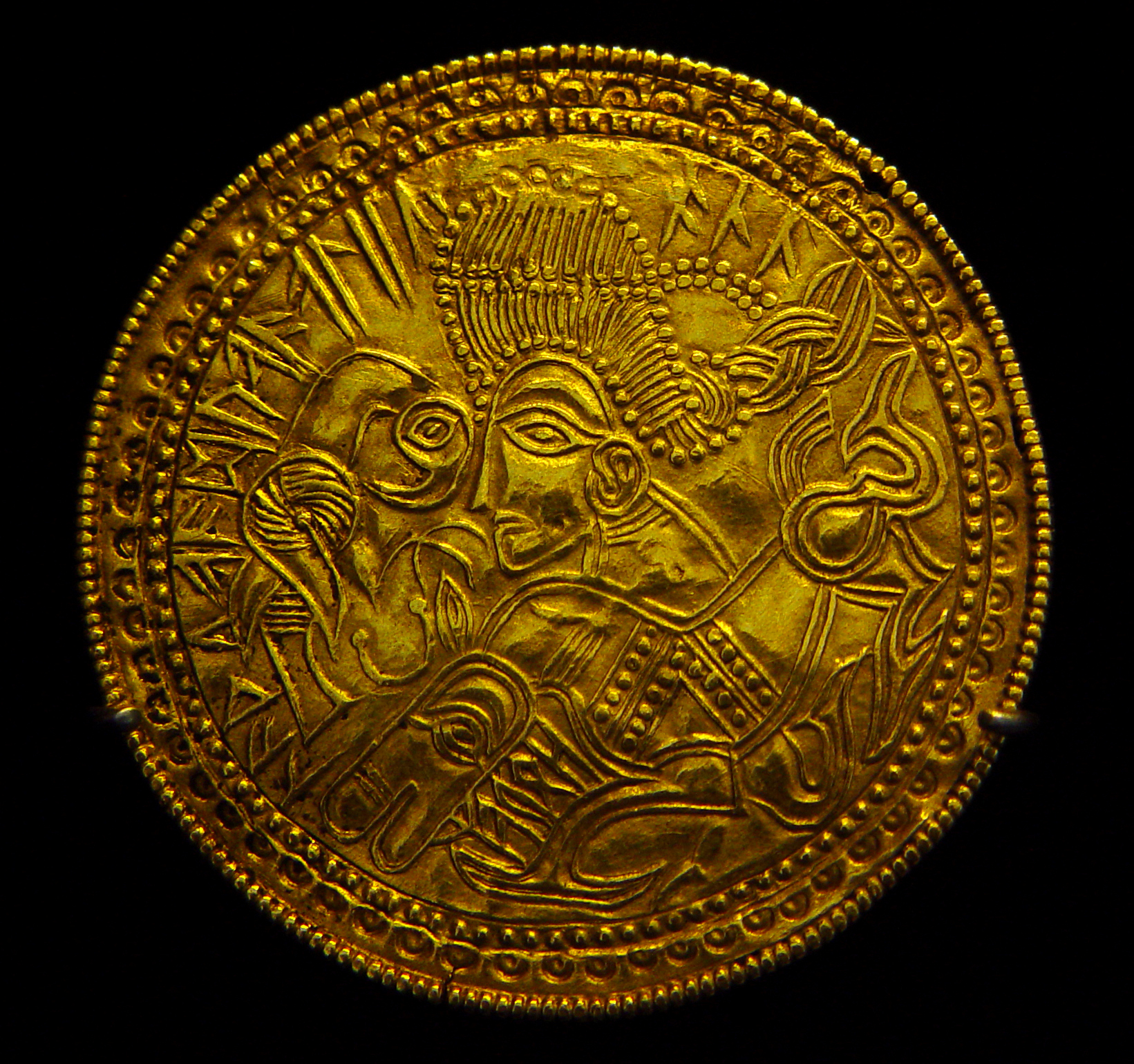
Stylized head with bird and horse on the Funen bracteate, Migration Period, 5th–7th centuries AD

Suebian knot on the coat of arms of Osterby, Schleswig-Holstein, Northern Germany (20th century)

== See also ==
- Oseledets
- Shikha (hairstyle)
- List of bog bodies
- List of hairstyles

== Bibliography ==
- Giles, Melanie (2020). Bog Bodies: Face to Face with the Past. Manchester: Manchester University Press. ISBN 978-1-5261-5018-9.
- Haak, Birte (2007). "Einige Bemerkungen zum so genannten „Suebenknoten"" [Some remarks on the so-called ‘Suebian knot’]. In Burmeister, Stefan; Derks, Heidrun; von Richthofen, Jasper (eds.). Zweiundvierzig. Festschrift für Michael Gebühr zum 65. Geburtstag. Rahden: Leidorf. pp. 175–180. ISBN 978-3-89646-425-5..
- Krierer, Karl R. (2017). ""Suebenköpfe". Mušov, Czarnówko, Kariv und das römische Germanenbild" [‘Suebi Heads’. Mušov, Czarnówko, Kariv and the Roman image of the Germanic people]. Bericht der Römisch-Germanischen Kommission. 98: 181–189. doi:10.11588/berrgk.2017.1.85515.
- Mączyńska, Magdalena; Rudnicka, Dorota (2004). "Ein Grab mit römischen Importen aus Czarnówko, Kr. Lêbork (Pommern)" [A Grave with Roman Imports from Czarnówko, Lêbork District (Pomerania)]. Germania. 82 (2): 397–429. (summary in German, English and French)
- Pohl, Walter (2006). "Telling the difference: Signs of ethnic identity". In Noble, Thomas F. X. (ed.). From Roman provinces to Medieval kingdoms. London: Routledge. pp. 99–138. ISBN 0-415-32741-5.
- Schlabow, Karl (1949). "Haartracht und Pelzschulterkragen der Moorleiche von Osterby" [Hairstyle and fur shoulder collar of the bog body from Osterby]. Offa. 8: 3–7. ISSN 0078-3714.
- Schuster, Jan (2018). Czarnówko, Fpl. 5. Acht Prunkgräber – Zeugnisse neuer Eliten im 2. Jh. n. Chr. im Ostseeraum [Czarnówko, findspot 5 Eight sumptuous tombs - evidence of new elites in the 2nd century AD in the Baltic region] (in German). Le̜bork-Warszawa: Muzeum w Le̜borku et al. ISBN 978-83-929977-9-5.
