= Kayhausen Boy =

Bog body found in Lower Saxony, Germany

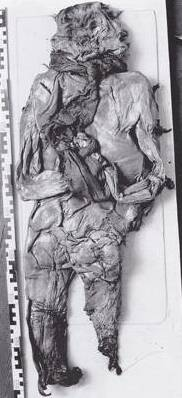
- Preserved remains of the Kayhausen Boy
- Born: Unknown
- Died: Between the 4th century BCE and 1st century BCE; Kayhauser Moor, Lower Saxony, Germany
- Known for: Iron Age bog body
- Height: 120 to 135 cm (3 ft 11 in to 4 ft 5 in)

Kayhausen Boy (German: Junge von Kayhausen) is the preserved body of a young child from the Iron Age, discovered in 1922 in the Kayhauser Moor, a raised sphagnum bog in Lower Saxony, Germany. He is one of the rare examples of a child preserved as a bog body.

Radiocarbon analysis and earlier pollen studies indicate that the child lived between the fourth century BCE and the first century BCE. Dental examination shows that he was no more than about seven and a half years old at the time of death and stood between 120 and 135 cm (3 ft 11 in and 4 ft 5 in) tall. The child had a chronic hip infection that would likely have restricted his mobility. Examination of the body indicates that he died from multiple stab wounds to the neck and had been bound with wool textiles and wrapped in a calfskin cloak before being placed in the bog.

== Discovery ==
The body of the Kayhausen Boy was discovered on 3 July 1922 in the Kayhauser Moor, a raised peat bog near the settlement of Kayhausen in present-day Lower Saxony, Germany. A peat cutter named Roggemann was working in an area where earlier peat extraction had already removed the upper 50 to 60 centimetres (20 to 24 in) of the bog. While cutting into deeper peat, about 120 centimetres (3 ft 11 in) below the surface, he uncovered a lower leg bone together with fragments of a calfskin cloak. Realizing that he had found a human body, he exposed the remains, which lay extended on their back within the compacted peat.

Roggemann notified Sandstede, the representative of the local museum in Bad Zwischenahn. Sandstede then contacted archaeologist J. Martin, Director of the State Museum for Natural History and Prehistory in Oldenburg. Martin arrived the following day to examine and photograph the find in situ. Because the peat had begun to dry and the remains were fragile, the body was removed promptly for further study.

The extraction of the remains proved difficult. The peat was tightly compacted around the arms, and both hands tore away as Roggemann freed the rest of the body. Scattered bones from the hands were later recovered from the peat block. Once the body had been lifted, Roggemann transported it by wheelbarrow to Bad Zwischenahn. Curious locals asked about the discovery as he passed, unaware that the body itself was lying under a covering on the barrow.

The remains were temporarily stored in a side room of a local guesthouse, where the body attracted considerable public attention. Numerous visitors viewed it and some removed small bones and fingernails as souvenirs. After several days, the remains and associated textiles were transferred to the museum in Oldenburg. A physician examined the body, and a textile specialist documented the wool bindings and calfskin cloak. Although these early reports have not survived, later analyses preserved the essential details of the find and the circumstances of its recovery.

== Condition and preservation ==
When the body reached the museum, the front of the torso had darkened to brown from brief exposure to air and sunlight, while the back remained pale grey. The acidic bog water had decalcified the skeleton, leaving the remains compressed to a height of only 5 to 8 centimetres (2.0 to 3.1 in). Soft tissues such as muscle and fat had decomposed, but the skin envelope survived in a swollen, porous condition shaped by centuries of immersion in the peat.

The hair had turned reddish due to chemical reactions in the bog, though small patches of the original dark blond color remained visible. The skull and facial tissues were distorted by long-term compression. The ears were lost during the find, and most teeth and nails had detached by the time the body reached the museum. Despite these losses, the preservation of skin, hair, and textile fibres provided a rare level of detail about the child's physical condition at death.

== Associated objects and clothing ==
The Kayhausen Boy was found tightly bound in several layers of wool textile. Thick wool strips secured his forearms behind his back, while additional lengths were looped around the neck and passed between the legs before being tied again at the throat. A separate knotted loop of fine wool was recovered beside the body.

His feet had been bound using a calfskin cloak, similar in form to cloaks associated with other Iron Age bog bodies such as the Elling Woman and the Haraldskær Woman. No metal objects or personal ornaments were found with the body, but the textiles provided important information. The wool bindings and the calfskin wrapping had been tied on after the stab wounds were made, showing that the child was deliberately bound before being placed in the bog.

== Scientific study ==
The Kayhausen Boy was a young child whose body remained preserved in the peat for more than two thousand years. A surviving molar from his dentition indicates that he was no older than about seven and a half years at the time of death. His preserved soft tissues and the proportions of his bones allow researchers to estimate that he stood between 120 cm (3 ft 11 in) and 135 cm (4 ft 5 in) in life.

Several scientific techniques have been used to determine when he lived. Early pollen analysis placed him broadly within the Roman Iron Age. Later radiocarbon dating of hair, bone, and textile samples refined this range to between the fourth century BCE and the first century BCE. One textile sample was later shown to be modern contamination introduced after excavation, but the remaining samples consistently support a late Iron Age context.

Chemical signatures preserved in some of his bones were compared with the geological environment of the find site using isotope analysis. The vertebrae that had been dry preserved retained reliable geochemical values. These match those of the surrounding region, indicating that the child likely spent his life in the same area where his body was eventually placed in the bog.

Although only seven years old, the Kayhausen Boy had lived with a significant physical condition. Radiographic studies revealed a pronounced abnormality in the right hip joint where the head of the femur had been altered by a healed infection. This condition would have left the joint stiff and painful, restricting his mobility and likely affecting how he moved in daily life.

Additional evidence of repeated childhood stress was found in the form of Harris lines on the left tibia. These lines indicate interruptions in bone growth caused by periods of illness or malnutrition during early development. These findings suggest that the child experienced recurring periods of physical hardship in the years before his death.

Isotopic evidence, combined with the ecological context of the bog, indicates that he likely grew up in a wetland rich landscape typical of northwestern Germany in the Iron Age. The contents of his digestive tract provide further insight into his diet, including apples and the seeds of wild wetland plants such as dock knotweed.

== Final days and cause of death ==
The examination concluded that he had been stabbed three to four centimetres deep, three times in the neck and once on his left arm. It is thought that the wound on the boy's arm might have happened in an act of self-defence against his attacker.

A recent examination of the body shows that the weapon used to kill the child was a dagger with a four-centimetre blade. A possible reason for the boy's demise is that he had suffered from an infected socket at the top of his femur, and hence would not have been able to walk without assistance. Because of the high incidence of deformities among bog bodies, such as the Yde Girl, anthropologists have suggested that the disabled were sacrificed because they were considered to be disfavoured by their gods. The boy's body is preserved in a formalin solution and is not displayed.

== See also ==
- List of bog bodies from Germany
