= Alfred Dieck =

German archaeologist and bog body scientist

- Born: 4 April 1906; Bad Salzelmen, Schönebeck, German Empire
- Died: 7 January 1989 (aged 82); Bremen, West Germany
- Education: Martin-Luther-University of Halle-Wittenberg
- Occupation: Archaeologist

Alfred Dieck (4 April 1906 – 7 January 1989) was a German archaeologist internationally recognised for the scientific studies on bog bodies and bog finds. Since the early 1990s, the results of his scientific work have been critically reviewed and found to be wrong in major parts.

== Biography ==
Alfred Dieck was born in Bad Salzelmen, a suburb of Schönebeck near the Elberiver. After he graduated from school, he studied theology and, in 1934, he changed to prehistory and anthropology and ethnography at the Martin-Luther-University of Halle-Wittenberg, where he finished with the degree of a doctor in 1939. During World War II, he was injured and returned from American imprisonment as an invalid. Both his thesis and most of his scientific records were lost during the war. For several years, he was unemployed, living in the region Bad Reichenhall and Salzburg, being the voluntary director of the International Turf Museum at Bad Wimsbach-Neydharting in Austria. Later, he was employed by the German state of Lower-Saxony.

For more than 50 years, Alfred Dieck worked on his archaeological bog body finds and ethnographic studies. He collected records about bog finds from archives, museums, and personal conversations with people who found bog finds and their relatives. He also collected specimens and samples of hairs and clothing from European bog bodies and published more than 180 articles about ethnographic studies, bog bodies, and bog finds. For many years, he had been internationally recognised as one of the most reputable scientists in this field.

Dieck has put a new view of sight on the interpretation of bog body finds not only being a small regional and cultural phenomena. It has been believed that bog bodies are a phenomenon of Northern Europe (Ireland, the British Islands, Denmark, Northern Germany, and the Netherlands) only and that most of the finds are dating to the Iron Age period only some hundred years BC and AD. Dieck clearly stated that the earliest bog body finds dated to the Mesolithic period and the youngest to World War II. He also stated that there are also finds known from Norway, Sweden, southern Germany and many other regions as well.

Alfred Dieck died in Bremen in 1989.

== Criticism ==
Alfred Dieck's conclusions have been criticised by other archaeologists. Dieck published many findings without referencing to proper sources. During his research, he raised the number of bog body finds from 120 in 1939 to 160 in 1951, 500 in 1968, 700 in 1972 and, finally, 1,850 bog bodies in his last summary in the year 1986. Over a period of more than 50 years, Dieck published a variety of special articles about stomach and colon investigations, individuals being tattooed, scalped, or being circumcised. But Dieck never performed the investigations on the human remains himself. He collected his information from archives, literature, and visits to museums, and from conversations with the finders and the finders' relatives. In his later years, Dieck appeared to collect information without questioning the reliability. He also cited many sources as …personally told by… or …lost during the war. First, the German prehistorian Klaus Raddatz questioned some archaeological finds published by Dieck in 1981. But still Dieck's work was accepted for many years. For their Master thesis at the University of Hamburg, Sabine Eisenbeiß and Katharina von Haugwitz compared Alfred Dieck's personal archives with reliable sources for finds in Lower-Saxony and Schleswig-Holstein. They concluded that only a small percentage of Dieck's finds could be confirmed by reliable sources, for example only 70 out of 655 bog body finds from Schleswig-Holstein. Wijnand van der Sanden checked Dieck's reports of Dutch finds and reached the same result.

Eisenbeiß and van der Sanden concluded that Dieck fabricated the findings in his publications.

== Literature ==
- van der Sanden, Wijnand; Eisenbeiß, Sabine (2006). "Imaginary people - Alfred Dieck and the bog bodies of northwest Europe". Archäologisches Korrespondenzblatt. 36: 111–122. ISSN 0342-734X.
- Eisenbeiß, Sabine (2003). Bauerochse, Andreas (ed.). Bog-bodies in Lower Saxony - rumours and facts: an analysis of Alfred Dieck's sources of information. Peatlands: archaeological sites, archives of nature, nature conservation, wise use; proceedings of the Peatland Conference 2002 in Hannover, Germany. Rhaden/Westf.: Leidorf. pp. 143–150. ISBN 3-89646-026-9.
- Schröder, Ekkehard (1986). "Die Arbeitsgemeinschaft Ethnomedizin grüsst Alfred Dieck zum 80. Geburtstag" (PDF). Curare (in German). 9/1: 3–4. Archived from the original (PDF) on 2011-07-23. (Necrolog)
