= Karl Schlabow =

German archaeologist and conservator (1891–1984)

- Born: April 27, 1891; Neumünster, Germany
- Died: September 30, 1984 (aged 93)
- Occupations: Archaeologist, Museum Director, Conservator
- Employer(s): Neumünster Textile Museum; Schleswig-Holstein State Archaeological Museum
- Organizations: Ahnenerbe
- Known for: Restoration of bog bodies and prehistoric textiles
- Notable work: Textilfunde der Eisenzeit in Norddeutschland (1976)
- Awards: Honorary Doctorate (University of Kiel, 1951); Caspar von Saldern Medal (City of Neumünster, 1977)

Karl Schlabow (27 April 1891 – 30 September 1984) was a German archaeologist, museum director and conservator with specialisations in textiles and in restoration of bog bodies. He founded the Neumünster Textile Museum. Since his death, his restorations have been called into question as overly aggressive.

== Life and career ==
Born in Neumünster, Schlabow studied painting at the Munich Academy of Fine Arts, then spent two years in Peru. On his return in 1926, on the recommendation of the textile manufacturer Ludwig Simons, he became director of the Neumünster city museum, which he developed into a textile museum. On the advice of Otto Lehmann of the museum at Altona, Schlabow made an intensive study of the history of textiles and textile handcrafts, and in 1928 he was commissioned by Gustav Schwantes of the Kiel Museum of Prehistory to catalogue and arrange that museum's textile holdings, which dated to the Bronze Age and Iron Age and came from archaeological investigations of peat bogs and burial mounds. Several thousand years old, poorly preserved and extremely delicate, the finds were unattractive in appearance and unsuited to exhibition. With the assistance of a long-time assistant, Willi Schramm, and others, Schlabow restored them, including recreating missing sections as accurately as possible. A travelling exhibit of the pieces toured museums in Bremen, Hamburg and Berlin for over three years with great success, and then became an important part of the permanent exhibition at the Neumünster Textile Museum.

Schlabow was also a close associate of Herbert Jankuhn, the SS officer who directed the Museum of Fatherland Antiquities at Kiel, forerunner of the Schleswig-Holstein State Archaeological Museum at Gottorf Castle. As a member of the Nazi pseudoscientific Ahnenerbe, he was sent in 1941 during the German occupation of France to Bayeux as a member of a research team to study Germany's "ancestral heritage" that examined the Bayeux Tapestry, and stole two small unembroidered pieces of it; they were found in German state archives in 2026 and returned to France

After World War II was interned until 1947. He then returned to the Neumünster museum and rebuilt the severely damaged building and collection. While continuing with this task, in 1948 he moved from there to Schleswig, where he was involved in developing the state archaeological museum and participated in the conservation of the bog finds from Thorsberg moor and Nydam Mose. He was responsible for the reconstruction of almost all the then known Iron Age textiles, conducted experiments including weaving two Prachtmäntel (ceremonial cloaks) on reconstructed period looms, and published numerous articles. He continued to work intensively in the field of Iron Age textile archaeology after his retirement, and in 1976 published Textilfunde der Eisenzeit in Norddeutschland, a book summing up his knowledge in the field. He is buried in the cemetery at Neumünster. His work included the reconstruction of Bronze Age clothing from mound burials in Denmark, including those of Egtved Girl, Skrydstrup Woman and the Borum Eshøj burials, and Iron Age clothing from bog finds in Germany and Denmark, including the Thorsberg Prachtmantel. He worked on the so-called building sacrifices from the Tofting dwelling hill, Peiting Woman, and some of the finds from the Nydam and Thorsberg bogs. He was a pioneer of textile archaeology, and together with the Danish archaeologist Margarete Hald, established it as a respected field. His publications remained standard works for decades.

== Honours ==
On his 60th birthday, 27 April 1951, Schlabow was awarded an honorary doctorate by the University of Kiel. On 1 June 1977 the city of Neumünster awarded him the Caspar von Saldern Medal for his services to the city and the museum.

== Controversy ==
Since a publication in 1978 by Michael Gebühr, also formerly of the Schleswig-Holstein State Archaeological Museum, there has been criticism of Schlabow's restorations, many of which seem to have paid more attention to artistic effect than to accuracy. For example, he added a probably unoriginal lower jaw to Osterby Man; manipulated Windeby Girl's hand to form an anachronistic obscene gesture, the fig sign, and altered drawings of the find site; and added a labia to the female of the Braak Bog Figures. He did not adequately investigate a baby's corpse found in Wilhelmshaven, which he wrongly explained as a human sacrifice. Gebühr suggests that he was "perhaps ... in fact only imaginative and at the same time out of his depth scientifically".

== Selected publications ==
- "'Rough justice' of 2000 years ago: an executed girl preserved in peat". Illustrated London News, 19 December 1953, p. 1015.
- Der Thorsberger Prachtmantel: Schlüssel zum altgermanischen Webstuhl. Förderverein Textilmuseum Neumünster, Veröffentlichungen. Neumünster: Wachholtz, 1965. OCLC 8609799 (in German)
- Textilfunde der Eisenzeit in Norddeutschland. Göttinger Schriften zur Vor- und Frühgeschichte 15. Neumünster: Wachholtz, 1976. ISBN 9783529015151 (in German)
