= Silkeborg Museum =

Museum in Denmark

Coordinates: 56.1690°N 9.5531°E

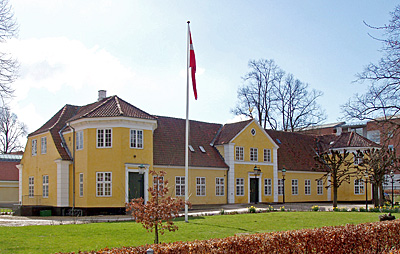
Museum Silkeborg

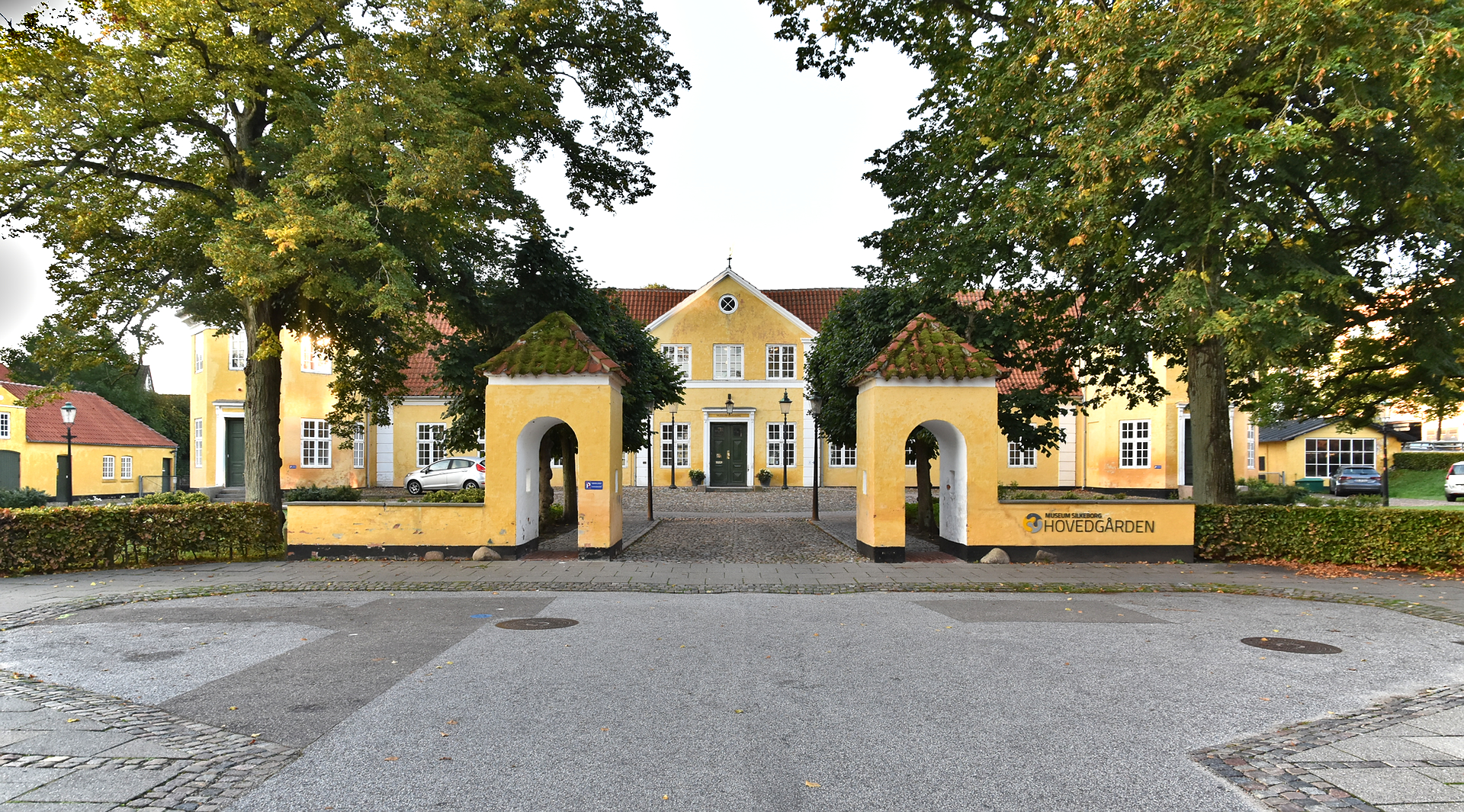
Hovedgården entrance

Silkeborg Museum is a museum of Danish cultural history with official state recognition based in Silkeborg Municipality, Denmark. Museum Silkeborg is located at three different sites: Manor House (Hovedgården) and the Paper Mill Museum (Papirmuseet) in Silkeborg and Blicheregnen farm in the village of Thorning.

== Hovedgården ==
Silkeborg Hovedgård houses the main administration of the museum. Silkeborg Hovedgård was built between 1767 and 1770 by Rittmeister Hans Nicolai Hoff after he had acquired Silkeborg Castle, whose buildings had fallen into despair. From 1846, a room in the building was used as a chapel for workers at the new Silkeborg Paper Factory and later the building was used as a post office.

The museum was founded in 1904. Silkeborg Hovedgård came back into private ownership in 1906 before it was acquired by Silkeborg Municipality in 1939. Exhibitions cover the Stone Age, the Bronze Age, the Iron Age and the Viking Age. Silkeborg Hovedgård is also home to the Tollund Man, one of the most well-preserved naturally mummified Pre-Roman Iron Age bog bodies found in Denmark.

== Papirmuseet ==
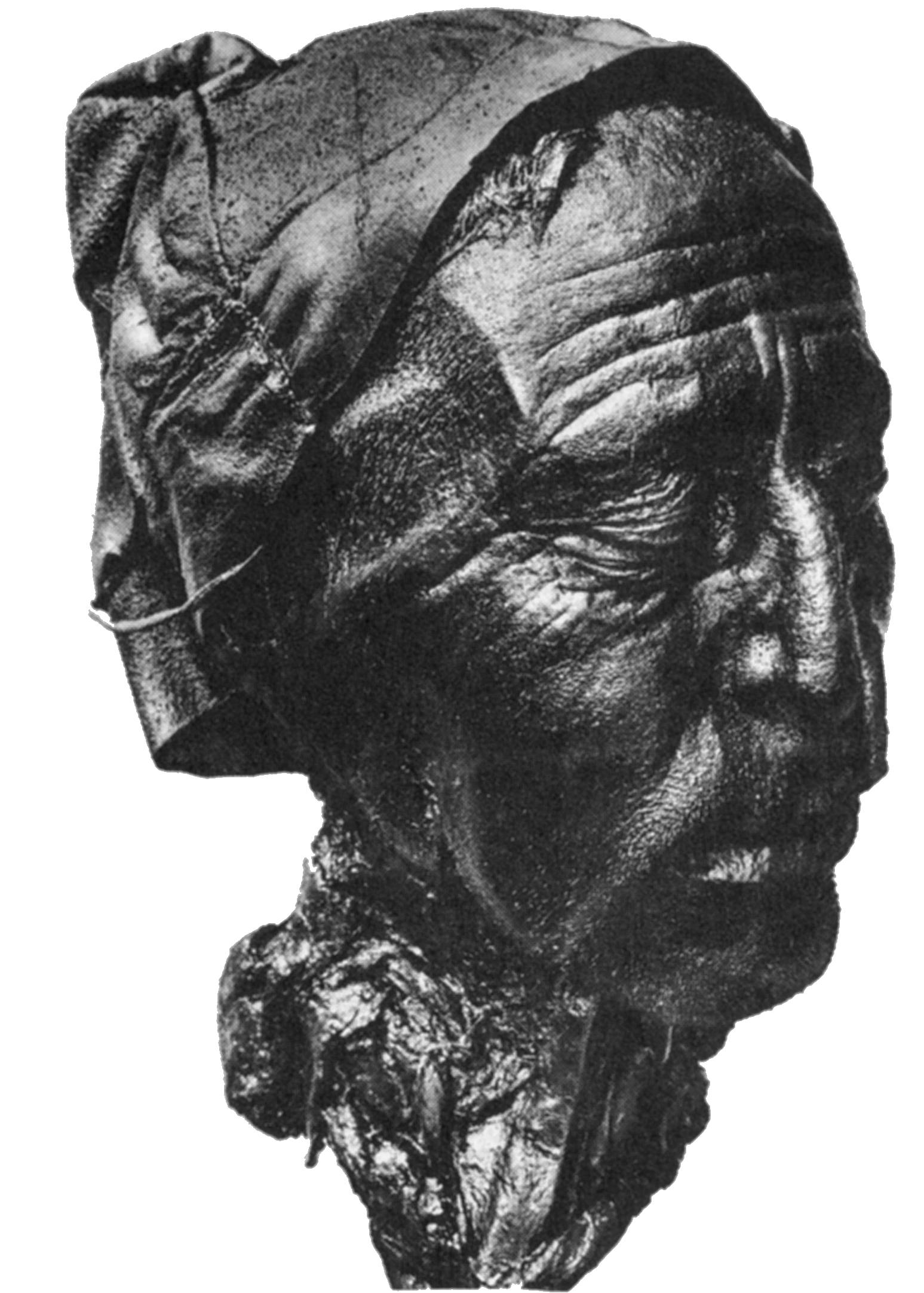
Tollund Man

The Paper Mill was founded in 1844-1845 and is inseparable from the beginning of Silkeborg. Until 1992, the Paper Mill manufactured paper for money bills.

== Blicheregnen ==
At Blicheregnen, the permanent exhibitions tell about noted poet and parson Steen Steensen Blicher (1782–1848) and about country life in general during the 19th century. Blicher grew up in the parish next to the museum, and he was parson in Thorning from 1819 to 1825 where he wrote one of his most famous novels. Throughout the year there are different special exhibitions at the museum. The museum also tells the story about the end of the civil war in the 12th century, which took place nearby the museum at the Battle of Grathe Heath (Slaget på Grathe Hede) where one of the Danish kings was killed.

== See also ==
- Museum Jorn, Silkeborg
