= Haraldskær Woman =

Iron age bog body from Denmark

Coordinates: 55°42′10″N 9°26′22″E

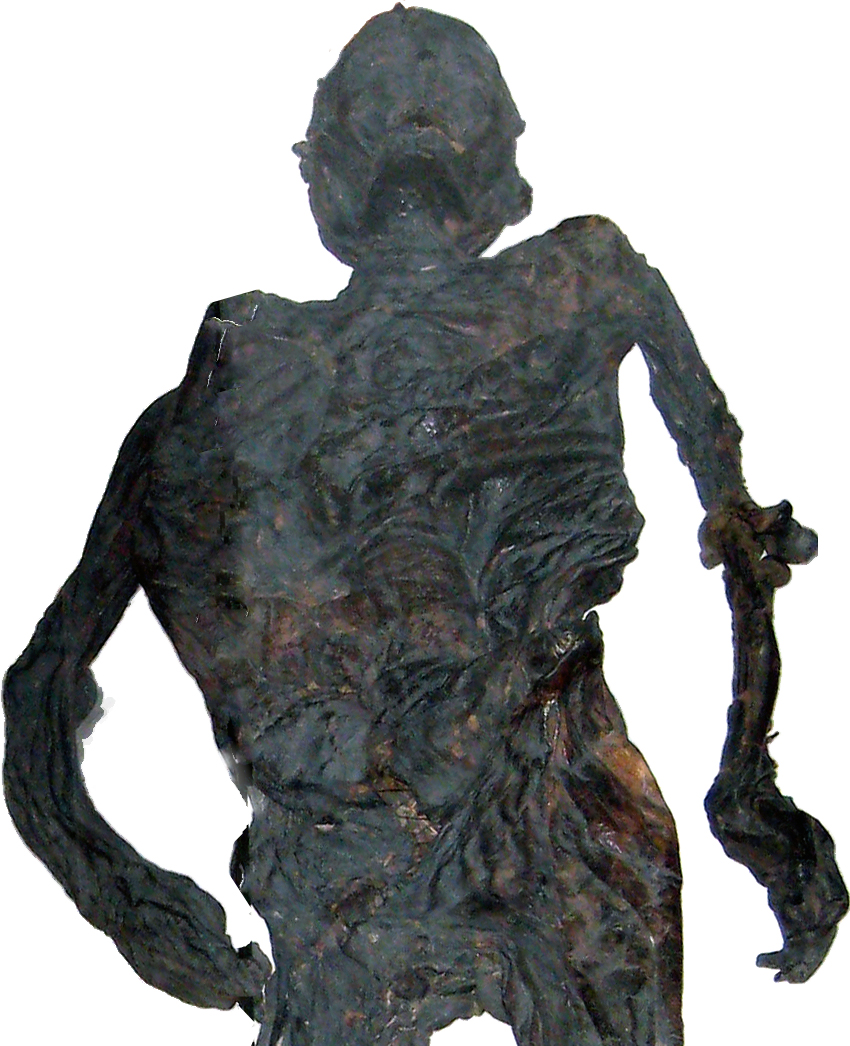
- The body of the Haraldskær Woman
- Born: Unknown
- Died: c. 490 BC; Haraldskær bog, Jutland, Denmark
- Resting place: Cultural Museum, Vejle, Denmark
- Known for: Exceptionally preserved Iron Age bog body

The Haraldskær Woman (or Haraldskjaer Woman), previously known as Queen Gunnhild (Danish: Dronning Gunhild), is a bog body of a woman preserved in a bog in Jutland, Denmark, and dating from about 490 BC (pre-Roman Iron Age). Workers found the body in 1835 while excavating peat on the Haraldskær Estate. The anaerobic conditions and acids of the peat bog contributed to the body's excellent preservation. Not only was the intact skeleton found, but so were the skin and internal organs. Scientists settled disputes about the age and identity of this well-preserved body in 1977, when radiocarbon dating determined conclusively that the woman's death occurred around the 5th century BC.

The Haraldskær Woman's body is on permanent display in a glass-covered sarcophagus inside The Cultural Museum in central Vejle, Denmark.

== Discovery ==
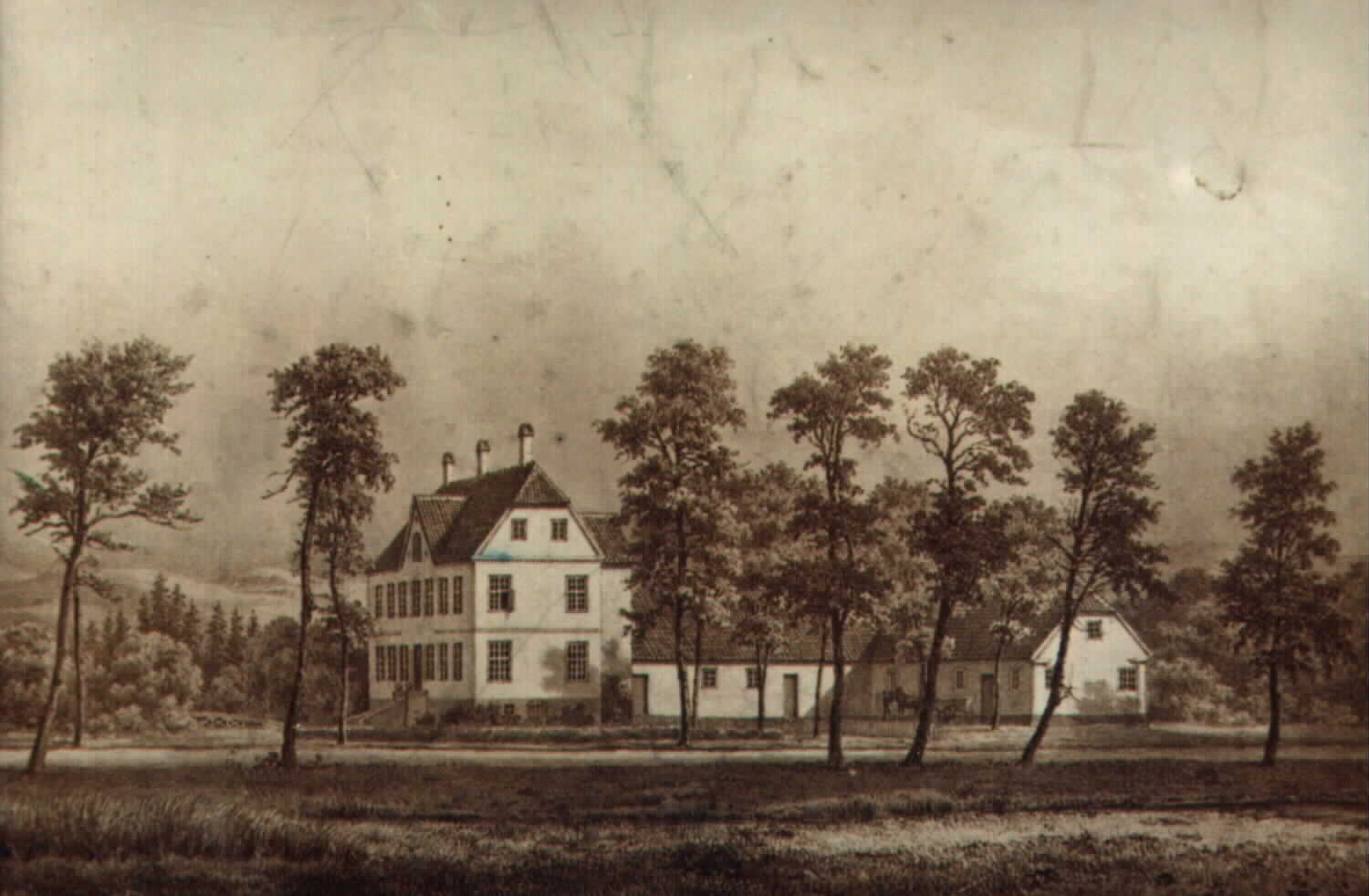
Haraldskær Estate in 1857

The Haraldskær Woman was discovered in 1835 by peat workers while excavating peat on the Haraldskær Estate near the town of Vejle, in eastern Jutland, Denmark.

They found her lying on her back in the bog, with a leather cape and three woollen garments carefully placed over her body. Woven branch hurdles and wooden poles had been laid across her remains, pinning her body to the bottom of the bog.

== Condition and physical description ==
The Haraldskær Woman was exceptionally well preserved by the acidic, oxygen-poor environment of the peat bog. When she was discovered in 1835, her complete skin envelope, skeleton, and internal organs remained intact, while all of her body joints were preserved beneath the overlying skin. Her remarkable state of preservation gave the impression that she had died only recently. The acidic peat naturally tanned her soft tissues, turning her skin a deep bronze colour while retaining a robust skin tone.

At the time of her discovery, her long hair, measuring more than 50 cm (20 in), and several of her teeth were preserved. Soon after her discovery, doctors estimated that the Haraldskær Woman had been about 50 years old when she died. They concluded that she had been in good health and found no signs of degenerative diseases such as arthritis, which are commonly present in the remains of people of comparable age.

More than 140 years after her discovery, in 1979, doctors at Århus Hospital carried out a further forensic examination of the Haraldskær Woman. By that time, the body had desiccated and shrunk, and the skin had become leathery, severely wrinkled, and folded. A CT scan of the cranium produced a revised age estimate of about 40 years at the time of death. By 1979, the body measured only 133 centimetres (4 ft 4 in). Using descriptions recorded when she was discovered in 1835, doctors estimated that she had originally stood about 150 centimetres (4 ft 11 in) tall.

== Identity ==
After the discovery of the body, early theories of her identity centred on the persona of Queen Gunnhild of Norway, who lived around 900–1000 CE. Most of the bog bodies recovered indicate the victim died from a violent murder or ritualistic sacrifice. These theories are consistent with the body being put into a bog as opposed to burial in dry earth.

According to the Jomsvikinga Saga, Harald Bluetooth of Denmark ordered Queen Gunnhild be drowned in a bog. Based upon the belief of her royal personage, King Frederick VI of Denmark-Norway commanded an elaborately carved sarcophagus to hold her body.

This careful treatment of the Haraldskær Woman's remains explains the excellent state of conservation of the corpse; conversely, Tollund Man, a later discovery, was not properly conserved and most of the body has been lost, leaving only the head as original remains in his display.

In 1842, the young Danish archaeologist J. J. A. Worsaae disputed the identification of the Haraldskær Woman with Gunnhild. A pioneer in archaeological stratigraphy, Worsaae presented evidence the Haraldskær Woman dated from the Iron Age. Later radiocarbon dating confirmed the body was not Gunnhild, but rather a woman of the early Iron Age who lived about 490 BCE.

== Cause of death ==
In 2000, Lone Hvass of the Elsinore Museum, Miranda Aldhouse-Green of Cardiff University, and the Department of Forensic Science at the University of Århus performed a re-examination of the Haraldskær Woman. Forensic analysis revealed stomach contents of unhusked millet and blackberries. Her neck had a faint groove as if someone applied a rope for torture or strangulation. The scientists concluded bog acids caused the swelling of the knee joint and that the woman was probably already dead before the branches pinned her down.

Because of her careful placement, and since cremation was the prevailing mode of interment during that period in Jutland, the examiners guess the Haraldskær Woman was a victim of ritual sacrifice.

== Public access ==
The Haraldskær Woman's body is on permanent display in a glass-covered sarcophagus inside The Cultural Museum in central Vejle, Denmark.

== Relation to other bog bodies ==
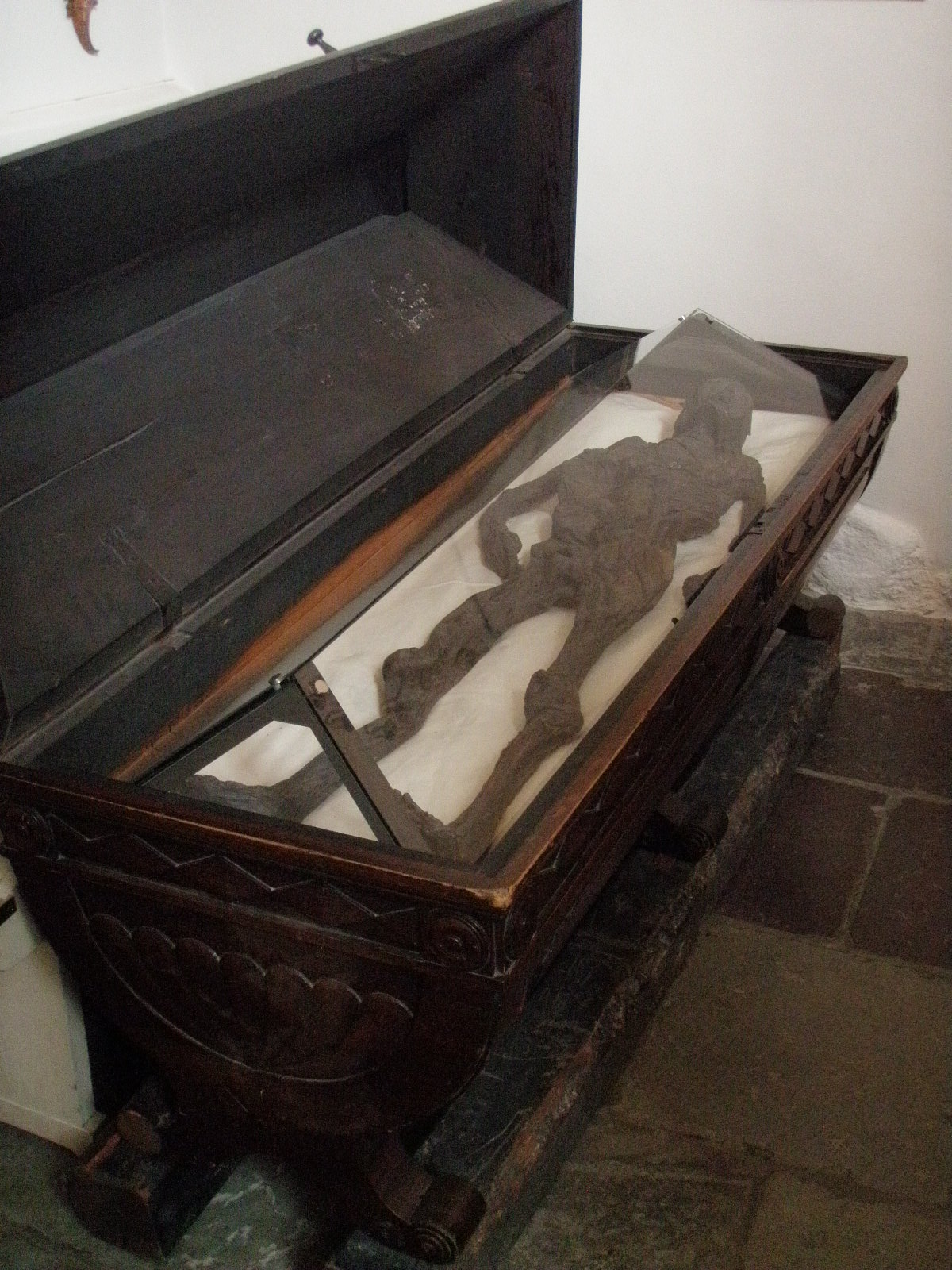
Haraldskær Woman on display in a glass-covered sarcophagus in Vejle, Denmark

The principal locations where bog bodies have been discovered are the Northern European countries of Germany, the Netherlands, the United Kingdom, Ireland, and especially Denmark. The oldest of these bodies dates to about 8000 BC, although the majority of specimens in Denmark are from the Pre-Roman Iron Age to Roman Iron Age era (about 500 BC to AD 400).

As of 2006, more than 700 ancient bodies have been discovered in these sites, although other estimates have placed the number in the thousands. It is difficult for scientists to ascertain a precise number because many of the bodies have been lost or destroyed.

Before archaeologists began actively searching for bog bodies, the bodies were discovered mostly during the routine extraction of peat, and then reburied or discarded. After the discovery that the systematic conservation of Iron Age bodies was attributable to the acidic anaerobic environs, major excavations have occurred in Jutland.

Other bog bodies recovered on the Jutland peninsula that have undergone as extensive an analysis as the Haraldskær Woman include Tollund Man, Grauballe Man, Elling Woman, Huldremose Woman and the Borremose Woman.

== Literary references ==
Danish author Steen Steensen Blicher, an amateur archaeologist and one of the first to visit the site, made the first literary reference to the Haraldskær Woman. In 1836, he published his novella Gravhøjen which was a parody about a mistaken archaeological find. However, by 1841 Blicher seemed to have changed his mind about the Haraldskær Woman's identity when he wrote the poem Dronning Gunhild, a lament for the dead queen in the bog. In 1846, the Danish playwright Jens Christian Hostrup wrote his comedy, A Sparrow Doing a Crane Dance, (En Spurv i Tranedans), in which the ghost of Queen Gunnhild gives a magical ring to a scheming tailor and makes everyone blind to his actions. Hostrup's play indirectly satirized the theory that the Haraldskær Woman was Queen Gunnhild, and became the first major public endorsement of Worsaae's hypothesis.

== See also ==
- List of bog bodies
- Borremose bodies
- Clonycavan Man
- Grauballe Man
- Lindow Man
- Lindow Woman
- Old Croghan Man
- Tollund Man
- Weerdinge Men
- Windeby I
- Yde Girl
