= Growth arrest lines =

- Other names: Harris lines
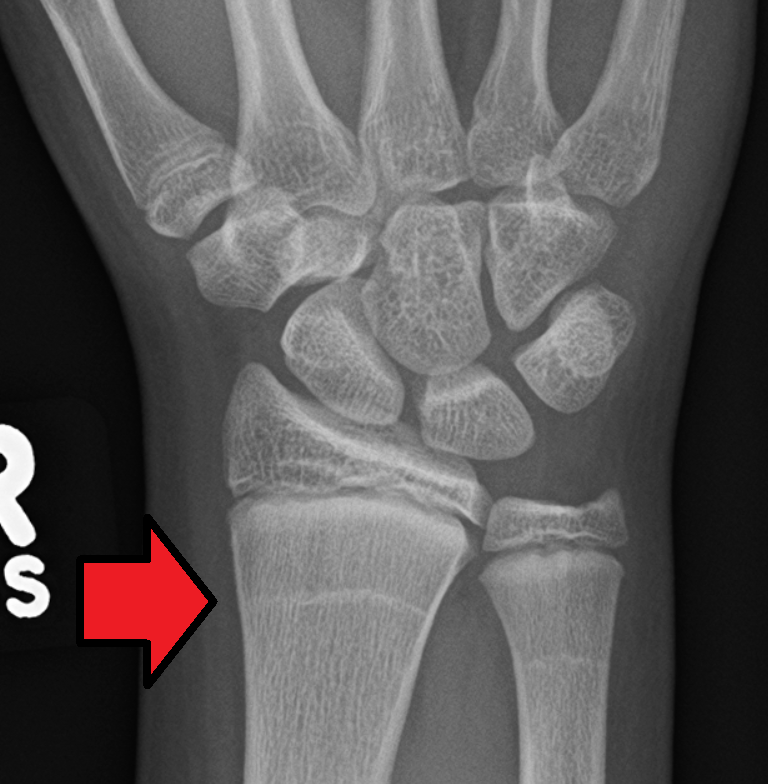
- Growth arrest lines in a child with an underlying bone disease
- Specialty: Orthopedics, radiology

Growth arrest lines, also known as Harris lines, are lines of increased bone density that represent the position of the growth plate at the time of insult to the organism and formed on long bones due to growth arrest. They are only visible by radiograph or in cross-section. The age at which the lines were formed can be estimated from a radiograph. Harris lines are often discussed as a result of juvenile malnutrition, disease or trauma. Other studies suggest a reconsideration of Harris lines as more of a result of normal growth and growth spurts, rather than a pure outcome of nutritional or pathologic stress. The lines are named after Henry Albert Harris (1886–1968), professor of anatomy at the University of Cambridge.

Particularly, deficiencies in protein and vitamins, which lead to delayed longitudinal bone growth, can result in the formation of Harris lines. During the process of endochondral bone growth, the cessation of osteoblastic activity results in the deposition of a thin layer of bone beneath the cartilage cap, potentially forming Harris lines. Subsequent recovery, necessary for the restoration of osteoblastic activity, is also implicated in Harris line formation. When matured cartilage cells reactivate, bone growth resumes, causing a thickening of the bony stratum. Therefore, complete recovery from periods of chronic illness or malnutrition also manifests as transverse lines on radiographs. Lines tend to be thicker with prolonged and severe malnutrition. Harris line formation typically peaks in long bones around 2–3 years after birth and becomes rare until adulthood after the age of 5. Additionally, Harris lines occur more frequently in boys than in girls.
