= Elling Woman =

Iron Age bog body found in Denmark

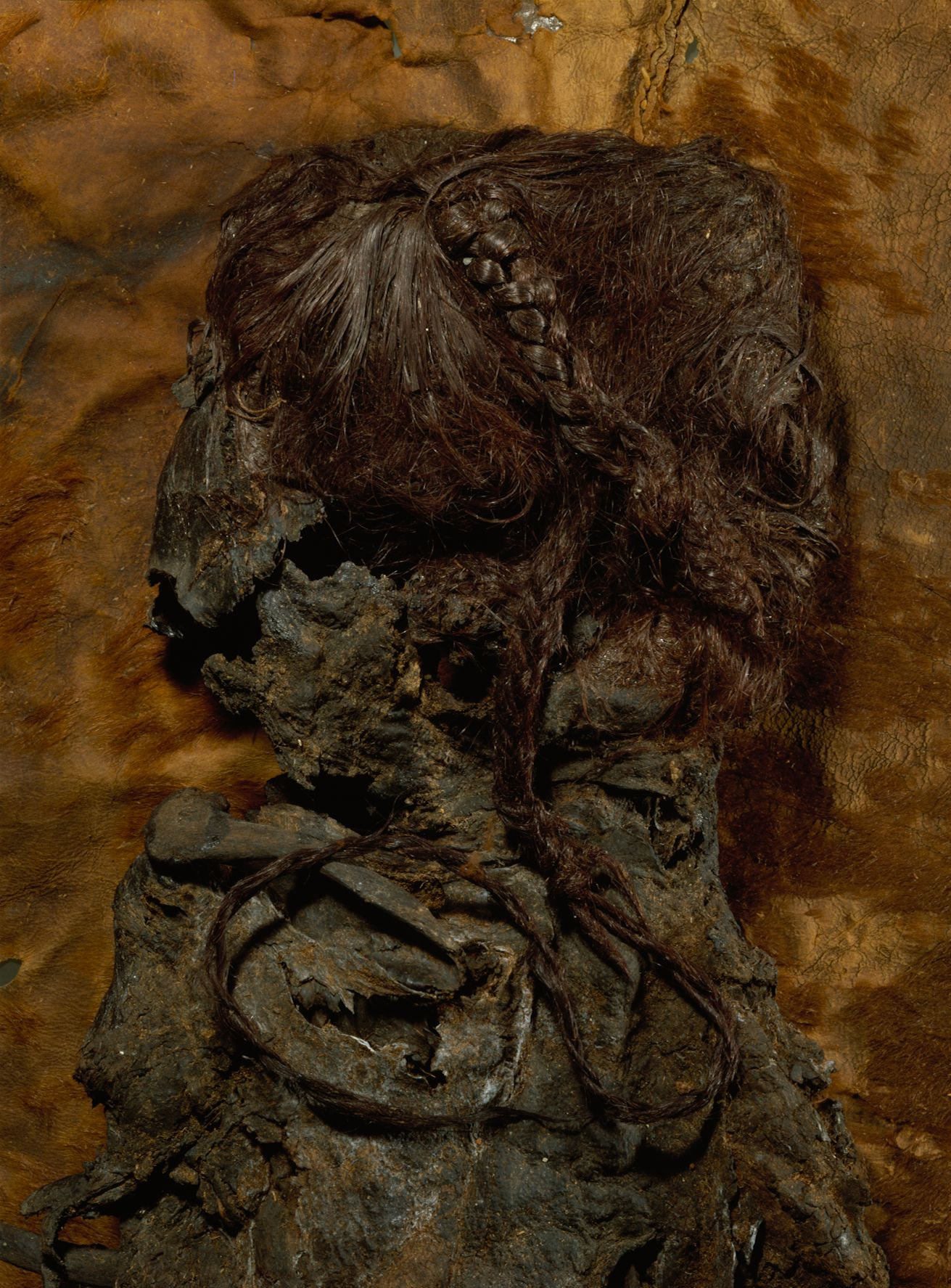
- Upper body of the Elling Woman
- Died: 355–205 BCE (aged approximately 25–35)
- Cause of death: Hanging or strangulation
- Body discovered: 1938; Bjældskovdal, near Silkeborg, Denmark
- Resting place: Museum Silkeborg, Denmark
- Known for: Exceptionally preserved, elaborate braided hairstyle; evidence of hanging; discovery near Tollund Man

The Elling Woman (Danish: Ellingpigen) is a bog body of a woman who died during the Pre-Roman Iron Age and whose remains were discovered in 1938 in the Bjældskovdal bog, west of Silkeborg in central Jutland, Denmark. Radiocarbon dating places her death around 355-205 BCE and examination of the remains indicates that she was approximately 25-35 years old when she died.

The Elling Woman was found wrapped in a sheepskin cape, with a separate animal hide tied around her legs and a leather thong around her neck. Her approximately 90 cm (35 in)-long hair was exceptionally well preserved and retained an elaborate braided hairstyle. Marks on her neck and the surviving leather thong indicate that she died by hanging or strangulation.

Initially identified as male, the body was recognized as female after radiographic examinations in 1976 and 1978. The Tollund Man, another Iron Age bog body who also died by hanging, was discovered in 1950 approximately 60 m (200 ft) from where the Elling Woman had been found.

== Discovery ==
The individual who became known as the Elling Woman was discovered in 1938 by local farmer Jens Zakariassen while cutting peat in the Bjældskovdal bog, west of Silkeborg in central Jutland, Denmark. Initially believing that the remains were those of a drowned animal, he continued digging until it became clear that he had uncovered human remains.

The body lay approximately 1.05 m (3.4 ft) below the surface of the bog in what archaeologists later identified as an earlier peat cutting. The discovery was reported to the National Museum of Denmark, where curator H. C. Broholm directed the excavation and recovery of the body for further examination.

== Condition ==
The Elling Woman is preserved as a dark, leathery body typical of individuals recovered from peat bogs, where low oxygen, cool temperatures, and the acidic water produced by sphagnum slow decay and tan the skin in a manner similar to leather. When she was removed in a block in 1938, her soft tissues were still flexible and her limbs retained much of their shape. Her long hair, measuring approximately 90 cm (35 in), survived in exceptional condition and continued to hold the form of the elaborate braid she wore at the time of death.

Her face was already poorly preserved when discovered, and none of her internal organs had survived. Bog environments dissolve soft tissues and the mineral content of bone while stabilizing collagen in skin and hair, creating the selective pattern of preservation seen in many bog bodies. This chemical process explains why the outer surfaces of her body and her clothing survived while most internal structures did not.

Her condition changed significantly after excavation. Long term conservation methods for peat-preserved human remains were not yet established in the 1930s, and the body gradually dried once removed from the bog. By the time of detailed examinations at the Silkeborg Museum in the 1970s, the skin had tightened and hardened, producing deeper folds along the limbs and torso. Although the body had become more rigid, the overall outline and many surface details remained intact enough for forensic study.

Several features remain exceptionally well preserved. The ligature marks on her neck are sharply defined and match the leather thong recovered with the body, supporting the conclusion that she died by hanging or strangulation. The skin of her limbs and back retains fine surface texture, including visible hair follicles. The sheepskin cape and leather bindings found with her preserve stitching, seams, and reinforced edges, offering insight into Iron Age textile and hide working techniques that closely parallel those seen on the Tollund Man, discovered approximately 60 m (200 ft) from the site.

== Clothing and associated items ==
When the Elling Woman was discovered in 1938, she was wrapped in a short cape made from sheepskin. A separate animal hide had been tied around her legs, and a narrow leather thong remained around her neck.

== Hair ==
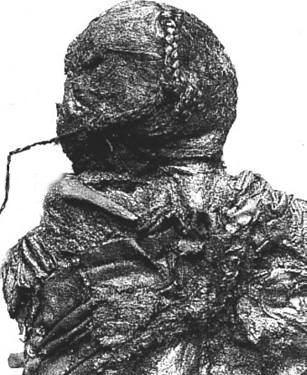
Elling Woman's preserved hair, showing the long plait and its arrangement at the back of her head

Elling Woman's hair was exceptionally well preserved and retained the elaborate hairstyle in which it had been arranged before her death in the Pre-Roman Iron Age, more than 2,000 years ago. Her hair was approximately 90 cm (35 in) long.

The hairstyle was considerably more complex than a single braid. Most of the hair was combed backwards over the head and formed into a three-strand plait, while the hair at the nape was initially left free. At the nape, the remaining hair was incorporated and the hair was divided into seven separate sections. Each section was twisted before the seven were grouped in sets of two, two and three. These groups were then worked together to form a larger three-strand plait.

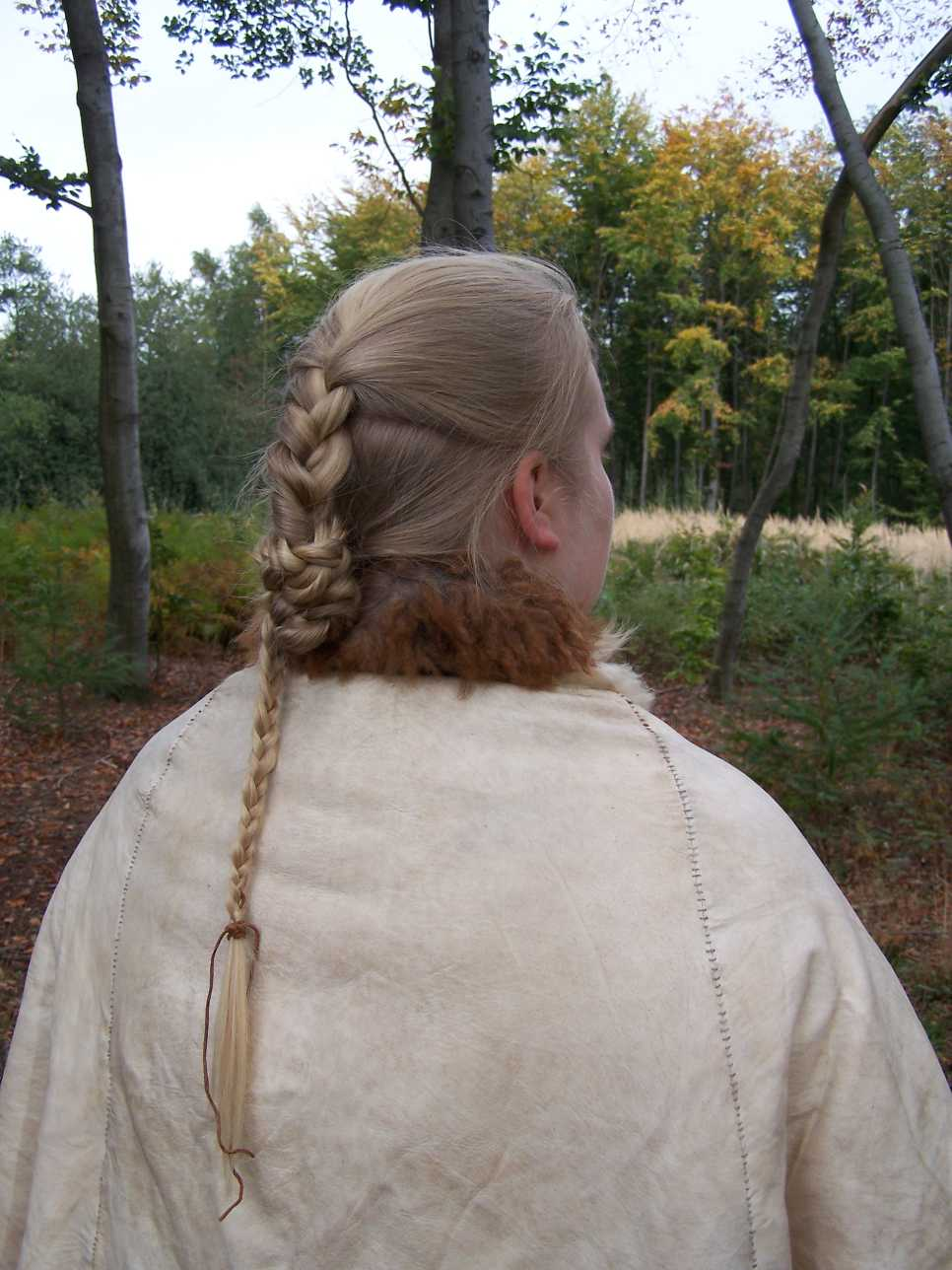
Reconstruction showing how Elling Woman's long hair was arranged at the back of her head

Rather than being left to hang down her back, the finished plait was wound twice around the braided hair above the nape of her neck, while the remaining end hung loose on her left side. The combination of twisting, grouping and plaiting remained sufficiently well preserved for researchers to determine how the hairstyle had been constructed. Archaeologist Melanie Giles describes Elling Woman's approximately 90 cm (35 in) hair as having been plaited from seven strands and then wound around her neck.

== Scientific study ==
=== Body and health ===
When the Elling Woman was re-examined in 1978, 40 years after her discovery, forensic specialist Markil Gregersen estimated that she was about 25 to 35 years old when she died. He based this estimate on several features of her skeleton, including her pelvis and whether her bones had finished growing. Radiologists Bent Langfeldt and Jørgen Raahede reached a similar age estimate from X-rays of her skeleton. The radiological examination also confirmed that she was female.

Radiographs taken in 1976 and 1978 allowed researchers to examine much of her surviving skeleton. They identified all seven vertebrae of the neck and nine vertebrae of the upper and middle back, as well as several ribs.

The radiographs showed that her bones had undergone extensive demineralization, or loss of bone mineral. This had initially been mistaken for osteoporosis. The later examination showed that the demineralization resulted from long-term exposure to acidic peat water after death rather than disease during her life. Researchers found no evidence of degenerative disease or other disease affecting the surviving bones.

Several areas of the skeleton initially appeared to be fractures. Langfeldt and Raahede concluded that these represented damage after death rather than injuries sustained during life, and attributed some of the damage to the excavation of the body in 1938. The examination found no evidence of skeletal injuries sustained during her life.

=== Sex identification ===
Following the body's discovery in 1938, it was initially identified as male. Archaeologist P. V. Glob repeated this identification in his 1965 book The Bog People.

Nearly 40 years after the discovery, the body was re-examined at the Silkeborg Museum. During examinations in 1976 and 1978, X-ray images of the pelvis showed that the individual was female, overturning the earlier identification. The body subsequently became known as the Elling Woman.

=== Dating ===
Radiocarbon dating places the Elling Woman between about 355 and 205 BCE, during the Pre-Roman Iron Age. Early testing of her preserved soft tissue produced a less precise date. She was later tested again using accelerator mass spectrometry, a newer form of radiocarbon dating that can work with much smaller samples. Although the later test produced a more precise measurement, changes in the amount of carbon in the atmosphere during this period mean that her date cannot be narrowed to a particular year.

== Cause of death ==
The Elling Woman is believed to have died by hanging during the Pre-Roman Iron Age. When her body was discovered in Bjældskovdal in 1938, a leather noose was recovered with her remains. Archaeologist Christian Fischer later suggested that the noose had been cut and moved from its original position by a peat-cutting spade during the discovery of the body.

Forty years later, in 1978, forensic specialist Markil Gregersen re-examined the Elling Woman. He found a deep groove around her neck that he interpreted as evidence that she had been hanged. Gregersen found no injuries to her skeleton that had occurred while she was alive and no other signs of violence.

During the same investigation, radiologists Bent Langfeldt and Jørgen Raahede examined her entire body using X-rays. Several of her bones appeared to be fractured, but they concluded that the damage had occurred after her death, particularly when her body was excavated in 1938.

Fischer later interpreted the Elling Woman's killing and the placement of her body in the bog as evidence of human sacrifice. The physical evidence indicates how she probably died, but the reason she was killed is unknown.

== Exhibition ==
The Elling Woman is on display at Museum Silkeborg in Silkeborg, Denmark. The remains were transferred from the National Museum of Denmark to Silkeborg Museum in the 1970s and placed in a dedicated display case in 1978. She is exhibited at the museum's Hovedgården site alongside Tollund Man, who was discovered in the same bog about 60 m (200 ft) from her find site.

== See also ==
- List of bog bodies
