= Yde (disambiguation) =

Yde is a town in the Netherlands. Yde or YDE may also refer to:

- Yde (name)
- Yde Girl, a bog body found in the town of Yde
- Yde et Olive, a thirteenth-century French song
- Yangum language, spoken in Papua New Guinea (by ISO 639 code)
- Paradise River Airport, Canada (by IATA code)
- Young Democrats for Europe
- Actress Breanna Yde, who releases music under the pseudonym YDE
