= Race and appearance of Jesus =

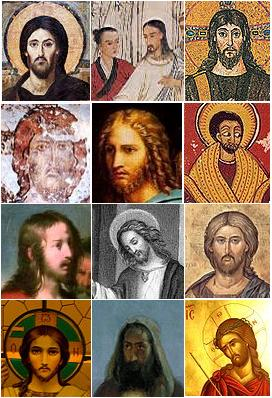
Jesus' ethnicity has been depicted in various ways by different cultures.

The race and appearance of Jesus, widely accepted by researchers to be a Jewish Galilean from Roman Judaea, has been a topic of discussion since the days of early Christianity. Various theories about the race of Jesus have been proposed and debated. By the Middle Ages, a number of documents, generally of unknown or questionable origin, had been composed and were circulating with details of the appearance of Jesus. These documents are now mostly considered forgeries.

A wide range of depictions have appeared over the two millennia since Jesus's death, often influenced by cultural settings, political circumstances and theological contexts. Many depictions are interpretations of spurious sources, and are generally historically inaccurate.

By the 19th century, theories that Jesus was non-Semitic were being developed, with writers suggesting he was variously white, black, or some race other than those known to have been native to the Levant. However, as in other cases of the assignment of race to biblical individuals, these claims have been mostly based on cultural stereotypes, ethnocentrism, and societal trends rather than on scientific analysis or historical method.

== Historical appearance ==
Research on ancient skeletal anthropology in the Southern Levant (modern-day Israel and Palestine) suggests that Judeans of the time were biologically closer to present-day Iraqi Jews than to any other modern population, according to bio-historian Yossi Nagar. Thus, in terms of physical appearance, the average Judean of the time would have likely had brown or black hair, honey/olive-brown skin, and brown eyes. Judean men of the time period were on average about 1.65 metres or 5 feet 5 inches in height. Scholars have also suggested that it is likely Jesus had short hair and a beard, in accordance with Jewish practices of the time and the appearance of philosophers. The earliest depictions of Jesus from the Roman catacombs depict him as free of facial hair.

Subsequent genetic analysis has shown Judeans were descendants of Canaanites, who shared strongest affinities with contemporary Levantine populations.

Historians have speculated that Jesus's ascetic and itinerant lifestyle and work as a tektōn (Ancient Greek for an artisan-craftsman, typically a carpenter), entailing manual labour and exposure to the elements, affected his appearance. It has been suggested that Jesus likely had a lean appearance, and would have looked akin to any other rural Galilean of his time.

== Biblical references ==
=== Old Testament ===
Old Testament references which Jews interpreted as being about a coming messiah have been used to form conjectures about the appearance of Jesus. One example is Isaiah 53:2 which refers to a scourged figure with "no beauty that we should desire him." This passage has been interpreted as Jesus' physical description.

=== New Testament ===
==== In the gospels ====
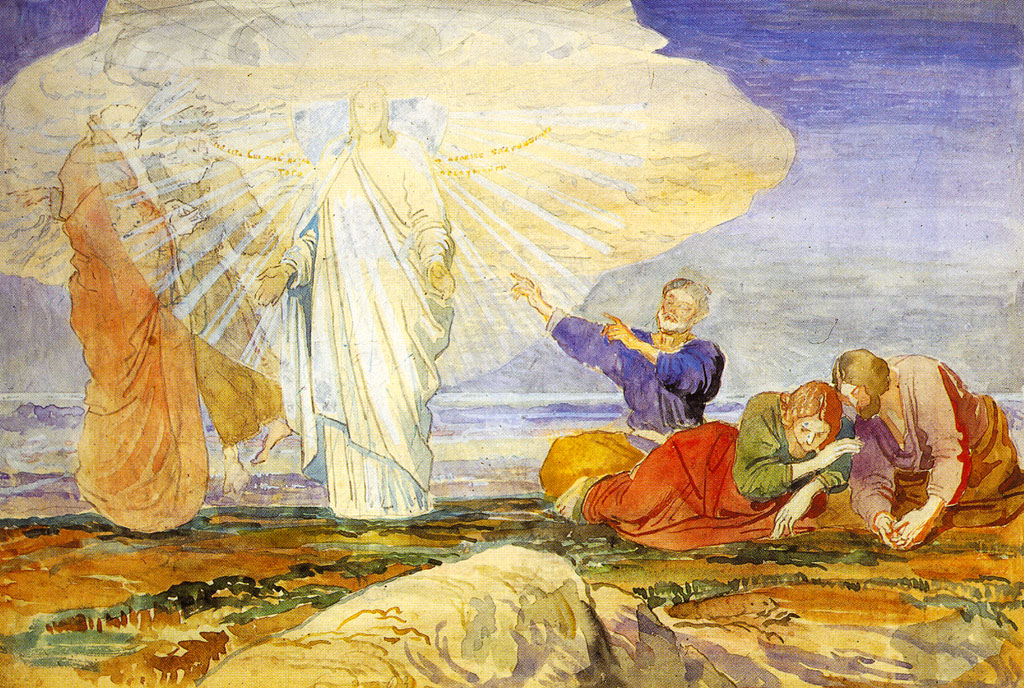
Transfiguration by Alexandr Ivanov, 1824

The New Testament includes no descriptions of Jesus's appearance before his death, and the gospel narratives are generally indifferent to people's racial appearance or features.

The synoptic gospels include the account of the transfiguration of Jesus, during which he was glorified with "His face shining as the sun", but this appearance is considered to refer to Jesus in majestic and transfigured form.

==== Book of Revelation ====
The Book of Revelation (Rev 1:14-15) includes John's vision of the Son of Man:

His head and his hairs were white like wool, as white as snow; and his eyes were as a flame of fire;

And his feet like unto fine brass, as if they burned in a furnace; and his voice as the sound of many waters.

And he had in his right hand seven stars: and out of his mouth went a sharp two-edged sword: and his countenance was as the sun shineth in his strength.

This vision is usually considered to refer to Jesus in heavenly form, not his appearance during his earthly life.

== Literary traditions ==
=== Early Church to the Middle Ages ===
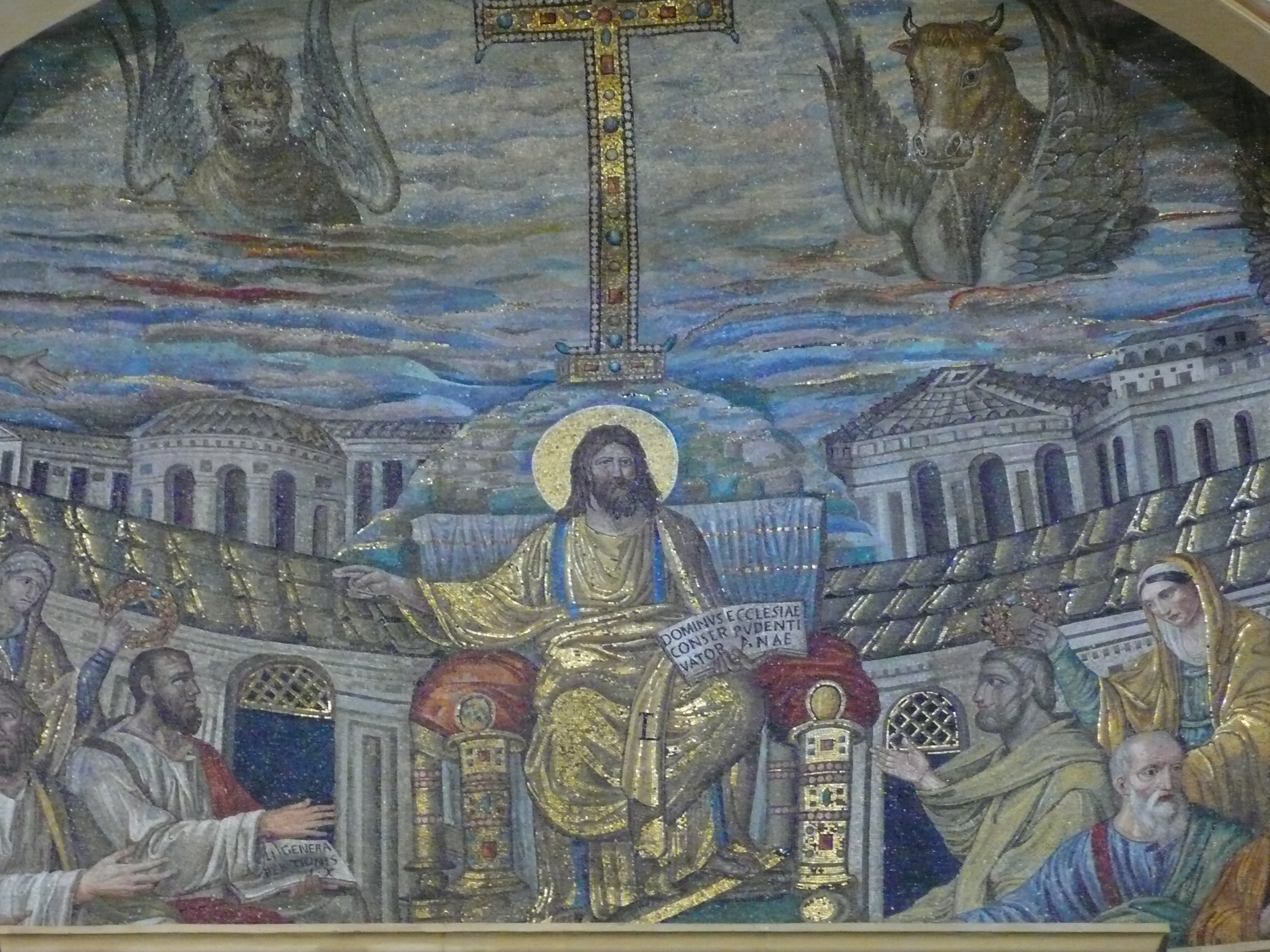
Christ Pantocrator in a Roman mosaic in the church of Santa Pudenziana, Rome, c. 400–410 AD during the Western Roman Empire

Despite the lack of direct biblical or historical references, from the 2nd century onward, various theories about the appearance of Jesus were advanced. However, these focused more on his physical appearance than on his specific race or ancestry. Larger arguments of this kind have been debated for centuries.

Justin Martyr argued for the genealogy of Jesus in the biological Davidic line from Mary, as well as from his non-biological father Joseph. However, this only implies a general Jewish ancestry, acknowledged generally by authors.

The focus of many early sources was on the alleged physical unattractiveness of Jesus rather than his beauty. The second-century anti-Christian philosopher Celsus wrote that Jesus was "ugly and small", and similar descriptions are presented in a number of other sources as discussed extensively by Robert Eisler, who in turn often quotes from Ernst von Dobschütz' monumental Christusbilder. Tertullian states that Jesus's outward form was despised, that he had an ignoble appearance, and the slander he suffered proved the 'abject condition' of his body. According to Irenaeus, he was a weak and inglorious man, and in the Acts of Peter, he is described as small and ugly to the ignorant. Andrew of Crete relates that Christ was bent or even crooked, and in the non-canonical Acts of John, he is described as bald-headed and small with no good looks.

As quoted by Eisler, both Hierosolymitanus and John of Damascus claim that "the Jew Josephus" described Jesus as having had connate eyebrows with goodly eyes and being long-faced, crooked and well-grown. In a letter to the Emperor Theophilus, attributed to John of Damascus in the eighth century, Jesus is described as having a "tall stature, arched eyebrows, beautiful eyes, long nose, wavy hair of pleasant colour, black beard, wheat-coloured face like that of His Mother" and "elongated fingers". Ephrem Syrus (320–379 AD) describes Jesus's height as 3 cubits (four foot six): "God took human form and appeared in the form of three human ells (cubits); he came down to us small of stature." Theodore of Mopsuestia likewise claimed that the appearance of Christ was smaller than that of the children of Jacob (Israel). In the apocryphal Lentulus letter, Jesus is described as having had a reddish complexion, matching Muslim traditions in this respect. Justin Martyr, Tertullian, and Ambrose considered lack of physical attractiveness in Jesus as fulfilling the messianic prophecy Suffering Servant narrative of Isaiah 53.

The more mainstream, theological perspective, as expressed by Church Fathers Jerome and Augustine of Hippo, argued that Jesus must have been ideally beautiful in face and body. For Augustine he was "beautiful as a child, beautiful on earth, beautiful in heaven". These theological arguments were further extended in the 13th century by Thomas Aquinas in his Summa Theologiae based on his analysis of the perfection of Christ, reasoning that Jesus must have embodied every possible human perfection.

By the Middle Ages, a number of documents, generally of unknown or questionable origin, had been composed and were circulating with details of the appearance of Jesus:

- Around the 9th century, Epiphanius Monachus referred to a tall angelic figure, which has at times been interpreted as Christ, but scholars consider it an unlikely reference to Jesus. Other spurious references include the Archko Volume (likely composed in the 19th century) and the Letter of Pilate to Tiberius, most likely composed in the Middle Ages.
- The Letter of Lentulus, a forged letter supposedly written by Publius Lentulus, the Governor of Judea, to the Roman Senate, according to most scholars was composed to compensate for the lack of any physical description of Jesus in the Bible. It offers a description of Jesus as being a "man in stature middling tall, and comely, having a reverend countenance, which they that look upon may love and fear."
- In the 14th century, Nicephorus Callistus quoted an unnamed antique source that described Jesus as tall and beautiful with fair, wavy hair, but his account was most likely without basis and was inspired by the prevailing artistic images of Jesus.

=== Quranic and Muslim traditions ===
Quranic and hadith traditions such as Sahih Bukhari as well as tafsir have given an oral depiction of what Jesus looked like, although some accounts do not match, such as his being both curly-haired and straight-haired. The hadith refer to Muhammad's account of the Night Journey, when he was taken up to heaven by the angel Gabriel (Jibra'il), where he saw Jesus and other prophets. Most versions of this say "Jesus had curly hair and a reddish complexion." Others say his face was flushed as if he just had a bath ("a reddish man with many freckles on his face as if he had just come from a bath").

In another account from Bukhari, Jesus is seen in a dream near the Kaaba, as "a man of a wheatish complexion with straight hair. I asked who it was. They said: This is the Messiah, son of Mary." However, other narrations give variations in the color. Salim ibn Abd-Allah reports from his father Abdullah ibn Umar that the prophet "did not say that Jesus was of red complexion", rather he was "a man of brown complexion and lank hair". In contrast, Abd Allah ibn Abbas says Jesus was of "moderate complexion inclined to the red and white colors and of lank hair".

According to Hanafi Madhab, contradictions in hadith may be resolved through multiple methods, one being the number of times a narration has been made and the number of chain of narrations and the character of those in the chain of narration or the narrator themselves. There are four hadiths in Bukhari stating Jesus had a brown complexion and three hadiths in Imam Muslim. However, the most prominent narrator is from Salim ibn Abdullah ibn Umar, descendant of Caliph Umar, with a chain of narration that stated: "a man of brown complexion and lank hair".

These variations have been explained in various ways, and have been co-opted to make assertions about race. For example, Ana Echevarría notes that medieval Spanish writer Jiménez de Rada, in his Historia arabum, chooses a version to emphasise that Jesus is whiter than Muhammad, quoting the Ibn Abbas version: "I saw Jesus, a man of medium height and moderate complexion inclined to the red and white colours and of lank hair." Echevarría comments that "Moses and Jesus are portrayed as specimens of a completely different 'ethnic type', fair and blond; 'ethnic' or 'racial' differences between them and Muhammad are thus highlighted."

=== Latter-Day Saint depictions ===
The Doctrine and Covenants describes the Lord appearing to Joseph Smith: "His eyes were as a flame of fire; the hair of his head was white like the pure snow; his countenance shone above the brightness of the sun; and his voice was as the sound of the rushing of great waters ..." (D&C: 110:3)

In keeping with the political climate of the 19th and 20th centuries, Latter-Day Saint founder Joseph Smith envisioned Jesus as white, as reflected in Latter-Day Saint texts and portrayals of Jesus. Mary, mother of Jesus is also described in First Nephi, a Latter-Day document, as "a virgin, and she was exceedingly fair and white" (1 Nephi 11:13). The early Latter-Day Saint church printed its first images of Jesus as a white man with blue eyes. According to Blum and Harvey, the blue eyes may have been intended to bolster Mormonism's image of whiteness and Americanness, distinguishing it from Protestant faiths.

== Academic research ==
=== Emergence of racial theories (19th-20th centuries) ===
In his book The Forging of Races, Colin Kidd argues that the assignment of race to biblical individuals has been a subjective practice which is mostly based on cultural stereotypes and societal trends rather than scientific methods. Kidd reviews a number of theories about the race of Jesus, including a white "Aryan" Jesus and a black African Jesus.

In his book Racializing Jesus, Shawn Kelley says that the assignment of a specific race to Jesus has been a cultural phenomenon which has been emanating from the higher levels of intellectual circles within societies, and he draws parallels between the different approaches within different settings. Cain Hope Felder has argued that New Testament passages such as Galatians 3:28 express a form of universalism which goes beyond race, ethnicity or religion.

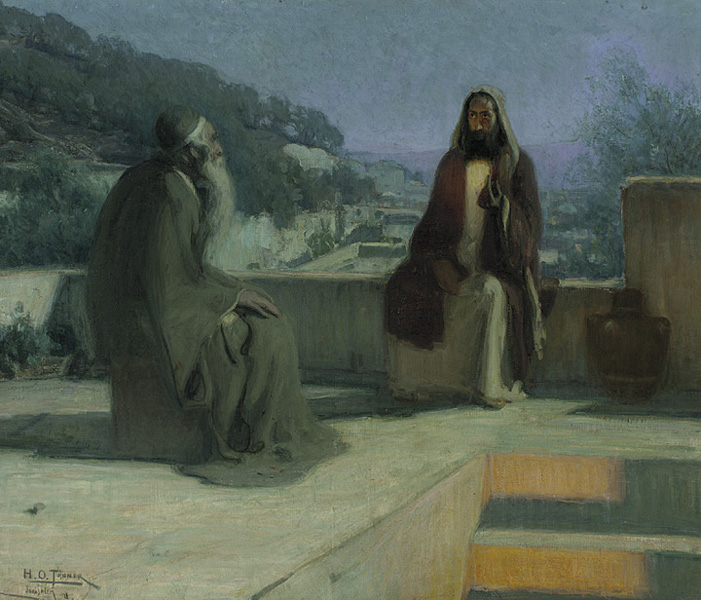
Jesus with Nicodemus. Painting by Tanner, 1899

By the 19th century, theories which were based on the belief that Jesus was a member of the so-called "Aryan race", and in particular, theories which were based on the belief that his appearance was Nordic, were developed and later, they appealed to advocates of the new racial antisemitism, who did not want to believe that Jesus was Jewish, Semitic or Western Asian. Houston Stewart Chamberlain posited that Jesus was of Amorite-Germanic extraction, although Amorites were themselves a Northwest Semitic people. Madison Grant claimed Jesus for the Nordic race. This theory found its most extreme form in the Nazi theology of Positive Christianity and the German Christians movement. Scholars who supported the radical Aryan view also argued that being a Jew by religion was distinguishable from being a Jew by race or ethnicity. These theories usually include the rationalization that Jesus was an Aryan because the region of Galilee was supposedly inhabited by non-Jews who spoke an unknown Indo-European language, but this theory has not gained scholarly acceptance – Galilee was inhabited by a significant non-Jewish minority, but its members spoke various local Semitic languages.

In his book Anacalypsis (1836), Godfrey Higgins suggested that Jesus was a dark, brown-skinned Indo-Aryan from North India. In 1906, a German writer named Theodor Plange wrote a book titled Christ-an Indian? in which he argued that Jesus was an Indian and the Christian gospel originated in India.

By the 20th century, theories which were based on the belief that Jesus was black had also been proposed, but proponents of them did not claim that he belonged to a specific African ethnicity, based on the unsupported argument that as a group, the Semitic ancient Israelites of Western Asia were originally black people, either in whole or in part. Martin Luther King Jr. was a proponent of the "Black Christ" movement and he identified the struggle of Jesus against the authorities of the time with the struggle of African Americans in the United States, as he questioned why the white church leaders did not voice concern for racial equality. For some, this blackness was due to Jesus's identification with black people, not to the color of his skin, while others such as the black nationalist Albert Cleage argued that Jesus was ethnically black.

=== Modern scholarship ===
A study which was documented in the 2001 BBC series Son of God attempted to determine what Jesus's race and appearance may have been. Assuming Jesus to be a native West Asian Galilean Semite, the study concluded in conjunction with Mark Goodacre that he would have appeared 'Middle Eastern' and his skin would have been "olive-coloured" and "swarthy" – these results were criticised by some media outlets for being "dismissive" and "dumbed down".

In academic studies, beyond generally agreeing that "Jesus was Jewish" and beyond generally agreeing that he was from Western Asia, there are no contemporary depictions of Jesus that can be used to determine his appearance. However, John Elliott argues that Jesus always identified himself as Israelite in the New Testament. Fellow people of Judaea identified him as Israelite, Galilean or Nazarene whilst outsiders identified him as Judean/Jewish, due to Hellenistic-Roman culture, which grouped all people in Judea as Judean.

In 2018 historian Joan Taylor published What Did Jesus Look Like? which traced portrayals of Jesus back through time from the European Jesus of western art to Jesus himself. By working with Yossi Nagar, an Israeli anthropologist who was able to prove that the physical characteristics of the bones of Jews which date back to the time of Jesus have similarities to the bones of contemporary Iraqi Jews, Taylor concluded that Jesus had honey/olive skin, brown eyes and brown or black hair. As for the honey/olive description, Taylor writes that his skin was "a darker hue consistent with the skin tone of people of the Middle East" (p. 163). Taylor thinks the BBC's reconstruction is "quite speculative" because reconstruction of cartilage (noses, etc.) is guesswork.

==== Forensic anthropology ====
In 2001, a new attempt was made to discover what the true race and face of Jesus might have been, and it was documented in the Son of God documentary series. The study, sponsored by the BBC, France 3 and the Discovery Channel, used one of three first-century Jewish skulls from a leading department of forensic science in Israel. A face was constructed using forensic anthropology by Richard Neave, a retired medical artist from the Unit of Art in Medicine at the University of Manchester, in collaboration with other British scientists. The face Neave constructed suggested that Jesus would have had a broad face and large nose, and differed significantly from the traditional depictions of Jesus in renaissance art.

Additional information about Jesus's skin color and hair was provided by Mark Goodacre, a senior lecturer at the Department of Theology and Religion at the University of Birmingham. Using third-century images from a synagogue – the earliest pictures of Jewish people – Goodacre proposed that Jesus's skin color would have been darker and swarthier than his traditional Western image. He also suggested that he would have had short, curly hair and a short cropped beard. In the First Epistle to the Corinthians, Paul the Apostle says "Does nature itself not teach you that it shames a man to have long hair?" This supports the argument that Jesus would have had short hair, the argument being that, as Paul allegedly knew many of the disciples and members of Jesus's family, it is unlikely that he would have written such a line had Jesus had long hair.

Although it was not exactly the face of Jesus, the result of the study determined that Jesus's skin would have been darker in complexion. Among the points which were made in the study was that the Bible says that Jesus's disciple Judas Iscariot needed to point him out to those who were arresting him. The implied argument is that if Jesus's physical appearance had differed markedly from the appearance of his disciples, he would have been relatively easy to identify, which can also simply mean they did not know who Jesus was nor his physical appearance. James H. Charlesworth says that Jesus's face was "most likely dark brown and sun-tanned", and his stature "may have been between five feet five and five feet seven".

== Acheiropoieta and reported visions ==
During the Middle Ages, a number of legendary images of Jesus began to appear; at times, they were probably constructed in order to validate the styles of the depictions of Jesus which were reported during that period, e.g. the image of Edessa. The Veil of Veronica was accompanied by a narrative about the Passion of Jesus.

A number of descriptions of Jesus have been reported by saints and mystics who claim that they have seen Jesus in visions. Reports of such visions are more common among Roman Catholics than they are among members of other Christian denominations.

By the 20th century, some reports of miraculous images of Jesus began to receive a significant amount of attention, e.g. Secondo Pia's photograph of the Shroud of Turin, one of the most controversial artifacts in history. During its May 2010 exposition, the shroud and its photograph of what some authors consider the face of Jesus were visited by more than two million people.

Another 20th-century depiction of Jesus, namely the Divine Mercy image, is based on Faustina Kowalska's reported vision, which she described in her diary as a pattern that was then painted by artists. The depiction is now widely used among Catholics, and it has more than a hundred million followers worldwide.

== Artistic portrayals ==
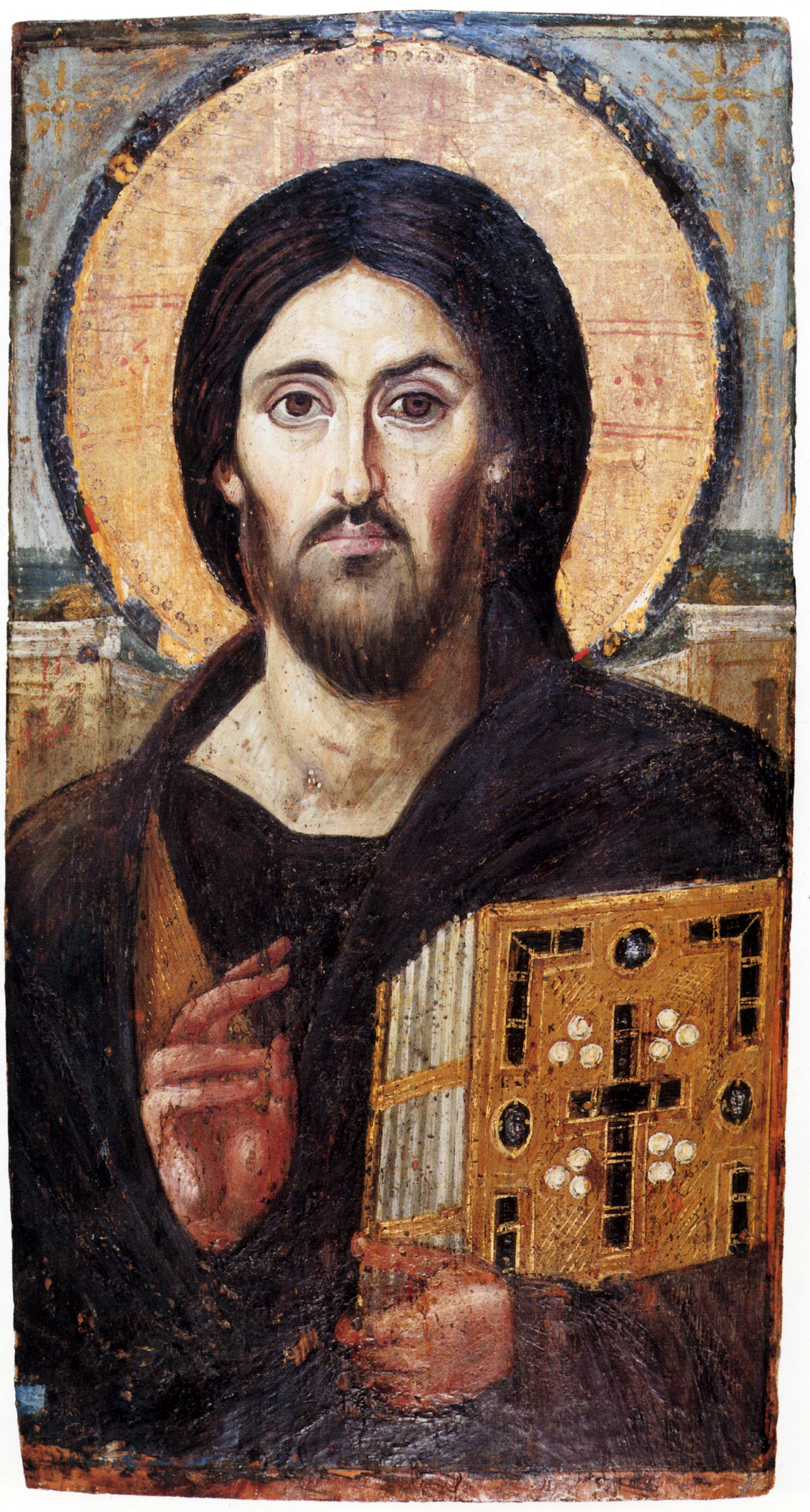
The oldest surviving Christ Pantocrator icon, sixth century, Saint Catherine's Monastery, Egypt

Despite the lack of biblical references or historical records, for two millennia a wide range of depictions of Jesus have appeared, often influenced by cultural settings, political circumstances and theological contexts. As in other forms of Christian art, the earliest depictions date to the late second or early third century, and they are primarily found in Rome. In these early depictions, Jesus is usually shown as a youthful figure who does not have a beard but does have curly hair; sometimes he is shown with features which are different from the features of the other men in the scenes, e.g. his disciples or the Romans. However, bearded depictions also appear very early on, perhaps drawing on an existing stereotype from the Greek world of the appearance of the many itinerant charismatic philosophers.

Although some images of Jews exist in the synagogue in Dura-Europos, and such images may have been common, their influence on the depictions of Jesus remains unknown. Christian depictions of Jesus which were produced during the 3rd and 4th centuries typically focused on New Testament scenes of healings and other miracles. Following the conversion of Constantine in the fourth century, Christian art found many wealthy donors and flourished. During this period, Jesus began to have more mature features, and he was also shown with a beard. A new development which occurred at this time was the depiction of Jesus without a narrative context; he was just depicted as a figure all by himself.

By the fifth century, depictions of the Passion began to appear, perhaps reflecting a change in the theological focus of the early Church. The sixth-century Rabbula Gospels include some of the earliest images of the crucifixion and resurrection. By the sixth century, the bearded depiction of Jesus had become standard, both in the East and in the West. These depictions of Jesus with reddish brown hair which is parted in the middle and almond shaped eyes remained consistent for several centuries. At this time, various legends were developed in order to validate the styles of the depictions, e.g. the image of Edessa and later the Veil of Veronica.

The Byzantine Iconoclasm acted as a barrier to developments in the East, but by the ninth century, art was again permitted. The Transfiguration of Jesus was a major theme in the East and every Eastern Orthodox monk who took up iconography needed to start his craft by producing the icon of the Transfiguration. Whereas Western depictions aim for proportion, the abolition of perspective and alterations in the size and proportion of an image in Eastern icons aim to reach beyond man's earthly dwellings.

The 13th century witnessed a turning point in the portrayal of the powerful Kyrios image of Jesus as a wonder worker in the West, as the Franciscans began to emphasize the humility of Jesus both at his birth and at his death via the Nativity scene as well as the crucifixion. The Franciscans approached both ends of this spectrum of emotions and as the joys of the Nativity were added to the agony of the crucifixion, a whole new range of emotions was ushered in, with wide-ranging cultural impact on the image of Jesus for centuries thereafter.

The Renaissance brought forth a number of artistic masters who focused on the depictions of Jesus and after Giotto, Fra Angelico and others systematically developed uncluttered images that focused on the depiction of Jesus with an ideal human beauty. Leonardo da Vinci's The Last Supper which is considered the first work of High Renaissance art due to its high level of harmony became well known for depicting Jesus surrounded by the varying emotions of the individual apostles at the announcement of the betrayal.

Objections to depictions of Jesus have appeared, e.g. in 1850 John Everett Millais was attacked for his painting Christ in the House of His Parents because it was "painful" to see "the youthful Saviour" depicted as "a red-headed Jew boy". The first cinematic portrayal of Jesus was in the 1897 film La Passion du Christ produced in Paris, which lasted five minutes. Thereafter cinematic portrayals have continued to show Jesus with a beard in the standard western depiction that resembles Renaissance images.

More recent artistic and cinematic portrayals have also made an effort to characterize Jesus as an ancient Middle Eastern resident. In the 2004 movie The Passion of the Christ, Jesus was portrayed by Jim Caviezel, who wore a prosthetic nose during filming and had his blue eyes digitally changed to light brown to give him a more Middle Eastern appearance. According to designer Miles Teves, who created the prosthesis: "Mel [Gibson] wanted to make the actor playing Jesus, James Caviezel, look more ethnically Middle Eastern, and it was decided that we could do it best by changing the shape of his nose."

== See also ==
- Black Madonna
- Depiction of Jesus
- Genetic studies of Jews
- Historical Jesus
- Jesus bloodline
- Jewish ethnic divisions
- Language of Jesus
- Life of Jesus
- Nativity of Jesus
