= Publius Cornelius Lentulus =

Publius Cornelius Lentulus was the name of a number of notable Romans:

- Publius Cornelius Lentulus Scipio, Roman senator, suffect consul in 24
- Publius Cornelius Lentulus Sura, Catiline conspirator
- Publius Cornelius Lentulus Spinther, provincial governor and a friend of Cicero

== See also ==
- Publius Lentulus
