= Weerdinge Men =

Pair of Iron Age bog bodies

Coordinates: 52°50′48″N 6°57′24″E

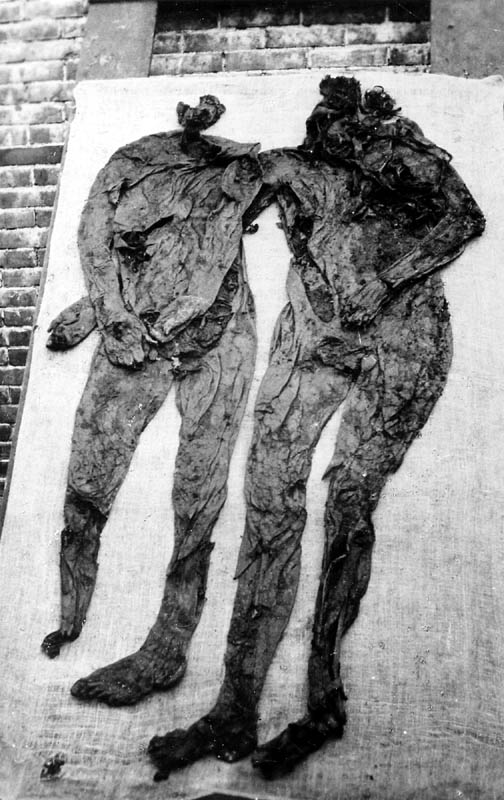
- The remains of the Weerdinge Men shortly after their discovery in 1904, prepared for air drying
- Born: Unknown; Unknown
- Died: c. 160 BC–AD 220; Bourtange Moor, Weerdinge, Drenthe, Netherlands
- Resting place: Drents Museum, Assen
- Known for: Iron Age bog bodies discovered in 1904

The Weerdinge Men (Dutch: Paar van Weerdinge) are a pair of remarkably well preserved Iron Age bog bodies discovered on 29 June 1904 in the southern part of the Bourtange moor near the village of Weerdinge in Drenthe, the Netherlands. Radiocarbon dating places their deaths between about 160 BC and AD 220. The men were originally known as the Weerdinge Couple because one of the bodies was thought to be female, but later examination confirmed that both individuals were adult males. Their preservation, paired deposition, and unusual injuries have made them one of the most studied archaeological finds in the Netherlands.

== Discovery ==
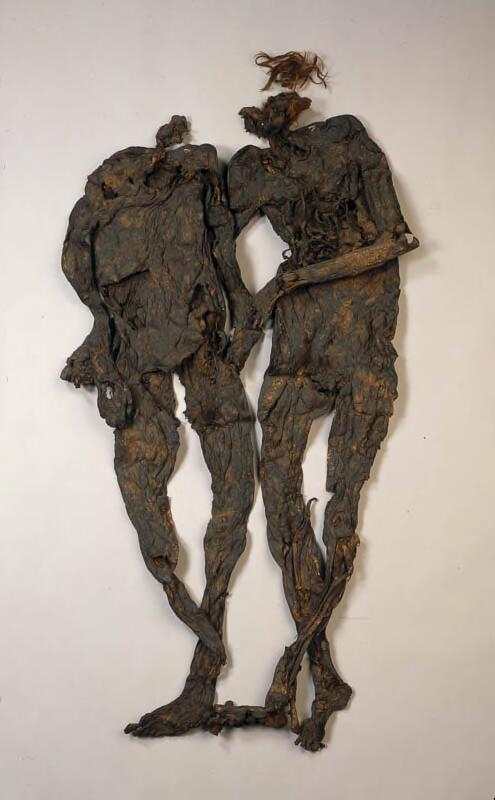
Weerdinge Men

The individuals who came to be known as the Weerdinge Men were discovered on 29 June 1904 by peat cutter Hildebrand Gringhuis while he was cutting peat in the southern part of the Bourtange moor near the village of Weerdinge, Drenthe, the Netherlands. The discovery was reported to the police soon afterwards, but the official report prepared for the district attorney has since been lost.

After the bodies were removed from the bog, they remained moist, flattened and flexible. A local constable folded the bodies together and placed them in a small box before transporting them to the cemetery at nearby Nieuw-Weerdinge for safekeeping.

Four days later, on 3 July 1904, Geert Jannes Landweer, a member of the board of the Drents Museum, travelled to Nieuw-Weerdinge after reading about the discovery in a newspaper. He photographed the bodies before conservation began, creating the earliest known images of the remains. Researchers have noted that comparison with later photographs indicates that the positions of the men's arms and legs changed after they had been unfolded at the cemetery.

== Condition ==
When the Weerdinge Men were discovered, both bodies were exceptionally well preserved despite having lain in the bog for nearly 2,000 years. They were still moist, flattened by the weight of the overlying peat, and flexible enough to be handled without breaking. The smaller man lay against the taller man's outstretched right arm, preserving the position in which the bodies were found.

The taller man had a large wound on the left side of his chest through which part of his intestines was visible. Both bodies retained extensive soft tissue, allowing facial features, skin, muscles, and hair to survive. The smaller man's head and neck were incomplete when the bodies were examined.

After they were removed from the bog, they were subsequently preserved by air drying, a process that permanently altered their appearance and the position of their limbs.

== Clothing and associated items ==
No clothing, textiles, tools, jewellery, or personal objects were found with the bodies.

== Scientific analysis ==
=== Sex identification ===
When the Weerdinge Men were discovered in 1904, they were initially identified as a man and a woman. The smaller individual's stature and bodily appearance contributed to his identification as female, while the two bodies were found lying closely together. They consequently became known as the "Weerdinge Couple", an interpretation that persisted for decades. The pair were also popularly called "Mr. and Mrs. Veenstra", a name playing on the Dutch word veen, meaning peat.

The identification remained largely unchallenged until a pathological examination in 1988 established that both individuals were male. Examination of the smaller individual identified beard stubble among the preserved facial soft tissues, providing anatomical evidence that he had previously been misidentified.

A further examination reported in 2023 by Raffaella Bianucci, Wijnand A. B. van der Sanden and colleagues identified both individuals as adult males. In the taller man, the penis and scrotum remain identifiable. In the smaller man, beard stubble remains visible in the preserved facial tissue.

Recognition that both individuals were male changed the long-standing interpretation of the remains as a male-female couple, but it did not establish the relationship between the two men. Their relationship to one another remains unknown.

=== Height ===
The two Weerdinge Men differed noticeably in height. When the bodies were recovered from the bog in 1904, the taller man measured about 175 cm (5 ft 9 in). More than a century later, his preserved remains measure about 169 cm (5 ft 7 in). The 2023 researchers reported the earlier measurement from Wijnand A. B. van der Sanden's study of the remains.

For the smaller man, only the later measurement is reported. His preserved body measures about 158 cm (5 ft 2 in). The researchers did not give a corresponding measurement from the time of his discovery or estimate his height during life. Unlike the taller man, whose measurements can be compared between 1904 and the present, the smaller man's recorded measurement describes the remains as they survive today.

=== Radiocarbon analysis ===
The Weerdinge Men have been dated to around the beginning of the Common Era, about 2,000 years ago. Earlier radiocarbon dating placed the remains between about 160 BC and AD 220.

In 2004, researchers Johannes van der Plicht, Wijnand A. B. van der Sanden, A. T. Aerts and H. J. Streurman used accelerator mass spectrometry (AMS) to date samples from northwestern European bog bodies, including the Weerdinge Men. AMS requires only a small sample, allowing different preserved tissues to be tested. Before dating, the samples were chemically treated to reduce contamination from the surrounding peat.

The researchers obtained several radiocarbon measurements from the Weerdinge remains. When the reliable measurements were combined, they produced a weighted radiocarbon age of 2000 ± 35 BP. In radiocarbon dating, BP means "before present", with 1950 used as the conventional starting point. Using the calibration available when the study was published in 2004, the result corresponded to approximately 40 BC to AD 50.

The later measurements therefore narrowed the estimated date of the Weerdinge Men from several centuries to a period around the beginning of the Common Era.

=== Health ===
Both men appear to have been well fed, with average body proportions for the Iron Age northern European population. No signs of chronic disease or long term malnutrition have been observed.

== Preservation ==
Nearly 2,000 years after their deaths, the Weerdinge Men remained partially preserved. CT scans showed that skin and other soft tissues were generally better preserved than the bones, many of which had become extensively demineralised.

In the taller man, the bones of the skull and neck had completely demineralised, leaving only soft tissue. Parts of his left forearm, hand and leg remained comparatively well preserved, although the softened bones of his feet and ankles had shifted out of position.

The shorter man was less well preserved. His head consisted only of skin and soft tissue, while his lower abdomen was largely empty except for the body wall. Possible remnants of the scapula, vertebral column and pelvis remained, together with some limb bones and individual toe bones in the left foot. Researchers concluded that the missing skull and neck bones in both men resulted from demineralisation rather than decapitation.

== Final days and cause of death ==
The most striking injury is found on the taller man, who had a deep chest wound on the left side. When the body was first examined in 1904, the intestines were visible protruding through the opening. Modern CT scans reveal sharply defined wound margins that indicate a perimortem injury. Guided endoscopy shows that the intestines extend through the wound, across the thoracic cavity, and downward into the abdomen, suggesting that the diaphragm may have been pierced or removed.

Classical writers such as Strabo describe Iron Age rituals in which entrails were examined for divination, but no direct evidence connects this practice to the Weerdinge Men.

The cause of death of the smaller man remains uncertain. His head and cervical vertebrae are missing, but imaging and chemical analysis attribute this to postmortem demineralisation rather than decapitation. No weapon injuries or signs of strangulation have been identified.

== Exhibition ==
The Weerdinge Men are held by the Drents Museum in Assen, northeastern Netherlands.

In 2014, they and Yde Girl appeared in Mummies – Overleven na de dood ("Mummies – Survival after Death"), which brought together about 60 naturally and artificially preserved human and animal remains. The exhibition later travelled to Budapest, Luxembourg, Hildesheim, Basel, Leoben, Stockholm and Cardiff. The 2016 stop in Basel also provided an opportunity for further scientific study of the Weerdinge Men.

From October 2019 to April 2021, the remains travelled about 10,000 kilometres (6,200 mi) for a five-museum tour of Japan as part of Mummies of the World. Beginning at the National Museum of Nature and Science in Tokyo, they travelled with a Drents Museum curator and were displayed in a climate-controlled case under restricted lighting.

After returning to the Netherlands, the Weerdinge Men appeared in Drentse veenlijken ("Bog Bodies of Drenthe"), alongside Yde Girl, Exloërmond Man, Emmer-Erfscheidenveen Man, Aschbroeken Man and a surviving human arm found near Erica.

== See also ==
- List of bog bodies
