= Jeremy Bowen =

Welsh journalist and TV presenter (born 1960)

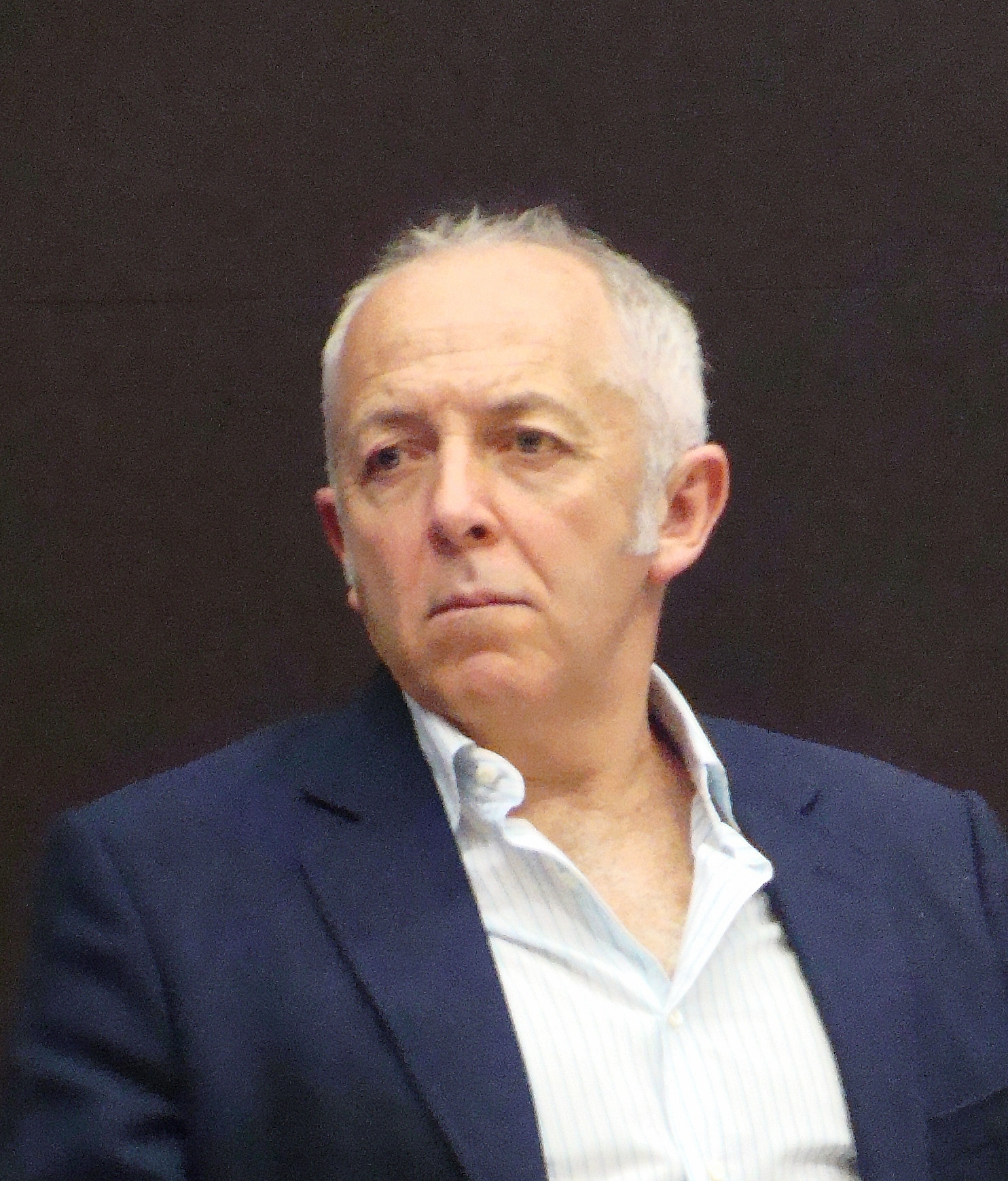
- Bowen in 2012
- Born: Jeremy Francis John Bowen; 6 February 1960 (age 66); Adamsdown, Cardiff, Wales
- Education: University College London; Johns Hopkins University
- Title: International Editor of BBC News (2022–present)
- Partner: Julia Williams
- Children: 2
- Jeremy Bowen's voice from the BBC programme Open Book, 11 November 2012.

Jeremy Francis John Bowen (born 6 February 1960) is a British journalist and television presenter.

Bowen was the BBC's Middle East correspondent based in Jerusalem between 1995 and 2000 and the BBC Middle East editor from 2005 to 2022, before being appointed the International Editor of BBC News in August 2022.

== Background ==
Jeremy Francis John Bowen was born on 6 February 1960 at Glossop Terrace Hospital opposite Cardiff Royal Infirmary in Adamsdown, Cardiff. He is the oldest of five children, with two brothers and two sisters. He grew up in the Whitchurch and Cyncoed areas. He was educated at De La Salle School, Rumney, Cardiff High School, University College London (BA History) and the Paul H. Nitze School of Advanced International Studies at Johns Hopkins University in Washington, DC. His father Gareth reported on the 1966 Aberfan coal slurry disaster for the BBC, and became editor of news at BBC Radio Wales.

== Career ==
Bowen joined the BBC in 1984 and has been a war correspondent for much of his career, starting with El Salvador in 1989. He has reported from more than 70 countries, predominantly in the Middle East and the Balkans.

During the Gulf War he was an eyewitness to the bodies being removed from the Al Amiriyan air raid shelter in Baghdad, where hundreds of civilians had been killed. Bowen reported that the casualties were women, children and older men. There were no military uniforms. The Pentagon and the UK Ministry of Defence affirmed that it was a command centre. The Daily Star compared Bowen to Lord Haw Haw who had broadcast from Berlin during the Second World War. Bowen received a substantial sum for libel as a result.

He reported from Bosnia-Herzegovina during the Bosnian War there, and from Kosovo during the 1999 conflict, during which he was robbed at gunpoint by bandits.

Bowen has been under fire on assignment a number of times. In what he was later to describe as the pivotal moment of his life, his colleague and friend Abed Takkoush was killed on 23 May 2000 in Lebanon. This took place while Bowen was covering the Israel Defense Forces' (IDF) pullout from Lebanon: Bowen's car came under tank fire from the IDF and his "fixer" and driver was killed.

Bowen and his cameraman escaped, but Bowen suffered post traumatic stress disorder and retreated from the frontline, moving to work in the studio as a presenter, hosting the daily news and entertainment morning show Breakfast with Sophie Raworth between 2000 and 2002. He was also a guest host on the satirical panel game Have I Got News for You, and presented the BBC's 2001 three-part series Son of God, an investigation into the life of Jesus. In 2002 he presented Moses, a similar documentary that chronicled the life of Moses.

Bowen declined the chance to cover the 2003 invasion of Iraq from Baghdad. Nonetheless, he returned to the field in March 2003 as a special correspondent, during which time he covered the death of Pope John Paul II.

He became the BBC's first Middle East Editor when the position was created in June 2005 after the 2004 Balen Report on the BBC's coverage of the Israeli-Palestinian conflict to provide a broader perspective on wider Middle East issues and to add context to the reporting of events on the ground.

In 2005, he published the book Six Days: How the 1967 War Shaped the Middle East.

On 11 May 2008, Bowen and his camera operator again came under fire in Mount Lebanon. Nobody was injured and the incident was caught on camera.

In April 2009, the Editorial Standards Committee of the BBC Trust published a report on three complaints, including one by the Committee for Accuracy in Middle East Reporting in America, brought against two news items involving Bowen. The complaints included 24 allegations of breaching BBC guidelines on accuracy and impartiality, of which three were fully or partially upheld. The BBC Trust's censure was based on articles about Har Homa in the 1960s, how the Six-Day War affected the Middle East and an article on the aftermath of that war. Although there was no finding of anti-Israel bias against Bowen, the BBC Trust said that he should have used clearer language and been more precise in some aspects of the piece.

The BBC Trust accepted that for a claim that was found to be lacking in accuracy that Bowen had been provided with the information by an authoritative source. A website article was amended and Bowen did not face any disciplinary measures. Bowen voiced opposition to the censure, calling it a result of a "campaign group" whom he called "the enemies of impartiality".

In February 2011, Bowen became the first British journalist to interview Muammar Gaddafi since the start of the 2011 Libyan civil war against him and the government. As the conflict progressed at least two of Bowen's notebooks were either lost or stolen. One of these notebooks was subsequently found in the remains of a military convoy, which the rebel force that attacked it said contained Gaddafi's son, Khamis. The notebook contained both Bowen's words and a number of notes in Arabic detailing military manoeuvres and a list of persons to be detained.

On 5 July 2013, Bowen was reporting for the BBC on the protests in Egypt regarding the former President Morsi when he was shot in the head with shotgun pellets. He escaped without major injury, and was taken away by his colleagues and bandaged up.

He was one of the few journalists inside Syria reporting on the civil war. In February 2015, he spoke with President Bashar al-Assad about the continuing Syrian conflict, during an exclusive BBC interview.

Since March 2022, Bowen has also reported from Ukraine during the Russo-Ukrainian War.

In October 2023, the BBC reported on the Gaza war, including a report on an explosion at Al-Ahli Hospital in Gaza City. Bowen was the editor responsible for overseeing this coverage, and has been criticised for the BBC's reporting on the incident for saying that an Israeli airstrike "flattened" the hospital. The cause of the explosion remains contested. In the days following the incident, Western intelligence agencies stated that the fire was most likely the result of a misfired rocket by Palestinian Islamic Jihad in a rocket attack on Israeli civilians. However, in its investigation on 20 October 2023, Forensic Architecture concluded that the blast was the result of a munition fired from the direction of Israel. The BBC apologized for its reporting, saying, "We accept that even in this fast-moving situation it was wrong to speculate in this way about the possible causes and we apologise for this, although [our correspondent] did not at any point report that it was an Israeli strike."

== Personal life ==
Bowen lives in Camberwell, south London, with his partner Julia Williams, also a BBC journalist. They have a son and a daughter.

He is a supporter of Cardiff City.

On 1 April 2019 Bowen announced that he had undergone treatment to remove a tumour in his bowel.

== Awards ==
- New York Television Festival 1995 – Best News Correspondent
- 1993 Monte Carlo International TV Festival Silver Nymph for Bosnia war coverage
- RTS Best Breaking News Report 1996 – Best Breaking News report, for his coverage of the assassination of Israel's President Yitzhak Rabin
- Sony Gold award for News Story of the Year on the arrest of Saddam Hussein
- Part of the BBC teams that won a BAFTA for their Kosovo coverage.
- International Emmy 2006 for BBC News, for its coverage, led by Bowen, of the 2006 Lebanon War
- 2009 Prix Bayeux Calvados for war reporting (Gaza)
- 2010 Charles Wheeler Award for achievements in broadcast journalism
- 2012 Peace Through Media Award at the 8th annual International Media Awards in London.
- 2012 Prix Bayeux Calvados for war reporting (Syria)
- 2013 Peabody Award for reporting Syria's war
- 2013 News and Documentary Emmy for Syria reporting
- 2013 RTS Specialist Journalist of the Year
- 2014 RTS Television Journalist of the Year
- 2014 BAFTA Cymru Siân Phillips award
- 2015 James Cameron Memorial Award
- 2015 Frontline Club Award for Yemen reporting
- 2016 RTS Interview of the Year for an interview with President Assad of Syria
- 2016 Prix Bayeux Calvados for war reporting
- Fellow University College London 2005
- Honorary Fellow: Cardiff University, 2009; University of South Wales, 2013; Cardiff Metropolitan University, 2015; Aberystwyth University, 2015.
- Honorary Doctor of Social Sciences Nottingham Trent University, 2014

== Bibliography ==
- Jeremy Bowen, Six Days - How the 1967 War Shaped the Middle East (2003). ISBN 0-7434-4969-X (pbk). History.
- Jeremy Bowen, War Stories (2006). ISBN 0-7432-3094-9 (hbk); ISBN 0-7434-4968-1 (pbk). Autobiography.
- Jeremy Bowen, The Arab Uprisings - The People Want the Fall of the Regime (2012). ISBN 978-0-85720-884-2 (hbk); ISBN 978-0-85720-885-9 (pbk)
- Jeremy Bowen, The Making of the Modern Middle East: A Personal History (2022). ISBN 978-1-76126-355-2

Media offices
Preceded by Position created	Middle East Editor: BBC News; 2005–2022	Incumbent

Media offices
Preceded by Position created	International Editor: BBC News; 2022–present	Incumbent
