= Yde =

- Village
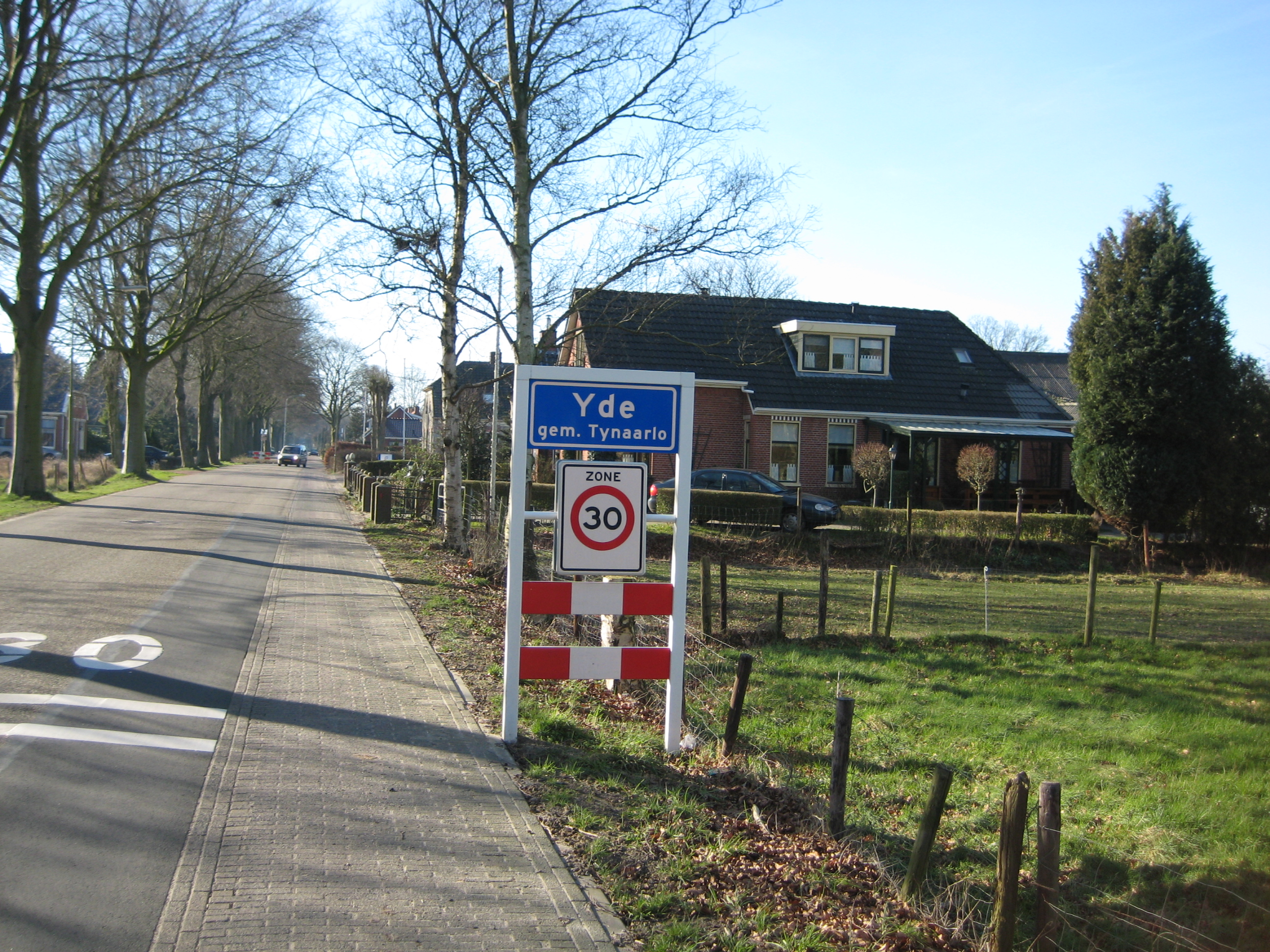
- Village in 2008

- Flag

- Location in Drenthe in the Netherlands Yde (Netherlands)
- Coordinates: 53.1152°N 6.5929°E
- Country: Netherlands
- Province: Drenthe
- Municipality: Tynaarlo

Area
  - Total: 6.08 km^{2} (2.35 sq mi)
- Elevation: 4.1 m (13 ft)

Population (2021)
  - Total: 840
  - Density: 140/km^{2} (360/sq mi)
- Time zone: UTC+1 (CET)
  - Summer (DST): UTC+2 (CEST)
- Postal code: 9494
- Dialing code: 050

Yde (Dutch pronunciation: [ˈidə]) is a village in the municipality of Tynaarlo in the province of Drenthe in the Netherlands. It lies about 11 km south of Groningen. Yde is twinned with De Punt as Yde-De Punt, however both remain separate villages.

Yde is known as the location near to where the bog body of the Yde Girl was discovered in 1897 and whose long hair has remained. She was strangled, and is on display in the Drents Museum.

The village was first mentioned 1206 as Ide. The etymology is unclear. Yde was home to 258 people in 1840. During World War II, there was a forced labour camp near Yde which mainly consisted of people arrested in neighbouring Friesland. The labourers had to build a defence line.

== Gallery ==
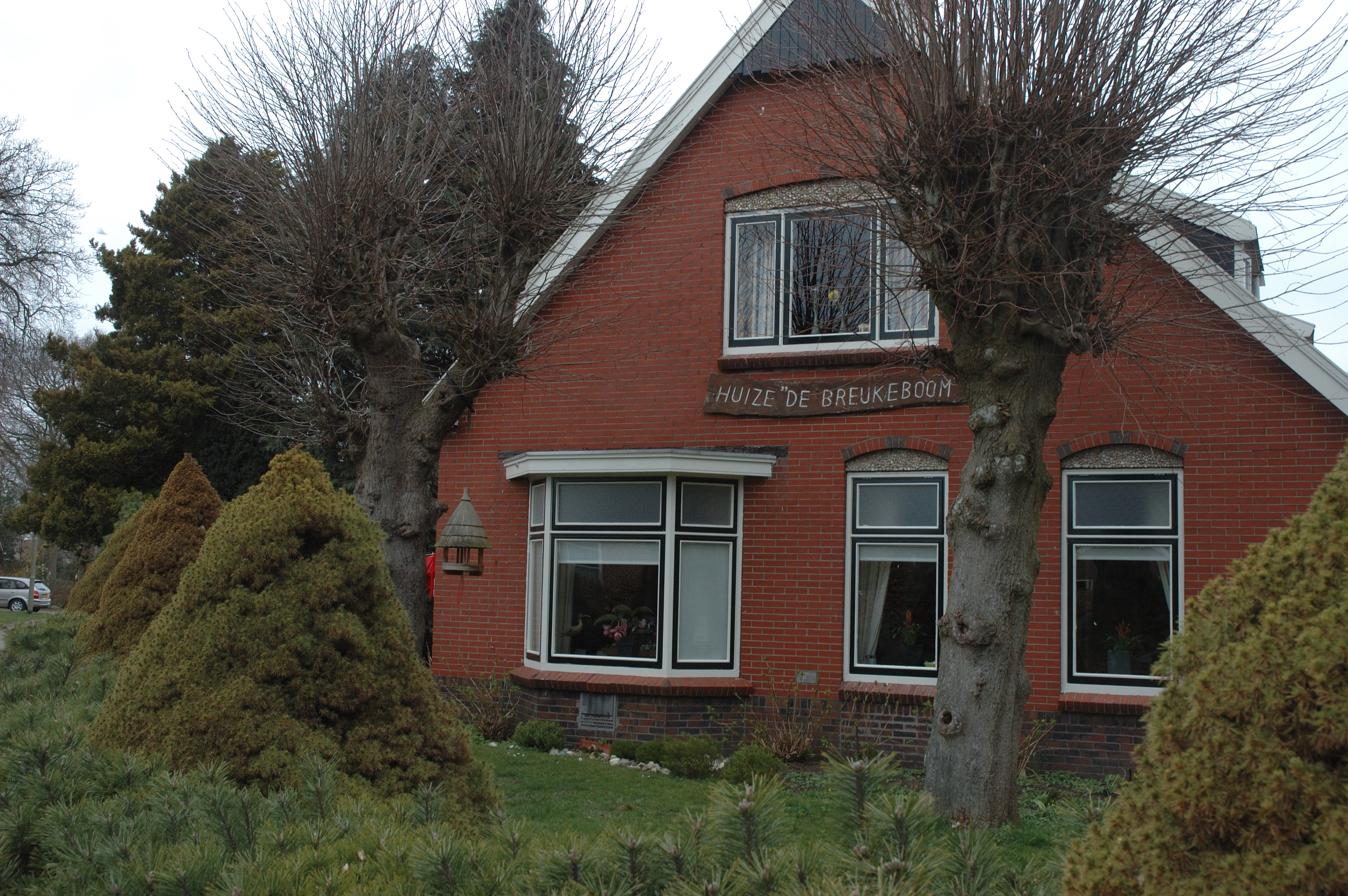
Farm in Yde

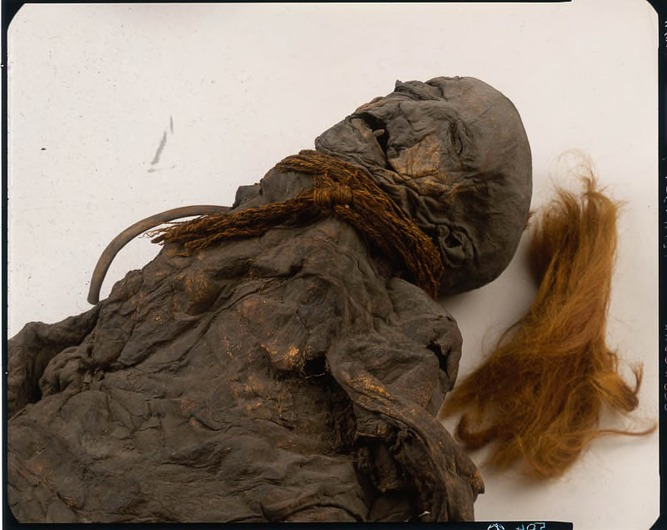
Yde Girl
