= Moses (TV programme) =

- Genre: Documentary
- Directed by: Jean-Claude Bragard
- Presented by: Jeremy Bowen
- Starring: Nadim Sawalha
- Narrated by: Jeremy Bowen
- Country of origin: United Kingdom
- Original language: English
- No. of series: 1
- No. of episodes: 1

Production
- Camera setup: Single-camera

Original release
- Network: BBC One
- Release: 1 December 2002

Related
- Son of God

Moses is a British documentary programme about the prophet Moses, incorporating scientific and contemporary historical evidence.

It was first broadcast in the United Kingdom at 8 p.m. on 1 December 2002, and was produced and joint-sponsored by the BBC and TLC in association with Jerusalem Productions.

Moses was commissioned by the BBC in July 2001 following the success of a similar series, Son of God, which had been broadcast three months earlier—it documented the life of Moses is a style similar to that which Son of God had previously done for Jesus Christ. It was presented by Jeremy Bowen, a former Middle East correspondent for BBC News, and was directed by Jean-Claude Bragard. Moses featured live-action reenactments, computer-generated images of the period and interviews with historians and scholars.
