= Son of God (TV series) =

British television documentary series

- Also known as: Jesus: The Complete Story; Jesus: The Real Story
- Genre: Documentary; Factual
- Directed by: Jean-Claude Bragard
- Presented by: Jeremy Bowen
- Starring: Liron Levo
- Narrated by: Jeremy Bowen; Avery Brooks; Tom Hodgkins
- Theme music composer: James Whitbourn
- Opening theme: "Son of God Mass"
- Country of origin: United Kingdom
- Original language: English
- No. of series: 1
- No. of episodes: 3

Production
- Executive producer: Ruth Pitt
- Production locations: Israel, Palestine, Jordan, United States
- Camera setup: Single-camera
- Running time: 50 minutes per episode

Original release
- Network: BBC One
- Release: 1 April – 15 April 2001

Related
- Moses

Son of God (also known as Jesus: The Complete Story and Jesus: The Real Story) is a British documentary series that chronicles the life of Jesus Christ using scientific and contemporary historical evidence. It was presented by Jeremy Bowen, and its first episode premiered in the United Kingdom on 1 April 2001. The executive producer was Ruth Pitt and it was directed by Jean-Claude Bragard—it took a total of 16 months to produce and cost £1.5 million. A full symphonic score was composed by James Whitbourn. Son of God featured interviews with 21 historians and other Biblical experts, live action reenactments of the life of Jesus with Leron Livo in the lead role, and computer-generated images of what locations from Jesus's time might have looked like. These images, created by design team Red Vision, were praised by critics and received an Outstanding Achievement Award at the 2001 Royal Television Society North Awards.

Son of God ran for a single series of three episodes, each of which focused on a different stage of Jesus's life. The first episode, "The Real Man", looked at the historical evidence for the existence of Jesus, and documented his life from his birth to his temptation. Episode two, "The Mission", discussed how Jesus became popular among Jews and Greeks, and why the Pharisees of the area might have seen him as a threat. "The Final Hours", the third and final episode of Son of God, looked at Jesus's crucifixion, and presented some ideas as to how the traditional views of the crucifixion may conflict with how it really occurred. The episode concluded with the construction of a computer-generated animation of how Jesus may have appeared.

Critical reaction to the series was mixed. While some reviewers praised the programme for being worthy of its publicity by focusing on history rather than spirituality, others remarked that it was dumbed down and went off on strange tangents. The reliability of the facial reconstruction was also questioned. Son of God first aired in the UK on BBC One during April 2001, where it received a viewership of six million and an audience share of 25%. In the United States, the series was shown on the Discovery Channel under the name Jesus: The Complete Story as a single three-hour programme, two weeks after its UK broadcast. The show was also licensed to countries including France, Denmark and New Zealand.

== Production ==
Son of God was devised in 1999, and was produced and joint-sponsored by BBC Manchester and the Discovery Channel in association with France 3 and Jerusalem Productions. The show was directed by Jean-Claude Bragard—whose previous BBC work had included Kicking & Screaming – A History of Football and the documentary series Panorama—and the executive producer was Ruth Pitt, who had worked on documentaries such as 42 Up and Channel 4's The State of Marriage. During its promotion, Pitt described Son of God as "the most complete biography of Jesus that [had] ever been done".

"Son of God is one of the most exciting projects with which to launch the spring summer season. In some ways, it is the epitome of my new BBC One – it is accessible, modern in its approach and is not afraid to challenge some cast-in-stone beliefs about what makes a mainstream popular programme."

— Lorraine Heggessey, controller of BBC One when Son of God was first broadcast

Jeremy Bowen, a former Middle East correspondent for BBC News, was chosen to present the programme for its UK broadcast. Despite not being religious, he was drawn to the programme for its use of scientific and historical information. As well as presenting, Bowen also narrated and scripted large portions of the series. He stated that he brought a degree of scepticism to the show: before the first episode aired, he admitted that he did not think that you could "corroborate anything that was in the Gospels". In the US version of Son of God, which was broadcast on the Discovery Channel and retitled Jesus: The Complete Story, the footage of Bowen was edited out and his narration was redubbed by American actor Avery Brooks. It was also released in this format under the name Jesus: The Real Story, with narration from Tom Hodgkins.

Son of God took 16 months to produce, and cost approximately £1.5 million. It was featured as part of a £253 million season of new television programming on the BBC during the spring of 2001. British conductor James Whitbourn was commissioned to write a complete symphonic score for the series, which was performed by the BBC Philharmonic. The completed programme featured more than an hour and a half of Whitbourn's music. Whitbourn subsequently used the seminal themes from his orchestral score as the basis of his popular choral work, Son of God Mass, for soprano saxophone, choir and organ. Computer graphic images were created by design group Red Vision, who employed techniques similar to ones used in the 2000 BBC series Walking with Dinosaurs. Speaking in September 2001, a spokesman for Red Vision stated that their involvement in Son of God had been "incredibly successful" for them.

Promotional campaigns for both the British and American broadcasts of the series focused on the technology and science being used in the programme, and the special effects that Red Vision had created. In particular, a facial reconstruction during the final episode showing what Jesus might have looked like garnered significant media attention. In the lead-up to episode one, several newspapers ran stories speculating whether the computer-generated image could show the true face of Jesus. British television listings magazine Radio Times featured the reconstructed face on the cover of its 31 March issue under the headline "Is This the Face of Jesus?". This cover and its headline received criticism from some commentators for being sensationalist and misleading.

== Episodes ==
Son of God consists of a single series of three episodes. Each episode lasts approximately 50 minutes and documents a different stage of Jesus's life. The episodes take the format of Bowen visiting significant locations from the life of Jesus, talking head interviews with 21 historians and Biblical experts, and reenactments of Jesus's life featuring Israeli actor Liron Levo. Locations from Jesus's time—such as Caesarea, Yatta and Sepphoris—were recreated by archaeologists using evidence from buildings and street plans, and were then digitised into computer graphics by Red Vision.

=== "The Real Man" ===
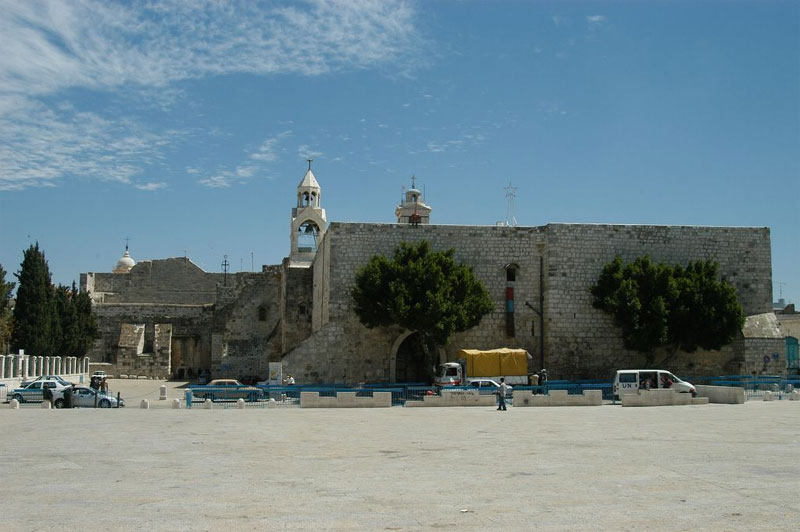
The Church of the Nativity in Bethlehem is one of several locations visited by Bowen during the first episode of Son of God.

The first episode of Son of God, "The Real Man", documents Jesus's life up to his temptation, and details the historical evidence for his existence. Bowen visits Jerusalem, where he calls Jesus's death "one of the best attested facts in ancient history". He cites the Romano-Jewish historian Josephus as one of 80 sources that confirms that Jesus existed and that describes him as "a wise man who did surprising feats, ... won over followers from among Jews and Greeks, ... was accused by the Jewish leaders, [and] was condemned to be crucified by Pilate". Bowen interviews James H. Charlesworth from Princeton University about the discovery of the Dead Sea Scrolls in 1947, then travels to Bethlehem to visit the Church of the Nativity, a structure built over a series of first-century caves and grottos. While there, he speculates that Jesus may have been born in a cave rather than an inn, the more traditional image. Joe Zias, an archaeologist from the Hebrew University of Jerusalem confirms this, saying that the Greek word "katalyma" is usually translated into English as "upper room" rather than "inn".

"The Real Man" also looks at the story of the Star of Bethlehem, which Bowen states would have been an "astrological" rather than "astronomical" phenomenon. According to astronomer Michael Molner, astrologers from around the time of Herod the Great would have believed that the constellation Aries symbolised his kingdom and the lands that he controlled – during 6 BC, the year that some scholars theorise that Jesus was born, a rare planetary alignment meant that Jupiter, Saturn, the Sun and the Moon would have all appeared in this constellation. Bowen next looks at how Jesus would have been born out of wedlock: Mark Goodacre, a historian from the University of Birmingham, asserts that Jewish, pagan and Christian sources all confirm that Jesus was born out of wedlock, as do both the Gospels of Matthew and Luke. All four canonical gospels agree that the city of Nazareth was where Jesus grew up. Hanan Eshel, an archaeologist from Bar-Ilan University, proposes that Jesus's interest in religion and politics might have been sparked off during a family visit to the Temple Mount, the "headquarters of the Jewish faith". The episode ends with Bowen spending the night alone at the Mount of Temptation just above Jericho, where Jesus is traditionally believed to have spent 40 days and nights being tempted by the devil.

=== "The Mission" ===
Episode two, "The Mission", discusses how Jesus became popular and why the Pharisees might have seen him as a potential threat. Bowen visits the Dome of the Rock, the site of Jerusalem's temple, and discusses how Jesus went to the Sea of Galilee to recruit his disciples. He speaks with Orna Cohen, a conservator of antiquities who led the excavation of the Sea of Galilee Boat, who suggests that the boat may have been similar to one owned by Saint Peter. Bowen then travels to Capernaum and visits the House of Peter, where he speaks to Mordechai Aviam, an archaeologist from the Israel Antiquities Authority. Aviam states that first-century Greek "graffiti" in the house suggests that the house belonged to Peter. Bowen visits the tomb of a first-century scholar and miracle-worker named Hanina ben Dosa, and contrasts Hanina's life with that of Jesus's: for example, while Jesus was executed, Hanina was not.

"The Mission" then looks at how Jesus may have been viewed by the religious leaders of the time. The canonical gospels report over one hundred cases of Jesus healing or performing exorcisms, and "making the unclean clean again". Jesus told lepers to go up to the Temple Mount, where they were usually excluded, and claimed that he could forgive sins without going through the ordinary channels. Jesus met and ate with sinners, the disabled and prostitutes, and fulfilled Old Testament prophecy by riding into the Temple Mount through the Golden Gate on a donkey at Passover. Bowen concludes that all these reasons would have meant that the Pharisees of the time would have seen him as threatening.

=== "The Final Hours" ===
The final episode of Son of God ends with a facial reconstruction of how Jesus may have looked by forensic anthropologist Richard Neave. The constructed face suggests that Jesus's skin would have been "olive-coloured" and "swarthy", and much darker than his traditional depiction in Western art.

"The Final Hours", the third episode of Son of God, details Jesus's last days alive. Bowen claims that the Last Supper would have been held in the guest room of a "well-to-do" house in Jerusalem. Writings by Josephus suggest that the Last Supper took place in a triclinium. As guest of honour, Jesus would have been at the end of the table with John the Apostle at his side, rather than at the centre, as proposed by more familiar depictions such as Leonardo da Vinci's The Last Supper. Bowen then looks at whether or not Jesus could have sweated blood at Gethsemane. Leaving the Middle East for the first time, he travels to New York City and meets with Frederick Zugibe, a forensic pathologist at Columbia University. Zugibe states that Jesus may have been suffering from hematidrosis, a medical condition brought about by stress from knowing that one is about to die. He also says that he has seen similar symptoms in sailors and in men given death sentences. Zugibe experiments on volunteers in Rutland County, Vermont, by measuring their blood pressure while they are strapped to crosses with their arms outstretched and level with their shoulders. He concludes that the traditional view of Jesus's crucifixion, with the nails of the cross driven through his hands rather than wrists, may have been possible if his feet were supported. The 1968 discovery of the skeleton of Jehohanan, a first-century man who was put to death by crucifixion, also supports this theory. Next, Bowen questions whether the disciple Judas Iscariot truly did double-cross Jesus. William Klassen, an historian at École Biblique in Jerusalem, theorises that the Greek word "paradidomi" was mistranslated, and that Judas simply "handed over" Jesus to the Romans, rather than betrayed him.

"The Final Hours" ends with a facial reconstruction suggesting what Jesus may have looked like. Using one of three first-century Jewish skulls from a forensic science department in Israel, a clay model is created through forensic anthropology by Richard Neave, a retired medical artist from the Unit of Art in Medicine at Manchester University. The face that Neave constructs suggests that Jesus would have had a broad face and large nose, and differs significantly from his traditional depictions in renaissance art. Additional information about Jesus's skin colour and hair is provided by Goodacre. Using third-century images from the Dura-Europos synagogue—the earliest pictures of Jewish people—Goodacre proposes that Jesus's skin would have been "olive-coloured" and "swarthy", and much darker than his traditional Western image. He also suggests that Jesus would have had short, curly hair and a short cropped beard.

== Reception ==
=== Critical reception ===
"[Son of God] turned out to be worthy of all [its] publicity, as the stunning graphics that recreated Jesus's face were used to bring his life to gritty reality – somewhat removed from Biblical views of Christ."

— Michael Osborn of BBC News

Critical reaction to Son of God was mixed. The series received praise from commentators such as Andrew Billen of the New Statesman for focussing on "history against spirituality every time". However, Billen also contrasted the show with The Lives of Jesus, a similar series from December 1996, remarking that it was flash and filmic, whereas The Lives of Jesus had been far more discreet. BBC News's Michael Osborn acclaimed the series, saying that it was "worthy of all [its] publicity" and that Bowen was well placed in his role as presenter. The graphics created by Red Vision were well received: The Daily Record described the computer imagery as stunning, while Gareth McLean of The Guardian noted that the series was "visually, ... quite a treat". McLean also commented that the programme itself was rather interesting, but that it contained "slightly odd, slightly irrelevant diversions".

A review of a more critical nature came from Catherine Bennett, also writing for The Guardian, who questioned the facial reconstruction from the third episode and suggested that it was dismissive to imply that it was how Jesus truly appeared. Speaking about the study, Bennett remarked: "We must hope that ... future BBC controllers do not dig up, say, Robin Cook's skull, drape it in Plasticine, and ask: 'Is this the real face of Tony Blair?'". John Preston, writing for The Sunday Telegraph, also questioned the reliability of the reconstruction, and branded the series as dumbed down. The programme received criticism from theological scholars: following the broadcast of the first episode, Tom Wright, one of two consultants used during production of the series, felt that Jesus's mission had been misrepresented by the show. Wright claimed that the BBC had elected to portray Jesus simply as "a politically correct social worker".

"The program likes to make sweeping statements, which isn't surprising for a show that has the audacity to use the title Jesus: The Complete Story."

— Hal Boedeker of The Orlando Sentinel

Reviews of the American broadcast of Jesus: The Complete Story were also mixed. While some reviewers described the show as fascinating and reverent, others were more negative. Writing for The Orlando Sentinel, Hal Boedeker agreed that the computer imaging was spectacular, but that the rest of the show was a "hodgepodge" that "[went] off on some strange tangents". Eric Mink of The Daily News stated that the show relied too heavily on exaggeration and that it was "sloppy with facts", while Ann Rodgers-Melnick of the Pittsburgh Post-Gazette described it as "uneven but vivid".

=== Ratings and awards ===
The first episode of Son of God shown in the UK gained six million viewers and an audience share of 25%, which was considered high for a religious documentary. During its American broadcast on the Discovery Channel, the series was watched by 12 million. It was repeated in the US during March the following year, and gained a figure of 1.5 million viewers per episode. The series was nominated for two awards, both for the computer-generated images created by graphics team Red Vision: it was first nominated at the 2001 LEAF Awards, then won an Outstanding Achievement award at the 2001 Royal Television Society North Awards.

Year	Award	Category	Result
2001	LEAF Award	Special Area, Animation	Nominated
2001	Royal Television Society North Award	Outstanding Achievement in a Craft or Technology	Won

== Distribution ==
Son of God was distributed by the BBC, who broadcast the show on BBC One. It premiered in the UK at 9:10 p.m. on 1 April 2001, and ran for a single series of three episodes, with each episode being shown weekly on Sunday nights. As well as being shown in the UK, Son of God was also licensed to New Zealand and seven European territories, including France and Denmark. In the United States, the show was aired by the Discovery Channel under the name Jesus: The Complete Story, as a single three-hour special at 8 p.m. on 15 April, two weeks after its UK broadcast. It was also repeated in the US on Christmas Day 2002 and 2003.

In March 2002, a year after the show was first broadcast in the UK, an accompanying book written by Angela Tilby was released. Tilby's book, also titled Son of God, was a tie-in to the documentary series, and featured an introduction from Bowen. A VHS box set of Jesus: The Complete Story, produced by Warner Home Video, was released in the United States on 15 May 2001. The set was rereleased on Region 1 DVD on 31 August 2004.

== Moses ==
Following the success of Son of God, a similar, single-episode documentary was commissioned by the BBC in July 2001. The programme, entitled Moses, documented the life of Moses is a style akin to Son of God—it reunited Bowen and Bragard, who presented and directed-produced the show respectively. Like Son of God, Moses featured live-action reenactments, computer-generated images of the period and interviews with historians and scholars. It was first broadcast in the UK during December 2002.

== See also ==
- 2001 in British television
- Depiction of Jesus
- Historical Jesus
- Race and appearance of Jesus
