= Yde (name) =

Yde may refer to the following notable people:

Given name

- Yde Johan "Eddy" van Hijum, Dutch politician
- Yde Schloenbach Blumenschein (1882–1963), Brazilian poet and chronicler

Surname

- Breanna Yde (born 2003), American actress
- Emil Yde (1900–1968), American baseball player
- Ole Yde (born 1978), Danish fashion designer
