= Weerdinge =

- Neighbourhood
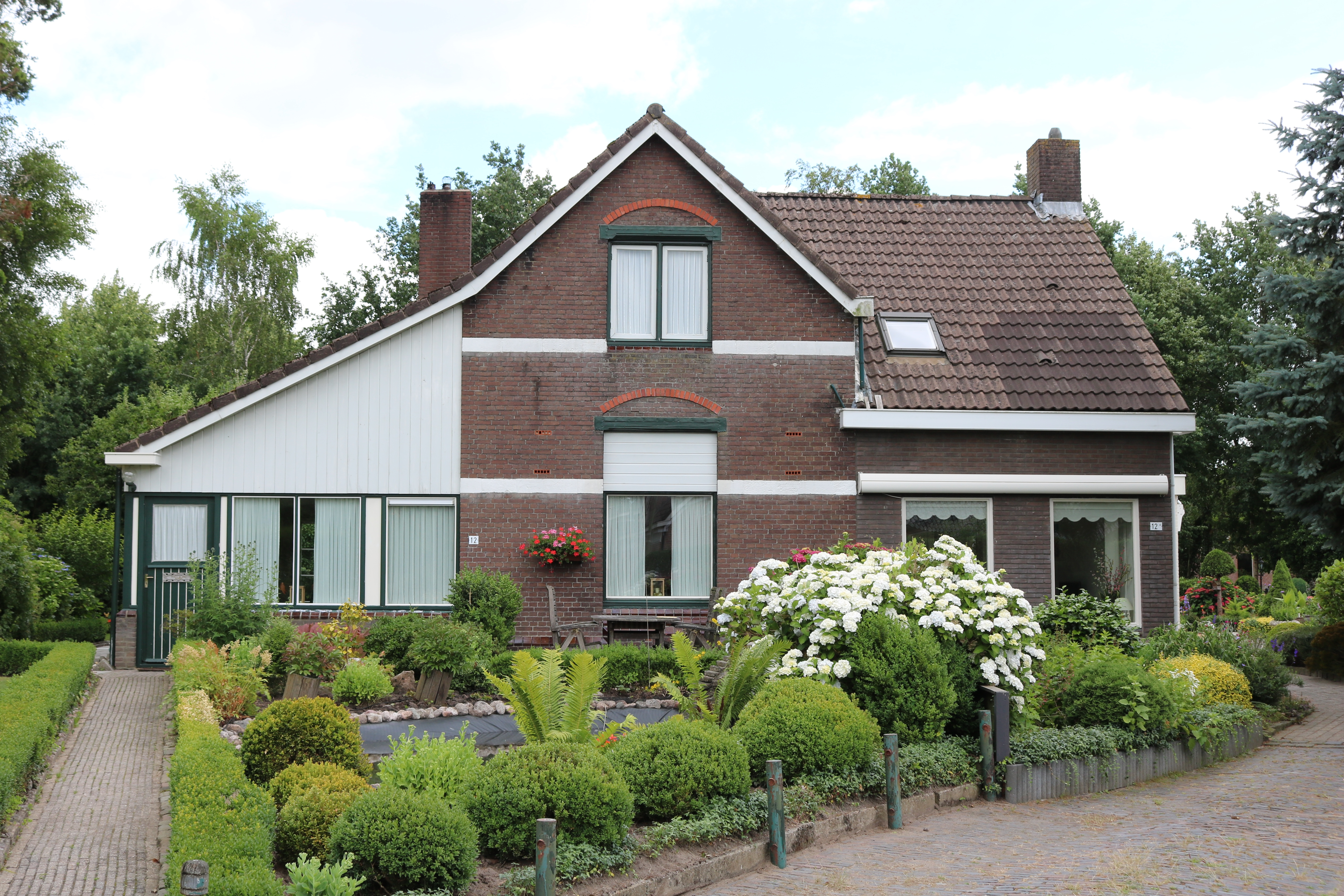
- Former train station of Weerdinge

- Location in province of Drenthe in the Netherlands Weerdinge (Netherlands)
- Coordinates: 52°49′N 6°55′E
- Country: Netherlands
- Province: Drenthe
- Municipality: Emmen

Area
  - Total: 1.26 km^{2} (0.49 sq mi)
- Elevation: 25 m (82 ft)

Population (2021)
  - Total: 580
  - Density: 460/km^{2} (1,200/sq mi)
- Time zone: UTC+1 (CET)
  - Summer (DST): UTC+2 (CEST)
- Postal code: 7814
- Dialing code: 0591

Weerdinge is a neighbourhood and former village of Emmen in the Dutch province of Drenthe.

== History ==
Weerdinge is an esdorp which developed in the 10th century, on the road from Emmen naar Exloo. It was first mentioned in 1327 as Weerdighen. The name means "the people of Wardo". In 1905, a railway line between Emmen and Stadskanaal was laid and a train station was built in Weerdinge. The line closed in 1963. In 1932, it was home to 977 people. The gristmill De Hondsrug was built in 1910 and was restored in 1988.

In 1978, Weerdinge was annexed by neighbouring Emmen, and has become a neighbourhood.

== The Pair of Weerdinge ==
On 29 June 1904, a pair of bog bodies were discovered by Hilbrand Gringhuis. Initially, it was thought that it was a man and a woman, but it has been established that they are two unrelated men. They have been dated 92 BC to 70 AD. Both have probably been killed. Both bodies are on display at the Drents Museum.

== Gallery ==
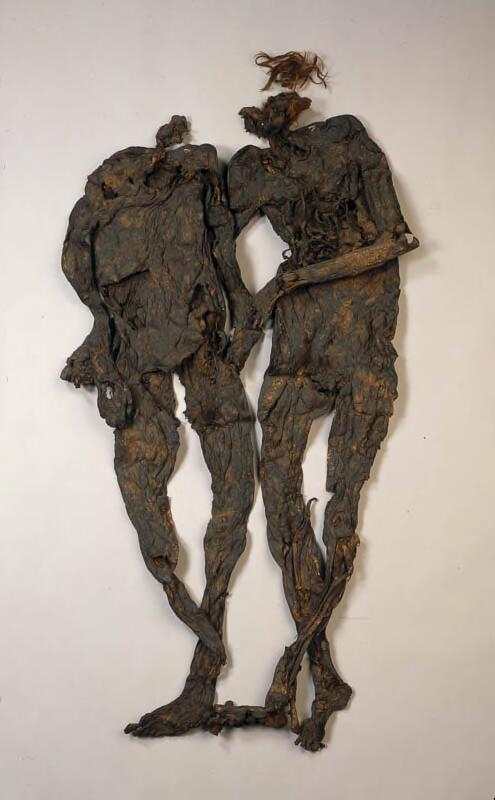
The Pair of Weerdinge

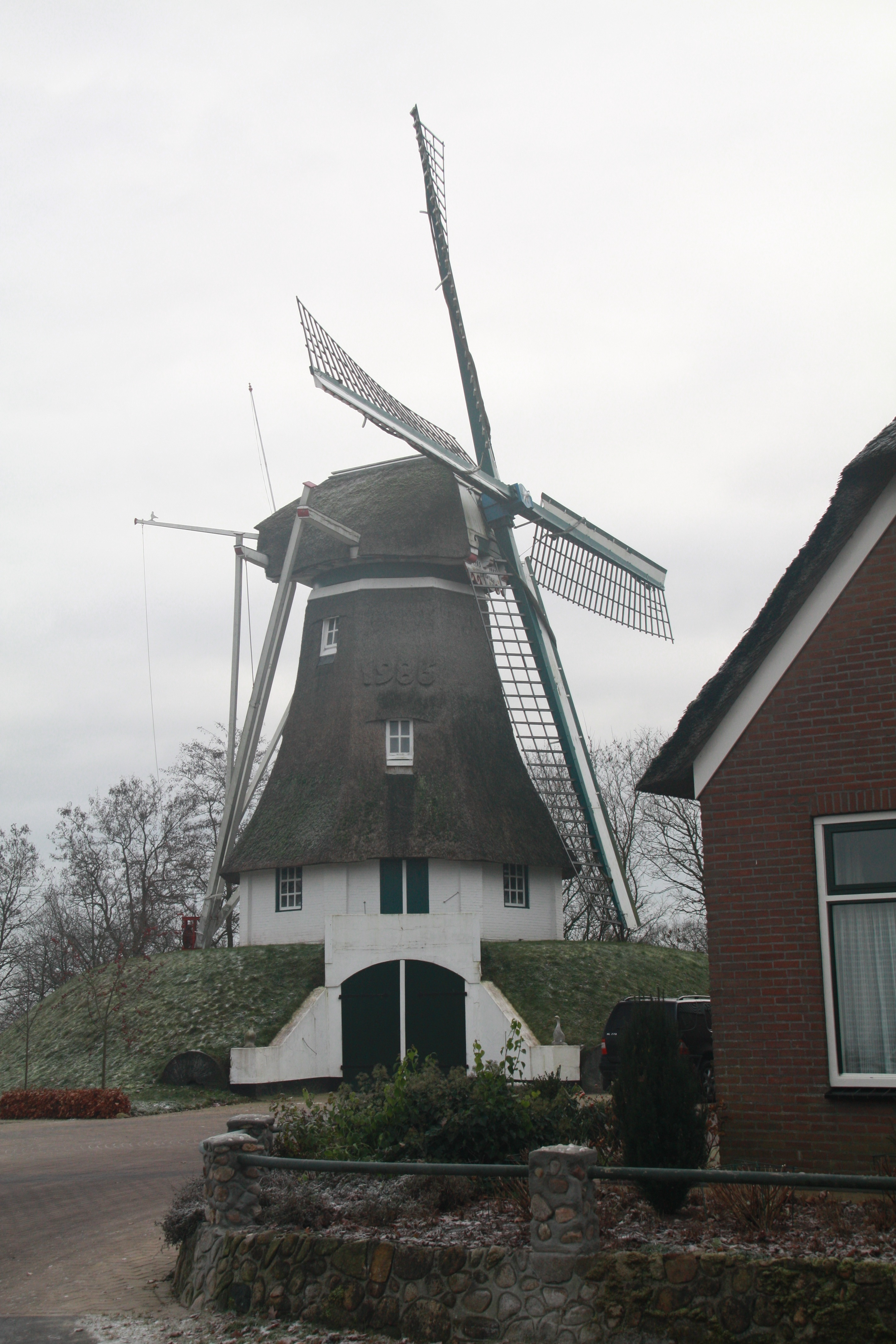
Windmill De Hondsrug
