= De Hondsrug, Weerdinge =

Smock mill in Drenthe, Netherlands

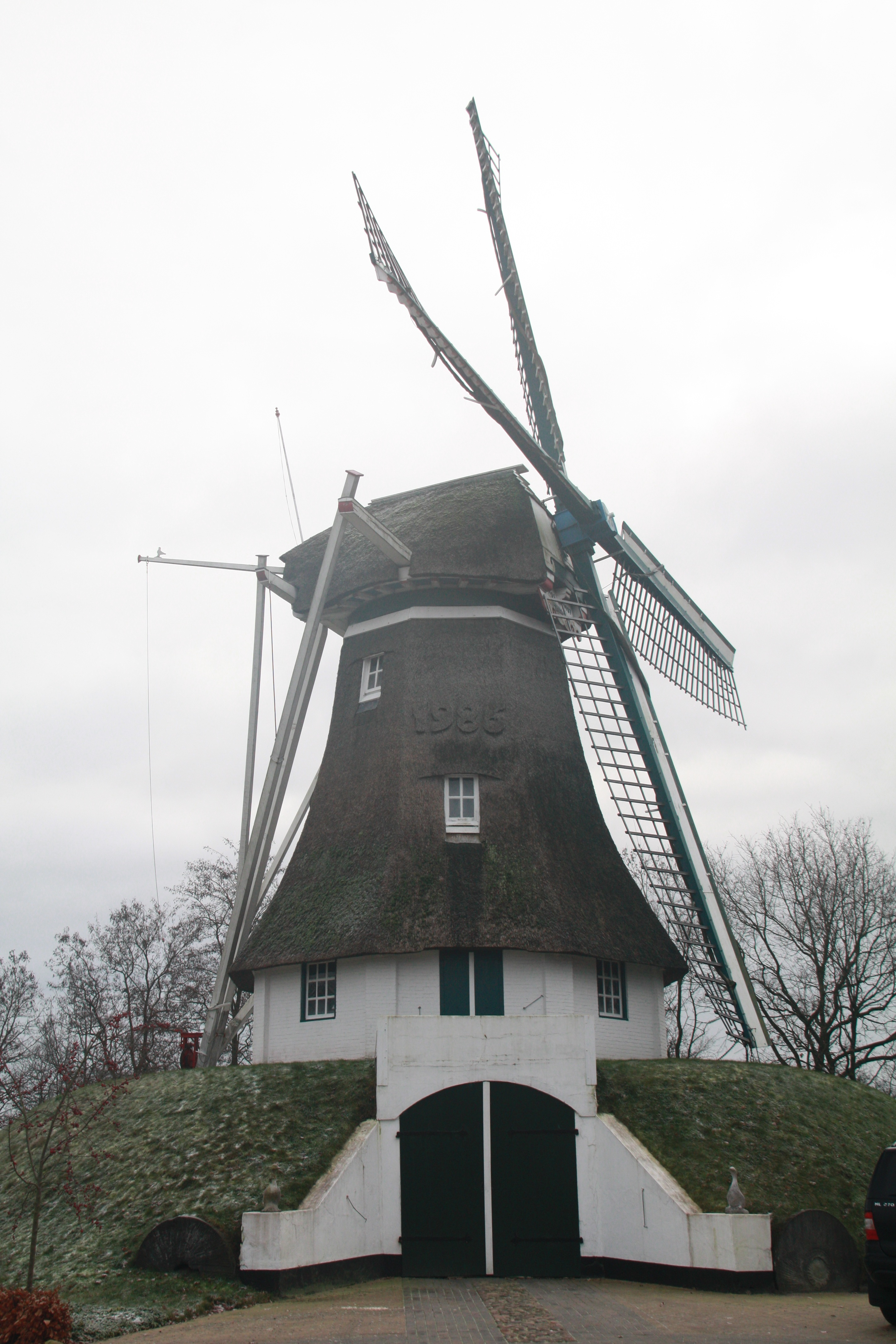
- De Hondsrug, January 2009

Origin
- Mill name: De Hondsrug
- Mill location: IJsspoorweg 33, 7814 XA Weerdinge
- Coordinates: 52°49′11″N 6°55′20″E
- Operator(s): Private
- Year built: 1910

Information
- Purpose: Corn mill
- Type: Smock mill
- Storeys: Two-storey smock
- Base storeys: Two-storey base
- Smock sides: Eight sides
- No. of sails: Four sails
- Type of sails: Common sails
- Windshaft: Cast iron
- Winding: Tailpole and winch
- No. of pairs of millstones: One pair
- Size of millstones: 1.50 metres (4 ft 11 in)

De Hondsrug is a smock mill in Weerdinge, Drenthe, which has been restored to working order. The mill was built in 1910 and is listed as a Rijksmonument, number 14964.

== History ==
The first windmill on this site was built in 1863. It ground buckwheat and rye. The mill burnt down on 4 June 1870. A new mill was built to replace it but was burnt down in 1909. To replace that mill, the drainage mill Flikkezijlsterpoldermolen was moved from Farmsum, Groningen by millwright Van Ausselt of Coevorden. Repairs were made to the mill in 1938 and the following year the sails were fitted with streamlined leading edges. In 1945, the mill lost a pair of sails and ceased work. It was restored in 1988. A new cap and sails were made and fitted, and the mill rethatched. The mill was then named De Hondsrug, having previously been nameless. It is named after a ridge of sandhills in Groningen.

== Description ==
De Hoop is what the Dutch describe as an "achtkante beltmolen". It is a two-storey smock mill on a two-storey brick base. There is no stage, a bank of earth thrown up against the lower storey of the base provides access to the sails. The smock and cap are thatched. The mill is winded by a tailpole and winch. The four Common sails have a span of 22.00 metres (72 ft 2 in) and are carried in a cast-iron windshaft which was cast by Prins van Oranje, The Hague in 1896. The windshaft also carries the brake wheel, which has 59 cogs. This drives the wallower (31 cogs) at the top of the upright shaft. At the bottom of the upright shaft, the great spur wheel, which has 108 cogs, drives the 1.50-metre-diameter (4.9 ft) French Burr stones via a lantern pinion stone nut with 33 staves.

== Public access ==
De Hondsrug is open to the public by appointment.
