= Ole Yde =

Danish fashion designer (born 1978)

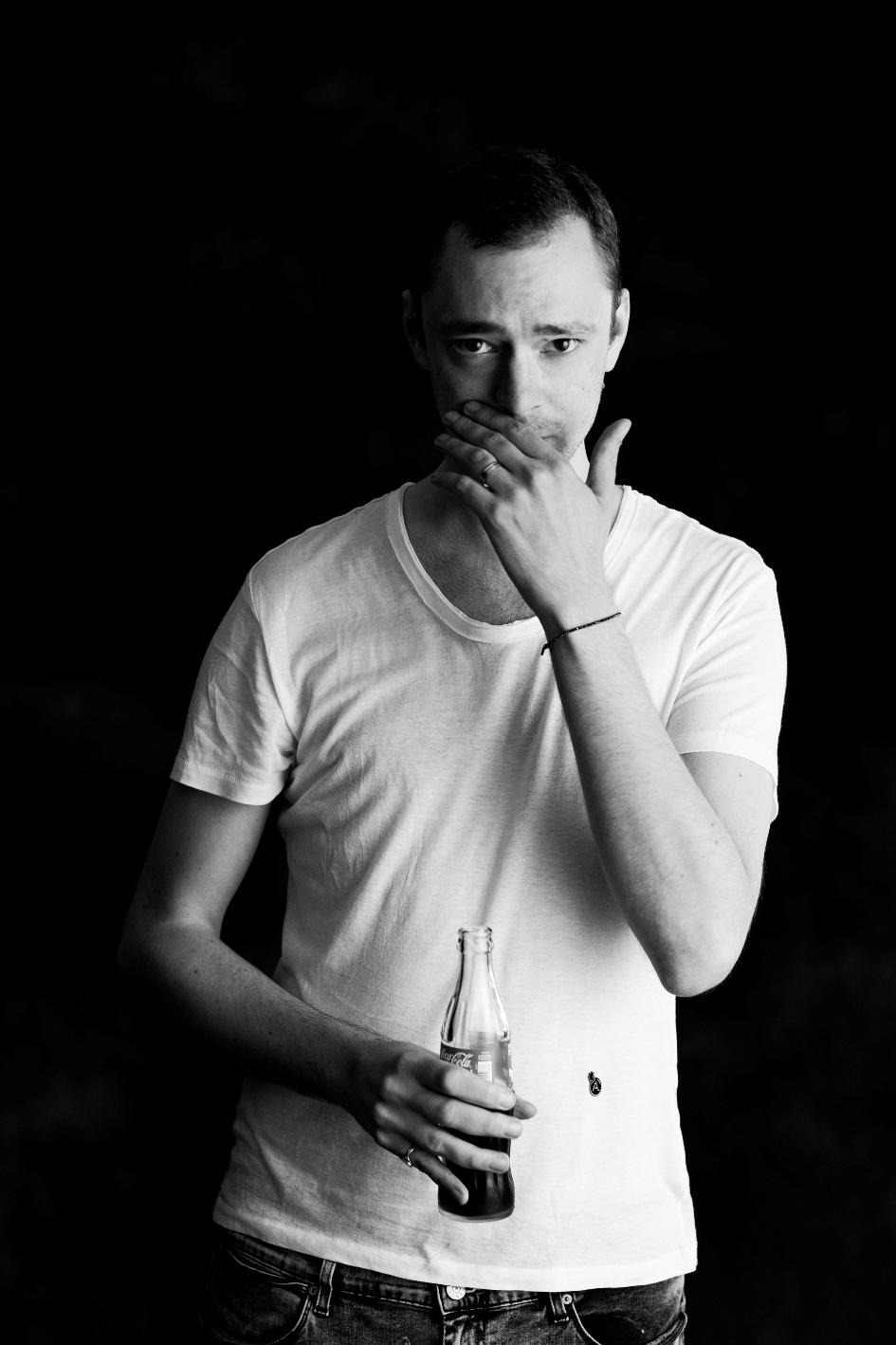
Ole Yde

Ole Yde (born 24 July 1978 in Odense) is a Danish fashion designer based in Copenhagen. He is the creative director and founder for the fashion house YDE, launched in 2005. YDE is a luxury women’s Prêt-à-Porter Brand based in Copenhagen.

== Early life ==
He was born on 24 July 1978 in Odense, Denmark. He moved to Copenhagen at the age of eighteen to attend the Royal Danish Academy of Fine Arts' Design School. In 2002, Yde left school short of graduating to pursue his dream of starting a label under his own name. He began his career by creating one of a kind dresses for private customers, which he still continues to do now.

== Fashion career ==
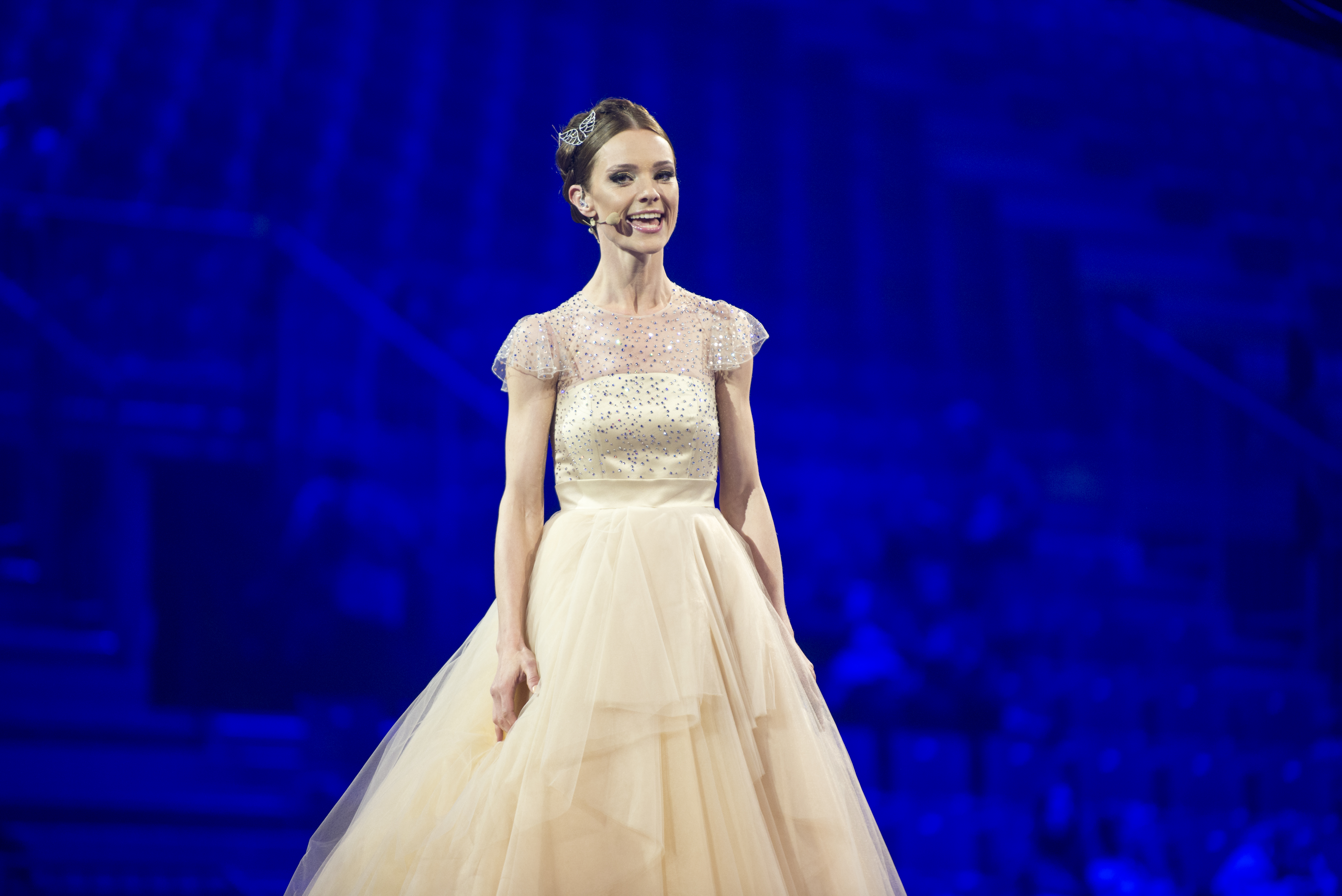
Lise Rønne in Ole Yde dress in Eurovision Song Contest 2014

YDE was launched in 2005 for which Ole subsequently won Illum’s best design prize. September 2009 marked the opening of the first YDE boutique in Copenhagen; it’s where the prêt a porter collection is being sold along with the made to order pieces that are created by the YDE atelier for high-profile clients. In 2010 Ole Yde won both the Silver Thread "Sølvtråden" awarded by Danish Magazine Alt for Damerne for new talent of the year and the GINEN award for designer of the year. Ole Yde wins designer of the year at ELLE Style Awards 2016.

== Inspiration ==
Ole Yde is often inspired by people or periods that have stood out in history because of their uniqueness, decadence or grandeur such as Maria Callas, Audrey Hepburn, Marie Antoinette and 18th Century French Art.

== Publications ==
YDE has been featured in numerous publications such as Vogue, Women's Wear Daily, Elle, Le Figaro, and The Mode, among others. Also, the designer has been mentioned in Dorothea Gundtoft's book "Fashion Scandinavia".

Ole Yde presents his collection twice a year during Copenhagen Fashion Week and Paris Fashion Week. In addition to the YDE’s flagship store in Copenhagen, the Prêt-à-Porter collection is available through a selection of retailers in North America, Middle East and Asia.

== Related Links ==
- YDE Official Website
