= Dorothea Gundtoft =

Danish stylist and author

Dorothea Gundtoft is a Danish writer, author, and stylist. She was born in Denmark and grew up in Marbella, Spain.

== Work ==
Dorothea Gundtoft's work as a writer and stylist has been featured in international magazines such as Vogue, Dazed & Confused, V Magazine & Vman, Style.com, Número and ELLE. Dorothea curated the largest Scandinavian fashion exhibition 'Fashion Scandinavia' at Somerset House during London Fashion Week 2013, collaborating with The British Fashion Council, The Royal Danish Embassy, The Swedish Export Ministry and The Royal Norwegian Embassy in London. Her work has been presented in TV, radio, and magazines such as; Harpers Bazaar, Vogue, BBC Live Broadcast, MTV, Danish National TV, Monocle Radio, Rolling Stone Magazine, Architectural Digest, Marie Claire, Irish Times, and The Daily Telegraph.

Gundtoft is also the author of two international books; New Nordic Design and Fashion Scandinavia, published by the leading art & design publisher Thames & Hudson, and distributed to highly acclaimed destinations such as Palais de Tokyo, MoMa, Louisiana Museum of Modern Art, Hay Stores, Foyles, Colette, Armani Book Store in Milano, Tokyo, and The Strand Book Store New York.

In May 2013 she was awarded the ELLE Style Award, and has been nominated twice again in 2014 and 2015, alongside receiving a 'New Generation Award' nomination by Vogue UK.

Dorothea began her career with an internship in New York at Vice Records, after living in Paris and London respectively, she moved to Copenhagen where she was employed at Cover Magazine for two years working as contributing fashion editor and stylist. She continued to work for Cover writing monthly articles from London, while creating fashion shoots. In London she worked freelance for American V Magazine taking backstage pictures each season in London and Paris. She has covered Copenhagen Fashion Week for Dazed & Confused Dazed Digital. She has been mentioned on Vogue.com as one from the "New Generation". In February 2013 she released her first book entitled Fashion Scandinavia, which was published by Thames & Hudson.
