= Yde Girl =

Iron Age bog body

- 1992 facial reconstruction by Richard Neave
- Died: 42 BCE – 59 CE; Near Yde, Drenthe, present-day Netherlands
- Cause of death: Probable strangulation
- Body discovered: 12 May 1897; Stijfveen peat bog near Yde, Drenthe, Netherlands; 53°05′49″N 6°35′06″E
- Known for: Iron Age bog body; forensic facial reconstruction

Yde Girl (English: /ˈɪdə/; Dutch: Meisje van Yde) is the well-preserved body of a teenage girl who died between 42 BCE and 59 CE and was discovered in 1897 in the Stijfveen peat bog near the village of Yde, Drenthe, in the present-day Netherlands. She is one of the best-known bog bodies from northwestern Europe and became internationally recognized following a forensic facial reconstruction created in 1992 by Richard Neave.

Although her remains were exceptionally well preserved when found, they were damaged during recovery and deteriorated before reaching the Drents Museum in Assen, where they remain today. Modern scientific study has shown that she was about 16 years old, had scoliosis and abnormalities affecting her right leg, and died from compression of the neck, probably after being deliberately killed. Whether she was executed, sacrificed, or died under other circumstances remains uncertain.

== Discovery ==
The body was discovered on 12 May 1897 in the Stijfveen bog between the villages of Yde and Vries in the province of Drenthe. While cutting peat, Hendrik Barkhof and Willem Emmens came across what looked like a piece of leather buried in the peat. When they looked closer, they realized it was preserved human skin and hair. Horrified, they covered the remains with peat sods and left the site. Three days later, a newspaper learned of the bog body and published the news.

On 21 May, just over a week later, the mayor of Vries contacted the Drents Museum in Assen and passed along a detailed description. He noted long hair, bluish peat stained skin, an open mouth with teeth visible, and an injury on the right cheek. The upper torso and shoulders lay tightly together, along with parts of both arms and one hand with all fingers. The feet were present, some with nails still attached. A femur and other bones lay loose beside them. A textile fragment lay nearby along with a long wool band wrapped several times around the neck.

Before museum staff arrived, the remains were exposed to air and handled by workers, which caused initial damage. Some parts had also been plundered, worsening the condition of the body. When museum director J. H. W. Joosting returned with officials, the thigh bone was missing, all but one of the teeth were gone, and much of the hair had either been pulled out or lost due to drying.

The remaining material was gathered into a crate and taken to the museum in Assen. An oak log found at the discovery site was left behind. When the remains arrived at the museum, the body and textiles were laid out to dry, which was a common practice in smaller institutions of the time.

Joosting proposed transferring the remains to the Rijksmuseum van Oudheden in Leiden for study, but the board of the Drents Museum blocked the request, as they wanted to display the body themselves. The Yde Girl was initially exhibited without further investigation.

== Condition and preservation ==
The remains show the kind of preservation often found in northern European peat bogs. Humic acids in the peat bonded with collagen in the skin, giving it a dark, toughened appearance, and the low-oxygen environment slowed normal decay. Once the body was exposed to air, the skin dried and tightened.

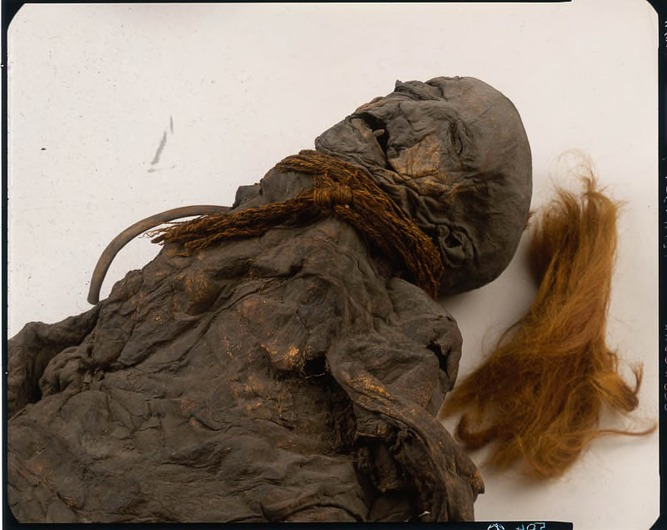
Head and trunk of Yde Girl

The upper torso and shoulders survived better than the lower body, pelvis, and abdomen. The hair measured about 21 centimetres (8.3 in). It had originally been blonde, but long contact with the peat changed it to a red-gold color. Most of the surviving hair lay on the left side of the scalp, while the right side was bare. Later examinations suggested that this pattern may have resulted from one side being exposed to air longer than the other, either before recovery or during drying after removal from the bog.

Most of the bones had softened or dissolved, as acidic peat water removes calcium. The bones that did survive showed a sideways curvature of the spine, an asymmetric pelvis, and a right leg that may have turned inward, features later confirmed by CT scan studies.

== Associated objects and clothing ==
Only a few items were found with the body, but the surviving textiles provide important information about clothing in the Iron Age Netherlands. The body had been wrapped in a wool cloak. When it was new, the cloak had been light in color and woven with several narrow stripes, likely created with plant-based dyes. The cloth showed many spinning and weaving faults, and it had been worn, torn, and repaired in several places, which suggests it had been used for a long time before it was placed in the bog. Today, the cloak survives in two main fragments.

A long wool band was found wrapped several times around the neck. It had originally been about 215 centimetres (85 in) to 220 centimetres (87 in) long and was made using the sprang technique, which produces an elastic fabric by interlinking warp threads. The band was woven with 37 warp threads, and about 125 centimetres (49 in) survive today.

No jewelry, metalwork, or personal items were recovered with the body. An oak log lay nearby, although its purpose is not known. Plant remains found at the discovery site, including sphagnum moss, heather, and other bog species, are typical of raised bog environments and help confirm that the body was placed on the bog surface rather than lost accidentally.

== Cause of death ==
The exact cause of Yde Girl's death cannot be determined with certainty, but the evidence indicates that she died from compression of the neck. A long woollen band was wrapped three times around her neck, with the knot positioned below her left ear. The way the band was wrapped and the position of the knot show that it had been tightened around her throat.

During examination, researchers identified a small stab wound below her left collarbone. Later analysis showed that the wound was not the cause of death. No injuries suggesting that she had tried to defend herself were found on the surviving hand. James M. Deem has suggested that this may indicate she was unconscious or otherwise unable to resist before the band was tightened, although this cannot be confirmed.

Researchers have interpreted the band around Yde Girl's neck as evidence that she was deliberately killed. Whether she was executed, sacrificed, or died under other circumstances remains unknown, and the available evidence does not permit a definitive conclusion.

== Scientific study ==
=== Overview ===
For almost a century after Yde Girl was discovered in 1897, she received little scientific study. Although her remains were described soon after recovery, they were dried, placed on display at the Drents Museum in Assen, and attracted little further investigation until advances in archaeological science during the late twentieth century made more detailed examination possible.

Beginning in 1992, Yde Girl was re-examined using modern techniques, including radiocarbon dating, computed tomography (CT) scanning, and forensic facial reconstruction.

=== Dating ===
Yde Girl lived around the transition from the Late Iron Age to the early Roman period in what is now the Netherlands. Radiocarbon dating places her death between 42 BCE and 59 CE, approximately 2,000 years ago.

In 2004, Dutch researchers Johannes van der Plicht, archaeologist Wijnand van der Sanden and their colleagues reported radiocarbon measurements from four samples: her skin, hair, woollen cloak and the woollen sprang band found around her neck. The samples were analysed using accelerator mass spectrometry (AMS), a technique that measures the remaining carbon-14 in organic material.

The researchers found that humic substances absorbed from the surrounding peat could produce artificially old dates. After chemical treatment to remove contaminants, the four accepted measurements produced a combined radiocarbon age of 1990 ± 20 years before present (BP), with "present" conventionally defined as 1950. Using the IntCal98 calibration curve, they estimated her death to between approximately 40 BCE and 50 CE.

In 2019, Dutch archaeologist Roy van Beek and colleagues recalibrated the four measurements using updated dating software and the IntCal13 calibration curve. Their analysis produced a revised range of 42 BCE to 59 CE, at 95.4% probability.

=== Body and health ===
She is estimated to have died at about 16 years of age and stood approximately 137 centimetres (4 ft 6 in) tall, making her considerably shorter than most adolescents of the period. Her hair was originally blonde but turned reddish after prolonged exposure to peat. One side of her scalp was long thought to have been deliberately shaved before death, but later comparisons with other bog bodies, particularly Windeby I, suggested that the uneven distribution of hair instead resulted from one side of her head being exposed to oxygen for longer after burial or during conservation.

=== Spine and mobility ===
Medical examination using X-rays and computed tomography (CT) revealed that Yde Girl had scoliosis, a sideways curvature of the spine. The condition appears to have affected the way she walked. Her right foot was slightly turned inward, and examination identified swelling of her right big toe and a hardened callus on her second toe. These findings suggest that she placed disproportionate weight on her right foot when walking. The curvature of her spine may also have caused asymmetry in her shoulders, hips and rib cage. Researchers have suggested that she walked with a limp, although the severity of any resulting mobility impairment remains uncertain.

=== Deposition ===
Mosses, sedges, and other bog plants found on Yde Girl and her clothing confirmed that she had been deposited in a raised peat bog. Pollen analysis suggested that she died during the growing season, while radiocarbon dating established a more precise date for her death.

== Exhibition ==
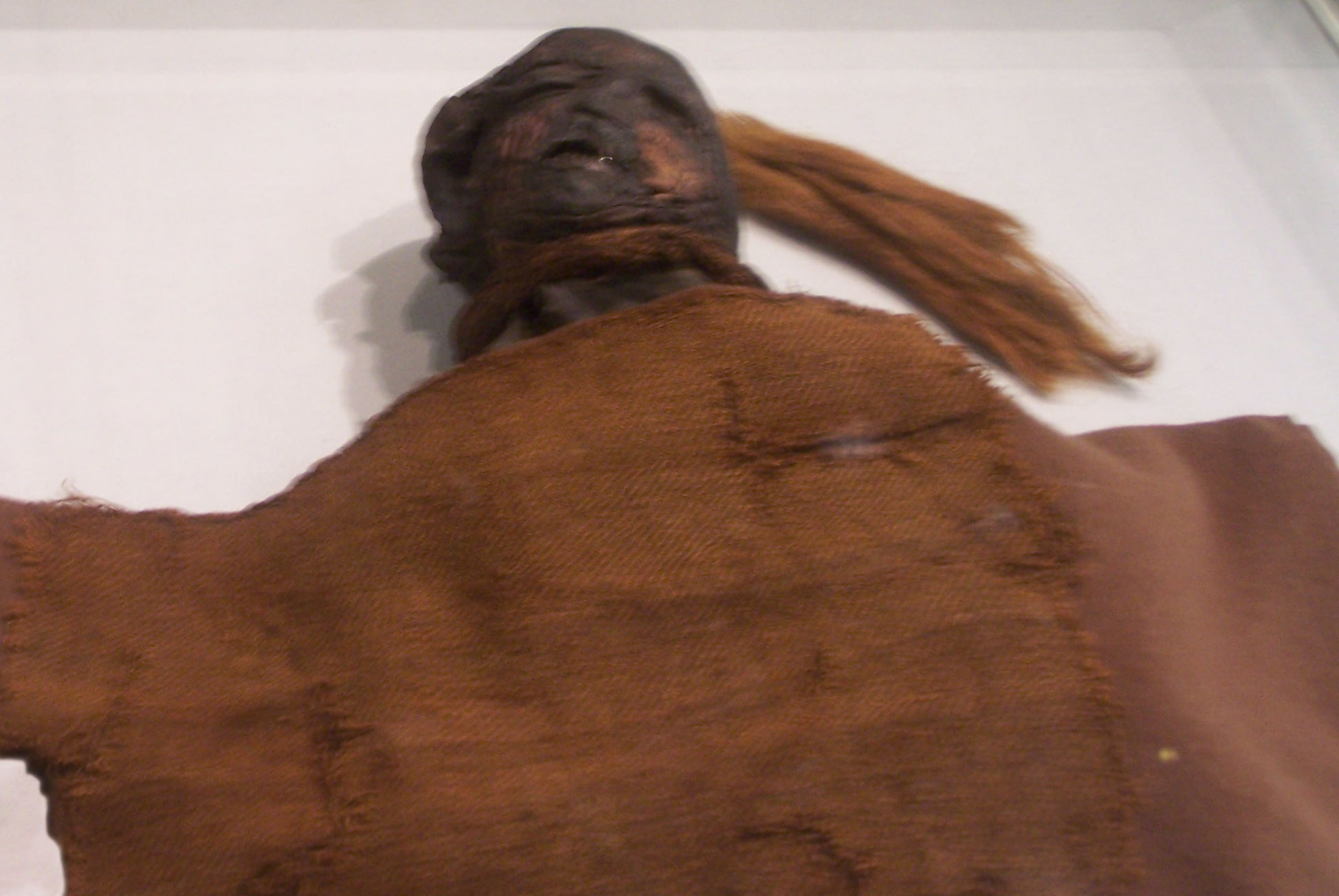
The Yde Girl's body

Yde Girl is held by the Drents Museum in Assen, in the northeastern Netherlands. She was transferred to the museum on 19 June 1897 and became the first bog body to enter its collection. The museum's archaeological collection also includes several other human remains recovered from the peatlands of Drenthe, including the Weerdinge Men, Exloërmond Man, Emmer-Erfscheidenveen Man, Aschbroeken Man and a surviving human arm found near Erica.

Yde Girl and other bog bodies from the museum's collection have been included in both temporary and travelling exhibitions. From 2020 to 2023, the Drents Museum presented several of its bog bodies together in Drentse veenlijken ("Bog Bodies of Drenthe"), an exhibition about the individuals, their lives and their deposition in the bogs. Yde Girl and the Weerdinge Men were also included in Mummies, an international exhibition of preserved human and animal remains that travelled outside the Netherlands.

Yde Girl is currently on permanent display at the Drents Museum in Labyrinthia, a fifteen-gallery presentation of the museum's archaeology, art and regional history collections.

== See also ==
- List of bog bodies
