= Richard Neave =

British expert in forensic facial reconstruction

Richard Neave (born c 1936) is a British expert in forensic facial reconstruction. Neave became an expert in anatomical art and was on the staff of the Unit of Art in Medicine at the University of Manchester.

He has used his skill in recreating faces from skulls in police forensic work and in producing images of historical figures. One of his reconstructions was of a bog body known as Yde Girl. In 1998, a murder investigation resulted in a successful prosecution as a result of Neave's work. Neave's archaeological reconstructions include Philip II of Macedon and Midas. In 2001, the television programme Son of God used one of three first-century Jewish skulls from a leading department of forensic science in Israel to depict Jesus in a new way. Neave constructed a face using forensic anthropology which suggested that Jesus would have had a broad face and large nose, and differed significantly from the traditional depictions of Jesus in Renaissance art.

== Notable works ==
- Jesus, founder of Christianity, c. 4 BCE
- Karen Price, Welsh murder victim (also known as "Little Miss Nobody")
- Lindow Man, bog body from England, c. 2 BCE
- Mary Rose skulls, c. 1545
- Nesyamun, Egyptian mummy, c. 1100 BCE
- King Midas, c. 2000 BCE
- Philip II of Macedon, c. 400 BCE
- Sensaos, Egyptian maiden c. 109 CE
- Yde Girl, bog body from the Netherlands, c. 54 BCE
