= Letter of Lentulus =

Apocryphal text purporting to describe Jesus

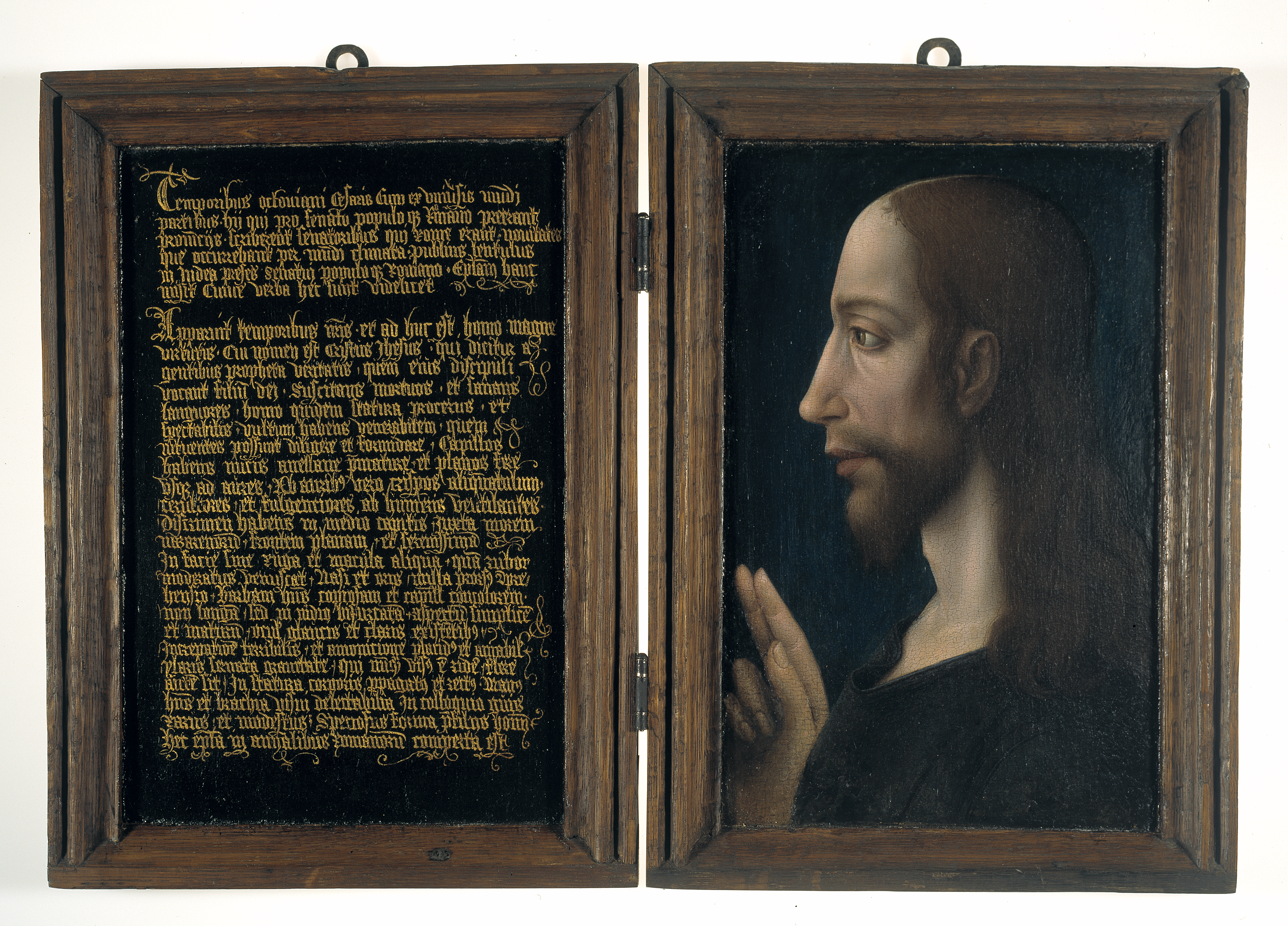
Diptych with the Letter of Lentulus and a portrait of Christ (Museum Catharijneconvent)

The Letter of Lentulus (/ˈlɛntjələs/) is an epistle of mysterious origin that was first widely published in Italy in the fifteenth century. It purports to be written by a Roman official, contemporary of Jesus, and gives a physical and personal description of Jesus. The letter may have influenced how Jesus was later physically depicted in art.

== Origin ==
It appears in several Florentine publications from around 1460 along with works of such humanists as Petrarch and Boccaccio. The letter was first printed in Germany in the "Life of Christ" by Ludolph the Carthusian (Cologne, 1474), and in the "Introduction to the works of St. Anselm" (Nuremberg, 1491). But it is neither the work of St. Anselm nor of Ludolph. According to the manuscript of Jena, a certain Giacomo of the Colonna family found the letter in 1421 in an ancient Roman document sent to Rome from Constantinople. It must have been of Greek origin, and translated into Latin during the thirteenth or fourteenth century, though it received its present form at the hands of a humanist of the fifteenth or sixteenth century. Christopher Mylius, the 18th-century librarian of Jena, stated the letter was written in golden letters on red paper and richly bound, but lost. In 1899, Ernst von Dobschütz listed over 75 historical manuscripts from Germany, France, and Italy, including the Letter of Lentulus in variant forms.

The 19th-century scholar Friedrich Münter believed he could trace the letter down to the time of Diocletian, but this is generally not accepted by present-day scholars.

The 1913 Catholic Encyclopedia regards the letter as apocryphal for several reasons:

- No Governor of Jerusalem or Procurator of Judea is known to have been called Lentulus, and a Roman governor would not have addressed the Senate in the way represented.
- The Roman writer cited the expressions "prophet of truth", "sons of men" and "Jesus Christ". The former two are Hebrew idioms, and the third is taken from the New Testament. The letter, therefore, gives a description of Jesus such as Christian piety conceived of him.

== 1680 English translation ==
The first English translation of the text appears in 1680 and lists the author as “Publius Lentulus”, a Prefect in Judea at the time of Tiberius Caesar.

== The letter ==
The purported letter reads, in translation:

Lentulus, the Governor of the Jerusalemites to the Roman Senate and People, greetings. There has appeared in our times, and there still lives, a man of great power (virtue), called Jesus Christ. The people call him prophet of truth; his disciples, son of God. He raises the dead, and heals infirmities. He is a man of medium size (statura procerus, mediocris et spectabilis); he has a venerable aspect, and his beholders can both fear and love him. His hair is of the colour of the ripe hazel-nut, straight down to the ears, but below the ears wavy and curled, with a bluish and bright reflection, flowing over his shoulders. It is parted in two on the top of the head, after the pattern of the Nazarenes. His brow is smooth and very cheerful with a face without wrinkle or spot, embellished by a slightly reddish complexion. His nose and mouth are faultless. His beard is abundant, of the colour of his hair, not long, but divided at the chin. His aspect is simple and mature, his eyes are blue-gray and bright. He is terrible in his reprimands, sweet and amiable in his admonitions, cheerful without loss of gravity. He was never known to laugh, but often to weep. His stature is straight, his hands and arms beautiful to behold. His conversation is grave, infrequent, and modest. He is the most beautiful among the children of men.

The description agrees with the so-called Abgar description of Jesus as well as the description of Jesus given by Nicephorus Callistus, St. John Damascene, and the Book of Painters (of Mount Athos).

Ernst von Dobschütz enumerates the different manuscripts which vary from the foregoing text in several details, and gives an apparatus criticus.

== Effects ==
The letter saw widespread publication and was taken as an eyewitness account for a long time. It also gave various artists, such as Dirk Bouts, a model on which to base the face and appearance of Jesus Christ.
