= Drents Museum =

History museum in the Netherlands

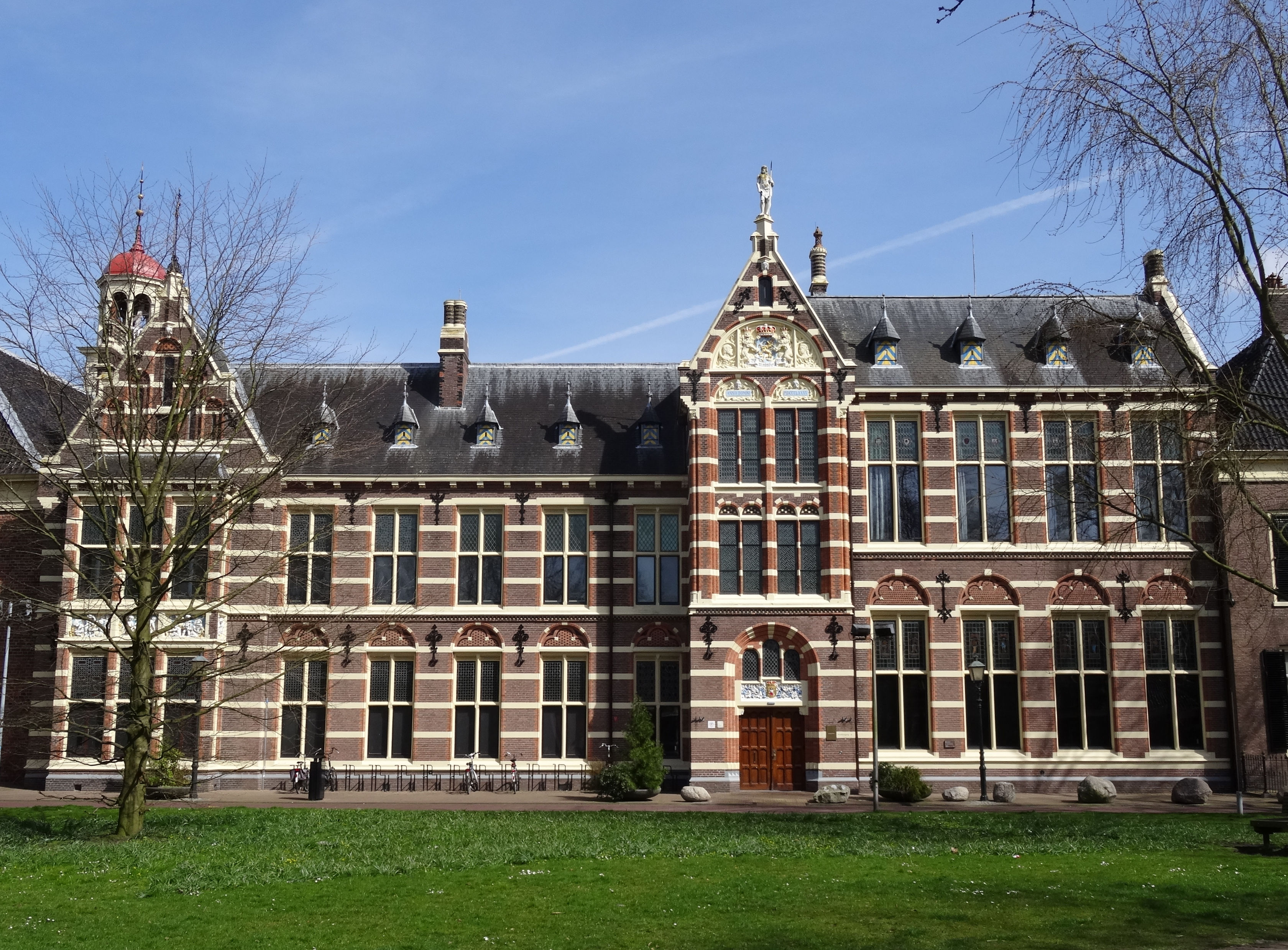
- The main building of the Drents Museum
- Established: 28 November 1854; 171 years ago
- Location: Assen, Drenthe, Netherlands
- Coordinates: 52°59′36″N 6°33′51″E
- Type: Art museum; history museum
- Visitors: 227,000 (2013)
- Director: Robert van Langh
- Curator: Annemiek Rens
- Website: drentsmuseum.nl

The Drents Museum (Dutch pronunciation: [ˈdrɛnts myˈzeːjʏm]) is an art and history museum in Assen, Drenthe, the Netherlands. Opened in 1854, it has a collection of prehistoric artifacts, applied art and visual art, as well as temporary exhibitions. In 2023, it had 179,345 visitors.

== History ==
The museum was founded by the King's Commissioner of Drenthe on 28 November 1854 as the Provincial Museum of Drents Antiquities.

On 6 November 2007, the museum announced that architect Erick van Egeraat was chosen to design a new extension for the museum. Total costs were estimated at eighteen million euros. The museum was closed from the summer of 2010 to the summer of 2011. At the beginning of 2010, a new modern depot facility for approximately 90,000 objects and works of art was completed. The new wing was opened officially in November 2011.

The museum conducted a CT scan and endoscopy of a statue of Buddha that documented the presence of a mummy identified as that of a monk, Liuquan, a Buddhist master of the Chinese Medical School. The statue is reported to date to the 11th or 12th century. The mummy was put on display at the Hungarian Natural History Museum through May 2015.

=== 2025 heist ===
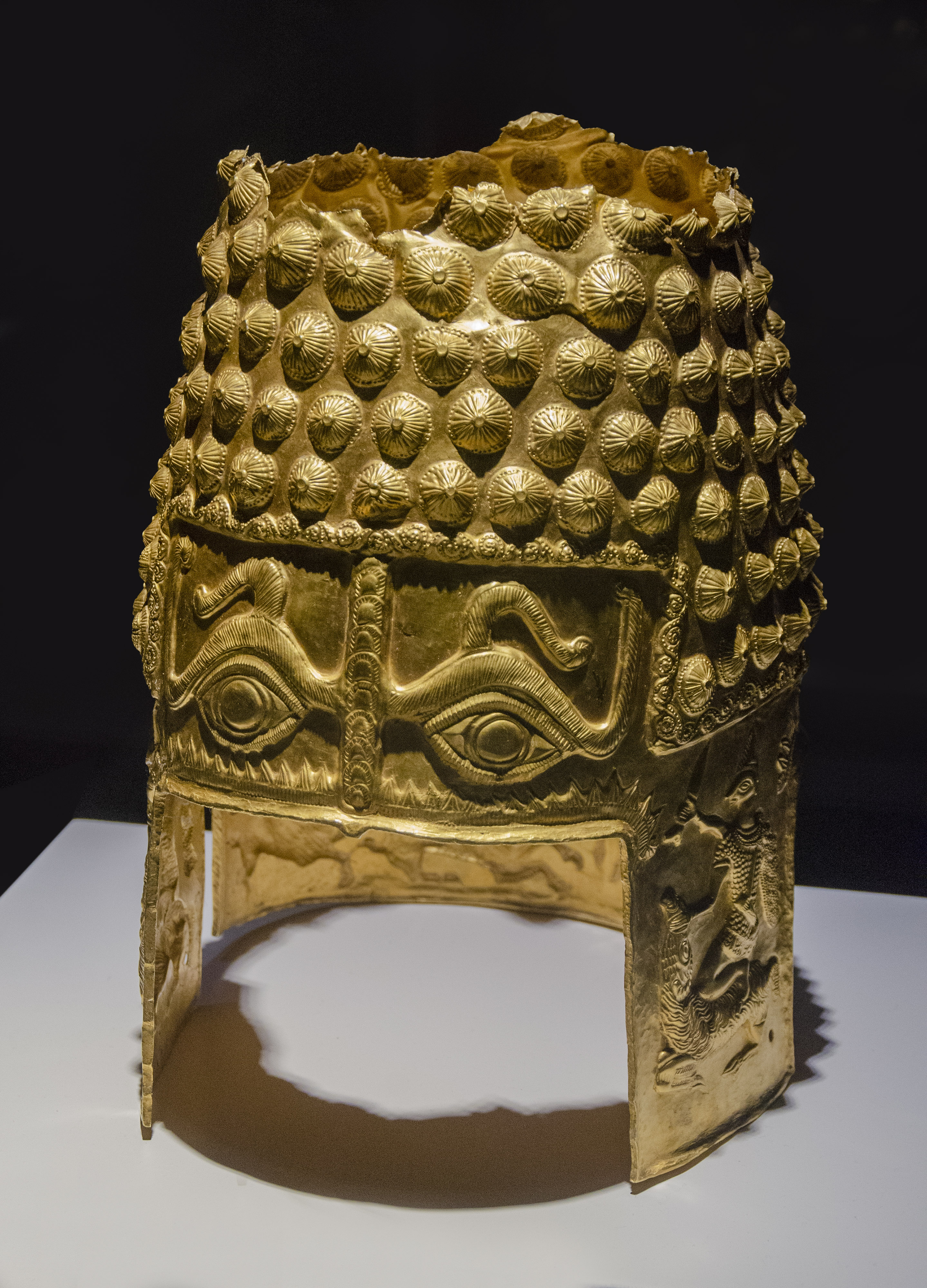
The Helmet of Coțofenești, one of the artifacts which was stolen

On 25 January 2025, a heist occurred at the museum, with thieves stealing gold artifacts from the museum. The thieves broke into the museum with explosives. The stolen artifacts included the 5th-century BCE Helmet of Coțofenești and three Dacian bracelets. Police were alerted following reports of an explosion at 3:45 a.m. local time on the same day. There was no guard in the museum at the time of the heist.

On 2 April 2026 it was announced that the helmet and two of the three bracelets had been recovered. On 5 June 2026, the Northern Netherlands District Court sentenced three people to 47 months' imprisonment for the heist.

== Collection ==
The museum has a large permanent collection of prehistoric artifacts from the province of Drenthe. It includes exhibits of bog bodies such as the Yde Girl, the Weerdinge Men, Exloërmond Man, and the Emmer-Erscheidenveen Man. There are finds from the Funnelbeaker culture, and the collection also includes the oldest recovered canoe in the world, the Pesse canoe, that dates between 8200 and 7600 BC.

An annex building has period rooms demonstrating the lifestyle of well-to-do Drenthe families from various time periods. This building also houses ceramics from the House of Orange, known as the collection Bontekoe. In the garden stands a statue of Bartje Bartels, the main character of books by Anne de Vries, and a symbol of the province of Drenthe.

The museum holds a permanent collection of figurative art with particular attention to Realism from northern Europe and representatives of the fourth generation of Dutch abstract figurative artists such as Matthijs Röling. There also is a collection of art and applied art from 1885 to 1935 with work by Vincent van Gogh, Jan Toorop, and Jan Sluijters.

== Administration ==
Robert van Langh is the current museum director. He started in 2025, replacing Harry Tupan, who had the job since 2017. Annemiek Rens is the chief curator.

In 2013, the museum had 227,000 visitors. In 2023, it had 179,345 visitors. In that same year, there was 81 staff taking around 57 full-time positions.
