= Cashel Man =

Bog body from Ireland

- Died: c. 2141-1960 BCE; Cashel Bog, County Laois, Ireland
- Resting place: National Museum of Ireland - Archaeology, Dublin
- Known for: Early Bronze Age bog body

Cashel Man is the preserved remains of a young adult male discovered in 2011 in Cashel Bog, near Cashel in County Laois, Ireland. Radiocarbon dating places his death between 2141 and 1960 BCE, during the Early Bronze Age. The exceptionally early date makes Cashel Man one of the oldest bog bodies known from Europe and the earliest discovered in Ireland with preserved soft tissue.

Osteological analysis identified the individual as a male aged approximately 20 to 25 years at the time of death. Fragments of the head preserved closely cut hair, indicating that his hair was short when he died. The body was discovered by Jason Phelan during peat milling and was partially damaged by harvesting machinery before archaeologists from the National Museum of Ireland recovered the remains and documented the find site.

The man had been placed in the bog in a tightly crouched position, with his legs drawn to his chest and his arms wrapped around them. Wooden hazel rods found nearby and evidence of violent injury have led some researchers to suggest that his death may have been a deliberate killing connected with ritual activity in wetlands during the Bronze Age.

== Discovery ==
Cashel Man is the name given to the preserved remains of a young adult male uncovered on 10 August 2011 during peat milling in Cashel Bog between Portlaoise and Abbeyleix.

Bord na Móna worker Jason Phelan was guiding a milling machine across the bog when he spotted a sharp, triangular object rising from the peat. When he tried to move it aside, two human legs lifted with it. He stopped the machine immediately.

Staff from the National Museum of Ireland arrived soon after, along with pathologist Marie Cassidy. They confirmed the chest area had been sliced by the machinery and that centuries of peat pressure had flattened and distorted the remains.

Two hazel rods were recovered near the body. Their placement suggested his death or burial may have involved ritual practice rather than a simple disposal.

Archaeologists and conservators from the National Museum spent four days documenting the site. By then, at least two metres of peat had already been removed by milling, leaving the body exposed near the centre of the bog. The man was unclothed and oriented north to south with the head end toward the south.

== Condition and preservation ==
Cashel Man is the earliest known bog body from Ireland with preserved flesh and one of the oldest known examples in Europe. Although his body was badly damaged during modern peat harvesting, substantial areas of skin and other soft tissue survived.

The peat-milling machine that uncovered Cashel Man severed his head, neck and left arm from the body. Parts displaced by the machine were later recovered from the milled peat, including portions of his mandible and teeth, ribs, clavicle, vertebrae, skin and closely-cut hair.

The weight of the peat above Cashel Man compressed and distorted his body after death. Despite this distortion, examination established that he had been lying on his right side with his legs tightly flexed.

Preservation varied considerably across the body. His legs were exceptionally well preserved and protruded from the surviving skin, while much of the tissue within the rest of the body had decomposed.

The preservation of Cashel Man's soft tissue resulted from the waterlogged, acidic and low-oxygen conditions within the bog. These conditions inhibit organisms involved in decomposition, allowing skin and other organic material to survive for thousands of years.

== Scientific study ==
Following his discovery on 10 August 2011, Cashel Man underwent scientific examination at the National Museum of Ireland – Archaeology. Specialists used osteological analysis, radiocarbon dating, forensic pathology, and computed tomography (CT) imaging to establish his biological profile, date of death, body position, and injuries.

=== Body and health ===
Cashel Man was a young adult male, estimated from examination of his spine to have been about 20 to 25 years old when he died. Parts of his head recovered from the milled peat included his face and scalp, which retained short-cropped hair, as well as portions of his lower jaw and teeth.

The research team used computed tomography to examine Cashel Man's skeleton and surviving soft tissue. State Pathologist Marie Cassidy also examined his internal organs in an attempt to locate his stomach and investigate his last meal. The stomach had completely decomposed and could not be examined.

The CT scans revealed a fracture of Cashel Man's right forearm that showed no signs of healing. One of the two forearm bones, on the side leading towards the little finger, had been broken in two. Cassidy concluded that the injury had occurred at or around the time of his death.

The scans also showed severe displacement of Cashel Man's vertebrae in two places. The damage was initially considered possible evidence of major trauma to the spine. Forensic anthropologist Niels Lynnerup, who had previously studied other bog bodies, concluded that the spinal displacement most likely occurred after death. He attributed it to acidic conditions in the bog softening the tissues that held the spine together, followed by pressure from the accumulating peat pushing the vertebrae out of alignment. The National Museum of Ireland subsequently revised its earlier interpretation of a broken spine, attributing the apparent injury to natural compression in the bog and damage caused by the peat-milling machine.

=== Dating ===
Radiocarbon dating established that Cashel Man died between 2141 and 1960 BCE during the Early Bronze Age. He lived nearly two millennia before the Iron Age bog bodies Old Croghan Man and Clonycavan Man, making him one of the oldest known bog bodies in Europe and the earliest discovered in Ireland with preserved soft tissue.

== Deposition ==
Cashel Man was found unclothed, lying on his right side with his knees drawn up tightly. His body was aligned north–south, with his head towards the south. According to the National Museum of Ireland, he appears to have been placed on the surface of the bog, possibly in a pool.

Two hazel rods marked the spot. Archaeologist Eamonn Kelly, then Keeper of Antiquities at the National Museum of Ireland, suggested that they would have crossed above the man's head and may have been used either to hold his body down or to mark its location. Radiocarbon dating placed one rod between 2033 and 1888 BCE, overlapping the body's date of 2141–1960 BCE. Both date to the Early Bronze Age, around 4,000 years ago.

The deposition site lay on the boundary of Fearann Ua Leathlobhair, a territory in County Laois, Ireland. Within this territory was Crosy Duff Hill, also called Cros Dubh, which the museum identifies as a probable place where the regional kings of Laois formally took office. The museum compares this setting with that of Old Croghan Man, an Iron Age bog body found on a territorial boundary near Croghan Hill, where the kings of Offaly took office. It connects these similarities with the theory that such deposits were part of rituals concerning kingship and a ruler's authority over the land.

== Death and interpretation ==
Cashel Man had once lived in what was a flourishing community. During this time, Ireland was entering the Bronze Age, when settled farming communities and emerging metalworking traditions coexisted with expanding ritual practices in wetlands, making bogs significant places for symbolic deposits and unusual burials like Cashel Man.

Cashel Man suffered a violent death during the Early Bronze Age. Before he died, his left arm was broken by a blow from a sharp object, although researchers have suggested that the weapon may have been slightly blunter, such as a primitive axe. The injury may have been a defensive wound sustained while he was trying to protect himself. His back was also broken in two places, although these fractures are thought to have occurred after his death. Unlike the other injuries, a cut on his back was likely caused by the peat harvester that uncovered the body.

Kelly proposed Cashel Man may have been a local king who was ritually killed after failing to ensure the prosperity of his people, as early Irish tradition held kings responsible for the fertility of the land and the success of harvests. Kelly also noted that Cashel Man was buried near a prominent hill that may have been used for kingship inauguration ceremonies, similar to the later Irish bog bodies Old Croghan Man and Clonycavan Man, although Cashel Man lived nearly two millennia earlier.

Kelly argued that these similarities in injuries, burial and surrounding landscapes may point to a much older ritual tradition. Because this explanation is based on archaeological patterns rather than direct evidence, the kingship hypothesis remains unproven.

== See also ==
- List of bog bodies from Ireland
