= List of volcanoes in the Republic of Ireland =

Ireland has no active volcanoes. Volcanic activity in the country occurred primarily between 480–430 mya (million years ago), during the Ordovician geological age.

== List ==
Name	Elevation		Location		Last eruption
Name	metres	feet	Coordinates	County	Last eruption
Bennaunmore	454	1490	52°0′31″N 9°25′9″W	Kerry	+358 mya
Bohaun	-	-	53°42′00″N 9°24′00″W	Mayo	-
Cnoc An Duin	67	220	53°24′54″N 10°06′55″W	Galway	+58 mya
Croghan Hill	234	768	53°20′48″N 7°16′39″W	Offaly	±350 mya
Horses Glen	-	-	51.973562°N 9.471339°W	Kerry	+358 mya
Killeen	-	-		Kerry	+358 mya
Lambay Island	-	-	53°29′16″N 6°01′10″W	Dublin	-
Limerick volcanic basin	220	782	52°31′23″N 8°24′14″W	Limerick	-
Loch Na Fooey	25	82	53°34′40″N 9°32′53″W	Galway	±490 mya
Vinegar Hill	122	400	52.502064°N 6.565876°W	Wexford	-
Westmeath-Offaly volcano	-	-	53°24′58″N 7°17′46″W	Offaly and Westmeath	±330 mya
