= Gallagh Man =

Iron Age bog body found in Ireland

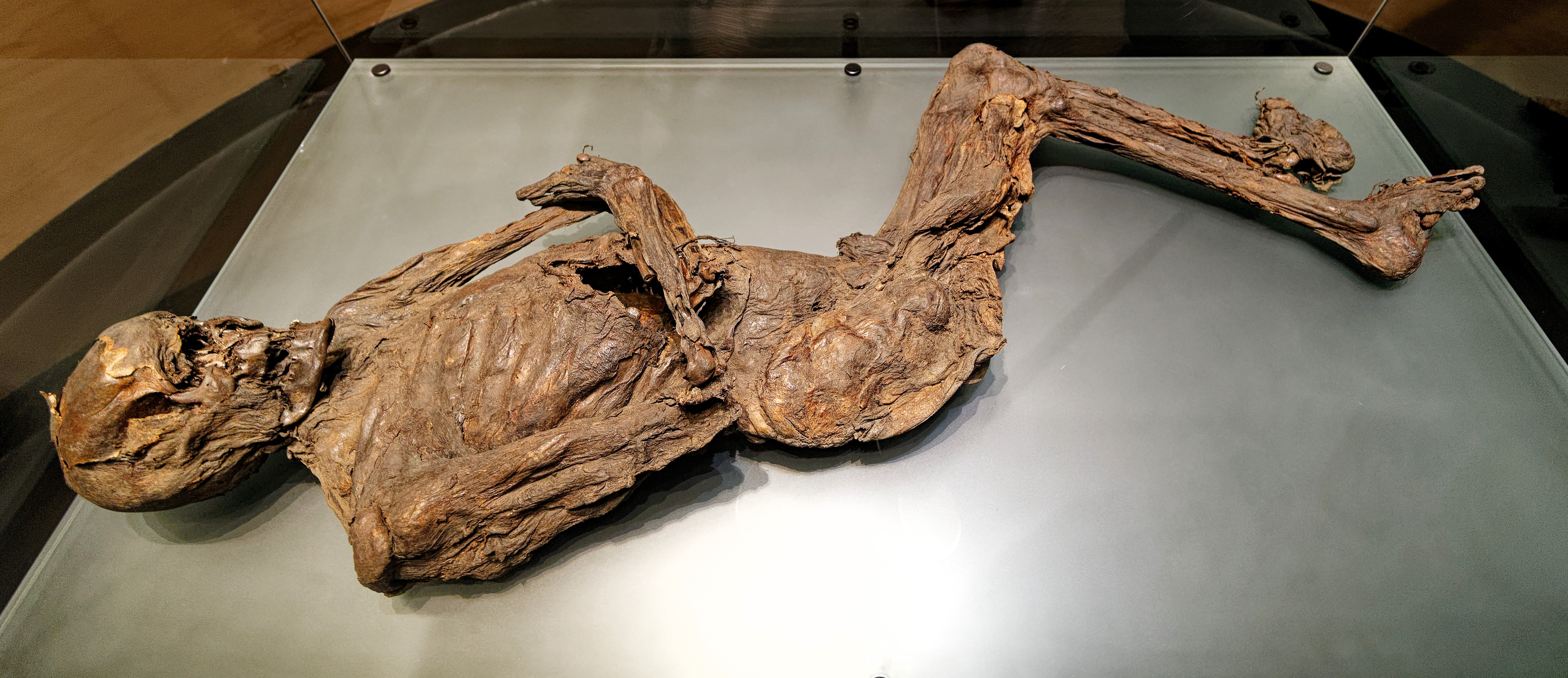
- Gallagh Man
- Died: c. 400–200 BC; Gallagh bog, near Castleblakeney, County Galway, Ireland
- Body discovered: 1821
- Resting place: National Museum of Ireland, Dublin
- Known for: Iron Age bog body

Gallagh Man is the name given to a preserved Iron Age bog body found in County Galway, Ireland, in 1821. The remains date to c. 470–120 BC, and are of a six-foot (1.8 m) tall, healthy male with dark and reddish hair, who is estimated to have been about 25 years old at the time of death. The presence of a withy hoop – rope made from twisted willow twigs – found wrapped around his throat indicates that he was strangled during a ritual killing or executed as a criminal.

Gallagh Man was found buried in a ten-foot (3.0 m) deep grave in a peat bog, dressed in a long leather mantle, and pinned down by two long wooden stakes. His teeth and hair were almost fully preserved, and even though the body is severely dehydrated and thus shrivelled, it has suffered from little shrinkage and is overall exceptionally well-preserved.

== Discovery ==
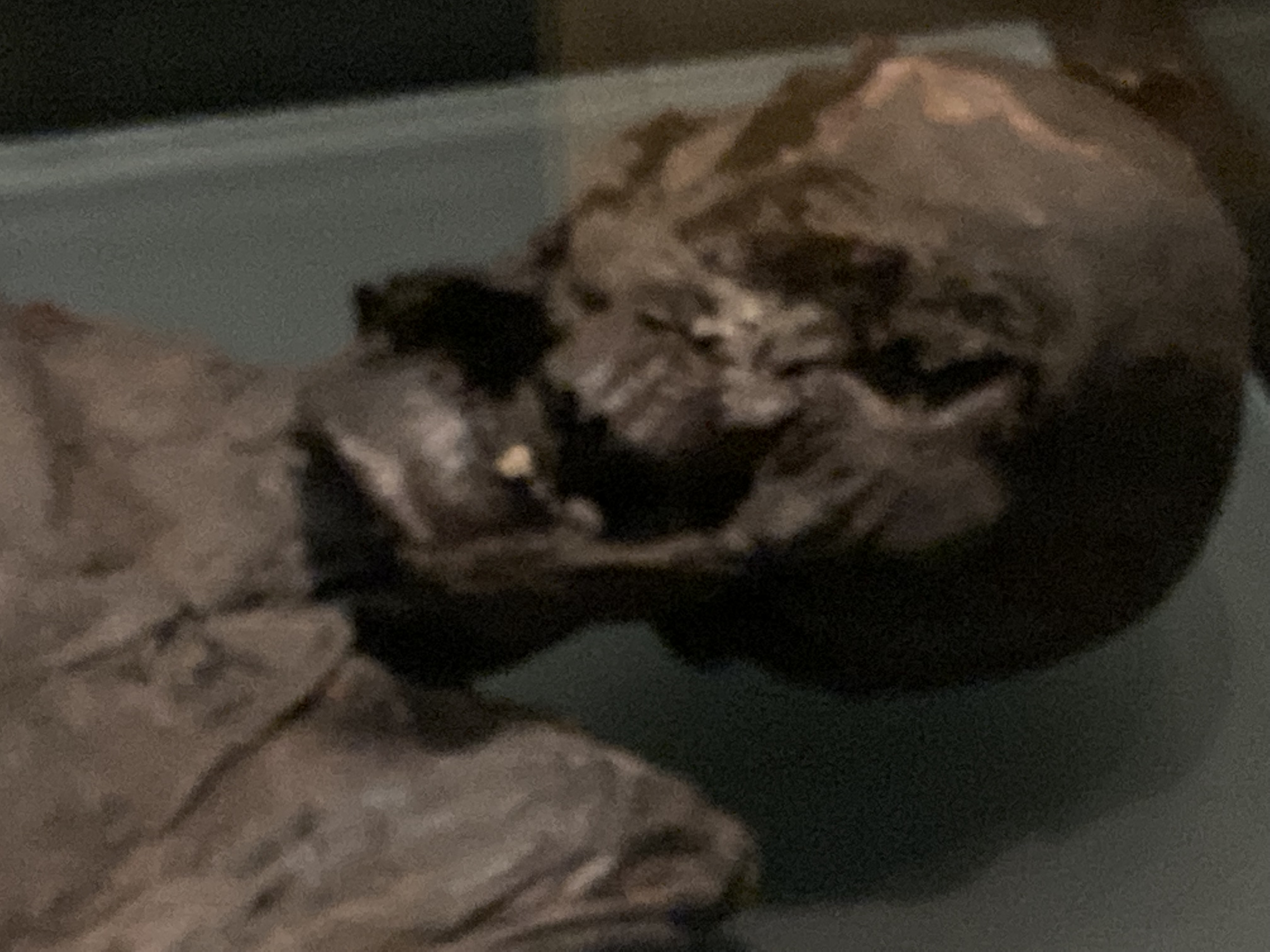
Detail of Gallagh Man's preserved head and facial features

The individual now known as Gallagh Man was discovered in 1821 by labourers cutting peat on land belonging to the O'Kelly family at Gallagh, a townland near Castleblakeney, County Galway, Ireland. The precise location of the grave was not recorded.

The body lay approximately 3 metres (10 ft) below the surface of the bog. Two long, pointed wooden stakes had been driven into the peat over the remains, holding the body down. A withy hoop made from twisted willow was found around his neck, and a deerskin mantle was associated with the burial.

Archaeologist Eamonn P. Kelly has placed the probable find area near the boundaries of a townland, civil parish and barony. Kelly notes that this location also corresponded with the medieval boundary of the Uí Maine kingdom, ruled by the O'Kelly (Ó Ceallaigh) dynasty.

== Condition and preservation ==
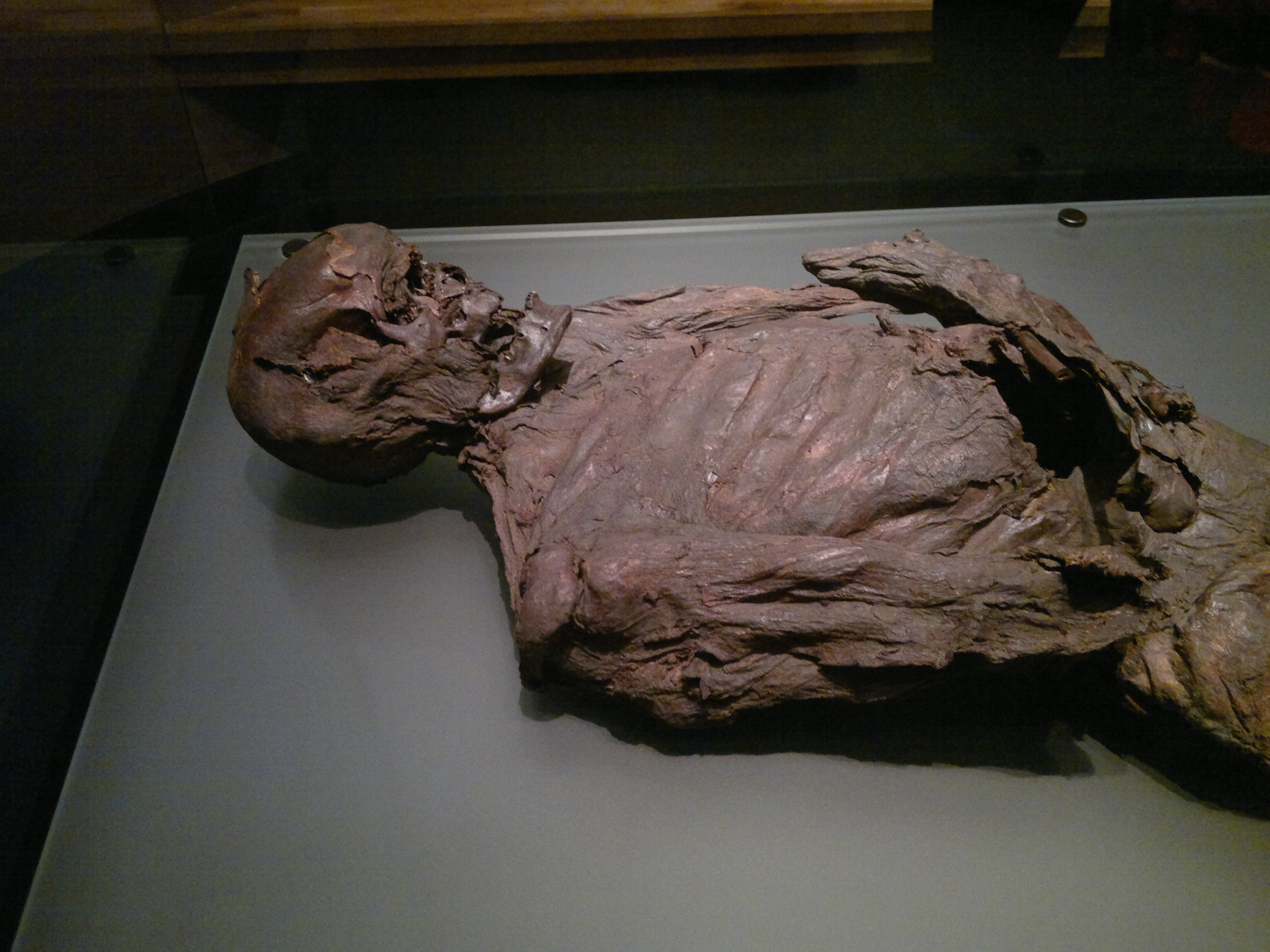
Close view of head and torso

After his discovery in 1821, Gallagh Man soon became a local curiosity. Over the following eight years, the O'Kelly family periodically exhumed the body to display him to paying visitors before reburying him in the bog. This repeated handling damaged parts of the remains and associated artefacts.

Gallagh Man nevertheless retains much of his original height and bodily proportions, although the remains became dehydrated and shrivelled after their removal from the bog. His teeth, long dark reddish-brown hair and beard are also preserved.

== Clothing and associated items ==
Early nineteenth-century descriptions record Gallagh Man as partly clothed rather than naked. In an account published by Jonathan Binns, quoting Irish antiquarian George Petrie, the head, lower legs and feet were uncovered, while an animal-skin garment covered the torso and limbs to approximately the knees and elbows. The garment was fastened at the front with thongs cut from the same material and worn with the hairy surface against the body. Petrie suggested that the hide might have come from a large deer, although the species was not established. He also recorded that the garment survived after the body began to shrink following its removal from the bog.

A later nineteenth-century description by Irish antiquarian William Gregory Wood-Martin identified the garment as a deerskin tunic reaching to the knees and halfway down the arms. The garment had been badly damaged when the body was disinterred, but fragments and portions of its seams survived. The pieces of hide had been sewn together with fine gut made from three strands. Wood-Martin described the stitches as closely and regularly spaced, with each individually knotted. The seam used a looped stitch similar to a buttonhole stitch, which reduced the likelihood that the stitching would unravel. Surviving fragments of the garment are held by the National Museum of Ireland.

Later descriptions differ over the garment's form and some of the materials associated with it. Irish archaeologist Raghnall Ó Floinn described Gallagh Man as otherwise naked but wearing a leather cape gathered at the neck with a band of sally, or willow, rods. Museum notes cited by archaeologist Miranda Aldhouse-Green instead describe a close-fitting, knee-length deerskin tunic and a woven hazel band around the neck. The Archaeological Institute of America similarly describes a knee-length deerskin cape and a willow neck band. Archaeologist Leila Joensson notes the disagreement in the published accounts over whether the garment was a cape or tunic and whether the neck band was made from willow or hazel.

Two long wooden objects were also found, one on either side of the body. Later archaeological accounts describe them as pointed stakes placed beside Gallagh Man, while Petrie's nineteenth-century account describes them as long staffs or poles and records a contemporary suggestion that they might have been used for crossing streams. Petrie also stated that no weapon was found with the body.

== Scientific analysis ==
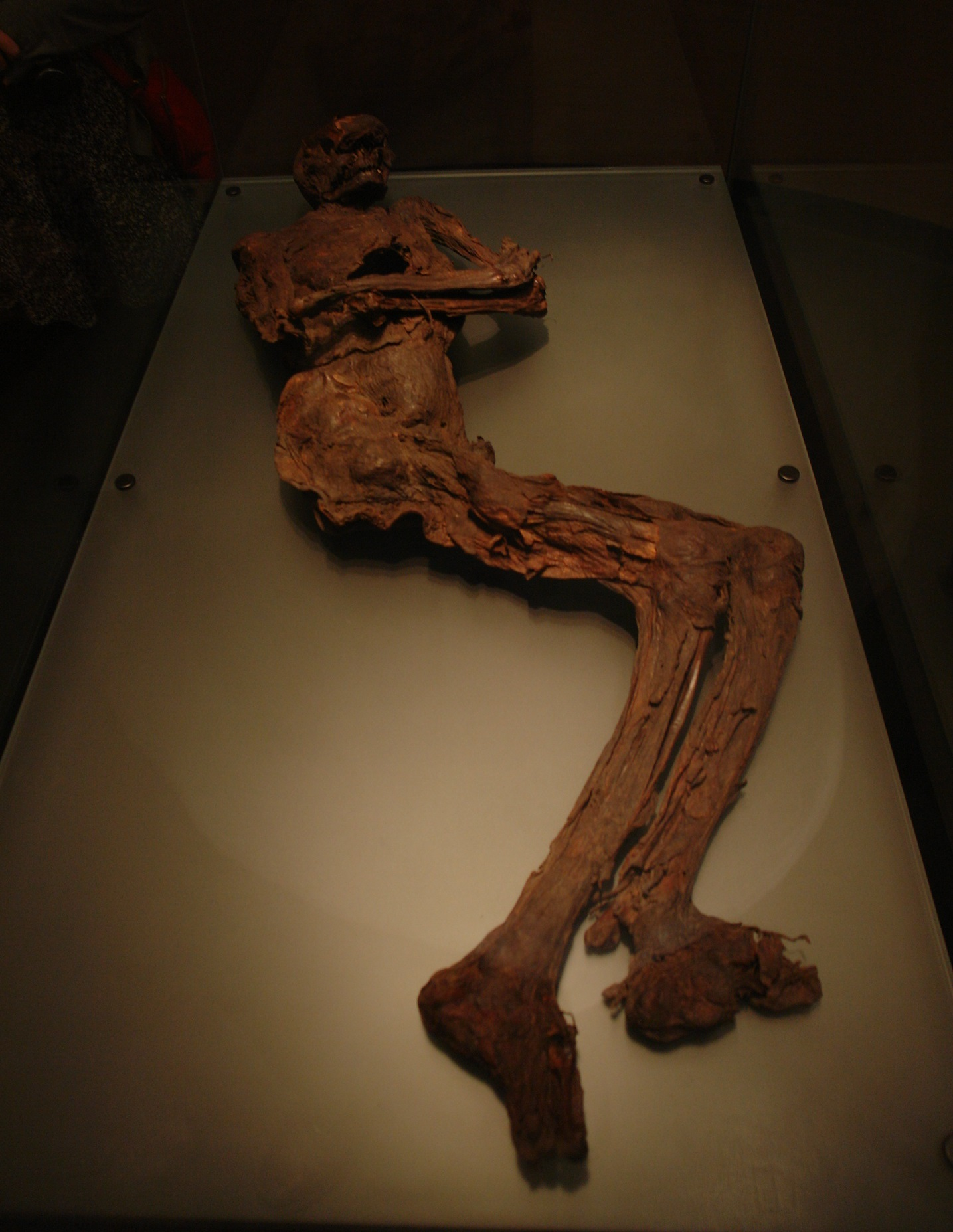
Full view of the remains

Scientific dating has placed Gallagh Man firmly within the Iron Age, although published date ranges vary. In 1995, archaeologists Anna L. Brindley and Jan N. Lanting published radiocarbon dates obtained from two bone samples, identified as OxA-2923 and Har-6908. The results produced calibrated ranges of 512–434 BCE, 414–166 BCE and 134–126 BCE at a 95.4 per cent confidence interval. The Archaeological Institute of America gives a broader date range of approximately 470–120 BCE.

Irish archaeologist Eamonn P. Kelly, of the National Museum of Ireland, has given an approximate date of 400–200 BCE for Gallagh Man.

Published assessments identify the remains as those of a young adult male. Archaeologist Miranda Aldhouse-Green estimated that Gallagh Man was in his 20s when he died, while the PBS survey gives an age at death of approximately 25 years.

== Cause of death ==
Elements of his burial indicate he did not die from natural causes. The body was pinned down by stakes, and a withy hoop was found wrapped around his throat.

The withy hoop around his neck may have been part of a spancel for restraining animals. It was probably used as a garrotte to strangle him, perhaps during a ritual involving human sacrifice, given that most of such bodies from this period are young males aged 25 to 40 years old, and like many of these victims, his hair had been closely cropped.

It is also possible that he was simply murdered or executed as a criminal. However, the willow rope strongly suggests ritual sacrifice; they are often mentioned for this purpose in early Irish mythological stories such as the Táin Bó Cúailnge.

== Exhibition ==
After his discovery in 1821, Gallagh Man remained at the find site in County Galway for eight years, during which the O'Kelly family periodically exhumed the body for public viewing. In 1829, the remains were purchased by the Royal Irish Academy, Ireland's principal learned society, and became part of its archaeological collections.

Gallagh Man was later transferred to the National Museum of Ireland – Archaeology in Dublin, where he is now exhibited in the museum's Kingship and Sacrifice exhibition alongside other Irish Iron Age bog bodies, including Old Croghan Man and Baronstown West Man. The exhibition explores archaeological evidence for violence, ritual deposition, kingship and religious belief in Iron Age Ireland (c. 500 BC – c. AD 400), and examines how archaeological interpretations of bog bodies have changed over time.

== See also ==
- List of bog bodies from Ireland
