= Body preservation =

Body preservation may refer to:

- Conservation and restoration of human remains, the long-term preservation and care of human remains in museum collections
- Cryonics, the storage of human remains using cryopreservation
- Embalming, the preservation of human remains by treatment with chemicals
- Mummification, the preservation of humans or animals by removing all moisture from the body
- Plastination, a technique used in anatomy to preserve bodies or body parts, developed in 1977
