= Clonycavan Man =

Iron Age Irish bog body

Coordinates: 53°31′29″N 7°0′26″W

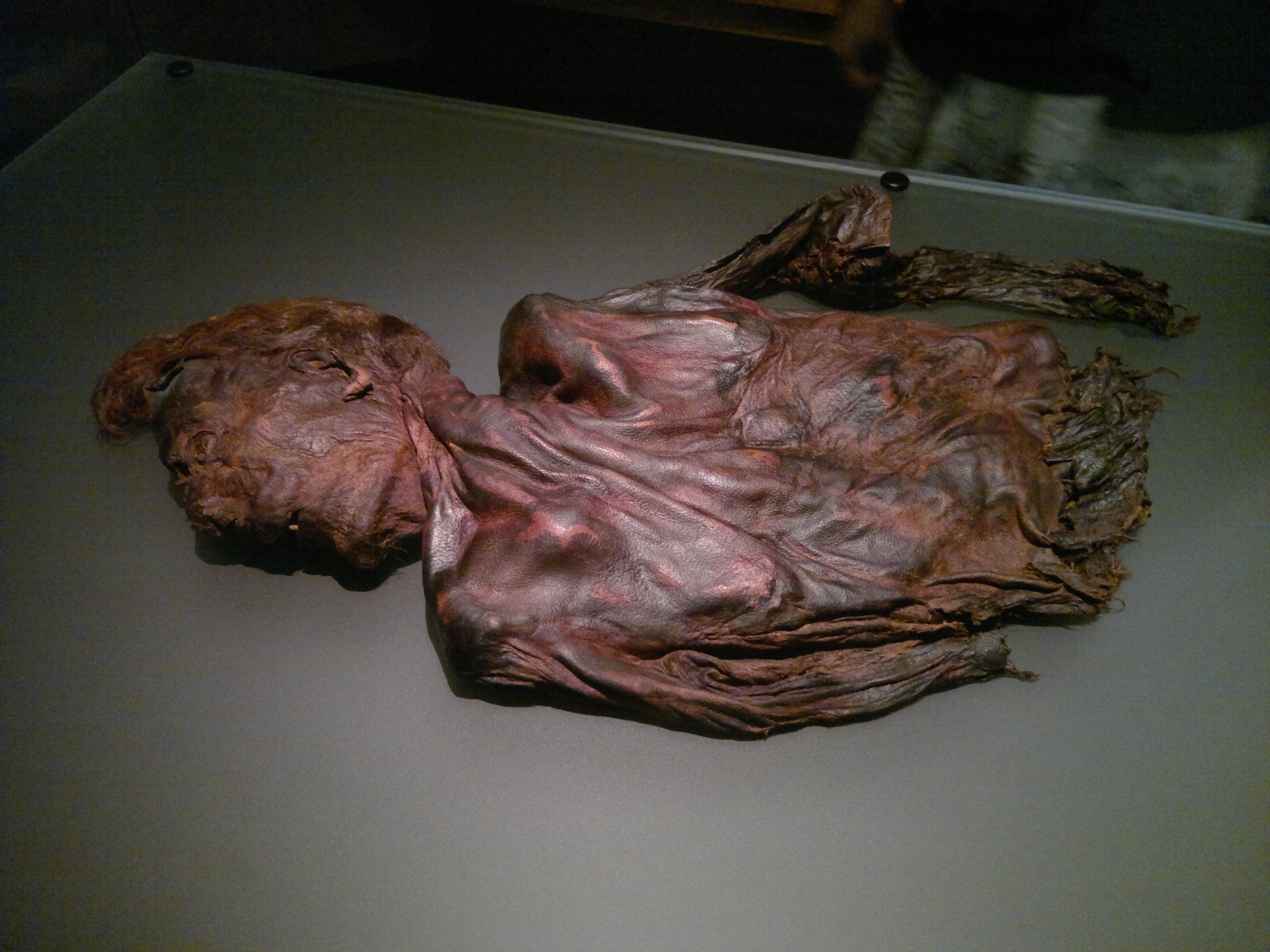
- Clonycavan Man
- Died: 392–201 BC; Present-day Ballivor, County Meath, Ireland
- Body discovered: March 2003
- Resting place: National Museum of Ireland – Archaeology, Dublin
- Known for: Iron Age bog body
- Height: 1.57 m (5 ft 2 in)

Clonycavan Man (Irish: Fear Chluain Uí Chabháin) is an Iron Age bog body discovered in 2003 in Clonycavan, near Ballivor, County Meath, Ireland. Radiocarbon dating indicates that he died between 392 and 201 BCE. Although his lower body was destroyed by modern peat-harvesting machinery before recovery, his head and upper torso remain exceptionally well preserved, retaining skin, soft tissue and an elaborate hairstyle.

Examination of the remains shows that the young man died a violent death after receiving multiple blows to the head and face. His distinctive raised hairstyle was held in place with a mixture of plant oil and imported pine resin from southwestern France or northern Spain, providing evidence of long-distance trade between Iron Age Ireland and continental Europe.

Clonycavan Man is one of the best-known Irish bog bodies. His discovery, followed three months later by that of Old Croghan Man, prompted the National Museum of Ireland to establish the multidisciplinary Bog Bodies Research Project, which transformed the scientific study of Irish bog bodies through archaeological, forensic and medical analyses.

== Discovery ==
The individual who became known as Clonycavan Man was discovered on 21 February 2003 during commercial peat harvesting at Bord na Móna's Ballivor Works in the townland of Clonycavan, near Ballivor, County Meath. His remains were carried through the peat-processing system after a mechanical excavator removed a block of peat from an active production field. Workers spotted his remains on a tramp screen, a metal grate that removes large debris from harvested peat, and reported the discovery to the authorities.

One week later, on 28 February 2003, archaeologists inspected the probable find spot after Bord na Móna identified the section of bog from which the peat had been excavated. More than five months later, on 12 August 2003, they returned to excavate a 100 m section of the bog but found no additional human remains or associated artefacts. Archaeologists concluded that peat-harvesting machinery had probably disturbed and displaced his body before workers uncovered it.

In May 2003, about three months later, Old Croghan Man was discovered in neighbouring County Offaly. The two discoveries prompted the National Museum of Ireland to establish the multidisciplinary Bog Bodies Research Project, bringing together specialists in archaeology, conservation, forensic science and medical imaging to study the remains.

== Condition ==
Only Clonycavan Man's head and torso are preserved. He was found in a modern peat harvesting machine, which was possibly responsible for the severing of his lower body.

== Scientific study ==
The scientific study of Clonycavan Man's hair has shed light on his diet in the years leading up to his death. His diet was rich in vegetables and protein, suggesting he may have been killed during the warmer summer months. Clonycavan Man was also fairly young at the time of his death; he is believed to have been in his early twenties.

The most distinguishing feature of the man was his hairstyle, which was raised upon his head in a Mohawk style with the help of a "hair gel" of plant oil and pine resin, imported from south-western France or northern Spain. Remnants of a hair tie was also found on the corpse. This may attest to trade between Ireland and southern Europe in the fourth and third centuries BCE, before Roman influence was brought to bear on the Celts of Iberia. This could also suggest that he was wealthy, as few others would have been able to buy imported cosmetics. His body also shows no signs of physical labour, reinforcing the idea he was a man of wealth. The hairstyle was possibly a way to make the man appear taller, as examination of his remains suggests that he was only five feet two inches tall (157.48 cm).

Radiocarbon dating has placed his death to between 392 BC and 201 BC, during the Iron Age of western Europe, making his remains around 2,300 years old.

== Cause of death ==
Speculative facial reconstruction of Clonycavan Man

Clonycavan Man is believed to have been murdered, based on an examination of the evidence found on his body by the Garda Technical Bureau (Irish Police Forensic Division). His skull looks to have been split open by a sharp implement. There is a deep wound on the top of his head, and parts of his brain have been found in this wound. There is also a large laceration across the bridge of his nose, leading under his right eye. This is believed to be the blow that killed him. Both injuries seem to have been caused by the same sharp implement, most likely an axe. He was also disembowelled.

The reasons for his killing are unknown, but it is theorised by some that he was a ritual sacrifice of some type. His nipples and other body parts that consist of fragile tissue were missing, which could be from natural decomposition or possibly mutilation. A hill that could possibly have been used for kingship ceremonies was near the bog where Clonycavan Man was found, leading to further speculation about the body.

== Exhibition ==
Clonycavan Man is on permanent display at the National Museum of Ireland – Archaeology in Dublin as part of Kingship and Sacrifice, alongside other Irish bog bodies, including Old Croghan Man, Gallagh Man and Baronstown West Man.

== See also ==
- List of bog bodies
