= Croghan Hill =

Hill in Offaly, Ireland

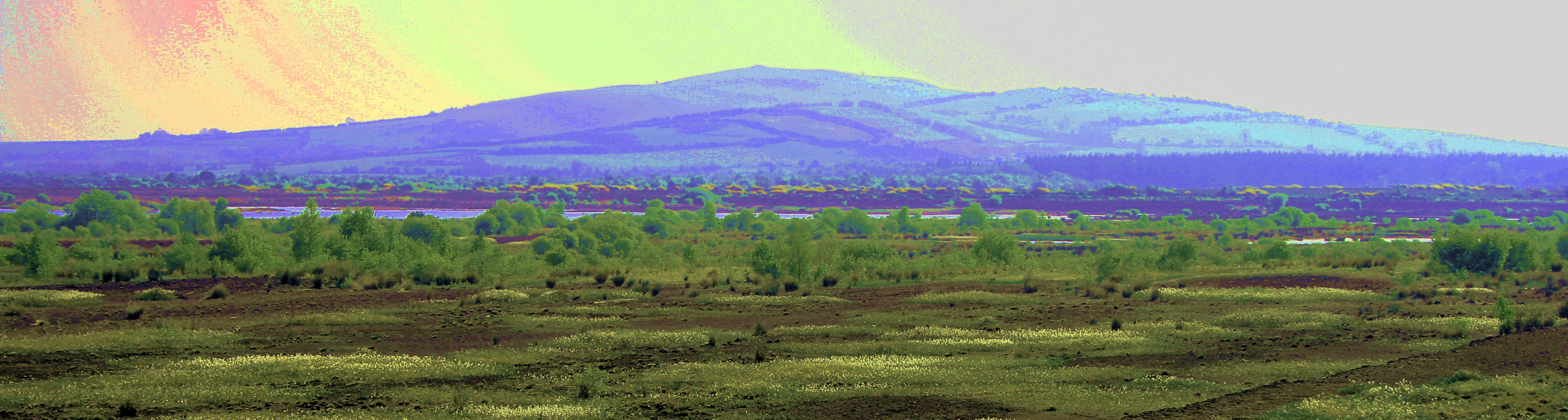
- Croghan Hill, from the southwest

Highest point
- Elevation: 234 m (768 ft)
- Prominence: 159
- Listing: Marilyn
- Coordinates: 53°20′48″N 7°16′39″W

Naming
- Native name: Cnoc Cruacháin / Brí Éile

Geography
- Location within island of Ireland
- Location: County Offaly, Ireland
- OSI/OSNI grid: N482331
- Topo map: OSi Discovery 48

Geology
- Rock age: Carboniferous
- Mountain type: Extinct volcano
- Last eruption: ±350 MYA

Croghan Hill (Irish: Cnoc Cruacháin or Brí Éile) is a hill with a height of 234 metres (768 ft) in County Offaly, Ireland. The remains of an extinct volcano, it rises from the Bog of Allen and dominates the surrounding plains. It is composed of basalt, diorite, and volcanic ash. Historically known as Brí Éile, it is mentioned in Irish mythology and is traditionally seen as a sacred hill. On the summit is an ancient burial mound with panoramic views, which reputedly became the inauguration site of the kings of Uí Failghe. On the eastern slope is an old graveyard and the remains of a medieval church, while at the western foot of the hill are the remains of a medieval settlement, church, and castle. An ancient bog body, Old Croghan Man, was found nearby. The village of Croghan is at the southern foot of the hill.

== Archaeology and myth ==
Croghan Hill is traditionally seen as a sacred place. At the summit is an ancient burial mound, which has never been excavated but is believed to date from the Bronze Age or earlier. Seen from the sacred hill of Uisneach, the midwinter sun rises over Croghan Hill. In Irish mythology, Croghan Hill is called Brí Éile or Cruachán Brí Éile. Éile, which may come from a word meaning "prayer, praise", is said to be an Otherworldly woman or goddess who dwells within the mound. It was believed to be a portal to the Otherworld. The Boyhood Deeds of Fionn says that each Samhain the men of Ireland went to the hilltop to woo this beautiful maiden, and that each year someone would mysteriously be killed to mark the occasion, by persons unknown.

An ancient bog body, Old Croghan Man, was found near the hill in 2003. He died sometime between 362 BC and 175 BC, and appears to have been a king or man of high-status who was ritually killed.

On the eastern slope of the hill is an old graveyard and the remains of an early medieval church. This church is named after Bishop Mac Caille, who is said to have been associated with Saint Patrick. The hill also has associations with Saint Brigid. She was said to have been born nearby and to have performed a miracle there so that she could cross the bogs which surround the hill.

The hilltop may have been the inauguration place of the Ó Conchobhair (O'Connor) kings of Uí Failghe (Offaly). At the western foot of the hill are the ruins of an O'Connor castle as well as a medieval settlement and church.

There are also several holy wells around the hill.

== See also ==
- List of volcanoes in the Republic of Ireland
