= Girl of the Uchter Moor =

Iron Age bog body found in Lower Saxony, Germany

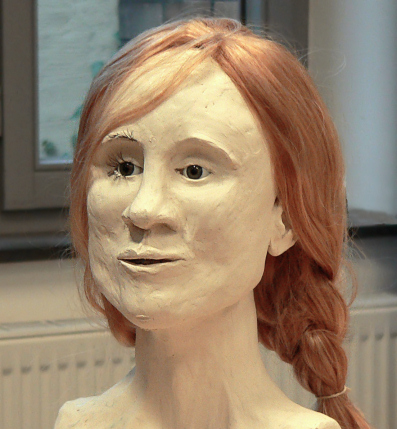
- Facial reconstruction with red hair
- Born: c. 7th century BC; Unknown
- Died: Between 764 and 515 BC; Near present-day Uchte, Lower Saxony, Germany
- Body discovered: 6 September 2000; Near Uchte, Lower Saxony, Germany; 52°30′56″N 8°51′12″E
- Other name: Moora (nickname)
- Known for: Iron Age bog body with multiple facial reconstructions

The Girl of the Uchter Moor, also known as Moora, is a female Iron Age bog body discovered in 2000 in marshland near Uchte, Germany. The remains include vertebrae, hair, and skull pieces. The studies of the body began in 2005. The radiocarbon dating performed at the University of Kiel showed that she had died between 764 and 515 BC. Despite common Iron Age burial practices, the body was not cremated. All the body parts are estimated to have been found except for one scapula.

Before DNA analysis and radiocarbon dating, the body was initially believed to be that of a sixteen-year-old girl, Elke Kerll, who had disappeared in 1969 after going to a dance club.

== Analysis ==
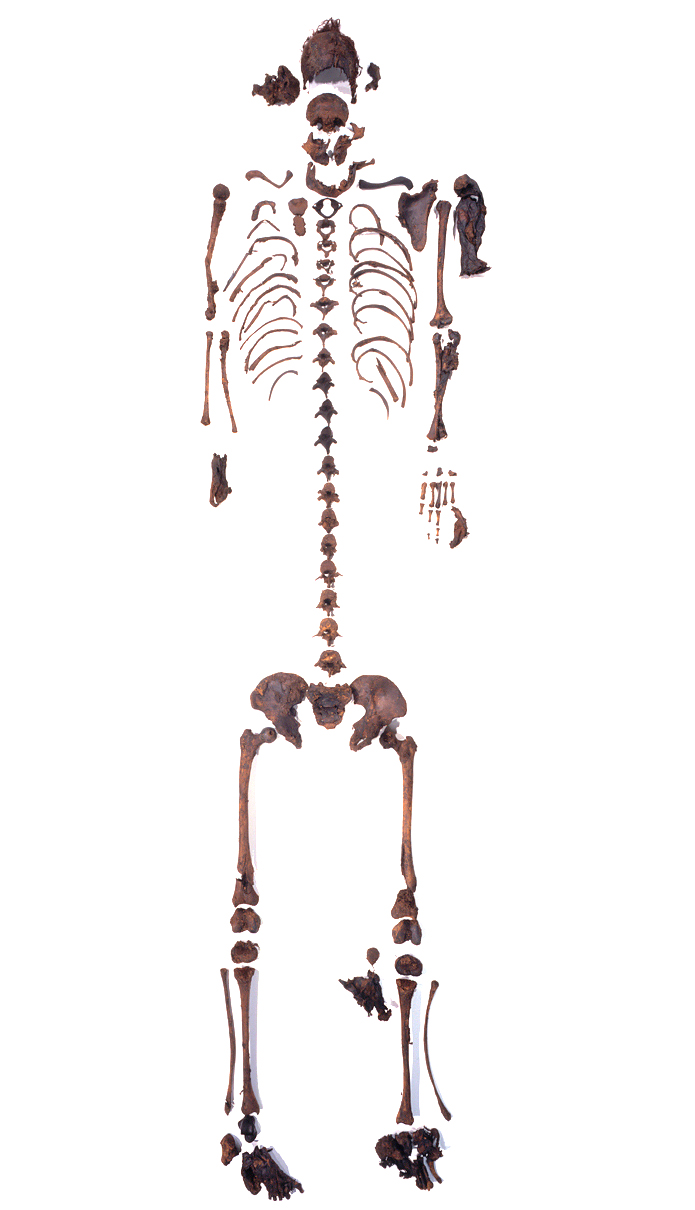
Skeletal remains of the Girl of the Uchter Moor (Moora), arranged for study by the Lower Saxony State Office for Cultural Heritage.

Moora was estimated to be between 17 and 19 years old at the time of her death. Osteological analysis indicates she was left-handed.

The analysis of Moora's skeleton revealed she had likely experienced intense physical labour in her lifetime, likely repeatedly carrying heavy loads such as water jugs, while roaming through the marshland.

According to Saring Dennis from the University Hospital Hamburg-Eppendorf, Moora had sustained at least two partial skull fractures in her lifetime, both of which had gradually healed in time.

Bone growth lines indicate periods of physiological stress consistent with chronic malnutrition during childhood and adolescence, as well as extended illness, possibly associated with harsh winter conditions.

Moora was also diagnosed to have a benign tumour at the base of her skull, which may have contributed to the spine curvature and chronic inflammation in the leg bones.

Her cause of death remains unknown. It was only determined that Moora was naked at the time she was deposited into the bog.

== Facial reconstructions ==
Moora's face has been reconstructed a number of times. The two that were created in the traditional way were built by moulding material over a plastic replica of the skull. The artist had to estimate the shape of the girl's lips, hair colour and skin tones, similar to the process of the Yde Girl.

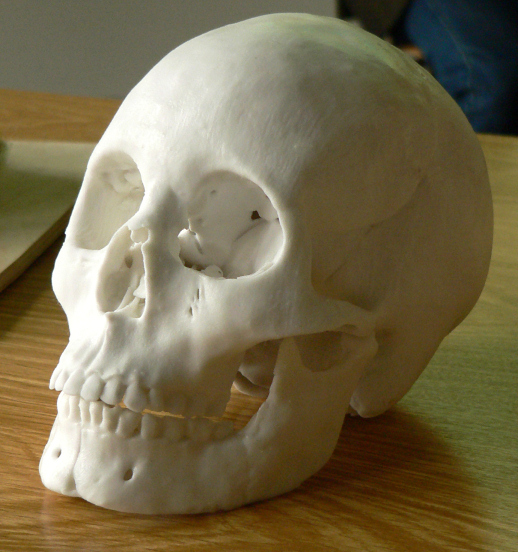
3D reconstruction of the skull

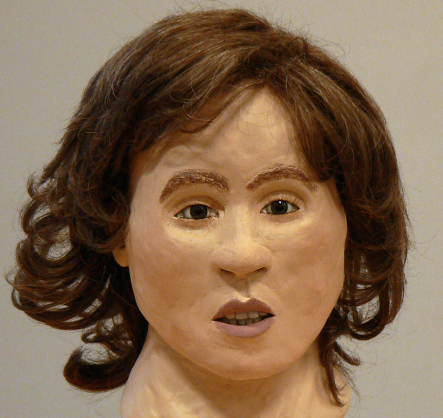
Facial reconstruction with brown hair

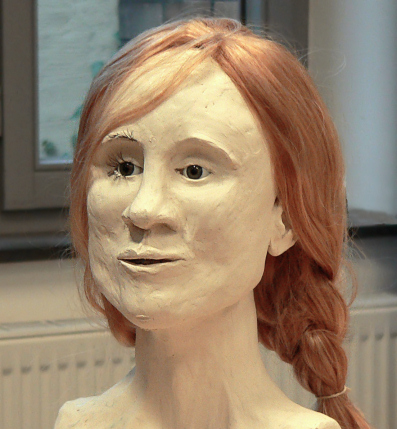
Facial reconstruction with red hair

== See also ==
- List of bog bodies
