= Lough Guitane =

Lake in County Kerry, Ireland

- Loch Coiteáin (Irish)
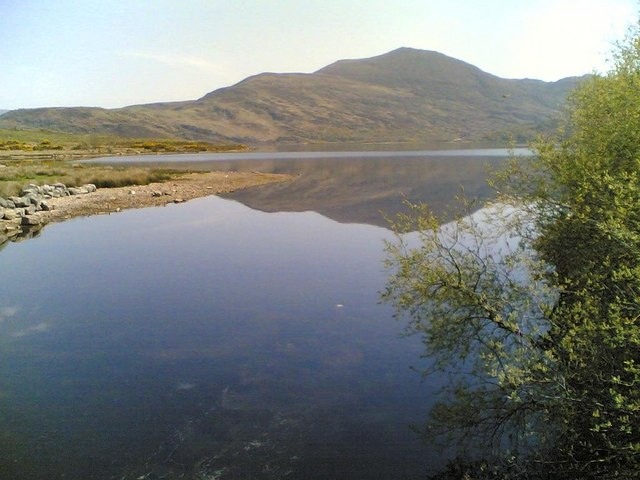

- Location in Ireland
- Location: County Kerry
- Coordinates: 52°0′31″N 9°25′9″W
- Catchment area: 19.03 km^{2} (7.3 sq mi)
- Basin countries: Ireland
- Max. length: 2.05 km (1.3 mi)
- Max. width: 1.25 km (1 mi)
- Surface area: 2.46 km^{2} (0.95 sq mi)
- Surface elevation: 77 m (253 ft)

Lough Guitane (Irish: Loch Coiteáin) is a freshwater lake in the southwest of Ireland. It is located in County Kerry near the town of Killarney.

== Geography ==
Lough Guitane measures about 2 km (1.2 mi) long and 1 km (0.6 mi) wide. The lake is about 10 km (6 mi) southeast of Killarney and to the east of Killarney National Park.

== Geology ==
Lough Guitane is the site and namesake of a volcanic complex of tuffs and rhyolites, of which the centres are at Bennaunmore, Horses Glen, and Kileen.

== Natural history ==
Fish species in Lough Guitane include brown trout, mainly of the freshwater variety, with a smaller seasonal number of the sea variety.

== See also ==
- List of loughs in Ireland
