= Eamonn P. Kelly =

Irish archaeologist, historian and senior museum official

- Born: County Dublin, Ireland
- Occupations: Archaeology; historian

Eamonn P. Kelly (known as "Ned") is an Irish archaeologist and historian who worked for the Irish Antiquities Division of the National Museum of Ireland from 1975, including as Keeper of Irish Antiquities (1992-2014). He also held the role of Acting Director (informal, November 1995-April, 1996) of the whole National Museum, and Acting Keeper of Art and Industry (2013-2014). He retired in July 2014, but continues to work for the museum as a heritage consultant.

Kelly was born in County Dublin. He has published extensively on a wide range of Irish archaeological subjects including prehistoric antiques, bog bodies, ancient Celtic rites and mythology, Viking fortifications, and Viking influence on Irish culture. He has also written on Classical and Egyptian collections and ethnography.

== Selected publications ==
- "The Vikings in Connemara". In: "The Viking Age: Ireland and the West". Papers from the Proceedings of the Fifteenth Viking Congress, Cork, 18-27 August 2005, ed. J. Sheehan & D’Ó Corráin. Dublin: Four Courts Press, Dublin, 2010
- "Power, Prestige and Production: Problems associated with La Tène Art in Ireland". In Treasures of Celtic Art: A European Heritage. New York: Metropolitan Museum of Art, 1998
- "The Archaeology of Ireland 3: The Pagan Celts". Ireland Today, No. 1006, 7-10, 1984

== Sources ==
- Bentley, Diana. "The Dark Secrets of the Bog Bodies: Interview with Eamonn P. (Ned) Kelly". The International Review of Ancient Art & Archaeology, March/April 2015
