= Old Croghan Man =

Iron Age bog body from Ireland

Coordinates: 53°20′0″N 7°18′0″W

- Seanfhear Chruacháin
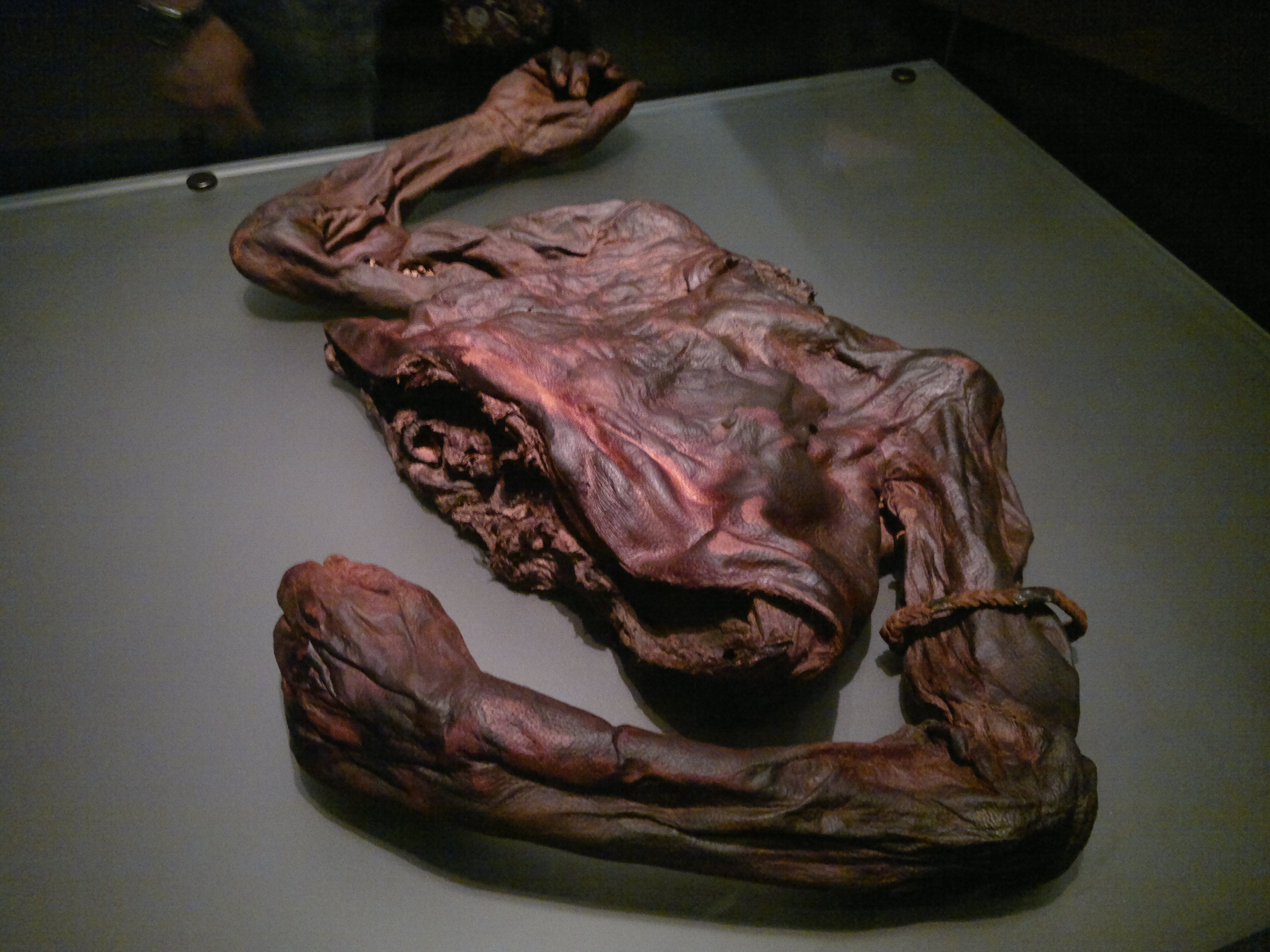
- Torso and arms of Old Croghan Man on display in the National Museum of Ireland
- Died: 362–175 BC (aged early twenties); Bog near Croghan Hill, County Offaly, Ireland
- Cause of death: Stab wound to the chest; decapitation and dismemberment (probable ritual killing)
- Body discovered: June 2003, near Croghan Hill, County Offaly, Ireland
- Resting place: National Museum of Ireland – Archaeology, Dublin
- Known for: Iron Age bog body from County Offaly, Ireland
- Height: 182 cm (5 ft 11.5 in)–198 cm (6 ft 6 in)

Old Croghan Man (Irish: Seanfhear Chruacháin) is a well-preserved Irish Iron Age bog body found in June 2003. The remains are named after Croghan Hill, north of Daingean, County Offaly, near where the body was found. The find is on display in the National Museum of Ireland in Dublin.

Old Croghan Man was found three months after a similar find, now known as Clonycavan Man, in County Meath.

== Identity and dating ==
Old Croghan Man is believed to have lived during the Irish Iron Age. Radiocarbon analysis places his death between about 362 BC and 175 BC, making him more than 2,000 years old. Based on the condition of his bones and soft tissue, he was a young adult in his early twenties when he died.

The man is calculated (based on his arm span) to have stood approximately between 182 cm (5 ft 11.5 in) and 198 cm (6 ft 6 in) tall, which is considered to be exceptionally tall for the period when he lived. The man's apparently manicured nails led to speculation that he was not someone who engaged in manual labour, and possibly therefore of high status.

His last meal (analysed from the contents in his stomach) was believed to have been wheat and buttermilk. However, he was shown to have had a meat-rich diet for at least the four months prior to his death. Scars on his lungs suggest he may have suffered from pleurisy.

== Death ==
The man was buried at a bog (likely once a lake) at the foot of an ancient hill that was used for kingship ceremonies. A 2014 documentary suggested that he was a king or prince who was sacrificed by druids due to poor weather or harvests. These ancient tribes may have believed that this was caused by the failure of the king and he was responsible.

When found, he was naked except for a plaited leather band around his left arm. This likely indicated high status. The man is believed to have died from a stab wound to the chest. He was decapitated and had his body cut in half. He also has an injury to one arm, possible evidence that he tried to defend himself. A similar wound has been seen on the Cashel Man, who was found in 2011, also in Ireland.

The body was found to have deep cuts under each nipple. Several theories have been suggested to explain this, including that the damage was caused (after death) by conditions in the bog, that the cuts were indicative of torture while the man was alive, or that the nipples were deliberately mutilated (either before or after death) for symbolic purposes. The latter theory, put forward by Eamonn Kelly of the National Museum of Ireland, suggests that the mutilation was a symbolic gesture to mark the man as a rejected ruler. Other theories suggest that Old Croghan Man and other bog bodies were sacrifices to gods of fertility or harvest, and killed and buried to ensure good yields of cereals and buttermilk.

== Discovery ==
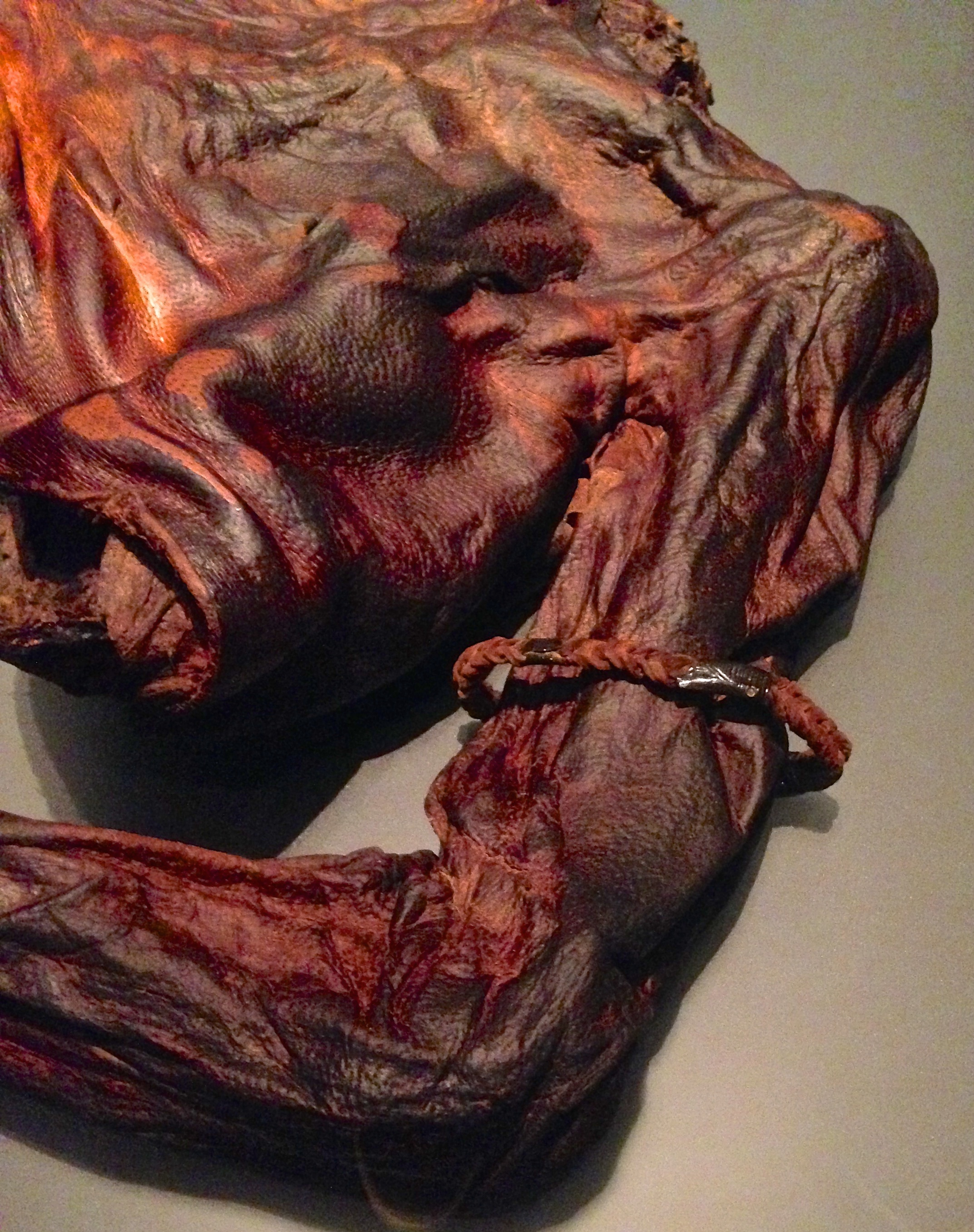
Old Croghan Man on display in the National Museum of Ireland

Old Croghan Man was discovered in June 2003 during commercial peat cutting in a raised bog near the base of Croghan Hill in County Offaly, in the Irish midlands. Peat cutters noticed the upper torso and arms in the freshly cut face of a drainage ditch, stopped work, and reported the find to the authorities.

The discovery came only a few months after another Iron Age bog body, Clonycavan Man, was found by peat workers in a different bog in County Meath.

Only the torso and upper limbs were present when the body was first seen. The head and lower body were missing. Later study showed that the man had already been cut at the neck and waist in the Iron Age, and that later drainage and peat cutting had disturbed the area again. In the wall of the drain, archaeologists found just a cluster of fingernails and a small piece of hazel branch used for tying or binding.

Staff from the National Museum of Ireland oversaw the recovery and conservation of Old Croghan Man, and he later became one of the main objects in the museum’s exhibition Kingship and Sacrifice.

=== Preservation ===
Like many northern European bog bodies, Old Croghan Man was preserved by the cold, wet and acidic conditions in the peat. The bog was low in oxygen and rich in sphagnum moss, which creates an environment that slows or stops the bacteria that normally break down soft tissue. This allowed the skin, soft tissues and some internal organs to survive in good condition.

The preserved torso includes large areas of skin, the upper arms and shoulders, and internal organs such as the lungs and stomach, which have been examined for signs of illness and for the remains of his last meals. The missing head and lower body, and tearing and compression around the surviving edges, point to both the original cutting up of the body and later damage caused by drainage and peat-cutting at the site.

=== Associated objects and clothing ===
Old Croghan Man was not wearing clothing when he was found, but he had a plaited leather arm-ring around his left arm. The arm-ring was made from waterlogged leather, strands of fibres and four bronze mounts. According to Louise Mumford of the National Museum, the leather ring was made with two strands of leather joined through numerous small slits.

The ring was initially removed from the body and wet cleaned to remove elements like peat from the leather. To prevent further decay of the waterlogged leather work and mould growth the arm-ring was stored in a 20% solution of glycerol and de-ionised water for two weeks in a process called consolidation. After drying and further chemical cleaning and treatment to prevent corrosion, the arm-ring was returned to the body for display.

The hazel found near the fingernails may come from a hoop, stake or binding that was once used when the body was placed in the bog, but its original role is not clear. The arm-ring and the sparse set of associated finds are often mentioned in support of interpretations that see Old Croghan Man as a high-status individual whose killing and burial formed part of an Iron Age ritual landscape focused on Croghan Hill.

== Related mythology ==
Croghan Hill is known as Bri Eile in Irish myth. In "The Boyhood Deeds of Fionn", it is told "At that time there was a very beautiful maiden in Bri Ele, that is to say, in the fairy-knoll of Bri Ele, and the name of that maiden was Ele. The men of Ireland were at feud about that maiden. One man after another went to woo her. Every year on Samain the wooing used to take place; for the fairy-mounds of Ireland were always open about Samain; for on Samain nothing could ever be hidden in the fairy-mounds. To each man that went to woo her this used to happen: one of his people was slain. This was done to mark the occasion, nor was it ever found out who did it."

== See also ==
- Clonycavan Man
- Cashel Man
- Bog body
  - List of bog bodies
