= Bog body =

Corpse preserved in a bog

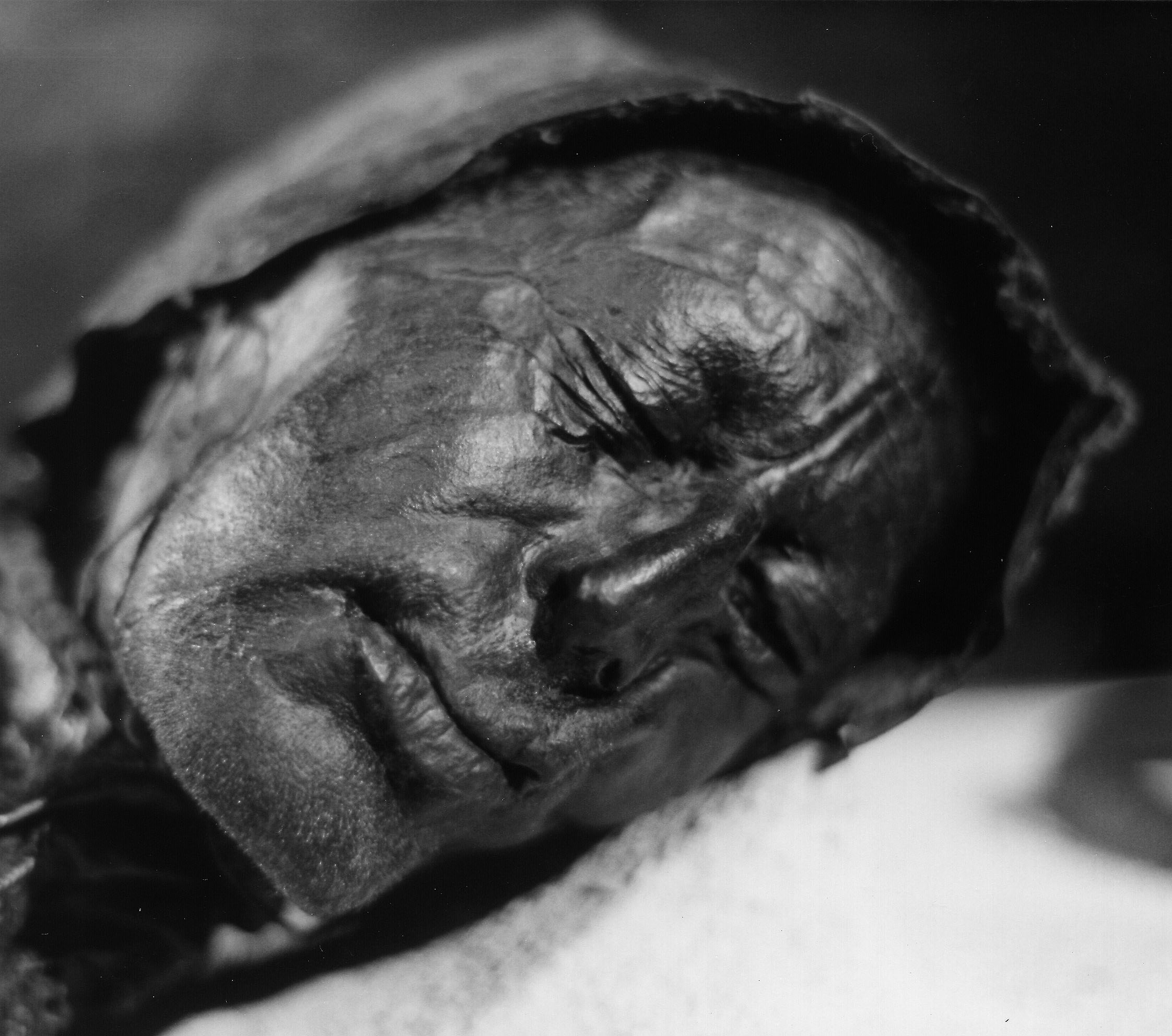
Tollund Man, Denmark, 4th century BC

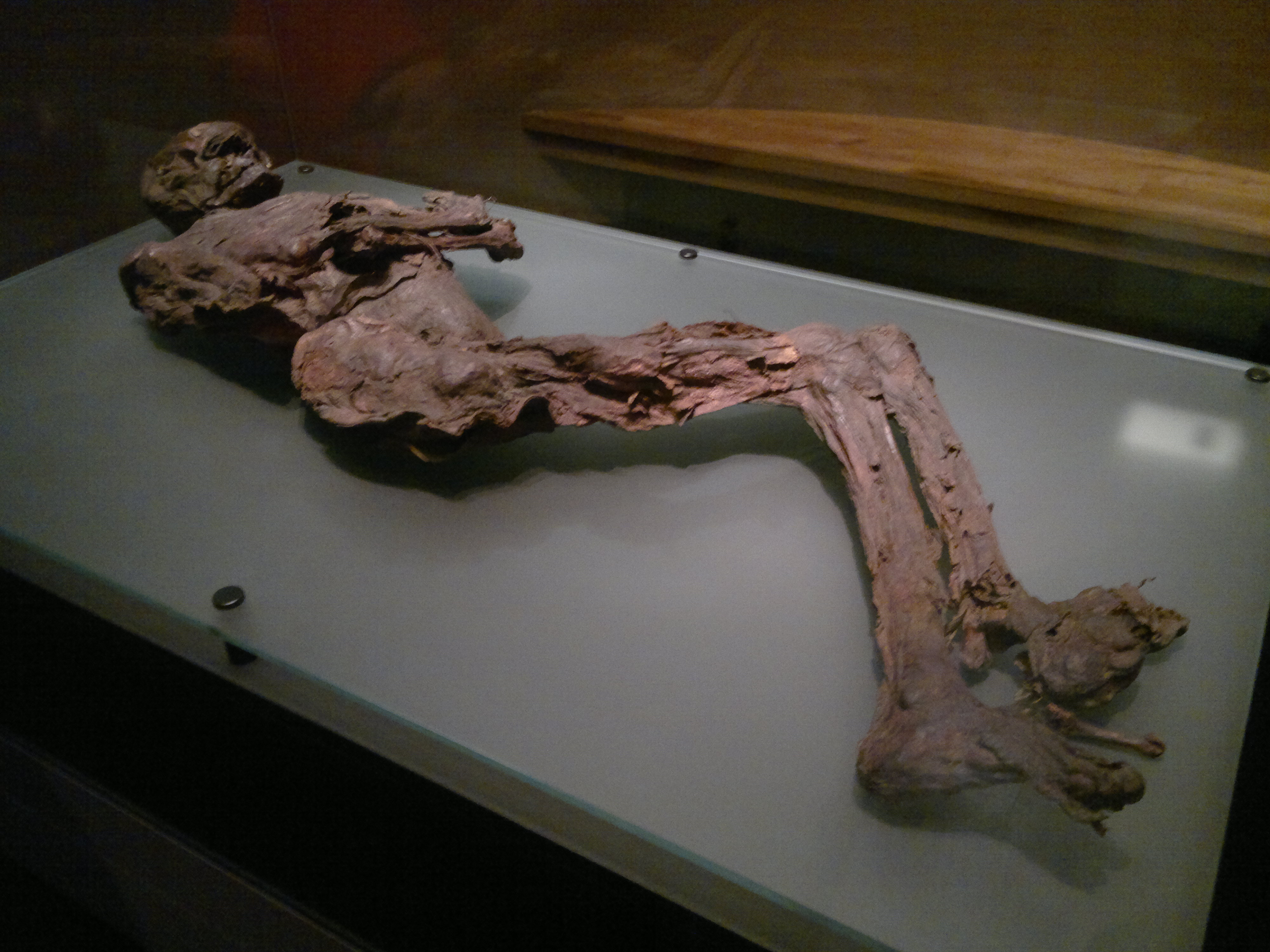
Gallagh Man, Ireland, c. 470–120 BC

A bog body is a cadaver that has been naturally mummified in a peat bog. Such bodies, sometimes known as bog people, are both geographically and chronologically widespread, having been dated between 8000 BC and the Second World War. The common factors of bog bodies are that they have been found in peat and are at least partially preserved. However, the actual levels of preservation vary widely, from immaculately preserved to mere skeletons.

Due to the unusual conditions of peat bogs – highly acidic water, low temperature, and a lack of oxygen – the soft tissue of bog bodies can be remarkably well-preserved in comparison to typical ancient human remains. The high levels of acidity can tan their skin and preserve internal organs, but inversely dissolve the calcium phosphate of bone. The natural protein keratin, present in skin, hair, nails, wool and leather, is resistant to the acidic conditions of peat bogs.

The number of bog bodies in existence is disputed, however, a recent study finds the number of documented bog bodies to be close to 122. The latest known bog bodies are those of soldiers killed in the wetlands of the Soviet Union during the Second World War.

== Bog chemistry ==
=== Natural preservation ===
The preservation of bog bodies in peat bogs is a natural phenomenon and not the result of human mummification processes. It is caused by the unique physical and biochemical composition of the bogs. Different types of bogs can affect the mummification process differently: raised bogs best preserve the corpses, whereas fens and transitional bogs tend to preserve harder tissues such as the skeleton rather than the soft tissue.

A limited number of bogs have the correct conditions for preservation of mammalian tissue. Most of these are located in colder climates near bodies of salt water. For example, in the area of Denmark where the Haraldskær Woman was recovered, salty air from the North Sea blows across the Jutland wetlands and provides an ideal environment for the growth of peat.

=== Bog chemistry and conditions ===
As new peat replaces the old peat, the older material underneath rots and releases humic acid, also known as bog acid. The bog acids, with pH levels similar to vinegar, preserve human bodies in the same way vegetables are preserved by pickling. In addition, peat bogs form in areas lacking drainage and hence are characterized by almost completely anaerobic conditions. This environment, highly acidic and devoid of oxygen, denies the prevalent subsurface aerobic organisms any opportunity to initiate decomposition.

Researchers discovered that preservation also requires that the body is placed in the bog during the winter or early spring when the water temperature is cold – i.e., less than 4 °C (39 °F). This allows bog acids to saturate the tissues before decay can begin. Bacteria are unable to grow rapidly enough for decomposition at temperatures under 4 °C.

The bog chemical environment involves a completely saturated acidic environment, where considerable concentrations of organic acids, which contribute most to the low pH of bog waters, and aldehydes are present. Layers of sphagnum, which are compacted layers of irregular mosses and other peat debris, and peat assist in preserving the cadavers by enveloping the tissue in a cold immobilizing matrix, impeding water circulation and any oxygenation.

=== Preservation and loss ===
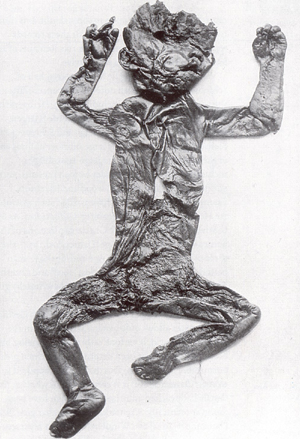
Discoveries such as Röst Girl no longer exist, having been destroyed during the Second World War (photo date: 1926).

An additional feature of anaerobic preservation by acidic bogs is the ability to conserve hair, clothing and leather items. Tollund Man was discovered with clothing preserved by bog conditions, including a pointed cap made of wool and sheepskin. The Huldremose Woman’s clothes, which included a woollen skirt, woollen scarf and skin capes, are very well preserved after nearly 2,000 years in a peat bog.

Modern experimenters have been able to mimic bog conditions in the laboratory and successfully demonstrated the preservation process, albeit over shorter time frames than the 2,500 years that Haraldskær Woman's body has survived.

Most of the bog bodies discovered showed some aspects of decay or else were not properly conserved. When such specimens are exposed to the normal atmosphere, they may begin to decompose rapidly. As a result, many specimens have been effectively destroyed. As of 1979, the number of specimens that have been preserved following discovery was 53.

== Historical context ==
=== Mesolithic to Bronze Age ===
The oldest bog body that has been identified is the Koelbjerg Man from Denmark, which has been dated to 8,000 BC, during the Mesolithic period.

Around 3,900 BC, agriculture was introduced to Denmark, either through cultural exchange or by migrating farmers, marking the beginning of the Neolithic in the region. It was during the early part of this Neolithic period that a number of human corpses that were interred in the area's peat bogs left evidence that there had been resistance to its introduction.

A disproportionate number of the Early Neolithic bodies found in Danish bogs were aged between 16 and 20 at the time of their death and deposition, and suggestions have been put forward that they were either human sacrifices or criminals executed for their socially deviant behaviour.

The oldest fleshed bog body is that of Cashel Man from Ireland, which dates to 2000 BC during the Bronze Age.

=== Iron Age ===
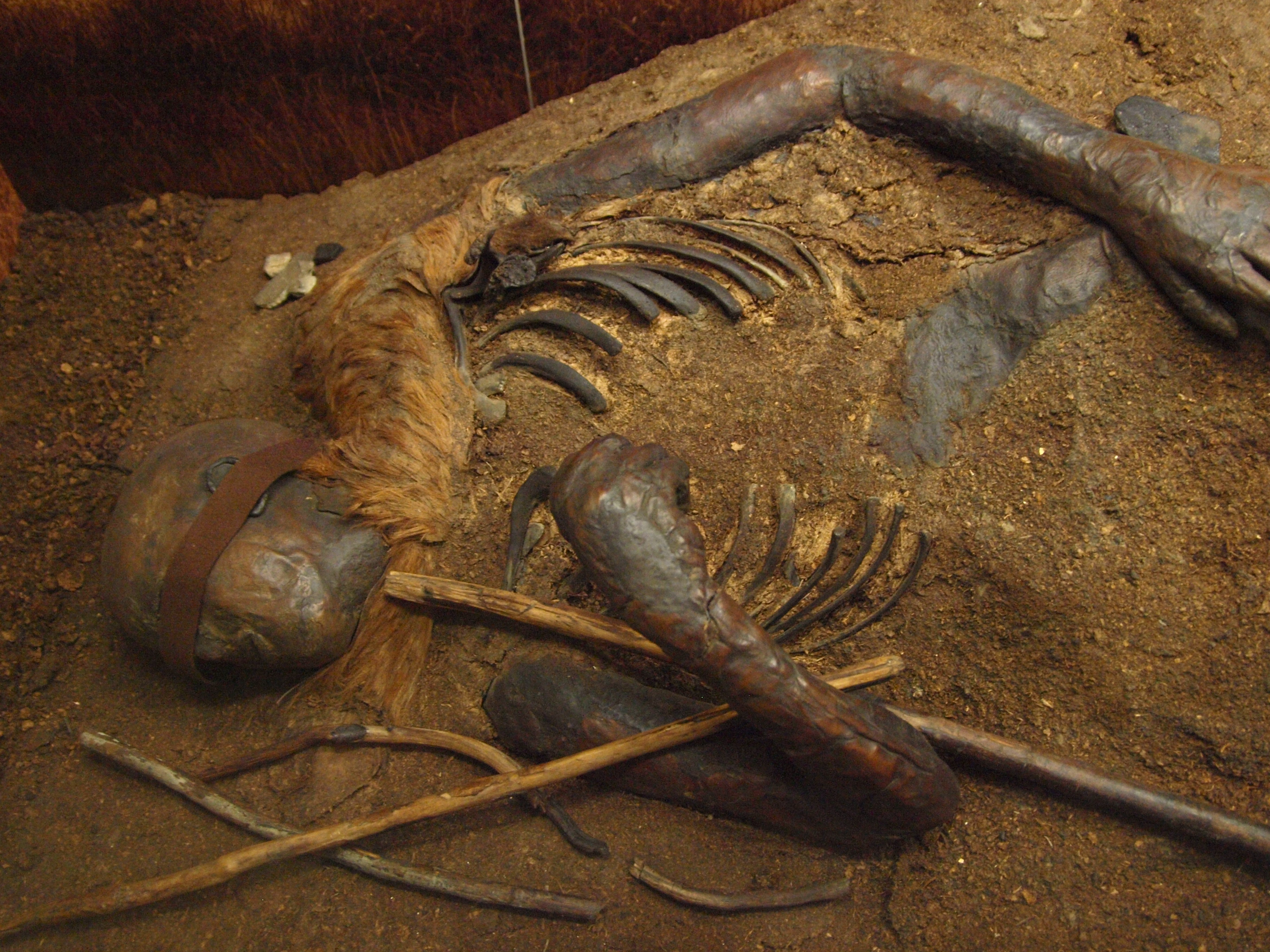
Windeby I, the body of a teenage boy, found in Schleswig, Germany

==== Context ====
The overwhelming majority of bog bodies – including examples such as Tollund Man, Grauballe Man and Lindow Man – date to the Iron Age and have been found in northwest Europe, particularly Denmark, Germany, the Netherlands, Britain, Sweden, Poland, and Ireland. During this period, peat bogs covered a much larger area of northern Europe.

Many of these Iron Age bodies bear a number of similarities, indicating a known cultural tradition of killing and depositing these people in a certain manner. These Pre-Roman Iron Age people lived in sedentary communities and built villages. Their society was hierarchical. They were agriculturalists, raising animals in captivity as well as growing crops. In some parts of northern Europe, they also fished. Although independent of the Roman Empire, which dominated southern Europe at this time, the inhabitants traded with the Romans.

==== Religious and cultural interpretations ====
For these people, the bogs held some sort of liminal significance, and indeed, they placed into them votive offerings intended for the Otherworld, often of neck-rings, wristlets or ankle-rings made of bronze or more rarely gold. The archaeologist P. V. Glob believed that these were "offerings to the gods of fertility and good fortune." It is therefore widely speculated that the Iron Age bog bodies were thrown into the bog for similar reasons and that they were therefore examples of human sacrifice to the gods.

The practice of drowning slaves who had performed rituals associated with the earth goddess Nerthus, as explicitly referenced in Tacitus' Germania, suggests that the bog bodies could have been sacrificial victims. A separate account (Germania XII), in which victims of punitive execution were pinned down in bogs using hurdles, provides a contrasting explanation.

==== Deposition practices and treatment of bodies ====
Usually, the corpses were naked, sometimes with some items of clothing with them, particularly headgear. The clothing is believed to have decomposed while in the bog for so long.

In a number of cases, twigs, sticks or stones were placed on top of the body, sometimes in a cross formation, and at other times, forked sticks had been driven into the peat to hold the corpse down. According to the archaeologist P. V. Glob, "this probably indicates the wish to pin the dead man firmly into the bog".

Yde Girl, and other bog bodies in Ireland, had the hair on one side of their heads closely cropped, although this could be due to one side of their head being exposed to oxygen for a longer period of time than the other.

==== Injuries and forensic interpretation ====
Many bog bodies show signs of being stabbed, bludgeoned, hanged or strangled, or a combination of these methods.

In some cases, the individual had been beheaded. In the case of the Osterby Man found at Kohlmoor, near Osterby, Germany, in 1948, the head had been deposited in the bog without its body. Some bog bodies, such as Tollund Man from Denmark and Yde Girl from the Netherlands, have been found with the rope used to strangle them still around their necks. Yde Girl's remains also showed marks near her left clavicle marks indicating sharp force trauma. Others show signs of torture, such as Old Croghan Man, who was stabbed repeatedly and suffered deep cuts beneath his nipples. There is also evidence his upper arms were pierced so that a rope could be pulled through to restrain him. Finally, he was cut in half.

Modern techniques of forensic analysis now suggest that some injuries, such as broken bones and crushed skulls, were not the result of torture, but rather due to the weight of the bog. For example, the fractured skull of Grauballe Man was at one time thought to have been caused by a blow to the head. However, a CT scan of Grauballe Man by Danish scientists determined his skull was fractured due to pressure from the bog long after his death.

Other details can also be ascertained from forensic analysis. Some of the bog bodies seem consistently to have been members of the upper class: their fingernails are manicured, and tests on hair protein routinely record good nutrition. Strabo records that the Celts practised auguries on the entrails of human victims: on some bog bodies, such as the Weerdinge Men found in the northern Netherlands, the entrails have been partly drawn out through incisions.

=== North America ===
A number of skeletons found in Florida have been called "bog people". These skeletons are the remains of people buried under water in peat between 5,000 and 8,000 years ago, during the Early and Middle Archaic period in the Americas. The peat at the Florida sites is loosely consolidated and much wetter than in European bogs. As a result, the skeletons are well preserved, but skin and most internal organs have not been preserved. An exception is that preserved brains have been found in nearly 100 skulls at Windover Archaeological Site and in one of several burials at Little Salt Spring. The bodies buried at Windover Pond were wrapped in cloth that was preserved with some of the burials. The bodies were held down by wooden stakes, many of which were also preserved. Besides the textiles and stakes, stone and bone tools and other wooden objects were found associated with the bodies. Ancient underwater burials in peat are known from several other locations in Florida.

== Discovery and archaeological investigation ==
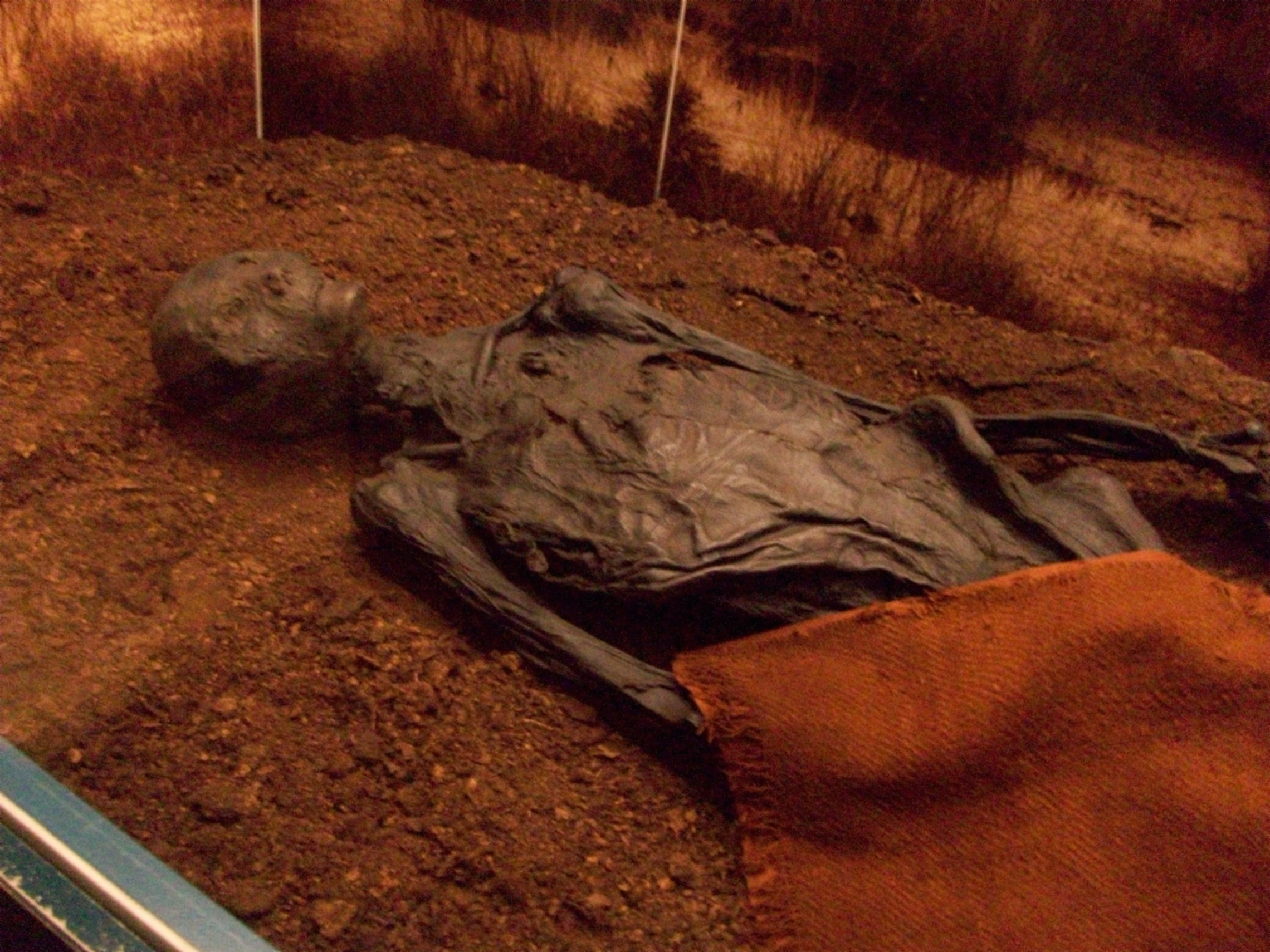
Rendswühren Man, Germany

Ever since the Iron Age, humans have used the bogs to harvest peat, a common fuel source. On various occasions throughout history, peat diggers have come across bog bodies. Records of such finds go back as far as the 17th century, and in 1640 a bog body was discovered at Schalkholz Fen in Holstein, Germany. This was possibly the first-ever such discovery recorded.

The first more fully documented account of the discovery of a bog body was in 1780 at a peat bog on Drumkeragh Mountain in County Down, Ireland; it was published by Elizabeth Rawdon, Countess of Moira, the wife of the local landowner. Such reports continued into the 18th century: for instance, a body was reportedly found on the Danish island of Fyn in 1773, whilst the Kibbelgaarn body was discovered in the Netherlands in 1791.

Throughout the 18th and 19th centuries, when such bodies were discovered, they were often removed from the bogs and given a Christian burial on consecrated church grounds in keeping with the religious beliefs of the community who found them, who often assumed that they were relatively modern.

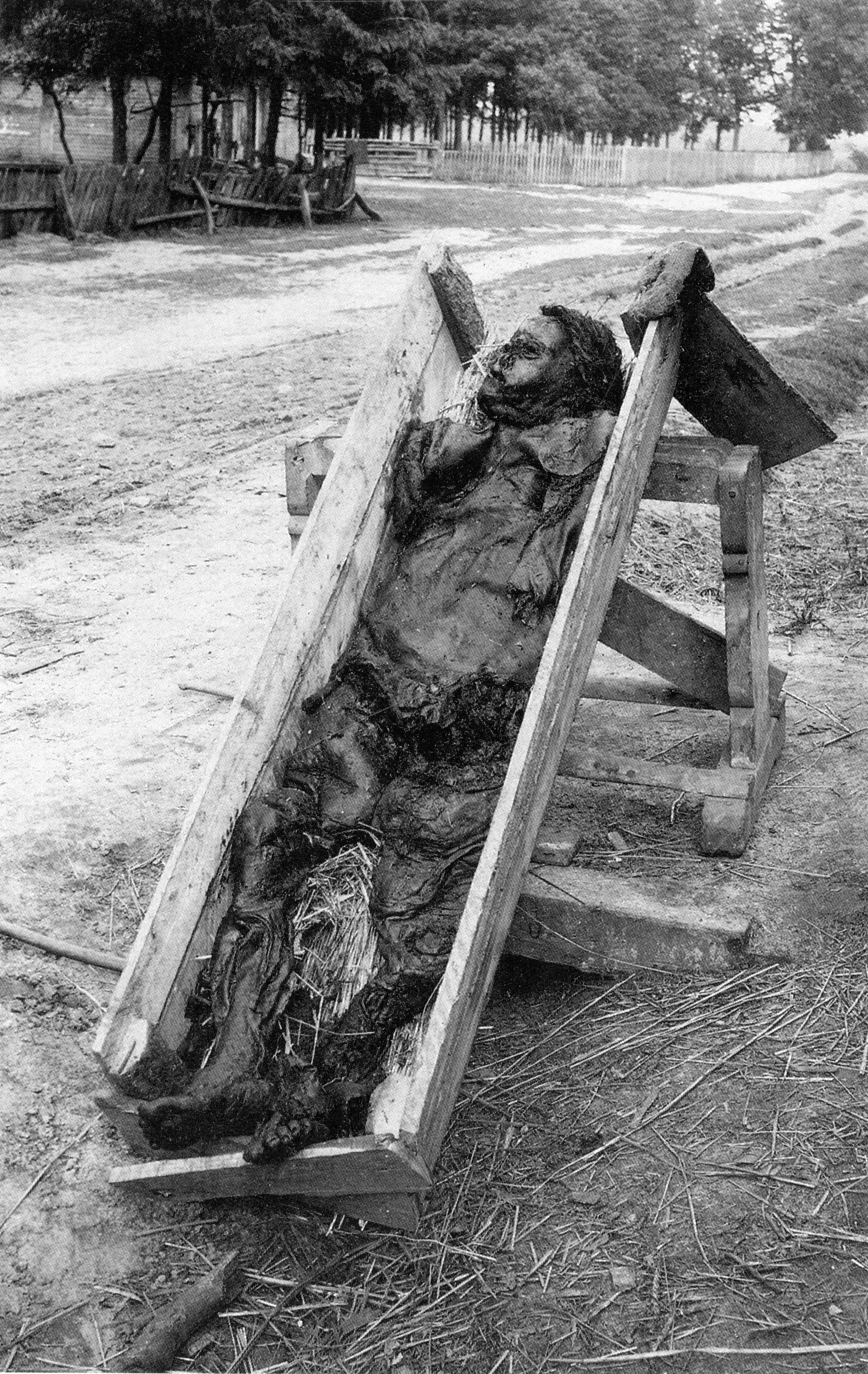
1903 excavation of the Kreepen Man

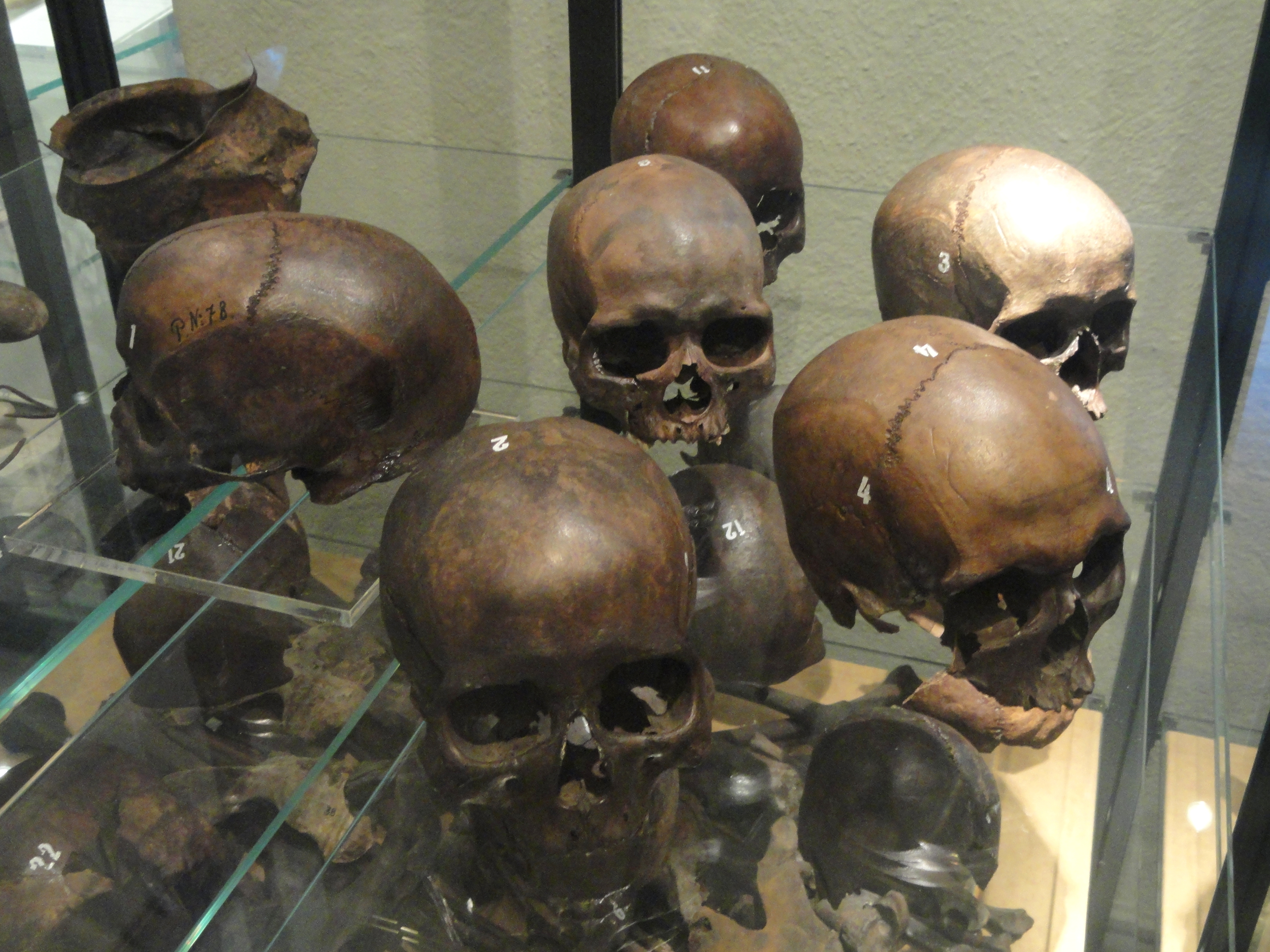
Remains from Levänluhta (Isokyrö, South Ostrobothnia) at the National Museum of Finland

With the rise of antiquarianism in the 19th century, some people began to speculate that many of the bog bodies were not recent murder victims but were ancient in origin. In 1843, at Corselitze on Falster in Denmark, a bog body unusually buried with ornaments (seven glass beads and a bronze pin) was unearthed and subsequently given a Christian burial. By order of the Crown Prince Frederick, who was an antiquarian, the body was dug up again and sent to the National Museum of Denmark. According to the archaeologist P.V. Glob, it was "he, more than anyone else, [who] helped to arouse the wide interest in Danish antiquities" such as the bog bodies.

After the Haraldskær Woman was unearthed in Denmark, she was exhibited as having been the legendary Queen Gunnhild of the Early Mediaeval period. This view was disputed by the archaeologist J. J. A. Worsaae, who argued that the body was Iron Age in origin, like most bog bodies, and predated any historical persons by at least 500 years.

The first bog body that was photographed was the Iron Age Rendswühren Man, discovered in 1871, at the Heidmoor Fen, near Kiel in Germany. His body was subsequently smoked as an early attempt at conservation and put on display in a museum.

With the rise of modern archaeology in the early 20th century, archaeologists began to excavate and investigate bog bodies more carefully and thoroughly.

=== Archaeological techniques ===
Until the mid-20th century, it was not readily apparent at the time of discovery whether a body had been buried in a bog for years, decades, or centuries. However, modern forensic and medical technologies (such as radiocarbon dating) have been developed that allow researchers to more closely determine the age of the burial, the person's age at death, and other details.

Scientists have been able to study the skin of the bog bodies, reconstruct their appearance and even determine what their last meal was from their stomach contents since peat marsh preserves soft internal tissue. Radiocarbon dating is also common as it accurately gives the date of the find, most usually from the Iron Age. For example, Tollund man of Denmark, whose remains were recovered in 1950, has undergone radiocarbon analyses that place his death date to around the 3rd or 4th century.

More modern analyses using stable isotope measurements have allowed scientists to study bone collagen collected from Tollund Man to determine his diet as being terrestrial-based. Their teeth also indicate their age at death and what type of food they ate throughout their lifetime. Dental caries, which are cavities within teeth, can direct archaeologist toward a person's diet prior to their death. Unlike erosion that the teeth may undergo due to decay, dental caries are typically sharp and well-defined cavities that have a larger diameter than erosion that occurs after death. Significant rates of dental caries point to diets that are rich in carbohydrates and can lead archaeologists to differentiate between plant-based diets and protein-based diets (animal protein is non-cariogenic). Dental enamel defects known as hypoplasias can also be seen in the analysis of teeth and can point towards malnutrition as well as diseases.

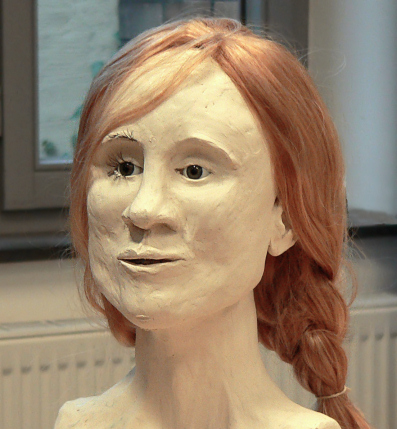
Reconstruction of the Girl of the Uchter Moor

Forensic facial reconstruction is one technique used in studying the bog bodies. Originally designed for identifying modern faces in crime investigations, this technique is a way of working out the facial features of a person by the shape of their skull. The face of one bog body, Yde Girl, was reconstructed in 1992 by forensic pathologist Richard Neave of Manchester University using CT scans of her head. Yde Girl and her modern reconstruction are displayed at the Drents Museum in Assen. Such reconstructions have also been made of the heads of Lindow Man (British Museum, London, United Kingdom), Grauballe Man, Girl of the Uchter Moor, Clonycavan Man, Roter Franz and Windeby I.

Ground-penetrating radar can be used in archaeological investigation to map features beneath the ground to reconstruct 3D visualizations. For bog bodies, ground-penetrating radar can be used to detect bodies and artefacts beneath the bog surface before cutting into the peat.

== Notable bog bodies ==
The German scientist Alfred Dieck published a catalogue of more than 1,850 bog bodies that he had counted between 1939 and 1986, but most were unverified by documents or archaeological finds. A 2002 analysis of Dieck's work by German archaeologists concluded that much of his work was unreliable. Countering Dieck's supposed findings of more than 1,400 bog bodies, a more recent study finds the number of documented bog bodies to be closer to 122. The most recent bog bodies are those of soldiers killed in the wetlands of the Soviet Union during the Second World War. The bodies have been most commonly found in the Northern European countries of Denmark, Germany, the Netherlands, Great Britain, and Ireland.

Several bog bodies are notable for the high quality of their preservation and the substantial research by archaeologists and forensic scientists.

Popular name	Estimated death date	Discovery place, country	Discovery year	Notes & refs.
Cashel Man	2000 BC	County Laois, Ireland	2011	Oldest fleshed bog body in the world.
Cladh Hallan mummies	1600–1300 BC	South Uist Island, Scotland	1988
Uchter Moor Girl	764–515 BC	Uchte, Germany	2000
Haraldskær Woman	490 BC	Jutland, Denmark	1835
Gallagh Man	470–120 BC	County Galway, Ireland	1821
Borremose Bodies	700–400 BC	Himmerland, Denmark	1940s
Tollund Man	400 BC	Jutland, Denmark	1950
Clonycavan Man	392–201 BC	County Meath, Ireland	2003
Old Croghan Man	362–175 BC	County Offaly, Ireland	2003
Grauballe Man	290 BC	Jutland, Denmark	1952
Weerdinge Men	160–220 BC	Drenthe, Netherlands	1904
Yde Girl	170 BC–230 AD	nearby Yde, Netherlands	1897
Windeby I	41 BC–118 AD	Schleswig-Holstein, Germany	1952
Lindow Man	2 BC–119 AD	Cheshire, England	1984
Bocksten Man	1290–1430 AD	Varberg, Sweden	1936

A more complete list is given in the article List of bog bodies.
