= Opened Ground: Poems 1966–1996 =

1998 book by Seamus Heaney

- 1st ed. cover art, using Christ Child with a Walking Frame
- Author: Seamus Heaney
- Language: English
- Genre: Poetry collection
- Publisher: Faber and Faber
- Publication date: September 27, 1998
- ISBN: 978-0-57-119493-3

Opened Ground: Poems 1966–1996 is a 1998 poetry collection by Seamus Heaney, published by Faber and Faber. It was published to replace his earlier 1990 collection titled New Selected Poems 1966–1987, including poems from said collection and later poems published after its release. (Note: Faber and Faber: "It replaces his New Selected Poems 1966-1987, giving a fuller selection from each of the volumes represented there and adding large parts of those that have appeared since...")

Critics have described the book as a means to observe Heaney's literary transition throughout his career. His first three collections focus on pastoral and rural themes while North to The Haw Lantern are more politically motivated due to then-ongoing tensions in Northern Ireland. The last two, Seeing Things and The Spirit Level, are described as more abstract and allegorical.

Reception, from both from general audiences and critics, has been generally positive. Praise is given to Heaney's technical writing abilities, especially in his early period, and linguistic depth. Criticism is mostly levied at the later poems, with reviewers citing Heaney's popularity influencing his poetry into becoming overly abstract to appease a wider audience.

== Background ==
Seamus Heaney was born on April 13, 1939, in Castledawson, County Londonderry, Northern Ireland. During his time studying in Queen's University Belfast, he began writing poetry under the pseudonym "Incertus". His first poetry collection, Death of a Naturalist, was published in 1966 by Faber and Faber. He was awarded the Nobel Prize in Literature in 1995. As Heaney grew more popular, his style changed, notably turning more abstract and literary as opposed to his rustic poetic beginnings.

The Troubles were an ethno-nationalist conflict which started during the late 1960s, fueled by various factors including Irish nationalism, historical grievances, and civil rights issues. Its effects were prevalent throughout Europe, (Note: See 1979 Brussels bombing, 1987 Rheindahlen bombing, and 1988 IRA attacks in the Netherlands for examples of Troubles-related incidents in mainland Europe.) but more specifically Northern Ireland where Heaney was living up until 1972 when he moved with his family to the Republic. His work, in particular his collection North (1975), heavily featured the Troubles, specifically covering the deaths of civilians and comparing them with sacrificed bog people.

== Contents ==
The book is a collection of Seamus Heaney's poems published between 1966 and 1996. It includes poems from Death of a Naturalist (1966), Door into the Dark (1969), Wintering Out (1972), Stations (1975), North (1975), Field Work (1979), Station Island (1984), The Haw Lantern (1987), Seeing Things (1991), and The Spirit Level (1996). Additionally, it includes the uncollected poems "The Names of the Hare" (1981), (Note: Heaney's translation of a Middle English poem. Later appears in The Translations of Seamus Heaney (2022).) "Villanelle for an Anniversary" (1986), (Note: Written to commemorate Harvard University's 350th anniversary, (Note: Heaney 1998: "'Villanelle for an Anniversary' was written to commemorate the 350th anniversary of the founding of Harvard College in 1636.") where Heaney worked as a visiting professor and poet-in-residence.) and "A Transgression" (1994). (Note: A poem Heaney originally wrote on a Christmas card in 1991, later revised in 1994.) Excerpts from Sweeney Astray (1983) and The Cure at Troy (1990) are also present and the book concludes with the 1995 lecture Heaney gave when he accepted his Nobel Prize in Literature titled Crediting Poetry.

All poems in Opened Ground
Phases	Original collection	Year of publication	Poems
Early	Death of a Naturalist	1966	"Digging", "Death of a Naturalist", "The Barn", "Blackberry-Picking", "Churning Day", "Follower", "Mid-Term Break", "The Diviner", "Poem", "Personal Helicon"
Early	Door into the Dark	1969	"The Outlaw", "The Forge", "Thatcher", "The Peninsula", "Requiem for the Croppies", "Undine", "The Wife's Tale", "Night Drive", "Relic of Memory", "A Lough Neagh Sequence", "The Given Note", "Whinlands", "The Plantation", "Bann Clay", "Bogland"
Early	Wintering Out	1972	"Fodder", "Bog Oak", "Anahorish", "Servant Boy", "Land", "Gifts of Rain", "Toome", "Broagh", "Oracle", "The Backward Look", "A New Song", "The Other Side", "Tinder" (from "A Northern Hoard"), "The Tollund Man", "Nerthus", "Wedding Day", "Mother of the Groom", "Summer Home", "Serenades", "Shore Woman", "Limbo", "Bye-Child", "Good-night", "Fireside", "Westering"
Middle	Stations	1975	"Nesting-Ground", "July", "England's Difficulty", "Visitant", "Trial Runs", "The Wanderer", "Cloistered", "The Stations of the West", "Incertus"
Middle	North	1975	"Mossbawn: Two Poems in Dedication" ("Sunlight", "The Seed Cutters"), "Antaeus", (Note: Despite being listed separately in the book (between Death of a Naturalist and Door into the Dark), "Antaeus" appears after "Mossbawn" in North. This is because the poem was originally written in 1966 and would not see publication until 9 years later.) "Funeral Rites", "North", "Viking Dublin: Trial Pieces", "Bone Dreams", "Bog Queen", "The Grauballe Man", "Punishment", "Strange Fruit", "Kinship", "Act of Union", "Hercules and Anataeus", "Whatever You Say Say Nothing" (Excerpt), "Singing School" ("The Ministry of Fear", "A Constable Calls", "Orange Drums, Tyrone, 1966", "Summer 1969", "Fosterage", "Exposure")
Middle	Field Work	1979	"Oysters", "Triptych" ("After a Killing", "Sibyl", "At the Water's Edge"), "The Toome Road", "A Drink of Water", "The Strand at Lough Beg", "Casualty", "Badgers", "The Singer's House", "The Guttural Muse", "Glanmore Sonnets", "An Afterwards", "The Otter", "The Skunk", "A Dream of Jealousy", "Field Work", "Song", "Leavings", "The Harvest Bow", "In Memoriam Francis Ledwidge", "Ugolino"
Middle	Station Island	1984	"The Underground", "Sloe Gin", "Chekhov on Sakhalin", "Sandstone Keepsake", "Shelf Life" ("Granite Cup", "Old Smoothing Iron", "Stone from Delphi"), "Making Strange", "The Birthplace", "Changes", "A Bat on the Road", "A Hazel Stick for Catherine Ann", "A Kite for Michael and Christopher", "The Railway Children", "Widgeon", "Sheelagh na Gig", "The Loaning" ("Aye"), "The King of the Ditchbacks", "Station Island", "Sweeney Redivivus" ("The First Gloss", "Sweeney Redivivus", "In the Beech", "The First Kingdom", "The First Flight", "Drifting Off", "The Cleric", "The Hermit", "The Master", "The Scribes", "Holly", "An Artist", "The Old Icons", "In Illo Tempore", "On the Road")
Middle	The Haw Lantern	1987	"For Bernard and Jane McCabe", "Alphabets", "Terminus", "From the Frontier of Writing", "The Haw Lantern", "From the Republic of Conscience", "Hailstones", "The Stone Verdict", "The Spoonbait", "Clearances", "The Milk Factory", "The Wishing Tree", "Grotus and Coventina", "Wolfe Tone", "From the Canton of Expectation", "The Mud Vision", "The Disappearing Island", "The Riddle"
Late	Seeing Things	1991	"The Golden Bough", "Markings", "Man and Boy", "Seeing Things", "An August Night", "Field of Vision", "The Pitchfork", "The Settle Bed", "Glanmore Revisited" (Excerpt), "A Pillowed Head", "A Royal Prospect", "Wheels within Wheels", "Fosterling", "Squarings" ("Lightenings", "Settings", "Crossings", "Squarings")
Late	The Spirit Level	1996	"The Rain Stick", "Mint", "A Sofa in the Forties", "Keeping Going", "Two Lorries", "Damson", "Weighing In", "St Kevin and the Blackbird", "The Flight Path" (Excerpt), "Mycenae Lookout", "The Gravel Walks", "Whitby-sur-Moyola", "Poet's Chair", "The Swing", "Two Stick Drawings", "A Call", "The Errand", "A Dog Was Crying Tonight in Wicklow Also", "The Strand", "The Walk", "At the Wellhead", "At Banagher", "Tollund", "Postscript"
Uncollected		"The Names of the Hare" (1981), "Villanelle for an Anniversary" (1986), "A Transgression" (1994)	
Translations		Sweeney Astray (Excerpt, 1983), The Cure at Troy (Excerpt, 1990)	
Prose		Crediting Poetry (1995 Nobel Prize lecture)	

== Phases ==
Due to the book spanning Heaney's career up until its release, critics such as Jonathan Allison and Michiko Kakutani have observed distinct phases being visible in the work, with unique themes and styles as Heaney evolved into an international figure.

=== Early phase (1968–1972) ===
Exemplified in his first three collections, Heaney's poetry was focused on growing up in rural Ulster during the 1940–1950's. Death of a Naturalist is described by Helen Vendler in 1996 as a "young country boy" learning about his adolescent sexuality, being a Catholic minority in Northern Ireland, and his journey of becoming a poet. Door into the Dark, according to R.F. Foster in 2020, was when the "'eccentric experience' of Northern Ireland would come into international focus". Wintering Out removed some focus from the autobiographical and moved it to the "inward exploration of Irish English".

During this phase, Heaney's style was described by Romy Dawson in 2021 as "[s]triking examples of diction, rhythm and rhyme [which] come together to produce ... intense, often erotic ... rural poetry." "Churning Day", (Note: From Death of a Naturalist.) for example, used the plosive consonants in the word "butter" to evoke similar and semantically applicable words like "pat" and "slap". In his 1996 article, David Perkins also observed this in "Bogland", (Note: From Door into the Dark.) stating Heaney uses the u vowel of "butter" to "evoke bodily sensations and obscure feelings of all kinds."

=== Middle phase (1975–1987) ===
Thematically, the middle phase was more inconsistent, with the political North giving way to a more pastoral and rural-themed Field Work. However, Station Island and The Haw Lantern returned to politics, with the former described by Vendler as containing "political and artistic self-scrutiny" while the latter sees Heaney "consider[ing] the predicament of a lyric poet under political pressure."

Heaney in North uses archaic vocabulary such as "obols" and "pampooties" in a "linguistic exhumation", Jay Parini wrote in 1980, meaning to draw parallels between the exhumation of bog people (which feature heavily in North) with the language used in the poetry. Shelley C. Reece, in his 1992 paper, further stated this was intentional in linking the Norse Gods to the Irish, most prevalent in its eponymous title poem. The diction and rhymes in Field Work, Henry Hart said in 1989, resembled the "relaxed, accessible style" of Robert Lowell, wavering between trusting and distrusting "transparent communication with his new, receptive community" following the publication of North. Station Island had been stylistically compared to Dante's Commedia, with its terza rima and narrative of a pilgrimage to St. Patrick's Purgatory, County Donegal. And The Haw Lantern, described as more international, was more open in its stylistic influences, with a tension between poetry and dialect "characterised at times by a confidence in its own mode."

=== Late phase (1991–1996) ===
Seeing Things and The Spirit Level, the later phase in the collection, have been described as abstract, with the 48 poem sequence "Squarings" (Note: From Seeing Things.) being a series of "quick, elusive glimpses" of his political issues and The Spirit Level being an analogy of the Trojan War applied to the Troubles.

The centrepiece of Seeing Things, "Squarings", is a four-part lyric with 48 poems, (Note: In Opened Ground, poems 4, 11, 16, 17, 18, 20, 21, 23, 25, 26, 28, 31, 35 are absent.) each containing 12 lines, within each part. Jefferson Hunter described in 1992 the poem sequence as "familiarly domestic" and remarked the poetry present as more literary than in the preceding volumes. R.F. Foster described The Spirit Level as containing an "autobiographical strain", with poems like "Keeping Going" (Note: Dedicated to Seamus's brother Hugh.) "riddled with fateful signs and omens of bad luck", and "Two Lorries" to be "constructed around that image of ashes, transmuted from warming domestic ritual to chilling emblems of mortality".

== Reception ==
In his 1998 review published in The Guardian, John Redmond said the inclusion of Crediting Poetry at the end of the book was unusual, but thought it was appropriate for the lecture talked about Heaney's time as an educator and "like ... Robert Frost, Heaney conceives poetry as a work of knowing." He lauded Heaney's earlier work for his observational ability, vocabulary, rhythm, and "psychological acuity", comparing the flow state one enters when using a tool, a recurring theme in his poetry, to Heaney stating his best work comes from such a state. Redmond was critical of Heaney's later work found in Seeing Things and The Spirit Land, believing Heaney to have fallen victim to "his own enlightenment" and newfound celebrity status.

Michiko Kakutani borrowed Heaney's words when describing his work in her 1998 review, writing his poetry contained not only "the unsaid off the palpable" but also the "music of what happens", in both home life and the world outside. Kakutani described his earlier work as a "tactile, sensuous apprehension of rural life" with a mortality salience present throughout, citing the fungal growths on the berries in "Blackberry-Picking". (Note: From Death of a Naturalist.) These gave way to the more politically involved North, which involved the Troubles in their narratives and use of bog bodies as metaphors for enduring historical violence. Later poems focus less on the Troubles, taking a "back seat to more personal and philosophical concerns", however it still remained in the background. In Kakutani's opinion, The Haw Lantern and Seeing Things were not Heaney's best work as she believed them to be overly abstract or predictable.

Jonathan Allison, writing in the Chicago Tribune in 1999, described being able to see the transition of Heaney's poetry throughout the book. He described Heaney's early poetry as using "dense, tactile language" to evoke imagery of his childhood farm life while in collections such as North and Field Work, the focus is on the Troubles, the latter of which he described as a "book of blessings" as it includes poems for pastoral peace and family. His later collections, The Haw Lantern and Seeing Things, Allison noted the sequential elegies Heaney wrote for his mother and father. He concluded stating Heaney's main strength was, like other renowned poets, his "enormous linguistic resources".

=== Scholarly ===
Writing in her 1999 review in the Harvard Review, Ann Cobb stated the exhilaration and satisfaction she gained through reading the book. She described the poems as evolving through a "complex contemporary lifetime", using an excerpt of the poem "Follower" to illustrate a recurring scene—that being Heaney's father farming—returning later "cast in a Virgilian light" in the poem "Man and Boy" and, quoting Heaney's poem "Poet's Chair", even later in "The Golden Bough" to illustrate the "sphere of shifting angles and fixed love" present within the poem.

William Pratt in his review for World Literature Today stated Heaney is "consistently agitated" by Irish politics which is shown throughout the poems in the book. He described Heaney as a "polemic poet" in-contrast with his predecessor W. B. Yeats whom he attributed as more of a lyrical poet, noting the rarer appearance of the Irish Civil War in Yeats versus the Troubles in Heaney. Yeats, Pratt wrote, traced the conflicts in Ireland to "classical and biblical roots of human imperfection", while Heaney believed them to be "proof of man's inhumanity to man". Pratt notes the hopeful tone in some of Heaney's poems and his transition into becoming an international poet through his translation work, but believed the best of Heaney's work is when it was "intensely Irish", and concluded saying there are more forgettable than memorable poems in the book.

In her review published in The Cambridge Quarterly in 2000, Alice Entwistle described the title Opened Ground as "pithy" and the collection as a gesture towards Ireland itself. Reading the book, she said, was like "leafing through a ... album of photographs", with each poem representing a part of Heaney's life, and believed the opening poem "Digging", a metaphor for writing according to her, is a "warning of well-prepared ground." The clever moments in later collections only "sharpens" the achievements of his older poems, Entwistle wrote, and she believed Opened Ground proved Heaney's preference for personal rather than political poetry, stating he "has rarely abandoned ... [neutrality] ... for a dangerously, explicitly partisan stance." His political ambivalence makes him "awkward to judge", Entwistle claimed, citing the at-the-time recently released Helen Vendler's Seamus Heaney and Neil Corcoran's The Poetry of Seamus Heaney having both opposing analysis and methodology in their poetic criticism. Heaney's apparent refusal "to simplify" his poetry is seen by Entwistle as another reason for the ongoing debate around Heaney's work, making it seem "provocatively inscrutable". Due to the books span, Entwistle argued Heaney's focus can be seen narrowing in Seeing Things and The Spirit Level. The final poem, "Postscript", is seen as an "ironic, self-reference" to the title of the collection, Entwistle concluded.

== Bibliography ==
- Allison, Jonathan (March 1, 1999). "Poet in transition captured in 'Open Ground'". Chicago Tribune. p. 45.
- Brandes, Rand (September 27, 1998). "From the opened ground". The News and Observer.
- Brown, Duncan (1989). "Seamus Heaney's 'Book of Changes': "The Haw Lantern"". Theoria: A Journal of Social and Political Theory (74): 79–96. ISSN 0040-5817. JSTOR 41803802.
- Cavanagh, Michael (1993). "Seamus Heaney's Dante: Making a Party of Oneself". Lectura Dantis (12): 7–15. ISSN 0897-5280. JSTOR 44806509.
- Crowder, Ashby Bland (2017). "Christmas Greetings from Seamus Heaney". New Hibernia Review. 21 (3): 34–58. ISSN 1092-3977. JSTOR 44807304.
- Cobb, Ann (1999). "Review of Opened Ground: Poems 1966-1996; Seamus Heaney". Harvard Review (16): 108–110. ISSN 1077-2901. JSTOR 27561222.
- Dawson, Romy (2021). "Rural and Pastoral Themes in Heaney's Poetry". Studies: An Irish Quarterly Review. 110 (440): 470–479. ISSN 0039-3495. JSTOR 27135637.
- Donoghue, Denis (December 2, 1979). "'Field Work'". The New York Times. Archived from the original on September 21, 2006.
- Entwistle, Alice (2000). "Heaney Exposed?". The Cambridge Quarterly. 29 (2): 165–171. doi:10.1093/camqtly/29.2.165. ISSN 0008-199X. JSTOR 42968063.
- Faber and Faber. "Opened Ground by Seamus Heaney". Faber and Faber.
- Foster, Roy (2020). On Seamus Heaney. Princeton University Press. ISBN 978-0-691-21147-3.
- Hart, Henry (1989). "Seamus Heaney's Anxiety of Trust in "Field Work"". Chicago Review. 36 (3/4): 87–108. doi:10.2307/25305467. ISSN 0009-3696. JSTOR 25305467.
- Heaney, Seamus (1998). "Author's Note". Opened Ground: Poems 1966–1996.
- Hunter, Jefferson (1992). "The Borderline of Poetry". The Virginia Quarterly Review. 68 (4): 801–808. ISSN 0042-675X. JSTOR 26437334.
- Ireland, Corydon (May 24, 2012). "A poem for Harvard". The Harvard Gazette.
- Kakutani, Michiko (November 16, 1998). "In a Lyric Vision, Danger Casts a Long Shadow". The New York Times. Gale A150111474.
- Keane, Patrick J. (April 13, 2014). ""Second Thoughts" in Seamus Heaney's North: From "Antaeus" to "Hercules and Antaeus" to "Exposure"". Numéro Cinq.
- Klein, Mariel A.; Nicholls, Olivia A. (November 7, 2013). "Students, Professors Celebrate Life of Seamus Heaney". The Harvard Crimson.
- McDonald, Marianne (September 19, 2019), "Seamus Heaney", Seamus Heaney and the Classics, Oxford University Press, pp. 121–146, doi:10.1093/oso/9780198805656.003.0009, ISBN 978-0-19-880565-6
- Parini, Jay (1980). "Seamus Heaney: The Ground Possessed". The Southern Review. 16: 100–123.
- Perkins, David (1996). "Sounds of Seamus Heaney". Harvard Review (10): 63–69. ISSN 1077-2901. JSTOR 27560612.
- Pratt, William (1999). "Review of Opened Ground: Selected Poems 1966-1996". World Literature Today. 73 (3): 534. doi:10.2307/40154945. ISSN 0196-3570. JSTOR 40154945.
- Quinlan, Kieran (1995). "Tracing Seamus Heaney". World Literature Today. 69 (1): 63–68. doi:10.2307/40150859. ISSN 0196-3570. JSTOR 40150859.
- Quinlan, Kieran (1983). "Unearthing a Terrible Beauty: Seamus Heaney's Victims of Violence". World Literature Today. 57 (3): 365–369. doi:10.2307/40138815. ISSN 0196-3570.
- Reece, Shelley C. (1992). "Seamus Heaney's Search for the True North". Pacific Coast Philology. 27 (1/2): 93–101. doi:10.2307/1316716. ISSN 0078-7469. JSTOR 1316716.
- Redmond, John (September 19, 1998). "A lesson in verse". The Guardian. p. 49.
- Temple, Emily (May 16, 2023). "Watch Ben Whishaw read Seamus Heaney's translation of "The Names of the Hare."".
- Vendler, Helen (2015). "Seamus Justin Heaney: 13 April 1939 · 30 August 2013". Proceedings of the American Philosophical Society. 159 (2): 233–240. ISSN 0003-049X. JSTOR 24640220.
- Vendler, Helen (2000). Seamus Heaney (2. print ed.). Harvard University Press. ISBN 978-0-674-00205-0.
- Vendler, Helen (1996). "Poetry: Seamus Heaney". The Wilson Quarterly. 20 (1): 93–100. ISSN 0363-3276. JSTOR 40259304.
