= New Selected Poems 1966–1987 =

- First edition
- Author: Seamus Heaney
- Language: English
- Publisher: Faber and Faber
- Publication date: 1990
- Publication place: United Kingdom
- Media type: Print
- Pages: 245
- ISBN: 0-571-14372-5 (hardback); ISBN 0-571-14372-5 (paperback)
- OCLC: 315574259
- Dewey Decimal: 821/.914 20
- LC Class: PR6058.E2 A6 1990

New Selected Poems 1966–1987 is a poetry collection by Seamus Heaney, who received the 1995 Nobel Prize in Literature. It was published in 1990 (see 1990 in poetry) by Faber and Faber. It includes selections from each of Heaney's seven first volumes of verse:

- Death of a Naturalist (1966)
- Door into the Dark (1969)
- Wintering Out (1972)
- North (1975)
- Field Work (1979)
- Station Island (1984)
- The Haw Lantern (1987)

It also includes several prose poems from Heaney's limited volume Stations (1975), as well as excerpts from Sweeney Astray (1983), Heaney's verse translation of the Irish legend Buile Shuibhne. The collection includes poems such as "The Haw Lantern", "Mid-Term Break", "Follower" and "Clearances".
