= 1995 Nobel Prize in Literature =

- Seamus Heaney
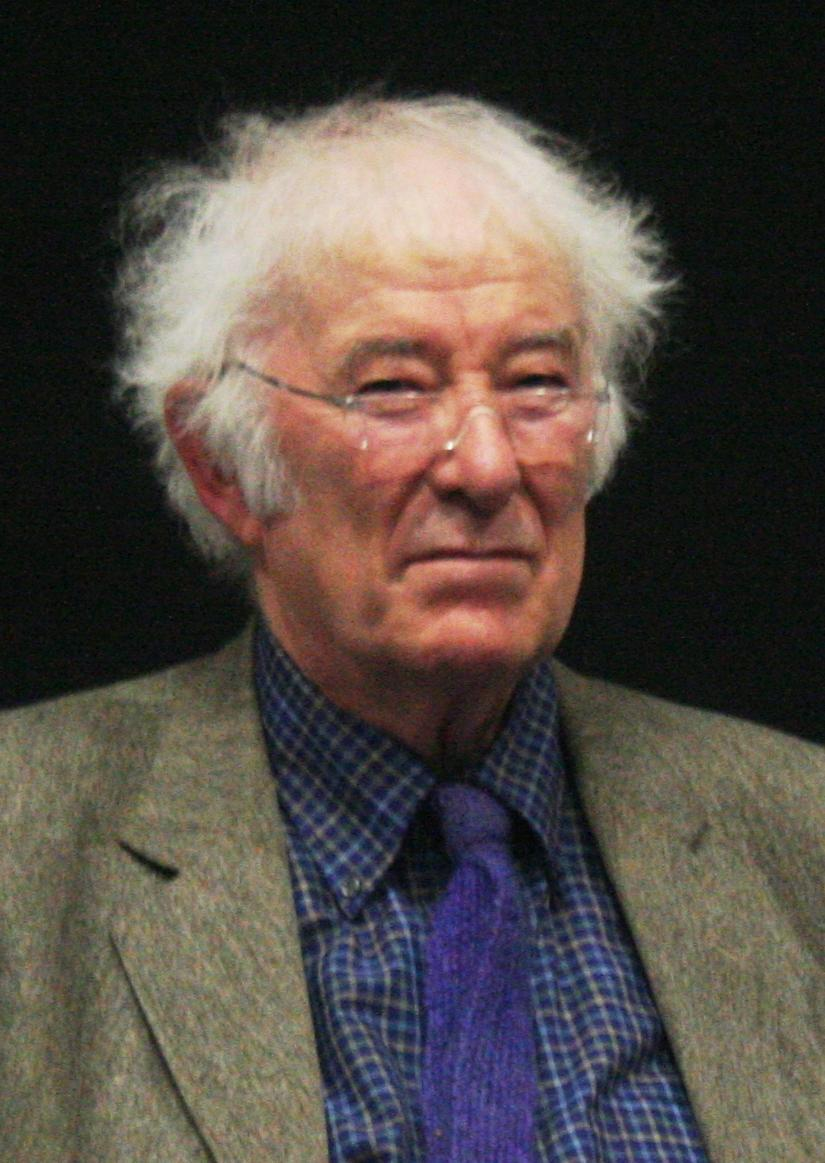
- "for works of lyrical beauty and ethical depth, which exalt everyday miracles and the living past."
- Date: 5 October 1995 (announcement); 10 December 1995 (ceremony)
- Location: Stockholm, Sweden
- Presented by: Swedish Academy
- First award: 1901
- Website: Official website

The 1995 Nobel Prize in Literature was awarded to the Irish poet Seamus Heaney (1939–2013) "for works of lyrical beauty and ethical depth, which exalt everyday miracles and the living past." He is the fourth Irish Nobel laureate after the playwright Samuel Beckett in 1969.

== Laureate ==
Seamus Heaney's poetry is often down-to-earth where he paints the gray and damp Irish landscape. His poems are often connected with daily experiences, but they also derive motifs from history, back to prehistoric times. Heaney's profound interest in the Celtic and the pre-Christian as well as in Catholic literary tradition has found expression in a number of essays and translations such as The Cure at Troy (1990) and Beowulf: A New Verse Translation (1999). Among his best-known collections include Death of a Naturalist (1966), Wintering Out (1972), North (1975), Station Island (1984), The Haw Lantern (1987), and The Spirit Level (1996).

== Reactions ==
He was on holiday in Greece with his wife when the news broke. Neither journalists nor his own children could reach him until he arrived at Dublin Airport two days later, although an Irish television camera traced him to Kalamata. Asked how he felt to have his name added to the Irish Nobel pantheon of W. B. Yeats, George Bernard Shaw and Samuel Beckett, Heaney responded: "It's like being a little foothill at the bottom of a mountain range. You hope you just live up to it. It's extraordinary." He and his wife Marie were immediately taken from the airport to Áras an Uachtaráin for champagne with President Mary Robinson. He would refer to the prize discreetly as "the N thing" in personal exchanges with others.

Tommie Gorman risked a massive $3,000 to hire a helicopter to trace Heaney in Athens - the ploy worked and he had an exclusive interview with the new Nobel laureate.

== Nobel lecture ==
Seamus Heaney delivered his Nobel lecture at the Swedish Academy on 7 December 1995. Entitled Crediting Poetry he spoke about the dynamic of the external reality and the inner world of the poet:

I credit it ultimately because poetry can make an order as true to the impact of external reality and as sensitive to the inner laws of the poet's being as the ripples that rippled in and rippled out across the water in that scullery bucket fifty years ago. An order where we can at last grow up to that which we stored up as we grew. An order which satisfies all that is appetitive in the intelligence and prehensile in the affections. I credit poetry, in other words, both for being itself and for being a help, for making possible a fluid and restorative relationship between the mind's centre and its circumference, between the child gazing at the word "Stockholm" on the face of the radio dial and the man facing the faces that he meets in Stockholm at this most privileged moment. I credit it because credit is due to it, in our time and in all time, for its truth to life, in every sense of that phrase.

== Award ceremony ==
At the award ceremony in Stockholm on 10 December 1995, Östen Sjöstrand of the Swedish Academy said:

Seamus Heaney comes from a humble, farming community, but at the same time we meet in him a learned poet who in the very microcosm of language cultivates and reveals the Celtic, pre-Christian and Catholic literary heritage. He does this in his poetry, and in five collections of eminently readable essays (...) [His poems and essays is] not infrequently in the spirit of his compatriot and great predecessor Patrick Kavanagh's principle: the local can articulate the universal... God is in the bits and pieces of the Everyday.
