= Seamus Heaney Collected Poems =

Audio recording of Irish poet Seamus Heaney reading his own work (2009)

Collected Poems

Studio album by Seamus Heaney
- Recorded: 2009
- Genre: Poetry
- Label: RTÉ with the Lannan Foundation

Collected Poems is a spoken-word recording of the Nobel Prize-winning poet Seamus Heaney reading his own work. It was released by RTÉ to mark his 70th birthday, which occurred on 13 April 2009. The fifteen-CD boxed set spans 556 tracks in over twelve hours of oral performance by the poet (some poems span multiple tracks). The entire work was also released on one disc in MP3 format.

All of Heaney's poetry collections are performed except his final one, Human Chain, which was published in the following year. The poems are presented in the chronological order of Heaney's first eleven poetry collections. (Note: Heaney's first printed collection was a 1965 pamphlet called Eleven Poems; all but one of these works appeared again in his first book collection proper, Death of a Naturalist.) A 58-page essay about Heaney by Irish poet Peter Sirr is included in a booklet.

== Collection summary ==
- Disc 01: Death of a Naturalist – 1966
- Disc 02: Door into the Dark – 1969
- Disc 03: Wintering Out – 1972
- Disc 04: North – 1975
- Disc 05: Field Work – 1979
- Disc 06: Station Island – 1984 (disc one)
- Disc 07: Station Island – 1984 (disc two)
- Disc 08: The Haw Lantern – 1987
- Disc 09: Seeing Things – 1991 (disc one)
- Disc 10: Seeing Things – 1991 (disc two)
- Disc 11: The Spirit Level – 1996 (disc one)
- Disc 12: The Spirit Level – 1996 (disc two)
- Disc 13: Electric Light – 2001 (disc one)
- Disc 14: Electric Light – 2001 (disc two)
- Disc 15: District and Circle – 2006

== Complete track listing ==
(Track information source)

Disc 1: Death of a Naturalist – 1966

01. Digging
02. Death of a Naturalist
03. The Barn
04. An Advancement of Learning
05. Blackberry-Picking
06. Churning Day
07. The Early Purges
08. Follower
09. Ancestral Photograph
10. Mid-Term Break
11. Dawn Shoot
12. At a Potato Digging i
13. At a Potato Digging ii
14. At a Potato Digging iii
15. At a Potato Digging iv
16. For the Commander of the 'Eliza'
17. The Diviner
18. Turkeys Observed
19. Cow in Calf
20. Trout
21. Waterfall
22. Docker
23. Poor Women in a City Church
24. Gravities
25. Twice Shy
26. Valediction
27. Lovers on Aran
28. Poem
29. Honeymoon Flight
30. Scaffolding
31. Storm on the Island
32. Synge on Aran
33. Saint Francis and the Birds
34. In Small Townlands
35. The Folk Singers
36. The Play Way
37. Personal Helicon

Disc 2: Door into the Dark – 1969

01. Night-Piece
02. Gone
03. Dream
04. The Outlaw
05. The Salmon Fisher to the Salmon
06. The Forge
07. Thatcher
08. The Peninsula
09. In Gallarus Oratory
10. Girls Bathing, Galway, 1965
11. Requiem for the Croppies
12. Rite of Spring
13. Undine
14. The Wife's Tale
15. Mother
16. Cana Revisited
17. Elegy for a Stillborn Child
18. Victorian Guitar
19. Night Drive
20. At Ardboe Point
21. Relic of Memory
22. A Lough Neagh Sequence 1. Up the Shore
23. A Lough Neagh Sequence 2. Beyond Sargasso
24. A Lough Neagh Sequence 3. Bait
25. A Lough Neagh Sequence 4. Setting
26. A Lough Neagh Sequence 5. Lifting
27. A Lough Neagh Sequence 6. The Return
28. A Lough Neagh Sequence 7. Vision
29. The Given Note
30. Whinlands
31. The Plantation
32. Shoreline
33. Bann Clay
34. Bogland

Disc 3: Wintering Out – 1972

01. For David Hammond and Michael Longley
02. Fodder
03. Bog Oak
04. Anahorish
05. Servant Boy
06. The Last Mummer
07. Land
08. Gifts of Rain
09. Toome
10. Broagh
11. Oracle
12. The Backward Look
13. Traditions
14. A New Song
15. The Other Side
16. The Wool Trade
17. Linen Town
18. A Northern Hoard 1. Roots
19. A Northern Hoard 2. No Man's Land
20. A Northern Hoard 3. Stump
21. A Northern Hoard 4. No Sanctuary
22. A Northern Hoard 5. Tinder
23. Midnight
24. The Tollund man
25. Nerthus
26. Cairn-maker
27. Navvy
28. Veteran's Dream
29. Augury
30. Wedding Day
31. Mother of the Groom
32. Summer Home
33. Serenades
34. Somnambulist
35. A Winter's Tale
36. Shore Woman
37. Maighdean Mara
38. Limbo
39. Bye-Child
40. Good-night
41. First Calf
42. May
43. Fireside
44. Dawn
45. Travel
46. Westering

Disc 4: North – 1975

01. Mossbawn: Two Poems in Dedication to Mary Heaney 1. Sunlight
02. Mossbawn: Two Poems in Dedication to Mary Heaney 2. The Seed
03. Antaeus
04. Belderg
05. Funeral Rites
06. North
07. Viking Dublin: Trial Pieces
08. The Digging Skeleton
09. Bone Dreams i
10. Bone Dreams ii
11. Bone Dreams iii
12. Bone Dreams iv
13. Bone Dreams v
14. Bone Dreams vi
15. Come to the Bower
16. Bog Queen
17. The Grauballe Man
18. Punishment
19. Strange Fruit
20. Kinship i
21. Kinship ii
22. Kinship iii
23. Kinship iv
24. Kinship v
25. Kinship vi
26. Ocean's Love to Ireland
27. Aisling
28. Act of Union
29. The Betrothal of Cavehill
30. Hercules and Antaeus
31. The Unacknowledged Legislator's Dream
32. Whatever You Say Say Nothing i
33. Whatever You Say Say Nothing ii
34. Whatever You Say Say Nothing iii
35. Whatever You Say Say Nothing iv
36. Freedman
37. Singing School (Epigraphs)
38. Singing School 1. The Ministry of Fear
39. Singing School 2. A Constable Calls
40. Singing School 3. Orange Drums, Tyrone, 1966
41. Singing School 4. Summer 1969
42. Singing School 5. Fosterage
43. Singing School 6. Exposure

Disc 5: Field Work – 1979

01. Oysters
02. Triptych I After a Killing
03. Triptych II Sibyl
04. Triptych III At the Water's Edge
05. The Toome Road
06. A Drink of Water
07. The Strand at Lough Beg
08. A Postcard from North Antrim
09. Casualty
10. The Badgers
11. The Singer's House
12. The Guttural Muse
13. In Memoriam Sean O'Riada
14. Elegy
15. Glanmore Sonnets I
16. Glanmore Sonnets II
17. Glanmore Sonnets III
18. Glanmore Sonnets IV
19. Glanmore Sonnets V
20. Glanmore Sonnets VI
21. Glanmore Sonnets VII
22. Glanmore Sonnets VIII
23. Glanmore Sonnets IX
24. Glanmore Sonnets X
25. September Song
26. An Afterwards
27. High Summer
28. The Otter
29. The Skunk
30. Homecomings
31. A Dream of Jealousy
32. Polder
33. Field Work I
34. Field Work II
35. Field Work III
36. Field Work IV
37. Song
38. Leavings
39. The Harvest Bow
40. In Memoriam Francis Ledwidge
41. Ugolino

Disc 6: Station Island – 1984 (disc one)

PART ONE

01. The Underground
02. La Toilette
03. Sloe Gin
04. Away from it All
05. Chekhov on Sakhalin
06. Sandstone Keepsake
07. Shelf Life 1. Granite Chip
08. Shelf Life 2. Old Smoothing Iron
09. Shelf Life 3. Old Pewter
10. Shelf Life 4. Iron Spike
11. Shelf Life 5. Stone from Delphi
12. Shelf Life 6. A Snowshoe
13. A Migration
14. Last Look
15. Remembering Malibu
16. Making Strange
17. The Birthplace
18. Changes
19. An Ulster Twilight
20. A Bat on the Road
21. A Hazel Stick for Catherine Ann
22. A Kite for Michael and Christopher
23. The Railway Children
24. Sweetpea
25. An Aisling in the Burren
26. Widgeon
27. Sheelagh na Gig
28. The Loaning
29. The Sandpit 1. 1946
30. The Sandpit 2. The Demobbed Bricklayer
31. The Sandpit 3. The Sand Boom
32. The Sandpit 4. What the Brick Keeps
33. The King of the Ditchbacks I
34. The King of the Ditchbacks II
35. The King of the Ditchbacks III

Disc 7: Station Island – 1984 (disc two)

PART TWO - STATION ISLAND

01. Station Island I
02. Station Island II
03. Station Island III
04. Station Island IV
05. Station Island V
06. Station Island VI
07. Station Island VII
08. Station Island VIII
09. Station Island IX
10. Station Island X
11. Station Island XI
12. Station Island XII

PART THREE - SWEENEY REDIVIVUS

13. The First Gloss
14. Sweeney Redivivus
15. Unwinding
16. In the Beech
17. The First Kingdom
18. The First Flight
19. Drifting Off
20. Alerted
21. The Cleric
22. The Hermit
23. The Master
24. The Scribes
25. A Waking Dream
26. In the Chestnut Tree
27. Sweeney's Returns
28. Holly
29. An Artist
30. The Old Icons
31. In Illo Tempore
32. On the Road

Disc 8: The Haw Lantern – 1987

01. Alphabets
02. Terminus
03. From the Frontier of Writing
04. The Haw Lantern
05. The Stone Grinder
06. A Daylight Art
07. Parable Island
08. From the Republic of Conscience
09. Hailstones
10. Two Quick Notes
11. The Stone Verdict
12. From the Land of the Unspoken
13. A Ship of Death
14. The Spoonbait
15. In Memoriam: Robert Fitzgerald
16. The Old Team
17. Clearances: In Memoriam M.K.H.
18. Clearances 1
19. Clearances 2
20. Clearances 3
21. Clearances 4
22. Clearances 5
23. Clearances 6
24. Clearances 7
25. Clearances 8
26. The Milk Factory
27. The Summer of Lost Rachel
28. The Wishing Tree
29. A Postcard from Iceland
30. A Peacock's Feather
31. Grotus and Coventina
32. Holding Course
33. The Song of the Bullets
34. Wolfe Tone
35. A Shooting Script
36. From the Canton of Expectation
37. The Mud Vision
38. The Disappearing Island
39. The Riddle

Disc 9: Seeing Things – 1991 (disc one)

01. The Golden Bough

PART I

02. The Journey Back
03. Markings
04. Three Drawings 1. The Point
05. Three Drawings 2. The Pulse
06. Three Drawings 3. A Haul
07. Casting and Gathering
08. Man and Boy
09. Seeing Things I
10. Seeing Things II
11. Seeing Things III
12. The Ash Plant
13. 1.1.87
14. An August Night
15. Field of Vision
16. The Pitchfork
17. A Basket of Chestnuts
18. The Biretta
19. The Settle Bed
20. The Schoolbag
21. Glanmore Revisited 1. Scrabble
22. Glanmore Revisited 2. The Cot
23. Glanmore Revisited 3. Scene Shifts
24. Glanmore Revisited 4. 1973
25. Glanmore Revisited 5. Lustral Sonnet
26. Glanmore Revisited 6. Bedside Reading
27. Glanmore Revisited 7. The Skylight
28. A Pillowed Head
29. A Royal Prospect
30. A Retrospect
31. The Rescue
32. Wheels within Wheels
33. The Sounds of Rain
34. Fosterling

Disc 10: Seeing Things – 1991 (disc two)

PART II - SQUARINGS

1: Lightenings

01. Lightenings i
02. Lightenings ii
03. Lightenings iii
04. Lightenings iv
05. Lightenings v
06. Lightenings vi
07. Lightenings vii
08. Lightenings viii
09. Lightenings ix
10. Lightenings x
11. Lightenings xi
12. Lightenings xii

2: Settings

13. Settings xiii
14. Settings xiv
15. Settings xv
16. Settings xvi
17. Settings xvii
18. Settings xviii
19. Settings xix
20. Settings xx
21. Settings xxi
22. Settings xxii
23. Settings xxiii
24. Settings xxiv

3: Crossings

25. Crossings xxv
26. Crossings xxvi
27. Crossings xxvii
28. Crossings xxviii
29. Crossings xxix
30. Crossings xxx
31. Crossings xxxi
32. Crossings xxxii
33. Crossings xxxiii
34. Crossings xxxiv
35. Crossings xxxv
36. Crossings xxxvi

4. Squarings

37. Squarings xxxvii
38. Squarings xxxviii
39. Squarings xxxix
40. Squarings xl
41. Squarings xli
42. Squarings xlii
43. Squarings xliii
44. Squarings xliv
45. Squarings xlv
46. Squarings xlvi
47. Squarings xlvii
48. Squarings xlviii
49. The Crossing

Disc 11: The Spirit Level – 1996 (disc one)

01. The Rain Stick
02. To a Dutch Potter in Ireland 1.
03. To a Dutch Potter in Ireland 2. After Liberation
04. A Brigid's Girdle
05. Mint
06. A Sofa in the Forties
07. Keeping Going
08. Two Lorries
09. Damson
10. Weighing In
11. St Kevin and the Blackbird
12. The Flight Path 1
13. The Flight Path 2
14. The Flight Path 3
15. The Flight Path 4
16. The Flight Path 5
17. The Flight Path 6
18. An Invocation
19. Mycenae Lookout 1. The Watchman's War
20. Mycenae Lookout 2. Cassandra
21. Mycenae Lookout 3. His Dawn Vision
22. Mycenae Lookout 4. The Nights
23. Mycenae Lookout 5. The Reverie of Water

Disc 12: The Spirit Level – 1996 (disc two)

01. The First Words
02. The Gravel Walks
03. Whitby-sur-Moyola
04. The Thimble
05. The Butter-Print
06. Remembered Columns
07. 'Poet's Chair'
08. The Swing
09. The Poplar
10. Two Stick Drawings (1)
11. Two Stick Drawings (2)
12. A Call
13. The Errand
14. A Dog Was Crying Tonight in Wicklow Also
15. M.
16. An Architect
17. The Sharping Stone
18. The Strand
19. The Walk
20. At the Wellhead
21. At Banagher
22. Tollund
23. Postscript

Disc 13: Electric Light – 2001 (disc one)

I

01. At Toomebridge
02. Perch
03. Lupins
04. Out of the Bag I
05. Out of the Bag II
06. Out of the Bag III
07. Out of the Bag IV
08. Bann Valley Eclogue
09. Montana
10. The Loose Box
11. Turpin Song
12. The Border Campaign
13. Known World
14. The Little Canticles of Asturias 1
15. The Little Canticles of Asturias 2
16. The Little Canticles of Asturias 3
17. Ballynahinch Lake
18. The Clothes Shrine
19. Red, White and Blue 1. Red
20. Red, White and Blue 2. White
21. Red, White and Blue 3. Blue
22. Virgil: Eclogue IX
23. Glanmore Eclogue
24. Sonnets from Hellas 1. Into Arcadia
25. Sonnets from Hellas 2. Conkers
26. Sonnets from Hellas 3. Pylos
27. Sonnets from Hellas 4. The Augean Stables
28. Sonnets from Hellas 5. Castalian Spring
29. Sonnets from Hellas 6. Desfina

Disc 14: Electric Light – 2001 (disc two)

01. The Gaeltacht
02. The Real Name
03. The Bookcase
04. Vitruviana
05. Ten Glosses 1. The Marching Season
06. Ten Glosses 2. The Catechism
07. Ten Glosses 3. The Bridge
08. Ten Glosses 4. A Suit
09. Ten Glosses 5. The Party
10. Ten Glosses 6. W. H. Auden 1907-73
11. Ten Glosses 7. The Lesson
12. Ten Glosses 8. Moling's Gloss
13. Ten Glosses 9. Colly
14. Ten Glosses 10. A Norman Simile
15. The Fragment

II

16. On His Work in the English Tongue 1
17. On His Work in the English Tongue 2
18. On His Work in the English Tongue 3
19. On His Work in the English Tongue 4
20. On His Work in the English Tongue 5
21. Audenesque
22. To the Shade of Zbigniew Herbert
23. "Would They Had Stay'd"
24. Late in the Day
25. Arion
26. Bodies and Souls
27. Clonmany to Ahascragh
28. Sruth
29. Seeing the Sick
30. Electric Light

Disc 15: District and Circle – 2006

01. The Turnip-Snedder
02. A Shiver
03. Polish Sleepers
04. Anahorish 1944
05. To Mick Joyce in Heaven
06. The Aerodrome
07. Anything Can Happen
08. Helmet
09. Out of Shot
10. Rilke: After the Fire
11. District and Circle (1)
12. District and Circle (2)
13. District and Circle (3)
14. District and Circle (4)
15. District and Circle (5)
16. To George Seferis in the Underworld
17. Wordsworth's Skates
18. The Harrow-Pin
19. Poet to Blacksmith
20. Midnight Anvil
21. Súgán
22. Senior Infants 1. The Sally Rod
23. Senior Infants 2. A Chow
24. Senior Infants 3. One Christmas Day in the Morning
25. The Nod
26. A Clip
27. Edward Thomas on the Lagans Road
28. Found Prose 1. The Lagans Road
29. Found Prose 2. Tall Dames
30. Found Prose 3. Boarders
31. The Lift
32. Nonce Words
33. Stern
34. Out of This World 1. "Like everybody else..."
35. Out of This World 2. Brancardier
36. Out of This World 3. Saw Music
37. In Iowa
38. Höfn
39. On the Spot
40. The Tollund Man in Springtime (1)
41. The Tollund Man in Springtime (2)
42. The Tollund Man in Springtime (3)
43. The Tollund Man in Springtime (4)
44. The Tollund Man in Springtime (5)
45. The Tollund Man in Springtime (6)
46. Moyulla
47. Planting the Alder
48. Tate's Avenue
49. A Hagging Match
50. Fiddleheads
51. To Pablo Neruda in Tamlaghtduff
52. Home Help 1. Helping Sarah
53. Home Help 2. Chairing Mary
54. Rilke: The Apple Orchard
55. Quitting Time
56. Home Fires 1. A Scuttle for Dorothy Wordsworth
57. Home Fires 2. A Stove Lid for W. H. Auden
58. The Birch Grove
59. Cavafy: "The rest I'll speak of to the ones below in Hades"
60. In a Loaning
61. The Blackbird of Glanmore
