= 21st century in poetry =

== Chronology of the 21st century in poetry ==
=== 2020s ===
- 2021 in poetry
- 2020 in poetry - Lana Del Rey's Violet Bent Backwards Over the Grass

=== 2010s ===
- 2019 in poetry
- 2018 in poetry
- 2017 in poetry
- 2016 in poetry
- 2015 in poetry
- 2014 in poetry Death of Madeline Gins, Amiri Baraka, Juan Gelman, José Emilio Pacheco, Maya Angelou
- 2013 in poetry Death of Thomas McEvilley, Taylor Mead, Seamus Heaney
- 2012 in poetry Günter Grass's poem "What Must Be Said" leads to him being declared persona non grata; Death of Adrienne Rich, Wisława Szymborska
- 2011 in poetry Tomas Tranströmer awarded the Nobel Prize in Literature; Liz Lochhead succeeds Edwin Morgan as The Scots Makar; Death of Josephine Hart, Václav Havel, Robert Kroetsch
- 2010 in poetry Seamus Heaney's Human Chain; Death of Tuli Kupferberg, Peter Orlovsky, P. Lal, Edwin Morgan

=== 2000s ===
- 2009 in poetry Turkish government posthumously restores Nâzım Hikmet's citizenship, stripped from him because of his political views; Ruth Padel the first woman elected Oxford Professor of Poetry, only to resign in controversy before taking office; Carol Ann Duffy succeeds Andrew Motion as the UK's Poet Laureate; Elizabeth Alexander reads "Praise Song for the Day" at presidential inauguration of U.S. President Barack Obama; Death of Dennis Brutus, Jim Carroll, Nicholas Hughes (son of Ted Hughes and Sylvia Plath)
- 2008 in poetry Death of Harold Pinter, Jonathan Williams
- 2007 in poetry Death of William Morris Meredith, Jr., Emmett Williams
- 2006 in poetry Seamus Heaney's District and Circle; Death of Stanley Kunitz
- 2005 in poetry Harold Pinter awarded the Nobel Prize in Literature; Death of Philip Lamantia, Robert Creeley
- 2004 in poetry Seamus Heaney reads "Beacons of Bealtaine" for 25 leaders of the enlarged European Union; Edwin Morgan named as The Scots Makar; Death of Janet Frame, Jackson Mac Low, Czesław Miłosz
- 2003 in poetry John Paul II's Roman Triptych (Meditation); Kenneth Rexroth's Complete Poems (posthumous)
- 2002 in poetry Death of Kenneth Koch
- 2001 in poetry Seamus Heaney's Electric Light; First-ever Griffin Poetry Prize in Canada; Death of Gregory Corso
- 2000 in poetry Death of Yehuda Amichai, Ahmad Shamlou
