= The Bog People =

Scientific publication about bog body finds

The Bog People: Iron-Age Man Preserved
- The English-language first edition cover of the book, depicting the head of Tollund Man.
- Author: P. V. Glob.
- Language: Danish; English (trans.)
- Subject: Archaeology; Bog bodies
- Publisher: Gyldendal, Faber and Faber
- Publication date: 1965
- Publication place: United Kingdom
- English publication date: 1969
- Media type: Print (hardback & paperback)

The Bog People: Iron-Age Man Preserved is an archaeological study of the bog bodies of Northern Europe written by the Danish archaeologist P. V. Glob. First published in 1965 by Gyldendal under the Danish title of Mosefolket: Jernalderens Mennesker bevaret i 2000 År, it was translated into English by the English archaeologist Rupert Bruce-Mitford and published by Faber and Faber in 1969. In 1966 it was translated into German by Thyra Dohrenburg and published by Winkler Verlag Munich under the title Die Schläfer im Moor (English: The Sleepers in the Bog).

The Bog People is divided into six chapters. The first is devoted to Tollund Man, and the second to Grauballe Man, two of the best known Iron Age bog bodies to have been discovered in Jutland, Denmark. The third and fourth chapters are devoted to the wider context of bog bodies first in Denmark and then in other parts of Europe. The final two chapters are devoted to a wider exposition of life and death in Iron Age Denmark.

Glob's book received positive reviews from both Barry Cunliffe in Nature and Ralph M. Rowlett in American Anthropologist. They praised Glob's arguments as well as his writing style and use of illustrations, alongside Bruce-Mitford's translation. In subsequent decades, it has received both praise and criticism from specialists in the field, who have lauded the publicity which it brought to the subject, but rejected many of Glob's conclusions as being based on insufficient evidence.

== Synopsis ==
Chapter one, "The Tollund Man", is devoted to the bog body of the same name that was discovered in 1950 in Tollund Fell, Bjaeldskov Dal in Jutland, Denmark. Glob discusses the excavation of the corpse, and his own personal involvement with the operation. Outlining the find's removal to the National Museum of Denmark in Copenhagen, he then outlines the manner in which the head was conserved for public display at the Silkeborg Museum. Alongside this he also discusses the archaeological context of Tollund Man, examining the manner in which he was executed, his clothing, and the contents of his last meal. The second chapter, entitled "The Grauballe Man", deals with the eponymous bog body found in 1952 at Nebelgård Fen, located 11 miles (18 km) east of Tolland. Like with the previous chapter, Glob discusses his own personal investigation into the body, outlining its discovery and conservation, as well as the context of his death and burial.

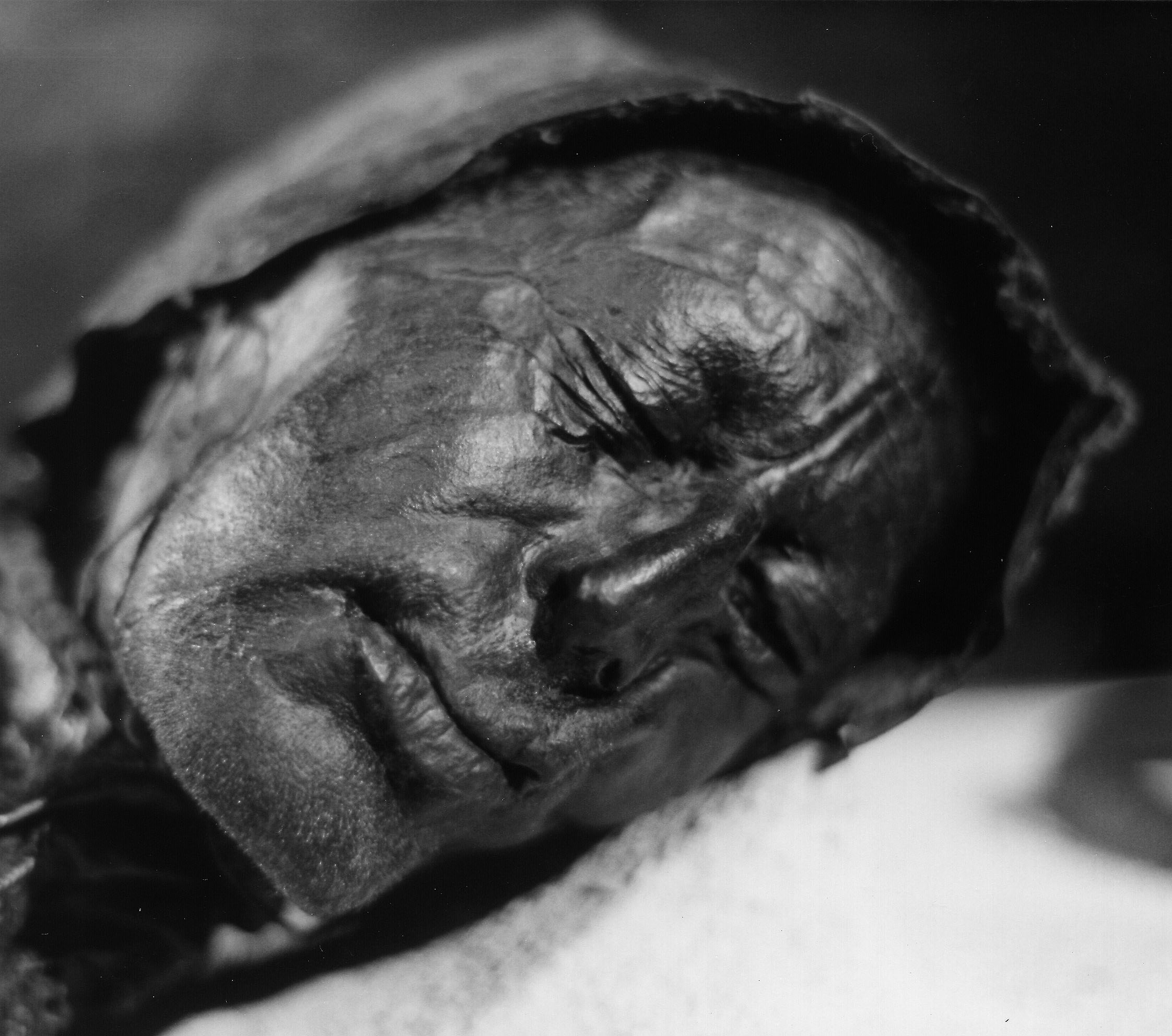
Tolland Man, one of the Danish corpses discussed by Glob.

In the third chapter, "Bog People in Denmark", Glob notes that there have been over 150 bog bodies found in Denmark, and proceeds to provide a number of examples including Haraldskær Woman and the Borremose bodies, in doing so highlighting the similarities that exist between them. Noting that many of these were discovered in the 19th and early 20th centuries, he explains that little can be known about most of them because methods of archaeological investigation and conservation were unavailable at the time. Chapter four, "Bog People in Other Countries", explores similar bog bodies which have been discovered in neighbouring Germany and the Netherlands, such as Windeby I, making reference to the cataloging project undertaken by the German archaeologist Alfred Dieck.

"How They Lived" is the title of the fifth chapter, and explores the wider context of life in Iron Age Denmark, dealing with such issues as class divisions, houses and garments. The final chapter, "When Death Came", looks at the place of death in Iron Age Denmark, outlining ordinary funerary remains, which include both cremation and inhumation. Contrasting these methods of dealing with the dead to the corpses left in the bogs, he argues that the latter must represent evidence for a widespread tradition of human sacrifice devoted to a fertility goddess, citing the writings of Tacitus as evidence.

== Reception ==
=== Academic reviews ===
The Nature journal published a review provided by the English archaeologist Barry Cunliffe of the University of Southampton. He expresses only one disappointment with Glob's work, that there is what he sees as a lack of information on the daily life and social structure of Iron Age Denmark. He nevertheless feels compensated by the final chapter, which he describes as representing Glob "at his best, building-up, in detective-style fashion", a picture of ritual behavior in the Iron Age. Praising the use of photographs as "brilliant", he refers to the "attractive" translation of Bruce-Mitford, and considers the overall effect to be "stimulating and provocative". Summarizing The Bog People, he labels it a "splendid book, full of detail and fascination" for both specialists and a wider readership interested in archaeology.

Ralph M. Rowlett of the University of Missouri wrote a review of The Bog People for the journal American Anthropologist. He began his review by describing his background interest in bog bodies, and highlighting that he had married one of Glob's graduate students. He proceeds to note that there is much in the book that would be of interest to anthropologists, and he hoped that they would not be put off by its use of "gossip and anecdote" and its "intensely personal and culturally ultra-Danish tone", which he attributes to Glob's attempts to reach a wider, non-academic audience. Praising Glob's use of ethnohistory and epic literature to illuminate the Early Iron Age, he claims that The Bog People represents "one of the best modern ethnographic descriptions of the North Germani of that era" and that it furthermore provides evidence in support of Tacitus' claims. Rowlett goes on to praise Bruce-Mitford's translation, but believes that he has a "slight tendency to over-translate" with place names, and also disagrees with his decision to convert centimeters into inches. Ending his review, Rowlett notes that along with Alfred Deick's catalog of bog bodies, The Bog People represented "a starter for a by no means exhausted field."

=== Wider reception ===
In an academic paper discussing the bog bodies which was published in 1995, C.S. Briggs criticised Glob for jumping to conclusions that were not supported by the evidence, exclaiming "Can Glob's book today actually pass muster as responsible popular scholarship?". In particular, they highlighted that he ascribed many bodies to the Iron Age when they had not been securely carbon dated and that he overconfidently proclaimed the Drumkeeragh Lady from Medieval Ireland to be a Danish Viking despite a lack of supporting evidence.

"The magnetism of Glob's text lies not only in the sensationalism of its subject but in its narrative style, its mixture of scientific-archaeological discourse and mythological-poetic narration, and not least its use of photography ... Deeply influenced by historical imaging but also aware of contemporary public fascination, Glob summons forth specters of the past, which speak not only to popular imagination but to the strategies of archaeological imagination."

— Karin Sanders, 2009.

In his 1996 book on bog bodies, Wijnand Van der Sanden paid homage to Glob's The Bog Bodies, describing it as a "highly accessible work" which had done more than any other to bring publicity to the bog cadavers. Exclaiming that he was filled with admiration for the work, he noted that he wished that he himself had written it 30 years before. In their 2007 edited volume on the reinvestigation of Grauballe Man, Pauline Asingh and Niels Lynnerup stated that Glob's book had represented a "major contribution" to the study of bog bodies which "awoke many people's interest in prehistory".

Nobel Prize-winning Irish poet Seamus Heaney wrote a series of poems inspired by the book, finding contemporary political relevance in the relics of the ritualistic killings. Heaney's poem The Tollund Man, published in his Wintering Out collection, compares the ritual sacrifice to those who died in the sectarian violence of "the Troubles."

In her 2009 study of the cultural and artistic reception of the bog bodies, Karin Sanders noted that she had first become interested in archaeology through reading a copy of Mosefolket in her primary school's library, near Copenhagen. Proceeding to describe the book as "a classic", she noted that even in the 21st century, it continued to offer the "source book" for artistic expressions of bog bodies. Proceeding to explore the influence of Glob's tome, she noted that many artists and writers had used it as a basis for learning more about the bog bodies, to whom their works were dedicated, and that Glob himself had successfully blended an engaging narrative with archaeological information, and that he was "profoundly influenced by the potentiality of interaction between fact and fiction."
