= The Cure at Troy =

Verse adaptation by Seamus Heaney of Sophocles' play Philoctetes

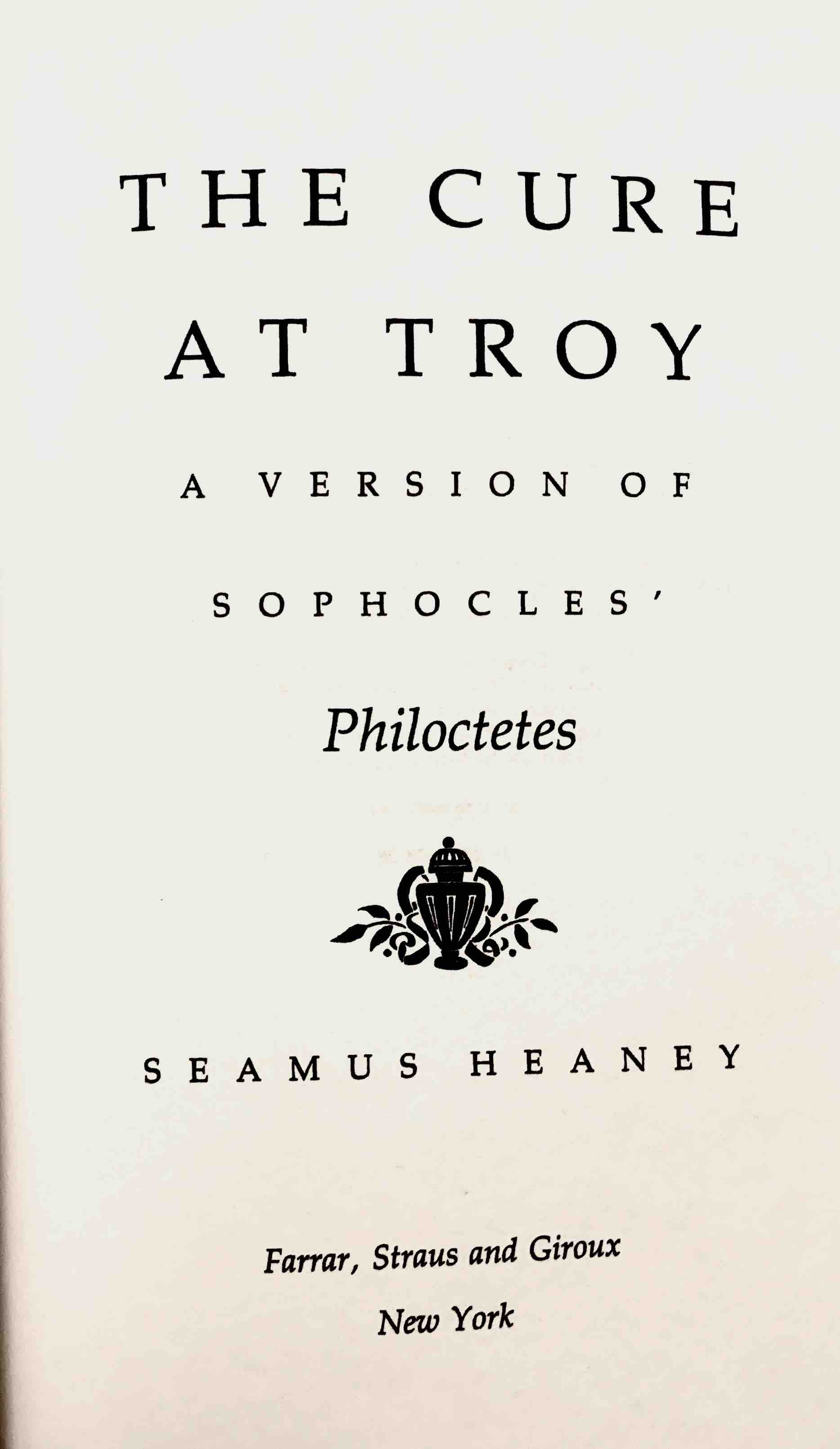
- Frontispiece from the Farrar, Straus and Giroux first American edition.
- Author: Seamus Heaney
- Language: English
- Set in: Homeric Age
- Publisher: Farrar, Straus, and Giroux
- Publication date: 1990
- Media type: Print
- Pages: 96
- ISBN: 0374522898
- Preceded by: The Haw Lantern
- Followed by: Seeing Things

The Cure at Troy: A Version of Sophocles' Philoctetes is a verse adaptation by Seamus Heaney of Sophocles' play Philoctetes. It was first published in 1991. The story comes from one of the myths relating to the Trojan War. It is dedicated in memory of poet and translator Robert Fitzgerald.

== Characters ==
- Odysseus
- Neoptolemus
- Philoctetes
- Chorus
- Chorus Leader
- Sentry
- Merchant (in disguise)
- Hercules (in person of chorus leader)

== Premise ==
The story takes place in the closing days of the Trojan War. Before the play begins, the Greek archer Philoctetes has been abandoned on the island of Lemnos by his fellows because of a foul-smelling wound on his foot, and his agonised cries. The play opens with verses from the Chorus and the arrival of Odysseus and Neoptolemus to the shore of Lemnos. Their mission is to devise a plan to obtain the mighty bow of Philoctetes, without which, it has been foretold, they cannot win the Trojan War.

== Themes ==
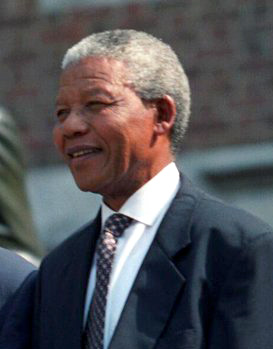
Nelson Mandela and the South African Apartheid were thematic inspiration for Heaney's version of Philoctetes

At the beginning of the play, the protagonist Philoctetes has been abandoned on an island with a wound that will not heal. His suffering and exposure to the elements have made him animal-like, a quality he shares with other outcasts in Heaney's work, such as Sweeney.

Narratives relating to the Trojan War had attracted Heaney and other Irish poets, sometimes for its resonance with the Northern Ireland conflict. Heaney also reworked The Testament of Cresseid, and had drawn on the Oresteia of Aeschylus for his sequence of poems "Mycenae Lookout".

Heaney's version is well known for its lines:

History says, Don't hope
On this side of the grave.
But then, once in a lifetime
The longed-for tidal wave
Of justice can rise up,
And hope and history rhyme.

The passage was quoted by Bill Clinton in his remarks to the community in Derry in 1995 during the Northern Ireland Peace Process.

Joe Biden has also frequently quoted the passage, including in his presidential acceptance speech at the 2020 Democratic National Convention and at the memorial service for Sean Collier, a campus police officer who was killed in the line of duty during the aftermath of the Boston Marathon bombing. In the opening chorus of the play, Heaney's translation emphasizes the role of poetry as "the voice of reality and justice" in expressing "terrible events".

The work was recited, in part, by Lin-Manuel Miranda at the inauguration of Joe Biden.

At the time of its composition, Heaney saw themes of the Philoctetes as consonant with the contemporary political situation in South Africa, as the apartheid regime fell and Nelson Mandela was released from prison without a full-scale war. Heaney described Mandela's return as a similar overcoming of betrayal and a display of "the generosity of his coming back and helping with the city—helping the polis to get together again."

== Production history ==
The Cure at Troy was first performed in 1990 by the Field Day Theatre Company. The cast included Seamus Moran as Odysseus, Sean Rocks as Neoptolemus, and Des McAleer as Philoctetes. It was directed by Stephen Rea and Bob Crowley.

The play was adapted for radio and broadcast on 25 July 1993 on BBC Radio 3, with Stephen Rea as Philoctetes, Brendan Gleeson as Neoptolemus and Ian McElhinney as Odysseus.

Cover of the first edition published by Field Day.
