= Rilke: After the Fire =

Poem

Rilke: After The Fire is a poem from Seamus Heaney's 2006 collection District and Circle. The poem is a translation of Rainer Maria Rilke's "Die Brandstätte", from the 1908 edition of Neue Gedichte. It recounts the morning after a fire which has consumed a home, leaving "emptiness behind / Scorched linden trees". When "the son of the place" appears on the scene, he uses a stick to drag "an out-of-shape old can or kettle" from the wreckage, and attempts to tell the others present about his loss. The poem concludes with his realising that "he [is] changed: a foreigner among them". There is one other Rilke translation in District and Circle called "Rilke: The Apple Orchard".
