= Grauballe =

- Village
- Location within Central Denmark Region Location within Denmark
- Coordinates: 56°13′35″N 9°37′49″E
- Country: Denmark
- Region: Central Denmark (Midtjylland)
- Municipality: Silkeborg Municipality

Population (2026)
  - Total: 978

Grauballe is a village in Silkeborg Municipality, Central Denmark Region in Denmark. It is located 8 km northeast of Silkeborg and had a population of 978 (1 January 2026).

The Grauballe Man, a bog body dating from the late 3rd century BC, was uncovered from a peat bog near the village in 1952.
