= Field Work (poetry collection) =

1979 poetry collection by Seamus Heaney

- First edition (Faber and Faber)
- Author: Seamus Heaney
- Language: English
- Publisher: Faber and Faber
- Publication date: 1979
- Media type: Print
- Pages: 80 pp
- ISBN: 9780571114337
- Preceded by: North
- Followed by: Station Island

Field Work (1979) is the fifth poetry collection by Seamus Heaney, who received the 1995 Nobel Prize in Literature.

== Background ==
Field Work was Heaney’s first collection of poetry since his most celebrated collection, North in 1975. Field Work can largely be read as record of Heaney’s four years (1972-1976) living in rural County Wicklow in the Republic of Ireland after leaving the violence of The Troubles. Heaney had previously been living in Belfast as a professor at Queen's University. Denis O’Donoghue has referred to this period as "years of retreat only in the religious or monastic sense, a quiet time for thinking and renewal. Certain themes were sequestered, so that Heaney might start out again from first principles and deep affiliations." Joshua Weiner writes: "While the move south seemed to some a deliberate withdrawal from a previous political commitment to fight the British presence in Ireland, Field Work indicates rather a growing commitment to stay engaged, but to do so by maintaining the long view, which asks questions more than it assumes positions."

In a 1981 interview with Frank Kinahan, Heaney said Field Work "was an attempt to try to do something deliberately: to change the note and to lengthen the line, and to bring elements of my social self, elements of my usual nature, which is more convivial than most of the poems before that might suggest, to try to bring all that into play.

=== Title ===
Dr. Rand Brandes tells the story of the title Field Work in The Cambridge Companion to Seamus Heaney. Heaney originally wanted to name the work “Polder.” His editor, Charles Monteith, insisted that Heaney change the title because readers may not be able to pronounce the word. Heaney then wanted the title “Easter Water,” but this name was also discarded in favor of the final name: Field Work. Heaney said of the final title: "I gave Field Work that title partly because there’s an element of samplings in it. But I think there’s an opener note in it as well. What holds Field Work together—this is only my view of it—is a certain ease of the voice." Heaney also provided his own explanation of how all his titles came about: “What usually happens is that I start to look for one [a title] once a ‘critical mass’ of poems gets written. I find that if I have a working title at that stage – say when half a volume is in existence – the title itself can help in shaping, or at least inclining and suggesting, the poems to come.”

== Reception ==
In a review for The New York Times, O’Donoghue called Field Work: “a superb book, the most eloquent and far-reaching book he has written, a perennial poetry offered at a time when many of us have despaired of seeing such a thing."

Field Work is notably less political than North. O’Donoghue writes: “Readers who want Heaney to go on writing political poems, as in North, may be disappointed with Field Work."

In an interview with Henri Cole in the Fall 1997 volume of The Paris Review, Heaney describes this collection: "But even if Field Work was less obsessive, more formally rangy, full of public elegies and personal love poems and those Glanmore sonnets, it was still a proof that I could write poetry in my new situation." He also calls Field Work “one of my favorites. In its own way it was a book of change also; it moved me from the intensity of North to something more measured, in both formal and emotional terms."

In the same interview, Heaney also said: “I tried very deliberately in Field Work to turn from a broody, phonetically self-relishing kind of writing to something closer to my own speaking voice. And I think that from Field Work onwards I have been following that direction. It's a very different kind of linguistic ambition now from what I was after in Death of a Naturalist or Wintering Out or North.

Not all reviews, however, were favorable. In the New York Review of Books, Al Alvarez calls Heaney an “intensely literary writer” and writes that the “reticence and self-containment” seen in North are not present in Field Work." Despite complimenting Heaney’s “real strength and originality” in “modest, perfect little poems," the review was notably unfavorable.

Alvarez commented: “In the circumstances, his current reputation amounts, I think, to a double betrayal: it lumbers him with expectations which he may not fulfill and which might even sink him, if he were less resilient; at the same time, it reinforces the British audience in their comfortable prejudice that poetry, give or take a few quirks of style, has not changed essentially in the last hundred years."

Alvarez went on to say: “If Heaney really is the best we can do, then the whole troubled, exploratory thrust of modern poetry has been a diversion from the right true way.”

Upon Heaney’s death in August 2013, Sean O’Hagan wrote for The Guardian: “Field Work spoke of a world I knew and had just left behind, physically if not emotionally or psychologically…This was poetry I could connect with on several levels, about strange things I had seen with my own eyes and was now seeing through his.”

Blake Morrison likewise wrote in The Guardian after Heaney's death that in Field Work, Heaney "presents himself as a wood-kerne escaped from the massacre, a man who has left the urban battlefront for Wordsworthian seclusion or Ovidian exile."

== Poems ==
George Cusack notes: "The structure of Field Work divides the collection into three thematic units, the first beginning with "Oysters," the first poem in the collection and continuing through "Elegy," the second beginning and ending with "The Glanmore Sonnets," which fall directly in the center of the collection, and the third beginning with "September Song" and continuing through to the end of the collection."

- "Oysters" recalls a dinner between the poet and his friends. Like Heaney's earlier poem, "Digging," it examines "the function of the poet in society, and both end with a declaration of confidence in the socially redemptive power of poetry."
- "Triptych"
1. "After a Killing" begins with the mention of "Two young men with rifles on the hill, / Profane and bracing as their instruments." The speaker asks: "Who's sorry for our trouble?"
2. "Sibyl"
3. "At the Water's Edge"
- "The Toome Road" includes imagery of "armored cars," "powerful tyres," and "headphoned soldiers standing up in turrets." The speaker asks with regard to the soldiers: "How long were they approaching down my roads / As if they owned them? The whole country was sleeping."
- "A Drink of Water"
- "The Strand at Lough Beg" is an elegy to Heaney's cousin, Colum McCartney, who "was the victim of a random sectarian killing in the late summer of 1975." The epigraph quotes Dante's Purgatorio Canto I, verses 100-102: "All round this little island / Far down below there, where the breakers strive, / Grow the tall rushes from the oozy sand."
- "A Postcard from North Antrim" was written about Heaney’s friend, Sean Armstrong, who was shot in the early days of The Troubles.
- "Casualty" is about Louis O’Neill, a regular in Heaney's father-in-law’s pub who was killed in The Troubles "Casualty" also refers to the thirteen people were shot dead and seventeen injured by British soldiers of the Parachute Regiment on 30 January 1972. This happened within a span of thirty minutes in the Bogside area of Derry.” Daniel Tobin argues, this poem "recognizes that the individual's freedom and compassion originate in an inner demand more powerful than the tribal call" and Blake Morrison writes that by the end of the poem, "the poet is seen as someone whose pursuit of art places him above and beyond the demands of the tribe."
- "The Badgers" refers to "some violent shattered boy / nosing out what got mislaid / between the cradle and the explosion" and asks "How perilous is it to choose / not to love the life we're shown?" The last two lines of the poem read: "The unquestionable houseboy's shoulders / that could have been my own".
- "The Singer’s House" is about "the poet's and the poem's right to a tune in spite of the tunelessness of the world around them."
- "The Guttural Muse"
- "In Memoriam Seán Ó Riada" One of three "poetic obsequies" in the collection about the Irish composer.
- "Elegy"
- "Glanmore Sonnets" There are ten individual, untitled sonnets that make up the "Glanmore Sonnets". The first of which has an epigraph that reads: "for Ann Saddlemyer, 'our heartiest welcomer' " and it is from this first sonnet that the Heaney collection Opened Ground: Selected Poems 1966-1996 takes its title. Weiner calls these sonnets the "heart" of Field Work.
- "September Song"
- "An Afterwards"
- "High Summer"
- "The Otter"
- "The Skunk" One of Heaney's best known poems, "The Skunk" is about his wife to whom he refers, by using an extended metaphor. Heaney has been recorded reading this collection on the Seamus Heaney Collected Poems album.
- "Homecomings"
- "A Dream of Jealousy" stems from a conversation between the speaker, the "you" he addresses, and "another lady / In wooded parkland."
- "Polder"
- "Field Work"
- "Song"
- "Leavings"
- "The Harvest Bow"
- "In Memoriam Francis Ledwidge" One of three "poetic obsequies" in the collection about the Irish War Poet. The epigraph reads: "killed in France 31 July 1917"
- "Ugolino" refers to Cantos 32 and 33 of Dante's Inferno.
