= Grauballe Man =

Iron Age bog body from Denmark

- Facial reconstruction of Grauballe Man
- Born: c. Late 3rd century BC
- Died: 321–261 BC; Near Grauballe, Jutland, Denmark
- Cause of death: Throat cut (severed trachea and esophagus)
- Body discovered: 26 April 1952; Near Grauballe, Jutland, Denmark; 56°12′35″N 9°37′49″E
- Known for: Exceptionally well-preserved Iron Age bog body
- Height: Unknown (body shrunk due to bog preservation)

Grauballe Man (Danish: Grauballemanden) is an Iron Age bog body discovered on 26 April 1952 in a peat bog near the village of Grauballe in Jutland, Denmark. The body, which dates to between 321 and 261 BCE during the early Germanic Iron Age, is one of the best-preserved bog bodies ever discovered. His naturally preserved skin, hair, and internal soft tissues have made him one of the most intensively studied human remains from prehistoric Europe.

Grauballe Man died after his throat was cut in a single deep wound that severed his trachea and oesophagus. His naked body was deposited in the bog, where the cool, acidic, oxygen-poor conditions preserved it for more than two millennia. Although the circumstances of his death remain uncertain, archaeologists have variously interpreted it as an execution, judicial punishment, or human sacrifice, reflecting wider debates about violence and ritual in Iron Age northwestern Europe.

Following his discovery, Grauballe Man became one of Denmark's best-known archaeological finds. After pioneering conservation treatment, he went on permanent display at Moesgaard Museum near Aarhus, where he remains one of the museum's most important exhibits.

== Discovery ==
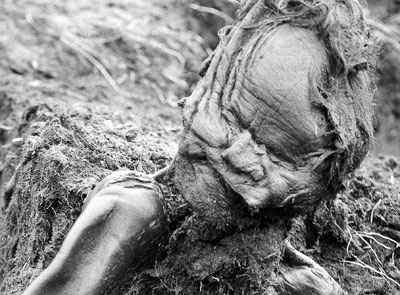
The body of the Grauballe Man upon his discovery.

The Grauballe Man's body was discovered buried in the bog on 26 April 1952 by a team of peat diggers. One of the workers, Tage Busk Sørensen, stuck his spade into something that he knew was not peat; upon revealing more, they discovered the head protruding from the ground, and the local postman, who was passing, alerted the local doctor as well as an amateur archaeologist named Ulrik Balslev.

With the body still in the peat, various locals came to visit it the next day, one of whom accidentally stepped on its head. The following morning Professor Peter Glob from the Prehistory Museum at Aarhus came to visit the body and arranged for it to be moved to the museum, still encased in a block of peat.

The corpse was not found with any artefacts or any evidence of clothing, indicating that when he died he was entirely naked or his clothing had deteriorated, something that had also happened with the Tollund Man.

== Condition ==
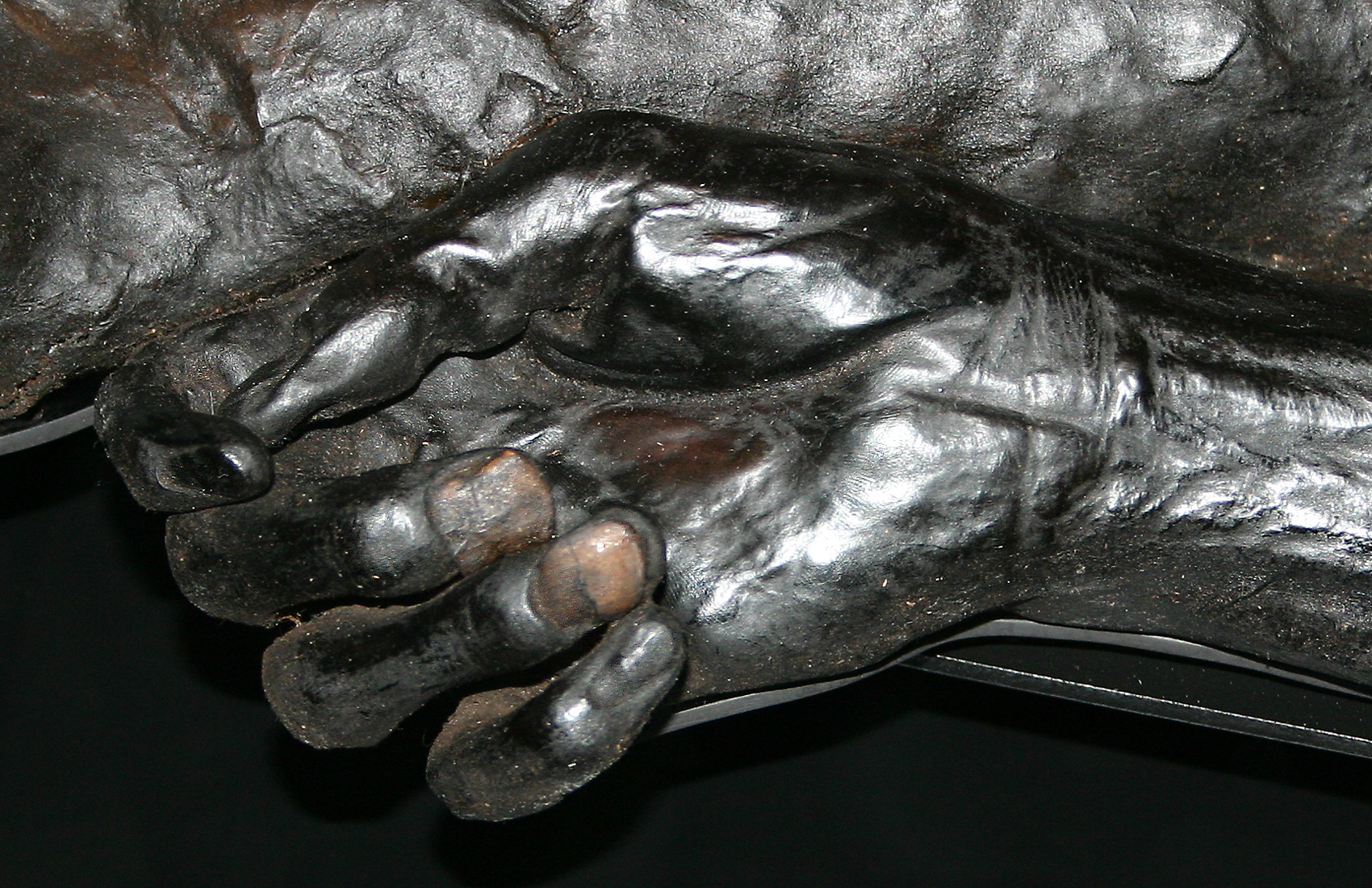
Grauballe Man's preserved hand.

The cool, acidic and oxygen-poor conditions of the peat bog naturally preserved Grauballe Man's skin, hair and other soft tissues for more than 2,000 years. As a result, when his body was excavated in 1952, it remained remarkably lifelike.

More than two millennia after his death, many details of his appearance had survived. His face remained clearly recognisable, with short hair, beard stubble and well-preserved skin. The soft tissues of his face are preserved in sufficient detail to reflect the tension present at the time of his death. The skin on his hands and feet was preserved well enough for investigators to record his fingerprints after excavation.

The bog also changed his appearance over time. During more than two millennia of burial, the body became waterlogged, helping to preserve its overall anatomical form. After excavation, evaporation caused the body to shrink, making his original height impossible to determine accurately. His hair also changed colour during its long burial in the bog, turning reddish-brown.

== Exhibition ==
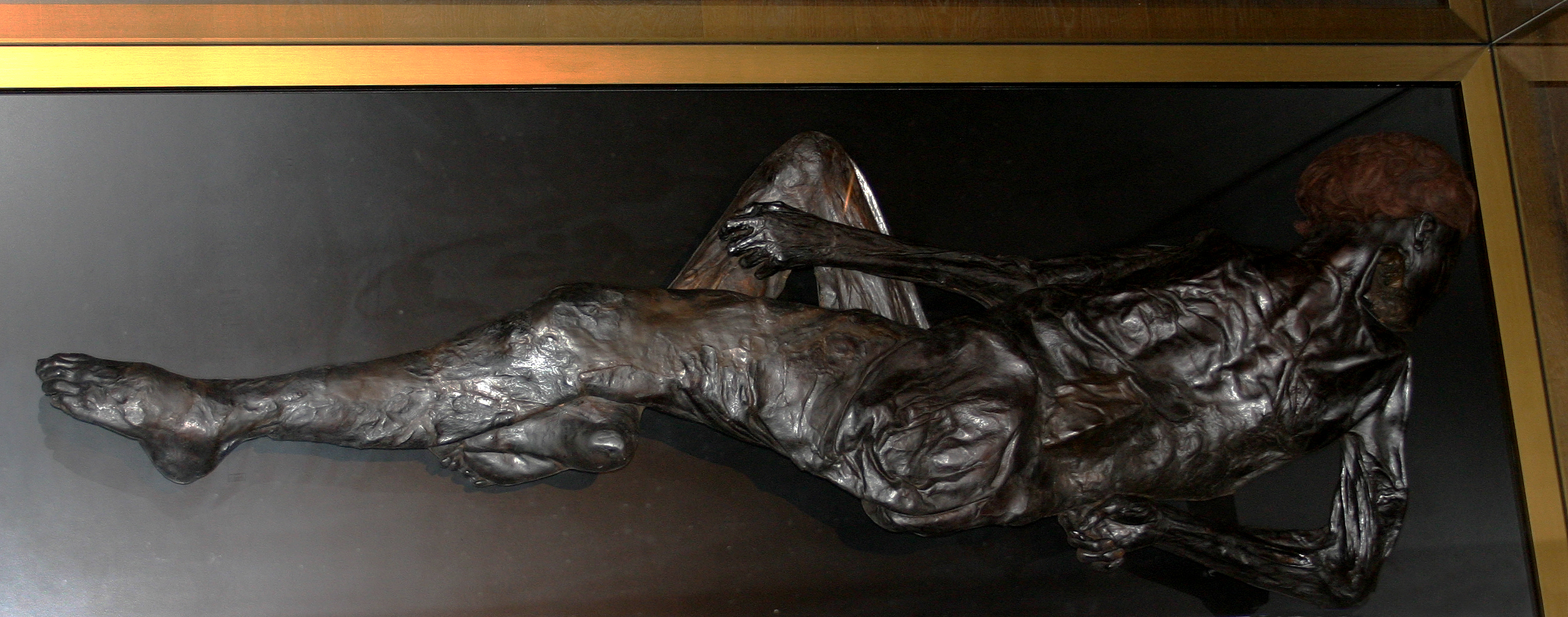
Grauballe Man on display at Moesgaard Museum in 2004.

Despite warnings from some scientists that the body should first undergo conservation, Grauballe Man was placed on public display within days of his discovery due to intense public interest. Visitors viewed the body while it still rested in its original block of peat, and an estimated 18,000 people attended the ten-day exhibition. Before long, mould began to appear on parts of the body because it had to be kept permanently moist.

Following the exhibition, Grauballe Man underwent an 18-month conservation treatment. Once the treatment was complete, he went on permanent display at the Moesgaard Museum near Aarhus in 1955. Nearly 50 years later, he was removed from exhibition again between 2001 and 2002 while researchers carried out a new programme of scientific examination. He was then returned to public display.

== Conservation ==
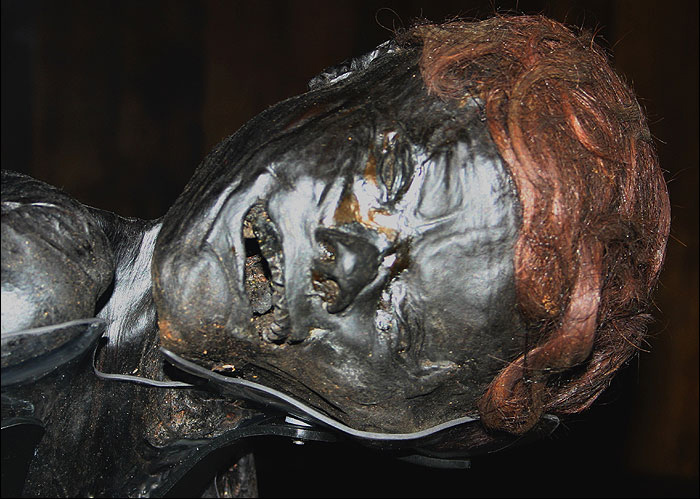
The face of the Grauballe Man

Following Grauballe Man's discovery in 1952, conservators faced the challenge of preserving the entire body for future study and public exhibition. At the time, no complete bog body had ever been successfully conserved. Earlier discoveries had often been allowed to dry, causing severe shrinkage and hardening, or had been reburied because no suitable preservation method existed.

Conservator C. Lange-Kornbak examined several possible methods before selecting a preservation process intended to continue the natural tanning that had taken place during more than two millennia in the peat bog. Over the following year and a half, Grauballe Man remained immersed in a solution of water and oak bark before being treated with leather oils. When the treatment was complete, Lange-Kornbak remarked that the process had left the body "as well-preserved as an old boot". Grauballe Man's was ongoing, requiring only periodic applications of Turkish Red Oil to maintain the preserved tissues.

== Scientific study ==
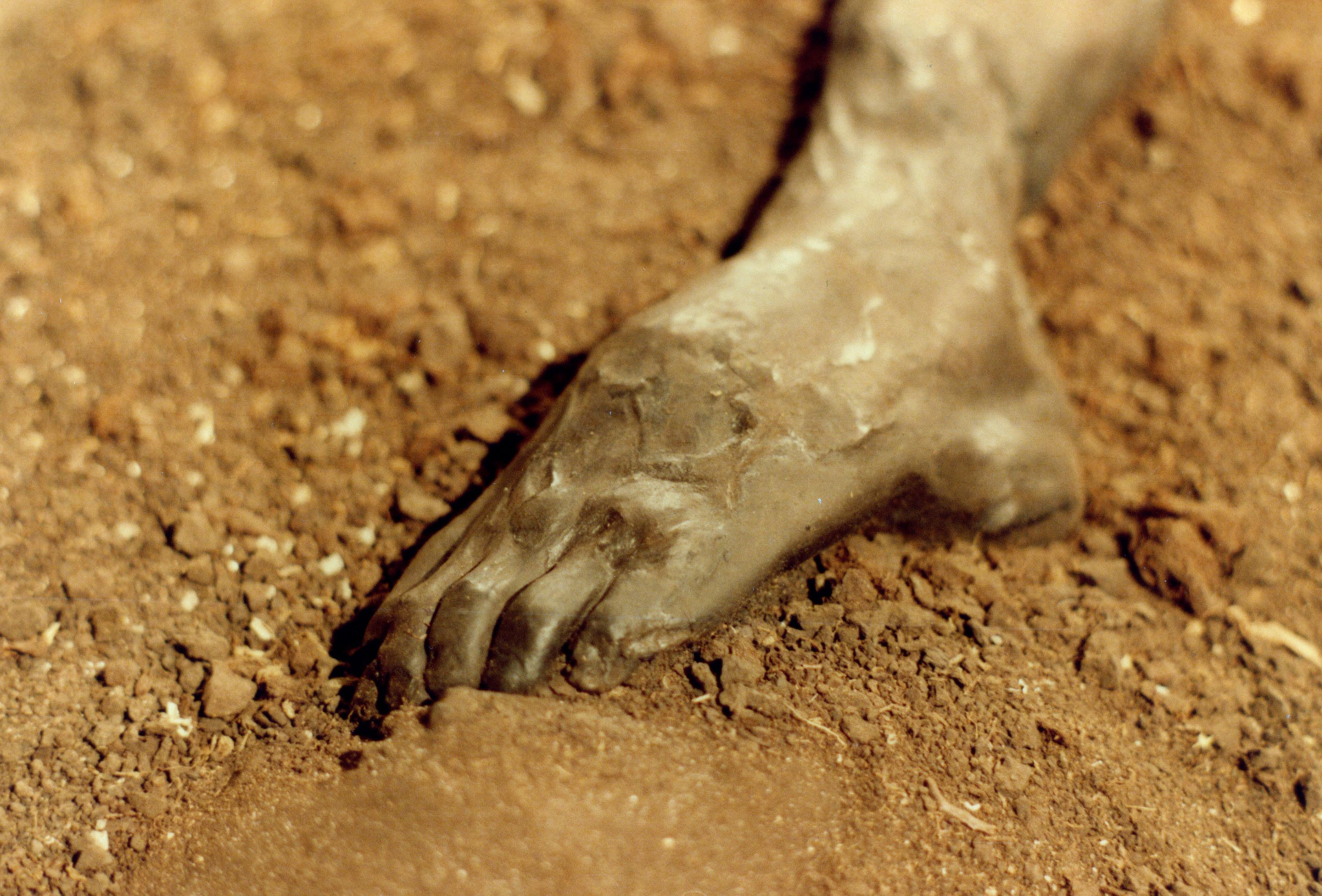
Grauballe Man's preserved foot.

Grauballe Man has been the subject of repeated scientific investigation since his discovery in 1952. Within days of his excavation, the Prehistoric Museum in Aarhus organised a programme of research that included X-rays, an autopsy, and examinations of the man's teeth and stomach contents. Conducted before conservation began, these investigations reflected Glob's view of Grauballe Man as both an important archaeological discovery and a museum object whose preservation would allow future generations to continue studying him.

More than fifty years later, advances in medical imaging prompted a second major programme of investigation. Computed tomography (CT) scans allowed researchers to examine the body's internal structures without damaging the remains while creating a permanent digital record for future study and conservation. The scans also enabled the production of life-sized three-dimensional models and supported facial reconstruction.

The renewed investigations also changed earlier interpretations. CT scans showed that the skull had been compressed after burial by the weight of the surrounding peat rather than fractured by a violent blow before death. The researchers also argued that injuries previously attributed to violence on bog bodies may instead have resulted from physical and chemical changes during burial, recommending that evidence of trauma be critically re-evaluated using modern imaging techniques.

Researchers have also attempted to recover DNA from dentine, the hard tissue beneath tooth enamel. The analysis failed, probably because the acidic, waterlogged conditions of the bog had degraded the genetic material over more than two millennia of burial. The researchers noted, however, that advances in techniques capable of analysing much shorter DNA fragments may eventually make successful genetic analysis possible.

=== Diet ===
Before his death, Grauballe Man ate a gruel, a thin porridge made mainly from weed seeds, with smaller quantities of cereal grain and meat. Remains of this meal survived in his digestive tract for more than 2,000 years. A new analysis, published in 2007, confirmed its broad composition.

Danish archaeobotanist Hans Helbæk, a specialist in ancient plant remains, examined the food after the body's discovery in 1952. In his findings, published in 1958, he identified barley, emmer and spelt, two types of wheat, evidence of rye, and wild oats. The meal also contained seeds from wild grasses and other plants, including pale persicaria, a member of the knotweed family. Some seeds remained whole, while others survived as fragments of their outer coverings. Helbæk observed scorching on some cereal remains, which he attributed to cooking.

About a dozen small bone fragments indicated that Grauballe Man had also eaten meat. Danish animal-bone specialist Ulrik Möhl examined the largest piece but could not identify the animal securely. He suggested that it might have come from a rib or vertebra of a domestic animal approximately the size of a piglet. The food remains also included sand, two small pebbles and a piece of charcoal.

Ergot, a fungus that infects cereals and grasses, was also present. Its discovery led to suggestions that Grauballe Man had eaten food capable of causing hallucinations before his death. However, Helbæk's original study did not establish how much ergot the meal contained. Later research questioned whether the quantity was sufficient to cause significant pain-numbing effects or hallucinations.

== Cause of death ==
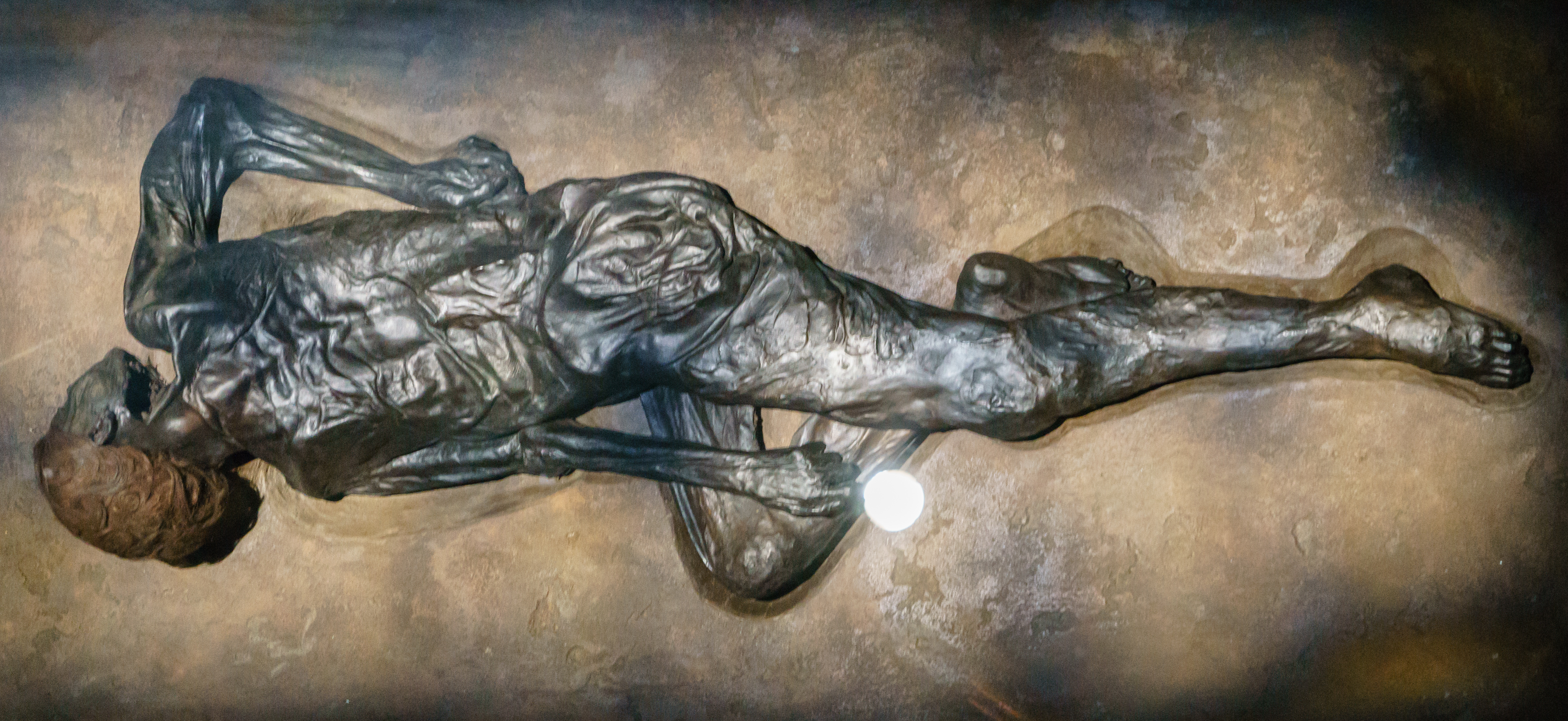
On display at Moesgaard Museum

The man's death was caused by a single wide cut from ear to ear, severing his trachea and esophagus. Such a wound could not have been self-inflicted, indicating that this was not suicide.

Specialists at the Moesgaard Museum note that the cut appears to have been delivered in a single, forceful action. The blow was strong enough to sever the major vessels of the neck and leave a mark on the upper vertebrae. The direction and depth of the cut suggest it was made from behind, possibly while he was lowered or held in place.

== Modern culture ==
The Grauballe Man is the subject of the eponymous poem in Seamus Heaney's 1975 poetry collection North, while the Tollund Man figures in his 1972 volume Wintering Out.

== See also ==
- List of Danish bog bodies
