= Station Island (poetry collection) =

Poetry collection by Seamus Heaney

- First Edition
- Author: Seamus Heaney
- Language: English
- Publisher: Faber and Faber
- Publication date: 1984
- Media type: Print
- Pages: 128 pp
- ISBN: 9780571133024
- Preceded by: Field Work
- Followed by: The Haw Lantern

Station Island is the sixth collection of original poetry written by Irish poet Seamus Heaney, who was awarded the Nobel Prize in Literature in 1995. It is dedicated to the Northern Irish playwright Brian Friel. The collection was first published in the United Kingdom and Ireland in 1984 by Faber & Faber and was then published in America by Farrar, Straus and Giroux in 1985. Seamus Heaney was recorded reading this collection on the Seamus Heaney Collected Poems album.

The title of the collection, Station Island, is taken from the long poem of the same name that comprises the second part of the collection. It refers to Station Island (also known as Saint Patrick's Purgatory) on Lough Derg in County Donegal, Ireland, site of Christian pilgrimage for many centuries. During his undergraduate years at Queen's University Belfast, Heaney went on the pilgrimage several times.

The poems in the collection are generally focused on the role of the poet and their relationship to history and politics but, more specifically, are also a platform through which Heaney can examine his own complex relationship with the sectarian violence of The Troubles in Northern Ireland (including his decision to move his family out of the north to the Republic of Ireland in 1972). In an interview collected in Stepping Stones Heaney describes the driving force behind his writing of the long poem "Station Island": "I needed to butt my way through a blockage, a pile-up of hampering stuff, everything that had gathered up inside me because of the way I was both in an out of the Northern Ireland situation. I wasn't actively involved, yet I felt dragged upon and put upon by it." Earlier, in the same interview, he says that for him "Station Island" "was more like an examination of conscience than a confession. A kind of inner courtroom, as dramatic as it was confessional. It was written, sure enough, to release an inner pressure. But it was also set up so that different voices could speak and different weights get lifted."

Heaney had thought of writing a poem based on Lough Derg since the mid-1960s but it wasn't until he read Dante in the 1970s that what would become "Station Island" started to take shape. He states that, "Dante was the first mover of the sequence, no doubt about that. The experience of reading him in the 1970s was mighty, and translating the Ugolino episode [which appeared as the final poem in Field Work, the volume published prior to Station Island] was like doing press-ups, getting ready for something bigger." Before the long poem "Station Island" was published in 1984, as part of the collection by the same name, the first three sections of the poem appeared in altered form in The Hudson Review in 1983.

== Contents ==
PART ONE

- The Underground
- La Toilette
- Sloe Gin
- Away from it All
- Chekhov on Sakhalin
- Sandstone Keepsake
- Shelf Life 1. Granite Chip
- Shelf Life 2. Old Smoothing Iron
- Shelf Life 3. Old Pewter
- Shelf Life 4. Iron Spike
- Shelf Life 5. Stone from Delphi
- Shelf Life 6. A Snowshoe
- A Migration
- Last Look
- Remembering Malibu
- Making Strange
- The Birthplace
- Changes
- An Ulster Twilight
- A Bat on the Road
- A Hazel Stick for Catherine Ann
- A Kite for Michael and Christopher
- The Railway Children
- Sweetpea
- An Aisling in the Burren
- Widgeon
- Sheelagh na Gig
- The Loaning
- The Sandpit 1. 1946
- The Sandpit 2. The Demobbed Bricklayer
- The Sandpit 3. The Sand Boom
- The Sandpit 4. What the Brick Keeps
- The King of the Ditchbacks I
- The King of the Ditchbacks II
- The King of the Ditchbacks III

PART TWO - STATION ISLAND

- Station Island I
- Station Island II
- Station Island III
- Station Island IV
- Station Island V
- Station Island VI
- Station Island VII
- Station Island VIII
- Station Island IX
- Station Island X
- Station Island XI
- Station Island XII

PART THREE - SWEENEY REDIVIVUS

- The First Gloss
- Sweeney Redivivus
- Unwinding
- In the Beech
- The First Kingdom
- The First Flight
- Drifting Off
- Alerted
- The Cleric
- The Hermit
- The Master
- The Scribes
- A Waking Dream
- In the Chestnut Tree
- Sweeney's Returns
- Holly
- An Artist
- The Old Icons
- In Illo Tempore
- On the Road

The collection has three parts. The first part consists of 25 lyric poems. While the lyrics cover a range of topics several allude to the larger theme of the collection as a whole: the question of what responsibility the poet has to bear witness to and address historical and political issues. In "Away from it All" Heaney quotes from Czeslaw Milosz's "Native Realm" in which he writes, "I was stretched between contemplation / of a motionless point / and the command to participate / actively in history." The tug between these two poles, aesthetics and history, is further taken up in "Chekhov on Sakhalin," Heaney's poetic rendering of Anton Chekhov's visit to the penal colony on Sakhalin Island in 1890 to observe and write about the condition of the prisoners.

The second part is the eponymous long poem "Station Island" which is broken into twelve sections. Describing the way in which he modeled the structure of the poem on Dante, Heaney calls it "the three-part Dantean journey scaled down into the three-day station, no hell, no paradise, just 'Patrick's Purgatory.'" This is evident from the start of the first chapter. During his pilgrimage Heaney, the protagonist of the poem, encounters ghosts from his past who engage him in dialogue. The ghosts range from victims of sectarian violence in Northern Ireland, to figures from Heaney's childhood in Castledawson, to writers and poets who have greatly influenced Heaney's own poetics. The victims of sectarian violence include such figures as the shopkeeper William Strathearn (Section VII), Heaney's cousin Colum McCartney, whose murder was previously the subject of the poem "The Strand at Lough Beg" (Section VIII), and the hunger-striker and Heaney family acquaintance Francis Hughes (Section IX). Among those ghosts from his past are the traveller Simon Sweeney (Section I), his teacher at the Anahorish School, Master Murphy (Section V), and two separate unnamed priests (Section IV and XI). The 19th-century Irish author of Lough Derg Pilgrim William Carleton (Section II) and the poets Patrick Kavanagh and Gerard Manley Hopkins are among the literary figures in whom Heaney finds inspiration and meets on his pilgrimage (Section V). The final section of the poem, Section XII, ends with a fictional encounter between Heaney and James Joyce who, following the Dantean motif, assumes the role of Virgil. Joyce allows Heaney a freedom from the self-questioning stance he has assumed throughout the poem when he tells him that "the main thing is to write / for the joy of it...And don't be so earnest, // let others wear the sackcloth and the ashes. / Let go, let fly, forget. You've listened long enough. Now strike your note."

The third part is titled "Sweeney Redivivus." It consists of poems (or "glosses" as Heaney terms them) based on the figure of Sweeney from Sweeney Astray (1983), Heaney's translation of the medieval Irish text Buile Suibhne. In his introduction to Sweeney Astray Heaney indicates the significance that the story of Sweeney has for him by writing that it can be seen as "an aspect of the quarrel between free creative imagination and the constraints of religious, political, and domestic obligation."

== Reception ==
Richard Ellmann, in his review of Station Island for The New York Review of Books, praised the collection writing, "Many of these poems have a tough rind as though the author knew that for his purposes deferred comprehension was better than instant. Obliquity suits him. Heaney's talent, a prodigious one, is exfoliating and augmenting here."

Helen Vendler similarly applauded the collection when she reviewed it for The New Yorker. She writes: "Heaney's voice, by turns mythological and journalistic, rural and sophisticated, reminiscent and impatient, stern and yielding, curt and expansive, is one of a suppleness almost equal to consciousness itself. The two tones he generally avoids—on principle, I imagine, and by temperament—are the prophetic and the denunciatory, those standbys of political poetry. It is arresting to find a poetry so conscious of cultural and social facts which nonetheless remains chiefly a poetry of awareness, observation, and sorrow."

Paul Muldoon, who reviewed the collection for the London Review of Books, had a slightly more temperate reaction. He considered the 25 lyrics comprising the first part of the collection to be the strongest of the three parts and the third part, "Sweeney Redivivus" to be the weakest. He concluded, however, on a positive note writing that, "not even the weak third section of Station Island can take away from the fact that this is a resourceful and reliable collection, his best since Wintering Out."
