= Elegy for a Stillborn Child =

Elegy For a Stillborn Child written by Seamus Heaney is a poem about the death of his friend's stillborn child.

It deals with the sad eventful death of the baby and how the mother and father react to the traumatic event as well as Seamus Heaney himself. The poem was published c. 1966 along with others such as Triptych for the Easter Battlers, Homage to Pieter Breughel, Persephone, Rookery, Requiem for the Irish Rebels, The Peninsula, and Orange Drums, Tyrone 1966.
