= North (poetry collection) =

1975 poetry collection by Seamus Heaney

- First edition
- Author: Seamus Heaney
- Language: English
- Genre: Poetry
- Publisher: Faber and Faber
- Publication date: 1975
- Media type: Print
- Pages: 73
- Awards: 1975 Duff Cooper Prize
- ISBN: 0-571-17780-8
- Preceded by: Wintering Out
- Followed by: Field Work

North (1975) is a collection of poems written by Seamus Heaney, who received the 1995 Nobel Prize in Literature. It was the first of his works that directly dealt with the Troubles in Northern Ireland, and it looks frequently to the past for images and symbols relevant to the violence and political unrest of that time. Heaney has been recorded reading this collection on the Seamus Heaney Collected Poems album.

The collection is divided into two parts of which the first is more symbolic, dealing with themes such as the Greek myth of Antaeus, the bog bodies of Northern Europe, Vikings, and other historical figures. The second, shorter part contains poems that deal more specifically with life in Northern Ireland during The Troubles and contains dedicatory poems to Michael McLaverty and Seamus Deane.

The title of the volume may come from a poem in the volume; however, while the manuscript drafts reveal other titles Heaney considered for the poem, no evidence exists that he ever considered a different title for the volume. Rand Brandes writes, "North was always North". The poem "North" invokes one of the volume's primary symbols—the Viking raiders who invaded Ireland between 795 and 980. The volume title also suggests these northern raiders, the bog bodies found in Northern Europe, and most significantly, the North of Ireland.

== Contents ==
Mossbawn: Two Poems in Dedication to Mary Heaney

- 1. Sunlight
- 2. The Seed Cutters

Part 1

- Antaeus
- Belderg
- Funeral Rites
- North
- Viking Dublin: Trial Pieces
- The Digging Skeleton
- Bone Dreams
- Come to the Bower
- Bog Queen
- The Grauballe Man
- Punishment
- Strange Fruit
- Kinship
- Ocean's Love to Ireland
- Aisling
- Act of Union
- The Betrothal of Cavehill
- Hercules and Antaeus

Part 2

- The Unacknowledged Legislator's Dream
- Whatever You Say Say Nothing
- Freedman
- Singing School
- 1. The Ministry of Fear
- 2. A Constable Calls
- 3. Orange Drums, Tyrone, 1966
- 4. Summer 1969
- 5. Fosterage
- 6. Exposure

== Bog body poems ==
Bog bodies inspire four poems in this volume: "Bog Queen", "The Grauballe Man", "Punishment", and "Strange Fruit". In his previous volume, Wintering Out, Heaney published the first of his bog-body poems, "Tollund Man". Heaney was inspired to write these poems after reading PV Glob's book, The Bog People, an archeological study of Iron-Age bodies discovered in the bogs of Northern Europe. In his essay "Feeling Into Words", Heaney explains that he found this book during a time when writing poetry had shifted for him "from being simply a matter of achieving the satisfactory verbal icon to being a search for images and symbols adequate to our predicament". The bog bodies of Glob's book became such symbols for Heaney, who writes, "And the unforgettable photographs of these victims blended in my mind with photographs of atrocities, past and present, in the long rites of Irish political and religious struggles". In these poems, Heaney draws connections between the past and present.

=== Bog Queen ===
"Bog Queen" is about the decomposition of an unidentified queen of the bog. In the poem, the decomposing queen comes to represent life cycles, as the queen both generates and takes away life. Heaney uses the feminine character to create sensuality, intuition and physicality that is typical of Heaney's female characters. This is significant because Heaney does not distance himself from the bog queen as he does with the other Bog Poems. He speaks as the bog queen herself rather than as an outside observer.

=== Grauballe Man ===
"The Grauballe Man" is a response to a photograph seen of the real Grauballe Man. The first half of the poem is a description of each part of the bog body. Heaney uses dark imagery in conjunction with distinctly human qualities to give the man a spiritual persistence. The poem then speculates on his past life and ends with him shedding the memories of his past.

=== Punishment ===
"Punishment" is a bog poem written to Windeby I. Heaney's voice is one of a voyeur, imagining the past life of a girl who was hung for adultery. After a description that enlivens the bog body, the poem culminates with Heaney addressing the paralyzing emotional experience of being a voyeur to such "tribal, intimate revenge".

=== Strange Fruit ===
Unlike the other poems, the descriptions in "Strange Fruit" do not evoke the body's past life and describe it as a bog body. Heaney describes the body as it has been preserved and how this body gradually moves into the "Murdered, forgotten, nameless, terrible." The body takes on a new ethos as something that forgets whatever past life of the body. It is a testament to the terrible legacy created because of war.

== Reception ==
The reception of North has varied since its publication. It is Heaney's most controversial volume. A number of critics have received the volume positively. Helen Vendler, for example, labeled it "One of the few unforgettable single volumes published in English since the modernist era" and later as "one of the crucial poetic intervention of the twentieth century". Conor Cruise O'Brien wrote, "I had the uncanny feeling, reading these poems, of listening to the thing itself, the actual substance of historical agony and dissolution, the tragedy of a people in a place: the Catholics of Northern Ireland". Seamus Deane also responded positively to the volume, finding that the poems "interrogate the quality of the relationship between the poet and his mixed political and literary tradition". For Deane, this volume is less about politics than it is about the relationship of the poet to politics and the demand placed on Heaney for a political commitment.

Other critics, however, have been less comfortable with Heaney's approach to violence and politics. Eiléan Ní Chuilleanáin noted, relatively benignly, a "lack of ironic awareness" in North, identifying that lack as a limitation of the volume. Others leveled harsher criticism at Heaney's use of violent images from the past as metaphors for contemporary political violence. Notably, Ciaran Carson dismissed the volume and its positive reviews. In his review, he writes, "Everyone was anxious that North should be a great book; when it turned out it wasn't, it was treated as one anyway, and made into an Ulster '75 Exhibition of the Good that can come out of Troubled Times." Carson's primary critique is Heaney's blending of past and present, noting that "the real difference between our society and that of Jutland in some vague past are glossed over". Because of this, Carson saw Heaney in this volume as "the laureate of violence--a mythmaker, an anthropologist of ritual killing, an apologist for 'the situation,' in the last resort, a mystifier". In agreement with Carson, Edna Longley saw the volume as a misguided foray into political poetry. She writes, "North does not give the impression of the urgent 'mater of Ireland' bursting through the confines of 'the well-made poem'. Heaney's most 'artful' book, it stylises and distances what was immediate and painful in Wintering Out". She goes on to suggest that in the volume, Heaney "pluck[s] the heart out of his mystery and serve[s] it up as a quasi-political mystique".

North has continued to receive positive and negative criticism, and it remains among Heaney's most important volumes. After Heaney's death in 2013, The Telegraph published an article listing Heaney's ten best poems, selecting three poems from North for the list, and scholarship continues to be published with a focus on this volume.

== See also ==
- Tollund Man
