= Seeing Things (poetry collection) =

1991 poetry collection by Seamus Heaney

- First edition (publ. Faber)
- Author: Seamus Heaney
- Language: English
- Publisher: Faber and Faber
- Publication date: 1991
- Media type: Print
- Pages: 128 pp
- ISBN: 9780571144693
- Preceded by: The Haw Lantern
- Followed by: The Spirit Level

Seeing Things is the eighth poetry collection by Seamus Heaney, who received the 1995 Nobel Prize in Literature. It was published in 1991. Heaney draws inspiration from the visions of afterlife in Virgil and Dante Alighieri in order to come to terms with the death of his father, Patrick, in 1986. The title, Seeing Things, refers both to the solid, fluctuating world of objects and to a haunted, hallucinatory realm of the imagination. Heaney has been recorded reading this collection on the Seamus Heaney Collected Poems album.

- The Golden Bough

PART I

- The Journey Back
- Markings
- Three Drawings 1. The Point
- Three Drawings 2. The Pulse
- Three Drawings 3. A Haul
- Casting and Gathering
- Man and Boy
- Seeing Things I
- Seeing Things II
- Seeing Things III
- The Ash Plant
- 1.1.87
- An August Night
- Field of Vision
- The Pitchfork
- A Basket of Chestnuts
- The Biretta
- The Settle Bed
- The Schoolbag
- Glanmore Revisited 1. Scrabble
- Glanmore Revisited 2. The Cot
- Glanmore Revisited 3. Scene Shifts
- Glanmore Revisited 4. 1973
- Glanmore Revisited 5. Lustral Sonnet
- Glanmore Revisited 6. Bedside Reading
- Glanmore Revisited 7. The Skylight
- A Pillowed Head
- A Royal Prospect
- A Retrospect
- The Rescue
- Wheels within Wheels
- The Sounds of Rain
- Fosterling

PART II - SQUARINGS

1: Lightenings

- Lightenings i
- Lightenings ii
- Lightenings iii
- Lightenings iv
- Lightenings v
- Lightenings vi
- Lightenings vii
- Lightenings viii
- Lightenings ix
- Lightenings x
- Lightenings xi
- Lightenings xii

2: Settings

- Settings xiii
- Settings xiv
- Settings xv
- Settings xvi
- Settings xvii
- Settings xviii
- Settings xix
- Settings xx
- Settings xxi
- Settings xxii
- Settings xxiii
- Settings xxiv

3: Crossings

- Crossings xxv
- Crossings xxvi
- Crossings xxvii
- Crossings xxviii
- Crossings xxix
- Crossings xxx
- Crossings xxxi
- Crossings xxxii
- Crossings xxxiii
- Crossings xxxiv
- Crossings xxxv
- Crossings xxxvi

4. Squarings

- Squarings xxxvii
- Squarings xxxviii
- Squarings xxxix
- Squarings xl
- Squarings xli
- Squarings xlii
- Squarings xliii
- Squarings xliv
- Squarings xlv
- Squarings xlvi
- Squarings xlvii
- Squarings xlviii
- The Crossing
