= Electric Light (poetry collection) =

- Hardback first American edition
- Author: Seamus Heaney
- Language: English
- Genre: Poetry collection
- Publisher: Faber and Faber, London
- Publication date: 2001
- Publication place: United Kingdom
- Media type: Print
- Pages: 81
- ISBN: 978-0-571-20798-5
- OCLC: 45592796
- Preceded by: The Spirit Level
- Followed by: District and Circle

Electric Light (Faber and Faber, 2001, ISBN 978-0-571-20798-5) is a poetry collection by Seamus Heaney, who received the 1995 Nobel Prize in Literature. The collection explores childhood, nature, and poetry itself.

Part one presents translations and adaptations, occasional and celebratory poems, and verse about travel in the Gaeltacht, the Balkans and Greece. Part two of the collection consists of elegies for poets (Ted Hughes, Joseph Brodsky, and Zbigniew Herbert), and Heaney's relatives and friends.

Heaney has been recorded reading this collection on the Seamus Heaney Collected Poems album.

== Contents ==
- At Toomebridge
- Perch
- Lupins
- Out of the Bag 1
- Out of the Bag 2
- Out of the Bag 3
- Out of the Bag 4
- Bann Valley Eclogue
- Montana
- The Loose Box
- Turpin Song
- The Border Campaign
- Known World
- The Little Canticles of Asturias 1
- The Little Canticles of Asturias 2
- The Little Canticles of Asturias 3
- Ballynahinch Lake
- The Clothes Shrine
- Red, White and Blue 1. Red
- Red, White and Blue 2. White
- Red, White and Blue 3. Blue
- Virgil: Eclogue IX
- Glanmore Eclogue
- Sonnets from Hellas 1. Into Arcadia
- Sonnets from Hellas 2. Conkers
- Sonnets from Hellas 3. Pylos
- Sonnets from Hellas 4. The Augean Stables
- Sonnets from Hellas 5. Castalian Spring
- Sonnets from Hellas 6. Desfina
- The Gaeltacht
- The Real Name
- The Bookcase
- Vitruviana
- Ten Glosses 1. The Marching Season
- Ten Glosses 2. The Catechism
- Ten Glosses 3. The Bridge
- Ten Glosses 4. A Suit
- Ten Glosses 5. The Party
- Ten Glosses 6. W. H. Auden 1907-73
- Ten Glosses 7. The Lesson
- Ten Glosses 8. Moling's Gloss
- Ten Glosses 9. Colly
- Ten Glosses 10. A Norman Simile
- The Fragment
- On His Work in the English Tongue (1)
- On His Work in the English Tongue (2)
- On His Work in the English Tongue (3)
- On His Work in the English Tongue (4)
- On His Work in the English Tongue (5)
- Audenesque
- To the Shade of Zbigniew Herbert
- 'Would They Had Stay'd'
- Late in the Day
- Arion
- Bodies and Souls
- Clonmany to Ahascragh
- Sruth
- Seeing the Sick
- Electric Light
