= The Spirit Level (poetry collection) =

1996 poetry collection by Seamus Heaney

- First edition (publ. Faber)
- Author: Seamus Heaney
- Language: English
- Publisher: Faber and Faber
- Publication date: 1996
- Media type: Print
- Pages: 80 pp
- ISBN: 9780571178223
- Preceded by: Seeing Things
- Followed by: Electric Light

The Spirit Level is a 1996 poetry collection written by Seamus Heaney, who received the 1995 Nobel Prize in Literature. It won the poetry prize for the 1996 Whitbread Awards.

Heaney has been recorded reading this collection on the Seamus Heaney Collected Poems album.

== Contents ==
- The Rain Stick
- To a Dutch Potter in Ireland 1.
- To a Dutch Potter in Ireland 2. After Liberation
- A Brigid's Girdle
- Mint
- A Sofa in the Forties
- Keeping Going
- Two Lorries
- Damson
- Weighing In
- St Kevin and the Blackbird
- The Flight Path 1
- The Flight Path 2
- The Flight Path 3
- The Flight Path 4
- The Flight Path 5
- The Flight Path 6
- An Invocation
- Mycenae Lookout 1. The Watchman's War
- Mycenae Lookout 2. Cassandra
- Mycenae Lookout 3. His Dawn Vision
- Mycenae Lookout 4. The Nights
- Mycenae Lookout 5. The Reverie of Water
- The First Words
- The Gravel Walks
- Whitby-sur-Moyola
- The Thimble
- The Butter-Print
- Remembered Columns
- 'Poet's Chair'
- The Swing
- The Poplar
- Two Stick Drawings (1)
- Two Stick Drawings (2)
- A Call
- The Errand
- A Dog Was Crying Tonight in Wicklow Also
- M.
- An Architect
- The Sharping Stone
- The Strand
- The Walk
- At the Wellhead
- At Banagher
- Tollund
- Postscript
