= District and Circle =

Poetry collection by Seamus Heaney

- Cover of British hardback edition
- Author: Seamus Heaney
- Language: English
- Genre: Poetry Collection
- Publisher: Faber and Faber (UK); Farrar, Straus and Giroux (U.S.)
- Publication date: 1 April 2006 (1st edition)
- Publication place: United Kingdom
- Media type: Print
- Pages: 76
- ISBN: 0-571-23096-2 (UK hardback); ISBN 0-374-53081-5 (U.S. hardback); ISBN 0-571-23097-0 (UK paperback); ISBN 0-374-53081-5 (U.S. paperback)
- OCLC: 62891650
- Preceded by: Electric Light
- Followed by: Human Chain

District and Circle is a poetry collection by Seamus Heaney, who received the 1995 Nobel Prize in Literature. It was published in 2006 and won the 2006 T. S. Eliot Prize, the most prestigious poetry award in the UK. The collection also won the Irish Times "Poetry Now Award". (Note: Heaney won the Irish Times "Poetry Now Award" again in 2011 for his collection, Human Chain.)

Reporting on the Eliot Prize, the BBC commented in 2007, "The award is yet more confirmation, as if it was needed, of Heaney's reputation as, arguably, the English language's greatest living bard, whom author Malcolm Bradbury once described as 'the poet of poets'." In 2013, Heaney's volumes made up two-thirds of the sales of living poets in Britain.

The poet dedicated District and Circle (Note: The title alludes to how he used to travel to work in the 1960s on the District and Circle lines on the London Underground.) to the Canadian professor of Irish Studies Ann Saddlemyer. Heaney has been recorded reading this collection on the Seamus Heaney Collected Poems album.

== Contents ==
1. The Turnip-Snedder
2. Shiver
3. Polish Sleepers
4. Anahorish 1944
5. To Mick Joyce in Heaven
6. The Aerodrome
7. Anything Can Happen
8. Helmet
9. Out of Shot
10. Rilke: After the Fire
11. District and Circle
12. To George Seferis in the Underworld
13. Wordsworth's Skates
14. The Harrow-Pin
15. Poet to Blacksmith
16. Midnight Anvil
17. Súgán
18. Senior Infants 1. The Sally Rod
19. Senior Infants 2. A Chow
20. Senior Infants 3. One Christmas Day in the Morning
21. The Nod
22. A Clip
23. Edward Thomas on the Lagans Road
24. Found Prose 1. The Lagans Road
25. Found Prose 2. Tall Dames
26. Found Prose 3. Boarders
27. The Lift
28. Nonce Words
29. Stern
30. Out of this World 1. 'Like Everybody Else...'
31. Out of this World 2. Brancardier
32. Out of this World 3. Saw Music
33. In Iowa
34. Höfn
35. On the Spot
36. Tollund Man in Springtime
37. Moyulla
38. Planting the Alder
39. Tate's Avenue
40. A Hagging Match
41. Fiddleheads
42. To Pablo Neruda in Tamlaghtduff
43. Home Help 1. Helping Sarah
44. Home Help 2. Chairing Mary
45. Rilke: The Apple Orchard
46. Quitting Time
47. Home Fires 1. A Scuttle for Dorothy Wordsworth
48. Home Fires 2. A Stove Lid for W.H. Auden
49. The Birch Grove
50. Cavafy: 'The Rest I'll Speak of to the Ones Below in Hades’
51. In a Loaning
52. The Blackbird of Glanmore

== Critical reception ==
The poetry in District and Circle has been widely and positively reviewed by the critics.

In the Observer Review Andrew Motion wrote, "Due in large part to the richness of his language, and also to the undiminished freshness of his response to time-honoured things, its consolidations have the feel of celebrations. The book does not merely dig in, but digs deep." The poet and critic Stephanie Burt also praised the book, writing that "anyone who isn’t impressed isn’t listening." Brad Leithauser, in The New York Times, praised Heaney for "saying something extraordinary while, line by line, conveying a sense that this is something an ordinary person might actually say".

The critic Peter McDonald said "The book contains marvellous prose-poems on the peopled landscapes of his schooldays, along with sonnets - seemingly effortless in their sheer fluency, but memorably tough and intent". Stephen Knight wrote that District and Circle was not "as immediate as his earlier work," but he still considered the book to be successful on its own terms, characterizing it as "a late flowering."
