= Stations (poetry collection) =

1975 prose-poetry collection by Seamus Heaney

- First edition
- Author: Seamus Heaney
- Language: English
- Publisher: Ulsterman Publications
- Publication date: 1975
- Publication place: United Kingdom
- Media type: Print
- Pages: 24 pp
- ISBN: 0-903048-04-3

Stations is a collection of prose poems by Seamus Heaney, who received the 1995 Nobel Prize in Literature. It was published in 1975.

This particular collection presents a style of writing which was then new to Heaney, known as "verse paragraphs" or prose poems. He believed this style of poetry was his own invention, but halfway through writing the collection, while teaching in an American university in 1971, English poet, Geoffrey Hill published a collection of poetry called "Mercian Hymns", which were presented in this style of "prose poems".

In Heaney's own words "What I had regarded as stolen marches in a form new to me, had been headed off by a work of complete authority".

However, upon his return to Ireland, Heaney completed and published Stations in 1975. It includes 21 poems. Among the collection are poems such as "Nesting Grounds", "England's Difficulty" and "Cloistered," which return to Heaney's childhood, although the difference between these and earlier poems being that while previously they were written with a child's eye view, now many of these poems were written from an adult's perspective of their childhood self, particularly "Nesting Ground," which shows a more cautious side to Heaney's childhood.

== See also ==
- Prose poetry
