= Door into the Dark =

1969 poetry collection by Seamus Heaney

- First edition (Faber and Faber)
- Author: Seamus Heaney
- Language: English
- Publisher: Faber and Faber
- Publication date: 1969
- Media type: Print
- Pages: 64 pp
- ISBN: 9780571101269
- Preceded by: Death of a Naturalist
- Followed by: Wintering Out

Door into the Dark (1969) is a poetry collection by Seamus Heaney, who received the 1995 Nobel Prize in Literature. Poems include "Requiem for the Croppies", "Thatcher" and "The Wife's Tale". Heaney has been recorded reading this collection on the Seamus Heaney Collected Poems album.

== Contents ==
- Night-Piece
- Gone
- Dream
- The Outlaw
- The Salmon Fisher to the Salmon
- The Forge
- Thatcher
- The Peninsula
- In Gallarus Oratory
- Girls Bathing, Galway, 1965
- Requiem for the Croppies
- Rite of Spring
- Undine
- The Wife's Tale
- Mother
- Cana Revisited
- Elegy for a Still-born Child
- Victorian Guitar
- Night Drive
- At Ardboe Point
- Relic of Memory
- A Lough Neagh Sequence 1. Up the Shore
- A Lough Neagh Sequence 2. Beyond Sargasso
- A Lough Neagh Sequence 3. Bait
- A Lough Neagh Sequence 4. Setting
- A Lough Neagh Sequence 5. Lifting
- A Lough Neagh Sequence 6. The Return
- A Lough Neagh Sequence 7. Vision
- The Given Note
- Whinlands
- The Plantation
- Shoreline
- Bann Clay
- Bogland
