= Human Chain (poetry collection) =

2010 book by Seamus Heaney

- Cover of British hardback edition
- Author: Seamus Heaney
- Language: English
- Genre: Poetry
- Publisher: Faber and Faber, Farrar, Straus and Giroux (US)
- Publication date: 2 September 2010
- Publication place: United Kingdom
- Media type: Print
- Pages: 96
- ISBN: 0-571-26922-2 (UK hardback); ISBN 0-374-17351-6 (US hardback)
- OCLC: 624414074
- Preceded by: District and Circle

Human Chain is the twelfth and final poetry collection by Seamus Heaney. It was first published in 2010 by the Faber and Faber.

== Contents ==
- "Had I not been awake"
- Album: I
- Album: II
- Album: III
- Album: IV
- Album: V
- The Conway Stewart
- Uncoupled: I
- Uncoupled: II
- The Butts
- Chanson d'Aventure: I
- Chanson d'Aventure: II
- Chanson d'Aventure: III
- Miracle
- Human Chain
- A Mite-Box
- An Old Refrain
- The Wood Road
- The Baler
- Derry Derry Down
- Eelworks
- Slack
- A Herbal
- Canopy
- The Riverbank Field
- Route 110: I
- Route 110: II
- Route 110: III
- Route 110: IV
- Route 110: V
- Route 110: VI
- Route 110: VII
- Route 110: VIII
- Route 110: IX
- Route 110: X
- Route 110: XI
- Route 110: XII
- Death of a Painter
- Loughanure
- Wraiths: I Sidhe
- Wraiths: II Parking Lot
- Wraiths: III White Nights
- Sweeney Out-Takes: I Otterboy
- Sweeney Out-Takes: II He Remembers Lynchechaun
- Sweeney Out-Takes: III The Pattern
- Colum Cille Cecinit
- Hermit Songs
- "Lick the pencil"
- "The door was open and the house was dark"
- In the Attic
- A Kite for Aibhín

== Reception ==
Colm Tóibín of The Guardian called it Heaney's "best single volume for many years" and "one that contains some of the best poems he has written". He further writes "Heaney allows this struggle between the lacrimae rerum and the consolations of poetry to have a force which is satisfying because its result is so tentative and uncertain. Memory here can be filled with tones of regret and even undertones of anguish, but it also can appear with a sense of hard-won wonder. There is an active urge to capture the living breath of things, but he also allows sorrow into his poems." Kate Kellaway of The Observer wrote "Human Chain is about inheritance – in the fullest sense of the word. If it were a poet such as Philip Larkin writing, human chain would mean "man hands on misery to man". But what makes Seamus Heaney's writing so fortifying is, partly, his temperament: his human chain is tolerant, durable, compassionate and every link is reinforced by literature." Luke Smith of The Oxonian Review wrote, "Heaney is now 71, and Human Chain is his first book since the stroke. It should not surprise us, then, that the poems here concern themselves with mortality, itself so finely expressed in the title poem, where the comparison is drawn to the moment of release in slinging sacks of grain onto a trailer."

Poet William Logan, in his review for The New York Times Book Review, wrote "'Human Chain' is far from Heaney's best book — the short and short-winded sequences rarely smolder like a peat bog afire underground. He's still good at the character sketches from the Irish hinterlands, the deft evocations of common objects (the evidence of the ordinary bewitches him), the elegies and funerals that increasingly have dominated his work. Troubled by the losses memory is heir to, most moving on his father's decline and death, the poems are evocations of a life now past." Irish Poet Eamon Grennan in his review for The Irish Times, wrote "As always, of course, it's his [Heaney] language, as it translates the world into a world of words, that is a continuous instruction and delight, its colloquial ease given heft by its unabashed rootedness in the eloquence of literature – which is here, as it has always been, a field he paces with the same alert poise with which he might scan the intimate acres of Bellaghy or Glanmore."

== Awards ==
It won the Forward Poetry Prize Best Collection 2010 award and the Irish Times Poetry Now Award for 2011, this was Heaney's second Poetry Now Award, having previously won in 2007 for District and Circle. It was also shortlisted for the 2011 Griffin Poetry Prize.
