= Peter Glob =

Danish archaeologist

- Born: February 20, 1911; Kalundborg, Denmark
- Died: July 20, 1985 (aged 74); Djursland, Denmark
- Occupations: Archeologist, professor, Director General
- Known for: Co-founded Scandinavian Institute of Comparative Vandalism
- Partner: Harriet Roepstorff
- Children: 5

Academic background
- Education: University of Copenhagen

Academic work
- Era: Iron and Bronze ages
- Institutions: National Museum of Denmark, Aarhus University
- Main interests: Bog bodies
- Notable works: Denmark: An Archaeological History from the Stone Age to the Vikings

Peter Vilhelm Glob (20 February 1911 – 20 July 1985), also known as P. V. Glob, was a Danish archaeologist.

Glob was most noted for his investigations of Denmark's bog bodies such as the Tollund Man and Grauballe Man, mummified remains of Iron and Bronze Age people found preserved within peat bogs. His anthropological works include The Bog People: Iron Age Man Preserved, Denmark: An Archaeological History from the Stone Age to the Vikings, and Mound People: Danish Bronze-Age Man Preserved.

== Biography ==
Glob was a student of archaeology at the University of Copenhagen. He published his dissertation and was awarded his PhD in 1944. He worked for the National Museum of Denmark from 1937 to 1949, then as a professor at Aarhus University from 1949 until 1960, and then as Director General of Museums and Antiquities for the state of Denmark (Riksantikvaren) from 1960 to 1981. He was co-founder of the Scandinavian Institute of Comparative Vandalism, an institution which studied the history of graffiti. His most famous investigation was that of the Tollund Man.

Glob was also heavily engaged in archaeology of the Middle East and led several scientific expeditions there. In the 1950s he discovered and excavated the ruins of the ancient Dilmun civilization on the island country of Bahrain. In 1954 he and his team uncovered the Barbar Temple, considered to be part of the Dilmun culture.

== Personal life ==
Peter Glob was born at Kalundborg on the Danish island of Zealand, the son of the Danish painter Johannes Glob (1882–1955). He later married Harriet Roepstorff and they had five children, including the ceramic artist Lotte Glob. He died at Djursland in 1985.

== Select bibliography ==
- Mosefolket – Jernalderens mennesker bevaret i 2000 år, Gyldendal, 1965
- The Bog People: Iron-Age Man Preserved, translated from the Danish by Rupert Bruce-Mitford. Faber and Faber, 1969, 304 pg. (New York Review Books, 2004).
- Denmark: An Archaeological History from the Stone Age to the Vikings, Cornell University Press, 1971, 351 pg, ISBN 0-8014-0641-2
- Danish Prehistoric Monuments, Faber and Faber, 1971, 351, ISBN 0-571-08782-5

(The two previous book editions derive from the same original book written in Danish: Danske Oltidsminder, best translated as Memorials of Ancient Denmark. See American Anthropologist, Volume 75, Issue 6, page 1940.)

- Mound People: Danish Bronze-Age Man Preserved, Cornell University Press, 1974, 184 pg, ISBN 978-0-8014-0800-7
- Danefæ. Til Hendes Majestaet Dronning Margrethe II, 16 April 1980.

== Other sources ==
- Højlund, Flemming (1999): Glob and the Garden of Eden: the Danish expeditions to the Arabian Gulf (Moesgård Museum, trans. Peter Crabb)
- Bibby, Geoffrey (1969) Looking for Dilmun (Alfred A. Knopf)
- Fischer, Christian (2007) Tollundmanden: gaven til guderne: mosefund fra Danmarks forhistorie (Silkeborg: Silkeborg Museum) ISBN 978-87-7739-966-4
