= Sweeney Astray =

Seamus Heaney translation of Buile Shuibhne

Sweeney Astray: A Version from the Irish
- First edition
- Author: Seamus Heaney
- Language: English
- Publisher: Field Day Publications, Derry/Dublin
- Publication date: 1983-11-01
- Publication place: Ireland
- Pages: 85
- ISBN: 0-946755-03-5
- OCLC: 11339072
- Dewey Decimal: 821/.914 19
- LC Class: PR6058.E2 S9 1984b

Sweeney Astray: A Version from the Irish is a version of the Irish poem Buile Shuibhne written by Seamus Heaney, based on an earlier edition and translation by J. G. O'Keeffe. The work was first published in 1983 and won the 1985 PEN Translation Prize for poetry.

Photographer Rachel Giese and Heaney later collaborated to juxtapose selected passages of Heaney's translation with Giese's photographs of sites mentioned in the text, a work published as Sweeney's Flight.

== Editions ==
- Seamus Heaney, Sweeney Astray: A Version from the Irish (Derry: Field Day Publications, 1983), ISBN 0-946755-03-5
- Seamus Heaney, Sweeney Astray (London: Faber, 1984), ISBN 0571133606
- Seamus Heaney and Rachael Giese, Sweeney's Flight: Based on the Revised Text of 'Sweeney Astray', with the Complete Revised Text of 'Sweeney Astray' (New York: Farrar Straus Giroux, 1992); pp. 85–117 print the complete text, with revisions
- Seamus Heaney, Sweeney Astray (London: Faber and Faber, 2001) ISBN 0571210090; prints the revised text first published in Sweeney's Flight

=== Anthologisations ===
Selections from Sweeney Astray appear in:

- Seamus Heaney, New Selected Poems 1966–1987 (London: Faber and Faber, 1990), ISBN 9780571143726
- Seamus Heaney, Opened Ground: Poems 1966–1996 (London: Faber and Faber, 1998), ISBN 9780571262793
