= The Haw Lantern =

1987 collection of poems by Seamus Heaney

- First edition
- Author: Seamus Heaney
- Language: English
- Publisher: Faber and Faber
- Publication date: 1987
- Media type: Print
- Pages: 64 pp
- ISBN: 9780571232871
- Preceded by: Station Island
- Followed by: The Cure at Troy

The Haw Lantern (1987) is a collection of poems written by Irish poet Seamus Heaney, the recipient of the Nobel Prize in Literature in 1995. Several of the poems—including the sonnet cycle "Clearances"—explore themes of mortality and loss inspired by the death of his mother, Margaret Kathleen Heaney (the "M.K.H." referenced in the dedication to "Clearances"), who died in 1984 and of his father two years later.

The title of the collection refers to the haw fruit. The fruit is an important symbol of defiance against winter, a symbol of, the dignity of the Northern Irish in the face of violence and trouble, and offering a small piece of light and hope in the darkness. The image of the lantern evoked by the title is a reference to the traditional account of the Greek cynic philosopher Diogenes of Sinope. According to the story, Diogenes carried a lantern through the streets in search of an honest man in the light.

== Contents ==
- Alphabets
- Terminus
- From the Frontier of Writing
- The Haw Lantern
- The Stone Grinder
- A Daylight Art
- Parable Island
- From the Republic of Conscience
- Hailstones
- Two Quick Notes
- The Stone Verdict
- From the Land of the Unspoken
- A Ship of Death
- The Spoonbait
- In Memoriam: Robert Fitzgerald
- The Old Team
- Clearances: In Memoriam M.K.H.
- Clearances 1
- Clearances 2
- Clearances 3
- Clearances 4
- Clearances 5
- Clearances 6
- Clearances 7
- Clearances 8
- The Milk Factory
- The Summer of Lost Rachel
- The Wishing Tree
- A Postcard from Iceland
- A Peacock's Feather
- Grotus and Coventina
- Holding Course
- The Song of the Bullets
- Wolfe Tone
- A Shooting Script
- From the Canton of Expectation
- The Mud Vision
- The Disappearing Island
- The Riddle

== See also ==
- Seamus Heaney Collected Poems
