= Death of a Naturalist =

Collection of poems by Seamus Heaney

- First edition
- Author: Seamus Heaney
- Language: English
- Publisher: Faber and Faber
- Publication date: 1966
- Media type: Print
- Pages: 58 pp
- ISBN: 0-571-06665-8
- OCLC: 4686783
- Followed by: Door into the Dark

Death of a Naturalist (1966) is a collection of poems written by Seamus Heaney, who received the 1995 Nobel Prize in Literature. The collection was Heaney's first major published volume, and includes ideas that he had presented at meetings of The Belfast Group. Death of a Naturalist won the Cholmondeley Award, the Gregory Award, the Somerset Maugham Award, and the Geoffrey Faber Memorial Prize.

The work consists of 34 short poems and is largely concerned with childhood experiences and the formulation of adult identities, family relationships, and rural life. The collection begins with one of Heaney's best-known poems, "Digging", and includes the acclaimed "Death of a Naturalist" and "Mid-Term Break".

In 2022, Death of a Naturalist was included on the "Big Jubilee Read" list of 70 books by Commonwealth authors, selected to celebrate the Platinum Jubilee of Elizabeth II.

== Poems ==
From Mid-term Break

Wearing a poppy bruise on his left temple,
He lay in the four foot box as in his cot.
No gaudy scars, the bumper knocked him clear.

A four foot box, a foot for every year.

— from "Mid-term break",
Death of a Naturalist (1966)

"Death of a Naturalist", the collection's second poem, details the exploits of a young boy collecting frogspawn from a flax-dam. The narrator remembers everything he saw and felt at those times. He then remembers his teacher telling him all about frogs in a section that speaks volumes about childhood innocence. Finally, we hear about a trip to the flax-dam that went wrong. He feels threatened by the frogs and flees. His interest in nature has gone – this is the death of a "naturalist" suggested in the poem's title. The poem makes extensive use of onomatopoeia and a simile that compares the behaviour of the amphibians to warfare ("Some sat poised like mud grenades") amongst other techniques.

"Mid-Term Break" is a reflection on the death of Heaney's younger brother, Christopher, while Heaney was at school. He describes his parents' different ways of displaying grief, visitors paying their respects, and his encounter of his brother's corpse in its coffin the next morning. The poem focuses on concrete particulars of Heaney's experience and "captures a boy's unfolding consciousness of death." The final line ("A four foot box, a foot for every year.") emphasizes death's finality.

"Digging" is one of Heaney's most-read poems. It addresses themes of time and history and the cyclical nature of the two through the narrator's characterization of his grandfather digging in the bog on their family farm. He admires his grandfather's skill and relationship to the spade, but states that he will dig with his pen instead. This is significant as it demonstrates Heaney's ownership of his occupation as a poet and names his pen as his primary and most powerful tool. While excavating the mental bog of his mind by writing, Heaney believes he can gain a better understanding of the history living in the land around him, and a better understanding of himself.

From Digging

Between my finger and my thumb
The squat pen rests.
I'll dig with it.

— from "Digging",
Death of a Naturalist (1966)

"Personal Helicon" is the final poem in Heaney's first collection. Helicon refers to the mountain in Greek mythology which is dedicated to the Greek God Apollo, who is the God of poetry. On the mountain live nine muses, each of whom represent a poetic inspiration. In Heaney's Helicon is a well which indicates that his inspiration comes from within the earth rather than above it. This theme resonates across his work in the poem "Digging" or in the later Bog Poems. He also states that he rhymes "to see myself", echoing the common theme found in the poem "Digging" that he uses poetry to understand the depths of the well and his reflection within it. Throughout the poem, Heaney walks the reader through each stage of his life up until the point he wrote Personal Helicon. He expresses to the reader how he loses sight of the outside inspirations he sought after as a child, and instead looks to himself. This can be seen when he states, "To stare, big-eyed Narcissus into some spring is beneath all adult dignity". In this quote he parallels himself to Narcissus, a hunter in Greek Mythology who is cursed to fall in love with his own reflection by the goddess Nemesis after he shuns an admirer. The reader can see that for a short time after his college experience, Heaney relies on only himself for inspiration. Eventually he realizes his mistake, and unlike Narcissus, is able to bring himself back to reality.

== Reception ==
Death of a Naturalist was received with mostly positive reviews and helped Heaney gain recognition on an international scale. Several of the poems had been published previously in pamphlets like "Eleven Poems" (1965) and gained attention with reviews in the Belfast Telegraph, Death of a Naturalist received over 30 noteworthy reviews in Ireland, England and the United States. Fellow poets Michael Longley and Brendan Kennelly also praised Heaney's work. Critics generally remarked on Heaney's skilful use of metaphor and language as well as his attention to detail and rural imagery. Some reviewers found the volume a bit superfluous. John Unterecker of The New York Times Book Review stated that he found some poems possessed "a wit that is sometimes heavy-handed".

== Contents ==
- Digging
- Death of a Naturalist
- The Barn
- An Advancement of Learning
- Blackberry-Picking
- Churning Day
- The Early Purges
- Follower
- Ancestral Photograph
- Mid-Term Break
- Dawn Shoot
- At a Potato Digging
- For the Commander of the 'Eliza'
- The Diviner
- Turkeys Observed
- Cow in Calf
- Trout
- Waterfall
- Docker
- Poor Women in a City Church
- Gravities
- Twice Shy
- Valediction
- Lovers on Aran
- Poem
- Honeymoon Flight
- Scaffolding
- Storm on the Island
- Synge on Aran
- Saint Francis and the Birds
- In Small Townlands
- The Folk Singers
- The Play Way
- Personal Helicon

== See also ==
- Seamus Heaney Collected Poems
