= Wintering Out =

Poetry collection by Seamus Heaney

- First edition
- Author: Seamus Heaney
- Language: English
- Publisher: Faber and Faber
- Publication date: 1972
- Media type: Print
- Pages: 80
- ISBN: 978-0-571-10158-0
- Preceded by: Door into the Dark
- Followed by: North

What do I say if they wheel out their dead?

— from "Stump",
Wintering Out (1972)

Wintering Out (1972) is a poetry collection by Seamus Heaney, who received the 1995 Nobel Prize in Literature.

== Importance of Place ==
=== California/Liberation ===
The volume contains poems written between 1969 and 1971. Heaney wrote much of the collection while he was on sabbatical at the University of California, Berkeley, in 1971. Heaney has said that his time in California had a liberating effect on the form of his poetry: "In the poems of Wintering Out, in the little quatrain shapes, there are signs of that loosening, the California spirit, a more relaxed movement to the verse." Heaney writes explicitly about California in the poem "Westering."

=== Ireland ===
While the poems in Wintering Out are more formally open, they also demonstrate Heaney's intensifying commitment to rooting his poetry in the Irish landscape. Throughout the collection, Heaney uses linguistic cues and place names to develop a sense of community and forge a connection with the Irish past. Poems like "Toome," "Broagh," and "Anahorish" are rich with allusions to Irish language and topography, while "Shore Woman" and "Maighdean Mara" draw on Irish folklore and proverbs. Heaney explained the importance of the Irish landscape in Wintering Out during an interview with literary critic Seamus Deane. Deane asked Heaney if he intended to create a "cultural landscape" with his poetry, and if Heaney insists "that this landscape be distinctly of this culture." Heaney responded: "Yes I think I came to this notion in the writing of the Wintering Out collection, particularly in the place name poems: 'Anahorish', 'Broagh', and so on. I had a great sense of release as they were being written, a joy and devil-may-careness, and that convinced me that one could be faithful to the nature of the English language ... and, at the same time, be faithful to one's own non-English origin ..." This quote shows that a sense of "place" was very important to Heaney in the formation of Wintering Out. As Heaney said, the place name poems were his mode for rooting the collection in Ireland, acknowledging his own origins, even while doing so in the English language.

=== Bogs ===
Wintering Out also contains one of Heaney's most important bog poems. In "Tollund Man," Heaney builds upon the image of the bog that he introduces in Door into the Dark's "Bogland." Heaney was deeply moved by P.V. Glob's study of the mummified Iron Age bodies found in Jutland's peat bogs. Bogs were a familiar feature of the Northern Irish landscape and Heaney found contemporary political relevance in the relics of the ritualistic killings.

== Politics ==
In Wintering Out, Heaney grapples with the place of politics in his poetry. In the late 1960s and early 1970s the sectarian violence of the Troubles was on the rise. Heaney felt pressure to act as a spokesperson for the Catholic minority of Northern Ireland. He moved from Belfast to County Wicklow in the Republic of Ireland shortly after the publication of Wintering Out. In North, Heaney's next and most controversial volume, he returns to the bog bodies with more explicitly political poems.

Some critics, such as Eavan Boland of the Irish Times, applauded Heaney for his engagement with "mature" political themes. However, others expressed disappointment that Heaney did not do more to address the Troubles head on. The tension around how the poet wrote about the Troubles would continue to be of interest in the critical reception of following volumes like North published in 1975, and are the subject of several interviews with the poet himself such as Heaney's 1977 interview with Seamus Dean "Unhappy and at Home".

Heaney has been recorded reading this collection on the Seamus Heaney Collected Poems.

== Contents ==
- For David Hammond and Michael Longley
- Fodder
- Bog Oak
- Anahorish
- Servant Boy
- The Last Mummer
- Land
- Gifts of Rain
- Toome
- Broagh
- Oracle
- The Backward Look
- Traditions
- A New Song
- The Other Side
- The Wool Trade
- Linen Town
- A Northern Hoard 1. Roots
- A Northern Hoard 2. No Man's Land
- A Northern Hoard 3. Stump
- A Northern Hoard 4. No Sanctuary
- A Northern Hoard 5. Tinder
- Midnight
- The Tollund man
- Nerthus
- Cairn-maker
- Navvy
- Veteran's Dream
- Augury
- Wedding Day
- Mother of the Groom
- Summer Home
- Serenades
- Somnambulist
- A Winter's Tale
- Shore Woman
- Maighdean Mara
- Limbo
- Bye-Child
- Good-night
- First Calf
- May
- Fireside
- Dawn
- Travel
- Westering
