= English PEN =

English writers association (founded 1921)

- Formation: 1921; 105 years ago
- Type: Literary society, human rights organisation
- Legal status: Non-governmental organisation
- Official language: English
- Key people: Board of Trustees
- Website: www.englishpen.org

Founded in 1921, English PEN is one of the world's first non-governmental organisations and among the first international bodies advocating for human rights. English PEN was the founding centre of PEN International, a worldwide writers' association with 145 centres in more than 100 countries. The President of English PEN is Margaret Busby, succeeding Philippe Sands in April 2023. The Director is Daniel Gorman. The Chair is Ruth Borthwick.

English PEN celebrates the diversity of literature and envisions a world with free expression and equity of opportunity for all by supporting writers at risk and campaigning for freedom of expression nationally and internationally. English PEN also hosts events and prizes to champion international literature, showcase the diversity of writing, and celebrate literary courage. By supporting literature in translation into English and developing opportunities for publishers, translators and translated voices, English PEN aims to encourage diversity in the literary landscape.

== History ==
English PEN was founded by novelist Catherine Amy Dawson Scott in 1921. Its inaugural meeting, at which John Galsworthy was appointed president, was held at the Florence Restaurant in Soho on 5 October 1921. Forty-one writers, in addition to Catherine Dawson Scott and her daughter Marjorie, attended this Foundation Dinner, and all joined the club, becoming known as Foundation Members. They included Austin Harrison, F. Tennyson Jesse, May Sinclair and Rebecca West.

The acronym behind the P.E.N. Club, as it was then known, stood for: Poets, Playwrights, Editors, Essayists and Novelists. Dawson Scott envisioned a club that would connect writers worldwide to create a common meeting ground in every country for all writers.

Dawson Scott's hopes of establishing an international network of writers were swiftly realised. Within three years, there were 19 PEN clubs around the world. The first meeting of what would become the annual PEN Congress was held in London in May 1923, and was attended by representatives from 11 countries. With an ever-growing number of members worldwide, it became necessary to establish some guiding principles for the organisation, and the first version of the PEN Charter principles was passed at the 1927 Congress in Brussels.

In 1940, English PEN published its "Appeal to the Conscience of the World" letter, a plea for the protection of freedom of expression written by English PEN's first woman president, Storm Jameson, and co-signed by English writers including Vita Sackville-West, E. M. Forster, H. G. Wells, Vera Brittain, and Rebecca West.

Following World War II, English PEN played a significant role in the emerging discourse around human rights, and was the first organisation to frame freedom of expression as a necessary precondition to literary creation. PEN International gained advisory status to the United Nations and worked with UNESCO on various initiatives. It continued to expand with new centres opening across the world, and continued to fight for the rights of imprisoned writers, writers in exile, and censored writers.

English PEN celebrated its centenary in 2021. "Common Currency", the title of the centenary events, is taken from the PEN Charter: "Literature knows no frontiers and must remain a common currency among people in spite of political or national upheavals." The centenary programme included events, residencies and workshops online and across the UK, culminating with a three-day festival of free thinking at London's Southbank Centre in September 2021.

In December 2021, having served as a trustee of English PEN since 2019, Ruth Borthwick was named as its chair, taking over the position from Maureen Freely, with Aki Schilz as vice-chair, taking over from Claire Armitstead.

== The PEN Charter ==
The PEN Charter has guided PEN members for over 60 years, since it was approved at the 1948 PEN Congress in Copenhagen. Like the Universal Declaration of Human Rights, the PEN Charter was forged amidst the harsh realities of World War II.

The Charter was amended at the 83rd PEN Congress in Lviv in 2017 for the first time since it was adopted 90 years earlier. The Assembly voted for a wider formulation, namely counteracting hate and not only based on race, class or nationality but also gender, religion and other categories of identity. Consequently, Article 3 of the Charter reads as follows: "PEN members should at all times use their impact for mutual understanding and respect between nations; they commit to do everything to dispel all types of hate and support the ideal of unified humanity living in peace."

== Membership ==
English PEN is a membership organisation, with a community of more than 1,000 members including novelists, journalists, nonfiction writers, editors, poets, essayists, playwrights, publishers, translators, agents, human rights activists, and readers. English PEN membership is open to all who subscribe to the aims outlined in the PEN Charter.

== Board of trustees ==
English PEN is governed by a board of trustees that is elected from and by members, and chaired by Ruth Borthwick, former chief executive and artistic director of the Arvon Foundation.

Current trustees include:

- Aki Schilz, Director of The Literary Consultancy
- Dan Miller, communications professional
- Shazea Quraishi, poet, playwright and translator
- Cathy Galvin, poet, journalist and editor
- Georgina Godwin, broadcast journalist
- Ted Hodgkinson, Head of Literature and Spoken Word at Southbank Centre
- Milena Büyüm, Senior Campaigner at Amnesty International
- Guy Gunaratne, journalist, filmmaker and novelist
- Can Yeğinsu, barrister and Deputy Chair of the High Level Panel of Legal Experts on Media Freedom
- Arifa Akbar, chief theatre critic for The Guardian
- Joanna Stocks

== Past Presidents of English PEN ==
English PEN Centre presidents
John Galsworthy	1921–32
H. G. Wells	1932–36
J. B. Priestley	1937
Henry W. Nevinson	1938
Margaret Storm Jameson	1939–44
Desmond MacCarthy	1945–50
Veronica Wedgwood	1951–57
Richard Church	1958
Alan Pryce-Jones	1959–61
Rosamond Lehmann	1962–66
L. P. Hartley	1967–70
V. S. Pritchett	1971–75
Kathleen Nott	1975
Stephen Spender	1976–77
Lettice Cooper	1977–78
Francis King	1979–85
Michael Holroyd	1986–87
Antonia Fraser	1988–90
Ronald Harwood	1990–93
Josephine Pullein-Thompson	1994–97
Rachel Billington	1998–2000
Victoria Glendinning	2001–03
Alastair Niven	2003–07
Lisa Appignanesi	2008–10
Gillian Slovo	2010–13
Raficq Abdulla (acting president)	2013–14
Maureen Freely	2014–2018
Philippe Sands	2018–2023
Margaret Busby	2023–

== Memorial ==
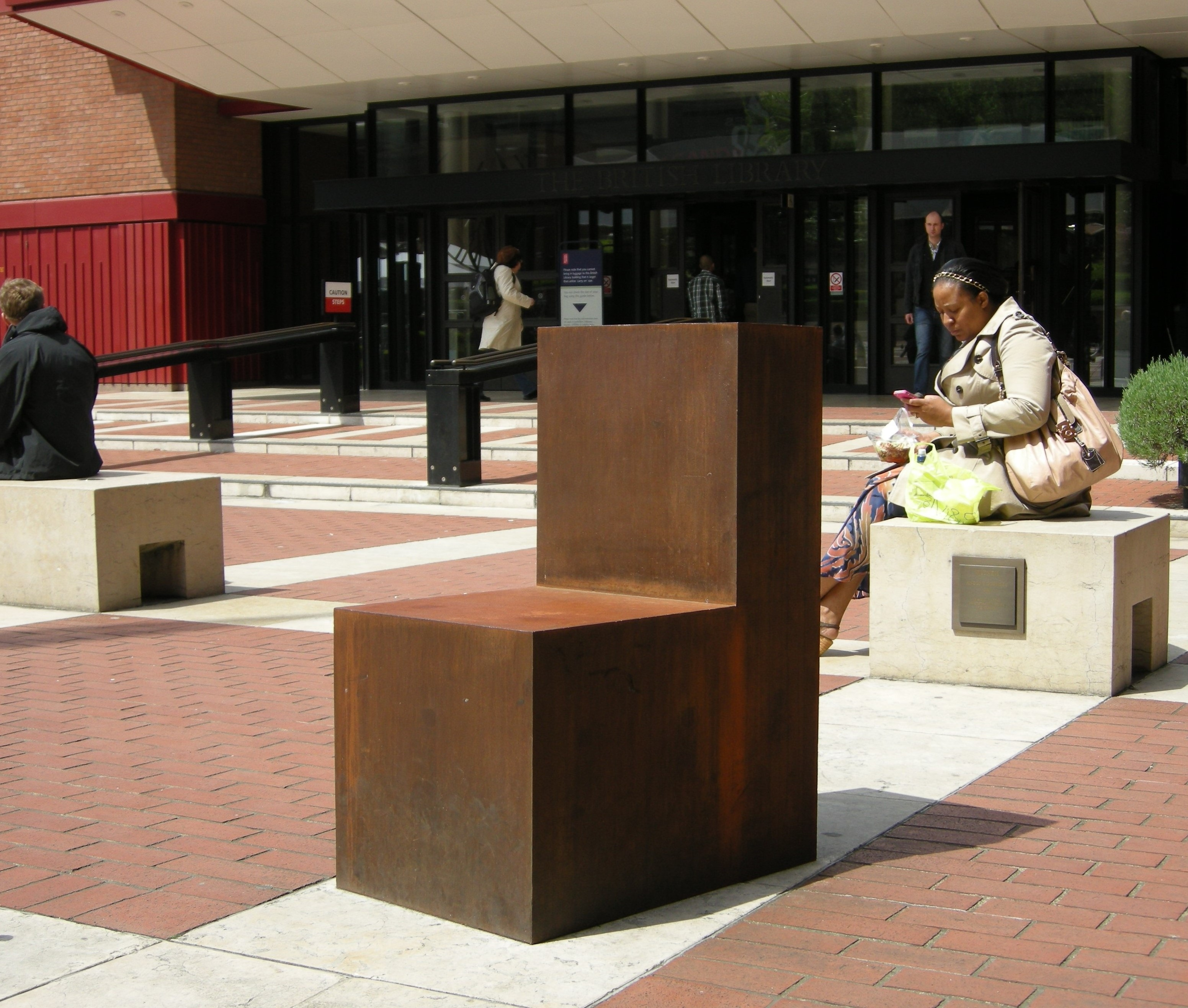
Antony Gormley's Witness, on the piazza of the British Library, London

A cast-iron sculpture entitled Witness, commissioned by English PEN to mark their 90th anniversary and created by Antony Gormley, stands outside the British Library in London. It depicts an empty chair, and is inspired by the symbol used for thirty years by English PEN to represent imprisoned writers around the world. The memorial was unveiled on 13 December 2011.

== Prizes ==
English PEN runs three annual awards – the PEN Pinter Prize, the PEN Hessell-Tiltman Prize, and the PEN Heaney Prize. Until 2023 it also ran the PEN/Ackerley Prize. Funded by and in honour of former PEN members and significant literary figures, these prizes recognise excellence in historical nonfiction, literary autobiography, and a courageous and unflinching approach to the written word.

=== PEN Pinter Prize ===
Established in 2009 in memory of Nobel Laureate playwright Harold Pinter, the PEN Pinter Prize is awarded annually to a writer from Britain, the Republic of Ireland, or the Commonwealth who, in the words of Harold Pinter's Nobel speech, casts an "unflinching, unswerving" gaze upon the world, and shows a "fierce intellectual determination ... to define the real truth of our lives and our societies".

The prize is shared with an international writer of courage selected by the winner in association with English PEN's Writers at Risk programme.

Winners of the PEN Pinter Prize: Tony Harrison (2009), Hanif Kureishi (2010), Sir David Hare (2011), Carol Ann Duffy (2012), Tom Stoppard (2013), Salman Rushdie (2014), James Fenton (2015), Margaret Atwood (2016), Michael Longley (2017), Chimamanda Ngozi Adichie (2018), Lemn Sissay (2019), Linton Kwesi Johnson (2020), Tsitsi Dangarembga (2021), Malorie Blackman (2022), Michael Rosen (2023), and Arundhati Roy (2024).

International Writers of Courage: "Zarganar" Maung Thura (2009), Lydia Cacho (2010), Roberto Saviano (2011), Samar Yazbek (2012), Iryna Khalip (2013), Mazen Darwish (2014), Raif Badawi (2015), Ahmedur Rashid Chowdhury (Tutul) (2016), Mahvash Sabet (2017), Waleed Abulkhair (2018), Befeqadu Hailu (2019), Amanuel Asrat (2020), Kakwenza Rukirabashaija (2021), Abduljalil al-Singace (2022), and Rahile Dawut.

=== PEN Hessell-Tiltman Prize ===
The PEN Hessell-Tiltman Prize of £2,000 is awarded annually for a non-fiction book of specifically historical content.

Past winners include: Anita Anand's The Patient Assassin (2020), Edward Wilson-Lee's The Catalogue of Shipwrecked Books (2019), S. A. Smith's Russia in Revolution (2018), David Olusoga's Black and British (2017), Nicholas Stargardt's The German War (2016), Jessie Child's God's Traitors (2015), David Reynolds' The Long Shadow (2014), Keith Lowe's Savage Continent (2013), James Gleick's The Information (2012), Toby Wilkinson's The Rise and Fall of Ancient Egypt (2011), Diarmaid MacCulloch's A History of Christianity (2010), Mark Thompson's The White War (2009), Clair Wills' That Neutral Island (2008), Vic Gatrell's City of Laughter (2007), Bryan Ward Perkins' The Fall of Rome (2006), Paul Fussell's The Boys' Crusade (2005), Richard Overy's The Dictators (2005), Tom Holland's Rubicon (2004), Jenny Uglow's The Lunar Men (2003), and Margaret Macmillan's Peacemakers (2002).

=== PEN Heaney Prize ===
The PEN Heaney Prize, launched in 2024, is run as a partnership between English PEN, Irish PEN and the estate of Seamus Heaney. The annual award of £5,000 is bestowed on a volume of poetry "of outstanding literary merit" which "engages with the impact of cultural or political events on human conditions or relationships."

The first winner of the PEN Heaney prize was Susannah Dickey's ISDAL.

=== PEN/Ackerley Prize ===
The Ackerley Prize (known as the PEN/Ackerley Prize until 2023, when its association with English PEN ended) is awarded in J. R. Ackerley's memory for a literary autobiography of excellence. The prize is judged by the trustees of the J. R. Ackerley Trust.

Past winners include: Alison Light's A Radical Romance (2020), Yrsa Daley-Ward's The Terrible (2019), Richard Beard's The Day That Went Missing (2018), Amy Liptrot's The Outrun (2017), Alice Jolly's Dead Babies and Seaside Towns (2016), Henry Marsh's Do No Harm (2015), Sonali Deraniyagala's The Wave (2014), Richard Holloway's Leaving Alexandria (2013), Duncan Fallowell's How To Disappear (2012), Michael Frayn's My Father's Fortune (2011), Gabriel Weston's Direct Red (2010), Julia Blackburn's The Three of Us (2009), Miranda Seymour's In My Father's House (2008), Brian Thompson's Keeping Mum (2007), Alan Bennett's Untold Stories (2006), Jonathan Gathorne-Hardy's Half an Arch (2005), Bryan Magee's Clouds of Glory (2004), Jenny Diski's Stranger on a Train (2003), Michael Foss' Out of India (2002), Lorna Sage's Bad Blood (2001), Mark Frankland's Child Of My Time (2000), Margaret Forster's Precious Lives (1999), Katrin Fitzherbet's True To Both My Selves (1998), Tim Lott's The Scent of Dried Roses (1997), Eric Lomax's The Railway Man (1996), Paul Vaughan's Something in Linoleum (1995), Blake Morrison's And When Did You Last See Your Father? (1994), Barry Humphries' More Please (1993), John Osborne's Almost a Gentleman (1992), Paul Binding's St Martin's Ride (1991), Germaine Greer's Daddy, We Hardly Knew You (1990), John Healy's The Grass Arena (1989), Anthony Burgess' Little Wilson and Big God (1988), Diana Athill's After a Funeral (1987), Dan Jacobson's Time and Time Again (1986), Angelica Garnett's Deceived with Kindness (1985), Richard Cobb's Still Life (1984), Kathleen Dayus' Her People (1983), Ted Walker's High Path (1983), and Edward Blishen's Shaky Relations (1982).

== Writers at Risk ==
Founded in 1960, English PEN's Writers at Risk Programme (formerly the Writers in Prison Committee) is one of the world's longest running campaigns for freedom of expression. English PEN campaigns on behalf of writers, literary professionals, journalists, artists, cartoonists and musicians who are unjustly persecuted, harassed, imprisoned, and even murdered in violation of their right to freedom of expression.

=== Residency programme ===
English PEN's Writers in Residence programme aims to provide international writers facing persecution or censorship with a period of respite. Former residents include Zehra Doğan and Nurcan Baysal.

== Freedom of expression in the UK ==
=== Libel reform ===
In 2009, English PEN and Index on Censorship ran a year-long Libel Inquiry. The phenomenon of libel tourism was chilling the work of investigative journalists around the world, and scientific debate was being stifled. The final report of the Inquiry, Free Speech Is Not For Sale, identified the central problems with the current libel system, and offered ideas for reform. This led to the launch of the Libel Reform Campaign with Sense about Science. The campaign secured the support of more than 60,000 people and 60 prominent NGOs, Royal Colleges, and associations. A Defamation Bill was introduced by the coalition government in 2012 and the Defamation Act was given royal assent on 25 April 2013.

=== Lady Chatterley's Lover ===
In 2018, English PEN ran a successful crowdfunding campaign to keep the judge's trial copy of Lady Chatterley's Lover used in the 1960s landmark obscenity trial in the UK. It was finally acquired by the University of Bristol in 2019.

== Translation ==
=== PEN Translates ===
The PEN Translates grant programme was launched in 2012 to encourage UK publishers to acquire more books from other languages. The award is supported by Arts Council England to help UK publishers to meet the costs of translating new works into English – while ensuring that translators are acknowledged and paid properly for their work. The programme has supported more than 250 books, in 53 languages, and awarded over £1,000,000 of funding. Titles supported by PEN Translates have featured on the last three International Booker Prize shortlists.

=== PEN Transmissions ===
PEN Transmissions is English PEN's online magazine for international and translated voices. It features interviews with and personal essays from established and emerging writers. Contributors include Svetlana Alexievich, Tsitsi Dangarembga, Priyamvada Gopal, Olga Tokarczuk, Irenosen Okojie, and Edmund de Waal.

== Outreach ==
English PEN's outreach programme, Readers & Writers, is for young people from disadvantaged backgrounds, refugees and asylum seekers, and prisoners and young offenders. It offers people the opportunity to express their voices by taking part in creative writing and reading projects. They also have the chance to explore world literature and free speech.

=== Brave New Voices ===
Thanks to funding from John Lyon's Charity and the Limbourne Trust, English PEN ran Brave New Voices 2.0, a three-year creative writing and translation project with young refugees and asylum seekers celebrating multilingualism and self-expression.

In 2018, English PEN collaborated with the BBC Proms for the Brave New Voices programme, featuring more than 90 concerts over eight-weeks during the Proms.

== Response to the Coronavirus pandemic ==
In March 2020, English PEN with the T. S. Eliot Foundation was among the founding partners of the "Authors' Emergency Fund". led by the Society of Authors, along with the Authors' Licensing and Collecting Society, the Royal Literary Fund, and Amazon UK. The fund was set up to support authors and booksellers affected financially as a result of the coronavirus outbreak with a £330,000 emergency fund to be distributed as small grants.

== Controversy ==
=== Anthony Julius and Geraldine Proudler ===
In May 2018, Private Eye identified two lawyers who were members of English PEN's Board of Trustees but who, in the course of providing legal services to their clients, were accused of being in conflict with English PEN's primary aim to defend and promote freedom of expression.

Anthony Julius is Deputy Chairman of Mishcon de Reya, a British law firm. The Maltese blogger Daphne Caruana Galizia was accused of libel by Mishcon de Reya "on the instruction of both Malta's prime minister and Henley & Partners", prior to her death in 2017. English PEN's public statement on 1 May 2018 about Caruana Galizia says:

Prime Minister Joseph Muscat is also pursuing a libel case against Caruana Galizia's son Matthew Caruana Galizia. The Shift News, an independent media outlet launched after Caruana Galizia's assassination which has pursued a number of her stories, is currently facing the threat of a financially crippling SLAPP (strategic lawsuit against public participation) from the Jersey-based firm Henley & Partners, who had taken legal proceedings against Daphne Caruana Galizia prior to her death.

PEN is seriously concerned about the fact that senior government officials including Prime Minister Joseph Muscat are insisting on trying 34 libel cases against Daphne Caruana Galizia, which have now been assumed by her family. PEN believes that these proceedings are in direct reprisal for her work in investigating corruption within the current Maltese government.

Geraldine Proudler is a lawyer and partner at Olswang, a London-based law firm, where she is Head of the Reputation and Media Litigation practice. Proudler represented Pavel Karpov, a former Russian Interior Ministry officer, for a 2012 libel action in London against Bill Browder after Browder accused Karpov of involvement in the 2009 death of Sergei Magnitsky. Karpov lost the case and was ordered to pay over £800,000 in costs. In 2016, Karpov was additionally sentenced to three months in prison for contempt of court for non-payment of costs. More than £660,000 of that amount remains unpaid.

In The Guardian, journalist Nick Cohen wrote:

I know Anthony Julius vaguely and Geraldine Proudler, one of the Olswang lawyers who went for Browder, was on the board of the Scott Trust that oversees the Guardian and Observer. (She is now on the board of an English PEN that never seems to learn.) I'm sure that in private they love investigative journalism, freedom of thought and expression, democracy and the right to hold the powerful to account. Perhaps the firms to which they belong love money more.

== Online harassment ==
On 5 October 2020, English PEN released a joint statement on online harassment (co-signed by 19 PEN centres, including PEN America, and PEN International), stating: "PEN stands firmly against both offline and online harassment" and "We support the right to hold and express strong views, provided that such expression does not undermine the internationally recognised human rights of others, incite hatred, nor engender the threat or use of violence." PEN also stated: "We are listening to and taking seriously those with experience of harassment and working with organisations to better support and protect individuals facing harassment. Additionally we will continue to put pressure on platforms to better protect and support users facing harassment."

In the 9–22 October 2020 edition, Private Eye criticised English PEN for not speaking out in defence of J. K. Rowling, after she faced online harassment following her comments about transgender people:

Thousands of Twitter users wish an author dead. Others send her rape-threats. Newsweek reports that burnings of her books are being shared on TikTok ... In 2013, Rowling gave English PEN, which defends freedom of speech, a Harry Potter first edition that was auctioned for £150,000. Last week, the Eye asked PEN repeatedly whether it defended her against the campaign of intimidation. All PEN would say was that it was "following the situation closely".
