= Ruth Borthwick =

British arts administrator

Ruth Borthwick Hon. FRSL
- Occupations: Arts administrator, literature advocate and educator
- Organization: English PEN

Ruth Borthwick, Hon. FRSL, is a British arts administrator, literature executive and educator, who for more than three decades has worked with writers in bookselling and publishing, and as an advocate for literature in the UK and internationally. In 2018, she was elected an Honorary Fellow by the Royal Society of Literature, rewarding "significant contribution to the advancement of literature". Formerly chief executive and artistic director of the Arvon Foundation for ten years (2009–2019), she has been Chair of English PEN since 2021.

== Background ==
Ruth Borthwick's early career spanned publishing, researching and bookselling in England and in Australia, where she worked in the first bookshop in Sydney to sell gay books. In 1995, she co-founded with Bernardine Evaristo London's writer development agency Spread the Word, "to encourage new voices to emerge and tell their stories".

Borthwick was for a decade chief executive of the Arvon Foundation, a leading UK charitable organisation that promotes creative writing, from 2009 until 2019, during which time she oversaw renovation of its Shropshire centre The Hurst, expanded work with teachers and launched a new digital programme. From 2000 to 2007, she directed the Literature and Talks programme at London's Southbank Centre, where she founded the children's literature festival "Imagine", and revived Poetry International, a biennial festival inaugurated by Ted Hughes. She also headed the "Planet Poetry" initiative, a consortium of poetry organizations, that aimed to "help develop a new economy for poets and poetry by increasing the number, range and diversity of people who engage with poetry".

International initiatives with which she has worked over the years include the annual NGC Bocas Lit Fest in Trinidad, and the British Council's 2016 collaboration with the Yasnaya Polyana Museum-Estate of Leo Tolstoy.

In December 2021, having served as a trustee of English PEN since 2019, Borthwick was named as its Chair, taking over the position from writer, translator and academic Maureen Freely, with Aki Schilz (Director of The Literary Consultancy) as vice-chair, taking over from journalist Claire Armitstead.

== Awards and recognition ==
In 2018, Borthwick was elected an Honorary Fellow of The Royal Society of Literature, an award made for "significant contribution to the advancement of literature".
