= Rebecca Swift =

British poet and essayist (1964–2017)

- Born: Rebecca Margaret Swift; 10 January 1964; Highbury, London, England
- Died: 18 April 2017 (aged 53)
- Other name: Becky Swift
- Education: Camden School for Girls; New College, Oxford
- Occupations: Poet and essayist
- Known for: Co-founder of The Literary Consultancy
- Parent(s): Clive Swift; Margaret Drabble
- Relatives: Adam Swift (brother); Joe Swift (brother); David Swift (uncle); A. S. Byatt (aunt)

Rebecca Swift (10 January 1964 – 18 April 2017) was a British poet and essayist. She was co-founder in 1996 of The Literary Consultancy.

== Biography ==
Rebecca Margaret Swift was born in Highbury, north London, the daughter of Clive Swift and Margaret Drabble. Her brothers are Adam Swift and Joe Swift.

As a student, Swift attended the Camden School for Girls and New College, Oxford.

From 1989 to 1995, she worked as a junior editor at Virago Press. She was made redundant after Virago was purchased by Little, Brown and Company. In 1992 and 1995, she published Letters from Margaret: The Fascinating Story of Two Babies Swapped at Birth, and Imagining Characters, respectively. She co-founded The Literary Consultancy, an editing company, in 1996 with Hannah Griffiths. The Literary Consultancy has helped many writers, including Prue Leith, Neamat Imam, and Jennifer Makumbi. In 2009, The Literary Consultancy became a founding member of the Free Word Centre.

In 1999, Swift wrote "Are You Reading Me?" for her master's thesis at the Tavistock Clinic. In 2001, she organised a bursary scheme to provide free editing services to low-income writers. In 2011, she published Dickinson: Poetic Lives, a biography of Emily Dickinson. In 2012, she organised the first digital conference for writers in the United Kingdom, "Writing in a Digital Age" at the Free Word Centre. The conference discussed the current publishing landscape, including self-publishing.

== Death and legacy ==
Swift died of cancer on 18 April 2017, at the age of 53.

In her honour, the Rebecca Swift Foundation was formed by Aki Schilz, who succeeded Swift as director of TLC, and the foundation is now managed by a Board of Trustees and Project Manager. In June 2018, the foundation announced the Women Poets' Prize, to be awarded biennially to three poets, at the Second Home Poetry Festival. It will also provide support to winning poets, in partnership with affiliated organisations.
