= Aki Schilz =

British writer and editor

Aki Schilz Hon. FRSL
- Born: Osaka, Japan
- Education: University of Oxford (BA); Bath Spa University (MA)
- Occupations: Writer, poet and editor
- Employer: The Literary Consultancy (TLC)

Aki Schilz, Hon. FRSL, is a British writer, poet and editor, who is director of The Literary Consultancy, the UK's first editorial assessment service. She is also the current vice-chair of English PEN.

== Background ==
Born in Osaka, Japan, Schilz moved to the United Kingdom in 1987 and is now resident in London. She holds a BA degree in English and French Literature from the University of Oxford and an MA in Creative Writing with Distinction from Bath Spa University.

Following further studies, she worked in a variety administrative roles—including for the National Health Service, as an advertising copywriter, for a games production company and on a travel website—and then undertook publishing internships with such companies as Granta Books and the Literary Review, as well as being employed as Acquisitions Assistant at Jessica Kingsley Publishers.

As a writer, her poems and short stories have appeared online and in print in many outlets, among them Mslexia, Popshot Magazine, Synaesthesia, Ink, Sweat & Tears, And Other Poems, Mnemoscape, Birdbook: Saltwater and Shore, CHEAP POP, and the 2016 anthology An Unreliable Guide to London.

She co-founded, with Influx Press publisher Kit Caless, the LossLit digital literature project, and she has also been a judge for various literary awards including the Bridport Prize and the Creative Future Writing Awards, as well as a regular participant and speaker at conferences and events, particularly about promoting diversity and inclusivity in the publishing industry.

In 2012, she joined The Literary Consultancy (TLC), the UK's first editorial assessment service, being appointed Editorial Services Manager the following year, and she has been director of the company since the death of its founding director Rebecca Swift in 2017.

In 2018, Schilz set up the Rebecca Swift Foundation, a charity that advances the craft, creativity and wellbeing of women poets.

She is a trustee of Poetry London and is on the advisory board of independent publishing company Penned in the Margins. Since 2021, Schilz has served on the board of English PEN, taking over the role of vice-chair from Claire Armitstead, with Ruth Borthwick as chair.

== Recognition ==
Schilz won the inaugural Visual Verse Prize (2013), supported by Andrew Motion, and the inaugural Bare Fiction Prize for Flash Fiction (2014), judged by Angela Readman. She was a Queen's Ferry Press Finalist (Best Small Fictions), and in 2015 was chosen by Roxane Gay to feature in the Wigleaf Top 50. Schilz has twice featured on the Bookseller 150 list of the most influential people in UK publishing (in 2020 and 2021), for her work campaigning for more equitable cultures within the publishing and creative industries.

In 2023, she was elected an Honorary Fellow of the Royal Society of Literature.
