= Clive Swift =

English actor and songwriter (1936–2019)

- Swift in Doctor Who: "Voyage of the Damned"
- Born: Clive Walter Swift; 9 February 1936; Liverpool, England
- Died: 1 February 2019 (aged 82); Paddington, London, England
- Spouse: Margaret Drabble (m. 1960; div. 1975)
- Children: Adam; Rebecca; Joe
- Relatives: David Swift (brother)

Comedy career
- Years active: 1962–2017
- Medium: Television, film

Clive Walter Swift (9 February 1936 – 1 February 2019) was an English actor and songwriter. A classically trained actor, his stage work included performances with the Royal Shakespeare Company, but he was best known to television viewers for his role as Richard Bucket in the BBC sitcom Keeping Up Appearances. He played many other television and film roles.

== Life and career ==
Swift was born in Liverpool on 9 February 1936, the son of Abram Sampson Swift, who owned a furniture shop in Bootle, and Lily Rebecca, née Greenman. He was educated at Clifton College and Gonville and Caius College, Cambridge reading English literature. He was previously a teacher at LAMDA and the Royal Academy of Dramatic Art. His family was Jewish.

He appeared as Snug in the Royal Shakespeare Company's 1968 film production of A Midsummer Night's Dream as part of a cast that included Diana Rigg, Helen Mirren and Ian Richardson. During the 1970s, he appeared as Doctor Black in two of the BBC's M. R. James adaptations: The Stalls of Barchester and in A Warning to the Curious, as well as the BBC adaptation of The Barchester Chronicles. He is best known for his role on Keeping Up Appearances as Richard Bucket, the long-suffering husband of Hyacinth. Swift made two appearances in Doctor Who, in the 1985 story Revelation of the Daleks and the 2007 Christmas special. Around the time of his second appearance, he gave a "grumpy" interview to Doctor Who Magazine in which he bemoaned "not getting paid" to promote his episode, and belittled the show. He also played Sir Ector, the adoptive father of King Arthur in John Boorman's 1981 film Excalibur.

In addition to acting, he was a songwriter. Many of his songs were included in his shows Richard Bucket Overflows: An Audience with Clive Swift, which toured the UK in 2007, and Clive Swift Entertains, in which he performed his own music and lyrics, which toured the UK in 2009. He also played the part of the Reverend Eustacius Brewer in Born and Bred, which aired on BBC One from 2002 to 2005. His last performance was in an episode of Midsomer Murders in 2017, after which he retired.

== Personal life and death ==
Swift was married to novelist Margaret Drabble from 1960 until their divorce in 1975. He was the father of one daughter, Rebecca (who died in April 2017), known for running The Literary Consultancy in London, and two sons, Adam Swift, an academic, and Joe Swift, a garden designer, journalist and television presenter. Swift's elder brother, David, was also an actor.

Swift died at home on 1 February 2019, at the age of 82. Paying tribute to Swift, fellow actor James Dreyfus said he "loved this extremely talented, subtle actor". His Keeping Up Appearances co-star Patricia Routledge said: "Clive was a skillful and inventive actor with wide experience, as his successful career proved", and that she was very sad to hear of her former co-star's death.

== Filmography ==
=== Film ===
Year	Title	Role	Notes
1961	Johnny Nobody	Courtroom Official	Uncredited role
1965	Catch Us If You Can	Duffie	
1968	A Midsummer Night's Dream	Snug	
1972	Frenzy	Johnny Porter	
1972	Death Line	Inspector Richardson	
1973	The National Health	Ash	
1973	Man at the Top	Massey	
1978	The Sailor's Return	Reverend Pottock	
1981	Excalibur	Ector	
1984	Memed My Hawk	Magistrate	
1984	A Passage to India	Major Callendar	
1988	Young Toscanini	Comparsa	Uncredited role
1990	Othello	Brabantio	DVD, re-released 2004
1997	Gaston's War	General James	
2003	Vacuums	AJ Johnson	AKA: Stealing Bess (video title)

=== Television ===
Year	Title	Role	Notes
1961	Theatre Night	The King	Episode: "Ondine"
1963	Love Story	Mervyn	Series 1; episode 11: "Dome Grist from Mervyn's Mill"
1963	Compact	Mr. Perrett	Episode 172: "On the Run"
1965	Knock on Any Door	Arkwright	Series 1; episode 2: "The Knife"
1966	Armchair Theatre	The Camp Doctor	Series 6; episode 4: "The Sweet War Man"
1966	Public Eye	West	Series 2; episode 11: "There Are More Things in Heaven and Earth"
1968	All's Well That Ends Well	Captain Parolles, a follower of Bertram	Television film
1968	The Expert	Graham Richards	Series 1; episode 10: "He's Good for It"
1969	Dombey and Son	Major Bagstock	Mini-series; 7 episodes
1969	Canterbury Tales	The Pardoner's Tale First Rioter	Episode 4: "The Friar's Tale / The Pardoner's Tale"
1969	The Wednesday Play	Neil	Series 8; episode 18: "Birthday"
1970	The Wednesday Play	Adjutant	Series 9; episode 16: "Mad Jack"
1970	Ryan International	Inspector Jenet	Episode 6: "Evidence of Murder"
1970	ITV Sunday Night Theatre	Max Fielder	Series 3; episode 5: "Roll on Four O'Clock"
1970–1971	Thirty-Minute Theatre	Inspector Waugh	Series 6 (Waugh on Crime); episodes 8–13
1971	The Misfit	Gerald	Series 2; episode 5: "On the New Establishment"
1971	A Ghost Story for Christmas	Dr. Black	Series 1; episode 1: "The Stalls of Barchester"
1972	The Liver Birds	Jim Royle	Series 3; episode 4: "Birds on Strike"
1972	Villains	Mr. Clough	Episode 5: "Alice Sheree"
1972	Dead of Night	Dan	Episode 1: "The Exorcism"
1972	A Ghost Story for Christmas	Dr. Black	Series 2; episode 1: "A Warning to the Curious"
1973	The Moon Shines Bright on Charlie Chaplin	Captain	Television film
1973	The Pearcross Girls	Frank Pledger	Episode 1: "Sweet Julia"
1973	The Frighteners	James Machen	Episode 11: "The Classroom"
1974	South Riding	Alfred E. Higgins	Mini-series; 9 episodes
1975	BBC2 Playhouse	Robbie	Series 2; episode 1: "The Breakthrough"
1975	Whodunnit?	Commander Blade	Series 3; episode 7: "Too Many Cooks"
1975	Willow Cabins	Matthew	Television film
1975	Play for Today	Savory	Series 5; episode 14: "Goodbye"
1976	Play for Today	Air Steward	Series 7; episode 7: "Buffet"
1976	The Brothers	Griffith Trevelyan	Series 6; episodes 6 & 7: "Tender" & "The Mole"
1976	Goodbye America	Lord North, the Prime Minister	Television film
1976	Clayhanger	Albert Benbow	Recurring role. 10 episodes
1976	Romeo and Juliet	Friar Lawrence	Television film. Also shown across 8 episodes of The English Programme in 1978
1976	Victorian Scandals	William Hepworth-Dixon	Episode 7: "Beloved"
1976	Beasts	'Bunny' Nettleton	Mini-series; episode 6: "The Dummy"
1977	The Game	Edmund Whitworth	Television film
1977	BBC2 Play of the Week	Frank	Series 1; episode 7: "The Kitchen"
1978	BBC2 Play of the Week	Adamson	Series 1; episode 12: "Foreign Affairs"
1978	1990	Tony Doran	Series 2; episodes 1, 2 & 4
1978	Jackanory Playhouse	Professor Marvel	Series 6; episode 4: "Big Pete, Little Pete"
1978	Send in the Girls	Mr. Fenton	Episode 7: "Goosepimples"
1978	Shadows	Devine	Series 3; episode 3: "And Now for My Next Trick..."
1978	Bless Me, Father	Fred Dobie	Series 1; episode 5: "Father and Mother"
1978	A Horseman Riding By	Watkins	Episode 6: "1905: The Hollow Victory"
1979	Hazell	Neville Fitch	Series 2; episode 1: "Hazell and the Baker Street Sleuth"
1979	A Family Affair	Sir Charles Byford	Mini-series; episode 10: "Finding the Words..."
1979	The First Part of King Henry the Forth	Thomas Percy, Earl of Worcester	Television film
1979	BBC2 Playhouse	Alec Thorne	Series 6; episode 5: "Home Movies"
1980	BBC2 Playhouse	Director of Austrian State Radio	Series 6; episode 25: "An Ordered Life"
1980	The Nesbitts Are Coming	Ernie Nesbitt	Episodes 1–6
1980	Cribb	Dr. Probert	Series 1; episode 8: "A Case of Spirits"
1980	Dr. Jekyll and Mr. Hyde	Hastie Lanyon	Television film
1981	BBC2 Playhouse	Aaron Green	Series 7; episode 18: "The Potsdam Quartet"
1981	Winston Churchill: The Wilderness Years	Sir Horace Wilson	Mini-series; episodes 7 & 8
1982	Tales of the Unexpected	Latham	Series 5; episode 5 "Stranger in Town"
1982	The Gentle Touch	Dalziel	Series 4; episode 1: "Right of Entry"
1982	Praying Mantis	Dr. Faure	Television film
1982	The Further Adventures of Lucky Jim	Lord Davenport	Episode 5: "Eckersley Revisited"
1982	The Barchester Chronicles	Dr. Proudie	Mini-series; episodes 3–7
1983	Martin Luther, Heretic	Johann Tetzel	Television films
1983	Events in a Museum	Mr. Sloane	Television films
1984	Pericles, Prince of Tyre	Lord Cerimon	Television films
1985	The Pickwick Papers	Tracy Tupman	Episodes 1–12
1985	Doctor Who	Professor Jobel	Series 22; episodes 12 & 13: "Revelation of the Daleks: Parts 1 & 2"
1985	Black Silk	Oliver Hollingsworth	Episode 3: "Barrister on Trial"
1985	What Mad Pursuit?	Bonwit Steinhauser	Television film
1986	ScreenPlay	James	Series 1; episode 1: "All Together Now"
1986	First Among Equals	Alec Pimkin	Mini-series; episodes 1–10
1987	Pack of Lies	Ellis	Television film
1987	Inspector Morse	Dr. Bartlett	Series 1; episode 2: "The Silent World of Nicholas Quinn"
1987	Cause célèbre	R.P. Croom Johnson K.C.	Television film
1988	A Very Peculiar Practice	Prof. Piers Platt	Series 2; episode 2: "Art and Illusion"
1988	The Ray Bradbury Theater	St. John Court	Season 2; episode 9: "The Coffin"
1988	Les Girls	Mr. Tobler	Episode 2: "Spanners"
1988	Double First	Mr. Swift	Episodes 3 & 4
1988	Minder	Chisholm's Director	Series 7; episode: "An Officer and a Car Salesman"
1988	Journey's End	Captain Hardy	Television film
1989	Laura and Disorder	Barry Page	Episode 6: "The Metal Detector"
1989	Storyboard	Hewes	Series 4; episode 4: "Hunted Down"
1989	Gentlemen and Players	Sammy	Series 2; episode 6: "Another Square Mile"
1989	Hard Cases	Judge	Series 2; episode 5
1989	British Telecom	Cyril (Beatie's brother-in-law in Australia)	Television advertisement
1990	The Return of Shelley	Robson	Series 2; episode 12: "A Problem Aired"
1990	Theatre Night	Brabantio / Gratiano	Series 5; episode 1: "Othello"
1990	This Is David Harper	Parapope Joshua	Episode 6: "Born Again Testerday"
1990–1995	Keeping Up Appearances	Richard Bucket	Main role. Series 1–5; 44 episodes
1991	The War That Never Ends	Athenagoras	Television film
1992	Boon	Charles Hastings	Series 7; episode 2: "Queen's Gambit"
1993	Noel's House Party	Richard Bucket	Series 3; episode 2
1993	Heartbeat	Victor Kellerman	Series 3; episode 4: "Going Home"
1994	Woof!	Alex Pardoe	Series 7; episode 3: "Doggy Business"
1997	The Famous Five	Mr. Pottersham	Series 2; episodes 7 & 8: "Five Have a Wonderful Time: Parts 1 & 2"
1997	The Memoirs of Hyacinth Bucket	Richard Bucket	Television film (archive footage only)
1998	Peak Practice	Norman Shorthose	Recurring role. Series 6; 10 episodes
1999	Aristocrats	King George II	Mini-series; episodes 1–3
2002	Young Arthur	Illtud	Television film. Pilot for cancelled series
2002–2005	Born and Bred	Reverend Eustacius Brewer	Series 1–4; 36 episodes
2007	Doctor Who	Mr. Copper	Series 4; Christmas Special episode: "Voyage of the Damned"
2008	Keeping Up Appearances: Life Lessons from Onslow	Richard Bucket	Television film (archive footage only)
2009–2010	The Old Guys	Roy	Series 1 & 2; 12 episodes
2010	Little Crackers	Real Father Christmas	Series 1; episode 2: "Chris O'Dowd's Little Cracker: Capturing Santa"
2011	Hustle	Yusef	Series 7; episode 6: "The Delivery"
2014	Cuckoo	Dr. Rafferty	Series 2; episode 4: "Funeral"
2015	Rosamunde Pilcher	Edward Whiteley	Episode: "Valentine's Kiss"
2015	SunTrap	Colin	Episode 2: "In the Line of Fire"
2017	Midsomer Murders	Felix Hope	Series 19; episode 2: "Crime and Punishment" (final appearance)

== Radio ==
- "Vivat Rex" as Lord Talbot in "Henry VI" by William Shakespeare, in episodes 15–16, BBC (1977)
- Souvenirs of Chabrier - five-part series on the life and music of Emmanuel Chabrier, with Swift as the composer (1981)
- Measure for Measure as Escalus (2004)
- Oblomov as the Doctor (2005)
- The Right Time (2008)
- Jorrocks's Jaunts and Jollities as Nash (2011)
- The Price of Fear – Remains to be Seen as Fred Treiber (2012)

== Stage ==
- Cymbeline (1962) as Cloten
- The Physicists (1963) as Inspector Richard Voss (Aldwych Theatre)
- The Tempest (1966) as Caliban (Prospect Theatre Company)
