= Joe Swift =

British television presenter (b. 1965)

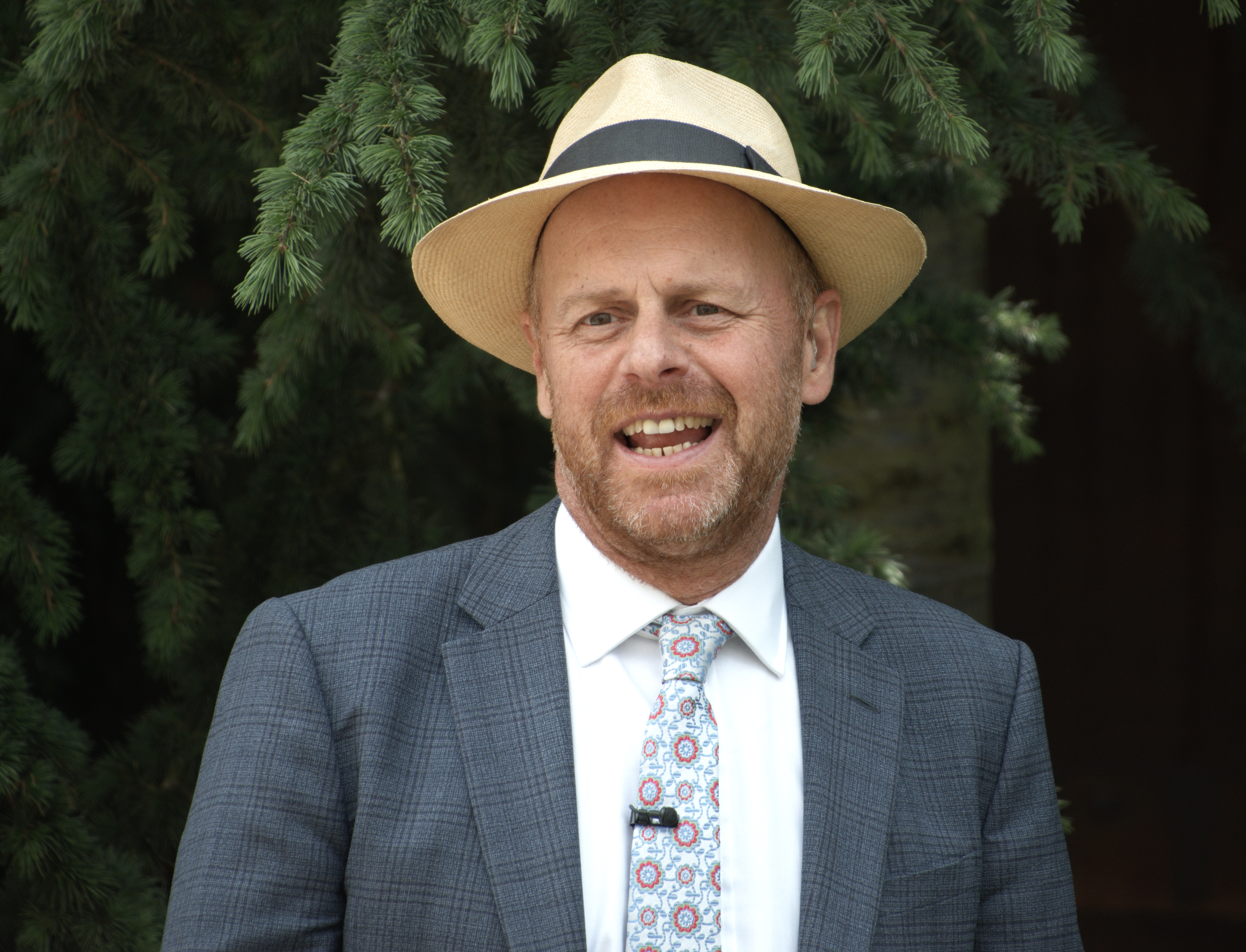
- Swift in 2019
- Born: Joseph Samuel Swift; 25 May 1965 (age 61); Newcastle, England, UK
- Occupations: Broadcaster, gardener
- Parent(s): Clive Swift; Margaret Drabble
- Relatives: Adam Swift (brother); Rebecca Swift (sister); David Swift (uncle); A. S. Byatt (aunt)
- Website: www.joeswift.co.uk

Joseph Samuel Swift (born 25 May 1965) is an English garden designer and television presenter.

== Television career ==
Swift is a regular presenter and designer on the BBC's Gardeners' World, co-presenter on the Royal Horticultural Society Chelsea Flower Show, Gardeners' World Live, Hampton Court, RHS Tatton Park Flower Show, BBC's Small Town Gardens, and design judge on BBC's Gardener of the Year. He has been a presenter/designer on Take 3 Gardeners (with Cleve West and Ann-Marie Powell).

He is a garden designer, and has been involved in BBC2's Gardeners' World since 1998. He is co-founder and Design Director of Modular Garden – a garden design and build company. Swift has designed many gardens on TV, including one for Comic Relief, many for Gardeners' World, including the Bournville Garden, The 40-year garden, and for Alan Titchmarsh's How to be a Gardener series.

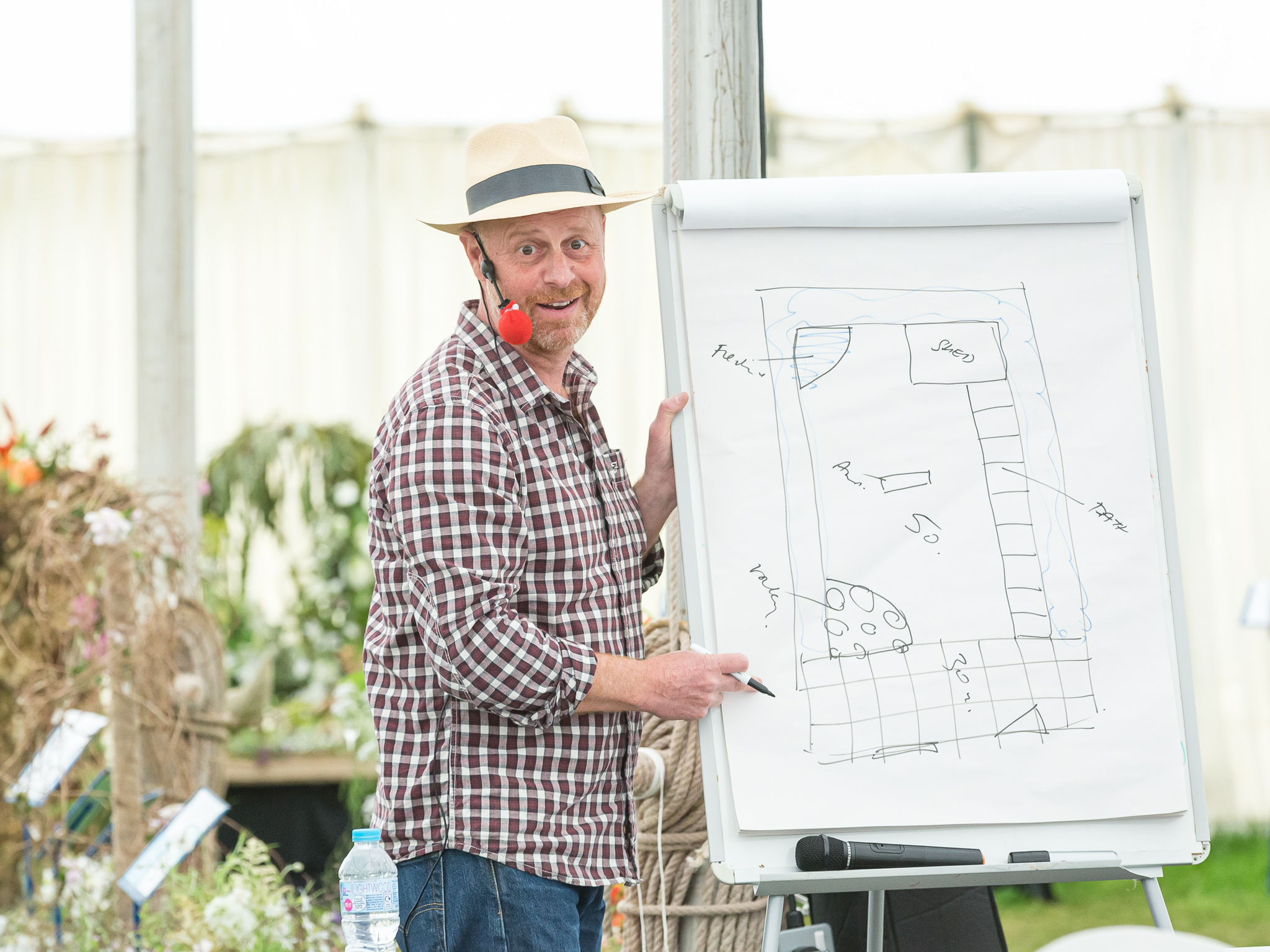
Joe Swift presenting at the Craft and Garden Pavilion at the Devon County Show in 2023

In 2009 Swift presented coverage of the Hampton Court Palace Flower Show for the BBC. He was also one of the main presenters of the BBC coverage of the 2010 Chelsea Flower Show. In 2013, he presented two episodes of Great British Garden Revival.

== Writing ==
Swift has written for such newspapers as The Independent, The Evening Standard, and The Sunday Times, on the subject of landscaping and home gardening. He has written three books – The Plant Room, Joe's Urban Garden Handbook, and Joe’s Allotment, published in April 2009.

== Personal life ==
Swift's father was the actor Clive Swift, and he is the nephew of David Swift. His mother is novelist Margaret Drabble, and his brother is academic Adam Swift. His sister Rebecca Swift (died April 2017) was a poet and founder of The Literary Consultancy. He is married with two children.

He is the design director of Modular Garden.

== Bibliography ==
- Swift, Joe (2001). The Plant Room. A Contemporary Guide to Urban Gardening. BBC Books. ISBN 0563551895.
- Swift, Joe (2008). Joe's Urban Garden Handbook. Quadrille. ISBN 9781844008377.
- Swift, Joe (2 April 2009). Joe's Allotment. BBC Books. ISBN 978-1-84607-672-5.
