= Ackerley Prize =

Annual award for autobiographies of literary excellence

The TLS Ackerley Prize is awarded annually to a literary autobiography of excellence, written by an author of British nationality and published during the preceding year. The winner receives £4,000.

The prize was established by Nancy West, née Ackerley, sister of English author and editor J. R. Ackerley. It was first awarded in 1982.

The prize is judged by the trustees of the J. R. Ackerley Trust; biographer and historian Peter Parker (Chair), the biographer and critic Claire Harman, and the writer and editor Michael Caines. There is no formal submission process for the award — judges simply "call in" books to be added to their longlist.

Former judges include the novelist Francis King, the biographer Michael Holroyd, the editor of Ackerley's letters, Neville Braybrooke, food writer and historian Colin Spencer, the biographer and historian Richard Davenport-Hines and the novelist and short story writer Georgina Hammick.

In 2023, the Prize's long partnership with English PEN, when it was known as the PEN Ackerley Prize, came to an end. The award reverted to its original name of the Ackerley Prize.

In 2024, the Prize formed a partnership with the Times Literary Supplement and was renamed the TLS Ackerley Prize.

== Recipients ==
- 1982: Edward Blishen, Shaky Relations
- 1983: Joint winners:
  - Kathleen Dayus, Her People
  - Ted Walker, High Path
- 1984: Richard Cobb, Still Life
- 1985: Angelica Garnett, Deceived with Kindness
- 1986: Dan Jacobson, Time and Time Again
- 1987: Diana Athill, After the Funeral
- 1988: Anthony Burgess, Little Wilson and Big God
- 1989: John Healy, The Grass Arena
- 1990: Germaine Greer, Daddy We Hardly Knew You
- 1991: Paul Binding, St Martin's Ride
- 1992: John Osborne, Almost a Gentleman
- 1993: Barry Humphries, More, Please
- 1994: Blake Morrison, When Did You Last See Your Father?
- 1995: Paul Vaughan, Something in Linoleum
- 1996: Eric Lomax, The Railway Man
- 1997: Tim Lott, The Scent of Dried Roses
- 1998: Katrin Fitzherbert, True to Both Myselves
- 1999: Margaret Forster, Precious Lives
- 2000: Mark Frankland, Child of My Time
- 2001: Lorna Sage, Bad Blood
- 2002: Michael Foss, Out of India: A Raj Childhood
- 2003: Jenny Diski, Stranger on a Train
- 2004: Bryan Magee, Clouds of Glory: A Hoxton Childhood
- 2005: Jonathan Gathorne-Hardy, Half an Arch
- 2006: Alan Bennett, Untold Stories
- 2007: Brian Thompson, Keeping Mum
- 2008: Miranda Seymour, In My Father's House
- 2009: Julia Blackburn, The Three of Us
- 2010: Gabriel Weston, Direct Red: A Surgeon's View of Her Life-or-Death Profession
- 2011: Michael Frayn, My Father's Fortune
- 2012: Duncan Fallowell, How to Disappear
- 2013: Richard Holloway, Leaving Alexandria: A Memoir of Faith and Doubt (Canongate)
- 2014: Sonali Deraniyagala, Wave (Virago)
- 2015: Henry Marsh, Do No Harm: Stories of Life, Death and Brain Surgery (Weidenfeld & Nicolson)
- 2016: Alice Jolly, Dead Babies and Seaside Towns
- 2017: Amy Liptrot, The Outrun (Canongate)
- 2018: Richard Beard, The Day That Went Missing (Harvill Secker)
- 2019: Yrsa Daley-Ward, The Terrible (Penguin)
- 2020: Alison Light, A Radical Romance: A Memoir of Love, Grief and Consolation (Fig Tree)
- 2021: Claire Wilcox, Patch Work: A Life Amongst Clothes (Bloomsbury)
- 2022: Frances Stonor Saunders, The Suitcase: Six Attempts to Cross a Border (Jonathan Cape)
- 2023: Nancy Campbell, Thunderstone: Finding Shelter From the Storm (Elliott & Thompson)
- 2024: Catherine Taylor, The Stirrings: A Memoir in Northern Time (Weidenfeld & Nicolson)
- 2025: Jeff Young, Wild Twin: Dream Maps of a Lost Soul and Drifter.
