= The Leper's Companions =

1999 novel by Julia Blackburn

- Author: Julia Blackburn
- Language: English
- Publisher: Pantheon Books
- Publication date: 1999
- Publication place: United Kingdom
- Pages: 208
- ISBN: 978-0-679-43984-4

The Leper's Companions is a novel by British author Julia Blackburn, published in 1999 by Pantheon Books. The narrative follows a grieving woman who escapes from the present by telling the story of a medieval English village. The book was shortlisted for the 1999 Women's Prize for Fiction.

== Summary ==
An unnamed woman narrates the novel from the modern age. She is bereaved at the start of the novel. In an attempt to escape her emotions, she casts her mind back to the past. She finds herself in a medieval village haunted by various supernatural beings. A wandering leper appears in the village and guides some of the villagers on a pilgrimage to Jerusalem.

== Reception ==
The New York Times said the book had "a remarkable intensity". Publishers Weekly said the novel's plot was "sometimes digressive and difficult to follow" but praised Blackburn's "keen sympathy for her characters and her sensual evocation of medieval life".The National Post offered a mixed review, describing the scenery of the novel as "haunting and beautifully described" but said the story felt incomplete. A review from Kirkus praised the book's vividness, describing it as "difficult, ambitious, demanding—and exquisitely, unendingly, depthlessly beautiful both in matter and manner, to be read not just once". However, the reviewer was critical of the book's simplicity in contrast to The Book of Colour.

== Awards ==
The Leper's Companions was shortlisted for the Women's Prize for Fiction in 1999. This was the second time a Blackburn novel appeared on the shortlist, following the inclusion of The Book of Colour in 1996.
