= The Day That Went Missing =

2017 memoir by Richard Beard

The Day That Went Missing: A Family's Story
- Author: Richard Beard
- Language: English
- Genre: Memoir
- Publisher: Harvill Secker
- Publication date: April 6, 2017
- Media type: Hardcover
- Pages: 288
- ISBN: 978-1-910701-56-0
- OCLC: 1028521670
- Dewey Decimal: 155.937/092
- LC Class: BF575.G7 B4127 2017

The Day That Went Missing: A Family's Story is a memoir written by English author Richard Beard about a family tragedy that occurred when he was a boy and the collective denial perpetrated by his entire family in its wake.

The book was published in the United Kingdom in April 2017 by Harvill Secker, and in the United States in November 2018 by Little, Brown and Company. It won Beard the 2018 PEN/Ackerley prize for a literary biography of excellence, and was also named a finalist for several other noted literary prizes including the National Book Critics Circle Award.

== Synopsis ==
The book begins with the author at age eleven in 1978, swimming in the sea off Cornwall, England, with his nine-year-old brother, Nicky. Out of sight of their parents and siblings, they suddenly find themselves dragged into an undertow and are quickly out of their depth. Richard realizes that he is about to die and struggles frantically to shore, leaving Nicky behind. His last view of his brother is of the younger boy straining to keep his head above water and whimpering. Although Richard runs for help, it is too late by the time a rescue boat arrives. Nicky has drowned.

Nearly forty years later, Richard is disturbed by what he perceives as his own inability to feel things deeply. He decides to perform an 'inquest' into his brother's death, believing it to be key to why he represses his emotions. He interviews his mother and two surviving brothers, Tim and Jem, as well as one of the men who crewed the lifeboat that pulled Nicky's body from the sea. He visits his brother's grave for the first time and locates the beach where it happened, forcing himself to revisit the scene.

He is shocked when his mother tells him something that he, Tim and Jem have all erased from their memories: immediately after their parents returned from Nicky's funeral (which the boys were not permitted to attend) in their hometown of Swindon, the family drove straight back to the same vacation house they had been renting in Cornwall to spend another week. "We had it booked", his mother explains. They resumed their holiday without speaking of what had happened, even returning to the very same beach where Nicky had died only days earlier, to picnic. He and his older brother were sent back to boarding school when fall term began a few weeks later, and there again, no one spoke of Nicky, who had also been a student at the school. Richard interviews the school's headmaster, who tells him that during his first months back, he repeatedly woke screaming in the night.

Beard's father never spoke of Nicky to anyone again, and his mother said her dead son's name only a few times over the years. Real memories of Nicky have been lost; his own mother remembers him as a poor student who was hopeless at sports, but Richard uncovers his school reports and learns that Nicky had in fact been a star pupil and athlete.

When he finds a notebook in which Nicky had written judgments of each of his three brothers, Richard is forced to confront the fact that he had not really gotten along with the talented younger brother he feared was catching up to him and threatening his place in the family. Along the way, he reveals a deep resentment toward his father, who died in 2011 but had cancer that summer in 1978 and had not been expected to survive. He is angry with the older man for having sent each of his sons away at the age of eight to live at boarding school, where they had to shut down their feelings of homesick abandonment in order to both avoid being bullied and be judged a success; for being the prime agent of repression who kept the family from speaking about Nicky; and above all, for not jumping into the sea and trying to save his son that terrible day in Cornwall, when he seemingly had so little to lose.

== Awards and honors ==
In the U.K., The Day That Went Missing was awarded the 2018 PEN Ackerley Prize for a literary biography of excellence. It was also shortlisted for both the 2017 Rathbones Folio Prize and the James Tait Black Memorial Prize.

In the U.S., it was named a finalist in the autobiography category for the 2018 National Book Critics Circle Award.

== Critical reception ==
The Day That Went Missing received favorable reviews from literary critics during both the 2017 U.K. and 2018 U.S. releases.

Andrew Holgate, writing in The Sunday Times, called it "a memoir of real truth and heartbreaking emotional heft.” Novelist Nicholas Shakespeare reviewed it for The Spectator and described it as "A monument to the power of literature...a wonderful memoir but also a salvage operation in which he writes himself back into life." The Scotsman literary critic Stuart Kelly said it was "a book of consistent astonishments...Beard is one of our most accomplished authors."

The reviews for the 2018 U.S. release were similarly positive: Laurie Hertzel wrote in the Minneapolis Star Tribune: "Beard’s book has all the required elements of a great memoir—a compelling story, deep introspection, fine writing and an unflinching quest for factual and emotional truth. This haunting book is a profoundly moving study of memory, denial and grief." Publishers Weekly described it as "stunning...His beautifully written story is heartbreaking and unforgettable", and Kirkus Reviews said of it: "Meticulously crafted and searingly honest, Beard’s narrative is at once a story about the long and difficult road to self-forgiveness and a commentary on the wages of British emotional repression."

== Related writing ==
To coincide with the April 2017 UK release of The Day That Went Missing, Beard penned two articles for the newspaper The Guardian.

In the first, he wrote about rediscovering, after years of repressing any thoughts of his younger brother, the contentious relationship the two of them had shared. Reading Nicky's laudatory school reports for research:

"I realised, or remembered, that on the far side of the wall we had been rivals...His growing up endangered my status. Bluntly, at that stage in our lives, we didn’t like each other, and then he died...Stubborn little bastard, yes, I remember that now. 'He holds his own and does well to compete with others who are often physically much larger than he is.' Like an older brother, for example. Wiry, indefatigable, he just kept coming...Fuck off, Nicky, I miss you more than I ever said."

He concluded the article by writing:

"Nicky’s forcefully lived life, however brief, refused to stay repressed. He gave 100% and was never satisfied. Everybody said so, and a boy like that was always going to make it back. He took his time, and death delayed him, but eventually he caught me up."

In the second article, Beard discussed the impact that writing the book had on him and his family after decades of not speaking about Nicky:

"The trouble with denial is that it’s not a precision tool. All those years ago, we closed our eyes against Nicky’s death. But in resisting grief we shut out other stuff too, like the joy Nicky brought us and the characteristics that made him an individual human being...It was worth toughing out the doubts to discover that a book could bring my immediate family closer. I speak more often to my brothers and the response of my children reassures me that emotional dumbness needn’t pass glumly from one generation to the next. Mum sends me frequent postcards, dotted with exclamation marks, to say that at last she feels a weight has been lifted, though she also laments the waste of time, our long, ungiving silence."
