= Adam Swift =

British political philosopher and sociologist

- Born: 1961 (age 64–65)
- Education: Balliol College, Oxford; Nuffield College, Oxford
- Occupations: Political philosopher and sociologist
- Parent(s): Clive Swift; Margaret Drabble
- Relatives: Rebecca Swift (sister); Joe Swift (brother); David Swift (uncle); A. S. Byatt (aunt)
- Website: www.adamswift.uk

Adam Swift (born 1961) is a British political philosopher and sociologist who is professor at University College London. He has published books on liberalism and communitarianism, on social class, social mobility and social justice, on the philosophical aspects of school choice, on the ethics of the family, on how to make education policy, and on the regulation of religious schools, as well as an introduction to contemporary political philosophy.

== Family and education ==
Swift's father was the actor Clive Swift and he is the nephew of David Swift. His mother is the novelist Margaret Drabble. He is the brother of the poet and essayist Rebecca Swift and television presenter Joe Swift.

Swift studied PPE at Balliol College, Oxford. He then did an MPhil degree in Sociology at Nuffield College, Oxford, and subsequently became a Fellow of Balliol College. His DPhil thesis was on the topic of "A Sociologically Informed Political Theory".

== Career ==
Swift was the Founding Director of the Oxford Centre for the Study of Social Justice. Since September 2018, he has been Professor of Political Theory in the Department of Political Science at University College London.

Swift writes for both academic and non-academic audiences, and is an occasional contributor to political debates about education.

Swift is a member of Giving What We Can, a community of people who have pledged to give at least 10% of their income to effective charities.

== Books ==
- How To Think About Religious Schools: Principles and Policies (with Matthew Clayton, Andrew Mason and Ruth Wareham) [2024]
- Educational Goods: Values, Evidence and Decision Making (with Harry Brighouse, Helen F. Ladd and Susanna Loeb) (2018)
- Family Values: The Ethics of Parent-Child Relationships (with Harry Brighouse) [2014]
- Political Philosophy: A Beginner’s Guide for Students and Politicians [2001, 4th edition 2019]
- How Not To Be A Hypocrite: School Choice for the Morally Perplexed Parent [2003]
- Against the Odds? Social Class and Social Justice in Industrial Societies (with Gordon Marshall and Stephen Roberts) [1997]
- Liberals and Communitarians (with Stephen Mulhall) [1992, 2nd edition 1996]
