= David Swift (actor) =

English actor (1931–2016)

- Swift as Henry Davenport in Drop the Dead Donkey
- Born: David Bernard Swift; 3 April 1931; Liverpool, England
- Died: 8 April 2016 (aged 85); London, England
- Resting place: Highgate Cemetery
- Occupation: Actor
- Years active: 1961–2004
- Spouse: Paula Jacobs (m. 1953)
- Children: 2
- Relatives: Clive Swift (brother); Adam Swift (nephew); Rebecca Swift (niece); Joe Swift (nephew); David Bamber (son-in-law); Ethan Bamber (grandson)

David Bernard Swift (3 April 1931 – 8 April 2016) was an English actor known for his role as Henry Davenport in the topical comedy Drop the Dead Donkey.

== Early life ==
Swift was born in Liverpool, the second of the four children of Abram Sampson Swift and Lily Rebecca (née Greenman), who owned a furniture shop in Bootle. His family was Jewish. He was educated at Clifton College and Gonville and Caius College, Cambridge, where he studied law. He then embarked on a career as a businessman with his father-in-law, J.P. Jacobs, whose company supplied all the elastic to Marks & Spencer.

== Career ==
Swift made his professional debut on stage after being appointed as an assistant stage manager at Dundee Repertory Theatre in 1963. He made his television debut in 1964 as Theo Clay in the soap opera Compact. He appeared in many small-screen roles in the 1970s and 1980s, whilst in the theatre he appeared in the Royal Shakespeare Company's 1978 production of Henry VI, Part 1 at the Aldwych Theatre, and won acclaim for his performance as Frank Doel in the Ambassadors Theatre's 1981-2 production of 84, Charing Cross Road. In addition he played Montclair in the film of The Day of the Jackal (1973). Swift appeared as Dingley alongside Richard Beckinsale in the BBC situation comedy Bloomers (1979) and also appeared in several episodes of Going Straight (1978), the sequel to Porridge. Prior to this he had made a guest appearance, again with Beckinsale, in the Yorkshire Television comedy Rising Damp in which he played a suicidal tenant in the episode "Good Samaritans". But it was the role of irascible newsreader Henry Davenport in the topical comedy Drop the Dead Donkey, written by Andy Hamilton and Guy Jenkin, for which Swift became best known. He also made occasional appearances as God in the Radio 4 comedy Old Harry's Game, also written by Hamilton.

Alongside his acting career, Swift had an active interest in the behind-the-scenes aspects of media production, running the sound recording and post-production businesses Preview 1 and Preview 2 in the 1960s, before co-founding and managing Tempest Films in 1969, along with film-makers Charles Denton, Richard Marquand, Paul Watson and John Pilger. The company also produced documentaries by actor-director Kenneth Griffith.

== Personal life and death ==
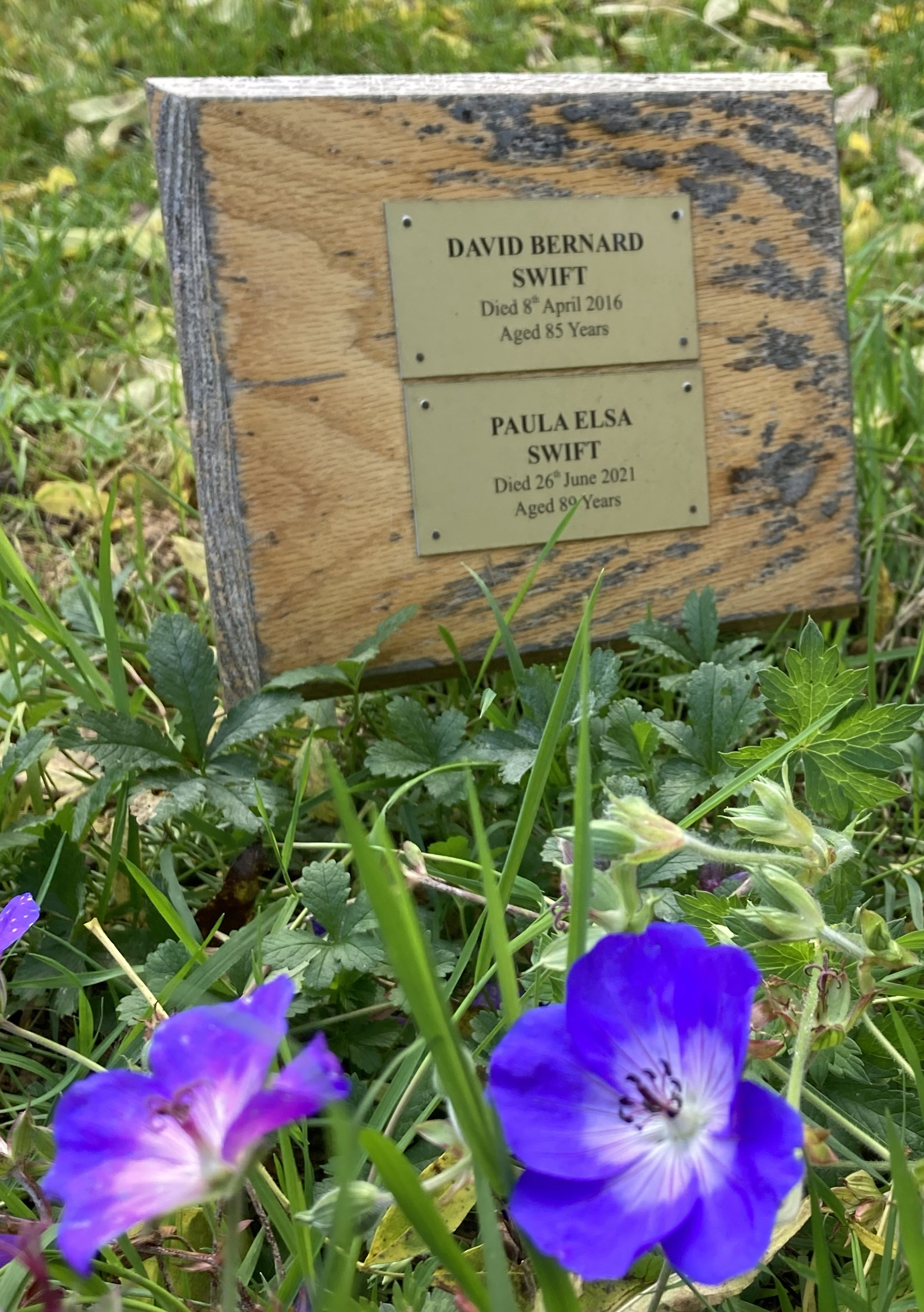
Grave of David Swift and Paula Jacobs in Highgate Cemetery

Swift was the elder brother of the actor Clive Swift, known for his role in Keeping Up Appearances, with whom he sometimes performed. He was the uncle of the academic Adam Swift and the television personality Joe Swift and their sister Rebecca. He was married to the actress Paula Jacobs, was the father of actress Julia Swift and father-in-law of actor David Bamber.

Swift died from complications of Alzheimer's disease on 8 April 2016, at the age of 85.

== Selected filmography ==
=== Film ===
Year	Title	Role	Notes
1972	Travels with My Aunt	Detective	
1973	The Day of the Jackal	Montclair	
1973	No Sex Please, We're British	Paul	
1974	The Internecine Project	Chester Drake	
1977	The Assignment	Zaforteza	
1977	The Black Panther	Detective Chief Superintendent	
1995	Jack & Sarah	Michael	

=== Television ===
Year	Title	Role	Notes
1964	Hamlet at Elsinore	Player King	
1964	Call the Gun Expert	Counsel	Episode: "The Jockey Cap Case - 1927"
1966	The Avengers	Barber	Episode: "What the Butler Saw"
1966	The Baron	Phillipe/Lonnie	2 episodes
1971	Budgie	Sergeant Oxley	Episode: "Could Do Better"
1972	ITV Sunday Night Theatre	Eric Armitstead/Fred	2 episodes, including Another Sunday and Sweet F.A.
1972-1973	War and Peace	Napoleon Bonaparte	9 episodes
1973	Play for Today	Councillor Bass	Episode: "Highway Robbery"
1974	Who Killed Lamb?	Inspector Havelock	TV film
1974	Fall of Eagles	Trepov	Episode: "The Appointment"
1974	Father Brown	Stephen Aylmer	Episode: "The Dagger with Wings"
1976	The New Avengers	Turner	Episode: "The Midas Touch"
1977	Rising Damp	Gray	Episode: "The Good Samaritans"
1978	BBC Television Shakespeare	Duke of Northumberland	Episode: Richard II
1978	Les Misérables	Troufiat	TV film
1978	Going Straight	Mr. McEwan	2 episodes
1979	Bloomers	Dingley	5 episodes
1980	The Professionals	Sir Kenneth	Episode: "Slush Fund"
1980	Turtle's Progress	Superintendent Rafferty	Season 2
1981	The Bunker	Johann Rattenhuber	TV film
1981	The Day of the Triffids	Beadley	Part Three
1981	Winston Churchill: The Wilderness Years	Professor Lindemann	6 episodes
1984	Freud	Joseph Breuer	Miniseries
	Cold Warrior	Sir William Logie	5 episodes
1987	Bergerac	Dr. Barnard	Episode: "The Deadly Virus"
1987	The Storyteller	King	Episode: "Hans my Hedgehog"
1987	Vanity Fair	Mr. Sedley	11 episodes
1988	Jack the Ripper	Lord Salisbury	Miniseries
1989	Agatha Christie's Poirot	Henry Reedburn	Episode: "The King of Clubs"
1989	Countdown to War	Édouard Daladier	TV movie
1990-1998	Drop the Dead Donkey	Henry Davenport	
2002	Holby City	Bill Hoskins	Episode: "Coming Home"
2004	Born and Bred	Euphrates	Episode: "The Doctor Now Departing"

=== Radio ===
- Old Harry's Game
