= Herman Makkink =

Dutch artist (1937–2013)

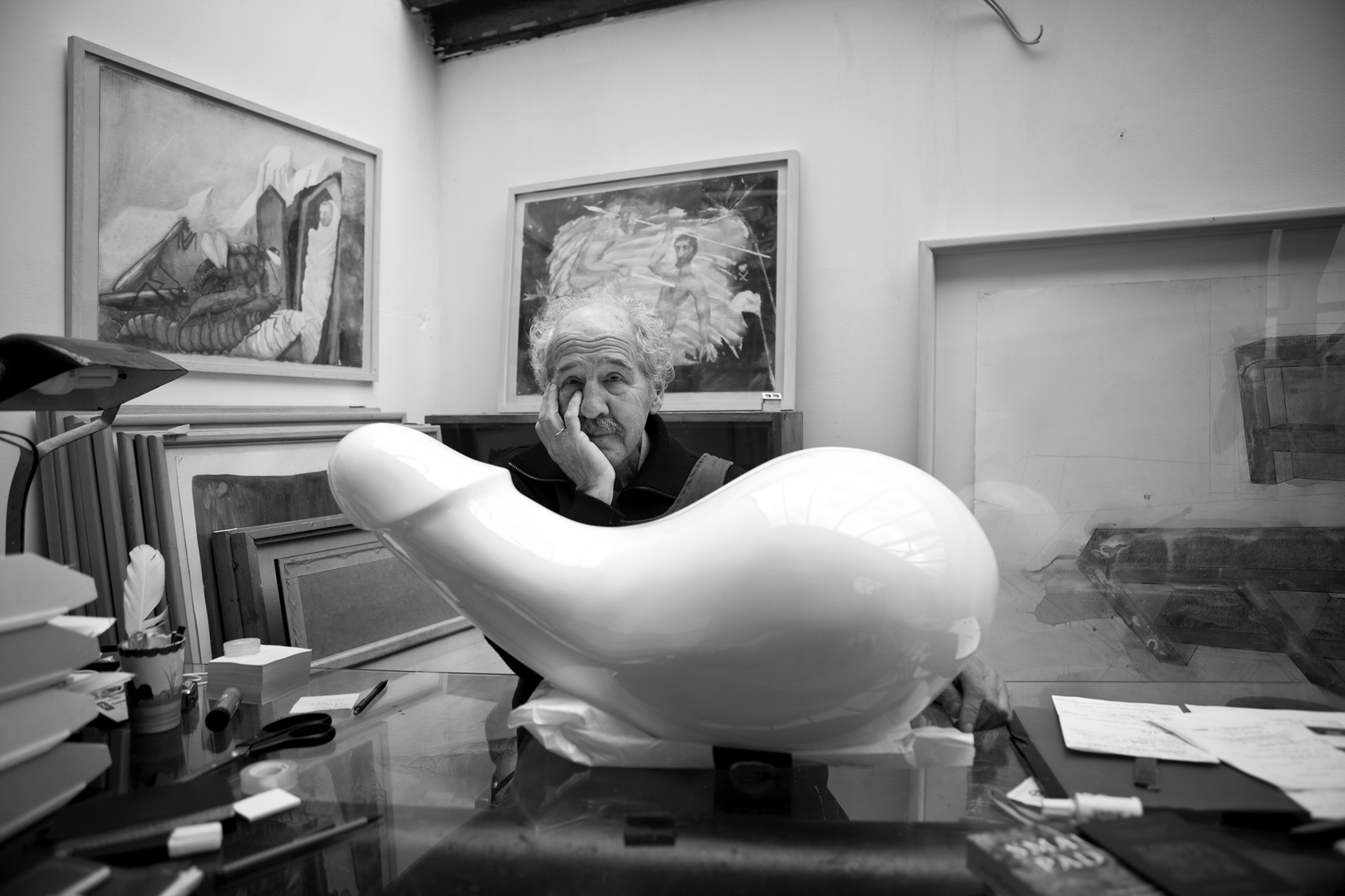
- Makkink and his most famous work, Rocking Machine, featured prominently in Stanley Kubrick's 1971 film A Clockwork Orange
- Born: Herman Makkink; 21 October 1937; Winschoten, Netherlands
- Died: 20 October 2013 (aged 75); Amsterdam, Netherlands
- Known for: Sculpture, graphic art and illustration
- Notable work: Rocking Machine (1969); Butterfly Mill (1993)
- Movement: Pop art, Surrealism
- Spouse: Julia Blackburn
- Patrons: Stanley Kubrick

Herman Makkink (21 October, 1937 – 20 October 2013) was a Dutch sculptor, graphic artist and illustrator.

== Life and work ==
Makkink was born in Winschoten. After studying chemistry from 1955 to 1959 in Groningen, Makkink began to walk and hitchhike around the world, a phase in his life he described in the book Around the World on Foot and which he sold to various newspapers, mainly in Southeast Asia. He worked in Japan as an English teacher and also travelled through Australia and Central America. He began to sculpt in the United States, when he made his first assemblage of scrap metal. After a short stay in Greece, he moved to London, becoming technical assistant at the London College of Printing, and participating in several group exhibitions.

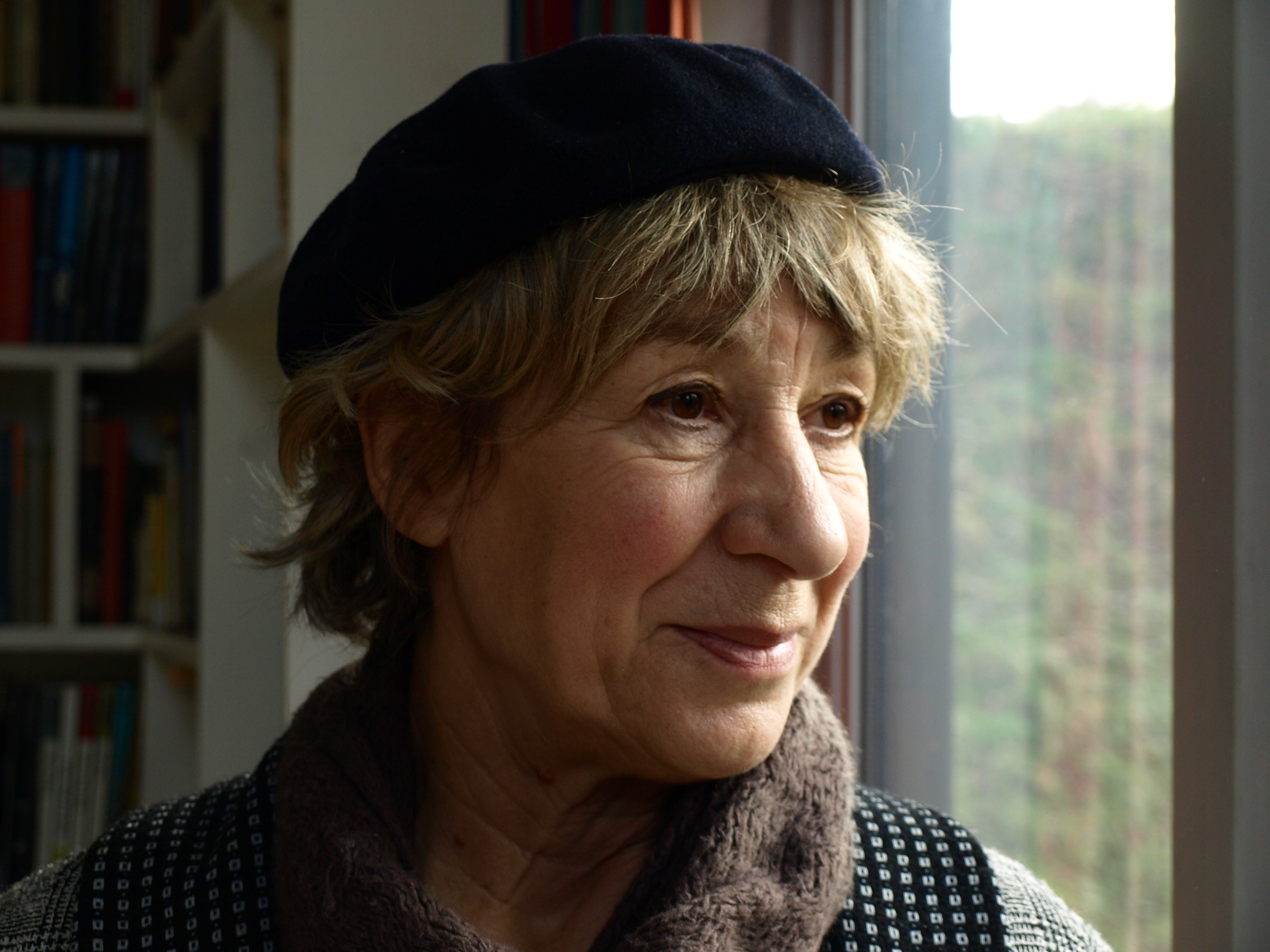
Julia Blackburn photographed by Herman Makkink in 2013

His first solo exhibition, Gnomes, was mounted at the Courtauld Institute of Art in 1971. Makkink worked with his brother Kees Makkink, at the St Katharine Docks complex in London, a former industrial complex that was converted by the SPACE Foundation as a studio complex. There, in 1969, he was discovered by Stanley Kubrick who used two of Makkink's works in his film A Clockwork Orange (1971): Rocking Machine and Christ Unlimited. Coincidentally, Italian filmmaker Tinto Brass also used Rocking Machine in his 1970 film Dropout, starring Vanessa Redgrave.

Makkink's partner was the British author, Julia Blackburn. In 1972, Makkink settled in Amsterdam, while making regular visits to Deià, Majorca. His first solo exhibition in Amsterdam's Wetering Gallery took place in 1982, and the gallery has continued to feature his work ever since. In 1986, he was visiting professor at the ArtEZ Institute of the Arts.

From 1987 to 2000, he taught part-time at the Gerrit Rietveld Academie in Amsterdam. Makkink worked alternately in Bramfield (Suffolk) and the Italian municipality of Molini di Triora, where he met and shared a great friendship with the Italian-Chilean surrealist painter, Mauricio Stella, who lived in Molini di Triora and then in Amsterdam. Makkink shared an Amsterdam studio with his former pupil, Adriaan Rees, for many years until Makkink's death. Makkink was controversial in Amsterdam. One of his sculptures – a tubular shape executed in brick at the Spinozahof – was demolished in 1994 because, according to local residents, it obstructed their view.

He died in Amsterdam on October 20, 2013.

== Notable works ==
The following are commissioned public works in the Netherlands:

- 1986: Four hollow shapes, Detroitdreef, Utrecht
- 1987: Tunnel, Four Wind Avenue, Tilburg
- 1987: Obelisk, Marnixplein, Rotterdam
- 1987: Globe-form Sprengen Park, Apeldoorn – posted 1992
- 1988: Twisted Towers (or Wokkels) Beijrincklaan, Waddinxveen
- Module 1988, Van Dam Isseltweg (Town Hall), Geldermalsen
- 1990: Nine Lean Blocks, Leeghwaterpad (Water District), Almere
- 1990: Disposable Cottage, Cornelis Lely Laan, Amsterdam
- 1990: Stray House II, French Camp Heide, Bussum
- 1991: Planet Breedstraat, Utrecht
- 1993: Butterfly Mill roundabout Anderlechtlaan / Sloterweg, Amsterdam
- 1994: Ellipsoid Purmerland Chaussée (Municipal Office), Purmerend
- 1996: Mondoide, Wassenaarseslag, Wassenaar
- 1996: The Domain of the Swarm, Heteren
- 1987/2001: Old Ground, Mauritskade, Amsterdam
- 1997/2002: Ziggurat, Alphen aan den Rijn
- 2003: Bolbewoners, Westerpark, Amsterdam

== Personal life ==
Makkink was married three times. He was survived by his daughter Fiona, two step-children, and his third wife and companion of several years, Julia Blackburn.

== Gallery ==
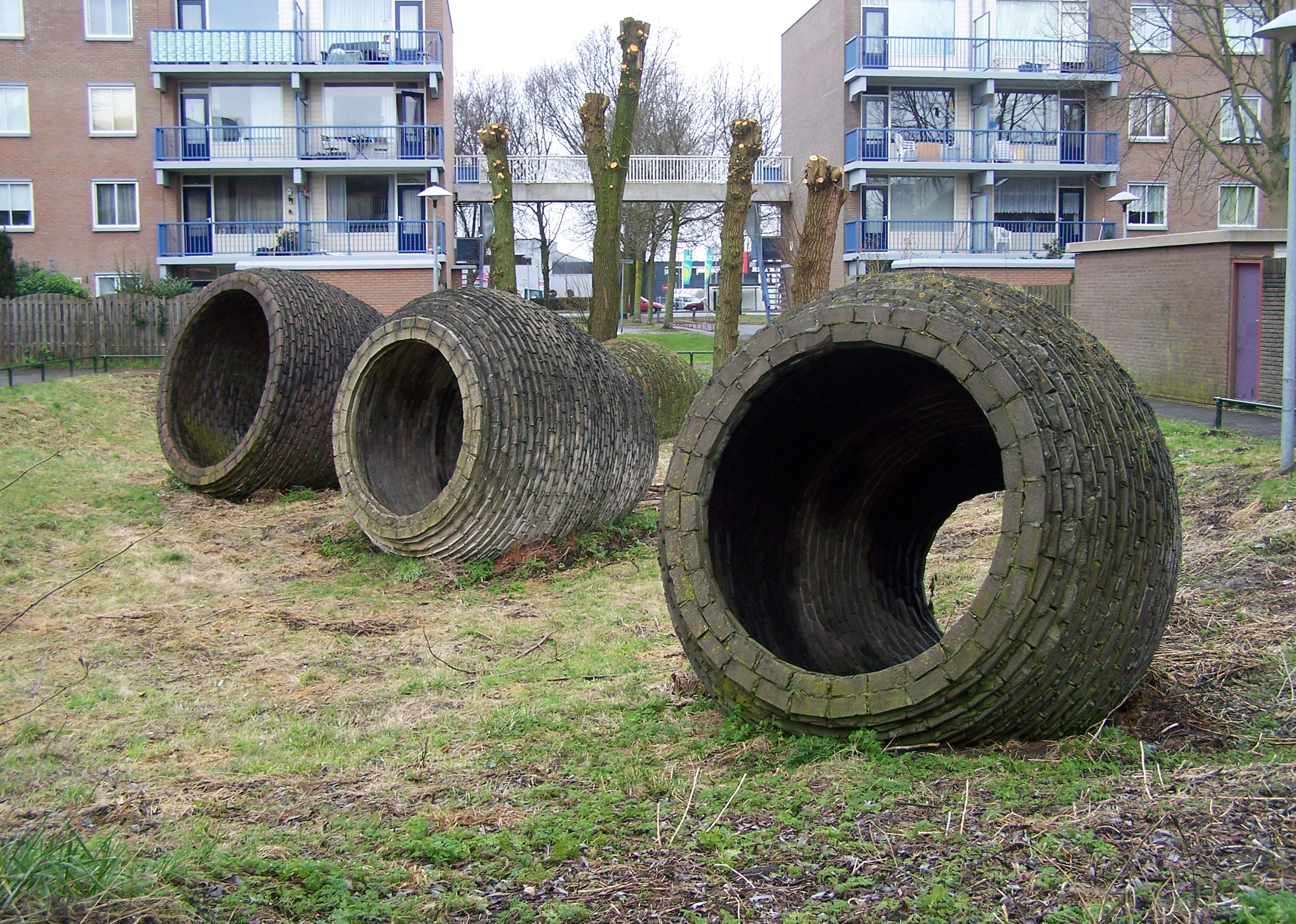
Vier holle vormen (1986)

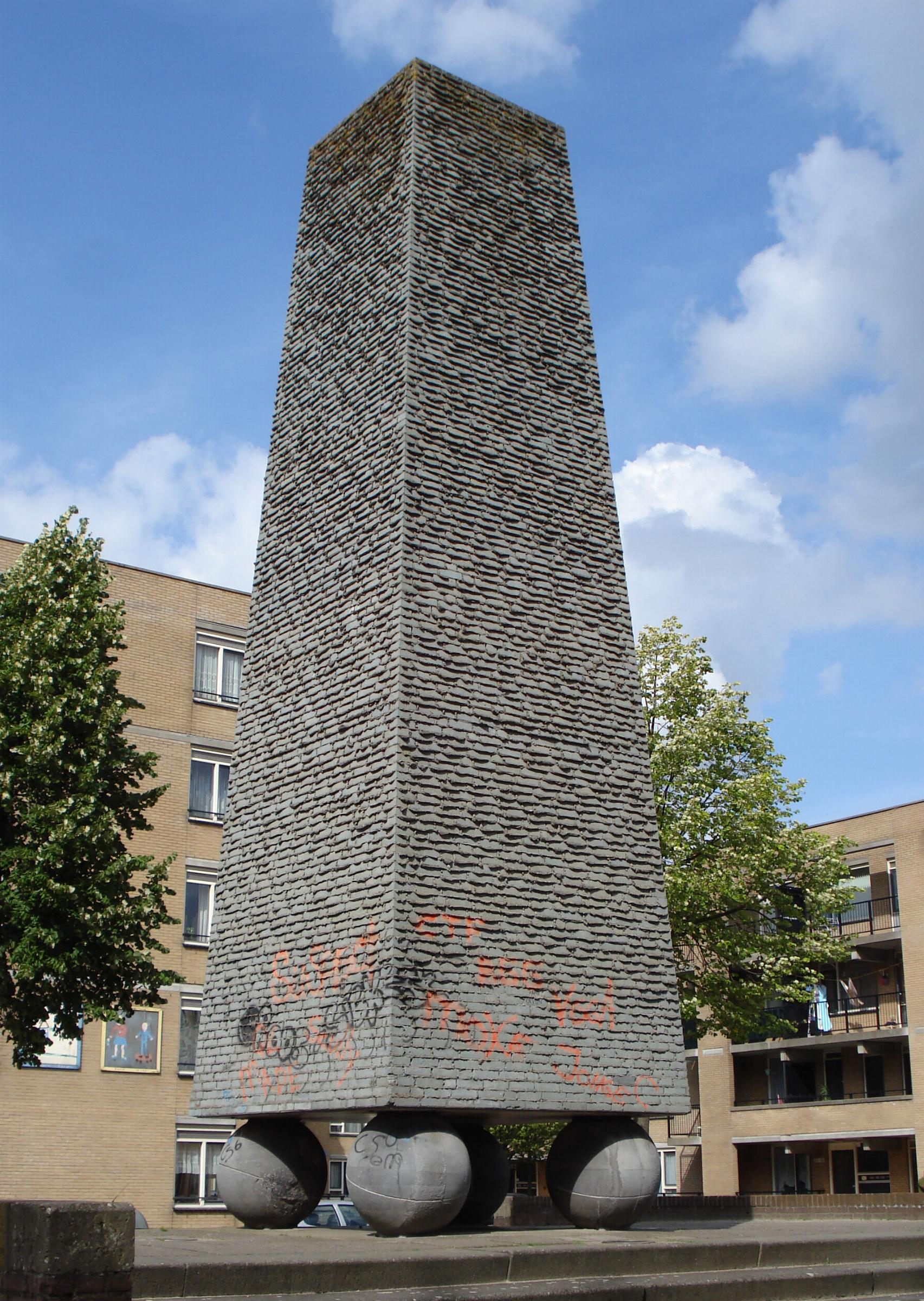
Obelisk (1987)

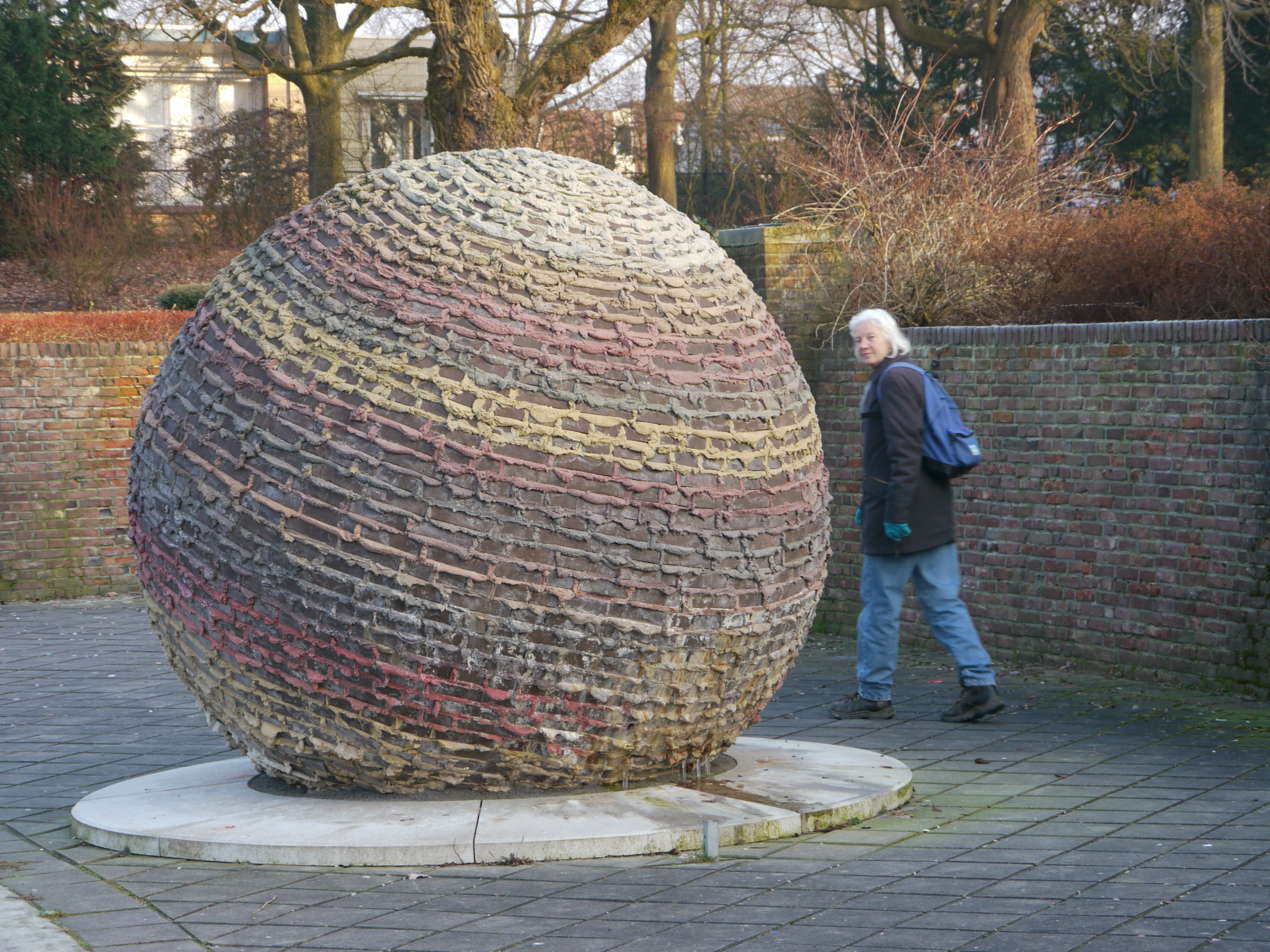
Bol-vorm (1987)

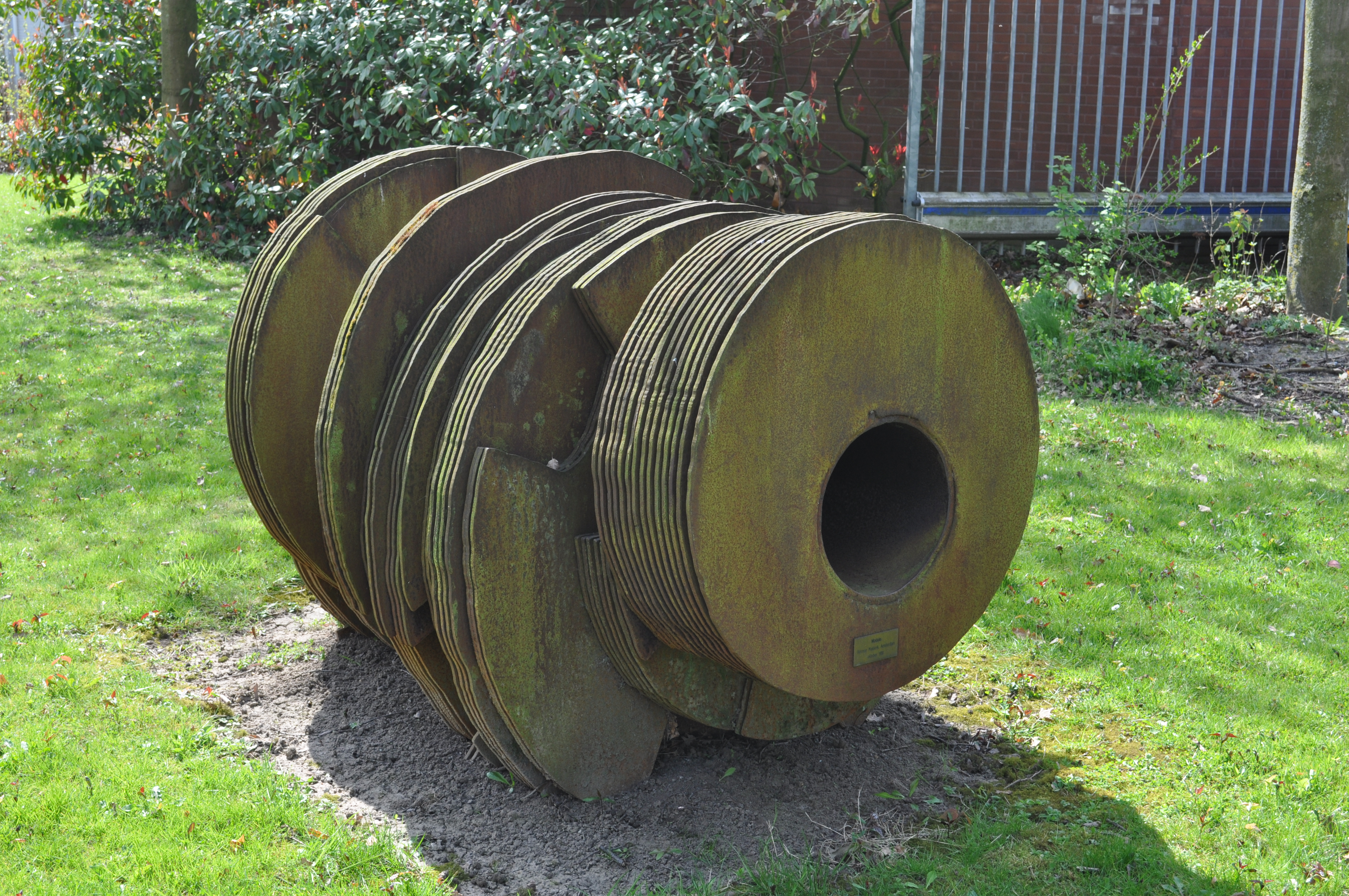
Module (1988)

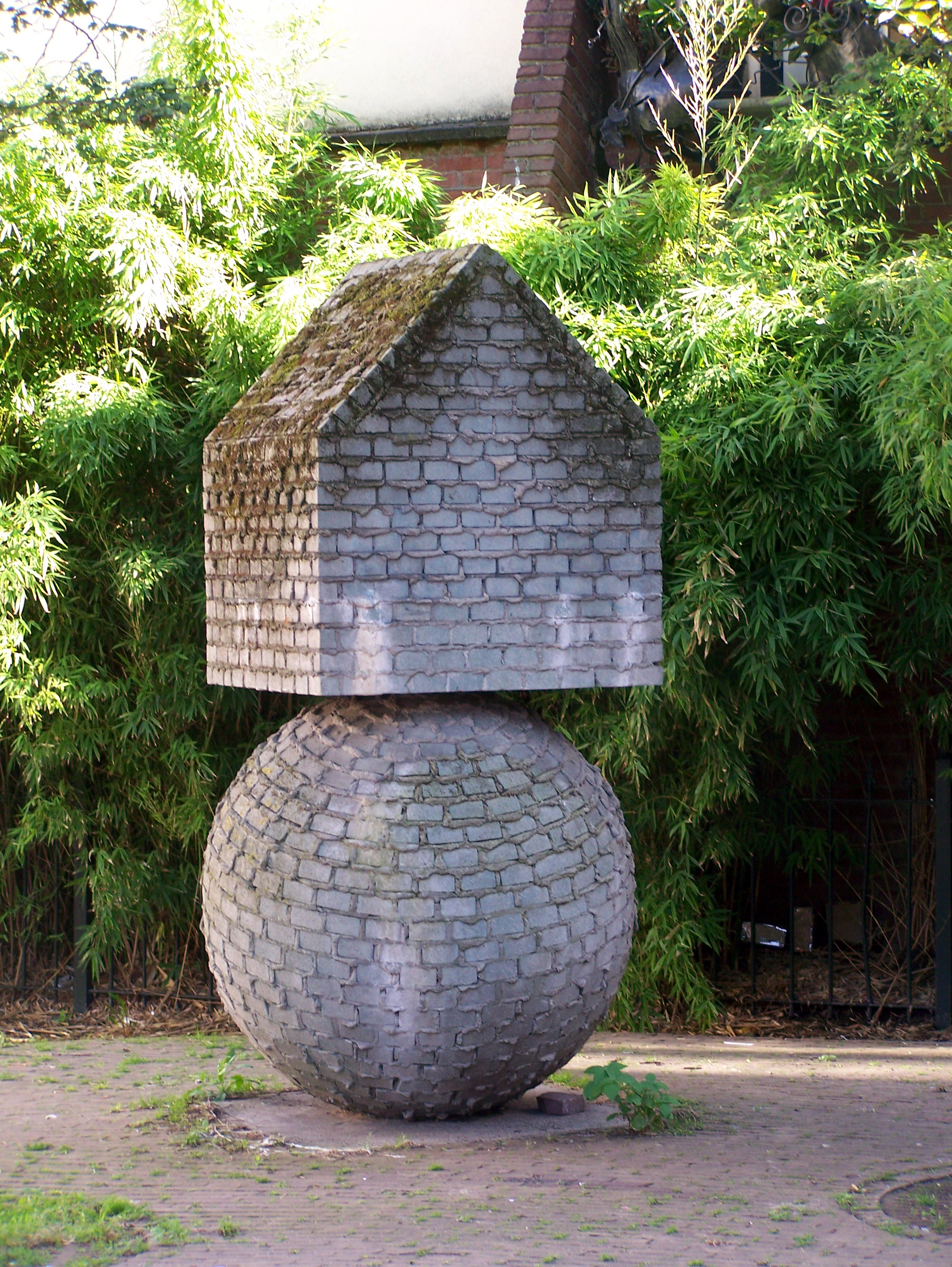
Planeet (1991)

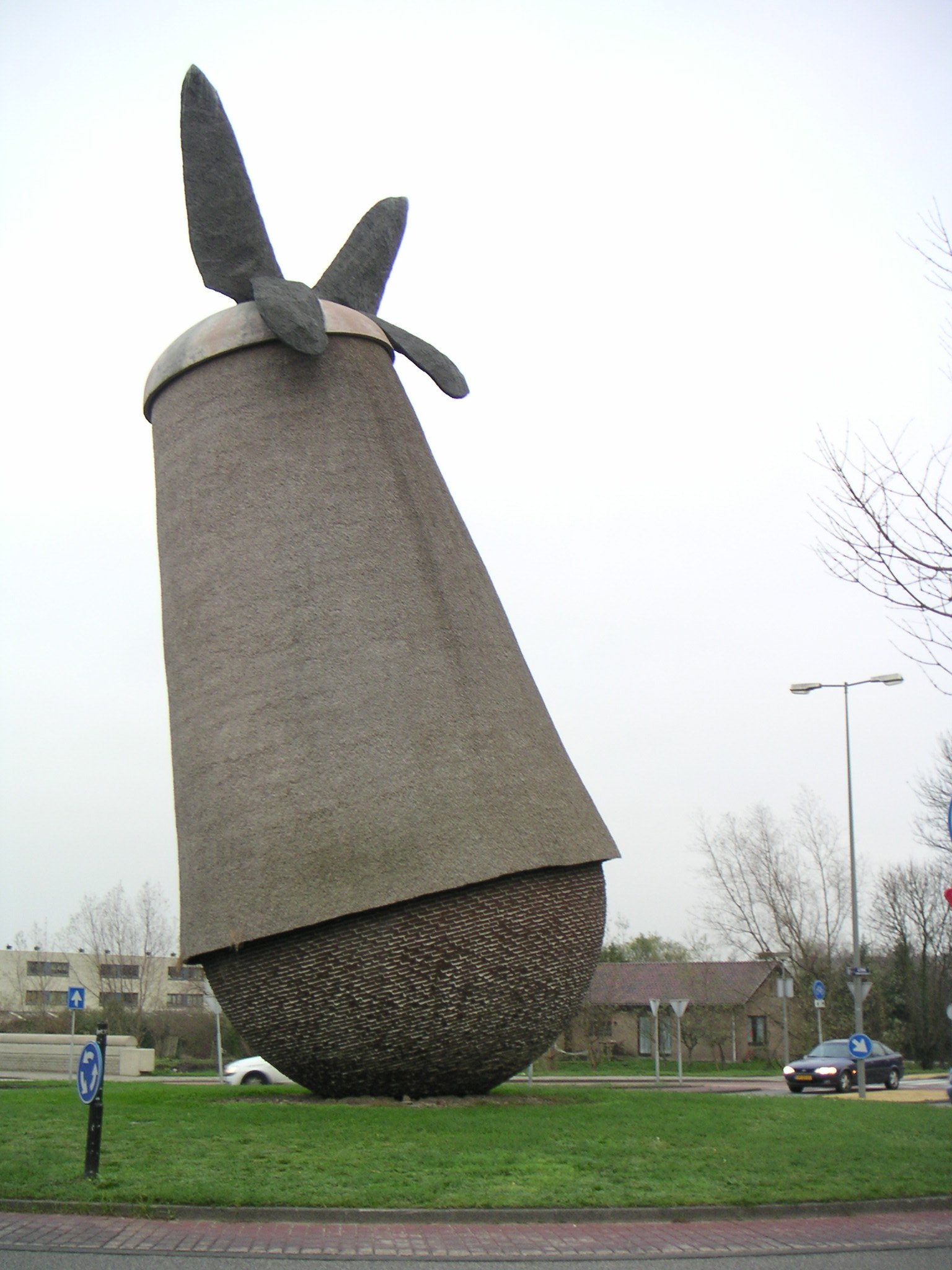
Vlindermolen (1993) in Amsterdam Sloten

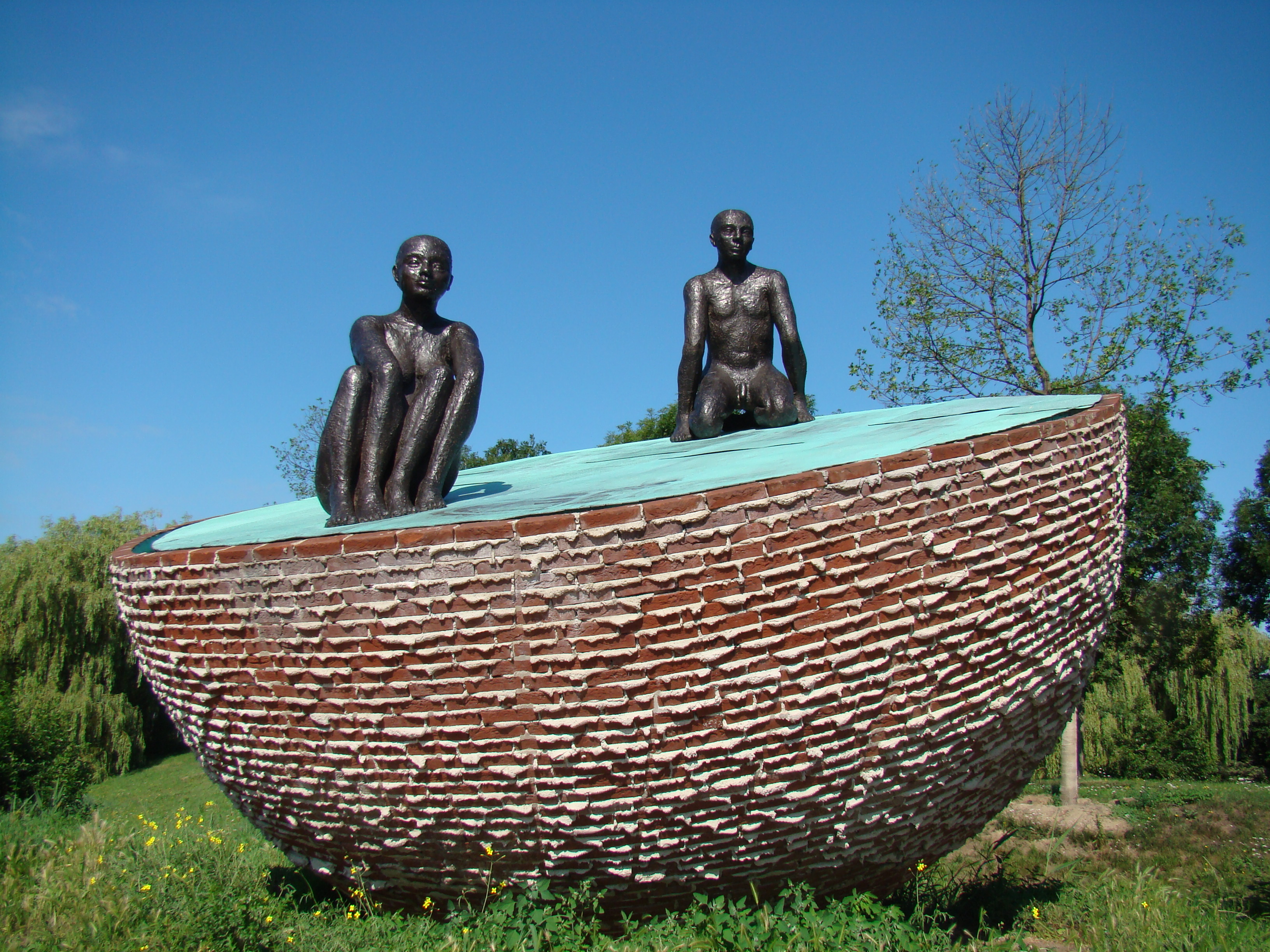
Bolbewoners (2003)
