= Free Word Centre =

Cultural organization in London

Free Word was an international centre for literature, literacy and free expression based at 60 Farringdon Road, Clerkenwell, London. It developed local, national and international collaborations that explored the transformative power of words.

Free Word was a charity. It relied on the generosity of supporters and its core funders Arts Council England and Fritt Ord, as well as income from hiring out its space.

Following the COVID-19 pandemic in April 2021, Fritt Ord confirmed its intention to sell the Farringdon building. The building was closed and its resident organisations vacated by May 2021. Following the loss of its venue, the organisation announced its closure on 27 May 2021.

== History ==
The idea for Free Word emerged in 2004, when literature and free expression organisations met to discuss ways of working together. Eight founder organisations, the project director Ursula Owen and project managers Virginia Barry and Penny Mayes worked together over several years. In 2007 Fritt Ord, a Norwegian foundation, was persuaded by their vision and purchased the former newsroom and archive building of The Guardian newspaper in Farringdon Road for Free Word.

Free Word Centre opened in June 2009 and hosted seven Resident organisations, including ARTICLE 19, English PEN, Arvon, Apples and Snakes, The Literary Consultancy and The Reading Agency. As well as providing office space for its residents, it hosted a programme of public events.

== Former Residents ==
The following seven organisations were residents at Free Word Centre prior to its closure:

- Apples & Snakes
- ARTICLE 19
- The Arvon Foundation
- Booktrust
- English PEN
- The Literary Consultancy
- The Reading Agency
