= Julia Blackburn =

British author (born 1948)

Julia Blackburn FRSL
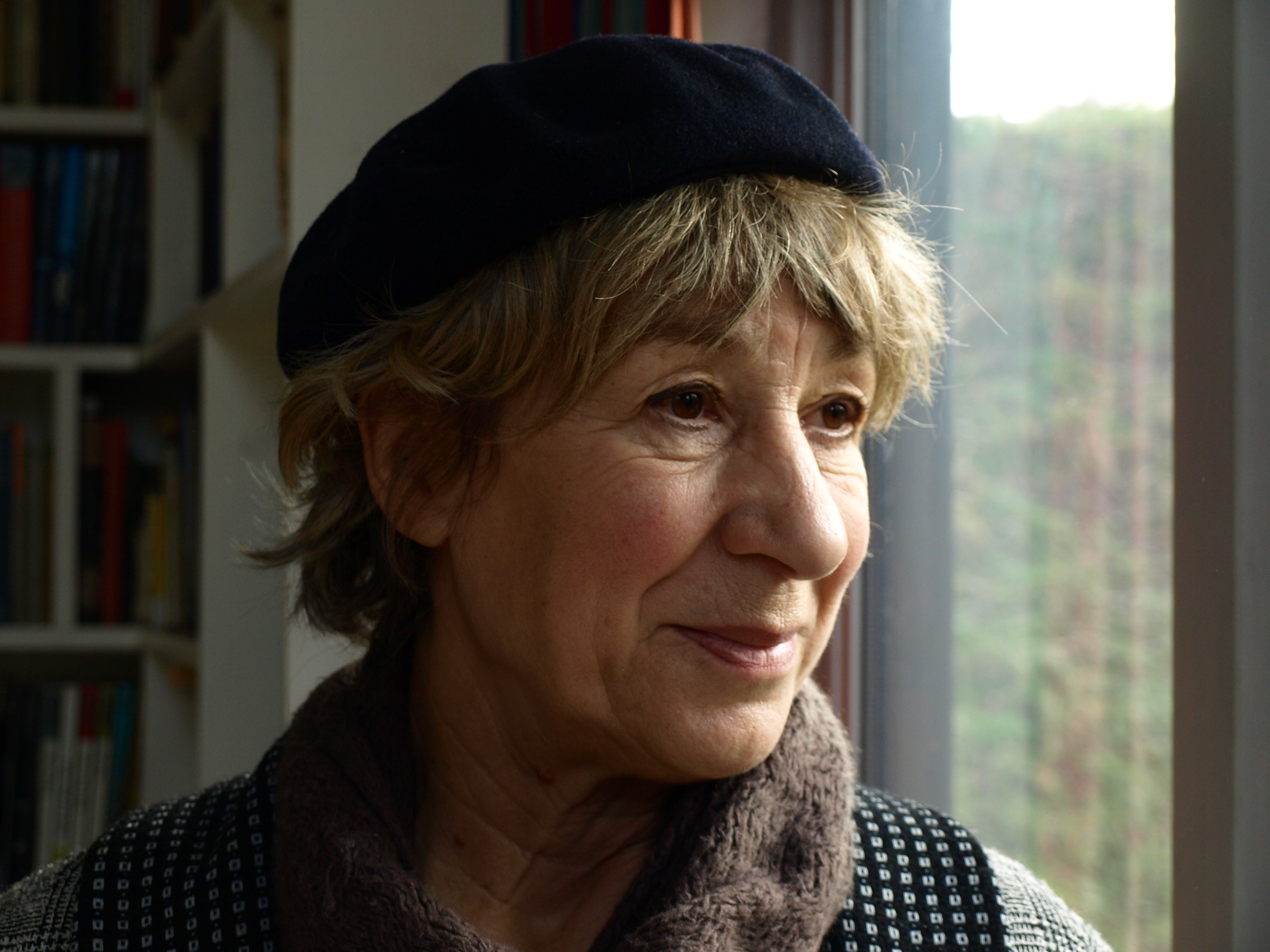
- Blackburn in 2013 (photo by Herman Makkink)
- Born: 1948 (age 77–78)
- Occupation: Author
- Notable work: The Book of Colour (1995); The Leper's Companions (1999); The Three of Us (2008)
- Spouse: Herman Makkink (m. 1999; died 2013)
- Parent(s): Thomas Blackburn and Rosalie de Meric
- Awards: PEN/Ackerley Prize
- Website: juliablackburn.com

Julia Blackburn (born 1948) is a British author of both fiction and non-fiction. She is the daughter of poet Thomas Blackburn and artist Rosalie de Meric.

Blackburn was elected a Fellow of the Royal Society of Literature in 2002.

Blackburn's bohemian and troubled upbringing is the subject of her memoir The Three of Us (2008), which won the PEN/Ackerley Prize.

In 1999, she married Dutch artist and sculptor Herman Makkink (1937–2013).

== Awards and honours ==
- 1996: Orange Prize, shortlist, The Book of Colour
- 1999: Orange Prize, shortlist, The Leper's Companions
- 1999: James Tait Black Memorial Prize (Best Novel), nominee, The Leper's Companions
- 2009: J. R. Ackerley Award, winner, The Three of Us
- 2011: Costa Book Awards (Biography), shortlist, Thin Paths: Journeys in and Around an Italian Mountain Village
- 2012: Dolman Best Travel Book Award, shortlist, Thin Paths: Journeys in and around an Italian Mountain Village
- 2019: Wainwright Prize, shortlist, Time Song: Searching for Doggerland

== Bibliography ==
=== Novels ===
- The Book of Colour (1995)
- The Leper's Companions (1999)

=== Non-fiction ===
- The White Men: The First Response of Aboriginal Peoples to the White Man (1979)
- Charles Waterton, 1782–1865: Conservationist and Traveller (1991)
- Daisy Bates in the Desert: A Woman's Life Among the Aborigines (1994)
- The Emperor's Last Island: Journey to St. Helena (2000)
- Old Man Goya (2002)
- With Billie: A New Look at the Unforgettable Lady Day (2005). Vintage. ISBN 0-375-40610-7. – includes material from interviews conducted by Linda Lipnack Kuehl
- My Animals and Other Family (2007)
- The Three of Us: A Family Story (2008)
- Thin Paths: Journeys in and Around an Italian Mountain Village (2011)
- Threads: The Delicate Life of John Craske (2015)
- Time Song: Searching for Doggerland (2019); in the US: Time Song: Journeys in Search of a Submerged Land (2019)
- Dreaming the Karoo: A People Called the /Xam [sic] (2022)
