= The Book of Colour =

1995 novel by Julia Blackburn

- Author: Julia Blackburn
- Language: English
- Publisher: Pantheon Books
- Publication date: September 12, 1995
- Publication place: USA

The Book of Colour is a novel by British author Julia Blackburn, published in 1995 by Pantheon Books. Blackburn's first novel, the book was praised by critics and shortlisted for the Women's Prize for Fiction.

== Background ==
The Book of Colour was the first novel by Blackburn, a writer previously best-known for her biographies. Blackburn stated the novel was based on her own family history.

== Summary ==
The narrative begins with a missionary on a 19th-century island in the Indian Ocean. His actions form the basis for the remainder of the story which follows his descendants. The novel explores themes of racial intolerance and guilt.

== Reception ==
The Book of Colour was mostly well-received by critics. Writing in the New York Times, Michiko Kakutani called the book "a dense, poetic tale of a family's inheritance." Kirkus Reviews said the book was a "first novel of beauty and accomplishment". Publishers Weekly offered a mixed review, describing the novel's central question as "dishearteningly rhetorical".

== Awards ==
The Book of Colour was shortlisted for the inaugural Women's Prize for Fiction in 1996.
