= Richard Beard (author) =

English author (born 1967)

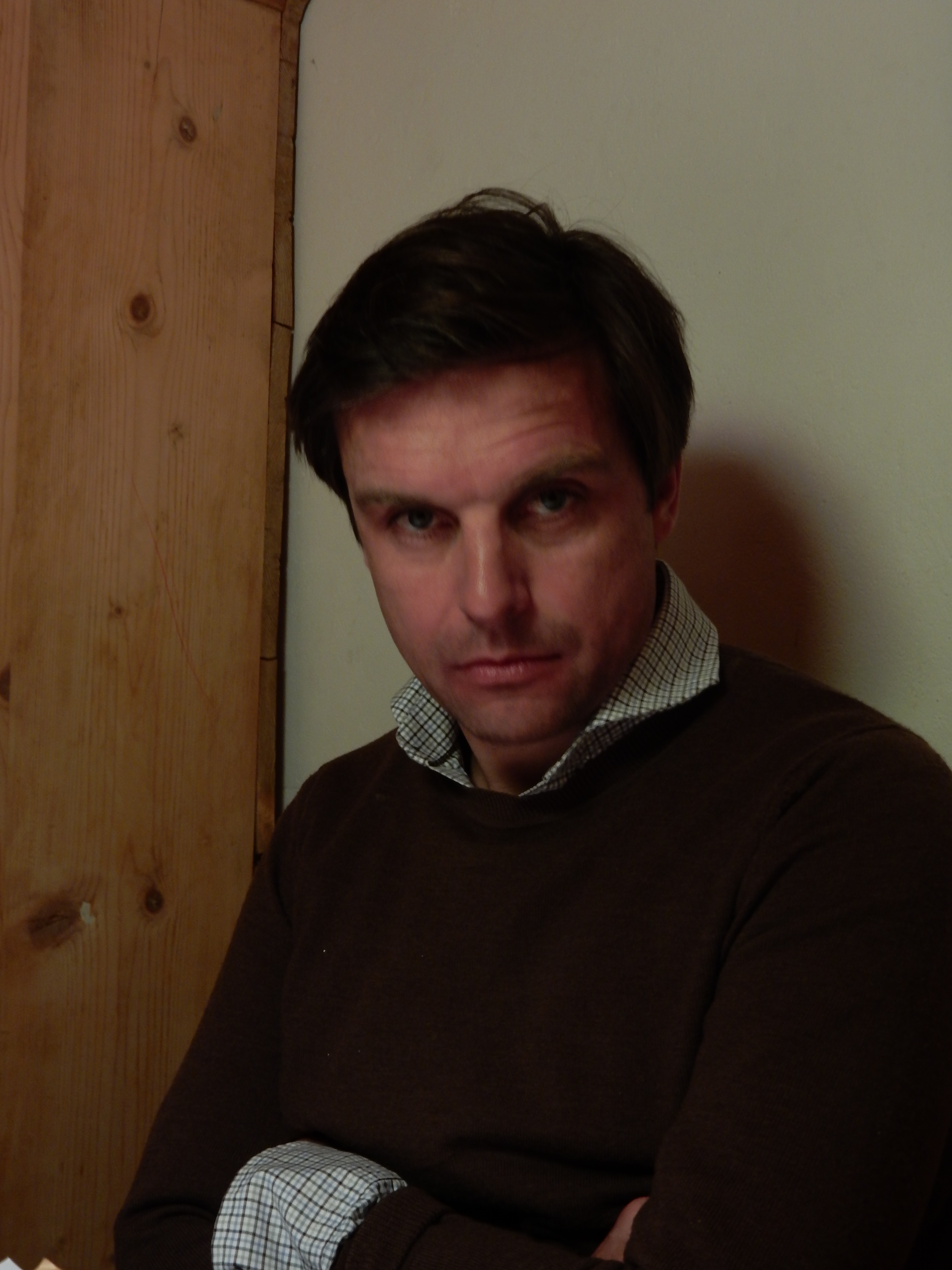
- Born: Richard James Beard; 12 January 1967 (age 59); Swindon, Wiltshire, England
- Citizenship: British
- Education: Pembroke College, Cambridge; University of East Anglia
- Occupation: Author
- Children: 3
- Writing career
- Genres: Literary fiction, non-fiction, Autobiography
- Notable works: Damascus; Acts of the Assassins; The Day That Went Missing
- Notable awards: 2018 PEN/Ackerley Prize
- Website: Richard Beard Writer

Richard James Beard (born 12 January 1967) is an English author of fiction and non-fiction books and short literature. He is the winner of the 2018 Ackerley Prize for his memoir The Day That Went Missing.

== Early life and education ==
Beard was born in Swindon, England. He is the second of four sons of Felicity, a former nurse, and Colin, an executive with a family construction company. When he was a teenager, his parents adopted two daughters.

When Beard was eleven years old, his younger brother Nicky drowned while the two of them were swimming together in the sea on a family holiday in Cornwall, out of sight of anyone else. This event and its aftermath would be recounted by Beard forty years later in his 2017 memoir The Day That Went Missing.

Beard was educated at Pinewood School, a boys' prep boarding school from the age of eight, and then later at the public school Radley College, leaving in 1985.

He earned a bachelor's degree in English from Pembroke College, Cambridge. He later completed a master's degree in Creative Writing (Prose Fiction) at the University of East Anglia.

== Writing career ==
=== Novels ===
Beard's first few novels are experimental works in the literary tradition of Oulipo, in which an artificial constraint is imposed on the narrative. X20, A Novel of Not Smoking (1996) is constructed in twenty parts, each containing an identical number of words, to represent the twenty cigarettes in a pack (the story's narrator is trying to quit the habit and makes himself write something every time he has the urge to light up). In 1997, it was a New York Times Summer Reading Selection. The Sunday Times called it "an unusually intelligent, funny and readable first book."

All of the action in Beard's second novel, Damascus (1998), occurs on 1 November 1993 (the day on which the Maastricht Treaty took effect and all British people became citizens of the European Union), and in writing it, he used – with twelve notable exceptions – only nouns which appeared in the issue of The Times published on that day. The book uses a nonlinear timeline to tell the tale of a young couple who meet in person for the first time since they were children, fall into bed together and then must decide whether or not it is the beginning of a new life. It was a New York Times Notable Book in 1999. Publishers Weekly called Damascus "Good-natured, witty and freshly inventive... Beard's manipulation of language and of events to make the thematic point sometimes mitigates the credibility of the characters' motivations; still, the brilliance and daring of his work earns the reader's appreciation.".

Beard set his next novel, The Cartoonist (2000), about a man and his teen-girl cousin who set out for a major theme park with plans for sabotage, in Euro Disney. But after completing the manuscript, he was informed by a libel lawyer that under copyright law, he was forbidden to use the name of that theme park at all. He had to re-write the entire book before it could be published, to avoid a defamation suit.

His fourth novel, Dry Bones (2004), is about a church deacon in Geneva who finds a lucrative but dangerous new career in robbing the graves of celebrities.

Beard has published two novels based on biblical stories: The first, Lazarus is Dead (2011) retraces the relationship between Jesus and Lazarus, and was described by The Guardian as "a shining example of the gospel untruth".

2015's Acts of the Assassins (re-titled The Apostle Killer for the 2016 U.S. release) re-imagines Jesus's death and resurrection as a modern-day crime thriller in a genre Beard described as "gospel noir". It was shortlisted for the Goldsmiths Prize. Alex Preston, writing in The Guardian, called Acts "brilliantly original and absurdly compelling...it's a book you’ll read in one, frantic gasp." Philip Hensher likewise praised the book in The Guardian, calling it "remarkable" and saying of the author: "Beard is a radical and inventive novelist."

=== Non-fiction books ===
Beard's non-fiction works often combine aspects of travel writing and memoir.

His first work of non-fiction, Muddied Oafs, The Last Days of Rugger (2003), traces the changes to the game of rugby union in the wake of professionalisation. Beard looks at his own many years of playing the sport, from his school days to amateur British and Swiss clubs and on a professional team in France from 1992 to 1994, where he played in the position of fly-half. He debates how much longer he can continue to play as he accumulates injuries and slows down, yet dreads the thought of giving up the sport that he wants to believe has made him a better man It was longlisted for the William Hill Sports Book of the Year.

Manly Pursuits (2006), re-titled for subsequent editions to How To Beat the Australians, tells of how his frustration at Australia's regular defeat of Great Britain at sports led him to travel to the Sydney suburb of Manly to figure out just what makes Australians so competitive and attempt to beat them at various sports himself.

Becoming Drusilla (2008) is about Beard's longtime friend Dru Marland, who underwent gender reassignment, and a trip the two of them took hiking and camping across Wales after Marland's transition.

Beard's 2017 memoir The Day That Went Missing: A Family's Story is his self-described 'inquest' into the day in 1978 when he was eleven years old and his nine-year-old brother, Nicky, drowned in the sea while the two were swimming together in Cornwall on a family holiday, as well as his family's subsequent near-erasure of both the event and of memories of Nicky himself. Widely lauded by critics, the book was described by Publishers Weekly as "stunning...Beard reimagines the brother he lost. His beautifully written story is heartbreaking and unforgettable as he struggles with the grief he chose to forget and, now, attempts to remember again." The memoir was a finalist for the Rathbones Folio Prize, the James Tait Black Memorial Prize and the National Book Critics Circle Award, and won the 2018 Ackerley Prize for a literary biography of excellence.

=== Other writing ===
Beard was shortlisted for the 2008 BBC National Short Story Award for his short story "Guidelines for Measures to Cope with Disgraceful and Other Events" and longlisted for the 2010 Sunday Times EFG Short Story Award for the story "James Joyce, EFL Teacher". The latter story was formatted for the iPad app 'Papercut', which combines sound, video and text to tell stories: Beard could be heard reading aloud parts of the story while video and snippets of text scrolled across the screen. His short stories and short non-fiction have appeared in Granta and Prospect and have been recorded for BBC Radio 4.

He has contributed book reviews to The Times and The Times Literary Supplement.

In connection with the publication of The Day That Went Missing in 2017, Beard penned two articles for the Guardian. In them, he discussed what he had discovered about both the younger brother he lost and about himself through writing the book, and the emotional impact that it had on him and his family.

In 2025 he published The Universal Turing Machine, a book-length whole-life memoir available for free online. The 'machine' starts with a chessboard marked with years from 1967 to 2030, and invites the reader to choose a knight-like route around the board, from one year to another. This is a life story revealed at the rate of 1,000 words per year. Other writers are invited to submit their own work following the same template to make a growing network of memoirs.

== Personal life ==
While beginning his career as a writer, Beard taught school in Hong Kong and was employed as a physical education teacher in Great Britain. He also worked at the Bibliothèque nationale de France and spent a year as private secretary and ghostwriter to Mathilda, Duchess of Argyll.

An avid sports enthusiast, Beard played professional rugby in France from 1992 to 1994 (as well as in amateur leagues in England, Switzerland and Japan). He is an opening batsman for both the Clifton Hampden Cricket Club and the Authors XI cricket team and he contributed a chapter to the Authors' book about their first season playing together, The Authors XI: A Season of English Cricket from Hackney to Hambledon.

He taught British Studies at the University of Tokyo from 2003-2006 (and returned as a visiting professor from 2016-2017), and was Director of the National Academy of Writing from 2009 until 2017. He has a creative writing fellowship with the University of East Anglia.

In 1997 and 2015, Beard received an Arts Council Authors Award and in 2000, he was the recipient of a grant from the K Blundell Trust. He has been selected as a writer-in-residence at Gladstone's Library. In 2017, he was a juror for Canada's Scotiabank Giller Prize.

He has three children and resides in Oxfordshire, England.

== List of written works ==
=== Books (fiction) ===
- X20, A Novel of Not Smoking (1996), ISBN 978-1559703994
- Damascus (1998), ISBN 978-0006497912
- The Cartoonist (2000), ISBN 978-0747553311
- Dry Bones (2004), ISBN 978-0099459255
- Lazarus is Dead (2011), ISBN 978-1609450809
- Acts of the Assassins (re-titled The Apostle Killer for the U.S. release) (2015), ISBN 978-1846558399

=== Books (non-fiction) ===
- Muddied Oafs: The Last Days of Rugger (2003), ISBN 978-0224063944
- Manly Pursuits (re-titled How to Beat the Australians for subsequent editions) (2006), ISBN 978-0224075114
- Becoming Drusilla (2008), ISBN 978-0099507734f
- The Day That Went Missing: A Family's Story (2017), ISBN 978-1910701560
- Sad Little Men: Private Schools and the Ruin of England (2021), ISBN 978-1787302938

=== Short fiction ===
- Hearing Myself Think (Published in Prospect, 29 April 2007)
- Guidelines for Measures to Cope with Disgraceful and Other Events (2008)
- James Joyce, EFL Teacher (2010)
- Lift Under Inspection Do Not Touch (Published in anthology Still: Short Stories Inspired by Photographs of Vacated Spaces: Negative Press, 2012) ISBN 978-0957382800

=== Short non-fiction ===
- How to Stop Your Mother-in-Law from Drowning (Published in Granta issue 88, Winter 2005)
- Rain (Included in The Authors XI: A Season of English Cricket from Hackney to Hambledon: Bloomsbury, 2013) ISBN 978-1408840450
- To Live Outside the Law You Must Be Honest (Commissioned by the International Literature Showcase, 2017)
- The Archangel's Way (Published in Hinterland (magazine) issue 2, Summer 2019)
