= Alice Jolly =

English novelist, playwright and memoirist

Alice Jolly (born 1966) is an English novelist, playwright and memoirist. She has won the Royal Society of Literature V.S. Pritchett Short Story prize, the PEN/Ackerley Prize, an O. Henry Award, and the Walter Scott Prize.

== Life ==
Jolly graduated from Worcester College, Oxford with a degree in Modern History in 1989.

She teaches on the Creative Writing M.St. course at the University of Oxford.

She is married to a lawyer, Stephen Kinsella. They have two children, Thomas and Hope, and live in Gloucestershire.

== Writing career ==
In 2014, Jolly was awarded the Royal Society of Literature's V.S. Pritchett Memorial Prize for her short story, Ray the Rottweiler.

In 2016, she was awarded the PEN/Ackerley Prize for Dead Babies and Seaside Towns, her crowdfunded memoir about the experience of using a surrogate to carry her second child.

Her novel Mary Ann Sate, Imbecile was runner up for The Rathbones Folio Prize in 2019 and was also longlisted for The Ondaatje Prize also in 2019.

She was awarded an O. Henry Award in 2021 for her story "From Far Around They Saw Us Burn".

In 2026, The Matchbox Girl, her novel about a mute autistic girl in Nazi Germany, won the Walter Scott Prize.

She reviews for The Times Literary Supplement, The Literary Review and The Guardian.

She has also written plays for the Everyman Theatre, Cheltenham and the Cheltenham Literature Festival.

== Published works ==
- What the Eye Doesn’t See (Simon & Schuster, 2003)
- If Only You Knew (Simon & Schuster, 2006)
- Dead Babies and Seaside Towns (Unbound, 2015)
- Mary Ann Sate, Imbecile (Unbound, 2018)
- Between the Regions of Kindness (Unbound 2019)
- A Saint in Swindon (Fairlight, 2020)
- The Matchbox Girl (Bloomsbury, 2025)
