= Claire Armitstead =

British journalist and author

Claire Armitstead FRSL
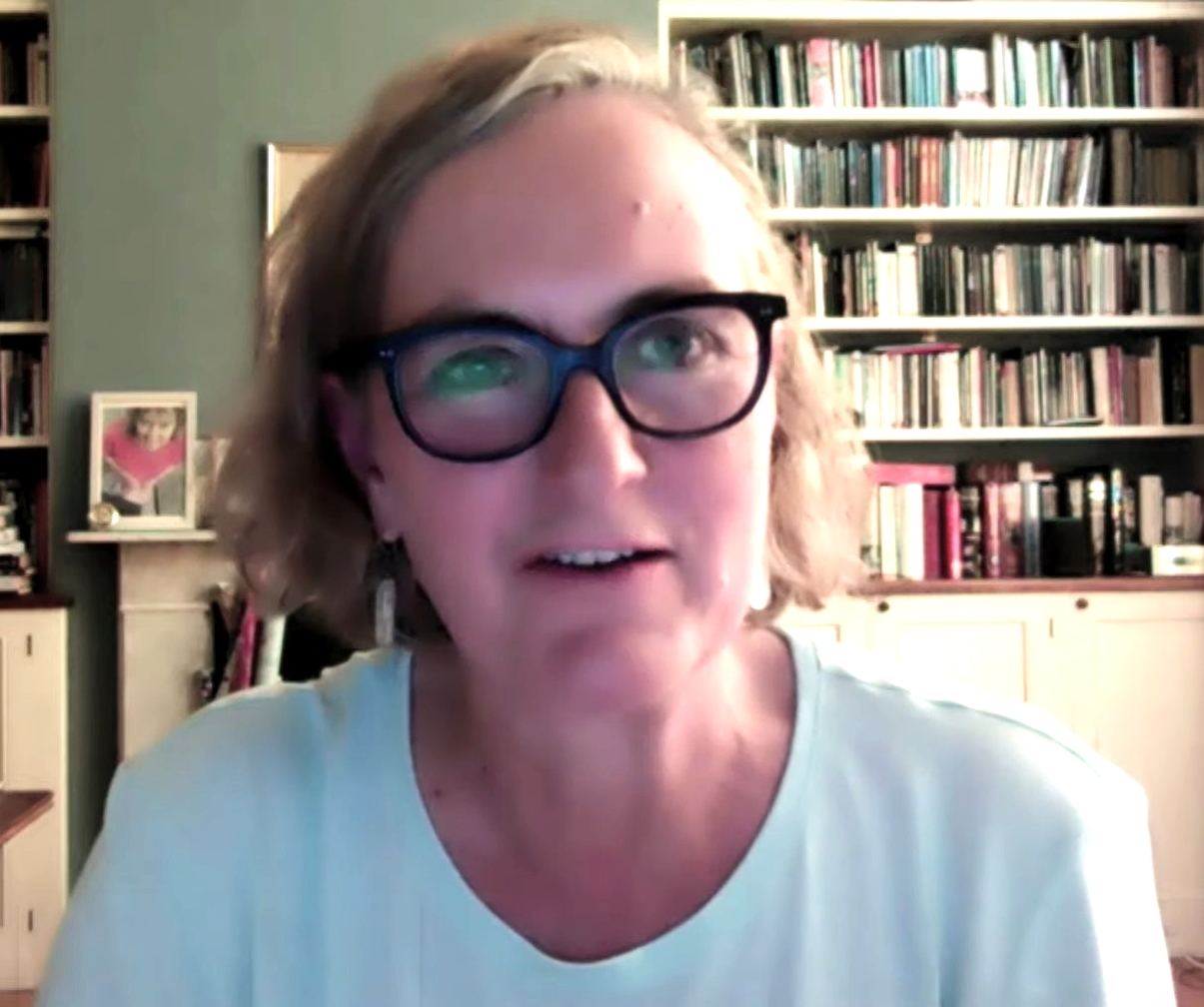
- Armitstead in 2021
- Born: London, England
- Occupations: Journalist and author

Claire Armitstead FRSL is a British journalist and author. She is Associate Editor (Culture) at The Guardian, where she has worked since 1992. She is also a cultural commentator on literature and the arts, and makes appearances on radio and television, as well as leading workshops and chairing literary events in the UK and at international festivals. She has judged literary competitions including the Royal Society Winton Prize for Science Books, the OCM Bocas Prize for Caribbean Literature, the DSC Prize for South Asian Literature, the PEN Pinter Prize and the Scotiabank Giller Prize.

== Biography ==
Armitstead was born in south London, England, and spent her early childhood in Northern Nigeria, attending primary school in Kaduna.

== Place of work ==
She worked as a trainee reporter in South Wales, before joining the Hampstead & Highgate Express as a theatre critic and sub-editor, moving from there to the Financial Times and then in 1992 to The Guardian, where she has been Arts Editor, Literary Editor (in which position she was described as "Respected blue-stocking and keen cyclist who keeps the wheels turning on ever more ambitious books pages"), Head of Books and, most recently, Associate Editor (Culture).

== Publication ==
Armitstead's essays have been published in New Performance (Macmillan, 1994) and Women: A Cultural Review (Oxford University Press, 1996). She was editor of The Bedside Guardian 2016, which Ian Sansom described as "a work I confidently predict will stand the test of time." Armitstead also edited Tales of Two Londons: Stories From a Fractured City (O/R Books, 2018), an anthology that (as explained in the Introduction) "sets out to mirror London's diversity by ensuring that more than a third of the voices are of those not born in the UK", and about which The London Magazine reviewer wrote: "I cannot imagine anyone who has ever lived or worked in the capital not finding a point of connection or a memory resurfaced."

== Achievements ==
Armitstead has been a judge for literary competitions as varied as the 2015 Royal Society Winton Prize for Science Books, the OCM Bocas Prize for Caribbean Literature, the DSC Prize for South Asian Literature, the 2020 PEN Pinter Prize and the 2020 Scotiabank Giller Prize. She has been a trustee of English PEN since 2013.

== Further accomplishments ==
Armitstead presents The Guardian's weekly books podcast. The podcast includes interviews with authors. The show is cohosted by Richard Lea and Sian Cain. The show discusses poetry, books, and other works of literature.

In 2022, Armitstead was elected as a Fellow of The Royal Society of Literature.

== Bibliography ==
- (Editor) The Bedside Guardian 2016, Faber and Faber, 2016, ISBN 9781783561247.
- (Editor) Tales of Two Londons: Stories From a Fractured City, O/R Books, 2018, ISBN 978-1-682191-36-1. Arcadia Books, 2019, ISBN 9781911350606.
