= Brian Thompson (writer) =

British writer (1935–2021)

Brian John William Thompson (1935–2021) was a British writer.

== Life ==
Thompson was born in Lambeth, South London. His parents were Bert Thompson, a post office engineer, and Ada Mills (known as Peggy). He attended Hertford Grammar School before completing National Service with the King's African Rifles in Kenya during the Mau Mau uprising. He later studied English at Trinity College, Cambridge.

Thompson worked as a teacher in Shrewsbury and Ripon, North Yorkshire, and later served as warden of Swarthmore, an adult education centre in Leeds. There he met novelist Elizabeth North, with whom he later lived in Yorkshire and Charente, France.

== Writing ==
Notable works include his novel Buddy Boy, set in wartime Cambridge, and the play Tishoo (1979), staged in London's West End. He wrote television scripts for series such as Rockcliffe's Babies, Campion, and the BBC drama Chelworth (1989).

His biographical works include A Monkey Among Crocodiles (2001), about Victorian figure Georgina Weldon, and the memoir Keeping Mum (2006), which won the Costa Book Award for Biography. Keeping Mum detailed his parents' troubled marriage and his childhood. The sequel, Clever Girl (2007), continued this narrative.
