= The Literary Consultancy =

UK-based editorial consultancy service

- Abbreviation: TLC
- Formation: 1996; 30 years ago
- Founders: Rebecca Swift, Hannah Griffiths
- Purpose: Professional editorial advice and assessment in the English language
- Location: Free Word Centre, 60 Farringdon Road, London EC1R 3GA
- Key people: Aki Schilz (Director)
- Website: literaryconsultancy.co.uk

The Literary Consultancy (TLC) is a UK-based editorial consultancy service that was founded in 1996, becoming the first service of its kind to offer "professional, in-depth editorial advice and assessment to anyone writing in the English language, anywhere in the world". Operating under the strapline "Literary Values in a Digital Age", TLC is based at the Free Word Centre in Farringdon Road, central London. Its founding Director was Rebecca Swift (1964–2017), who set up the organisation with Hannah Griffiths after they worked together at Virago Press. The current director of TLC is Aki Schilz.

== History ==
The Literary Consultancy was established in 1996 by its founding director Rebecca Swift (1964–2017), together with Hannah Griffiths (who went on to become Publisher at Faber & Faber). While working as an editorial assistant at Virago Press, Swift realised the need for a professional editorial consultancy where writers could send manuscripts for assessment before they approached publishers and agents. As she explained:

"I felt that ... many more people were writing, as new technology made it easier than ever for people to want to put their stories down, yet the publishing environment was becoming more difficult than ever.... Editors were shed from the industry in large numbers, and editing was in some companies considered a time-wasting exercise! This is a crude generalisation, and of course all good publishers still have excellent editors working for them, but the main shift from editorially led buying to sales team buying, changed the flavour of publishing radically. ...there were so many good editors on the freelance market, and so many people writing who needed an opinion on their work. TLC was the first to establish itself in Britain, and to remove the stigma of people paying for editorial opinion and advice. After all, editing is a real skill, knowing the markets is another skill, and in my view people writing should consider paying for these skills—rather than expecting serious feedback for free.

In 2009, TLC became a resident founding member of the Free Word Centre — an international organisation for literature, literacy and freedom of expression – where events are hosted, including an annual literary conference. "The Literary Conference: Writing in a Digital Age" ran for the first time at the Free Word Centre in June 2012. In 2016, TLC's 20th birthday was celebrated with the hosting of the "industry conversation" What’s Your Story? in association with Writers' Centre Norwich, Free Word Centre, Apples & Snakes, English PEN and FMcM, featuring a specially commissioned poem by Lemn Sissay, a symposium chaired by Professor Jon Cook (University of East Anglia), and contributions from guest speakers including Kit de Waal, Giles Duley, Margaret Busby, Elif Shafak, Henny Beaumont, Mark Ball, Raymond Antrobus and Abi Morgan, following a keynote address by TLC founder Becky Swift.

Following Swift's death from cancer in April 2017, Aki Schilz became TLC's new Director.

== Activities ==
For its manuscript reading and assessment service, TLC draws on a team of more than 80 editors and readers to assess writing at all levels, across fiction, non-fiction, short stories, poetry, scripts and screenplays. In addition, TLC offers the Chapter and Verse mentoring scheme, both commercially and with places available as bursaries enabled by Arts Council England funding, and also programmes and runs events, classes and a "Literary Adventure" holiday overseas.

In 2015, with increased Arts Council England funding (TLC is an Arts Council National Portfolio Organisation) TLC expanded its Free Reads Scheme to deliver the Quality Writing for All Campaign, in partnership with 17 regional literature development organisations, for high quality, low-income writers, with a special focus on supporting Black, Asian and Minority Ethnic (BAME) and disabled writers across the UK with manuscript assessment bursaries.

Schilz has said, "We're lucky enough to be both well-connected and well-regarded, and can also refer writers onwards to various trusted services for things like copy-editing, proofreading, and publishing services. Where we see manuscripts of a particularly high quality, we are often able to help writers onwards towards publication, usually via agents."

== Collaborations ==
TLC has worked and works in partnership with a number of organisations, including the Royal Society of Literature, The Guardian, Media Futures and the Alliance of Independent Authors, of which it is a Partner Member. TLC's commercial services are available to writers worldwide, but within the UK it works with 17 regional literature development bodies across England for its Free Read bursary scheme for low-income writers, including Spread the Word, New Writing North and Arvon Foundation, as well as supporting a number of prizes (SI Leeds Literary Prize, Mslexia First Novel Award, Bridport First Novel Award) and other literary ventures.

=== The Rebecca Swift Foundation ===
In May 2018, The Literary Consultancy announced the establishment of The Rebecca Swift Foundation, an independent grant-making foundation and poetry award, inspired by Rebecca Swift's "two key passions: poetry and the empowerment of women".
