= Jerusalem the Golden =

Margaret Drabble novel

First edition (publ. Weidenfeld & Nicolson)

Jerusalem the Golden is a novel by Margaret Drabble. Published in 1967, it won the James Tait Black Memorial Prize.

== Development and title ==
Jerusalem the Golden assembles a number of autobiographical elements: like Clara, Drabble grew up in Yorkshire, was the middle of three sisters, and some of the characters resemble family members. Mrs Maugham is "based on [Drabble's] maternal grandmother."

The title is taken from the hymn of the same name; frequently Drabble uses titles that point towards Biblical references: such as in The Millstone and The Needle's Eye.

== Characters ==
- Clara Maugham - the main character for the novel. Clara is a young intelligent, attractive and bright student in her final year at a London university.
- Clelia - an artist and actress whom Clara envies and wants to emulate.
- Mrs. Maugham - Clara's "miserable" mother, loosely "based on [Drabble's] maternal grandmother." Critic Lisa Allardice attributes the mean personality to a "pinched interior life".
- Gabriel Denham - Clelia's brother, a writer with whom Clara becomes romantically involved.

== Themes ==
Like many of Drabble's other novels, the novel focuses on topics relevant to women and gender. For example, G. Suchita describes the novel as exhibiting "liberationist tendencies" familiar with the feminist trends of 1960s. Suchita compares the female protagonist, Clara, to other women characters Emma from The Garrick Year and Louise from A Summer Bird-Cage, both which use "sex as a social advancement", creating power over men through sexual conquest. However, as critic Lisa Allardice noted she isn't writing "feminist" novels, but "merely writing about the world around her, and her own experiences as a young woman during the period".

Similarly, in reviewing the novel for The Guardian, critic Lisa Allardice noted the importance of intense female relationships, in a format similar to other novels by Drabble, including her earlier novels: debut novel A Summer Bird-Cage and The Waterfall.

== Intertextuality ==
Drabble writes the novel into the larger literary tradition, by evoking motifs and features from numerous other works. The title is a biblical reference, and she "frequently evokes" Thomas Hardy, making explicit references to Tess of the D'Urbervilles. When reviewing the book, critic Lisa Allardice also notes the close resemblance of the novel's structure and plot to the later An Experiment in Love by Hilary Mantel.

== Critical reception ==
In rereading the novel at the time of its republication with Penguin Modern Classics, critic Lisa Allardice described the novel as " very much a fairytale of its time". Allardice described the novel as successful, and exhibiting the "moral ambiguity and wisdom of Drabble's early fiction, along with the wit and elegance of her prose". She concluded by claiming that it should be as well read as its predecessor, The Millstone.
