= Tollund Man =

Iron Age bog body from Denmark

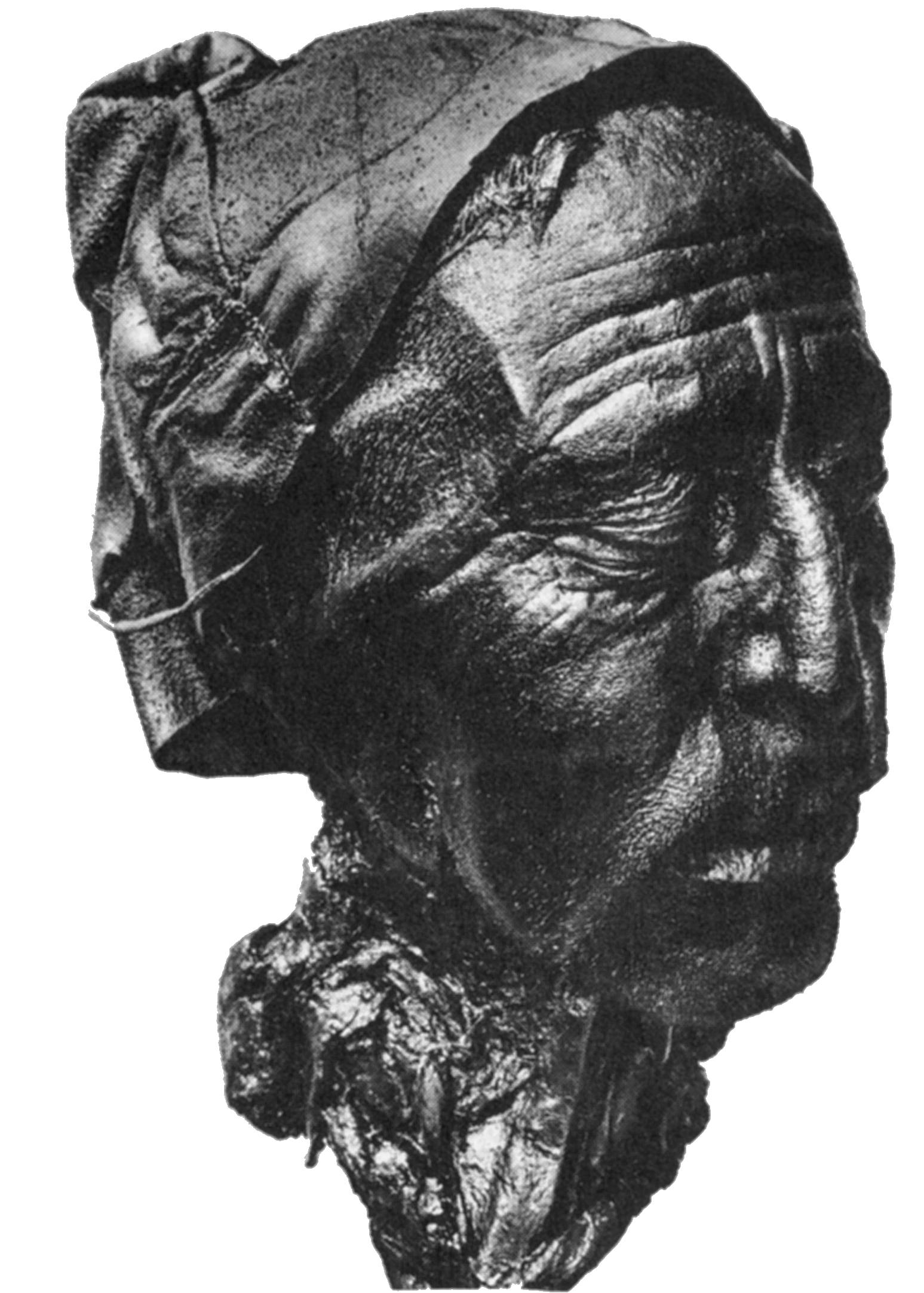
- The Tollund Man's preserved head
- Born: c. 445–420 BCE
- Died: c. 405–384 BCE (aged ~40) present-day Tollund, Denmark
- Cause of death: Hanging (presumably ritual sacrifice or execution)
- Body discovered: May 8, 1950; 76 years ago Silkeborg, Denmark; 56°9′52″N 9°23′34″E
- Height: 161 cm (5 ft 3 in)

The Tollund Man (Danish: Tollundmanden; died between 405 and 384 BCE) is a naturally mummified corpse of a man who lived during the period characterised in Scandinavia as the Pre-Roman Iron Age. The mummy, found in 1950, was preserved as a bog body near Silkeborg on the Jutland peninsula in Denmark. The man's physical features were so well preserved that he was mistaken for a recent murder-victim. Twelve years before his discovery, another bog body, the Elling Woman, had been found in the same bog.

The cause of death has been forensically determined as hanging. There is insufficient evidence to determine the reason for the killing: whether a ritual sacrifice or a punitive execution.

== Discovery ==
On 8 May 1950, Tollund Man was discovered in the peat layer of the peat bog, 12 km (7.5 mi) west of Silkeborg, Denmark, by peat cutters Viggo and Emil Hojgaard after Viggo's wife, Grethe Hojgaard, noticed his body in a peat pit. His remains were so well preserved that the family believed they had discovered the victim of a recent murder, and the police were called.

After determining that the remains were archaeological rather than forensic, the police consulted archaeologist Peter Vilhelm Glob of Aarhus University, who estimated that Tollund Man was approximately 2,000 years old. He was enclosed within a block of surrounding peat before being transported by horse cart and railway to the National Museum of Denmark in Copenhagen. There, conservator Knud Thorvildsen, who had previously recovered the Borremose bodies, excavated Tollund Man from the peat for examination.

Tollund Man lay 60 m (200 ft) from firm ground, buried beneath 2.3 m (7 ft 7 in) of peat, with his body arranged in a fetal position.

== Clothing and associated items ==
He wore a pointed skin cap of sheepskin and wool, fastened beneath his chin by a hide thong, and a smooth hide belt around his waist. A noose made of plaited animal hide was drawn tightly around his neck and trailed down his back. Other than these items, Tollund Man was naked.

== Condition ==
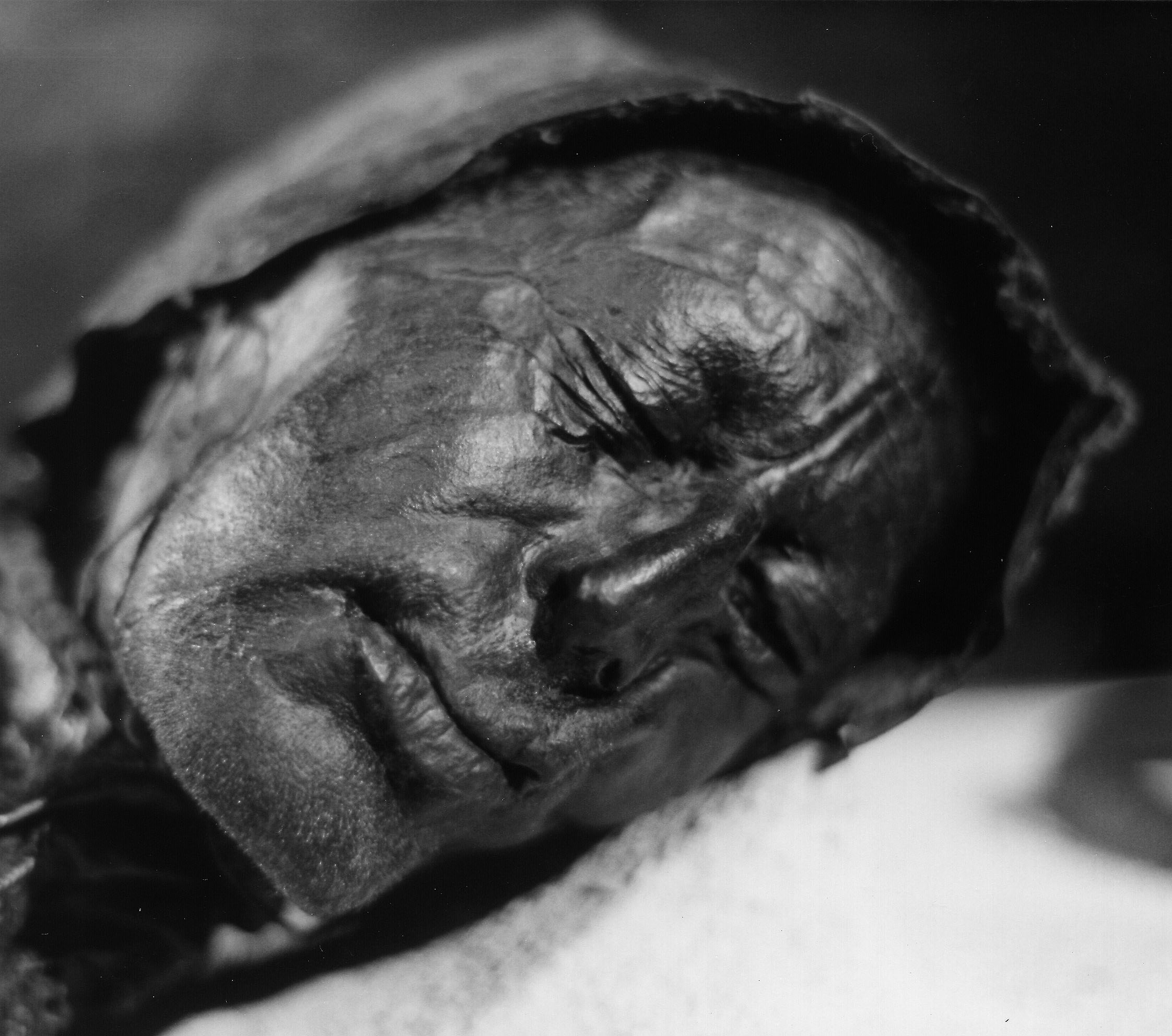

More than two millennia after his death, his eyes and mouth remained gently closed, while his facial skin, wrinkles, eyelashes and short beard stubble were still intact, giving him a remarkably lifelike appearance. His hair had been cropped so short that it was almost entirely concealed beneath his cap, while approximately 1 mm (0.039 in) of beard growth suggested that he had not shaved on the day of his death.

Although the acidic, oxygen-poor environment of the bog had dissolved much of his skeleton, it preserved many of his soft tissues and several internal organs, including his heart, lungs and liver.

== Body and health ==
=== Physical characteristics ===
Tollund Man was approximately 30 to 40 years old when he died. His preserved body measured 161 cm (5 ft 3 in), although he is estimated to have stood approximately 164–167 cm (5 ft 5 in – 5 ft 6 in) tall in life. His feet corresponded to a modern European shoe size of approximately 41.

=== Feet and skin ===
Examination of Tollund Man's feet revealed evidence that he had walked both barefoot and in footwear. Scars on the soles indicate that he sustained cuts during his lifetime, including injuries sufficiently deep to leave visible marks after healing.

In 2017, French forensic anthropologist Philippe Charlier, Danish museum director Ole Nielsen and American dermatologist Ethan J. Lowenstein published a study of skin lesions on his feet. They identified two small raised lesions, each approximately 2 mm (0.079 in) across, consistent with plantar warts, and a scar measuring approximately 4 mm (0.16 in) on the sole of his right foot, consistent with a healed cut. The researchers cautioned that a definitive diagnosis of the skin lesions was not possible from the preserved remains.

=== Intestinal parasites ===
A 2021 analysis of Tollund Man's preserved intestinal contents identified eggs from three types of intestinal parasites: whipworm (Trichuris), tapeworm (Taenia) and roundworm (Ascaris). The findings established that he carried intestinal parasites at the time of his death, although the researchers could not determine whether the infections had caused symptoms during his lifetime.

== Scientific study ==
=== Initial examination ===
On 31 May 1950, about three weeks after his discovery, Tollund Man was taken to Bispebjerg Hospital in Copenhagen for medical examination by physicians Christian Bastrup and Bjovulf Vimtrup. X-rays showed that his brain remained recognisable although it had shrunk during preservation in the bog, while the vertebrae of his neck showed no fractures.

The physicians also examined Tollund Man's internal organs. Although pressure from the surrounding peat had flattened many of the tissues, his heart, lungs, liver and digestive tract remained sufficiently well preserved for examination. Samples of the digestive contents were retained for future study.

Both feet and the right thumb were placed in formalin after the examination. Twenty-six years later, in 1976, the Danish police recorded a usable fingerprint from the preserved thumb, making it one of the oldest fingerprints obtained from human remains.

=== Dating ===
Radiocarbon dating placed Tollund Man's death between 405 and 380 BCE, during the Pre-Roman Iron Age in Scandinavia. His age at death has been estimated at approximately 40 years.

=== Mobility and geographic origin ===
Researchers used strontium isotope analysis to investigate Tollund Man's movements during the final year of his life. Samples were taken from his femur, which preserved a longer-term chemical record, and from his short hair, which recorded only the final months before his death. Because his hair had been cut shortly before he died, the analysis covered approximately the last year of his life.

The strontium isotope ratios differed only slightly between the hair and femur samples, indicating that Tollund Man remained within the region of present-day Denmark during his final year. The results also suggested that he travelled at least 32 kilometres (20 miles) during the final six months before his death.

=== Last meal ===
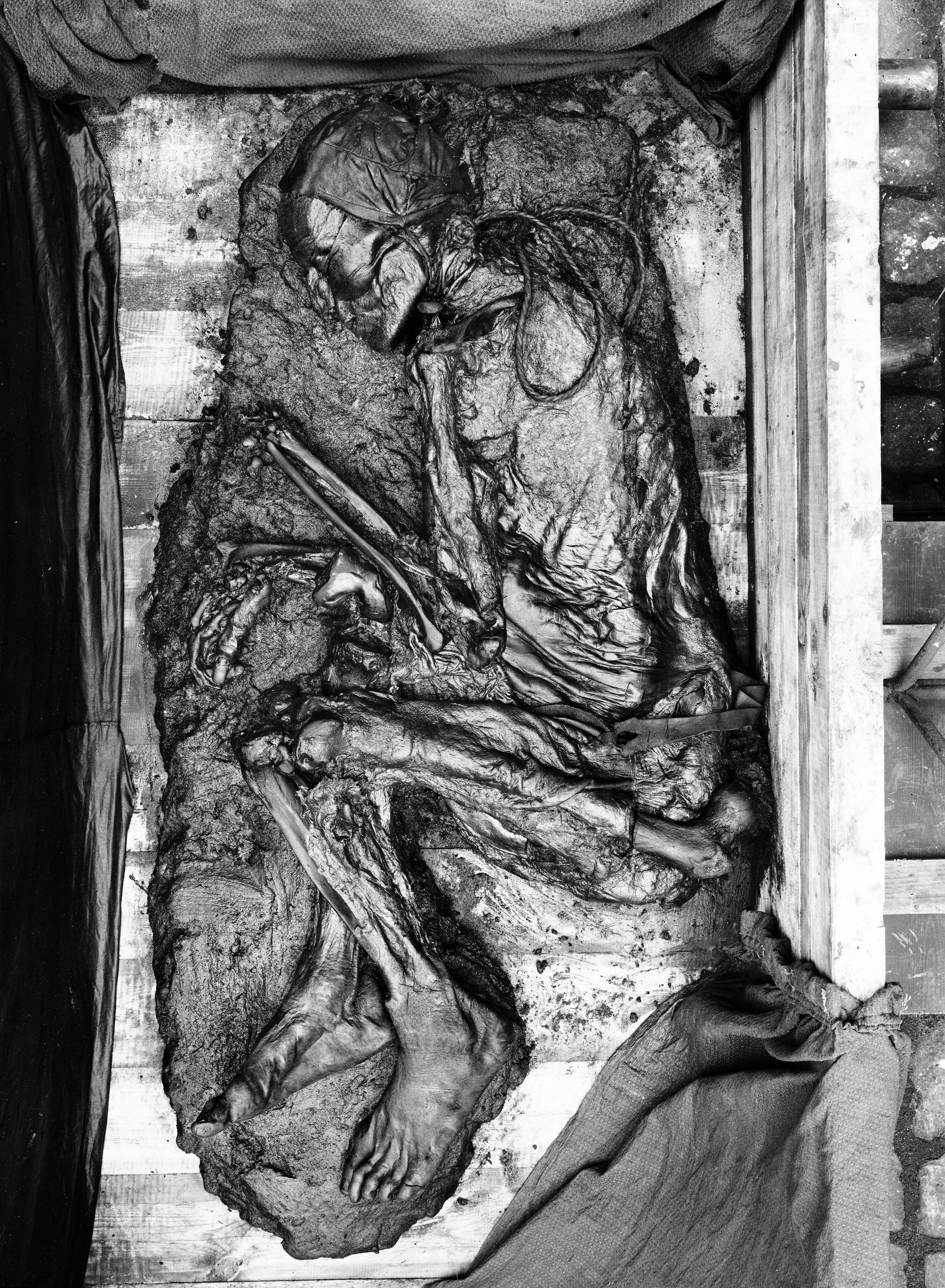
Tollund Man's remains shortly after his discovery in 1950

During the initial post-mortem examination, physicians examined the contents of Tollund Man's stomach and intestines. From the stage of digestion, they concluded that he had eaten approximately 12 to 24 hours before his death.

More than 70 years later, in 2021, researchers re-examined the preserved samples using analyses of plant remains, pollen, other microscopic remains, steroid biomarkers and proteins. They concluded that Tollund Man's final meal was a thick porridge made principally from six-rowed barley, pale persicaria seeds and flax, together with smaller quantities of other cultivated and wild plants. Protein analysis also indicated that fish formed part of the meal.

The preserved digestive contents contained remains from approximately 40 identifiable plant species. Although barley formed the principal ingredient, researchers also identified small quantities of corn spurrey, false flax, knotgrass and several plants associated with wetland environments.

The meal also contained weed seeds, grains of sand and other threshing waste that would normally have been removed during the final cleaning of harvested barley. Similar material has been identified in the digestive tracts of other bog bodies, but the researchers could not determine whether its presence reflected deliberate ritual practice, ordinary food preparation or accidental contamination.

Tollund Man carried intestinal parasites at the time of his death. Together with the stage of digestion recorded during the initial examination, the findings supported the conclusion that he had eaten his final meal approximately 12 to 24 hours before his death.

== Cause of death ==
Tollund Man died by hanging between 405 and 380 BCE. When his body was discovered on 8 May 1950, a plaited hide noose remained tightly fastened around his neck, leaving deep furrows beneath his chin and along the sides of his neck. An autopsy conducted later that year concluded that he had been hanged rather than strangled. More than 50 years later, a forensic re-examination, including CT scanning, reached the same conclusion. Although the bones of his neck remained intact, the scans showed that his tongue was distended, a finding consistent with death by hanging.

Archaeologists continue to debate why Tollund Man was killed. Some scholars argue that he died as part of a ritual sacrifice, citing the careful arrangement of his body, his closed eyes and mouth, and the contents of his last meal. Others interpret his death as a judicial execution, noting that the Roman historian Tacitus described Germanic tribes burying traitors beneath piles of sticks. No direct archaeological evidence identifies why he was killed, and more than two millennia after his death, the available evidence has not allowed either interpretation to be confirmed conclusively.

== Preservation and display ==
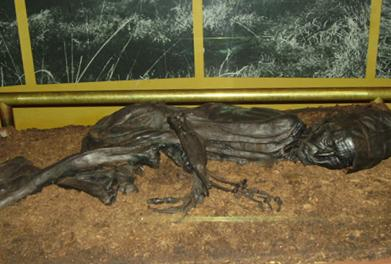
Tollund Man on display at Museum Silkeborg, with his original preserved head attached to a reconstructed body.

=== Conservation of the head ===
When Tollund Man was removed from the peat in 1950, conservators faced the problem of preserving remains that had survived for more than 2,000 years in a waterlogged environment. Exposure to air could cause the tissues to dry, shrink and deteriorate. Earlier preservation methods, including nineteenth-century attempts to smoke bog bodies like meat, had slowed decomposition but caused considerable shrinkage and loss of detail.

Silkeborg Museum requested conservation of the entire body, but Therkel Mathiassen, senior curator at the National Museum of Denmark in Copenhagen, opposed the proposal. He considered displaying a partially decomposed human body too macabre, and no established method existed for preserving a complete bog body. Instead, conservators concentrated on the exceptionally well-preserved head.

Following the autopsy at Bispebjerg Hospital in Copenhagen, conservators Børge Brorson Christensen and Knud Thorvildsen developed a treatment to replace the water within the head's tissues with wax. The head was immersed successively in alcohol, toluene and liquid paraffin before being placed in warm beeswax. Each stage prepared the tissues for the next, allowing the wax to penetrate and prevent them from collapsing as they dried.

After approximately six months, the head was removed from the wax shortly before Christmas 1951. Once cooled and cleaned, its facial features remained intact, although some shrinkage had occurred. It returned to Silkeborg in June 1952, where it was exhibited alongside the cap, noose and belt recovered with the body.

=== Loss of the original body ===
The remainder of Tollund Man's body was divided into several parts following the autopsy. His feet and right thumb were preserved, but the untreated portions dried out and shrank, leaving skeletal remains and some dried soft tissue.

The separated remains were subsequently dispersed among different institutions. During the 1980s, Silkeborg Museum director Christian Fischer began searching for the missing body parts, eventually locating remains at the National Museum of Denmark and the Anatomical Institute. The internal organs and right big toe remained unaccounted for.

On 17 October 2016, Birte Brorson Christensen, daughter of conservator Børge Brorson Christensen, contacted Museum Silkeborg to report that the missing toe had remained in her family's possession.

She recalled that her father had kept one of Tollund Man's feet in a glass container of blue liquid on his desk while researching preservation methods. He had apparently removed the toe to investigate the treatment and subsequently kept it among his belongings. She also recalled that he carried the toe and fragments of the Skuldelev Viking ships in his dressing-gown pocket, sometimes placing them on the table while eating.

After his death, the specimen remained with his widow and was rediscovered when her possessions were cleared following her death, more than six decades after Tollund Man's discovery. The toe was returned to Museum Silkeborg, where computed tomography (CT) scans confirmed that it belonged to his preserved right foot and had been separated after conservation.

The internal organs have not been recovered, although the surviving skeletal remains and dried soft tissues remain available for scientific examination.

=== Reconstruction and display ===
In 1986, Museum Silkeborg reconstructed Tollund Man's body using photographs taken during the original excavation. A wax model was used to produce a silicone rubber mould, from which the replacement body was cast in epoxy resin.

As displayed today at Museum Silkeborg in Silkeborg, Denmark, the original preserved head is attached to the reconstructed body, recreating his appearance when he was discovered in 1950.

== Other bodies ==
In Denmark, more than 500 bog bodies and skeletal remains dating to the Iron Age have been recovered. Specimens from Jutland include the relatively well-preserved Borremose bodies, Huldremose Woman, and Grauballe Man, on display at Moesgaard Museum near Aarhus, and the similarly-conserved Haraldskær Woman. Approximately 30 of these bog bodies are housed and/or displayed in Danish museums for continued research.

== In popular culture ==
Nobel Prize-winning Irish poet Seamus Heaney wrote a series of poems inspired by P. V. Glob's study of the mummified Iron Age bodies found in Jutland's peat bogs, finding contemporary political relevance in the relics of the ritualistic killings. Heaney's poem "The Tollund Man", published in his Wintering Out collection, compares the ritual sacrifice to those who died in the sectarian violence of "the Troubles". Heaney wrote an excerpt from the poem in the Tollund Man exhibit's guest book in 1973.

British author Margaret Drabble, in her 1989 novel A Natural Curiosity, uses her characters' obsession with the Tollund Man to provide a satirical criticism of Margaret Thatcher's modern England.

Tollund Man is featured in several songs: "Tollund Man" (1995) by the American folk band The Mountain Goats and "Curse of the Tollund Man" (2004) by the English rock band The Darkness.

Tollund Man was mentioned in the episode "Mummy in the Maze" of the American television series Bones and was also mentioned in the 2016 film Sacrifice in which a bog body was found in the Shetland Islands.

He is the subject of the novel Meet Me at the Museum by Anne Youngson in which the main characters bond through a shared fascination with the Tollund Man.

== See also ==
- List of bog bodies

== General sources ==
- Glob, P. V. (2004) [1969]. The Bog People: Iron-Age Man Preserved. Translated by Rupert Bruce-Mitford. New York: New York Review Books. ISBN 1-59017-090-3. Translated from the Danish original: Mosefolket: Jernalderens Mennesker bevaret i 2000 År, 1965. The Wikipedia article: The Bog People.
