= The Gates of Ivory =

Novel by Margaret Drabble

- First edition (publ. Viking)
- Author: Margaret Drabble
- Publisher: Viking Books
- Publication date: 1991
- ISBN: 978-0-670-84270-4

The Gates of Ivory is a 1991 novel by novelist Margaret Drabble. The novel is the third in a series of novels, following The Radiant Way and A Natural Curiosity. The novel continues the stories of several middle aged intellectuals introduced in the last two novels. The novel also introduces a new character, Stephen Cox who is loosely based on J.G. Farrell.

== Style ==
The novel includes metafiction reflecting on the choices Drabble made while writing the novel. The novel also includes a bibliography referencing a number of works which provide background and connections for the rest of the novel.

The novel's narratives that rotate between both the present and flashbacks narratives from each of the main characters. The novel also introduces characters from The Needle's Eye.

== Reviews ==
New York Times reviewer Linda Simon was disappointed with the novel, writing "intellectually stimulating and, as we might expect from Ms. Drabble, very smart. But ideas do not make a novel. Characters do." Publishers Weekly describes the novel as "command[ing] awe even as [Drabble's] subject matter rouses immeasurable stores of pity and terror."
