= The Peppered Moth =

Margaret Drabble novel

- First UK edition
- Author: Margaret Drabble
- Language: English
- Genre: Domestic fictionalized biography
- Published: 2000
- Publisher: Viking Press (UK); Harcourt (US)
- Publication place: United Kingdom
- Pages: 369
- ISBN: 9780151005215
- OCLC: 45195664

The Peppered Moth is a 2000 novel by English writer Margaret Drabble; it is her fourteenth published novel. The novel follows the fictional experiences of three generations of women within one family, and contains several elements that are loosely based on Drabble's own biographical experience.

The novel received mixed reviews, with some authors noting the relative weakness of Drabble's blending of fictional and biographical elements.

== Background ==
Drabble, in the afterword for the novel, describes it as a loose adaptation of her mother's life. Publishers Weekly described the fictional representation of her mother, the protagonist Bessie Bawtry, as very unsympathetic and "thinly veiled". When discussing the investigation of matrilineal traits in the novel, critic Yi-Lin Yu describes the relationship between Drabble and the fictional representation of her mother as fraught. In part, the poor representation has a lot to do with the difficulty Drabble had in evoking her mother: she originally wrote the novel, upon urging of friends after her mother's death and in the afterword, she writes that her mother "was a highly intelligent, angry, deeply disappointed and manipulative woman. I am not sure if I have been able to find a tone in which to create or describe her." When reviewing the book, critic Nora Foster Stovel, questioned whether Drabble successfully created fiction, or whether the novel is more biography; she highlights Drabble's own doubts: "Maybe I should have tried to write a factual memoir of her life, but I have written this instead." Stovel also notes that A.S. Byatt was not very happy with her sister's representation of their mother.

Other characters bear significant relationship to parts of Drabble's life: for instance, Drabble described the scientist that opens the prologue, Dr. Robert Hawthorn, as modelled after an encounter with genetics research, Bryan Sykes at Oxford. However, Drabble was careful to emphasise that, other than her mother, none of the character's family members were based on her real family (for example, sister A. S. Byatt or daughter Rebecca Swift).

== Style ==
The novel frequently juxtaposes fictional and historical narrative styles. However, this approach isn't always regarded as very successful; as critic Kelly McWilliam describes in M/C Reviews, "the segments recreated through various family histories (in photographs and letters, for example) and fiction, are somewhat maladroit and conspicuous."

== Themes ==
One of the central concerns in the novel is an exploration of the transmission of knowledge, genetics, and emotions through matrilineality. In particular, by focusing on mitochondrial DNA both in the prologue and the subsequent discussion of scientific and archaeological topics throughout the novel, Drabble deliberately excludes the fatherly line from the narrative. Biological connection through this DNA, becomes a symbolic stand in for the "transmission of female behavioral patterns from one generation to the next". The women in the novels try to break away from such cycles, such as those found in romantic relationships; but each woman becomes caught in this biological deterministic pattern. Reviewer Nora Foster Stovel notes that this focus on inherited traits along family lines grows out of an earlier desire to explore "inherited depression in a Midlands family" that Drabble expressed after writing The Radiant Way.

== Reception ==
Publishers Weekly noted that "One scarcely recognises Drabble's (The Witch of Exmoor, etc.) customary satirical verve". Similarly, the M/C Review, noted the relative ineffectiveness of the novels execution: "Overall, The Peppered Moth is a fascinating mixture of personal history threaded through a fictional narrative. While it is not, however, always a successful blend, it is inarguably an interesting one."
