= Passion (emotion) =

Feeling of intense enthusiasm towards or compelling desire for someone or something

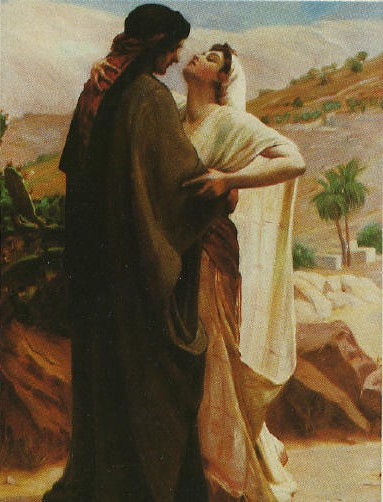
Frederick Goodall's Passionate Encounter

Passion (Greek πάσχω "to suffer, to be acted on" and Late Latin (chiefly Christian) passio "passion; suffering") denotes strong and intractable or barely controllable emotion or inclination with respect to a particular person or thing. Passion can range from eager interest in, or admiration for, an idea, proposal, or cause; to enthusiastic enjoyment of an interest or activity; to strong attraction, excitement, or emotion towards a person. It is particularly used in the context of romance or sexual desire, though it generally implies a deeper or more encompassing emotion than that implied by the term lust, often incorporating ideas of ecstasy or suffering.

Denis Diderot (1713–1784) describes passions as

"penchants, inclinations, desires and aversions carried to a certain degree of intensity, combined with an indistinct sensation of pleasure or pain, occasioned or accompanied by some irregular movement of the blood and animal spirits, are what we call passions. They can be so strong as to inhibit all practice of personal freedom, a state in which the soul is in some sense rendered passive; whence the name passions. This inclination or so-called disposition of the soul, is born of the opinion we hold that a great good or a great evil is contained in an object which in and of itself arouses passion".

Diderot further breaks down pleasure and pain, which he sees as the guiding principles of passion, into four major categories:

1. Pleasures and pains of the senses
2. Pleasures of the mind or of the imagination
3. Our perfection or our imperfection of virtues or vices
4. Pleasures and pains in the happiness or misfortunes of others

Modern pop-psychologies and employers tend to favor and even encourage the expression of a "passion"; previous generations sometimes expressed more nuanced viewpoints.

== Emotion ==
The standard definition for emotion is a "Natural instinctive state of mind deriving from one's circumstances, mood, or relationships with others". William James describes emotions as "corporeal reverberations such as surprise, curiosity, rapture, fear, anger, lust, greed and the like." These are all feelings that affect our mental perception. Our body is placed into this latter state, which is caused by one's mental affection. This state gives signals to our body which cause bodily expressions.

The philosopher Robert Solomon developed his own theory and definition of emotion. His view is that emotion is not a bodily state, but instead a type of judgment. "It is necessary that we choose our emotions, in much the same way that we choose our actions" With regard to the relationship between emotion and our rational will, Solomon believes that people are responsible for their emotions. Emotions are rational and purposive, just as actions are. "We choose an emotion much as we choose a course of action." Recent studies have placed emotions to be a physiological disturbance. William James takes such consciousness of emotion to be not a choice but a physical occurrence rather than a disturbance. It is an occurrence that happens outside of our control, and our bodies are just affected by these emotions. We produce these actions based on the instinctive state that these feelings lead us towards.

This concept of emotion was derived from passion. Emotions were created as a category within passion.

== Reason ==
In his wake, Stoics like Epictetus emphasized that "the most important and especially pressing field of study is that which has to do with the stronger emotions...sorrows, lamentations, envies...passions which make it impossible for us even to listen to reason". The Stoic tradition still lay behind Hamlet's plea to "Give me that man That is not passion's slave, and I will wear him In my heart's core", or Erasmus's lament that "Jupiter has bestowed far more passion than reason – you could calculate the ratio as 24 to one". It was only with the Romantic movement that a valorisation of passion over reason took hold in the Western tradition: "the more Passion there is, the better the Poetry".

The recent concerns of emotional intelligence have been to find a synthesis of the two forces—something that "turns the old understanding of the tension between reason and feeling on its head: it is not that we want to do away with emotion and put reason in its place, as Erasmus had it, but instead find the intelligent balance of the two".

=== "Descartes' Error" ===
Antonio Damasio studied what ensued when something "severed ties between the lower centres of the emotional brain...and the thinking abilities of the neocortex". He found that while "emotions and feelings can cause havoc in the processes of reasoning...the absence of emotion and feeling is no less damaging"; and was led to "the counter-intuitive position that feelings are typically indispensable for rational decisions". The passions, he concluded, "have a say on how the rest of the brain and cognition go about their business. Their influence is immense...[providing] a frame of reference – as opposed to Descartes' error...the Cartesian idea of a disembodied mind".

== In marriage ==
A tension or dialectic between marriage and passion can be traced back in Western society at least as far as the Middle Ages, and the emergence of the cult of courtly love. Denis de Rougemont has argued that 'since its origins in the twelfth century, passionate love was constituted in opposition to marriage'. Stacey Oliker writes that while "Puritanism prepared the ground for a marital love ideology by prescribing love in marriage", only from the eighteenth century has "romantic love ideology resolved the Puritan antagonism between passion and reason" in a marital context.

== Intellectual passions ==
George Bernard Shaw "insists that there are passions far more exciting than the physical ones ... 'intellectual passion, mathematical passion, passion for discovery and exploration: the mightiest of all passions'". His contemporary, Sigmund Freud, argued for a continuity (not a contrast) between the two, physical and intellectual, and commended the way Leonardo da Vinci "had energetically sublimated his sexual passions into the passion for independent scientific research".

== As a motivation in an occupation ==
There are different reasons individuals are motivated in an occupation. These may include a passion for the occupation, for a firm, or for an activity. When Canadian managers or professionals score as passionate about their occupation they tend to be less obsessive about their behavior while on their job, resulting in more work being done and more work satisfaction. These same individuals have higher levels of psychological well-being. When people genuinely enjoy their profession and are motivated by their passion, they tend to be more satisfied with their work and more psychologically healthy. When managers or professionals are unsatisfied with their profession they tend to also be dissatisfied with their family relationships and to experience psychological distress. Other reasons people are more satisfied when they are motivated by their passion for their occupation include the effects of intrinsic and external motivations. When Canadian managers or professionals do a job to satisfy others, they tend to have lower levels of satisfaction and psychological health. Also, these same individuals have shown they are motivated by several beliefs and fears concerning other people. Some individuals may work extreme hours out of passion for the occupation. This may also put a strain on family relationships and friendships. Work–life balance is hard to achieve.

=== Work enjoyment vs. inner pressures ===
There are different components that qualify as reasons for considering an individual as a workaholic. Burke & Fiksenbaum refer to Spence and Robbins (1992) by stating two of the three workaholism components that are used to measure workaholism. These include feeling driven to work because of inner pressure and work enjoyment. Both of these affect an individual differently and each has different outcomes. To begin, work enjoyment brings about more positive work outcomes and is unrelated to health indicators. Inner pressure, on the other hand, is negatively related with work outcomes and has been related negatively to measures of psychological health. Burke & Fiksenbaum make a reference to Graves et al. (2006) when examining work enjoyment and inner pressures. Work enjoyment and inner pressure were tested with performance ratings. The former was positively related to performance ratings while the latter interfered with the performance-enhancing aspects of work enjoyment. Burke & Fiksenbaum refer to Virick and Baruch (2007) when explaining how these two workaholism components affect life satisfaction. Not surprisingly, inner pressure lowered the balance between work-life and life satisfaction but enhanced people's performance at their occupation, whereas work enjoyment led to a positive balance between the two. Again, when managers and professionals are passionate about their occupation and put in many hours, they then become concerned that their occupation will satisfy personal relationships and the balance must then be found according to the importance levels of the individual.

==== Motivation and outcomes ====
The researchers indicate different patterns of correlations between these two components. These patterns include antecedents and consequences. The two components offer unique motivations or orientations to work which result in its effects on work and well-being. Inner pressures will hinder performance while work enjoyment will smooth performance. Inner pressures of workaholism have characteristics such as persistence, rigidity, perfectionism, and heightened levels of job stress. This component is also associated with working harder, not smarter. On a more positive note, individuals who enjoy their work will have higher levels of performance for several reasons. These include creativity, trust in their colleagues, and reducing levels of stress.

==== Good and bad workaholics ====
Burke and Fiksenbaum refer to Schaufeli, Taris, and Bakker (2007) when they made a distinction between an individual good workaholics and bad workaholics. A good workaholic will score higher on measures of work engagement and a bad workaholic will score higher on measures of burnout. They (mentioned above) also suggest why this is – some individuals work because they are satisfied, engaged, and challenged and to prove a point. On the other hand, the opposite kind work hard because they are addicted to work; they see that the occupation makes a contribution to finding an identity and purpose.

==== Desire in an occupation ====
Passion and desire go hand in hand, especially as a motivation. Linstead & Brewis refer to Merriam-Webster to say that passion is an "intense, driving, or overmastering feeling or conviction". This suggests that passion is a very intense emotion, but can be positive or negative. Negatively, it may be unpleasant at times. It could involve pain and has obsessive forms that can destroy the self and even others. In an occupation, when an individual is very passionate about their job, they may be so wrapped up in work that they cause pain to their loved ones by focusing more on their job than on their friendships and relationships. This is a constant battle of balance that is difficult to achieve and only an individual can decide where that line lies. Passion is connected to the concept of desire. In fact, they are inseparable, according to a (mostly western) way of thinking related to Plato, Aristotle, and Augustine. These two concepts cause individuals to reach out for something, or even someone. They both can either be creative or destructive and this dark side can very well be dangerous to the self or to others.

== As a motivation for hobbies ==
Hobbies require a certain level of passion in order to continue engaging in the hobby. Singers, athletes, dancers, artists, and many others describe their emotion for their hobby as a passion. Although this might be the emotion they are feeling, passion is serving as a motivation for them to continue their hobby. Recently there has been a model to explain different types of passion that contribute to engaging in an activity.

=== Dualistic model ===
The dualistic model of passion was formulated by the psychologist Robert Vallerand. According to researchers who have tested this model, "A dualistic model in which passion is defined as a strong inclination or desire toward a self-defining activity that one likes (or even loves), that one finds important (high valuation), and in which one invests time and energy." It is proposed that there exist two types of passion. The first type of passion is harmonious passion.

"A harmonious passion refers to a strong desire to engage in the activity that remains under the person's control." This is mostly obtained when the person views their activity as part of their identity. Furthermore, once an activity is part of the person's identity then the motivation to continue the specific hobby is even stronger. The harmony obtained with this passion is conceived when the person is able both to freely engage in or to stop the hobby. It is not so much that the person is forced to continue this hobby, but on his or her own free will is able to engage in it. For example, if a girl loves to play volleyball, but she has a project due the next day and her friends invite her to play, she should be able to say "no" on the basis of her own free will.

The second kind of passion in the dualistic model is obsessive passion, being the opposite of harmonious passion. This type has a strong desire to engage in the activity, but it is not under the person's own control and he or she is forced to engage in the hobby. This type of passion has a negative effect on a person where they could feel they need to engage in their hobby to continue, for example, interpersonal relationships, or "fit in" with the crowd. To change the above example, if the girl has an obsessive passion towards volleyball and she is asked to play with her friends, she will likely say "yes" even though she needs to finish her project for the next day.

==== Intrinsic motivation ====
Since passion can be a type of motivation in hobbies then assessing intrinsic motivation is appropriate. Intrinsic motivation helps define these types of passion. Passion naturally helps the needs or desires that motivate a person to some particular action or behavior. Certain abilities and hobbies can be developed early and the innate motivation is also something that comes early in life. Although someone might know how to engage in a hobby, this does not necessarily mean they are motivated to do it. Christine Robinson makes the point in her article that "knowledge of your innate motivation can help guide action toward what will be fulfilling". Feeling satisfied and fulfilled builds the passion for the hobby to continue a person's happiness.

== Fictional examples ==
In Margaret Drabble's The Realms of Gold, the hero flies hundreds of miles to reunite with the heroine, only to miss her by 24 hours – leaving the onlookers "wondering what grand passion could have brought him so far...a quixotic look about him, a look of harassed desperation". When the couple do finally reunite, however, the heroine is less than impressed. "'If you ask me, it was a very childish gesture. You're not twenty-one now, you know'. 'No, I know. It was my last fling'".

In Alberto Moravia's 1934, the revolutionary double-agent, faced with the girl he is betraying, "was seized by violent desire...he never took his eyes off my bosom...I believe those two dark spots at the end of my breasts were enough to make him forget tsarism, revolution, political faith, ideology, and betrayal".

== See also ==
- Crime of passion
- Eros
- Eroticism
- Infatuation
- Limerence
- Affection
- Attraction
- Courtly love
- Love
- Passionate and companionate love
- Passions (philosophy)
- Pathos
- Romantic love
- Enthusiasm
- Sympathy
- Zest (positive psychology)
