= Middle Ground =

Middle Ground or middle ground may refer to:

== Places ==
- Middle Ground (New Rochelle), a large submerged reef in the city of New Rochelle, New York, United States
- Middle Ground (India), an island within Mumbai Harbour, India
- An area of the Midwestern United States called the "Middle Ground" due to the dispute between British settlers and Native Americans over to whom the land should belong

== Arts and entertainment ==
- The Middle Ground, a 1980 novel by Margaret Drabble
- "Middle Ground" (The Good Doctor), a 2018 television episode
- "Middle Ground" (The Wire), a 2004 television episode
- Middle Ground, a 2024 album by Covey
- "Middle Ground" (song), a 2023 song by Maroon 5

== Other ==
- Middleground (1947–1972), an American Thoroughbred racehorse
- Golden mean (philosophy), a desirable "middle ground" between two extremes.
- Argument to moderation, a logical fallacy that states that the "middle ground" is always correct
- Centrism
