= Seven Women (disambiguation) =

Seven Women or 7 Women is a 1966 film drama.

Seven Women may also refer to:

- Seven Women, a 1929 novel by William M. John
- Seven Women (1944 film), an Argentine drama film
- Seven Women (1953 film), a Mexican drama film
- A Casa das Sete Mulheres (English title: Seven Women), a 2003 Brazilian miniseries

== See also ==
- Seven Women from Hell, a 1961 war drama
- Seven Vengeful Women, a 1966 western film
- Seven (play), a documentary play written by seven women playwrights
- Seven Sisters (disambiguation)
