= Polygonum glandulosum =

Polygonum glandulosum is a scientific name that has been published four times and is the botanical synonym of two species of plant:

- Persicaria hydropiper, synonym published in 1804 by Jean Louis Marie Poiret (1755–1834)
- Persicaria hydropiper, synonym published in 1964 by Gorti Venkata Subba Rao (1928–2013)
- Persicaria lapathifolia, synonym published in 1810 by Robert Brown (1773–1858)
- Persicaria lapathifolia, synonym published in 1864 by Pál Kitaibel (1757–1817)
