= Seven Sisters, England =

Seven Sisters, England may refer to:

- Seven Sisters, Sussex: a group of chalk cliffs
- Seven Sisters, London: an area of north London in the London Borough of Haringey, served by Seven Sisters station

== See also ==
- Seven Sisters (disambiguation)
