= The Lady from the Sea (disambiguation) =

The Lady from the Sea is a play written in 1888 by Henrik Ibsen.

The Lady from the Sea or Lady from the Sea may also refer to:

- The Lady from the Sea (1929 film), by Castleton Knight
- The Lady from the Sea (1961 film), by William Sterling
- The Lady from the Sea, a 1911 film by Lucius J. Henderson
- The Lady from the Sea, a 1916 film by Raymond B. West
- The Lady from the Sea, a 1974 film by Basil Coleman
- "The Lady from the Sea" (Sunday Night Theatre), a 1953 episode
- Mermaid, a 1896 painting by Edvard Munch sometimes called Lady from the Sea

== See also ==
- Lady (disambiguation)
- Sea (disambiguation)
- The Sea Lady, a 1902 novel by H. G. Wells
- The Sea Lady (Drabble novel), a 2006 novel by Margaret Drabble
- Our Lady of the Sea, a Croatian ship
- A Woman of the Sea, an unreleased film by Josef von Sternberg produced in 1926
- La Dama del mar, a 1954 film by Mario Soffici
