= Borremose Woman =

Iron Age bog body found in Denmark

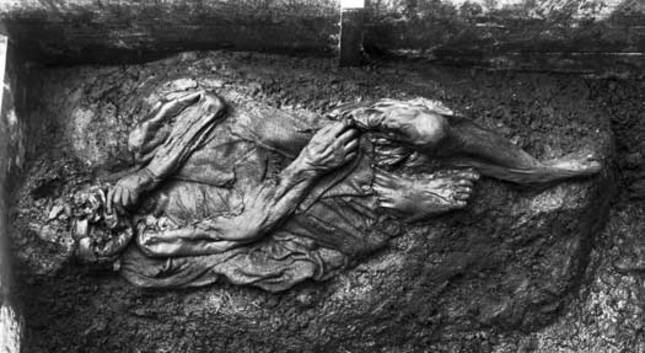
- Borremose Woman around the time of her discovery
- Died: c. 770 BCE; Borremose, Himmerland, Denmark
- Body discovered: 1948, Borremose, Himmerland, Denmark
- Known for: Iron Age bog body from Borremose, Denmark

Borremose Woman, also known as Borremose III, is a bog body of an adult woman discovered in 1948 in the Borremose peat bog in Himmerland, Denmark. She was the third of three human bodies recovered from the bog between 1946 and 1948, and was found approximately 400 metres (1,300 ft) south of the location where Borremose Man had been discovered two years earlier.

Borremose Woman was approximately 20 to 35 years old when she died. Radiocarbon dating has placed her death at approximately 770 BCE. Her body was discovered lying face down and wrapped in a rectangular woolen twill textile. Although her skull and face were badly damaged when recovered, later examination determined that much of this damage had occurred after death. Her cause of death remains unknown.

== Discovery ==
The individual now known as Borremose Woman, or Borremose III, was discovered during peat cutting in the summer of 1948 at Borremose, a peat bog near Aars in Himmerland, Denmark. She was found approximately 400 metres (1,300 ft) south of the location where Borremose Man had been discovered in 1946.

Rather than removing Borremose Woman immediately from the bog, the excavators recovered her together with the surrounding peat. The block containing her remains was placed in a specially constructed box and transported to the National Museum of Denmark in Copenhagen, where it could be excavated and examined under controlled conditions.

== Condition ==
When Borremose Woman was recovered in 1948, preservation varied considerably across her body. Her arms and legs had survived relatively well, while the torso had deteriorated more extensively. Her skin had become brown and her hair reddish-brown during burial in the peat. The outer layer of skin had separated from the body, as had her nails. Six detached nails were recovered from the peat around her.

Her head was badly damaged. Part of the scalp and hair on one side had been cut away during peat cutting. The skull and face were extensively crushed. Later examination showed that her bones had lost most of their mineral content and had shrunk considerably. Examination of the reconstructed skull indicated that the extensive cranial damage had occurred after death.

Most of her teeth had fallen from their sockets after death, although they were recovered with the remains. Her neck was also poorly preserved, leaving too little soft tissue for investigators to determine reliably whether she had been hanged or strangled.

The torso was less well preserved, but her breasts remained recognizable. The organs of the abdomen had deteriorated too extensively for detailed examination and investigators identified no fetal remains.

== Clothing and associated items ==
Borremose Woman was wrapped in a rectangular twill textile made from wool, measuring approximately 180 by 120 centimetres (5.9 ft × 3.9 ft). The textile preserved all four original weaving borders, including both selvages and the starting and finishing edges. Fringes about 2 centimetres (0.79 in) long survived along each short end of the cloth.

The cloth was folded across its short side, with the fringes facing downwards, before being wrapped around her body beneath the arms. Two groups of holes near the fold, together with the remains of a leather thong, allowed archaeologists to reconstruct how the garment had originally been fastened around the waist, which measured approximately 70–75 cm.

== Scientific study ==
=== Forensic examination ===
In 1977, nearly three decades after Borremose Woman's discovery, forensic pathologists S. Ry Andersen and Preben Geertinger carried out a detailed examination with specialists from several fields.

X-ray examination of her surviving skeleton suggested a height of about 143 cm (4 ft 8 in), although Andersen and Geertinger cautioned that shrinkage of the bones meant she was probably taller in life.

About 65 samples were taken from surviving skin and remnants of internal organs. Thousands of thin tissue sections were examined using staining methods and electron microscopy. Connective tissue and hair follicles remained recognizable, while sphagnum moss had penetrated some deeper layers of the preserved skin.

=== Radiocarbon dating ===
Early radiocarbon dating of remnants of Borremose Woman's heart and lungs produced a date of approximately 770 ± 100 BCE. The surrounding sphagnum peat produced a result about 80 years younger.

Later research revised the chronology of the Borremose finds, placing Borremose Man (Borremose I), Borremose II and Borremose Woman (Borremose III) within a calibrated range of 483–95 BCE, a span of nearly four centuries.

=== CT examination and age estimation ===
In 2011, more than 60 years after her discovery, researchers Chiara Villa, Maria Møller Rasmussen and Niels Lynnerup used computed tomography (CT) to investigate Borremose Woman's age at death without disturbing her remains. CT images were used to create three-dimensional models of parts of her skeleton.

Only the cranium, left ribs and right auricular surface, the joint surface of the pelvis next to the sacrum, could be reconstructed successfully. Several methods of age estimation produced widely differing results: 27–51 years from skull sutures, 20–32 years from a rib, 25–73 years from the pelvic joint surface, and 16–24 years using a method developed for medical images.

The researchers cautioned that preservation affected the results. Mineral loss made some bones difficult to distinguish, connective tissue could obscure their outlines, and CT image thickness could reduce anatomical detail. The study therefore did not establish a single precise age at death.

== Cause of death ==
Borremose Woman's cause of death remains unknown. During a forensic examination in 1977, investigators found that the severe damage to her skull and face had occurred after death and therefore did not show how she had died.

Part of her scalp and hair had also been damaged. Investigators attributed this to peat cutting during her recovery in 1948 rather than to an injury she received while alive.

Her neck was too poorly preserved for investigators to determine whether she had been hanged or strangled. They also could not determine whether her death was a homicide, suicide, accident, or the result of natural causes.

== See also ==
- List of Danish bog bodies
