= A Touch of Love (1969 film) =

1969 film by Waris Hussein

- Theatrical release poster
- Directed by: Waris Hussein
- Screenplay by: Margaret Drabble
- Based on: The Millstone; 1965 novel by Margaret Drabble
- Produced by: Max Rosenberg; Milton Subotsky
- Starring: Sandy Dennis; Ian McKellen; Michael Coles; John Standing; Eleanor Bron
- Cinematography: Peter Suschitzky
- Edited by: Bill Blunden
- Music by: Michael Dress
- Production companies: Amicus Productions; Palomar Pictures International
- Distributed by: British Lion Films (UK); Columbia Pictures (USA)
- Release dates: June 1969 (Berlin); September 1969 (United Kingdom)
- Running time: 107 minutes
- Country: United Kingdom
- Language: English
- Budget: £304,512

A Touch of Love (also known as Thank You All Very Much and The Millstone) is a 1969 British drama film directed by Waris Hussein and adapted by Margaret Drabble from her novel The Millstone (1965). The film stars Sandy Dennis, Ian McKellen, Michael Coles, John Standing and Eleanor Bron. The movie was released in the United States and other countries by Columbia Pictures as Thank You All Very Much.

== Plot ==
Rosamund Stacey, a young bookish woman in London society, spends her days working on her dissertation in the British Museum and her nights avoiding the sexual attention of the men in her life. One day, all that changes. Through a friend, she is introduced to rising TV newsreader/announcer George Matthews. After a further chance meeting and a tumble on the sofa, she finds herself pregnant from her first sexual encounter.

After a failed attempt at self-induced abortion, Rosamund resolves to have the child, leaving her on a solitary and at times discouraging path through pregnancy as a single mother.

Previously averse to roommates, she lets her friend Lydia move in with her. She gives birth to her child and works on her dissertation. Her child is diagnosed with a congenital heart defect which requires surgery. The surgeon is a friend of her father and when they both realize this, she finally breaks down in front of him. The doctor assures her everything will be alright, and her baby does survive the surgery. However, the head nurse will not allow her to see the baby while she is in recovery.

After several attempts to see her child, Rosamund finally screams until the surgeon arrives and assures her she can see her child. From then on, she does not leave the hospital, finishing her thesis by her baby's side. She completes her doctorate and is offered a job in Edinburgh.

She runs into George at the pharmacist and invites him back to her flat to meet her child. He is happy to see her and invites her to travel with him. She asks if she can bring her baby, and he demurs. They part without her telling him that he is the child's father, and they both agree that people cannot change their nature.

== Cast ==
- Sandy Dennis as Rosamund
- Ian McKellen as George
- Michael Coles as Joe
- John Standing as Roger
- Peggy Thorpe-Bates as Mrs. Stacey
- Kenneth Benda as Mr. Stacey
- Deborah Stanford as Beatrice
- Roger Hammond as Mike
- Eleanor Bron as Lydia
- Margaret Tyzack as Matron Bennett
- Maurice Denham as Doctor Prothero
- Rachel Kempson as Sister Harvey

== Release ==
The film was entered into the 19th Berlin International Film Festival.

=== Box office ===
Milton Subotsky said the film was not a box office success, but since the filmmakers sold it to the distributors for more than its cost, they made a profit. Rosenberg later said it was in his opinion the best film that Amicus produced.
