= The Pure Gold Baby =

2013 novel by Margaret Drabble

- First edition (publ. Canongate)
- Author: Margaret Drabble
- Language: English
- Genre: Literary fiction
- Publisher: Canongate Books
- Publication date: 2013
- Publication place: United Kingdom
- Media type: Print (hardcover and paperback)
- Preceded by: The Sea Lady

The Pure Gold Baby is British novelist Margaret Drabble's 18th novel, first published in 2013. The novel was her first novel to be published in seven years, following The Sea Lady. In 2009, Drabble had pledged not to write fiction again, for fear of "repeating herself."

The novel follows an anthropologist, who accidentally gets pregnant but decides to keep the child. The novel focuses on examining upper crust of 1960s and 70s London, through the academic and analytical perspective of the character's anthropological training.

Drabble took the title from a phrase in Sylvia Plath's poem "Lady Lazarus".

== Critical reception ==
The Guardian reviewer, Elizabeth Day, had mixed feelings about the novel noting that, "There is a tendency to dissect characters rather than coax them into full-bodied life: their actions are coolly recounted instead of being explained." However, Day concludes that the novel "asks us to consider what it means to live a worthwhile life [... and] the result is a unique and profoundly stirring book. Writing for the Washington Post, Heller McAlpin dislikes the narrator, writing that she is an "unfortunate" choice by Drabble, and is disappointed in the resulting narrative, writing that, "Readers may wish for a greater sense of significance [from the novel]."

Novelist Meg Wolitzer, in an NPR review, wrote that "It's definitely a low-key novel, and slightly remote, but it's also original and ultimately really affecting. I found a kind of sombre bravery in the story of this unwavering, intelligent woman and her guileless and beautiful child."
