= The Millstone (novel) =

Margaret Drabble novel

- First edition
- Author: Margaret Drabble
- Published: 1965
- Publisher: Weidenfeld & Nicolson
- Publication place: United Kingdom

The Millstone is a novel by Margaret Drabble, first published in 1965. It is about an unmarried, young academic who becomes pregnant after a one-night stand and, against all odds, decides to give birth to her child and raise it herself.

== Title ==
Drabble has acknowledged the Biblical source of the title is in Christ's words: "But whoso shall offend one of these little ones who believe in me, it were better that a millstone were hanged about his neck and that he were drowned in the depth of the sea" (Matthew 18:6). The parallel between Christ's words and the plot of the novel is established through the innocent though illegitimate baby, Octavia, the "little one", who is subject to harm, her congenital heart defect rendering her vulnerable in the extreme. Christ's warning of punishment to would-be agents of harm is echoed in the fiercely loving protectiveness of Rosamund, the child's mother. The Millstone, Drabble said in 2011, is about how maternity "changes you into something fiercer than you were before."

Three of Drabble's first six novels have Biblical titles – a remnant perhaps of her Quaker education. The Millstone was the first, the other two being Jerusalem the Golden (1967) and The Needle's Eye (1972).

== Plot summary ==
Set in not-quite-yet Swinging London, The Millstone focuses on the life of Rosamund Stacey, an attractive Cambridge graduate who is writing her thesis on early English poetry while living alone in the spacious flat of her parents, who have gone to Africa for a year on a philanthropic mission. While Rosamund is convinced of both her qualities as a literary historian and her Socialist—and in particular Fabian—ideals, she is rather reluctant when it comes to sex. To avoid being considered old-fashioned or priggish, she has managed to make her small but intimate circle of friends believe that she is carrying on with two men at the same time whereas in fact she is still a virgin and only enjoys her two male friends' company. Each of the men also thinks that she is sleeping with the other one, so neither presses her to have sex with him.

In a pub Rosamund meets George Matthews, a newsreader for BBC Radio, and at once feels attracted to him. But she is quite sure right from the start that he is gay. They end up in her flat and eventually have sex. As George is also under the impression that she has two lovers, Rosamund has no need to hide the fact that this is in fact her first time. Too shy to tell him that she has fallen in love with him, and now believing that he is bisexual, she lets George vanish from her life as quickly as he entered it, in the ensuing months only occasionally listening to his voice on the radio.

When she learns that she is pregnant, a whole new world opens up to her. While she decides against telling George or writing to her parents in order not to unnecessarily upset them, she hopes she will get moral support from her sister Beatrice and her husband, who have three small children themselves. However, after being told the news, Beatrice writes to Rosamund, expressing her shock and disbelief and urging Rosamund either to have an abortion or to give birth to the baby and put it up for adoption immediately afterwards,. Then she can carry on with her independent life and academic career as if nothing had happened.

After a half-hearted attempt at inducing a miscarriage, Rosamund firmly decides to have the baby, without telling George. She will be one of the women Bernard Shaw refers to as "women who want children but no husband".

Her friends take the news well and without asking too many questions about the identity of the father, who, they secretly assume, must be one of her two lovers. Rosamund, however, stops seeing the two men and focuses on her work and her pregnancy. She finds a true friend in Lydia Reynolds, a young novelist who happily takes her up on her offer to share her flat with her in return for the occasional babysitting job once her child has been born. For the first time in her life Rosamund has to deal with the National Health Service and all its inadequacies. When her daughter is born, she decides to name her Octavia after Octavia Hill.

When only a few months old, Octavia is found to have a serious condition of the pulmonary artery, and surgery is unavoidable. The operation is successful, and Rosamund is allowed to take her daughter home after weeks of anxiety while the child is cared for in the hospital.

Lydia, who is now having an affair with one of Rosamund's former "lovers", still lives with her friend. She deals with Octavia, who one day crawled into Lydia's room and partly ripped, partly chewed up much of the typescript of her new novel.

Through subtle connections, Rosamund learns that her parents have found out about the baby by a letter from Octavia's surgeon, a longtime acquaintance of theirs. Her father writes to tell her he and her mother have decided to go to India for the next year. Thus they leave their apartment to Rosamund as she settles into her new life.

The final scene of the novel takes place late at night on Christmas Eve, when Rosamund has to go to an all-night chemist's near her flat to get some medicine for Octavia. There, she has a chance meeting with George, and again invites him up to her flat. Rosamund lies about the baby's age, so that George will not suspect that Octavia might be his. Rosamund persuades a reluctant George to have a look at the sleeping baby, pronounces her beautiful, and leaves again, without Rosamund having told him that she yearns for him.

== Film adaptation ==
This novel was adapted by Drabble as the British film A Touch of Love (American title: Thank You All Very Much) and released in 1969. The film varies little from the novel in plot.

It was directed by Waris Hussein and stars Sandy Dennis, Ian McKellen, Michael Coles, John Standing, and Ellen Bron.
