= The Garrick Year =

Margaret Drabble novel

- First edition (publ. Weidenfeld & Nicolson)
- Author: Margaret Drabble
- Language: English
- Publisher: Weidenfeld & Nicolson
- Publication date: 1964
- OCLC: 1631092
- LC Class: PZ4.D756 Gar

The Garrick Year is the second novel by British novelist Margaret Drabble, first published in 1964. It is a first-person account of Emma, a London wife and mother examining the fraught bits of her marriage and an affair.

== Development ==
Drabble wrote the novel while living in Stratford-upon-Avon, the birthplace of William Shakespeare, thus The Garrick Year focuses significantly on a satirical treatment of the theatre and actors.

== Reception ==
Kirkus Reviews deemed the novel better than Drabble's debut novel, A Summer Bird-Cage.
