= A Natural Curiosity =

1989 novel by Margaret Drabble

- First UK edition
- Author: Margaret Drabble
- Language: English
- Genre: State of the Nation novel, Realist novel
- Published: 1989
- Publisher: Viking Books
- Publication place: United Kingdom
- ISBN: 978-0-670-82837-1

A Natural Curiosity is a 1989 novel by Margaret Drabble. The novel is an unintended sequel to Drabble's 1987 novel The Radiant Way, which follows the lives of the three protagonist women first introduced in that novel. The novel continues Drabble's interest in exploring the contemporary experience of the British middle class through the eyes of women.

== Publication history ==
The novel is part of a three-part series with the same characters, starting with The Radiant Way and succeeded by The Gates of Ivory. A Natural Curiosity was first printed with 30,000 copies. In the preface of the novel, Drabble writes "I had not intended to write a sequel, but felt that the earlier novel was in some way unfinished, that it had asked questions it had not answered." The L.A. Times described the title of the novel, as an "apologetic phrase" responding to Drabble's "curiosity" in continuing to explore the characters.

== Themes ==
The novel is a state of Britain novel in response to post-Thatcher Britain. According to Publishers Weekly, within the context of "mean, cold, ugly, divided, tired ... post-imperial, post-industrial Britain", the novel explores "the problems of racism, international terrorism, random violence, family relationships in the era of divorce, unemployment and urban blight—a cross-section of the ills for which they hold Margaret Thatcher partially responsible."

== Style ==
The novel continues the psychological and social exploration of characters common to much of Drabble's novels. New York Times reviewer Judith Grossman described the novel as furthering Drabble's attempts to explore the same style as Virginia Woolf, with attempt's at realism that mix "the subjective feel of living and the rational, judicial interpretation of that experience, by which we control it in retrospect." Chicago Tribune reviewer describes Roberta Rubenstein describes the novel as a continuation of Drabble's exploration of "the intricate pattern of contemporary experience—from the natural exchanges that animate friendships and romantic relationships to the "unnatural" social pathology that runs like a fault line beneath the surface of ordinary events."

== Reception ==
Reception of the novel was mixed. Publishers Weekly positively writes that "Drabble's quirky characters often seem to exist to vent their author's spleen, they animate an involving story." The L.A. Times reviewer Hermione Lee described the novel as exemplifying "Drabble's best skills [depicting] difficult social scenes, sharp emotions." However, in conclusion, L.A. Times described the novel as "Exasperating [but] you have to admire her compunction." Chicago Tribune reviewer Roberta Rubenstein takes these depictions as more positive, concluding "Brilliantly developing these speculations on the nature of human behavior and personality, Drabble sustains the reader`s curiosity about how matters will be resolved."

Other reviews are more negative. Kirkus Reviews described the novel as a "slighter effort" than The Radiant Way, concluding that the novel is "a disheveled work, then, but from an author whose own humanist curiosity is as appealing as ever." New York Times reviewer Judith Grossman though describing the female characters as complex and interesting, concludes that Drabble's attempt at "rummag[ing] busily in what Woolf called the great bran pie of literature for good stuff cheap [despite] determination and wit, [hasn't] yielded [...] resonance and power."
