= The Seven Sisters (novel) =

2002 novel by Margaret Drabble

First edition (publ. Viking)

The Seven Sisters is a 2002 novel by British novelist Margaret Drabble. The novel reflects on a mid-life crisis of an estranged Candida, when she moves to a rundown London apartment. The novel largely follows Candida's evasive and sometimes deceptive representation of events, including an epistolary section which is her "computer diary".

== Reception ==
Reviews of the novel are largely mixed. Publishers Weekly called the novel a "clever new novel", writing that "Candida's evasive account accurately charts the psychological territory of one who is suddenly cast adrift." The Guardian reviewer Natasha Walker writes that in this narrative "Drabble has managed to capture this sensation of insignificant life, but without forging it into significant fiction." In comparison, reviewer Brooke Allen found the novel an accurate representation of middle age, concluding "Engaging the emotions and the intellect simultaneously and possessed of a rare technical ease, ''The Seven Sisters'' is an unusually satisfying novel."

Many of the reviews compare the narrator to Drabble's earlier characters. The Guardian reviewer Natasha Walter compared Candida to the protagonist to Sarah of A Summer Bird-Cage, writing that they are of the similar intention, but very different effects—which creates an "artificial construct" of Candida. The Observer reviewer Anna Shapiro, had mixed feelings about the novel, writing that the protagonist Candida was not as well written as "the realised heroines of Drabble's magnificent books from the 1960s or 1970s."
