= The Dark Flood Rises =

2016 novel by Margaret Drabble

- First edition (publ. Canongate)
- Author: Margaret Drabble
- Language: English
- Publication date: 2016

The Dark Flood Rises is the 19th novel of Margaret Drabble, and was first published in 2016.

== Theme ==
The title of the book is a quotation from a poem, The Ship of Death, by D. H. Lawrence about mortality: “Piecemeal the body dies, and the timid soul/has her footing washed away, as the dark flood rises.” The main theme is growing old and dying. It is told from multiple viewpoints, all of people linked in some way to Francesca (Fran) Stubbs, an elderly woman who does occasional work for a charity on aspects of living accommodation for the old. There is no strong plot: rather the book conveys different experiences of, and attitudes to, the twilight years of life, with the past histories of the main characters' lives being gradually revealed. In the background are two major contemporary concerns - climate change and the refugee crisis of the years during which it was written, to which there are frequent references: the flood in the title is also a reference to the effects of climate change and to the seas on which many refugees sought to escape to Europe. There is also mention of other potential ecological catastrophes, over which Fran's daughter Poppet is very concerned.

== Critical reception ==
Critical reaction to the book was generally favourable. Reviewers remarked on the relative absence of plot, the mordant wit with which the theme is lightened, and the way the narrative approach, with its multiple viewpoints, mirrors the wanderings of Fran's own mind. The reviewer for The Independent described the book as "witty and intelligent but ultimately uncomfortable, melancholic and rather doom-laden work. It’s not a particularly easy book to read, but it is brimming with relevance." The Guardian reviewer wrote, "beneath the apparently placid surface, Drabble’s novel seethes with apocalyptic intent." The New York Times reviewer summed up the book: "this humane and masterly novel by one of Britain’s most dazzling writers is something else as well, deeper than mere philosophy: a praisesong for the tragical human predicament exactly as it has been ordained on Earth, our terminal house."
