= Seven Sisters =

The Seven Sisters, or the Pleiades, were sister-nymphs in Greek mythology.

Seven Sisters may also refer to:

== Arts and entertainment ==
=== Music ===
- Seven Sisters (Beta Radio album), 2010
- Seven Sisters (Meja album), 1998
- "Seven Sisters", an instrumental by Tori Amos from Night of Hunters, 2011
- "Seven Sisters", a song by MewithoutYou from Catch for Us the Foxes, 2004
- "Seven Sisters", a song by the Sword from Apocryphon, 2012
- "The Seven Sisters", a song by Celldweller from Wish Upon a Blackstar, 2012
- "The Seven Sisters", a song by Rainer Maria from A Better Version of Me, 2001

=== Films ===
- The Seven Sisters (film), a 1915 American silent romantic comedy
- Seven Sisters (film), or What Happened to Monday, a 2017 dystopian science-fiction film

=== Books and plays ===
- The Seven Sisters (musical), an 1860 burlesque extravaganza
- The Seven Sisters, by Anthony Sampson, a 1975 study of the Seven Sisters oil companies
- The Seven Sisters (novel), 1992 British novel by Margaret Drabble
- The Seven Sisters, 2014–2023 book series by Lucinda Riley

=== Other media ===
- Seven Sisters Group, a 1990 British theater performance company
- Seven sisters (studios), the seven original major movie studios
- Seven Sisters (magazines), a group of American women's magazines
- Seven Sisters (Forgotten Realms), fictional role-playing game characters
- The Seven Sisters (role-playing game supplement), for Advanced Dungeons & Dragons

== Biology ==
- Seven Sisters Oak, the largest southern live oak registered in the US
- Jungle babbler, a bird known as "seven sisters" in northern India
- Crinum americanum, a plant commonly known as "seven sisters"
- Sterculia monosperma, a type of nut from Southern China known as "seven sisters' fruit"

== Organizations ==
- Seven Sisters (oil companies), a designation of the seven companies said to dominate the oil industry
- Seven Sisters (colleges), seven historically women's liberal arts colleges
- Seven Sisters (law firms), seven Canadian law firms

== Places ==
=== Australia ===
- Seven Sisters (Queensland), a group of small mountains on the Atherton Tableland in Australia

=== Continental Europe ===
- Seven Sisters (Moscow), a group of skyscrapers in Russia
- Seven Sisters Waterfall (Norway) , Geirangerfjord
- De syv søstre (Seven Sisters), a mountain formation in Helgeland, Norway

=== Ireland ===
- Seven Sisters, Donegal, a mountain chain in Ireland

=== North America ===
- Seven Sisters (Massachusetts), a group of ridgeline knobs in the US Holyoke Range
- Seven Sisters, Baja California, seven surfing point breaks in Mexico
- Seven Sisters Falls, Manitoba, a community in Canada
- Seven Sisters Mountain, Alberta, Canada
- Seven Sisters Peaks, British Columbia, Canada
- Seven Sisters, Texas, US

=== United Kingdom ===
==== England ====
- Seven Sisters, London
  - Seven Sisters (Haringey ward), an electoral ward
  - Seven Sisters Market, a market in Tottenham
  - Seven Sisters station, a rail and Tube station
  - Seven Sisters Road, North London
- Seven Sisters (Quantock Hills), a prominent Somerset landmark
- Seven Sisters Road, St Lawrence, Isle of Wight
- Seven Sisters, East Sussex, a group of chalk cliffs
- Seven Sisters Rocks, Symonds Yat, Herefordshire
- Seven Sisters, local name for the College Bank tower blocks in Rochdale, Greater Manchester

==== Wales ====
- Seven Sisters, Neath Port Talbot, a village
  - Seven Sisters (Neath Port Talbot ward), an electoral ward, Neath Port Talbot

=== Hong Kong ===
- Tsat Tsz Mui (Seven Sisters), an area and road in Hong Kong

=== India ===
- Seven Sister States, a region in northeastern India

== Other uses ==
- The Seven Sisters, or Pleiades, a star cluster
- The Seven Sisters songline, a creation (Dreaming) story in Aboriginal Australian mythology
- The Seven Sisters of American Protestantism, a grouping of religious denominations
- Sette Sorelle (Serie A), (Seven Sisters), a grouping of the most successful Italian Serie A football clubs

== See also ==
- Pleiades in folklore and literature
- "Revenge of the Seven Daughters", a lost Chinese story
