= The Ice Age (novel) =

Margaret Drabble novel

- First edition publ. Weidenfeld & Nicolson
- Author: Margaret Drabble
- Language: English
- Publication date: 1977

The Ice Age is a 1977 novel by British novelist Margaret Drabble. The novel follows the experiences of former BBC producer Anthony Keating as he experiences the ups and downs of life during the 1960s and 1970s. Depicting the property crisis in Britain during that period, it diverges from her earlier psychological studies of individuals, focusing more on the "state of England".

== Development ==
Drabble's inspiration was from reading newspapers, and reflecting on the extensive "economic analysis in the paper [about] declining Britain", something she didn't see reflected in fiction.

== Reception ==
Kirkus Reviews wrote that while "Drabble's rich textures and great sympathy muffle the political", and "her characters are too much alike ever really to clash", this was little compared to "the impressive achievement" of a novel that contains "disturbing, resonant, powerful depths."

Simon Reynolds described The Ice Age as "a counterpart to punk in British literature which captured a mid-70s moment of malaise and crisis in the UK".
