= The Red Queen (Drabble novel) =

- First edition (publ. Viking)
- Author: Margaret Drabble
- Language: English
- Publication date: 2004

The Red Queen is a 2004 novel by British novelist Margaret Drabble. The novel describes the trip of a British academic on a trip to Seoul to give a paper at a conference. At the beginning of the novel, the academic, Dr. Babs Halliwell, reads the memoir of a 19th-century Korean princess.

== Reception ==
Reception of the novel was mixed, focusing on the novels' poor treatment of trans-cultural representation. For example, The Observer reviewer David Jays, writes that the novel's prose is full of "solemn repetitions, with rare flinty moments." Moreover, he writes that "But both Drabble's ancient and modern Seoul lack the relish and imaginative pragmatism that have recently helped popularise Korean food and movies." Similarly, the New York Times Sunday Book Review, described the novel as failing at meeting the expectations of the subtitle "a transcultural tragicomedy." Reviewer Richard Eder writes "What we are left with are two narratives entirely separate in style and content, and two voices that never really connect. As for tragicomedy, there's no breath of humour in the princess' stiffly told story and hardly a splinter of irony."

Guardian reviewer Maureen Freely described the novel as "an implausible but gorgeously trashy romance[...] Rarely has feminist escapism been so stylishly disguised."
