= Borremose Man =

Iron Age bog body found in Denmark

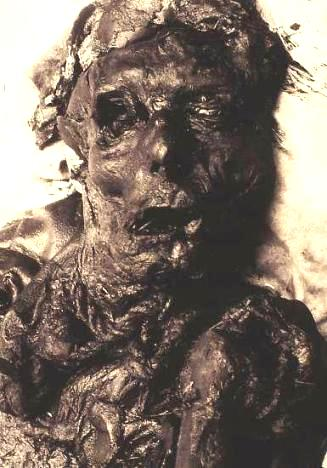
- Borremose Man shortly after his discovery
- Born: Unknown
- Died: 365–116 BCE; Borremose, Himmerland, Denmark
- Body discovered: 1946
- Other name: Borremose I
- Known for: Bog body
- Height: 1.55 m (5 ft 1 in)

Borremose Man (Danish: Borremosemanden), also known as Borremose I, is an Iron Age bog body discovered during peat cutting in 1946 in the Borremose bog in Himmerland, Denmark. He was the first of three prehistoric individuals recovered from the bog between 1946 and 1948. Initially reported to police as a possible recent murder victim, his tightly flexed body was found beneath the peat with birch wood placed over it.

Borremose Man was about 1.55 m (5 ft 1 in) tall and was found naked, with two sheepskin capes and a woven cap beside him. A 36-centimetre (14 in) rope with a slipknot remained around his neck, and examination identified injuries to the back of his skull and right femur. These findings have contributed to interpretations of a violent death, although the circumstances of his death remain uncertain.

Modern radiocarbon dating of textile associated with the find produced a calibrated date of 365–116 BCE, placing Borremose Man in the Pre-Roman Iron Age. The revised dating is several centuries later than earlier estimates that had allowed the find to be placed as early as the Late Bronze Age.

== Discovery ==
Borremose Man was discovered in May 1946 during peat cutting in the southern part of the Borremose bog in Himmerland, northern Jutland, Denmark. He was found about 2 m (6.6 ft) below the bog surface, in an upright position with his body tightly flexed. Because the remains were initially thought to belong to a recent murder victim, the find was reported to police before its archaeological age was recognized.

Birch wood had been placed over the body, including a branch about 1 m (3.3 ft) long and 4 cm (1.6 in) thick. The peat surrounding the remains appeared undisturbed. Because the body was fragile, it was recovered together with the surrounding peat rather than being lifted directly, preserving the remains and their immediate archaeological context for further examination.

The body was found at 56°47′23″N 9°34′11″E.

== Clothing and associated items ==
Scheme of Borremose Man's preserved body parts shortly after his discovery in 1946: red = fractures, beige = soft tissue, grey/white = bones.

The body was naked and two sheepskin capes and a woven cap lay beside it. One of the sheepskin capes was assembled from numerous large and small pieces of sheepskin sewn together in a symmetrical pattern. It was stitched closed at the front and could be worn with either the fleece or the leather facing outwards.

== Condition ==
Borremose Man was only partly preserved when he was recovered. Soft tissue, including skin, survived on some parts of his body, while elsewhere the bones were exposed. His hands were especially well preserved and retained their narrow shape, although his fingernails had dissolved. Enough of his remains survived for investigators to estimate his height at about 1.55 m (5 ft 1 in).

== Scientific study ==
Radiocarbon dating of Borremose Man has changed substantially as dating methods have improved. An early measurement of 2600 ± 80 BP (radiocarbon years before 1950) produced a calibrated date of 920–410 BCE at 95.4% probability. This broad range allowed the find to be placed as early as the Late Bronze Age.

Later testing shifted the chronology forward by several centuries. A new radiocarbon measurement of textile associated with Borremose Man gave 2173 ± 32 BP, corresponding to a calibrated date of 365–116 BCE at 95.4% probability.

The same dating programme re-examined material associated with Borremose II and Borremose III. Earlier radiocarbon results had placed the three Borremose finds collectively between 920 and 200 BCE. The revised dates narrowed this to 483–95 BCE and placed all three within the Scandinavian Pre-Roman Iron Age. The new Borremose measurements were made on associated textiles rather than directly on the human remains.

== Cause of death ==
Borremose Man was found with a 36-centimetre (14 in) rope with a slipknot around his neck indicating death by strangulation. However, examination also revealed a crushing blow to the back of the skull and the right femur had been broken.

== See also ==
- List of Danish bog bodies
