= The Waterfall (novel) =

Margaret Drabble novel

- First edition, cover design by Lou Klein (publ. Weidenfeld & Nicolson)
- Author: Margaret Drabble
- Language: English
- Publication date: 1969

The Waterfall is a 1969 novel by British novelist Margaret Drabble. The novel is one of Drabble's more experimental narratives, starting as a third person narrative but quickly dominated by a first person protagonist Jane Gray, to guide the reader through her love affair and life.

== Reception ==
The New York Times reviewer Maureen Howard gave the novel mixed reviews, suggesting that it wasn't artistic enough. Howard writes that the novel is missing a "richness of seemingly effortless design, that is missing in Margaret Drabble's work. Like her heroine, she is still confined in a self-conscious world."
