= Seven Sisters, Baja California =

Surfing point breaks in Baja California, Mexico

Coordinates: 28.616°N 114.184°W

Seven Sisters is a set of seven surfing point breaks in the Mexican state of Baja California. According to Moon Baja: Tijuana to Los Cabos, "Santa Rosalillita is a great access point for the Seven Sisters, a series of seven right point breaks starting at Punta Cono in the north and ending at Punta Rosarito with The Wall as the southernmost point." In addition to Punta Cono and The Wall, the Seven Sisters include Punta Maria, El Cardon, Punta Lobos, Punta Prieta, and San Andrés. In Spanish, the Seven Sisters are known as el surf Siete Hermanas.

These breaks break best in the wintertime on West and Northwest swells. All of the point breaks are subject to hazards such as rocks, rip currents and sometime even sharks have been spotted at these breaks.
