= The Witch of Exmoor =

- First edition (publ. Viking)
- Author: Margaret Drabble
- Language: English
- Publication date: 1996

The Witch of Exmoor is a 1996 novel by Margaret Drabble. The novel is a social novel, with a focus on exploring the state of post-Thatcher Britain through the Dickensian satire of the Palmer family. The title describes the satirical protagonist, Frieda Palmer, who provides the source of much of the social commentary.

== Reception ==
The novel had mixed reviews. Washington Post reviewer Frances Sellers suggested that the novel's criticism of "Britain's privileged middle classes" might have turned her critics, which would endear her to middle class reviewers.

The New York Times reviewer James Wood did not like the novel, focusing on how the novel's characters were underdeveloped "caricatures" and poor comparisons to the literary traditions created by Dickens and Woolf. The Washington Post was similarly critical of the novel, writing that its "very strengths are its downfall. With its allusive style, caustic wit and sharp insights, it is a very clever book. But, just like the conundrum from which it draws its inspiration, it sometimes feels more like an intellectual exercise."

Other reviewers were more positive. The L.A. Times describes the novel as successfully handling the difficult elements of "comic irony" where Drabble has "the balance just right and proves herself a master of the art". Kirkus Reviews called the novel one of Drabble's "best and most assured novel in years" describing it as "satire and melodrama, nicely mixed, and a thoroughly satisfying entertainment." Similarly Publishers Weekly describes the novel as "postmodern family drama at its best."
