= Borremose =

Bog in Himmerland, Denmark

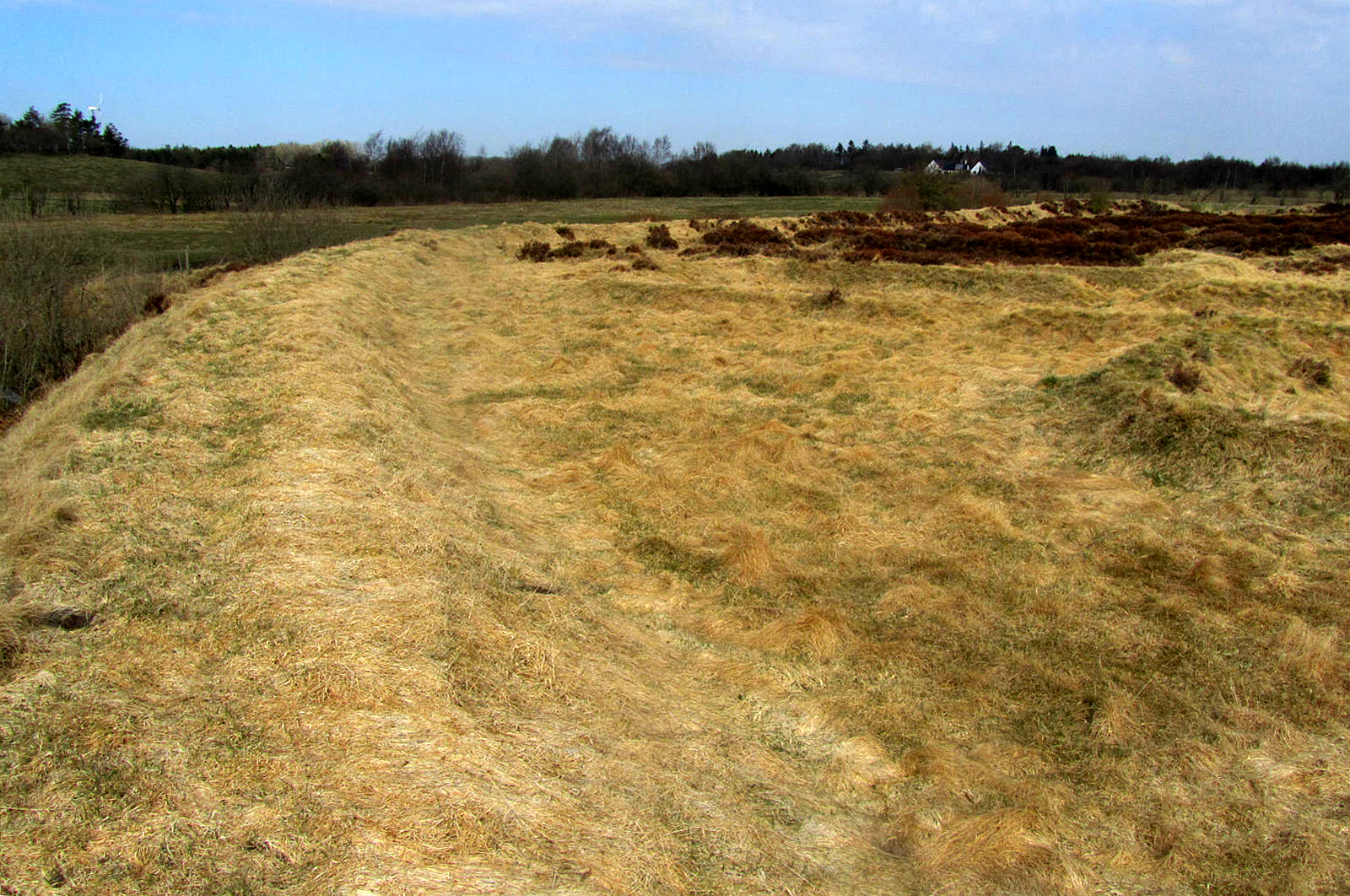
- Earth rampart of the fortified settlement at Borremose

- Location within Denmark
- 56°46′50″N 9°34′05″E
- Type: Fortified settlement and bog body findspot
- Periods: Nordic Bronze Age; Pre-Roman Iron Age
- Cultures: Nordic Bronze Age; Nordic Iron Age
- Location: Himmerland, Denmark
- Nearest city: Aars

Site notes
- Discovered: 1929 (fortified settlement)
- Condition: Partially reconstructed
- Public access: Yes

Borremose is a raised bog in central Himmerland, Denmark south east of the town of Aars. The name translates directly as 'Borre'-bog, where 'Borre' might well be a derivation of the old word burgh meaning fortified place, as seen in many other place-names.

== Site ==
The northern part of the bog is heavily overgrown with trees and shrubs nowadays and is inaccessible in most places. Furthermore, due to industrial turf-production during and after World War II, large parts of the bog has turned into lakes.

== Discovery ==
The site was rediscovered in 1929 when the bog was being turned into arable land.

== Fortified settlement ==
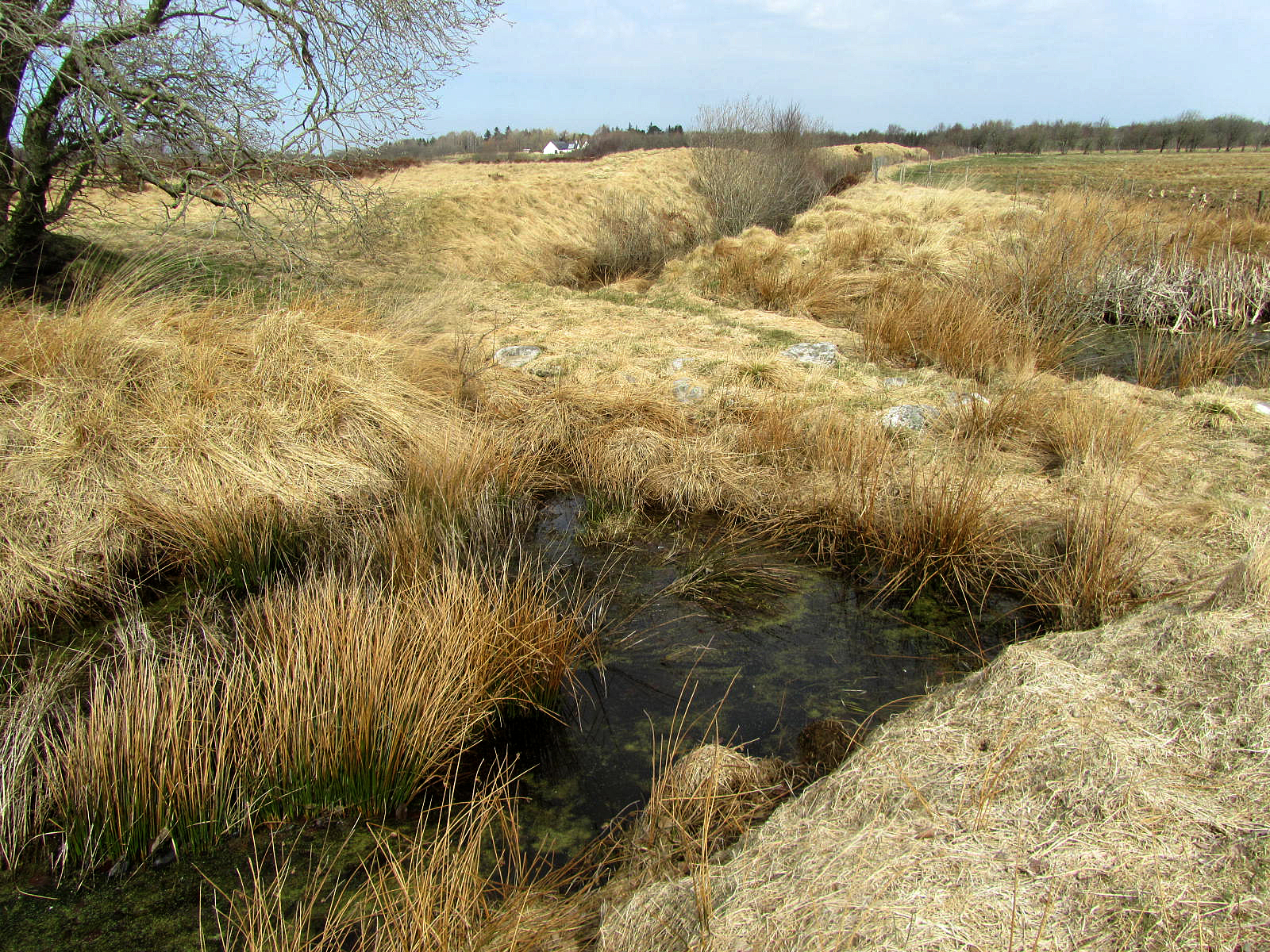
The former road across the artificial moat of the Iron Age Borremose Fortification. It is still visible and in use after an archaeological restoration.

The bog also contains a fortified settlement dating to the Pre-Roman Iron Age.

Borremose is known for and identified with a former fortified settlement dating from the Pre-Roman Iron Age (400-100 BC) (Martens 1994)(Martens 2004) (Martens 2007) (Martens 2010) .

It was constructed during the 4th century BC, as one of the largest structures of its kind in Northern Europe, but was already abandoned during the 2nd century BC, when the houses were burned down and the whole site levelled to the ground.

The area was used for agricultural purposes during the 1st century AD, after which it was abandoned and left to the bog.

The fortified settlement of Borremose comprised a 140 x 90 m gravel bank surrounded by a moat with earth mounds on the inner side and connected to dry land by a 150 metres artificial cobbled road. The 450 m long moat, was 4 m wide, 1,5 m deep and with a flat bottom.

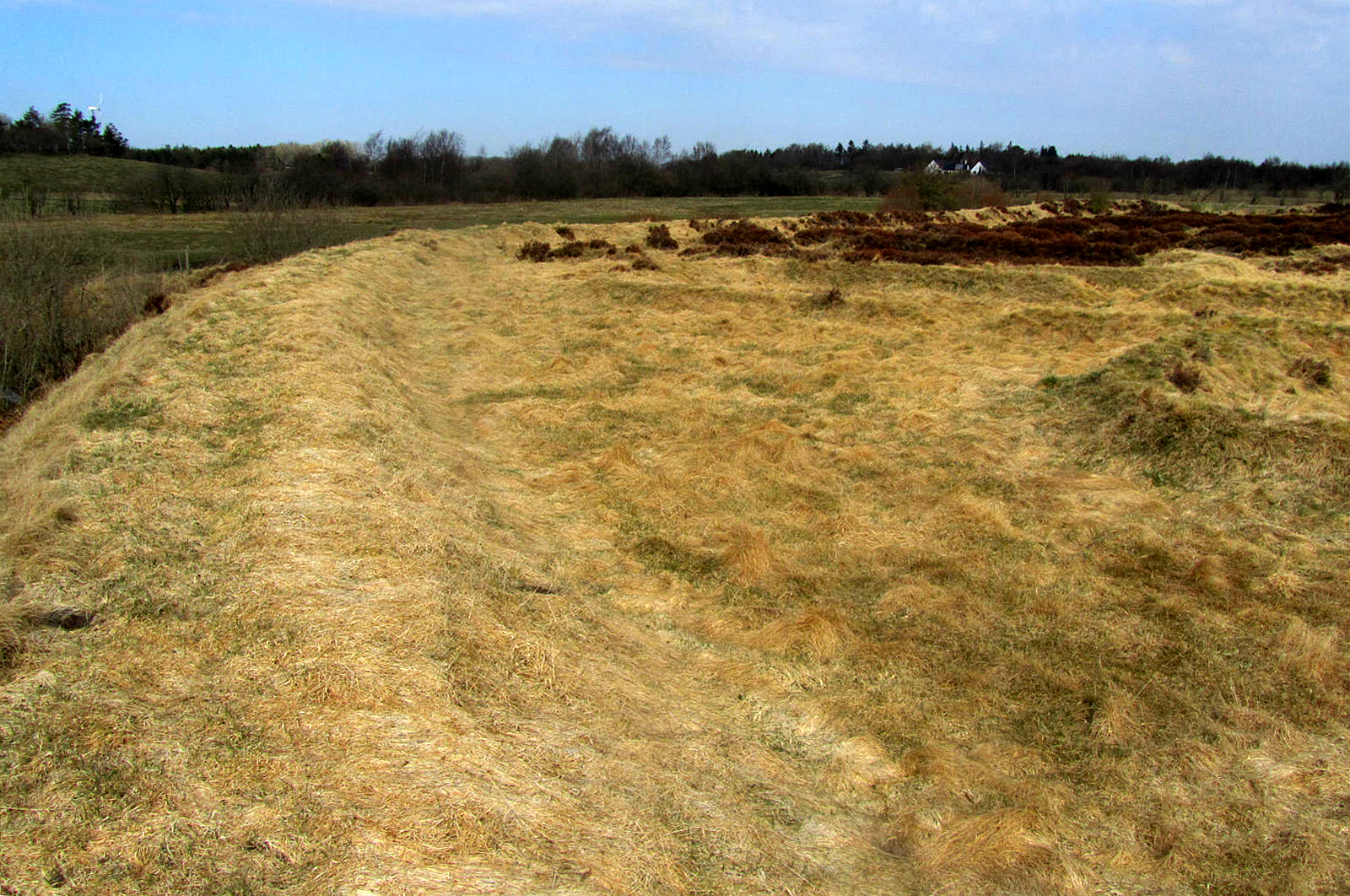
The earth-rampart of the Borremose Fortification.

The settlement consisted of what seem to be ordinary long houses though without byre. At the most about 20 long houses may have been in use at the same time.

After the excavation, the house sites were marked with turf walls so the settlement plan is visible for the visitor today; furthermore, the moats have been emptied and the walls reconstructed. For a long time, the Borremose-fortification was the only known Iron Age fortified settlement in Scandinavia, until a similar construction was discovered at Lyngsmose near Ringkøbing in western Jutland in 1999. Because of this, such structures are sometimes referred to as "Borremose-fortifications", regardless of their whereabouts.

The land around Borremose has revealed several individual settlements from the Nordic Iron Age and a few kilometres south east of the boglands, the village of Østerbølle with 9 longhouses and a number of small houses, has recently been restored.

== Human remains ==
At least four bog bodies have been found at Borremose. Three well-documented bodies were recovered during postwar peat cutting, one each in 1946, 1947 and 1948. They are now known as Borremose Man, Borremose II and Borremose Woman.

Borremose Man was discovered in May 1946 in the southern part of the bog, about 0.5 m (1.6 ft) below the surface and beneath a layer of birch branches. A 36-centimetre (14 in) rope with a slipknot remained around his neck, and injuries were identified on his skull and right femur. Two sheepskin capes and a woven cap were found with him.

Borremose II was found the following year, about 1 km (0.62 mi) from Borremose Man and approximately 60 cm (24 in) below the surface. The poorly preserved individual was initially identified as male, but this was later questioned because the associated textiles included a skirt and fringed shawl characteristic of women's clothing in the Early Iron Age. One garment, however, showed evidence of having previously been worn as a man's cape. Two bones from a newborn infant were also found with the remains.

Borremose Woman, also known as Borremose III, was discovered during peat cutting in 1948. She was found lying face down and partly covered by a large woollen skirt, and was estimated to have been between 20 and 35 years old. Later forensic examination found no evidence that the extensive damage to her skull had occurred during life, and researchers were unable to determine her cause or manner of death.

More recent radiocarbon dating has substantially narrowed earlier estimates for the three preserved bodies. Dating of the bodies and associated textiles and skins places the Borremose I, II and III finds collectively between 483 and 95 BCE, within the Pre-Roman Iron Age.

The circumstances in which the bodies entered the bog remain uncertain. Earlier researchers proposed explanations including human sacrifice and punishment, while later scholarship has cautioned against treating bog bodies as a single archaeological phenomenon. Munksgaard noted that the term bog body describes human remains preserved by the acidic conditions of a raised bog and does not itself imply a particular date or reason for deposition.

== Other finds ==
The famous silver "Gundestrup cauldron" was found in the minor bog of Rævemosen less than 1 km to the north of Borremose in 1891. A bronze kettle made by Etruscans around 300 BC, has also been unearthed in the nearby bog of Mosbæk in 1875. In earlier times, Borremose was much larger than what remains today and both Rævemosen and Mosbæk, was an integral part of the Borremose boglands.

== Exhibition ==
Some of the finds from Borremose are on exhibit at Museumcentre Aars in the town of Aars, either as copies or originals. The museum centre presents many other interesting finds from western Himmerland, like Scandinavias oldest known human skull, 10,000 years old from the Maglemosian culture. Since Borremose is so inaccessible, it is estimated to hold many interesting finds for the future.

== In literature ==
Danish fictive treatments involving Borremose include:

- Ebbe Kløvedal Reich: Fæ og frænde (1977)
- Børge Børresen: Kimbrerborgen; Gyldendal (1948)
- Børge Børresen: Kimbrertoget; Gyldendal (1949)

== Sources ==
- Borremose Pdf-pamphlet with maps of the site. Municipality of Vesthimmerland (in Danish)
- Borremose Danish Agency for Culture
- Borremose Information on Borremosen and the Borremose Fortification. Vesthimmerlands Museum (in Danish)
- Borremose Vesthimmerlands Museum (pictures) (in Danish)
- Andersen, Alfred (1975), Geologiske undersøgelser omkring Borremosebebyggelsen. Aarbøger for Nordisk Oldkyndighed og Historie, pp. 96–118
- Glob, Peter V (1969), The Bog People, London: Faber & Faber
- Martens, Jes. Refuge (1994), fortified settlement - central place? Three years of archaeological investigations at the Borremose stronghold (1989-1991), an enclosed settlement from the Pre-Roman Iron Age of Himmerland, vol. 35, Ethnographisch-Archäologische Zeitschrift, pp. 241–276
- Martens, Jes (2004), Interpreting the Unexpected. Reflections on Failure and Success in Phosphate Mapping, vol. 28, Probleme der Küstenforschung im Südlichen Nordseegebiet, pp. 293–320
- Martens, Jes (2007), Fortified places in lowland Northern Europe and Scandinavia during the Pre-Roman Iron Age. I: Keltische Einflüsse im Mitteleuropa Während der mittleren und jüngeren vorrömischen Eisenzeit, Frankfurt am Main: Römisch-Germanische Kommission des Deutschen Archäologischen Instituts, pp. 87–105, ISBN 978-3-7749-3501-3
- Martens, Jes (2010), A magnate's farm at Borremose?., vol. 33, Siedlungs- und Küstenforschung im Südlichen Nordseegebiet, pp. 181–195
- Thorvildsen, Elise (1952), Menneskeofringer i Oldtiden. Kuml, pp. 32–47
- Thorvildsen, Elise (1981), Borremosedage. Kammerat Glob, ed. H.Andersen, P.Skal og E.Thorvildsen, Højbjerg, Wormianum, pp. 43–52
- Thorvildsen, Knud (1947), Moseliget fra Borremose i Himmerland, Fra Nationalmuseets Arbejdsmark, pp. 57–67
