= Borremose II =

Iron Age bog body found in Denmark

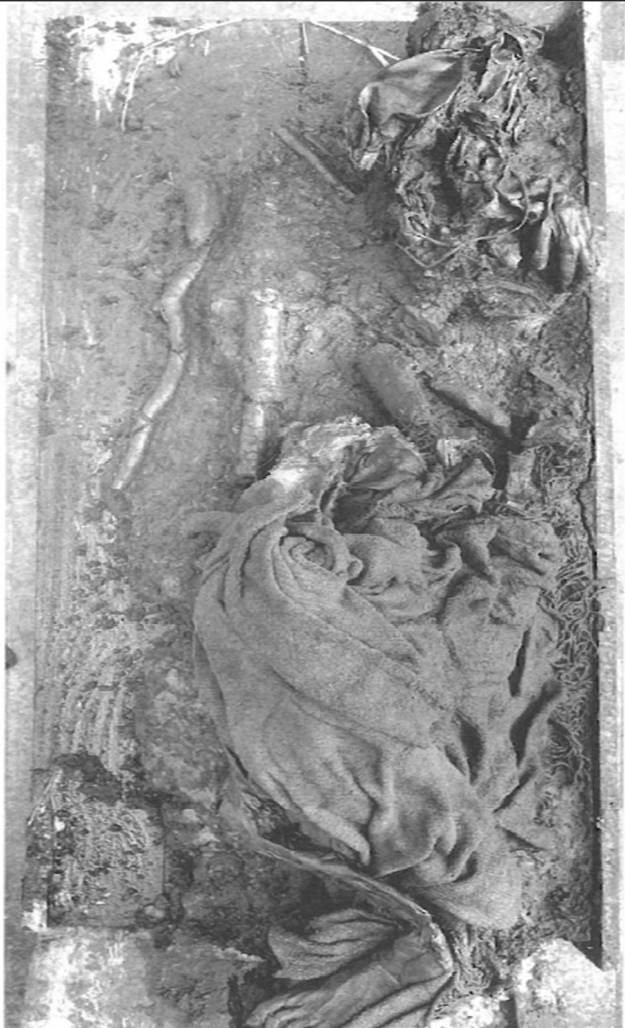
- Borremose II
- Born: Unknown
- Died: 483–95 BCE; Borremose, Himmerland, Denmark
- Body discovered: 1947
- Known for: Bog body

Borremose II is an Iron Age bog body discovered in 1947 in the Borremose peat bog in Himmerland, Denmark. The second of three bog bodies recovered from the bog between 1946 and 1948, the individual was found face down about 60 centimetres (24 in) below the surface, resting on birch bark with three birch poles placed above the body. The bones of an infant and a ceramic vessel were found nearby.

The individual's sex remains uncertain. Borremose II was initially identified as male, while later interpretation of the associated clothing suggested a woman; subsequent research has cautioned against determining sex from clothing alone and has again described the individual as male. Radiocarbon dating of material associated with the Borremose bodies places them within a calibrated range of 483–95 BCE, during the Scandinavian Pre-Roman Iron Age. The clothing associated with Borremose II includes a large twill garment and fringed shawl, with evidence that the twill garment had previously been worn as a man's cape.

== Discovery ==
The individual now known as Borremose II was discovered in 1947 in the Borremose peat bog in Himmerland, Denmark. They were found one year after Borremose Man, about 1 kilometre (0.62 mi) from the place where his body had been discovered.

Borremose II was lying face down about 60 centimetres (24 in) below the surface of the bog. When their remains were uncovered, a layer of birch bark was found directly beneath them. Three birch poles lay above their body. The bones of an infant and a ceramic vessel were also found nearby.

Borremose II was the second of three bog bodies discovered at Borremose between 1946 and 1948. Their findspot was recorded at 56°47′36″N 9°34′55″E.

== Condition ==
The skull was fractured and the brain was visible. The right leg was broken below the knee.

== Clothing and associated items ==
While the upper torso was naked, the lower body was wrapped in a cloak made of a four-layered twill fabric and a fringed shawl. The large twill cloth overlapped at the front and was fastened with a leather thong threaded through pairs of holes along one edge, allowing archaeologists to reconstruct how it had originally been worn and estimate a waist circumference of about 70–75 cm.

The garments closely resemble those found with the Huldremose Woman and the Store Arden Woman, among the best-preserved examples of early Iron Age women's dress. Wear patterns on the large twill cloth suggest that it had previously been used as a man's cape before being deposited with the body. These two garments are now on display at the National Museum of Denmark in Copenhagen.

Because garments made from plant fibres rarely survive in acidic peat, it is uncertain whether additional clothing originally accompanied the burial. A leather cord with an amber bead and bronze plate was around the neck.

== Scientific study ==
The sex of Borremose II has been interpreted differently over time. The individual was initially identified and published as male. In 1984, Elisabeth Munksgaard of the National Museum of Denmark argued that the associated clothing suggested a woman, particularly the four-shaft twill skirt and fringed shawl, which resembled women's clothing from other Pre-Roman Iron Age bog finds. She also noted that the skirt showed evidence of earlier use as a man's cape.

Later research was more cautious about identifying sex from clothing. In 2009, Danish archaeologist Ulla Mannering and colleagues described Borremose II as male and noted that some textile forms previously associated with women also occur in male contexts, complicating attempts to determine sex from associated garments alone.

Radiocarbon dating has also revised the chronology of the find. Earlier dating placed the three Borremose bodies within a broad range of approximately 920–200 BCE. New accelerator mass spectrometry (AMS) measurements of textiles and hides associated with Danish bog finds narrowed the date range for Borremose I, II and III to 483–95 BCE. The revised chronology places the Borremose finds within the Scandinavian Pre-Roman Iron Age.

== See also ==
- List of Danish bog bodies
