= The Middle Ground =

Margaret Drabble novel

- First edition publ. Weidenfeld and Nicolson
- Author: Margaret Drabble
- Language: English
- Publication date: 1980

The Middle Ground is a 1980 novel by British novelist Margaret Drabble. It is her ninth published novel. The novel explores the "crisis of British urban life" through the eyes of a middle aged journalist, Kate Armstrong.

Several critics compare the narrative to Virginia Woolf's Mrs Dalloway, with critic Roberta Rubenstein calling the novel "essentially plotless" instead exploring human relationships in a particular time and space.

== Intertextuality ==
The novel contains long reflections on Kate's past; several critics describe these reflections as similar to Mrs. Dalloway. Kirkus Review's describes the same stylistic features, writing that the novel is "Told almost completely in a series of ruminations (Kate's and her friends'), the book has a vulnerable, occasionally fey, but almost consistently charming lurch to it." The novel also has episodes that give homage to Proust.

Critic Roberta Rubenstien suggest that the title of the novel likely refers to Henry James's The Middle Years.

== Reception ==
The novel had mixed reception. The New York Times reviewer Phyllis Rose, described the novel as part of Drabble's chronicling of 20th century British culture, comparing her to Dickens and Balzac, though in doing so it is a "faltering step in her development". However, Rose had mixed feelings about the novel's treatment, describing it as focusing too much on commentary, writing "it hurts the novel that it is so mercilessly topical." Margaret Forster called the novel "not a novel but a sociological treatise".

Kirkus Reviews gave praise for the novel, writing "with each succeeding novel, Drabble appears to edge ever closer to being E. M. Forster's heir: rich works, turned and molded by helpless circumstance, about the apprehensions and redemptions of staying responsible."
