= The Realms of Gold =

Margaret Drabble novel

- First edition publ. Weidenfeld & Nicolson
- Author: Margaret Drabble
- Language: English
- Publisher: Weidenfeld & Nicolson
- Publication date: 1975
- ISBN: 0-297-76979-0 (first edition)
- Dewey Decimal: 823.914
- LC Class: PZ4.D756 Re

The Realms of Gold is a 1975 novel by British novelist Margaret Drabble. The novel explores the mid-life experiences of anthropologist Frances Wingate and her affair with Karel Schmidt.

== Development ==
Drabble describes the initial inspiration for the novel in an interview in The Paris Review:

I was trying to think of something really amusing and cheerful and I thought of the octopus I saw in the museum at Naples. I can't remember what I was doing in this maritime museum. I can't remember who took me. But suddenly there it was, a lot of imagery of nature: the natural world of species, the flora and fauna, the fact that Frances's father studied newts. It all just seemed to fit very nicely.

—

== Style ==
The novel is primarily a reflection on Wingate's life, but critic Broyard, describes the novels best features are "Brilliant little essays" about life and life issues.

== Critical reception ==
Reception of the novel was mixed. New York Times reviewer Anatole Broyard described the novel as "drenched with intelligence, that is not enough to make it work." Broyard compared Drabble's poor work to the poor subsequent novels by Edna O'Brien and Gail Godwin. Kirkus review was much more positive about the novel, calling it "a conspicuous pleasure to read--a cheerful reconciliation of the exactions of the past and the possibilities that lie just ahead."
