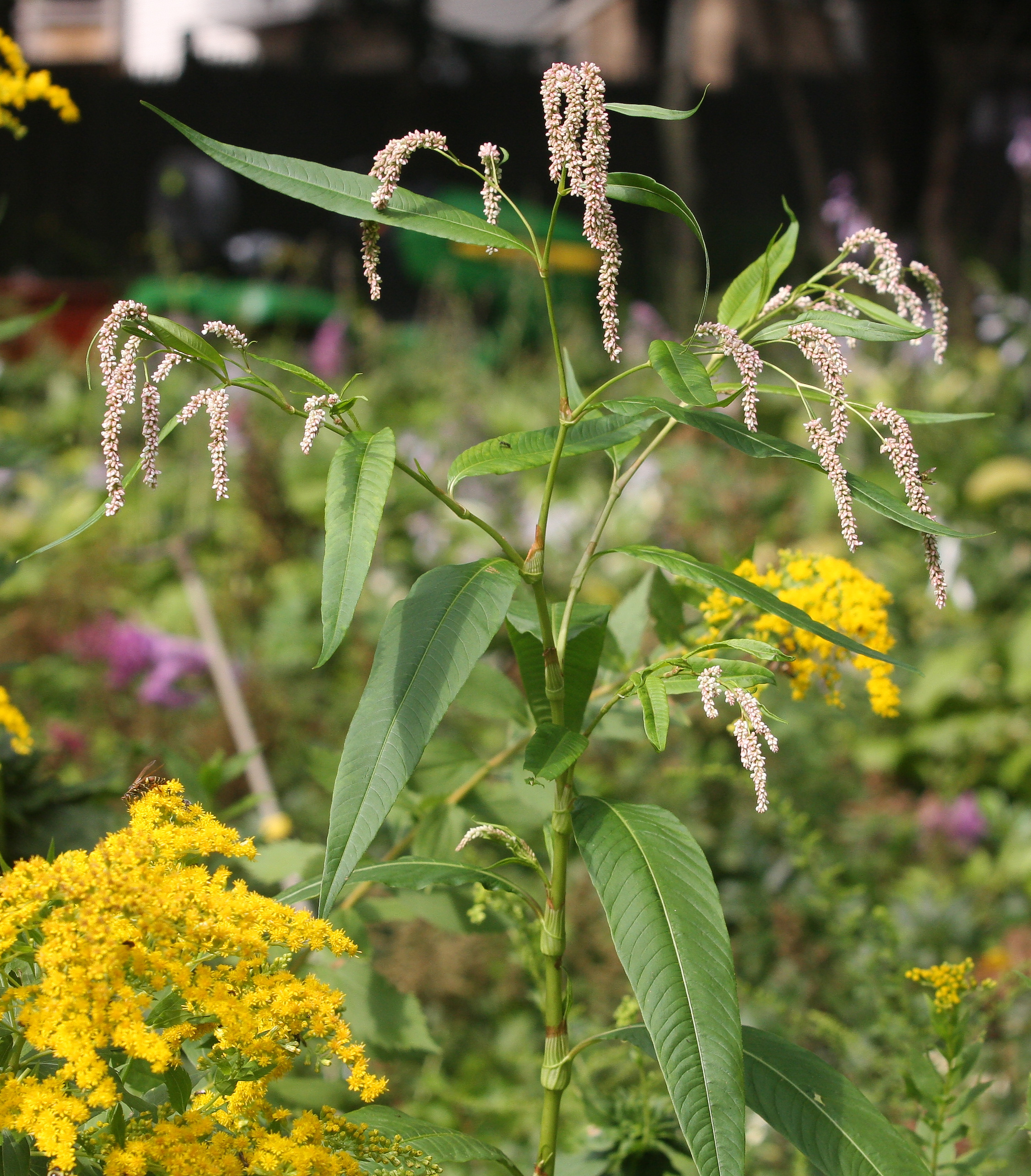

Scientific classification
- Kingdom: Plantae
- Clade: Tracheophytes
- Clade: Angiosperms
- Clade: Eudicots
- Order: Caryophyllales
- Family: Polygonaceae
- Genus: Persicaria
- Species: P. lapathifolia

Binomial name
- Persicaria lapathifolia (L.) Delarbre

Synonyms
- List: Dioctis maculatum Raf.; Dioctis vernum Raf.; Discolenta lapathifolia Raf.; Discolenta scabra Raf.; Persicaria bioritsuensis (Ohki) Ohki ex Nakai; Persicaria brittingeri (Opiz) Opiz; Persicaria glandulosa Nakai; Persicaria hypanica (Klokov) Tzvelev; Persicaria incarnata (Elliott) Small; Persicaria komarovii (H.Lév.) Soják; Persicaria krugii H.Gross & Loes.; Persicaria lanigera (R.Br.) Soják; Persicaria laxa (Rchb.) Soják; Persicaria maculata (Sibth.) Gray; Persicaria mesomorpha (Danser) Büscher & G.H.Loos; Persicaria nodosa (Pers.) Opiz; Persicaria oneillii Brenckle; Persicaria pseudojaponica (Ohki) Nakai; Persicaria pseudonodosa (Ohki) Sasaki; Persicaria salicifolia (Sibth.) Gray; Persicaria saporoviensis (Klokov) Tzvelev; Persicaria tenuiflora (C.Presl) H.Hara; Persicaria turgida (Thuill.) Holub; Persicaria vaniotiana H.Lév.; Peutalis incana Raf.; Peutalis nodosa (Pers.) Raf.; Peutalis scabra Raf.; Pleuropteropyrum ochreatum Nakai; Polygonum adenophorum Spreng.; Polygonum andrzejowskianum Klokov; Polygonum arachnoideum Klotzsch ex Meisn.; Polygonum araucanum Phil.; Polygonum barbatum Thunb.; Polygonum baumgartenianum Schur; Polygonum bioritauense Ohki; Polygonum bracteosum Phil.; Polygonum brittingeri Opiz; Polygonum cumingianum Gand.; Polygonum danubiale A.Kern.; Polygonum decumbens Schur; Polygonum eurybelonum Danser; Polygonum euryphyllum Danser; Polygonum glabrum Rchb.; Polygonum glandulosum R.Br.; Polygonum glandulosum Kit.; Polygonum glareosum Phil.; Polygonum glutinosum Wall. ex Meisn.; Polygonum hassanabdalicum Chaudhri; Polygonum hypanicum Klokov; Polygonum incarnatum Elliott; Polygonum komarovii H.Lév.; Polygonum lanceifolium Danser; Polygonum lanigerum R.Br.; Polygonum lapathifolium L.; Polygonum laxum Rchb.; Polygonum maculatum (Sibth.) Bab.; Polygonum maculatum Krock.; Polygonum nodosum Pers.; Polygonum nutans Roxb.; Polygonum obliquum Kit.; Polygonum obtusatum Steud. ex Meisn.; Polygonum ochreatum Houtt.; Polygonum pallens Pers.; Polygonum paniculatum Andrz.; Polygonum petecticale (Stokes) Druce; Polygonum pseudojaponicum Ohki; Polygonum pseudonodosum Ohki; Polygonum punctatum Krock.; Polygonum pyramidale H.Lév.; Polygonum quadrifidum Meisn.; Polygonum saporoviense Klokov; Polygonum simlense Royle ex Bab.; Polygonum somphocarpum Bruyn; Polygonum tenuiflorum C.Presl; Polygonum turgidum Thuill.; Polygonum utriculatum J.Rémy; Polygonum valdivianum Phil.; Polygonum vanictianum (H.Lév.) H.Lév.; Polygonum viscosum Bastard ex Meisn.

= Persicaria lapathifolia =

Plant species in the buckwheat family

Persicaria lapathifolia (syn. Polygonum lapathifolium), known as pale persicaria, is a plant of the family Polygonaceae. It is considered to be native throughout most of the world, from arctic to tropical realms, except South America and Southern Africa. It is closely related to Persicaria maculosa and as such is considered a weed in Britain and Europe. Other common names for the plant include pale smartweed, curlytop knotweed, and willow weed. It is a species complex made up of a great many varying forms, sometimes considered varieties. The environment also has a strong influence on the morphology of an individual plant.

== Description ==
Persicaria lapathifolia is an annual herb with erect reddish stems with swollen joints, growing to a height of 20 to 80 cm (8 to 31 in). The leaves are alternate with short stalks, often densely hairy underneath. The leaf blades often have a dark-coloured blotch in the centre and are lanceolate or narrowly elliptical and have entire margins. Each leaf base has stipules which are fused into a stem-enclosing sheath that is loose and fringed with few if any hairs at the upper end. The inflorescence is a dense spike, often nodding. The perianth of each tiny pink flower consists of four or five lobes, fused near the base. There are six stamens, two partially fused carpels and two styles. The fruit is a rounded, flattened nut. This plant flowers from July to September in northern temperate regions.

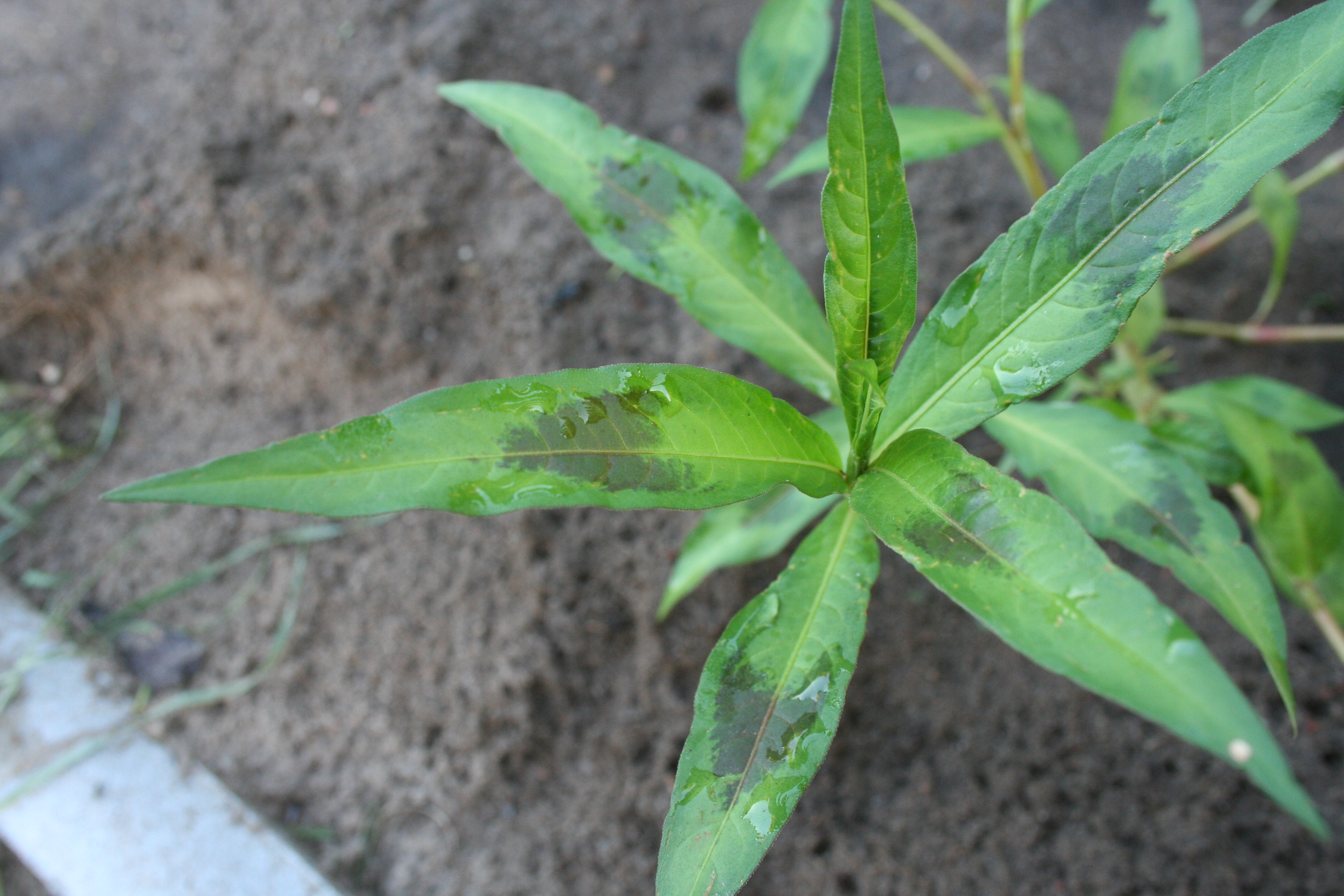
pale persicaria (Persicaria lapathifolia)

== Taxonomy ==
Persicaria lapathifolia was given the scientific name Polygonum lapathifolium by Carl Linnaeus in 1753. It was moved to the Persicaria genus in 1800 by Antoine Delarbre, who slightly modified the species name. The botanist Carl Meissner published a description of it as a variety of Polygonum persicaria named lapathifolium in 1826, but this did not become accepted. Alongside the rest of its genus, the species is part of the Polygonaceae family. It has 172 synonyms according to Plants of the World Online, including 79 species names, 33 subspecies, 49 varieties, and many other names at other ranks.

== Distribution and habitat ==
Persicaria lapathifolia is found in many parts of both the Old World and New World. Many varietal and sub-specific names have been coined, as the plant is morphologically variable. The species is found growing on the sea shore and in disturbed ground such as arable land, gardens, waste ground, rubbish tips and road verges.

== Cuisine ==
It has been found in analysis of the intestinal contents of the Tollund Man body, found in peat in Denmark in 1950.
