= The Sea Lady (Drabble novel) =

- First UK edition
- Author: Margaret Drabble
- Language: English
- Publisher: Penguin (UK/Australia); Houghton Mifflin Harcourt (US); McClelland & Stewart (Canada)
- Publication date: 2006
- Pages: 345
- ISBN: 978-0-15-101263-3

The Sea Lady is a 2006 novel written by the English author Margaret Drabble.
