= A Summer Bird-Cage =

Margaret Drabble novel

- First edition book cover
- Author: Margaret Drabble
- Publisher: Weidenfeld & Nicolson
- Publication date: January 1, 1963

A Summer Bird-Cage is the 1963 debut novel by Margaret Drabble published by Weidenfeld & Nicolson. The title of the novel is taken from a quotation from the play The White Devil by John Webster:

‘"Tis just like a summer bird-cage in a garden: the birds that are without despair to get in, and the birds within despair and are in a consumption for fear they shall never get out."

== Content ==
The novel centres on two characters who are sisters, Sarah and Louise. At the beginning of the story Sarah (who has recently graduated from Oxford University) has returned from Paris in order to be a bridesmaid at the wedding of Louise to the wealthy novelist Stephen Halifax. Sarah is at a transitional stage in her life and is not sure what she wants to do after her recent university degree. She is in a state of limbo, waiting for the man that she is in love with (Francis, a historian) to return from Harvard. The action pivots on the tensions between the two sisters, written from the perspective of Sarah who believes that Halifax is arrogant (an arrogance shared by her sister, in her view, which leads to profound friction between them). To complicate the picture, it becomes clear to Sarah during the course of the novel that Louise is having an affair with actor John Connell. The friction between the sisters leads, eventually, to Sarah confronting Louise about the state of her life and attitudes to the world and other people. The book does not involve an enormous amount of action in terms of plot. The focus is rather upon an exploration of the two women's characters and personalities and the way in which they affect each other.
