= The Radiant Way =

Margaret Drabble novel

- First edition publ. Weidenfeld and Nicolson
- Author: Margaret Drabble
- Language: English
- Publication date: 1987

The Radiant Way is a 1987 novel by British novelist Margaret Drabble. The novel provides social commentary and critique of 1980s Britain, by exploring the lives of three Cambridge-educated women with careers as knowledge professionals.

== Plot summary ==
The novel opens on New Year's Eve in 1979 as Liz Headleand, a psychologist, prepares to host a party. She is married to a successful television executive and widower, Charles, and lives in a large house with her husband and nearly adult children. She has invited her two friends from her university days in Cambridge, whom she still regularly sees: Esther Breuer, a writer and lecturer on obscure historical artefacts, and Alix Bowen, who is teaching English literature to female prisoners. The novel follows these three women over the next seven years of their lives.

Though relatively uneventful, during the party Liz realises that her husband, who is about to move to the USA for a new job, has been having an affair and plans on leaving her; he confirms this at the end of the party.

A lot of the novel explores British cultural life through these three characters, while in the background a serial killer is operating in London, unnerving the three women as they transit through the city.

Alix, who was widowed at a young age with a small baby, has struggled financially and socially for years, finally marrying an English lecturer at a polytechnic. Although she enjoys her work at the prison, one of the inmates, Jilly Fox, fixates on Alix.

Esther, an academic, is content to continue her study of the obscure artefacts, living in a flat that reflects her personality and lifestyle, and is slightly perplexed by the modernising world.

Liz's mother, who still lives in the family home in the North, falls ill and is hospitalised, sparking a confrontation between Liz and her sister, Shirley. While Liz has moved up in social strata through gaining entry to Cambridge and entering a profession, Shirley has remained in her home town, married and become a housewife, and now feels abandoned, spending years caring for their cold and distant mother.

Jilly constantly tries to see and contact Alix after she is released. Despite resisting contact, Alix finally relents and sees Jilly, only for the unstable young woman to be a victim of the serial killer by the next morning.

There is the brief possibility of a romance when Liz is introduced to Stephen Cox, a novelist and journalist who is currently writing a play about Pol Pot. Although the romance is not consummated, the pair enjoy seeing each other regularly.

Charles' affair and his job in the USA run their course, and he returns to London, with there being potential for a reconciliation with Liz. Charles reflects on his early career of making documentaries with a social message; his most groundbreaking, The Radiant Way, was a documentary about education for the working class. He tries to map when he 'sold out,' after one of his former collaborators is taken hostage and executed overseas.

The trio, Liz, Alix and Esther, are having dinner at Esther's flat one evening when police appear in the street outside. The trio are telephoned and asked to stay where they are, as Esther's upstairs neighbour is arrested—he is the serial killer. Liz's mother finally dies, and she and her sister reconcile while packing up the house, where neither wants to live.

== Reception ==
Kirkus Reviews reviews was mildly critical of the novel's tendency for exposition but writes "On the whole, however, this is one of the best of Drabble's books, immersing the reader in a credible, relevant world."

Writing in The New Criterion, Donna Rifkind describes the novel as a continuation of "constraining sameness [in her other works] which keeps Drabble as a writer wandering around the same circle, treading the same ground."
