= Margaret Drabble =

English writer (born 1939)

Dame Margaret Drabble DBE FRSL
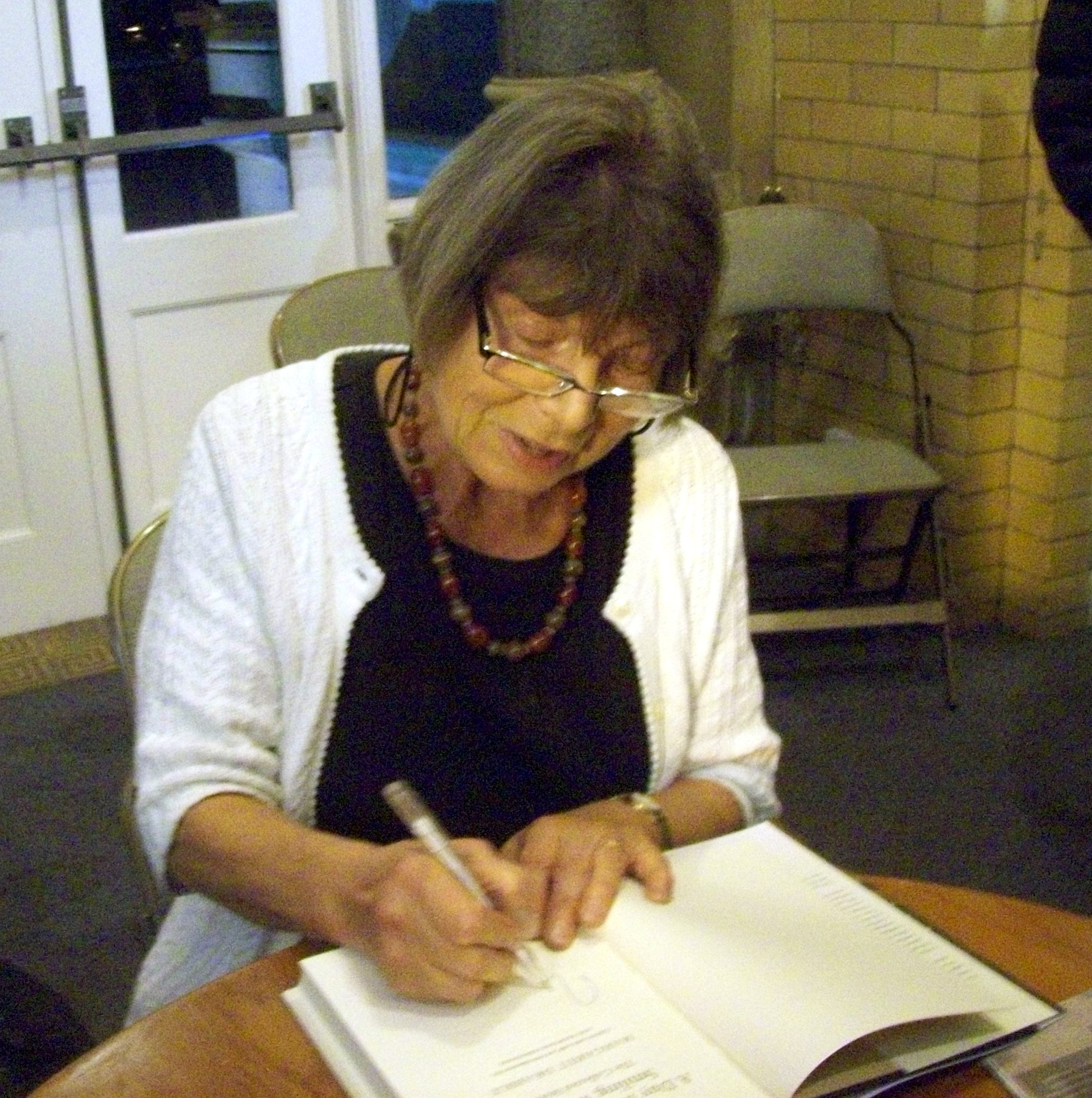
- Drabble in 2011
- Born: 5 June 1939 (age 87); Sheffield, West Riding of Yorkshire, England
- Education: Newnham College, University of Cambridge
- Occupations: Biographer; novelist; short story writer
- Spouses: Clive Swift (m. 1960; div. 1975); Michael Holroyd (m. 1982)
- Children: Adam Swift; Rebecca Swift; Joe Swift
- Relatives: A. S. Byatt (sister)
- Writing career
- Years active: 1963–
- Notable works: A Summer Bird-Cage; The Garrick Year; The Millstone; Jerusalem the Golden; The Needle's Eye
- Notable awards: John Llewellyn Rhys Memorial Prize; 1966; James Tait Black Memorial Prize; 1967; The Yorkshire Post Book Award (Finest Fiction); 1972; American Academy of Arts and Letters E. M. Forster Award; 1973; Golden PEN Award; 2011

Dame Margaret Drabble, Lady Holroyd (born 5 June 1939) is an English biographer, novelist and short story writer. Drabble's books include The Millstone (1965), which won the following year's John Llewellyn Rhys Memorial Prize, and Jerusalem the Golden, which won the 1967 James Tait Black Memorial Prize.

Drabble was honoured by the University of Cambridge in 2006, having earlier received awards from numerous redbrick (e.g. Sheffield, Hull, Manchester,) and plateglass universities (such as Bradford, Keele, East Anglia and York). She received the American Academy of Arts and Letters E. M. Forster Award in 1973. Drabble also wrote biographies of Arnold Bennett and Angus Wilson and edited two editions of The Oxford Companion to English Literature and a book on Thomas Hardy.

== Early life ==
Drabble was born in Sheffield, the second daughter of the County Court judge and novelist John Frederick Drabble and the teacher Kathleen Marie (née Bloor). Her elder sister was the novelist and critic A. S. Byatt; the youngest sister is art historian Helen Langdon, and their brother is the barrister Richard Drabble, KC. Drabble's father, a Quaker, participated in the placement of Jewish refugees in Sheffield during the 1930s.

After attending The Mount School, a Quaker boarding school at York where her mother was employed, Drabble received a scholarship to Newnham College, Cambridge. She studied English Literature whilst attending Cambridge. She joined the Royal Shakespeare Company at Stratford-upon-Avon in 1960, and, before leaving to pursue a career in literary studies and writing, served as an understudy for Vanessa Redgrave and Diana Rigg.

== Personal life ==
Drabble was married to the actor Clive Swift between 1960 and 1975. They had three children, the gardener and TV personality Joe Swift; the academic Adam Swift; and Rebecca Swift (d. 2017), who ran The Literary Consultancy. In 1982, Drabble married the writer and biographer Sir Michael Holroyd; they live in London and Somerset.

Drabble's relationship with her sister A. S. Byatt was sometimes strained because of autobiographical elements in both their writing. While their relationship was not especially close and they did not read each other's books, Drabble described the situation as "normal sibling rivalry" and Byatt said it had been "terribly overstated by gossip columnists" and that the sisters "always have liked each other on the bottom line."

When sought out for interview by The Paris Review's Barbara Milton in 1978, Drabble was described as "smaller than one might expect from looking at her photographs. Her face is finer, prettier and younger, surprisingly young for someone who has produced so many books in the past sixteen years. Her eyes are very clear and attentive and they soften when she is amused, as she often is, by the questions themselves and her own train of thought". In the same interview she admitted there were three writers for whom she felt an "immense admiration": Angus Wilson, Saul Bellow and Doris Lessing.

=== Views on the 2003 invasion of Iraq ===
In the aftermath of the 2003 invasion of Iraq, Drabble wrote of the anticipated wave of anti-Americanism, saying: "My anti-Americanism has become almost uncontrollable. It has possessed me, like a disease. It rises up in my throat like acid reflux, that fashionable American sickness. I now loathe the United States and what it has done to Iraq and the rest of the helpless world", despite "remembering the many Americans that I know and respect." She wrote of her distress at images of the war, her objections to Jack Straw about the Guantanamo Bay detention camp and "American imperialism, American infantilism, and American triumphalism about victories it didn't even win."

She recalled George Orwell's words in Nineteen Eighty-Four about "the intoxication of power" and "the thrill of victory, the sensation of trampling on an enemy who is helpless. If you want a picture of the future, imagine a boot stamping on a human face – for ever." She closed by saying, "I hate feeling this hatred. I have to keep reminding myself that if Bush hadn't been (so narrowly) elected, we wouldn't be here, and none of this would have happened. There is another America. Long live the other America, and may this one pass away soon."

== Writing ==
Drabble's early novels were published by Weidenfeld & Nicolson (1963–87), while the publishers of her later works were Penguin, Viking and Canongate, and a recurring theme is the correlation between contemporary England's society and its people. Most of her protagonists are women and the realistic descriptions of her figures often derive from Drabble's personal experiences; thus, her first novels describe the life of young women during the 1960s and 1970s, for whom the conflict between motherhood and intellectual challenges is being brought into focus, while The Witch of Exmoor, published in 1996, shows the withdrawn existence of an elderly writer. As Hilary Mantel wrote in 1989: "Drabble's heroines have aged with her, becoming solid and sour, more prone to drink and swear; yet with each successive book their earnest, moral nature blossoms." Her characters' tragic faults reflect their political and economic situation. Drabble wrote novels, she claimed in 2011, "to keep myself company".

Her first novel, A Summer Bird-Cage, was published in 1963. She wrote it, she said, because she had just got married and "the children—I had one and was expecting another—and writing was such a convenient career to combine with having a family." With it she found her "informal first-person narrative voice", which she said was an unexpected discovery. She maintained this approach for her first three books, having "liberated myself from the neutral critical prose of the university essay", which she nevertheless admitted she had enjoyed writing.

Her second novel The Garrick Year, published in 1964, drew upon her theatrical experience. Her third novel, The Millstone, was published in 1965. About a woman with a baby, Drabble made her character unmarried so as to avoid having to write about marriage or the baby's father. She used the personal experience of one of her own children's diagnosis with a lesion (a hole in the heart) to inform her writing on the illness she gave the child. Indeed, Drabble herself wrote The Millstone whilst pregnant with her own child, that is, her third. On the book's fiftieth anniversary in 2015, Tessa Hadley described it as "the seminal 60s feminist novel that Doris Lessing's The Golden Notebook is always supposed to be." Drabble admitted, years after writing The Millstone: "I didn't realise until many years later that some of the medical details I invented were way off the mark."

Drabble's fourth novel, Jerusalem the Golden, was published in 1967. It is also about an English woman who, not unlike Drabble, is from the north of the country and is attending university in London. Her fifth novel, The Waterfall, was published in 1969. It is experimental. Drabble's sixth novel, The Needle's Eye, was published in 1972. It is about an heiress who gives away her inheritance. Her seventh novel The Realms of Gold, published in 1975, has a lady archaeologist as its central character. Her eighth novel The Ice Age, published in 1977, is set in 1970s England and the social and economic conditions of that time. Drabble's ninth novel The Middle Ground, published in 1980, has a lady journalist as its central character. Margaret Forster, normally one of her kinder reviewers, called The Middle Ground "not a novel but a sociological treatise."

Her eleventh novel, titled A Natural Curiosity, published in 1989, continues the story of characters from her tenth novel, titled The Radiant Way, which was published in 1987. Drabble apologised to her readers in a preface to A Natural Curiosity and said a sequel had been unintended. Her thirteenth novel The Witch of Exmoor, published in 1996, treats of contemporary Britain. Drabble's fourteenth novel The Peppered Moth, published in 2001, treats of a young girl growing up in a mining town in South Yorkshire and spans four generations of her family. Her fifteenth novel The Seven Sisters, published in 2002, is about a woman whose marriage has collapsed and off she goes to Italy. The Observer referred to part of her sixteenth novel, The Red Queen (published in 2004), as "psychodrabble", noting her claim in the book's preface that she is seeking "universal transcultural human characteristics". Ursula K. Le Guin compared Drabble's seventeenth novel, The Sea Lady (published in 2006), favourably with her earlier book The Needle's Eye. In 2009, Drabble announced she would cease to write fiction, for fear of "repeating herself". The same year, she published her memoir The Pattern in the Carpet: A Personal History with Jigsaws. In addition, two further novels would in fact follow: The Pure Gold Baby (2013), and The Dark Flood Rises (2016). Speaking in Belfast in 2024, Drabble was clear that The Dark Flood Rises was her final novel.

A Day in the Life of a Smiling Woman, a collection of the 14 short stories that Drabble published between 1966 and 2000, appeared in 2011. Drabble's other writing includes several screenplays, plays and short stories, as well as non-fiction such as A Writer's Britain: Landscape and Literature and biographies of Arnold Bennett and Angus Wilson. Her critical works include studies of William Wordsworth and Thomas Hardy. She edited two editions of The Oxford Companion to English Literature in 1985 and 2000.

Drabble served as chairman of the National Book League (now Booktrust) from 1980 until 1982.

== Awards and honours ==
Drabble was appointed Commander of the Order of the British Empire (CBE) in Elizabeth II's 1980 Birthday Honours, and was promoted to Dame Commander of the Order of the British Empire (DBE) in the 2008 Birthday Honours.

- 1966: John Llewellyn Rhys Memorial Prize, for The Millstone
- 1967: James Tait Black Memorial Prize, for Jerusalem the Golden
- 1972: The Yorkshire Post Book Award (Finest Fiction), for The Needle's Eye
- 1973: American Academy of Arts and Letters E. M. Forster Award
- 1973: Elected Fellow of the Royal Society of Literature
- 1976: Honorary doctorate from the University of Sheffield
- 1987: Honorary doctorate from the University of Manchester
- 1988: Honorary doctorate from the Keele University
- 1988: Honorary doctorate from the University of Bradford
- 1992: Honorary doctorate from the University of Hull
- 1994: Honorary doctorate from the University of East Anglia
- 1995: Honorary doctorate from the University of York
- 2003: St. Louis Literary Award, given by the Saint Louis University Library Associates
- 2006: Honorary Doctorate in Letters from the University of Cambridge
- 2011: Golden PEN Award by English PEN, for "a Lifetime's Distinguished Service to Literature"

== Bibliography ==
=== Novels ===
- A Summer Bird-Cage, Weidenfeld & Nicolson (1963) ISBN 978-0140026344
- The Garrick Year, Weidenfeld & Nicolson (1964) ISBN 978-0140025491
- The Millstone, Weidenfeld & Nicolson (1965) ISBN 978-0297178811
- Jerusalem the Golden, Weidenfeld & Nicolson (1967) ISBN 978-0297748106
- The Waterfall, Weidenfeld & Nicolson (1969) ISBN 978-0452260177
- The Needle's Eye, Weidenfeld & Nicolson (1972) ISBN 978-0156029353
- The Realms of Gold, Weidenfeld & Nicolson (1975) ISBN 978-0140043600
- The Ice Age, Weidenfeld & Nicolson (1977) ISBN 978-0140048049
- The Middle Ground, Weidenfeld & Nicolson (1980) ISBN 978-0140057454
- The Radiant Way, Weidenfeld & Nicolson (1987) ISBN 978-0140101683
- A Natural Curiosity, Viking (1989) ISBN 978-0140122282
- The Gates of Ivory, Viking (1991) ISBN 978-0140166033
- The Witch of Exmoor, Viking (1996) ISBN 978-0140261943
- The Peppered Moth, Viking (2001) ISBN 978-0140297164
- The Seven Sisters, Viking (2002) ISBN 978-0670913350
- The Red Queen, Viking (2004) ISBN 978-0141018164
- The Sea Lady, Penguin (2006) ISBN 978-0141027456
- The Pure Gold Baby, Canongate (2013) ISBN 978-1782111122
- The Dark Flood Rises, Canongate (2016) ISBN 978-1782118336

=== Short fiction ===
- The Gifts of War (1969), title story republished (alongside "Hassan's Tower") by Penguin Modern Classics on 24 February 2011 ISBN 978-0141195957
- "Hassan's Tower" (1980), published by Sylvester & Orphanos ISBN 978-0297769798
- A Day in the Life of a Smiling Woman: Complete Short Stories (2011) ISBN 978-0547737355

=== Non-fiction ===
- Wordsworth (Literature in Perspective series) (1966) ISBN 978-0668019439
- Arnold Bennett: A Biography (1974) ISBN 978-0571255092
- For Queen and Country: Britain in the Victorian Age (1978) from the 'Mirror of Britain' series André Deutsch ISBN 978-0233969398
- A Writer's Britain: Landscape in Literature (1979) ISBN 978-0500514931
- Stratford Revisited: A Legacy of the Sixties (1989) from the Gareth Lloyd Evans Shakespeare Lecture
- Angus Wilson: A Biography (1995) Secker & Warburg ISBN 978-0436200380
- The Pattern in the Carpet: A Personal History with Jigsaws (2009) ISBN 978-0547241449
- Flora McDonnell, ed., Threads of Hope: Learning to Live with Depression (Short Books, 2003, ISBN 978-1-904095-35-4), with contributions by Margaret Drabble, Wendy Cope, Andrew Solomon, Virginia Ironside, Lewis Wolpert, Alastair Campbell, and Kay Redfield Jamison

=== As editor ===
- London Consequences (1972) – also co-editor ISBN 978-0950244709
- The Genius of Thomas Hardy (1976) ISBN 978-0394495569
- The Oxford Companion to English Literature (5th and 6th editions) (1985, 2000) ISBN 978-0198614531

=== Critical studies and reviews of Drabble's work ===
- Rubenstein, Roberta (Spring 1994). "Fragmented bodies/selves/narratives: Margaret Drabble's postmodern turn". Contemporary Literature. 35 (1). University of Wisconsin Press: 136–155. doi:10.2307/1208739. JSTOR 1208739. (20 pages)
- Glenda Leeming. Margaret Drabble (Liverpool University Press; 2004, 2020) ISBN 9781786946546
