= The Needle's Eye (novel) =

Margaret Drabble novel

- First edition (publ. Weidenfeld & Nicolson)
- Author: Margaret Drabble
- Publisher: Weidenfeld & Nicolson
- Publication date: 1972
- ISBN: 9780394479668

The Needle's Eye is a 1972 novel by British novelist Margaret Drabble. The novel was well received by reviewers, like contemporary novelist Joyce Carol Oates. Though it was her sixth novel, Drabble described it as her first time that she could "actually write a novel" expressing what she wanted to write.

== Reception ==
Novelist Joyce Carol Oates gave a glowing review for the novel in the New York Times describing the novel as well surpassing the quality of her earlier works. Oates writes that The Needle's Eye was an "extraordinary work", transporting the reader into the "human and very extraordinary experience" of the characters.
