= 1981 in poetry =

Nationality words link to articles with information on the nation's poetry or literature (for instance, Irish or France).

== Events ==
- American poet Jane Greer launches Plains Poetry Journal, an advance guard of the New Formalism movement.
- Final issue of L=A=N=G=U=A=G=E magazine published in the United States.
- First issue of Conjunctions literary journal published in the United States.
- This year, "the word 'Martianism' comes into use, through the verse of Craig Raine and his associates, presenting a vision of life on Earth as seen by a visiting Martian," the 1982 Britannica Book of the Year reports (p. 504). Some note that "Martianism" is an anagram for one of Raine's associates, Martin Amis.

== Works published in English ==
Listed by nation where the work was first published and again by the poet's native land, if different; substantially revised works listed separately:

=== Australia ===
- R. Hall, editor, Collins Book of Australian Poetry, anthology
- H. Heseltine, editor, Penguin Book of Modern Australian Verse, anthology
- L. Kramer, Oxford History of Australian Literature (scholarship)
- Jennifer Maiden, For The Left Hand, South Head

=== Canada ===
- Margaret Atwood, True Stories
- Alfred Bailey, Miramichi Lightning: The Collected Poems.
- Roo Borson, A Sad Device, ISBN 0-86495-011-X, American-Canadian
- Louis Dudek, Continuation I. Montréal: Véhicule Press, 1981.
- Louis Dudek, Poems from Atlantis. Ottawa: Golden Dog, 1981.
- Robert Finch, Has and Is.
- Gwen Hauser, Gophers and Swans
- George Johnston:
  - Auk Redivivus: Selected Poems
  - Rocky Shores.
- Irving Layton, Europe And Other Bad News. Toronto: McClelland and Stewart.
- Dorothy Livesay, The Raw Edges: Voices from Our Time. Winnipeg: Turnstone Press.
- Gwendolyn MacEwen, Trojan Women. 1981.
- Jay Macpherson, Poems Twice Told: The Boatman & Welcoming Disaster. Toronto: Oxford University Press.
- Anne Marriott:
  - This West Shore, Toronto: League of Canadian Poets.
  - The Circular Coast: Poems New and Selected, Oakville, ON: Mosaic Press.
- George McWhirter, The Island Man
- P. K. Page, Evening Dance of the Grey Flies, poetry and prose
- Stephen Scobie, A Grand Memory For Forgetting
- Stephen Scobie and Douglas Barbour:
  - The Pirates of Pen's Chance: Homolinguistic Translations
  - The Maple Laugh Forever: An Anthology of Canadian Comic Poetry (Edmonton: Hurtig Publishers)
- F. R. Scott, The Collected Poems of F. R. Scott. Toronto: McClelland and Stewart. Governor General's Award 1981.
- Raymond Souster, Collected Poems of Raymond Souster, Volume Two, 1955-62

=== India, in English ===
- Keki N. Daruwalla, Winter Poems ( Poetry in English ), Bombay: Allied Publishers.
- Jayanta Mahapatra, Relationship ( Poetry in English ), winner of the Central Sahitya Akademi Awardin 1982; Cuttack: Chandrabhaga Society
- Pritish Nandy, editor, Indian Poetry in English Today, New Delhi: Sterling Publication Pvt. Ltd.

=== Ireland ===
- Dermot Bolger, Finglas Lilies
- Eiléan Ní Chuilleanáin: The Rose Geranium, Dublin: The Gallery Press
- Anthony Cronin, RMS Titanic
- Seamus Heaney, Selected Poems 1965-1975, Faber & Faber, Northern Ireland native published in the United Kingdom
- Michael Longley, Patchwork, Irish poet published in the United Kingdom
- Thomas McCarthy, The Sorrow Garden, Anvil Press, London, Irish poet published in the United Kingdom
- Derek Mahon:
  - Courtyards in Delft. Gallery Press
  - The Hunt by Night
- Christopher Nolan, Dam-Burst of Dreams

=== United Kingdom ===
- Dannie Abse, Way Out in the Centre
- Sir John Betjeman, Church Poems
- Alison Brackenbury, Dreams of Power
- Roberta Berke, Bounds out of Bounds: A Compass for Recent American and British Poetry, Oxford University Press, criticism
- Douglas Dunn, St. Kilda's Parliament
- D. J. Enright, Collected Poems
- James Fenton, Dead Soldiers, Sycamore Press,
- Roy Fisher, Consolidated Comedies
- Thom Gunn, Talbot Road
- Tony Harrison:
  - Continuous
  - A Kumquat for John Keats
- Seamus Heaney, Selected Poems 1965-1975, Faber & Faber, Northern Ireland native published in the United Kingdom
- John Heath-Stubbs:
  - Buzz Buzz
  - Editor, Selected Poems of Thomas Gray
- Ted Hughes:
  - Under the North Star
  - Editor, Collected Poems by Sylvia Plath (see Plath, below)
- Peter Levi, Private Ground
- Liz Lochhead, The Grimm Sisters
- Christopher Logue, Ode to the Dodo
- Michael Longley, Patchwork, Irish poet published in the United Kingdom
- Derek Mahon:
  - Courtyards in Delft. Gallery Press
  - The Hunt by Night
- Andrew Motion, Independence
- Norman Nicholson, Sea to the West
- Brian Patten, Love Poems
- Tom Paulin, The Book of Juniper
- Sylvia Plath, Collected Poems, posthumous, containing 224 poems in chronological order, edited by Ted Hughes; poems by an American, edited by her English husband
- Peter Porter, English Subtitles
- Peter Reading, Tom O'Bedlam's Beauties
- Peter Redgrove, The Apple Broadcast, and Other New Poems
- Carol Rumens, Unplayed Music
- Elizabeth Smart, Ten Poems
- D. M. Thomas, Dreaming in Bronze
- R. S. Thomas, Between Here and Now
- The Faber Book of Christian Verse

=== United States ===
- A.R. Ammons, A Coast of Trees
- John Ashbery, Shadow Train
- Imamu Amiri Baraka, formerly "LeRoi Jones", Reggae or Not!
- Ted Berrigan, In a Blue River
- Robert Bly, The Man in the Black Coat Turns
- Paul Bowles, Next to Nothing: Collected Poems 1926–1977
- Joseph Payne Brennan, Creep To Death
- Joseph Brodsky: Verses on the Winter Campaign 1980, translation by Alan Meyers. – London: Anvil Press Russian-American
- Gwendolyn Brooks:
  - Black Love
  - To Disembark
- Jared Carter, Work, for the Night Is Coming
- Gregory Corso, Herald of the Autochthonic Spirit, his first collection in 11 years
- Peter Davison, Barn Fever and Other Poems
- Lawrence Ferlinghetti, Endless Life: Selected Poems
- Carolyn Forche, The Country Between Us
- Daryl Hine, Selected Poems
- John Hollander:
  - Rhyme's Reason: A Guide to English Verse, poetry
  - The Figure of Echo
- Janet Kauffman, The Weather Book
- Denise Levertov, Light Up the Cave
- Philip Levine, One for the Rose
- Frederick Morgan, Northbook
- Michael Palmer, Notes For Echo Lake (North Point Press)
- Sylvia Plath, The Collected Poems of Sylvia Plath, Ted Hughes, editor, containing 224 poems in chronological order (posthumous)
- Marie Ponsot, Admit Impediment
- Michael Ryan, In Winter (Holt)
- Anne Sexton, The Complete Poems, published posthumously (died 1974)
- Leslie Marmon Silko, Storyteller, short stories, poems and photographs
- Shel Silverstein, A Light in the Attic a collection of children's poetry
- Gilbert Sorrentino, Selected Poems 1958-1980
- Gerald Stern, The Red Coal
- Robert Stone, A Flag for Sunrise
- Mark Strand, The Planet of Lost Things
- Richard L. Tierney, Collected Poems
- Michael Van Walleghen, More Trouble With the Obvious
- David Wagoner, Landfall
- Rosmarie Waldrop, Nothing Has Changed (Awede Press)
- Diane Wakoski, The Magician's Feastletters
- Robert Penn Warren, Rumor Verified: Poems 1979-1980
- Richard Wilbur, Seven Poems
- Nancy Willard, A Visit to William Blake's Inn, illustrated by Alice and Martin Provensen

==== Criticism, scholarship and biography in the United States ====
- Colin Robert Chase, The Dating of Beowulf
- John Hollander:
  - Rhyme's Reason: A Guide to English Verse, criticism
  - The Figure of Echo, criticism

=== Other in English ===
- Alistair Campbell, Collected Poems, Hazard, ISBN 1-877393-00-2, New Zealand
- C. K. Stead, In the Glass Case, criticism, New Zealand

== Works published in other languages ==
Listed by language and often by nation where the work was first published and again by the poet's native land, if different; substantially revised works listed separately:

=== Denmark ===
- Inger Christensen, Alphabet (Alfabet), translated into English by Susanna Nied in 2001
- Klaus Høeck:
  - Canzone, publisher: Gyldendal
  - Sorte sonetter, publisher: Gyldendal
- Søren Ulrik Thomsen, City Slang

=== French language ===
==== Canada, in French ====
- Pierre Nepveu, editor, La poésie québécoise, des origines à nos jours, en collaboration avec Laurent Mailhot, Montréal: Presses de l'Université du Québec/l'Hexagone, anthology
- Madeleine Ouellette-Michalska, Entre le souffle et l'aine, Saint-Lambert: Le Noroît
- Jean Royer, L'intime soif, Montréal: Éditions du silence

==== France ====
- Alain Bosquet:
  - Poèmes, deux
  - Sonnets pour une fin de siècle
- Jean Cayrol, Poésie-Journal
- Michel Deguy, Donnant Donnant
- Emmanuel Hocquard, Une ville ou une petite ile
- Abdellatif Laabi, Sous le bâillon le poème. L'Harmattan, Paris, Moroccan author writing in and published in France
- Charles le Quintrec, La Lumière et l'argile
- Jacques Roubaud, Dors
- Jacques Roubaud and Florence Delay, Merlin l'enchanteur

=== German ===
- Christoph Buchwald, general editor, and Rolf Haufs, guest editor, Jahrbuch der Lyrik 3 ("Poetry Yearbook 3"), publisher: Claassen; anthology
- V. Hage, editor, Lyrik für Leser: Deutsche Gedichte der siebziger Jahre, anthology
- Heinz Toni Hamm, Poesie und kommunikative Praxis (scholarship)
- Klaus Weissenberger, editor, Die deutsche Lyrik, 1945-1975 (scholarship)

=== Hebrew ===
- A. Hillel, Devareiy
- Gabriel Preil, a new collection
- Avot Yeshurun, a new collection
- S. Shalom, a new collection
- Yehuda Amichai, Shalva gedola, she'elot uteshuvot
- Robert Whitehill, Efes Makom ("No Place"), published in Israel
- Peretz Banai, a "new poet"
- Esther Ettinger, a "new poet"
- Yosef Yehezkel, a "new poet"
- Aharon Shabtai, Xut ("Thread")
- Mordecai Geldman, a new collection
- Hannah Barzilai, a new collection
- Batsheva Sharif, a new collection
- Michael Senunit, a new collection
- Menachem Ben, a new collection

=== Hungary ===
- György Petri, Örökhétfő

=== India ===
Listed in alphabetical order by first name:

- Hari Daryani, Amar Gitu, a verse translation into Sindhi of (and commentary on) the Gita
- K. G. Sankara Pillai, Kavitha, Thiruvananthapuram, Kerala: Kerala Kavita; Malayalam-language
- K. Satchidanandan, Peedana Kalam, ("Times of Torment"); Malayalam-language
- Namdeo Dhasal; Marathi-language:
  - Tuhi Iyatta Kanchi?, Mumbai: Ambedkara Prabodhini
  - Ambedkari Chalwal, Mumbai: Ambedkara Prabodhini
- Nilmani Phookan, Gacia Larkar Kavita, Guwahati, Assam: Bani Prakash, Assamese-language
- Nirendranath Chakravarti, Pagla Ghonti, Kolkata: Dey’s Publishing; Bengali-language
- Parsram Rohra "Nimano", Sindhi-language
- Pritish Nandy and Shakti Chattopadhyay, Pritisa Nandira kabita, Kalikata: Ananda Pabalisarsa
- Rajendra Kishore Panda, Choukathhare Chirakala, Cuttack: Friends Publishers, Oraya-language
- Rituraj, Pul aur Pani, New Delhi: Rajkamal Prakashan; Hindi-language
- Umashankur Joshi, Gujarati-language:
  - Dharavastra
  - Saptapadi
- Vinod Kumar Shukla, Vah Aadmi Chala Gaya Naya Garam Coat Pehankar Vichar Ki Tarah, Hapur: Sambhavna Prakashan; Hindi-language
- Udaya Narayana Singh, Anuttaran, Calcutta: Mithila Darshan, Maithili-language
- Mehr Lal Soni Zia Fatehabadi, Rang-o-Noor (The Colour and the Light) - published by R.K.Sehgal, Bazm-e-Seemab, New Delhi, Urdu

=== Italy ===
- Eugenio Montale, L'opera in versi
- Carlo Betocchi, Poesie del sabato
- Eugenio Montale, Altri verse e poesie disperse (originally published in 1980 under the title L'opera in versi), Milan: Arnaldo Mondadore Editore; Italy
- Maria Luisa Spaziani, Geometria del disordine
- Giovanni Guidici, Il ristorante dei morti
- Amelia Rosselli:
  - Primi scritti 1952-1965
  - Impromptu

=== Poland ===
- Stanisław Barańczak, Ksiazki najgorsze 1975-1980 ("The Worst Books"), criticism; Kraków: KOS
- T. Kostkiewiczowa and Z. Goliński, editors, Swiat polprawiac—zuchwate rzemiosto, anthology
- Ryszard Krynicki, Niewiele więcej. Wiersze z notatnika 78-79 ("Not Much More. Poems From the Notebook 78-79"); Kraków: Cracowska Oficyna Studentow
- Ewa Lipska, Poezje wybrane ("Selected Poems"), Warszawa: LSW
- Bronisław Maj, Taka wolność. Wiersze z lat 1971-1975 ("Such Freedom: Poems, 1971-1975"); Warsaw: MAW
- Piotr Sommer, Przed snem

=== Portuguese language ===
==== Portugal ====
- Herberto Helder, Poesia Toda
- A. Pinheiro Torre, O Ressentimento dum Ocidental

==== Brazil ====
- Carlos Drummond de Andrade, A paixão medida
- João Cabral de Melo Neto, A escola das faces
- Adélia Prado, Terra de Santa Cruz
- Mário da Silva, several volumes of poetry

=== Spanish language ===
==== Spain ====
- Antonio Abad, Misericor de mí
- Matilde Camus:
  - He seguido tus huellas ("I have followed your footprints")
  - Testigo de tu marcha ("Witness of your departure")
- Concha Lagos, Teoría de la inseguridad
- Vincente Presa, Teoría de los límites
- Pablo Virumbrales, Cancionero del vaso

==== Latin America ====
- Mario Benedetti, Viento del exilio ("Air From Exile"), Uruguay

=== Swedish ===
- Karl Vennberg, Bilder I-XXVI
- Goran Sonnevi, Små klanger; en rőst
- Eva Runefelt, Augusti

=== Yiddish ===
==== Criticism, scholarship and biography in Yiddish ====
- Itzhak Yanasowicz, Avrom Sutzkever, His Poetry and Prose
- The Lexicon of Modern Yiddish Literature, the eighth and final volume
- Chaim Leib Fox, Biographical Dictionary of Hebrew and Yiddish Writers in Canada

=== Other ===
- Chen Kehua, Qijing shaonian ("Whale Boy") Chinese (Taiwan)
- Rita Kelly, Dialann sa Díseart, Ireland
- Luo Fu, Wound of Time, Chinese (Taiwan)
- Stein Mehren, Den usynlige regnbuen, Norway
- Alexander Mezhirov, Selected Works, two volumes, Russia, Soviet Union
- Nuala Ní Dhomhnaill, An dealg Droighin, including "Sceala" and "Failte Bheal na Sionna don Iasc", Gaelic-language, Ireland
- Nizar Qabbani, Syrian poet writing in Arabic:
  - I Write the History of Woman Like So
  - The Lover's Dictionary

== Awards and honors ==
=== Australia ===
- Kenneth Slessor Prize for Poetry: Alan Gould, Astral Sea

=== Canada ===
- Gerald Lampert Award: Elizabeth Allan, The Shored Up House
- 1981 Governor General's Awards: F. R. Scott, The Collected Poems of F. R. Scott (English); Michel Beaulieu, Visages (French)
- Pat Lowther Award: M. Travis Lane, Divinations and Short Poems 1973–1978
- Prix Émile-Nelligan: Jean-Yves Collette, La Mort d’André Breton

=== United Kingdom ===
- Cholmondeley Award: Roy Fisher, Robert Garioch, Charles Boyle
- Eric Gregory Award: Alan Jenkins, Simon Rae, Marion Lomax, Philip Gross, Kathleen Jamie, Mark Abley, Roger Crowley, Ian Gregson
- Queen's Gold Medal for Poetry: D. J. Enright
- Hawthornden Prize: Christopher Reid

=== United States ===
- Agnes Lynch Starrett Poetry Prize: Kathy Callaway, Heart of the Garfish
- AML Award for poetry to Robert A. Rees for "Gilead"
- Bernard F. Connors Prize for Poetry: Frank Bidart, "The War of Vaslav Nijinsky"
- Bollingen Prize (United States): Howard Nemerov and May Swenson
- Consultant in Poetry to the Library of Congress (later the post would be called "Poet Laureate Consultant in Poetry to the Library of Congress"): Maxine Kumin appointed this year.
- MacArthur Fellowships: A.R. Ammons, Joseph Brodsky, Robert Penn Warren
- National Book Award for poetry (United States): Lisel Mueller, The Need to Hold Still
- National Book Critics Circle Award for Poetry: A.R. Ammons, A Coast of Trees (Norton)
- Poet Laureate Consultant in Poetry to the Library of Congress: Maxine Kumin appointed
- Pulitzer Prize for Poetry: James Schuyler: The Morning of the Poem
- Rhysling Award:
  - Thomas M. Disch, On Science Fiction (Long Form)
  - Ken Duffin, Meeting Place (Short Form)
- Fellowship of the Academy of American Poets: Richard Hugo
- Walt Whitman Award: Alberto Ríos, Whispering to Fool the Wind (Sheep Meadow Press) Judge: Donald Justice

== Births ==
- April 6 – Marie Šťastná, Czech poet
- Emily Berry, English poet
- Yirgalem Fisseha Mebrahtu, Eritrean poet
- Doireann Ní Ghríofa, Irish-language poet

== Deaths ==
Birth years link to the corresponding "[year] in poetry" article:

- January 29 – John Glassco (born 1909), Canadian poet, memoirist and novelist
- February 23 – Nan Shepherd (born 1893), Scottish novelist and poet
- March 15 – Horiguchi Daigaku 堀口 大学 (born 1892), Japanese, Taishō and Shōwa period poet and translator of French literature; a member of the Shinshisha ("The New Poetry Society"); accompanied his father on overseas diplomatic postings
- April 25 – Takis Sinopoulos (born 1917), Greek
- April 26 – Robert Garioch (born 1909), Scots language Scottish poet and translator
- April 29 – Leonard Mann (born 1895), Australian
- April 30 – Peter Huchel (born 1903), German
- May 8 – Uri Zvi Grinberg (born 1896), Jewish
- May 31 – Falguni Ray (born 1945), Bengali poet and youngest member of Hungryalism movement
- June 14 – Hayyim Schirmann (born 1904), Russian-born Israeli professor of medieval Spanish Jewish poetry
- August 19 – Badawi al-Jabal (born 1905 or 1907), Syrian Arab
- August 27 – James Larkin Pearson (born 1879), American poet, newspaper publisher; North Carolina Poet Laureate, 1953–1981
- September 12 – Eugenio Montale, 85, Italian poet, prose writer, editor and translator, winner of the Nobel Prize for Literature in 1975
- October 26 – Marie Uguay, 26 (born 1955), French-Canadian), from bone cancer
- October 30 – Georges Brassens (born 1921), French singer-songwriter and poet
- November 14 – Anton Podbevšek (born 1898), Slovene avant-garde poet
- Also:
  - Adolf Beiss (born 1900), German
  - Ada Verdun Howell (born 1902), Australian

== See also ==
- Poetry
- List of years in poetry
- List of poetry awards

== Notes ==
- Britannica Book of the Year 1982 ("for events of 1981"), published by Encyclopædia Britannica 1982 (source of many items in "Works published" section and rarely in other sections)
