= Robert Whitehill =

Robert Whitehill may refer to:

- Robert Whitehill (politician) (1738–1813), US Representative from Pennsylvania
- Robert Whitehill (poet) (born 1947), American Hebrew poet
