= St. Mary's Church, Bellaghy =

St. Mary's Church
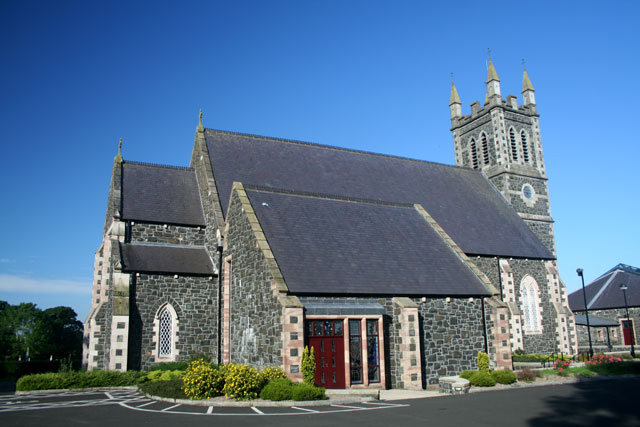
- St. Mary's Church
- 54°48′53.1″N 6°30′50.4″W
- Address: 25 Ballynease Rd, Bellaghy, Magherafelt BT45 8JS
- Country: Northern Ireland
- Denomination: Roman Catholic
- Website: bellaghyparish.com

History
- Status: Parish church

Administration
- Parish: Bellaghy–Ballyscullion Parish

St. Mary's Church is a Roman Catholic church in Bellaghy, County Londonderry, Northern Ireland. It is the final resting place of Nobel Prize in Literature laureate Seamus Heaney. It is also the place where IRA hunger-strikers Francis Hughes and Thomas McElwee are buried.
