= Dennis O'Driscoll =

Irish poet, essayist, critic and editor (1954–2012)

- Born: 1 January 1954; Thurles, County Tipperary, Ireland
- Died: 24 December 2012 (aged 58); Naas, County Kildare, Ireland
- Occupation: Writer
- Spouse: Julie O'Callaghan
- Writing career
- Genres: Poem, essay
- Notable awards: Lannan Literary Award; E. M. Forster Award

Dennis O'Driscoll (1 January 1954 – 24 December 2012) was an Irish poet, essayist, critic and editor. Regarded as one of the best European poets of his time, Eileen Battersby considered him "the lyric equivalent of William Trevor" and a better poet "by far" than Raymond Carver. Gerard Smyth regarded him as "one of poetry's true champions and certainly its most prodigious archivist. His book on Seamus Heaney is regarded as the definitive biography of the Nobel laureate.

== Life and career ==
Born on 1 January 1954 in Thurles, County Tipperary, Ireland, O'Driscoll was the child of James O'Driscoll and Catherine Lahart, a salesman/horticulturist and a homemaker. He was educated by the Congregation of Christian Brothers. After completing his secondary education in 1970, aged 16, O'Driscoll was offered a job at Ireland's Office of the Revenue Commissioners the internal revenue and customs service. Specializing in "death duties, stamp duties, and customs", he was employed for over thirty years full-time. He lived in Naas, County Kildare, until his sudden death.

In the 1970s and '80s, O'Driscoll held many part-time jobs and positions in association with his writing. He took a position as part-time editor of Tax Briefing, a technical journal produced in Ireland, as well as reviewing poetry for Hibernia and The Crane Bag. He also served on the council of the Irish United Nations Association from 1975 to 1980. After this, he married Julie O'Callaghan, a writer, in September 1985. O'Driscoll stayed in the revenue business for as long as he did due to the advice of a colleague, who told him: "If you ever leave your job, you will stop writing." Thus, revenue became a sort of fall-back option for him, a career that paid regularly and provided a pension, whereas poetry was his art. Even so, in his memoir entitled Sing for the Taxman, O'Driscoll states: "I have always regarded myself as a civil servant rather than a 'poet' or 'artist' – words I would find embarrassing and presumptuous to ascribe to myself."

After 38 years in Revenue, in early 2008, O'Driscoll was asked to write a poem marking the opening of the Revenue Museum in Dublin Castle, marking the first time his job and his art would intermingle. This poem, "At The Revenue Museum", which was originally brought to life to be printed in a programme for the opening ceremony, now hangs as an exhibit in the museum itself.

O'Driscoll died suddenly at the age of 58 over the 2012 Christmas period. He was rushed to hospital after becoming ill but quickly succumbed to his fate. The arts world was shocked by his sudden demise. His wife, the poet Julie O'Callaghan, and siblings – brothers Proinsias, Seamus, Declan, and sisters, Marie and Eithne – survived him.

President Michael D. Higgins noted that O'Driscoll was "held in the highest regard not only by all those associated with Irish and European poetry". Joe Duffy, with whom O'Driscoll had appeared on air on the very week of his death, called O'Driscoll a "generous, caring and witty man". Fellow writer Belinda McKeon said he was "a scholar, a gentleman, a character, a friend". English critic David Morley described him as a "fine poet and great critic". Irish PEN mourned his death.

== Literary activities ==
Prior to the publication of his own poems, O'Driscoll published widely in journals and other print publications as both an essayist and poetry reviewer, for which he was very widely known. The Times Literary Supplement called him "one of Ireland's most respected critics of poetry." During this time he contributed upwards of two-hundred essays and reviews to various publications. O'Driscoll was published in Poetry, The London Magazine, Harvard Review, The Southern Review, Narrative Magazine, and Poetry Review, and was invited to give readings of his work in the Poetry Room in Harvard University, the Poetry International in London as well as the Hay-on-Wye and Cheltenham festivals of literature.

O'Driscoll wrote nine books of poetry, three chapbooks, and two collections of essays and reviews. The majority of his works were characterised by the use of economic language and the recurring motifs of mortality and the fragility of everyday life. As he aged, O'Driscoll's works became more fluid and thoughtful as well as more frequent, and, according to some sources, like Alan Brownjohn of The Sunday Times for instance, even though he is younger than some of the poetic greats, "at best he is already their equal." Originally published as a pamphlet, his sonnet poem "The Bottom Line" is considered his hallmark work.

In 1987, he temporarily became a writer-in-residence at the National University of Ireland. He has also served as editor of Poetry Ireland Review, as well as of two textbook anthologies entitled The Bloodaxe Book of Poetry, and Quote Poet Unquote.

O'Driscoll published a collection of literary criticism entitled Troubled Thoughts, Majestic Dreams, which contains a selection of his essays and reviews. A new collection of his essays, The Outnumbered Poet from Gallery Press was published in 2013. Stepping Stones: Interviews with Seamus Heaney, an acclaimed 500-page volume of his interviews with 1995 Nobel Prize in Literature recipient, Seamus Heaney, was published in 2008. He served as a judge for the Griffin Poetry Prize in 2009. He was the editor of A Michael Hamburger Reader, published by Anvil Press in 2013.

== List of works ==
=== Poetry collections ===
- Kist (Dolmen Press, 1982)
- Hidden Extras (Anvil Press Poetry, London/Dedalus Press, Dublin, 1987)
- Long Story Short (Anvil Press Poetry/Dedalus Press, 1993)
- Quality Time (Anvil Press Poetry, 1997)
- Weather Permitting (Anvil Press Poetry, 1999), which was a Poetry Book Society Recommendation and shortlisted for the Irish Times Poetry Prize 2001
- Exemplary Damages (Anvil Press Poetry, 2002)
- New and Selected Poems (Anvil Press Poetry, 2004) was a Poetry Book Society Special Commendation
- Reality Check (Anvil Press Poetry, 2007/ Copper Canyon Press, US, 2008), was shortlisted for the Irish Times/Poetry Now Prize
- Dear Life (Anvil Press Poetry, 2012/ Copper Canyon Press, US, 2013).
- Update (Copper Canyon Press, US, 2015)

=== Poetry chapbooks ===
- The Bottom Line (Dedalus Editions, 1994)
- 50 O'Clock (Happy Dragons' Press, UK, 2005)[4]
- All the Living (Traffic Street Press, Minnesota, 2008).

=== Prose ===
- Troubled Thoughts, Majestic Dreams: Selected Prose Writings (Gallery Press, 2001).
- The Bloodaxe Book of Poetry Quotations (Bloodaxe Books, 2006).
- Quote Poet Unquote: Contemporary Quotations on Poets and Poetry (Copper Canyon Press, US, 2008).
- Stepping Stones: Interviews with Seamus Heaney (Faber and Faber, UK, 2008).
- The Outnumbered Poet: Critical and Autobiographical Essays (Gallery Press, 2013).

== Awards and honours ==
- Lannan Literary Award
- E. M. Forster Award of the American Academy of Arts and Letters
- O'Shaughnessy Award for Poetry from the Center of Irish Studies in Minnesota
- Poetry Book Society Special Commendation for New and Selected Poems
- Shortlisted for The Irish Times Poetry Now Award 2008 for Reality Check
- Winner of The Irish Times Poetry Now Award 2013 for Dear Life (posthumous)
- Argosy Irish Non-Fiction Book of the Year Award
- Honorary doctorate in literature by University College, Dublin
