= Stepping Stones: Interviews with Seamus Heaney =

2008 book about Seamus Heaney

- 2009 paperback ed
- Author: Dennis O'Driscoll
- Publisher: Faber and Faber
- Publication date: 2008
- ISBN: 9780374269838

Stepping Stones: Interviews with Seamus Heaney is Dennis O'Driscoll's book-length portrait of Seamus Heaney, recipient of the 1995 Nobel Prize in Literature. It has been described as the nearest thing in existence to an autobiography of Heaney.

O'Driscoll, who died on Christmas Eve 2012, was a poet, a friend of Heaney's and a student of his poetry. The book is full of their conversations on poetry, life and so on. It was first published in 2008 by Faber and Faber (ISBN 9780374269838).

The book also features a number of photographs published for the first time. Extracts have been used during school examinations.
