= Finders Keepers (Heaney collection) =

2001 book by Seamus Heaney

- Author: Seamus Heaney
- Language: English
- Genre: Non-fiction
- Publisher: Faber and Faber
- Publication date: May 1, 2001
- Pages: 432
- ISBN: 0-374-15496-1

Finders Keepers: Selected Prose 1971–2001 is a 2001 collection of prose by Seamus Heaney, published by Faber and Faber. It features reprints from earlier Heaney collections, and several works previously published in newspapers, as lectures, or contributions to books.

== Conception ==
In the preface, Heaney states his editor, Paul Keegan, encouraged him to create the book. Numerous essays in the book were previously published in earlier collections, namely 1980 Preoccupations, 1988 The Government of the Tongue, 1995 The Redress of Poetry, and the 1989 collection of "Richard Ellmann Lectures in Modern Literature" given in Emory University titled The Place of Writing. He also collected revised and abridged works he wrote for newspapers, some uncollected lectures, and various contributions to books he did over the years.

The title, Finders Keepers, is from the adage of the same name, which Heaney compares the excitement of a child finding something new and interesting to the excitement he had when writing the pieces in the book.

== Contents ==
Heaney describes the book as sectioned much like Preoccupations: the first part is autobiographical or topical, the second of a pure literary focus, and the last section contains miscellaneous work which he describes is like "a kite's tail". Further linking Finders Keepers with Preoccupations, he quotes in the preface:

The essays selected here are held together by searches for answers to central preoccupying questions: how should a poet properly live and write? What is his relationship to be to his own voice, his own place, his literary heritage and his contemporary world?

— Seamus Heaney, Preoccupations, Foreword

== Reception ==
The book was well received upon its release. Writing in her review for The Observer, Lachlan MacKinnon described Heaney's writing as "precise" and "engaging". Robert Henryson in Kirkus Reviews stated the book was a "must[-read] for poets and students of poetry". Rachel Buxton for The Cambridge Quarterly said in her review the book is "to be cherished" as a means to reassess Heaney's past poetic criticism. Writing for the Harvard Review, Thomas O'Grady described the book as a "compelling complement" to Heaney's poetic work.

William Pratt, writing for World Literature Today, found the book ambitious but inconsistent in its poetic criticism and "mean-spirited" in its tone.
