= Julie O'Callaghan =

Poet

- Born: Chicago, Illinois
- Occupation: Poet
- Writing career
- Notable awards: Michael Hartnett Award for poetry

Julie O'Callaghan (born 1954) is an American poet based in Ireland. She has written poetry for both children and adults.

== Life ==
Born in Chicago, Julie O'Callaghan came to Ireland in July 1974 after two years of college in the United States. to study for a third year at Trinity College Dublin. Abandoning her degree, she moved to Ireland permanently, taking a job in the Library of Trinity College. In 1985 she married the Irish poet Dennis O'Driscoll, who she met at a poetry reading by Seamus Heaney at the Lantern Theatre in Dublin. O'Driscoll died in 2012.

The Arts Council of Ireland awarded her bursaries in 1985, 1990, and 1998. She has been published in the Times Literary Supplement, The Observer, The Guardian, The Irish Times, Poetry Ireland Review and New Statesman. Several of her poetry collections have been recommended by The Poetry Book Society.

In 2021 her poem The Net was covered by the Irish Independent. Her book Magnum Mysterium (2020) was reviewed by Tristram Fane Saunders, in The Telegraph.

O'Callaghan received the Michael Hartnett Poetry Award in 2001, which stated she writes poems which 'seem effortless and are immediately accessible and achieve great emotional weight by the lightest of means'.

She is a member of the Aosdána.

== Works ==
- Edible anecdotes and other poems. Mountrath, Portlaoise, Ireland: Dolmen Press, 1983.
- Well-heeled, London: Gefn Press, 1985. With lithographs by Susan Johanknecht.
- (with Alan Bold and Gareth Owen) Bright lights blaze out. Oxford: Oxford University Press, 1986.
- Taking my pen for a walk. London: Orchard, 1988.
- Jasper the Lion Heart. London: Gefn Press, 1990. With lithographs by Susan Johanknecht.
- What's what. Newcastle upon Tyne: Bloodaxe Books, 1991.
- Two barks: poems. Newcastle upon Tyne: Bloodaxe Books, 1998.
- No can do. Newcastle upon Tyne: Bloodaxe Books, 2000.
- Problem. Boston, MA: Pressed Wafer, 2005.
- The book of whispers. London: Faber, 2006.
- Tell me this is normal': new & selected poems. Tarset, Northumberland: Bloodaze Books, 2008.
- Magnum Mysterium. Bloodaxe Books, 2020.
