= Michael Van Walleghen =

American poet (born 1938)

Michael Van Walleghen (1938 — May 20, 2022) was an American poet. He has published six books of poetry; his second, More Trouble With the Obvious (1981), was the winner of the Lamont Poetry Prize of the Academy of American Poets. He has also received two National Endowment for the Arts fellowships, first prize in the Borestone Mountain Poetry Awards, a Pushcart Prize, and several grants from the Illinois Arts Council. Before retirement he was a professor of English at the University of Illinois at Urbana-Champaign and was the first director of the MFA in Creative Writing program created there in 2003.

Van Walleghen began his academic career at Wichita State University.

He died on May 20, 2022, in Champaign, Illinois, at age 83.

== Published works ==
- "The Permanence of Witches" published in The Best Poems of 1966 (Pacific Press).
- The Wichita Poems (1975)
- More Trouble With the Obvious (1981)
- Blue Tango: Poems (Urbana: University of Illinois Press, 1989. ISBN 0-252-06044-X)
- Tall Birds Stalking (1994)
- The Last Neanderthal (1999)
- Translations of Russian poet Dmitri Bobyshev in the anthology In the Grip of Strange Thoughts: Russian Poetry in a New Era (Zephyr Press, 1999)
- In the Black Window (Urbana: University of Illinois Press, 2002. ISBN 0-252-02921-6)
