= Seamus Heaney =

Irish poet (1939–2013)

Seamus Heaney MRIA
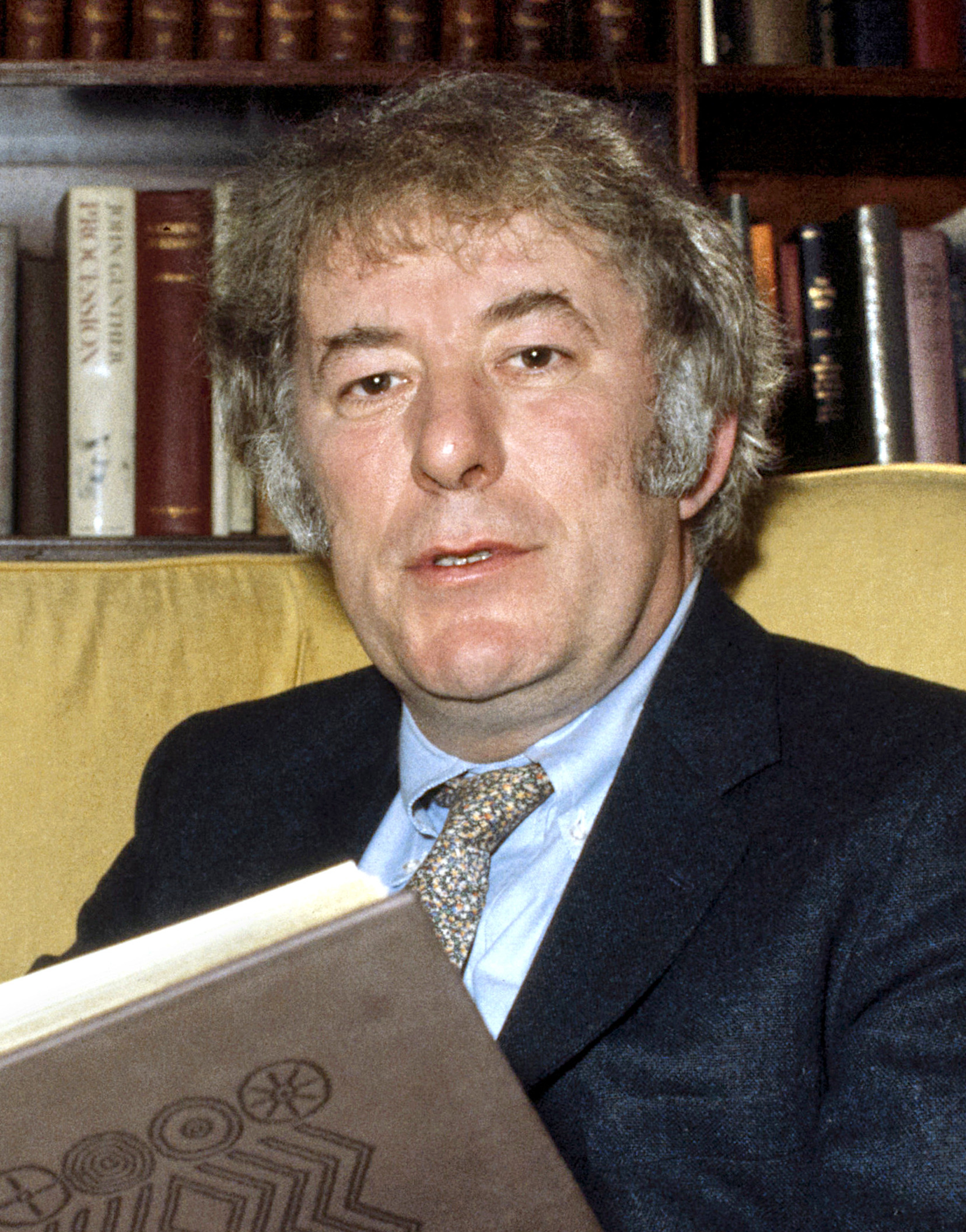
- Heaney in 1982
- Born: 13 April 1939; Tamniaran, near Castledawson, County Londonderry, Northern Ireland
- Died: 30 August 2013 (aged 74); Blackrock, Dublin, Ireland
- Resting place: St. Mary's Church, Bellaghy, Northern Ireland
- Education: Queen's University Belfast
- Occupations: Poet; playwright; translator
- Spouse: Marie Devlin (m. 1965)
- Children: 3
- Writing career
- Period: 1966–2013
- Notable works: List of notable works: Death of a Naturalist (1966); North (1975); Field Work (1979); The Spirit Level (1996); Beowulf: A New Verse Translation (translation, 1999); District and Circle (2006); Human Chain (2010)

Signature
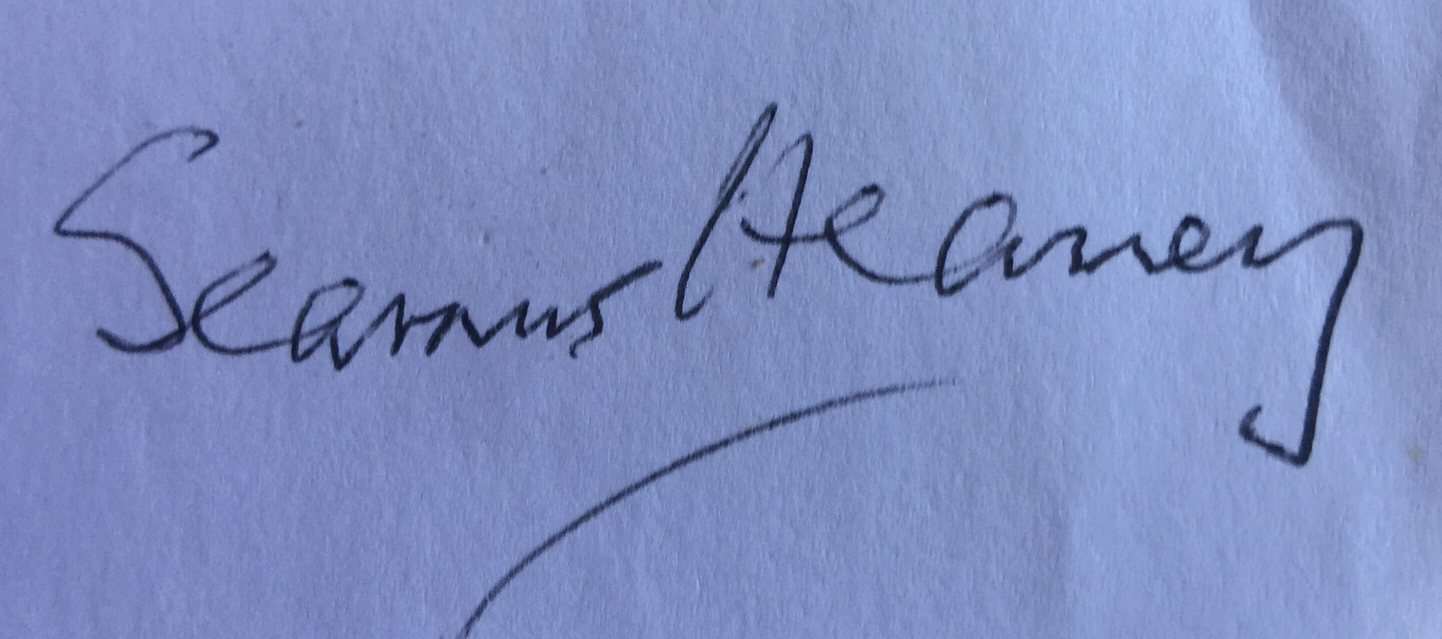

Seamus Justin Heaney (13 April 1939 – 30 August 2013) was an Irish poet, playwright and translator. He received the 1995 Nobel Prize in Literature. Among his best-known works is Death of a Naturalist (1966), his first major published volume. American poet Robert Lowell described him as "the most important Irish poet since Yeats", and many others, including the academic John Sutherland, have said that he was "the greatest poet of our age". Robert Pinsky has stated that "with his wonderful gift of eye and ear Heaney has the gift of the story-teller." Upon his death in 2013, The Independent described him as "probably the best-known poet in the world".

Heaney was born in the townland of Tamniaran, near Castledawson, Northern Ireland. His family moved to nearby Bellaghy when he was a boy. He became a lecturer at St. Joseph's College in Belfast in the early 1960s, after attending Queen's University, and began to have his poetry published. He lived in Sandymount, Dublin, from 1976 until his death. He was a part-time resident of the United States from 1981 to 2006, while he was a professor at Harvard from 1981 to 1997 and their Poet in Residence from 1988 to 2006. From 1989 to 1994, he was also the Professor of Poetry at Oxford. In 1996 he was made a Commandeur of the Ordre des Arts et des Lettres and in 1998 was bestowed the title Saoi of Aosdána. He won the Whitbread Book of the Year Award for The Spirit Level (1996) and Beowulf: A New Verse Translation (1999). With Ted Hughes, he edited the anthologies The Rattle Bag (1982) and The School Bag (1997), intended to introduce poetry to young readers.

Heaney is buried at St. Mary's Church, Bellaghy, Northern Ireland. The headstone bears the epitaph "Walk on air against your better judgement", from his poem "The Gravel Walks".

== Early life ==
Wearing a poppy bruise on the left temple,
He lay in the four-foot box as in his cot.
No gaudy scars, the bumper knocked him clear.

A four-foot box, a foot for every year.

— from "Mid-Term break",
Death of a Naturalist (1966)

Heaney was born on 13 April 1939 at the family farmhouse called Mossbawn, near Castledawson in County Londonderry; he was the first of nine children. In 1953, his family moved to Bellaghy, a few miles away, which is now the family home. His father was Patrick Heaney (d. October 1986), a farmer and cattle dealer, and the eighth child of ten born to James and Sarah Heaney. Patrick was introduced to cattle dealing by his uncles, who raised him after his parents' early deaths. Heaney's mother was Margaret Kathleen McCann (1911–1984), whose relatives worked at a local linen mill. Heaney remarked on the inner tension between the rural Gaelic past exemplified by his father and the industrialized Ulster exemplified by his mother.

Heaney attended Anahorish Primary School, and won a scholarship to St Columb's College, a Roman Catholic boarding school in Derry when he was twelve years old. While studying at St Columb's, Heaney's four-year-old brother Christopher was killed in February 1953 in a road accident. The poems "Mid-Term Break" and "The Blackbird of Glanmore" are related to his brother's death.

Heaney played Gaelic football for Castledawson GAC, the club in the area of his birth, as a boy, and did not change to Bellaghy when his family moved there. However, he has remarked that he became involved culturally with Bellaghy GAA Club in his late teens, acting in amateur plays and composing treasure hunts for the club.

== Career ==
=== 1957–1969 ===
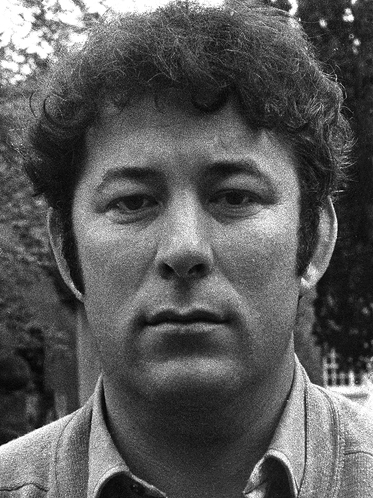
Seamus Heaney in 1970

My grandfather cut more turf in a day
Than any other man on Toner's bog.
Once I carried him milk in a bottle
Corked sloppily with paper. He straightened up
To drink it, then fell to right away

Nicking and slicing neatly, heaving sods
Over his shoulder, going down and down
For the good turf. Digging.

The cold smell of potato mould, the squelch and slap
Of soggy peat, the curt cuts of an edge
Through living roots awaken in my head.
But I've no spade to follow men like them.

Between my finger and my thumb
The squat pen rests.
I'll dig with it.

— from "Digging", Death of a Naturalist (1966)

Heaney studied English Language and Literature at Queen's University Belfast starting in 1957. While there, he found a copy of Ted Hughes's Lupercal, which spurred him to write poetry. "Suddenly, the matter of contemporary poetry was the material of my own life," he said. He graduated in 1961 with a First Class Honours degree.

Heaney studied for a teacher certification at St Joseph's Teacher Training College in Belfast (now merged with St Mary's, University College), and began teaching at St Thomas' Secondary Intermediate School in Ballymurphy, Belfast. The headmaster of this school was the writer Michael McLaverty from County Monaghan, who introduced Heaney to the poetry of Patrick Kavanagh. With McLaverty's mentorship, Heaney first started to publish poetry in 1962. Sophia Hillan describes how McLaverty was like a foster father to the younger Belfast poet. In the introduction to McLaverty's Collected Works, Heaney summarised the poet's contribution and influence: "His voice was modestly pitched, he never sought the limelight, yet for all that, his place in our literature is secure." Heaney's poem "Fosterage", in the sequence "Singing School", from North (1975), is dedicated to him.

In 1963 Heaney began lecturing at St Joseph's, and joined the Belfast Group, a poets' workshop organized by Philip Hobsbaum, then an English lecturer at Queen's University. Through this, Heaney met other Belfast poets, including Derek Mahon and Michael Longley.

Heaney met Marie Devlin, a native of Ardboe, County Tyrone, while at St Joseph's in 1962; they married in August 1965 and would go on to have three children. A school teacher and writer, Devlin published Over Nine Waves (1994), a collection of traditional Irish myths and legends. Heaney's first book, Eleven Poems, was published in November 1965 for the Queen's University Festival. In 1966 their first son, Michael, was born. Heaney earned a living at the time by writing for The Irish Times, often on the subject of radio. A second son, Christopher, was born in 1968.

Heaney initially sought publication with Dolmen Press in Dublin for his first volume of work. While waiting to hear back, he was signed with Faber and Faber and published Death of a Naturalist in 1966, and Faber remained his publisher for the rest of his life. This collection was met with much critical acclaim and won several awards, including the Gregory Award for Young Writers and the Geoffrey Faber Prize. The same year, he was appointed as a lecturer in Modern English Literature at Queen's University Belfast. In 1968, Heaney and Michael Longley undertook a reading tour called Room to Rhyme, which increased awareness of the poet's work. The following year, Heaney published his second major volume, Door into the Dark.

=== 1970–1984 ===
Heaney taught as a visiting professor in English at the University of California, Berkeley in the 1970–1971 academic year. In 1972, he left his lectureship in Belfast, moved to Wicklow in the Republic of Ireland, and began writing on a full-time basis. That year, he published his third collection, Wintering Out. His daughter Catherine Ann was born in 1973. In 1975, Heaney's next volume, North, was published. A pamphlet of prose poems entitled Stations was published the same year.

In 1976, Heaney was appointed Head of English at Carysfort College in Dublin and moved with his family to the suburb of Sandymount. His next collection, Field Work, was published in 1979. Selected Poems 1965-1975 and Preoccupations: Selected Prose 1968–1978 were published in 1980. When Aosdána, the national Irish Arts Council, was established in 1981, Heaney was among those elected into its first group. (He was subsequently elected a Saoi, one of its five elders and its highest honour, in 1997).

Also in 1981, Heaney travelled to the United States as a visiting professor at Harvard, where he was affiliated with Adams House. He was awarded two honorary doctorates, from Queen's University and from Fordham University in New York City (1982). At the Fordham commencement ceremony on 23 May 1982, Heaney delivered his address as a 46-stanza poem entitled "Verses for a Fordham Commencement".

Born and educated in Northern Ireland, Heaney stressed that he was Irish and not British. Following the success of the Field Day Theatre Company's production of Brian Friel's Translations, the founders Brian Friel and Stephen Rea decided to make the company a permanent group. Heaney joined the company's expanded Board of Directors in 1981. In autumn 1984, his mother, Margaret, died. Three years later he would publish eight sonnets, under the title Clearances, as a tribute to his mother.

=== 1985–1999 ===
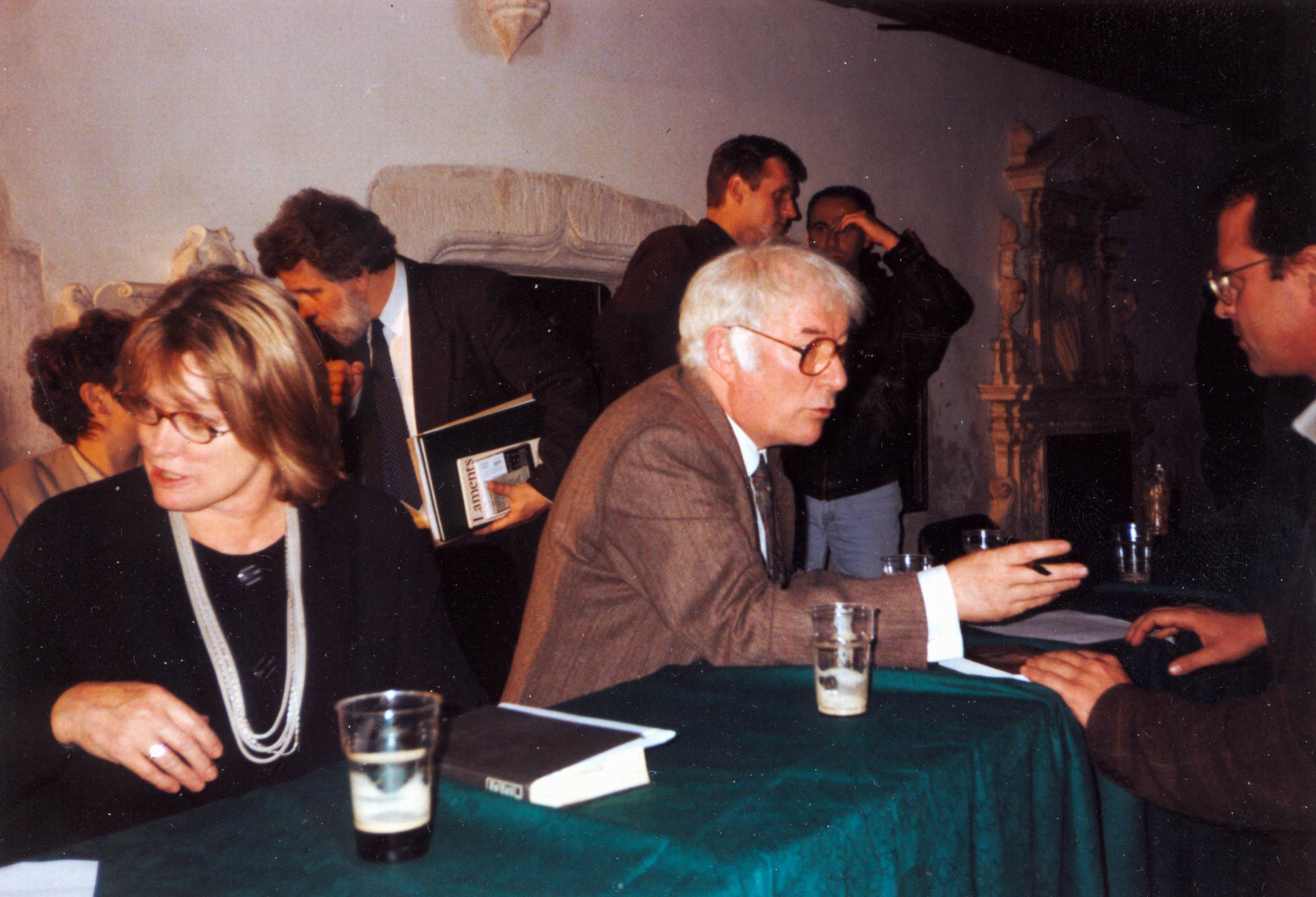
Marie and Seamus Heaney at the Dominican Church, Kraków, Poland, 4 October 1996

Heaney became a tenured faculty member at Harvard, as the Boylston Professor of Rhetoric and Oratory (formerly visiting professor) 1985–1997, and the Ralph Waldo Emerson Poet in Residence at Harvard 1998–2006. In 1986, Heaney received a Litt.D. from Bates College. His father, Patrick, died in October the same year. The loss of both parents within two years affected Heaney deeply, and he expressed his grief in poems. In 1988, a collection of his critical essays, The Government of the Tongue, was published.

In 1985 Heaney wrote the poem "From the Republic of Conscience" at the request of Amnesty International Ireland. He wanted to "celebrate United Nations Day and the work of Amnesty". The poem inspired the title of Amnesty International's highest honour, the Ambassador of Conscience Award.

In 1988 Heaney donated his lecture notes to the Rare Book Library of Emory University in Atlanta, Georgia, after giving the notable Ellmann Lectures there.

In 1989, Heaney was elected Oxford Professor of Poetry, which he held for a five-year term to 1994. The chair does not require residence in Oxford. Throughout this period, he divided his time between Ireland and the United States. He also continued to give public readings. These events were so well attended and keenly anticipated that those who queued for tickets with such enthusiasm were sometimes dubbed "Heaneyboppers", suggesting an almost teenybopper fan base.

In 1990 The Cure at Troy, a play based on Sophocles's Philoctetes, was published. The next year, he published another volume of poetry, Seeing Things (1991). Heaney was named an Honorary Patron of the University Philosophical Society, Trinity College Dublin, and was elected an Honorary Fellow of the Royal Society of Literature (1991).

In 1993 Heaney guest-edited The Mays Anthology, a collection of new writing from students at the University of Oxford and University of Cambridge. That same year, he was awarded the Dickinson College Arts Award and returned to the Pennsylvania college to deliver the commencement address and receive an honorary degree. He was scheduled to return to Dickinson again to receive the Harold and Ethel L. Stellfox Award—for a major literary figure—at the time of his death in 2013. Irish poet Paul Muldoon was named recipient of the award that year, partly in recognition of the close connection between the two poets.

Heaney was awarded the Nobel Prize in Literature in 1995 for "works of lyrical beauty and ethical depth, which exalt everyday miracles and the living past". He was on holiday in Greece with his wife when the news broke. Neither journalists nor his own children could reach him until he arrived at Dublin Airport two days later, although an Irish television camera traced him to Kalamata. Asked how he felt to have his name added to the Irish Nobel pantheon of W. B. Yeats, George Bernard Shaw and Samuel Beckett, Heaney responded: "It's like being a little foothill at the bottom of a mountain range. You hope you just live up to it. It's extraordinary." He and his wife Marie were immediately taken from the airport to Áras an Uachtaráin for champagne with President Mary Robinson. He would refer to the prize discreetly as "the N thing" in personal exchanges with others.

Heaney's 1996 collection The Spirit Level won the Whitbread Book of the Year Award; he repeated the success in 1999 with Beowulf: A New Verse Translation.

Heaney was elected a Member of the Royal Irish Academy in 1996 and was admitted in 1997. In the same year, Heaney was elected Saoi of Aosdána. In 1998, Heaney was elected Honorary Fellow of Trinity College Dublin.

=== 2000s ===
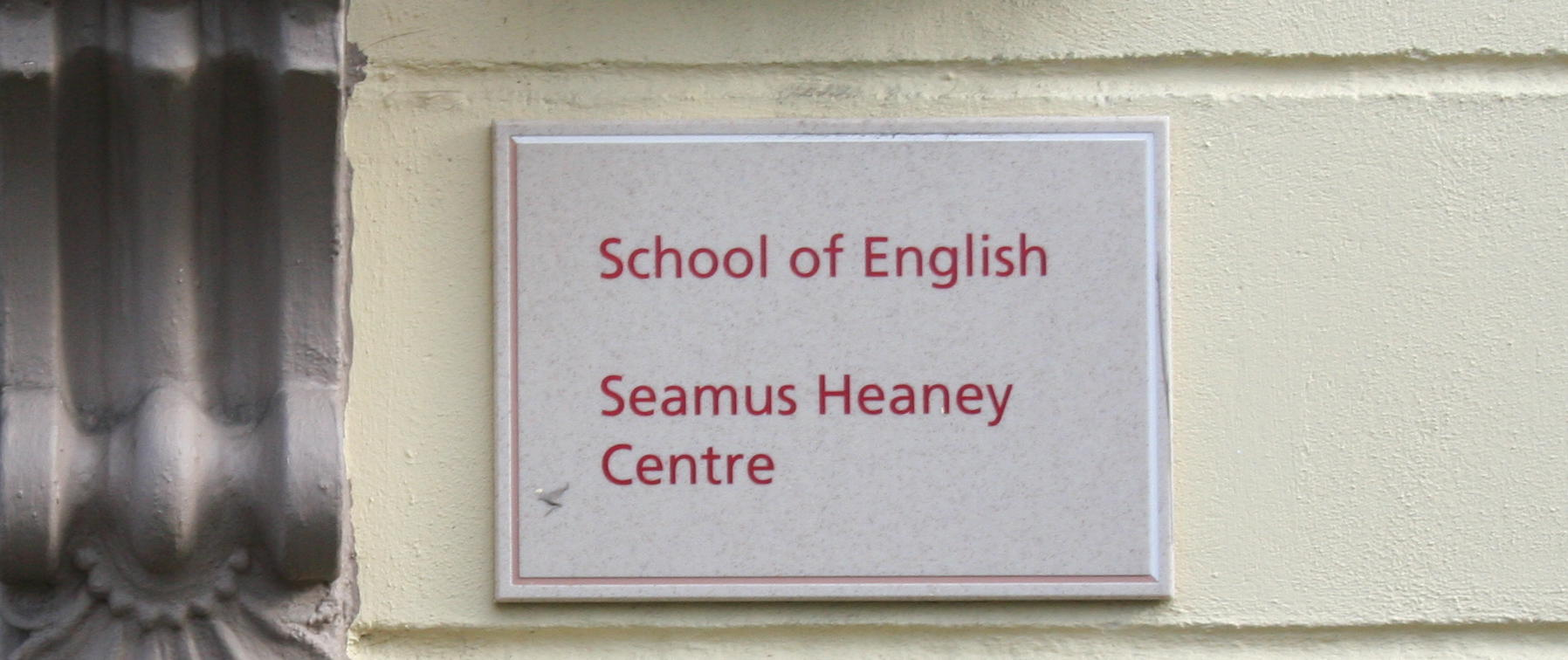
The Seamus Heaney Centre for Poetry, which was officially opened at Queen's University Belfast in 2004

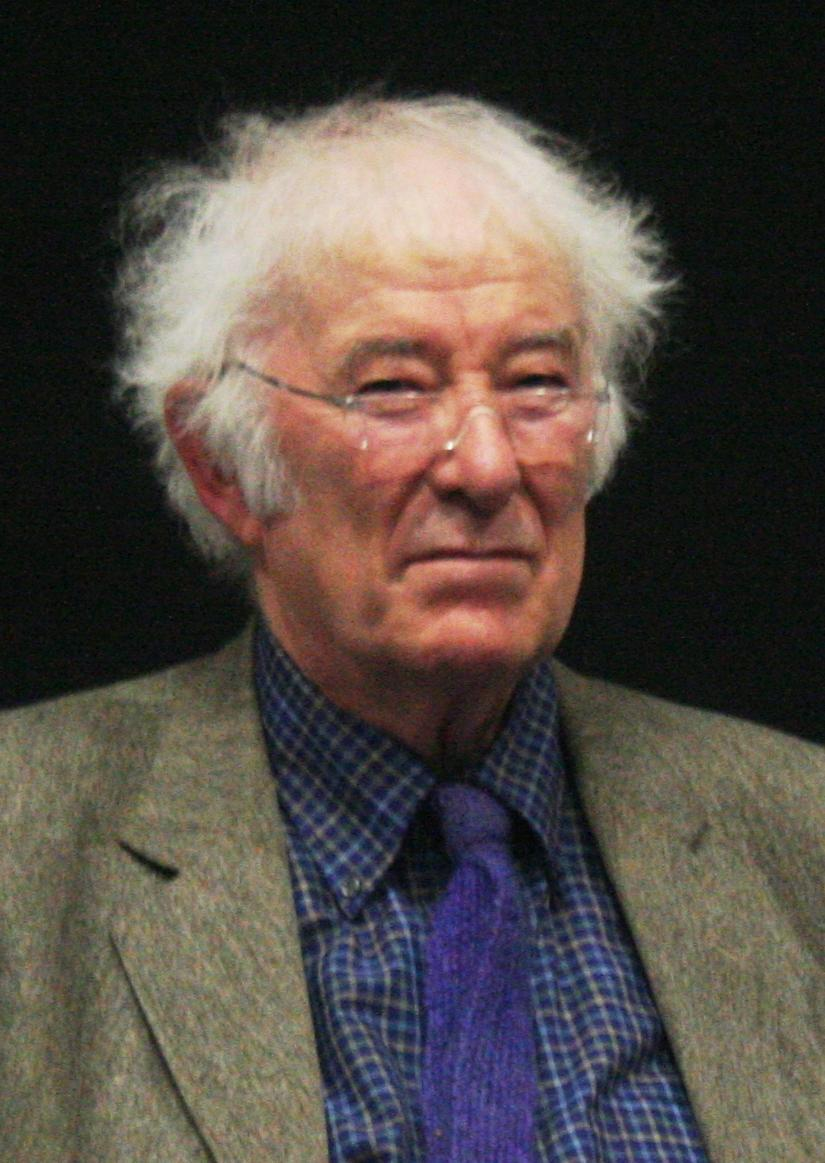
Seamus Heaney in 2009

In 2000, Heaney was awarded an honorary doctorate and delivered the commencement address at the University of Pennsylvania. In 2002, Heaney was awarded an honorary doctorate from Rhodes University and delivered a public lecture on "The Guttural Muse".

In 2003 the Seamus Heaney Centre for Poetry was opened at Queen's University Belfast. It houses the Heaney Media Archive, a record of Heaney's entire oeuvre, along with a full catalogue of his radio and television presentations. That same year, Heaney decided to lodge a substantial portion of his literary archive at Emory University as a memorial to the work of William M. Chace, the university's recently retired president. The Emory papers represented the largest repository of Heaney's work (1964–2003). He donated these to help build their large existing archive of material from Irish writers including Yeats, Paul Muldoon, Ciaran Carson, Michael Longley and other members of the Belfast Group.

In 2003, when asked if there was any figure in popular culture who aroused interest in poetry and lyrics, Heaney praised American rap artist Eminem from Detroit, saying, "He has created a sense of what is possible. He has sent a voltage around a generation. He has done this not just through his subversive attitude but also his verbal energy." Heaney wrote the poem "Beacons at Bealtaine" to mark the 2004 EU Enlargement. He read the poem at a ceremony for the 25 leaders of the enlarged European Union, arranged by the Irish EU presidency.

In August 2006 Heaney had a stroke. Although he recovered and joked, "Blessed are the pacemakers" when fitted with a heart monitor, he cancelled all public engagements for several months. He was in County Donegal at the time of the 75th birthday of Anne Friel, wife of playwright Brian Friel. He read the works of Henning Mankell, Donna Leon and Robert Harris while in hospital. Among his visitors was former President Bill Clinton.

Heaney's District and Circle won the 2006 T. S. Eliot Prize. In 2008, he became artist of honour in Østermarie, Denmark, and Seamus Heaney Stræde (street) was named after him. In 2009, Heaney was presented with an Honorary-Life Membership award from the University College Dublin (UCD) Law Society, in recognition of his remarkable role as a literary figure.

Faber and Faber published Dennis O'Driscoll's book Stepping Stones: Interviews with Seamus Heaney in 2008; this has been described as the nearest thing to an autobiography of Heaney. In 2009, Heaney was awarded the David Cohen Prize for Literature. He recorded a spoken word album, over 12 hours long, of himself reading his poetry collections to commemorate his 70th birthday, which occurred on 13 April 2009.

=== 2010s ===
He spoke at the West Belfast Festival in July 2010 in celebration of his mentor, the poet and novelist Michael McLaverty, who had helped Heaney to first publish his poetry.

In September 2010 Faber published Human Chain, Heaney's twelfth collection. Human Chain was awarded the Forward Poetry Prize for Best Collection, one of the major poetry prizes Heaney had never previously won, despite having been twice shortlisted. The book, published 44 years after the poet's first, was inspired in part by Heaney's stroke in 2006, which left him "babyish" and "on the brink". Poet and Forward judge Ruth Padel described the work as "a collection of painful, honest and delicately weighted poems ... a wonderful and humane achievement." Writer Colm Tóibín described Human Chain as "his best single volume for many years, and one that contains some of the best poems he has written... is a book of shades and memories, of things whispered, of journeys into the underworld, of elegies and translations, of echoes and silences." In October 2010, the collection was shortlisted for the T. S. Eliot Prize.

Heaney was named one of "Britain's top 300 intellectuals" by The Observer in 2011, though the newspaper later published a correction acknowledging that "several individuals who would not claim to be British" had been featured, of which Heaney was one. That same year, he contributed translations of Old Irish marginalia for Songs of the Scribe, an album by Traditional Singer in Residence of the Seamus Heaney Centre for Poetry, Pádraigín Ní Uallacháin.

In December 2011, Heaney donated his personal literary notes to the National Library of Ireland. Even though he admitted he would likely have earned a fortune by auctioning them, Heaney personally packed up the boxes of notes and drafts and, accompanied by his son Michael, delivered them to the National Library.

In June 2012, Heaney accepted the Griffin Trust for Excellence in Poetry's Lifetime Recognition Award and gave a speech in honour of the award.

Heaney was compiling a collection of his work in anticipation of Selected Poems 1988–2013 at the time of his death. The selection includes poems and writings from Seeing Things, The Spirit Level, the translation of Beowulf, Electric Light, District and Circle, and Human Chain (fall 2014).

In February 2014, Emory University premiered Seamus Heaney: The Music of What Happens, the first major exhibition to celebrate the life and work of Seamus Heaney since his death. The exhibit holds a display of the surface of Heaney's personal writing desk that he used in the 1980s as well as old photographs and personal correspondence with other writers. Heaney died in August 2013 during the curatorial process of the exhibition. Though the exhibit's original vision to celebrate Heaney's life and work remains at the forefront, there is a small section commemorating his death and its influence.

In September 2015, it was announced that Heaney's family would posthumously publish his translation of Book VI of The Aeneid in 2016.

== Death ==
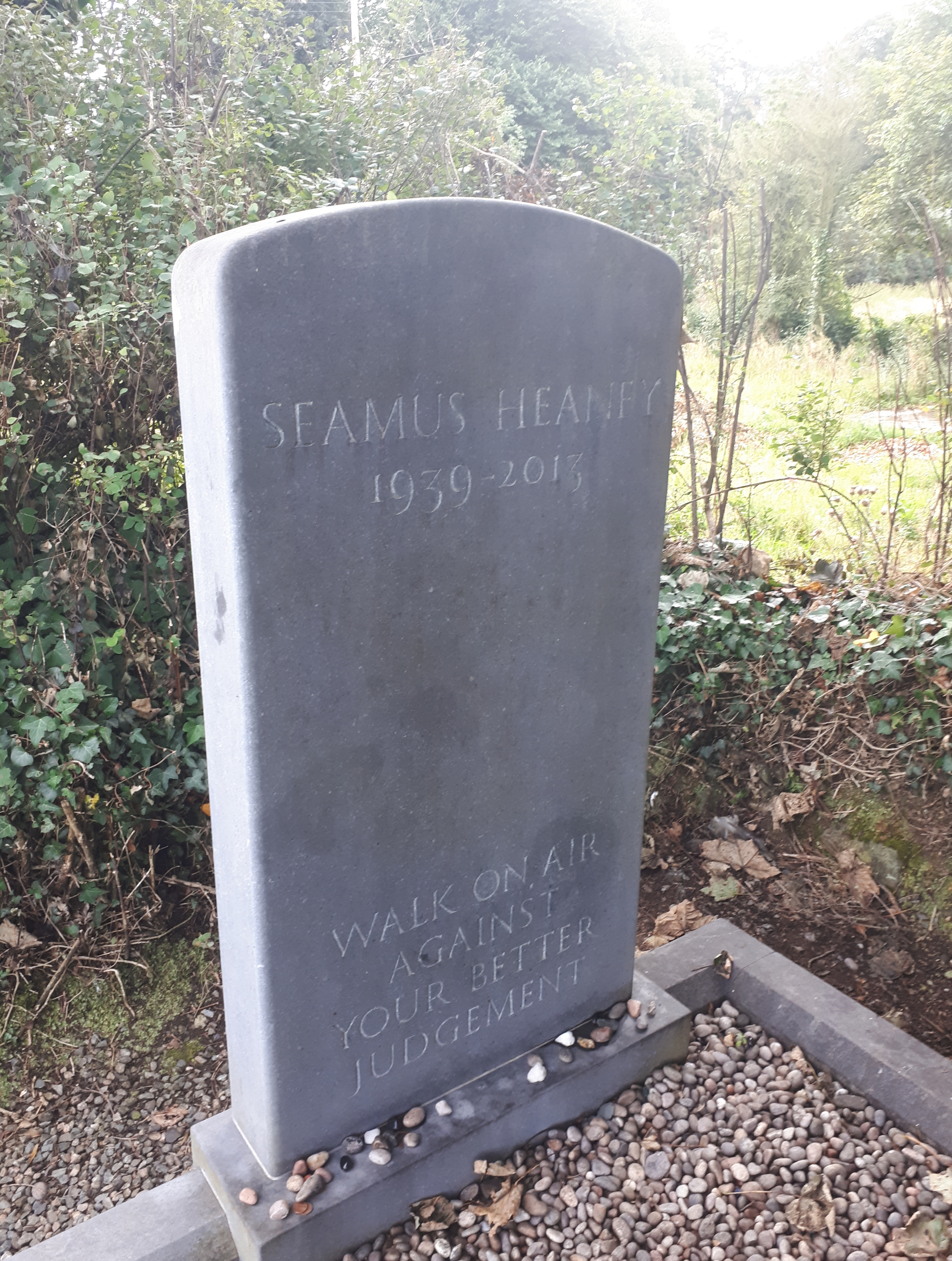
Heaney's grave at St. Mary's Church, Bellaghy

Seamus Heaney died in the Blackrock Clinic in Dublin on 30 August 2013, aged 74, following a short illness. After a fall outside a restaurant in Dublin, he entered a hospital for a medical procedure but died at 7:30 the following morning before it took place. His funeral was held in Donnybrook, Dublin, on the morning of 2 September 2013, and he was buried in the evening at St. Mary's Church, Bellaghy his home village, in the same graveyard as his parents, younger brother, and other family members. His son Michael revealed at the funeral mass that his father texted his final words, "Noli timere" (Latin: "Be not afraid"), to his wife, Marie, minutes before he died.

His funeral was broadcast live the following day on RTÉ television and radio and was streamed internationally at RTÉ's website. RTÉ Radio 1 Extra transmitted a continuous broadcast, from 8 a.m. to 9:15 p.m. on the day of the funeral, of his Collected Poems album, recorded by Heaney in 2009. His poetry collections sold out rapidly in Irish bookshops immediately following his death.

Many tributes were paid to Heaney. President Michael D. Higgins said:

...we in Ireland will once again get a sense of the depth and range of the contribution of Seamus Heaney to our contemporary world, but what those of us who have had the privilege of his friendship and presence will miss is the extraordinary depth and warmth of his personality...Generations of Irish people will have been familiar with Seamus' poems. Scholars all over the world will have gained from the depth of the critical essays, and so many rights organisations will want to thank him for all the solidarity he gave to the struggles within the republic of conscience.

President Higgins also appeared live from Áras an Uachtaráin on the Nine O'Clock News in a five-minute segment in which he paid tribute to Seamus Heaney.

Bill Clinton, former President of the United States, said:

Both his stunning work and his life were a gift to the world. His mind, heart, and his uniquely Irish gift for language made him our finest poet of the rhythms of ordinary lives and a powerful voice for peace...His wonderful work, like that of his fellow Irish Nobel Prize winners Shaw, Yeats, and Beckett, will be a lasting gift for all the world.

José Manuel Barroso, European Commission president, said:

I am greatly saddened today to learn of the death of Seamus Heaney, one of the great European poets of our lifetime. ... The strength, beauty and character of his words will endure for generations to come and were rightly recognised with the Nobel Prize for Literature.

Harvard University issued a statement:

We are fortunate and proud to have counted Seamus Heaney as a revered member of the Harvard family. For us, as for people around the world, he epitomised the poet as a wellspring of humane insight and artful imagination, subtle wisdom and shining grace. We will remember him with deep affection and admiration.

Poet Michael Longley, a close friend of Heaney, said: "I feel like I've lost a brother." Thomas Kinsella said he was shocked, but John Montague said he had known for some time that the poet was not well. Playwright Frank McGuinness called Heaney "the greatest Irishman of my generation: he had no rivals." Colm Tóibín wrote: "In a time of burnings and bombings Heaney used poetry to offer an alternative world." Gerald Dawe said he was "like an older brother who encouraged you to do the best you could do". Theo Dorgan said: "[Heaney's] work will pass into permanence. Everywhere I go there is real shock at this. Seamus was one of us." His publisher, Faber and Faber, noted that "his impact on literary culture is immeasurable." Playwright Tom Stoppard said, "Seamus never had a sour moment, neither in person nor on paper." Andrew Motion, a former UK Poet Laureate and friend of Heaney, called him "a great poet, a wonderful writer about poetry, and a person of truly exceptional grace and intelligence."

Many memorial events were held, including a commemoration at Emory University, Harvard University, Oxford University and the Southbank Centre, London. Leading US poetry organisations also met in New York to commemorate the death.

== Work ==
In order that human beings bring about the most radiant conditions for themselves to inhabit, it is essential that the vision of reality which poetry offers should be transformative, more than just a printout of the given circumstances of its time and place. The poet who would be most the poet has to attempt an act of writing that outstrips the conditions even as it observes them.

— from "Joy Or Night: Last Things in the Poetry of W. B. Yeats and Philip Larkin", W. D. Thomas Memorial Lecture delivered by Seamus Heaney at University College of Swansea on 18 January 1993.

=== Naturalism ===
At one time Heaney's books made up two-thirds of the sales of living poets in the UK. His work often deals with the local surroundings of Ireland, particularly in Northern Ireland, where he was born and lived until young adulthood. Speaking of his early life and education, he commented, "I learned that my local County Derry experience, which I had considered archaic and irrelevant to 'the modern world', was to be trusted. They taught me that trust and helped me to articulate it." Death of a Naturalist (1966) and Door into the Dark (1969) mostly focus on the details of rural, parochial life.

In a number of volumes, beginning with Door into the Dark (1969) and Wintering Out (1972), Heaney also spent a significant amount of time writing on the northern Irish bog. Particularly of note is the collection of bog body poems in North (1975), featuring mangled bodies preserved in the bog. In a review by Ciaran Carson, he said that the bog poems made Heaney into "the laureate of violence—a mythmaker, an anthropologist of ritual killing...the world of megalithic doorways and charming noble barbarity." Poems such as "Bogland" and "Bog Queen" addressed political struggles directly for the first time.

=== Politics ===
Allusions to sectarian differences, widespread in Northern Ireland throughout his lifetime, can be found in his poems. His books Wintering Out (1973) and North (1975) seek to interweave commentary on the Troubles with a historical context and wider human experience. While some critics accused Heaney of being "an apologist and a mythologiser" of the violence, Blake Morrison suggests the poet

has written poems directly about the Troubles as well as elegies for friends and acquaintances who have died in them; he has tried to discover a historical framework in which to interpret the current unrest; and he has taken on the mantle of public spokesman, someone looked to for comment and guidance... Yet he has also shown signs of deeply resenting this role, defending the right of poets to be private and apolitical, and questioning the extent to which poetry, however "committed", can influence the course of history.

Shaun O'Connell in the New Boston Review notes that "those who see Seamus Heaney as a symbol of hope in a troubled land are not, of course, wrong to do so, though they may be missing much of the undercutting complexities of his poetry, the backwash of ironies which make him as bleak as he is bright." O'Connell notes in his Boston Review critique of Station Island:

Again and again Heaney pulls back from political purposes; despite its emblems of savagery, Station Island lends no rhetorical comfort to Republicanism. Politic about politics, Station Island is less about a united Ireland than about a poet seeking religious and aesthetic unity.

Heaney is described by critic Terry Eagleton as "an enlightened cosmopolitan liberal", refusing to be drawn. Eagleton suggests: "When the political is introduced... it is only in the context of what Heaney will or will not say." Reflections on what Heaney identifies as "tribal conflict" favour the description of people's lives and their voices, drawing out the "psychic landscape". His collections often recall the assassinations of his family members and close friends, lynchings and bombings. Colm Tóibín wrote, "throughout his career there have been poems of simple evocation and description. His refusal to sum up or offer meaning is part of his tact."

Heaney published "Requiem for the Croppies", a poem that commemorates the Irish rebels of 1798, on the 50th anniversary of the 1916 Easter Rising. He read the poem to both Catholic and Protestant audiences in Ireland. He commented: "To read 'Requiem for the Croppies' wasn't to say 'up the IRA' or anything. It was silence-breaking rather than rabble-rousing." He stated, "You don't have to love it. You just have to permit it."

He turned down the offer of laureateship of the United Kingdom, partly for political reasons, commenting, "I've nothing against the Queen personally: I had lunch at the Palace once upon a time." He stated that his "cultural starting point" was "off-centre". A much-quoted statement was when he objected to being included in The Penguin Book of Contemporary British Poetry (1982). Although he was born in Northern Ireland, his response to being included in the British anthology was delivered in his poem "An Open Letter":

Don't be surprised if I demur, for, be advised
My passport's green.
No glass of ours was ever raised
To toast The Queen.

=== Translation ===
He was concerned, as a poet and a translator, with the English language as it is spoken in Ireland but also as spoken elsewhere and in other times; he explored Anglo-Saxon influences in his work and study. Critic W. S. Di Piero noted

Whatever the occasion, childhood, farm life, politics and culture in Northern Ireland, other poets past and present, Heaney strikes time and again at the taproot of language, examining its genetic structures, trying to discover how it has served, in all its changes, as a culture bearer, a world to contain imaginations, at once a rhetorical weapon and nutriment of spirit. He writes of these matters with rare discrimination and resourcefulness, and a winning impatience with received wisdom.

Heaney's first translation was of the Irish lyric poem Buile Suibhne, published as Sweeney Astray: A Version from the Irish (1984). He took up this character and connection in poems published in Station Island (1984). Heaney's prize-winning translation of Beowulf (Farrar, Straus & Giroux, 2000, Whitbread Book of the Year Award) was considered groundbreaking in its use of modern language melded with the original Anglo-Saxon "music".

=== Plays and prose ===
His plays include The Cure at Troy: A Version of Sophocles' Philoctetes (1991). Heaney's 2004 play, The Burial at Thebes, suggests parallels between Creon and the foreign policies of the Bush administration.

Heaney's engagement with poetry as a necessary engine for cultural and personal change is reflected in his prose works The Redress of Poetry (1995) and Finders Keepers: Selected Prose: 1971–2001 (2001).

"When a poem rhymes," Heaney wrote, "when a form generates itself, when a metre provokes consciousness into new postures, it is already on the side of life. When a rhyme surprises and extends the fixed relations between words, that in itself protests against necessity. When language does more than enough, as it does in all achieved poetry, it opts for the condition of overlife, and rebels at limit."

He continues: "The vision of reality which poetry offers should be transformative, more than just a printout of the given circumstances of its time and place". Often overlooked and underestimated in the direction of his work is his profound poetic debts to and critical engagement with 20th-century Eastern European poets, and in particular Nobel laureate Czesław Miłosz.

=== Use in the school syllabus ===
Heaney's work is used extensively in the school syllabus internationally, including the anthologies The Rattle Bag (1982) and The School Bag (1997) (both edited with Ted Hughes). Originally entitled The Faber Book of Verse for Younger People on the Faber contract, Hughes and Heaney decided the main purpose of The Rattle Bag was to offer enjoyment to the reader: "Arbitrary riches." Heaney commented "the book in our heads was something closer to The Fancy Free Poetry Supplement". It included work that they would have liked to encounter sooner in their own lives, as well as nonsense rhymes, ballad-type poems, riddles, folk songs and rhythmical jingles. Much familiar canonical work was not included, since they took it for granted that their audience would know the standard fare. Fifteen years later, The School Bag aimed at something different. The foreword stated that they wanted "less of a carnival, more like a checklist." It included poems in English, Irish, Welsh, Scots and Scots Gaelic, together with work reflecting the African-American experience.

== Legacy ==
The Seamus Heaney HomePlace, in Bellaghy, is a literary and arts centre which commemorates Heaney's legacy. His literary papers are held by the National Library of Ireland.

Following an approach by Fintan O'Toole, the Heaney family authorised a biography of the poet, with access to family-held records (2017). O'Toole had been somewhat acquainted with Heaney. And according to his son, Heaney had admired O'Toole's work.

In November 2019, the documentary Seamus Heaney and the music of what happens was aired on BBC Two. His wife Marie and his children talked about their family life and read some of the poems he wrote for them. For the first time, Heaney's four brothers remembered their childhood and the shared experiences that inspired many of his poems.

In 2022, The Translations of Seamus Heaney was published, edited by Marco Sonzogni.

In 2023, The Letters of Seamus Heaney was published, edited by Christopher Reid.

In 2025, The Poems of Seamus Heaney was published, edited by Bernard O'Donoghue and Rosie Lavan. It encompasses all the poems Heaney published in his lifetime as well as the small number that appeared after his death: twelve single volumes, from Death of a Naturalist (1966) to Human Chain (2010), and those poems published in pamphlets, journals and magazines or with limited circulation. In addition, the book includes a small selection of previously unseen material.

== Publications ==
=== Poetry: Main Collections ===
- 1966: Death of a Naturalist, Faber & Faber
- 1969: Door into the Dark, Faber & Faber
- 1972: Wintering Out, Faber & Faber
- 1975: North, Faber & Faber
- 1979: Field Work, Faber & Faber
- 1984: Station Island, Faber & Faber
- 1987: The Haw Lantern, Faber & Faber
- 1991: Seeing Things, Faber & Faber
- 1996: The Spirit Level, Faber & Faber
- 2001: Electric Light, Faber & Faber
- 2006: District and Circle, Faber & Faber
- 2010: Human Chain, Faber & Faber

=== Poetry: Selected Editions ===
- 1980: Selected Poems 1965–1975, Faber & Faber
- 1990: New Selected Poems 1966–1987, Faber & Faber
- 1998: Opened Ground: Poems 1966–1996, Faber & Faber
- 2014: New Selected Poems 1988–2013, Faber & Faber
- 2018: 100 Poems, Faber & Faber
- 2025: The Poems of Seamus Heaney, Faber & Faber

=== Prose: Main Collections ===
- 1980: Preoccupations: Selected Prose 1968–1978, Faber & Faber
- 1988: The Government of the Tongue, Faber & Faber
- 1995: The Redress of Poetry: Oxford Lectures, Faber & Faber
- 2008: Stepping Stones: Interviews With Seamus Heaney, Faber & Faber
- 2023: The Letters of Seamus Heaney, Faber & Faber

=== Prose: Selected Editions ===
- 2001: Finders Keepers: Selected Prose 1971–2001, Faber & Faber

=== Plays ===
- 1990: The Cure at Troy: A version of Sophocles' Philoctetes, Field Day
- 2004: The Burial at Thebes: A version of Sophocles' Antigone, Faber & Faber

=== Translations ===
- 1983: Sweeney Astray: A version from the Irish, Field Day
- 1992: Sweeney's Flight (with Rachel Giese, photographer), Faber & Faber
- 1993: The Midnight Verdict: Translations from the Irish of Brian Merriman and from the Metamorphoses of Ovid, Gallery Press
- 1995: Laments, a cycle of Polish Renaissance elegies by Jan Kochanowski, translated with Stanisław Barańczak, Faber & Faber
- 1999: Beowulf: A New Verse Translation, Faber & Faber
- 1999: Diary of One Who Vanished, a song cycle by Leoš Janáček of poems by Ozef Kalda, Faber & Faber
- 2009: The Testament of Cresseid & Seven Fables, Faber & Faber
- 2016: Aeneid: Book VI, Faber & Faber
- 2022: The Translations of Seamus Heaney, Faber & Faber

=== Limited Editions and Booklets (poetry, prose, and translations) ===
- 1965: Eleven Poems, Queen's University
- 1968: The Island People, BBC
- 1968: Room to Rhyme, Arts Council N.I.
- 1969: A Lough Neagh Sequence, Phoenix
- 1970: Night Drive, Gilbertson
- 1973: Munro, BBC
- 1970: A Boy Driving His Father to Confession, Sceptre Press
- 1973: Explorations, BBC
- 1975: Stations, Ulsterman Publications
- 1975: Bog Poems, Rainbow Press
- 1975: The Fire i' the Flint, Oxford University Press
- 1976: Four Poems, Crannog Press
- 1977: Glanmore Sonnets, Editions Monika Beck
- 1977: In Their Element, Arts Council N.I.
- 1978: Robert Lowell: A Memorial Address and an Elegy, Faber & Faber
- 1978: The Makings of a Music, University of Liverpool
- 1978: After Summer, Gallery Press
- 1979: Hedge School, Janus Press
- 1979: Ugolino, Carpenter Press
- 1979: Gravities, Charlotte Press
- 1979: A Family Album, Byron Press
- 1980: Toome, National College of Art and Design
- 1981: Sweeney Praises the Trees, Henry Pearson
- 1982: A Personal Selection, Ulster Museum
- 1982: Poems and a Memoir, Limited Editions Club
- 1983: An Open Letter, Field Day
- 1983: Among Schoolchildren, Queen's University
- 1984: Verses for a Fordham Commencement, Nadja Press
- 1984: Hailstones, Gallery Press
- 1985: From the Republic of Conscience, Amnesty International
- 1985: Place and Displacement, Dove Cottage
- 1985: Towards a Collaboration, Arts Council N.I.
- 1986: Clearances, Cornamona Press
- 1988: Readings in Contemporary Poetry, DIA Art Foundation
- 1988: The Sounds of Rain, Emory University
- 1988: The Dark Wood, Colin Smythe
- 1989: An Upstairs Outlook, Linen Hall Library
- 1989: The Place of Writing, Emory University
- 1990: The Tree Clock, Linen Hall Library
- 1991: Squarings, Hieroglyph Editions
- 1992: Dylan the Durable, Bennington College
- 1992: The Gravel Walks, Lenoir Rhyne College
- 1992: The Golden Bough, Bonnefant Press
- 1993: Keeping Going, Bow and Arrow Press
- 1993: Joy or Night, University of Swansea
- 1994: Extending the Alphabet, Memorial University of Newfoundland
- 1994: Speranza in Reading, University of Tasmania
- 1995: Oscar Wilde Dedication, Westminster Abbey
- 1995: Charles Montgomery Monteith, All Souls College
- 1995: Crediting Poetry: The Nobel Lecture, Gallery Press
- 1996: Commencement Address, UNC Chapel Hill
- 1997: Poet to Blacksmith, Pim Witteveen
- 1997: An After Dinner Speech, Atlantic Foundation
- 1998: Audenesque, Maeght
- 1999: The Light of the Leaves, Bonnefant Press
- 1999: Ballynahinch Lake, Sonzogni
- 2001: Something to Write Home About, Flying Fox
- 2001: Towers, Trees, Terrors, Università degli Studi di Urbino
- 2002: The Whole Thing: on the Good of Poetry, The Recorder
- 2002: Hope and History, Rhodes University
- 2002: A Keen for the Coins, Lenoir Rhyne College
- 2002: Hallaig, Sorley MacLean Trust
- 2002: Arion, a poem by Alexander Pushkin, translated from Russian, with a note by Olga Carlisle, Arion Press
- 2003: Eclogues in Extremis, Royal Irish Academy
- 2003: Squarings, Arion Press
- 2004: Anything can Happen, Town House Publishers
- 2004: Room to Rhyme, University of Dundee
- 2004: The Testament of Cresseid, Enitharmon Press
- 2004: Columcille The Scribe, The Royal Irish Academy
- 2005: A Tribute to Michael McLaverty, Linen Hall Library
- 2005: The Door Stands Open, Irish Writers Centre
- 2005: A Shiver, Clutag Press
- 2007: The Riverbank Field, Gallery Press
- 2008: Articulations, Royal Irish Academy
- 2008: One on a Side, Robert Frost Foundation
- 2009: Spelling It Out, Gallery Press
- 2010: Writer & Righter, Irish Human Rights Commission
- 2012: Stone From Delphi, Arion Press
- 2013: The Last Walk, Gallery Press
- 2019: My Yeats, Yeats Society Sligo

=== Spoken word ===
- 2009: Collected Poems (audio recording by Heaney), RTÉ with the Lannan Foundation

== Prizes and honours ==
- 1966: Eric Gregory Award
- 1967: Cholmondeley Award
- 1968: Somerset Maugham Award
- 1968: Geoffrey Faber Memorial Prize
- 1975: E. M. Forster Award
- 1975: Duff Cooper Prize for North
- 1995: Nobel Prize in Literature
- 1996: Commandeur de l'Ordre des Arts et des Lettres
- 1997: Elected Saoi of Aosdána
- 1998: St. Louis Literary Award from the Saint Louis University Library Associates
- 2000: Elected to the American Philosophical Society
- 2000: Fiddler's Green Festival Creative Arts Award
- 2001: Golden Wreath of Poetry, given by Struga Poetry Evenings for life achievement in the field of poetry
- 2004: Kenyon Review Award for Literary Achievement
- 2005: Irish PEN Award
- 2006: T. S. Eliot Prize for District and Circle
- 2007: Poetry Now Award for District and Circle
- 2009: David Cohen Prize
- 2011: Poetry Now Award for Human Chain
- 2011: Bob Hughes Lifetime Achievement Award
- 2012: Griffin Poetry Prize, Lifetime Recognition Award

== See also ==
- List of Nobel laureates in Literature
- List of Irish Nobel laureates and nominees
- List of people on the postage stamps of Ireland
