= Selected Poems 1965–1975 =

1980 book by Seamus Heaney

- First edition
- Author: Seamus Heaney
- Language: English
- Publisher: Faber and Faber
- Publication date: 1980
- Publication place: Ireland
- Media type: Print
- Pages: 136
- ISBN: 978-0-571-11644-7

Selected Poems 1965–1975 is a poetry collection by Seamus Heaney, who received the 1995 Nobel Prize in Literature. It was published in 1980 by Faber and Faber (and published in the United States as Poems 1965–1975 by Farrar, Straus and Giroux, 1981). It includes selections from Heaney's first four volumes of verse:

- Death of a Naturalist (1966)
- Door into the Dark (1969)
- Wintering Out (1972)
- North (1975)
