= Robert Whitehill (poet) =

American Hebrew poet (born 1947)

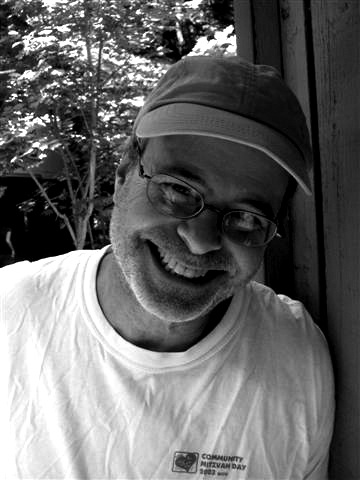
Hebrew poet Robert Whitehill

Samuel Robert Whitehill (Hebrew: רוברט וייטהיל־בשן; born 1947) is an American Hebrew poet and a translator.

== Biography ==
Robert Whitehill was born in 1947 in High Point, North Carolina, and grew up in Lubbock, Texas, where he attended Texas Tech University. Although he was raised with little Jewish identity, Whitehill was fascinated by Israel and Zionism. Starting at the age of 15, Whitehill studied Hebrew using self-help books and vinyl records, then found his first Hebrew conversational partner in a fellow Texas Tech student—an Israeli Arab. At age 21, Whitehill made his first trip to Israel, where he enrolled in a two-month intensive Hebrew course. Upon his return, Whitehill enrolled at University of Texas at Austin, where he received a Juris Doctor as well as a master's degree in English literature. He met his future wife, Susan Lilly, at the university, and married her in 1978.

During the 1970s, Whitehill wrote his first Hebrew poem, which was accepted by the now-defunct Hebrew periodical Hadoar. Whitehill entered into correspondence with Israeli author and playwright Aharon Megged and translated several of Megged's novels into English. Although Hadoar rejected his later poems, Megged helped Whitehill to get his work published in the Israeli daily newspapers Ha’aretz and Davar. In 1976, Whitehill translated his first book, the collection Rustic Sunset and Other Stories by Israeli screenplay writer and journalist Yitzhak Ben Ner. With the help of Israeli poet Simon Halkin, Israeli lyricist Yossi Gamzu, and Aharon Megged, Whitehill wrote his first poetry collection entitled Orvim Humim ("Brown Crows"). It was published in Israel in 1977. Whitehill's second collection, Efes Makom ("No Place"), was published in Israel in 1981.

In 1983, Whitehill and his family moved from Austin, Texas to the Washington, D.C. suburb of Potomac, Maryland. In 1985 and 1988, Whitehill and Lilly had two more children, both daughters. In the D.C. area, Whitehill worked for the Federal Communications Commission, in the low-power broadcasting regulation division. In 1990, Whitehill started his own import-export company, Whitehill Trade Services, which primarily traded glassware, electronics, and urea-formaldehyde between the United States, Israel, and China.

In a March 2006 article in Commentary Magazine, Michael Weingrad discussed Whitehill's growing poetry collection and the Texan's anomalous maturation into a Hebrew poet. The article distinguished Whitehill as "probably the only non-Israeli publishing fine Hebrew poetry today."

Whitehill's third book, After the Silence, was published by Carmel Publishing Company, Jerusalem, in June 2007. A fourth book, "Tap Dancing Through Black Holes," was published by Hakibutz Hameuhad Publishing Company, in January 2014.
