= Nigel Newton =

American-born British publisher (born 1955)

Nigel Newton CBE
- Born: 16 June 1955 (age 71); San Francisco, California, U.S.
- Education: Selwyn College, Cambridge
- Occupations: Founder and Executive Chairman, Bloomsbury Publishing
- Spouse: Joanna Newton
- Children: 3
- Parent(s): Peter Newton; Anne St. Aubyn
- Relatives: Kenneth Newton (uncle)

Nigel Newton CBE (born 16 June 1955) is an American-born British publisher. He is the founder and Executive Chairman of Bloomsbury Publishing.

== Early life ==
Nigel Newton was born on 16 June 1955 in San Francisco, California. He was born to an American mother and an English father. His father, Peter Newton, was a Napa Valley winemaker, the founder of Sterling Vineyards and Newton Vineyard.

Newton earned a degree in English at Selwyn College, Cambridge.

== Career ==
Newton began his career as assistant to the sales director at Macmillan. He later worked for Sidgwick and Jackson.

Newton conceived the idea of Bloomsbury in 1984 and the name of the company shortly thereafter; he first approached David Reynolds to join him in 1985 and later they brought on board Liz Calder and Alan Wherry. The four of them launched the company together in 1986.

In 2020, Newton received the London Book Fair Lifetime Achievement Award.

He was appointed Commander of the Order of the British Empire (CBE) in the 2021 New Year Honours for services to the publishing industry.

In 2022, he was appointed president of the Publishers Association, taking over the post from David Shelley.

== Personal life ==
Newton is married to Joanna, they have three children and live in London and East Sussex.
