= Ric Forman =

American winemaker

Richard ("Ric") Forman is an American winemaker, vineyard manager, and consultant, who has made contributions to the rise of Napa Valley as one of the premier winemaking regions of the world.

== Details ==
Forman is credited with introducing vintage-dated Merlot, and (along with Dick Graff) barrel fermentation of white wines, to California. Forman was long-time winemaker of Sterling Vineyards. After leaving Sterling he helped found Newton Vineyard. He was also instrumental in the founding of Duckhorn Vineyards. Later, he befriended rancher David Abreu, with whom he co-founded both Abreu Vineyards Management, a vineyard management company, and a winery, Abreu Vineyards.

Forman is considered an expert in non-malolactic Chardonnay. Forman is also a strong advocate for minimal intervention in winemaking. He prefers to let the natural qualities of the grapes and the vineyard express themselves in the finished wine. He uses high-quality French oak barrels for aging his wines, but he is careful to ensure that the oak influence does not overpower the fruit. Forman's wines are known for their balance and elegance. He strives to produce wines that are approachable in their youth but also have the potential to age gracefully for many years.
