= Castellacci =

Castellacci is a surname. Notable people with the surname include:

- Agostino Castellacci (born 1670), Italian painter
- Francesco Castellacci (born 1987), Italian racing driver
- Luigi Castellacci (1797–1845), Italian musician and composer

== See also ==
- Castellucci
