= The Two Pound Tram =

2003 novel by 'William Newton'

- First edition
- Author: 'William Newton'
- Language: English
- Publisher: Bloomsbury
- Publication date: 2003
- Publication place: United Kingdom
- Media type: Print, audio & ebook
- Pages: 192
- ISBN: 0-7475-6697-6

The Two Pound Tram is a novel written by William Newton (a pseudonym of Kenneth Newton, a retired doctor). It was first published in 2003 to great acclaim and won the 2004 Society of Authors Sagittarius Prize (for first novelists over the age of 60). It sold 60,000 copies in Britain and was also successful in America and Germany.

== Publication ==
In 2003 the author invited his nephew Nigel Newton, founder of Bloomsbury Publishing, to lunch at the Garrick Club in London. His nephew was horrified to hear that Kenneth had written a novel: publishers are swamped with new novels, and being a relative Nigel was put in a difficult position. To avoid direct involvement, he passed the text to his editorial staff, and it was published to great acclaim later that year.

== Plot ==
The main story begins in 1937 when brothers Wilfred and Duncan Scrutton run away from their home at Ferring near Worthing on the Sussex coast and travel to London. Wilfred, the narrator, recounts how they had seen an advert in the Daily Mail which said 'Trams surplus to the requirements of the London Omnibus and Tramcar Company for sale at their depot at Acton, London for £2 each.'

The brothers pool their resources and travel to the depot, where they are told that trams are indeed for sale but have to be collected and cannot be delivered to Sussex. The only candidate is an old horse-drawn tram, for which they manage to secure a horse called Homer from a retired rag and bone man. Unfortunately, the depot has no destination boards for Sussex, but they do have one for Canterbury — for which the brothers set off via the Old Kent Road, accompanied by Homer's companion, a dog called Tiger. They gain fare-paying passengers at Harbledown and begin a regular if slow service between there and Canterbury, and also acquire a conductor called Hattie, but rival companies eventually force them to move on due to the lack of a PSV operator's license. They travel back to Worthing and gain the support of the wealthy resident of Goring Hall, who, inspired by their determination, funds the purchase and transport of an electric tram from Acton; this is renovated and put into service in Worthing town centre.

The second half of the novel concerns events during World War II, the brothers volunteering for both the LDV and ARP and Hattie for the VAD.

== Reception ==
- 'Rather like Daisy Ashford's The Young Visiters this is a charming, miniature oddity', Sunday Telegraph
- 'Newton is a wonderful find, it's my book of the year and I shall give it to everyone for Christmas', Angela Huth, The Spectator
- 'Goes on haunting the reader's imagination long after he has put the book down . . . I loved it', Clive Aslet, Country Life
