= Jagendorf =

Jagendorf is a surname. Notable people with the surname include:

- André Jagendorf (1926–2017), American professor of plant biology
- Moritz Jagendorf (1888–1981), Austrian-American folklore author
- Zvi Jagendorf (born 1936), Israeli writer
