= Peter Newton =

Peter Newton may refer to:

- Peter Newton (canoeist) (born 1970), American sprint kayaker
- Peter Newton (vintner) (1926–2008), English-born American winemaker
