= Alastair Niven =

English literary scholar and author (1944–2025)

Alastair Niven LVO OBE
- Born: Alastair Neil Robertson Niven; 25 February 1944; Edinburgh, Scotland
- Died: 26 March 2025 (aged 81)
- Education: Dulwich College; Gonville and Caius College, Cambridge; University of Ghana; University of Leeds
- Occupations: Literary scholar and author
- Awards: Benson Medal, 2021

Alastair Neil Robertson Niven LVO OBE (25 February 1944 – 26 March 2025) was an English literary scholar and author. He wrote books on D. H. Lawrence, Raja Rao, and Mulk Raj Anand, and over the years served as Director General of The Africa Centre, Director of Literature at the Arts Council of Great Britain and of the British Council, a principal of Cumberland Lodge, and president of English PEN. In 2021, Niven was chosen as the recipient of the Benson Medal from the Royal Society of Literature, awarded for exceptional contribution to literature.

== Education ==
Born in Edinburgh, Scotland on 25 February 1944, Niven was educated at Dulwich College in London and at Gonville and Caius College, Cambridge, and was then a Commonwealth Scholar for two years (1968–69) at the University of Ghana, where he "first researched in the field of African literature", receiving his master's degree and lecturing in English literature there. He next lectured in English literature at the University of Leeds, where he received his Doctorate, and then taught English Studies at Stirling University (1970–78), where he was given charge of Commonwealth literature.

== Scholarship and academic work ==
In the 1970s, Niven wrote the first of several books. His 1978 study, D. H. Lawrence: The Novels, was reviewed as "an excellent introduction to Lawrence as an artist and as a thinker", and as "particularly useful for its full treatment of the neglected or downgraded novels". Niven's 1980 book, D. H. Lawrence: The Writer and His Work, was reviewed in the Los Angeles Times Book Review as "a brief yet substantial commentary on the Lawrence work", though with "few fresh insights". The review noted that Niven "does focus some welcome attention on several less-lauded works", and that Niven's "defense of Lawrence's underrated plays should interest any serious Lawrence scholar."

From 1978 to 1984, Niven was Director General of The Africa Centre, London; there, as Olu Alake notes, "he expanded the literary programme, staging over 60 plays including The Trial of Dedan Kimathi and hosting giants such as Chinua Achebe, Ngugi wa Thiong'o, Buchi Emecheta, Bessie Head, Wole Soyinka, Ben Okri, CLR James and Samuel Selvon." Other notable figures invited to give readings and talks at the Africa Centre included Nuruddin Farah, Elechi Amadi, Dennis Brutus, Njabulo Ndebele, Jack Mapanje, Flora Nwapa, Gabriel Okara, Sembene Ousmane, Amos Tutuola and Naomi Mitchison.

Niven was at various times "an executive member of the Association for Commonwealth Literature and Language Studies and a member of the Commonwealth Institute Working Party on Library Holdings of Commonwealth Literature". In 1978, he became editor of the Journal of Commonwealth Literature, serving in the role for the next 13 years, until 1991.

From 1987 to 1997, he was Director of Literature at the Arts Council of Great Britain (where he set up the first Literature in Translation programme), and from 1997 to 2001 was the British Council's director of literature.

The Arvon Foundation is among many literary charitable organisations that in the 1980s and 1990s benefited from Niven's support in their development.

== Booker Prize work and other literary activities ==
Niven was a judge for the Booker Prize in 1994, and for the Man Booker Prize in 2014. In 2017, Niven argued that allowing American authors to contend for the Booker award would not lead to American dominance, pointing to authors from other countries having won recent international literary awards. The following year, he opposed efforts to drop American authors from contention for the Booker Prize. In support of the wide international eligibility of applicants, he described "the development of the English language into a number of different Englishes, which can then be compared and contrasted" as "one of the unifying features of the literature."

In 2000–2001, Niven served on the International Advisory Board of the Raja Rao Award for Literature, and he also in 2001 joined the advisory board of Wasafiri magazine (founded in 1984 by Susheila Nasta), for which he was a contributor over many years. He was Principal of the King George VI and Queen Elizabeth Foundation of St. Catherine at Cumberland Lodge in Windsor from 2001 to 2013, and "held the unique double of being Director of Literature at the Arts Council of Great Britain (later Arts Council England) for 10 years and Director of Literature at the British Council for four." He was president of English PEN from 2003 to 2007, and Chairman of the Commonwealth Writers' Prize. He was Associate Director for Education of the non-profit Iraq Britain Business Council (IBBC) for several years after its founding in 2009.

In the 2012 Birthday Honours, Niven was made a Lieutenant of the Royal Victorian Order (LVO), personally conferred by Queen Elizabeth II. He was a jury member for the 2012 DSC Prize for South Asian Literature.

In 2017, he was Chair of Judges for the Saif Ghobash Banipal Prize for Arabic Literary Translation.

In 2019, he supported a fundraiser to preserve an antique annotated copy of D. H. Lawrence's Lady Chatterley's Lover used as an exhibit in the famous obscenity trial, R v Penguin Books Ltd. Having written two books about Lawrence, Niven commented: "He has served me well and the least I can do now is help in his hour of need."

Niven was also a trustee of the Stephen Spender Trust for more than five years.

As co-chair of the events committee of the English-Speaking Union (ESU), Niven was "in conversation" with notable figures including Jatinder Verma, William Waldegrave, Matthew Rycroft, and Malcolm Rifkind.

Niven's memoir, In Glad or Sorry Hours, was published in February 2021 (Starhaven, ISBN 9780936315485).

In 2021, he was elected an Honorary Fellow of the Royal Society of Literature (RSL). He was also awarded the Benson Medal, given by the RSL to honour service to literature across a whole career, and on receiving it Niven said: "It never occurred to me that I might myself become a recipient of an award like this and to be part of that lineage stretching right back to the early days of Lytton Strachey and then through people like Forster, who I incidentally met when I was at Cambridge, very briefly, a shy and rather delightful man who you used to see shuffling into dinner every evening. And then later people I'd met and written on like R.K. Narayan, Nadine Gordimer, Wole Soyinka. I love to see that I am in the company of Susheila Nasta, Liz Calder, Boyd Tonkin and Margaret Busby, a very long-standing friend, and so many others. It means a huge amount to me to get this Medal. I feel really, really honoured by it."

== Personal life and death ==
In 1970, Niven married Helen Trow, whom he met during his time in Ghana where she was a VSO volunteer, and they had two children.

Niven died on 26 March 2025, at the age of 81. In an obituary in The Guardian, which included words of tribute from Bernardine Evaristo describing Niven as a "fantastic advocate" for literature, Boyd Tonkin stated: "The foremost literary administrator and diplomat of his time, he opened up the Arts Council, the British Council and other bodies to the creative energies of Africa, Asia, the Caribbean, and their diasporic communities in the UK. Later the principal of a royal foundation in Windsor, he could appear as a paladin of the establishment. But he was always more of a gate-opener – and pathfinder – than gatekeeper."

== Awards and honours ==
- 2001: appointed an OBE in New Year Honours List
- 2012: appointed a Lieutenant of the Royal Victorian Order (LVO)
- Honorary Fellow of Harris Manchester College, University of Oxford
- 2021: elected as an Honorary Fellow of the Royal Society of Literature
- 2021: recipient of the Benson Medal from the Royal Society of Literature, for his exceptional contribution to literature

== Publications ==
In addition to his books, Niven was the author of "over fifty articles on aspects of Commonwealth and post-colonial literature", and also wrote "extensively about the welfare of overseas students". For The Guardian newspaper, he contributed many obituaries of notable literary figures, including James Berry, Elechi Amadi, Ranjana Ash, Pauline Neville, Carole Seymour-Jones and Ion Trewin.

- The Commonwealth Writer Overseas (1976)
- D. H. Lawrence: The Novels (1978)
- The Yoke of Pity: A Study in the Fictional Writings of Mulk Raj Anand (1978)
- D. H. Lawrence, the writer and his work (1980)
- Under Another Sky: The Commonwealth Poetry Prize Anthology (1987) – editor
- Truth Within Fiction: A study of Raja Rao's The Serpent & the Rope (1987)
- Enigmas and Arrivals: An Anthology of Commonwealth Writing (1997) – co-editor with Michael Schmidt, to mark the 10th anniversary of the Commonwealth Writers' Prize
- "Jack Mapanje: A Chameleon in Prison", Poetry Review 80, no. 4 (1990–91): 49–51
- In Glad or Sorry Hours, Starhaven Press, 2021, ISBN 9780936315485
