= The Concubine (novel) =

1966 novel by Elechi Amadi

- Author: Elechi Amadi
- Original title: The story concerns a woman of great beauty and dignity who inadvertently brings suffering and death to all her lovers
- Language: English
- Series: African Writers Series
- Genre: Literary Fiction
- Publisher: Heinemann
- Publication date: 1966
- Publication place: Nigeria
- Media type: Print (Paperback)
- Pages: 216 pp
- Followed by: The Great Ponds

The Concubine is the debut novel by Nigerian writer Elechi Amadi originally published in 1966 as part of the Heinemann African Writers Series.

Set in a remote village in Eastern Nigeria, an area yet to be affected by European values and where society is orderly and predictable, the story concerns a woman "of great beauty and dignity" who inadvertently brings suffering and death to all her lovers.

The novel portrays a society still ruled by traditional gods, offering a glimpse into the human relationships that such a society creates.

On its publication in London by Heinemann Educational Books, The Concubine was hailed as a "most accomplished first performance" and "an outstanding work of pure fiction". A critical study of the novel was written by Alastair Niven, who called it: "an example of how an absence of conscious sophistication or experimentation can result in a novel of classic simplicity.... Rooted firmly among the hunting and fishing villages of the Niger delta, The Concubine nevertheless possesses the timelessness and universality of a major novel."

The Concubine has been made into a film, written by Elechi Amadi and directed by Nollywood director Andy Amenechi; the film was premiered in Abuja in March 2007.

== Content ==
The Concubine tells the story of Ihuoma, a stunningly beautiful and kind woman who cannot seem to have a typical romantic relationship, especially marriage due to her suitors dying under different mysterious circumstances.

Ihuoma's first husband is Emenike who died after fighting Madume, who also desires Ihuoma for himself.

When Madume attempted to get Ihuoma's hand in marriage, he fails. He died by hanging himself after he was bitten in the face by a cobra.

The third suitor is Ekwueme, a handsome young man. When it was revealed that Ihuoma is a sea-goddess who cannot be married to any mortal man, Ekwueme decided to perform a ritual of appeasement to the Sea-King at midnight. He died when one of Ihuoma's children mistakenly shot him with an arrow in his attempt to get a red male lizard needed for the ritual.

== Characters ==
- Ekwuem
- Madume
- Ihuoma
- Emenike
- Ahurole
- Anyika
- Wigwe
