= Spring Mountain District AVA =

American Viticultural Area in Napa County, California, United States

Coordinates: 38°30′28″N 122°29′33″W

Spring Mountain District
- Wine region
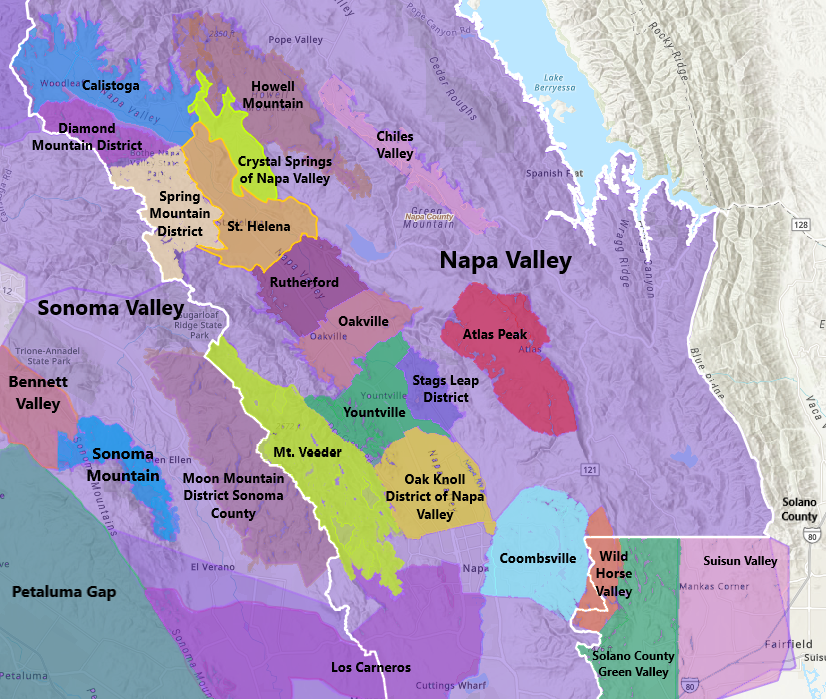
- Type: American Viticultural Area
- Year established: 1993
- Years of wine industry: 159
- Country: United States
- Part of: Napa Valley AVA
- Other regions in Napa Valley AVA: Atlas Peak AVA, Calistoga AVA, Chiles Valley AVA, Diamond Mountain District AVA, Howell Mountain AVA, Los Carneros AVA, Mt. Veeder AVA, Coombsville AVA Oak Knoll District of Napa Valley AVA, Oakville AVA, Rutherford AVA, St. Helena AVA, Stags Leap District AVA, Wild Horse Valley AVA, Yountville AVA
- Climate region: Region II
- Precipitation (annual average): 37 inches (940 mm)
- Soil conditions: moderately deep and deep residual upland soils with mix derived from volcanic and sedimentary parent material
- Total area: 8,600 acres (13 sq mi)
- Size of planted vineyards: 800 acres (320 ha)
- No. of vineyards: 31+
- Grapes produced: Black Muscat, Cabernet Franc, Cabernet Sauvignon, Chardonnay, Merlot, Petit Verdot, Petite Sirah, Pinot Noir, Riesling, Sauvignon Blanc, Syrah / Shiraz, Zinfandel
- No. of wineries: 13

Spring Mountain District is an American Viticultural Area (AVA) located in the Napa County, California. It was established as the nation's 120^{th}, the state's 69^{th} and the county's ninth appellation on May 13, 1993 by the Bureau of Alcohol, Tobacco and Firearms (ATF), Treasury after reviewing the petition submitted by Michael Marston of Marston Vineyards and Fritz Maytag of York Creek Vineyards, on behalf of local vintners, proposing a viticultural area in Napa County named "Spring Mountain."

On December 2, 1992, the petitioner wrote to ATF to amend Its original petition by changing the proposed viticultural area name to "Spring Mountain District." Since the original petition had included evidence which supported both names, ATF Issued an amended notice of proposed rulemaking on February 17. 1993, and allowed a 30-day comment period to obtain comments on the amended name. On the basis of the information in the original petition and material presented in the comments of Spring Mountain Vineyard and the amended petition, ATF adopted the viticultural area with the boundaries proposed, and the name "Spring Mountain District."
The viticultural area encompasses about 8,600 acres (13.4 sq mi) and at the outset, cultivated approximately 1,000 acres (400 ha) on over thirty vineyards. Spring Mountain District lies entirely as a sub-appellation within Napa Valley AVA. The terrain consists primarily of east-facing slopes of varying steepness, ranging in elevation from 400 to 2,600 feet (120–790 m). Given the small crop yields on hillsides, the region represents less than 2% of Napa Valley wine.

== History ==
Early on, the name Spring Mountain was used in a regional context and did not refer to the name of a peak or prominent landform, rather than a particularly verdant area with numerous springs, and drained by several small streams. The appellation was among the first locations in Napa Valley to receive recognition as a grape growing region.

While grapes may have been grown in the area as early as the American Civil War, the first documented planting is that of Charles Lemme, who cultivated the 25 acres (10 ha) La Perla Vineyard just south of York Creek in 1874. Steady growth followed. In the 1880s, Jacob and Frederick Beringer, who had already opened their historic winery near St. Helena, planted a vineyard on Spring Mountain. Later in the decade, Fortune Chevalier, a Frenchman who had come to San Francisco during the Gold Rush, planted 25 acres (10 ha) and built a stone winery.

Most notable among the early growers was wealthy San Francisco banker and financier Tiburcio Parrott, who established a vineyard that he named Miravalle and built a Victorian-style home that still stands on the property. In 1893, a local newspaper reported: "Old vineyardists asked him [Parrott] what he expected to do among those hills and rocks, and when told by Mr. Parrott that he expected to raise grapes and produce wine unsurpassed in the world, they laughed at him and told him his hopes would never be realized." Parrott's wines took first place at the San Francisco Midwinter Fair the following year and a gold medal at the World's Fair two years later. The historic La Perla, Chevalier and Miravalle vineyards are now part of Spring Mountain Vineyard.

Grape growing and winemaking declined in Spring Mountain from 1910 to 1940 due to the onset of phylloxera and Prohibition. The first reawakening of viticulture came in 1946, when Fred and Eleanor McCrea planted a small vineyard north of Mill Creek, and then in 1953 founded a legendary winery called Stony Hill. The resurgence began in earnest in the late 1960s and 1970s — with the founding of several wineries, including Ritchie Creek, Yverdon, Spring Mountain Vineyard, Smith-Madrone and Robert Keenan. The name Spring Mountain was first used as an origin on Cabernet Sauvignon wines produced by Ritchie Creek in 1974.

== Terroir ==
=== Topography ===
The appellation sits on steep terraces of the Mayacamas Mountains separating Napa Valley from Sonoma Valley and the Santa Rosa Plain. It lies in a northwestern portion of the Napa Valley above and behind the town of St. Helena. The boundaries of the appellation extend from the top of the ridgeline on the western edge, tracing the Sonoma/Napa County border. From the ridgeline the boundaries extend down to the 400-foot (122 m) contour line at the eastern base of the hillside. The southern boundary is Sulphur Creek and one of its tributaries, while the northern boundary is Ritchie Creek.

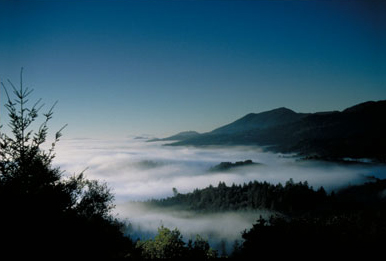
Spring Mountain overlooking Napa Valley.

=== Climate ===
Local topography and regional weather patterns make the Spring Mountain District the coolest and wettest appellation within the Napa Valley. These same factors create a diurnal fluctuation in temperature in the summertime that differs from other regions of the Napa Valley. Spring Mountain is only 30 miles (48 km) to the east of the Pacific Ocean. The coastal waters of northern California are strongly influenced by the California Current, an icy flow of water that originates near the Aleutian Islands. This cold current moderates the summer weather in the coastal valleys of Northern California.

Lying between the Spring Mountain appellation and the cold ocean current is a gap in the coastal mountains between Bodega and Tomales Bay and extending through the Santa Rosa Plain. Summer heat in the interior of California creates a low pressure area that draws cold air from the coast through this coastal gap and across the broad Santa Rosa plain. This on-shore air movement is bumped north by Sonoma Mountain pushing the cold air flow towards Santa Rosa Creek, the Northern Mayacamas Mountains, and directly at the Spring Mountain District AVA. The ridge of the Spring Mountain District is lower than Bald Mountain to its south and Diamond Mountain to its north. This lower ridgeline allows the cool, moist coastal air to enter the Napa Valley spilling down over forest and the vineyards that lie on the slopes of Spring Mountain and moderating peak daily temperatures.

A typical summer afternoon on Spring Mountain is cool, sometimes with "waterfalls" of fog tumbling over the western ridge and down through the canyons of the district. Into the evening, the cool air settles to the valley floor creating a cover of fog and warm air is lifted to the higher elevations. Nighttime temperature rise from this effect. Mornings warm more quickly on Spring Mountain than on the valley floor as most of the district lies above the morning fog line. The overall effect of this is moderately warm peak daily temperatures and moderately warm nighttime temperatures which keeps sugar accumulation in the berry in pace with flavor development.

The topography of the Spring Mountain District AVA also influences in the vineyards on the valley floor below it. While much of the Napa Valley depends on cooling from the San Pablo Bay, the vineyards in and around Saint Helena benefit from this second and direct source of coastal cooling that comes through the Spring Mountain District AVA. Also moderating summer temperatures in the appellation is the altitude of the vineyards; generally they are cooler at higher elevations. A final moderating influence is the district's predominantly eastern exposure which shades the district from the harsh afternoon sun. The topography influences climate over the entire year. Spring Mountain District AVA receives 10 inches (254 mm) to 15 inches (381 mm) more annual rainfall than the Napa Valley floor or the eastern slopes of the valley. Total precipitation can range as high as 70 inches (1,778 mm) to 95 inches (2,413 mm) in some of the wettest years. The USDA plant hardiness zone range is 9a to 9b.

=== Soils ===
Soil depths vary, but tend to be deeper than in nearby mountain terrain and shallower than on the valley floor. The region contains mostly residual upland soils with only a few areas of alluvial soils at the lower elevations. The soils are derived almost equally from Franciscan sedimentary rocks (sandstone and conglomerates) and Sonoma volcanic formations which are predominantly composed of Andesite. This equal mix of sedimentary and volcanic rocky soils distinguishes the region from adjacent mountain areas. To the north, in the Diamond Mountain area, soils are almost entirely of volcanic origin. To the south, in the Mount Veeder area, soils are primarily sedimentary.

== Viticulture ==
About 90% of the wine produced in the Spring Mountain District AVA is red. The predominating grape variety is Cabernet Sauvignon followed by Merlot. In addition to the other Bordelaise grape varieties of Cabernet Franc, Petit Verdot and Malbec, a few sites favor and support small plantings of Zinfandel, Syrah, Petite Sirah and on the coolest sites, even a little Pinot noir. Of the whites over half is Chardonnay. The other significant plantings of white grapes in the AVA are Sauvignon blanc and White Riesling.

== Vineyards and wineries ==
- Barnett Vineyards
- Behrens Family Vineyard
- Cain Vineyard & Winery
- Castellucci
- Fantesca Estate & Winery
- Frias Family Vineyard
- Juslyn Vineyards
- Lokoya Estate
- Lüscher-Ballard Vineyard
- Marston Family Vineyard
- Newton Vineyard
- Paloma Vineyard
- Peacock Family Vineyard
- Philip Togni Vineyard
- Pride Mountain Vineyards
- Ritchie Creek Vineyard
- Robert Keenan Winery
- Sarocka Estate
- School House Vineyard
- Schweiger Vineyards and Winery
- Smith-Madrone Vineyards and Winery
- Spring Mountain Vineyard
- Stony Hill Vineyard
- Sherwin Family Vineyards
- Vineyard 7 & 8
- York Creek Vineyards
