= Benson Medal =

Medal awarded by the British Royal Society of Literature since 1916

The Benson Medal is a medal awarded by the Royal Society of Literature in the UK.

It was founded in 1916 by A. C. Benson, who was a Fellow of the Society, to honour those who produce "meritorious works in poetry, fiction, history, and belles-lettres". The medal has been awarded several times to writers in other languages, and is occasionally awarded to those who are not writers, but who have done conspicuous service to literature.

The medal is awarded at irregular intervals for lifelong achievement. Recipients include:

Stella Benson (no relation), Edmund Blunden, Anita Desai, Maureen Duffy, E. M. Forster, Christopher Fry, John Gawsworth, Nadine Gordimer, Philip Larkin, R. K. Narayan A. L. Rowse, George Santayana, Wole Soyinka, Lytton Strachey, SuAndi, J. R. R. Tolkien, Helen Waddell and Rebecca West.

In November 2020, the new design for the medal by Linda Crook was unveiled. The design includes books on one side, and people on the other.

== Recipients ==
All recipients are listed on the Web site of the Royal Society of Literature.

- 2025: Richard Ovenden
- 2024: SuAndi
- 2022: Sandra Agard
- 2021: Alastair Niven
- 2020: Boyd Tonkin
- 2019: Susheila Nasta
- 2018: Liz Calder
- 2017: Margaret Busby, Carmen Callil, Mary-Kay Wilmers
- 2016: Christopher MacLehose
- 2015: Nancy Sladek
- 2014: Deirdre Le Faye, Valentina Polukhina
- 2013: Wm. Roger Louis
- 2012: David Pease, Jenny Uglow
- 2011: Diana Athill, Francis King

=== Earlier recipients ===
- 1917: Gabriele d'Annunzio; Benito Pérez Galdós; Maurice Barres
- 1923: Lytton Strachey
- 1925: Gordon Bottomley; George Santayana
- 1926: Percy Lubbock; Robert Wilson Lynd; Harold Nicolson
- 1927: Frederick Arthur Simpson; Helen Waddell
- 1930: Edmund Blunden
- 1931: Stella Benson; Siegfried Sassoon
- 1934: Edith Sitwell
- 1938: E. M. Forster; G. M. Young
- 1939: F. L. Lucas; Andrew Young
- 1940: Christopher Hassall; John Gawsworth
- 1941: Christopher La Farge
- 1952: Frederick S. Boas
- 1966: J. R. R. Tolkien; Rebecca West; E. V. Rieu
- 1969: Cecil Woodham-Smith
- 1975: Philip Larkin
- 1979: R. K. Narayan
- 1981: Sir Sacheverell Sitwell; Odysseas Elytis
- 1982: A. L. Rowse
- 1989: Anthony Burgess; Nadine Gordimer
- 1990: Wole Soyinka
- 1993: Julien Green
- 1996: Shusaku Endo
- 2000: Christopher Fry
- 2003: Anita Desai; David Sutton
- 2004: Maureen Duffy; James Parker
- 2005: Edward Upward
- 2006: Ronald Blythe; Joan Winterkorn – manuscript expert
- 2007: Nadine Gordimer
- 2008: John Saumarez Smith; Douglas Matthews
- 2009: Mark Le Fanu; Kay Dunbar
- 2010: Al Alvarez
