= Frank Newton (racing driver) =

British racing driver and engineer

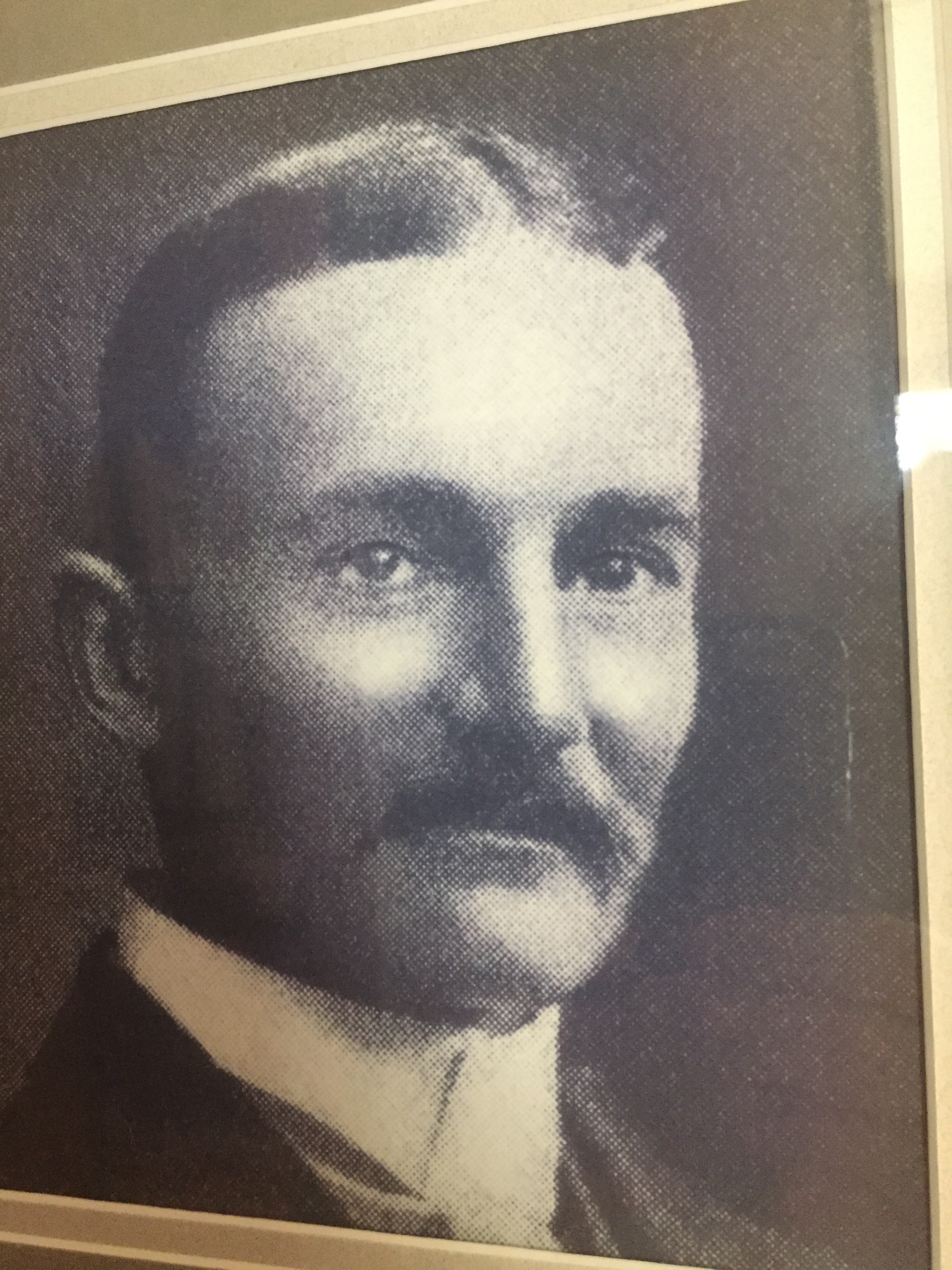
- Born: c.1868
- Died: 1963; Gerard's Cross, Buckinghamshire, England
- Occupation(s): Engineer, gold prospector, and racing driver
- Spouse: Margaret
- Children: 4, including Peter Newton and Kenneth Newton

Frank Newton (c.1868-1963) was a British racing driver and engineer.

== Career ==
Frank Newton was a gold prospector during Canada's Klondike Gold Rush era. He worked in the Yukon Territory of Alaska in circa 1895. Later Newton worked as an engineer, circa 1900, he designed and built the Trans-Andean railway which at the time was the world's highest elevation railroad. At the beginning of the 20th century, Newton returned to England to become a motor racing driver back home.

== Racing career ==
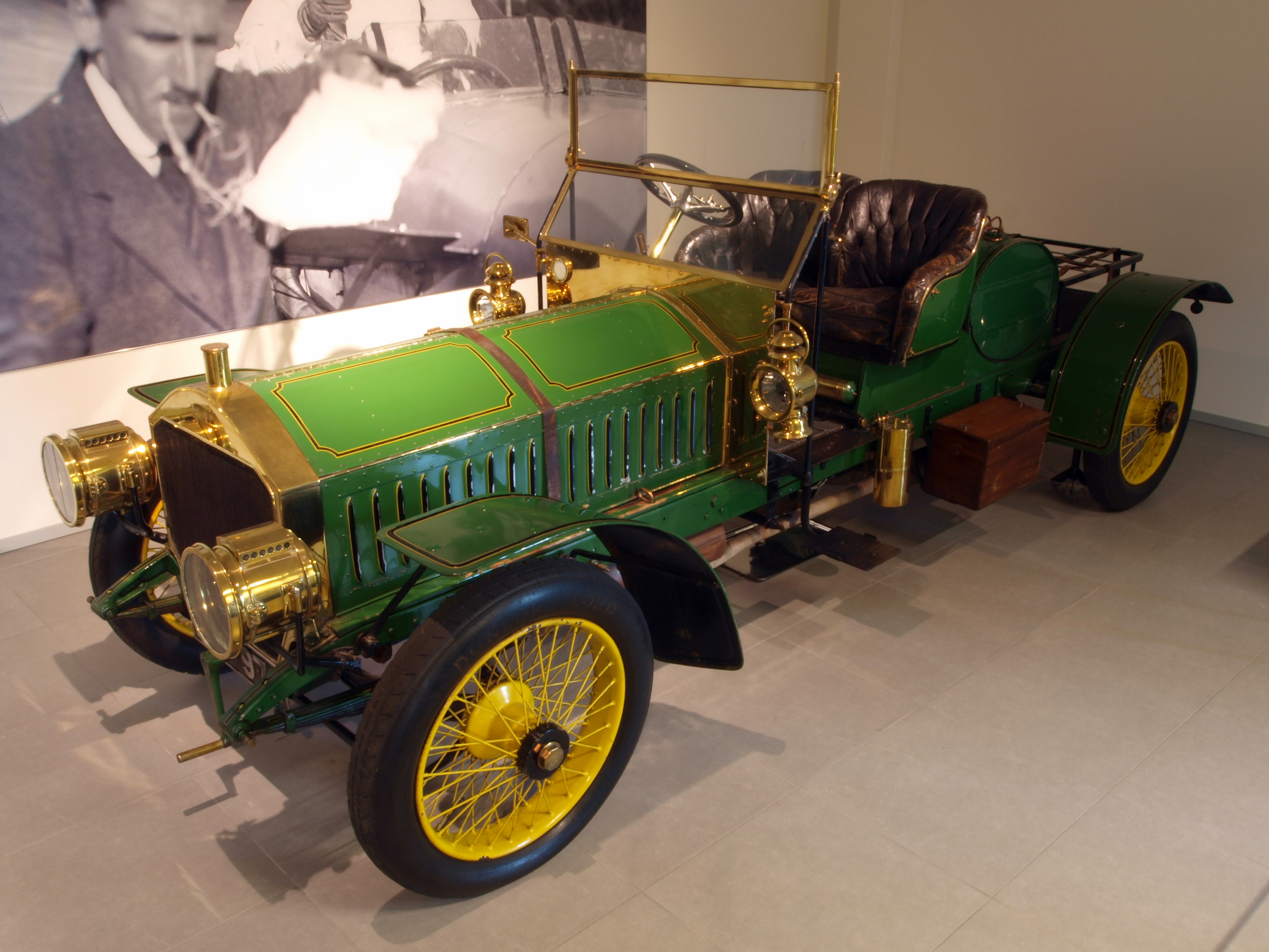
1907 Napier 60hp T21

In July 1907, Newton won the Century Stakes at the first meeting ever held at Brooklands, attended by 13,500 people.

On 23 September 1908, he won the Monatgu Cup at Brooklands, driving a Napier motor car nicknamed 'The Meteor', after having fought "a terrific duel" with Dario Resta, where their cars "banged wheels at top speed". "For a moment, it looked bad, but both drivers regained control." After the race The Brooklands Automobile Racing Club awarded Frank the Monatgu cup and was given a certificate authenticating that he drove 1 complete lap at an average speed of 113.01 MPH.

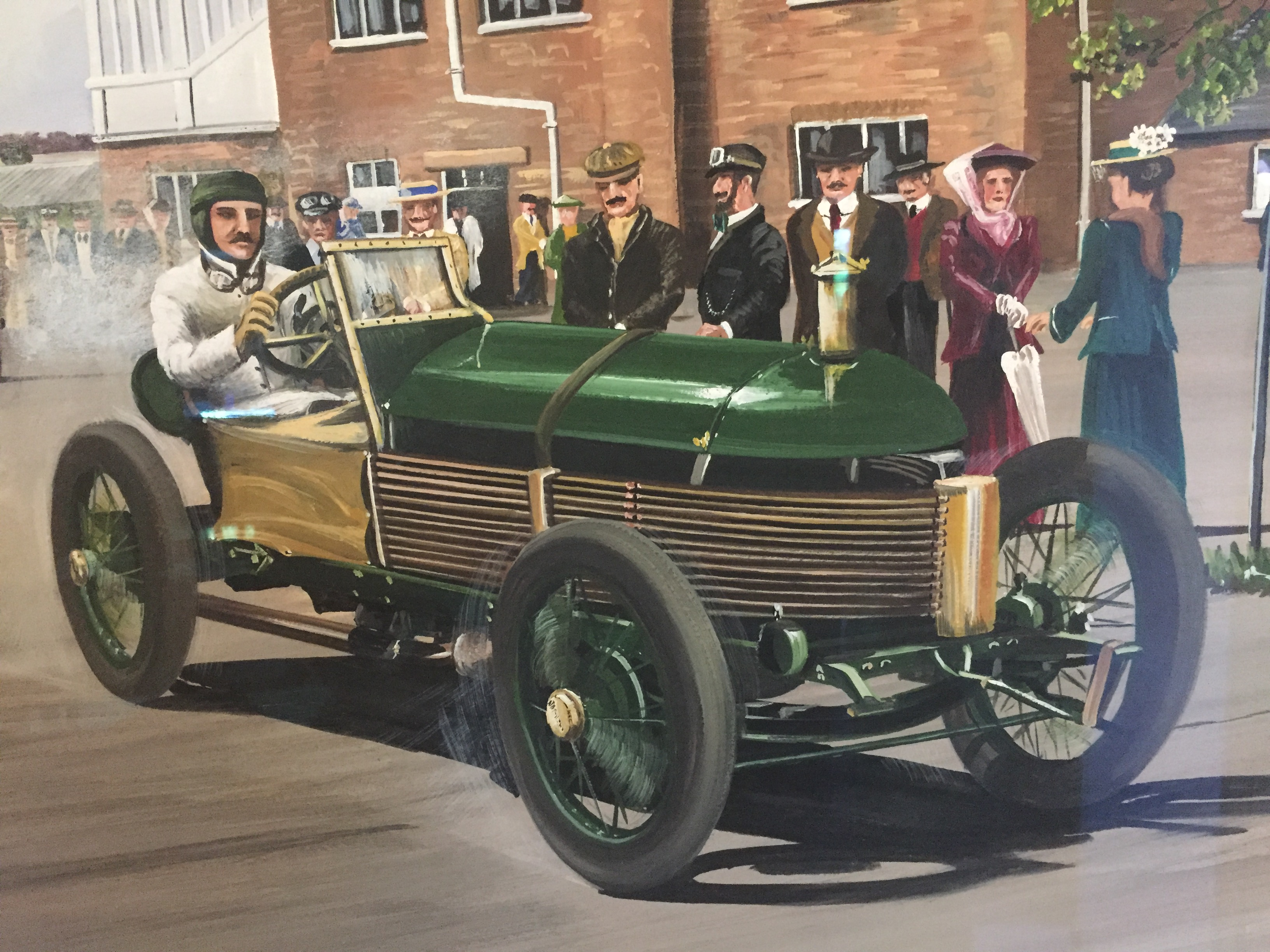
Painting of Frank driving 'The Meteor'

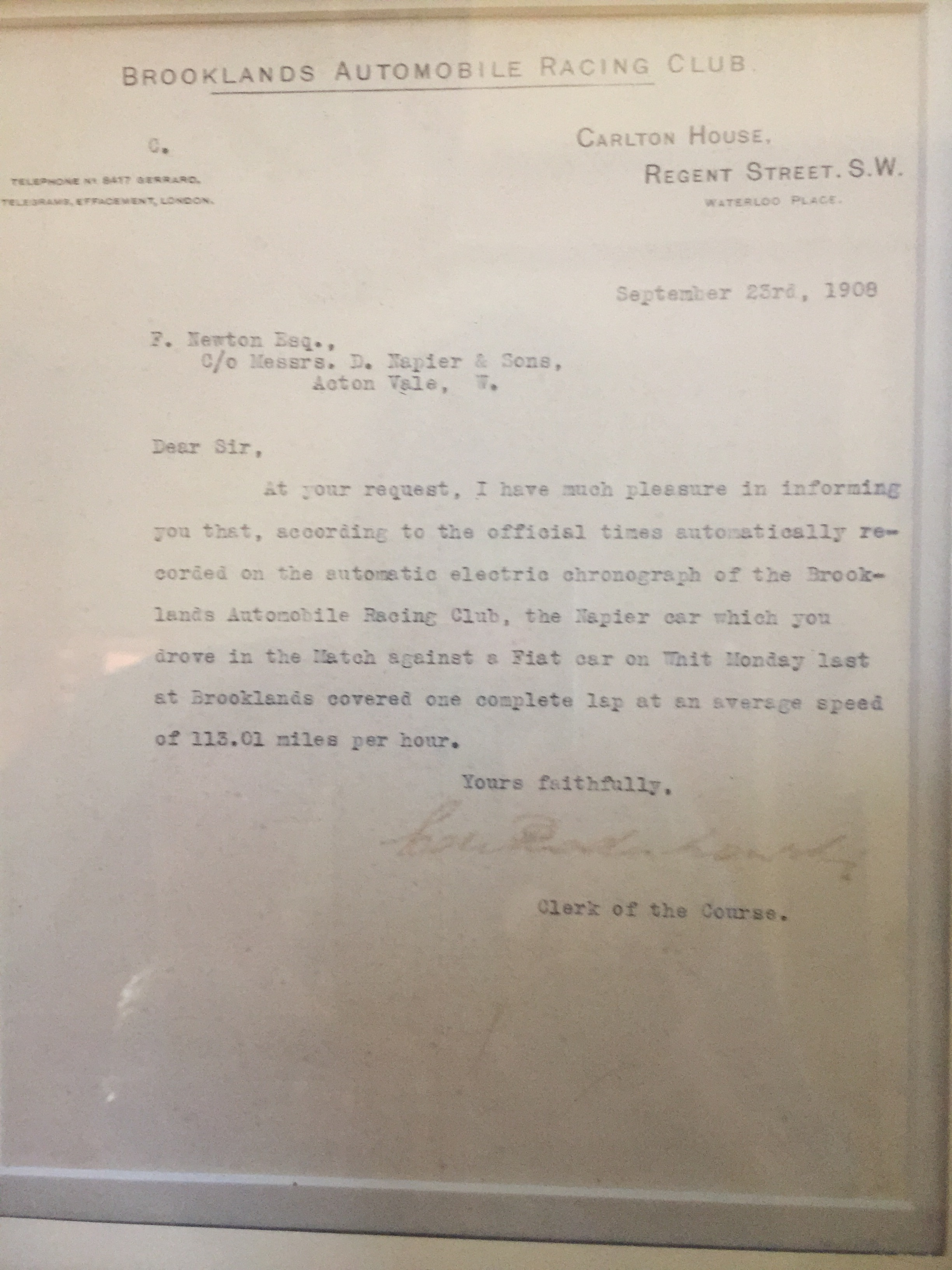
The certificate presented to Frank Newton by the Brooklands Automobile Racing Club in 1908.

In 1908, also at Brooklands, Newton drove a 90 hp Napier for its Australian owner Selwyn Edge, who had a £500 (equivalent to £66,000 in 2023) bet with D'Arcy Baker that his car could go faster than Felice Nazzaro's Fiat, but the Napier suffered from mechanical trouble.

Newton's preferred racing car was a Napier 90 hp.

== Personal life ==
Newton was married to Margaret, a keen gardener, and they had four children, Brenda Newton, Dudley Newton, Peter Newton and Kenneth Newton (in that order), when he was in his 50s and 60s.
