= Christopher MacLehose =

British publisher (born 1940)

Christopher MacLehose CBE, Hon. FRSL
- Born: Christopher Colin MacLehose; 12 July 1940 (age 86); Edinburgh, Scotland
- Education: Shrewsbury School; Worcester College, Oxford University
- Occupation: Publisher
- Known for: Founder of MacLehose Press; Mountain Leopard Press; Open Borders Press
- Awards: Benson Medal (2016)

Christopher Colin MacLehose CBE, Hon. FRSL (born 12 July 1940) is a British publisher notable as publisher of Harvill Press (from 1984 to 2004), where his successes included bringing out the stories of Raymond Carver and Richard Ford for the first time in Britain. Having published works translated from more than 34 languages, MacLehose has been referred to as "the champion of translated fiction" and as "British publishing's doyen of literature in translation". He is generally credited with introducing to an English-speaking readership the best-selling Swedish author Stieg Larsson and other prize-winning authors, among them Sergio De La Pava, who has described MacLehose as "an outsize figure literally and figuratively – that's an individual who has devoted his life to literature".

From 2008 to 2020, he was the publisher of MacLehose Press, an imprint of Quercus Books, and in 2021 founded Mountain Leopard Press, an imprint of the Welbeck Publishing Group. The Mountain Lion list was sold to Hachette in December 2022. In 2024, it was announced that MacLehose was to launch Open Borders Press, as the first imprint of Orenda Books.

== Early life ==
Christopher MacLehose was born in Edinburgh, Scotland, on 12 July 1940 to Alexander MacLehose and Elizabeth Hope MacLehose (née Bushell). His family was involved with the book trade as printers, booksellers and publishers, and he has described them as "seven generations, all of them second sons". He was educated at Shrewsbury School (1953–58), and read history at Worcester College, Oxford University.

== Career ==
MacLehose took a job at the Glasgow Herald, where he hoped to stay for six months to gain the experience that would enable him to work for the recently founded Independent Television News; however, his ambitions changed direction after a few weeks: "I realised ... I wanted to work with language and words," MacLehose said in a 2012 interview. So he worked in the editorial office of the family printing factory by day, while freelancing by night for The Herald writing reviews and obituaries. Eventually, he was offered employment as literary editor of The Scotsman, following which he moved in 1967 to London and went into book publishing, initially as an editor at the Cresset Press (part of the Barrie Group), with P. G. Wodehouse among his authors, as well as George MacDonald Fraser of Flashman fame, who had been the features editor of the Glasgow Herald when MacLehose was there. MacLehose subsequently became editorial director of Chatto & Windus, and then editor-in-chief of William Collins.

In 1984, MacLehose took charge of the Harvill imprint, of which he was publisher for the next 20 years, with a well respected list that specialised in translated works and included such titles as Boris Pasternak's Dr Zhivago, Giuseppe Tomasi di Lampedusa's The Leopard, Mikhail Bulgakov's The Master and Margarita, Aleksandr Solzhenitsyn's One Day in the Life of Ivan Denisovich, and Peter Høeg's Miss Smilla's Feeling for Snow. Under his leadership, between 1998 and 2005, Harvill Press published a numbered series of books, known as the Leopard Series due to the series emblem (the initial series ran up to number 310 and was revived in 2020). In 1995, MacLehose led a management buy-out of Harvill and for the following seven years characterised the company as "a bridge across cultures", counting among his authors Richard Ford, Raymond Carver, W. G. Sebald, José Saramago, Georges Perec, Claudio Magris and P. O. Enquist. In 2002, the company was bought by Random House and two years later MacLehose left.

He then set up the MacLehose Press, whose motto is "Read the World", as "an independently minded imprint" of Quercus Books (itself founded in 2004). The first titles were published in January 2008, and among these was the best-selling psychological thriller The Girl with the Dragon Tattoo by Swedish author Stieg Larsson. Other international authors published by MacLehose Press include Bernardo Atxaga, Dulce Maria Cardoso, Philippe Claudel, Otto de Kat, Maylis de Kerangal, Virginie Despentes, Joël Dicker, Sophie Divry, Per Olov Enquist, Roy Jacobsen, Jaan Kross, Andrey Kurkov, David Lagercrantz, Pierre Lemaitre, Élmer Mendoza, Patrick Modiano, Marie NDiaye, Daniel Pennac, Lydie Salvayre, Żanna Słoniowska, and Valerio Varesi. On 30 October 2020, MacLehose Press announced that MacLehose had chosen to leave the imprint. Associate publisher Katharina Bielenberg took over as publisher.

In March 2021, it was announced that MacLehose would be leading a new imprint at the Welbeck Publishing Group called Mountain Leopard Press, with a focus on literary work and translated literature, the launch title being Evelio Rosero's Stranger to the Moon, translated by Victor Meadowcroft and Anne McLean. In December 2022 the Mountain Leopard list was sold by Welback to Hachette.

In January 2024, it was announced that MacLehose would be launching Open Borders Press, the first imprint of Orenda Books, with Andrey Kurkov's Our Daily War as the imprint's first title.

With "a reputation as a master at finding foreign fiction by writers such as Henning Mankell and Haruki Murakami and turning them into English language hits", MacLehose has said: "When I first came into publishing, there was André Deutsch, Fredric Warburg, Ernest Hecht, Manya Harari, George Weidenfeld – a generation of multilingual people who came to England bringing the assumption that books that had to be translated were no different.... You simply published the best you could find and if you had to translate them, you just got on with it."

== Awards and honours ==
In 2006, MacLehose received the London Book Fair Lifetime Achievement Award for International Publishing.

He was appointed a Commander of the Order of the British Empire (CBE) for services to the publishing industry in the 2011 New Year Honours.

In 2016, MacLehose was awarded the Benson Medal by the Royal Society of Literature (RSL). He was elected an honorary Fellow of the RSL in 2021.

MacLehose received Estonia's Order of the Cross of Terra Mariana, IV Class, in 2023.
