= Clarges Street =

Street in the City of Westminster, London

Coordinates: 51.5066°N 0.1448°W

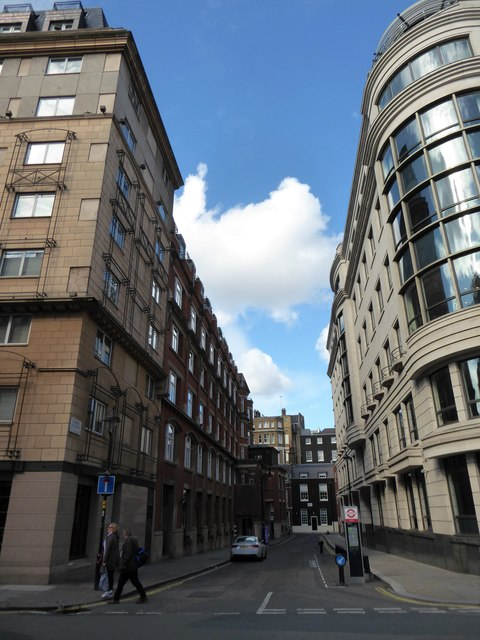
Clarges Street from Piccadilly

Clarges Street is a street in the City of Westminster, London. The street runs from Clarges Mews in the north to Piccadilly in the south. It is crossed by Curzon Street.

== History ==
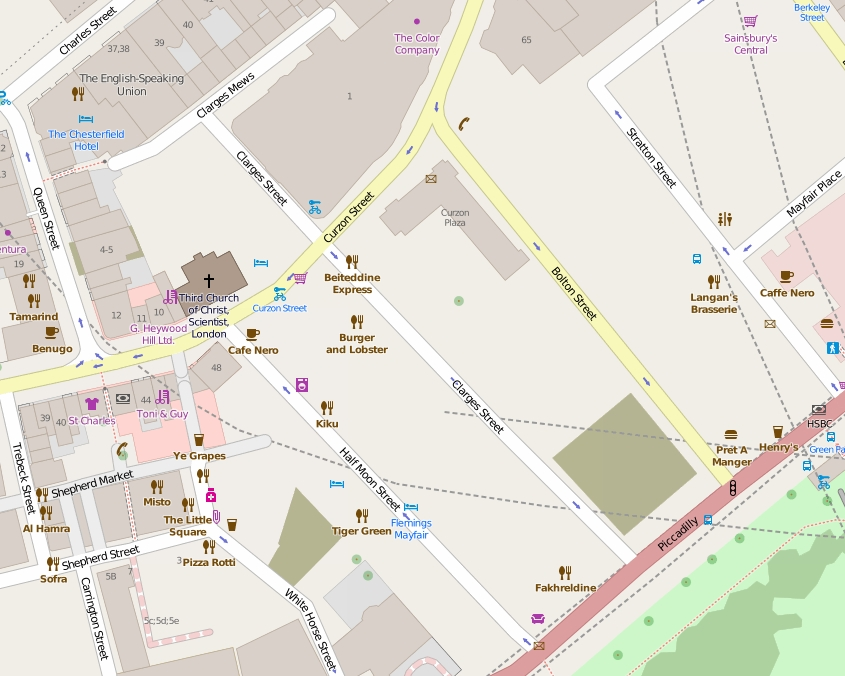
The immediate vicinity of Clarges Street

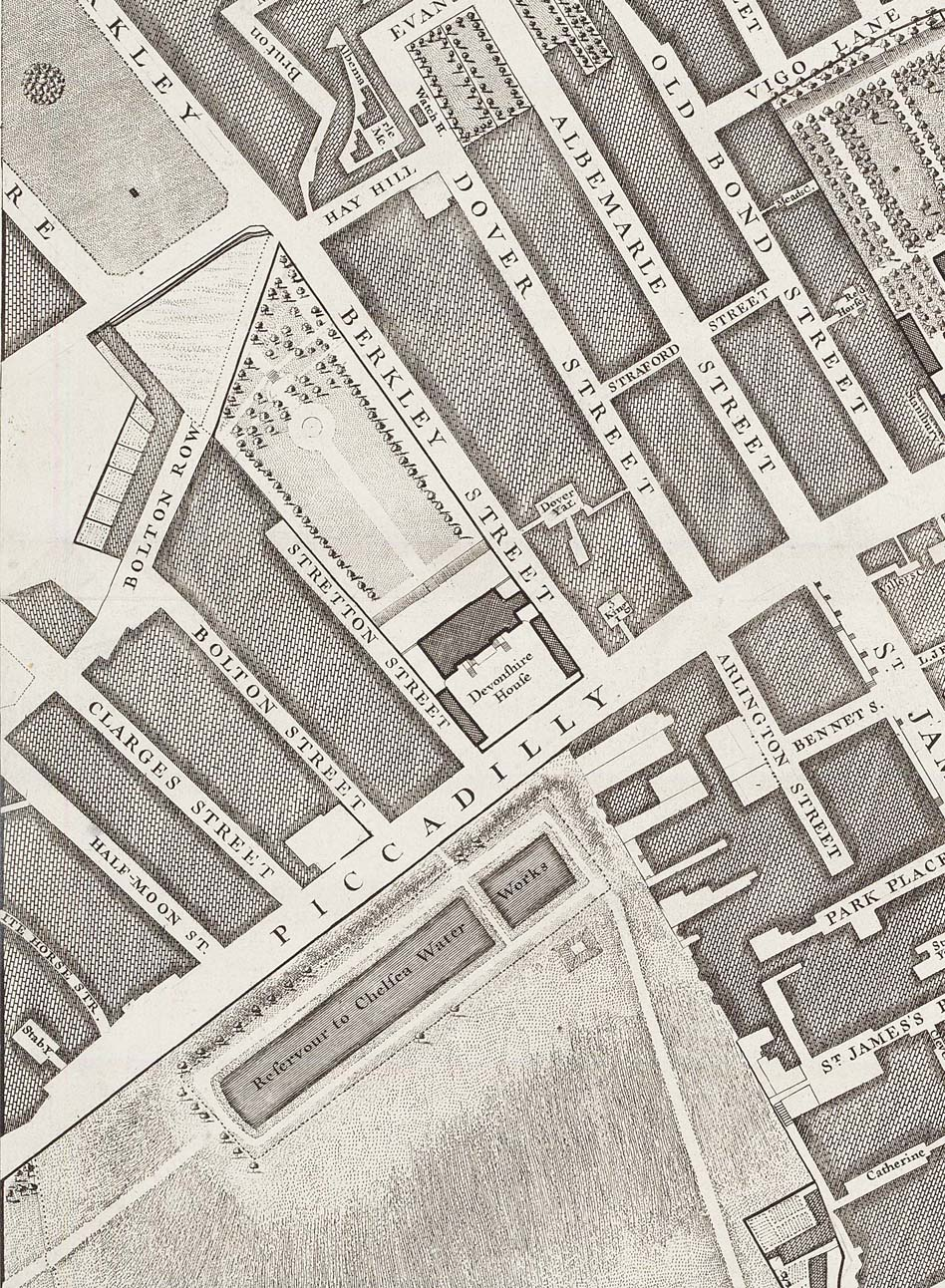
Clarges Street on John Rocque's 1746 map of London

Clarges Street was built in the early 18th century and is probably named after Sir Thomas Clarges.

== Notable inhabitants ==
Notable inhabitants of Clarges Street have included Lady Hamilton, Edmund Kean, Thomas Babington Macaulay, Charles James Fox and racing driver D'Arcy Baker.

== Buildings ==
Clarges Street is mostly made up of Georgian town houses and modern office buildings. The headquarters of The Kennel Club is at numbers 1–5.
