= Kenneth Newton =

English doctor

- Born: William Kenneth Newton; 6 November 1927; London, England
- Died: 6 March 2010 (aged 82)
- Education: Charterhouse School
- Alma mater: Westminster Hospital Medical School
- Occupations: Medical doctor and novelist
- Known for: The Two Pound Tram
- Parent: Frank Newton
- Relatives: Peter Newton (brother); Nigel Newton (nephew)

William Kenneth Newton (6 November 1927 – 6 March 2010) was an English doctor who treated British and foreign royalty as well as many celebrities, and after retirement wrote the acclaimed novel The Two Pound Tram (under the name William Newton) which won the 2005 Society of Authors Sagittarius Prize (for first novelists over the age of 60).

== Early life ==
He was born in Ealing, west London the son of racing driver Frank Newton (who won the Montagu Cup in 1908 at Brooklands). He and his brother Peter were educated at Charterhouse School, Peter went on to be a pioneer of California's Napa Valley wine industry. Kenneth went on to study medicine at King's College Hospital in London and then at Westminster Hospital Medical School before volunteering to serve as a medical officer in North Africa and Cyprus with the Grenadier Guards.

== Medical practice ==
After working with Sir Francis Leslie, in 1960 he set up his own practice at 60 Cadogan Square in Knightsbridge which he expanded to offer consultation, radiology, pathology and a dispensary; among his patients was Princess Alice, Duchess of Gloucester.

In 1986 he moved to 79 Harley Street where his patients included Audrey Hepburn, Deborah Kerr and Dame Margot Fonteyn and members of the Bahrain Royal family until his formal retirement in 1998, although he continued treating patients on a part-time basis until 2003. He retired to Fawley Manor in Berkshire which he bought in 1983 and completely renovated.

== Writing ==
In 2003 he wrote his prize-winning first novel The Two Pound Tram. He gave the manuscript to his nephew Nigel Newton – founder of Bloomsbury Publishing who, not wanting to get involved, passed it to on to his editorial staff. It was published in 2003 to great acclaim.

His second novel The Mistress of Abha was published posthumously in 2011.

== Death ==
He died at home on 6 March 2010 and is survived by his son and daughter and second wife, Mary whom he married in 1985.

== Sources ==
- Obituary from The Telegraph 22 April 2010
