= Barbara Hardy (literary scholar) =

Welsh literary scholar, author, poet

Professor Barbara Hardy FRSL FBA
- Born: Barbara Nathan; 27 June 1924; Swansea, Wales
- Died: 12 February 2016 (aged 91)

Academic background
- Education: University College London

Academic work
- Discipline: English literature
- Sub-discipline: Literature of the 19th century George Eliot; Jane Austen; Charles Dickens; Thomas Hardy
- Institutions: Royal Holloway, University of London; Birkbeck College, University of London

Barbara Gladys Hardy, FRSL, FBA (née Nathan; 27 June 1924 – 12 February 2016) was a British literary scholar, author, and poet. As an academic, she specialised in the literature of the 19th Century. From 1965 to 1970, she was Professor of English at Royal Holloway College, University of London. Then, from 1970 to 1989, she was Professor of English Literature at Birkbeck College, University of London.

== Early life and education ==
Hardy was born on 27 June 1924 in Swansea, Wales. Her father was Maurice Nathan, a tobacconist, and her mother was Gladys Emily Ann, née Abraham.

She was educated at Swansea High School for Girls, a grammar school. In February 1941, she experienced the Swansea Blitz. She studied at University College London, graduating with a Bachelor of Arts (BA) degree in 1947 and a Master of Arts (MA) degree in 1949.

On 16 March 1946, she married Ernest Dawson Hardy, a civil servant at the Inland Revenue. They had two children, Kate and Julia.

== Honours ==
In 1962, Hardy was awarded the Rose Mary Crawshay Prize by the British Academy for her monograph The Novels of George Eliot. In 1988 she delivered the British Academy's Sarah Tryphena Phillips Lecture in American Literature and History. In 1997, she was awarded the Sagittarius Prize by the Society of Authors for her novel London Lovers. She was elected a Fellow of the Royal Society of Literature (FRSL) in 1997, and a Senior Fellow of the British Academy (FBA) in 2006.

== Selected works ==
Academic

- Hardy, Barbara (1959). The novels of George Eliot: a study in form. London: Athlone Press.
- Hardy, Barbara (1975). A reading of Jane Austen. London: Peter Owen Publishers. ISBN 978-0720601343.
- Hardy, Barbara (1985). The moral art of Dickens: essays. London: Athlone Press. ISBN 978-0485112740.
- Hardy, Barbara (2000). Thomas Hardy: imagining imagination in Hardy's poetry and fiction. London: Athlone Press. ISBN 978-0485121537.
- Hardy, Barbara (2006). George Eliot: a critic's biography. London: Continuum. ISBN 978-0826485151.

Personal

- Hardy, Barbara (1994). Swansea girl: a memoir. London: Peter Owen Publishers. ISBN 978-0720609042.
- Hardy, Barbara (1996). London lovers. London: Peter Owen Publishers. ISBN 978-0720609646.

Poetry

- Dante's Ghosts (Paekakariki Press, 2013)
