= Public lending right =

Intellectual property program

A public lending right (PLR) is a program intended to either compensate authors for the potential loss of sales from their works being available in public libraries or as a governmental support of the arts, through support of works available in public libraries, such as books, music and artwork.

Thirty-five countries have a PLR program, and others are considering adopting one. Canada, the United Kingdom, Ireland, all the Scandinavian countries, Germany, Austria, Belgium, the Netherlands, Israel, Australia, Malta and New Zealand currently have PLR programmes. There is ongoing debate in France about implementing one. There is also a move towards having a Europe-wide PLR programme administered by the European Union.

In the United States the Authors Guild began a campaign in support of the PLR in 2018.

The first PLR programme was initiated in Denmark in 1941. However, it was not properly implemented until 1946 due to World War II. The idea spread slowly from country to country and many nations' PLR programs are quite recent developments.

== National variations ==
PLR programmes vary from country to country. Some, like Germany and the Netherlands, have linked PLR to copyright legislation and have made libraries liable to pay authors for every book in their collection. Other countries do not connect PLR to copyright.

In Denmark, the current programme is considered a type of governmental support of the arts, not reimbursement of potential lost sales. Types of works supported are books, music, and visual artworks, created and published in Denmark, and available in public and school libraries.

In the UK, authors Brigid Brophy and Maureen Duffy spearheaded a campaign to achieve a public lending right, following on from John Brophy's original notion in the 1950s of 'The Brophy Penny'. The UK PLR scheme was established with thePublic Lending Right Act 1979 which was further expanded in 1982. It was incorporated into the British Library in 2013. The scheme was administered from 1991 to 2014 by Registrar James Parker.

=== Payments ===
How amounts of payment are determined also varies from country to country. For example, in the UK, pay is based on how many times a book has been taken out of a library, while in Canada, the system of payment is based on whether a library owns a book or not.

The amount of payments is also variable. The amount any one author can receive is never very considerable. In the United Kingdom authors are paid on a per-loan basis calculated from a representative sample of libraries. The rate in 2019 was 8.52 pence per individual loan. In Canada, annual payment is based on the following equation:

Payment per title = Hit Rate (C$63.97 for 2021–21) × # libraries where title is found × % share × time adjusted,

where the number of libraries is counted from a national sample (number of copies in each library is irrelevant); share is the percentage contribution to the work (e.g. for books with co-authors, illustrators, translators, or narrators); and the time adjustment is 100% for the first 5 years, decreasing to 50% after 16 years, and is 0% after 25 years. The formula is applied to each title registered by the contributor. As of 2024, there is a maximum of C$4,500 that any one person can receive in a year.

=== Eligibility criteria ===
Different countries also have differing eligibility criteria. In most nations only published works are accepted, government publications are rarely counted, nor are bibliographies or dictionaries. Some PLR services are mandated solely to fund literary works of fiction, and some such as Norway, have a sliding scale paying far less to non-fiction works. Many nations also exclude scholarly and academic texts.

== EU directive ==
Within the European Union, the public lending right is regulated since November 1992 by directive 92/100/EEC on rental right and lending right. A report in 2002 from the European Commission pointed out that many member countries had failed to implement this directive correctly.

The PLR directive has met with resistance from the side of the International Federation of Library Associations and Institutions (IFLA). The IFLA has stated that the principles of 'lending right' can jeopardize free access to the services of publicly accessible libraries, which is the citizen's human right. The PLR directive and its implementation in public libraries is rejected by a number of European authors, including Nobel Laureates Dario Fo and José Saramago.
