= D'Arcy Baker =

D'Arcy Richard Baker (1877–1932) was a British businessman and racing driver.

Baker was the managing director of Fiat in the UK.

In the early 1900s, he extensively renovated Hedsor House, a mansion he owned in Hedsor, Buckinghamshire. However, the expense led to his bankruptcy, and upon his death, his estate passed to his bankers, and then to the Shepherd family in 1934.

In 1908, at Brooklands, Frank Newton drove a 90hp Napier motor car for its Australian owner Selwyn Edge, who had a £500 bet with Baker that his car could go faster than Felice Nazzaro's Fiat. Unfortunately, the Napier suffered from mechanical trouble.

In 1911, at the age of 33, he was living at 18 Clarges Street, Mayfair, single, with two servants, and had one visitor, a Royal Navy officer, Oscar Valentin de Satge, the son of Oscar de Satge.

He died in 1932 in the Wycombe district of Buckinghamshire, and his obituary was published on 15 March 1932 in the Gloucestershire Echo.
