= Sandra Agard =

British storyteller, writer, literary consultant and cultural historian

Sandra A. Agard FRSL
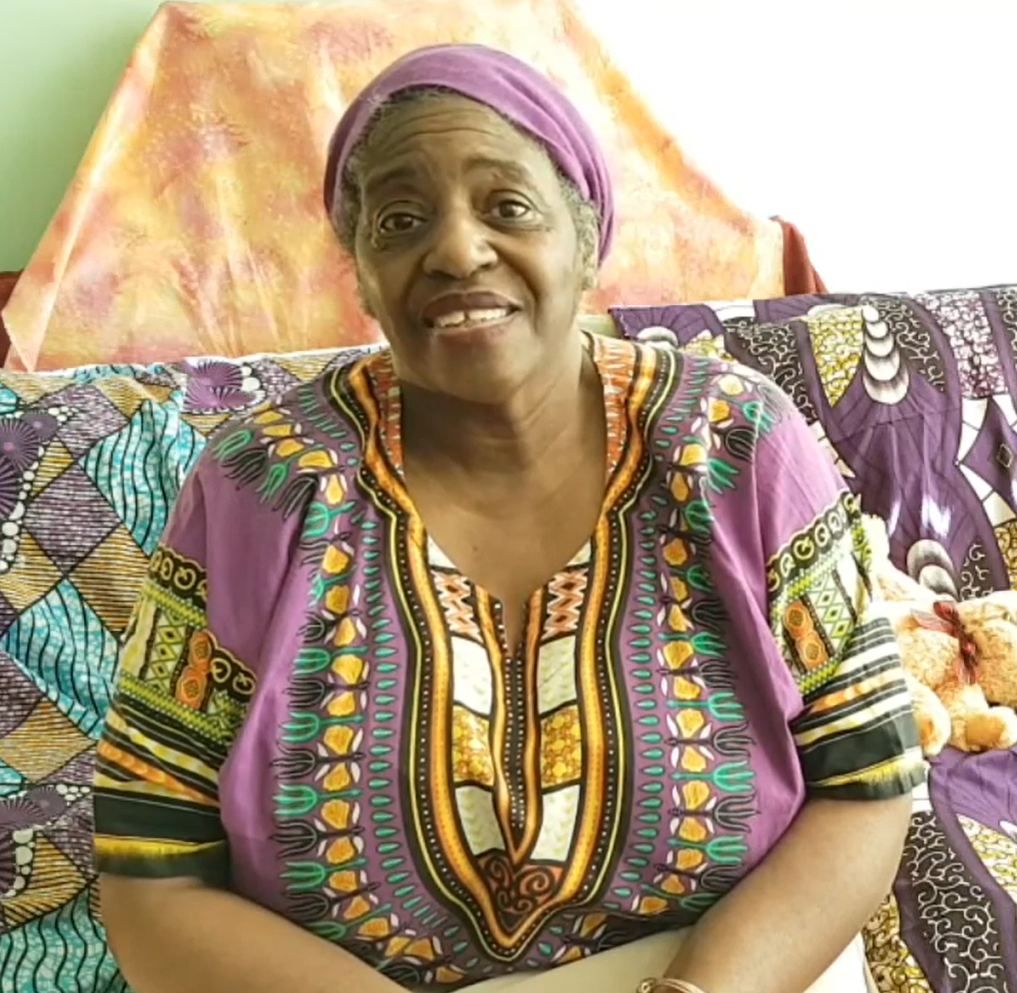
- Agard in 2020
- Born: Hackney, London, England
- Occupations: Storyteller, writer, literary consultant and cultural historian
- Writing career
- Genres: Children's literature; poetry; drama
- Subject: Black British history
- Notable awards: Benson Medal (2022)

Sandra Agard Hon. FRSL is a British storyteller, writer, literary consultant and cultural historian. She is a published author of short stories and poetry, and for more than 40 years has performed her work, including plays, within the UK as well as internationally. She has worked in libraries as a literature development officer, as well as in art galleries and with community groups in many other settings. In 2022, she was elected an Honorary Fellow of the Royal Society of Literature (RSL) and was the recipient of the RSL's Benson Medal.

== Biography ==
Sandra A. Agard was born in Hackney, London, to Guyanese parents who had travelled to the UK in the early 1950s.

In a career spanning 40 years, she has been a professional storyteller, author, tutor, playwright, literary consultant, editor and cultural historian, working in educational, cultural institutions, organisations and literary festivals throughout the UK and internationally, including in the United States. Her plays have been performed at such venues as the Royal Court Young People's Theatre, the Polka Theatre, the Lyric Hammersmith and The Drill Hall in London. Publications where her short stories have appeared include Tales, Myths and Legends, Time for Telling and in Malorie Blackman's anthology Unheard Voices.

Her storytelling is characteristically "steeped in African Caribbean oral traditions", and she is best known for her popular interactive stories with children, through which she encourages them to become involved, explaining the inspiration behind the stories. Her recently published work includes the 2019 children's book Harriet Tubman: A Journey to Freedom.

Agard was Centenary Storyteller in Resident at the Roald Dahl Museum and Story Centre, and her other previous employment includes various engagements with organisations such as Southwark and Lewisham Libraries in south-east London, and the Ministry of Stories. She is currently a Learning Facilitator for Schools at The British Library.

In 2022, Agard was elected as an Honorary Fellow of the Royal Society of Literature (RSL). She was also awarded the RSL's Benson Medal, which honours a whole career of service to literature.

== Bibliography ==
- Trailblazers: Harriet Tubman, Stripes Publishing, 2019, ISBN 978-1788952224
- Where We Find Ourselves: Poems and Stories of Maps and Mapping from UK based Writers of the Global Majority (co-edited with Laila Sumpton), 2021, Arachne Press, ISBN 978-1913665449
- The Bristol Bus Boycott: A fight for racial justice, HarperCollins, 2022, ISBN 978-0008424572
- Amazing Women in Black History, Hachette Learning, 2022, ISBN 978-1398324206
- The Drum Maker and the Aziza, HarperCollins, 2023, ISBN 978-0008541750
