= Sagittarius Prize =

- Description: Literary award for a first novel by an author over the age of sixty
- Country: United Kingdom
- Presented by: Society of Authors

The Sagittarius Prize was a literary award given between 1991 and 2005 by the Society of Authors for a first novel by an author over the age of sixty. Initially the prize was worth £2,000 but was increased to £4,000 in 2003.

== Past winners ==
- 1991 - Judith Hubback, The Sea Has Many Voices
- 1992 - Hugh Leonard, Parnell And The English Woman
- 1993 - Brian O'Doherty, The Strange Case Of Mademoiselle P.
- 1994 - George Hummer, Red Branch
- 1995 - Fred Plisner, Gravity Is Getting Me Down
- 1996 - Samuel Lock, As Luck Would Have It
- 1997 - Barbara Hardy, London Lovers
- 1998 - A. Sivanandan, When Memory Dies
- 1999 - Ingrid Mann, The Danube Testament
- 2000 - David Crackanthorpe, Stolen Marches
- 2001 - Michael Richardson, The Pig Bin
- 2002 - Zvi Jagendorf, Wolfy And The Strudelbakers
- 2003 - Margaret Kaine, Ring Of Clay
- 2004 - William Newton, The Two Pound Tram
- 2005 - Lauro Martines, Loredana
