= Fantesca Estate & Winery =

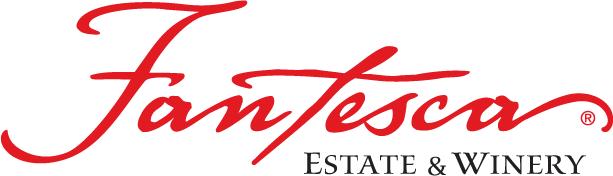

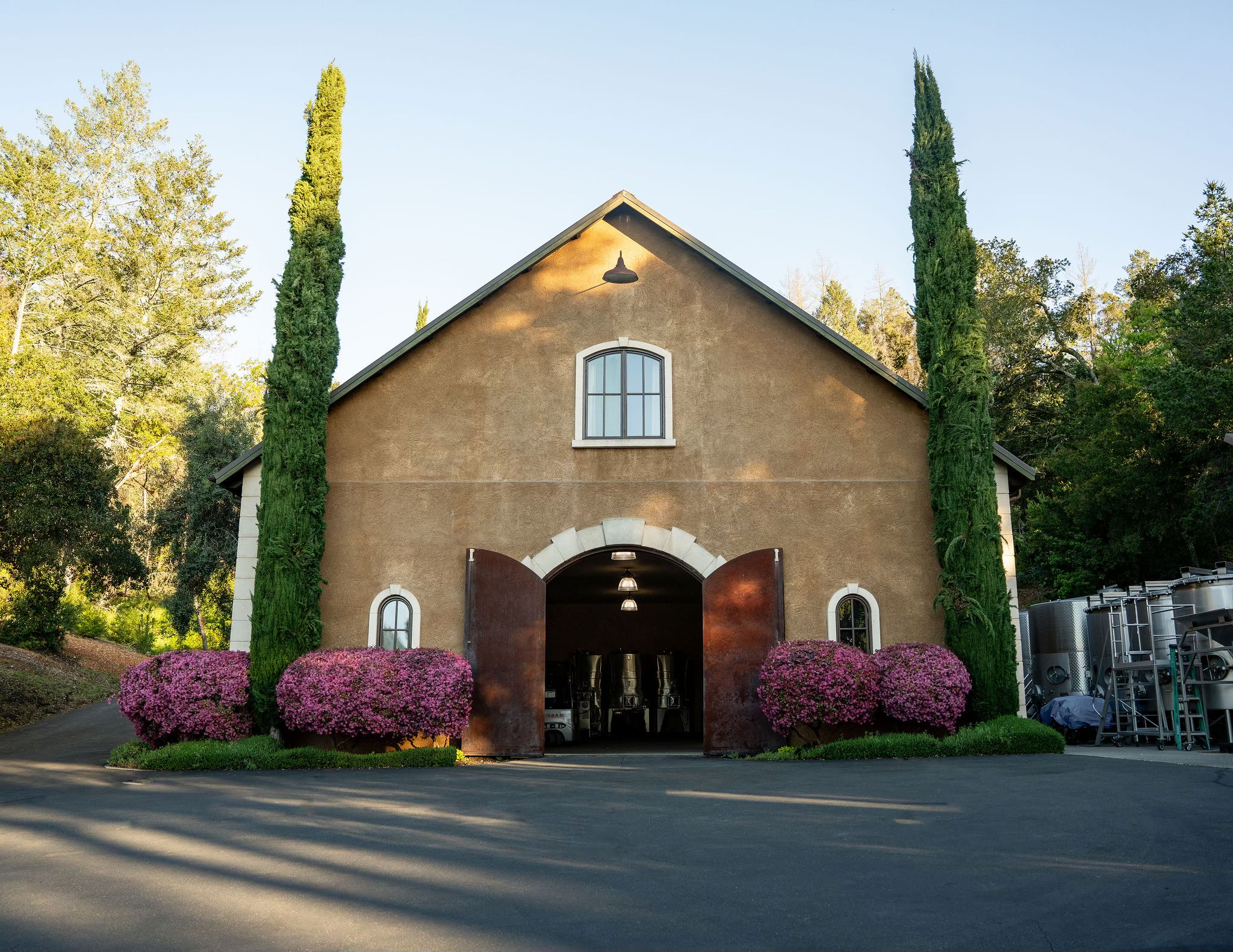
- Location: St. Helena, California, USA
- Appellation: Spring Mountain AVA
- Founded: 2003
- Key people: Susan Schulze Hoff (co-founder); Duane Hoff (co-founder); DLynn Proctor (director)
- Cases/yr: 4,500
- Tasting: By Appointment Only
- Website: fantesca.com

Fantesca Estate & Winery is a family-owned boutique winery in the Spring Mountain District AVA of Napa Valley. The proprietors – Susan Schulze Hoff and Duane Hoff – are former executives of Best Buy Company. Since April 2008, Heidi Barrett has been the estate's winemaker.

== History ==
Fantesca's property was originally the dowry of Caroline Bale, when she married Charles Krug in 1860. Even then, it was recognized as prime mountain vineyard land. A Cabernet Sauvignon from this vineyard made by Hannah Weinberger won one of the first awards for a wine from the Napa Valley in 1889.

Susan Schulze Hoff is the daughter of Best Buy Chairman and Founder Richard Schulze. She began working in the family business at the age of 18 and, after 23 years, retired from the post of Senior Vice President and Chief Communications Officer in 2006. Duane Hoff began as a department manager at Best Buy and held the post of Business Development before his retirement. In February 2004, the Hoffs purchased the estate and cave, which had been developed by Robert Yeakey. At the time of purchase there was an inventory of 2002 vintage wine in barrel, which the Hoffs hastily finished and branded for a 2005 release.

In 2018, Sommelier DLynn Proctor, who is known for an American documentary film SOMM: Into the Bottle was appointed as director at Fantesca Estate.

=== Name Origins ===
The Fantesca name comes from the female character La Fantesca (who was part of an Italian comedy group, in theater performances of Commedia dell'arte). She was both the lover and equal companion of the character Harlequin and could always be counted on to charm her audiences.

== Grape Varieties ==
From a 53-acre (21 ha) property, the 8.6-acre (3.5 ha) vineyard is cultivated with Cabernet Sauvignon, Petit Verdot and Cabernet Franc.

== Mardi Gras ==
Susan and Duane Hoff have taken part in and been celebrating Mardi Gras since 2001, with the Krewe of Mid-City- originally at the encouragement of friends. In 2017, just in time for the Hoff's 29th wedding anniversary, they were named Queen and King of the Krewe of Mid-City.
