= Smith-Madrone Vineyards and Winery =

Winery in Napa Valley, California

- Location: California, United States
- Wine region: Wine Country
- Appellation: Napa Valley
- Founded: 1971
- First vintage: 1977
- Cases/yr: less than 5,000
- Varietals: Cabernet Sauvignon, Chardonnay, Riesling, Cook's Flat Reserve, Rosé, Cabernet Franc

Smith-Madrone Vineyards and Winery is a winery in Napa Valley in the Spring Mountain District AVA. It was founded in 1971 by Stuart Smith. The name Smith-Madrone comes from combining the founders' name with the madrone trees among the estate. The winery is a long-time pioneer of dry farming.

Charles Smith, Stuart Smith's brother, is the winemaker at Smith-Madrone. Charles joined the winery in 1973. • François Bugué, is the Associate Winemaker.

== Vineyards ==
Smith-Madrone is located in the Spring Mountain District in the Napa Valley AVA. The estate is a 200-acre (81 ha) ranch, planted partly as vineyards over a century ago. It sits at 1,600 to 1,800 ft (550 m) elevation at the top of Spring Mountain amid fir and madrona. Some of the vines are planted on slopes angling over 30 degrees. There are 6.25 acres (2.53 ha) of Riesling, 10.25 acres (4.15 ha) of Chardonnay, 13 acres (5.3 ha) of Cabernet Sauvignon, 1-acre (0.40 ha) of Cabernet Franc and 3.75 acres (1.52 ha) of Merlot.

== Wines ==
Smith-Madrone's current varietals are Cabernet Sauvignon, Chardonnay, Riesling and Cook's Flat Reserve. Production of the first vintage was in 1977. There are less than 5,000 cases released each year.

Smith-Madrone is most known for its benchmark Riesling, "one of the most coveted California Rieslings", and was voted "The Best Riesling in the World" by the Gault-Millau International Wine Championships in Europe in 1979. Smith-Madrone’s Riesling is the only Riesling from North America in Stuart Pigott’s list of Top 20 Dry Rieslings in his book The Riesling Story: Best White Wine on Earth. Pigott explains: “…some of my favorite Californian Rieslings, like that from Smith-Madrone…come from dramatic mountainous locations….[this is] a properly dry Riesling that has arguably been the most consistent wine from this grape in the entire state since the first vintage back in 1977"
