= James Gordon Parker =

British authors' rights advocate (1952–2026)

James Gordon Parker OBE
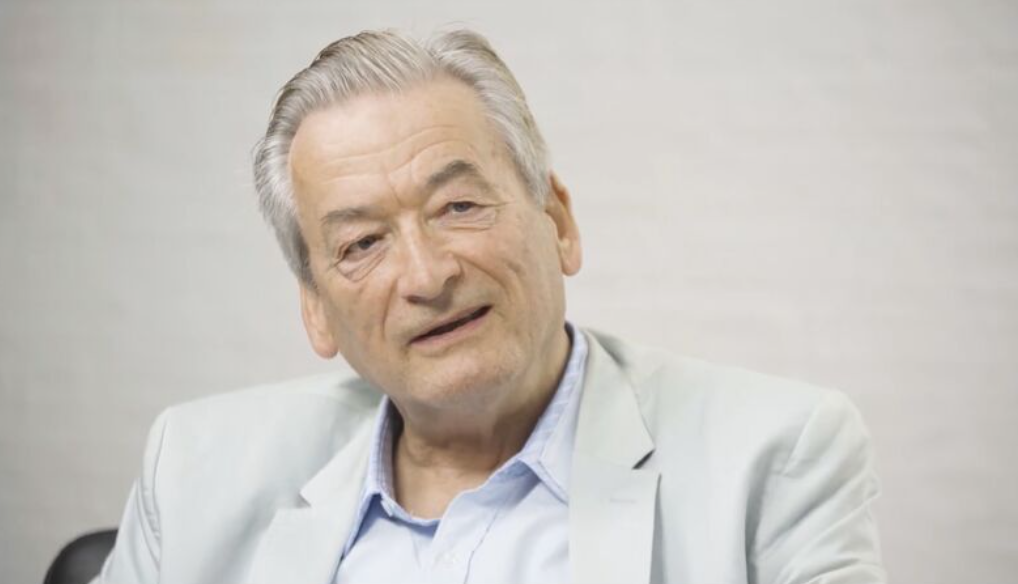
- Parker in an ALCS video interview
- Born: 1 June 1952
- Died: 22 January 2026 (aged 73)
- Citizenship: British
- Occupations: Public registrar, author
- Years active: 1991–2014
- Known for: International advocacy for authors' rights
- Title: Registrar of Public Lending Right

James Gordon Parker (1 June 1952 – 22 January 2026) was a British public official, author and advocate for authors' rights. He was often known as Jim Parker.

He served as registrar of the United Kingdom's Public Lending Right (PLR) programme from 1991 to 2014 and in 1995 he founded the PLR International Network (PLRI). His work ensured that authors were paid royalties when their books were borrowed from public libraries.

== Education and early career ==
Parker completed a PhD at the University of Edinburgh in 1977. His thesis, Directors of the East India Company, 1754–1790, examines the East India Company's evolution from a trading company to a political power in India.

He later worked at the Royal Commission on Historical Manuscripts and published a number of historical and bibliographical works, including a contribution to The Scots Abroad: Labour, Capital, Enterprise, 1750–1914 (1985) and as author of Lord Curzon, 1859–1925: A Bibliography (1991).

== Registrar of Public Lending Right (1991–2014) ==
In 1991, Parker was appointed Registrar of the United Kingdom's Public Lending Right - the statutory scheme that compensates authors when their books are borrowed from public libraries.

During his tenure, he helped raise the profile of PLR among authors, libraries and policymakers. He also oversaw the modernisation of the PLR system to ensure that authors received compensation from audiobook and e-book downloads.

To mark the twentieth anniversary of Public Lending Right, Parker published Whose Loan Is It Anyway? (1999) - a collection of essays by politicians, authors and publishing figures.

== PLR International ==
In 1995, Parker founded the Public Lending Right network (PLRI) to promote the adoption of public lending right systems internationally. He acted as the organiser's co-ordinator.

At a 2002 conference in Glasgow, he raised the question of how Public Lending Right systems might operate in an increasingly digital environment, stating: "We must begin to think about the possible role of PLR in the digital age. Will there be a role for lending right systems in an age of increasing electronic exchange of information?"

== Publications ==
Parker's published works include:

- The Scots Abroad: Labour, Capital, Enterprise, 1750–1914 (1985)
- Lord Curzon, 1859–1925: A Bibliography (1991)
- Whose Loan Is It Anyway? (1999)
- Parker, Jim. "PLR in a Copyright Context." IFLA Journal 23, no. 4 (1997): 299–304.
- Parker, Jim. "The Public Lending Right and What It Does." WIPO Magazine (2018).

== Honours ==
In 2002, Parker was appointed an Officer of the Order of the British Empire (OBE) for services to Public Lending Right.

In 2004, he received the Benson Medal from the Royal Society of Literature, jointly with Maureen Duffy.

== Death and legacy ==
Parker died on 22 January 2026 in Yarm, North Yorkshire. He was 73 years old. He is survived by his wife Ann and two children.

Tributes published by the British Library, ALCS, IFRRO and PLR International describe Dr Parker as a central figure in the development of the public lending right system in the UK.

His efforts helped expand compensation systems for writers internationally. After he established the PLR International Network (PLRI), the number of countries operating Public Lending Right (PLR) programmes increased significantly.
