= Stony Hill Vineyard =

Coordinates: 38.535651°N 122.530046°W

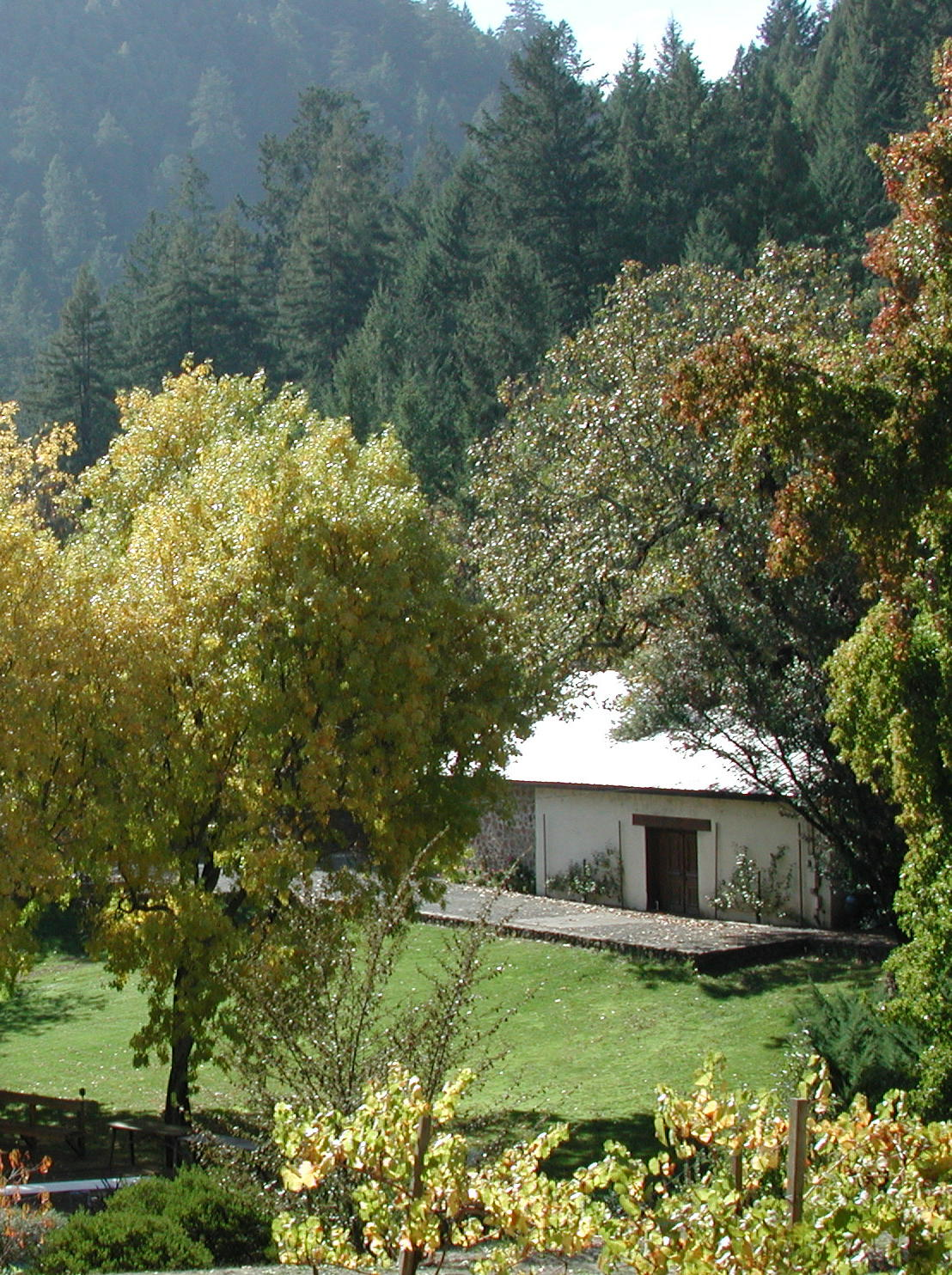
- Former winery building
- Type: Private company
- Industry: Wine
- Founded: 1952
- Founder: Fred and Eleanor McCrea
- Headquarters: St. Helena, California, United States
- Key people: Winemaker: Reid Griggs
- Parent: Lawrence Wine Estates
- Website: www.stonyhillvineyard.com

Stony Hill Vineyard is a Napa Valley winery in Saint Helena, California, USA, within the Spring Mountain District AVA. Unusually for Napa Valley, it formerly produced almost exclusively white wine, chiefly Chardonnay. The winery was founded in 1952 and was family-owned until 2018; it is now part of Lawrence Wine Estates, owned by Gaylon Lawrence Jr. and master sommelier Carlton McCoy Jr.

== Winery ==
Stony Hill occupies 160-acre (65 ha) of land north of St. Helena, California, cultivating grapes on approximately 42 acres, from 400 feet (120 m) to 1,500 feet (460 m) in elevation, facing north and east on the side of Spring Mountain. It is part of the Spring Mountain District AVA. Since 2019, the vineyard has been a California Certified Organic Farmer; it also holds Demeter International certification. Until the 2020s it was unusual among Napa Valley wineries in producing almost entirely white wine: primarily Chardonnay but also Riesling and Gewürztraminer. As of 2018, annual wine production was approximately 5,000 cases. In addition to red wine for family consumption from a small plot referred to as "Fred's Reds", Syrah was planted in the 1990s and since 2009, Stony Mountain has produced some Cabernet Sauvignon; the red wine grapes were crushed elsewhere.

The winery uses decades-old neutral oak barrels, historically avoided malolactic fermentation, and produces more acidic and less alcoholic Chardonnays than those popularized in the revival of the grape in the 1990s. It sells mainly to restaurants and by mail-order subscription; it was the first Napa Valley winery to implement mail orders. From 1972 to 2018, it produced a dessert wine from Sémillon grapes, Sémillon de Soleil, sold exclusively through the Corti Brothers wine shop in Sacramento.

== History ==
In 1943, San Francisco advertising executive Fred McCrea and his wife Eleanor bought the land, formerly a goat ranch, as a vacation property. In 1947 they planted it with 8 acres of Riesling, 5 acres of Pinot blanc, and 6 acres of Chardonnay sourced from the Wente family in the Livermore Valley, with which they hoped to emulate the white wines of Burgundy. The Pinot blanc vines were later removed and Gewürztraminer added. Some Riesling vines planted in 1948 are still under cultivation, possibly the oldest Riesling vines in production in North America. The original wooden winery building was erected in 1951; Fred McCrea carved bunches of grapes on the doors. The first Chardonnay vintage was harvested in 1952 and the first 50 cases were sold in 1954. Wine tastings were held on the front porch of the house the McCreas built, also in 1951, to replace the original 1890s farmhouse.

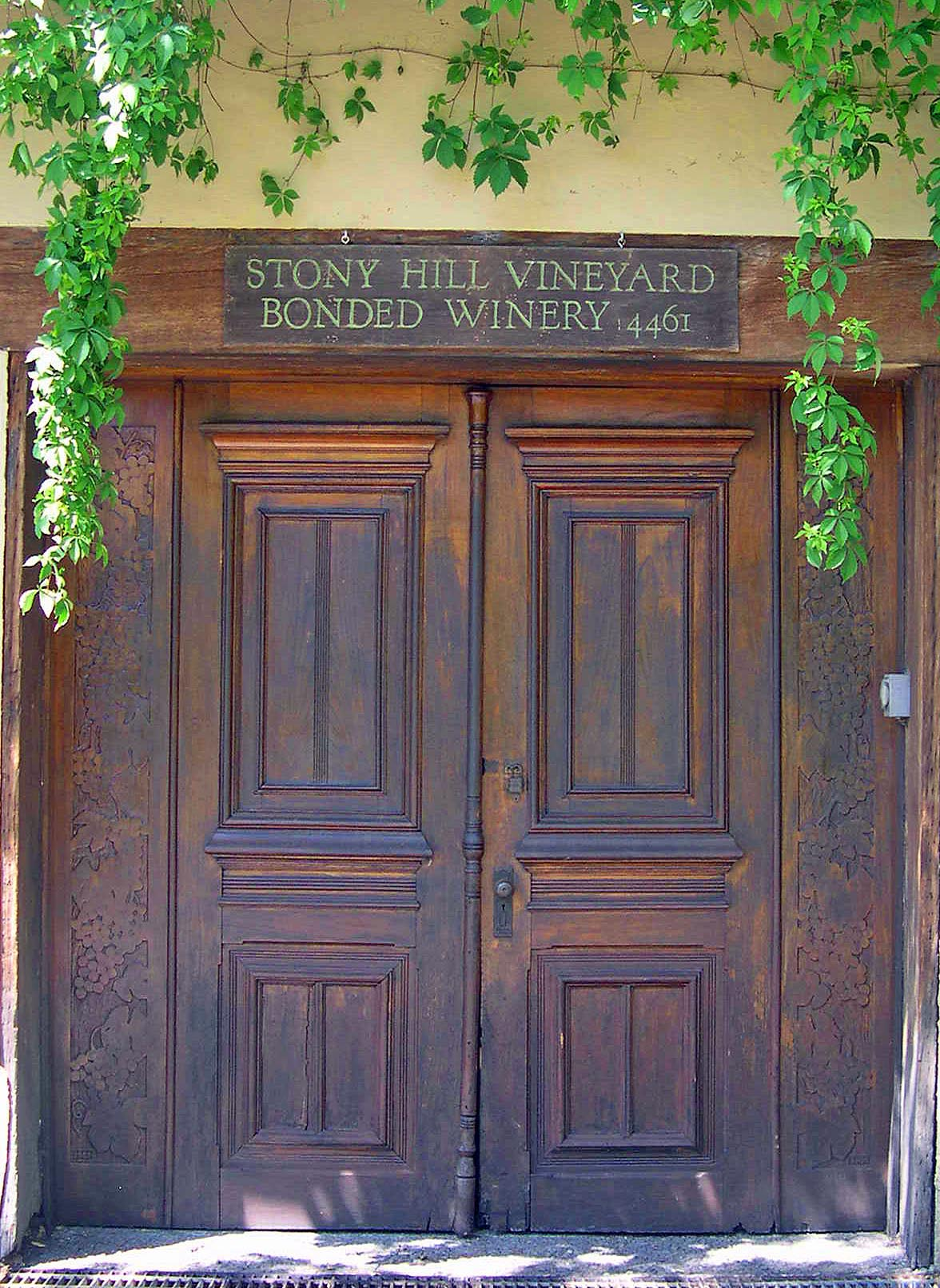
Winery doors from 1951

Fred McCrea died in 1977. After Eleanor McCrea died in 1991, Stony Hill passed to their son Peter McCrea and his wife Willinda; their daughter Sarah McCrea later became company president. A second wine production room was built in stone in the 1980s. Fred McCrea was the first winemaker; Mike Chelini was winemaker from 1973 to 2019.

In August 2018, Stony Hill Vineyard announced its acquisition by Long Meadow Ranch, a larger but also family-owned Napa Valley winery, with the McCrea family retaining an equity stake, Sarah McCrea becoming an executive of Long Meadow Ranch, and Peter McCrea becoming a member of the board. The family gave raising funds for infrastructure updates, expanding the business into wholesale sales, and funding employee retirement benefits as reasons for the sale. The following year, Chelini retired, and Long Meadow Ranch achieved organic certification for the vineyard.

In December 2020, Long Meadow Ranch sold Stony Hill to Gaylon Lawrence Jr., an Arkansas billionaire who has bought several Napa Valley wineries since 2018, and Carlton McCoy Jr., a master sommelier; it is now part of Lawrence Wine Estates, of which McCoy is CEO. Jaimee Motley became the winemaker. She was replaced in 2021 by Reid Griggs. The winery closed and the cellars were extensively changed. Wine production now takes place elsewhere. The McCrea house has been renovated to serve as a tasting room and guest facility, the Residence at Stony Hill. Replanting of much of the vineyard had begun in 2020, and is rebalancing production to primarily red wines, which are more tolerant of the higher temperatures brought about by climate change. Cabernet Sauvignon will occupy 14 acres, Chardonnay 8.5 acres (reduced from 20 acres in 1990), and Cabernet Franc 5 acres. Wildfires in 2020 destroyed other Spring Mountain wineries and meant that Stony Hill could only produce white wines to avoid smoke taint; in 2021, the Cabernet vines were not mature and Stony Hill Cabernet was made using grapes from other Lawrence wineries. A proprietary white blend of Gewürztraminer, Chardonnay, and Riesling called L'Escalier was introduced in 2021. The winery's traditionally low prices have been raised to match other Napa Valley wineries.
