= Elechi Amadi =

Nigerian author and soldier (1934–2016)

Elechi Amadi MFR
- Born: Emmanuel Elechi Daniel; 12 May 1934; Aluu, Rivers State, Nigeria
- Died: 29 June 2016 (aged 82); Port Harcourt, Nigeria
- Occupation: Novelist
- Children: 6
- Writing career
- Notable work: The Concubine (1966)

Elechi Amadi MFR // (12 May 1934 – 29 June 2016) was a Nigerian author and soldier. He was a former member of the Nigerian Armed Forces. He was an author of plays and novels that are generally about African village life, customs, beliefs, and religious practices prior to contact with the Western world. Amadi is best regarded for his 1966 debut novel, The Concubine, which has been called "an outstanding work of pure fiction".

== Early life and education ==
Born on 12 May 1934, in Mbodo-Aluu in what is now the Ikwerre local government area of Rivers State, Nigeria, Elechi Amadi attended Government College, Umuahia (1948–52), Survey School, Oyo (1953–54), and the University of Ibadan (1955–59), where he obtained a degree in Physics and Mathematics. While at university, he adopted the name Elechi Amadi, which he felt reflected his Ikwerre heritage more than his birth name, Emmanuel Elechi Daniel. He is a member of the Ikwerre tribe.

== Career ==
He worked for a time as a land surveyor and later was a teacher at several schools, including the Nigerian Military School, Zaria (1963–66).

=== Military service and politics ===
Amadi served in the Nigerian army, remained there during the Nigerian Civil War, and retired at the rank of captain. He then held various positions with the Rivers State government: Permanent Secretary (1973–83), Commissioner for Education (1987–88) and Commissioner for Lands and Housing (1989–90).

=== Writing ===
He was a writer-in-residence and lecturer at Rivers State College of Education, where he has also been Dean of Arts, head of the literature department and Director of General Studies.

Amadi said that his first publication was in 1957, a poem entitled "Penitence" that was published in a University of Ibadan campus magazine called The Horn, edited by John Pepper Clark.

Amadi's first novel, The Concubine, was published in London in 1966 and was hailed as a "most accomplished first performance". Alastair Niven in his critical study of the novel wrote: "Rooted firmly among the hunting and fishing villages of the Niger delta, The Concubine nevertheless possesses the timelessness and universality of a major novel." The Concubine was made into a film, written by Elechi Amadi and directed by accomplished Nollywood film director Andy Amenechi, which premiered in Abuja in March 2007.

The setting of Amadi's second novel, The Great Ponds, published in 1969, is pre-colonial Eastern Nigeria, and is about the battle between two village communities over possession of a pond.

In 1973, Amadi's autobiographical non-fiction work, Sunset in Biafra, was published. It records his personal experiences in the Nigeria-Biafra war, and according to Niven "is written in a compelling narrative form as though it were a novel".

On 13 May 1989, a symposium was held at the University of Port Harcourt to celebrate Amadi's 55th birthday.

In May 2004, a conference was organized by the Association of Nigerian Authors, Rivers State Branch, to mark Elechi Amadi's 70th birthday.

For his last book, When God Came, Elechi turned for the first time to the genre of science fiction. Reviewing it, Lindsay Barrett wrote: "When an author has attained the status of an icon in his profession, based on the publication of works that have been declared iconic masterpieces from the earliest period of his career, it is unusual to find him engaging in experimentation in the latter stages of that career. This is the surprising trajectory that this short but profoundly memorable booklet by the late Elechi Amadi represents. Although the two narrative treatises contained in this work were described by the author as an excursion into the medium of science fiction it would really be more accurate to define them as philosophical allegories. Their contents contemplate the human condition and the limits of the potential for human achievement based on the concept of the supernatural rather than simply being exercises in the conceptualisation of events of an otherworldly nature, which popular science fiction often is. ... In the final analysis these works read like fables from the future that the author must have had immense enjoyment creating. Amadi's love for literature and his prolific output in his early years overshadowed his scientific background especially after the Civil War when he settled down to work as an educationist and public administrator in Rivers State. It was in this period that he embarked on the experiments in new forms of writing of which this work is a slight but unforgettable example."

== Later years ==
=== 2009 kidnapping ===
On 5 January 2009, Amadi was kidnapped at his home in Aluu town, Ikwerre, by unknown gunmen. He was released on the evening of 6 January, 23 hours later.

=== Africa39 ===
In 2014, Amadi was a judge of Africa39, together with Tess Onwueme and Margaret Busby.

=== Death ===
On 29 June 2016, Amadi died at the Good Heart Hospital in Port Harcourt, at the age of 82. Nobel laureate Wole Soyinka paid tribute to Amadi as "a soldier and poet, captive of conscience, human solidarity and justice".

== Awards ==
- 1992 – Rivers State Silver Jubilee Merit Award.
- 2003 – honorary doctorate, Doctor of Science (D.Sc.) in Education, honoris causa, awarded by Rivers State University of Science and Technology.
- 2003 – Fellow of the Nigerian Academy of Education.
- 2003 – Member of the Order of the Federal Republic (MFR).

== Legacy ==
The Faculty of Humanity in University of Port Harcourt, is dedicated to him. Port Harcourt Polytechnic was renamed to Captain Elechi Amadi Polytechnic in 2016.

== Bibliography ==
- The Concubine (novel), London: Heinemann African Writers Series, 1969; Ibadan: Heinemann Books, 1993, ISBN 0-435-90025-0
- The Great Ponds (novel), Heinemann, 1969; Macmillan Education, 1976, ISBN 978-0435270261
- Sunset in Biafra (war diary), Heinemann African Writers Series, 1969, ISBN 978-0435901400
- Isiburu (play), Heinemann, 1973, ISBN 978-0435925086
- Peppersoup and The Road (plays, combined volume), Ibadan: Onibonoje Publishers, 1977
- Dancer of Johannesburg (play), Ibadan: Onibonoje Publishers, 1978
- The Slave (novel), Heinemann African Writers Series, 1978, ISBN 978-0435902100
- Ethics in Nigerian Culture (philosophy), London: Heinemann Educational Books, 1982, ISBN 978-9781295966
- Estrangement (novel), Heinemann African Writers Series, 1986, ISBN 978-0435905644
- The Woman of Calabar (play), Port Harcourt: Gitelle Press, 2002
- Speaking and Singing (essays and poems), University of Port Harcourt Press, 2003
- Collected Plays (ed. Seiyifa Koroye), Port Harcourt: Pearl Publishers, 2004
- When God Came, 2011
