= Zvi Jagendorf =

Israeli author and translator

Zvi Jagendorf (Hebrew צבי יגנדורף; born February 18, 1936, in Vienna, Austria) is an Israeli writer. Together with his parents, Zvi Jagendorf managed to escape Austria to the United Kingdom in 1939. He studied English literature at Oxford University and emigrated to Israel after graduating in 1958. Jagendorf taught English literature and theater studies at the Hebrew University of Jerusalem. He has also appeared as an actor, theater critic and translator, but he became known to a larger audience as the author of numerous short stories and two novels. His autobiographically inspired 2001 debut novel, Wolfy and the Strudelbakers was nominated for the Booker Prize and the Wingate Prize and awarded the Sagittarius Prize.

His second novel, Coming Soon: The Flood, is set in 1960s Jerusalem.
