= Sterling Vineyards =

Winery near Calistoga, California, U.S.

Coordinates: 38.5696°N 122.5449°W

- Location: Calistoga, California, USA
- Appellation: Napa Valley AVA
- Founded: 1964
- First vintage: 1969
- Key people: Peter Newton, Founder; Harry Hansen, Winemaker
- Parent company: Treasury Wine Estates
- Cases/yr: 400,000
- Known for: Napa Cabernet
- Varietals: Cabernet Sauvignon, Merlot, Chardonnay, Sauvignon blanc
- Tasting: tasting room
- Website: http://www.sterlingvineyards.com/

Sterling Vineyards is a winery near Calistoga, California, owned by Treasury Wine Estates. The winery achieved international recognition when its wine won first place in the Ottawa Wine Tasting of 1981.

== Description ==
Visitors to the winery take a short cable car ride from the main entrance to the villa and distillery which sits upon a hill looking over the Napa Valley.

Sterling Vineyards farms 1,200 acres (486 ha) of vines in various parts of Napa Valley. Production emphasizes Bordeaux and Burgundy-style wines, and is split in several tiers: the entry-level "Napa Valley" wines for which it is most famous, "Reserve" wines (their highest level), "Single Vineyard" wines (specialty wines for enthusiasts), "Vintner's Collection" (value wines for restaurants and mass distribution), and "Cellar Club" (limited production and eclectic wines for their wine club members).

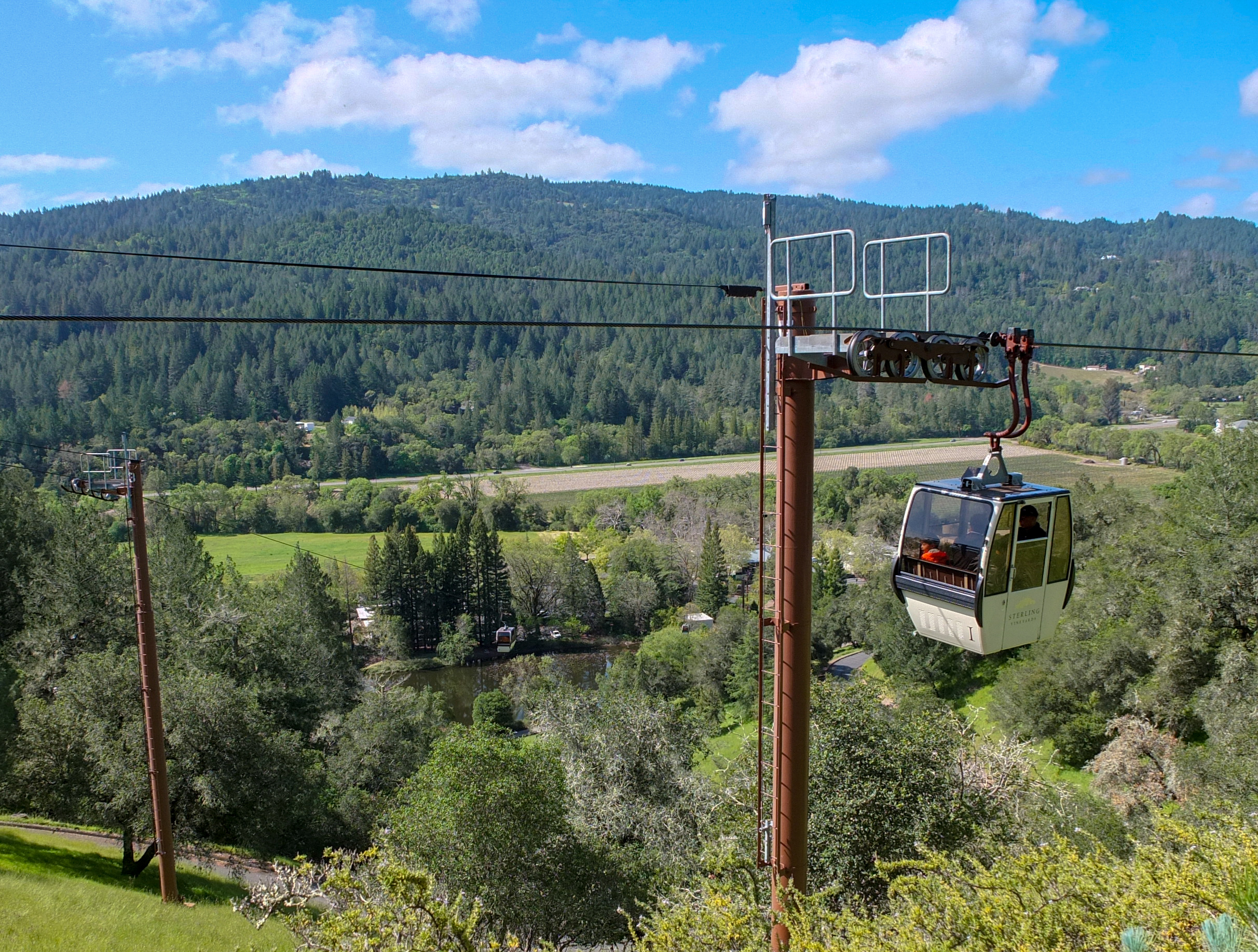
Gondola lift at the winery

Sterling Vineyards is a popular destination for tourists, in part for a gondola lift that shuttles visitors from a parking lot to the winery, which sits on a volcanic hill 300 feet (91 m) above the valley floor. The building is designed to appear like the white villages of the Greek island Mykonos, and incorporates bells from St. Dunstans's in London, England, a church destroyed in World War II.

== History ==
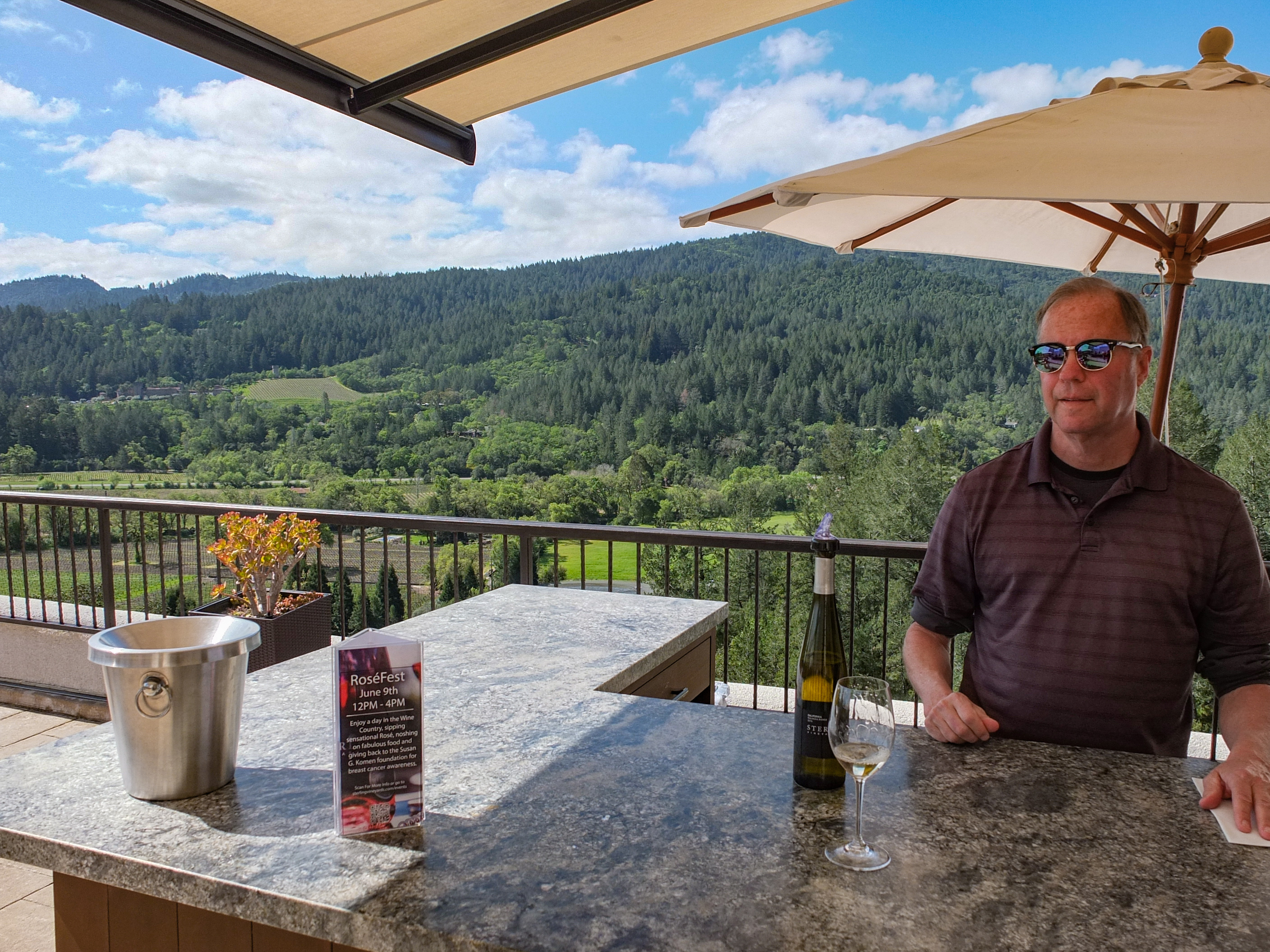
Last serving station on the wine tasting tour

English expatriate Peter Newton founded the company in 1964, with the first year of production in 1969. He planted Merlot and Chardonnay, now very common in Napa Valley, at a time most vineyards were focusing on Cabernet Sauvignon. Under long-time winemaker Ric Forman (later of Abreu Vineyards), they released California's first vintage-dated Merlot. The Coca-Cola Company bought the winery in 1977, in a short-lived attempt to enter the wine market. Seagram bought the winery in 1982, and was in turn purchased by Diageo in 2001. Treasury Wine Estates bought most of Diageo's US wines in 2016.

== See also ==
- California wine
