= Boyd Tonkin =

English writer, journalist, and literary critic

Boyd Tonkin Hon FRSL
- Born: London, England
- Education: Trinity College, Cambridge University
- Occupations: Writer, journalist and literary critic
- Notable work: The 100 Best Novels in Translation (2018)
- Awards: Benson Medal (2020)

Boyd Tonkin Hon. FRSL is an English writer, journalist and literary critic. He was the literary editor of The Independent newspaper from 1996 to 2013. A long-time proponent of foreign-language literature, he is the author of The 100 Best Novels in Translation (2018). He has been involved with leading literary prizes such as the Man Booker International Prize and the Independent Foreign Fiction Prize. In 2020, Tonkin was the recipient of the Benson Medal from the Royal Society of Literature.

== Career ==
Tonkin was born in North London and studied English and French literature at Trinity College, Cambridge University, as both an entrance scholar and a senior scholar. He worked as a lecturer in literature, before exchanging academia for journalism, initially as a staff writer and features editor on the magazine Community Care. He then worked at the New Statesman as social affairs editor and on the books desk, before going on to The Independent, where he was literary editor from 1996 to 2013 and Senior Writer and Art Critic until 2016.

In 2001, Tonkin re-founded the Independent Foreign Fiction Prize – established in 1990 to honour author and translator equally – which he co-judged until it was merged with the Man Booker International Prize in 2015. He chaired the judging panel of the Man Booker in 2016, and other prizes for which he has served as a judge include the OCM Bocas Prize for Caribbean Literature, the Wasafiri New Writing Prize, the Whitbread biography award, the Commonwealth Writers Prize, the David Cohen Prize (2007) and the Prix Cévennes.

In addition to his work for The Independent, Tonkin has written for The Observer, Financial Times, The Guardian, The Economist, The Spectator, New Scientist and Newsweek, among other publications, is a contributor to arts and current-affairs programmes on BBC Radio, and has been a commentator on literary issues internationally, as well as an invited participant and speaker at festivals and educational institutions worldwide.

He is the author of the book The 100 Best Novels in Translation (Galileo, 2018), a "cross-border guide to fiction", about which Ian McEwan said: "This is a brilliant and extremely useful guide, approachable on every level. Boyd Tonkin opens up infinite worlds of the imagination."

In November 2020, Tonkin was awarded the Benson Medal and was elected an Honorary Fellow of the Royal Society of Literature (RSL). Lisa Appignanesi, chair of the RSL, described Tonkin as "one of the key people in the shaping of literature in the UK."

== Bibliography ==
=== Books ===
- The 100 Best Novels in Translation (Galileo, 2018)

=== Selected articles ===
- "Back to basics (yet again)", The Independent, 2 October 2000.
- "The good life of a gentle anarchist", The Independent, 19 February 2010.
- "Vandalism on a worse scale than the riots", The Independent, 17 October 2011.
- "The Power of Word", Critical Muslim, 14.3, 2015.
- "On the waterfront: Lisbon's riverside regeneration", The Observer, 25 September 2016.
- "J.M.W. Turner, Radical Critic of the Anthropocene", The New York Review, 11 November 2020.
- "The dark heart of Joseph Conrad", UnHerd, 2 September 2024.
- "Weird and wonderful: The Warburg Institute's £14.5 million makeover", The Times Literary Supplement, 18 October 2024.
- "The religion of Ronald Blythe", Prospect, 29 January 2025.
- "What if Napoleon had won? Counterfactual history has seldom been so rich", UnHerd, 15 December 2025.
