= Peter Newton (vintner) =

English-born American winemaker (1926–2008)

- Born: Peter Leigh Newton; 27 August 1926; London, England
- Died: 4 February 2008 (aged 81); St. Helena, California, US
- Education: Charterhouse School; Balliol College, Oxford
- Occupation: Winemaker
- Known for: Founder of Sterling Vineyards and Newton Vineyard
- Spouses: Anne St. Aubyn (m. 1951; died 1970) Su Hua Lin (m. 1979; div. 2005)
- Children: 3, including Nigel Newton
- Parent: Frank Newton (father)
- Relatives: Kenneth Newton (brother)

Peter Leigh Newton (27 August 1926 – 4 February 2008) was an English-American vintner, the founder of Sterling Vineyards and Newton Vineyard.

== Early life ==
Peter Leigh Newton was born in London on 27 August 1926, the son of racing driver Frank Newton (who won the Montagu Cup in 1908 at Brooklands). He and his brother Kenneth were educated at Charterhouse School. He earned a law degree from Balliol College, Oxford, in 1949. Newton served in the British Army Rifle Corps during World War II.

== Career ==
Newton became a journalist with the Financial Times by chance, after writing a letter to the editor of the newspaper with "his views on the nationalisation of the UK iron and steel industry", and the newspaper offered him a job. In 1950, he was posted to San Francisco, California, as their West Coast correspondent. In 1951, he founded his first business, Sterling International, a San Francisco wholesale paper company specialising in tissue paper, at first importing British products into the US and later specialising in the trading of paper and pulp, manufacturing in Canada, Trinidad and Thailand, and later sold it.

Newton founded Sterling Vineyards in 1964 and later, Newton Vineyard. He was responsible for designing and building Sterling Vineyards in 1973, on a hill close to Calistoga, with access to the winery building via an aerial tramway. Prince Charles visited from England in 1977, and was "delighted" by the winery and its wines. In 1979, Newton sold Sterling to Coca-Cola, and started a new more exclusive venture, Newton Vineyard, a pioneer in Napa Valley Merlot, and best known for its "trademark" unfiltered Chardonnay and Merlot.

== Personal life ==
In 1950, he met an American, Anne St. Aubyn, at a party at his home in Pelham Place, Kensington, London. They married on 28 December 1951 at St Dominic's Church, San Francisco (her hometown), and had three children: Carol Boone of San Francisco; Gail Showley of St. Helena; and Nigel Newton of London. Anne Newton died in 1970. In 1979, Newton married Su Hua Lin, and they divorced in 2005.

In later life, he was very proud that his granddaughter Alice, then eight, "discovered Harry Potter", after his son Nigel Newton, founder of Bloomsbury Publishing, gave her in 1997 a chapter of a new manuscript by the then unknown J. K. Rowling, already rejected by many other publishers, and she loved it.

At his home in St. Helena, California, Newton built 15 separate gardens, including Zen, rose, hanging and traditional English, even including a croquet lawn.

Newton died on 4 February 2008, at his St. Helena home, aged 81, and was buried there at the Grace Episcopal Church Cemetery.
