= Newton Vineyard =

Napa Valley grape orchard

- Location: St. Helena, California, USA
- Appellation: Spring Mountain District AVA
- Founded: 1977
- Key people: Peter Newton and Sua Newton, founders; John Kongsgaard, previous winemaker; Jean-Baptiste Rivail, estate director
- Parent company: LVMH
- Known for: Unfiltered Chardonnay, "Le Puzzle" red blend
- Varietals: Chardonnay, Cabernet Sauvignon, Merlot
- Website: newtonvineyard.com

Newton Vineyard is a wine estate on Spring Mountain near St. Helena in California's Napa Valley. Founded in 1977 by Peter Newton and his wife, it was part of the Estates & Wines division of LVMH, which acquired a controlling interest in the business in 2001, until 2025, when it was sold to Napa locals Eric Bryan Seuthe and Nick Livanos. It was extensively damaged in 2020's Glass Fire and is currently being restored to its former glory by new ownership.

== History ==
Peter Newton, who had previously co-founded Sterling Vineyards, founded Newton Vineyard in 1977 with his wife, Su Hua. Originally one square mile, it was one of the first wineries on Spring Mountain.

The French luxury goods conglomerate LVMH acquired a majority stake in Newton Vineyard in 2001 through its subsidiary Veuve Clicquot Ponsardin. After Peter Newton died in 2008, the Newton family retained a 10% share in the business. In 2018, it was LVMH's first American property to open temporarily to the public as part of the company's biennial Journées Particulières; it then began to offer visits by appointment.

The 500-acre Spring Mountain winery was hidden from view by forest. Landscaped with formal gardens and cypress trees, it had multi-level cellars and a Japanese-style pagoda housing a laboratory and a fermentation room. The property was renovated in 2019–20 at a cost of $10 million, and the vineyards were converted to organic viticulture. Weeks after the completion of work, it was severely damaged by the Glass Fire in September 2020; of 68 acres under vine, only 5 survived, 6,000 trees were killed, and most of the buildings, including the tasting room, were destroyed. Newton moved production to Brasswood in St. Helena, where in 2021 it offered wine tastings and lunch with wine pairings by appointment; the following year, it opened a tasting room in Calistoga.

In 2021, Newton Vineyard was planning to rebuild, but after its Calistoga lease ran out in 2024, in early 2025 it announced that it would be closing permanently. However, Napa locals Eric Bryan Seuthe and Nick Livanos purchased the property from LVMH in 2025, and have begun renovations to restore the original Newton Spring Mountain property to its former glory.

== Winery ==
From 1983 to 1996, Newton Vineyard's Chardonnay production was guided by winemaker John Kongsgaard, and used grapes from his vineyard. Those wines, produced by a French-influenced methodology involving lengthy aging without filtration, were influential in California. The winery continued to be known for unfiltered wines, lower in alcohol than other Napa Valley wines, and in 2009 began an annual sponsorship of an artist to produce a limited-edition wine-related item in support of its "eco-chic" image. Robert Mann became estate director and winemaker in 2014. In 2017, Jean-Baptiste Rivail became estate director. Alberto Bianchi, who became head winemaker in 2016, was succeeded in July 2021 by Andrew Holve.

At the time of its acquisition by LVMH in 2001, Newton Vineyard owned more than 130 acres of vineyards and had an annual production of 28,000–40,000 cases of Cabernet Sauvignon, Chardonnay, and Merlot, produced by the Newtons under consultation with oenologist Michel Rolland. As of 2017, it owned 170 acres, in the Yountville and Mount Veeder appellation areas as well as the winery location on Spring Mountain, where a 2012 replanting had focused on Cabernet. Until that year, Newton incorporated Cabernet from all three vineyards in its red wine blend, sold under the Le Puzzle brand; for the 2014 vintage, wine from the three was bottled separately. Newton's annual production before the 2020 fire was approximately 20,000 cases.
