= Abreu Vineyards =

Winery in Napa Valley, California

- Location: St. Helena, CA, USA
- Other labels: Madrona Ranch, Cappella, Thorevilos, Las Posadas
- Founded: 1980
- First vintage: 1987
- Key people: David Abreu, Viticulturist; Brad Grimes, Winemaker
- Other products: Estate Grown Olive Oil
- Distribution: limited
- Website: abreuvineyards.com

Abreu Vineyards is a winery in Napa Valley, California founded by the viticulturist David Abreu.

== History ==
In 1980, David formed David Abreu Vineyard Management, working with winemaker Richard Forman to manage ranching operations at Inglenook Winery.

By 1999, he was described by Forman as "probably the premier viticulturist for premium grapes in Napa Valley." In 2006 Abreu was hired to replant vineyards at Screaming Eagle Winery and Vineyards.

Label of Abreu 1993 Cabernet blend

== Wine ==
In 1998 wine critic Robert Parker included Abreu in his list of the "most influential wine personalities of the last 20 years". Parker awarded the 1997 Madrona Ranch cabernet a 100-point score, one of only 140 wines in the world to receive the honor. As of the 2021 vintage, Abreu Vineyards holds twelve, 100-point scores from Robert Parker's Wine Advocate.

In the "Judgment of Sauternes" of October, 2006, the 1995 vintage Cabernet blend was judged the winner among Cabernet-Merlot blends from Bordeaux and California, 16 each, in a blind tasting arranged by the Grand Jury Européen. The 1999 production was 500 cases (45.000 hL; 1,188.774 U.S. gal). In the late 1990s Abreu and Forman jointly leased and planted the 20-acre (8.1 ha) Thorevilos Vineyard. They released Abreu's first cabernet from that vineyard in 2000.
