= Liz Calder =

British publisher (born 1938)

Liz Calder CBE
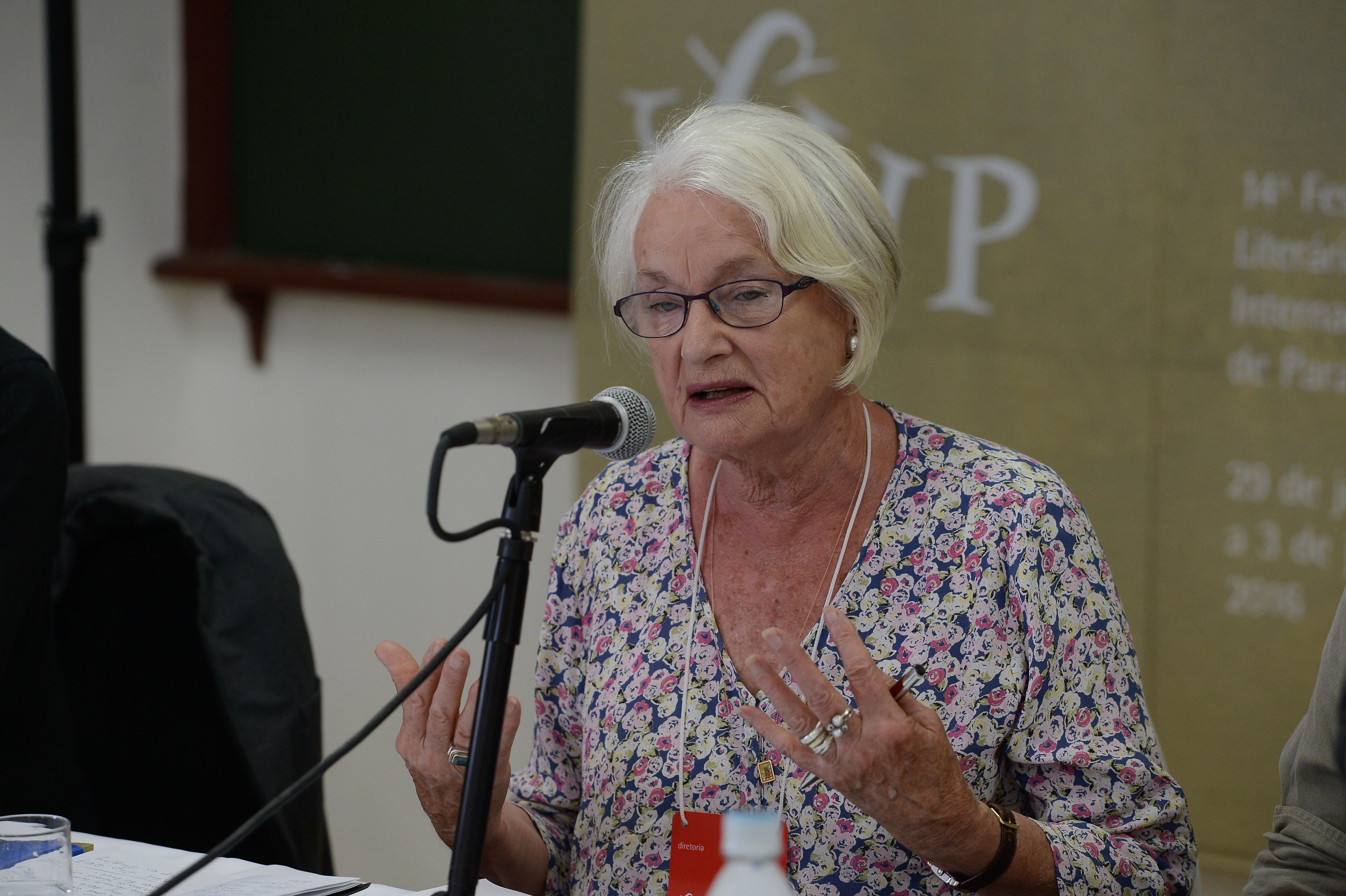
- Born: Elisabeth Nicole Baber; 20 January 1938 (age 88); London, England
- Education: University of Canterbury (BA)
- Occupations: Publisher; book editor

Elisabeth Nicole Calder CBE (née Baber; born 20 January 1938) is an English publisher and book editor.

== Early life ==
Calder was born Elisabeth Nicole Baber in London on 20 January 1938, the daughter of Florence Mary Baber (née Woodrow) and Ivor George Baber. She spent her early years in London, and in 1949 she emigrated with her family to New Zealand. She graduated with a BA degree in English literature from the University of Canterbury in 1958 and returned to the United Kingdom. During the 1960s, she lived in Canada and the United States and, for four years, in São Paulo, Brazil.

== Career ==
Calder began her publishing career in 1971 at Victor Gollancz Ltd, where she published Salman Rushdie’s first novel Grimus (1975), John Irving's The World According to Garp (1978) and Angela Carter's The Passion of New Eve 91977).

Joining Jonathan Cape in 1979, Calder published two Man Booker Prize winners: Salman Rushdie's Midnight's Children (1981) and Anita Brookner's Hotel du Lac (1984). Calder was also Julian Barnes' editor for his first four novels, including Flaubert's Parrot. In 1986, she became a founder director of Bloomsbury Publishing, where her list included Booker winners Margaret Atwood and Michael Ondaatje and Nobel literature laureate Nadine Gordimer. In 1997, Calder was named Editor of the Year at the British Book Awards. She was a founder of the Groucho Club and the Orange Prize for Fiction. In 2010, she was a judge on the Orange Prize.

She was chair of the Royal Court Theatre (2000–2003), and since 2003 has been President of the Parati International Literary Festival (Festa Literária Internacional de Paraty, FLIP) in Brazil. She was awarded the Brazilian National Order of the Southern Cross and the Order of Cultural Merit in 2004. In 2012, she was awarded an Honorary Doctorate by University Campus Suffolk.

In 2009, she joined John and Genevieve Christie and Louis Baum to set up a Suffolk-based publishing house, Full Circle Editions. In October 2013, Full Circle produced FlipSide, a Brazilian literary and music festival, at Snape Maltings, Suffolk, home of Aldeburgh Music.

In the 2018 Birthday Honours, Calder was appointed Commander of the Order of the British Empire (CBE) for services to literature. She received the award from Prince Charles, Prince of Wales at Buckingham Palace in December 2018. In the same month she was confirmed as one of the judges for the 2019 Man Booker Prize. Also in 2018, Calder was made an Honorary Fellow of the Royal Society of Literature and received the RSL Benson Medal in recognition of her "meritorious works in poetry, fiction, history and belles lettres". In 2019, Calder was conferred an honorary Doctor of Letters degree by the University of Canterbury.
