= Castellucci =

Castellucci is an Italian surname. Notable people with the surname include:

- Cecil Castellucci (born 1969), American-born Canadian young adult novelist, indie rocker and director
- Giovanni Castellucci (born 1959), Italian businessman
- Lars Castellucci (born 1974), German politician
- Romeo Castellucci (born 1960), Italian theater director, playwright, artist and designer
- Salvi Castellucci (1608–1672), Italian painter
- Teddy Castellucci (born 1965), American film score composer
