= Bradford Literature Festival =

Festival in West Yorkshire, England

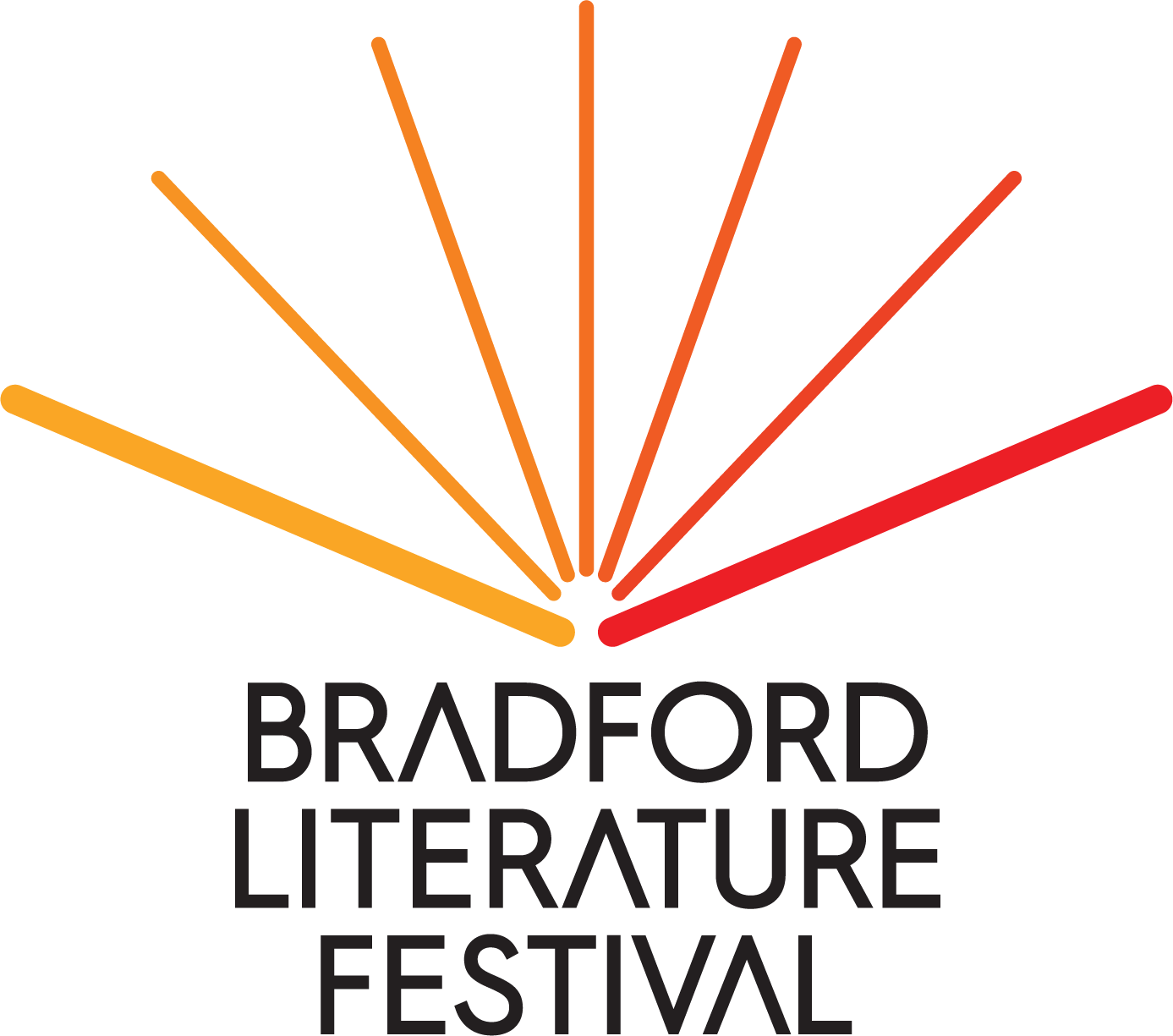
- Status: Active
- Genre: Festival
- Begins: Mid June (variable dates
- Ends: Mid July (variable dates)
- Frequency: Annually
- Locations: Bradford, West Yorkshire
- Country: England
- Years active: 12
- Inaugurated: 2014
- Founders: Syima Aslam; Irna Qureshi
- Most recent: 2026
- Next event: 2027
- Participants: 700
- Attendance: 200,000
- Organiser: Culture Squared
- Filing status: community interest company
- Website: Official website

The Bradford Literature Festival (sometimes abbreviated to BLF) is a spoken and written word event that promotes literature and is held for ten days annually over June and July in Bradford, West Yorkshire, England. The first event was held in 2014 and was attended by 968 people; over the next decade the attendance had risen to over 115,000 per year. The event is noted for its attendance by minority groups and writers, with over 50% of attendees coming from BAME backgrounds and 85% of attendees benefitting from free tickets as part of the Ethical Ticketing Policy.

== History ==
The Festival was started by Syima Aslam and Irna Qureshi in 2014 for a weekend. By the time of the 2017 event, they had a full-time staff of seven besides themselves with funding from Bradford Council, the Arts Council and the National Lottery. After the short weekend festival in 2014, the event was extended to ten days across late June/early July for the 2017 and 2018 and 2019 festivals. The 2016 event was held in late May of that year. The festival is a series of events held at different locations across the Bradford District including theatres such as the Alhambra, bookshops, schools, colleges, Bradford City Hall, bars and art galleries. Whilst the emphasis is on the written word, some parts of the event include the arts, theatre, film, music and talks by people such as the former boxer, Frank Bruno, hip-hop artist Akala, 80's icon Luke Goss and former footballer John Barnes.

In 2018, in celebration of the 200th anniversary of Emily Brontë's birth, the festival installed four stones engraved with specially commissioned poems from four contemporary female writers, at strategic points between Thornton and Haworth. Jeanette Winterson, Carol Ann Duffy, Jackie Kay and Kate Bush each wrote a poem to adorn the stones. The stones form a walk which connects the Bronte birthplace at Thornton, with the Bronte Parsonage Museum in Haworth. In 2018, Bradford Literature Festival was awarded Tourism Event of the Year at the White Rose Awards.

In 2019, speakers included Jeanette Winterson, Elif Shafak, John Barnes, Habib Ali al-Jifri, Luke Goss, Saul Williams, Lady Leshurr and Michael Rosen, attracting an audience of over 70,000 including a free education programme which reached over 18,000 young people. Approximately 15 of the 500+ booked speakers pulled out of the event when it was revealed that some of the sponsorship for the festival had come from the Home Office's Building a Stronger Britain Together programme. One of those who withdrew, journalist Hussein Kesvani, stated that if he had appeared at the festival, then it would have been a conflict of interest. Some of the young Muslims whom he had interviewed "expressed how the expansive counter-extremism programme had affected their ability to express their religious identity".

In 2020, the COVID-19 pandemic had a drastic change to the festival programming. In response to the challenges of social distancing, BLF produced an all-digital festival and began a partnership with Reading is Magic Festival and Adab Festival Pakistan, increasing its international reach.

In 2021, the festival moved to a hybrid festival, programming 49 live event and 50 digital events, attracting an audience of 114,139 people, with 57% BAME visitors. In response to the COVID-19 climate, five Family Fun Days entitled ‘Literature Unlocked’ were held at public parks across the city.

In 2022, the 10-day literary and cultural celebration attracted 56,338 visitors in June/July 2022, an 81% return on pre-Covid audiences, and was heralded as the “Glastonbury of literature festivals”. In just eight years, Bradford Literature Festival established itself as one of the largest literature festivals in the UK and the industry leader for championing socio-economic and ethnic diversity of audiences and artists alike. Welcoming audiences from across the Bradford district, the breadth of the UK, and from overseas.

In 2023, attendance doubled to 116,225 with 678 events and 63,350 engagements with children and young people.

In 2024, Bradford Literature Festival celebrated its 10th anniversary with 699 events across the 10-day festival. Attendance increased to over 155,900, including 58,700 children and young people. BLF also unveiled a new partnership with Network Rail, which raised awareness of the festival through takeovers at nine major railway stations across the UK, including five stations in London. In 2024, Bradford Literature Festival was awarded the Culture Award at the Yorkshire Post Tourism Awards. In 2024, Bradford Literature Festival was also named in the Global Business Awards as Most Diverse & Inclusive Arts Festival - Europe.

In 2025, over 187,300 people, including 31,690 children and young people, attended 752 events during the 10-day festival. The festival included 11 exhibitions, and 52 Education sessions for Primary and Secondary students. In 2025, BLF partnered with The Reading Agency and BBC Arts to launch The Big Tasty Read, a national celebration of reading and collaboration which recognises the connection between food, culture, and storytelling. The campaign was delivered as part of Bradford 2025 City of Culture. In 2025, Bradford Literature Festival was nominated for the Community Arts Award at the Yorkshire Choice Awards 2025. The festival received Leading Literature Festival from the SME Business Elite Awards 2025, and the Community Engagement Award at the Eastern Eye Arts Culture & Theatre Awards 2025.

In 2026, 200,915 people attended 762 events with 490 artists. As well as the main festival, BLF hosted 12 themed Education Programme days, attended by over 38,000 students from 60 schools.

The 2027 edition of the festival is scheduled to take place from 11 to 20 June 2027.

== Events ==
Date	Attendance	No of events	Notable people	Notes
2014	968	24	Christa Ackroyd, Lemn Sissay, Steve Antony, Karen McCombie, Kate Rhodes, Penny Hancock, Shazia Mirza, Damian Le Bas, Brian Liddy, Inder Goldfinger, Katy Carr,	
15–24 May 2015	11,000	150	Shabnam Khan, Brian Patten, Sukina Owen-Douglas	
20–29 May 2016	32,000	200	Carol Ann Duffy, Nadiya Hussain, Baroness Sayeeda Warsi	
30 June–9 July 2017	50,0000	300	Jeanette Winterson, Joanna Trollope, Linton Kwesi Johnson, Germaine Greer	
29 June–8 July 2018	70,000	400	Frank Bruno, Suzi Quatro, Kate Bush	
28 June–7 July 2019	69,862	432	John Barnes, Luke Goss, Elif Shafak, Charly Cox, Sabrina Mahfouz, Juan Felipe Herrera, Imtiaz Dharker, Rachel Reeves, Tracy Brabin, Kate McCann	
~~2020~~	32,619 (digitally)	99	Christopher Eccleston, Lowkey, Shaykh Abdal Hakim Murad, Ilhan Omar, Joseph Coelho, Ian Rankin	In person events cancelled due to COVID-19 pandemic. Digital events proceeded.
25 June–4 July 2021	114,139	100	Caitlin Moran, Abdul Hakim Murad, Jeanette Wilson, Michael Rosen, A A Dhand, Anita Rani, Saima Mir, Aamnah Rashman, Tez Ilyas, Jacqueline Wilson	220 speakers in 100 sessions, with 50% of these online
24 June–3 July 2022	57,000	450+	Lemn Sissay, Asma Khan, Joelle Taylor, Malika Booker, Anthony Anaxagorou, Delia Smith, Ed Balls, Jon Barnes, Dom Joly, Andy Haldane,	First full in–person event since the COVID pandemic.
23 June - 2 July 2023	116,225	678	Anita Rani, Sir Lenny Henry, Lemn Sissay, Sir Michael Palin, Shaykh Al-Yaqoubi, Angela Rayner, Bolu Babalola, Ben Okri, Gary Younge, AC Grayling, A A Dhand, Adam Kay,	
28 June - 7 July 2024	155,900	699	Miriam Margolyes, Shaykh Hamza Yusuf, Sara Pascoe, Ruby Wax, Lemn Sissay, Shaparak Khorsandi, Corinne Bailey Rae, Mary Beard, Kate Bottley, Husam Zomlot, Joelle Taylor, DJ Paulette	10th anniversary year.
27 June - 6 July 2025	187,300	752	John Cooper Clarke, Celia Imrie, Jeremy Corbyn, Ash Sarkar, Reeta Chakrabarti, Shaykh Hamza Yusuf, Lemn Sissay, Griff Rhys Jones, Larry Lamb, Steph McGovern, Grace Dent	
3 - 12 July 2026	200,915	762	Jeremy Corbyn, Ro Mitchell, Shayk Al Yaqoubi, Lemn sissay, David Larbi, Husam Zomlot, Humza Yousaf, Misan Harriman, Fatima Bhutto, Prue Leith	
