= Michael Arditti =

English writer

Michael Arditti FRSL is an English writer. He has written twelve novels, including Easter, The Enemy of the Good, Jubilate and The Breath of Night, and also a collection of short stories, Good Clean Fun. His most recent novel, The Anointed, was published in April 2020. He is a prolific literary critic and an occasional broadcaster for the BBC. Much of his work explores issues of spirituality and sexuality. He has been described by Philip Pullman as "our best chronicler of the rewards and pitfalls of present-day faith".

== Biography ==
Michael Arditti was born in Cheshire and educated at Rydal School, where he was head boy and editor of the school magazine, and at Jesus College, Cambridge. He was a Cambridge contemporary of theatre directors Nicholas Hytner and Declan Donnellan.

In his early career, he wrote plays for the stage and the radio. His first play, The Volunteer, was loosely based on his experience working in a Boys Assessment Centre. It was produced by the National Youth Theatre. In 1989 his play The Ceremony of Innocence was performed at Liverpool Playhouse. Between 1985 and 1991, he had several plays broadcast on Radio Four: Something To Scare Off The Birds, The Morning Room, The Chatelaine and The Family Hotel.

His first novel was The Celibate, published in 1993. His third, Easter, won the Waterstone’s Mardi Gras award. His other novels have been shortlisted and longlisted for various awards. He was a Harold Hyam Wingate Scholar in 2000, a Royal Literary Fund Fellow in 2001 and the Leverhulme artist in residence at the Freud Museum in 2008. He won an Oppenheim–John Downes memorial award in 2003, and Arts Council awards in 2004 and 2007.

Arditti has also been a theatre critic, notably for the London Evening Standard and, from 2013 to 2020, for the Sunday Express.

He was awarded an Honorary DLitt by the University of Chester in 2013 and was elected a Fellow of the Royal Society of Literature in 2022.

== Themes and reception ==
Writing in the Guardian in 2013, Arditti explained his interest in creating works of fiction that deal with religious faith. He argued that "conflict between the individual conscience and biblical tradition ... offers the richest seam for a religious novelist to mine today", adding that "I lament the lack of novelists willing to tackle the increasingly violent struggle between liberalism and fundamentalism". In a 2018 interview with the Church Times, he commented that faith has become an unfashionable literary subject because "religion has been hijacked by extremists on all sides". He also noted that "one strand of my work ... look[s] at the integration of sexuality and spirituality, especially among gay people". He has been an outspoken critic of the right wing of the Church of England who judge homosexuality a sin.

Ruth Scurr in 2009 noted that Arditti took the title of his novel The Enemy of the Good from Voltaire: "Arditti writes with the same compassion and humanity as Voltaire, but without the biting satire." She argued, "There are echoes of Evelyn Waugh’s Brideshead Revisited in the way Arditti explores faith through the complicated, genteel Granville family. But whereas Waugh focused on Roman Catholicism, Arditti ranges across a wide spectrum of religious belief: Anglicanism, Islam, Buddhism and Judaism are all brought into the story."

Christian House, reviewing Arditti's The Breath of Night for the Independent in 2013, commented that "The novel broaches a curious irony of contemporary society; that when it is crippled by rage, fear and materialism, when the need of spiritual sustenance is acute, it has become increasingly secular". In 2018, Peter Stanford in the Guardian praised Arditti's novel Of Men and Angels, writing that, as a novelist preoccupied with questions of faith, Arditti was "often a lone voice in a genre that used to be crowded with the likes of Graham Greene, Muriel Spark and Evelyn Waugh". Stanford pronounced him "a master storyteller who uses his theological literacy sparingly". Reviewing The Anointed for the Financial Times in 2020, Rebecca Abrams noted that his "boldest innovation is his handling of religious orthodoxy and its close entanglement with political power".

== Works ==
=== Novels ===
- The Celibate (1993)
- Pagan and her Parents (1997) US title Pagan's Father
- Easter (2000)
- Unity (2005)
- A Sea Change (2006)
- The Enemy of the Good (2009)
- Jubilate (2011)
- The Breath of Night (2013)
- Widows and Orphans (2015)
- Of Men and Angels (2018)
- The Anointed (2020)
- The Young Pretender (2022)

=== Short stories ===
- Good Clean Fun (2004) collection
- "The Loyal Wife" in The Gay Times Book of Short Stories, ed. P-P Hartnett (2000)
- "In The Event of" in When It Changed, ed. Geoff Ryman (2009)

=== Stage plays ===
- The Volunteer, the National Youth Theatre at the Shaw (1980)
- The Freshman, National Student Theatre Company (1984)
- The Ceremony of Innocence, Liverpool Playhouse (1989)

=== Radio plays ===
- Something To Scare Off The Birds, Radio Four Monday play (1985)
- The Morning Room, Radio Four (1985)
- The Chatelaine, Radio Four Monday play (1987)
- The Family Hotel, Radio Four Monday play (1991)
