= Irna =

Irna may refer to:

== People ==
- Irna Narulita (born 1970), Indonesian politician
- Irna Phillips (1901–1973), American author and actress
- Irna Qureshi, British ethnographer and writer on British Asian culture

== Places ==
- Umm Irna Formation, Jordan, a geological formation

== Other ==
- Cyclone Irna of the 1991–92 South-West Indian Ocean cyclone season
- Islamic Republic News Agency, official news agency of Iran
