= Royal Society of Literature =

Literature society in London

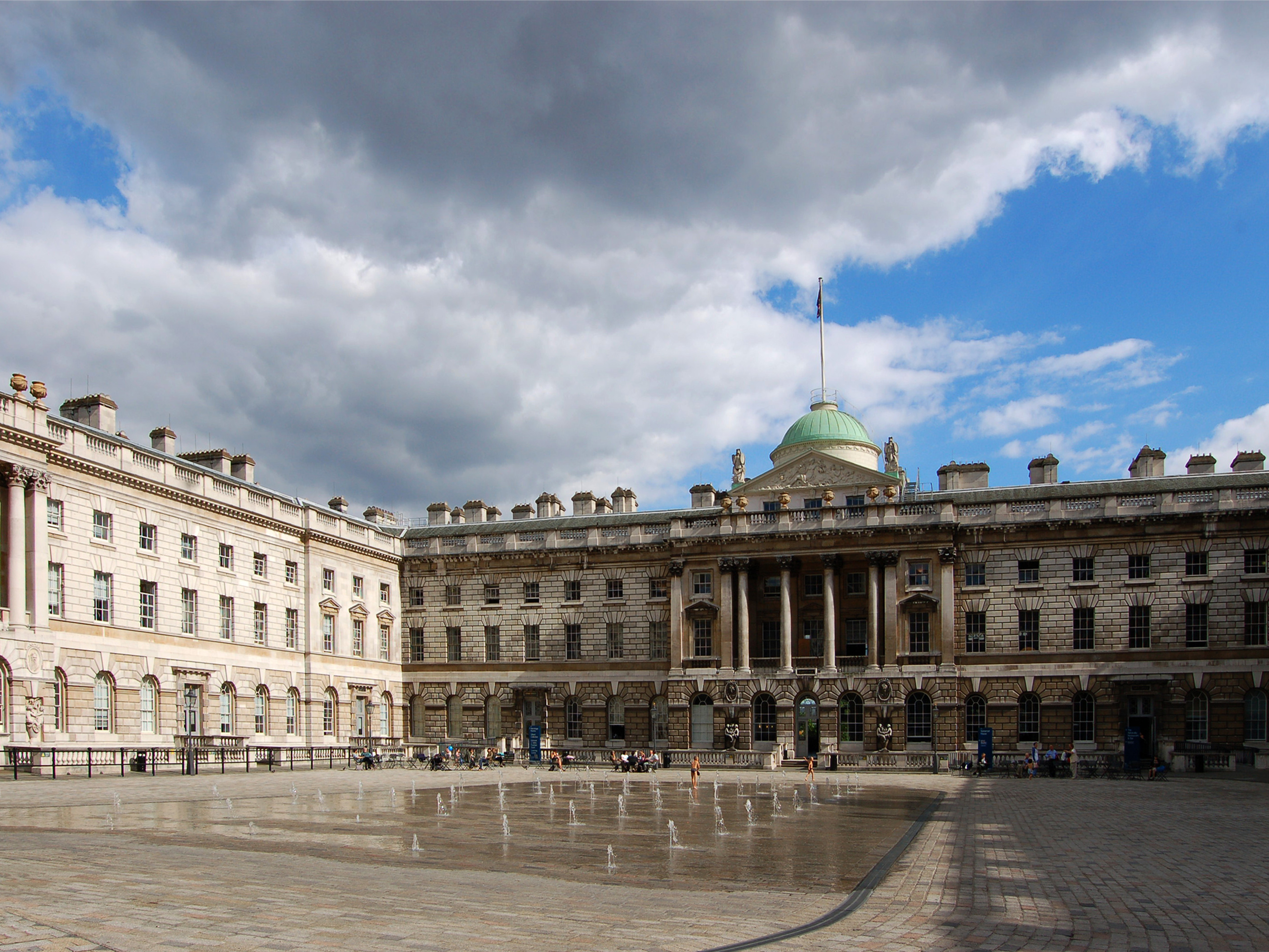
- HQ at Somerset House
- Abbreviation: RSL
- Formation: 1820; 206 years ago
- Type: Learned society
- Headquarters: Somerset House, London, England, United Kingdom
- President: Elif Shafak
- Patron: Queen Camilla
- Website: rsliterature.org

The Royal Society of Literature (RSL) is a learned society founded in 1820 by King George IV to "reward literary merit and excite literary talent". A charity that represents the voice of literature in the UK, the RSL has about 800 Fellows, elected from among the best writers in any genre currently at work. Additionally, Honorary Fellows are chosen from those who have made a significant contribution to the advancement of literature, including publishers, agents, librarians, booksellers or producers. The society is a cultural tenant at London's Somerset House. The RSL is an independent charity and relies on the support of its Members, Patrons, Fellows and friends to continue its work.

== History ==
The Royal Society of Literature (RSL) was founded in 1820, with the patronage of George IV, to "reward literary merit and excite literary talent", and its first president was Thomas Burgess, Bishop of St David's (who was later translated as Bishop of Salisbury). From the beginning of the 21st century, Presidents have served four-year terms and the RSL has employed a professional director to oversee its membership and outreach programmes. From 2018, the RSL's patron has been Queen Camilla, who took over in the role from Queen Elizabeth II.

=== Fellowship ===
Official seal

Fellows of the Royal Society of Literature: are elected annually and accorded the privilege of using the post-nominal letters FRSL. Traditionally, around 14 new fellows per year were elected, with a total number of about 500 being maintained. To be nominated for fellowship, a writer must have published two works of literary merit, and nominations must be seconded by an RSL fellow. All nominations are presented to members of the Council of the Royal Society of Literature, who vote biannually to elect new fellows. Newly elected fellows are introduced at the Society's annual general meeting and summer party. While the President reads a citation for each, they are invited to sign their names in the roll book which dates back to 1820, Additionally, Honorary Fellows are chosen from those who have made a significant contribution to the advancement of literature, including publishers, agents, librarians, booksellers or producers, or who have rendered special service to the RSL. An example of an Honorary Fellow is Sarah Hosking (arts administrator) who set up the Hosking Houses Trust in order to provide a quiet space with financial uplift for mature and overworked women writers.

Past fellows include Samuel Taylor Coleridge, J. R. R. Tolkien, W. B. Yeats, Rudyard Kipling, Thomas Hardy, George Bernard Shaw, Arthur Koestler, Chinua Achebe, Ruth Prawer Jhabvala, Robert Ardrey, Sybille Bedford, Muriel Spark, P. J. Kavanagh, Hilary Mantel, and Sir Roger Scruton. Present Fellows include Margaret Atwood, Bernardine Evaristo, David Hare, Kazuo Ishiguro, Andrew Motion, Paul Muldoon, Zadie Smith, Nadeem Aslam, Sarah Waters, J. K. Rowling, and Nick Cave. A newly created fellow inscribes his or her name on the society's official roll using either Byron's pen, T. S. Eliot's fountain pen, which replaced Dickens's quill in 2013, or (as of 2018) George Eliot's pen, with pens belonging to Jean Rhys and Andrea Levy being additional choices from 2020.

In 2018, the RSL launched the initiative "40 Under 40", which saw the election of 40 new fellows aged under 40. In 2020, the RSL celebrated its 200th anniversary with the announcement of RSL 200, "a five-year festival launched with a series of major new initiatives and 60 new appointments championing the great diversity of writing and writers in the UK". Initiatives included RSL Open (electing new Fellows from communities, backgrounds and experiences currently under-represented in UK literary culture), and RSL International Writers (recognising the contribution of writers across the globe to literature in English). RSL 200 resulted in more than 60 new fellows and honorary fellows being elected annually between 2021 and 2024. There are now more than 800 FRSLs.

From 2023, the RSL began to be criticized over the new diversity of fellowship and for not taking a strong enough stance about the stabbing of Salman Rushdie and the cancellation of Kate Clanchy. In February 2024, President Bernardine Evaristo defended the RSL in The Guardian over the changes to fellowship and issues of freedom of speech, and stated that the RSL "cannot take sides in writers' controversies and issues, but must remain impartial." In reply, Rushdie commented on X: "Just wondering if the Royal Society of Literature is 'impartial' about attempted murder?" In response to this, Evaristo posted evidence of her support of Rushdie when he was stabbed on X which was published at the time in the Independent newspaper. Publication of the RSL's annual magazine was delayed in connection with an article mentioning Israel. In February 2024, the RSL referred itself to the Charity Commission in response to what it described as a "sustained campaign of misinformation being made against it".

In January 2025, Director Molly Rosenberg and Chair Daljit Nagra stepped down from their positions, and, following an annual general meeting, it was announced that the RSL would be implementing a governance review under the new leadership of Ruth Scurr.

=== Publications ===
The society publishes an annual magazine, the RSL Review, which includes features, interviews and essays.

In 2000, the RSL published a volume that provides a description and history of the society, written by one of its fellows, Isabel Quigly.

=== Membership ===
From 2012, the RSL established a membership programme offering a variety of events to members and the general public. Membership of the RSL is open to all.

=== Outreach ===
In 2021, the RSL launched "Literature Matters: Reading Together", a project aiming to make recreational reading accessible to young people across the UK.

== Awards and prizes ==
Through its prize programmes, the RSL supports new and established contemporary writers.

- The RSL Christopher Bland Prize – £10,000 for debut prose writers aged 50 or over.
- The Encore Awards – £10,000 for best second novel of the year. The RSL took over the administration of this award in 2016.
- The RSL Giles St Aubyn Awards for Non-Fiction – annual awards, currently one of £10,000 and one of £5,000 and one of £2,500, to authors engaged on their first commissioned works of non-fiction (replaced the Jerwood Award in 2017).
- The RSL Ondaatje Prize – an annual award of £10,000 for a distinguished work of fiction, non-fiction or poetry, evoking the spirit of a place.
- The V. S. Pritchett Memorial Prize – an annual prize of £1,000 for the best unpublished short story of the year.
- The Benson Medal – awarded to those who have done sustained and outstanding service to literature.
- The RSL Literature Matters Awards for projects which connect with audiences or topics outside the usual reach of literature.
- Sky Arts RSL Writers Awards awarded to British writers of colour at the beginnings of their careers.
- Entente Littéraire Prize for writing and translation from France and the UK. Two books, one English and one French, receive a prize of €8,000 shared between the author and the translator.
- Companion of Literature – the highest honour that the society can bestow upon a writer; inaugurated in 1961, it is held by up to 12 writers at any one time.
- The RSL Pioneer Award, founded in 2025 by Bernardine Evaristo, to honour female writers over 60 years of age who have been pioneers in their field.

== Council and presidents ==
The Council of the Royal Society of Literature is central to the election of new fellows, and directs the RSL's activities through its monthly meetings. Council members serve for a fixed term of four years, with new members being elected by Council when members retire.

Patron
Queen Camilla

President
Elif Shafak

Presidents Emeriti
Michael Holroyd
Colin Thubron
Marina Warner
Bernardine Evaristo

Acting Chair of Council
Ruth Scurr

Vice-presidents

Lisa Appignanesi
Simon Armitage
Mary Beard
Maureen Duffy
Maggie Gee
Victoria Glendinning
Jackie Kay
Blake Morrison
Grace Nichols
Philip Pullman
Elif Shafak
Kamila Shamsie
Colm Tóibín
Claire Tomalin
Jenny Uglow

Council

Louise Doughty
Inua Ellams
Maureen Freely
Daisy Hay
Catherine Johnson
Joanna Kavenna
Helen Mort
Susheila Nasta
Patrick McGuinness
Roger Robinson
Ruth Scurr

== List of presidents ==
- 1820–1832: Bishop Thomas Burgess
- 1832–1833: George Agar-Ellis, 1st Baron Dover
- 1834–1845: F. J. Robinson, 1st Viscount Goderich
- 1845–1849: Henry Hallam
- 1849–1851: Spencer Compton, 2nd Marquess of Northampton
- 1851–1856: George Howard, 7th Earl of Carlisle
- 1856–1876: The Rt Rev. Connop Thirlwall (Bishop of St David's until 1874)
- 1876–1884: The Prince Leopold (Duke of Albany from 1881)
- 1885–1893: Sir Patrick Colquhoun
- 1893–1920: Hardinge Giffard, 1st Earl of Halsbury
- 1921–1945: Robert Crewe-Milnes, 1st Marquess of Crewe
- 1946–1947: Victor Bulwer-Lytton, 2nd Earl of Lytton
- 1947–1982: Lord Butler of Saffron Walden
- 1982–1988: Sir Angus Wilson
- 1988–2003: Roy Jenkins
- 2003–2008: Sir Michael Holroyd
- 2008–2017: Colin Thubron
- 2017–2021: Dame Marina Warner
- 2021–2025: Bernardine Evaristo
- 2025–present: Elif Shafak

=== Current fellows ===
The current list of approximately 800 fellows:
Fellow	Year of election
Hassan Abdulrazzak	2024
*Julia Abel Smith	2008
Leila Aboulela	2023
*Melanie Abrahams	2020
Peter Ackroyd	1984
Sulaiman Addonia	2022
Diran Adebayo	2006
Mojisola Adebayo	2018
John Agard	2007
*Sandra Agard	2022
Bola Agbaje	2018
Patience Agbabi	2017
Arifa Akbar	2026
Hanan al-Shaykh	2019
*Clare Alexander	2021
Monica Ali	2019
Yasmin Alibhai-Brown	2022
Keith Alldritt	1978
*Ellah Wakatama Allfrey	2019
David Almond	2011
*David Altaras	1996
Karin Altenberg	2023
Moniza Alvi	2023
Mark Amory	1996
Tahmima Anam	2017
Anthony Anaxagorou	2023
*Linda Anderson	2020
*Adjoa Andoh	2022
*Nelle Andrew	2023
Carole Angier	2002
Romalyn Ante	2023
Raymond Antrobus	2020
Kwame Anthony Appiah	2017
Lisa Appignanesi, Vice-president	2015
Anne Applebaum	2021
Michael Arditti	2022
*Sarah Ardizzone	2024
Chloe Aridjis	2020
Simon Armitage, Vice-president	2004
Claire Armitstead	2022
Karen Armstrong	2005
Jake Arnott	2026
Mona Arshi	2022
Michael Asher	1996
Rosemary Ashton	1999
Zawe Ashton	2021
Jenn Ashworth	2018
Nadeem Aslam	2010
*Syima Aslam	2019
*Lucy Astor	2024
Polly Atkin	2022
Kate Atkinson	2010
Margaret Atwood	2010
Tash Aw	2023
Sir Alan Ayckbourn	1991
*Pete Ayrton	2019
David Baddiel	2019
Paul Bailey	1999
*Bibi Bakare-Yusuf	2019
*Mohit Bakaya	2023
Sarah Bakewell	2012
John Banville	2007
Richard Barber	1971
Juliet Barker	2001
Pat Barker	1995
Damian Barr	2020
Sebastian Barry	2009
Susan Bassnett	2007
*Sanchita Basu De Sarkar	2024
Sir Jonathan Bate	2004
Laura Bates	2018
Martin Bax	2002
Sally Bayley	2021
Dame Mary Beard, Vice-president	2019
Dame Gillian Beer	2006
Sir Antony Beevor	1999
*Sharmilla Beezmohun	2019
Rosalind Belben	1999
Jay Bernard	2018
Emily Berry	2018
*Richard Beswick	2023
Homi Bhabha	2021
Joanna Biggs	2026
*Xandra Bingley	2019
*Robert Binyon	2000
Dinah Birch	2026
Dea Birkett	2000
Julia Blackburn	2002
Terence Blacker	2017
Malorie Blackman	2009
Sir Quentin Blake	2013
Rachael Boast	2022
Leo Boix	2026
*Ruth Borthwick	2018
Elleke Boehmer	2019
Malika Booker	2022
*Mair Bosworth	2020
William Boyd	1982
Susie Boyt	2022
Tony Bradman	2024
Melvyn Bragg	1971
Carys Bray	2023
Piers Brendon	2010
Howard Brenton	2017
Simon Brett	2015
Robin Briggs	1999
*Jenny Brown	2021
*Tony Brown	2020
Alan Brownjohn	1999
James Buchan	2001
Rowan Hisayo Buchanan	2023
Moira Buffini	2014
Melvin Burgess	2022
Anna Burns	2021
John Burnside	1999
*Paul Burston	2026
*Margaret Busby	2017
Jez Butterworth	2019
David Cairns	2001
Lucy Caldwell	2018
James Campbell	2026
Sir David Cannadine	1999
Vahni Capildeo	2019
Peter Carey	1989
Ciaran Carson	2014
Jan Carson	2023
Miranda Carter	2011
Helen Castor	2017
David Caute	1998
Nick Cave	2022
Hugh Cecil	1997
Aidan Chambers	2009
*Charles III	2002
Debjani Chatterjee	2019
Amit Chaudhuri	2009
Tracy Chevalier	2008
Lauren Child	2026
Kayo Chingonyi	2022
Anne Chisholm, Vice-president	1989
Rupert Christiansen	1997
Kate Clanchy	2010
Susannah Clapp	2013
Gillian Clarke	2000
John Clay	1998
*Frances Coady	2024
*Michael Codron	2019
Jonathan Coe	2012
Michaela Coel	2022
Joseph Coelho	2023
J. M. Coetzee	1988
Josh Cohen	2023
Richard Cohen	2017
*Gill Coleridge	2021
Linda Colley (Lady Cannadine)	2004
*Geraldine Collinge	2024
Sophie Collins	2018
Cressida Connolly	2020
Tony Connor	1972
P. J. Conrad	1974
Peter Conradi	2010
David Constantine	2007
*Jon Cook	2021
Artemis Cooper (Lady Beevor)	2016
Susan Cooper	2020
Wendy Cope	1992
John Cornwell	1985
Frank Cottrell Boyce	2012
Cressida Cowell	2021
Jim Crace	1999
Robert Crawford	2021
Jacqueline Crooks	2024
Kevin Crossley-Holland	1998
Patricia Cumper	2023
*James Currey	2023
Tony Curtis	2000
Rachel Cusk	2012
Emma Dabiri	2023
David Dabydeen	2000
Fred D'Aguiar	2022
William Dalrymple	1995
Richard Davenport-Hines	2003
Andrew Davies	1996
Carys Davies	2022
Norman Davies	2013
Paul Davies	1999
Russell T. Davies	2022
Stevie Davies	1998
Dick Davis	1981
Richard Dawkins	1997
Jill Dawson	2020
Elizabeth Day	2024
April De Angelis	2020
Louis de Bernières	2006
Margreta de Grazia	2021
Alain de Botton	2011
*Tim Dee	2017
Ferdinand Dennis	2022
Edmund de Waal	2021
Kit de Waal	2022
Anita Desai	1978
Imtiaz Dharker	2010
David Dilks	1986
*Elise Dillsworth	2026
Maura Dooley	2006
Tishani Doshi	2023
*Jonathan Douglas	2021
Robert Douglas-Fairhurst	2015
Roddy Doyle	2003
Dame Margaret Drabble	1973
Jane Draycott	2020
Dame Carol Ann Duffy	1999
Sasha Dugdale	2020
Ian Duhig	2006
Sarah Dunant	2024
Patricia Duncker	2026
Douglas Dunn	1981
Jane Dunn	1999
Nell Dunn	2004
Geoff Dyer	2005
Will Eaves	2021
Reni Eddo-Lodge	2021
David Edgar	1985
Helen Edmundson	2015
Yvvette Edwards	2020
Max Egremont (Lord Egremont)	2001
Menna Elfyn	2015
Inua Ellams	2018
Anne Enright	2010
Wendy Erskine	2023
Diana Evans	2020
Martina Evans	2024
Sir Richard Evans	1999
Bernardine Evaristo, President emeritus	2004
Sir Richard Eyre	2011
Jenni Fagan	2023
Ruth Fainlight	2007
Duncan Fallowell	2015
Kit Fan	2022
Paul Farley	2012
Sebastian Faulks	1994
Lara Feigel	2018
James Fenton	1983
Adam Fergusson	2009
Maggie Fergusson	2007
William Fiennes	2009
Orlando Figes	2003
Anne Fine	2003
Tibor Fischer	2003
Leontia Flynn	2022
Richard Ford	2012
Aminatta Forna	2012
Richard Fortey	2009
Roy Foster	1992
Adam Foulds	2009
Linda France	2024
Gavin Francis	2023
*Dan Franklin	2019
Peter Frankopan	2020
Lady Antonia Fraser	2003
Robert Fraser	2007
Michael Frayn	1969
Maureen Freely	2012
Annie Freud	2024
Esther Freud	2019
Stephen Fry	2019
John Fuller	1980
Neil Gaiman	2018
Patrick Gale	2021
Janice Galloway	2023
Jane Gardam	2005
*Anthony Gardner	2004
Philip Gardner	1986
Rosie Garland	2023
Alan Garner	2011
Timothy Garton Ash	2005
Jamila Gavin	2015
*Kate Gavron	2020
Gabriel Gbadamosi	2024
Maggie Gee, Vice-president	1994
*Sue Gee	2024
Adèle Geras	2013
Amitav Ghosh	2009
Peter Gill	2019
Sir David Gilmour, 4th Baronet	1990
Paul Gilroy	2016
Lesley Glaister	1994
Victoria Glendinning, Vice-president	1982
Salena Godden	2020
*David Godwin	2020
*Georgina Godwin	2023
Vesna Goldsworthy	2021
*Lennie Goodings	2020
Priyamvada Gopal	2024
Edmund Gordon	2018
Lyndall Gordon	2002
Warwick Gould	1997
James Graham	2018
Colin Grant	2020
Linda Grant	2013
*Victoria Gray	2021
Anthony Grayling	2006
Lavinia Greenlaw	2004
Bonnie Greer	2022
Germaine Greer	2016
John Gribbin	1999
*Chris Gribble	2023
Niall Griffiths	2022
Vona Groarke	2024
Guy Gunaratne	2024
Romesh Gunesekera	2004
Kirsty Gunn	2020
Xiaolu Guo	2022
Sunetra Gupta	2024
Tanika Gupta	2016
Abdulrazak Gurnah	2006
Jen Hadfield	2021
Tessa Hadley	2009
John Haffenden	1986
William Hague (Lord Hague)	2009
Daniel Hahn	2020
Sarah Hall	2016
John Halperin	1985
James Hamilton-Paterson	2023
Sir Christopher Hampton	1976
*Lucy Hannah	2024
Sophie Hannah	2024
Sir David Hare	1985
Kiran Millwood Hargrave	2023
Claire Harman	2006
Richard Harries (Lord Harries of Pentregarth)	1996
Alexandra Harris	2013
Joanne Harris	2022
Robert Harris	1996
Melissa Harrison	2026
David Harsent	1999
Rosalind Harvey	2018
Sir Max Hastings	1996
Lady Selina Hastings	1994
Roy Hattersley (Lord Hattersley)	2003
Daisy Hay	2018
Cameron Hazlehurst	1973
John Hemming CG	2013
Philip Hensher	1998
W. N. Herbert	2015
Mick Herron	2024
Sophie Herxheimer	2026
*Mark C. Hewitt	2023
Rachel Hewitt	2018
Seán Hewitt	2023
Katie Hickman	2026
Ella Hickson	2018
Rosemary Hill	2010
Tobias Hill	2011
Bevis Hillier	1997
Afua Hirsch	2024
Victoria Hislop	2024
Henry Hitchings	2015
Peter Hobbs	2014
*Ted Hodgkinson	2026
Eva Hoffman	2007
Michael Hofmann	2023
*Andrew Holgate	2020
Tom Holland	2016
Alan Hollinghurst	1995
*Richard Hollis	2019
Richard Holmes	1975
Sir Michael Holroyd President Emeritus	1968
Jeremy Hooker	2021
Christopher Hope	1990
Nick Hornby	1996
*Sarah Hosking	2021
Sarah Howe	2018
Kerry Hudson	2020
Kathryn Hughes	2006
*Peggy Hughes	2023
Lucy Hughes-Hallett	2010
Roland Huntford	2001
Aamer Hussein	2004
Angela Huth	1978
*Sir Nicholas Hytner	2019
Armando Iannucci	2019
Khadijah Ibrahiim	2024
Robert Icke	2018
Robert Irwin	2001
Kazuo Ishiguro	1989
Howard Jacobson	2012
Maya Jaggi	2023
Kathleen Jamie	2009
Deborah Jay	2005
Alan Jenkins	2002
Sir Simon Jenkins	2003
Liz Jensen	2005
Catherine Johnson	2019
Linton Kwesi Johnson	2013
*Paula Johnson	2008
Jennifer Johnston	2009
Cynan Jones	2019
Steve Jones	2011
Anjali Joseph	2024
Anthony Joseph	2023
Gabriel Josipovici	1997
Alan Judd	1990
Margaret Jull Costa	2013
Meena Kandasamy	2022
Bhanu Kapil	2022
Kapka Kassabova	2026
Joanna Kavenna	2024
Jackie Kay, Vice-president	2002
Jonathan Keates	1992
Laurence Kelly	2003
Stuart Kelly	2026
Peter Kemp	2015
Thomas Keneally	1973
A. L. Kennedy	1999
*Prince Edward, Duke of Kent	1978
Hannah Khalil	2022
Mimi Khalvati	2009
Andrew Kidd	2023
Lucy Kirkwood	2018
Matthew Kneale	2003
Zaffar Kunial	2022
Hari Kunzru	2014
Hanif Kureishi	2008
Kwame Kwei-Armah	2014
David Kynaston	2010
Olivia Laing	2019
Nick Laird	2013
John Lanchester	2002
Robin Lane Fox	1974
Lee Langley	1996
James Lasdun	2009
Bryony Lavery	2002
Patrice Lawrence	2023
Mark Lawson	2015
Nigella Lawson	2026
Zachary Leader	2007
Dame Hermione Lee	1992
Brendan Lehane	1999
Mike Leigh	2008
Rebecca Lenkiewicz	2017
Deborah Levy	2017
Paul Levy	1980
Gwyneth Lewis	1999
Roger Lewis	2026
Tim Liardet	2026
Alison Light	2021
Joanne Limburg	2022
Toby Litt	2023
Dame Penelope Lively	1985
Samuel Lock	2001
*Sharmaine Lovegrove	2021
Hannah Lowe	2022
Andrew Lycett	2010
Richard Mabey	2011
Alexander McCall Smith	2014
Karen McCarthy Woolf	2022
Geraldine McCaughrean	2009
*Caroline McCormick	2026
Val McDermid	2016
Ian McEwan CBE	1983
Robert Macfarlane	2011
Roy McFarlane	2023
Darren McGarvey	2023
Lisa McGee	2022
Roger McGough	2004
Patrick McGrath	2002
Patrick McGuinness	2019
Jamie McKendrick	2014
Andrew McMillan	2020
Ian McMillan	2022
*Jean McNicol	2024
Ben Macintyre	2014
Shena Mackay	1999
Rory MacLean	2007
*Christopher MacLehose	2021
Margaret MacMillan	2003
Tessa McWatt	2021
Candia McWilliam	1994
Sabrina Mahfouz	2018
*Claire Malcolm	2024
Sir Noel Malcolm	1997
Nesrine Malik	2023
David Malouf	2008
Norman Manea	2011
Alberto Manguel	2010
Philip Mansel	2010
Sarah Ladipo Manyika	2023
Patrick Marber	2002
Patrick Marnham	1988
Justin Marozzi	2021
*Robyn Marsack	2023
Philip Marsden	1996
Rosalind Marshall	1974
Adam Mars-Jones	2007
Yann Martel	2014
Francesca Martinez	2022
Hisham Matar	2013
Douglas Matthews	1998
Glyn Maxwell	1999
*Shirley May	2020
Jonathan Meades	2019
James Meek	2020
Gita Mehta	2021
Pauline Melville	2018
Edward Mendelson	2003
Jeffrey Meyers	1983
China Miéville	2015
Andrew Miller	2012
Kei Miller	2018
Michael Millgate	1983
Pankaj Mishra	2008
Rohinton Mistry	2009
David Mitchell	2013
Julian Mitchell	1985
Deborah Moggach	1999
Nadifa Mohamed	2018
Ray Monk	2015
Caroline Moorehead	1993
David Morley	2018
Sir Michael Morpurgo	2004
Sinéad Morrissey	2019
Blake Morrison, Vice-president	1988
Helen Mort	2018
Sarah Moss	2019
Kate Mosse	2020
Sir Andrew Motion	1984
Sir Ferdinand Mount	1991
Fiona Mozley	2022
Ankhi Mukherjee	2026
Paul Muldoon	1981
*Henderson Mullin	2023
Raman Mundair	2022
Alice Munro	2002
Richard Murphy	1968
Benjamin Myers	2023
Daljit Nagra	2017
Beverley Naidoo	2023
Suniti Namjoshi	2023
*Susheila Nasta	2019
Patrick Ness	2023
Charles Nicholl	2005
Grace Nichols, Vice-president	2007
Virginia Nicholson	2019
William Nicholson	1999
Adam Nicolson (Lord Carnock)	2005
*Alastair Niven	2021
Gerard Noel	1999
Barney Norris	2018
Okechukwu Nzelu	2024
Edna O'Brien	2011
Sean O'Brien	2007
Bernard O'Donoghue	1999
Maggie O'Farrell	2021
Andrew O'Hagan	2010
Redmond O'Hanlon	1993
Kaite O'Reilly	2023
Irenosen Okojie	2018
Ben Okri	1997
Musa Okwonga	2022
David Olusoga	2019
*Sir Christopher Ondaatje	2003
Michael Ondaatje	2012
Chibundu Onuzo	2018
Susie Orbach	2019
*Deirdre Osborne	2022
*Ursula Owen	2020
Helen Oyeyemi	2012
Ruth Padel	1998
*Stephen Page	2019
Sir Michael Palin	2020
*Judith Palmer	2026
Peter Parker	1997
Nii Ayikwei Parkes	2024
Sandeep Parmar	2020
Vinay Patel	2018
Don Paterson	2004
*Emma Paterson	2023
Brian Patten	2003
Glenn Patterson	2023
*Polly Pattullo	2022
Laline Paull	2023
Tim Pears	2012
Sarah Perry	2018
Pascale Petit	2018
*Ruthie Petrie	2021
Adam Phillips	2012
Caryl Phillips	2000
Mike Phillips	2000
Winsome Pinnock	2020
David Plante	2002
Clare Pollard	2024
Jacob Polley	2024
Stephen Poliakoff	1985
Peter Pomerantsev	2021
Max Porter	2020
Lucy Prebble	2018
*Alexandra Pringle	2017
*Stuart Profitt	2019
(Baron) David Profumo	1995
*Simon Prosser	2021
Kate Pullinger	2024
Philip Pullman, Vice-president	2001
Craig Raine	1984
Nina Raine	2019
Ross Raisin	2018
Ian Rankin	2016
Nicholas Rankin	2009
Frederic Raphael	1964
Sigrid Rausing	2020
Piers Paul Read	1972
Anne Redmon	1980
Deryn Rees-Jones	2024
Christopher Reid	1999
*Emma Rice	2024
Sir Christopher Ricks	1970
Chris Riddell	2026
Jane Ridley	2007
Matthew White Ridley, 5th Viscount Ridley	1999
Denise Riley	2019
Gwendoline Riley	2018
William Rivière	2000
Graham Robb	1999
Andrew Roberts	2001
Michèle Roberts	1999
*Sue Roberts	2023
Robin Robertson	2010
Roger Robinson	2020
*Fiammetta Rocco	2021
Claudia Roden	2026
Monique Roffey	2022
Jane Rogers	1994
Stephen Romer	2011
Jacqueline Rose	2022
Michael Rosen	2006
Meg Rosoff	2013
Jacob Ross	2006
Leone Ross	2023
J. K. Rowling	2002
Anthony Rudolf	2005
David Runciman (Viscount Runciman of Doxford)	2021
Katherine Rundell	2020
Sir Salman Rushdie	1983
Frances Ryan	2022
Amy Sackville	2018
Sunjeev Sahota	2018
S. F. Said	2021
Lawrence Sail	1998
Edward St Aubyn	2011
*Marina Salandy-Brown	2020
Fiona Sampson	2010
*Sarah Sanders	2020
Philippe Sands	2020
Sathnam Sanghera	2016
Sir Simon Schama	2016
*Aki Schilz	2023
Ann Schlee	1997
Michael Schmidt	1993
*Patricia Schute	1991
Lawrence Scott	2019
Richard Scott	2024
Ruth Scurr	2015
Simon Sebag-Montefiore	2003
Anne Sebba	2021
Elisa Segrave	2001
Richard Sennett	1999
*Kadija Sesay	2021
Vikram Seth	1994
Miranda Seymour	1996
Elif Shafak, President	2019
Nicholas Shakespeare	1999
Kamila Shamsie, Vice-president	2011
Jo Shapcott	1999
Owen Sheers	2023
Warsan Shire	2018
Lola Shoneyin	2026
Elaine Showalter	2011
Nikesh Shukla	2019
*William Sieghart	2019
Posy Simmonds	2004
Helen Simpson	1996
Iain Sinclair	2009
Sunny Singh	2023
Adam Sisman	2015
Lemn Sissay	2022
Gillian Slovo	2013
Dorothea Smartt	2019
Ali Smith	2007
Cherry Smyth	2022
Deborah Smith	2018
*John Saumarez Smith, Benson Medallist	1996
Zadie Smith	2002
*Nicola Solomon	2019
Ahdaf Soueif	2002
Diana Souhami	2024
*Wole Soyinka	1983
Frances Spalding	1984
*Nicholas Spice	2019
Jean Sprackland	2021
Francis Spufford	2007
*Alice Spawls	2024
Hilary Spurling	2005
Sir John Spurling	2010
Martin Stannard	1999
C. K. Stead	1995
Polly Stenham	2018
Nell Stevens	2026
Rory Stewart	2009
Stanley Stewart	2001
Peter Stothard	2023
Rebecca Stott	2021
Sir Roy Strong	1999
Andrea Stuart	2014
*SuAndi	2024
Kate Summerscale	2010
*Tom Sutcliffe	2020
John Sutherland	1990
*David Sutton	2012
*Bill Swainson	2023
Graham Swift	1984
Charlie Swinbourne	2022
Meera Syal	2017
Michael Symmons Roberts	2014
George Szirtes	1982
Bryan Talbot	2018
Preti Taneja	2023
D. J. Taylor	1997
Joelle Taylor	2022
Sara Taylor	2018
Kae Tempest	2015
Philip Terry	2026
Adam Thirlwell	2018
Dame Emma Thompson	2021
Tade Thompson	2023
Ian Thomson	2003
Rupert Thomson	2015
Jack Thorne	2020
Colin Thubron President	1969
Ann Thwaite	1987
Stella Tillyard	2019
Colm Tóibín, Vice-president	2007
(Count) Nikolai Tolstoy	1979
Claire Tomalin, Vice-president	1976
*Boyd Tonkin	2020
Barbara Trapido	2011
Jeremy Treglown	1989
Dame Rose Tremain	1983
Lynne Truss	2004
Jenny Uglow, Vice-president	1998
* Reza Vishkai	2026
*Amy Wack	2024
Erica Wagner	2023
James Walvin	2006
Alan Warner	2013
Dame Marina Warner	1984
Sarah Waters	2009
Robert Wells	1994
Stanley Wells	2013
Timberlake Wertenbaker	1999
Sara Wheeler	1999
*Sylvia Whitman	2023
Helen Wilcox	1999
Verna Wilkins	2021
Eley Williams	2018
Hugo Williams	1988
Nigel Williams	1994
Lord Williams of Oystermouth	2003
*Mary-Kay Wilmers	2017
A. N. Wilson	1982
Bee Wilson	2023
Frances Wilson	2008
Dame Jacqueline Wilson	2005
Jeanette Winterson	2016
*Gaby Wood	2021
James Wood	2011
Michael Wood	1992
Gerard Woodward	2005
Pamela Woof	1999
Kit Wright	1997
Ann Wroe	2007
Evie Wyld	2018
*Lola Young, Baroness Young of Hornsey	2020
Louisa Young	2024
Gary Younge	2021
Adam Zamoyski	2006
Theodore Zeldin	1999

The * before the name denotes an Honorary Fellow. The list is online at the RSL website.

=== RSL International Writers ===
The RSL International Writers programme is a new life-long honour and award recognizing the contribution of writers across the globe to literature in English, and the power of literature to transcend borders in bringing people together, the inaugural list of recipients being announced in 2021.

Year	Writer	Country	Language(s)	Genre(s)	Panel of Nominators
2021	Don Mee Choi (1962–)	South Korea; United States	Korean and English	poetry, translation	Chair: Daniel Hahn; Members: Lisa Appignanesi; Syima Aslam; Bibi Bakare-Yusuf; Sophie Collins; Sasha Dugdale; Max Porter; Philippe Sands; Elif Shafak; Boyd Tonkin
2021	Annie Ernaux (1940–)	France	French	novel, memoirs, autobiography	Chair: Daniel Hahn; Members: Lisa Appignanesi; Syima Aslam; Bibi Bakare-Yusuf; Sophie Collins; Sasha Dugdale; Max Porter; Philippe Sands; Elif Shafak; Boyd Tonkin
2021	David Grossman (1954–)	Israel	Hebrew	novel, essays	Chair: Daniel Hahn; Members: Lisa Appignanesi; Syima Aslam; Bibi Bakare-Yusuf; Sophie Collins; Sasha Dugdale; Max Porter; Philippe Sands; Elif Shafak; Boyd Tonkin
2021	Jamaica Kincaid (1949–)	Antigua and Barbuda; United States	English	novel, essays, short story	Chair: Daniel Hahn; Members: Lisa Appignanesi; Syima Aslam; Bibi Bakare-Yusuf; Sophie Collins; Sasha Dugdale; Max Porter; Philippe Sands; Elif Shafak; Boyd Tonkin
2021	Yan Lianke (1958–)	China	Mandarin	novel, short story	Chair: Daniel Hahn; Members: Lisa Appignanesi; Syima Aslam; Bibi Bakare-Yusuf; Sophie Collins; Sasha Dugdale; Max Porter; Philippe Sands; Elif Shafak; Boyd Tonkin
2021	Amin Maalouf (1949–)	Lebanon; France	French	novel, essays	Chair: Daniel Hahn; Members: Lisa Appignanesi; Syima Aslam; Bibi Bakare-Yusuf; Sophie Collins; Sasha Dugdale; Max Porter; Philippe Sands; Elif Shafak; Boyd Tonkin
2021	Alain Mabanckou (1966–)	Republic of Congo; France	French	novel, poetry, essays	Chair: Daniel Hahn; Members: Lisa Appignanesi; Syima Aslam; Bibi Bakare-Yusuf; Sophie Collins; Sasha Dugdale; Max Porter; Philippe Sands; Elif Shafak; Boyd Tonkin
2021	Javier Marías (1951–2022)	Spain	Spanish	novel, short story, essays, translation	Chair: Daniel Hahn; Members: Lisa Appignanesi; Syima Aslam; Bibi Bakare-Yusuf; Sophie Collins; Sasha Dugdale; Max Porter; Philippe Sands; Elif Shafak; Boyd Tonkin
2021	Ngũgĩ wa Thiong'o (1938–2025)	Kenya	English and Kikuyu	novel, drama, short story, essays	Chair: Daniel Hahn; Members: Lisa Appignanesi; Syima Aslam; Bibi Bakare-Yusuf; Sophie Collins; Sasha Dugdale; Max Porter; Philippe Sands; Elif Shafak; Boyd Tonkin
2021	Claudia Rankine (1963–)	United States	English	poetry, essays, drama	Chair: Daniel Hahn; Members: Lisa Appignanesi; Syima Aslam; Bibi Bakare-Yusuf; Sophie Collins; Sasha Dugdale; Max Porter; Philippe Sands; Elif Shafak; Boyd Tonkin
2021	Olga Tokarczuk (1962–)	Poland	Polish	novel, short story, poetry, essay, screenplay	Chair: Daniel Hahn; Members: Lisa Appignanesi; Syima Aslam; Bibi Bakare-Yusuf; Sophie Collins; Sasha Dugdale; Max Porter; Philippe Sands; Elif Shafak; Boyd Tonkin
2021	Dubravka Ugrešić (1949–2023)	Croatia	Croatian	novel, essays	Chair: Daniel Hahn; Members: Lisa Appignanesi; Syima Aslam; Bibi Bakare-Yusuf; Sophie Collins; Sasha Dugdale; Max Porter; Philippe Sands; Elif Shafak; Boyd Tonkin
2022	Anne Carson (1950–)	Canada	English	poetry, essays	Chair: Daniel Hahn; Members: Mojisola Adebayo; Nick Barley; Sharmilla Beezmohun; Maureen Freely; Nell Leyshon; Nadifa Mohamed; Daljit Nagra; Katherine Rundell
2022	Maryse Condé (1937–2024)	France	French	novel, drama, essays	Chair: Daniel Hahn; Members: Mojisola Adebayo; Nick Barley; Sharmilla Beezmohun; Maureen Freely; Nell Leyshon; Nadifa Mohamed; Daljit Nagra; Katherine Rundell
2022	Tsitsi Dangarembga (1959–)	Zimbabwe	English	novel, drama, essays, screenplay	Chair: Daniel Hahn; Members: Mojisola Adebayo; Nick Barley; Sharmilla Beezmohun; Maureen Freely; Nell Leyshon; Nadifa Mohamed; Daljit Nagra; Katherine Rundell
2022	Cornelia Funke (1958–)	Germany	German	novel	Chair: Daniel Hahn; Members: Mojisola Adebayo; Nick Barley; Sharmilla Beezmohun; Maureen Freely; Nell Leyshon; Nadifa Mohamed; Daljit Nagra; Katherine Rundell
2022	Mary Gaitskill (1954–)	United States	English	novel, short story, essays	Chair: Daniel Hahn; Members: Mojisola Adebayo; Nick Barley; Sharmilla Beezmohun; Maureen Freely; Nell Leyshon; Nadifa Mohamed; Daljit Nagra; Katherine Rundell
2022	Faïza Guène (1985–)	France	French	novel	Chair: Daniel Hahn; Members: Mojisola Adebayo; Nick Barley; Sharmilla Beezmohun; Maureen Freely; Nell Leyshon; Nadifa Mohamed; Daljit Nagra; Katherine Rundell
2022	Saidiya Hartman (1960–)	United States	English	essays	Chair: Daniel Hahn; Members: Mojisola Adebayo; Nick Barley; Sharmilla Beezmohun; Maureen Freely; Nell Leyshon; Nadifa Mohamed; Daljit Nagra; Katherine Rundell
2022	Kim Hyesoon (1955–)	South Korea	Korean	poetry, essays	Chair: Daniel Hahn; Members: Mojisola Adebayo; Nick Barley; Sharmilla Beezmohun; Maureen Freely; Nell Leyshon; Nadifa Mohamed; Daljit Nagra; Katherine Rundell
2022	Yōko Ogawa (1962–)	Japan	Japanese	novel, short story, essays	Chair: Daniel Hahn; Members: Mojisola Adebayo; Nick Barley; Sharmilla Beezmohun; Maureen Freely; Nell Leyshon; Nadifa Mohamed; Daljit Nagra; Katherine Rundell
2022	Raja Shehadeh (1951–)	Palestine	Arabic	memoirs, essays	Chair: Daniel Hahn; Members: Mojisola Adebayo; Nick Barley; Sharmilla Beezmohun; Maureen Freely; Nell Leyshon; Nadifa Mohamed; Daljit Nagra; Katherine Rundell
2022	Juan Gabriel Vásquez (1973–)	Colombia	Spanish	novel, short story, essays	Chair: Daniel Hahn; Members: Mojisola Adebayo; Nick Barley; Sharmilla Beezmohun; Maureen Freely; Nell Leyshon; Nadifa Mohamed; Daljit Nagra; Katherine Rundell
2022	Samar Yazbek (1970–)	Syria	Arabic	novel, short story, essays	Chair: Daniel Hahn; Members: Mojisola Adebayo; Nick Barley; Sharmilla Beezmohun; Maureen Freely; Nell Leyshon; Nadifa Mohamed; Daljit Nagra; Katherine Rundell
2023	Tony Birch (1957–)	Australia	English	novel, short story, essays	Chair: Maureen Freely; Members: Sandra Agard; Kit Fan; Daniel Hahn; Margaret Jull Costa; Hannah Khalil; Musa Okwonga; Gaby Wood
2023	Yussef El Guindi (1960–)	Egypt; United States	English	drama	Chair: Maureen Freely; Members: Sandra Agard; Kit Fan; Daniel Hahn; Margaret Jull Costa; Hannah Khalil; Musa Okwonga; Gaby Wood
2023	Lorna Goodison (1947–)	Jamaica	English	poetry, essays, memoirs	Chair: Maureen Freely; Members: Sandra Agard; Kit Fan; Daniel Hahn; Margaret Jull Costa; Hannah Khalil; Musa Okwonga; Gaby Wood
2023	Yaa Gyasi (1989–)	Ghana; United States	English	novel	Chair: Maureen Freely; Members: Sandra Agard; Kit Fan; Daniel Hahn; Margaret Jull Costa; Hannah Khalil; Musa Okwonga; Gaby Wood
2023	Han Kang (1970–)	South Korea	Korean	novel	Chair: Maureen Freely; Members: Sandra Agard; Kit Fan; Daniel Hahn; Margaret Jull Costa; Hannah Khalil; Musa Okwonga; Gaby Wood
2023	Yiyun Li (1972–)	China; United States	English	short story, novel	Chair: Maureen Freely; Members: Sandra Agard; Kit Fan; Daniel Hahn; Margaret Jull Costa; Hannah Khalil; Musa Okwonga; Gaby Wood
2023	Attica Locke (1974–)	United States	English	novel	Chair: Maureen Freely; Members: Sandra Agard; Kit Fan; Daniel Hahn; Margaret Jull Costa; Hannah Khalil; Musa Okwonga; Gaby Wood
2023	Valeria Luiselli (1983–)	Mexico	Spanish and English	essays, novel	Chair: Maureen Freely; Members: Sandra Agard; Kit Fan; Daniel Hahn; Margaret Jull Costa; Hannah Khalil; Musa Okwonga; Gaby Wood
2023	Anne Michaels (1958–)	Canada	English	poetry, novel	Chair: Maureen Freely; Members: Sandra Agard; Kit Fan; Daniel Hahn; Margaret Jull Costa; Hannah Khalil; Musa Okwonga; Gaby Wood
2023	Scholastique Mukasonga (1956–)	Rwanda; France	French	short story, novel	Chair: Maureen Freely; Members: Sandra Agard; Kit Fan; Daniel Hahn; Margaret Jull Costa; Hannah Khalil; Musa Okwonga; Gaby Wood
2023	Maria Stepanova (1972–)	Russia	Russian	poetry, novel, journalism	Chair: Maureen Freely; Members: Sandra Agard; Kit Fan; Daniel Hahn; Margaret Jull Costa; Hannah Khalil; Musa Okwonga; Gaby Wood
2023	Gao Xingjian (1940–)	China; France	Chinese	novel, drama	Chair: Maureen Freely; Members: Sandra Agard; Kit Fan; Daniel Hahn; Margaret Jull Costa; Hannah Khalil; Musa Okwonga; Gaby Wood
2024
2024	Jo Ann Beard (1955–)	United States	English	essays	Chair: Kit Fan; Members: Moniza Alvi; Kwame Anthony Appiah; Chloe Aridjis; Homi K. Bhabha; Margaret Busby; Maureen Freely; Deirdre Osborne; Nathalie Teitler
2024	Nuruddin Farah (1945–)	Somalia	Somali and English	novel, short story, essays, drama	Chair: Kit Fan; Members: Moniza Alvi; Kwame Anthony Appiah; Chloe Aridjis; Homi K. Bhabha; Margaret Busby; Maureen Freely; Deirdre Osborne; Nathalie Teitler
2024	Carolyn Forché (1950–)	United States	English	poetry, essays, translation	Chair: Kit Fan; Members: Moniza Alvi; Kwame Anthony Appiah; Chloe Aridjis; Homi K. Bhabha; Margaret Busby; Maureen Freely; Deirdre Osborne; Nathalie Teitler
2024	Georgi Gospodinov (1956–)	Bulgaria	Bulgarian	novel, poetry, drama	Chair: Kit Fan; Members: Moniza Alvi; Kwame Anthony Appiah; Chloe Aridjis; Homi K. Bhabha; Margaret Busby; Maureen Freely; Deirdre Osborne; Nathalie Teitler
2024	Witi Ihimaera (1944–)	New Zealand	Māori and English	novel, short story, memoirs, drama, essays	Chair: Kit Fan; Members: Moniza Alvi; Kwame Anthony Appiah; Chloe Aridjis; Homi K. Bhabha; Margaret Busby; Maureen Freely; Deirdre Osborne; Nathalie Teitler
2024	Marlon James (1970–)	Jamaica	English and Jamaican Patois	novel	Chair: Kit Fan; Members: Moniza Alvi; Kwame Anthony Appiah; Chloe Aridjis; Homi K. Bhabha; Margaret Busby; Maureen Freely; Deirdre Osborne; Nathalie Teitler
2024	Haruki Murakami (1949–)	Japan	Japanese	novel, short story, essays	Chair: Kit Fan; Members: Moniza Alvi; Kwame Anthony Appiah; Chloe Aridjis; Homi K. Bhabha; Margaret Busby; Maureen Freely; Deirdre Osborne; Nathalie Teitler
2024	Suzan-Lori Parks (1963–)	United States	English	drama, screenplay	Chair: Kit Fan; Members: Moniza Alvi; Kwame Anthony Appiah; Chloe Aridjis; Homi K. Bhabha; Margaret Busby; Maureen Freely; Deirdre Osborne; Nathalie Teitler
2024	Judith Schalansky (1980–)	Germany	German	novel, essays	Chair: Kit Fan; Members: Moniza Alvi; Kwame Anthony Appiah; Chloe Aridjis; Homi K. Bhabha; Margaret Busby; Maureen Freely; Deirdre Osborne; Nathalie Teitler
2024	Samanta Schweblin (1978–)	Argentina	Spanish	novel, short story	Chair: Kit Fan; Members: Moniza Alvi; Kwame Anthony Appiah; Chloe Aridjis; Homi K. Bhabha; Margaret Busby; Maureen Freely; Deirdre Osborne; Nathalie Teitler
2024	Kim Scott (1957–)	Australia	English	novel, short story, essays	Chair: Kit Fan; Members: Moniza Alvi; Kwame Anthony Appiah; Chloe Aridjis; Homi K. Bhabha; Margaret Busby; Maureen Freely; Deirdre Osborne; Nathalie Teitler
2024	Olive Senior (1941–)	Jamaica	English and Jamaican Patois	poetry, short story, novel, essays	Chair: Kit Fan; Members: Moniza Alvi; Kwame Anthony Appiah; Chloe Aridjis; Homi K. Bhabha; Margaret Busby; Maureen Freely; Deirdre Osborne; Nathalie Teitler
2025
2025	Ahmad Almallah (1985–)	Palestine; United States	English and Arabic	poetry, essays	Chair: Deirdre Osborne; Members: Kit Fan; Sunetra Gupta; Lucy Hannah; Sarah Ladipo Manyika; Sharmaine Lovegrove; Alberto Manguel
2025	Merlie M. Alunan (1943–)	Philippines	English, Cebuano and Waray	poetry, short story, essays	Chair: Deirdre Osborne; Members: Kit Fan; Sunetra Gupta; Lucy Hannah; Sarah Ladipo Manyika; Sharmaine Lovegrove; Alberto Manguel
2025	Hoda Barakat (1952–)	Lebanon	Arabic	novel, short story, memoirs, drama	Chair: Deirdre Osborne; Members: Kit Fan; Sunetra Gupta; Lucy Hannah; Sarah Ladipo Manyika; Sharmaine Lovegrove; Alberto Manguel
2025	Dionne Brand (1953–)	Canada	English	poetry, novel, essays	Chair: Deirdre Osborne; Members: Kit Fan; Sunetra Gupta; Lucy Hannah; Sarah Ladipo Manyika; Sharmaine Lovegrove; Alberto Manguel
2025	Dave Eggers (1970–)	United States	English	novel, short story, essays	Chair: Deirdre Osborne; Members: Kit Fan; Sunetra Gupta; Lucy Hannah; Sarah Ladipo Manyika; Sharmaine Lovegrove; Alberto Manguel
2025	Nona Fernández (1971–)	Chile	Spanish	novel, short story, memoirs, drama	Chair: Deirdre Osborne; Members: Kit Fan; Sunetra Gupta; Lucy Hannah; Sarah Ladipo Manyika; Sharmaine Lovegrove; Alberto Manguel
2025	Helon Habila (1967–)	Nigeria	English	novel, poetry	Chair: Deirdre Osborne; Members: Kit Fan; Sunetra Gupta; Lucy Hannah; Sarah Ladipo Manyika; Sharmaine Lovegrove; Alberto Manguel
2025	László Krasznahorkai (1954–)	Hungary	Hungarian	novel, short story, essay, screenplay	Chair: Deirdre Osborne; Members: Kit Fan; Sunetra Gupta; Lucy Hannah; Sarah Ladipo Manyika; Sharmaine Lovegrove; Alberto Manguel
2025	Earl Lovelace (1935–)	Trinidad and Tobago	English and Trinidadian Creole	novel, drama, short story, essays	Chair: Deirdre Osborne; Members: Kit Fan; Sunetra Gupta; Lucy Hannah; Sarah Ladipo Manyika; Sharmaine Lovegrove; Alberto Manguel
2025	Ruth Ozeki (1956–)	United States; Japan	English and Japanese	novel, autobiography	Chair: Deirdre Osborne; Members: Kit Fan; Sunetra Gupta; Lucy Hannah; Sarah Ladipo Manyika; Sharmaine Lovegrove; Alberto Manguel
2025	Safiya Sinclair (1984–)	Jamaica	English and Jamaican Patois	poetry, memoirs	Chair: Deirdre Osborne; Members: Kit Fan; Sunetra Gupta; Lucy Hannah; Sarah Ladipo Manyika; Sharmaine Lovegrove; Alberto Manguel
2025	Eliot Weinberger (1949–)	United States	English	essays, literary criticism, translation	Chair: Deirdre Osborne; Members: Kit Fan; Sunetra Gupta; Lucy Hannah; Sarah Ladipo Manyika; Sharmaine Lovegrove; Alberto Manguel
