= Kit Fan =

Hong Kong/UK writer (born 1979)

Kit Fan FRSL
- Born: Fan Chun Kit; 1979 (age 46–47); Hong Kong
- Education: Chinese University of Hong Kong (BA); University of York (MA, PhD)
- Occupations: Author, poet, novelist, critic
- Years active: 2006–present

Chinese name
- Traditional Chinese: 范進傑
- Simplified Chinese: 范进杰
- Hanyu Pinyin: Fàn Jìnjié
- Jyutping: Faan6 Zeon3-git6
- Website: www.kitfan.net

Kit Fan FRSL (范進傑; born 1979) is an author and poet from Hong Kong who now lives in the United Kingdom. In 2011, his poetry book Paper Scissors Stone won the Hong Kong University International Poetry Prize. In 2021, his first novel Diamond Hill was published with critical acclaim. In 2022, he was elected Fellow of the Royal Society of Literature. In 2023, His third poetry collection The Ink Cloud Reader was shortlisted for the Forward Prize and the T. S. Eliot Prize.

== Biography ==
Fan was born and raised in Hong Kong and studied at the Chinese University of Hong Kong, before moving to the UK at the age of 21. He completed his PhD at the University of York on Thom Gunn. His first book of poetry, Paper Scissors Stone, published in 2011, won the Hong Kong University International Poetry Prize and his second, As Slow as Possible, released in 2018, was recommended by the Poetry Book Society, The Guardian and the Irish Times.

His first novel, Diamond Hill, was written between 2016 and 2019 and he received a Northern Writers Award for it while in progress in 2018; it was published in May 2021. It was described by The Guardian as "a thoroughly enjoyable and profound exploration of powerlessness, identity and the evolution of a city" and by The Wall Street Journal as a "textured, unsettled portrait of a territory facing a decisive ending". It is set in the Diamond Hill area of Hong Kong in 1987, when the area – once known for its film studios – was a shanty town. The novel follows the narrator, a former heroin addict nicknamed Buddha, who has been sent to live in a nunnery (based on the Chi Lin Nunnery).

Fan was elected Fellow of the Royal Society of Literature in 2022.

In 2023, Fan was shortlisted for Forward Prize and T. S. Eliot Prize for his poetry collection The Ink Cloud Reader

== Works ==
- Paper Scissors Stone, 2011 (poetry)
- As Slow as Possible, 2018 (poetry)
- Diamond Hill, 2021 (novel)
- The Ink Cloud Reader, 2023 (poetry)
- Goodbye Chinatown, 2026 (novel)

== Service to Creative Industries ==
Since 2023, Fan has served as a Non-Executive Director and subsequently the Vice Chair of Authors' Licensing and Collecting Society, championing authors' copyrights and ensuring that they are fairly compensated for any of their works that are copied, broadcast or recorded.

Since 2025, Fan has been appointed the Co-Chair of Copyright Licensing Agency, a not-for-profit company issuing collective licenses and pays royalties directly to copyright owners – authors, publishers, and visual artists.
