= Dorothy Osborne =

British letter writer (1627–1695)

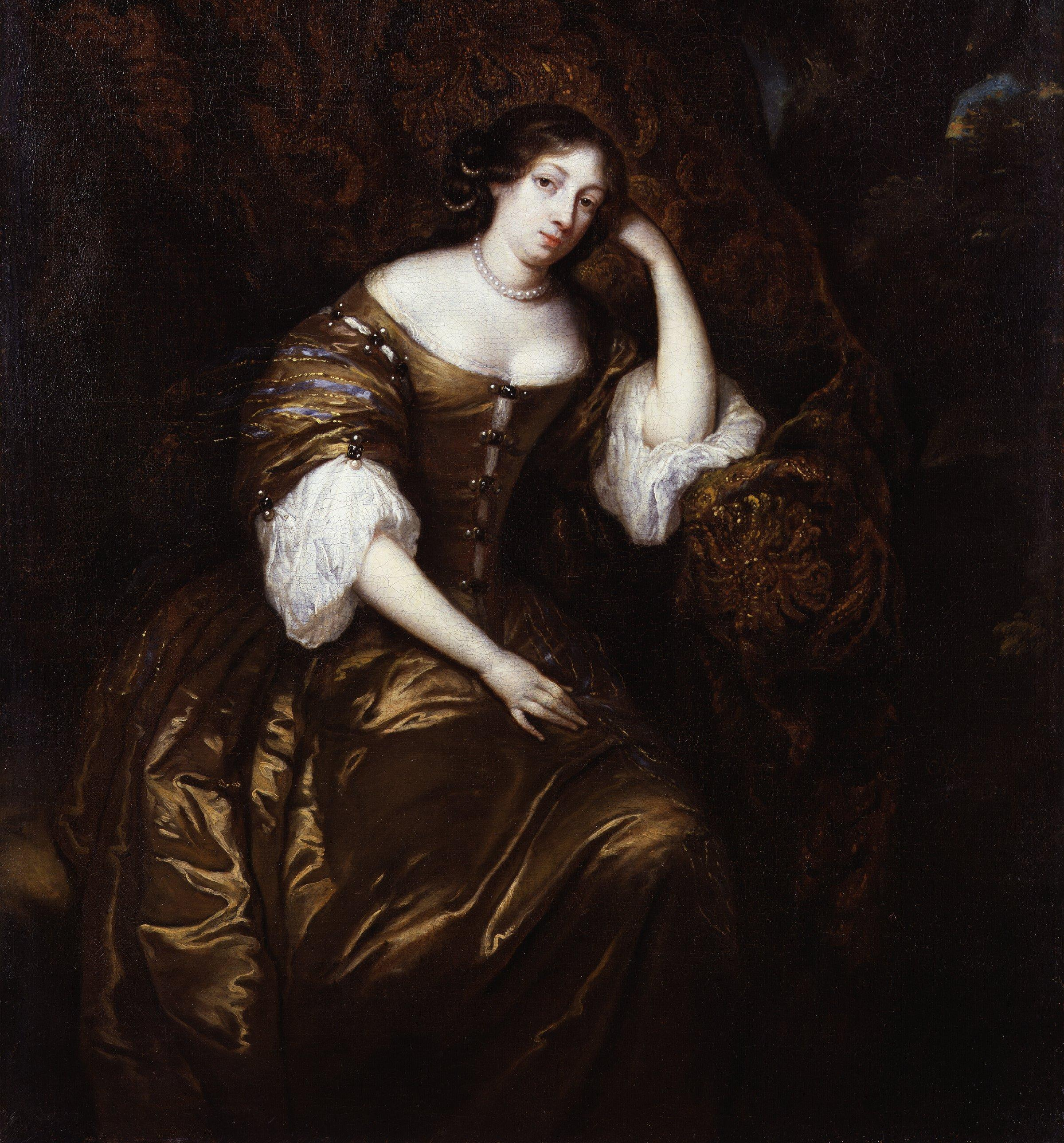
Dorothy, Lady Temple, Gaspar Netscher, 1671

Dorothy Osborne, Lady Temple (1627–1695) was an English writer of letters and wife of Sir William Temple, 1st Baronet.

== Life ==
Osborne was born at Chicksands Priory, Bedfordshire, England, the youngest of twelve children of Sir Peter Osborne, Lieutenant-Governor of the Isle of Guernsey under Charles I of England, by his wife Dorothy Danvers, a sister of Sir John Danvers the regicide. The Osbornes were a staunchly Royalist family.

After refusing a long string of suitors put forth by her family, including her cousin Thomas Osborne, 1st Duke of Leeds, Henry Cromwell (son of Lord Protector Oliver Cromwell) and Sir Justinian Isham, in 1654 Dorothy Osborne married Sir William Temple, a man with whom she had carried on a lengthy clandestine courtship that was largely epistolary in nature. It is for her letters to Temple, which were witty, progressive and socially illuminating, that Osborne is remembered. Only Osborne's side of the correspondence survives, comprising a collection of 79 letters held in the British Library (Add MS 33975).

Osborne fell in love with Temple in 1647, when the pair were both about nineteen years old. Although both families opposed the match on financial grounds, seventeenth-century marriages frequently being business arrangements, she steadfastly remained single. Following the death of her father, the couple's families sanctioned the match, bringing to a close nearly seven years of intermittent courtship—the latter two marked by the famous exchange of letters. The wedding took place on 25 December 1654, and the marriage lasted until Lady Temple's death on 7 February 1695.

Although there is little extant trace of Osborne after she wed, a few of her married notes and letters survive, though they lack the wit and verve of her courtship letters. Scattered references indicate that Osborne was keenly involved in her husband's diplomatic career and matters of state. Sir William's career posted the couple abroad for periods of their married life, including time in both Brussels (in the Spanish Netherlands) and the Dutch Republic. Temple was Ambassador in The Hague twice, latterly during the marriage negotiations of William and Mary. In 1671 Charles II of England used Dorothy to provoke the Third Anglo-Dutch War by letting her on 24 August sail through the Dutch fleet on the royal yacht Merlin, demanding to be saluted with white smoke. Osborne was an important and acknowledged figure in the later marriage negotiations because of her friendship with both William III of Orange and Princess Mary. Osborne's close friendship with Mary lasted until the Queen's death in 1694.

Osborne (Lady Temple) had nine children, all but two of whom died in infancy. A daughter, Diana, succumbed to smallpox at age fourteen, and a son, John, ended his life in his twenties, but not before he had married and fathered two children, providing Sir William and Lady Temple with two granddaughters: Elizabeth and Dorothy Temple.

Lady Temple died at Moor Park, Surrey, and is buried in the west aisle of Westminster Abbey, along with her husband Sir William Temple, daughter Diana Temple and Temple's sister, Martha, Lady Giffard, whose adult life was spent as a member of the Osborne/Temple household.

== Publication history ==
Dorothy Osborne's letters have been published numerous times since their initial appearance in print in 1888. The most recent edition is edited by Kenneth Parker: Dorothy Osborne: Letters to Sir William Temple, 1652–54: Observations on Love, Literature, Politics and Religion (Ashgate, 2002), although that edition is not without problems for specialised users, namely with regards to the correct order of some of the letters, many of which were undated and are difficult to place sequentially. The text of editor Sir Edward Parry's 1888 edition is available online at . Parry's edition is particularly valuable for its useful commentary, although unfortunately he did not retain the original orthography for his transcription, and the "modern English" in some cases lessens the considerable charm of Osborne's prose. G. C. Moore Smith's (1928) and Parker's critical editions retain Osborne's spelling and punctuation.

== Critical appreciations ==
- F. L. Lucas, "The Perfect Letter-Writer", essay in his Studies French and English (London, 1934, pp. 151–174 ; repr. 1951, 1969). Originally "A Seventeenth-Century Courtship : The Love Letters of Dorothy Osborne,” Listener, 22 Jan 1930 – text of a wireless talk, reprinted in Life and Letters, Vol. 5 No. 26, July 1930, and in Modern Short Biographies, ed. M. Balch (Harcourt Brace, N. Y., 1935).
- Lord David Cecil, Two Quiet Lives: Dorothy Osborne and Thomas Gray (London, Constable, 1948)
- Jane Dunn, Read My Heart. Dorothy Osborne and Sir William Temple: A Love Story in the Age of Revolution (London, HarperPress, 2008) ISBN 978-0-007-18220-6.
