= Hannah Khalil =

London-born Irish-Palestinian playwright and screenwriter

Hannah Khalil FRSL
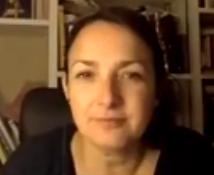
- In an online discussion in 2020
- Born: Hannah Mary Khalil; 1977 (age 48–49)
- Education: St Mary's University, Twickenham
- Spouse: Chris White
- Website: hannahkhalil.com

Hannah Mary Khalil FRSL (born 1977) is a playwright of Irish-Palestinian heritage. Her plays include Plan D (2010), Scenes from *68 Years (2016), Hakawatis: Women of the Arabian Nights (2022) and My Persian Kitchen (2025).

== Early life ==
Khalil was born to an Irish mother and a Palestinian father from Yasuf and grew up in Dubai and Jordan. She would also spend summers in Ireland. At age 10, Khalil was sent to boarding school in England. Upon her parents' divorce when she was a teenager, her mother moved to Pimlico, London.

Khalil graduated with a Bachelor of Arts (BA) in English and Drama from St Mary's University, Twickenham.

== Career ==
Khalil self-produced the play Plan D, which premiered at the Tristan Bates Theatre in 2010. The play portrays a Palestinian family's experience during the Nakba. Plan D was shortlisted for the Meyer-Whitworth Award. Her other early work included Ring, Leaving Home, The Unofficial Guide and Bitterenders.

In 2016, Khalil premiered Scenes from 68* Years at the Arcola Theatre, marking 68 years since the Nakba. Scenes from 68* Years was shortlisted for the James Tait Black Memorial Prize. This project evolved into Scenes from 71* Years in 2019 and Trouf: 75 Years in 2023.

This was followed by The Scar Test, containing verbatim accounts of Yarl's Wood detention centre, in 2017 at the Soho Theatre and A Museum in Baghdad, about Gertrude Bell, produced by the Royal Shakespeare Company in 2019. She also contributed Metaverse to the National Theatre of Scotland science fiction collection Interference.

In 2021 as a visiting writer-in-residence, Khalil was appointed Charles A Heimbold Jr Chair of Irish Studies at Villanova University. Maxine Peake directed a charity performance of Khalil's Bitterenders at the Arcola Theatre.

Khalil was the 2022 Writer-in-Residence at the Globe Theatre. For the Globe, she adapted Hans Christian Andersen's The Fir Tree for stage, which received critical acclaim, as well as Shakespeare and Fletcher's Henry VIII, titled The Life of King Henry VIII: All is True. She ended the year with Hakawatis: Women of the Arabian Nights at the Sam Wanamaker Playhouse. Also in 2022, Khalil was inducted as a Fellow of the Royal Society of Literature.

Next came Khalil's play My English Persian Kitchen, based on the true story of Iranian-born food writer and nutritionist Atoosa Sepehr and starring Isabella Nefar. The play premiered at the 2024 Edinburgh Fringe Festival and had a London run before embarking on a UK tour. Khalil also adapted Treasure Island, staged at the Orange Tree Theatre.

== Personal life ==
Khalil is married to theatre director Chris White.

== Select plays ==
- Plan D
- Bitterenders
- Scenes from 68* Years
  - Scenes from 71* Years
  - Trouf: 75 Years
  - Scenes from 77* Years
- The Scar Test
- Interference – Metaverse
- A Museum in Baghdad
- The Censor or How to Put on a Political Play without getting fined or arrested
- The Fir Tree
- The Life of King Henry VIII: All is True
- Hakawatis: Women of the Arabian Nights
- My English Persian Kitchen
- Treasure Island
- Love Omar
