= Huda Fakhreddine =

Lebanese-American literary scholar

Huda J. Fakhreddine is a Lebanese-American literary scholar, translator, writer and political activist, known for her work on modern Arabic literature, particularly Arabic poetry. She is currently an associate professor of Arabic literature at the University of Pennsylvania. In addition to her academic work, she is known for her political activism, especially in relation to the Israeli-Palestinian conflict.

== Early life and education ==
Fakhreddine was born and raised in Lebanon. She earned her bachelor's degree in English literature in 2002 and her master's degree in English literature in 2004, both from the American University of Beirut, and later completed a Ph.D. in Near Eastern Languages and Cultures at Indiana University Bloomington in 2011. Her doctoral work focused on metapoesis in the Arabic literary tradition.

== Academic and literary career ==
Fakhreddine is the associate professor of Arabic literature, Department of Middle Eastern Languages and Cultures at the University of Pennsylvania. She has authored and co-edited 3 books, and has translated and written several dozen poems and articles. Her first book, Metapoesis in the Arabic Tradition (Brill, 2015), explores how Arab poets historically reflect on poetry itself. Her second major work, The Arabic Prose Poem: Poetic Theory and Practice (Edinburgh University Press, 2021), analyzes the development and significance of the Arabic prose poem as a modernist form

She is also co-editor of The Routledge Handbook of Arabic Poetry (2023), an editor with the Library of Arabic Literature, and co-editor-in-chief of Middle Eastern Literatures. Her translations have appeared in publications such as Banipal, World Literature Today, and ArabLit Quarterly, and include works such as Lighthouse for the Drowning by her father, poet and professor of Arabic literature , Jawdat Fakhreddine. In 2021, together with her daughter Samaa and husband Ahmad Almallah, an artist in residence at the University of Pennsylvania, she translated and published Thirty Poems for Children, a collection of poems by her father.

As of July 2025, Fakhreddine has gone on leave for the academic year 2025–26.

== Activism and controversy ==
Fakhreddine is a politically and socially engaged activist, particularly in support of Palestinian rights. She was one of the co-organizers and speakers of the Palestine Writes Literature Festival in Philadelphia, which is the only North American literature festival dedicated to Palestinian writers and artists. The festival attracted controversy due to its association with several speakers and themes perceived by university donors and Penn's administration as having a history of making antisemitic statements, a claim which the organizers and attendees rejected.

Her writings often include strong criticisms of Israel, especially in the context of Gaza and the West Bank, and she has expressed solidarity with Palestinian resistance movements. In an article she wrote titled “Intifada: On Being an Arabic Literature Professor in a Time of Genocide”, Fakhreddine frames her academic role as inherently political, accusing academic institutions of complicity in what she terms “colonial violence”.

In a December 2023 hearing in the U.S. House Committee on Education and the Workforce titled "Holding Campus Leaders Accountable And Confronting Antisemitism", committee member Jim Banks referenced Fakhreddine by name during the testimony of Upenn's president Liz Magill. Banks cited an October 7, 2023 tweet Fakhreddine posted in which she stated "while we were asleep, Palestine invented a new way of life", which he claimed was an attempt to romanticize the murder of over 1,000 Israeli Jews by Hamas. The committee's follow-up letter to Penn in January 2024 included Fakhreddine as an example of a faculty member accused of making "antisemitic remarks and statements in support of Hamas", referencing her social media posts and actions during protests on campus. In a May 2026 article in The New Republic, Fakhreddine said she believed she was the basis for a pro-Palestinian professor character depicted as complicit in a murder in a January 2024 episode of Law & Order.

In May 2024, Fakhreddine was the center of controversy surrounding the selection procedure for the Bessel Research Award in recognition of outstanding accomplishments in research, awarded by the Humboldt Foundation. The British Society for Middle Eastern Studies (BRISMES) accused the Humboldt Foundation of rejecting Fakhreddine's nomination due to her publicly expressed opinions on the war in Gaza. The foundation denied these allegations in a public letter.

In January 2025, a federal judge dismissed with prejudice a lawsuit filed by Fakhreddine and History and Africana Studies professor Eve Troutt Powell in conjunction with Penn Faculty for Justice in Palestine. The plaintiffs had accused the University of engaging in "McCarthyism" by allegedly suppressing speech critical of Israel. They sought to prevent the university from complying with the U.S. House Committee on Education and the Workforce’s request for documents related to alleged antisemitism on campus. The court's decision to dismiss the case with prejudice effectively ended the legal challenge, barring the plaintiffs from refiling the same claims.

== Selected works ==
- Metapoesis in the Arabic Tradition (Brill, 2015)
- The Arabic Prose Poem: Poetic Theory and Practice (Edinburgh University Press, 2021)
- The Routledge Handbook of Arabic Poetry (Routledge, 2023)
- Zaman saghir taht shams thaniya (A Small Time Under a Different Sun, creative nonfiction, 2019)
- Wa min thamma al-'alam (And then, the World), a poetry collection (2025)
- Lighthouse for the Drowning a poetry collection by Jawdat Fakhreddine (translator), (BOA editions, 2017)
- The Sky That Denied Me: Selections from Jawdat Fakhreddine (translator) (UT Austin Press, 2020)
- Come, Take a Gentle Stab: Selections from Salim Barakat (translator), (Seagull Books, 2021)
- The Universe, All at Once: Selections and Interview with Salim Barakat (translator)( Seagull Books, 2024)
- Palestinian: Four Poems by Ibrahim Nasrallah (translator) (World Poetry Books, 2024)
- Numerous translations and article on modern and pre-modern Arabic poetry in leading literary journals and outlets in English and in Arabic
