= Eve M. Troutt Powell =

American historian

Eve Troutt Powell
- Education: Radcliffe College, Harvard University.
- Awards: MacArthur Fellows Program
- Scientific career
- Fields: History
- Workplaces: University of Pennsylvania

Eve M. Troutt Powell is an American historian of the Middle East and North Africa and Christopher H. Browne Distinguished Professor of History in the Department of History at the University of Pennsylvania. She is a previous recipient of a MacArthur Fellowship.

== Early life and education ==
She graduated with a B.A from Radcliffe College and an M.A., and Ph.D. in history and Middle Eastern studies from Harvard University. Following her undergraduates studies, she served as a presidential intern at the American University of Cairo (AUC). Her experience at the AUC sparked her interest in Egypt and the Middle East.

== Academic career ==
Troutt Powell began her academic career at the University of Georgia, where she taught for a decade. She later joined the University of Pennsylvania, where she holds the position of Christopher H. Browne Distinguished Professor of History and Africana Studies. Her teaching focuses on the history of the modern Middle East, with particular emphasis on Egypt, Sudan, and the Ottoman Empire. As a cultural historian, she integrates literature and film into her courses to explore themes of race, slavery, and colonialism. She is a member of the American Historical Association and previously served as president of the Middle East Studies Association. She is an expert on Egypt, Sudan, and slavery in the Nile Valley.

== Research and publications ==
Troutt Powell's scholarship focused on the race and slavery in the Nile Valley and the Ottoman Empire. Her notable works include:

- A Different Shade of Colonialism, Egypt Great Britain and the Mastery of Sudan, University of California Press, 2003, ISBN 978-0-520-23317-1
- The African Diaspora in the Mediterranean Lands of Islam, Editors John O. Hunwick, Eve Troutt Powell, Markus Wiener Publishers, 2002, ISBN 978-1-55876-275-6
- "The Tools of the Master: Slavery and Empire in Nineteenth Century Egypt", School of Social Science
- Tell This in My Memory: Stories of Enslavement from Egypt, Sudan, and the Ottoman Empire, Stanford University Press, 14 nov. 2012, 264 p., ISBN 0804788642, 9780804788649

== Awards and fellowships ==
In recognition of her contributions to historical scholarship, Troutt Powell was awarded a MacArthur Fellows Program in 2003. She has also received fellowships from the American Research Center in Egypt, the Social Science Research Council, the Institute for Advanced Study in Princeton, and the Radcliffe Institute for Advanced Study.

== Activism and public engagement ==
In addition to her academic achievements, Troutt Powell has publicly supported Palestinian human rights and academic freedom.

In a protest march on Penn's campus on April 25, 2024 calling for a ceasefire in Gaza and divestment from Israel, Troutt Powell said Penn’s involvement with Israeli investments is “scholasticide.” “I’ve devoted 18 years of my life to this place, that’s why I’m protesting,” Powell said. “Oh, University of Pennsylvania — to urge us all — to use this place and its incredible resources of knowledge, production for peace, for truth, for scholarship, for life. Not to make killer robots.”

In January 2025, a federal judge dismissed with prejudice a lawsuit filed by Eve Troutt Powell and associate professor of Arabic literature Huda Fakhredine in conjunction with Penn Faculty for Justice in Palestine. The plaintiffs had accused the University of engaging in "McCarthyism" by allegedly suppressing speech critical of Israel. They sought to prevent the university from complying with the U.S. House Committee on Education and the Workforce’s request for documents related to alleged antisemitism on campus. The court's decision to dismiss the case with prejudice effectively ended the legal challenge, barring the plaintiffs from refiling the same claims.

== Open-Access Resources ==
- Written interview for Afropop Worldwide, 2011
- Audio episode of The Ottoman History Podcast, 2016 ("Narratives of Slavery in Late Ottoman Egypt")
- Recorded video conversation for Afikra, 2022
