= Jane Dunn =

British author

Jane Dunn is a British author. She is a fellow of the Royal Society of Literature.

== Early and personal life ==
She was born Jane Thesen, daughter of David and Ellinor Thesen, in Durban, South Africa. She is great-great-grand-daughter of both John Bennie (first Xhosa linguist, and co-founder of Lovedale Mission School) and Charles Wilhelm Thesen. She grew up in Wiltshire, the eldest of eight children.

Dunn received a BA (Hons) in Philosophy from University College London.

Her first job was in the editorial department of Vogue magazine.

She was married to the publisher Philip Dunn (1946-2007), with two children, Benjamin and Lily. She is now married to the linguist and author Nicholas Ostler and has lived in Hungerford since 2015.

== Books ==
=== Non-fiction ===
- Moon in Eclipse: A Life of Mary Shelley (1978) ISBN 978-0-29777-383-2
- Virginia Woolf and Vanessa Bell: A Very Close Conspiracy (1990) ISBN 978-0-22402-234-7
- Antonia White: A Life (1998) ISBN 978-0-22403-619-1
- Elizabeth and Mary: Cousins, Rivals, Queens (2003) ISBN 978-0-00257-150-0
- Read My Heart: Dorothy Osborne & Sir William Temple. A Love Story in the Age of Revolution (2008) ISBN 978-0-00718-220-6
- Daphne du Maurier and Her Sisters: The Hidden Lives of Piffy, Bird and Bing (2013) ISBN 978-0-00734-708-7

=== Fiction ===
- The Marriage Season (2023) ISBN 978-1-80483-526-5
- An Unsuitable Heiress (2023) ISBN 978-1-80483-537-1
- A Scandalous Match (2024) ISBN 978-1-80483-547-0
