= Daisy Hay =

Author and Associate Professor

Daisy Hay FRSL
- Occupations: Author and associate professor
- Employer: University of Exeter
- Notable work: Young Romantics: The Shelleys, Byron and Other Tangled Lives (2010); Mr & Mrs Disraeli – A Strange Romance (2015)
- Awards: Rose Mary Crawshay Prize; Somerset Maugham Award; Philip Leverhulme Prize

Daisy Hay is Associate Professor in English Literature and Life Writing at the University of Exeter and an author of non-fiction. Hay was elected a Fellow of the Royal Society of Literature in 2018.

== Career ==
Hay's research interests are in late eighteenth- and early-to-mid nineteenth-century literature in Britain, focusing on the intersections of literature, history and politics.

She was a Bye-Fellow at Murray Edwards College, Cambridge, from 2006 to 2009, and the Alistair Horne Fellow at St Antony's College, Oxford, from 2009 to 2010.

In 2014, Hay was selected as one of the BBC Radio 3 and the Arts and Humanities Research Council New Generation Thinkers, a group of ten academics from eight universities chosen to turn their academic ideas into BBC radio and television programmes. Hay's broadcast proposal was on how Benjamin Disraeli changed politics, by using his private life in a public way to win votes, and was based on Hay's biography of Disraeli and his wife Mary Anne Disraeli.

== Awards ==
Hay was awarded the Rose Mary Crawshay Prize for literary scholarship by the British Academy, for her first book Young Romantics: The Shelleys, Byron and Other Tangled Lives, published in 2010. In 2012, she was awarded a fellowship at the Radcliffe Institute for Advanced Study at Harvard University.

In 2016, Hay won the Somerset Maugham Award for her second book Mr & Mrs Disraeli – A Strange Romance, a biography of the politician Benjamin Disraeli and his wife Mary Anne Disraeli. In the same year, she received a Philip Leverhulme Prize, an award recognising researchers with outstanding and internationally recognised work. Hay used the award to write a research project examining the emergence of English Romanticism.

Hay was elected a Fellow of the Royal Society of Literature (FRSL) in 2018, as one of the RSL's "40 under 40" group of forty academics under the age of forty honoured for their achievements as younger writers.

== Publications ==
Hay is the author of four published non-fiction books. Her first book, Young Romantics: The Shelleys, Byron and Other Tangled Lives, was published in 2010 by Bloomsbury.

Hay's second book, Mr and Mrs Disraeli: A Strange Romance, published in 2015 by Chatto and Windus, draws on Mary Anne Disraeli's collection of letters from the Disraeli collection at Oxford's Bodleian Library, to trace the courtship and marriage of Mary Anne and her husband Benjamin Disraeli.

Hay's third book was published in September 2018, titled The Making of Mary Shelley’s Frankenstein.

Her fourth book was published in Fall 2022, titled Dinner with Joseph Johnson: Books and Friendship in a Revolutionary Age. It was published simultaneously in London by Chatto and Windus and in the United States by Princeton University Press.
