= Green Lizards vs Red Rectangles =

- Cover art of Green Lizards vs Red Rectangles
- Author: Steve Antony
- Language: English
- Publication date: 2015

Green Lizards vs Red Rectangles is a 2015 picture book by Steve Antony, about war. It was first published by Hodder & Stoughton in the United Kingdom, and by Scholastic Press in the United States.

== Synopsis ==
The red rectangles and the green lizards do their best to defeat each other, but "the red rectangles were smart" and "the green lizards were strong". Eventually, at the urging of a small lizard who asks "what are we fighting for", and a small rectangle who exclaims "enough is enough", a truce is achieved, and lizards and rectangles live together in harmony.

== Reception ==
School Library Journal found that the moral of the story — "there is never a good reason for fighting over differences, and living peacefully together is always the best approach" — is "as simply told as the illustrations." Publishers Weekly emphasized that the "solution [to the conflict] acknowledges and celebrates difference, rather than trying to ignore or gloss over it".

The Wall Street Journal noted the book's "visually combative color scheme"; similarly, Kirkus Reviews observed that Antony's use of only two colors in the illustrations "creates a bold contrast between the two adversaries", and praised his compositions for "provid(ing) variety and neatly evok(ing) the chaos of war".

The Guardian considered the book to be "an easy, safe means to talk about the idea of war" with children. The School Librarian commended Antony for having conveyed "the futility of war" with "images suggesting fortified cities, can[n]ons, the storming of the barricades, soldiers and buildings toppling like dominoes, battlefield chaos and the utter exhaustion of the survivors."

== Sequel ==
In 2020, Antony released a sequel, Green Lizards and Red Rectangles and the Blue Ball.

== Inspiration ==
In December 2012, Antony saw Kazimir Malevich's 1915 Eight Red Rectangles on a magazine cover, shortly after having begun sketching the lizards at a wildlife park. He began including rectangles and lizards in the same drawings, but could not figure out how these two concepts could coexist, until he realized that "[t]hey don't want to coexist!"

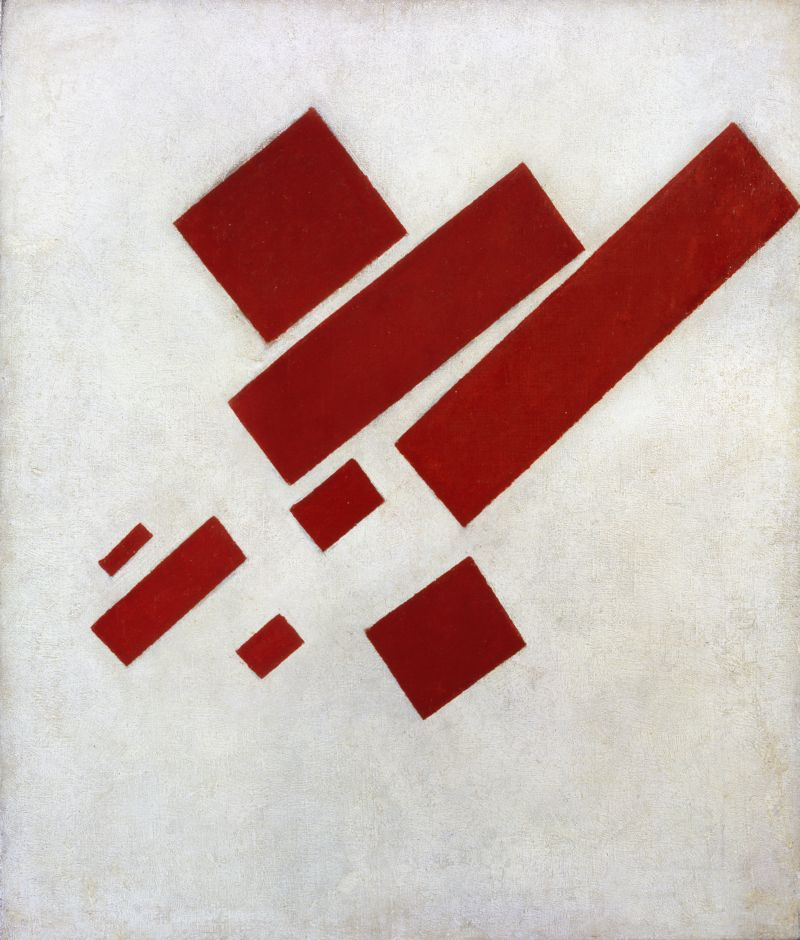
"Eight Red Rectangles", the work which partially inspired Green Lizards vs Red Rectangles
