= Syima Aslam =

English bank executive and literary critic

Syima Aslam MBE Hon. FRSL
- Born: Pakistan
- Education: Brunel University of London
- Occupation: Literature Festival Director
- Known for: Fellow of the Royal Society of Literature

Syima Aslam MBE Hon. FRSL is the CEO, Artistic Director and Founder of the Bradford Literature Festival.

== Biography ==
Syima Aslam was born in Pakistan and moved to Halifax, West Yorkshire. She then moved to Bradford while a schoolgirl. She graduated from Brunel University of London with a degree in economics and business finance in 1996.

In 2012, The Guardian published an op-ed by Aslam, where she describes all the factors a modern Muslim woman has to consider when she decides whether or not to wear a hijab.

In 2014, Aslam and her friend Irna Qureshi, an ethnographer, author and oral historian specialising in British Asian arts, founded the Bradford Literature Festival. The festival has since grown to be a significant event in the country's literary calendar. The Bradford Literature Festival is celebrated for its socio-economic and ethnic diversity, attracting over 115,000 visitors annually. Syima Aslam was motivated by her observations that people who needed to be present at cultural events were often absent. Similar festivals often cater predominantly to white, middle-class audiences in terms of content and ticket prices. This issue promotes an environment of exclusion where the mental wellbeing, inspiration, and overall benefits of arts and culture become accessible only to the privileged few. With the Bradford Literature Festival, she aimed to create something accessible and aspirational, bringing crucial conversations to those who needed to be part of them.

Aslam is a Member of the Board of Trustees for The Piece Hall Trust, appointed in 2021.

In 2019, the BBC News asked Aslam to sit on a six person panel to recommend the 100 "most inspiring" novels.

Aslam has also appeared several times on the popular podcast, The Graham Norton Book Club.

== Awards and honours ==
In 2018, Syima Aslam was announced as the winner of the Hospital Club H100 Award in the publishing and writing category. In the same year she was also awarded Professional of the Year by Yorkshire Asian Business Awards.

Aslam was elected as an honorary Fellow of the Royal Society of Literature in 2019.

In 2020, Aslam won the Inspiring Professionals category of the inaugural Northern Asian Powerlist 2020.

She was appointed Member of the Order of the British Empire (MBE) in the 2022 New Year Honours for services to literature.

In 2023, Aslam was awarded 'Disruptor for Good' at Northern Power Women's Award for the work of the Bradford Literature Festival in challenging the norm and striving to make positive changes for society, with the vision to change lives through access to world-class arts, literature, and education for all.

In 2024 and 2025, Aslam was recognised in the Muslim 500 list as one of The 500 Most Influential Muslims in the World.
