= Irna Qureshi =

British ethnographer, writer and oral historian

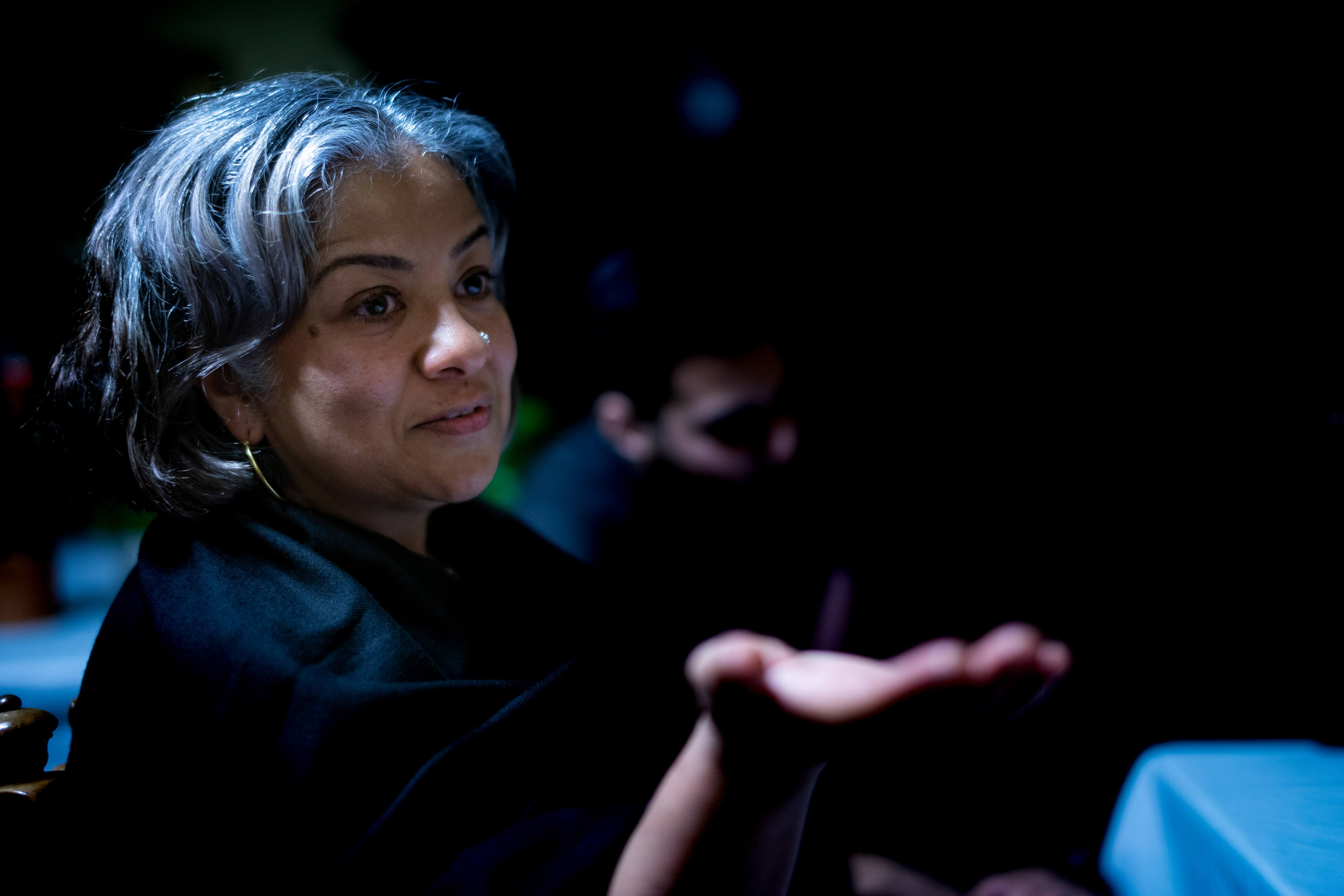
- Qureshi in 2023
- Known for: Co-founder of Bradford Literature Festival

Irna Qureshi MBE Hon. is an ethnographer, writer and oral historian specialising in British Asian arts, culture and identity. She is also co-founder of Bradford Literature Festival, alongside Syima Aslam. Qureshi works as a consultant, facilitator and mentor with a background in anthropology, working in the fields of the arts, heritage, media and social policy.

== Early life and education ==
Qureshi is British born, although much of her early years were spent in Rawalpindi and Islamabad, Pakistan.

She moved from Keighley, West Yorkshire, to Pakistan aged 4 years old where she attended Presentation Convent and was taught by English and American nuns. In 1977, the family moved back to Bradford. She spoke Urdu at home and English during the school day.

Her parents separated when she was young with little conversation and explanation, which caused confusion for her regarding procreation and relationships. This later inspired her research into intimate conversations with three generations of Muslim women.

Qureshi holds an MA in social anthropology from the School of Oriental and African Studies, University of London.

== Career ==
In 1994, she wrote Here to Stay: Bradford's South Asian Communities. In 1997, she wrote Home from Home: British Pakistanis in Mirpur.

In 2010, Qureshi published Coming of Age: Celebrating 21 Years of Mela in the UK. She also contributed to the book South Asian Media Cultures with a chapter on Destigmatising Star Texts – Honour and Shame among Muslim Women in Pakistani Cinema.

In 2011, she published The Grand Trunk Road: From Delhi to the Khyber Pass. The book was a collection of stories gathered by Irna Qureshi and photographs captured by Tim Smith. She also wrote an article entitled Women artists and male artisans in South Asia.

Qureshi began her blog Bollywood in Britain in 2011, which charts her journey of being British, Pakistani, Muslim and female in Bradford. Her autobiographical stories are set against the backdrop of the classic Indian films she grew up with. She has also written several editorials for Critical Muslim magazine. Alongside other articles for outlets such as HuffPost, The Guardian, South Asian Popular Culture, New Statesman and Culture Vulture.

In 2012, Qureshi wrote Cartographies of Love, a live performance featuring herself and based on intimate conversations with three generations of Muslim women about their attitudes towards love and marriage.

Qureshi discovered Indian films during her teenage years in Bradford. She has a private collection of vintage and contemporary Bollywood film posters. She curated Bollywood Icons: 100 Years of Indian Cinema for the National Media Museum (2013) and another exhibition, Bollywood in Love for the British Film Institute (2002).

In 2014, Qureshi, alongside Syima Aslam founded the Bradford Literature Festival. She also contributed a chapter entitled "South Asian histories in Britain: nation, locality and marginality," to the book Writing the City in British Asian Diasporas.

Qureshi worked as a location consultant on the film Ali & Ava, which was released in the UK in 2022. She also narrated a 509 Arts film, Broken Biscuits, a new folk tale written by Alan Dix that tells a tale of what happens when we die.

Qureshi is part of the University of Hull's research group, The Heritage Consortium, an AHRC/UKRI Collaborative Doctoral Training Partnership.

== Awards and honours ==
She was appointed Member of the Order of the British Empire (MBE) in the 2022 New Year Honours for services to heritage.
