= Steve Antony =

British children's author and illustrator

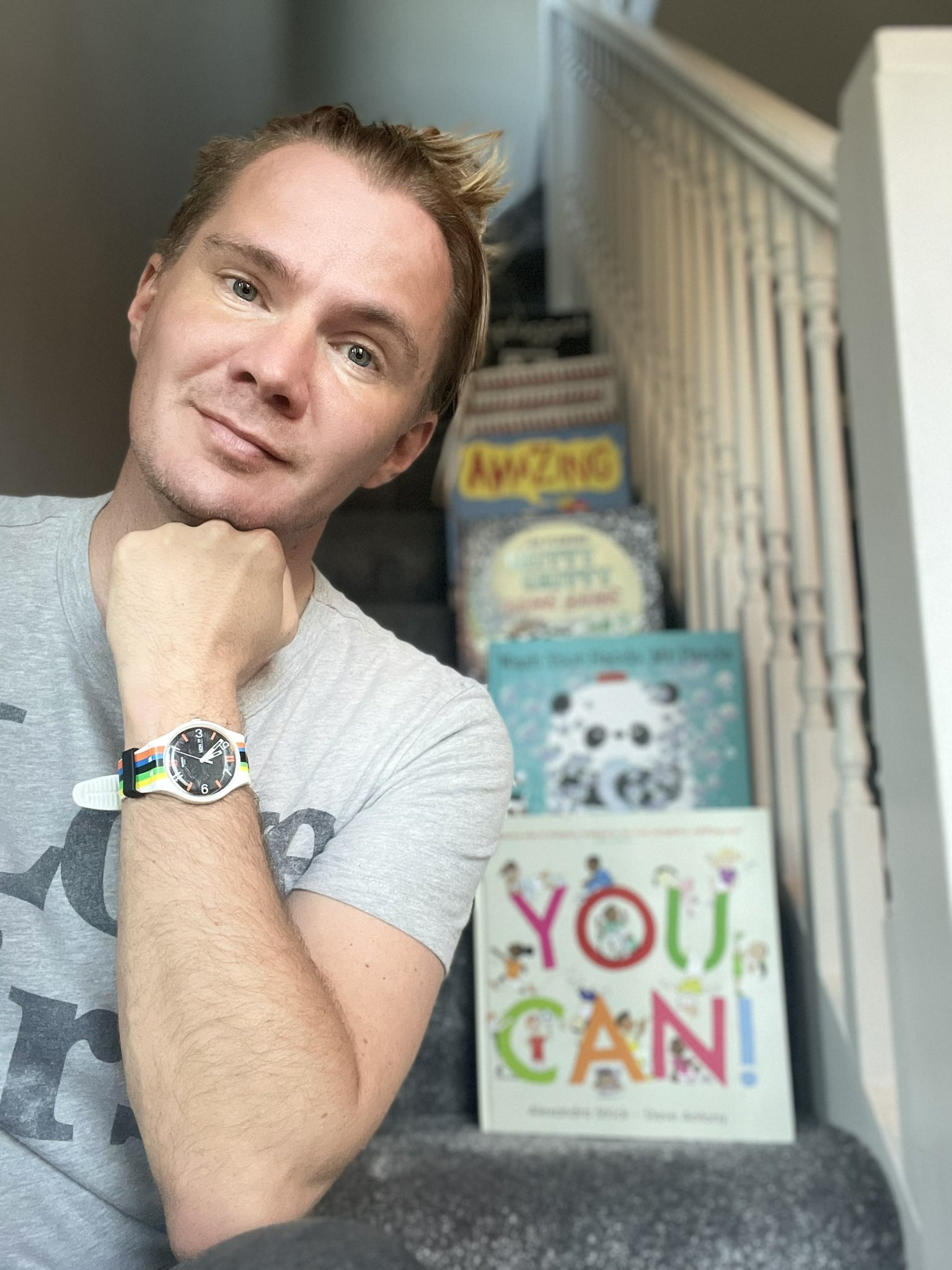
- Steve Antony in 2021
- Born: New Mexico, United States
- Education: Anglia Ruskin University
- Occupations: Children's author, illustrator
- Writing career
- Genre: Children's picture books
- Notable works: The Queen's Hat, Please, Mr. Panda
- Notable awards: Oscar's Book Prize (2015)

Steve Antony is a British children's author and illustrator, who has written and illustrated seventeen picture books and two board books.

== Early life ==
Antony grew up in New Mexico, US, the son of a painter mother and blacksmith father.

He earned a master's degree in children's book illustration from Anglia Ruskin University in 2013.

== Career ==
Antony has written and illustrated eight books in the Mr Panda series, and four in The Queen series.

Publishers Weekly reviewed his book Unplugged, "digital-age parable avoids turning heavy-handed—his characters are so cheery, carefree, and congenial that readers will quickly forget that they're being taught a lesson." Kirkus Reviews wrote, "A gentle catalyst for crucial conversations about balancing digital diversions with real-life play as well as an introduction to self-guided critical thinking."

Antony has collaborated with Tim Minchin, illustrating his story When I Grow Up.

He won the Oscar's Book Prize in 2015, for his book The Queen's Hat. The award was presented by X Files actor Gillian Anderson. It was also shortlisted for the 2015 Waterstones Children's Book Prize.

== Personal life ==
Antony lives in Swindon.

== Publications ==
=== As author and illustrator ===
- Betty Goes Bananas. New York: Schwartz & Wade Books. 2015. ISBN 978-0-553-50761-4.
- Please, Mr. Panda. New York: Scholastic Press. 2015. ISBN 978-0-545-78892-2.
- Betty Goes Bananas in her Pyjamas. Oxford: Oxford University Press. 2015. ISBN 978-0-19-273818-9.
- Green Lizards vs Red Rectangles
- The Queen's Hat. New York: Scholastic Press. 2015. ISBN 978-0-545-83556-5.
- The Queen's Handbag. Hodder Children's Books. 2015. ISBN 978-1-444-92553-1.
- Monster in the Hood. Oxford: Oxford University Press. 2016. ISBN 978-0-19-273979-7.
- The Queen's Present. Hachette Kids Hodder Children. 2016. ISBN 978-1-444-92563-0.
- Unplugged. New York: Scholastic Press. 2018. ISBN 978-1-338-18737-3.
- Amazing. London: Hodder Children's Books. 2019. ISBN 978-1-4449-4470-9.
- The Queen's Lift-Off. Hachette Children's. 2019. ISBN 978-1-444-93421-2.
- Green Lizards and Red Rectangles and the Blue Ball: A Story About Living in Harmony. London: Hodder Children's Books. 2020. ISBN 978-1-4449-4823-3.
- Cat Nap. London: Pan Macmillan. 2024. ISBN 978-1-0350-2902-0.
- Rainbowsaurus. Northampton, Massachusetts: Crocodile Books. 2024. ISBN 978-1-62371-700-1.

=== As illustrator ===
- Minchin, Tim (2018). When I Grow Up. Scholastic Press. ISBN 978-1-338-28331-0.
- Levithan, David (2019). "As the Philadelphia Queer Youth Choir Sings Katy Perry's 'Firework'". In Dawson, Juno (ed.). Proud. Stripes Publishing.
- Kind: A Book About Kindness. Scholastic Press. 2019. ISBN 978-1-338-62705-3.
- Fleming, Ian (2020). Chitty Chitty Bang Bang. Adapted by Peter Bently. Hodder Children's Books. ISBN 978-1-444-94822-6.
- Minchin, Tim (2022). Sometimes You Have to Be a Little Bit Naughty. Scholastic Australia. ISBN 978-1-760-97646-0.
- Strick, Alexandra (2022). You Can!. Somerville, Massachusetts: Candlewick Press. ISBN 978-1-5362-2543-3. OCLC 1294283931.
