= Ruth Scurr =

British historian and literary critic

Ruth Scurr FRSL
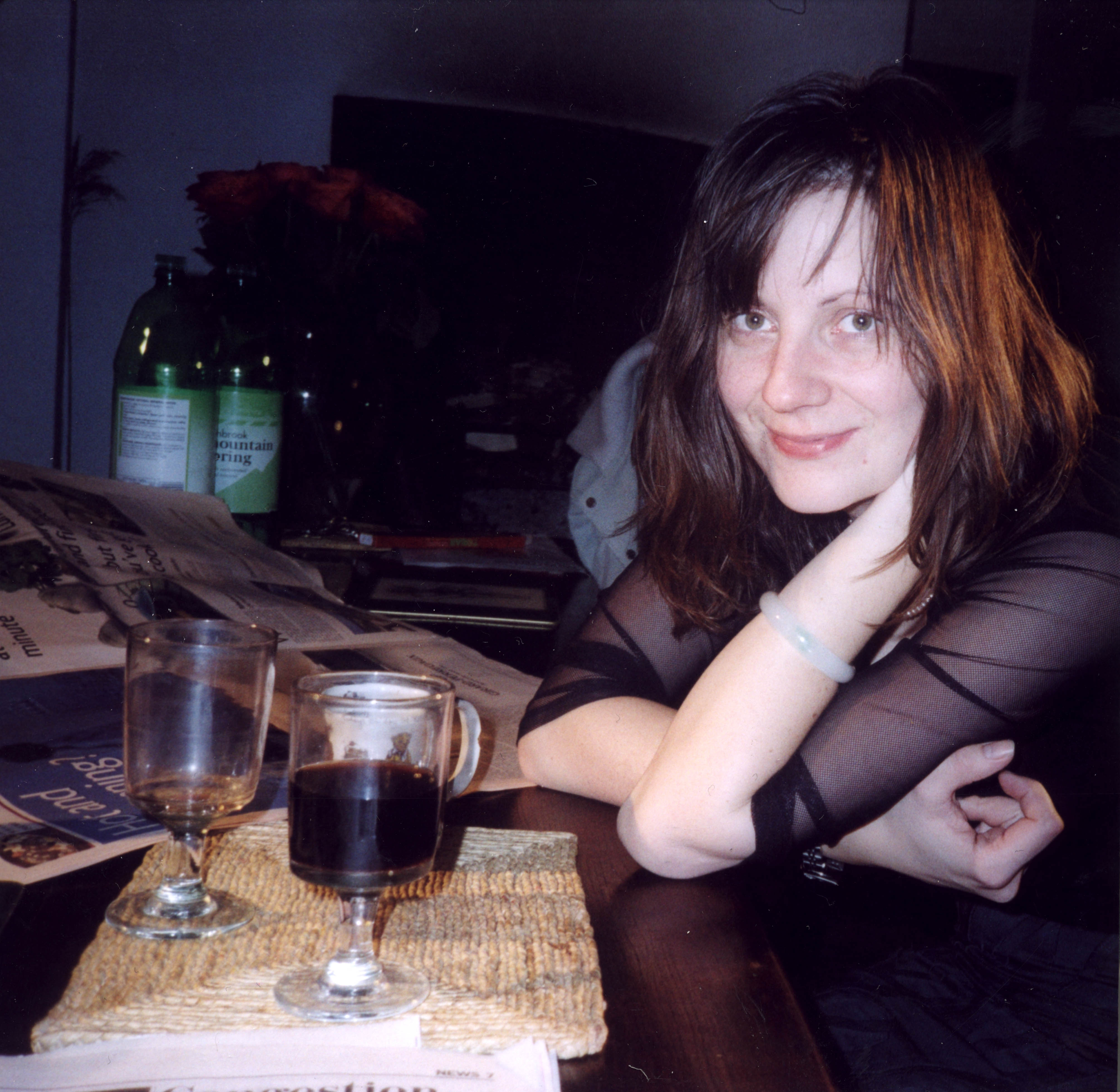
- Employer: Gonville and Caius College, Cambridge
- Spouse: Sir Peter Stothard (m. 2021)

Academic background
- Education: Oxford University; Cambridge University (PhD); Ecole Normale Supérieure
- Thesis: The Social Foundations of the Modern Republic: P.-L. Roederer's "Cours d'organisation sociale" (2000)

Academic work
- Notable works: Fatal Purity: Robespierre and the French Revolution (2006); John Aubrey: My Own Life (2015)
- Website: www.ruthscurr.co.uk

Ruth Scurr, Lady Stothard FRSL (born 1971), is a British writer, historian and literary critic. She is a Fellow of Gonville and Caius College, Cambridge.

== Education ==
Scurr was educated at St Bernard's Convent, Slough; Oxford University, Cambridge University and the Ecole Normale Supérieure, Paris. She won a British Academy Postdoctoral Fellowship in 2000.

== Works ==
Scurr's first book, Fatal Purity: Robespierre and the French Revolution (Chatto & Windus, 2006; Metropolitan Books, 2006), won the Franco-British Society Literary Prize (2006), was shortlisted for the Duff Cooper Prize (2006), long-listed for the Samuel Johnson Prize (2007) and was listed among the 100 Best Books of the Decade in The Times in 2009.

Her second book, John Aubrey: My Own Life (Chatto & Windus, 2015; New York Review Books, 2016), was shortlisted for the 2015 Costa Biography Award and the James Tait Black Memorial Prize.

Her third book, Napoleon: A Life in Gardens and Shadows (Chatto & Windus, 2021; Norton, 2021), was published to critical acclaim on both sides of the Atlantic to mark the 200th anniversary of Napoleon's death. It won the Society for Military History Distinguished Book Award for Biography (2022).

== Career ==
Scurr began reviewing regularly for The Times and The Times Literary Supplement in 1997. Since then she has also written for The Daily Telegraph, The Observer, New Statesman, The London Review of Books, The New York Review of Books, The Nation, The New York Observer, The Guardian and The Wall Street Journal.

She was a judge on the Man Booker Prize panel in 2007, the Samuel Johnson Prize panel in 2014, and the Baillie Gifford Prize panel in 2023. She is a member of the Folio Prize Academy.

Scurr is Director of Studies in Human, Social and Political Sciences for Gonville and Caius College, Cambridge, where she has been a Fellow since 2006. Her research interests include 17th- and 18th-century history of ideas; biographical, autobiographical and life writing; the British and French Enlightenments; the French Revolution; Revolutionary Memoir; early Feminist Political Thought; and contemporary fiction in English. Scurr was the Senior Treasurer of a Cambridge-based publication Per Capita Media from January 2024 to December 2025.

Having served on the Council since 2020, Scurr became acting Chair of the council of the Royal Society of Literature in January, 2025. In 2026 she was elected Chair for a further three years.

== Bibliography ==
=== Books ===
- Scurr, Ruth (2006). Fatal Purity: Robespierre and the French Revolution. London: Chatto & Windus.
- — (2015). John Aubrey: My Own Life. London: Chatto & Windus.
- — (2021). Napoleon: A Life Told in Gardens and Shadows. London: Chatto & Windus.

=== Dissertations, theses ===
- Scurr, Ruth (2000). The Social Foundations of the Modern Republic: P.-L. Roederer's Cours d'organisation sociale (Ph.D.). University of Cambridge.

=== Critical studies and reviews ===
- Anon. (11 April 2015). "A man for all seasons". Books and Arts. The Economist. Vol. 415, no. 8933. pp. 74–75. Review of John Aubrey.

== See also ==
- Maximilien Robespierre
- 2015 in literature
