= Ahmad Almallah =

Palestinian-born American poet, scholar, and activist

- Born: Bethlehem
- Education: Indiana University Bloomington (Ph.D.)
- Occupations: Poet, scholar, lecturer
- Spouse: Huda Fakhreddine
- Writing career
- Language: English, Arabic
- Notable works: Bitter English, Border Wisdom, Wrong Winds
- Notable awards: Blanche Colton Williams Fellowship, Edith Goldberg Paulson Memorial Prize

Ahmad Almallah is a Palestinian-American poet, scholar, lecturer and activist. His bilingual work in English and Arabic explores Palestinian themes. He teaches creative writing and poetry, and is an artist in residence at the University of Pennsylvania in Philadelphia.

== Early life and career ==
Almallah was born and raised in Bethlehem and immigrated to the United States in 2000. He initially studied engineering but later earned degrees in communication and film. He later completed a Ph.D. in Arabic Literature from Indiana University Bloomington. He held a tenure-track position at Middlebury College in Vermont and later joined the University of Pennsylvania as Artist-in-Residence in the creative writing program, where he also teaches both English and Arabic literature and poetry.

Almallah's scholarly work focuses on modern and classical Arabic poetics.

== Literary work ==
Almallah has published 3 books and numerous poems and articles throughout his career. His writings have appeared in various publications like Michigan Quarterly Review, Cordite Poetry Review, Birmingham Poetry Review, Great River Review, Kenyon Review, Poetry and American Poetry Review and have been translated into Arabic, Russian, Telugu, Italian, Portuguese, and Spanish. He has contributed essays to Arabic literary journals including Al-Quds Al-Arabi and Al-Arabi Al-Jadid.. \

His works include:

=== Books ===
- Bitter English (2019, University of Chicago Press, Phoenix Poets, ISBN 978-0226642642): A debut exploring immigrant identity, language, and exile over five years.
- Border Wisdom (2023, Winter Editions, ISBN 978-1959708063): A bilingual collection, translated into Arabic by Huda Fakhreddine.
- Wrong Winds (2025, Fonograf Editions, ISBN 978-1964499482): Responds to the 2023 Gaza war with multilayered, formally experimental multilingual poems.

=== Selected poems ===
Almallah's work has been widely published in literary journals, often reflecting themes of exile, language, and identity. Highlights include:

- “Recourse” – a six-part sequence that was awarded the 2017 Blanche Colton Williams Fellowship.
- “On the Way Between” – published in Jacket2, exploring American and immigrant poetics.
- “Refugee.” Kenyon Review
- Stillness.” Michigan Quarterly Review
- “Arabic Was No Longer My Arabic.” Poetry Foundation
- “Holy Land, Wasted” (with Huda Fakhreddine). Literary Hub, 2024.

=== Scholarly articles ===
- “Ethnicity in modern rewritings of Bashshār ibn Burd.” In Conflict & Friendship: Studies in Literature and Culture. 2021.
- Academic contributions in Arabic literary journals, including Al-Quds Al-Arabi and Al-Arabi Al-Jadid.

=== Essays and commentary ===
- “Extreme Translation.” Omnia (Penn Arts & Sciences), University of Pennsylvania, 2020.
- “Annotated Nightstand: Ahmad Almallah on Ghassan Kanafani and the Poetics of Return.” Literary Hub, 2023.
- Commentary and poetry columns in Jacket2 and Track//Four.

== Reception ==
Almallah's work received several reviews from industry publications and was cited for its focus on exile, language, and memory. His 2019 collection of poems, Bitter English, was described by Al Filreis in Jacket2 as a work in which "the typical poetic existential 'here I am' becomes a matter, always, of forgetting and remembering both", noting Almallah's unique approach to linguistic alienation. The Library Journal found this collection of poems a "finely crafted debut collection" that "sums up loss and fractured identity as sharply as any jeremiad".

His second publication, Border Wisdom (2023), received several reviews, mostly focusing on his transition and wordplay between English and Arabic. Michigan Quarterly Review critics remarked that Almallah "surprises with a complete departure in style, rhythm, and format from his prosaic writing," highlighting his use of "mis-ordering of the English" to evoke the structures of Arabic. A review in Hyperallergic praised the book for creating "an ethics of grief that challenges human containment". Reviewers for Asymptote Journal wrote that it was "a searing love song of longing, memory, and language," saying that the collection "propels itself smoothly between English and Arabic with erasure poetry, Arabic khatt, shape-poems, and English prose".

== Activism and Views ==
Ahmad Almallah is known as an advocate for Palestinian causes and has participated, along with several other faculty members, in campus activism related to the Israeli–Palestinian conflict. Following the outbreak of the 2023 Gaza war, he co-authored the poem “Holy Land, Wasted” with his wife, Professor Huda Fakhreddine, as a direct poetic response to the conflict. The poem, published in Literary Hub, reinterprets T. S. Eliot’s The Waste Land in the context of contemporary violence in Gaza and criticizes global silence toward Palestinian suffering.

Almallah, along with other faculty members, was among the organizers of pro-Palestinian demonstrations and protests on campus following the events of October 7, 2023. He stated that these demonstrations were part of a larger wave of activism related to the conflict. He led a crowd of protesters chanting "from the river to the sea Palestine will be free" and "when people are occupied resistance is justified" in an October 16, 2023 anti-Israel protest. In December 2023, Almallah participated in a rally on campus and led students in chanting "There is only one solution: intifada revolution" and "resistance is justified".

In 2024, Almallah was named by the U.S. House Committee on Education and the Workforce as one of several University of Pennsylvania faculty accused of making statements that were alleged to be “antisemitic” or supportive of Hamas. In August 2024, the university confirmed that it would cooperate with a congressional request to turn over the syllabi and CVs of Almallah, Fakhreddine, and other named professors. The university's compliance with the committee drew sharp criticism from the Middle East Studies Association (MESA), which accused Penn of undermining academic freedom by cooperating with a politically motivated investigation.

== Awards and honors ==
- Edith Goldberg Paulson Memorial Prize for Creative Writing.
- Blanche Colton Williams Fellowship (for Recourse).

== Personal life ==
Almallah is married to Huda Fakhreddine, a literary scholar and associate professor of Arabic Literature at the University of Pennsylvania. They collaborate on poetry readings and translations. The couple have a daughter.
