= Kate Rhodes =

British novelist, poet and academic

Kate Rhodes (born 1964, in London) is a British poet and novelist. She spent her childhood in Blackheath, South London. Her first job was as an usherette at Greenwich Theatre, which started her lifelong interest in drama. She spent a year living in Texas while studying for a PhD. on the work of Tennessee Williams at the University of Essex, Rhodes did numerous jobs before become a writer. She worked as an English teacher in a sixth form college and as a university lecturer. In 2004 she was granted a fellowship by the Hawthornden Literary Institute. Her debut collection Reversal was published in 2005 by Enitharmon Press. Reversal was the inaugural volume of the Enitharmon New Poets Series.

== Publications ==
=== Alice Quentin ===
- Crossbones Yard (2012, Mulholland Books)
- A Killing of Angels (2013, Mulholland Books)
- The Winter Foundlings (2014, Mulholland Books)
- River of Souls (2015, Mulholland Books)
- Blood Symmetry (2016, Mulholland Books)
- Fatal Harmony (2018, independently published)

=== Ben Kitto ===
- Hell Bay (2018, Simon & Schuster UK)
- Ruin Beach (2018, Simon & Schuster UK)
- Burnt Island (2019, Simon & Schuster UK)
- Pulpit Rock (2020, Simon & Schuster UK)
- Devil's Table (2021, Simon & Schuster UK)
- The Brutal Tide (2022, Simon & Schuster UK)
- Hangman Island (2023, Simon & Schuster UK)
- Deadman's Pool (2025, OrlandaBooks UK)
- The Mermaid's Cry (2026, OrlandaBooks UK)
