= Chitty (surname) =

Chitty is a surname, and may refer to:

- Chitty (cricketer) (fl. 1800), English cricketer
- Alison Chitty (born 1948), English set and costume designer
- Arthur Chitty (1859–1908), English barrister, entomologist and cricketer
- Clayton Chitty (born 1985), Canadian actor and model
- Bob Chitty (1916–1985), Australian footballer
- Dennis Chitty (1912–2010), Canadian zoologist
- Derwas Chitty (1901–1971), English Anglican priest
- Edward Chitty (1804–1863), English reporter, judge, and conchologist
- Elizabeth Chitty (born 1953), Canadian interdisciplinary artist
- Eric Chitty (1909–1990), Canadian speedway rider
- Erik Chitty (1907–1977), English film and television actor
- Ernest Chitty (1883–1948), New Zealand Anglican clergyman, tutor and organist
- Ewart Charles Chitty, member of the Governing Body of Jehovah's Witnesses and related offices
- George Edmund Chitty (1909–1974), Ceylonese lawyer
- Gritakumar E. Chitty (1939–2022), Sri Lankan jurist and career diplomat
- Jon Chitty, Royal Air Force officer
- José Antonio de Armas Chitty (1908–1995), Venezuelan historian, poet, chronicler, essayist, biographer and researcher
- Joseph Chitty (1775–1841), English lawyer and legal writer
- Joseph William Chitty (1828–1899), English cricketer, rower, judge and Liberal politician
- Letitia Chitty (1897–1982), English engineer
- Lily Chitty (1893–1979), English archaeologist and independent scholar
- Lyn Chitty, British physician
- Maureen Chitty (born 1947), British long jumper
- Peter Chitty (1912–1996), Australian footballer
- Stella Chitty (1928–2005), British stage manager
- Susan Chitty (1929–2021), English novelist and biographer
- Thomas Chitty (lawyer) (1802–1878), English lawyer and legal writer
- Sir Thomas Chitty, 1st Baronet (1855–1930), of the Chitty baronets
- Sir Thomas Chitty, 3rd Baronet (1926–2014), novelist
- Wilf Chitty (1912–1997), English footballer
