= Thomas Chitty =

Thomas Chitty may refer to:

- Thomas Chitty (lawyer) (1802–1878), English lawyer and legal writer
- Thomas Chitty (Lord Mayor of London), Lord Mayor of London
- Sir Thomas Chitty, 1st Baronet (1855–1930), of the Chitty baronets
- Sir (Thomas) Henry Willes Chitty, 2nd Baronet (1891–1955), of the Chitty baronets
- Sir Thomas Chitty, 3rd Baronet (1926–2014), novelist

== See also ==
- Chitty (disambiguation)
