= Bang Bang =

Bang Bang or Bang Bang Bang or similar may refer to:

== People ==
- Abdul Razzaq (cricketer) (born 1979), nicknamed Bang Bang Razzaq
- Bang Bang (Dubliner) (1906–1981), eccentric elderly gentleman in Dublin known for playing cowboy in the streets
- Bang-Bang Club, four photographers active in South Africa during the Apartheid period
- Keith "Bang Bang" McCurdy (born 1985), a celebrity tattoo artist

== Technology ==
- Bang-bang control, a controller that switches abruptly between two states
- Bang-bang robot, or pick and place robot
- Bang bang, Australian slang for a coffee knockbox

== Film, TV and entertainment ==
- Bang Bang (TV channel), Albanian TV channel
- "Bang-Bang" (CSI), 2006 episode of CSI: Crime Scene Investigation
- Bang Bang (telenovela), 2005 Brazilian TV series
- Bang Bang (2011 film), independent film by Byron Q
- Bang Bang!, 2014 Bollywood film
- Bang Bang! (play), comedy by John Cleese
- Bang, Bang, It's Reeves and Mortimer, UK comedy sketch series starring Vic and Bob
- Bang Bang, a character from The Hitchhiker's Guide to the Galaxy by Douglas Adams
- Bang Bang, character in the film The Brothers Bloom
- Bang Bang, fictional band in the film Brothers of the Head
- Mobile Legends: Bang Bang, multiplayer online battle arena mobile game
- Bang Bang, 2025 boxing film by Vincent Grashaw featuring Tim Blake Nelson

== Music ==
- Bang Bang Recordings, a record label created solely to release the album Five Minutes with Arctic Monkeys

=== Albums ===
- Bang Bang (Dal Shabet album)
- Bang Bang (Dispatch album)
- Bang Bang (Kelly Willis album)
- Bang Bang by Nazia and Zoheb
- Bang Bang! (soundtrack), for the 2014 film by Vishal–Shekhar
- Bang Bang Bang (Nitty Gritty Dirt Band album), and the title song
- Bang Bang Bang (Bad Boys Blue album)
- Bang! Bang! Bang! Bang! Bang! Bang! Bang!, by Brimstone Howl

=== Songs ===
- "Bang Bang" (BA Robertson song)
- "Bang Bang" (Danger Danger song)
- "Bang Bang" (DJ Fresh and Diplo song)
- "Bang Bang" (Green Day song)
- "Bang Bang" (Iggy Pop song), covered by David Bowie
- "Bang Bang" (Ive song)
- "Bang Bang" (Jessie J, Ariana Grande and Nicki Minaj song)
- "Bang Bang" (Kardinal Offishall song)
- "Bang Bang" (Lartiste song)
- "Bang Bang" (Melanie Fiona song)
- "Bang Bang" (Rita Ora and Imanbek song)
- "Bang Bang" (Squeeze song)
- "Bang Bang" (will.i.am song)
- "Bang Bang (My Baby Shot Me Down)", a song by Cher, later covered by Nancy Sinatra and Bonzo Dog Doo-Dah Band; also, Vanilla Fudge 1967
- "Bang Bang", by Dr. Dre from 2001
- "Bang Bang", by Felix Jaehn and Leony, 2025
- "Bang Bang", by Hollywood Undead from Five
- "Bang Bang", by the Joe Cuba Sextet, also covered by jazz artist David Sanborn
- "Bang Bang", by K'naan from Troubadour
- "Bang Bang", by Lady Sovereign from Jigsaw
- "Bang! Bang!", by Le Tigre from From the Desk of Mr. Lady
- "Bang! Bang!", by Liz Phair from Funstyle
- "Bang Bang", by Lynyrd Skynyrd from God & Guns
- "Bang Bang", by Reks from REBELutionary
- "Bang Bang", by Story of the Year from Wolves
- "Bang Bang", by Thanh Lan
- "Bang Bang", by Young Buck from Straight Outta Cashville
- "Bang Bang (Balls of Fire)", a song by Kix from Midnite Dynamite
- "Bang, Bang (Stick 'Em Up)", a song by The Bar-Kays from Too Hot to Stop
- "Bang Bang Bang" (Big Bang song)
- "Bang Bang Bang" (Mark Ronson song)
- "Bang Bang Bang" (Selena Gomez & the Scene song)
- "Bang Bang Bang", a song by Christina Perri from lovestrong
- "Bang Bang Bang Bang", a song by John Lee Hooker from If You Miss 'Im...I Got 'Im
- "Bang Bang Bang Bang", by Sohodolls from Ribbed Music for the Numb Generation

== Other uses ==
- Bang bang chicken, a Chinese dish
- Bang Bang Oriental Foodhall, in Colindale, London, on the site of the former Oriental City
- Bang Bang Jump Up, a hill in Queensland, Australia

== See also ==
- Bam Bam (disambiguation)
- Bang (disambiguation)
- Bang Bang You're Dead (disambiguation)
- Chitty Chitty Bang Bang (disambiguation)
- Kiss Kiss Bang Bang (disambiguation)
