= Carmen Callil =

Australian publisher and writer (1938–2022)

Dame Carmen Callil DBE FRSL
- Born: Carmen Thérèse Fakhry Callil; 15 July 1938; Melbourne, Victoria, Australia
- Died: 18 October 2022 (aged 84); London, England
- Education: Star of the Sea Convent; Loreto Mandeville Hall; University of Melbourne (BA)
- Occupations: Publisher; writer; critic
- Known for: Founder of Virago Press
- Notable work: Bad Faith: A Forgotten History of Family & Fatherland (2006)
- Awards: Benson Medal

Dame Carmen Thérèse Fakhry Callil, DBE, FRSL (15 July 1938 – 18 October 2022) was an Australian publisher, writer and critic who spent most of her career in the United Kingdom. She founded Virago Press in 1973 and received the Benson Medal from the Royal Society of Literature in 2017. She has been described by Gail Rebuck as "the most extraordinary publisher of her generation".

== Early life and education ==
Callil was born in Melbourne, Victoria, Australia, on 15 July 1938. Her father, Frederick Alfred Louis Callil, was a barrister and lecturer in French at the University of Melbourne who died when Callil was eight years old. He was of Lebanese descent; his father claimed to be the first Lebanese person to emigrate to Australia. Her widowed mother, Lorraine Clare Allen, raised four children, of whom Callil was the third.

She was educated at Star of the Sea Convent and at Loreto Mandeville Hall. She then studied at the University of Melbourne, graduating with a Bachelor of Arts degree in History and Literature in 1960. She emigrated from Australia one week later and settled in London.

== Career ==
In the same year she left for Europe, and, after a period in Italy, settled in London in 1964. She worked for Marks & Spencer as a buying assistant, then, after placing an advertisement in The Times ("Australian, B.A. wants job in book publishing"), began work at Hutchinson in 1965.

From 1967 to 1970, she was publicity manager of the paperback imprint Panther Books. An example of her work was when Callil lobbied BBC producer Lorna Pegram to employ B. S. Johnson to talk about his 1969 book The Unfortunates for the TV series Release. Johnson's book had eight parts that could be read in many different orders. With barely any negotiation, the interview was ready months before the book was ready for publication. The film included Johnson holding a mock-up of the book that was not at all similar to the final publication.

Callil later took responsibility for all imprints of Granada Publishing, and then at Anthony Blond and André Deutsch. She left to work for Ink, a countercultural newspaper founded by Richard Neville, Andrew Fisher, Felix Dennis and Ed Victor in 1971. Ink was an offshoot of Oz and was intended to be a bridge between the underground press of the 1960s and the national newspapers of that time. Launched in May 1971, it collapsed in February 1972, following the Oz obscenity trial.

At Ink, Callil met Marsha Rowe and Rosie Boycott, who founded the feminist magazine Spare Rib in June 1972. In 1973, Callil founded Virago Press (initially known as Spare Rib Books), to "publish books which celebrated women and women's lives, and which would, by so doing, spread the message of women's liberation to the whole population", through the work of new and neglected women writers. Rowe and Boycott became directors of Virago in its first years.

Also in 1972, Callil launched a book publicity company, Carmen Callil Limited. Harriet Spicer became Callil's assistant. This company, run by Spicer and Callil, helped to finance Virago in its early years, together with Callil's inheritance from her grandfather. Further assistance came from Quartet Books, with whom the first nine Virago titles were published. Ursula Owen became a part-time editor in 1974, before becoming a full-time director later that year, with considerable responsibility for the content of the Virago publishing list. In 1976, Virago became an independent company, with Callil, Owen and Spicer as directors, shortly to be joined by Lennie Goodings and Alexandra Pringle.

In 1982, Callil was appointed managing director of Chatto & Windus (which had acquired Virago), where she remained until 1994, continuing also as chairman of Virago until 1995. In 1994, she was Editor-At-Large for the worldwide group of Random House publishing companies. At Virago, among other business and editorial aspects of the company she was responsible for the creation and development of the Virago Modern Classics list (choosing a distinctive green colour for the books' spines), which brought back into print many hundreds of the best women's works of the past.

Callil left book publishing in 1994, and for some years divided her time between London and Caunes-Minervois in France. As a writer and critic, she has contributed reviews and features to many newspapers and journals, in addition to undertaking occasional radio and television work. From 1985 to 1991, she was a member of the Board of Channel 4 Television.

In 1996, Callil chaired the Booker Prize for Fiction panel of judges, which included Jonathan Coe, Ian Jack, A. L. Kennedy and A. N. Wilson. She was a judge for the 2011 Man Booker International Prize but resigned in protest after her co-judges Rick Gekoski and Justin Cartwright chose Philip Roth as the winner.

Callil's 2006 book, Bad Faith: A Forgotten History of Family & Fatherland, told the story of Dr Anne Darquier, for seven years Callil's psychiatrist until her suicide in 1970, after which came "the shocking revelation that her father had been Louis Darquier de Pellepoix, Commissioner for Jewish Affairs in Vichy France and known as the French Eichmann." Callil's book was well reviewed and shortlisted for the Samuel Johnson Prize, having involved extensive research carried out on several continents, as Callil "set herself the task of dealing out retroactive justice, not only for Darquier's heinous actions as a Nazi collaborator, but also for the dark, immovable shadow he cast over his daughter's life."

In 2010, Callil was elected a fellow of the Royal Society of Literature (RSL). In 2017, she was awarded the RSL's Benson Medal for exceptional contribution to literature, alongside Mary-Kay Wilmers and Margaret Busby. In 2018, Callil featured in the exhibition Rights for Women: London's Pioneers in their Own Words, staged at Senate House Library, University of London.

In her 2020 book,Oh Happy Day: Those Times and These Times, Callil "traced the turbulent history of her British ancestors from impoverished working class to deportation to Australia for petty crimes." As The Herald's reviewer acknowledges: "In research terms, Oh Happy Day is a phenomenal achievement. Callil ... has dug deep into books, newspapers, historical archives, parish records and court documents to provide a meticulous account not only of the lives of her relatives who were 'busy insects of the yearly industrial revolution', but also of the broader historical context." Peter Conrad's review in The Observer concluded: "In its often tearful compassion, its eloquent rage and its vengeful delight in proletarian snook-cocking, Oh Happy Day deserves to be called Dickensian."

== Death ==
Callil died of acute leukaemia at her home in Notting Dale, London, on 18 October 2022, aged 84. She had been working on a personal memoir, which she did not complete.

== Honours and recognition ==
- 1989: recipient of the Distinguished Service Award from the International Women's Writing Guild
- 1994: recipient of honorary degree (Hon LittD) from the University of Sheffield
- 1995: conferred with honorary degree, Doctor of Letters (HonDLitt), from Oxford Brookes University
- 1995: received an honorary degree (DUniv) from the University of York
- 1997: awarded honorary doctorate from the Open University
- 2010: elected a Fellow of the Royal Society of Literature (RSL)
- 2017: awarded the Benson Medal by the RSL
- 2017: appointed Dame Commander of the Order of the British Empire (DBE)

== Publications ==
- Lebanese Washing Stories, New Writing 5, The British Council/Vintage, 1996
- With Craig Raine (editors), New Writing 7, The British Council/Vintage, 1998; ISBN 0-09-954561-6
- With Colm Tóibín: The Modern Library: The Best 200 Novels in English since 1950, Picador, 1999; ISBN 0-330-34182-0
- Bad Faith: A Forgotten History of Family & Fatherland, Jonathan Cape & Alfred A. Knopf, 2006; Buchet Chastel, 2007.
- Oh Happy Day: Those Times and These Times, London: Jonathan Cape, 2020; ISBN 978-0224090308; Vintage paperback, ISBN 978-0099548560.
