= Unearthing Suite =

Short story by Margaret Atwood

"Unearthing Suite" is a short story by Margaret Atwood.

In 1983, it was published as a limited edition small press book and was included in her short story collection Bluebeard's Egg.
