= Lennie Goodings =

Canadian-born publisher active in the UK (born 1953)

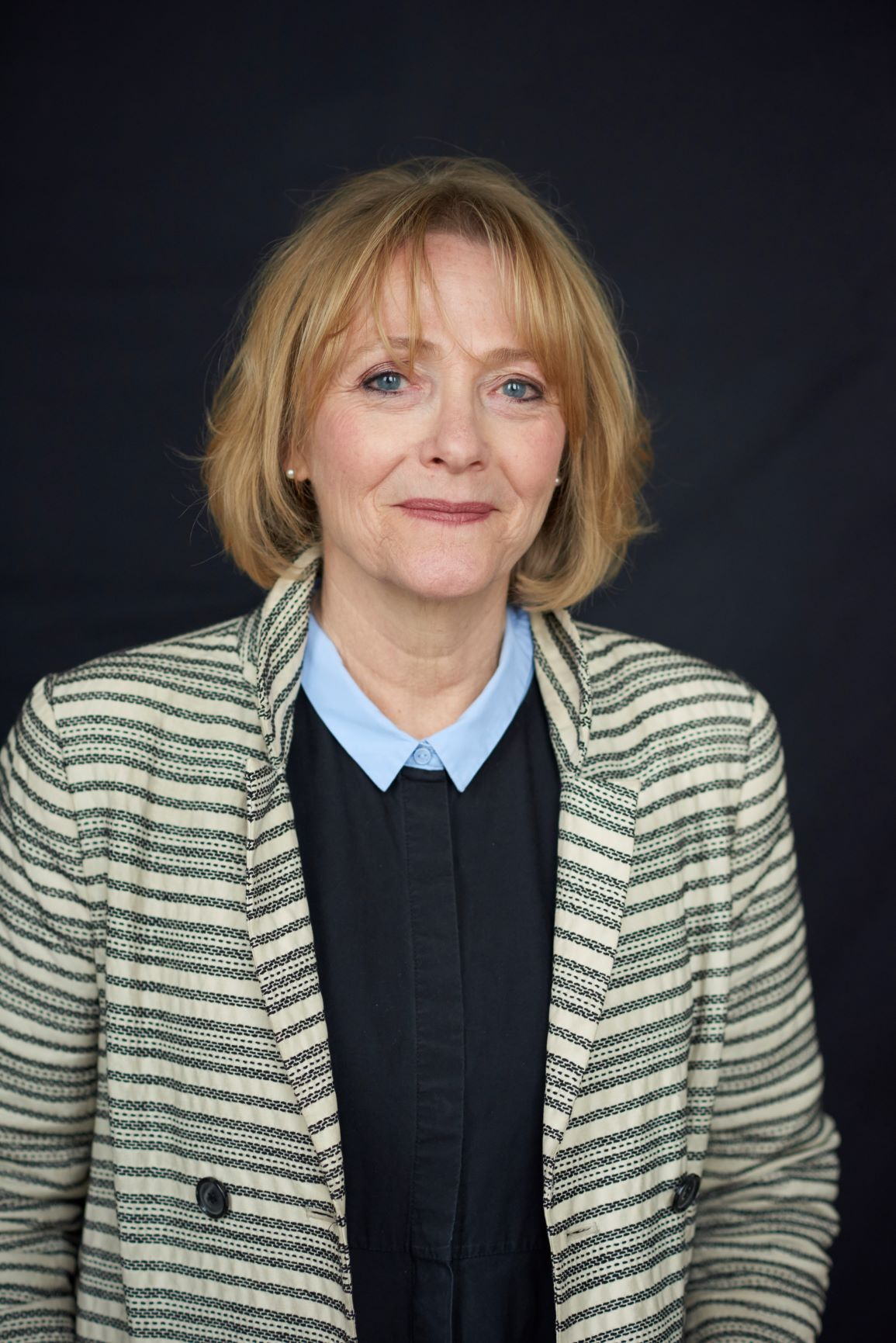
- Born: 1953 (age 72–73); Cornwall, Ontario, Canada
- Education: Queen's University
- Occupation: Publisher
- Known for: Chair of Virago Press
- Children: 2

Lennie Goodings (born 1953) is a Canadian-born publisher active in the United Kingdom. She is Chair of the UK British publishing house Virago Press.

Her authors include Margaret Atwood, Maya Angelou, Sandi Toksvig, Sarah Dunant, Sarah Waters, Naomi Wolf, Linda Grant, Natasha Walter, Lyndall Gordon, Shirley Hazzard, Joan Bakewell, Shirley Williams, Rachel Seiffert and Marilynne Robinson.

== Early life ==
Lennie Goodings was born in Cornwall, Ontario, Canada, in 1953. Her father was a civil engineer and her mother, a nurse; she has four younger siblings. When she was 20, she was on a fatal raft trip on the rapids of the Niagara River that was the basis of a story in Margaret Atwood's collection Bluebeard's Egg.

At Queen's University, in Kingston, Ontario, Goodings studied Film and English literature, arriving in London in 1977. She is married with two (now adult) children, Amy and Zachary.

== Career ==
Goodings has worked for Virago Press since 1978, through all its ownership changes. Virago was founded in 1973 by Carmen Callil, who was convinced an imprint devoted to women's writing, lives and concerns, could be both financially viable and an inspiration. Virago is now an imprint at Little, Brown, owned by Hachette.

Beginning as publicist, Goodings continued to hold this position when the company became part of the British group Chatto, Virago, Bodley Head and Cape until it was sold to Random House, USA. She was part of Virago's management-buy-out team in 1987, becoming the Publishing Director in 1992. Goodings remained as Publisher and editorial director when, after eight years of independence, the company was sold to Little, Brown in 1995. She became Virago Chair in 2017 and appointed Sarah Savitt as Publisher. In 2006, Virago and Little, Brown became part of The Hachette Book Group.

Goodings is the author of a children's book entitled When I Grow Up. Her memoir A Bite of the Apple: Behind the Scenes at Virago Press was published in February 2020 by Oxford University Press.

She has been a trustee of English PEN and is a board member of the charity Poet in the City.

== Awards and honours ==
Goodings received The Bookseller's Industry Award: Editor and Imprint of the Year in 2010 and was awarded an Honorary Doctorate from Queen's University in Canada in 2004 and A Lifetime's Achievement at WOW (Women of the World Festival) in 2018.
