= Chitty (disambiguation) =

The Chitty are a distinctive group of Tamil people found mainly in Malacca and Singapore.

Chitty may also refer to:

== People ==
- Chitty (surname)
- Chitty baronets

== Other ==
- Chitty Street, a street in the London Borough of Camden
- A small piece of paper, usually a note, contract or voucher

== See also ==
- Chitty Chitty Bang Bang (disambiguation)
- Chetty
