= Frost in May =

Novel by Antonia White

First edition (publ. Desmond Harmsworth)

Frost in May is a 1933 novel by the British author Antonia White that was reissued in 1978 as the first book in Virago Press's Modern Classics series of books by neglected women authors.

== Background ==
Frost in May, first published in 1933 with an introduction by Elizabeth Bowen (and publicly praised by Evelyn Waugh), was based on White's years at a convent school in pre-World-War-I England. That was not an entirely happy time for White, and her mixed experiences are reflected in the novel. White began a version of Frost in May while at the convent, but it was discovered and confiscated and led to White's expulsion from the school — an episode that reappears fictionalized in the novel.

It was reissued by Virago Press in 1978 as the first in its Modern Classics series of new editions of out-of-print books by neglected women authors. It was also adapted as a 1982 BBC television mini-series.

== Plot summary ==
The novel opens as its 9-year-old protagonist, Fernanda 'Nanda' Grey, is on her way to the Roman Catholic Convent of the Five Wounds outside London, where she will live and get her schooling until she is forced out at the age of 13. Although her mother dislikes the school's hermetic culture, Nanda is initially more influenced by her father, a recent convert to Catholicism. Told solely from Nanda's point of view, the novel unspools in part through Nanda's inner reflections as she attempts to come to terms with the requirements of daily life at the convent. During the course of the story, Nanda begins to write her first novel. When the nuns eventually discover this manuscript they are horrified by it, and Frost in May ends with Nanda leaving the convent.

In Frost in May, White explores the attractions of a romanticized Catholicism for a young girl while condemning the school's absolutist and punitive culture. At the convent school, everything the girls do is heavily controlled, from their censored letters home to the way they are expected to fold their clothes. A major theme of the novel is the many ways in which patriarchal authority is exercised: by Nanda's father, by the convent's priest, and by the nuns themselves. Through specific episodes of Nanda's life, White explores the "petty cruelty, and ... the institutionalised power of symbols and community pressure." Much of the tension in this coming-of-age story stems from Fernanda's increasing discontent as she grows away from the values, beliefs, and practices of the convent school world.
