= Virago Press =

Publisher of women's writing and books on feminist topics

Virago
- Parent company: Hachette Livre
- Founded: 1973; 53 years ago
- Founder: Carmen Callil
- Country of origin: United Kingdom
- Key people: Lennie Goodings (editor); Ursula Owen (founding director)
- Nonfiction topics: Feminism
- Official website: https://www.virago.co.uk/

Virago is a British publisher of women's writing and books on feminist topics. Started and run by women in the 1970s and bolstered by the success of the Women's Liberation Movement (WLM), Virago has been credited as one of several British feminist presses that helped address inequitable gender dynamics in publishing. Unlike alternative, anti-capitalist publishing projects and political pamphlets coming out of feminist collectives and socialist circles, Virago branded itself as a commercial alternative to the male-dominated publishing industry and sought to compete with mainstream international presses.

== History ==
Virago was founded in 1973 by Carmen Callil, primarily to publish books by women writers. It was originally known as Spare Rib Books, sharing a name with the most famous magazine of the British women's liberation movement or second-wave feminism. The first issue of Spare Rib magazine, whose founders included Rosie Boycott and Marsha Rowe, was published in June 1972. From the start, Virago published two sorts of books: original works, and out-of-print books by neglected female writers. The latter were reissued under the "Modern Classics" insignia, which launched in 1978 with Frost in May, a novel by the British author Antonia White originally published in 1933. The Virago list also contains works with feminist themes by male authors, such as H. G. Wells. Valentine Cunningham has praised Virago for trawling "most impressively and fruitfully in the novel catalogues" of the 1930s for women's fiction to reprint.

In 1982, Virago became a wholly owned subsidiary of the Chatto, Virago, Bodley Head, and Cape Group (CVBC), but in 1987 Callil, Lennie Goodings, Ursula Owen, Alexandra Pringle, and Harriet Spicer put together a management buy-out from CVBC, then owned by Random House, USA. The buy-out was financed by Rothschild Ventures and Robert Gavron. Random House UK kept a ten percent stake in the company, and continued to handle sales and distribution. In 1993, Rothschild Ventures sold their shares to the directors and Gavron, who thus became the largest single shareholder.

After a downturn in the market forced a reduction in activity, the board decided to sell the company to Little, Brown, of which Virago became an imprint in 1996 (with Lennie Goodings as publisher and Sally Abbey as senior editor). The sale to Little, Brown, a large company owned by the media giant Time Warner, was met with negative publicity and raised questions about the future of feminist publishing houses. In 2006, Little, Brown, Virago's parent company, became part of publishing group Hachette Livre. Lennie Goodings remains as editor and publisher.

== Legacy ==
In 2008, the British Library acquired the Virago Press archive, consisting of organisational papers, author/editor files, publicity materials and photographs.

Virago was the subject of an hour-long BBC Four television documentary, Virago: Changing the World One Page at a Time, that was first broadcast in October 2016.

== Notable authors ==
- Maya Angelou
- Margaret Atwood
- Beatrix Campbell
- Angela Carter
- Barbara Comyns
- Daphne du Maurier
- Eva Figes
- Zora Neale Hurston
- Kate Millett
- Juliet Mitchell
- Adrienne Rich
- Sheila Rowbotham
- Lynne Segal
- Rachel Seiffert
- Elaine Showalter
- Melanie Silgardo (also editor)
- Carolyn Steedman
- Barbara Taylor
- Sylvia Townsend Warner
- Antonia White
- Naomi Wolf
