= Agnes Macdonell =

British writer and journalist

- Born: Agnes Harrison; Circa 1840
- Died: 20 January 1925; Edinburgh, Scotland
- Occupation: Journalist

Agnes Macdonell (née Harrison; c. 1840 – 20 January 1925) was a British writer and journalist.

== Biography ==
Agnes Macdonell was the daughter of Daniel Harrison of Shirley House, Beckenham. She lived in the United States of America during the Civil War period. In 1873, she married John Macdonell and, according to her obituary in The Times, "was her husband's right hand in all his work, bringing to this her swift sympathy of mind and wise judgment". The Macdonells had two daughters.

Macdonell was a keen Shakespeare student, and well-read. She published many novels, including Quaker Cousins, For the King's Dues, and Martin's Vineyard, and contributed many stories and articles to The Contemporary Review and The Atlantic. She is listed as a suffragist in The Women's Suffrage Movement in Britain and Ireland: A Regional Survey.

== Publications ==
- Martin's Vineyard (1872)
- For the King's Dues (1874)
- Quaker Cousins (1879) in 3 vols.
- Macdonell, James (1841-1879) in the Dictionary of National Biography
- "America Then and Now: Recollections of Lincoln" in The Contemporary Review (May 1917)
