= Vernon Wijetunga =

Ceylonese civil lawyer

Vernon Wijetunga QC (September 1920 - 28 December 2008) was a prominent Ceylonese civil lawyer. He was the last surviving Queen's Counsel in Sri Lanka.

Educated at Royal College Colombo, he excelled in athletics and boxing, as well as studies winning the Sir Donald Obeysekere Prize. Entering Ceylon Law College, he enrolled as an advocate in 1943 and was later admitted as a barrister in the Gray's Inn. He apprenticed under M. T. de S Amarasekere, KC; Sir Ukwatte Jayasundera, KC and George Edmund Chitty, QC.

Starting his practice in the unofficial bar, he practiced in both the original and appellate courts. Later, he specialised in civil litigation in the District Courts. He was appointed a Queen's Counsel in 1968.

He married Pamela Wijewardene, daughter of Dr. D. E. Wijewarden (a brother of D. R. Wijewardena), in 1948. She was the sister of Ray Wijewardene. They had two sons, Varuna and Susil, a daughter, Ramya and a younger son, Sathis. Wijetunga was a member of the Royal Asiatic Society of Sri Lanka.
