= Susan Chitty =

English novelist and biographist (1929–2021)

Susan, Lady Chitty (née Hopkinson; 18 August 1929 – 13 July 2021) was an English novelist and a writer of biographies. Her memoir on her mother, which was viewed as a "literary assassination", caused an uproar with writers and family.

== Early life ==
Her mother was Antonia White, a famed novelist, and her father was Rudolph Glossop, a geologist, with whom White had had an affair; Susan did not know the true identity of her father until she was seven years old. Soon after birth, she was sent to a children's home. Her half-sister, Lyndall, was born eight months after Susan. Lyndall's father was though to be Tom Hopkinson, who later adopted Susan and she returned to live with him and her mother. DNA tests taken years later show that she and Lyndall had the same father, Rudolph Glossop.

Susan was educated at Godolphin School. Afterwards, she won a scholarship to Somerville College, Oxford, to study history. Owing to a mental health crisis, she did not complete her degree.

She married Thomas Chitty, another novelist (who used the pen name Thomas Hinde), in 1951, after meeting him at Oxford. He would later succeed his father as the 3rd Chitty baronet. The couple had four children; three daughters and a son.

== Career ==
She published her first book in 1958, entitled Diary of a Fashion Model. The book was based on her experiences working as a writer for Vogue. She had joined the magazine after winning a talent contest in 1952. She left Vogue after giving birth to her first child. She and her husband purchased Bow Cottage, West Hoathly, West Sussex, where the two of them would write. The couple published one book together on their travels with two of their children from Santiago de Compostela, Spain, to Greece. They traveled on foot and by donkey. They also wrote On Next to Nothing, a how-to guide on living cheaply.

Chitty took her childhood love of horses and wrote two books on the care of them. She wrote her first biography on Anna Sewell, who wrote Black Beauty, in 1972. This was the start of her writing biographies, mostly on Victorian era figures including Charles Kingsley, Sir Henry Newbolt, and Gwen John.

Her most notable and controversial book was about her mother Now to My Mother: A Very Personal Memoir of Antonia White, published in 1985, five years after her mother's death. She claimed that her mother was an emotional abuser to her and her sister. The Daily Telegraph would later call the memoir a "literary assassination" against White's work and career. The book sparked a bitter reaction from her sister Lyndall Hopkinson, who published her own memoir a year later to dispute Susan's recollection. Germaine Greer, during a discussion on literary biographies, attacked what Chitty had written. After a prolonged legal battle with her sister and executor of her mother's estate, Chitty was able to edit and publish her mother's diaries.

== Later life ==
She published her last book in 1997 on Sir Henry Newbolt. Her husband Thomas died in 2014. She died after a short illness in July 2021.

== Published works ==
=== Novels ===
- The Diary of a Fashion Model (1958)
- White Huntress (1963)
- My Life and Horses (1966)

=== Non-fiction ===
- The Intelligent Woman's Guide to Good Taste (1958)
- The Woman Who Wrote Black Beauty: A Life of Anna Sewell (1972)
- The Beast and the Monk: A Life of Charles Kingsley (1975)
- The Puffin Book of Horses (1975); co-written with Anne Parry
- Charles Kingsley’s Landscape (1976)
- The Great Donkey Walk − From Spain to Greece by Pilgrim Ways and Mule Tracks (1977); co-written with her husband.
- The Young Rider (1979)
- Gwen John (1981)
- Lear (1986)
- That Singular Person Called Lear (1988)
- Playing the Game (1997)

=== Memoirs ===
- Now to My Mother: A Very Personal Memoir of Antonia White (1985)
