= Ukwatte Jayasundera =

Sri Lankan politician

Sir Ukwatte Acharige Jayasundera KCMG KBE QC was a prominent Ceylonese criminal lawyer and politician.

== Early life and legal career ==
Born in Kalutara, Jayasundera was educated at Sri Sumangala College, Panadura, he was the first in the school to gain admission to the Ceylon Law College and to become an Advocate of the Supreme Court of Ceylon. He developed a successful practice as a criminal lawyer and was appointed a King's Counsel in 1949.

== Political career ==
He was elected the first General Secretary of the United National Party, and was appointed to the Senate of Ceylon. Following the unexpected death of D. S. Senanayake on 22 March 1952, Sir Oliver Goonetilleke and Sir Ukwatte Jayasundera negotiated within the party the successful succession of his son Dudley Senanayake to the post of Prime Minister of Ceylon. In his capacity as party general secretary he advised Sir John Kotelawala, who had succeeded Dudley Senanayake as Prime Minister to call for early elections in 1956, before the end of the parliamentary term, resulting in an unprecedented defeat of the United National Party by Mahajana Eksath Peramuna led by S. W. R. D. Bandaranaike.

== Honors ==
Appointed a King's Counsel in 1949, he was made a Commander of the Order of the British Empire (CBE) in the 1950 New Year Honours. He was knighted as a Knights Bachelor in the 1951 Birthday Honours, appointed Knight Commander of the Order of the British Empire (KBE) in the 1953 Coronation Honours and appointed a Knight Commander of the Order of St Michael and St George (KCMG) in the 1955 Birthday Honours for political and public services.

== See also ==
- Vernon Wijetunga
