= Gritakumar E. Chitty =

Sri Lankan sport shooter (1939–2022)

Gritakumar E. Chitty (14 June 1939 – 6 January 2022) was a Sri Lankan jurist and career diplomat at the United Nations. He was the founding Registrar of the International Tribunal for the Law of the Sea. After retiring from the United Nations and International Tribunal for the Law of the Sea, Chitty worked for the Government of Sri Lanka as a member of the National Ocean Affairs Commission, serving as its Chairman prior to 2017.

== Early life and education ==
He was born in British Ceylon to George Edmund Chitty QC, a Sri Lankan criminal attorney. His wife was Leila Ratnam, the daughter of Dr. E. V. Ratnam, the founder of Ratnam's Private Hospital, and paternal niece of Dr. Kumaran Ratnam, Mayor of Colombo (1950). He was a Colombo Chetty of Indian, French, and Sri Lankan ancestry.

Chitty was educated at Royal College, Colombo and later joined the Law Faculty of the University of Ceylon, which he graduated in 1965. Following which in 1967, he joined the Sri Lanka Law College to sit for the Attorney's exam, and took oaths the following year as an advocate.

== Career ==
Having joined the unofficial bar and starting his legal practice in 1968, he entered the service of the United Nations Office of Law of the Sea and Ocean Affairs in 1975, under the Office of Legal Affairs, serving until 1996, and was responsible for dispute resolution in maritime law. In addition, he was planning the 1993/1994 inaugural ceremony of the International Criminal Tribunal for the former Yugoslavia charged. Even with the establishment of the International Tribunal, he was entrusted mainly and served in the transitional phase between August and October 1996 as executive director.

== Other interests ==
Gritakumar E. Chitty was an amateur photographer. He was a Committee Member of the Photographic Society of Ceylon and has exhibited both nationally and internationally in Salon photography. Chitty represented Sri Lanka at the Asian Games and was a private entry at the World Shooting Championships in Wiesbaden, Germany in 1966, where he placed 110th with a score of 578 in the 60 shots prone.

== Personal life and death ==
Chitty married Shanta P. David in 1968, and had a daughter, Shonine, and a son, Gitendra. He resided in the United States and Sri Lanka. He died on 6 January 2022, at the age of 82.

== Bibliography ==
Gritakumar E. Chitty. In: International Tribunal for the Law of the Sea. Yearbook 2001. Martinus Nijhoff Publishers, Den Haag 2003, ISBN 90-411-2067-X, S. 97/98

== See also ==
- Colombo Chetty
