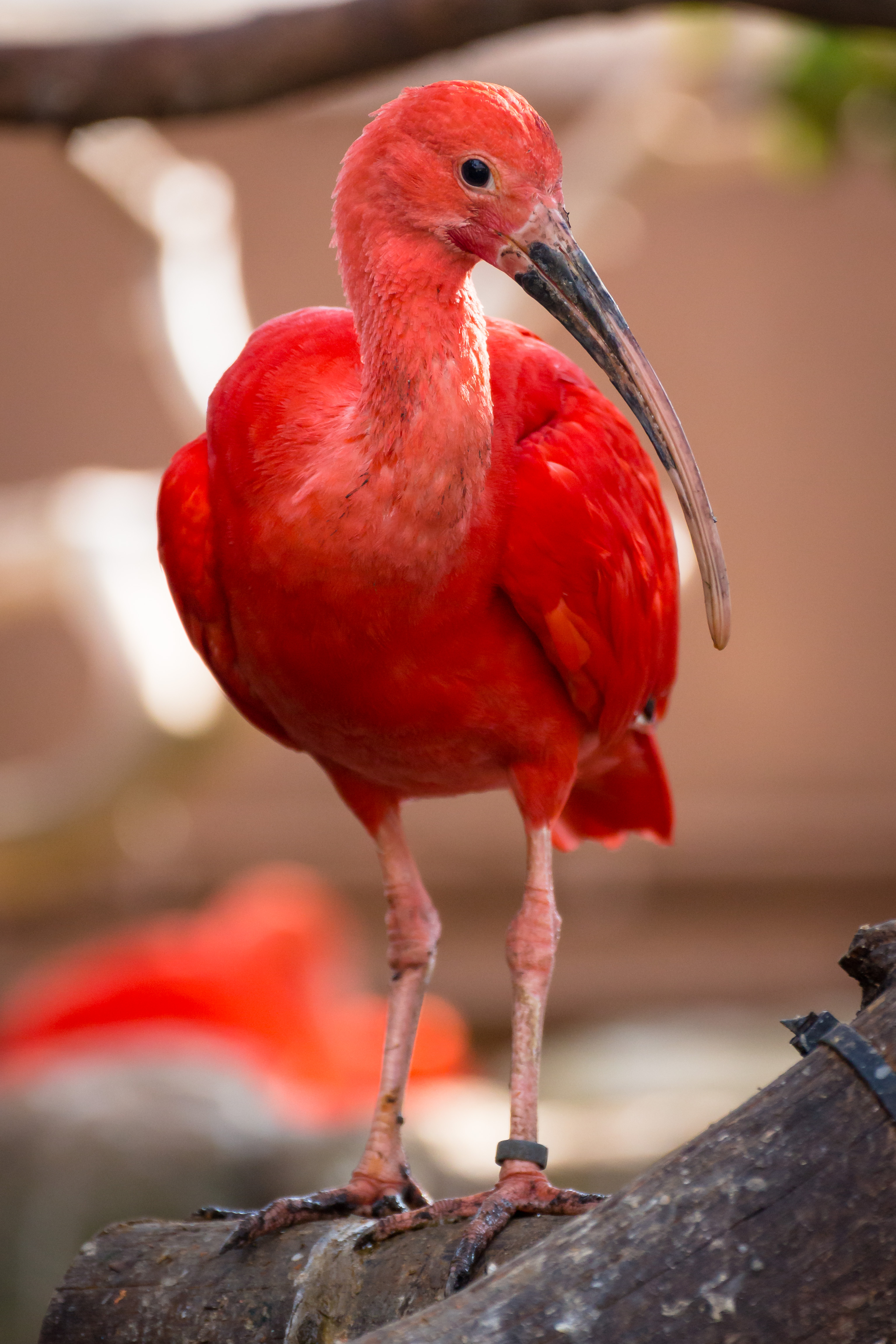
- A scarlet ibis at L'Oceanogràfic

Conservation status
- Least Concern (IUCN 3.1)
- CITES Appendix II

Scientific classification
- Kingdom: Animalia
- Phylum: Chordata
- Class: Aves
- Order: Pelecaniformes
- Family: Threskiornithidae
- Genus: Eudocimus
- Species: E. ruber

Binomial name
- Eudocimus ruber (Linnaeus, 1758)

Synonyms
- Scolopax rubra Linnaeus, 1758; Tantalus ruber Linnaeus, 1766

= Scarlet ibis =

Species of bird

The scarlet ibis, sometimes called red ibis (Eudocimus ruber), is a species of ibis in the bird family Threskiornithidae. It inhabits tropical South America and part of the Caribbean. In form, it resembles most of the other twenty-seven extant species of ibis, but its remarkably brilliant scarlet coloration makes it unmistakable. It is one of the two national birds of Trinidad and Tobago, and its Tupi–Guarani name, guará, is part of the name of several municipalities along the coast of Brazil.

This medium-sized wading bird is hardy, numerous, and prolific, and it has protected status around the world. Its IUCN status is Least Concern. The legitimacy of Eudocimus ruber as a biological classification, however, is in dispute. Traditional Linnaean taxonomy classifies it as a unique species, but some scientists have moved to reclassify it as a subspecies of a more general American ibis species, along with its close relative, the American white ibis (Eudocimus albus).

== Taxonomy ==
The species was first classified by Carl Linnaeus in 1758. Initially given the binomial nomenclature of Scolopax rubra (the name incorporates the Latin adjective ruber, "red"), the species was later designated Guara rubra and ultimately Eudocimus ruber.

Biologically the scarlet ibis is very closely related to the American white ibis (Eudocimus albus) and is sometimes considered conspecific with it, leaving modern science divided over their taxonomy. The two birds each have exactly the same bones, claws, beaks, feather arrangements and other features – their one marked difference lies in their pigmentation. Traditional taxonomy has regarded the two as distinct.

Early ornithological field research revealed no natural crossbreeding among the red and white, lending support to the two-species viewpoint. More recent observation, however, has documented significant crossbreeding and hybridization in the wild. Researchers Cristina Ramo and Benjamin Busto found evidence of interbreeding in a population where the ranges of the scarlet and white ibises overlap along the coast and in the Llanos in Colombia and Venezuela. They observed individuals of the two species mating and pairing, as well as hybrid ibises with pale orange plumage, or white plumage with occasional orange feathers, and have proposed that these birds be classified as a single species. Hybridization has been known to occur frequently in captivity. However, the two color forms persist in the wild despite overlapping ranges and hybrid offspring having a distinctive color type, so according to the cohesion species concept they would be functionally different species.

Some biologists now wish to pair them with Eudocimus albus as two subspecies of the same American ibis. Others simply define both of them as one and the same species, with ruber being a color variation of albus.

== Description ==
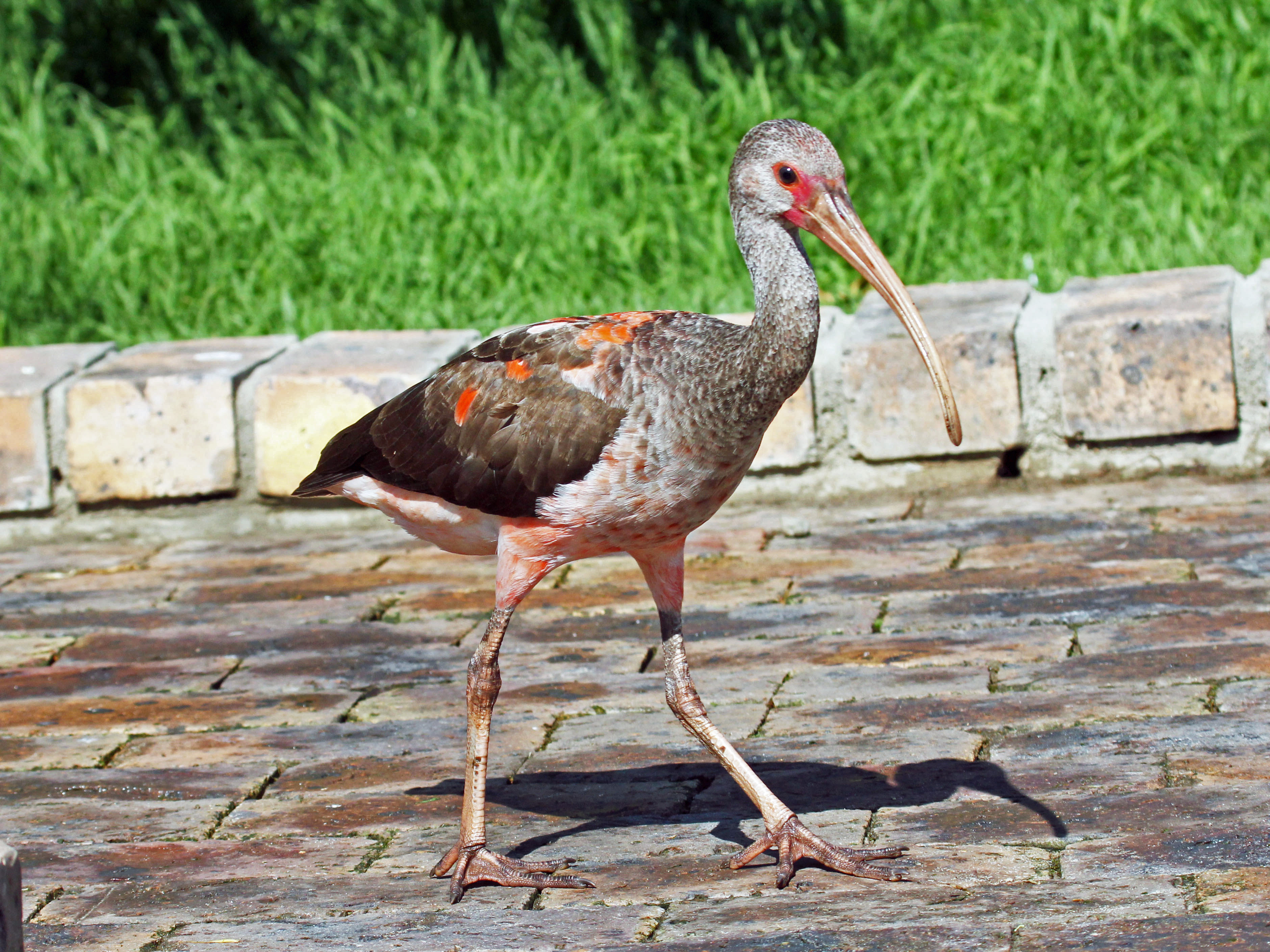
An older juvenile with a touch of red

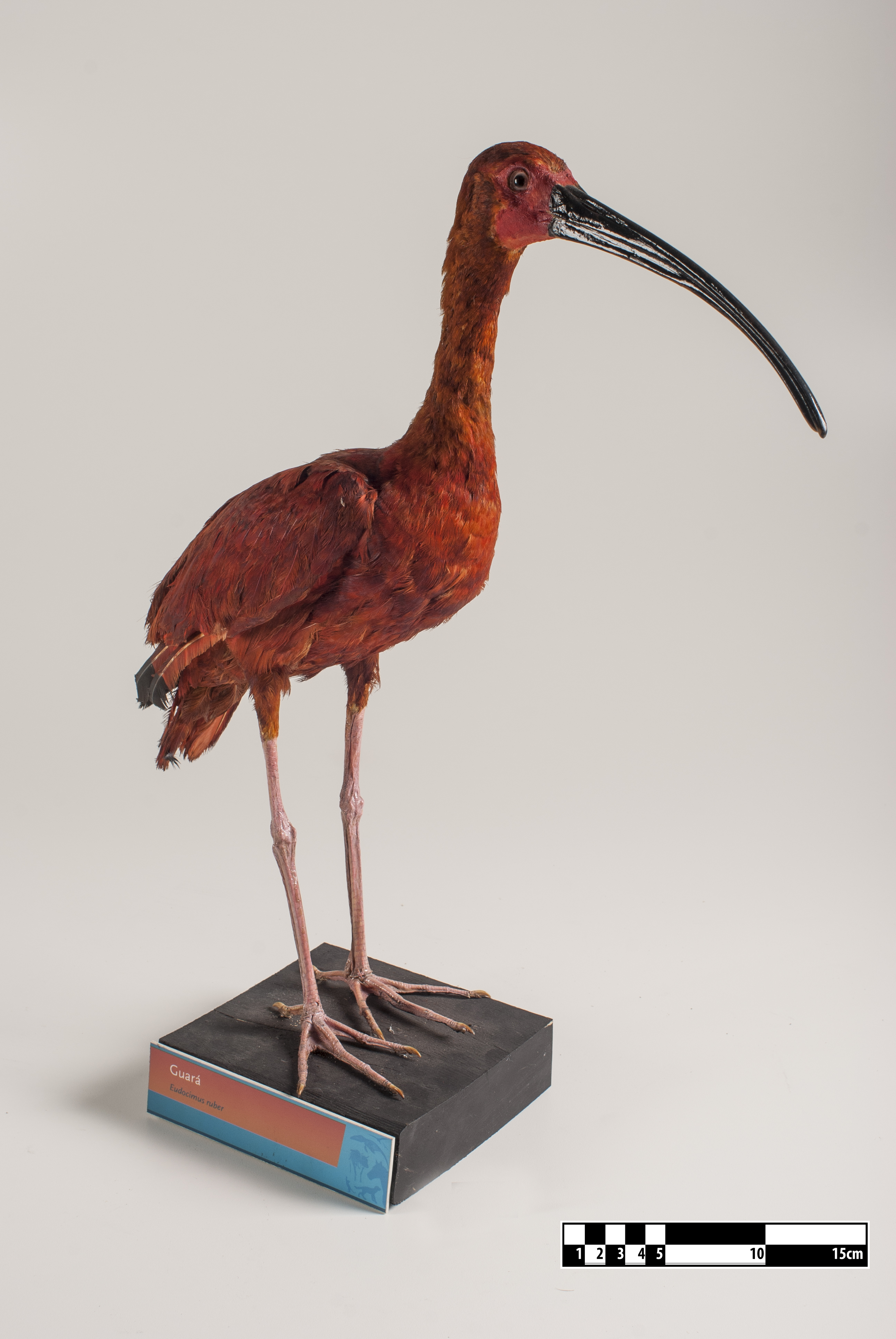
Taxidermy specimen

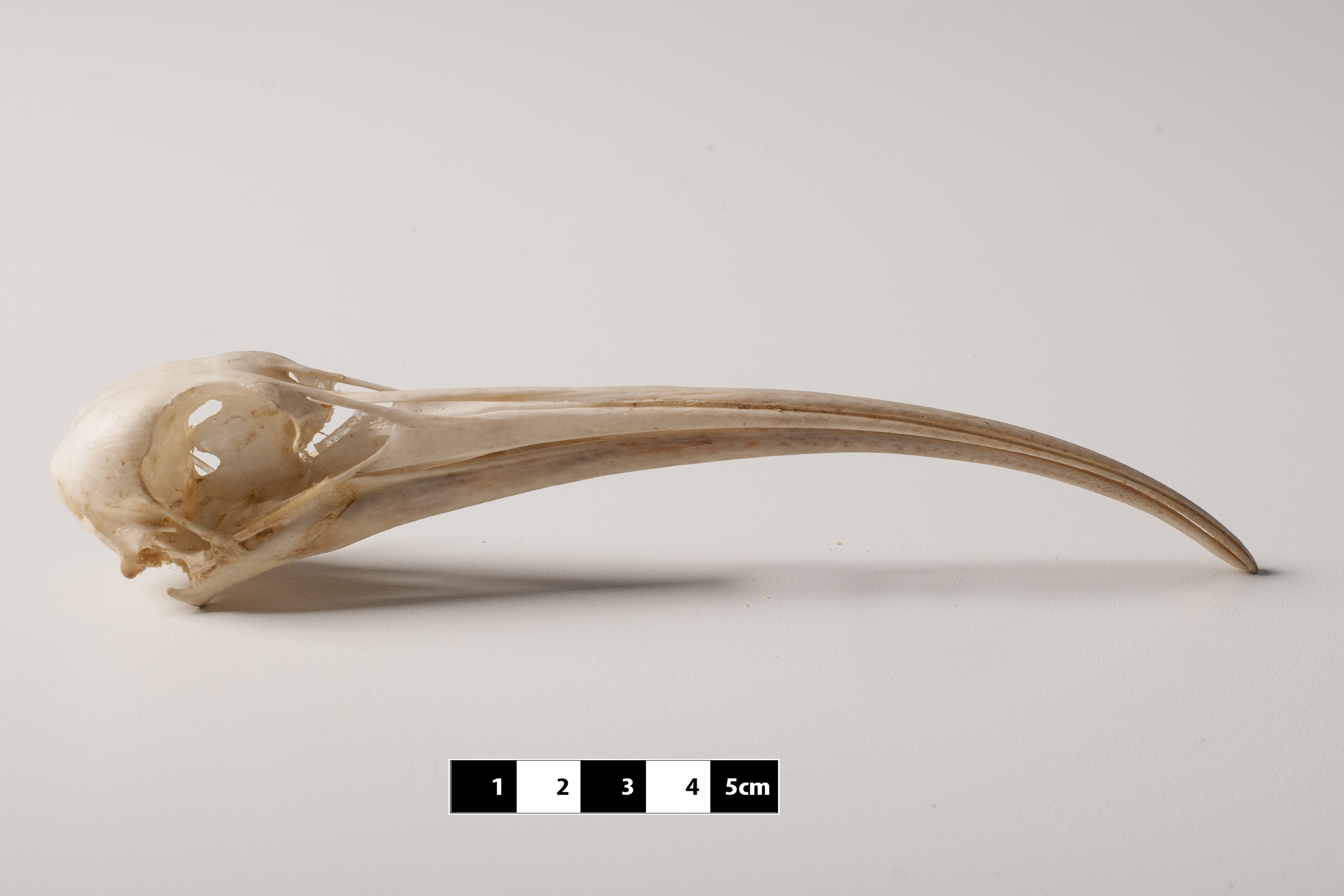
Skull of a scarlet ibis

Adult plumage is virtually all scarlet. The feathers may show various tints and shades, but only the tips of their wings deviate from their namesake color. A small but reliable marking, these wingtips are a rich inky black (or occasionally dark blue) and are found only on the longest primaries – otherwise the birds' coloration is "a vivid orange-red, almost luminous in quality." Scarlet ibises have red bills and feet; however, the bill is sometimes blackish, especially toward the end. They have a long, narrow, decurved bill. Their legs and neck are long and extended in flight.

A juvenile scarlet ibis is a mix of grey, brown, and white. As it grows, a heavy diet of red crustaceans produces the scarlet coloration. The color change begins with the juvenile's second moult, around the time it begins to fly: the change starts on the back and spreads gradually across the body while increasing in intensity over a period of about two years. The scarlet ibis is the only wading bird with red coloration in the world.

Adults are 55–63 centimetres (22–25 in) long, and the males, slightly larger than females, typically weigh about 1.4 kilograms (3.1 lb). Their bills are also on average around 22% longer than those of females. The life span of the scarlet ibis is approximately sixteen years in the wild and twenty years in captivity. An adult scarlet ibis has a wingspan of around 54 centimetres (21 in). Though it spends most of its time on foot or wading through water, the bird is a very strong flyer: they are highly migratory and easily capable of long-distance flight. They move as flocks in a classic V formation.

== Distribution and habitat ==
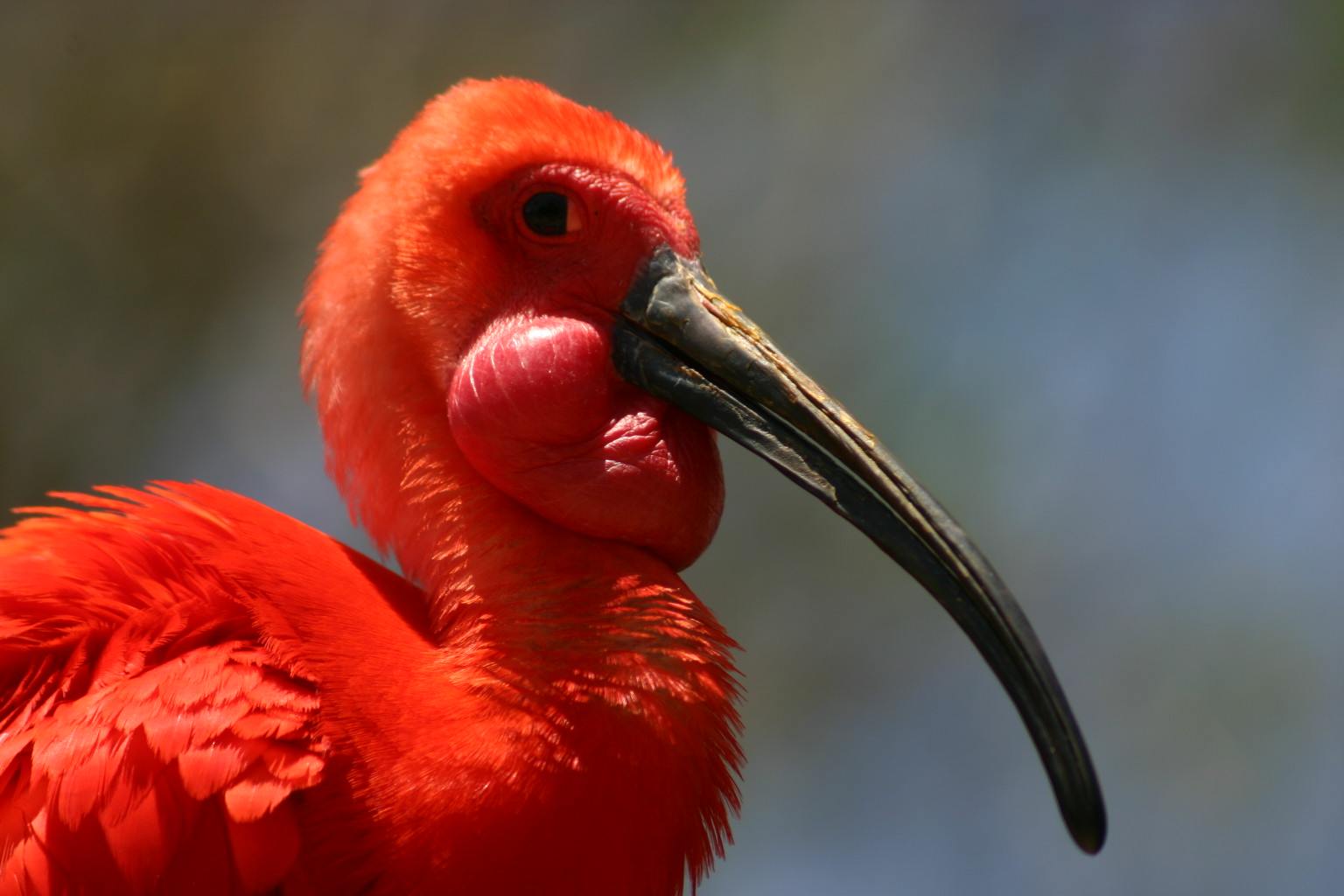
Head of scarlet ibis

The range of the scarlet ibis is very large, and colonies are found throughout vast areas of South America and the Caribbean islands. Native flocks exist in Brazil; Colombia; French Guiana; Guyana; Suriname; and Venezuela, as well as the islands of the Netherlands Antilles, and Trinidad and Tobago. Flocks gather in wetlands and other marshy habitats, including mud flats, shoreline and rainforest. Outlying colonies have been identified in the coastal areas of the states of Espírito Santo, Rio de Janeiro, São Paulo (for example in the Santos-Cubatão mangroves of the Baixada Santista district), Paraná and Santa Catarina. In recent years, bird colonies can be seen as far south as in the coastal areas of Joinville and the island of São Francisco do Sul.

The largest populations are found in the Llanos region of western Venezuela and eastern Colombia. The fertile and remote tropical grassland plains of the Llanos provide a safe haven from human activity. The absence of potential human threats and their fertility have allowed for dense populations of scarlet ibis to form here, alongside its relative the bare-faced ibis. Due to their size and color, they are prominently visible in the region.

Scarlet ibis vagrants have been identified in Belize, Ecuador, and Panama; Aruba, Cuba, Dominica, Grenada, and Jamaica; sightings have even been made in the United States. The species may well have been a natural vagrant to the Gulf Coast in the 19th century or earlier – in The Birds of America, John James Audubon made brief remarks regarding three rubra specimens he encountered in Louisiana. However, virtually all modern occurrences of the species in North America have been introduced or escaped birds. In one notable example from 1962, scarlet ibis eggs were placed in white ibis nests in Florida's Greynolds Park, and the resulting population hybridised easily, producing "pink ibises" that are still occasionally seen.

== Behavior ==
=== Breeding ===
Eudocimus ruber in a nest with baby birds at Busch Gardens Tampa. Video clip

Mating pairs build nests in a simple style, typically "loose platforms of sticks" of a quality described as "artless". They roost in leaf canopies, mostly preferring the convenient shelter of young waterside mangrove trees. Scarlet ibises like wet, muddy areas such as swamps, but for safety they build their nests in trees well above the water. If they can, they nest on islands, where their eggs and chicks are less likely to be in danger from predators.

To attract a female, the male will perform a variety of mating rituals such as "preening, shaking, bill popping, head rubbing, and high flights. As with most birds, mating does not involve any coupling or insertion: instead, a transfer of seminal fluids occurs during external contact between the cloacal openings. After a gestation period of five to six days, the female lays a clutch of three to five smooth, matte eggs which typically incubate for 19–23 days. After a successful courtship, pairs remain faithful and cohabitant, sharing parental responsibilities for the young.

In southeastern Brazil, the ibises gather in colonies in mid-September and build nests at the beginning of November. Egg laying within the colony was synchronous, with female birds laying eggs in three waves in early November, late December and late January.

=== Feeding ===
Their distinctive long, thin bills are used to probe for food in soft mud or under plants. Popularly imagined to be eating only shrimp, a recent study in the Llanos has found that much of their diet consists of insects, of which the majority were scarabs and ground beetles. One species in particular, a scarab beetle Dyscinetus dubius, formed a large part of the diet. Other insect prey include water beetles and water bugs. In contrast, the diet of the co-occurring American white ibis there differed, the latter consuming more bugs, fish and crustaceans.

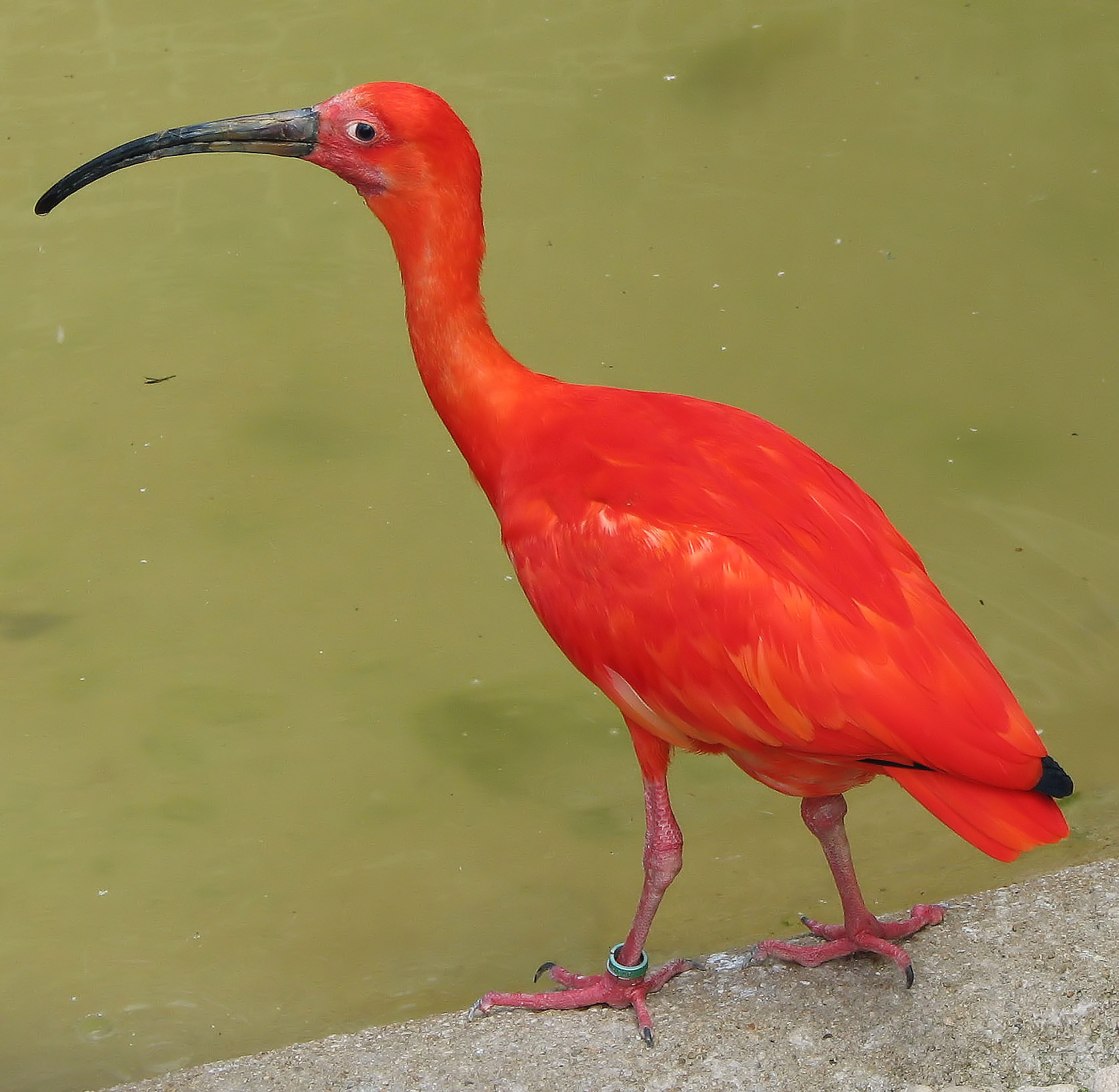
"While showering dignity and color on the scarlet ibis, nature seems to have been reluctant in the bestowal of weapons. The bird's beak was blunt, its toenails were unsharpened, and its eyes had a gentle, soft Bambi quality." – Dr. Paul A. Zahl, Coro-Coro

They do, however, eat much shrimp and other similar fare like ragworms (Nereis), mollusks (such as Melampus), small crabs (Aratus, Uca and Ucides) and other crustaceans, such as crayfish. The large quantity of shrimp and other red shellfish produces a surfeit of astaxanthin, a carotenoid which is the key component of the birds' red pigmentation. Frogs, small snakes, small fish (Cichlidae), fruits and seeds are also occasional prey items for scarlet ibises. When kept in zoos, the birds' diet often contains beetroot and carrot supplement to maintain color vibrancy in their plumage.

The Llanos are notable in that these wetland plains support seven species of ibis in the one region. Here, scarlet ibis are the most aggressive, and attack other species to steal their food. They have also been observed trailing white-faced whistling ducks (Dendrocygna viduata) and domestic livestock, and catching insects disturbed by them.

=== Social behavior ===
The scarlet ibis is a sociable and gregarious bird, and very communally-minded regarding the search for food and the protection of the young. They live in flocks of thirty or more. Members stay close, and mating pairs arrange their nests in proximity to other pairs in the same tree.

For protection, flocks often congregate in large colonies of several thousand individuals. They also regularly participate in mixed flocks, gaining additional safety through numbers: storks, spoonbills, egrets, herons and ducks are all common companions during feedings and flights.

== Status ==
The species has protected status throughout the world, and the International Union for Conservation of Nature has classified the scarlet ibis as a species of Least Concern on the IUCN Red List. Though several local populations appear to be in decline, global totals remain relatively large and the current rate of losses is not considered a threat to the species' survival. Nonetheless, recent losses by established populations in French Guiana have become a concern for conservationists, and in Brazil the bird has been included on a national list of endangered species.

=== Relationship with humans ===
The scarlet ibis and the rufous-vented chachalaca, popularly known as the cocrico, are the national birds of Trinidad and Tobago respectively. Both birds are featured on the coat of arms of Trinidad and Tobago. The cocrico is found on Tobago, Venezuela and Colombia. The scarlet ibis is associated with Trinidad; there are not documented records of the scarlet ibis on Tobago for the last fifteen years.

An important local habitat for the scarlet ibis is the wildlife sanctuary of Caroni Swamp of Trinidad, a 199 hectares (490 acres) wetland reserve first designated in 1953 specifically to provide a habitat for the scarlet ibis.

Using the bird as a literary symbol, American author James Hurst composed a popular short story, "The Scarlet Ibis" (1960). A more recent short story, "Scarlet Ibis" by Margaret Atwood, is included in Bluebeard's Egg (1983). The name also belongs to a book of verse by American poet Susan Hahn.

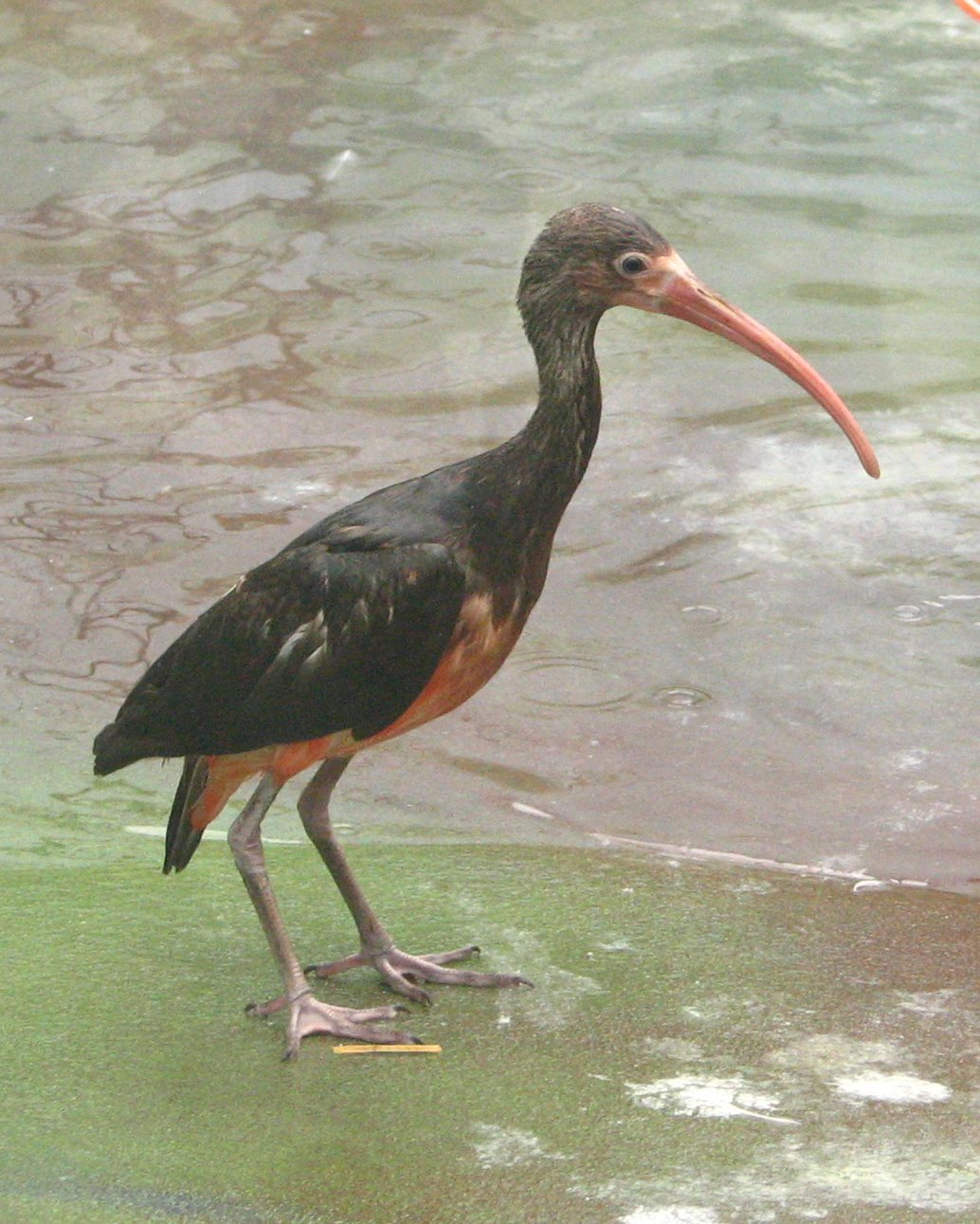
Juvenile

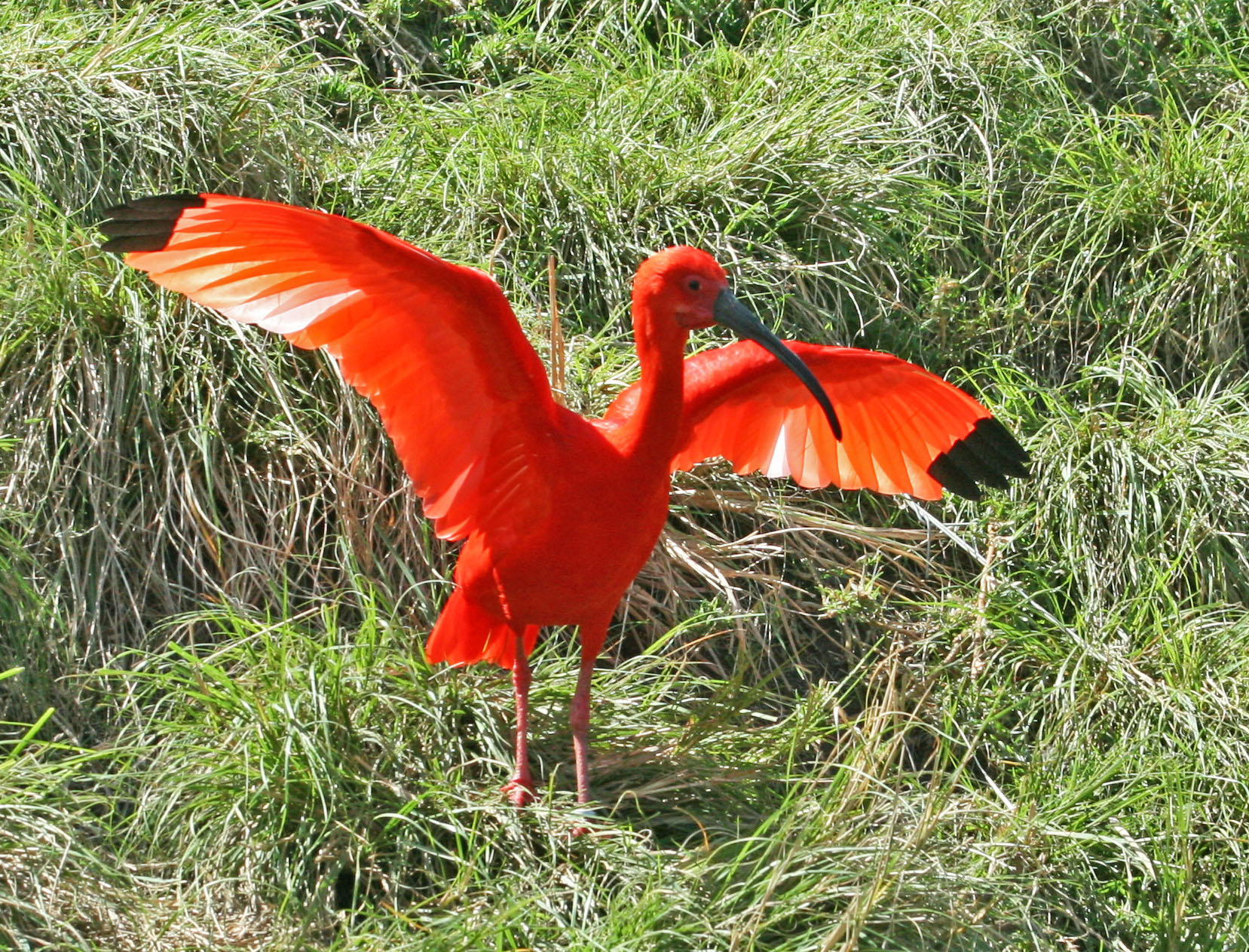
The wing tips are black.

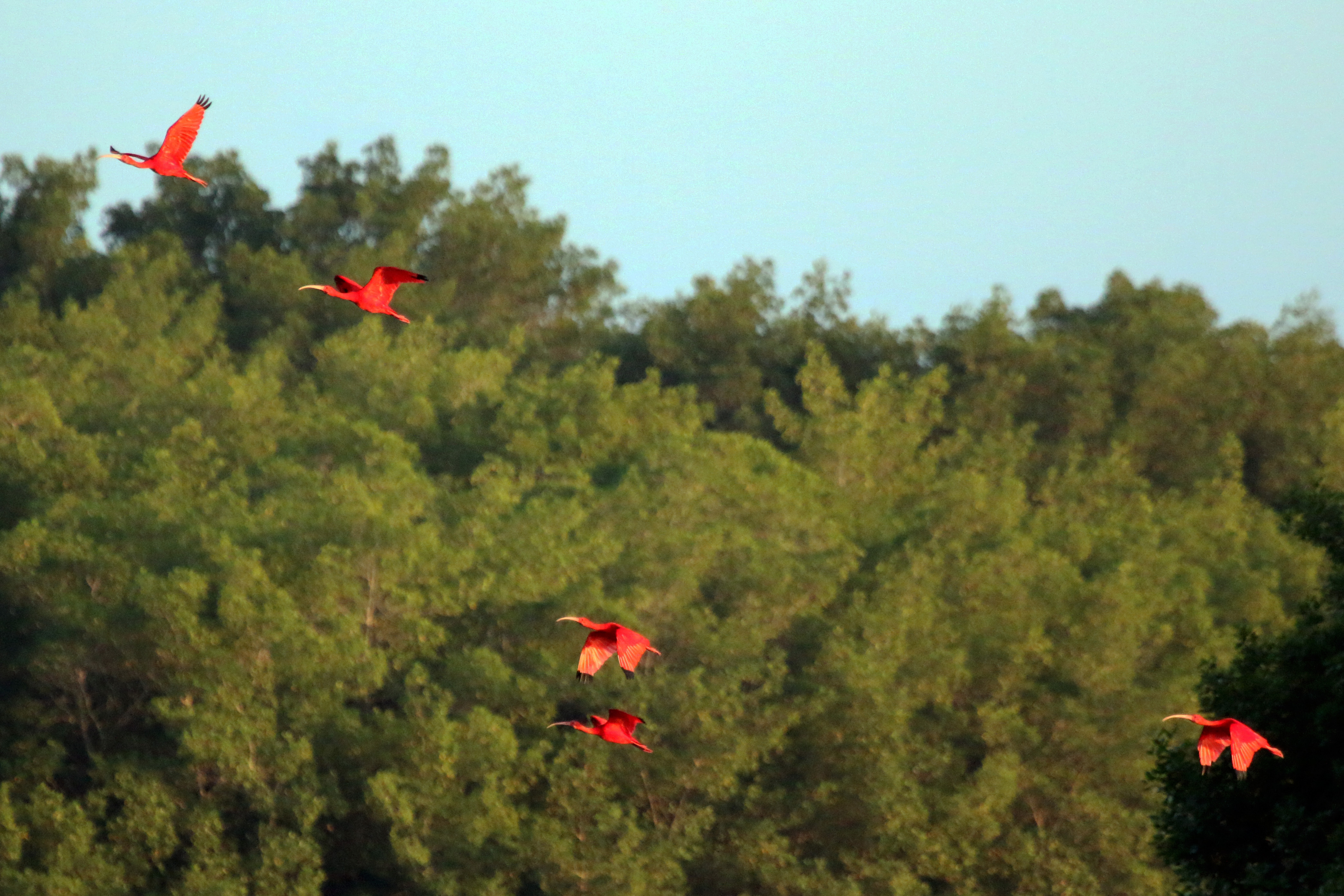
Caroni Swamp, Trinidad

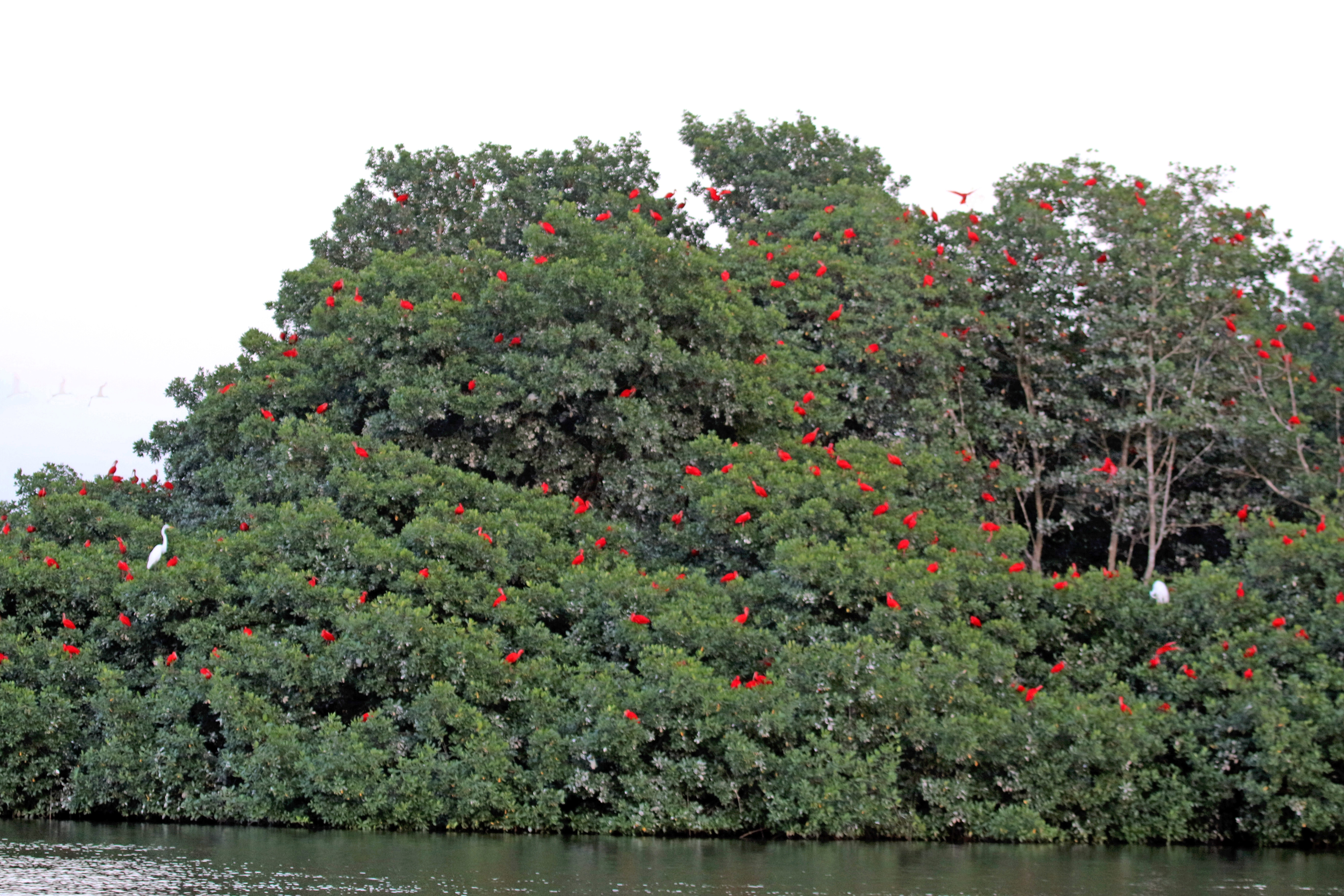
Roosting, Caroni Swamp, Trinidad

Video of a Scarlet ibis
