= Bang You're Dead (disambiguation) =

Bang You're Dead may refer to:

- Bang! You're Dead, a 1954 British psychological drama film
- Berlin, Appointment for the Spies, a 1965 Italian Eurospy film
- "Bang! You're Dead", a 1961 episode of Alfred Hitchcock Presents directed by Alfred Hitchcock
- A 1985 remake of the 1961 episode

== See also ==
- Bang Bang You're Dead (disambiguation)
