= Kiss Kiss Bang Bang (disambiguation) =

Kiss Kiss Bang Bang is a 2005 American crime/comedy film starring Robert Downey, Jr. and Val Kilmer.

Kiss Kiss Bang Bang may also refer to:

== Film ==
- Kiss Kiss (Bang Bang), a 2000 British comedy starring Stellan Skarsgård
- Kiss Kiss...Bang Bang a 1966 Eurospy film with Giuliano Gemma

== Music ==
=== Songs ===
- "Mr. Kiss Kiss, Bang Bang", by John Barry on the 1965 soundtrack Thunderball
- "Kiss Kiss Bang Bang", a 1983 song by Specimen
- "Kiss Kiss Bang Bang", by High Contrast from the 2007 album Tough Guys Don't Dance
- "Kiss Kiss Bang Bang", by Nitzer Ebb from the 2010 album Industrial Complex
- "Kiss^{2} Bang^{2}", by Ayaka Komatsu
- "Miss Kiss Kiss Bang", the German entry to the 2009 Eurovision Song Contest
- "Kiss Kiss Bang Bang", by The Subways (2012)

=== Albums ===
- Kiss Kiss Bang Bang, a 1986 album by The Celibate Rifles
- Kiss Kiss Bang Bang (EP), a 1997 EP by Glassjaw
- Kiss Kiss Bang Bang (Baby K album), 2015

== Books and comics ==
- Kiss Kiss Bang Bang (comics), a comic book published by CrossGen Entertainment
- Kiss Kiss Bang Bang (book), a 1968 collection of film reviews by Pauline Kael

== Television ==
- "Kiss Kiss Bang Bang" (Dawson's Creek)
- "Kiss Kiss Bang Bang" (Pan Am)
- "Kiss Kiss, Bang Bang" (Torchwood)

== See also ==
- Thunderball (soundtrack)
- Bang Bang (disambiguation)
