= John Macdonell (judge) =

British jurist (1846–1921)

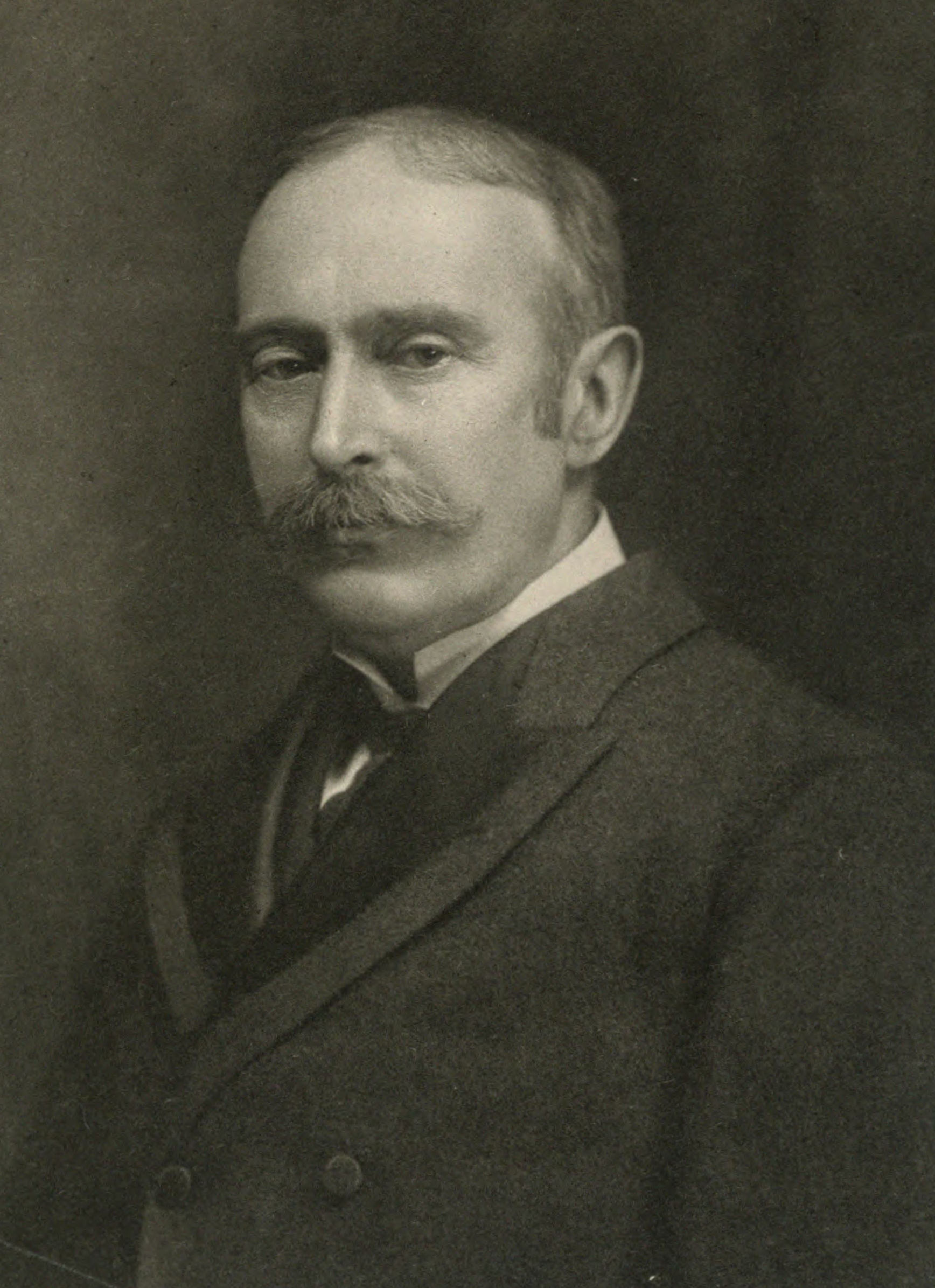
John Macdonell

Sir John Macdonell KCB FBA (1 August 1846 – 17 March 1921) was a British jurist. He was King's Remembrancer (1912–1920) and invested as a Knight Commander of the Order of the Bath. Shaw of Dunfermline gives a prefatory biography in Historical Trials.

John Macdonnell married writer and journalist Agnes Harrison in 1873.

== Selected publications ==
- A Survey of Political Economy. Edinburgh: Edmonston and Douglas. 1871 – via Internet Archive.
- The Land Question; with particular reference to England and Scotland. London: Macmillan. 1873 – via HathiTrust.
- The Law of Master and Servant, 1883
- State Trials (New Series), 1888 (vols. 1–3)
- Macdonell, John; Manson, Edward William Donoghue, eds. (1913). Great Jurists of the World. London: John Murray – via Internet Archive.; 1914 edition, Boston: Little, Brown & Co.
- Law and Eugenics, 1916
- Historical Trials OUP, 1927; republished in 1931, 1933, 1936 as #23 in Thinker's Library

Legal offices
Preceded by James Robert Mellor	King's Remembrancer; 1912–1920	Succeeded by Sir Thomas Chitty, 1st Baronet
