= Chitty Chitty Bang Bang (disambiguation) =

Chitty Chitty Bang Bang is a 1968 British musical adventure fantasy film starring Dick Van Dyke and Sally Ann Howes.

Chitty Chitty Bang Bang may also refer to:

== Arts and entertainment ==
- Chitty-Chitty-Bang-Bang, the original 1964 novel by Ian Fleming
  - Chitty Chitty Bang Bang (car), the vintage racing car which features in the book, musical film and stage production of the same name
  - Chitty Chitty Bang Bang (musical), a 2002 and 2005 stage musical based on the film

=== Music ===
- "Chitty Chitty Bang Bang" (song), a 1968 song from the film
- "Chitty Chitty Bang Bang", a song on the 2010 album H-Logic by Lee Hyori
- "Chitty Chitty Bang Bang", an episode of the American TV series Boston Legal

== See also ==
- Chitty Bang Bang, the informal name of a number of celebrated English racing cars
- Chitty Bang Bang (airship), an airworthy airship constructed for the Chitty Chitty Bang Bang film.
- Chiddy Bang, an American pop-rap group consisting of Chidera "Chiddy" Anamege & Noah "Xaphoon Jones" Beresin
- "Cheatty Cheatty Bang Bang", a 2005 episode of the television show Veronica Mars
- "Chitty Chitty Death Bang", a 1999 episode of the television show Family Guy
- Bang Bang (disambiguation)
- Chitty (disambiguation)
