= Ernest Chitty =

Ernest Chitty (6 December 1883 – 8 June 1948) was a New Zealand Anglican clergyman, tutor and organist. He was born in Dunedin, New Zealand on 6 December 1883. In 1906 he became the first blind University graduate in New Zealand. He was buried at Purewa Cemetery in the Auckland suburb of Meadowbank.
