= Wilf Chitty =

English footballer

Personal information
- Full name: Wilfred Sidney Chitty
- Date of birth: 10 July 1912
- Place of birth: Walton-on-Thames, England
- Date of death: 2 February 1997 (aged 84)
- Place of death: Caterham, England
- Height: 5 ft 10 in (1.78 m)
- Positions: Outside forward; right back

Senior career*
Years	Team	Apps	(Gls)
1928–	Wycombe Wanderers		
–1930	Woking		
1930–1938	Chelsea	45	(16)
1938–1939	Plymouth Argyle	3	(1)
1939–1947	Reading	23	(7)
- * Club domestic league appearances and goals

Wilfred Sidney Chitty (10 July 1912 – 2 February 1997) was an English professional footballer who played in the Football League for Chelsea, Reading and Plymouth Argyle as an outside forward. He later served West Ham United as a youth coach.

== Personal life ==
Chitty was exempt from military service during the Second World War. In 1944, he was injured when a V-1 flying bomb fell near his Caterham home.

== Career statistics ==
Appearances and goals by club, season and competition
Club	Season	League			FA Cup		Total	
Club	Season	Division	Apps	Goals	Apps	Goals	Apps	Goals
Chelsea	1931–32	First Division	6	1	0	0	6	1
Chelsea	1932–33	First Division	6	2	0	0	6	2
Chelsea	1933–34	First Division	5	1	0	0	5	1
Chelsea	1935–36	First Division	1	0	0	0	1	0
Chelsea	1936–37	First Division	8	1	0	0	8	1
Chelsea	1937–38	First Division	19	11	1	0	20	11
Chelsea	Total		45	16	1	0	46	16
Plymouth Argyle	1938–39	Second Division	3	0	0	0	3	0
Career total			48	16	1	0	49	16
