= Elizabeth Chitty =

Canadian artist (born 1953)

- Born: April 6, 1953 (age 73); St. Catharines, Ontario
- Known for: Performance artist, video installation artist and constructed photographs artist.
- Notable work: Demo Model (1978), Telling Tales (1979), Desire Control (1981), Dogmachine (1981) and T.V. Love (1982) are held in the National Gallery of Canada collection in Ottawa, Canada.
- Website: https://elizabethchitty.ca

Elizabeth Chitty (born April 6, 1953) is a Canadian interdisciplinary artist known for performances, video, and installations as well as her writing.

== Biography ==
Elizabeth Chitty was born and raised in St. Catharines, Ontario. Chitty has lived primarily in the Niagara Peninsula, except the period of time early in her career when she lived and worked in Vancouver and Toronto.

== Career ==
In the 1970s and the 1980s, Chitty's single-channel videos were widely exhibited, including in venues such as the Biennale de Paris in 1980 and the 1988 opening at the National Gallery of Canada.

Her passion for reconciliation between First Nations members and settlers entered as a strong theme in her work beginning in the 1990s.

In 2016, Chitty stated the following in reference to her art practice for the 11th 7a11d International Festival of Performance Art in Toronto, "I explore what it means to be in a body, a place, with others. Interrelations of temporal-kinasthetic-visual-aural-textual interests flow through my body of work." Chitty creates further definition in her work through ideas, emotions and sensations.

An early performance of Chitty's, Lap (1976), was performed in artist-run centres in Toronto, Calgary, Vancouver and Montréal. Her performance History, Colour TV & You (1980-81) was performed in fourteen venues in Canada, the U.S., and France. In November 2017, The Grass is Still Green won the 'Exhibit of the Year' at the Ontario Association of Art Galleries annual awards gala. The jury said: "This exhibition expands the gallery into the surrounding lands. The artist is a veteran performance artist, cultural worker and defender of artist’s rights on the Canadian scene who breaks ground and enables the land to speak its local history." Her work Power, a 3 video and 4 audio channel installation influenced by water in the Niagara region, was exhibited at Riverbrink Art Museum in Queenston, Ontario in 2021.

== Collections ==
In 1984 T.V.Love (1982) was purchased by the National Gallery of Canada. Demo Model (1978), Telling Tales (1979), Desire Control (1981) and Dogmachine (1981) video collection were deposited by Art Metropole, Toronto to the National Gallery of Canada in 1997.
