= Lyn Chitty =

British physician and professor

Dame Lyn Susan Chitty DBE FMedSci
- Education: University College London
- Known for: Non-invasive prenatal diagnostics
- Scientific career
- Workplaces: Great Ormond Street Hospital

Dame Lyn Susan Chitty DBE is a British physician and Professor of Genetics and Fetal Medicine at University College London. She is the deputy director of the National Institute for Health and Care Research Great Ormond Street Hospital Biomedical Research Centre. She is the 2022 president of the International Society for Prenatal Diagnosis. Her research considers non-invasive prenatal diagnostics. She was made a Dame in the 2022 New Year Honours.

== Early life and education ==
Chitty earned her medical degree at the University of London.

== Research and career ==
Chitty's interest is in prenatal genetic diagnostics and ultrasound screening of fatal skeletal abnormalities, enabling parents to find out about the health of their unborn children. She was appointed a Chair the Great Ormond Street Hospital in 2009.

Noninvasive prenatal testing (NIPT) for conditions such as Down syndrome was made available through commercial providers in the United States and China in 2011, and in the United Kingdom by 2014. Chitty led the National Institute for Health and Care Research RAPID (Reliable, Accurate Prenatal, non-Invasive Diagnosis) programme, which looked to investigate all aspects of non-invasive testing and evaluate how it could be incorporated into the National Health Service. She showed that implementing noninvasive prenatal testing to the NHS was cost-neutral, and reduced the number of women who needed an invasive test to confirm a high-risk result.

Chitty recruited one third of the rare diseases participants to the 100,000 genome project. She helped members of the public understand genomics and genomic sequencing. At GOSH she worked with young people to understand public health and genomics. She has argued that the lives of cancer patients will be transformed with genomic testing.

In 2020, she was made President of the International Society for Prenatal Diagnosis. She was appointed a Dame Commander of the British Empire in 2022 and elected a Fellow of the Academy of Medical Sciences the following year.

== Select publications ==
- Andrew J Copp; N Scott Adzick; Lyn S Chitty; Jack M Fletcher; Grayson N Holmbeck; Gary M Shaw (30 April 2015). "Spina bifida". Nature Reviews Disease Primers. 1: 15007. doi:10.1038/nrdp.2015.7. ISSN 2056-676X. PMC 4898641. PMID 27189655. Wikidata Q28396364.
- Jenny Lord; Dominic J McMullan; Ruth Y Eberhardt; et al. (23 February 2019). "Prenatal exome sequencing analysis in fetal structural anomalies detected by ultrasonography (PAGE): a cohort study". The Lancet. 393 (10173): 747–757. doi:10.1016/s0140-6736(18)31940-8. ISSN 0140-6736. PMC 6386638. PMID 30712880. Wikidata Q64108553.
- D G Altman; Lyn S Chitty (1 January 1994). "Charts of fetal size: 1. Methodology". British Journal of Obstetrics and Gynaecology. 101 (1): 29–34. doi:10.1111/j.1471-0528.1994.tb13006.x. ISSN 0306-5456. PMID 8297864. Wikidata Q47380972.
