= Bang-bang robot =

A bang-bang robot is a robot in which the motion of its parts is stopped by driving the moveable and extendible parts on each axis, or degree of freedom, against a stopping device. These stopping devices can be simple lugs on an arm, hydraulic or air valves in the control lines, or actuators which stop the movements at their full extent and at their returning position. These types of robot have "little or no trajectory control" over the movement of their parts from the starting points to the stopping points.

Similar types of robot are also called fixed-stop robots.
