= Thomas Hinde (novelist) =

British novelist

- Born: Thomas Willes Chitty; 2 March 1926; Felixstowe, Suffolk, England
- Died: 7 March 2014 (aged 88); West Hoathly, West Sussex, England
- Citizenship: British
- Occupations: Novelist and nonfiction author
- Spouse: Susan Hopkinson (m. 1951)
- Children: 4

Sir Thomas Willes Chitty, 3rd Baronet (2 March 1926 – 7 March 2014), better known by his pen name Thomas Hinde, was a British novelist.

== Life ==
Thomas Chitty was born in Felixstowe, Suffolk, England, the son of Sir Thomas Henry Willes Chitty, 2nd Baronet, a barrister, and his wife Ethel Constance Gladstone, daughter of Samuel Henry Gladstone. He was educated at Winchester College and University College, Oxford. After service in the Royal Navy, he worked briefly for the Inland Revenue and then for the Shell Petroleum Company, before becoming a full-time writer. He became a baronet on the death of his father in 1955.

Chitty married Susan Hopkinson (1929-2021), daughter of the novelist Antonia White, in 1951; the couple remained married until his death in 2014 and had four children. Hinde and his wife, also an author writing under the name Susan Chitty, lived at Bow Cottage, West Hoathly, West Sussex, a village on the edge of Ashdown Forest in the High Weald.

== Pseudonym ==
The surname Hinde belonged to Chitty's family history on his mother's side. Samuel Henry Gladstone (1853–1932) was son of Robert Gladstone, the younger (1811–1872), of Highfield, Cheetham Hill, Manchester, a member of the Liverpool Gladstone family. Robert Gladstone married in 1852 Anne Mary Hinde, daughter of Samuel Hinde of Lancaster; and after her death another Miss Hinde, a cousin of his first wife.

== Works ==
His first novel, Mr Nicholas, was published in 1953. His second, Happy As Larry, the story of a disaffected, unemployable, aspiring writer with a failed marriage, led critics to associate him with the Angry Young Men movement. An excerpt from Happy As Larry appeared in the popular paperback anthology, Protest: The Beat Generation and the Angry Young Men.

Hinde published thirteen further novels before turning to non-fiction. After 1980, he also published books on English stately homes and gardens, English court life, and the forests of Britain, as well as histories of English schools.

== Bibliography ==
=== Novels ===
- Mr. Nicholas (1953) ISBN 978-0333295397; OCLC 6512069
- Happy as Larry (1958) OCLC 943709
- For the Good of the Company (1961) ISBN 978-0706606928
- A Place Like Home (1962) OCLC 560568591
- The Cage (1962) OCLC 2651378
- Ninety Double Martinis (1963) OCLC 2651370
- The Day the Call Came (1964) ISBN 978-1939140586; OCLC 2148232
- Games of Chance: The Interviewer, The Investigator (1965) LCCN 66-29207; OCLC 2725797
- The Village (1966) ISBN 978-0340027806; OCLC 877436315
- High (1968) ISBN 978-0340043028; LCCN 70-401269
- Bird (1970) OCLC 977633443
- Generally a Virgin (1972) ISBN 978-0340156315; LCCN 72-197145; OCLC 549047
- Agent (1974) ISBN 978-0340184554
- Our Father (1975) ISBN 978-0340201565; LCCN 75-43649
- Daymare (1980) ISBN 978-0333304273; OCLC 7109026
- In Time of Plague (2006) ISBN 978-1847828934; OCLC 76797451

=== Nonfiction ===
- Spain A Personal Anthology 1963 (Newnes) OCLC 560568609
- On Next to Nothing: A Guide to Survival Today (1976, with Susan Chitty) ISBN 978-0297770473
- The Great Donkey Walk (1977, with Susan Chitty) ISBN 978-0340224663; OCLC 4230526
- The Cottage Book: A Manual of Maintenance, Repair, and Construction (1979) ISBN 978-0432067703; OCLC 7616427
- Sir Henry and Sons: A Memoir (1980) ISBN 978-0333242179; OCLC 7424466
- A Field Guide to the English Country Parson (1983) ISBN 978-0434982127; OCLC 13580883
- Stately Gardens of Britain (1983) ISBN 978-0393017632; OCLC 10033059
- Forests of Britain (1985) ISBN 0-575-03506-4; LCCN 85-179404
- Just Chicken (1986, with Cordelia Chitty) ISBN 978-0812035698; LCCN 85-4030; OCLC 11813006
- Capability Brown: The Story of a Master Gardener (1987) ISBN 978-0091637408
- Courtiers: 900 Years of English Court Life (1986) ISBN 978-0575042445; LCCN 87-119260
- Tales from the Pump Room: Nine Hundred Years of Bath: The Place, Its People, and Its Gossip (1988) ISBN 978-0575039650; LCCN 88-100683; OCLC 16078706
- Imps of Promise: A History of the King's School, Canterbury (1990) ISBN 978-0907383239
- The Roads and Ways of Britain (1990) ISBN 9781854100818; OCLC 20415364
- Looking Glass Letters (1991; editor) ISBN 1855850389; LCCN 92-106400
- Paths of Progress: A History of Marlborough College (1992) ISBN 978-0907383338
- Highgate School: A History (1993) ISBN 978-0907383376
- Carpenter's children: The Story of the City of London School (1995) ISBN 9780907383482; OCLC 51993106
- A Great Day School in London A History of King's College School (1995) ISBN 978-0907383611
- An Illustrated History of the University of Greenwich (1996) ISBN 978-0907383635
- The Domesday Book: England's Heritage, Then and Now (1996) ISBN 978-1858334400
- The Martlet and the Griffen: An Illustrated History of Abingdon School (1997, With Michael St John Parker) ISBN 978-0907383772 OCLC 39606537

Baronetage of the United Kingdom
Preceded by Henry Willes Chitty	Baronet (of the Temple); 1955–2014	Succeeded by Edward Wiles Chitty
