= Ursula Owen =

English publisher, editor and activist (born 1937)

Ursula Owen Hon. FRSL
- Born: Ursula Margaret Sachs; 21 January 1937 (age 89); Oxford, England
- Education: Putney High School
- Alma mater: St Hugh's College, Oxford University; Bedford College
- Occupations: Publisher; editor; campaigner for free expression

Ursula Margaret Owen Hon. FRSL (born 21 January 1937) is an English publisher, editor and campaigner for free expression.

== Early life ==
She was born Ursula Margaret Sachs in Oxford, England, to Emma Boehm and Werner Sachs, a chemical engineer who became managing director of a multinational company dealing with non-ferrous metals. Her parents were German Jews, and her mother had travelled from Berlin to Oxford to give birth to Ursula, before returning to Germany. Owen spent the first 18 months of her life in Berlin, after which the family was forced to leave Nazi Germany and came to London.

== Education ==
Owen was educated at Putney High School and from there went to St Hugh's College, Oxford University, where she studied medicine and took a BA in Physiology. She then moved into the social sciences, taking a Graduate Diploma at Bedford College in London, and working for some years as a social worker and researcher into mental health issues.

== Career ==
She entered the publishing profession as an editor at Frank Cass & Co. in the early 1970s. She then worked briefly at Barrie & Jenkins. In 1974, Owen became a founder director of Virago Press. As editorial director and later managing director she oversaw the creation of the Virago list. She remained on Virago's board until the company was sold to Little, Brown and Company in 1996.

In 1990, Owen was appointed director of the Paul Hamlyn Fund and cultural policy advisor to the Labour Party. The fund was established to promote and develop Labour's cultural policies under the Shadow Arts Minister Mark Fisher in the run-up to the 1992 general election. In 1993, she became editor and chief executive of Index on Censorship, a magazine for free expression founded by Stephen Spender in 1972. Owen relaunched the magazine, increasing its sales and media profile. She travelled widely for the magazine. Under her editorship from 1993 to 2006, Index became a vital source on all aspects of free expression for media and human rights organisations throughout the world and won several major awards.

Owen was a founder trustee of Free Word, a centre for literature, literacy and free expression in London. Free Word was conceived in 2004, and Owen took it through from an idea to concrete reality, finding the funding from Norwegian foundation Fritt Ord to buy a building for the centre in Farringdon Road. It opened in June 2009. Following the COVID-19 pandemic in April 2021, Fritt Ord confirmed its intention to sell the Farringdon building, which was closed and its resident organisations vacated by May 2021. The Free Word Centre announced its closure on 27 May 2021.

Owen is on the board of the Southbank Centre and English Touring Opera. She has been a governor of Parliament Hill Field School, on the board of the New Statesman and the committee of the Royal Literary Fund. She has lived in Egypt, Lebanon and the United States.

Owen is the editor of the anthology Fathers: Reflections by Daughters (Virago, 1983) and Whose Cities (with Mark Fisher), published by Penguin in 1991.

Owen's memoir Single Journey Only was published in 2019.

She was elected an Honorary Fellow of the Royal Society of Literature in 2020.

== Personal life ==
She was married to historian Roger Owen, whom she had met at Oxford, and they adopted their daughter Kate, although they split up 18 months later. Owen has four granddaughters and is also a great-grandmother.

== Bibliography ==
- Fathers: Reflections by Daughters, Virago Press (1983)
- Whose Cities (edited with Mark Fisher), Penguin Books (1991)
- Single Journey Only, Salt Publishing, 2019
