= Bang Bang You're Dead =

Bang Bang You're Dead may refer to:

- Bang Bang You're Dead (play), a 1999 one-act play by William Mastrosimone
- Bang Bang You're Dead (film), a 2002 film based on the play
- "Bang Bang You're Dead" (song), a 2006 song by Dirty Pretty Things
- Our Man in Marrakesh (also known as Bang! Bang! You're Dead!), a 1966 British comedy spy film
- Bang, Bang, You're Dead!, a 2009 young adult book by Narinder Dhami

== See also ==
- Bang You're Dead (disambiguation)
