= Harriet Spicer =

British businesswoman

Harriet Greville Spicer (born 24 April 1950) is a co-founder of Working Edge, which provides work coaching and mentoring in London, and is a governor of the London School of Economics.

She lived in Chelsea prior to attending Lillsden School for Girls and then Benenden School. In 1968 she spent some time working for Richard Branson's Student magazine. She went on to graduate from St Anne's College, Oxford University.

Spicer was a founder member and executive of Virago Press. She was Chair of the National Lottery Commission and has been chair of the Friendly Almshouses, Brixton. She was a lay member of the Judicial Appointments Commission from 2006 until 2012.
