= Antonia White =

British writer (1899–1980)

by Howard Coster in 1939

Antonia White (born Eirene Adeline Botting; 31 March 1899 – 10 April 1980) was a British writer and translator, known primarily for Frost in May, a semi-autobiographical novel set in a convent school. It was the first book reissued by Virago Press in 1978, as part of their Modern Classics series of books by previously neglected women authors.

== Early life ==
White was born on Perham Road in West Kensington, London to parents Cecil and Christine Botting. She later took her mother's maiden name, White. Her father taught Greek and Latin at St. Paul's School. She was baptized in the Church of England but converted to Roman Catholicism at the age of 9 when her father converted. She struggled with religion and did not feel that she fitted in with the other girls at her school, many of whom were from upper-class Catholic families. She attended the Convent of the Sacred Heart, Roehampton (later Woldingham School, Surrey).

Although she is remembered as a modernist writer, she developed a terrible fear of writing after a misunderstanding when she was 15. She had been working on what was going to be her first novel, which was to be a present for her father. She wanted to surprise him with a book about wicked people whose lives are changed as they discover religion. She attempted to give a detailed description of the evil characters, but, because of her lack of experience, she was unable to describe their wickedness except to say that they "Indulged in nameless vices". The story was found unfinished by officials at her Catholic school and she was then expelled from the school without being given the opportunity to explain her book. She describes this incident as being her most vivid and tragic memory. "My superb gift to my father was absolutely my undoing" she remarked in an interview. She did not begin writing novels again until 20 years later, when her father died.

After she was expelled from the convent at Roehampton, she attended St Paul's Girls' School (the sister school to St Paul's School where her father taught), but did not fit in there either. When she left school she attempted to become an actress, but was unsuccessful. She wrote for magazines and then in advertising, where she earned £250 a year promoting Mercolized wax. She spent nine years working as a copywriter in London. She worked for W.S.Crawfords where she took exception to Florence Sangster who was one of the directors. She wrote a short story, Julian Tye, featuring her as a barely concealed character. White also worked for the BBC as a translator. Antonia White's translations of Colette's Claudine novels were recognised for their elegance and erudition and remain the standard texts today.

== Relationships ==
In 1921, she was married to the first of her three husbands, Reginald Henry Green-Wilkinson. The marriage was annulled only two years later, and reportedly was never consummated. She immediately fell in love again with a man named Robert, who was an officer in the Scots Guards. They never married, and their relationship was brief but intense, which led to her experiencing a severe mental breakdown. She was committed to Bethlem, a public asylum, where she spent the next year of her life.

She described her breakdown as a period of "mania". After she left the hospital, she spent four years participating in Freudian studies. She struggled the rest of her life with mental illness which she referred to as "The Beast".

In 1925 she married a man named Eric Earnshaw Smith, but this marriage ended in divorce. By the age of 30, she had been married three times. During her second marriage, she had fallen in love with two men. One was Rudolph 'Silas' Glossop, described as "a tall handsome young man with a slightly melancholy charm". The other was Tom Hopkinson, then a copywriter. She had trouble deciding whom she should marry following her divorce, and she married Hopkinson in 1930. She had two daughters, Lyndall Hopkinson and Susan Chitty, who have both written autobiographical books about their difficult relationship with their mother.

== Writing career and personal life ==
By 1931, White was married to Tom Hopkinson and was friends with novelist Djuna Barnes, and she was with Barnes when the latter wrote her now famous novel depicting a lesbian affair gone bad, Nightwood. This novel was based on Barnes's relationship with Thelma Wood. In 1933, White completed her first novel, Frost in May, which fictionalised her experiences at Catholic boarding school and her expulsion. She also began writing a second novel, but a failed marriage and mental illness hindered its completion.

Fifteen years later, she completed her second novel The Lost Traveller, which was published in 1950. In the subsequent five years, after undergoing treatment for mental illness and reconverting to Catholicism, she completed the Clara Batchelor trilogy, which includes The Lost Traveller, about her relationship with her mother and father, The Sugar House, about her first unconsummated marriage, and Beyond the Glass, about an intense love-affair followed by a breakdown, which is vividly described. As with her previous work, the trilogy was fictional, but mainly autobiographical. The four novels together narrate her life from ages 9 to 23. In 1966, she published a collection of letters entitled The Hound and the Falcon: The Story of a Reconversion to the Catholic Faith. She wrote Three in a Room, a three-act comedy, as well as many short stories, poems and juvenile fiction.

Her career as a writer seems to have been driven by the desire to cope with a sense of failure, resulting initially from her first attempt at writing, and with mental illness. She is quoted as saying,

The old terrors always return and often, with them, a feeling of such paralyzing lack of self-confidence that I have to take earlier books of mine off their shelf just to prove to myself that I actually wrote them and they were actually printed, bound, and read. I find that numbers of writers experience these same miseries over their work and do not, as is so often supposed, enjoy the process. "Creative joy" is something I haven't felt since I was fourteen and don't expect to feel again.

With regard to the content of her writing, White remarked, "My novels and short stories are mainly about ordinary people who become involved in rather extraordinary situations. I do not mean in sensational adventures but in rather odd and difficult personal relationships largely due to their family background and their incomplete understanding of their own natures. I use both Catholic and non-Catholic characters and am particularly interested in the conflicts that arise between them and in the influences they have on each other." Two of the main themes in White's novels are her relationship with her father and her Catholic faith.

== Legacy ==
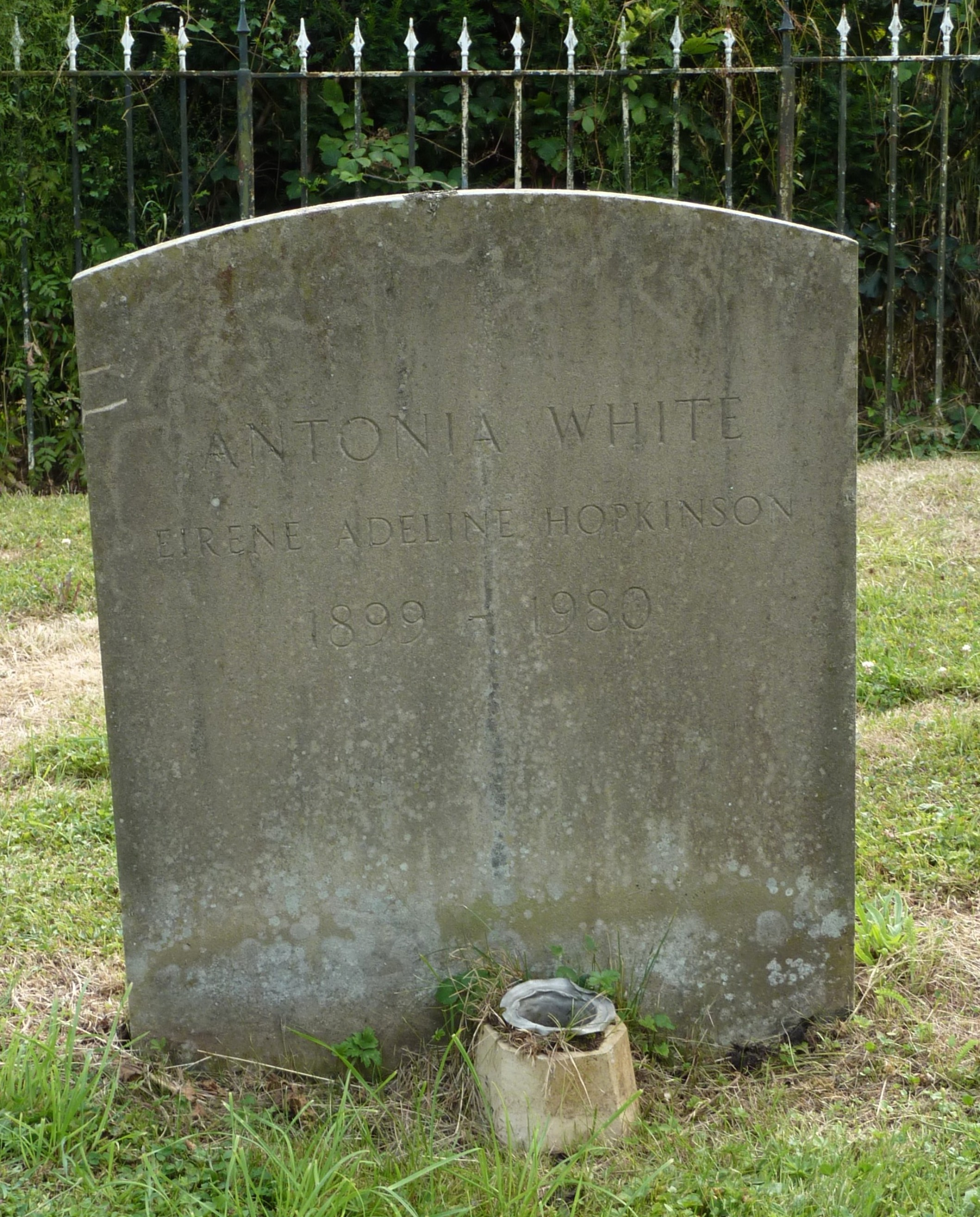
Antonia White's grave at the Shrine of Our Lady of Consolation in West Grinstead, Sussex, photographed in 2014

White died at St Raphael's Care Home in Danehill, East Sussex, near Haywards Heath.

In the introduction to Frost in May, Elizabeth Bowen describes the novel as a school story. She comments that the novel is written for adult readers, but that the language is comprehensible to an intelligent child of twelve. She writes, "We have Nanda’s arrival at Lippington, first impressions, subsequent adaptations, apparent success and, finally, head-on crash." This plot deviates from what Bowen refers to as the normal school story only in that it does not have a happy ending. Frost in May was written during the rise of anti-school school stories after World War I. Regarding White's writing style, Bowen wrote: "Antonia White’s style as a story-teller is as precise, clear and unweighty as Jane Austen's. Without a lapse from this style Antonia White traverses passages of which the only analogy is to be found in James Joyce's Portrait of the Artist as a Young Man." This comparison, which can be considered high praise, also suggests that White's writing is both reminiscent of 19th century realism and indicative of modernist tendencies.

Frost in May was reissued in 1978 by Virago Press as the first book in its Modern Classics series of new editions of out-of-print books by neglected women authors.

In light of the quartet’s recurring focus on theatre, theatrical performance and acting, Frances Babbage has discussed Frost in May through the lens of theatre-fiction: "close attention to the novels reveals [theatre] as a trope figuring powerfully in the narrative, not limited to specific episodes but implicitly shaping the protagonist’s entire journey."

== Works ==
- Frost in May (D. Harmsworth, 1933; Virago, 1978)
- Three in a Room: Comedy in 3 Acts (French's Acting Edition, 1947)
- The Lost Traveller (Eyre and Spottiswoode, 1950; Virago, 1979)
- The Sugar House (Eyre and Spottiswoode, 1952; Virago, 1979)
- Beyond the Glass (Eyre and Spottiswoode, 1954; Virago, 1979)
- Strangers (Harvill Press, 1954; Virago, 1981). Short stories and one short poem, "The Key"
- The Hound and the Falcon: The Story of a Reconversion to Catholic Faith (Longmans, 1965; Virago, 1980)
- As Once in May (1983). Autobiography edited by her daughter, Susan Chitty, as well as unfinished novels Julian Tye and Clara IV.
- Diaries, Volume One, 1926-1957, edited by Susan Chitty (1991)
- Diaries, Volume Two, 1958-1979, edited by Susan Chitty (1992)

=== Children's books ===
- Minka and Curdy (Harvill, 1957)
- Living with Minka and Curdy (Harvill, 1970)

=== Selected translations ===
- Guy de Maupassant: A Woman's Life (1949). Translation awarded the 1950 Denyse Clairouin Memorial Award.
- Henry Bordeaux: A Pathway to Heaven (1952)
- Alexis Carrel: Reflections on Life (1952)
- Marguerite Duras: A Sea of Troubles (1953)
- Serge Groussard: A German Officer (1955)
- Christine Arnothy: I Am Fifteen and I Do Not Want to Die (1955)
- Colette: Claudine at School (1956). Translation of Claudine à l'école (1900)
- Christine Arnothy: Those Who Wait (1957)
- Colette: Claudine in Paris (1958). Translation of Claudine à Paris (1901)
- The Stories of Colette (1958). Translations of Colette's short stories
- Christine Arnothy: It Is Not So Easy to Live (1958)
- Christine Arnothy: The Charlatan (1959)
- Eveline Mahyère: I Will Not Serve (1959)
- Loys Masson: The Tortoises (1959)
- Colette: Claudine Married (1960). Translation of Claudine en ménage (1902)
- Christine Arnothy: The Serpent's Bite (1961)
- Colette: Claudine and Annie (1962). Translation of Claudine s'en va (1903)
- Georges Simenon: The Glass Cage (1973)
