= George Edmund Chitty =

George Edmund Chitty, QC (1909–1974) was Ceylonese lawyer. He led the prosecution against the appeal by the three convicted individuals in the Bandaranaike assassination case.

Born to a legal family, Chitty was educated at Royal College, Colombo where he won the Governor's prize for English. Entering Ceylon Law College, he passed his Advocate's finals and worked as a junior to H. B. Perera, QC. He practiced in the unofficial bar for three years before he was appointed a Crown Counsel. During World War 2, he served as Crown Counsel in charge of Defence Regulations. Reverting to the unofficial bar, he built up a lucrative practice in criminal law in the Assizes and appellate courts, appearing for the defence in many sensational cases of the period such as the Matara Police Station conspiracy case, Turf Club murder case, Seder de Silva murder case, Sedawatte Triple Murder case, The Kularatne Poisoning Case, Pauline de Croos case, Thenuwara case and the Kataragama beauty Queen Murder case. He was retained by the government to lead the prosecution against the appeal was made by all three convicted individuals in the Bandaranaike assassination to the Court of Criminal Appeal, where he led a team of senior crown counsels. He briefly reserved as an Assize Judge before again reverting to the unofficial bar. His juniors included Barnes Ratwatte II, Vernon Wijetunga, QC and George Candappa, PC. He was a member of the Board of Governors of Trinity College, Kandy.

His eldest son Ajit Chitty was a prominent businessman and Chairman of Colombo Shipping and Eastern Brokers. His second son Gritakumar E. Chitty was the founding Registrar of the International Tribunal for the Law of the Sea.His youngest son Chris (Chrisantha) Chitty lives in the United States and was the founder of Soho Inc and Infrastructure Developers International where he is currently the President. He is also President of Happy Wanderer Travel.
