= Sir Thomas Chitty, 1st Baronet =

British judge, barrister and legal scholar

Sir Thomas Willes Chitty Bt
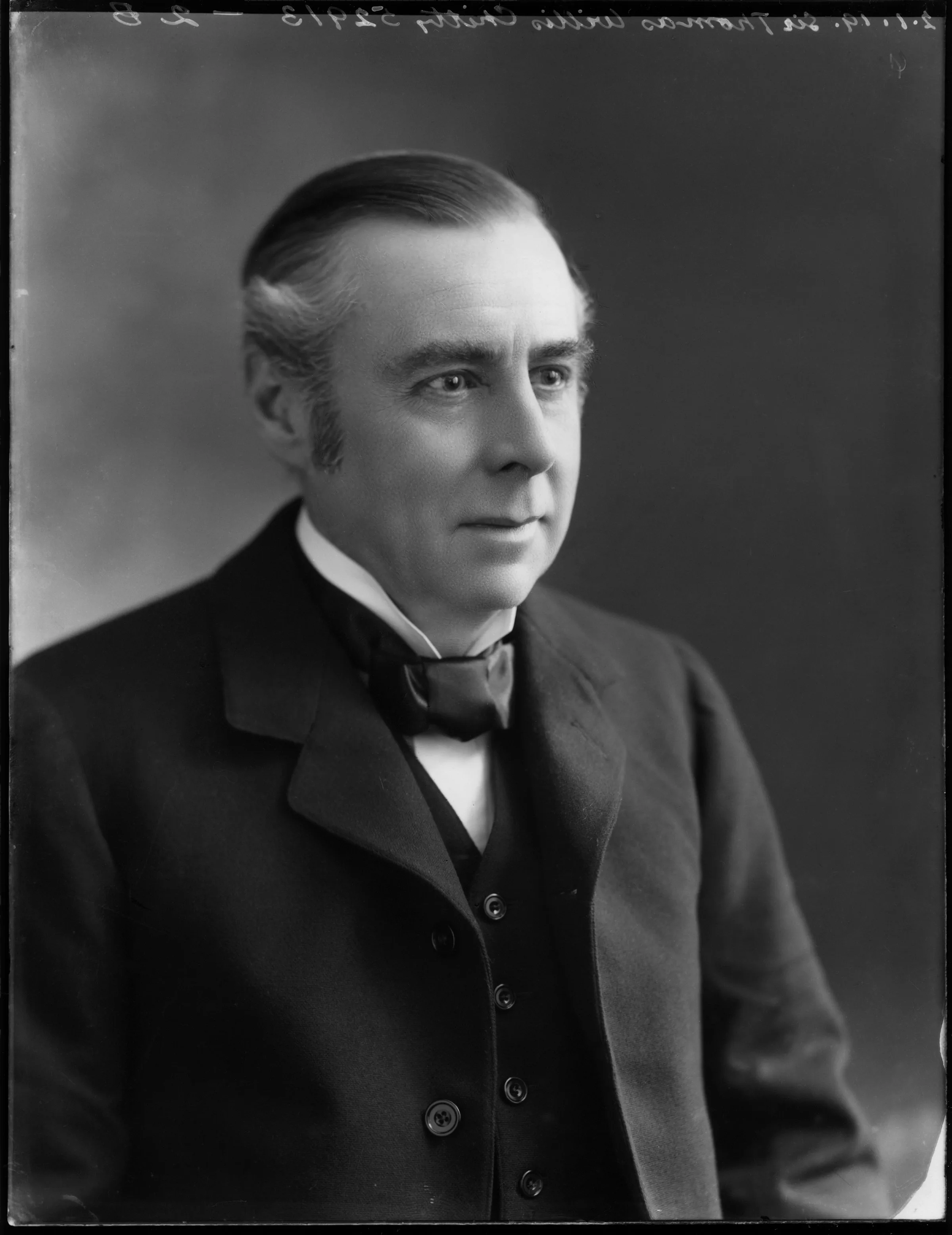
- Chitty in 1919
- Born: 24 June 1855
- Died: 15 February 1930 (aged 74)
- Occupations: Judge; Barrister; Legal scholar

Sir Thomas Willes Chitty, 1st Baronet (24 June 1855 – 15 February 1930) was a British judge, barrister, and legal scholar. From 1901 to 1920, he was a Master of the King's Bench Division, High Court of Justice. From 1920 to 1926, he served as the King's Remembrancer; the oldest judicial position in continual existence. He was knighted in the 1919 New Year Honours and made a baronet in the 1924 New Year Honours.

== Personal life ==
Chitty was a Freemason. He was a member of the Royal Colonial Institute Lodge (3556). He served at various times as Deputy Master of his Masonic Lodge and Grand Registrar (the principal legal officer) of the United Grand Lodge of England.

== Selected works ==
- Chitty, Thomas Willes; Williams, John Herbert; Chitty, Hebert, eds. (1896). A Selection of Leading Cases on Various Branches of the Law (10th ed.). London: Sweet and Maxwell.

Legal offices
Preceded by Sir John Macdonell	King's Remembrancer; 1920–1926	Succeeded by George A. Bonner
Baronetage of the United Kingdom
New creation	Baronet (of the Temple); 1924–1930	Succeeded by Henry Willes Chitty
