= Bluebeard's Egg =

Short story collection by Margaret Atwood

Canadian first edition (1983) published in Toronto by McClelland & Stewart

Bluebeard's Egg is a collection of short stories by Canadian author Margaret Atwood, first published in 1983. The book's first American edition was released in 1986 under the name Bluebeard's Egg and other stories.

== Synopsis ==
In this collection, Atwood explores the politics of sex and heterosexual relationships, examining the emotions, betrayals, and casualties of such relationships. Four of the stories in the collection depart from this theme to instead present presumably autobiographic ruminations on the narrator's childhood influences. The majority of these stories are set in downtown Toronto.

== Contents ==
The two stories omitted in the US 1986 edition were both included in the 1992 version of Dancing Girls

- "Significant Moments in the Life of My Mother"
- "Spring Song of the Frogs"
- "Hurricane Hazel" – This story explores the pain and uncertainty of adolescence; the narrator recalls her first love affair, at age 14, and how the conventions of the time might have trapped her into an unhappy marriage.
- "Scarlet Ibis" – While on vacation in the Caribbean, a family takes a day trip to Caroni Swamp to see the rare scarlet ibis. The story explores the motivations and effects of human engagement with nature.
- "Loulou;" or, "The Domestic Life of the Language" – This story explores the topic of a woman being exploited by men. Loulou is a successful potter who supports financially a number of poets including her ex-husband and former lovers. A fling with her accountant leads her to realize she enjoys being a patroness of the arts, fully aware of her financial exploitation by the poets.
- "The Salt Garden" – The essence of this selection is the story of a married couple who are amiably separated, each with a new lover.
- "Uglypuss" – Joel, a 1960s-style left-wing radical, confronts the contradictions between his public and private life.
- "The Sin Eater" – missing from US 1986 edition.
- "Betty" – missing from US 1986 edition.
- "The Sunrise" – This work explores the experiences of a female painter who progresses from painting erect penises to painting men's faces, stalking men whose faces she wishes to paint. Disillusionment comes when one of these men expresses to her his view that women are properly the objects of violence.
- "Bluebeard's Egg"
- "Unearthing Suite" – Reviewer William French argues that this story can be read as autobiographical. As such, it suggests the beginnings of Atwood's writerly development occurred in her observations of the passing landscape during long car rides with her family.
- "Two Stories about Emma" (which includes "The Whirlpool Rapids" and "Walking on Water")
- "In Search of the Rattlesnake Plantain" – Before the 1986 US release, this story was published in Harper's Magazine (August, 1986).
