= Chitty baronets =

Baronetcy in the Baronetage of the United Kingdom

The Chitty Baronetcy, of The Temple, is a title in the Baronetage of the United Kingdom. It was created on 25 January 1924 for the lawyer and legal writer Sir Thomas Chitty. He was Master of the Supreme Court from 1900 to 1920 and Senior Master of the Supreme Court and King's Remembrancer from 1920 to 1926 as well as managing editor of Halsbury's Laws of England. Chitty was the grandson and namesake of the lawyer and legal writer Thomas Chitty and the nephew of the lawyer Sir Joseph Chitty. The first Baronet's grandson, the third Baronet, who succeeded his father in 1955, was an author (sometimes using the pen name Thomas Hinde). As of 2026 the title is held by the latter's only son, who succeeded in 2014.

== Chitty baronets, of The Temple (1924) ==
- Sir Thomas Willes Chitty, 1st Baronet (1855–1930)
- Sir (Thomas) Henry Willes Chitty, 2nd Baronet (1891–1955)
- Sir Thomas Willes Chitty, 3rd Baronet (1926–2014)
- Sir Andrew Edward Wiles Chitty, 4th Baronet (born 1953)
