= TA First Translation Prize =

- Sponsored by: Daniel Hahn (founding endowment)
- Country: United Kingdom
- Status: Active
- First award: 2017; 9 years ago

The TA First Translation Prize was established by Daniel Hahn in 2017 and is awarded annually to for a debut literary translation, to be shared equally between the first-time translator and their editor.

== About the prize ==
The prize was established by Daniel Hahn in 2017, who donated half of his winnings from the International Dublin Literary Award – for his translation of José Eduardo Agualusa's A General Theory of Oblivion from Portuguese – to help establish a new prize for debut literary translation.

Hahn said: “I was very fortunate to have been named as one of the winners of the International Dublin Literary Award, alongside my friend José Eduardo Agualusa (the first writer I ever translated). Obviously, I'm as broke as the next translator, but the prize pot of the IDLA is so generous that even half of it is a sizeable amount to keep; so, I'm giving the other half to support the first few years of a new prize, which will be run by the Society of Authors."

== Winners and shortlistees ==
=== 2017 ===
Judges: Rosalind Harvey, Bill Swainson, and Daniel Hahn
Winner: Second-hand Time by Svetlana Alexievich, translated from the Russian by Bela Shayevich, edited by Jacques Testard (Fitzcarraldo Editions)
Shortlist:

- Eve Out of Her Ruins by Ananda Devi, translated from the French by Jeffrey Zuckerman, edited by Cécile Menon and Angeline Rothermundt (Les Fugitives)
- Second-hand Time, by Svetlana Alexievich, translated from the Russian by Bela Shayevich, edited by Jacques Testard (Fitzcarraldo Editions)
- Swallowing Mercury by Wioletta Greg, translated from the Polish by Eliza Marciniak, edited by Max Porter and Ka Bradley (Portobello Books).
- The Sad Part Was, by Prabda Yoon, translated from the Thai by Mui Poopoksakul, edited by Deborah Smith (translator) (Tilted Axis Press)
- The Queue, by Basma Abdel Aziz, translated from the Arabic by Elisabeth Jaquette, edited by Sal Robinson, Taylor Sperry and Željka Marošević (Melville House)
- Notes on a Thesis by Tiphaine Rivière, translated from the French by Francesca Barrie, edited by Clare Bullock (Jonathan Cape)

=== 2018 ===
Judges: Philip Gwyn Jones, Daniel Hahn, and Margaret Jull Costa
Winner: The Impossible Fairytale by Han Yujoo, translated by Janet Hong, edited by Ethan Nosowsky (Titled Axis Press)
Shortlist:

- Gini Alhadeff for her translation of I Am the Brother of XX edited by Barbara Epler and originally written by Fleur Jaeggy in Italian (And Other Stories)
- Fionn Petch for his translation of Fireflies edited by Annie McDermott and originally written by Luis Sagasti in Spanish (Charco Press)
- Alex Valente for his translation of Can You Hear Me? edited by Federico Andornino and originally written by Elena Varvello in Italian (Two Roads Books)

=== 2019 ===
Judges: Daniel Hahn, Ellie Steel, and Shaun Whiteside.

Winner: Morgan Giles and Saba Ahmed (editor) for a translation of Tokyo Ueno Station by Yu Miri (Tilted Axis Press). Translated from Japanese.

Runner-up: Charlotte Whittle and Bella Bosworth (editor) for a translation of People in the Room by Norah Langé (And Other Stories). Translated from Spanish.

Shortlist:

- Sarah Booker and Lauren Rosemary Hook (editor) for a translation of The Iliac Crest by Cristina Rivera Garza (And Other Stories) Translated from Spanish.
- Natascha Bruce and Jeremy Tiang (editor) for a translation of Lonely Face by Yeng Pway Ngon (Balestier Press). Translated from Chinese.
- Ellen Jones, Fionn Petch (editor) and Carolina Orloff (editor) for a translation of Trout, Belly Up by Rodrigo Fuentes (Charco Press). Translated from Spanish.
- William Spence and Tomasz Hoskins (editor) for a translation of The Promise: Love and Loss in Modern China by XinRan Xue (I.B. Tauris). Translated from Mandarin.

=== 2020 ===
Judges: Daniel Hahn, Maureen Freely and Max Porter.

Winner: Nicholas Glastonbury and Saba Ahmed (editor) for a translation of Every Fire You Tend by Sema Kaygusuz (Tilted Axis Press). Translated from Turkish.

Runner-up: Nicholas Royle and Tim Shearer (editor) for a translation of Pharricide by Vincent de Swarte (Confingo Publishing). Translated from French.

Shortlist:

- Laura Francis and editor Ka Bradley for a translation of The Collection by Nina Leger (Granta Books). Translated from French.
- Annie McDermott and editor Lizzie Davis for a translation of Empty Words by Mario Levrero (And Other Stories). Translated from Spanish.
- Ruth Diver and editor Elise Williams for a translation of The Little Girl on the Ice Floe by Adélaïde Bon (MacLehose Press). Translated from French.
- Owen Good and editor Bishan Samaddar for a translation of Pixel by Krisztina Tóth (Seagull Books). Translated from Hungarian.

=== 2021 ===
Judges: Daniel Hahn, Vineet Lal, and Annie McDermott.

Winner:Jackie Smith and editor Bill Swainson for a translation of An Inventory of Losses by Judith Schalansky (MacLehose Press). Translated from German.

Runner-up:Padma Viswanathan and editor Edwin Frank for a translation of São Bernardo by Graciliano Ramos (New York Review Books). Translated from Portuguese.

Shortlist:

- Jennifer Russell and editor Denise Rose Hansen for a translation of Marble by Amalie Smith (Lolli Editions). Translated from Danish.
- Lucy Rand and editor Sophie Orme for a translation of The Phone Box at the Edge of the World, by Laura Imai Messina (Bonnier Books UK Ltd). Translated from Italian.
- Rahul Bery and editor Federico Andornino for a translation of Rolling Fields by David Trueba (Weidenfeld & Nicolson – Orion Publishing Group). Translated from Spanish.
- Simon Leser and editor Andrew Hsiao for a translation of Tomorrow They Won't Dare to Murder Us by Joseph Andras (Verso Books). Translated from French.

=== 2022 ===
Judges: Saba Ahmed, Ka Bradley, and Daniel Hahn

Winner: Marta Dziurosz and editors Zeljka Marosevic and Sophie Missing for a translation of Things I Didn't Throw Out by Marcin Wicha (Daunt Books Publishing) Translated from Polish.

Runner-up: Jo Heinrich and editor Gesche Ipsen for a translation of Marzahn, Mon Amour by Katja Oskamp (Peirene Press) Translated from German.

Shortlist:

- Bethlehem Attfield and editor David Henningham for a translation of The Lost Spell by Yismake Worku (Henningham Family Press) Translated from Amharic.
- Elena Pala and editor Federico Andornino for a translation of The Hummingbird by Sandro Veronesi (Weidenfeld and Nicolson, Orion) Translated from Italian.
- Kat Storace and editor Jen Calleja for a translation of what will it take for me to leave by Loranne Vella (Praspar Press) Translated from Maltese.
- Abigail Wender and editor Katy Derbyshire for a translation of The Bureau of Past Management by Iris Hanika (V&Q Books) Translated from German.
