= Bill Swainson =

English editor and literary consultant

Bill Swainson OBE, Hon. FRSL
- Born: William John Galliene Swainson; Lancaster, Lancashire, England
- Education: University of Leeds
- Occupations: Editor, publisher, literary consultant
- Spouse: Caroline McCormick
- Awards: TA First Translation Prize

Bill Swainson OBE, Hon. FRSL is an English editor and literary consultant, who has several decades of experience working in independent and mainstream publishing, including with John Calder Ltd, Allison & Busby, Fourth Estate, the Harvill Press and Bloomsbury Publishing until 2015. Since then, he has been consultant editor at MacLehose Press, and non-fiction editor-at-large for Oneworld Publications, He serves as a trustee of the Lancaster Literature Festival and the Cultural Philanthropy Foundation.

== Biography ==
Born in Lancaster, Lancashire, Swainson studied at the University of Leeds, where he read English, before beginning a career in publishing. From 1976 to 1988, he was employed by John Calder Ltd, going on to work with Allison & Busby (1980–87), Fourth Estate (1987–88) and the Harvill Press (1989–1995), followed by a period as a freelancer, before joining Bloomsbury Publishing in 2000 as senior commissioning editor, until 2015. He has subsequently been consultant editor at MacLehose Press, focused on fiction in translation, and non-fiction editor-at-large for Oneworld Publications. He has been described as "an enthusiast for literature in translation", and has been a judge for prizes including the Saif Ghobash–Banipal Prize for Arabic Literary Translation and the Translators Association First Translation Prize.

Among many notable authors with whom Swainson has worked in an editorial capacity are Mourid Barghouti, Javier Cercas, Paul Durcan, Al Gore, A. C. Grayling, Dermot Healy, Elizabeth Kolbert, David Kynaston,Amin Maalouf, Laurie Penny, Agnès Poirier, Jacqueline Rose, Judith Schalansky, W. G. Sebald, Will Self, Matthew Sweeney, Juan Gabriel Vásquez and Delphine de Vigan.

In 2000, Swainson was editor of The Encarta Book of Quotations (Bloomsbury Publishing Plc). In 2019, he was co-editor (with Barbara Schwepcke) of A New Divan: A Lyrical Dialogue Between East and West (Gingko Library), a multilingual anthology in honour of the 200th anniversary of Johann Wolfgang von Goethe's poem sequence West-Eastern Divan. Among contributors to A New Divan are Adonis, Mourid Barghouti, Jan Wagner, Don Paterson, Jo Shapcott, George Szirtes, Lavinia Greenlaw and Robin Robertson.

Swainson has served in roles as adviser and board member of literary organizations including the British Centre for Literary Translation, The Poetry Society, the Poetry Book Society, the Poetry Translation Centre, and is a trustee of the Cultural Philanthropy Foundation and the Lancaster Literature Festival (LitFest). He convenes the LitFest International Book Club.

== Awards and recognition ==
In the 2015 Birthday Honours, Swainson was appointed Officer of the Order of the British Empire (OBE) for services to Literary Translation.

In 2022, the TA First Translation Prize for debut translation from any language, shared between the translator and their editor, was awarded to Jackie Smith together with Swainson as editor, for a translation of An Inventory of Losses by Judith Schalansky, published by MacLehose Press.

Swainson was elected an Honorary Fellow of the Royal Society of Literature (HFRSL) in 2023.

In July 2026, he received an honorary degree (D Litt 'Honoris Causa') from Lancaster University.

== Personal life ==
Swainson is married to Caroline McCormick, director and founder of cultural sector consultancy company, Achates.
