= Ġorġ Mallia =

Maltese communications academic and cartoonist (1957–2026)

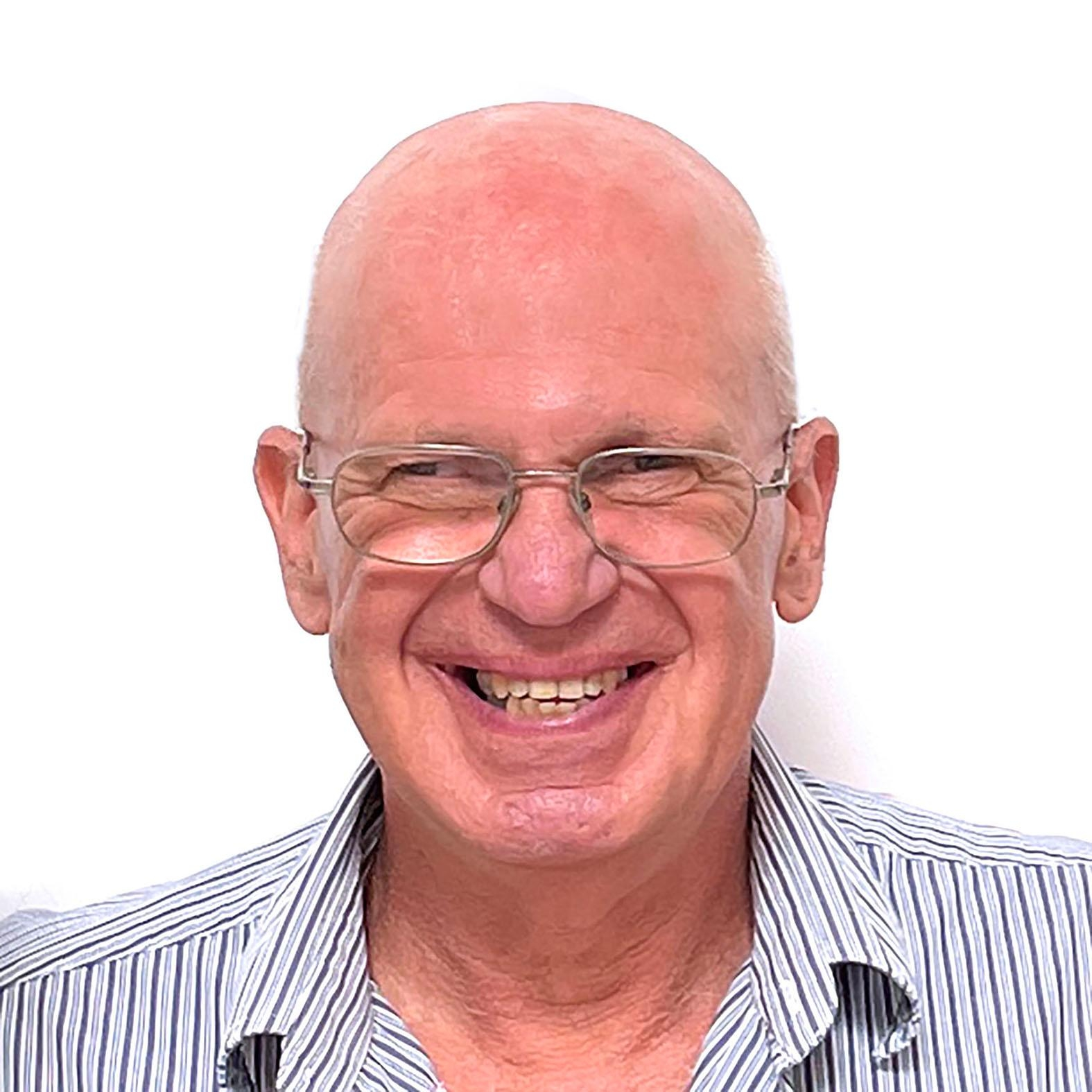
- Mallia in 2021
- Born: 9 November 1957; Qormi, Crown Colony of Malta
- Died: 19 August 2026 (aged 68)
- Known for: Communications, Instructional Technology, Cartoons, Illustration, Children's Books
- Website: www.gorgmallia.com

Ġorġ Mallia (9 November 1957 – 19 August 2026) was a Maltese communications academic, author and cartoonist.

== Life and work ==
Mallia was born in Qormi, Malta on 9 November 1957. He had a B.A.(Hons) in English Literature and an M.A. in communications, both from the University of Malta, and a Ph.D. in Instructional Technology, from the University of Sheffield, UK. He specialised in Print and Presentation Media, Personal Communications, Instructional Design and Technology (particularly Transfer of Learning), New Media impacts, and Visual Narrative. Ġorġ Mallia was a professor of communications, and the Head of the Department of Media and Communications, in the Faculty of Media and Knowledge Sciences at the University of Malta.

He lived in Attard, Naxxar, Msida, all in Malta and in Malmö, Sweden. Mallia was married three times. Both marriages ended in divorce. He had two children from his first marriage. Mallia died on 19 August 2026, at the age of 68.

== Publications, media work and cartoons ==
As an author, Ġorġ Mallia produced mostly children's books, which he also illustrated. His Pullu series for very young children is very popular in Malta and has introduced countless children to reading in Maltese. He also wrote two collections of experimental short stories for adults, a book of microstories (Mitt Ruħ) and a collection of poems. He was editor of the comics series Avventura (Adventure), 1982 and Il-Komik (The Comic), 1983–1984. His books for children also include Ktieb ix-Xwejjaħ (1978 / 2023), Avventura taħt l-Art (1993), Il-Professur Għasfur (2015), and Sigurd and the Tree of Life (2016). A collection of his magical realism stories was published as Il-Fantastiku in 2023. He was co-editor and producer of the children's magazine Sagħtar, and past editor of the short lived national children's magazine HeyU!

Mallia is one of Malta's best known cartoonists. His cartoons have been published in newspapers and magazines throughout the island. From 1993 to 2008 he produced what was then Malta's only regular socio-political comic strip (One Family) in The Sunday Times of Malta. Since 2020 he produced a comic strip that initially mapped humorously the COVID-19 pandemic in Malta, but then also took on socio-political satire, Żepp. Initially run twice weekly in The Times of Malta, it then appeared once a week in The Sunday Times of Malta. He was also well known as a pioneering book illustrator in Malta.

He published extensively (in Maltese and English) in his academic fields of interest, also producing an edited volume of papers exploring the use of social media in education, The Social Classroom (2014).

In the 2022 edition of the Maltese National Book Prize for books published in 2021, he won in the short story category for his editing of Il-Ħamsin.

Mallia also produced and presented a number of programmes on Maltese national television and radio. On Maltese national television, he presented and produced the children's programme "Il-Kastell Imsaħħar" in 1991. From 1978 to 2011 he presented and produced five radio series on different stations. In 1996 he won the Broadcasting Authority Award for excellence in broadcasting for his radio analysis of Maltese humour in the series done for Radju ta' l-Università, "Biex Nidhku" ("What we laugh at").

He was chairman of the National Book Council of Malta between 2005 and 2013. He was one of the organisers of the annual international conference held in Greece on Information Communications Technologies in Education.

== Bibliography ==
This is a full list of Ġorġ Mallia's non-academic publications.

Children's books

- Ktieb ix-Xwejjaħ (1987)
- Avventura taħt l-Art (1993)
- Pullu taħt is-Sodda (2000)
- Pullu u d-Dragun (2001)
- L-Avventura ta’ Pullu (2002)
- Pullu u t-tifla mill-ispazju (2003)
- Il-Kukkudrill Eroj (2004)
- Il-Ħolma ta' Pullu (2005)
- Pullu u d-Dinja Nadifa (2009)
- Avventura madwar l-Ewropa (with Loranne Vella) (2012)
- Il-Professur Għasfur (2015)
- Sigurd and the Tree of Life (2016)
- Melanie and Karl’s Enchanted Adventure (2020)
- L-Avventura Msaħħra ta’ Melanie u Karl (2020)
- Il-Professur Għasfur fl-Ispazju (2021)
- Ktieb ix-Xwejjaħ (2023) - Revised Edition
- Il-Fantastiku (2023)
- L-Istejjer tal-Professur Għasfur (2024)

Short stories

- Mill-Art ta' Qatt u Qatt (1977)
- Żagħżugħ bla Isem (1985)
- Mitt Ruħ (2020)

Poetry

- My Love Had Eyes of Blue and Dreams (2019)

Graphic Narrative Collections

- Adron, Re (1982)
- Żepp: His Pandemic Years (2022)

Translations

- Peter Pan (from the English original by J.M. Barrie) (1982)
- Milied Imħawwad (with M.L. Kold, from the Swedish original by Ingelin Angerborn and Per Gustavsson) (2019)

Edited collections

- Dwal (1977)
- Taħt Sema Kwiekeb (with Trevor Żahra) (1996)
- Tużżana (with Trevor Żahra) (1997)
- Il-Ħamsin (2021)

Critical Analysis

- A Childhood of Delight (with Charles Briffa) (1992)
- Il-Kotba tat-Tfal f'Malta (with Charles Briffa and Trevor Żahra) (2002)
- The Metal Art of Marie Louise Kold (2017)
