= Gingko Library =

UK charitable organization

Gingko is a UK-based charitable foundation created in 2014 to promote dialogue and understanding with the Middle East, West Asia and North Africa through conferences, publications, events and cultural programmes. It should not be confused with Gingko Press, which is a publisher originally based in Germany.

Gingko was established in memory of Werner Mark Linz, the late publisher of the American University in Cairo Press. Dr Barbara Schwepcke, Chief Executive and founder of Gingko, explained that Linz "always thought big. So it is not surprising that his last plan was a 10-year project of dialogues to preserve and promote the genius of Arab Civilization". The inaugural Gingko conference was held at SOAS University of London in December 2014. There have since been conferences at the British Academy in London, in Berlin at the Barenboim–Said Academy, and in 2017 at the London School of Economics. It also has a long-standing postgraduate fellowship programme with Al-Azhar University in Cairo.

Gingko's publications include Eric Ormsby's parallel text translation of Goethe's West-Eastern Divan. This inspired A New Divan (edited by Bill Swainson and Barbara Schwepcke), a multilingual anthology of 24 original poems and their poetic English interpretations inspired by Goethe's original. In 2019, 200 years after the first publication of the West-Eastern Divan, Gingko organised a celebration of this inter-cultural project by touring the contributors of A New Divan, taking in the Hay Festival, Bradford Literature Festival and Edinburgh International Festival, culminating in the New Divan Festival at the Barenboim-Said Academy.

In 2021, its programme of cultural events included "Christmas and the Qur'an", a dialogue co-hosted with The Dean and Chapter of Westminster Cathedral, introduced by Professor Karl-Josef Kuschel, in conversation with Imam Dr Muhammed Gamal Abdelnour.

Other significant publications have included Art, Trade and Culture, The Culinary Crescent, The Architectural Heritage of Yemen and two books with the award-winning Egyptian/Lebanese street artist and graphic designer Bahia Shehab: At the Corner of a Dream. A Journey of Resistance and Revolution: The Street Art of Bahia Shehab (2020) and You Can Crush the Flowers, A Visual Memoir of the Egyptian Revolution (2021).
