= Île Saint-Paul =

Island in the southern Indian Ocean

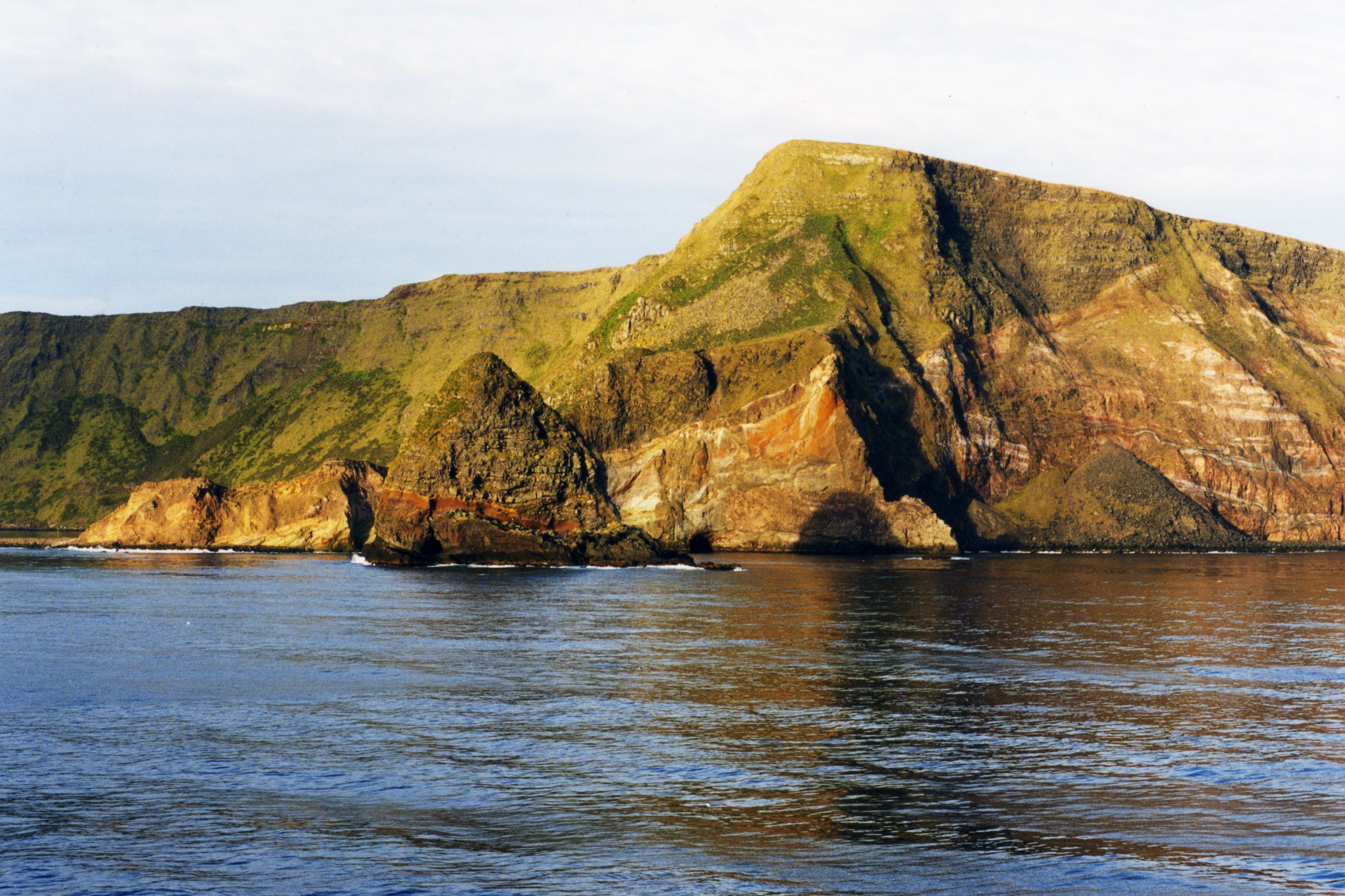
- Saint-Paul with Quille Rock in the foreground

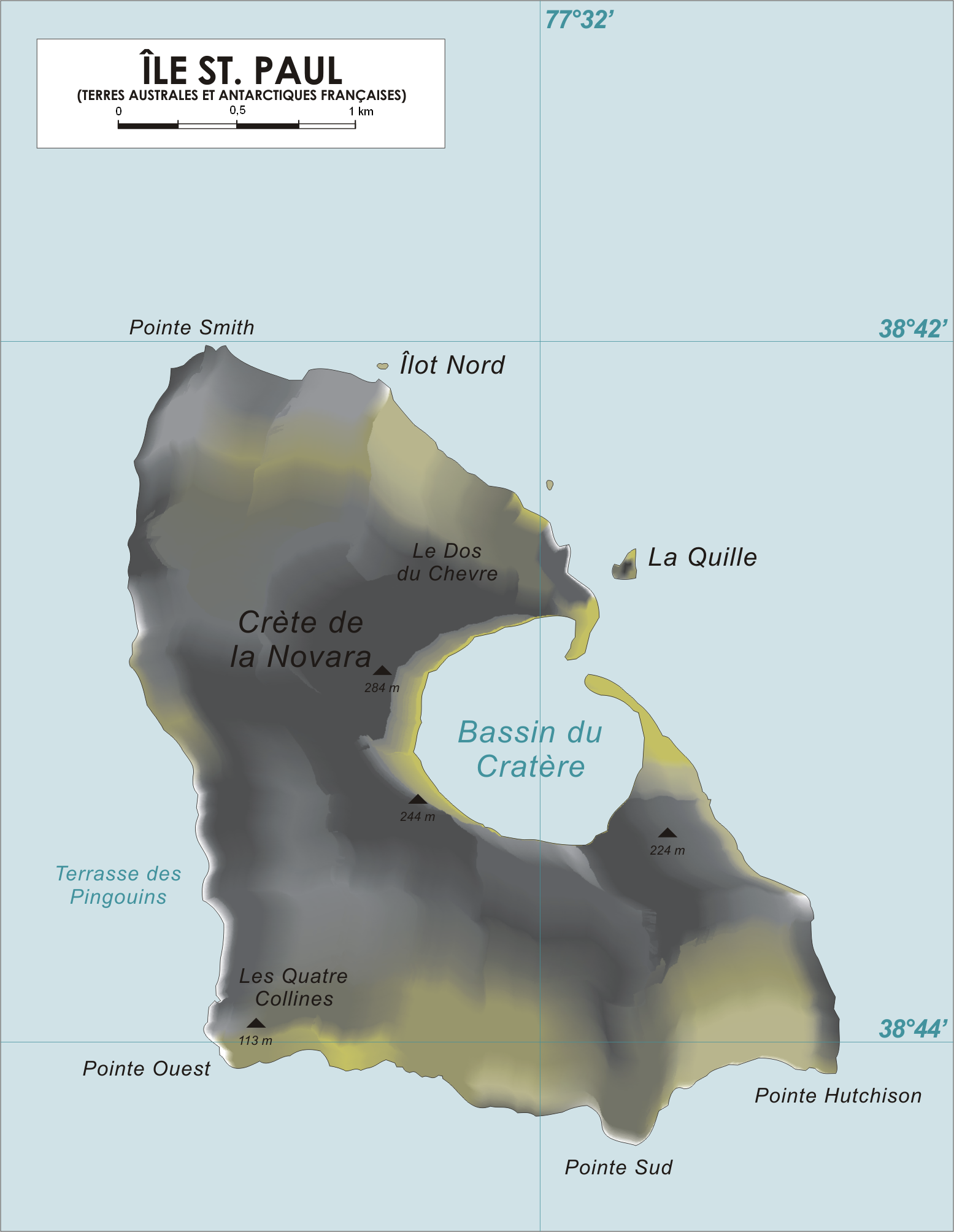
- Map of Île Saint-Paul

- Location within Indian Ocean
- Other name: Saint Paul Island

Geography
- Location: Indian Ocean
- Coordinates: 38°43′S 77°31′E
- Area: 8.3 km^{2} (3.2 sq mi)
- Length: 5 km (3.1 mi)
- Highest elevation: 268 m (879 ft)
- Highest point: Crête de la Novara

Administration
- France
- Overseas territory: French Southern and Antarctic Lands
- District: Saint Paul and Amsterdam Islands

Demographics
- Population: Uninhabited

UNESCO World Heritage Site
- Part of: French Austral Lands and Seas
- Criteria: Natural: vii, ix, x
- Reference: 1603bis-003
- Inscription: 2019 (43rd Session)

Île Saint-Paul (French pronunciation: [il sɛ̃ pɔl], "Saint Paul Island") is an island forming part of the French Southern and Antarctic Lands (French: Terres australes et antarctiques françaises, TAAF) in the Indian Ocean, with an area of 6 km^{2} (2.3 sq mi; 1,500 acres). The island is located about 90 km (56 mi) south of the larger Île Amsterdam 55 km^{2} (21 sq mi), 1,300 kilometres (810 mi) northeast of the Kerguelen Islands, and 3,000 km (1,900 mi) southeast of Réunion.

It is an important breeding site for seabirds. A scientific research cabin on the island is used for scientific or ecological short campaigns, but there is no permanent population. It is under the authority of a senior administrator on Réunion.

== Geography ==
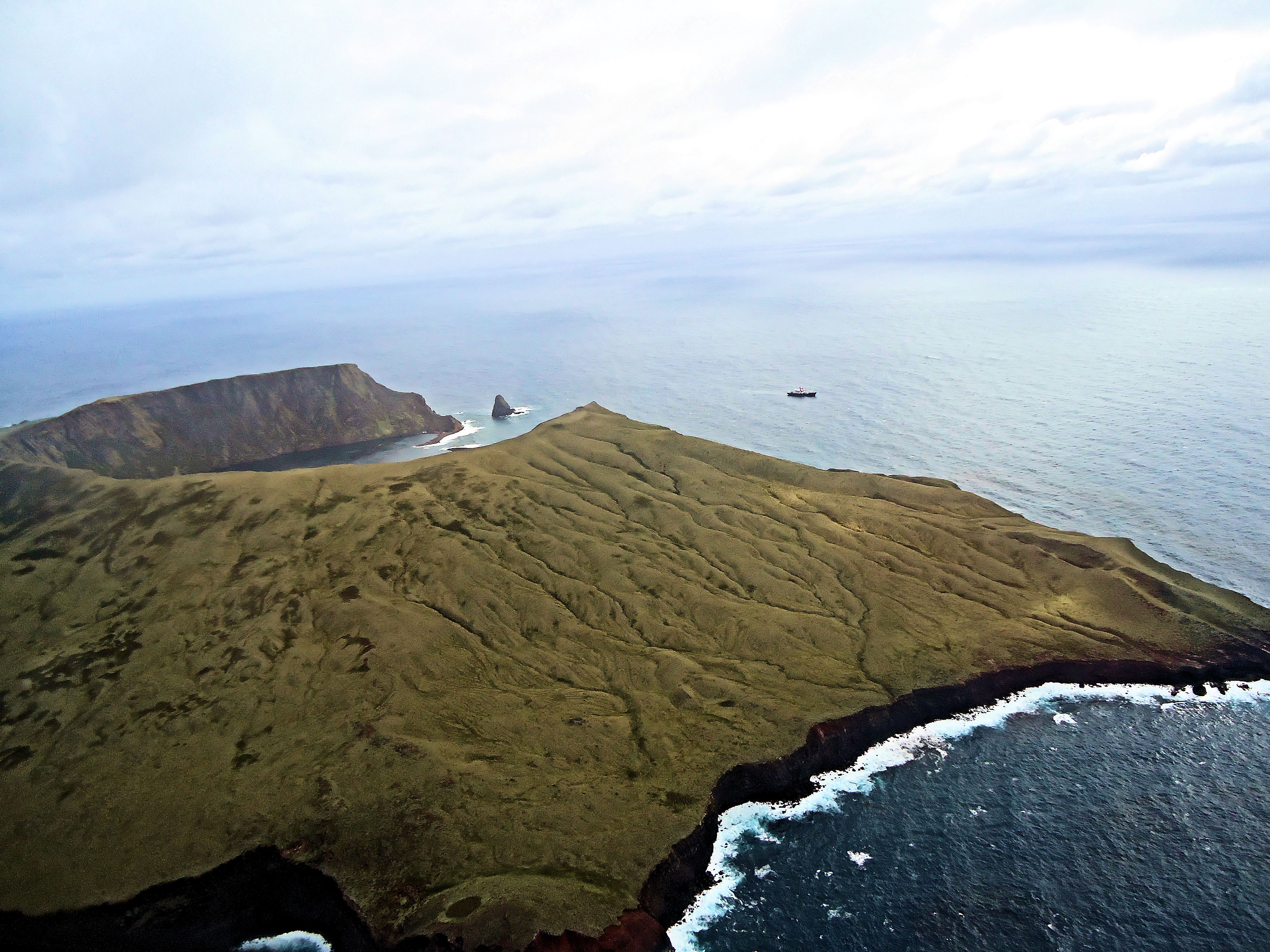
View due north.

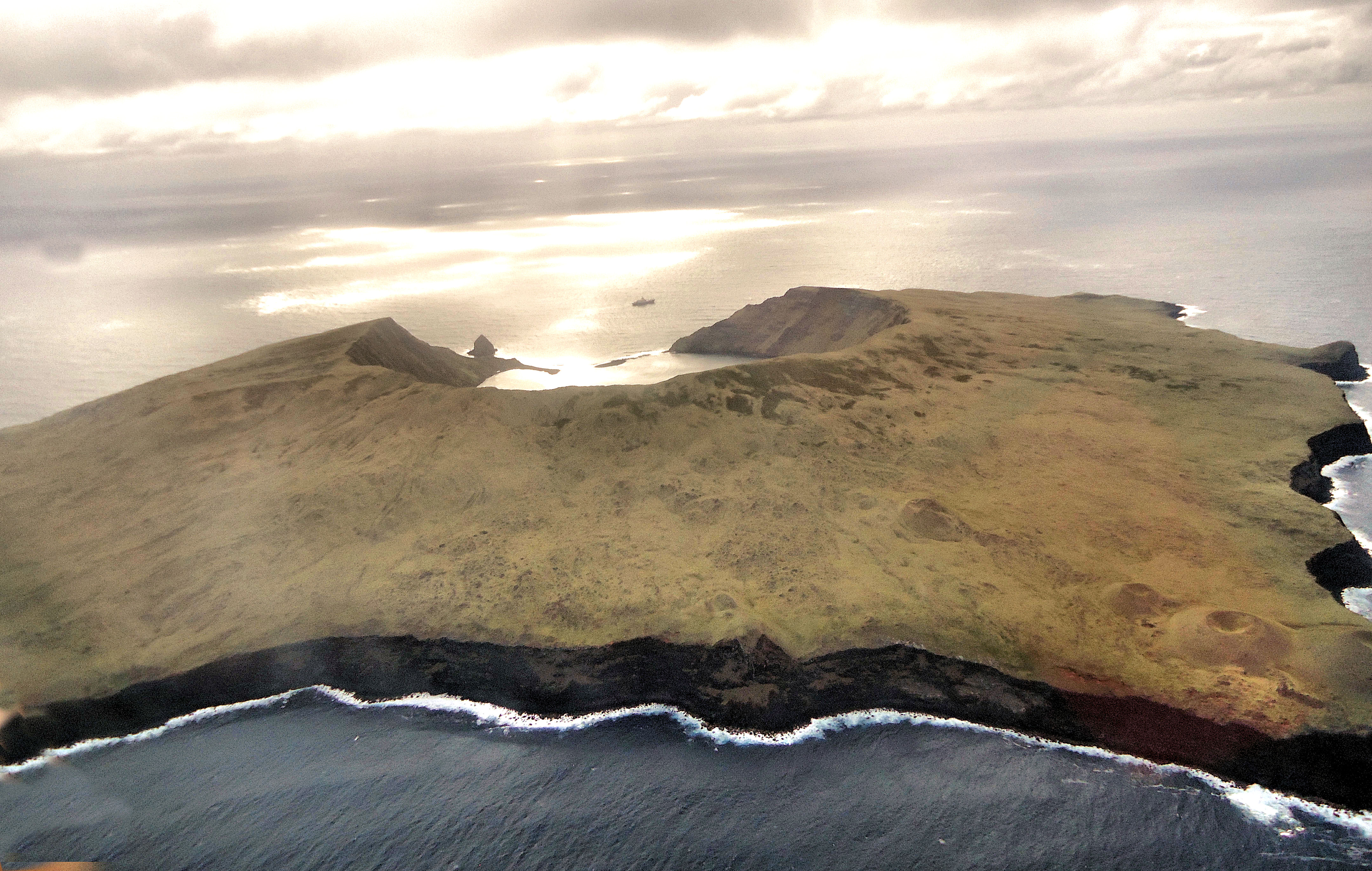
View due north-east.

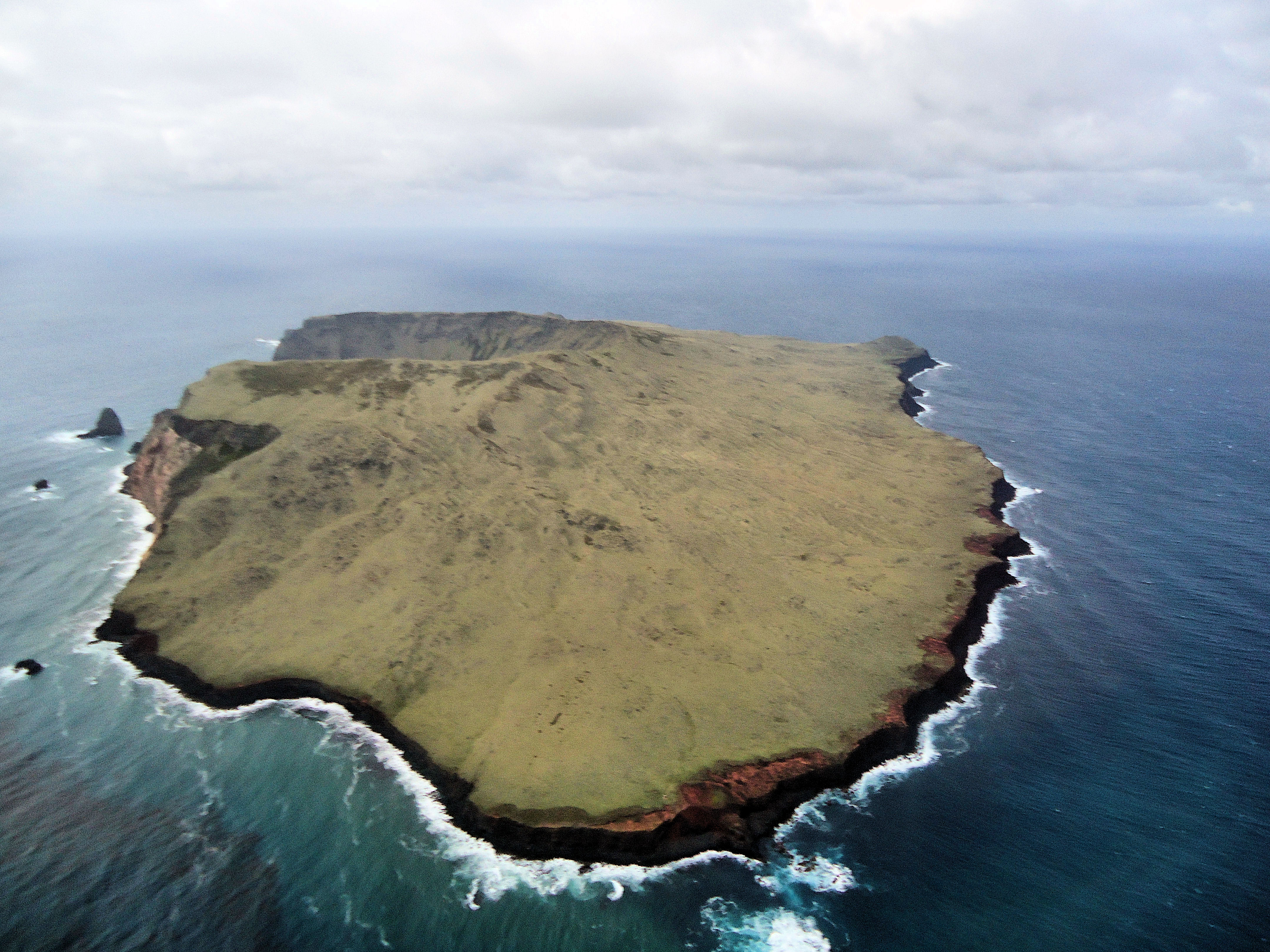
View due south-east.

Île Saint-Paul is a volcanic island with a triangular shape that measures no more than 5 km (3.1 mi) at its widest point. It is the top of an active volcano; the volcano last erupted in 1793 (from its SW flank), and is rocky with steep cliffs on the east side. The thin stretch of rock that used to close off the crater collapsed in 1780, admitting the sea through a 100 m (330 ft) channel; the entrance is only a few meters deep, thus allowing only very small ships or boats to enter the crater. The interior basin, 1 km (0.62 mi) wide and 50 m (160 ft) deep, is surrounded by steep walls up to 270 m (890 ft) high. There are active thermal springs.

The island is antipodal of Cheyenne County, Colorado, one of the few places in the continental United States with a non-oceanic antipode.

=== Geology ===
The island is located on the mainly under sea Amsterdam-Saint Paul Plateau which is of volcanic hotspot origin, with the currently active Amsterdam-Saint Paul hotspot believed to be located close to the island. The aphyric (no phenocrysts) basalts found on Saint Paul are distinct from other basalts found to date on the Amsterdam-Saint Paul Plateau, being mildly alkalic, incompatible element-enriched and highly fractionated. The island is no more than 400,000 years old and was formed by magma that was a simple binary mixture between upper mantle and the Amsterdam-Saint Paul hotspot plume.

== History ==
=== Early sightings ===
Île Saint-Paul was first discovered in 1559 by the Portuguese. The island was mapped, described in detail and recorded in paintings by members of the crew of the nau São Paulo, among them Father Manuel Álvares and the chemist Henrique Dias. Álvares and Dias correctly calculated the latitude as 38° South. The ship was commanded by Rui Melo da Câmara and was part of the Portuguese India Armada commanded by Jorge de Sousa. The São Paulo, which also carried women and had sailed from Europe and stopped in Brazil, would be the subject of a dramatic and moving story of survival after it sank south of Sumatra.

The next confirmed sighting was made by Dutchman Harwick Claesz de Hillegom on 19 April 1618. There were further sightings of the island through the 17th century. One of the first detailed descriptions of it, and possibly the first landing, was made in December 1696 by Willem de Vlamingh.

=== 19th century ===
In sailing-ship days captains would occasionally use the island as a check on their navigation before heading north. Saint-Paul was occasionally visited by explorers, fishermen, and sealers in the 18th and 19th centuries, among which was the American sealer General Gates, which called at the island in April 1819. George William Robinson, an American sealer, was left on the island to hunt seals, and stayed there for 23 months until the General Gates returned for him in March 1821. Robinson subsequently returned to Saint-Paul in 1826 to gather sealskin, sailing from Hobart aboard his own vessel, the schooner Hunter.

The sealing period lasted from 1789 to 1876. Sealing visits are recorded by 60 vessels, four of which ended in shipwreck. Sealing era relics include the ruins of huts and inscriptions.

France's claim to the island dates from 1843, when a Capitain Mieroslawski re-discovered the island with a group of fishermen from Réunion; interested in setting up a fishery on Saint-Paul, Mieroslawski pressed the Governor of Réunion to take possession of both Saint-Paul and Amsterdam Island. This was performed by means of an official decree dated 8 June 1843, and on 1 July, Martin Dupeyrat, commanding the ship L'Olympe, landed on Amsterdam Island and then on Saint-Paul on 3 July, and hoisted the tricolor. Surviving evidence of this claim is an inscribed rock situated on the edge of Saint-Paul's crater lake, inscribed "Pellefournier Emile Mazarin de Noyarez, Grenoble, Canton de Sassenage, Département de l'Isère, 1844". The decree giving the islands St Paul and Amsterdam in possession of Mieroslawski is located in Archives Maritimes in Paris. All fishery operations were, however, abandoned in 1853, when the French government renounced its possession of the two islands.

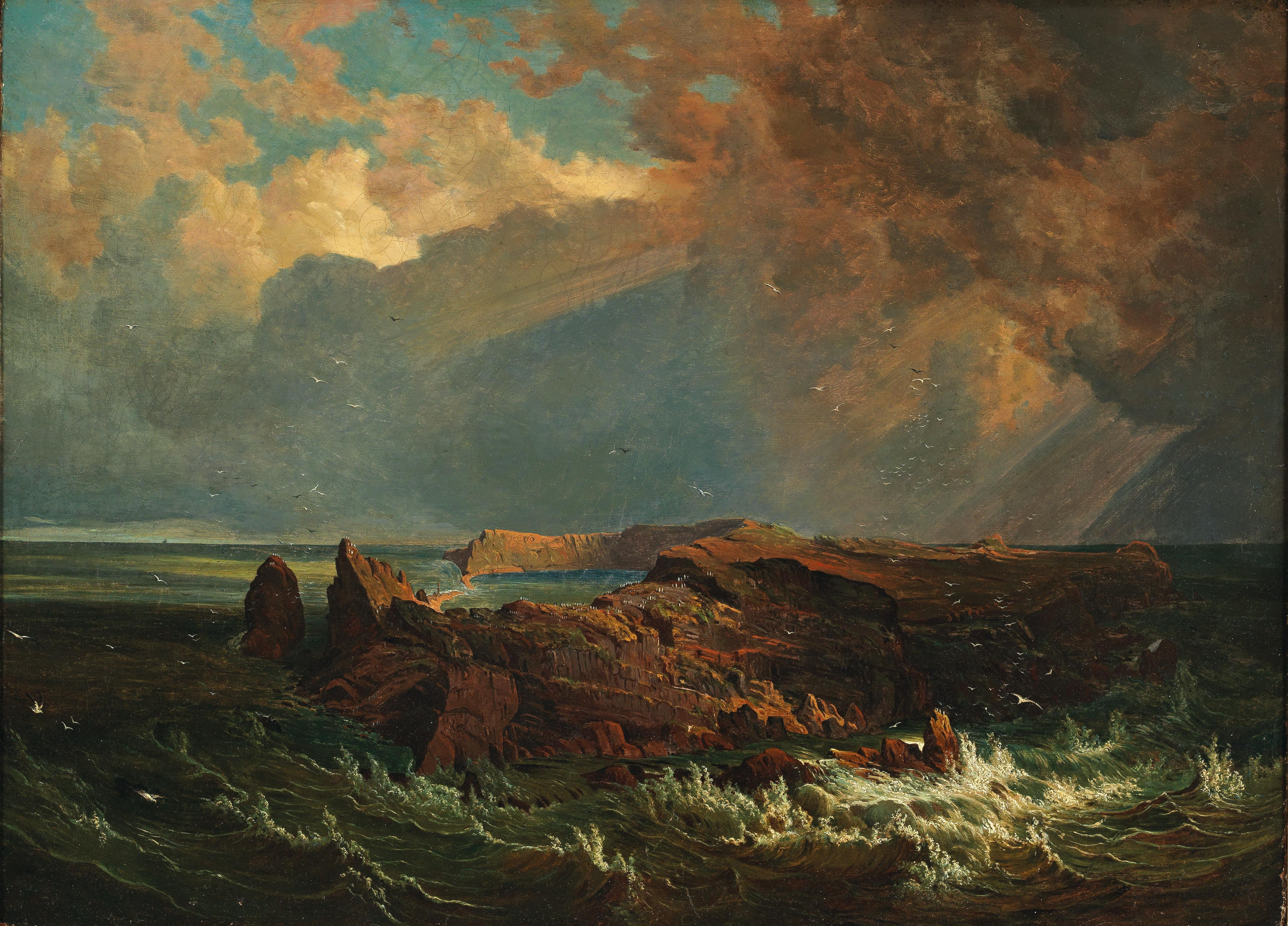
The island drawn by Josef Selleny who went to the island with the Novara in 1857.

The first good map of the island was not drawn up until 1857, when the Austrian frigate Novara landed a team which studied the flora, fauna, and geology from November to December.

On the 2nd of January 1865, the Confederate warship, the CSS Shenandoah, stopped briefly at Saint-Paul on its way to Australia. The ship had difficulty passing through the thick kelp field growing in the island's sheltered interior harbor. Several sailors explored the island and returned with a penguin, some eggs, and a chicken. They also surprised two French fishermen who informed the Confederates that they were used to seeing no one for six to eight months of the year.

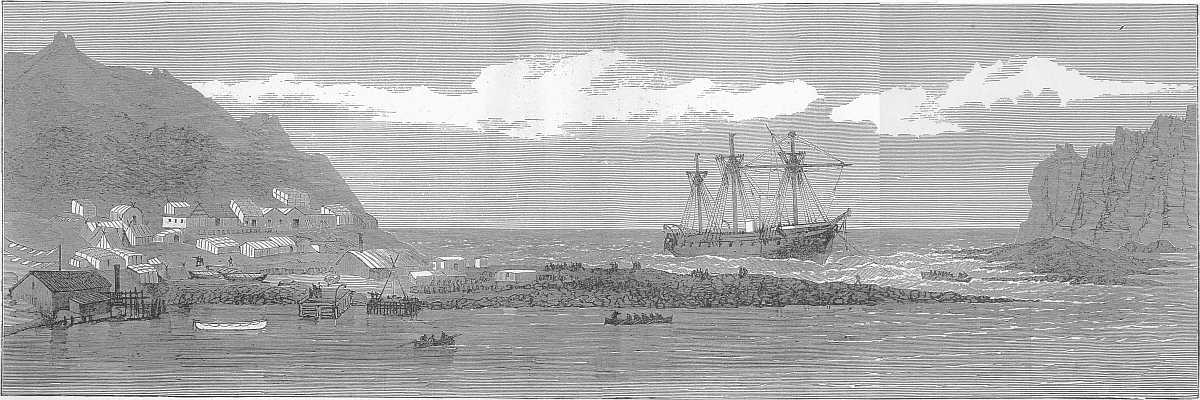
HMS Megaera at Saint Paul Island.

In 1871, a British troop transport, HMS Megaera, was wrecked on the island. Most of the 400 persons on board had to remain upwards of three months before being rescued. A short, impressionistic account of the two French residents encountered by the shipwrecked crew appears in Judith Schalansky's Atlas of Remote Islands (2010).

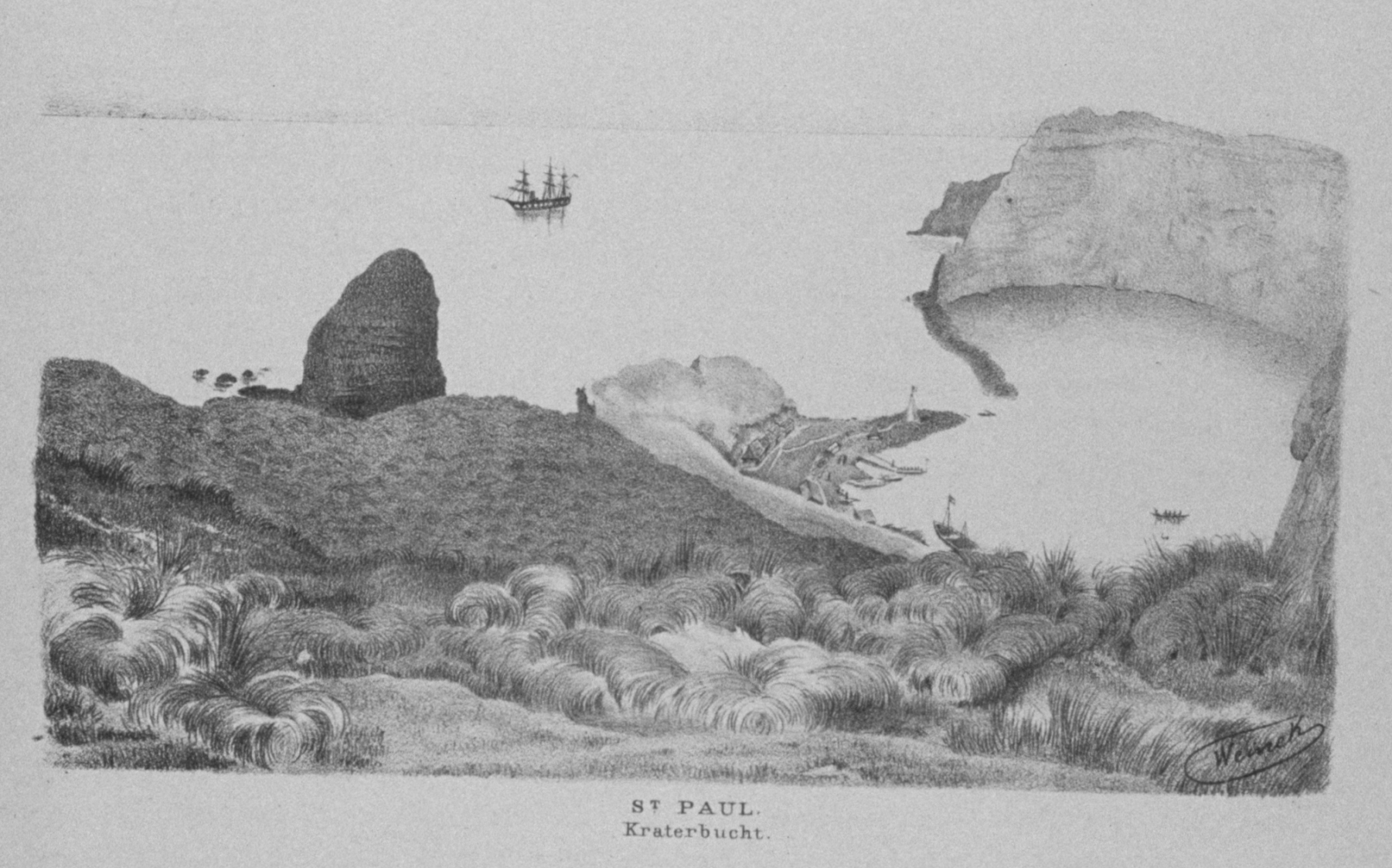
SMS Gazelle anchored (drawn 1874).

In September 1874, a French astronomical mission conveyed by the sailing ship La Dive spent just over three months on Saint-Paul to observe the transit of Venus; geologist Charles Vélain took the opportunity to make a significant geological survey of the island.

In 1889, Charles Lightoller, who was later to become famous as the Second Officer of the RMS Titanic, whose sinking he survived, was shipwrecked here for eight days when the sailing barque Holt Hill ran aground. He describes the shipwreck and the island in his autobiography, Titanic and Other Ships. Lightoller speculated that pirates used the island and their treasure could be buried in its caves.

In 1892, the crew of the French sloop Bourdonnais, followed by the ship L'Eure in 1893, again took possession of Saint-Paul and Amsterdam Island in the name of the French government.

=== 20th century ===
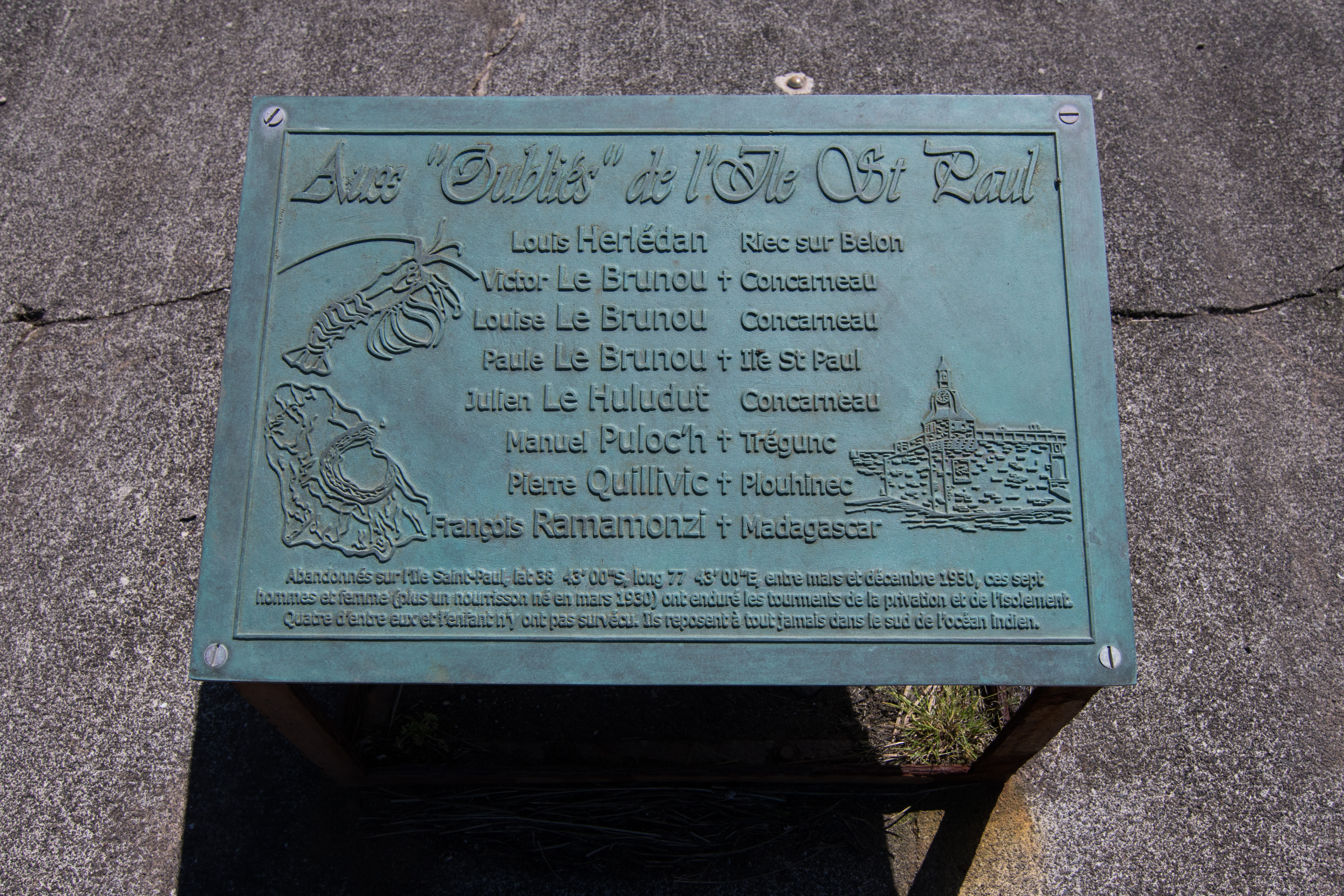
Commemoration at the site of the fishery ruins

In 1928, the Compagnie Générale des Îles Kerguelen recruited René Bossière and several Bretons and Madagascans to establish a spiny lobster cannery on Saint-Paul, "La Langouste Française". In March 1930, at the end of the second season, most of the employees left, but seven of them stayed on the island to guard the installations, supposedly for just a few months. The promised relief arrived much too late. When the ship finally came, in December 1930, five people had died, mostly from lack of food and scurvy: Paule Brunou (a child born on the island who died two months after her birth), Emmanuel Puloc'h, François Ramamonzi, Victor Brunou, and Pierre Quillivic. Only three survivors were rescued. This event has since come to be known as Les Oubliés de Saint-Paul ("the forgotten ones of Saint Paul").

A few years later in 1938, the crew of a French fishing boat was stranded on the island. Distress calls sent by the crew over short-wave radio were fortuitously received 11,000 miles away in the United States. The message was relayed to the Navy and the French consul in San Francisco, while 12-year-old Neil Taylor, an amateur radio operator in California, made contact with the stranded crew and assured them that help was on the way.

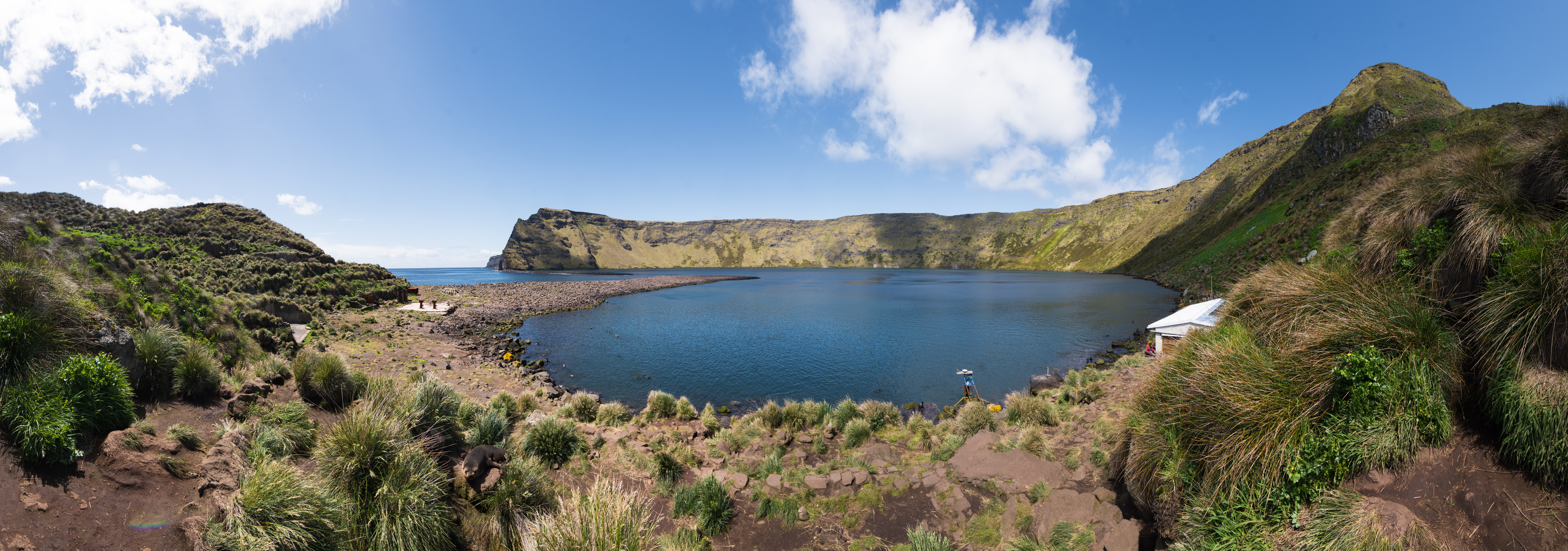
Panorama picture from inside the crater, with castaway shelter to the right and the remains of the fishing station to the left.

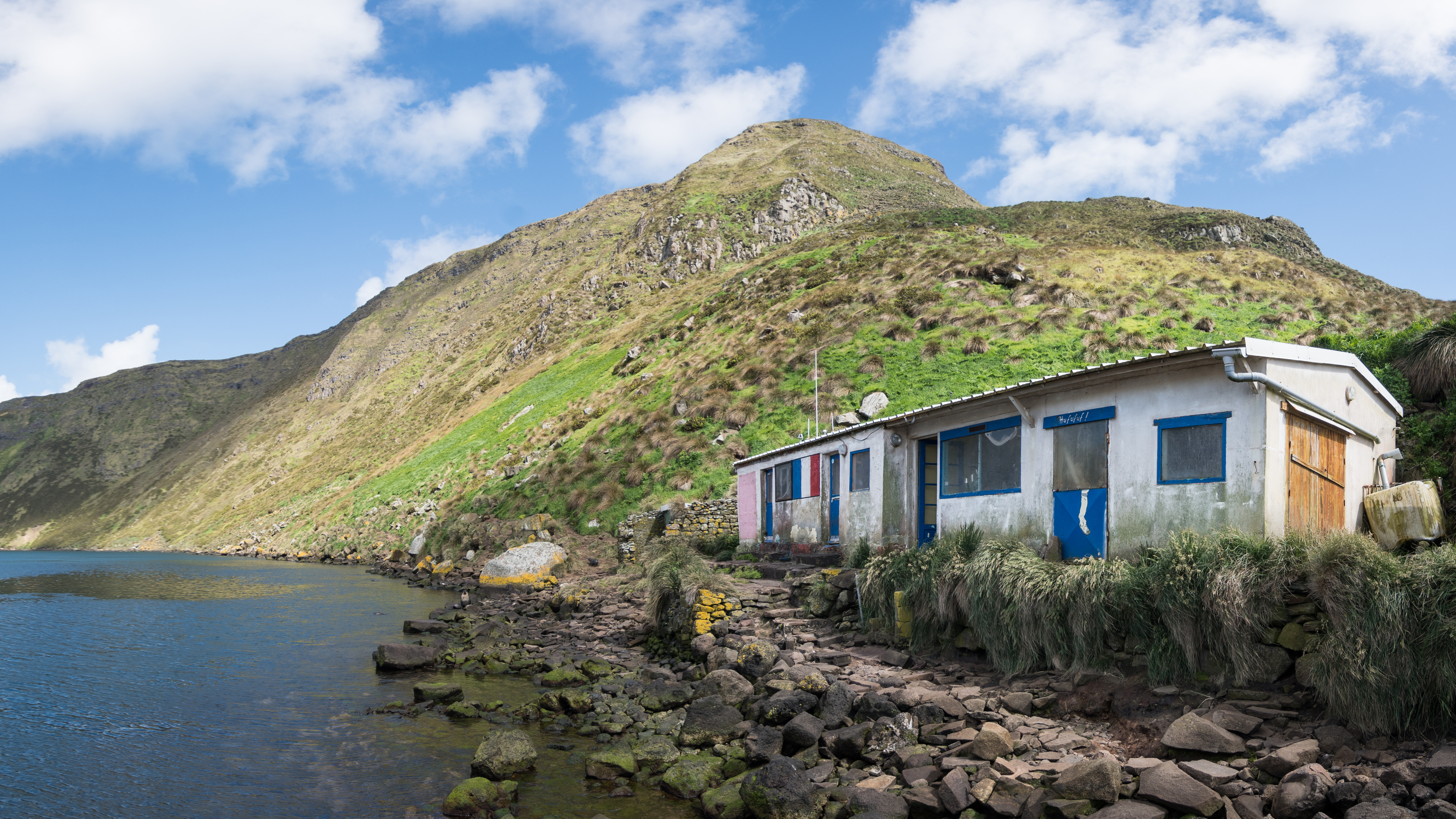
View of the castaway shelter.

== Environment ==
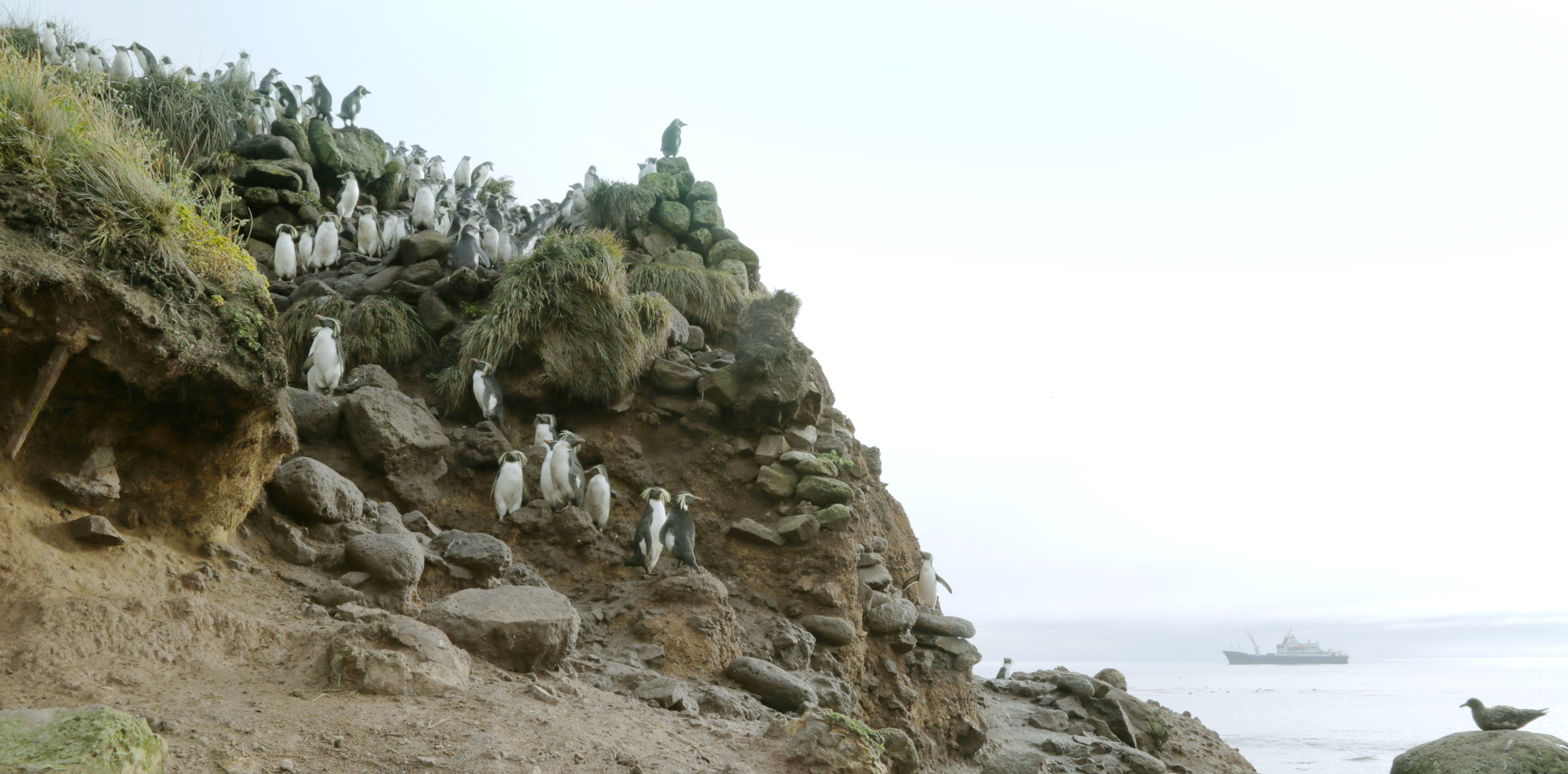
Penguins on the island.

The island has a cool oceanic climate and the slopes of the volcano are covered in grass. It is a breeding site for subantarctic fur seals, southern elephant seals and rockhopper penguins. It was also the breeding site for an endemic flightless duck and several kinds of petrel before the introduction of exotic predators and herbivores, including black rats, house mice, European rabbits, pigs and goats during the 19th century or earlier. The pigs and goats have since disappeared or been eradicated. Black rats were eradicated in January 1997 following an aerial drop of 13.5 tonnes of brodifacoum anticoagulant poison baits over the island.

=== Important Bird Area ===
The island, with the adjacent islet of Quille Rock, has been identified as an Important Bird Area (IBA) by BirdLife International because it supports several breeding seabirds. The island's subtropical location gives it an avifauna distinct from that of subantarctic islands and contains several breeding species which are rare in the region. Saint Paul's seabirds nested mainly on Quille Rock until rat eradication allowed some species, notably MacGillivray's prions and great-winged petrels, to recolonise the main island. Other species include a colony of some 9000 pairs of northern rockhopper penguins, about 20 pairs of sooty albatrosses, a few pairs of Indian yellow-nosed albatrosses, and small numbers of Australasian gannets, fairy prions, little and flesh-footed shearwaters, Wilson's storm petrels and sooty terns. The island might once have had a species of duck as a painting from 1793 shows one. However, it is not clear if this is conspecific with the Amsterdam wigeon (Mareca marecula) or a separate taxon. No specimens have been found though, so the existence of this cannot be proven.

== See also ==
- List of volcanoes in French Southern and Antarctic Lands
- Administrative divisions of France
- French overseas departments and territories
- Islands controlled by France in the Indian and Pacific oceans
- List of Antarctic and subantarctic islands
- Temperate grasslands, savannas, and shrublands
