= My Father's Wives =

Novel by José Eduardo Agualusa

- Author: José Eduardo Agualusa
- Language: Portuguese

My Father's Wives is a novel by the Angolan author José Eduardo Agualusa published in 2008 by Arcadia Books (London, England). It was translated by Daniel Hahn from Portuguese: As Mulheres do Meu Pai, published in 2007 by Editora Língua Geral (Rio de Janeiro, Brazil) and Publicações Dom Quixote (Lisbon, Portugal).

Upon his death, the famous Angolan composer Faustino Manso left seven widows and 18 children. His youngest daughter, Laurentina, a filmmaker, tries to reconstruct the late musician's turbulent life. In My Father’s Wives, reality and fiction run side by side, the former feeding into the latter. However, in the territories Agualusa crosses, fiction plays a part in reality too. The four characters in the novel which the author is writing as he travels accompany him from Luanda, the Angolan capital to Benguela and Namibe (now Moçâmedes). They cross the Namibian sands and their ghost towns, reaching Cape Town. They carry on to Maputo, then Quelimane beside the Bons Sinais River, and then to the island of Mozambique. They cross landscapes that border dreams, landscapes from which – here and there – the strangest characters emerge. My Father's Wives is a novel about women, music and magic. These pages herald the rebirth of Africa, a continent afflicted by terrible problems but blessed with a talent for music, by the ever-renewed strength of its women and the secret power of ancient gods.

== Reception and criticism ==
In The Independent newspaper, Boyd Tonkin called the work "rich in historical sidelights and deft character-sketches", continuing: "A radiant humour and humanity speeds his novel through its picaresque twists and turns."

In The Guardian, Jennie Erdal cites "an artful mix of fact, reportage, politics, poetry and personal confession, not to mention mountainous dollops of sheer unadulterated invention - all dispatched in short episodic chapters and musical, rhythmic prose." She praises further: "Agualusa, master of multiple perspectives, remains impressively in control. The result is a giant melting pot, exuding intoxicating fumes of love and death that permeate the exotic, chaotic sweep of southern Africa."
