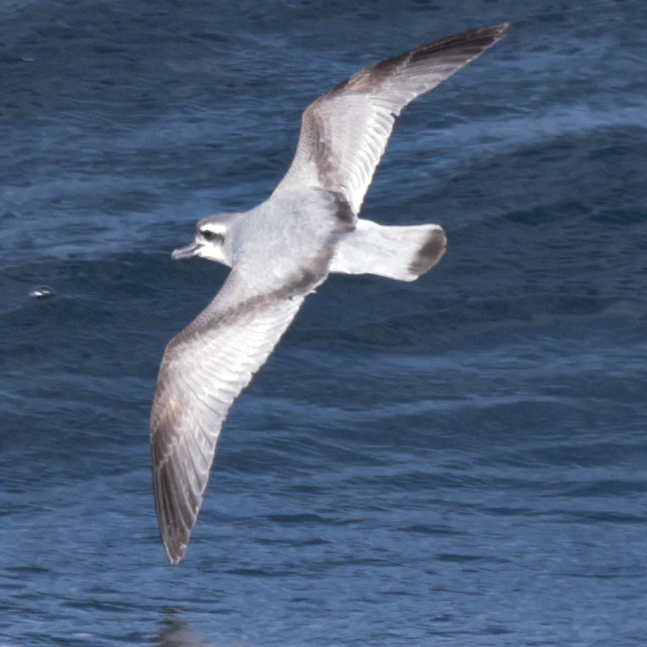

Conservation status
- Critically Endangered (IUCN 3.1)

Scientific classification
- Kingdom: Animalia
- Phylum: Chordata
- Class: Aves
- Order: Procellariiformes
- Family: Procellariidae
- Genus: Pachyptila
- Species: P. macgillivrayi

Binomial name
- Pachyptila macgillivrayi (Mathews, 1912)

= MacGillivray's prion =

Species of bird

MacGillivray's prion (Pachyptila macgillivrayi) is a species of small petrel (a prion) in the Southern Ocean. It is found on Roche Quille, off Saint Paul Island and on Gough Island in the Tristan da Cunha group, south-central Atlantic Ocean. It was formerly present on Amsterdam Island in the central South Indian Ocean. The population on Saint Paul Island has been increasing since the 1990s eradication of introduced rats and rabbits, but is still likely smaller than the original size.

MacGillivray's prion was formerly considered to be conspecific with Salvin's prion but is now considered to be a separate species based on molecular phylogenetic analysis and a comparison of the bill morphologies that was published in 2022.

MacGillivray's prions moult for longer than other prion species.

Their diet and foraging habits are generally unknown, but they are hypothesized to feed on small zooplankton.
