= Continuum International Publishing Group =

Academic publisher of books

- Founded: 1999
- Founder: Werner Mark Linz
- Defunct: September 2012
- Successor: Bloomsbury Academic
- Country of origin: United Kingdom
- Headquarters location: London, New York City
- Publication types: Books
- Imprints: Burns & Oates, T&T Clark
- Official website: bloomsbury.com

Continuum International Publishing Group was an academic publisher of books with editorial offices in London and New York City. It was purchased by Nova Capital Management in 2005. In July 2011, it was taken over by Bloomsbury Publishing. From September 2012, all new Continuum titles were published under the Bloomsbury name (under the imprint Bloomsbury Academic).

== History ==
Continuum International was created in 1999 with the merger of the Cassell academic and religious lists (including Geoffrey Chapman, Mansell, Mowbray, Pinter, and Leicester University Press imprints) and the Continuum Publishing Company, founded in New York in 1980.

The academic publishing programme was focused on the humanities, especially the fields of philosophy, film and music, literature, education, linguistics, theology, and biblical studies. Continuum published Paulo Freire's seminal Pedagogy of the Oppressed and music criticism series 33 1/3.

Continuum acquired Athlone Press, which was founded in 1948 as the University of London publishing house and sold to the Bemrose Corporation in 1979.

In 2003, Continuum acquired the London-based Hambledon & London (Sunday Times Small Publisher of the Year 2001–02), a publisher of trade history for the general reader.

== Imprints ==
- Burns & Oates
- Hambledon Continuum – history-publishing imprint
- T&T Clark
- Thoemmes Press
