= Atlas of Remote Islands =

2008 non-fiction book by Judith Schalansky

Atlas of Remote Islands: Fifty Islands I Have Never Set Foot On and Never Will
- Cover of Atlas
- Author: Judith Schalansky
- Translator: Christine Lo
- Language: German
- Subject: Remote islands
- Genre: Atlas
- Publisher: Mare Verlag, Penquin Books
- Publication date: 2009
- Publication place: Germany
- English publication date: 2010
- Awards: Most Beautiful German Book of the Year (2009); German Design Award(2011); Red Dot Design Award(2011)
- ISBN: 978-0-14311820-6

Atlas of Remote Islands: Fifty Islands I Have Never Set Foot On and Never Will (Atlas der abgelegenen Inseln fünfzig Inseln, auf denen ich nie war und niemals sein werde) is a book by Judith Schalansky originally published in Germany in 2009 by Mareverlag (ISBN 978-3866481176). The atlas contains maps of 50 islands chosen by the author with accompanying descriptions of their natural and human histories, often written in a subjective, impressionistic style. It was the winner of the prize for the most beautiful German book of the year in 2009, the German Design Award in 2011, and the Red Dot Design Award in 2011. The English translation by Christine Lo was published by Penguin Books in 2010 under this title (ISBN 978-0-14311820-6) or (in 2012) as Pocket Atlas of Remote Islands: Fifty Islands I Have Not Visited and Never Will (ISBN 978-1-84614348-9).

The book is divided into chapters for each ocean, presenting the islands in this order:

Arctic Ocean
- Lonely Island
- Bear Island
- Rudolf Island

Atlantic Ocean

- St. Kilda
- Ascension Island
- Brava
- Annobón
- St. Helena
- Trindade
- Bouvet Island
- Tristan da Cunha
- Southern Thule

Indian Ocean

- Saint Paul Island
- South Keeling Islands
- Possession Island
- Diego Garcia
- Amsterdam Island
- Christmas Island
- Tromelin

Pacific Ocean

- Napuka
- Rapa Iti
- Robinson Crusoe
- Howland Island
- Macquarie Island
- Fangataufa
- Atlasov Island
- Taongi Atoll
- Norfolk Island
- Pukapuka
- Antipodes Islands
- Floreana
- Banaba
- Campbell Island
- Pingelap
- Easter Island
- Pitcairn Island
- Semisopochnoi
- Clipperton Island
- Raoul Island
- Socorro Island
- Iwo Jima
- St. George Island
- Tikopia
- Pagan
- Cocos Island
- Takuu

Antarctic Ocean

- Laurie Island
- Deception Island
- Franklin Island
- Peter I Island
