= Bettina Hoppe =

German actress (born 1974)

- Born: 21 May 1974 (age 52); Nairobi, Kenya
- Occupation: Actress
- Partner: Judith Schalansky

Bettina Hoppe (born 21 May 1974) is a German actress.

== Career ==
Hoppe received her acting training from 1996 to 2000 at the Berlin University of the Arts. After completing her studies, she worked at the Deutsches Theater Berlin from 2000 to 2001 and at the Maxim-Gorki-Theater from 2001 to 2006. She was a permanent member of the ensemble at the Schaubühne Berlin from 2006 to 2009, Schauspiel Frankfurt from 2009 to 2014, and since 2017 at the Berliner Ensemble. For her portrayal of Cäcilie in Goethe's Stella, she was honored as best actress at the Hessische Theatertage in 2011 and was nominated for the Der Faust theatre prize. Bettina Hoppe lives with her partner, the writer Judith Schalansky, and their daughter in Berlin.

== Personal life ==
Hoppe currently lives in Berlin with her partner, writer Judith Schalansky. On 5 February 2021, she was one of the 185 signatories of the #ActOut manifesto.
