= Caroline McCormick =

British cultural sector leader and consultant

Caroline McCormick Hon. FRSL
- Born: England
- Education: University of Manchester (MA)
- Occupations: Cultural sector leader and consultant
- Known for: Founder of Achates consultancy
- Spouse: Bill Swainson
- Website: achates.org.uk

Caroline McCormick Hon. FRSL is a British cultural sector leader and consultant, noted for her work in the arts and philanthropy. She is the founder and director of Achates, a strategy, fundraising and recruitment consultancy established in 2014 to help arts and cultural organisations build resilience. McCormick also founded the Achates Philanthropy Prize, a national award programme celebrating first-time supporters of the arts, and co-founded the London Ticket Bank. She chairs the Cultural Philanthropy Foundation, which campaigns for the democratisation of culture.

== Background ==
McCormick began her career in arts management as Head of Trust Fundraising at the National Theatre in the late 1990s. In 2005, she became the first Director of PEN International, in which capacity she headed 145 centres in 105 countries, as well as being Literature representative at UNESCO and an advisor to Nobel Peace Prize laureate Professor Wangari Maathai. Stepping down as PEN International's executive director after almost five years, McCormick took on the role of lead advisor to the National Theatre on its "NT: Future2 campaign, and to Garsington Opera on its Relocation Appeal.

McCormick has served on the board of trustees of the National Centre for Writing since 2019, and in 2021 she was a judge for the Saif Ghobash Banipal Prize.

McCormick earned an MA degree in Contemporary Writing from the University of Manchester.

In 2026, she was elected an Honorary Fellow of the Royal Society of Literature.

== Personal life ==
McCormick is married to editor and literary consultant Bill Swainson.
