= If This Be Magic =

2026 Daniel Hahn Shakespeare book

If This Be Magic: The Unlikely Art of Shakespeare in Translation
- 2026 Book jacket
- Author: Daniel Hahn
- Audio read by: Daniel Hahn
- Cover artist: Ariel Harar
- Language: English
- Subject: Literary critique, English drama
- Genre: Nonfiction
- Published: April 21, 2006
- Publisher: Alfred A. Knopf
- Media type: Print, E-book, Audio
- Pages: 416
- ISBN: 9780593801666
- OCLC: 1529584121
- Website: Official website

If This Be Magic: The Unlikely Art of Shakespeare in Translation is a nonfiction book written by Daniel Hahn and published by Alfred A. Knopf on April 2, 2026.

== Reception ==
John McWhorter writing for The New York Times says, "The impossibility of a real through line ultimately means that the book is a little too... generous. It could lose... 100 pages of its 400 and remain the fine thing that it is... for some readers, Hahn will seem to overdo [a chatty tone] in spots... The book is a kind of master class in translation, a chronicle of the author’s healthy obsession, and a great way to catch up with Shakespeare’s work. We should know how people experience Shakespeare worldwide if, as Harold Bloom taught us, his work was “the invention of the human.” Hahn’s tour makes a lovely case for that.

The Wall Street Journal reviewer says, "If This Be Magic is both a subtle, probing study of [multinational translators'] handiwork and a deliciously fresh reading of Shakespeare, a writer adept at 'making English do things that English doesn’t do.' It is a stirring celebration of the plurality of languages, replete with snippets of Hungarian, Russian, Yiddish and even Klingon. Within a single page Mr. Hahn can hop from Esperanto to Turkish to Hindi. Spare a thought for whoever records the audiobook.

Steven Poole, authoring a review for The Guardian says, "A superbly diverting book about language and creativity... Hahn’s project is to argue that “Shakespeare with every word changed can still be great... By the end of the book, Hahn has amply demonstrated not only the treasures of other languages, but also the rich and strange inexhaustibility of Shakespeare himself."

According to Dear Author blog writer, Jayne, "Shakespeare may have breathed the air of sixteenth-century England, but today, all the world is his stage. Every year, millions of people, from Bogotá to Borneo, read Hamlet for the first time, thanks to the tireless work of translators. Drawing on the work of the very best of them, Hahn dives into the infinitesimally complicated ways the great playwright is reinvented and yet sounds, somehow, like himself—in Chinese, Dutch, Turkish, and more than a hundred other languages."
