= Carl-Amery-Literaturpreis =

German literary award

The Carl Amery Literature Prize was established in 2007 by the Association of German Writers in Bavaria, the Luchterhand Literaturverlag, and Verdi Bayern. The award commemorates Carl Amery and his life's work. It is presented every two years and is endowed with €6,000. The prize honors socially critical German-language authors who "pursue new aesthetic paths and thereby seek to expand the range of literary possibilities."

== Recipients ==
- 2007: Feridun Zaimoglu
- 2009: Juli Zeh
- 2011: Ilija Trojanow
- 2013: Ulrich Peltzer
- 2015: Norbert Niemann
- 2017: Thomas von Steinaecker
- 2019: Karen Duve
- 2022: Judith Schalansky
- 2024: Barbi Marković
