= A General Theory of Oblivion =

2012 novel by José Eduardo Agualusa

- First edition (Portuguese)
- Author: José Eduardo Agualusa
- Original title: Teoria Geral do Esquecimento
- Translator: Daniel Hahn
- Language: Portuguese
- Genre: Fiction
- Published: 2012
- Publisher: Harvill Secker (UK edition); Archipelago Books (US edition)
- Publication place: Angola
- English publication date: June 25, 2015 (UK); December 15, 2015 (USA)
- Media type: Print, digital
- Awards: 2017 International Dublin Literary Award
- ISBN: 978-0-914671-31-2 (first US edition, hardcover)
- Preceded by: Rainy Season

A General Theory of Oblivion (Portuguese: Teoria Geral do Esquecimento) is a 2012 novel by Angolan author José Eduardo Agualusa.

The novel recounts the story of a Portuguese woman who locks herself into her apartment in Angola on the brink of independence. She attempts to cut herself off from the external world for three decades until she meets a young boy who informs her of the radical changes which have occurred in the country in the intervening years. The book may be based on real-life events.

Written in the author's native language of Portuguese, it was translated into English by Daniel Hahn in 2015. The novel marked the continuation of Hahn's long collaboration with Agualusa. The English version of the novel received acclaim from anglophone audiences.

The novel appeared on the short-list for the 2016 Man Booker International Prize, losing to The Vegetarian. The novel was the recipient of the 2017 International Dublin Literary Award, one of the largest literary prizes in the world, with a prize of €100,000.

== Plot ==
=== Background ===
The novel is set in Luanda, on the eve of, and during the immediate aftermath of Angola's independence from Portugal. The war for independence has left the area in a tumultuous and dangerous state, having raged for over twelve years. Moreover, tensions among the anti-colonial forces (funded by the Soviet Union) indicate that there could be continued violence and terror after independence is achieved.

=== Plot ===
The novel revolves around Ludo, a Portuguese woman living in the Angolan capital. In the midst of all the violence and chaos caused by the anti-colonial movement's clashes with Portuguese authorities, she decides to isolate herself from society by bricking herself into her penthouse apartment. She provides sustenance for herself by growing vegetables and luring pigeons into the apartment through a window. She incinerates her furniture to provide heat. The story is told from her perspective over the span of 30 years. The only information that she receives about the outside world and the political situation it faces comes from news reports on the radio, or the conversations of neighbours which she overhears.

This situation is changed when she encounters Sabalu, a young boy who attempts to burgle her apartment. Through their interactions, she uncovers the events which have shaken Angola since her self-ostracisation three decades earlier.

== Critical reception ==
The book, owing to its concept of restricting a protagonist to a specific room, has been compared to Room by Emma Donoghue.

Critics praised Agualusa for his subject matter, stating that he was responsible for opening up "the world of Portuguese-speaking Africa to the English-speaking community." He attracted further critical praise for the manner in which he condensed a cryptic and complicated conflict into a "succinctly summarised and easily understandable" package.

The novel was acknowledged on both the long- and short-lists for the 2016 Man Booker International Prize. It competed under the Prize's revised rules, which place a greater emphasis on translated works. The award was eventually given to The Vegetarian.

The novel was also the recipient of the 2017 International Dublin Literary Award, which, with a monetary reward of €100,000, makes it the 21st largest literary award along with five other awards. In accordance with the rules of the award, Agualusa and Hahn will share the award along a 75%:25% split respectively. Agualusa stated that he intended to use part of the reward to "realise a life-long dream" and construct a public library on the Island of Mozambique, his adopted home.
