= An Inventory of Losses =

Book by Judith Schalansky

First edition

An Inventory of Losses (German: Verzeichnis einiger Verluste) is a book by Judith Schalansky originally published in Germany in 2018 by Suhrkamp Verlag (ISBN 978-3-518-42824-5). It placed fourth in Stiftung Buchkunst's "The Most Beautiful German Books" competition (German: Die schönsten deutschen Bücher) in 2019. Its English translation by Jackie Smith was published in 2020 by New Directions and MacLehose Press and awarded with the German Helen and Kurt Wolff Translator's Prize, the Warwick Prize for Women in Translation and the TA First Translation Prize. It was also longlisted for the 2021 International Booker Prize and 2021 National Book Award for Translated Literature.

The chapters are oriented around twelve of the world's losses, each using a different writing style and having what sometimes might seem only a tangential relation to its title.

== Chapters ==
- Tuanaki
- Caspian Tiger
- Guericke's Unicorn
- Villa Sacchetti
- The Boy in Blue
- The Love Songs of Sappho
- The Von Behr Palace
- The Seven Books of Mani
- Greifswald Harbour
- Encyclopedia in the Wood (Armand Schulthess)
- Palace of the Republic
- Kinau's Selenographs
