= Mark Linz =

German-American publisher

Werner Mark Linz
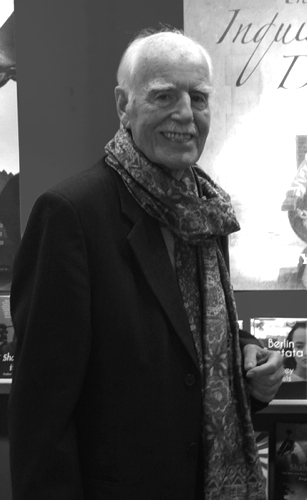
- Mark Linz at Frankfurt Book Fair 2012
- Born: 6 April 1935; Cologne, Germany
- Died: 9 February 2013 (aged 77); London, United Kingdom
- Occupation: Publisher

Werner Mark Linz (6 April 1935 – 9 February 2013) was a German-American publisher who specialised in educational and international publishing in the Americas, Europe and the Middle East. He was born in Cologne, Germany, in 1935. He studied humanities at the University of Frankfurt and continued his education in the United States. In 1960 he moved permanently to New York and became a naturalised United States citizen.

Linz held senior executive position in New York with Herder & Herder, McGraw-Hill, and the Seabury Press in the 1960s and 1970s, before establishing the Continuum and Crossroad publishing companies, and serving as the Continuum Group's president and publisher in New York from 1979 to 1999. He was the co-founder in 2000 of the Continuum International Publishing Group in London and New York.

In 1984 Linz became director of the American University in Cairo Press, first for two years, and then from 1995 until 2011. On returning to Cairo in 1995 he collaborated with Naguib Mahfouz to establish the Naguib Mahfouz Medal for Literature, an annual literary prize for a work of fiction in Arabic, with the guarantee of translation and publication in English for the winner. Among his authors at the AUC Press were Naguib Mahfouz, the first Arabic writer to win the Nobel Prize in Literature, Ahmed Zewail, who won the Nobel Prize in Chemistry, archaeologist Zahi Hawass and Pope Shenouda III, head of the Coptic Church.

Linz retired from the AUC Press in 2011, at the age of seventy-six. He was an active member of the Association of American Publishers, the American Society for Scholarly Publishing and the Publishers Club in New York. A long-time resident of Rye, New York, he was an avid sailor and member of the American Yacht Club.
