= Daniel Hahn =

British writer, editor and translator (born 1973)

Daniel Hahn OBE
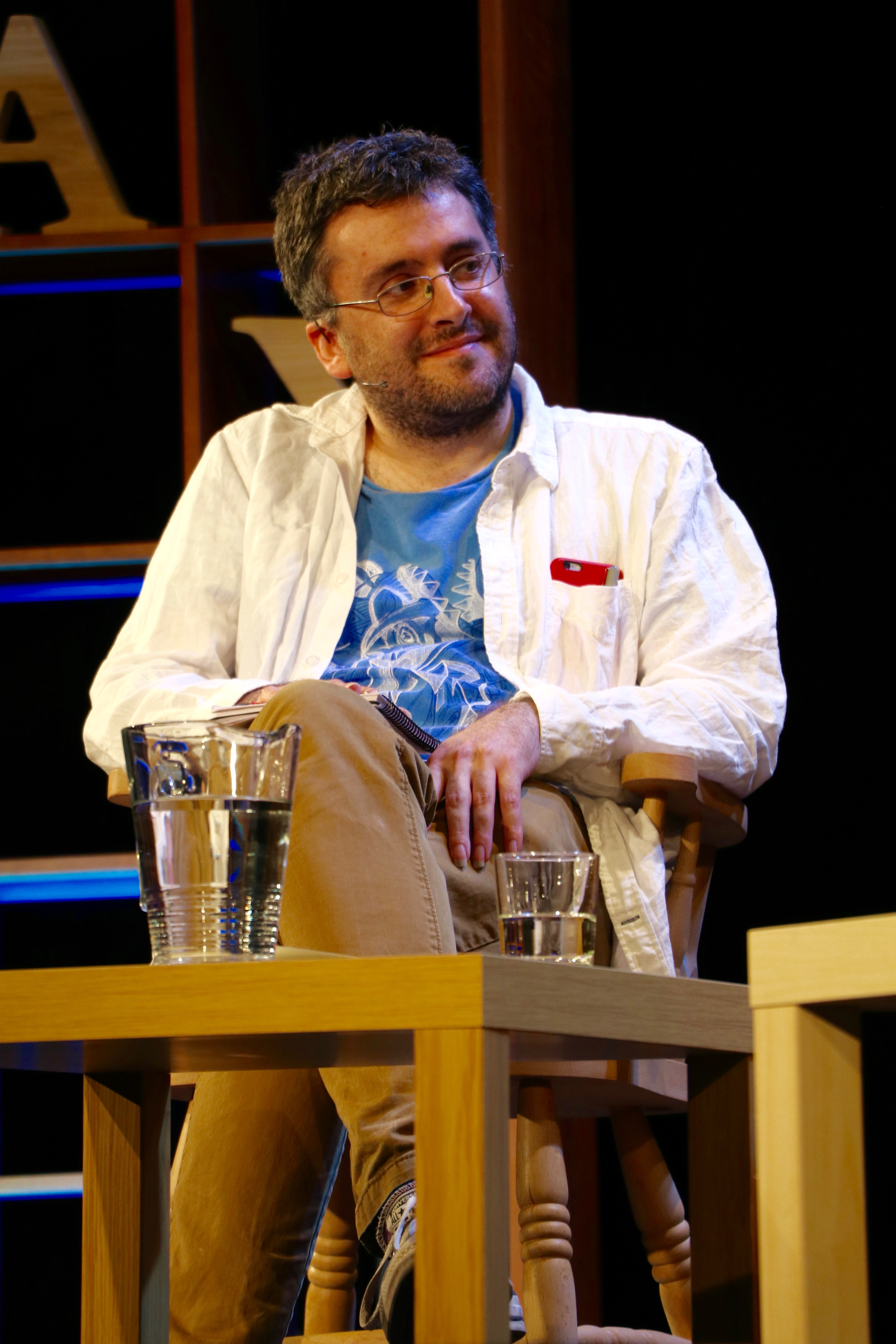
- Hahn at the 2016 Hay Festival
- Born: Daniel Hahn; 26 November 1973 (age 52); London, UK
- Occupations: Author, editor, translator
- Awards: International Dublin Literary Award (2017)
- Website: danielhahn.co.uk

Daniel Hahn OBE (born 26 November 1973) is a British writer, editor and translator.

He is the author of a number of works of non-fiction, including a history book entitled, The Tower Menagerie, and one of the editors of The Ultimate Book Guide, a series of reading guides for children and teenagers, the first volume of which won the Blue Peter Book Award. Other titles include Happiness Is a Watermelon on Your Head (a picture-book for children), The Oxford Guide to Literary Britain and Ireland (a reference book), brief biographies of the poets Samuel Taylor Coleridge and Percy Bysshe Shelley, and a new edition of The Oxford Companion to Children's Literature.

His translation of The Book of Chameleons by José Eduardo Agualusa won the Independent Foreign Fiction Prize in 2007. His translation of A General Theory of Oblivion, also by José Eduardo Agualusa, won the 2017 International Dublin Literary Award, with Hahn receiving 25% of the €100,000 prize. His other translations include Pelé's autobiography and work by novelists José Luís Peixoto, Philippe Claudel, María Dueñas, José Saramago, Eduardo Halfon, Gonçalo M. Tavares, and others.

A former chair of the Translators Association and the Society of Authors, as well as national programme director of the British Centre for Literary Translation, he currently serves on the board of trustees of the Society of Authors and a number of other organisations working with literature, literacy and free expression, including English PEN, The Children's Bookshow and Modern Poetry in Translation.

In 2017, Hahn donated half his winnings from the International Dublin Literary Award to help establish a new prize for debut literary translation – the TA First Translation Prize.

Hahn was appointed Officer of the Order of the British Empire (OBE) in the 2020 Birthday Honours for services to literature. He was elected a Fellow of the Royal Society of Literature in the same year.

Hahn has served as a judge for several literary prizes, including the PEN Pinter Prize in 2022 (alongside Ruth Borthwick and Margaret Busby), with the winner that year being Malorie Blackman – the first time that an author of children's and Young Adult books received the accolade.

Hahn won the 2023 Ottaway Award for the Promotion of International Literature.

Three of Hahn's literary translations have been longlisted for the International Booker Prize, with his Portuguese to English translation of José Eduardo Agualusa's A General Theory of Oblivion making the shortlist in 2016. In 2022, Hahn's Portuguese to English translation of Paulo Scott's Phenotypes was longlisted for the Prize. And in 2024, Rodrigo Blanco Calderón's Simpatía, which Hahn co-translated from Spanish into English with Noel Hernández González, was longlisted for the International Booker Prize.

Hahn's book on translations of William Shakespeare around the world for Canongate Press, If This Be Magic, was published on 9 April 2026.
