= José Eduardo Agualusa =

Angolan journalist and writer (born 1960)

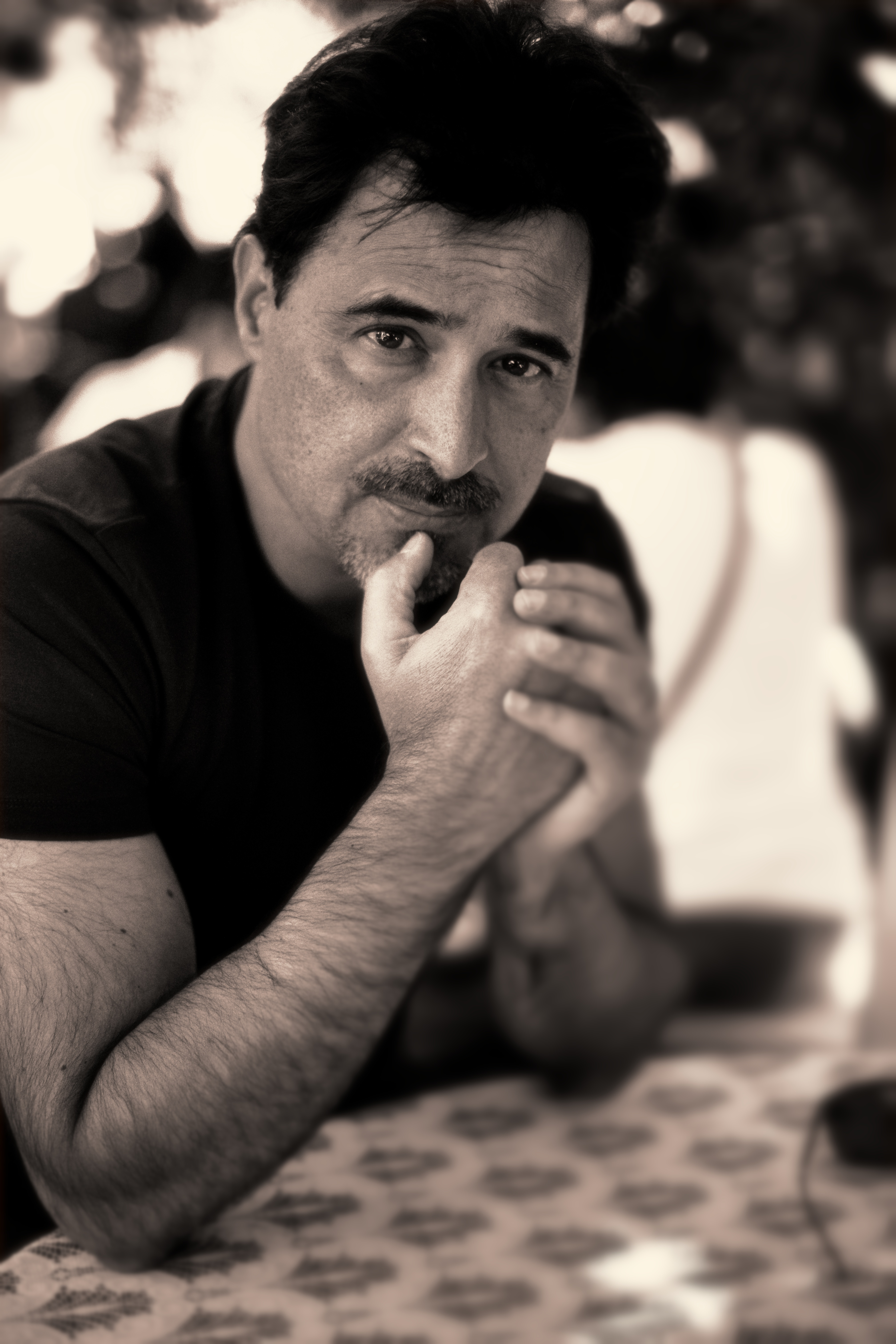
- Born: José Eduardo Agualusa Alves da Cunha; December 13, 1960 (age 65); Nova Lisboa, Overseas Province of Angola
- Writing career
- Language: Portuguese
- Genre: Angolan History
- Notable work: A General Theory of Oblivion
- Notable awards: 2007 Independent Foreign Fiction Prize; 2017 International Dublin Literary Award

José Eduardo Agualusa Alves da Cunha (born December 13, 1960) is an Angolan writer and columnist of Portuguese and Brazilian descent. He studied agronomy and silviculture in Lisbon, Portugal. Currently he resides in the Island of Mozambique, working as a writer and journalist. He also has been working to establish a public library on the island.

== Writing career ==
Agualusa writes predominantly in his native language, Portuguese. His books have been translated into twenty-five languages, most notably into English by translator Daniel Hahn, a frequent collaborator of his. Much of his writing focuses on the history of Angola.

Rainy Season (Estação das Chuvas, 1996) is a biographical novel about Lidia do Carmo Ferreira, the Angolan poet and historian who disappeared mysteriously in Luanda in 1992.

Creole (Nação Crioula, 1997) tells the story of a secret love between the fictional Portuguese adventurer Carlos Fradique Mendes (a creation of the 19th-century Portuguese novelist Eça de Queiroz) and Ana Olímpia de Caminha, a former slave who became one of the wealthiest persons in Angola.

The Book of Chameleons (O Vendedor de Passados, 2004) was excerpted in Gods and Soldiers: The Penguin Anthology of Contemporary African Writing in 2009. The original Portuguese title means "The Seller of Pasts" but Agualusa and Hahn mutually agreed to title it The Book of Chameleons in English—a title that Agualusa liked so much that he repurposed it, in Portuguese, for a subsequent collection of short stories that has not yet been translated: O Livro dos Camaleões.

A General Theory of Oblivion (Teoria Geral do Esquecimento, 2012) tells the history of Angola from the perspective of a woman named Ludo who barricades herself in her Luandan apartment for three decades—beginning the day before the country's independence.

He has seen some success in English-speaking literary circles, most notably for A General Theory of Oblivion. That novel, written in 2012 and translated in 2015, was shortlisted for the 2016 Man Booker International Prize, and was the recipient of the 2017 International Dublin Literary Award.

Agualusa writes monthly for the Portuguese magazine LER and weekly for the Brazilian newspaper O Globo and the Angolan portal Rede Angola. He hosts the radio program A Hora das Cigarras, about African music and poetry, on the channel RDP África. In 2006, he launched, with Conceição Lopes and Fatima Otero, the Brazilian publisher Língua Geral, dedicated exclusively to Portuguese-language authors.

== Criticism and interpretation ==
Agualusa's work has been described as "the lyrical experimentalism and unabashed weirdness of the surrealist". The Portuguese poet Ana Mafalda Leite writes that he sometimes provides "a link between history and fiction, between the account of past events and the description of what might have been possible." She praised his combination of literary style with historical facts.

== Bibliography ==
=== Novels ===
- A Conjura (1989)
- Estação das Chuvas (1996). Rainy Season, trans. Daniel Hahn (2009).
- Nação Crioula (1997). Creole, trans. Daniel Hahn (2002).
- Um estranho em Goa ( 2000)
- O Ano em que Zumbi Tomou o Rio (2003)
- O Vendedor de Passados (2004). The Book of Chameleons, trans. Daniel Hahn (2007).
- As Mulheres de Meu Pai (2007). My Father's Wives, trans. Daniel Hahn (2008).
- Barroco tropical (2009)
- Milagrário Pessoal (2010)
- Teoria Geral do Esquecimento (2012). A General Theory of Oblivion, trans. Daniel Hahn (2015).
- A educação sentimental dos pássaros (2012)
- A Vida no Céu (2013)
- A Rainha Ginga (2014)
- A sociedade dos sonhadores involuntários (2017). The Society of Reluctant Dreamers, trans. Daniel Hahn (2019).
- Os Vivos e os Outros (2020). The Living and the Rest, trans. Daniel Hahn (2023).

=== Short stories and novellas ===
- D. Nicolau Água-Rosada e outras estórias verdadeiras e inverosímeis (short stories, 1990)
- A feira dos assombrados (novella, 1992)
- Fronteiras Perdidas, contos para viajar (short stories, 1999)
- O Homem que Parecia um Domingo (short stories, 2002)
- Catálogo de Sombras (short stories, 2003)
- Manual Prático de Levitação (short stories, 2005). A Practical Guide to Levitation, trans. Daniel Hahn (2023).
- O Livro dos Camaleões (short stories, 2015).

=== Other ===
- O coração dos bosques (poetry, 1991)
- Estranhões e Bizarrocos (juvenile literature, 2000)
- A Substância do Amor e Outras Crónicas (chronicles, 2000)
- Na rota das especiarias (guide, 2008)

He has also published, in collaboration with fellow journalist Fernando Semedo and photographer Elza Rocha, a work of investigative reporting on the African community of Lisbon, entitled Lisboa Africana (1993). Agualusa's play Aquela Mulher was performed by Brazilian actress Marília Gabriela (directed by Antônio Fagundes) in São Paulo, Brazil, in 2008 and Rio de Janeiro, Brazil, in 2009. He co-wrote the play Chovem amores na Rua do Matador with Mozambican writer Mia Couto.

== Awards and honors ==
In June 2017, Agualusa, alongside Daniel Hahn, his translator, was awarded the International Dublin Literary Award for his novel A General Theory of Oblivion. Agualusa's work beat a shortlist of ten titles from around the world, including one written by Irish author Anne Enright, to claim the €100,000 prize. Agualusa was awarded €75,000 personally, as the translator, Daniel Hahn, was entitled to a €25,000 share of the prize money.

Nação Crioula (1997) was awarded the RTP Great Literary Prize. The Book of Chameleons (2006) won the Independent Foreign Fiction Prize in 2007. He is the first African writer to win the award since its inception in 1990.

Agualusa benefited from three literary grants: the first awarded by the Portuguese Centro Nacional de Cultura in 1997 to write Nação Crioula (Creole); the second given in the year 2000 by the Portuguese Fundação Oriente allowing him to visit Goa, India, for three months which resulted in Um estranho em Goa; the third, in 2001, was prestiged by the German Deutscher Akademischer Austauschdienst. Thanks to that grant, he lived one year in Berlin, where he wrote O Ano em que Zumbi Tomou o Rio. In 2009, he was invited by the Dutch Residency for Writers in Amsterdam, where he wrote Barroco Tropical.
