= Loranne Vella =

Maltese writer and translator

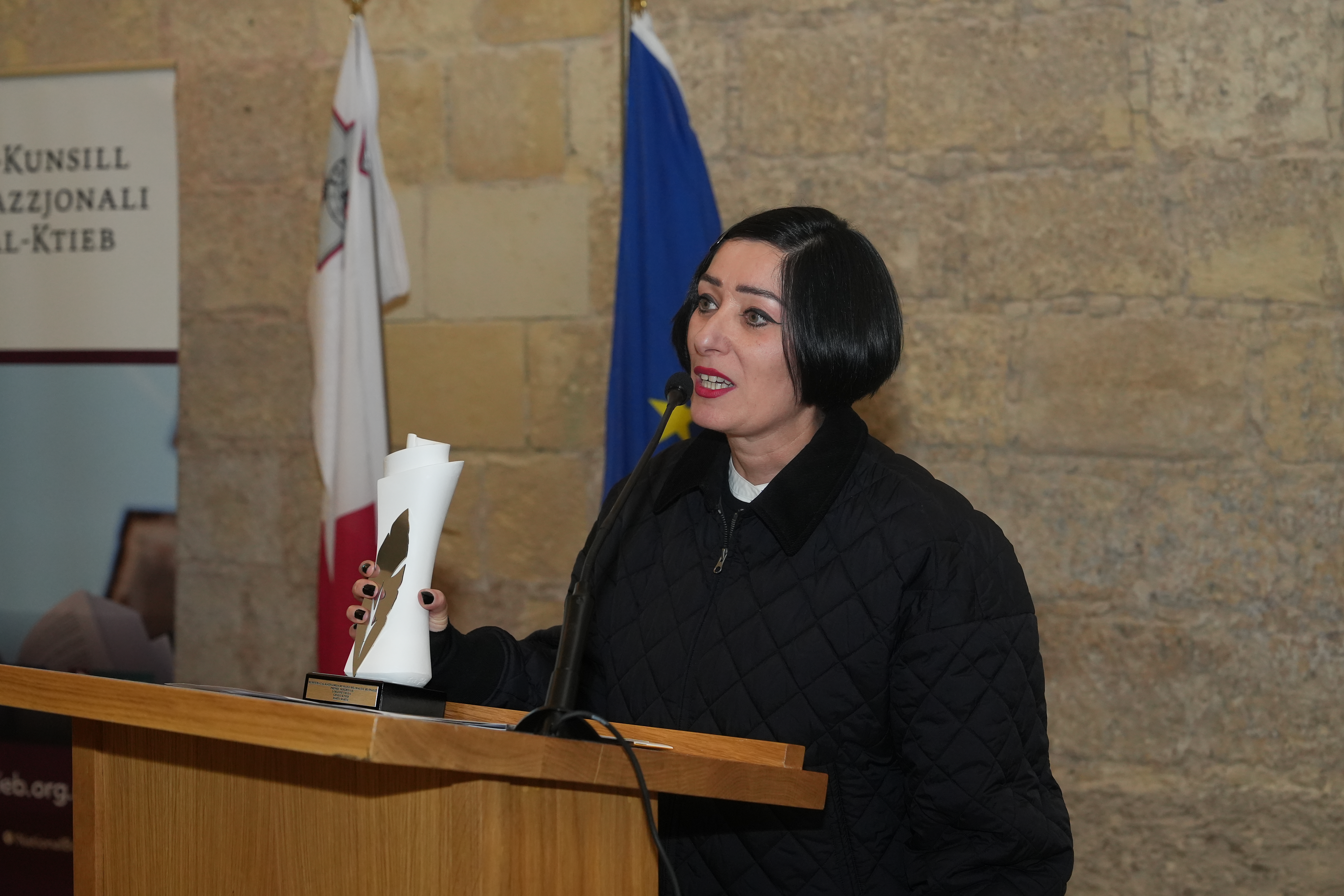
Image of Loranne Vella

Loranne Vella (born 10 July 1972) is a Maltese writer, translator and performer based in Brussels. She has won the Malta National Book Council's National Book Prize several times, including Best Novel in Maltese or English for Rokit (2018) and Marta Marta (2023). She is co-editor of the Maltese-language literary journal Aphroconfuso.

== Biography ==
Loranne Vella was born in Victoria, Gozo, Malta.

She started her professional career as an English and Drama teacher at St. Aloysius College, B'Kara (1995–2005). She left Malta in 2005 and has worked as a translator at the European Parliament, Luxembourg (2005–2008) and at the Economic and Social Committee, Brussels, Belgium (2009–present).

=== Education ===
She attended the following institutions for her Education: Thi Lakin School, Attard (1975–1976), St. Joseph School, B'Bajda (1976–77), St. Joseph School, Paola (1977–1984), Sandhurst School (later known as Sir Adrian Dingli School), Pembroke (Sept-Dec1984), Maria ReginaJunior Lyceum, B'Bajda (1984–88), Ġan Franġisk Abela Sixth Form, Msida (1988–1989), University of Malta, tal-Qroqq – 1989–90, Foundation Course 1990–1991, B.Comm (incomplete) 1991–1995, B.A. Hons in Theatre Studies (Mediterranean Institute) and English as secondary subject 1995–2000, M.A. in Theatre Studies.

=== Personal life ===
Married to: Simon Bartolo (1996–2011).

== Works and Collaborations ==
Artistic Career – Co-founded Aleateia Group Theatre in 1992 with Simon Bartolo, Victor Debono and Russell Muscat, and trained and performed at the Valletta Campus Theatre (then known as MITP Theatre – Mediterranean Institute Theatre Programme) till 2005.The group was formed while all were University Students finding the need to put into practice the various theories and disciplines encountered in their studies as well as discover their own methodology of work and discipline. In 2013 she collaborated with photographer Ritty Tacsum in her 4 Rooms exhibition. This was the first time Vella combined literature, photography and performance in one event, an exercise which was repeated in the subsequent book launches (Rokit – 2017, Mill-bieb 'il ġewwa – 2019). It is also the fundamental principal behind the performance art collective which she co-founded with Sephora Gauci in 2017, Barumbara Collective – to create performative events in collaboration with artists from other art forms.

Between 2014 and 2017 she translated several children's stories from French into Maltese (known as Rumanzini) and one from Spanish into Maltese, Vjoletta, which won the Terramaxka Book Prize 2016. In 2019 she collaborated with artist Trevor Borg and wrote a story for children inspired by his work presented at the Venice Biennale as part of the Maltese Pavilion. The title of the story is Smajna Isimna Taħt l-Art, published in November 2019.

In 2017 her novel Rokit was published by Merlin Publishers. The novel won Malta's National Book Prize for Best Novel in Maltese or English the following year. In 2024, with translator Kat Storace, it won an English PEN Translates award.

Her short-story collection mill-bieb 'il ġewwa was shortlisted for the National Book Prize in 2020. An English-language translation, what will it take for me to leave, by Kat Storace was published by Praspar Press in 2021. This translation was shortlisted for the Society of Authors TA First Translation Prize 2022.

In 2022, her novel Marta Marta was published by EDE Books. It won the National Book Prize for Best Novel in Maltese or English the following year. An extract from this novel, translated by Kat Storace, appears in The White Review's Writing in Translation Anthology (2024).

In 2023, together with Joe Gatt, she launched the Maltese-language journal Aphroconfuso.
