= Judith Schalansky =

German writer, book designer and publisher (born 1980)

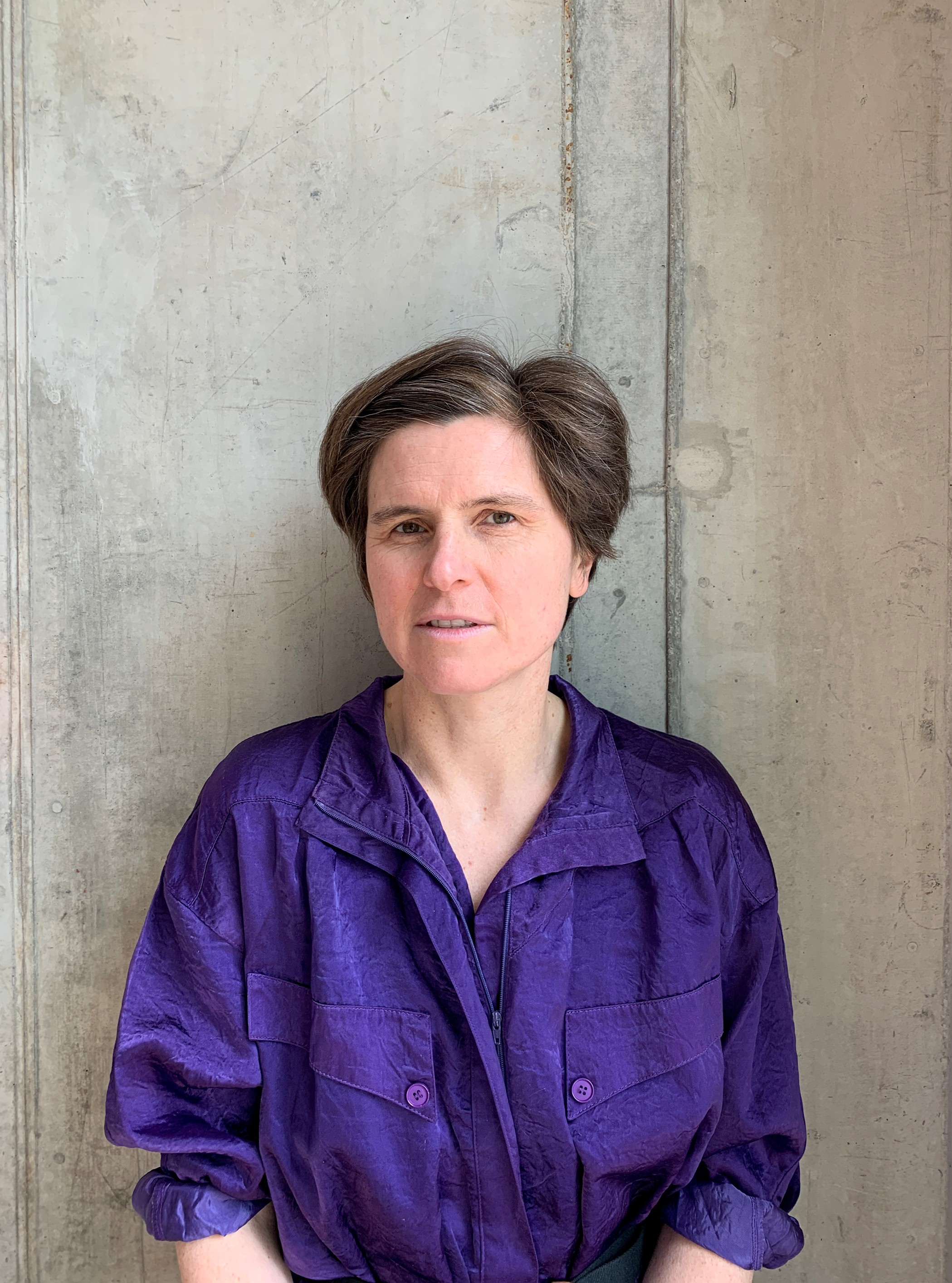
- Born: 20 September 1980 (age 45); Greifswald, East Germany
- Occupations: writer, book designer, publisher

Judith Schalansky (born 20 September 1980) is a German writer, book designer and publisher.

== Work ==
Her book Atlas of Remote Islands won first prize in the Stiftung Buchkunst's "The Most Beautiful German Books" competition (German: Die schönsten deutschen Bücher) in 2009. In 2012, she won the same prize for The Giraffe’s Neck. Schalansky has degrees in both art history and communication design. Since 2013, she has been the general editor of the Naturkunden series, published by Matthes & Seitz.

== Personal life ==
Schalansky was born in Greifswald. She lives in Berlin with her partner, actress Bettina Hoppe.

The asteroid 95247 Schalansky was named after her in 2011.

== Bibliography ==
- Schalansky, Judith (2008). Fraktur mon Amour (in German). Mainz: Schmidt. ISBN 978-3-87439-748-3. OCLC 263451085.
- —— (2008). Blau steht dir nicht : Matrosenroman [Blue Doesn't Suit You] (in German). Hamburg: Marebuchverlag. ISBN 978-3-86648-078-0. OCLC 231681041.
- —— (2010). Atlas der abgelegenen Inseln fünfzig Inseln, auf denen ich nie war und niemals sein werde (in German). Frankfurt, M: Buchbinderei Schaumann. ISBN 978-3-7632-6315-8. OCLC 612336879.
- —— (2011). Der Hals der Giraffe Bildungsroman (in German). Berlin: Suhrkamp Verlag. ISBN 978-3-518-42177-2. OCLC 740919918.
- —— (2018). Verzeichnis einiger Verluste (in German). Berlin: Suhrkamp Verlag. ISBN 978-3-518-42824-5. OCLC 1031774618.
- —— (2026). Marmor, Quecksilber, Nebel. Woraus die Welt gemacht ist (in German). Berlin: Suhrkamp Verlag. ISBN 978-3-518-42824-5. OCLC 1031774618.

=== English translations ===
- Schalansky, Judith (2008). Fraktur mon amour (in German). New York: Princeton Architectural Press. ISBN 978-1-56898-801-6. OCLC 227018408.
- ——; Lo, Christine (2010). Atlas of Remote Islands : fifty islands I have never set foot on and never will. New York. ISBN 978-0-14-311820-6. OCLC 515457193.
- ——; Whiteside, Shaun (2014). The giraffe's neck : a novel. New York. ISBN 978-1-62040-338-9. OCLC 849210969.
- ——; Smith, Jackie (2020). An Inventory of Losses. New York. ISBN 978-0-8112-2963-0. OCLC 1122913021.

== Awards and honors ==
- 2007: Silbermedaille des Art Directors Club Deutschland for Fraktur mon Amour
- 2007: Type Directors Club's Award for Typographic Excellence for Fraktur mon Amour
- 2009: First Prize, Stiftung Buchkunst's "The Most Beautiful German Books" for Atlas der abgelegenen Inseln
- 2012: First Prize, Stiftung Buchkunst's "The Most Beautiful German Books" for Der Hals der Giraffe
- 2014: Preis der Literaturhäuser
- 2014: Mainzer Stadtschreiberin
- 2015: Droste Prize
- 2018: Wilhelm Raabe Literature Prize for Verzeichnis einiger Verluste
- 2020: Christine Lavant Preis
- 2020: Nicolas Born Prize
- 2021: Warwick Prize for Women in Translation
- 2021: Gutenberg Prize of the City of Leipzig
- 2022: Carl-Amery-Literaturpreis
- 2024: Royal Society of Literature International Writer
- 2025: Lessing Prize of the Free and Hanseatic City of Hamburg
