= Mackenzie Davis =

Canadian actress (born 1987)

- Davis in 2026
- Born: Mackenzie Rio Davis; April 1, 1987 (age 39); Vancouver, British Columbia, Canada
- Education: McGill University; Neighborhood Playhouse School of the Theatre
- Occupations: Actress; Producer; Director
- Years active: 2011–present

Mackenzie Rio Davis (born April 1, 1987) is a Canadian actress. She made her feature film debut in the drama film Smashed (2012). In 2013, she appeared in the film The F Word, for which she received a Canadian Screen Award nomination for Best Supporting Actress. From 2014 to 2017, she starred as computer programmer Cameron Howe in the AMC period drama series Halt and Catch Fire.

Davis starred in the two-time Emmy award winning Black Mirror episode "San Junipero" in 2016, for which she received critical acclaim. She appeared in the films The Martian (2015), Blade Runner 2049 (2017), and portrayed the title character in the comedy-drama film Tully (2018). She then starred as an augmented super-soldier in Terminator: Dark Fate (2019), and co-starred in the romantic comedy film Happiest Season (2020). In 2021, she had a lead role in the miniseries Station Eleven, which earned her a Critics' Choice Super Award.

== Early life ==
Davis was born in Vancouver, British Columbia, to Lotte, a graphic designer, and John Davis, a hairdresser from Liverpool, England. Her parents own AG Hair. She graduated from Collingwood School in West Vancouver in 2005 and then attended McGill University in Montreal, Quebec. She went on to study acting at the Neighborhood Playhouse in New York City.

== Career ==
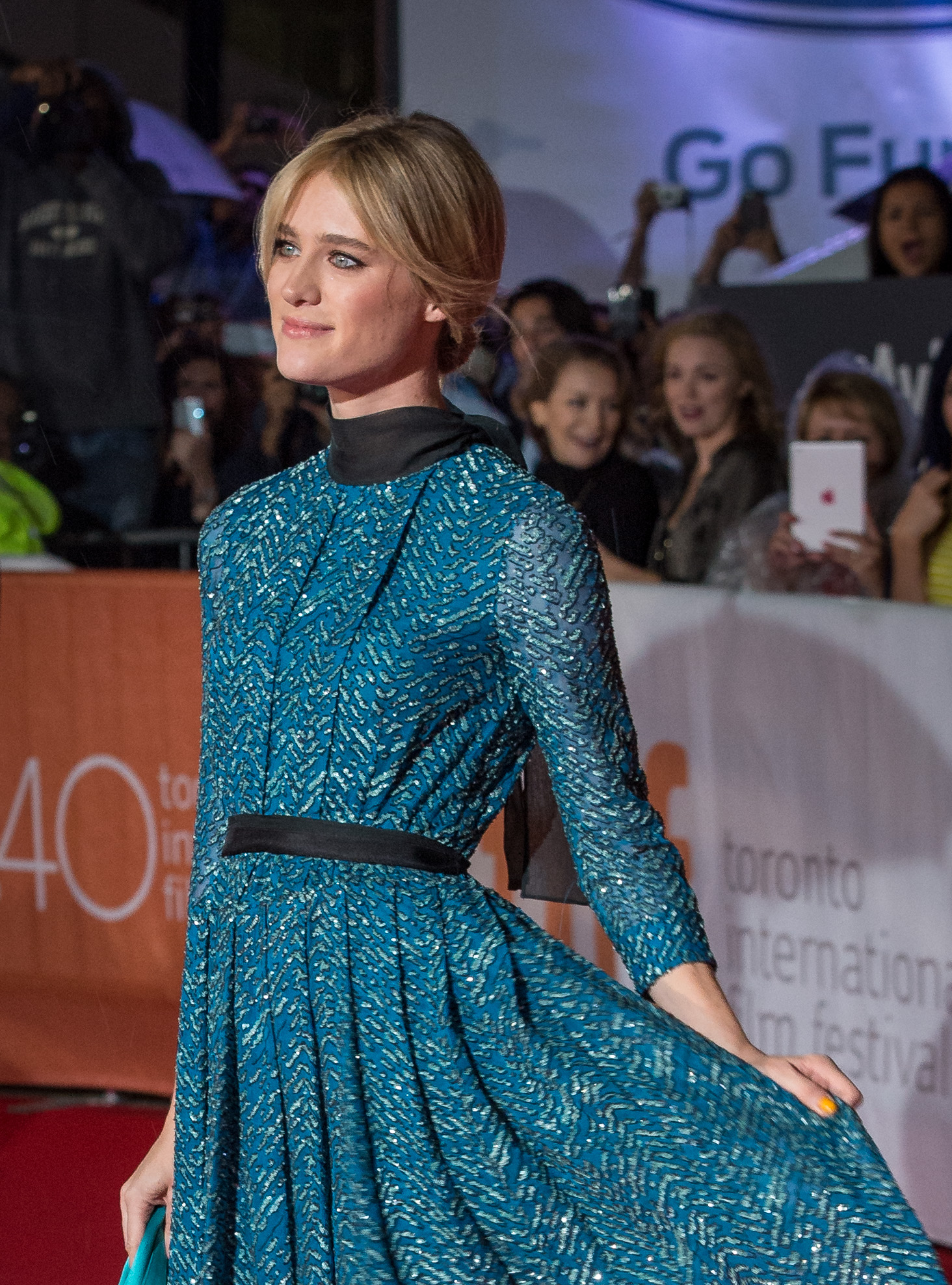
Davis at TIFF 2015

Davis's first feature film was Smashed. In 2015, she appeared in The Martian as NASA satellite communications engineer Mindy Park.

From 2014 to 2017, she played programming prodigy Cameron Howe in Halt and Catch Fire for the duration of its four-season run.

In 2016, she co-starred as Yorkie in "San Junipero", an episode of the anthology series Black Mirror, which received two Emmy Awards. She was also cast as Mariette in Blade Runner 2049.

In 2019, she appeared in Terminator: Dark Fate as an augmented super soldier who is sent from the future to protect Dani Ramos. In October 2019, she was cast in the lead role in the HBO Max miniseries Station Eleven.

In 2020, Davis starred as Kate in The Turning, opposite Finn Wolfhard and Brooklynn Prince. The film is a modern adaptation of the 1898 horror novella The Turn of the Screw by Henry James. She also starred as Diana Hastings in Irresistible, a film by Jon Stewart about the outsized influence of money on the American electoral system. She also starred in the 2020 romantic comedy Happiest Season co-starring Kristen Stewart.

In June 2020, it was announced that Davis would be part of the ensemble cast of Zellner Brothers' science-fiction comedy Alpha Gang, which includes Jon Hamm, Andrea Riseborough, Nicholas Hoult, Sofia Boutella and Steven Yeun.

In February to April 2023 she played the role of Isolde in Phaedra in an updated version of the play by Simon Stone at the National Theatre in London.

Her short film WOACA, her directorial debut, screened in the Short Cuts program at the 2023 Toronto International Film Festival.

In May 2022, she signed to star in Justin Anderson’s directorial debut Swimming Home, an adaptation of the Booker Prize-nominated novel of the same name by Deborah Levy, alongside Christopher Abbott and Ariane Labed.

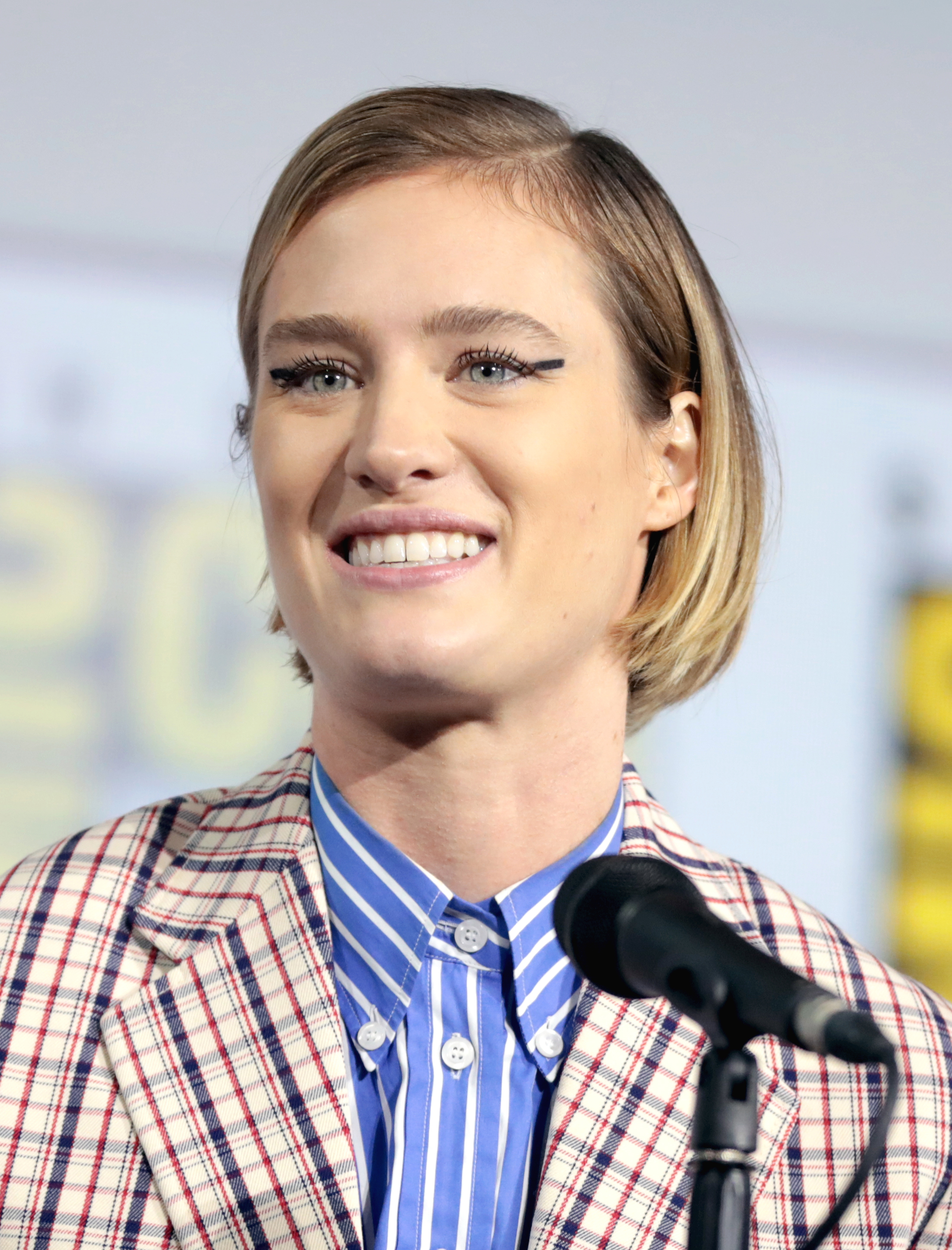
Davis in 2019

== Filmography ==
Key
†	Denotes works that have not yet been released

=== Film ===
Year	Title	Role	Notes
2011	Alex	Terri	Short film
2012	Smashed	Millie	
2012	The Hat Goes Wild	Cathy	Credited as Mackenzie Rio Davis
2013	Breathe In	Lauren Reynolds	
2013	The F Word	Nicole	Alternative title: What If?
2013	Bad Turn Worse	Sue	
2013	Plato's Reality Machine	Sophia	
2013	Moontown	Shayna	Short film
2014	That Awkward Moment	Chelsea	
2014	Emptied	Charlotte Laurence	Short film
2015	Freaks of Nature	Petra Lane	
2015	A Country Called Home	Reno	
2015	Memory Box	Isabelle	Short film
2015	The Martian	Mindy Park	
2016	Always Shine	Anna	
2017	Izzy Gets the F*ck Across Town	Izzy	Also producer
2017	Blade Runner 2049	Mariette	
2018	Boomerang	Jenifer	Short film
2018	Tully	Tully	
2019	Terminator: Dark Fate	Grace Harper	
2020	The Turning	Kate Mandell	
2020	Irresistible	Diana Hastings	
2020	Happiest Season	Harper Caldwell	
2023	WOACA		Short film; writer, director, producer
2024	Swimming Home	Isabel	
2024	Speak No Evil	Louise Dalton	
2026	My Notes on Mars	Margot	

=== Television ===
Year	Title	Role	Notes
2012	I Just Want My Pants Back	Lucie	Episode: "Safety Nets"
2014–2017	Halt and Catch Fire	Cameron Howe	Main role (40 episodes)
2016	Black Mirror	Yorkie	Episode: "San Junipero"
2017	No Activity	Patricia / "Pat the Rat"	Episode: "The Witness"
2020	Home Movie: The Princess Bride	Princess Buttercup	Episode: "Chapter Two: The Shrieking Eels"
2021–2022	Station Eleven	Kirsten Raymonde	Main role (10 episodes)
2022	Love, Death & Robots	Martha Kivelson (voice)	Episode: "The Very Pulse of the Machine"
2026	Below	Fonda Howander	Main role (miniseries)
2027	The Twin †	Nicola	Main role (miniseries)
2028	Mister Miracle †	Big Barda (voice)	Main role

=== Theatre ===
Year	Title	Role	Notes
2023	Phaedra	Isolde	National Theatre, London

== Accolades ==
Year	Award	Category	Nominated work	Result
2014	Canadian Screen Awards	Best Performance by an Actress in a Supporting Role	The F Word	Nominated
2016	Monster Fest	Best Performance in a Feature Film (Female)	Always Shine	Won
2016	Tribeca Film Festival	Best Actress in a U.S. Narrative Feature	Always Shine	Won
2017	Napa Valley Film Festival	Special Jury Award – Best Breakout Performance	Izzy Gets the F*ck Across Town	Won
2017	Tacoma Film Festival	Best Performance (shared with Jun Zhao)	Izzy Gets the F*ck Across Town	Won
2017	International Online Cinema Awards	Best Supporting Actress in a Limited Series or TV Movie	"San Junipero"	Nominated
2018	International Online Cinema Awards	Best Supporting Actress	Tully	Nominated
2018	Indiana Film Journalists Association	Best Supporting Actress	Tully	Nominated
2019	Women's Image Network Awards	Supporting Actress Feature Film	Tully	Nominated
2019	CinemaCon	Ensemble Award (shared with Linda Hamilton, Natalia Reyes and Gabriel Luna)	Terminator: Dark Fate	Won
2022	Critics' Choice Super Awards	Best Actress in a Science Fiction/Fantasy Series	Station Eleven	Won
