= Hot Milk =

Hot Milk may refer to:

- Hot Milk (band), a British rock band
- Hot Milk (novel), a 2016 novel by Deborah Levy
  - Hot Milk (film), a 2025 film based on the novel
- Hot Milk, a 2021 album by Sukima Switch
