= Swimming Home (disambiguation) =

Swimming Home is a novel by Deborah Levy

Swimming Home may also refer to:

- Swimming Home (film), the film adaptation of the novel
- "Swimming Home", a song by Evanescence from Evanescence
