= Here After (2024 film) =

- American theatrical release poster
- Directed by: Robert Salerno
- Written by: Sarah Conradt
- Produced by: Sukee Chew; Naomi Despres; Riccardo Di Pasquale; Robert Salerno; Christopher Tricarico
- Starring: Connie Britton; Freya Hannan-Mills; Giovanni Cirfiera; Tommaso Basili; Alessandro Riceci; Andrea Bruschi; Babetida Sadjo; Syama Rayner; Carlotta Proietti; Alessandro Bressanello; Lollo Franco
- Cinematography: Bartosz Nalazek
- Edited by: John F. Lyons
- Music by: Fabrizio Mancinelli
- Production companies: Claro; Fenix Entertainment; Artina Films; Hopscotch Pictures
- Distributed by: Eagle Pictures (Italy); Paramount Pictures (select international territories)
- Release dates: 25 July 2024 (Italy); 13 September 2024 (United States)
- Running time: 93 minutes
- Countries: Italy; United States
- Languages: English; Italian
- Box office: $16,505

Here After is a 2024 supernatural horror drama film directed and produced by Robert Salerno. The film follows Claire, who notices changes in her daughter after she is revived following a fatal accident.

The film was released in Italy on 25 July 2024 and in the United States on 13 September 2024.

== Synopsis ==
Claire is overjoyed when her daughter Robin is miraculously revived following an accident that would have otherwise proven fatal. However, her relief turns to dread as Claire notices changes in her daughter and suspects that something dark has followed her back from the brink of death.

== Cast ==
- Connie Britton as Claire Hiller
- Freya Hannan-Mills as Robin Hiller
- Giovanni Cirfiera as Luca
- Tommaso Basili as Dr. Ben Romano
- Alessandro Riceci as Sagravas
- Andrea Bruschi as Dr. Stancik
- Babetida Sadjo as Viv
- Syama Rayner as Adriana
- Carlotta Proietti as Angie
- Alessandro Bressanello as Father Sergio
- Lollo Franco as Renato

== Release ==
Here After was first released in Italy on 25 July 2024, and was also released in the United States in select theaters and on digital on 13 September 2024.

== Reception ==
Dennis Harvey of Variety wrote: "Too mild in its suspense and too pat in its soapy emphasis on maternal suffering". Christy Lemire of RogerEbert.com wrote: "This sluggish tale of remorse and forgiveness mostly remains bland and distant, like the many generic aerial shots of Rome that it offers".
