= Hyppönen =

Hyppönen is a Finnish-language surname that may refer to:

- Janne Hyppönen (born 1970), Finnish football manager and footballer
- Laura Hyppönen, Finnish filmmaker
- Mikko Hyppönen (born 1969), Finnish computer security expert and columnist
