= ASVOFF =

Film festival that began in 2008

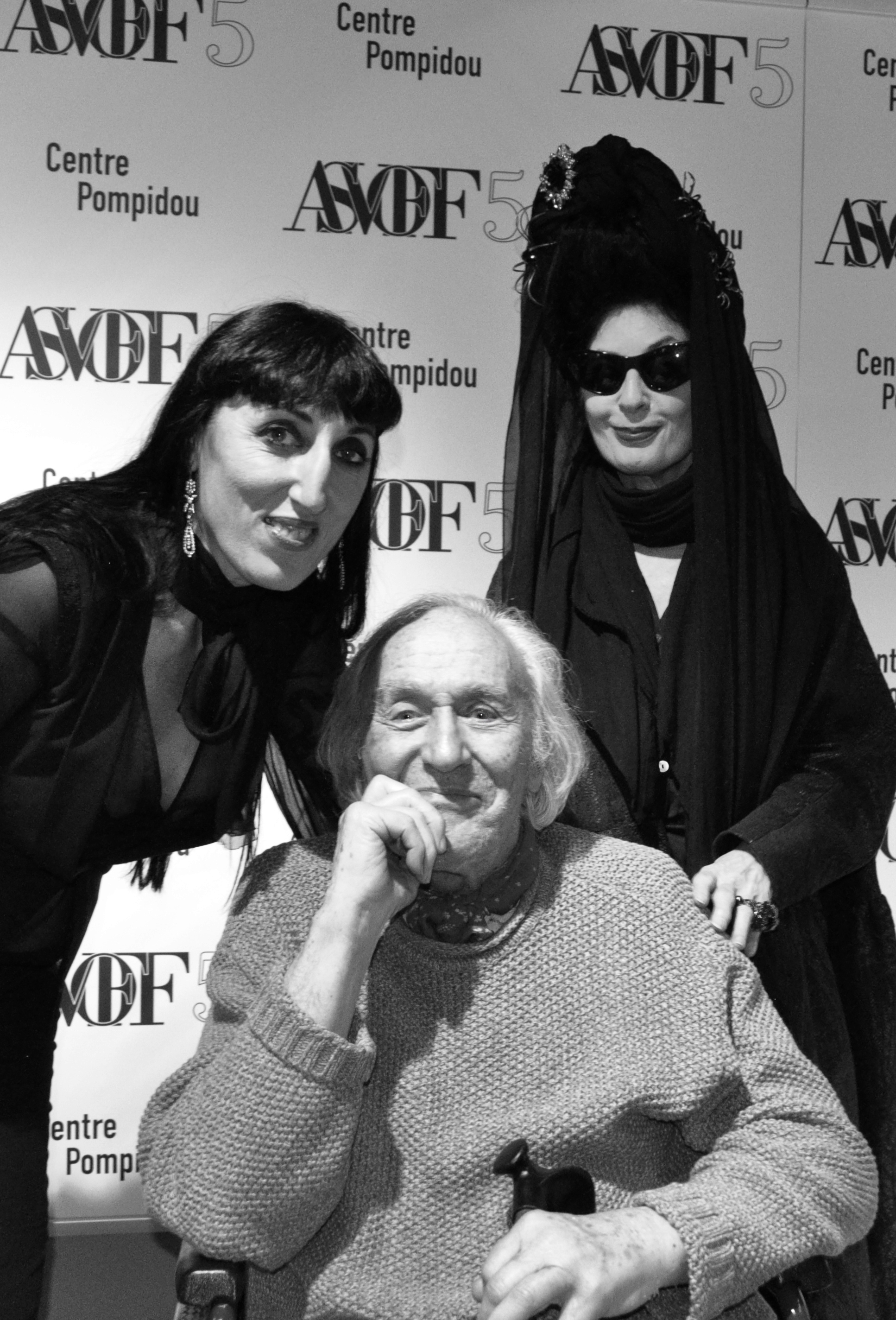
- photographer William Klein, actress Rossy de Palma and festival founder Diane Pernet at ASVOFF 5, 2012
- Founded: September 2008
- Founded by: Diane Pernet
- Website: www.ashadedviewonfashionfilm.com

ASVOFF, or A Shaded View on Fashion Film, is a fashion film festival founded by journalist Diane Pernet. Since its 2008 debut at the Jeu de Paume National Gallery, it is a three-day festival event showcasing feature films, documentaries, conferences, performances and installations.

The festival's main venue, save for one year where it was hosted in Nu Boyana Film Studios, is Paris, but since its beginnings, it participates in fashion movements and events the world over, hosted by institutions such as the Bilbao Guggenheim museum, Milan's Palazzo Morando, and the New York Scope art fair. It has also had sponsorship from those such as Italian Vogue, Bulgari, Kering and Dom Perignon.

== Founder ==
Diane Pernet earned her first degree in documentary filmmaking at Temple University. Prior to founding ASVOFF, she worked as a costume designer for directors including Amos Gitai.

== History ==
Mark Eley of Eley Kishimoto commissioned her to make a road movie for the launch of his new menswear line.

In November 2007 Diane Pernet also co-curated the NOOVO fashion and photography festival in Santiago de Compostela. "You Wear It Well" was dissolved in 2007 when Pernet with the support of her current producer, David Herman, took the festival from a one-day program to a three-day program and to make it an extension of the ASVOF blog, hence the name ASVOFF (A Shaded View on Fashion Film). In September 2008, ASVOFF was launched in Paris at Jeu de Paume.

== ASVOFF venues ==
ASVOFF festival venues (click to enlarge)

Besides its annual festival in Paris in September, ASVOFF has other projects around the world.

Other places on the ASVOFF list:

Main venues

- 2008 – Paris, premiere at the Jeu de Paume museum
- 2009 – Paris Passage du Désir, Awards ceremony at the Centre Georges Pompidou
- 2010–2011 – Paris Centre Georges Pompidou, Passage du Désir
- 2012–2015 – Paris Centre Georges Pompidou
- 2016–2017 – Cannes la Croisette
- 2018 – Paris Club de l'Etoile

Satellite venues

- 2008 – Bilbao at the Guggenheim Museum
- 2008 – Riga, with Moments
- 2009 – London at the Chelsea Arts Club
- 2009 – Amsterdam, with MASS
- 2010 – Milan at the Palazzo Morando with Vogue Italia
- 2010 – Hyères International Festival of Fashion and Photography,
- 2010 – London at the Barbican Art Gallery
- 2010 – Kyiv, with Elle Ukraine
- 2010 – Seoul, Daily Projects
- 2010 – Cluj-Napoca, with Transylvania National Theatre
- 2010 – Moscow, Russian Fashion Week
- 2010 – Milan at the Cine Opera at Corso Como, with films by Michael Nyman
- 2011 – Miami, with Art Basel
- 2011 – Tbilisi, Georgian Fashion Week
- 2012 – Venice, Circuito-Off, Venice International Short Film Festival
- 2012 – Minsk, Belarus Fashion Week
- 2012 – Vienna, with Frame 0ut, Museum Quarter
- 2012 – Barcelona, with CaixaForum
- 2013 – Athens, with Fashion Workshop by Vicky Kaya Fashion on Screen
- 2013 – Munich, with ABSOLUTE Creatives
- 2013 – Tokyo at Cinema Rise X in Tokyo
- 2013 – Cannes at the Cannes Film Festival croisette's Villa Schweppes
- 2013 – Saint Petersburg Aurora Fashion Week
- 2013 – Montreal, Festival du Nouveau Cinema
- 2013 – Arnhem, Arnhem Biennale
- 2013 – Vladivostok, with the Ministry of Culture of Russia and Aurora Fashion Week
- 2013 – Paris, la Gaîté lyrique
- 2014 – New York Scope Art Fair in New York, with films by Michael Nyman
- 2014 – Copenhagen, with CPH DOX
- 2014 – Łódź, LODZ Fashion Philosophy Week
- 2014 – Antwerp, with MoMu at MUSE
- 2014 – Mexico City, with Trendsétera, Museo Franz Mayer
- 2014 – Paris, in collaboration with Champs-Élysées Film Festival
- 2014 – Rome, with AltaRoma
- 2015 – Chicago at the Gene Siskel Film Center
- 2016 – Boston at the Museum of Fine Arts
- 2016 – Shanghai at the China Academy of Art, Shanghai Institute of Design, the West Bund Art Center, the Power Station of Art, and the Shanghai Himalayas Museum
- 2017 – Sofia, Nuboyana Film Studios
- 2017 – Paris, Palais Brongniart
- 2018 – Rome, Palazzo Altemps
- 2019 – Bratislava, Bratislava Film Festival

== Editions ==
=== 2008 === ASVOFF 1 was held at the Galerie nationale du Jeu de Paume
Jury list	Prize categories
Danièle Hibon: president of the jury: director of the Cinema Department of Le Jeu de Paume. Previously supervised Le Bureau d'Accompagnement de l'Avance sur Recettes at the Centre National de la Cinématographie. Since 1995 she has been organizing cinematic workshops for art-school students; Magali Aubert: she founded Standard magazine in 2003. Her role as editor-in-chief of the magazine makes every artistic field her forte.; Hélène Segol: music video producer at Wanda, one of the top ad and music video production companies in the world.; Laurent Goumarre: producer of the radio-show Minuit Dix.; Eric Tong Cuong: co-founder of advertising mega-agency BETC, co-founder of enduring music label Naïve, Eric is now running his latest adventure – the pluridisciplinary advertising agency La Chose.	ASVOFF Grand Prize: Jenny Haniver by Camille Vivier; Special mention: Video Look Book by Jeremy Scott; Public Prize winner of the first edition of A Shaded View on Fashion Film at Jeu de Paume was "The Pattern Film" by Anemone Skjoldager
Satellite Venues
Bilbao at the Guggenheim Museum; Riga, with Moments

=== 2009 === ASVOFF 2, under jury president Rick Owens, was held at the Passage du Désir/BETC, Paris followed by an awards ceremony held at the nearby Centre Georges Pompidou. Due to the growing size of the selection, it was separated in two sections: Reflection (directors vision of fashion), and Communication (communication of one brand/designer).
Jury list	Prize categories
Rick Owens President: Eric Tong Cuong; Laurent Gaumarre; Nan Goldin; Maria de Mederios; Helene Segol	On 8 October, the jury headed by Rick Owens handed out awards for the ASVOFF 2009 Fashion Film competition: Public Prize: "Herr Rodebjer Part I" by Mattias Montero for Rodebjer; DailyMotion Winner: "HLH: Autumn Winter 2509 BC" by Claire Kurylowski and Jason Bradbury for Harald Lunde Helgesen; Jury Prize, Reflection Section: "Fiction Noir" by Steven Klein, starring Lara Stone; Jury Prize, Communication Section: "Gareth Pugh AW09" by Ruth Hogben for Gareth Pugh; Jury Prize, Communication Section: "Matthew Williamson" by Johan Renck for H&M; Grand Prix Samsung: "I Wanna Be Your Dog" by Georgie Greville
Satellite Venues
London at the Chelsea Arts Club; Amsterdam, with MASS

=== 2010 === ASVOFF 3, under Jury president Olivier Saillard, was held at Paris' Centre Georges Pompidou on 24, 25 and 26 September, with running installations of the festival's competition films held at the BETC's Passage du Desir from 25 to 28 September. For this edition Diane Pernet worked together with the young fashion blogger Tavi Gevinson.
Jury list	Prize categories
Olivier Saillard, fashion historian and director of the Musee Galliera, ASVOFF president; Mike Figgis, Academy Award-nominated writer/director; films include Leaving Las Vegas and Timecode; Elisabeth Quin, film critic and a French government representative for fashion; Michael Nyman, film composer for The Piano and 12 Peter Greenaway films; Bryan Adams, photographer and musician; Dita Von Teese, performer and style icon; Fabrice Brovelli, TV production director, BETC EuroRSCG.; Paolo Roversi, photographer; Emmanuelle Castro, film acquisitions and co-production director, Wild Bunch; Daphne Burki, reporter for Canal + television; Nadja Romain, independent producer; Sara Maino, senior fashion editor, Vogue Italia; Zowie Broach, designer of Boudicca; Abdel Bounane, chief editor, Amusement magazine; Olivier Seguret, journalist Liberation	Best Film: "Lust Lust" by Martins Grauds; Best Artistic Director: Alex Prager for "Despair (Nowness)"; Special Jury Prize: "Lights" by Yoann Lemoine with Shaun Ross; Best New Talent, Samsung: "Blacklight" by Suzie Q + Leo Siboni; Beauty Prize – Shu Uemura: "How You Look at It" by Poppy de Villeneuve (NOWNESS); Best Sound: "CHAPTER 14 The Dream of the Disembodied Birds" by Andrea Splisgar; Best Acting: Lauren McAvoy in "Chore Damaris" by Justin Anderson; Le Book Prize: AnOther Magazine – "Nocturna" by Daniel Askill
Satellite Venues
Milan at the Palazzo Morando in January 2010 featuring 7 hours of fashion films screening and a special installation: "LIGHT SERIES", a series of 1-minute films commissioned by Diane Pernet and co-curator Antoine Asseraf, in addition to a special contest with Vogue Italia, won by Miho Kinamura and Zaiba Jabbar. The collaboration was suggested by Frederico Poletti who proposed the idea to Vogue Italia editor Franca Sozzani. They found it interesting to make a complementary online event with the launch of Vogue.it. A selection of the films in the LIGHT series includes: Blacklight by Suzie Q and Leo Siboni, Lights by Yoann Lemoine, Short Circuit in the After Hour by Andrea Splisgar, Sunshowers by Elisa Smith-Leverock in collaboration with jewellery designer Fred Butler, Untitled by Sofia Sanchez and Mauro Mongiello and Spectre by Antoine Asseraf and René Habermacher.; New York Art Fair: a curating a fashion/art exhibition and an ASVOFF film program.; London at the Barbican Art Gallery; Kyiv, with Elle Ukraine; Seoul, Daily Projects; Cluj, with Transylvania National Theatre; Moscow, Russian Fashion Week; Milan at the Cine Opera at Corso Como, with films by Michael Nyman

=== 2011 === ASVOFF 4, under jury president Elisabeth Quin, was held at the Centre Georges Pompidou in Paris.
Jury list	Prize categories
Elisabeth Quin, film critic and journalist (Paris Première, France Inter, et al.) / ASVOFF 4 Jury President; Rossy de Palma, actress / ASVOFF ambassador; Elisha Karmitz, multimedia director of MK2; Olivier Saillard, director of Musée Galliera; Manish Arora, fashion designer / creative director of Paco Rabanne; Daphne Guinness, film producer; Jerry Stafford, creative director, Première Heure; Pascale Faure, head of the Short-film Department, Canal+; Sam Shahid, creative director (including for books on Bruce Weber, Herb Ritts, Ellen Von Unwerth, et al.); Raphaëlle Stopin, creative director, responsible for the photography section, Festival d'Hyeres; Colette Barbier, director of the Fondation d'entreprise Ricard; Rebecca Blake, photographer / director; Thérèse Deprez, production designer (for films including Black Swan); Alice Pfeiffer, journalist (International Herald Tribune, Le Figaro, The New York Times, et al.); Philippe Azoury, journalist at Libération; Philippe Brutus, executive vice president of Photography, Art + Commerce; Joseph Ghosn, editor-in-chief, Condé Nast Digital for Vogue.fr, GQmagazine.fr and Glamourparis.com; Christian Ravera and Guy Guglieri, founders of Mixte magazine; Chris Miller, co-president, Flower Films; Leonardo Girombelli, branding and communication manager, thecorner.com	ASVOFF Grand Prix, MK2: "I Want Muscle" by Elisha Smith-Leverock; Best Artistic Direction Prize: Lernert & Sander for "The Fantastic Man Series"; Best Soundtrack Prize: "Praise Break" (Director's cut, 2011) by Eric Weidt for Pop Magazine; Best Actor Prize: Danny Trejo in "Onions Don't Make Me Cry" by Bryan Adams; Best Styling Prize: "Twin Parallel" by Justin Anderson; Beauty Prize – Shu Uemura: "Waters" by Kira Lillie; Young Talent Prize – Portal+Zekka: "Is This Real Life" (Nuptialis Project) by Suzie Q + Leo Siboni; Special Animation Prize: "Exercise in Sartorial Deprivation" by Davide Bedoni; TheCorner.com's Award: "Scalpel/Stradivarius" by Jason Last and Jaime Rubiano
Satellite Venues
Miami, with Art Basel; Tbilisi, during Georgian Fashion Week; Perth Institute of Contemporary Arts (PICA), Australia

=== 2012 === ASVOFF 5, under jury president Orlan, was held at the Centre Georges Pompidou in Paris.
Jury list	Prize categories
Jury president: ORLAN, artist; Dominique Issermann, photographer; Tim Blanks, Style.com, editor-at-large; Fabrice Rebois, co-director of Arte television network; Elisha Karmitz, multimedia director of MK2; Colin McDowell, fashion writer and author; Marian Masone, associate director of programming, The Film Society of Lincoln Center; Maria Luisa Poumaillou, fashion buyer, Maria Luisa in Printemps; Marc Audibet, fashion designer; Joseph Ghosn, Obsession magazine, editor-in-chief; Clément Ghys, journalist; Philippe Cohen Solal (aska Gotan Project), musician; Emmanuel Asmar, entertainment lawyer; Michel Gaubert, sound designer and DJ; Rain Li, director; Emanuel Levy, film critic and author of nine books on film	Grand Prix ASVOFF Barcelona for Best Film – "Ephemeral Nature" by Gsus Lopez; ASVOFF Grand Prix ASVOFF 5 Awarded by MK2 – "Headpieces For Peace" by Jessica Mitrani; Best Artistic Direction Prize: "Hors d'Oeuvre by Monica Menez"; Best Acting Prix: A Private Label Conversation with Brett Guitar Hofer, Talent Scout (for Haans Nicholas Mott) by Haans Nicholas Mott, Actor: Brett Guitar Hofer; Best Sound: Visiting Hour for SHOWstudio by Marie Schuller; Best Styling: UNIFORM (for Eckhaus Latta) by Alexa Karolinski; Best Documentary Awarded by Portal +: To Be Honest by Jason Last; Beauty Prize Awarded by Make Up Forever: A Mon Seul Desir by ioulex and Mogollon Make-Up artist Roberto Morelli; Best Advertising prize (Two Awarded Films: Watermarked (for Kenzo) by DIS and Morphe (for Aesop) by Lucy McRae; Emerging Talent Prize Awarded by NOWFASHION: DANNY (for the band Kenji Minogue with the collection of Tom Van der Borght) by Goran Grahovac
Satellite Venues
Venice, Circuito-Off, Venice International Short Film Festival; Minsk, Belarus Fashion Week; Vienna, with Frame 0ut, Museum Quarter; Barcelona, with CaixaForum

=== 2013 === ASVOFF 6, under jury president Michèle Lamy, was held at the Centre Georges Pompidou in Paris.
Jury list	Prize categories
Michèle Lamy – jury president – partner of Rick Owens; Jakob and MacFarlane – architects; Laurens Van Den Acker, senior VP, Corporate Design Renault; Laura Albert (aka Jt Leroy) – writer; Fabrice Rebois – consultant, former direction of Nova and Arte; Pierre-Paul Puljiz – producer, director, writer; Li Edelkoort – trend forecaster; Marina Skulskaya – historienne de la Mode, Russie; Anja Aronowsky Cronberg – editor in chief, Vestoj; Nicolas Girard Deltruc – executive director, Festival du Nouveau Cinema Montreal, Quebec, Canada; Shalini Ganendra – fine arts consultant and gallerist, Malaysia; Emmanuel Asmar – entertainment lawyer; Danielle Ryan – documentary film producer, art book publisher, founder of ROADS lifestyle brand; Antoaneta Metchanova – international creative director, Publicis 133; Valerie Steele – curator of FIT Museum, New York; Linda Loppa – director of Polimoda, Italy	ASVOFF 6 Grand Prix: Holi Holy – A Manish Arora Film by Bharat Sikka; Best Art Direction: BFC London Collections; Men FW13 by Matt Lambert; Best Acting; She Said, She Said by Stuart Blumberg; Best Styling: BFC London Collections: Men FW13 by Matt Lambert; Best Sound: Bishi Bhattacharya in Holi Holy – A Manish Arora Film by Bharat Sikka; Best Advertising: We & Claes Iversen by Lernert & Sander; Best Emerging Talent Awarded by Nowness: Bharat Sikka for directing: Holi Holy – A Manish Arora Film; Beauty Prize Awarded by Make Up For Ever: Make Up Artist Vicky Steckel in Sister Act by Ellen Von Unwerth; Best Documentary Awarded by Blakiston Gallery: Zillions by Malcolm Venville for Nowness; Fashion film aperitivo by Peroni: Nastro Azurro, live performance by Joana Preiss at Cannes Magnum Beach
Satellite Venues
Athens, with Fashion Workshop by Vicky Kaya Fashion on Screen; Munich, with ABSOLUTE Creatives; Tokyo at Cinema Rise X in Tokyo; Cannes at the Cannes Film Festival croisette's Villa Schweppes; Saint Petersburg Aurora Fashion Week; Montreal, Festival du Nouveau Cinema; Arnhem, Arnhem Biennale; Vladivostok, with the Ministry of Culture of Russia and Aurora Fashion Week; Paris, la Gaîté lyrique

=== 2014 === ASVOFF 7, under jury president Dries Van Noten, was held at the Centre Georges Pompidou in Paris.
Jury list	Prize categories
Dries Van Noten, fashion designer, president of ASVOFF 7; Eugene Hernandez – deputy director of Film Society of Lincoln Center; Bruce Benderson – writer; Antoine Barraud – writer, director and actor; Sophie Dulac – Sophie Dulac Distribution; Sebastien Tiveyrat – Swashbuckler Films; Moises Cosio – film producer; Liza Blakiston – art gallerist; Serge Carriera – lecturer (Institut D'etudes Politiques), retail merchandising director (MuiMiu); Jakob + Macfarlane – Architects; Li Edelkoort – curator, trend forecaster; Antoaneta Metchanova – creative director Publicis 133; Emmanuel Asmar – business and entertainment lawyer; Samuel Drira – Encens magazine publisher; Rem D. Koolhaas – creative director United Nude; Rain Li – film director; Andrei Vasilenko – programmer Vladivostok International Film Festival; Eric Legendre – Variety International account manager	ASVOFF Grand Prix 2014 – JUMPER by Justin Anderson for Jonathan Saunders; Best Art Direction – JOURNEY by Monica Menez for S Moda; Best Actor – Annarose Cattanach in DOLLY by Laura Hypponen for Agent Provocateur; Best Styling – NUKELADY by Sofia Sanchez and Mauro Mongiello for iFashion; Best Sound Design – THE SOUND OF COS by Lernert & Sander for COS; Beauty Prize/awarded by Shu Uemura – Barbara Casaola: Menswear for Women by Marie Schuller for SHOWstudio; Emerging Talent Prize – CONNECTING by Jacob Brown for V Magazine; Best Advertising – L'ERRORE by Brando De Sica for Catherinelle; Blakiston Documentary Prize – TRAVELLING AT NIGHT WITH JIM JARMUSCH by Lea Rinaldi
Satellite Venues
Cannes: Special Fashion Film Aperitivo Silencio 5 rue des Belges, Cannes on 19 May 2014, with projections of Travelling at Night with Jim Jarmusch (documentary by Lea Rinaldi) and short films by Julien Landais with Nora Arnezeder, and Alain Fabien Delon. Special Guest : Bertrand Burgalat.; In 2014, the festival ASVOFF was held in the U.S. for the first time through a partnership with Kering. The festival opened on 14 March 2014 at the FIAF's Florence Gould Hall. The screening consisted of 12 short films, and after the festival, the founder Diane Pernet held a Q&A with the filmmakers Mike Figgis (Leaving Las Vegas) and Jerry Schatzberg (Scarecrow). Among the selections were Bruce Weber's short made for Barneys New York and Figgis's famous short 'Agent provocateur' in which Kate Moss made her screen debut.; New York Scope Art Fair in New York, with films by Michael Nyman; Copenhagen, with CPH DOX; Łódź, LODZ Fashion Philosophy Week; Antwerp, with MoMu at MUSE; Mexico City, with Trendsétera, Museo Franz Mayer; Paris, in collaboration with Champs-Élysées Film Festival; Rome, with AltaRoma

=== 2015 === ASVOFF 8, under jury President Jean Paul Gaultier, took place 2–6 December at Centre Pompidou with Jean-Paul Gaultier, Nicolas Godin, Nicolas Saada, Mathias Kiss, and Iris van Herpen. The festival explores the genre of fashion film as well as new dimensions and interpretations in the fields of fashion and film through conferences, documentaries and even live performances (Pete Drungle and Loane).
Jury list	Prize categories
Jean Paul Gaultier, president; Alain Mikli, designer; Andrew Davis, creative director Wonderland and Rollacoaster; Butheina Kazim, co-founder of Cinema Akil; Dominique Jakob, Jakob + MacFarlane; Donald Schneider, creative director; Emmanuel Asmar, business and entertainment lawyer; Eric Daman, costume designer; Harold Koda, curator of the Costume Institute at the Metropolitan Museum of Art; Jean Pierre Marois, Les Bains; Lyne Cohen Solal, former Marie de Paris, fashion expert; Maarten Le Roy, executive producer ADULT; Marc Happel, costume director of the NYC Ballet; Mathias Kiss, artist/set designer; Pascal Mourier, RdC France 24 Mode; RANKIN, photographer, publisher; Rem D Koolhaas, creative director United Nude; Stephen Jones, hat designer	ASVOFF GRAND PRIX 2015 – Hungry for Love by Justin Ambrosino; Best Art Direction – Kitchen by Tim Yip; Best Acting – Max Tortora in Non Senza di Me by Brando DeSica; Best Styling – Advanced Style by Lina Piloplyte with Ari Seth Cohen for NOWNESS; Best Sound Design – Gianluca Andreucci (J-E-A-N) for Wonder Mark by Ivan Olita; Beauty Prize/awarded by Shu Uemura – Team Leslie Kee for The Independents by Leslie Kee for Yohji Yamamoto; Best Advertising – Peep Shoe by Lernert & Sander for 3.1 Phillip Lim; Best Emerging Talent – Under by Kevin Frilet; Student Prize – JO! by Septa Absharin Husna for Siqi Wu, The Rule by Sara Laurena and a Special Mention for actress Benedetta Barzini, in Spirit of Our Time by Livia Alcalde for Tom Rebl.
Satellite Venues
Chicago at the Gene Siskel Film Center

=== 2016 ===
Locations

- Cannes: Fashion Film Cocktail at the Mouton Cadet Wine Bar in the Palais des Festivals (6etg) Boulevard de la Croisette on 14 May
- Boston: Museum of Fine Arts in Boston (Harry & Mildred Remis Auditorium) on 6–8 October
- Shanghai: A Shaded View on Fashion Film in China
  - 14 October: The Mix Place, Shanghai and Shanghai Hengshan Cinema
  - 15–16 October: Shanghai West Bund Art Space
  - 21–22 October: Shanghai Himalayas Museum
  - 23 October: Power Station of Art, Shanghai

=== 2017 === ASVOFF 9, under jury president Eric Daman, was held at Nu Boyana film studios on 9, 10 and 11 June.
Jury list	Prize categories
Eric Daman – president, costume designer, fashion model, TV personality and author; Waris Ahluwali, actor and designer House of Waris; Serge Carreira, Maitre de conferences a Sciences Po Paris; Isabel Coixet, director and writer; Ivaylo Grancharov, head of education at Nu Boyana Film Studios; Marc Happel, director of costumes at NYC Ballet; Yoann Lemoine, director, singer, Woodkid; Alex Murray Leslie, curator Wearable Technology Fashion Film Competition; Klaus Stockhausen, Zeit Magazine – fashion editor, stylist; Wilson J. Tang, studio art director at Kabam; Robb Young, strategic consultant, brand development, fashion and luxury goods, Global Markets BOF; Cuba Tornado Scott, artist and model	Grand Prize – Sean Baker, Snowbird; Best Artistic Direction – Romain Gavras, Gosh; Best Editing – Emir Eralap, In and Out of Control; Best Actor/Actress – Emir Eralap, Emmanuelle Seigner in How to Get Rid of a Ghost; Best Styling – Ibrahim Kamara in Gidi Gidi Bu Ugwu Eze "Unitity is Strength" by Akinola Davies Jr.; Best Sound Design – Marc Mahfoud in The Parallel Pyramid Platform by Dennis Vanderbroeck; Best Beauty – Greshka in He Was by Fred Lebain and Gregoire Pedron; Best Advertising – Petra Collins – Gucci Dreamscape; Best Emerging Talent – Pablo Masters for Winter Eclipse; Best Cinematography – Arthur de Kersauson and Clement Beauvais for Tales of the Wild 2 Gaucho; Best Wearable Technology Fashion Film – Lucy McRae for Institute of Isolation; Jury Prize – Matt Lambert – Christeene; Student Prize: Luzie Loose – Lui/Lei
Satellite Venues
Cannes: Fashion Film Cocktail at Mouton Cadet Wine Bar in the Palais des Festivals on 23 May; Sofia, Bulgaria, at the Nu Boyana Film Studios on 9, 10 & 11 June; Paris, at the Palais Brongniart, in collaboration with Blossom and Première Vision, on 4 & 5 July

=== 2018 === ASVOFF 10, under jury president Rossy de Palma and president of honor Jean Paul Gautier, was held at the Club de l'Etoile, Paris.
Jury list	Prize categories
President – Rossy de Palma – actress; President of Honor – Jean Paul Gaultier; Roger Avary – film director, screenwriter and producer; Eric Daman – costume designer, TV personality and author; Pamela Golbin – chief curator of the Musee de la Mode et du Textile; Patrice Haddad – film producer, CEO of Premiere Heure and president of the Red Star Football Club; Michele Lamy – Lamyland and creative collaborator and business partner of Rick Owens; ORLAN – artist; Stephan Rabimov – director of Fashion Journalism & Social Media Center at the Academy of Art University	Grand Prix in partnership with PERSOL – Jordan Blady – Grisha's Guide to Kyiv; Best Documentary – Elisha Smith-Leverock – Miss Black Germany; Best Cinematography – Ivan Olita – Glow Cinematographer – Gigi Martinucci; Best Sound Design – Matt Lambert Charles Jeffrey – Loverboy; Best Art Direction – Diane Russo – Our Time Art Director – Nick Vogelson; Best Editing – Maximilian Homaei – Women in Shadow – Editor – Joel Pront; Best Acting – Suzie and Leo – The Great Newman – Actor – Stanley Weber; Best Advertising – Autumn de Wilde – Postman Dreams for Prada; Best Beauty – Best Beauty Isaac Lock – BLACK – Hair: Roxy Attard Make-Up Daniel Sallstrom; Best Styling – Nadia Lee Cohen – Sgualdrina For GCDS – Stylist – Mariaelena Morelli; Best Emerging talent – Alec Davis – Stuck Inside; Student Prize x Premiere Heure – Alec Davis – Stuck Inside; ASVOFF + Kids of the Banlieue collaboration between Ecole de la Cite + Casa 93
Winner: Adele Bouvier for Stella Global Champion's Award – for Journalism – Loic Prigent; Global Champion's Award – for retail – 24Sevres Ian Rogers; Global Champion's Award – for designer – Kim Jones, Dior
ASVOFF 10 "My Personal Love Affair with Rome" Edition
Winner: The Epicurean by Jeff Bark Global Champion's Award – for Journalism – Angelo Flaccevento; Global Champion's Award – for retail Federico Marchetti, YOOX/Net-a-Porter; Global Champion's Award – for designer Alessandro Michele, Gucci
Satellite Venues
Rome, Palazzo Altemps

=== 2019 === ASVOFF 11, under jury president Heron Preston
Jury list	Prize categories
President – Heron Preston – Fashion designer; Ruvén Afanador – Photographer; Roger Avary – Film Director/Screenwriter/Producer; Manish Arora – Fashion designer; Maxime Plescia-Buchi – Creative Director/Tattoo Artist; Bryan Boy – Influencer; Patrice Haddad – CEO Premiere Heure/Producer; Marc Happel – Director of Costumes at New York City Ballet; Farida Khelfa – Documentary Film Director/former Model/Actress; Krista Kelloway – Production Manager/Producer; Callum Mullin – Model/Influencer; Steve Olson – Artist/Skateboard Icon; Cuba Tornado Scott – Film Director/Model; David Teplitzky – Art Collector/Influencer	Grand Prix – Victor Claramunt (Spain) – North Sails la Mer; Best Beauty – Matt Lambert (USA) - We Belong to Something Beautiful – Make-up: Lucas Wilson; Best Art Direction – Lui Yang (Thailand) – X Dazed; Best Advertising – Raphael Cloffi + Thibault Della Gaspera for Jean Paul Gaultier (France) – "Jeanpod", How to Walk Like a Catwalk Model; Best Acting – Matthew Frost (USA) – Boomerang – Actor: Mackenzie Davis; Best Emerging Talent – Chiara Sabatini (Italy) – Soeur; Best Styling – Jakub Gulyas (Slovakia) - Dolls - Stylist: Maria Vedral Kohutik; Best Cinematography – Michel Socha (Poland) – Moncler Cut – Cinematographer: Maciej Grzbowski; Best Sound Design – Lucas Garzoli (USA) – Loverboy - Sound Design: Carlos Arias; Best Editing – Felix Umarov (Russia) – Reebok, Always Classic – Editor: Vlad Yakunin; Jury Prize – Yuen Hsieh – Radiasian; Student Prize – Riffy Ahmed (UK) – Afloat

=== 2020 === ASVOFF 12, under jury president Roger Avary
Jury list	Prize categories
President – Roger Avary – Film Director, Screenwriter and Producer; Ruven Afanador – Photographer; Lillian Birnbaum – Photographer, Film Producer; Cori Coppola – Film Writer and Producer; Maria De Medeiros – Actress, Director, Singer and Writer; Rick Porras – Film/Media Producer; Violeta Sanchez – Actress, Model; Joanne Sawicki – Journalist, Film maker and Producer; Cuba Tornado Scott – Artist, Model and Film Director; Marine Serre – Fashion Designer	Grand Prix: "EVERYTHING IS FAKE UNTIL IT'S REAL" - Colm Dillane (USA) for Kid Super; Best Beauty: "BUSINESS AS USUAL" - Monica Menez (Germany) for Willems Eyewear - Hair & Make-Up: Suzana Santalab, Sabine Nania; Best Art Direction: "HYMN TO NONSENSE" - Alice Fass (Italy); Best Branded Content: "MAREE NOIRE" - Rick Farin and Claire Cochran (France) for Marine Serre; Best Acting: "ALEX" – Luca Spreafico (Italy) for Fredrica Bonifaci; Best Styling: "THE TOURNAMENT" - Mamik A. Boekaerts (Belgium) - Stylist: Florentina Leitner; Best Cinematography: "COMFORT ZONE" for Levau - Jordan Blady (Georgia) - Cinematographer: Igor Smitka; Best Script: "COMFORT ZONE" for Levau - Jordan Blady (Georgia) - Scriptwriter: Matt Shally; Best Sound Design: "FOOL AND IDIOT" - Lin Yu Feng (Taiwan) - Brand Beats by: Dre, Fool and Idiot; Best Editing: "PLUM FLOWER FIST" for Vogue Italia - Emma Tempest (USA) - Editor: Jobe Lowen; Best Documentary: "FINDING OASIS" - by Chomwan Weeraworawit (Taiwan) for Philip Huang; Student Prize: "STYX" - Nico Verhaegen (Belgium)
ASVOFF - ARTSTHREAD - FNL NETWORK prizes
Best Film "MIMICRY" - Grace Ling (USA) Runners-up "WASTOPIA" by Rick Farin (UK) and "HOME, A METAPHOR OF THE MIND" by Daniela Benaim Benhamu (UK)
Best "Lockdown Home Movie"
Best Film "CANTAUTOMA REBIRTH" by Gianluca Matarrese (France) and Davide Giorgio (Italy)

=== 2021 === ASVOFF 13, under jury president Bruce LaBruce
ASVOFF MAIN COMPETITION
Jury list	Prize categories
President – Bruce LaBruce – Film Director, Screenwriter and Producer; Daphne Guinness – Model, Collector, Commentator, and Muse; André Walker – Fashion Designer; Alex Murray-Leslie – Performer and Educator, Chicks On Speed band member; Bryanboy – Influencer, content creator, consultant; Daniel Lismore – Artist, Curator, Activist; Helen Downie – Artist; Kayann Contractor – Influencer, Content Creator, Editor; Lulu Kennedy – Founder and Director of Fashion East, Consultant; Lutz – Fashion Designer; Osei Bonsu – Curator of International Art at Tate Modern, Contributing Editor at Frieze; Pam Hogg – Cult fashion designer, DJ; Róisín Murphy – Ireland's Queen of the Avant-Garde, Performer; Sara Sozzani-Maino – Deputy director of Vogue Italia, head of Vogue Talents; Nicholas Kemp – Senior Director of Marketing at Kino Lorber; Susie Lau – Journalist, Content Creator, Consultant; Suzanna Vock – Founder of the GWAND Sustainable Fashion Festival; Willy Ndatira – Artist, Media entity, Creative consultant, Writer, Consulting editor for Fantastic Man; Yu Masui – Fashion Writer, Consultant, Content Creator	Grand Prize: "WHAT DO YOU WANT TO DO BEFORE YOU DIE?" - Colm Dillane (USA) for Kid Super; Best Beauty: "BIOMIMICRY" - by Iris Van Herpen for Ryan McDaniels; Best Art Direction: "THE HAIRY NOTION OF A GREEN AFTERNOON" - Susanne Deeken; Best Advertising: "BIRD OF PARADISE" - by Suzie & Leo for Koche; Best Performance: "Cp Company 'NEXT LANDSCAPE'" – Luke Alexander and Rex McWhirter; Best Styling: "BURN IN HEAVEN" - Omar Perineau; Best Cinematography: "MISTRESS OF THE INNER WORLD" - Lilli Moors; Best Script: "COMFORT ZONE" for Levau - Jordan Blady (Georgia) - Scriptwriter: Matt Shally; Best Sound Design: "LA MALLE" - by Thomas Gerard, music by Louis Gins; Best Editing: "PARTS OF ME" - Akinola Davies, Jr.; Best Documentary: "Valentino Des Ateliers «VITA DI SARTI E PITTORI»" - Maurizio Cilli; Best Director: "IF THE PLAN DOESN'T WORK YOU'RE INSANE, IF THE PLAN WORKS YOU'RE A GENIUS" - Kidsuper and Colm Dillane
ASVOFF STUDENT PRIZE
Jury list	Winners
Camille Mervin-Leroy – Spatial designer and Artist; Miguel Villalobos – Multidisciplinary artist; Cori Coppola – Film Writer & Producer	Winner: "CHILDREN OF THE SOIL" - Sabrina Elman; Runner-up: "ADAGE" - Mathilde Delli
ASVOFF THEMED CATEGORIES
Jury list	Winner(s)
Digital fashion
Amber-Jae Slooten - theme Curator; Morten Grubak; Chavonne Wong	Theme Winner: "KHOMANTA" - Fiorella Pomarino
Fashion Moves
Daphne Guinness – Theme Curator; Panja Göbel; Peter McNeil; Freiderike Fast; Lisa Walker; Yuka Oyama; Mohammad Bayesteh; Florian Schneider	Theme Winner: "DANCE PARTY" - Melissa E. Logan and Nikolas Muller
Black Spectrum
Melissa Alibo – Theme Curator; Sandy Alibo; Skinny Macho; Harvey Ambomo	Theme Winner: "DIMENSION" - Ebeneza Blanche
Conscious Fashion
Bandana Tewari – Theme Curator; Patrick Duffy; Florian Müller – Fashion PR, Guest Management, Writer (MÜLLER PR & CONSULTING)	Theme winner: "COTTON FOR MY SHROUD" - Nandan Saxena, Kavita Bahl
Satellite Venues
Tierra Luna Club Cultural, Xalapa-Enríquez, Ver., Mexico

=== 2022 === ASVOFF 14, under jury president Caroline de Maigret and honorary president Jean-Charles de Castelbajac
ASVOFF MAIN COMPETITION
Jury list	Prize categories
President – Caroline de Maigret – Author, Music Producer and Chanel Ambassador; President of Honor – Jean-Charles de Castelbajac – Fashion Designer, Artist; Andrew Taylor-Parr – Visual Image Director of Comme des Garçons; Pam Hogg – Fashion Designer; Hanan Besovic (ideservecouture) – Influencer; Sara Driver – Independent Filmmaker and Producer and Actress; Jay-Jay Johanson – Composer, Musician, Artist; Laura Albert – Author, Screenwriter; José Lévy – Multi-dimensional artist; Lucien Heritier – Designer, Musician, Stylist, Photographer, Content Creator; Klaus Stockhausen – Fashion Director and Zeit Magazine Consultant; Katia Kulawick-Assante – Luxury and Lifestyle Journalist; Romain-Eugene Campens – Multi-dimensional artist; Matthieu Orlean – Artistic Advisor for temporary exhibitions at the Cinematheque Francaise; Djeason Valerio – Set Designer	Grand Prize: "AN ODE TO TEENAGEHOOD (AND DYSFUNCTIONAL FAMILIES)" by Celia Arias; Best Beauty: "TWO or THE WEIGHT OF ONESELF" - by Daniel Cubero; Best Art Direction: "TWO or THE WEIGHT OF ONESELF" - by Daniel Cubero; Best Advertising: "DANCE EN FAMILLE" - by Adrien Dantou Advertising for SÉZANE; Best Acting: "ALGORITHM" – by Matthew Frost; Best Styling: "HUM (We_Us)" - by Ashim Ahluwalia; Best Cinematography: "BRIDE ARMOUR" - by Jeana Elizabeth Theron; Best Sound/Score: "TANGER NOSTALGIA" - by Julien Sitruk; Best Editing: "INFINITE" - by Christian Hunter and Martin Gatti; Best Documentary: "AJARIAN BRIDE'S TREASURE" - by Irma Sharkadze; Best Documentary: "WALLACE CHAN: THE ART OF MATERIALS" - Martina Margaux Cozzi
ASVOFF STUDENT PRIZE
Jury list	Winners
Cori Coppola – Film Producer; Miguel Villalobos – Artist, Photographer, Sculptor	Winner: "THE FEAST" - by Victoria Gong
ASVOFF THEMED CATEGORIES
Jury list	Winner(s)
Fashion Moves
Alex Murray Leslie – Theme Curator, Professor of Digital Performance, Trondheim Academy of Fine Art / co-founder Chicks on Speed; Sophia Efstathiou – Science Philosopher; Svein Inge Saether – Manager ARTHOUSE/Film Curator; Maria Veie – Curator/Critic/Publishing Editor; Leslie Johnson – Artist/Pedagogue	Theme Winner: "ROBERTS MUM GEORGIE" - by Robert George Sanders
Conscious Fashion
Giorgia Cantarini – Theme Curator, Senior Fashion & Digital Editor l'Officiel Italia and Talents & Sustainability curator Pitti Immagine; Matteo Ward – CEO Co-founder WRAD; Florian Müller – Fashion PR, Guest Management, Writer (MÜLLER PR & CONSULTING); Simon Whitehouse – CEO at Eco-Age; Graham Tabor – Designer, Luxury Brand Strategist; Samata Pattinson – CEO RCGD at Oscars	Theme winner: "OVERHEATED" - by Yassa Khan
Chinese Films
Gemma Williams – Theme Curator, author, editorial director; Camille Mervin-Leroy – Theme Curator, Spatial designer and Artist; Lucia Liu – Stylist/Creative Director; Lawrence Xiao – Publisher/Editorial Director at NOWNESS; Tasha Liu – Director Labelhood	Theme winner: "HONG" - by Xiao Han
Manga/Anime
Charles Daniel McDonald – Theme Curator, Journalist, Editor-in-Chief FORC Magazine; Lolena Myneniko – Artist, Illustrator and Designer; Mina Petrovic – Author, Pop Culture Lecturer and Manga Teacher; Linnea Kataja – Manga Artist, Social Media Influencer; Alexa Pasztor – Illustrator, Lay out Artist; ANIME ACADEMY; Takaya Tanoura – Anime Art Academy Founder; Naohiro Muta – Anime Art Academy Founder; Ebi Blue – Anime Art Academy Editorial Supervisor	Theme winner: "THE SPRAYER" - by Farnoosh Abedi
TicTok
Ivo Barraza Castaneda – Theme Curator, artist/fashion designer; Celia Cazals – Fashion Stylist/Consultant; Jesse Brouns – Freelance Journalist; Serge Carreira – Director of Emerging Brands at the Federation of Haute Couture and Fashion	Theme Winner: "LOIC PRIGENT BUYING JACQUEMUS" - by Ideservecouture
Black Spectrum
Melissa Alibo – Theme Curator, Marketing Consultant; Gary Dourdan – Actor, Musician; Stephen Deberry – Bronze Venture Fund, Entrepreneur and Anthropologist; Yasmina Junek – Senior Partnership Manager Puma; Jason Heath – Electronic Music Creator/Producer; Harvey Ambomo – Epicurean	Theme Winner: "MATHLETE" - by Ebeneza Blanche
Satellite Venues
Berlin Fotografiska festival, from March 23, 2023

=== 2023 === ASVOFF 15, under jury president Jay-Jay Johanson
ASVOFF MAIN COMPETITION
Jury list	Prize categories
President – Jay-Jay Johanson – Composer, Musician, Artist; Charlotte Colbert – Film Director; Harry Goaz – Actor, Artist; Giuliano Calza – Fashion Designer GCDS; Thebe Magugu – Fashion Designer; Gabrielle Lazure – Actress; Bina Daigeler – Costume Designer; Pascal K. Douglas – Editor-in-chief at Paul.E Magazine; Mei Hui Liu – Fashion Designer; Paolo Calia – Photographer, Set Designer; Cuba Tornado Scott – Model, Film Director, Photographer; Lucien Heritier – Designer, Musician, Stylist, Photographer, Content Creator DSMP; Djeason Valerio – Set Designer and scenographer DSMP; Odunayo Ojo aka Fashion Roadman – youtuber and journalist; COUTURFU – Influencer; Omoyemi Akerele – Founder Lagos Fashion Week; Peter Stephen Jungk – Author; Melissa Alibo – PR, Marketing Consultant, Writer; Emma Davidson – Fashion Features Director Dazed; Pierre A. M'Pele aka Pam Boy – Head of editorial content GQ France	Grand Prize: "TO DIE FOR" by Dylan Eno Sprik; Best Beauty: "DAPHNE GUINNESS HIP NECK SPINE" by Milosh Harajda; Best Art Direction: "I REMEMBER MY DREAM" by Jhenyfy Muller; Best Advertising: "0000 A FILM" by Injury; Best Acting: "CHOCO HOAX" by Alice Fassi; Best Styling: "I REMEMBER MY DREAM" by Jhenyfy Muller; Best Cinematography: "ARTIFICIAL FLOWER" by Zehua Wu; Best Sound Design: "NOCTURNA" by Ed Edwards & Kim Ryan; Best Editing: "HANGUK" by Hunter and Gatti
ASVOFF THEMED CATEGORIES
Jury list	Winner(s)
Climate Warriors
President Liv Elbaz Paris; President of Honor Jose Levy – Artist; Paola; Renée; Lou-Anne	Theme Winner: "ACTION NOW" - by Suzanne Veuriot
Best Student Film
Lillian Birnbaum; Miguel Villalobos	Theme Winner: "ETHEREAL MAIDEN" - Boiana Ludmilova Aleksandrova, Robin Ellis Lee; Honorable Mention: "B PERFECT" - by Emma Alice Skarniak
AI Generated Films
curated by Pedro Guez; Artificial Intelligence (AI); Stephy Fung; Opé; Sebastian Felix Topescu; Anna Dart; Stella Achenbach; Aria Phenix; Guilherme Duque; Tafari Hinds	Theme Winner: "TENSHO" - by Ced Pakusevskij
The Queer Archive
curated by Konstantinos Menelaou; Mollie Mills; Ricardo Gomes; Richard Villani	Theme Winner: "THE DEMONS OF DOROTHY" - by Alexis Langlois
Black Spectrum
curated by Melissa Alibo; Young Paris; Evan Marshall; Yasmina Junek; Jason Heath; Harvey Ambomo	Theme Winner: "FROM THE GODS TO EARTH" - by Malakai
Exploring Chinese Fashion Film
curator Camille Mervin-Leroy; curator Gemma A. Williams; Tasha Liu; Lucia Liu	Theme Winner: "IT IS NOT SPRING UNTIL ALL FLOWERS BLOSSOM" - by Curry Sicong Tian
Responsible Actions
curator Sara Sozzani Maino; curator Matteo Ward	"JUNK CHILE" - by Olmo Parenti & Matteo Keffer; "JUNK GHANA" - by Olmo Parenti & Matteo Keffer
StreamedArt & Telematic Improvisations
curator Prof. Alex Murray-Leslie moderator David Herman moderator Alex Murray-Leslie moderator Kathi Glas moderator Giulia Timis moderator Mohammad Bayesteh
Exhibition
UNIVERSAL TONGUE by Anouk Kruithof
Satellite Venues
Paris at Silencio des Pres, Friday January 14th; Rome at the Romantica Station, April 13–14, Tempio di Vibe Sabna and Adriano Piazza di Pietra; Berlin at the Fotografiska festival, Atelier Gardens, March 2024

=== 2024 === ASVOFF 16, under jury president Michèle Lamy
ASVOFF MAIN COMPETITION
Jury list	Prize categories
President – Michèle Lamy – artist, entrepreneur, producer, collaborator, and performer; Co-Founding Partner, Owenscorp; Elias Medini – Storyteller, Performer and Influencer; Bina Daigeler – Actor, Artist, Costume Designer; Bob Recine – Hair Stylist; Fanny Fragu – Fashion Producer; Loane (Coste) – Singer & Songwriter; Matt Lambert – Filmmaker, visual artist and creative director; Pascal K. Douglas – Editor-in-chief at Paul.E Magazine; Matthieu Orléan – Artistic adviser at La Cinémathèque française; Harry Goaz – Actor, Artist, Photographer; Jay-Jay Johanson – Singer, Songwriter, Composer; Steve Olson – Skateboarder, artist; Pascal K Douglas – Fashion & Lifestyle Journalist, Editor, Trend Strategist, and Consultant; Fecal Matter – designer duo Steven Raj Bhaskaran and Hannah Rose Dalton; Sylvie Lancrenon – Photographer	Grand Prize: "SAFE FROM HARM" by WILLY CHAVARRIA; Best Advertising: "VIVIENNE WESTWOOD BRIDAL COLLECTIONS 2024 – COMPANIONSHIP" by Andreas Kronthaler - Producer: ANDREAS KRONTHALER; Best Acting: "ANYONE WHO KNOWS" by KATE HARPOOTLIAN - Actors: MARLA PHELAN, CODY HAYMAN, EVELYN CHEN; Best Beauty: "'ANNIE' A TRIBUTE TO GRACE JONES" by JHENYFY MULLER - Hair: ANASTASIA ALAWADHI, Makeup Artist: SARA YUNIS; Best Styling: "ANJA" by LUIS ROJAS, DANIEL FORERO - Stylist: MARIA PONCE; Best Sound Design: "WORK DRAINS MY SOUL BUT I LOVE IT" by TYRA GALIEVA - Sound Designer: SIMONE ANTONIONI, Music Artist: BILLY SANE; Best Editing: "THE CASTLE" by PANDEMONIA - Editing: PANDEMONIA; Best Cinematography: "ONE DAY" by GABRIEL KWAMI AGBOLO EFOE, CHERIF DOUAMBA - Editor and Colourist: KYNZA K-J @ KLOSS FILMS; Best Art Direction: "ARTIFICE" By KATE HARPOOTLIAN - Director of Photography and Editor: JONATHAS NAZARETH; Best Director: "SWALLOW DANCE" Directed by DENNIS TAE WOOK KIM
ASVOFF THEMED CATEGORIES
Jury list	Winner(s)
Goldfinch Writer's Award
President Kirsty belle – Founder and CEO of Goldfinch and co-founder of DREAMTOWN; Ben Charles Edwards - Producer, director and co-founder of DREAMTOWN Entertainment; Michelle Arnusch - Producer and co-founder of Glassloves	Theme Winner: "FAT QUEEN" by TIGGY BAYLEY
Dreamtown Innovator Award
President Ben Charles Edwards - Producer, director and co-founder of DREAMTOWN Entertainment; Kirsty belle – Founder and CEO of Goldfinch and co-founder of DREAMTOWN; Michelle Arnusch - Producer and co-founder of Glassloves	Theme Winner: "PARADISE" by CHILD
Climate Warriors Kids
President Adèle Olivier; President of Honor José Levy - Fashion Designer; Anais; Maya	Theme Winner: "CLIMATE WARRIORS" by XOCHITL BARAJAS VAZQUEZ
Climate Warriors Teens
President Marius Olivier; President of Honor José Levy - Fashion Designer; Eva; Lucy; Priscilla	Theme Winner: "USING WHAT YOU GOT" by WARREN COLE ACKERMAN
Student Films
President Miguel Villalobos; Marc Eley - designer Eley Kishimoto; Zoltan Alexander - Publisher/Editor-in-chief of THE INSTIGATOR	Theme Winner: "KERATIN" by CHARLIE JIMENEZ, SCARLETT WANG, CATARINA DIAS SILVA, STELLA ROSENKVIST, ISOBEL O GORMAN; Special Mention: "CAPTURE THE BAG" by WARREN COLE ACKERMAN
Best Chinese Fashion Film
curated by Gemma A Williams and Camille Mervin Leroy; Bao Yifeng; Bohan Qiu; Sijia Wei; Jeremy Z. Qi; Tasha Liu	Theme Winner: "MADE IN ITALY (BY THE CHINESE)" by DJ CLARK, MINGJIE WANG
Best AI Generated Film
curated by Pedro Guez and Daniel Face; AI; Tafari Hinds; Dr. Giovanna Graziosi Casimiro; Matthieu Grambert; Sebastian Felix Topescu; Omar Karim	Theme Winner: "STILLNESS" by NORA HASE; Special Mention: LOVE BYTES: "AI-MEE IS HEARTLESS" by MELODY LEMOON BOSSAN, ETHEREAL GWIRL
Mental Health in Fashion
curator Florian Müller; Affa Osman; Alexandra Bondi de Antoni; Benjamin Alexander Huseby; Dao Tran; Marie Lueder; Marvin Appiah Korang (aka "The Futurist"); Marvin-Mario Bahome; Sara Sozzani Maino	"EDITING THROUGH EXHAUSTION" by CHERYLL GISELA FE MÜHLEN
Documentary Films
curator Sam Basset; Peter Stephen Jungk; David Herman; Romain Roz	"SUMMERTIME À ESPARON" by MARTINE FOUGERON; Special Mention: "WHO IS SABATO DE SARNO? A GUCCI STORY" by HENRY SUPERMARCHÉ JOOST & ARIEL SUPERMARCHÉ SCHULMAN
Uploaded From the Corporal to the Virtual
curator Alex Murray Leslie; Ayodele Arigbabu; Lorenza Barboni Velo; Jawed Saboori	"THE CULTS" by DANI PLOEGER
Queer Archive
curator Konstantinos Menelaou; Liz Rosenfeld; Nadya Tolokonnikova; Slava Mogutin	"CIRCLE" by FERHAT ERTAN
Black Spectrum
curated by Melissa Alibo; Evan Marshall; Yasmina Junek; Jason Heath; Harvey Ambomo; Corey Winston	Theme Winner: "THE RIVER" by HERRANA ADDISU

== See also ==
- List of fashion film festivals
