= Paul Groothuis =

Dutch sound designer

Paul Groothuis is a Dutch sound designer who has had a long career working on the London stage. Groothuis was born in the Netherlands and moved to the UK in 1979 to study Stage Management at the Central School of Speech and Drama. He joined the National Theatre on the South Bank in 1984 and has designed sound for more than 120 NT productions. Some of his recent productions are Her Naked Skin, Rafta, Rafta..., The Man of Mode, The Life of Galileo, The Royal Hunt of the Sun, Once in a Lifetime, His Dark Materials, A Funny Thing Happened on the Way to the Forum and Stuff Happens. He has also designed sound for musicals at the NT, including Sunday in the Park with George, Sweeney Todd, A Little Night Music, Lady in the Dark and Guys and Dolls. In 1999, he won Live! Magazine Sound Designer of the Year Award for his work on Oklahoma! and Oh, What a Lovely War!.

Groothuis has been visiting lecturer at the Hong Kong Academy of Performing Arts. He is also a sound consultant for the Kingston Theatre.
