= Freya Hannan-Mills =

English actress (born 2004)

- Born: 2004 (age 21–22); Wallasey, Merseyside, England
- Occupations: Actress, writer, director
- Years active: 2015–present
- Known for: Hamnet, Swimming Home

Freya Hannan-Mills (born 2004) is an English actress, playwright, and director. She first came to national attention as a "writing prodigy" in 2017 when her play Mushy Peas and Battered Bits was performed by Jude Law at the Lyric Hammersmith. Since 2024, she has established an international screen career, notably appearing as Eliza Shakespeare in Chloé Zhao's 2025 film Hamnet.

== Early life and career ==
Hannan-Mills was born in Wallasey, Wirral, in 2004. She attended Birkenhead Prep School before being home-educated during her early teens to balance her creative commissions. She later attended Bedales School in Hampshire and spent time in Vermont in 2018 as an exchange student at The Putney School.

Hannan-Mills' creative career began in playwriting. In 2016, she performed with the Complicité theatre company in the production Seen and Not Heard at the Southbank Centre. Her play Snow Angels (2017) was staged at the Lyric Theatre, London, after winning a place in the Daunt Books Anthology. That same year, her play Mushy Peas and Battered Bits was performed by Jude Law at the Lyric Hammersmith Gala. Hannan-Mills made her screen debut that same year in the BBC drama Doctors.

In 2020, her film Swallow won the Film the House award for Best Short Film Under 16, following its selection for the BFI Southbank's TriForce Short Film Festival.

Her performance as Nina in Justin Anderson's Swimming Home (2024) received critical praise; The Times described her performance as "striking," while Variety noted her "perceptive" portrayal. Sight and Sound further highlighted her presence in the adaptation. In 2024, she achieved breakout success starring as Alice Haynes in the psychological thriller series The Cuckoo alongside Jill Halfpenny. The series became a commercial hit on Netflix, reaching the number one spot on the platform's TV charts in the United Kingdom. She played Eliza Shakespeare in Chloé Zhao's Hamnet (2025). The following year she led the supernatural horror film Sticks and Stones, portraying Sam Evans, a teenager accused of murder.

== Filmography ==
=== Film ===
Year	Title	Role	Notes
2024	Swimming Home	Nina	
2024	Here After	Robin Miller	
2025	Hamnet	Eliza Shakespeare	
2026	Sticks and Stones	Sam Evans	Post-production; Lead role

=== Television ===
Year	Title	Role	Notes
2017	Doctors	Jasmine Wilson	Episode: "Role Models"
2021	Whitstable Pearl	Chloe Mills	Episode: "Woodness"
2024	The Cuckoo	Alice Haynes	Miniseries; Lead role
2024	Ellis	Maggie Bradley	Episode: "Hanmore"

== Awards and nominations ==
Year	Association	Category	Nominated work	Result
2018	Film the House Awards	Best Short Film (Under 16)	Turning Tides	Won
2020	Film the House Awards	Best Short Film (Under 16)	Swallow	Won
2022	Directors UK	Best Film Direction (Under 19)	I'll Be Back Tomorrow	Won
