= Diane Pernet =

French journalist

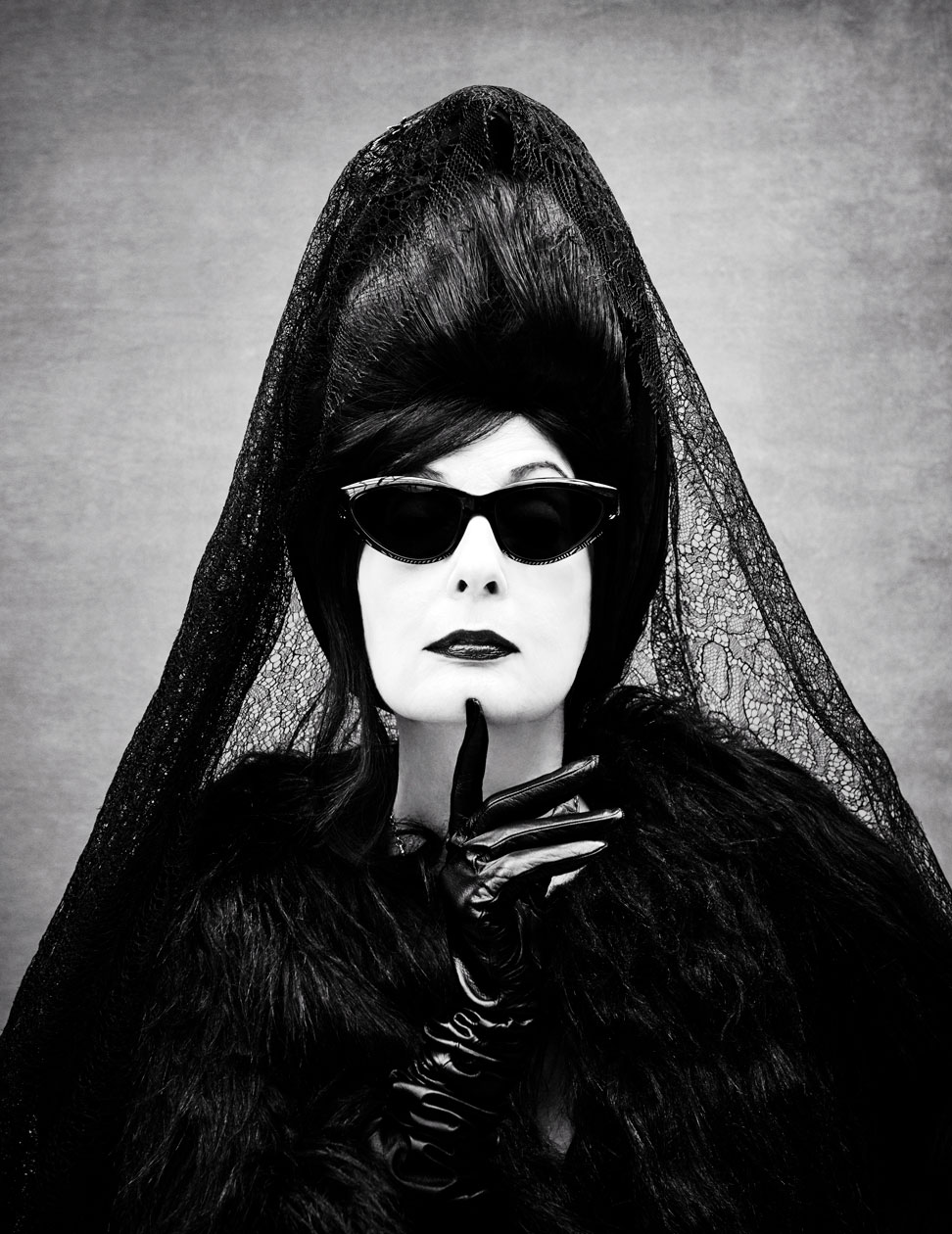
- Pernet in 2017
- Born: Washington, D.C., U.S.
- Education: Temple University
- Occupations: Founder/director of ASVOFF, fashion blogger and critic

Diane Pernet is a Paris-based American-born international fashion blogger and critic and founder of the international ASVOFF (A Shaded View on Fashion Film) festival.

== Education and early career ==
Pernet was born in Washington, D.C., on October 8, 1946, and received a degree in documentary filmmaking from Temple University. In addition to creating several films of her own, she has maintained a love for cinema ever since. Becoming a New York City fashion designer in the 1980s, she maintained a label of her own for 13 years.

Relocating to Paris in 1990, Diane Pernet's first job there was as a costume designer for director Amos Gitai and his film Golem, l'Esprit d'Exile. Her work for the CBC's Fashion File programme led to an appointment at Hong Kong Joyce magazine, where she was the women's fashion editor for five years.

== Fashion blog pioneer ==
Embracing fully the late-1990s internet revolution, Diane took on a "Dr. Diane" fashion-advice column at Elle, and covered the runways for Vogue Paris. Success in these endeavours led to the creation of one of the internet's first fashion blogs in 2005, A Shaded View on Fashion (ASVOF), an online fashion platform whose early success led The New York Times to anoint her "the original style blogger". Also prolific on other social media platforms, she influences thousands with her daily fashion news and updates. Vogue Business called her a "genuinfluencer," meaning an influencer who is genuine and has nothing to sell.

== Fashion film ==
In September 2006, to promote the launch of his brand's menswear line, Mark Eley of Eley Kishimoto commissioned her to make a documentary around a "Gumball 3000" (or "Gumball Rally") road-trip between London and Monte Carlo. It was this project and the interest that it generated that rekindled her love for cinema and motivated her to invent the 'fashion film' genre. Rather than exploring the idea through actual film-making, she decided to make it an open celebration in which anyone who shared her interest could participate. This was the genesis of her first "You Wear it Well" fashion-film festival that she, with photographer Dino Dinco, curated at the Los Angeles CineSpace from August 1, 2006.

This brainchild developed into a three-day A Shaded View on Fashion Film (ASVOFF) festival that was showcased for the first time in September 2008 at Paris' Jeu de Paume museum. With fashion film as a centerpiece, ASVOFF developed into a yearly travelling international event with satellite conferences, performances and exhibitions. Pernet has used the ASVOFF platform to support the photo-to-film transition for fashion mavericks including Nick Knight and Steven Klein.antenna venues in fashion events the world over

In 2020, Diane Pernet signed a deal with Rocco Leo Gaglioti for a new A Shaded View on Fashion TV channel on the FNL Network. A Shaded View on Fashion (ASVOF) Season-12 broadcast for the first time on October 6, 2020.

== Film appearances ==
Pernet's iconic personal style has attracted cinematographer attention as well: she has figured in the Robert Altman film Prêt-à-Porter, Roman Polanski's The Ninth Gate, Larry Clark's The Smell of Us and Ben Stiller's 2016 Zoolander 2. In 2021, she also appeared in Harmony Korine's film-documentary Balenciaga: The Lost Tape and the Season-2 finale for Emily in Paris.

== Other projects ==
- 2002–2011: Talent scout for the Hyères Festival
- 2007: Co-curator of NOOVO, a fashion and photography festival in Santiago de Compostela.
- 2007–2012: Co-editor-in-chief of Zoo Magazine (Germany)
- 2010: Curator of CineOpera, a series of films by the composer/director Michael Nyman for Corso Como, a fashion/art exhibition and an ASVOFF film program at the 2010 New York Scope Art Fair.
- April 2012: editor of Ninja, a fashion, art and photography magazine
- 2011–2017: fashion journalist for MFF (Milano Finanza Fashion).
- 2014: launches a perfume line of four fragrances.
- 2014–present: journalist for Modern Weekly, Shanghai.
- 2014-2020: Modern Weekly
- 2021: Member of the 'Georgian Fashion Foundation' advisory board
- 2021: Special Editor for The Edge Magazine

== Recognition ==
On March 30, 2008, Pernet was chosen, as one of world's top three influential global bloggers, to take part in a panel celebrating a seminal fashion exhibition at New York's venerated Metropolitan Museum of Art. From July 2015, Business of Fashion listed her as one of fashion's 500 most influential actors.

== Awards ==
- 2012: Recipient of the distinguished FAD Medal from the Barcelona-based cultural institution devoted to the promotion of design and creativity, FAD (Fostering Arts and Design).
- April 18, 2013: in an award ceremony on April 18 that year, Diane Pernet is the recipient of the 13th edition of the Felicidad Duce Fashion award for her career as a fashion editor, for her role as internet fashion-writer pioneer, and her role as lead blogger of the genre, and her role as the godmother of emerging fashion talent, as well as for her sensitivity to the film genre that combines art, film and fashion photography. The Escola Superior de Disseny Felicidad Duce Barcelona created this award in honor of its founder, Ms. Felicidad Duce.
- September 2014: In Perth, Australia, the President and executive board of the Asian Couture Federation awarded her the Award of Excellence for her outstanding contribution to fashion journalism.
- May 8, 2015: Pernet was invited by the School of the Art Institute of Chicago to be their yearly Legend of Fashion honoree for her career as a critic, filmmaker and style icon.
- 2013: Pernet is accepted into the Business of Fashion "BOF 500", a list of their 'most influential' fashion movers and icons, and from September 2015, she was promoted to their 500 Hall of Fame, the highest honour reserved for those who have demonstrated sustained achievement over the course of their fashion careers.
- 2017: elected Female Style Icon by Fashion.Net.
- October 2018: Pernet was awarded the Inspirational–Visionary award by BIG SEE (BIG South-East Europe) for her work in developing the fashion film genre, for and her blogging career, as well as for her influence in south-eastern Europe's fashion design and art trades.

=== Awards committees ===
- 2016: President of the Forward Fashion Tech Awards by Showroom Prive.
- 2017: Nominator for the Beazley award 2017. Designer nominated: Aitor Throup.
- 2019: Gwand Advisory Board Sustainable Fashion Festival

== Personal life ==
At the age of 28 Pernet married her first husband Norman, who she has met at the dentist chair. He died in a car accident three years later. After his death, Diane has been married three more times.
