= Deborah Levy =

British novelist, playwright and poet (born 1959)

Deborah Levy FRSL
- Born: Deborah Levy; 6 August 1959 (age 67); Johannesburg, South Africa
- Education: St Saviour's and St Olave's Church of England School; Hampstead School; Dartington College of Arts
- Occupations: Author, playwright, poet
- Notable work: Swimming Home (2011); Hot Milk (2016); August Blue (2023)
- Spouse: David Gale (m. 1997, divorced)
- Children: 2 daughters

Deborah Levy FRSL (born 6 August 1959) is a novelist, playwright and poet born in South Africa. She initially concentrated on writing for the theatre – her plays were staged by the Royal Shakespeare Company – before focusing on prose fiction. Her early novels included Beautiful Mutants (1989), Swallowing Geography (1993) and Billy & Girl (1999). Her more recent fiction has included the Booker-shortlisted novels Swimming Home (2011) and Hot Milk (2016), as well as the Booker-longlisted The Man Who Saw Everything (2019) and the short-story collection Black Vodka (2013).

== Early life and education ==
Levy was born in Johannesburg, South Africa, the granddaughter of working-class Lithuanian Jewish immigrants on her father's side, and an upper-middle-class "English colonial" family, as she described it, on her mother's side. Her father, Norman Levy, was a member of the African National Congress and an academic and historian. Her mother was Philippa (née Murrell). Her father was placed under a banning order by the Apartheid government from 1964 until the family fled to London in 1968.

The family initially lived in Wembley before moving to Petts Wood. Her parents divorced in 1974. Levy was educated at St Saviour's and St Olave's School, Southwark, and then at Hampstead School. She then trained at Dartington College of Arts, which she was inspired to attend by Derek Jarman, whom she met while working as an usher at Notting Hill's Gate Cinema.

== Work ==
=== Theatre ===
After leaving Dartington in 1981, Levy wrote a number of plays, including Pax, Heresies for the Royal Shakespeare Company, and others (Clam, The B File, Pushing the Prince into Denmark, Macbeth – False Memories, and Honey, Baby), which are published in Levy: Plays 1 (Methuen). She was director and writer for Man Act Theatre Company, a radical group that operated under the umbrella of Cardiff Laboratory Theatre, based at Chapter Arts Centre.

=== Poetry ===
Levy's major work as a poet is An Amorous Discourse in the Suburbs of Hell (1990), which takes the form of a conversation between an angel and an accountant. It considers the struggle between, on the one hand, spontaneity and ambition, and, on the other, logic and contentment.

=== Fiction ===
Levy published a collection of short stories, Ophelia and the Great Idea, in 1985. Her first novel, Beautiful Mutants, was published in 1987 by Jonathan Cape. Her second novel, Swallowing Geography, was published in 1993, also by Cape, and her third, Billy and Girl, was published in 1996 by Bloomsbury. Her short story "Proletarian Zen" was published in PEN New Fiction in 1985 by PEN International and Quartet Books. Swimming Home (And Other Stories, 2011) was shortlisted for the Man Booker Prize 2012 among other awards. Levy published a short story collection, Black Vodka (And Other Stories, 2013), which cemented her reputation as "one of the most exciting voices in contemporary British fiction". Her novel Hot Milk was published in 2016 and was shortlisted for the Man Booker Prize 2016. In 2019, her novel The Man Who Saw Everything was longlisted for the Booker Prize.

=== Autobiographies ===
Levy's first volume of autobiography, Things I Don't Want to Know, was written in response to George Orwell's essay "Why I Write" and was published in 2013. In 2018, she published a second volume, The Cost of Living. She has described them as "living" autobiographies, since they are "hopefully not being written at the end, with hindsight, but in the storm of life". The final volume, Real Estate, was published in May 2021.

=== Style and themes ===
In the London Review of Books in 2016, Alice Spawls commented on several unconventional characteristics of Levy's writing: she "doesn't like stable narrators", has a "preference for shifting perspectives – she especially likes looking at one character through another", and "is interested in women who don’t have homes and aren't sure where to look for them" ("women who like to dissect things, who reassure themselves with cataloguing and calculating, as though people and feelings could be contained by indices"). Spawls noted that Levy's stories "almost always begin with a failure of language", explaining that Levy "has said that she's not interested in the most articulate person in the room, and that her work is informed by the theatre director Zofia Kalinska’s statement: 'We always hesitate when we wish for something. In my theatre, I like to show the hesitation and not to conceal it. A hesitation is not the same as a pause. It is an attempt to defeat the wish.'"

Reviewing The Man Who Saw Everything in the New Statesman, Leo Robson provided this overview: "Levy’s project as a writer is itself about effacing borders – between the novel of ideas and the novel of sentiment, between the schematic and the fluent, the inevitable and the accidental, the cerebral and immersive, the sensuous (or somatic) and cerebral, the parochial and otherworldly, metaphor and literalism. If this sounds vague, it should."

In her review of Levy's 2013 story collection Black Vodka, Lauren Elkin emphasized the philosophical qualities of Levy's work, writing that "Levy makes an aesthetic and ethics of 'elsewhereness'--being apart is another way of being together--and she explores the bonds we choose to create or break, and the ones we can't decide about.[...] Levy sensitively conveys the phenomenology of textures, of skin and breath. Embedded in her coiled, polished sentences is the drive that pushes us together, and forces us apart."

According to Olivia Laing, August Blue (2023) has musical quality, fitting for her protagonist, Elsa, a famous concert pianist who has come to Athens in the wake of a catastrophe. They write that the narrative is "running forward in spurts, pausing, repeating key phrases".

2024, Levy delivered the New Statesman/Goldsmiths Prize Lecture, talking about "Why the Novel Matters". The core of all writing and living, she argued, is the various ways we negotiate with reality.

=== Academic ===
- 1989–1991: Fellow Commoner in Creative Arts at Trinity College, Cambridge
- 2006–2009: AHRB Fellow in Creative and Performing Arts at the Royal College of Art
- 2013–2015: visiting professor at Falmouth School of Art, Falmouth University,
- 2018–2019: fellow of Columbia University's Institute for Ideas and Imagination.

== Awards and honours ==
- 2001: Lannan Literary Fellowship, and 2004 Residency, Marfa
- 2012: Specsavers National Book Awards, UK Author of the Year prize shortlist for Swimming Home
- 2012: Man Booker Prize shortlist for Swimming Home
- 2012: BBC International Short Story Award shortlist for "Black Vodka"
- 2013: Jewish Quarterly Wingate Prize shortlist for Swimming Home
- 2013: Frank O'Connor International Short Story Award shortlist for Black Vodka
- 2016: Man Booker Prize shortlist for Hot Milk
- 2017: Fellow of the Royal Society of Literature
- 2019: Booker Prize longlist for The Man Who Saw Everything
- 2019: The Cost of Living ranked number 84 of The 100 best books of the 21st century by The Guardian.
- 2020: Prix Femina étranger for Things I Don't Want to Know and The Cost of Living, translated into French by Céline Leroy.

== Bibliography ==
Novels

- Beautiful Mutants. Viking. 1989. ISBN 978-0-670-82892-0.
- Swallowing Geography. Jonathan Cape. 1993. ISBN 978-0-224-02729-8.
- The Unloved. Jonathan Cape. 1994. ISBN 978-0-224-03038-0.
- Diary of a Steak. Book Works. 1997. ISBN 978-1-870699-29-7.
- Billy & Girl. Dalkey Archive Press. 1999. ISBN 978-1-56478-202-1.
- Swimming Home. And Other Stories. 2011. ISBN 978-1-908276-02-5.
- Hot Milk. Hamish Hamilton. 2016. ISBN 978-0-241-14654-5.
- The Man Who Saw Everything. Hamish Hamilton. 2019. ISBN 9780241268025.
- August Blue. Farrar, Straus and Giroux. 2023. ISBN 9780374602048.
- My Year in Paris with Gertrude Stein. Hamish Hamilton. 2026. ISBN 9780241457801

Short story collections

- Ophelia and The Great Idea. Jonathan Cape. 1989. ISBN 978-0-224-02596-6.
- Pillow Talk in Europe And Other Places. Dalkey Archive Press. 2004. ISBN 978-1-56478-333-2.
- Black Vodka, London: And Other Stories, 2013. ISBN 978-1-908276-16-2

Non-fiction

- Things I Don't Want to Know. Penguin. 2014. ISBN 978-0241146569.
- The Cost of Living: A Working Autobiography. Bloomsbury Publishing. 2018. ISBN 978-1635571912.
- Real Estate. Penguin 2021. ISBN 978-0-241-26801-8.
- The Position of Spoons: And Other Intimacies. Farrar, Straus and Giroux 2024. ISBN 978-0374614973

Poetry

- Deborah Levy, Andrzej Borkowski (1990). An Amorous Discourse in the Suburbs of Hell. Cape. ISBN 978-0-224-02653-6.

Plays

- Pax, 1984
- Clam, 1985
- Heresies, 1986
- Our Lady, 1986
- Eva And Moses, 1987
- Heresies & Eva and Moses: two plays. Methuen. 1987. ISBN 978-0-413-17170-2.
- Amorous Discourse in the Suburbs of Hell, 1991
- The B File, 1992
- Blood Wedding, 1992
- Call Blue Jane, 1992
- Walks on Water, 1992
- Shiny Nylon, 1994
- Macbeth – False Memory, 2000
- Plays 1. Methuen. 2000. ISBN 978-0-413-75490-5.
- Dream Mamma
- Honey Baby
- Ophelia and the Great Idea
- Pushing The Prince into Denmark
- 50 Minutes: The War War, Jaw Jaw, Bunny Play, 2025

Radio plays

- Unless, Carol Shields, BBC Radio 4
- Chance Acquaintances, Colette, BBC Radio 4
- Freud: The Case Histories, BBC Radio 4

== Adaptations ==
- Levy's short story Stardust Nation was adapted as a graphic novel by Andrzej Klimowski, emeritus professor at the Royal College of Art, and published by SelfMadeHero in 2016.
- A film adaptation of Swimming Home directed by Justin Anderson debuted at the 53rd International Film Festival Rotterdam in 2024.
- Rebecca Lenkiewicz directed a film adaptation of Hot Milk, which premiered at the 75th Berlin International Film Festival in 2025.

== Personal life ==
Levy married David Gale, a playwright, in 1997. They have two daughters, Sadie and Leila. The couple divorced by the time Levy turned 50.
