= A Country Called Home =

2015 American drama film

- Film poster
- Directed by: Anna Axster
- Screenplay by: Anna Axster; Jim Beggarly
- Produced by: Jason Netter; Nicolas Gonda; Anna Axster; Ryan Bingham
- Starring: Imogen Poots; Mackenzie Davis; Ryan Bingham; Mary McCormack; June Squibb
- Cinematography: Charlie Wuppermann
- Edited by: Kiran Pallegadda
- Music by: Ryan Bingham; Nate Barnes; Daniel Sproul
- Production companies: Alchemy; Raindance Entertainment; Knuckles One; Kickstart Productions
- Distributed by: Arc Entertainment
- Release dates: June 13, 2015 (LA Film Festival); February 26, 2016
- Running time: 93 minutes
- Country: United States
- Language: English

A Country Called Home is a 2015 American drama film directed by Anna Axster and starring Imogen Poots, Mackenzie Davis, Ryan Bingham, Mary McCormack and June Squibb. It is Axster's feature directorial debut.

== Cast ==
- Imogen Poots as Ellie
- Mackenzie Davis as Reno
- Mary McCormack as Amanda
- Ryan Bingham as Jack
- Presley Jack Bowen as Tommy
- June Squibb as Judy
- Norman Bennett as Bruce
- Shea Whigham as Cole
- Joe Stevens as Roger
- Josh Helman as James

== Release ==
The film premiered at the 2015 LA Film Festival. It was then released in theaters on February 26, 2016, and on VOD on March 1, 2016.

== Reception ==
The film has a 17% rating on Rotten Tomatoes. Mark Dujsik of RogerEbert.com awarded the film two and a half stars. Jesse Hassenger of The A.V. Club graded the film a C. Katie Walsh of IndieWire graded the film a B−.
