= The Cuckoo (TV series) =

British television series

- Created by: Barunka O’Shaughnessy
- Screenplay by: Barunka O’Shaughnessy; Rebecca Wojciechowski
- Directed by: Brian O'Malley
- Starring: Jill Halfpenny; Claire Goose; Lee Ingleby
- Country of origin: United Kingdom
- Original language: English
- No. of series: 1
- No. of episodes: 4

Production
- Executive producers: Suzi McIntosh; Mike Benson; Jonathan Ford; Barunka O’Shaughnessy
- Production company: Clapperboard Studios

Original release
- Network: Channel 5
- Release: 8 April – 12 April 2024

The Cuckoo is a 2024 British television series broadcast on Channel 5 in April 2024. It stars Jill Halfpenny, Claire Goose and Lee Ingleby.

== Synopsis ==
A family who have moved from the city to the countryside take in a mysterious lodger, Sian.

== Cast ==
- Jill Halfpenny as Sian
- Lee Ingleby as Nick
- Claire Goose as Jessica
- Freya Hannan-Mills as Alice
- Marjorie Yates as Aunt Fay
- Emily Healy as Roisín

== Production ==
The four-part series is from Clapperboard Studios and created by Barunka O’Shaughnessy. Filming took place in County Wicklow, Ireland. Filming took place in October 2023, with Brian O'Malley as director. Episodes were written by Rebecca Wojciechowski and O’Shaughnessy.

The series has Claire Goose and Lee Ingleby cast as a married couple with their daughter played by Freya Hannan-Mills, with Jill Halfpenny as Sian, their new Lodger and Marjorie Yates also cast. Halfpenny was initially in line to play the role of Jessica but pushed to play the protagonist role of Sian.

== Broadcast ==
The series was broadcast in the UK on four consecutive nights from 8 April 2024 on Channel 5.

== Reception ==
Emily Watkins of the i newspaper described it as "well-paced, well-acted, well-scripted". Alexi Duggins in The Guardian described the first episode as having "clunky dialogue".
