= Justin Anderson (film director) =

British film director and screenwriter

- Born: 23 March 1967 (age 59)
- Occupations: Film director; screenwriter

Justin Anderson (born 23 March 1967) is a British film director and screenwriter.

== Biography ==
Anderson trained as a painter at the Slade School of Fine Art in London, where he won the John Ruskin Prize for painting. He then worked as an assistant for Scottish artist Bruce McLean before continuing his studies at the Rijksakademie van beeldende kunsten in Amsterdam, where he first began experimenting with video. Upon returning to London, he made several short films for Levi's, shooting on Super 8 and 16 mm film. He then briefly worked at HHCL, an advertising agency, until moving to a shared studio with fashion designer Flora McLean, for whom he made Dress No. 1 for SHOWstudio's Future Tense series that was covered by Diane Pernet. He also directed another video that was featured on Vogue Italia.

Anderson has directed short films and commercials in collaboration with fashion designers such as Roksanda Ilincic, Richard Nicoll and Jonathan Saunders, fashion houses such as Armani and Agent Provocateur, as well as companies such as Replay Jeans and Schweppes.

In December 2014, Anderson was awarded the option of the Booker-nominated novel Swimming Home by Deborah Levy. In 2016, he shot a short film entitled The Idyll based on the short story Idylle by Guy de Maupassant. It features French actress Emma de Caunes and Scottish actor Dougray Scott. Swimming Home competed in Tiger Competition at 53rd International Film Festival Rotterdam, where it had its premiere on 29 January 2024.

== Filmography ==
Year	Title	Notes
2008	Dress No. 1	For House of Flora
2010	Chore	For Damaris
2010	A Poem for A	—N/a
2011	Bike	For Armani
2011	Les Fleurs du Mal	For Agent Provocateur
2011	Twin Parallel	—N/a
2012	Ariane	For Armani
2012	Get Richard	For Richard Nicoll
2013	Soup	For Bruce McLean
2014	Jumper	—N/a
2014	Hyperflex	For Replay
2016	Grape	For Schweppes
2016	The Idyll	Based on Idylle by Guy de Maupassant
2024	Swimming Home	Based on Swimming Home by Deborah Levy

== Awards ==
Year	Event/Body	Recipient	Award	Work	Ref
—N/a	Slade School of Fine Art	Justin Anderson	John Ruskin Prize	—N/a	
2010	A Shaded View on Fashion Film	Lauren McAvoy	Best Actress	Chore	
2011	A Shaded View on Fashion Film	Twin Parallel	Best Styling	Twin Parallel	
2012	A Shaded View on Fashion Film	Twin Parallel	Best Artistic Direction	Twin Parallel	
2012	Berlin Fashion Film Festival	Get Richard	Best Fashion Film	Get Richard	
2012	Berlin Fashion Film Festival	Get Richard	Best Idea	Get Richard	
2012	Bornshorts Film Festival	Get Richard	Best Fashion Film	Get Richard	
2014	A Shaded View on Fashion Film	Jumper	ASVOFF Grand Prix	Jumper	
2014	Berlin Fashion Film Festival	Jumper	Best Cinematography	Jumper	
2014	Berlin Fashion Film Festival	Jumper	Best Music	Jumper	
2014	British Arrows Craft	John Greswell, Christopher Taylor	Best Original Score	Jumper	
2015	Fashion Film Festival Milano	Justin Anderson	Best Established Director	Jumper	
