= Her Naked Skin =

Play by Rebecca Lenkiewicz

Her Naked Skin is a 2008 play by Rebecca Lenkiewicz, and was the first original play by a female writer to be produced at the Olivier Theatre at London's Royal National Theatre (two earlier plays written by women had been adaptations: Pam Gems's adaptation of The Seagull in 1991, and Helen Edmundson's Coram Boy in 2005). The premiere was directed by Howard Davies. In an interview, the National's director Nicholas Hytner stated "[Lenkiewicz's] new play ... will take its place in the Olivier rep alongside work by Shaw, Middleton and Tony Harrison."

== Plot ==
The play is set during British women's struggle for the vote in the early 20th century, beginning with a suffragette trying to pin a suffragette sash on the kings horse at the Derby and ending with the outbreak of World War I. It is centred on a love-affair between two fictional suffragettes, one upper-class called Lady Celia Cain (played in the premiere by Lesley Manville) and the other working-class called Eve Douglas (played in the premiere by Jemima Rooper). Much of the play is set in the cells of a prison where the characters are repeatedly sent.

== Inception ==
In a National Theatre programme note, Lenkiewicz has written "I used to work at the National Film Theatre as an usherette and on my breaks I'd often go out to the river with a cup of tea and scour the bookstalls under Waterloo Bridge. One large paperback volume Shoulder to Shoulder cried out to me to be bought. It was by Midge Mackenzie and was a documentary account of the suffragettes. It was a battered copy and cost a tenner...and from devouring that book came my urge to write about the period and a desire to put those women into the foreground once more; their bravery and brilliance."

== Reception ==
Most of the critical reaction to the premiere was good, managing four stars in the Evening Standard, Guardian, Independent and Time Out and three in the Times, though the critic from The Times criticised what he saw as the caricaturing of the male characters. Some critics also felt the lesbian love affair was concentrated on at the expense of the historical background, though some have argued against such as criticism.

== Original production - cast and creative team ==
=== Cast ===
- Emily Wilding Davison - Zoe Aldrich*
- John Seely/ Hunt - Julien Ball
- H. H. Asquith - David Beames*
- Doctor Klein/ Augustine Birrel - Ken Bones
- Flower Lady - Elicia Daly*
- Ensemble - Joe Dunlop
- Florence Boorman - Susan Engel
- Mrs Briggs - Stephanie Jacob
- Wardress - Ruth Keeling*
- Doctor Vale - Dermot Kerrigan*
- Mrs Major - Barbara Kirby*
- Felicity - Anna Lowe*
- Doctor Parker - Nick Malinowski*
- Celia Cain - Lesley Manville
- Edward Grey - Simon Markey*
- Mrs Schliefke - Pamela Merrick
- Charlie Power - Gerard Monaco
- Guard - Edward Newborn*
- Miss Brint - Harriette Quarrie*
- William Cain - Adrian Rawlins
- Eve Douglas - Jemima Rooper
- Nurse - Stephanie Thomas*
- Brown/ Potter - Tony Turner
- Keir Hardie/ Cecil - Robert Willox
- Mrs Collins - Deborah Winckles*

* = Also credited as Ensemble

=== Creative team ===
- Director - Howard Davies
- Designer - Rob Howell
- Lighting Designer - Neil Austin
- Projection Designer - Jon Driscoll
- Music - Harvey Brough
- Sound Designer - Paul Groothuis
