= Hot Milk (novel) =

2016 novel by Deborah Levy

- First edition
- Author: Deborah Levy
- Language: English
- Genre: Fiction
- Publisher: Hamish Hamilton
- Publication date: 2016
- Publication place: United Kingdom

Hot Milk is a 2016 novel by British author Deborah Levy. It follows the story of mother, Rose, and daughter, Sofia, who embark on a journey to a Spanish clinic in search of a medical cure for Rose's paralysis.

== Plot ==
Rose's paralysis confines her to a wheelchair and limits Sofia's freedoms. The proprietor of the clinic, Gómez, is charismatic but may be of questionable skill. While Rose undergoes treatment, 25-year-old Sofia becomes obsessed with Ingrid, a seamstress. Later, Sofia visits her father in Athens, from whom she has been estranged, and spends time with his new wife and daughter. Athens seems to be in a state of collapse, and the novel pictures both Greece and Spain in the throes of economic and political turmoil. Sofia is an anthropologist by training, and this informs her perspective on events.

== Critical reception ==
The novel received generally positive reviews. In The New York Times, Sarah Lyall described Sofia, the main character as "interesting and surprising."

== Nominations ==
- 2016 Man Booker Prize, shortlisted.

== Adaptations ==
In 2025, a film adaptation starring Emma Mackey, Vicky Krieps and Fiona Shaw and directed by Rebecca Lenkiewicz was released.
