= Laura Hyppönen =

Laura Hyppönen is a Finnish director and filmmaker, based in London. Her debut feature film is Live East Die Young (2012), which was nominated Best UK Picture at Raindance Film Festival and Golden Hitchcock at Dinard Film Festival. The film is distributed globally by French distribution company Reel Suspects and iTunes. Hyppönen's ten-part short film series Ten Faces of Anna (2014) won Best Actor Award at the French fashion film festival ASVOFF.
