= Swimming Home (film) =

United Kingdom film by Justin Anderson

- Teaser poster
- Directed by: Justin Anderson
- Screenplay by: Justin Anderson
- Based on: Swimming Home by Deborah Levy
- Produced by: Emily Morgan; Andy Starke; Paul Linhares; Marcos Tellechea; Giorgos Karnavas
- Starring: Christopher Abbott; Mackenzie Davis; Ariane Labed
- Cinematography: Simos Sarketzis
- Edited by: Napoleon Stratogiannakis
- Music by: Coti K.
- Production companies: Anti-Worlds; Quiddity Films; Lemming Film; Heretic
- Distributed by: Bankside films; Front Row Filmed Entertainment
- Release date: January 29, 2024 (IFFR)
- Running time: 99 minutes
- Countries: United Kingdom; France
- Language: English

Swimming Home is a 2024 black comedy-drama film directed by Justin Anderson in his directorial debut. Based on the 2011 novel of the same name by Deborah Levy, the film stars Christopher Abbott, Mackenzie Davis and Ariane Labed. The film revolves around Joe and Isabel, whose marriage is dying when Kitti, a naked stranger is found floating in the pool at their holiday villa. It is described as "a surreal and darkly comic journey into the unresolved traumas that lurk in the shadows of all our lives." The film is a co-production between companies based in the United Kingdom and France.

The film competed in Tiger Competition at 53rd International Film Festival Rotterdam, where it had its premiere on 29 January 2024.

== Premise ==
A woman discovers a naked stranger in her family villa's pool and invites him to help liberate her loved ones, sparking unexpected changes.

== Cast ==
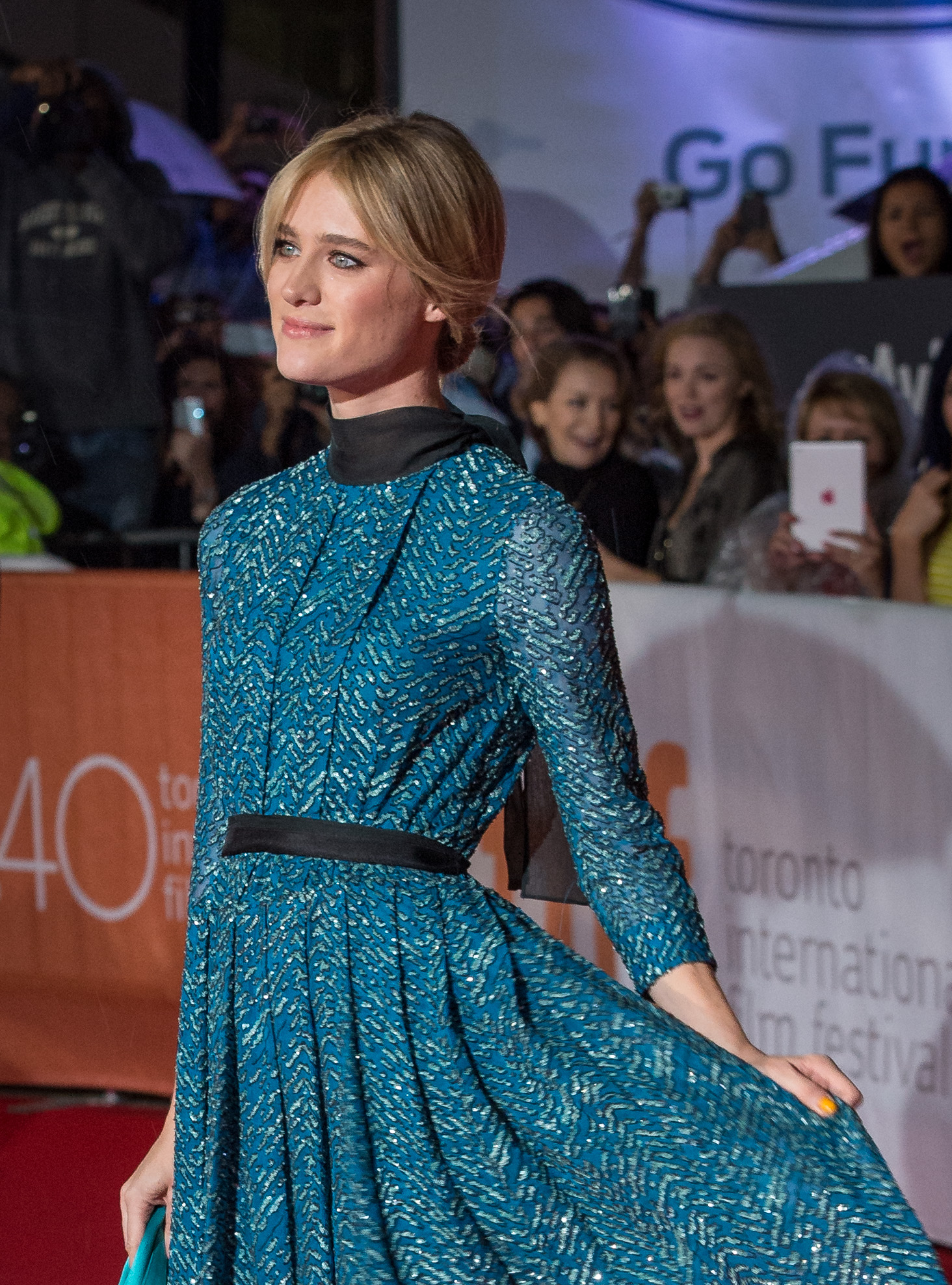
Mackenzie Davis in 2015

- Christopher Abbott as Joe
- Mackenzie Davis as Isabel
- Ariane Labed as Kitti
- Nadine Labaki as Laura
- Freya Hannan-Mills as Nina
- Anastasios Alexandropoulos as Vito
- Tzef Montana as Ponywoman
- Michalis Goumas

== Production ==
The film is an adaptation of Deborah Levy's Man Booker Prize-nominated novel of the same name. It was introduced at Cannes film market by the Bankside films. A directorial debut of Justin Anderson, it was funded by Curzon, Cineart and Madman Entertainment's Curzon CM Development Fund.

The film starring Ariane Labed, Christopher Abbott and Mackenzie Davis is produced by Emily Morgan of the United Kingdom's Quiddity Films, Andy Starke of Rook Films, Paula Linhares and Marcos Tellechea of Brazil's Reagent Media and Giorgos Karnavas and Konstantinos Kontovrakis of Greece's Heretic and Leontine Petit and Erik Glijnis of Lemming Film. It began filming in October 2022 in Greece.

== Release ==
The film had its world premiere at 53rd International Film Festival Rotterdam on 29 January 2024.

The film produced by Anti-Worlds, Quiddity Films, Reagent Media and Heretic in co-production with Lemming Film, is distributed by Bankside Films, WME and UTA.

== Reception ==
Victor Fraga writing in DMovies rated the film with 3/5 and wrote, that though "at times, Swimming Home drowns in its own extravagance and conceit, nevertheless, Justin Anderson’s debut feature will please many cinephiles, and it likely won’t be his last." Peter Bradshaw reviewing for The Guardian rated the film with 2 stars out of 5 and wrote, "Justin Anderson's film insists on a bafflingly unsexy and uninteresting type of erotic tension and conflates the result with a supposed repressed agony from the Bosnian war – which is invoked in the most glib and perfunctory way." Wendy Ide writing for ScreenDaily stated that "Swimming Home is a striking but willfully confounding experience." Ide opined, "It will not be for everyone, and the knotty symbolism of the storytelling may be better suited to its original form as a novel than to this film." She felt that "there’s a disconcerting, jarring quality to the story that is hard to shake – this is likely to be a conversation starter at further festivals and could find a home with a curated streaming platform."

David Katz reviewing for Cineuropa wrote that the film "is set in a filmic world several degrees away from real, from the tart and stilted repartee of the actors’ dialogue to its later sequences in a fetish-dance club and nudist lagoon that feel like landscapes of the unconscious."

=== Accolades ===
Award	Date of ceremony	Category	Recipient(s)	Result	Ref.
International Film Festival Rotterdam	4 February 2024	Tiger Award	Swimming Home	Nominated	
