= Hot Milk (film) =

2025 British film

- British theatrical release poster
- Directed by: Rebecca Lenkiewicz
- Written by: Rebecca Lenkiewicz
- Based on: Hot Milk by Deborah Levy
- Produced by: Christine Langan; Kate Glover; Giorgos Karnavas
- Starring: Emma Mackey; Fiona Shaw; Patsy Ferran; Yann Gael; Vangelis Mourikis; Vincent Perez; Vicky Krieps
- Cinematography: Christopher Blauvelt; Si Bell
- Edited by: Mark Towns
- Music by: Matthew Herbert, The Heat Inc. Ulli Mattsson
- Production companies: Film4; Bonnie Productions; Never/Sleep Pictures; Heretic
- Distributed by: Mubi
- Release dates: February 14, 2025 (Berlinale); July 4, 2025 (United Kingdom)
- Running time: 93 minutes
- Countries: Greece; United Kingdom
- Language: English
- Budget: £4 million
- Box office: £390,000

Hot Milk is a 2025 drama film written and directed by Rebecca Lenkiewicz. It is based on the 2016 novel by Deborah Levy. It follows Sofia (Emma Mackey) as she meets the enigmatic Ingrid (Vicky Krieps) during a trip to Almería with her sick mother Rose (Fiona Shaw).

The film had its world premiere at the main competition of the 75th Berlin International Film Festival on 14 February 2025, where it was nominated for the Golden Bear. It was theatrically released in the UK by Mubi on 4 July.

== Cast ==
- Emma Mackey as Sofia
- Vicky Krieps as Ingrid
- Fiona Shaw as Rose
- Vincent Perez as Dr. Gomez
- Patsy Ferran as Nurse Julieta
- Yann Gael as Matthew

== Production ==
When Christine Langan was still at Baby Cow Productions, she optioned the book, and sent it to Rebecca Lenkiewicz in 2018. Lenkiewicz agreed on the basis she would also get to direct. Film4 and sales agent HanWay Films boarded the film. £4 million was pulled together through the UK and Greek tax credits, pre-sales, Film4 support, private equity and an anonymous donor, who was a fan of Lenkiewicz's work. Despite Giorgos Karnavas' orders not to shoot in the hot Greek summer, production began in August 2023.

== Release ==
Hot Milk was screened in competition at the 75th Berlin International Film Festival on 14 February 2025. The film was first released theatrically in France on 28 May 2025, then in the United States on 27 June by Independent Film Company, and was released in the United Kingdom on 4 July by Mubi.

=== Critical reception ===
On the review aggregator website Rotten Tomatoes, 37% of 70 critics' reviews are positive. The website's consensus reads: "Lacking narrative momentum and clarity overall, this film's clever destination is upended by a turbulent journey that will leave audiences leaden like a glass of Hot Milk." On Metacritic, the film has a weighted average score of 55 out of 100 based on 12 critics, which the site labels as "mixed or average" reviews.
