= Andrea Bruschi =

Italian actor (born 1968)

Andrea Bruschi (born 1 May 1968) is an Italian actor who has appeared in a number of comedy, action, and suspense films, and has also worked as a producer, director, and screenwriter.

He also appeared in an episode of the HBO television series Rome entitled "An Owl in a Thornbush".

== Partial filmography ==
- I Medici - Masters of Florence (2016)
- The Nativity Story (2006)
- The Tulse Luper Suitcases, Part 2: Vaux to the Sea (2004)
