= Swimming Home =

Novel by Deborah Levy

- Cover of Swimming Home by Deborah Levy
- Author: Deborah Levy
- Language: English
- Publisher: And Other Stories
- Publication date: 1 November 2011
- Pages: 176 pages
- ISBN: 0571299601

Swimming Home is a novel by British writer Deborah Levy, published in 2011. The short novel deals with the experiences of poet Joe Jacobs, when his family vacation is interrupted by a fanatical reader.

Critical reception for the novel was generally favourable. On 25 July 2012 the book was longlisted for the Man Booker Prize, and on 11 September that year it was shortlisted. It was shortlisted for the Jewish Quarterly-Wingate Prize (2013). A film adaptation of the same name directed by Justin Anderson debuted at the 53rd International Film Festival Rotterdam in 2024.

== Plot ==
In the summer of 1994 the poet Joe Jacobs (Polish émigré Jozef Nowogrodzki) is on vacation in a summer home in Nice with his wife Isabel, his daughter Nina, and their friends, the couple Mitchell and Laura. The tranquillity is ruined when Joe's fan Kitty Finch turns up. Her fascination with, and sexual attraction to Joe are obvious, but Isabel invites her to stay anyway. Isabel is a foreign correspondent whose work has repeatedly taken her away from her family, and who has grown to tolerate Joe's constant infidelities.

Meanwhile, Kitty's mental problems become more and more obvious, yet Nina is the only one who dares to address the issue. Towards the end it seems clear that Kitty is poised to kill herself. In the end, however, it is actually Joe who kills himself. As it turns out, Kitty's mental issues were just a reflection of his much more deep-founded depression. The story ends with a current-day confessional from the now adult Nina to her late father.

== Critical reception ==
The Guardian's John Self found the central characters of the novel "perfectly presented", and also noted that it "has repeated passages which gradually mesmerise the reader." Philip Womack of The Daily Telegraph claimed that "[a]nyone who's been on a villa holiday will recognise the tensions that permeate Levy's stealthily devastating book." He lauded the "hallucinatory quality" of the book, concluding that "[e]verything has significance...This is an intelligent, pulsating literary beast." Julia Pascal, reviewing the novel for The Independent, describes the author's storytelling as "allusive, elliptical and disturbing." In particular she appreciates how Levy "upends expectation", turning the novel into "a haunting exploration of loss and longing."
