= Eley Kishimoto =

British fashion and design company

- Company type: Private
- Industry: Consumer Goods
- Founded: 1992
- Headquarters: London, UK
- Key people: Mark Eley, Wakako Kishimoto
- Products: Textile - Apparel clothing
- Website: www.eleykishimoto.com

Eley Kishimoto, is a British fashion and design company founded in 1992 by Mark Eley and Wakako Kishimoto. The London-based company is primarily known for its print design. The principal commercial activity of the company is womenswear fashion and accessories.

== History ==
Mark Eley graduated from Brighton Polytechnic in 1990 with a BA in fashion and weave. Wakako Kishimoto graduated from Central Saint Martins in 1992 with a BA in fashion and print. They first met in 1989 while interning in New York, and founded Eley Kishimoto in 1992, by producing prints for other designers including Alexander McQueen, Hussein Chalayan, Jil Sander and Marc Jacobs.

In 1996 the partnership created their first womenswear collection. Eley Kishimoto's first on-schedule show at London Fashion Week was in February 2001 when they showed their Autumn/Winter 2001 collection.

The company has also created numerous products to display their print designs, such as wallpaper, furniture and furnishing fabrics, glassware and crockery. The company also operates in areas usually ignored by fashion designers including the automotive industry, architecture, phone/computer technology and packaging, and artist and gallery collaborations.

In 2008, Mark Eley and Wakako Kishimoto were appointed as creative directors of French-based fashion house Cacharel.
