= Rebecca Lenkiewicz =

British playwright and screenwriter (born 1968)

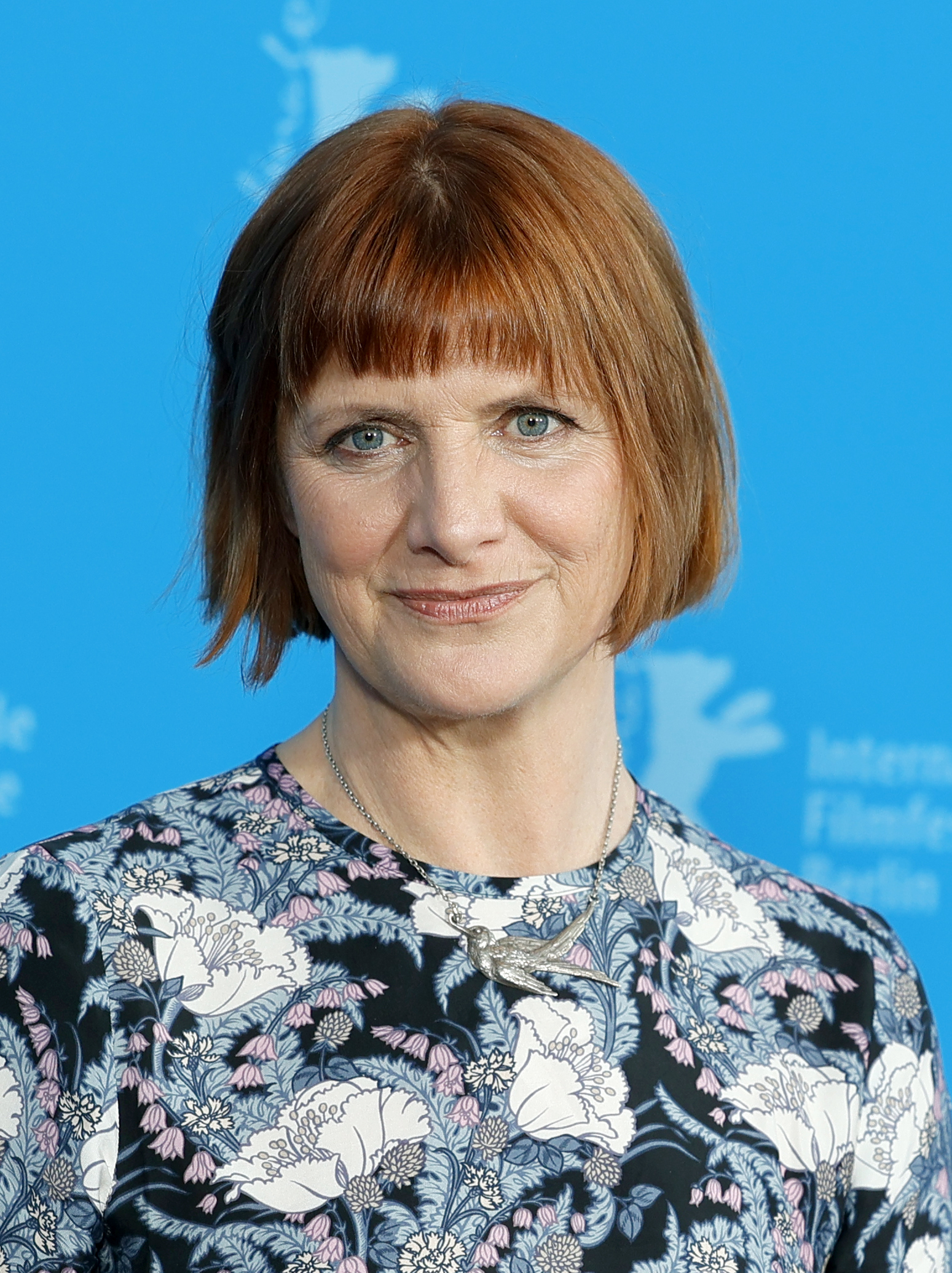
- Born: 1968 (age 57–58); Plymouth, England
- Education: University of Kent (BA); Central School of Speech and Drama (BA)
- Occupations: Playwright; screenwriter; film director
- Writing career
- Period: 2000–present
- Notable work: Her Naked Skin

Rebecca Lenkiewicz (born 1968) is a British playwright, screenwriter, film director, and former actress. She is best known as the author of Her Naked Skin (2008), which was the first original play written by a living female playwright to be performed on the Olivier stage of the Royal National Theatre.

Several of Lenkiewicz's plays have been published individually, and in 2013, Faber & Faber published a collection of her works.

== Early life and education ==
Lenkiewicz was born in Plymouth, Devon, to Celia Mills and Peter Quint, a playwright. Her stepfather is the artist Robert Lenkiewicz. Her sister is the artist Alice Lenkiewicz, and her brother is the artist Wolfe von Lenkiewicz, Reuben Lenkiewicz (Classical guitarist) who are the children of Robert Lenkiewicz. Her other brothers are Peter Mills and Thomas Mills.

She attended Hyde Park Junior School and then Plymouth High School for Girls before progressing to a BA in Film and English at the University of Kent from 1985 to 1989, then later to a BA Acting Course at the Central School of Speech and Drama from 1996 to 1999. Initially she worked as an actor at the Royal Shakespeare Company and the Royal National Theatre, notably in Sir Peter Hall's production of The Bacchae.

== Writing ==
=== Theatre ===
Lenkiewicz's first play was Soho: A Tale of Table Dancers which she wrote for the Royal Shakespeare Company Fringe in 2000. It won a Fringe First award at the Edinburgh Festival Fringe. Helen Raynor's production was revived in London on 2 February 2001, the first play to be staged at the Arcola Theatre. Lenkiewicz also appeared in the play in the role of Stella. Her second play, The Night Season (2004), set in Sligo, tells the story of an Irish family, the Kennedys, and their attempts to find love. It was staged at the Royal National Theatre in the Cottesloe auditorium by Lucy Bailey. In 2005, Lenkiewicz's Shoreditch Madonna, directed by Sean Mathias, was performed at the Soho Theatre. A tale of love among the artists in an East London gallery, it starred Francesca Annis and Leigh Lawson.

In 2006 Lenkiewicz wrote the script for the dance drama, Justitia, which was directed and choreographed by Jasmin Vardimon. It was initially performed at the Peacock Theatre and has since been on tour. This was followed by Invisible Mountains toured London schools as part of the National Theatre "Interact" project. She and Abdulkareem Kasid also created a new version of The Soldier's Tale, a music theatre piece by Igor Stravinsky and Charles Ferdinand Ramuz, set in Iraq. It was staged at the Old Vic. Then in August, her hour-long play Blue Moon Over Poplar was staged by the National Youth Theatre company at the Soho Theatre as part of the NYT's Golden Jubilee.

In 2008, her adaptation of Henrik Ibsen's An Enemy of the People opened at the Arcola Theatre, directed by its founder Mehmet Ergen. Her Naked Skin, directed by Howard Davies, premiered on the Olivier stage at the NT in July 2008. It describes the struggles faced by two suffragettes immediately prior to World War I. Faeries, was staged at The Egg, Theatre Royal Bath. Faeries is an original drama for children, using puppetry. It tells the story of a girl evacuated during World War II, and the adventures she has when she spends a night in the park. It was commissioned by the Royal Opera House.

The Lioness (June 2010) was performed at the Tricycle Theatre. It describes meetings that Elizabeth I had with John Knox and Robert Devereux, 2nd Earl of Essex. Lenkiewicz adapted Ibsen's Ghosts for a production at the Arcola Theatre in August 2010. The National Youth Theatre, at the Tramway Theatre in Glasgow, performed Stars over Kabul (September 2010). It tells the story of a young woman growing up in Kabul.

In January 2011 her play The Painter on the life of J. M. W. Turner premiered at the Arcola Theatre to mark its move into new premises. Lenkiewicz's adaptation of Henry James' novella The Turn of the Screw was performed at London's Almeida Theatre (18 January – 16 March 2013). It was directed by Lindsay Posner

In 2014 Lenkiewicz wrote a short play, We Two Alone, inspired by King Lear and commissioned by RIFT Theatre for their Shakespeare in Shoreditch Festival. The production was directed by Tess Farley and Connor Abbott of Outbreak Theatre. Lenkiewicz's 2015 Jane Wenham: The Witch of Walkern concerned one of the last witch-hunts and trials in England, that of Jane Wenham, whose outsider status is juxtaposed with the lot of other women in the village, including the daughter of a woman executed for witchcraft, a former slave, and a widow trying to run the village taphouse on her own. Her play, The Invisible was directed by Michael Oakley at the Bush Theatre. It ran from 3 July - 15 August 2015.

Lenkiewicz's shorter works include a contribution to 24 Hour Plays (June 2005), Flowers in her Hair (March 2009), The Typist (June 2010), That Almost Unnameable Lust (Nov 2010). She translated Avec Norm (2004) by Serge Boucher, which was performed in a public reading at the Centre des Auteurs Dramatiques (31 July 2007).

=== Radio ===
She wrote numerous productions for BBC Radio, such as: Fighting for Words (2005), Caravan of Desire, Blue Moon over Poplar (both 2006), The Man in the Suit, Sarah and Ken, Betty Lives in a Little Yellow House in Texas (all 2010), Burning Up and The Phone (both 2011). She also wrote an adaptation of Dracula and The Winter House (2012), and a dramatisation of Anne Tyler's Dinner at the Homesick Restaurant (May 2013) and Ladder of Years.

=== Film and television ===
She co-wrote the Polish-language film Ida (2013) with Paweł Pawlikowski, its director. The film is set in Poland in the 1960s and is the story of what happens when a novitiate nun first learns that she is an orphan of Jewish parenthood. The first version of the screenplay was written in English by Lenkiewicz and Pawlikowski, when it had the working title Sister of Mercy. Pawlikowski then translated the screenplay into Polish and revised it. The screenplay for Ida won the European Screenwriter category at the 27th European Film Awards in 2014, and the Oscar for Best Foreign Film at the ceremony on 22 February 2015. She co-wrote, with director Sebastian Leilo, the script for the adaptation of Disobedience in 2017.

In 2018, she and collaborators Wash Westmoreland and Richard Glatzer wrote the screenplay for Colette. She wrote the screenplay for the 2022 film She Said.

In 2025, Lenkiewicz made her film directorial debut with Hot Milk, for which she also wrote the screenplay. The mother-daughter drama has an international cast including Emma Mackey, Fiona Shaw, Vicky Krieps, and Vincent Perez and is set in Spain. The film had its world premiere in February 2025 at the 75th Berlin International Film Festival and was shown in competition for the Golden Bear.

== Filmography ==
Film writer

- Ida (2013)
- Disobedience (2017)
- Colette (2018)
- Servants (2020)
- She Said (2022)
- Hot Milk (2025) (Also director)
- The Lost Children of Tuam (2026)

TV writer

Key
†	Denotes television productions that have not yet been released

Year	Title	Notes
2008–2010	Secret Diary of a Call Girl	3 episodes
2020	The Eddy	2 episodes (Story only)
2020	Small Axe	5 episodes (Lead writer)
TBA	The Portrait of a Lady †	

Co-executive producer

- The Woman in White (2018)

== Awards and honours ==
- The Critics' Circle Theatre Award for the most Promising Playwright 2004.
- Honorary degree by the University of Kent at Canterbury on 12 July 2012.
- Oscar for Best Foreign Language Film, the European Film Award and the Bafta in 2015 for Ida.
- Elected Fellow of the Royal Society of Literature in 2017.
