= Cathy Galvin =

English poet and journalist (born 1959)

- Born: 14 December 1959 (age 66); Coventry, England
- Education: University of Leeds; University of Warwick
- Occupations: Poet and journalist
- Writing career
- Notable awards: Hawthornden Fellowship; Heinrich Böll residency Arts Council England DYCP award

Cathy Galvin (born 14 December 1959) is an English poet and journalist. She has published three poetry collections and is co-founder of the Sunday Times Short Story Award. Her journalism has appeared in the Financial Times, The Daily Telegraph, Newsweek, The Sunday Times, and The Tablet, where she is a non-executive director. Her work includes interviews with notable British writers including Will Self, Hanif Kureishi, Carol Ann Duffy, and Sebastian Faulks.

Galvin is the founder and director of the Word Factory, a writing community and organisation described by The Guardian as "a national organisation supporting excellence in short fiction". She was the editor of Red, an anthology of new writing published by the bookseller Waterstones.

== Biography ==
Galvin was born in Coventry, England, on 14 December 1959 to parents from Ireland and Yorkshire. She obtained a BA (hons) degree in political studies from the University of Leeds in 1982. In 2015 she obtained an MA in writing from the University of Warwick, where she served as associate editor of the Warwick Review.

Galvin trained as a journalist on the Thomson Training Course in Newcastle-upon-Tyne and worked as reporter on the Hemel Hempstead Evening Post-Echo and the Cambridge Evening News. She later held a variety of senior writing and editing positions on UK publications including Today, the Daily Express, Newsweek, and The Sunday Times, where she served as News Review editor, deputy Magazine editor, and editor of the print and online Chronicle of the Future, whose contributors included Michio Kaku, Maureen Freely, James Murdoch, Marcus Chown, and Robert Winston, Baron Winston.

In 2009, she co-founded the Sunday Times Short Story Award with the former Faber and Faber managing director and chairman Matthew Evans. Her creation of the award led to her founding the Word Factory to promote excellence in short story writing. Word Factory participants have included the writers A. S. Byatt, Neil Gaiman, Tobias Wolff, A. L. Kennedy, Ben Okri, Michael Morpurgo, Deborah Levy, Marina Warner, Yiyun Li, Kevin Barry, David Constantine, Lionel Shriver, and Alexei Sayle.

Galvin has been a judge for various awards, including Ireland’s Frank O'Connor International Short Story Award (with Brigid Hughes and John F. Deane, the Edge Hill Short Story Prize, the Jerwood Fiction Uncovered Prize, the Word Factory Apprentice Award, and the Sunday Times Short Story Award.

Galvin is also a founder member of Women In Journalism, has served as a trustee of English PEN and Poet in the City, and is a patron of Visual Verse.

Galvin holds UK and Irish citizenship, and responded as a poet to the Haddon Dixon Repatriation Project to return skulls stolen by ethnologists in the 19th century to Irish west coast cemeteries; part of the resulting work was published in Poetry London (Spring Issue, 2022)). As a poet, she is the recipient of a Hawthornden Fellowship, a Heinrich Böll residency on Achill Island, and an Arts Council England DYCP award. Her poetry has been nominated twice for Ireland’s Listowel poetry prize. Her work has appeared in publications including the Morning Star, The London Magazine, Agenda, High Windows, and 14 Magazine.

David Morley, winner of the Ted Hughes Award, wrote of her work Black and Blue: “A crown of sonnets seems at first an intractable and even intimidating prospect. When a writer confidently inhabits its spaces the crown becomes an arena of grace. This is such a performance.” Alison Brackenbury wrote in P. N. Review of Galvin’s work Rough Translation that she “translates life into elemental cycles”, and Ian Pople wrote in the Manchester Review of Walking the Coventry Ring Road With Lady Godiva as “a technical tour-de-force combining the Latin Mass with the argot of two-tone”.

Galvin is a PhD candidate in the Department of English and Creative Writing at Goldsmiths, University of London. She lives in Cornwall.

== Bibliography ==
=== Poetry ===
- Black and Blue. The Melos Press. 2014. ISBN 9780955515736.
- Rough Translation. The Melos Press. 2016. ISBN 9780995517301.
- Walking the Coventry Ring Road with Lady Godiva. Guillemot Press. 2019.

=== Anthology poetry and short story contributions ===
- Letter To An Unknown Soldier: A New Kind of War Memorial. Edited by Neil Bartlett and Kate Pullinger. William Collins. 2015. ISBN 9780008127251.
- Cornish Short Stories: A Collection of Contemporary Cornish Writing. The History Press. 2018. ISBN 9780750983556.
- High Spirits: A Round of Drinking Stories. Valley Press. 2019. ISBN 9781912436323.
- The Book of Coventry: A City in Short Fiction. Comma Press. 2024. ISBN 9781912697939.

=== As editor ===
- The Guillemot Factory (featuring Adam Marek, Jessie Greengrass, Carys Davies, and David Constantine. 2018.
- Create: A journal of perspectives on the value of art and culture. Arts Council England. 2014. ISBN 9780728715493. (Commissioning editor.)
- Red: The Waterstones Anthology. Waterstones. 2012. ISBN 9781902603742.
- Chronicle of the Future. The Sunday Times. 2000.
- Fast Fiction (ebook). 4th Estate.

=== As curator ===
- The Tablet Literary Festival: Exploring the Catholic Imagination. 2015.
- Citizen: The New Story (Festival). 2017.
