= Edge Hill Short Story Prize =

British and Irish short story collection prize

- Country: United Kingdom, Republic of Ireland
- Presented by: Edge Hill University

The Edge Hill Short Story Prize is a short story prize awarded annually by Edge Hill University for the best short story collection published that year in the United Kingdom or Republic of Ireland.

== Background ==
The concept for the prize was developed by Professor Ailsa Cox following a 2006 short-story conference at Edge Hill. It is the only prize to recognize a single author, published short-story collection in the UK and the Republic of Ireland.

Entries must be written in English and published by a UK or Republic of Ireland based publishing company. Authors must be citizens or residents of the United Kingdom or the Republic of Ireland.

Until 2024, the prize had three categories: the main Edge Hill Short Story Prize for a short story collection, the Readers' Choice Award for a single story from one of the shortlisted collections, voted for by students of the university, and a prize for the best short story submitted by a student of the university.

From 2025, the Readers' Choice award was discontinued. The three prize categories became: the Edge Hill Short Story Prize of £10,000 for the best short story collection, the Debut Collection Prize of £1,000 for the best debut collection in the shortlist, and the PGR Creative Writing award of £500 for a story written by an Edge Hill student undertaking postgraduate research in creative writing.

Rodge Glass, previously senior lecturer in creative writing at Edge Hill, edited an anthology of selected stories from winners and shortlisted authors to celebrate the award's first ten years. Titled Head Land: 10 Years of the Edge Hill Short Story Prize, it was published in 2017.

== Judging ==
Each year, the judging panel consists of three individuals who are supporters of the short story through writing or the creative industries, or have connections with the university.

| Year | Judge 1 | Judge 2 | Judge 3 |
|---|---|---|---|
| 2007 | Andrew Cant | A.L. Kennedy | Ailsa Cox |
| 2008 | Hilary Mantel | Duncan Minshull | Professor Rhiannon Evans |
| 2009 | Claire Keegan | James Walton | Mark Flinn |
| 2010 | Chris Beckett | Katharine Fry | Professor Tanya Byron |
| 2011 | Jeremy Dyson | Stuart Maconie | Marcus Gipps |
| 2012 | Graham Mort | Suzi Feay | Professor Rhiannon Evans |
| 2013 | Lesley McDowell | Jim Lee | Sarah Hall |
| 2014 | Kevin Barry | Carys Bray | Katie Allen |
| 2015 | Chris Power | Rachel Trezise | Ailsa Cox |
| 2016 | Kirsty Gunn | Cathy Galvin | Billy Cowan |
| 2017 | Thomas Morris | Cathy Galvin | Rodge Glass |
| 2018 | Alice O'Keffee | Paul McVeigh | Daisy Johnson |
| 2019 | Elizabeth Baines | Tessa Hadley | Sam Jordison |
| 2020 | David Szalay | Sara Hunt | Zayneb Allak |
| 2021 | Shelley Day | Elise Dillsworth | Kim Wiltshire |
| 2022 | Kevin Barry | Arzu Tahsin | Sarah Schofield |
| 2023 | Saba Sams | Lucy Luck | Andrea Ashworth |
| 2024 | Bernie McGill | Sam Conaghan | Harriet Hirshman |

== Winners ==
Colm Toibin was the first winner of the Edge Hill Short Story Prize in 2007. His winning collection, Mothers and Sons, explores the family relationships of several individuals during significant times in their lives. The following year Claire Keegan won the prize with her collection entitled Walk the Blue Fields. The collection's stories illustrate the yearning of the human heart against the backdrop of a nation wrestling with its past. The 2009 prize was awarded to Chris Beckett for The Turing Test. This science fiction collection captures readers' attention with tales about robots, alien planets, genetic manipulation, virtual reality, and artificial intelligence. Jeremy Dyson won the 2010 prize for his third short story collection The Cranes that Build the Cranes. A compilation of ghoulish stories, The Cranes that Build the Cranes is full of black humour and dark stories that received significant praise from critics. In 2011 judges awarded the prize to Professor Graham Mort for his collection entitled Touch. The stories in Touch are set in a variety of backgrounds including Africa, France, and northern England, and they convey an understanding and respect of the natural world and human relationships. Sarah Hall's The Beautiful Indifference won the prize in 2012. The collection includes erotic and disarming stories that span across centuries and diverse landscapes, all emphasizing the importance of survivalism. Dark Lies the Island by Kevin Barry was awarded the prize in 2013. This collection explores the tragedies and comedies of everyday life, and includes moving tales of misspent love and crimes gone wrong. The 2014 prize was given to John Burnside for his collection entitled Something Like Happy. Stories in Something Like Happy are often set in coastal towns during the winter, and include tales of menace, violence, and hallucinations. The 2015 prize was awarded to Professor Kirsty Gunn for Infidelities. The collection centres on stories of infidelity and includes tales of lust, love, resentment, and regret.

| Year | Author | Short Story Collection |
|---|---|---|
| 2007 | Colm Toibin | Mothers and Sons |
| 2008 | Claire Keegan | Walk the Blue Fields |
| 2009 | Chris Beckett | The Turing Test |
| 2010 | Jeremy Dyson | The Cranes that Build the Cranes |
| 2011 | Graham Mort | Touch |
| 2012 | Sarah Hall | The Beautiful Indifference |
| 2013 | Kevin Barry | Dark Lies the Island |
| 2014 | John Burnside | Something Like Happy |
| 2015 | Kirsty Gunn | Infidelities |
| 2016 | Jessie Greengrass | An Account of the Decline Of The Great Auk, According To One Who Saw It |
| 2017 | Daisy Johnson | Fen |
| 2018 | Tessa Hadley | Bad Dreams |
| 2019 | David Szalay | Turbulence |
| 2020 | Shelley Day | What Are You Like |
| 2021 | Kevin Barry | That Old Country Music |
| 2022 | Saba Sams | Send Nudes |
| 2023 | Bernie McGill | This Train Is For |
| 2024 | Tessa Hadley | After the Funeral |

== Award ceremonies ==
Winning authors are announced and honoured at an award ceremony each year. Furthermore, Edge Hill University hosts a public reading, during which the prize recipient reads from the winning collection.

| Year | Award Ceremony Location |
|---|---|
| 2007 | Royal Exchange, Manchester |
| 2008 | The Bluecoat, Liverpool |
| 2009 | The Bluecoat, Liverpool |
| 2010 | Blackwell's Bookstore, London |
| 2011 | Blackwell's Bookstore, London |
| 2012 | Free Word Centre, London |
| 2013 | Waterstones Piccadilly, London |
| 2014 | Free Word Centre, London |
| 2015 | Free Word Centre, London |
| 2016 | Free Word Centre, London |
| 2017 | Waterstones Piccadilly, London |
| 2018 | Waterstones Piccadilly, London |
| 2019 | Waterstones Piccadilly, London |
| 2020 | Online during Covid lockdown |
| 2021 | Online during Covid lockdown |
| 2022 | London Review Bookshop, London |
| 2023 | London Review Bookshop, London |
| 2024 | London Review Bookshop, London |
