= Tom-Gallon Trust Award =

The ALCS Tom-Gallon Trust Award is an annual award of £1,000 for a short story, financed by a bequest made by Nellie Tom-Gallon in memory of her brother, playwright and novelist Tom Gallon (1866–1914). The story should be traditional, not experimental, in character. The ALCS Tom-Gallon Trust Award is generously supported by the Authors' Licensing and Collecting Society (ALCS) and is administered by the Society of Authors. Previous recipients include Man Booker Prize nominee Alison MacLeod, Simon van Booy and Claire Keegan.

== List of Award winners ==
=== 2020s ===
2025

- Winner: Katie Hale for ‘Raise, or How to Break Free of the Ground, or The Lakeland Dialect for Slippery is Slape and to Form it in the Mouth Requires an Act of Falling’
- Runner-up: Hamish Gray for ‘But the fire will spit again’

2024

- Winner: Alexandra Ye for ‘This Story’
- Runner-up: Edward Hogan for ‘Little Green Man’

2023

- Winner: Ciarán Folan for 'A Day'
- Runner-up: Karen Stevens for 'Among the Crows'

2023

- Winner: Ciarán Folan for 'A Day'
- Runner-up: Karen Stevens for 'Among the Crows'

2022

- Winner: Kanya D’Almeida for 'I Cleaned The—'
- Runner-up: Dean Gessie for 'Head Smashed in Buffalo Jump'

2021

- Winner: DM O'Connor for "I Told You not to Fly so High"
- Runner-up: Sean Lusk for "The Hopelessness of Hope"

2020

- Winner: Wendy Riley for "Eva at the End of the World"
- Runner-up: Diana Powell for "Whale Watching"

=== 2010s ===
2019

- Winner: Dima Alzayat for "Once We Were Syrians"
- Runner-up: Bunmi Ogunsiji for "Blessing"

2018

- Winner: Chris Connolly for |"The Speed of Light and How it Cannot Help Us"
- Runner-up: Benjamin Myers for "A Thousand Acres of English Soil"

2017

- Winner: Frances Thimann for "Shells"
- Runner-up: Becky Tipper for "The Rabbit"

2016

- Winner: Claire Harman for "Otherwise Engaged"
- Runner-up: Jessie Greengrass for "Dolphin"

2015

- Winner: Maria C. McCarthy for "More Katharine Than Audrey"
- Runner-up: Caroline Price for "Vin Rouge"

2014

- Winner: Benjamin Myers for "The Folk Song Singer"
- Runner-up: Claire Harman for "Poor Maggie Kirkpatrick"

2013

- Winner: Samuel Wright for "Best Friend"
- Runner-up: Lucy Wood for "Wisht"

2011

- Emma Timpany for "The Pledge"
- Runner-up: Miriam Burke for "A Splash of Words"

2010

- Winner: Carys Davies for "The Quiet"
- Runners-up: Susannah Rickards for "The Paperback Macbeth" and Simon Van Booy for "Little Birds"

=== 2000s ===
2009

- Winner: Rosemary Mairs for "My Father's Hands"
- Runner-up: Huw Lawrence for "Keeping On"

2008

- Alison MacLeod for "Dirty Weekend"

2007

- Claire Keegan for "The Parting Gift"

2006

- Bethan Roberts for "An Elephant in the Thames"

2005

- Colette Paul for "O Tell me the Truth About Love"

2004

- Claire Keegan for "Men and Women"

2003

- Judith Ravenscroft for "As She Waited for Spring"

2001

- Paul Blaney for "Apple Tennis"

=== 1990s ===
1999

- Grace Ingoldby for "The Notion of Deuce"

1996

- Leo Madigan for "Packing for Wednesday"

1994

- Janice Fox for "A Good Place to Die"

1992

- David Callard for "Reading the Signals"

1990

- Richard Austin for "Sister Monica's Last Journey"

=== 1980s ===
1988

- Alan Beard for "Taking Doreen Out of the Sky"

1986

- Lawrence Scott for "The House of Funerals"

1984

- Janni Howker for "The Egg Man"

1982

- Dermot Healy for "The Tenant"

1980

- Alan McConnell for "The Comrades Marathon"

=== 1970s ===
1978

- Michael Morrissey for "An Evening with Ionesco"

1976

- Jackson Webb for "Vassili"

1974

- Neilson Graham for "Anscombe"

1972

- Kathleen Julian for "Catch Two"

1970

- A. Craig Bell for "The Nest / Aileen Pennington The Princess and the Pussy-cat"

=== 1960s ===
1966

- Gillian Edwards for "An Evening in September"

1964

- Peter Greave for "The Wonderful Day / Jean Stubbs A Child's Four Seasons"

=== 1950s ===
1959

- Harold Elvin for "God's Right Hand Upon My Shoulder"

1957

- E. W. Hildick for "A Casual Visit"

1955

- Robert Roberts for "Conducted Tour"

1953

- Maurice Cranston for "A Visit to the Author"

1951

- Fred Urquhart for "The Ploughing Match"

=== 1940s ===
1949

- Olivia Manning for "The Children"

1947

- Dorothy K. Haynes for "The Head"

1945

- Jack Aistrop for "Death in the Midst of What"

1943

- Elizabeth Myers for "A Well Full of Leaves"
