= Riptide (disambiguation) =

Rip tide is a strong tidal flow of water within estuaries and other enclosed tidal areas.

Riptide or rip tide may also refer to:

- A common misnomer for a rip current, a fast narrow current running offshore and cutting through breaking waves

== Amusement rides ==
- Riptide (Canada's Wonderland), a Top Spin ride
- Riptide, a pirate ship ride at Morey's Piers
- Rip Tide, a Top Spin ride at Knott's Berry Farm

== Books ==
- Riptide (book series), short story anthologies
- Riptide (novel), by Douglas Preston and Lincoln Child, 1998
- Riptide, a novel by Catherine Coulter, 2000
- Riptide, a novel by Cherry Adair, 2011
- Riptide, a Star Wars novel by Paul S. Kemp, 2011
- Rip Tide, a novel in verse by William Rose Benét, 1932
- Rip Tide, a novel by Sam Llewellyn, 1992
- Rip Tide (novella), a Doctor Who novella by Louise Cooper, 2003
- Rip Tide, a novel by Kat Falls, 2011
- Rip Tide, a novel by Stella Rimington, 2011

== Comics ==
- Riptide (Marvel Comics), a character in the Marvel universe
- Riptide (Youngblood), a character in the Image and Awesome Comics universes

== Films and television ==
=== Films ===
- Rip Tide (film), 2017 Australian film
- Riptide (1934 film), by Edmund Goulding
- Riptide (2013 film) (aka Ressac), a Canadian drama film by Pascale Ferland
- Riptide (2016 film), an Australian short film starring George Pullar

=== TV ===
- Riptide (2022 TV series), 2022 Australian drama miniseries
- Riptide (American TV series), 1984–1986 American detective series
- Riptide (Australian TV series), 1969 Australian drama series starring Ty Hardin

== Music ==
- The Riptides, Australian power pop group formed in 1977
- Riptide (album), 1985 album by Robert Palmer, or its title track
- The Rip Tide, 2011 album by Beirut
- "Riptide" (Sick Puppies song), 2011
- "Riptide" (Vance Joy song), 2013
- "Riptide" (The Chainsmokers song), 2022
- "Riptide", a 2022 single by Beartooth
- "Riptide", a 2024 single by South Arcade
- "Riptide", a 2020 single by Grandson from Death of an Optimist
- Rip Tide, background music in SpongeBob SquarePants

== Sport ==
- Central Jersey Riptide, a defunct soccer team from Clark, New Jersey
- Los Angeles Riptide, a defunct outdoor lacrosse team from Carson, California
- New England Riptide, a defunct women's softball team from Lowell, Massachusetts
- New York Riptide, a box lacrosse team from Uniondale, New York
- Oregon Riptide, a defunct basketball team in Portland, Oregon
- San Diego Riptide, a defunct football team in San Diego, California
- Riptide, ringname of American professional wrestler Angel Orsini
- Riptide, a finisher move of the professional wrestler Rhea Ripley

== Other ==
- Dead Island: Riptide, a 2013 video game
- Riptide ("Anaklusmos"), Percy Jackson's sword in Percy Jackson & the Olympians
- Riptide Publishing, a publisher of LGBTQ fiction; see Bisexual literature § Riptide Publishing
