= Dark Lies the Island (film) =

2019 Irish drama film

- Release poster
- Directed by: Ian Fitzgibbon
- Written by: Kevin Barry
- Produced by: Michael Garland; Catherine Magee
- Starring: Peter Coonan; Charlie Murphy; Moe Dunford; Pat Shortt; Tommy Tiernan
- Cinematography: Cathal Watters
- Edited by: Stephen O'Connell
- Music by: Stephen Rennicks
- Release date: February 27, 2019 (Dublin Film Festival)
- Country: Ireland

Dark Lies the Island is a 2019 Irish drama film directed by Ian Fitzgibbon from a screenplay adapted by Kevin Barry from his short story of the same name. It stars Peter Coonan, Charlie Murphy, Moe Dunford, Pat Shortt and Tommy Tiernan. It was produced by Grand Pictures. It premiered at the Dublin Film Festival on February 27, 2019, and went on general release in Ireland and the United Kingdom on October 18 of that year.

== Cast ==
- Peter Coonan as Doggy Mannion
- Charlie Murphy as Sarah Mannion
- Moe Dunford as Martin Mannion
- Pat Shortt as Daddy Mannion
- Tommy Tiernan as Richie Tobin

== Reception ==
On Rotten Tomatoes it has a score of 67% based on reviews from 6 critics.

In a review for The Irish Times, critic Donald Clarke praised the cast and cinematographer Cathal Watters but concluded "this impressive work fails to impose order on a too-busy melodrama that flails in a hundred directions without locating enough forward momentum." Chris Wasser of Irish Independent characterised it as an Irish Fargo and judged it a "nasty, tone-deaf, diddley-eye disaster". RTÉ's TV editor John Byrne in a 4-star review praised Coonan's "manic fervor" and Murphy's "Veronica Lake-like ice queen quality".
