= Graham Mort =

British writer, editor, & tutor

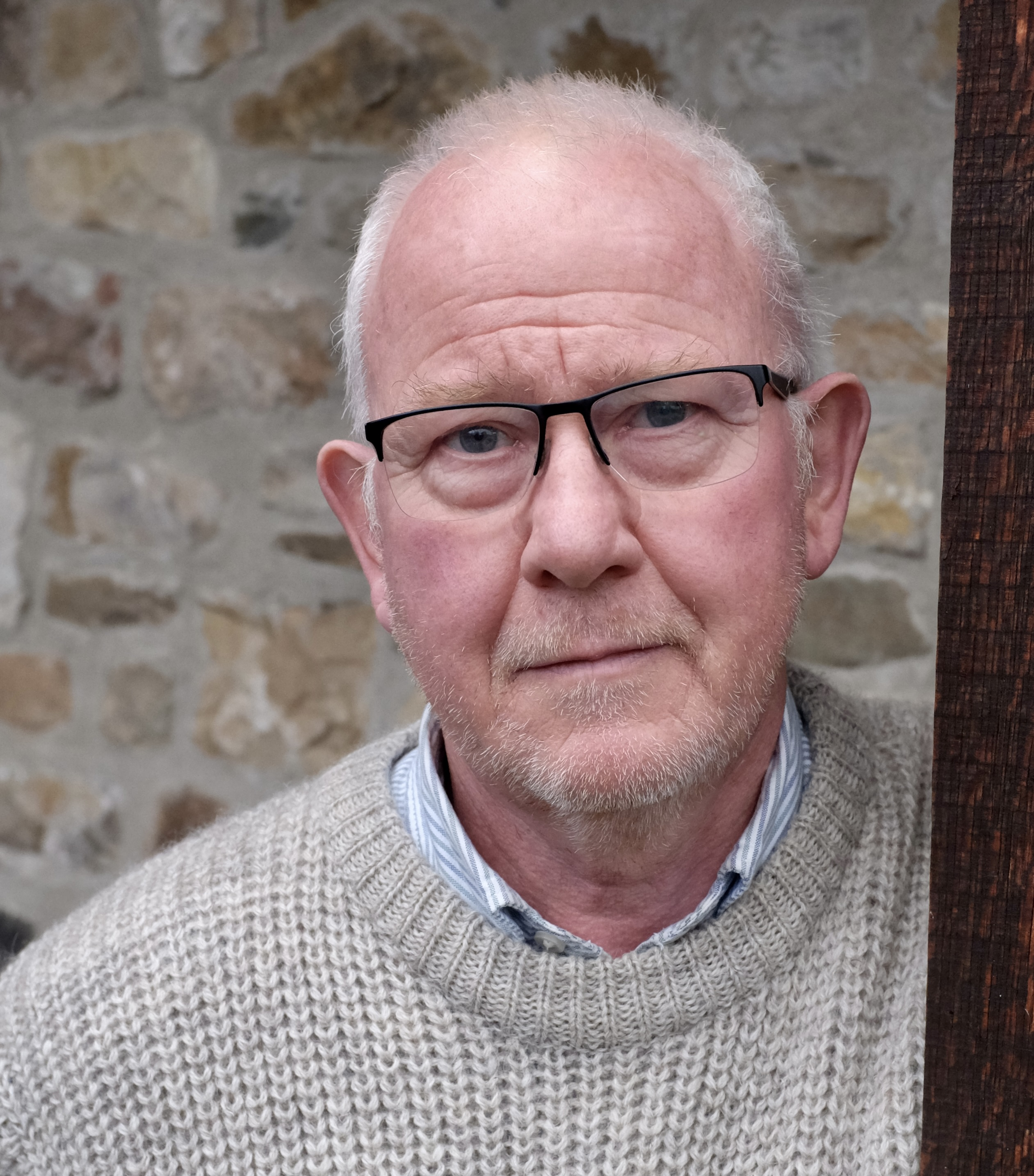
Graham Mort

Graham Mort is a British writer, editor and tutor, who "is acknowledged as one of contemporary verse's most accomplished practitioners". He is the author of ten volumes of poetry and three volumes of short fiction and has written radio drama for BBC Radio 4, and won both the Bridport Prize and the Edge Hill Prize for short fiction.

His poetry collection Visibility: New and Selected Poems, was published by Seren in 2007. The Guardian Review of Books comments that it "perfectly exhibits the blend of formal scrupulousness, sensory evocation and intellectual rigour that has shaped his reputation".

He received a major Eric Gregory award from the Society of Authors for his first collection of poems, A Country on Fire, and Circular Breathing was a Poetry Book Society recommendation.

Graham won the 2007 Bridport International Short Story Prize, for his story "The Prince". His first collection of short fiction, Touch, was published by Seren in 2010 and won the Edge Hill Prize in 2011.

== Biography ==
Graham was born in Lancashire and studied English at Liverpool University. He worked as a mill labourer, dairy operative and psychiatric nurse before training as a teacher. He taught in schools, colleges, prisons, special education and psychiatric units before becoming a freelance writer. He gained a doctorate from the University of Glamorgan and is a Distance Learning and eLearning specialist. He has been the Director of Studies for the Open College of the Arts and is now Emeritus Professor of Creative Writing and Transcultural Literature at Lancaster University, where his academic research ranges from contemporary fiction and poetry and emergent African writing and narratives of diaspora to eLearning and literature development project design. In 2014, he was appointed as a National teaching Fellow. From October 2016, he was appointed an Extraordinary Professor at the University of the Western Cape, South Africa. He has also worked in Kurdistan and visited poetry festivals and translation projects in China and Vietnam.

== Crossing Borders ==
In 2001, Graham designed and led the Crossing Borders scheme. The project was piloted in Uganda in 2001. By 2003, the project had developed into a major British Council/Lancaster University partnership involving Uganda, Kenya, Zambia, Zimbabwe, Cameroon, Nigeria, Ghana, South Africa and Malawi.

Crossing Borders employed a team of 25 writing mentors throughout the UK and reached more than 300 African writers, bringing a budget of £375,000 to the University for this Third Mission activity. The Beyond Borders pan-African literature festival in Uganda in October 2005 involved writers from the UK and 17 African countries.

The mentoring project was laid down in April 2006, but the website remains active and publishes a quarterly online magazine of new African writing. Recent achievements for Crossing Borders participants include Monica Arac de Nyeko of Uganda winning the Caine Prize for African Writing 2007 and Ellen Banda-Aaku, Zambia, winning the Commonwealth Short Story Competition.

== Radiophonics ==
Graham devised Radiophonics as legacy activity to Crossing Borders. It was piloted in Uganda in autumn 2006, when 8 Crossing Borders writers took part in workshop and online mentoring to produce short stories for radio.

The stories focused on topical themes and were broadcast on Sanyu FM (Kampala) as the Under the Sun series with live audience reaction to the stories. Graham Mort devised and produced the series with Faith Kinani of Sanyu FM. Kate Horsley was the project researcher and also designed online support systems.

Each whole programme was mounted on the Crossing Borders site as podcasts intended to reach a global audience. Radiophonics has now been commissioned as a major project in Nigeria and Uganda, commencing in September 2007.

== Centre for Transcultural Writing and Research ==
Graham is the director of Centre for Transcultural Writing and Research (CTWR) which was launched at Lancaster University in 2007 in order to create a transnational and interdisciplinary environment that will promote the study of creative writing across cultures. The Centre brings together a number of intercultural research projects: Crossing Borders, Moving Manchester, Radiophonics and Trans-Scriptions.

== Bibliography ==
Poetry

- Samara, 4Word Press, 2021
- Black Shiver Moss, Seren, 2017
- Cusp, Seren 2011
- Visibility, Seren, 2007
- A Night On The Lash, Seren, 2004
- Circular Breathing, Dangaroo Press, 1997
- Snow From The North, Dangaroo Press, 1992
- Sky Burial, Dangaroo Press, 1989
- Into The Ashes, Littlewood Press, 1988
- A Halifax Cider Jar, Yorkshire Art Circus, 1987
- A Country On Fire, Littlewood Press, 1986

Fiction

- Terroir, Seren, 2015
- Touch, Seren, 2010
- Like Fado & Other Stories Salt, 2021

Radio Drama

- Cuba Libre at the Café España (afternoon play) BBC Radio 4, 2002
- The Life Of The Bee (dramatic adaptation) BBC Radio 4, 1999
- The Red Field (long poem) BBC Radio 4,1997
- Flymowing (dramatised poem) BBC Radio 3, 1997

Educational Coursebooks

- Storylines, Open College of the Arts, 1992
- The Experience Of Poetry, Open College of the Arts, 1991
- Starting To Write, Open College of The Arts, 1990

Short Fiction published in Northern Short Stories (Littlewood Press), Northern Short Stories (Arc Publications), Riptide Journal, London Magazine, Bright Streets Dark Comers (Unwin Hyman), BBC Radio 3, The Guardian, Critical Quarterly, Krax, Global Tapestry, Fisheye, The North, Panurge, Metropolitan, BBC Radio Lancashire, BBC Radio North-West, Fish Publishing Short Story Anthology.

Articles, academic papers and reviews have been published in a wide range of literary journals.
