= Tessa Hadley =

British author (born 1956)

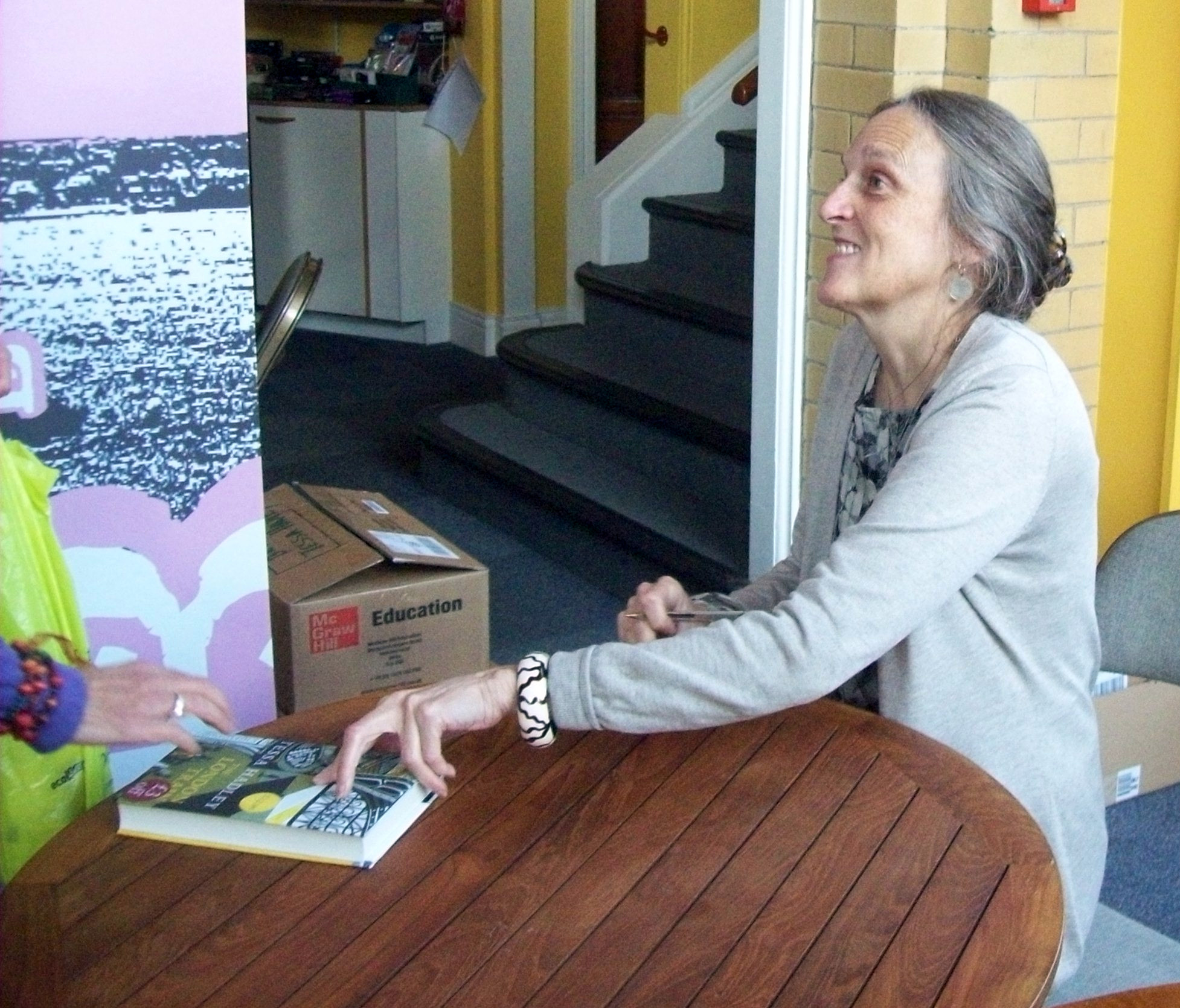
- Hadley in 2011
- Born: Tessa Jane Nichols; 28 February 1956 (age 70); Bristol, England
- Education: Clare College, Cambridge (BA); Bath Spa University (MA); University of the West of England (PhD)
- Occupation: Writer
- Spouse: Eric Hadley
- Children: 3
- Writing career
- Language: English
- Years active: 1983–present
- Genres: Novels; short fiction; nonfiction

Tessa Jane Hadley FRSL (born 28 February 1956; née Nichols) is a British author, who writes novels, short stories and nonfiction. Her writing is realistic and often focuses on family relationships. Her novels have twice reached the longlists of the Orange Prize and the Wales Book of the Year, and in 2016 she won the Hawthornden Prize, as well as one of the Windham-Campbell Literature Prizes for fiction. The Windham-Campbell judges describe her as "one of English's finest contemporary writers" and state that her writing "brilliantly illuminates ordinary lives with extraordinary prose that is superbly controlled, psychologically acute, and subtly powerful." As of 2016, she is professor of creative writing at Bath Spa University.

== Biography ==
Tessa Hadley was born in Bristol, England, in 1956. Her father Geoff Nichols was a teacher and an amateur jazz trumpeter, and her mother Mary was an amateur artist. Her father's brother is the playwright Peter Nichols. She gained a BA in English (1978) followed by a PGCE at Clare College, Cambridge, and briefly taught at a comprehensive school before starting a family. In 1982 she married Eric Hadley, a teacher, lecturer and playwright, and they moved to Cardiff, where Eric Hadley taught at Cardiff University and the University of Wales Institute. The couple have three sons together, as well as three stepsons. During this period, Hadley completed several novels but failed to find a publisher, and also co-authored two collections of short stories for children with her husband.

In 1993, when she was in her late thirties, Hadley studied for an MA in creative writing at Bath Spa University College, which she was awarded in 1994, and gained a PhD at the University of the West of England in 1998; her PhD thesis is entitled "Pleasure and propriety in Henry James". She started to teach creative writing at Bath Spa University in 1997; as of 2016, she is professor of creative writing at the university. Her first published novel, Accidents in the Home, written while bringing up her family, appeared in 2002 when she was 46. Her continued study of the author Henry James has resulted in a book, as well as several research and conference papers. She researches and teaches on James and Jane Austen, as well as early 20th century novelists and short-story writers, especially women, including Elizabeth Bowen, Katherine Mansfield and Jean Rhys.

She was elected a Fellow of the Royal Society of Literature in 2009 and is also a Fellow of The Welsh Academy. She is the chair of the New Welsh Review's editorial board. She has served as a judge for the International Dublin Literary Award (2011), BBC National Short Story Award (2011), O. Henry Prize for short stories (2015) and the Wellcome Book Prize (2016).

== Fiction ==
As of 2022, Hadley has published eight novels, as well as three short-story collections for adults and (with Eric Hadley) two for children. Her novels are realistic, set in Britain between 1950 and the present day, often in cities outside London, and feature comfortably middle-class characters, with a focus on women. They often concentrate on family relationships, "the intricate tangle of marriage, divorce, lovers, close friends, children and stepchildren – the web people create for themselves." They are frequently praised for their prose style as well as their psychological insight; the judges of the Windham–Campbell Prize, which she won in 2016, state that her writing "brilliantly illuminates ordinary lives with extraordinary prose that is superbly controlled, psychologically acute, and subtly powerful." Hadley has described plot or story as "part of the miracle of people and lives ... the abrupt swerves and changes that life produces," and some reviewers have criticised her novels for a lack of plot. The author Anne Enright compares Hadley's short stories to those of Alice Munro, calling them "two writers who would rather be wise than nice. They both write long, realistic short stories that are disrupted by sex and interested in time; both are fascinated by the road not taken. Each draws from a personal store, writing and rewriting variations of the same recurrent themes."

=== Accidents in the Home ===
Her first novel, Accidents in the Home (2002), juxtaposes married motherhood with a glamorous London modelling career, and handles themes including adultery. The author Julie Myerson, writing in The Guardian, describes it as a "fantastically subtle, absorbing and insightful novel" masquerading as "chick-mum-sex-lit." Maria Russo, in a review for The New York Times, calls it "surprising and rewarding" and highlights its "intense, concentrated prose style." The novel employs multiple points of view in addition to the protagonist, giving the feel of interwoven short stories, and making the novel "a panorama of a contemporary kind of family life."

=== Everything Will Be All Right ===
Hadley has stated that she incorporated some material from her mother's life in her second novel, Everything Will Be All Right (2003), which documents women's roles over the previous fifty years in its description of four generations of one family. The author Joanna Briscoe, in a review for The Guardian, describes the novel as a "virtually plotless portrait of a series of breathtakingly ordinary mortals, which tackles few large themes and lacks the satisfaction of any real narrative arc" and yet is "mysteriously, bewitchingly compelling." The author Stevie Davies, in a review for The Independent, states that "Hadley reminds us of the remorselessness of time and the replaceability of selves;" she calls the novel "intriguing, complex and irritating" and praises its metaphorical use of historical detail.

=== The Master Bedroom ===
The Master Bedroom (2007) focuses on a single character, a female academic in her mid-forties who leaves London to look after her elderly mother in Wales and finds herself sexually pursued by a teenager and his father. The novel explores early middle age, as well as the impact of mental deterioration. Liesl Schillinger, in a review for The New York Times, describes it as "a chess game of slow-burn erotic maneuvers that produce tantalizingly unpredictable outcomes." Briscoe, writing in The Guardian, highlights the novel's "stylistic and observational brilliance," but criticises Hadley for "refus[ing] to let dramatic action, an escalation of tension, or any other conventional narrative lubricant dictate the rhythms of everyday life," considering that "she exercises such restraint that her brilliance is ultimately muted."

=== The London Train ===
The London Train (2011) is a structured novel with two parallel narratives focusing on separate characters whose links are eventually revealed. Its themes include class differences, family relationships, infidelity and recovery from parental bereavement. Hadley has stated that she conceived the two sections separately. Helen Brown, in a review for The Daily Telegraph, praises the novel's "elegant symmetry" and states that "it offers some first-class views on the psychological scenery of 21st-century Britain." The author Jean Thompson, writing for The New York Times, considers that the emphasis on the characters' thoughts might "muffle plot momentum" and challenges Hadley to "take a further step into the imaginative and transformational, into life that is not merely true but riveting and magical."

=== Clever Girl ===
Clever Girl (2013), a first-person account of the life of a woman of fifty, "revives a very old genre, the female picaresque," exemplified by Daniel Defoe's Moll Flanders, but Claire Lowdon, in a review for the New Statesman, criticises it for lacking that novel's humour. The literary critic Elaine Showalter describes the novel's structure as a series of short stories – three chapters were published in The New Yorker in that form – and considers "the whole is less than the sum of the parts." James Kidd, writing in The Independent, states that it "slowly coalesces to form a mosaic of British life over the past 50 years."

=== The Past ===
The three-part structure of Hadley's novel, The Past (2015), mirrors Elizabeth Bowen's 1935 novel The House in Paris, with the central section set in the past. It features four middle-aged siblings (Alice, Harriet, Fran and Roland) holidaying together at their rural childhood home, and explores sexual desire. The Windham–Campbell judges describe the novel as having a "Chekhovian darkness: layers upon layers of secrets and strains that Hadley slowly, painstakingly excavates."

== Nonfiction ==
Her critical study Henry James and the Imagination of Pleasure (2002) discusses heterosexual love in his works, arguing that James shows an increasing appreciation for sensuality in his later novels, particularly The Ambassadors, The Golden Bowl and The Wings of the Dove. The academic Christopher Stuart describes the book as having "a rare combination of clarity and complexity" and praises it for putting James's work into the context of both the Anglo-American and continental traditions; he also highlights the "very sensitive, and frequently brilliant, textual analysis" and the "sharp, accessible, witty prose". The academic Phyllis Van Slyck calls the book "a sensitive and beautifully crafted reading" of the meaning of pleasure in James's fiction, describing the writing as "often eloquent," but considers that Hadley should have explained more clearly how her work relates to earlier research on the topic.

== Awards and honours ==
- Guardian First Book Award longlist for Accidents in the Home (2002)
- Encore Award shortlist for Everything Will Be All Right (2005)
- O. Henry Prize for "The Card Trick" (2005)
- Frank O'Connor International Short Story Award longlist for Sunstroke and Other Stories (2007)
- The Story Prize shortlist for Sunstroke and Other Stories (2007)
- Orange Prize longlist for The Master Bedroom (2008)
- Wales Book of the Year longlist for The Master Bedroom (2008)
- Fellow of the Royal Society of Literature (2009)
- Orange Prize longlist for The London Train (2011)
- Frank O'Connor International Short Story Award longlist for Married Love
- Edge Hill Short Story Prize shortlist for Married Love (2012)
- Wales Book of the Year longlist for Clever Girl (2014)
- O. Henry Prize for "Valentine" (2014)
- BBC National Short Story Award shortlist for Bad Dreams (2014)
- Windham–Campbell Literature Prize for fiction (2016)
- Edge Hill Short Story Prize (2018) for Bad Dreams

== Bibliography ==
=== Novels ===
- Accidents in the Home. New York: Henry Holt. 2002.
- Everything Will Be All Right (2003)
- The Master Bedroom (2007)
- The London Train (2011)
- Clever Girl (2013)
- The Past (2015)
- Late in the Day (2019)
- Free Love (2022)
- The Party (2024)

=== Short fiction ===
Collections

- Legends of the Sun and Moon (1983), with Eric Hadley
- Legends of Earth, Air, Fire and Water (1985), with Eric Hadley
- Sunstroke and Other Stories (2007)
- Married Love and Other Stories (2013)
- Bad Dreams and Other Stories (2017)
- After the Funeral (2023)

List of stories

Title	Year	First published	Reprinted/collected	Notes
"One Saturday Morning"	2014	"One Saturday Morning". The New Yorker. 90 (24): 58–63. 25 August 2014.	Bad Dreams and Other Stories	
"Dido's Lament"	2016	"Dido's Lament". The New Yorker. 92 (24): 62–67. 8–15 August 2016.	After the Funeral	
"Funny Little Snake"	2017	"Funny Little Snake". The New Yorker. 93 (32): 66–75. 16 October 2017.	After the Funeral	
"Cecilia Awakened"	2018	"Cecilia Awakened". The New Yorker. 94 (28): 48–53. 17 September 2018.	After the Funeral	

"The Quiet House" 2026 Author=Hadley, Tessa date= February 2, 2026 journal=The New Yorker [volume=CI, no.46, pages 51–56 www.newyorker.com/magazine/2026/2/2.

=== Nonfiction ===
- Henry James and the Imagination of Pleasure (2002)

== Personal life ==
Hadley lives in Cardiff, Wales, United Kingdom.
