= Fred Urquhart (writer) =

Scottish writer (1912–1995)

- Born: Frederick Burrows Urquhart; 12 July 1912; Edinburgh, Scotland
- Died: 2 December 1995 (aged 83); Haddington, East Lothian, Scotland
- Occupations: writer, reviewer, editor
- Partner: Peter Wyndham Allen
- Writing career
- Genre: Short Story
- Notable awards: Tom-Gallon Trust Award

Fred Urquhart or Frederick Burrows Urquhart (12 July 1912 – 2 December 1995) was a Scottish short story writer, novelist, editor and reviewer. He is considered Scotland's leading short story writer of the 20th century. Writing in the Manchester Evening News in November 1944, George Orwell praised Urquhart's "remarkable gift for constructing neat stories with convincing dialogue."

== Early life ==
Urquhart was born in Edinburgh. His father was chauffeur to wealthy Scottish families, including the Marquess of Breadalbane at Taymouth Castle. He spent much of his childhood in Fife, Perthshire and Wigtownshire. He attended village schools, followed by Stranraer High School and Broughton Secondary School.

On leaving school at the age of fifteen, he worked in a bookshop from 1927 to 1934. Because he was a pacifist and conscientious objector, during World War II, he worked on the land at Laurencekirk in the Mearns and later at Woburn Abbey. On visits to London, where he later lived, he met George Orwell and the Scottish painters Robert Colquhoun and Robert MacBryde.

== Career ==
=== Writer ===
In 1936, Urquhart published his first short story, followed by his first novel Time Will Knit in 1938. He went on to publish four novels and more eight volumes of short stories. The novel Jezebel's Dust (1951) is considered one of his best works. Many of his stories were read on the radio. Palace of Green Days was a Book at Bedtime in 1985.

Many of his stories revolved around rural life, set in the fictional town of Auchencairn in the Mearns countryside south of Aberdeen. The theme of many of these stories was a desire to escape the drudgery of every-day working-class life. One of these stories, "The Ploughing Match," won the Tom–Gallon Trust Award for 1951.

He also wrote many stories about violence against women and was known for the way he sensitively portrayed women. Compton Mackenzie said Urquhart had a "remarkable talent for depicting women young and old." "We Never Died in Winter" is considered a good example of one of his stories about working-class girls.

In the 1960s, he published several volumes of short stories with historical and supernatural themes. One obituarist said, "His skill was to show characters in everyday, conversational action".

=== Publishing ===
Starting in 1947, Urquhart worked as a reader for a literary agency in London until 1951., From 1951 to 1954 he read scripts for Metro–Goldwyn–Mayer. From 1951 to 1974 he was a reader for Cassell and Company in London. He was a London scout for Walt Disney Productions from 1959 to 1960. From 1967 to 1971, he was a reader for J. M. Dent and Sons in London.

He had a particular love of horses and edited illustrated anthology The Book of Horses in 1981. He also edited a number of books and wrote reviews for magazines and newspapers.

== Awards ==
- Tom–Gallon Trust Award, for "The Ploughing Match," 1951
- Arts Council of Great Britain grant, 1966
- Arts Council of Great Britain bursary, 1978
- Scottish Arts Council grant, 1975
- Arts Council of Great Britain bursary, 1985

== Personal life ==
Urquhart was homosexual. He moved to Ashdown Forest in East Sussex in 1958 with his companion, the dancer Peter Wyndham Allen, but when Wyndham Allen died in 1990 Urquhart moved back to Scotland. He was a friend of Rhys Davies, with whom he shared a cottage in Tring in 1946, and of Norah Hoult.

Urquhart died in Haddington, East Lothian at the age of 83.

== Selected bibliography ==
=== Novels ===
- Time Will Knit (Duckworth, 1938)
- The Ferret was Abraham's Daughter (Methuen, 1949)
- Jezebel's Dust (Methuen,1951)
- Palace of Green Days (Quartet Books, 1979) ISBN 9780704322172

=== Short story collections ===
- I Fell for a Sailor (Duckworth, 1940; Kennedy & Boyd, 2011)
- Selected Stories ( Maurice Fridberg, 1946)
- The Clouds are Big with Mercy (William MacLellan, 1946; Kennedy & Boyd, 2011)
- The Last GI Bride Wore Tartan (Serif Books of Edinburgh, 1947; Kennedy & Boyd, 2022)
- The Year of the Short Corn and Other Stories (Methuen & Co. Ltd., 1949; Kennedy & Boyd, 2013)
- The Last Sister (Methuen, 1950)
- The Laundry Girl and the Pole (Arco, 1955)
- Dying Stallion: The Collected Stories, Vol. 1 (Rupert Hart-Davis, 1967)
- The Ploughing Match: The Collected Stories, Vol. 2 (Rupert Hart-Davis,1968)
- Proud Lady in a Cage (Paul Harris Publishing, 1980) ISBN 9780904505900
- Seven Ghosts in Search (Kimber / HarperCollins Distribution, 1983; Kennedy & Boyd, 2014) ISBN 9780718305017
- A Diver in China Seas (Quartet Books, 1980; Kennedy & Boyd, 2017) ISBN 9780704322554
- Full Score: Short Stories (Aberdeen University Press, 1989) ISBN 9780080377193
- A Goal for Miss Valentino (Kennedy & Boyd, 2014) ISBN 9781849211116

=== Writings in anthologies ===
- The Unlikely Ghosts (Mayflower Books, 1969) ISBN 9780583116183
- Ten Modern Scottish Stories. Robert Millar, ed. (Heinemann Educational Books, 1973) ISBN 9780435135454
- Scottish Short Stories 1974. (Harper Collins, 1974). ISBN 9780002218917
- Further Modern Scottish Stories. Robert Millar and John Thomas Low, editors. (Heinemann Educational Books, 1976) ISBN 0435135406
- Scottish Ghost Stories. Giles Gordon, ed. (Lomond Books, 1976)
- As I Remember: Ten Scottish Authors recall How Writing Began for Them. Maurice Lindsay, ed. (Robert Hale & Company, 1979) ISBN 9780709173212
- "Lillie Langtry’s Silver Cup". The Fourth Book of After Midnight Stories ( William Kimber & Co Ltd, 1988) ISBN 9780718307028
- "Introduction," Creepy Stories (Bracken Books, 1994) ISBN 9781858911366

=== Writings in magazines ===
- "Cristopher Rush: Peace Comes Dropping Slow." The Scottish Review of Books, no. 31, 1983
- "Cooee' Cried the Parrot" Cencrastus, no. 44, 1993.

=== Compiler or editor ===
- No Scottish Twilight: New Scottish Stories. (William Maclellan, 1947)
- W.S.C. A Cartoon Biography (Cassell & Company, 1955) ISBN 9780947782757
- Great True War Adventures. (Arco Publishers, 1956) ISBN 9780970822710
- Great True Escape Stories. (Weidenfeld and Nicolson, 1958).
- The Cassell Miscellany 1848-1958. (Cassell, 1958).
- Freeman, William. Dictionary of Fictional Characters. Revised by Fred Urquhart. (The Writer, Inc., 1974) ISBN 9780871160850
- Modern Scottish Short Stories (Faber & Faber, 1978) ISBN 9780571119530
- The Book of Horses (1981) ISBN 9780436549359
