= Laura van den Berg =

American fiction writer (born 1983)

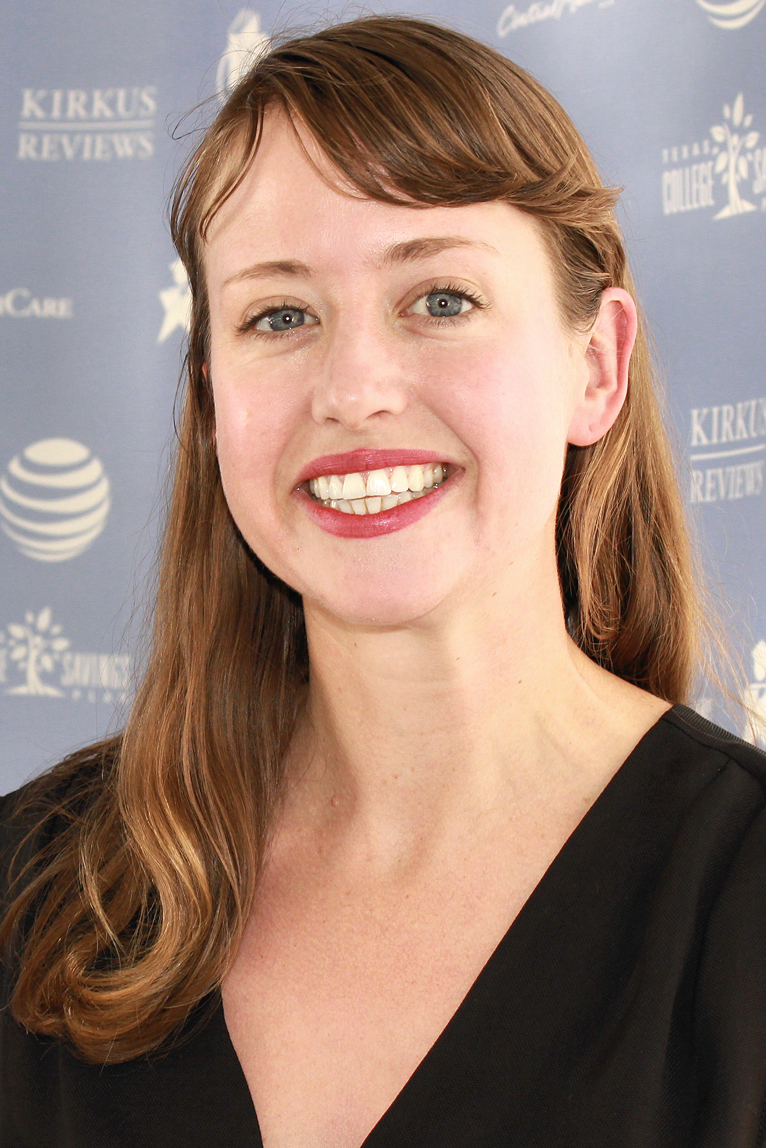
- van den Berg (2015)
- Born: May 31, 1983 (age 43); Florida, U.S.
- Education: Rollins College (BA); Emerson College (MFA)
- Occupation: Author
- Spouse: Paul Yoon
- Writing career
- Genre: Fiction
- Website: lauravandenberg.com

Laura van den Berg (born May 31, 1983) is an American fiction writer. She is the author of five works of fiction. Her first two collections of short stories were each shortlisted for the Frank O'Connor International Short Story Award, in 2010 and 2014. In 2021, she was awarded the Strauss Livings Award from the American Academy of Arts & Letters and a Guggenheim Fellowship.

== Early life and education ==
Laura van den Berg was born and raised in Florida. She has a BA from Rollins College (2005) and an MFA from Emerson College (2008).

== Career ==
Her stories have been published in The Paris Review, McSweeney's, BOMB, Virginia Quarterly Review, Conjunctions, American Short Fiction, Ploughshares, Glimmer Train and One Story.

Her first collection of short stories, What the World Will Look Like When All the Water Leaves Us, was published in 2009, and her second collection, The Isle of Youth, was published in 2013. A third short story collection, I Hold a Wolf by the Ears, was published in 2020.

Her other books include two novels, Find Me (2015) and The Third Hotel (2018), which was a finalist for the Young Lions Fiction Award. Van den Berg has also published a chapbook of flash fiction, There Will Be No More Good Nights Without Good Nights (2012).

She is currently a senior lecturer at Harvard University in the English Department, where she is also Director of Creative Writing.

== Personal life ==
Van den Berg lives in Cambridge, Massachusetts with her husband, Paul Yoon.

== Awards and honors ==
- 2010 The Story Prize longlist for What the World Will Look Like When All the Water Leaves Us
- 2010 Frank O'Connor International Short Story Award shortlist for What the World Will Look Like When All the Water Leaves Us
- 2014 Frank O'Connor International Short Story Award shortlist for The Isle of Youth
- 2014 American Academy of Arts and Letters Rosenthal Family Foundation Award winner for The Isle of Youth
- 2019 Young Lions Fiction Award shortlist
- 2021 American Academy of Arts and Letters Strauss Livings Award
- 2021 Guggenheim Fellowship

== Selected works ==
- What the World Will Look Like When All the Water Leaves Us, Dzanc Books (2009)
- There Will Be No More Good Nights Without Good Nights, Origami Zoo Press / Bull City Press (2012)
- The Isle of Youth, Farrar, Straus and Giroux (2013)
- Find Me, Farrar, Straus and Giroux (2015)
- The Third Hotel, Farrar, Straus and Giroux (2018) ISBN 978-0374168353
- I Hold a Wolf by the Ears, Farrar, Straus and Giroux (2020) ISBN 978-0374102098
- State of Paradise: A Novel, Farrar, Straus and Giroux (2024) ISBN 978-0374612207
