= Valerie Trueblood =

American writer

Valerie Trueblood is an American writer. Among her notable works is her debut novel Seven Loves and the short story collection Search Party: Stories of Rescue (Counterpoint, 2013), a finalist for the 2014 PEN/Faulkner Award. Her story collection Marry or Burn (Counterpoint, 2010) was a finalist for the Frank O'Connor International Short Story Award.
