= Lawrence Scott =

Trinidad and Tobago writer (born 1943)

Lawrence Scott FRSL
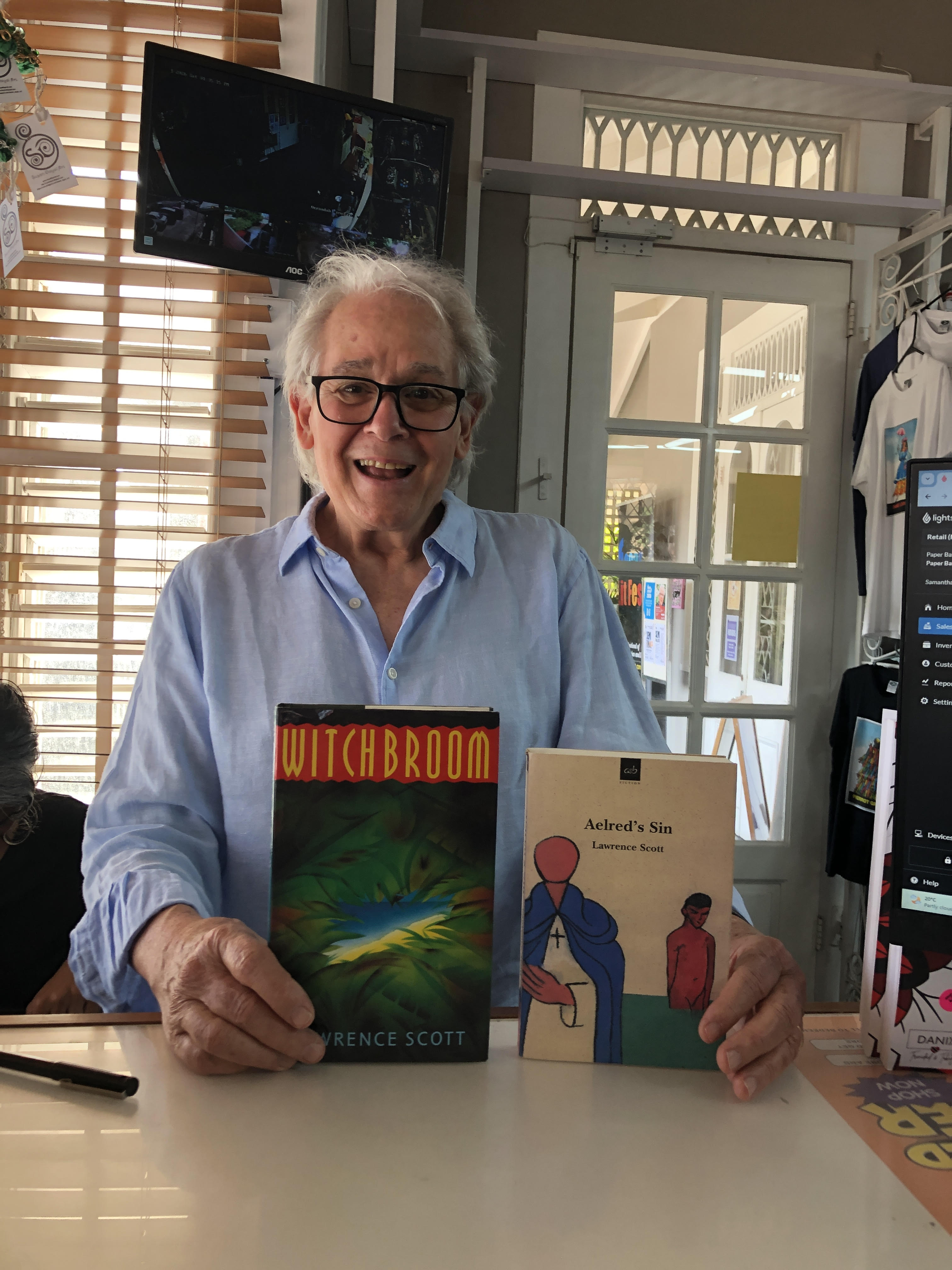
- Scott in 2026
- Born: 1943 (age 82–83); Trinidad
- Education: St Clare's Hall Oxford; Manchester University
- Occupations: Writer and teacher
- Notable work: Witchbroom (1992); Aelred's Sin (1998); Light Falling on Bamboo (2014)
- Awards: Tom-Gallon Trust Award; Commonwealth Writers' Prize
- Website: www.lawrencescott.co.uk

Lawrence Scott FRSL (born in Trinidad, 1943) is a novelist and short-story writer from Trinidad and Tobago, who divides his time between London and Port of Spain. He has also worked as a teacher of English and Drama at schools in London and in Trinidad.

Scott's novels have been awarded (1998) and shortlisted (1992, 2004) for the Commonwealth Writers' Prize and thrice nominated for the International Dublin Literary Award (for Aelred's Sin in 2000, Night Calypso in 2006, and Light Falling on Bamboo in 2014). His stories have been much anthologised and he won the Tom-Gallon Short-Story Award in 1986.

== Life and career ==
Born in Trinidad on a sugarcane estate, where his father was the manager for Tate & Lyle, Lawrence Scott is a descendant of Trinidad's French and German creoles. "His father's side came from Germany in the 1830s and were called Schoener. His mother's family, the Lange dynasty, were French-descended and part of an established white Creole community."

Scott was educated at Boys' RC School, San Fernando, Trinidad (1950–54), and by the Benedictine monks at the Abbey School, Mount Saint Benedict, Tunapuna (1955–62), before leaving at the age of 19 for England. There, he attended Prinknash Abbey, Gloucester, studying philosophy and theology (1963–67), St Clare's Hall Oxford, gaining a BA Hons. degree in English Language & Literature (1968–72), and Manchester University, earning a Certificate in Education, English & Drama (Distinction) in 1972–73.

Between 1973 and 2006, Scott worked as a teacher (of English and Drama) at various schools in London and in Trinidad, including Sedgehill, London; Thomas Calton Comprehensive, London; Presentation College, San Fernando, Trinidad; Aranguez Junior Secondary, Trinidad; Tulse Hill Comprehensive and Archbishop Tenison's, London. Between 1983 and 2006, he taught Literature and creative writing at City & Islington Sixth Form College, London.

In parallel to his teaching, Scott's career as a creative writer includes the publication since the 1990s of novels and collections of short stories. His stories have also been broadcast on BBC radio and have been anthologised internationally, notably in The Penguin Book of Caribbean Short Stories, The Oxford Book of Caribbean Short Stories and Our Caribbean, A Gathering of Lesbian & Gay Writing from the Antilles (Duke University Press). He has published poetry in several anthologies and journals, including Colours of a New Day: Writing for South Africa (Lawrence & Wishart, 1990), Caribbean New Voices 1 (Longman, 1995), Trinidad and Tobago Review, Cross/Cultures 60 (Editions Rodopi B.V. Amsterdam – New York, 2002), Agenda and Wasafiri. In addition he is the author of numerous essays, reviews and interviews on the work of other Caribbean writers, including Earl Lovelace and Derek Walcott.

Scott was a Writer-in-Residence at the University of the West Indies (UWI) in 2004. In 2006–09, he was a senior research fellow of The Academy for Arts, Letters, Culture and Public Affairs at the University of Trinidad and Tobago (UTT).

His academic research has included the Golconda Research/Writing Project, an oral history project in Trinidad. He has also researched extensively the life and times of Trinidad's 19th-century artist Michel-Jean Cazabon, which work informs his 2012 novel Light Falling on Bamboo.

In 2019, Scott was elected as a Fellow of the Royal Society of Literature.

== Writing ==
In 1986, Scott's short story "The House of Funerals" won the Tom-Gallon Award. His published books include novels, a short-story collection, a work of non-fiction and a volume of poems. His partner since the 1970s, Jenny Green, also a teacher, is his first reader and she is the author of a memoir entitled Somewhere Round the Corner.

Scott's first novel, Witchbroom (Allison and Busby, 1992), was shortlisted for a Commonwealth Writers' Prize and was broadcast as a Book at Bedtime on BBC Radio 4 in 1993, abridged by Margaret Busby in eight episodes, produced by Marina Salandy-Brown and read by the author. A 25th-anniversary edition of Witchbroom, published by Papillote Press, was launched in Trinidad at PaperBased bookshop in Port-of-Spain on 18 March 2017, with a keynote address by Earl Lovelace and readings by Ken Ramchand, Barbara Jenkins and Marina Salandy-Brown. Witchbroom was described by Trinidad and Tobago Newsday as "a breathtaking novel, filled with memorable characters and important history." According to the review in BookBlast, "Lawrence Scott weaves a magical, lush tapestry of words and images, bringing alive local legends and family narratives; and redressing written histories. The impact of the events recounted still resonate in Caribbean society today. A quasi-historical novel, Witchbroom recounts the story of a colonial white enclave on an offshore island through muddled memories. ... The stories are bewitching and highly disturbing. The reader surfs a tidal wave of addictive fascination like a Dickensian tricoteuse sitting beside the guillotine in Paris watching heads roll during the public executions of 1793-4.

Of his 1994 story collection Ballad for the New World, Publishers Weekly said: "Scott ... has filled his collection of 12 short stories with all the rich nuances of the Caribbean, creating a convincing backdrop that allows even the most sedentary armchair traveler to visualize each tale's progression."

Scott's second novel, Aelred's Sin (1998), described by Raoul Pantin as "a fine and sensitive and compassionate book…a worthwhile contribution to the hallowed tradition of West Indian literature", won a Commonwealth Writers' Prize Best Book (Canada & Caribbean) in 1999. In 2000, Aelred's Sin was longlisted for the International IMPAC Dublin Literary Award.

Night Calypso (2004), Scott's next novel, was described by Mike Phillips in The Guardian as "unique in being a serious, knowledgeable and beautifully written treatise about a little-known corner of experience and its relationship to a wider world", while Chris Searle in the Morning Star called it "an educative, startling and moving reading experience". It was also nominated for the International IMPAC Dublin Literary Award, appearing on the 2006 longlist.

Scott's 2012 novel, Light Falling on Bamboo, was called "really a fascinating read" by Verdel Bishop in the Trinidad Express. Set in early 19th-century Trinidad, while the novel is a re-imagining of the life of the celebrated landscape painter Cazabon, according to Monique Roffey's review in The Independent Scott captures so much more. This novel shows us the dark 'truth of an age' in a small corner of the New World, once dependent on slave labour." For the Financial Times reviewer, Scott has "conjured a convincing fictional portrait ... in this beautifully subtle and sensitive novel." Selwyn Cudjoe's review stated: "Lawrence Scott has written an important historical romance. [...] the loving attention that Scott devotes to detail, sensitivity to light and colour, and his determination to capture the many tones of his landscape and people give his romance a translucence and luminosity that is wondrous to behold. We owe him a debt of gratitude for offering us this way of seeing during this period in our history." Light Falling on Bamboo was longlisted for the 2014 International Dublin Literary Award.

In 2015, Scott's collection of stories Leaving By Plane Swimming Back Underwater was published by Papillote Press. Alexander Lucie-Smith wrote in the Catholic Herald: "Scott’s writing resembles that fretwork familiar from decaying porches and window frames: intricate, almost rococo, and because Trinidad is such a multi-layered place, because nothing is simple, his style is perfectly suited to his subject. Scott comes nearest to any English language author I know to carrying off that difficult task of evoking a place that is real and at the same time completely other."

Scott's 2021 work, Dangerous Freedom (Papillote Press), is a historical novel that draws on the life story of Dido Belle. A review for Pluto Magazine by Dominique Lancastre praised the novel as an "outstanding piece of literature ... which deserves to be read by all."

Looking for Cazabon, the debut collection of poetry by Scott, was published in 2024. It comprises poems inspired by the research he did into the life and times of painter Michel-Jean Cazabon for the 2012 novel Light Falling on Bamboo.

== Selected awards and honours ==
=== Literary awards ===
- 1986: Tom-Gallon Short-Story Award, won for "The House of Funerals"
- 1993: Commonwealth Writers' Prize Best First Book, shortlisted for Witchbroom
- 1999: Commonwealth Writers' Prize Best Book (Canada & Caribbean), winner for Aelred's Sin
- 2000: International Dublin Literary Award, longlisted Aelred's Sin
- 2004: Commonwealth Writers' Prize Best Book in Canada & the Caribbean, shortlisted for Night Calypso
- 2005: International Dublin Literary Award, longlisted Night Calypso
- 2014: International Dublin Literary Award, longlisted Light Falling on Bamboo

=== Honors ===
- 2019: Elected as a Fellow of the Royal Society of Literature
- 2023: Honorary degree (DLitt) from the University of the West Indies, St. Augustine Campus

== Bibliography ==
=== Novels ===
- Witchbroom (Allison & Busby, 1992, ISBN 9780850318180; Heinemann Caribbean Writers Series, 1993, ISBN 9780435989330; 25th-anniversary edition, Papillote Press, 2017, ISBN 9780993108686)
- Aelred's Sin (Allison & Busby, 1998, ISBN 9780749003746)
- Night Calypso (Allison & Busby, 2004, ISBN 9780749081652)
- Light Falling on Bamboo (Tindal Street Press, 2012, ISBN 9781781251584)
- Dangerous Freedom (Papillote Press, 2021, ISBN 9781999776862)

=== Short stories ===
- Ballad for the New World (Heinemann Caribbean Writers Series, 1994, ISBN 9780435989392) – includes the story "The House of Funerals"
- Leaving by Plane Swimming Back Underwater (Papilotte Press, 2015; ISBN 9780957118782)

=== Non-fiction ===
- Golconda: Our Voices Our Lives, editor (University of Trinidad and Tobago Press, 2009); ISBN 9789766510008

=== Poetry ===
- Looking for Cazabon, (Papilotte Press, 2024; ISBN 9781739130367)

== See also ==
- Caribbean literature
- Caribbean poetry
- Postcolonial literature
