= Manuel Muñoz (writer) =

American novelist, short story writer, and professor

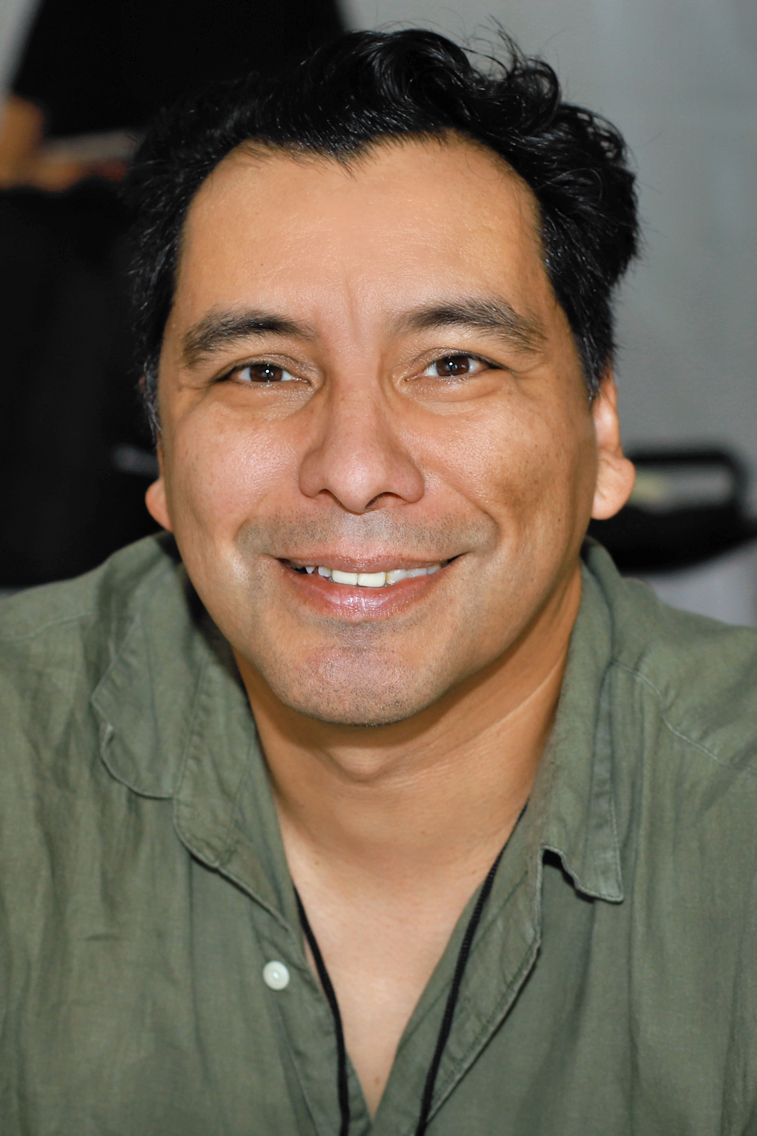
- Muñoz at the 2022 Texas Book Festival.
- Born: Dinuba, California, United States
- Education: Harvard College (AB); Cornell University (MFA)
- Occupations: Novelist, short story writer, college professor
- Writing career
- Period: Late 20th–early 21st century
- Genre: Literary fiction
- Notable works: Zigzagger, What You See in the Dark
- Website: www.manuel-munoz.com

Manuel Muñoz is an American novelist, short story writer, and professor at the University of Arizona in Tucson, Arizona.

== Biography ==
Muñoz was born in Dinuba, California, a small city in the Central Valley of California, to a family of Mexican-American farm workers. Despite his family's economic woes – and his occasionally having to lend a hand during the grape harvest – Muñoz performed very well in school. He graduated from Harvard University in 1994, and went on to earn a Masters in Fine Arts from Cornell University in 1998 He met Helena María Viramontes, who has had an important influence on his work, at Cornell. Muñoz considers her to be "his literary godmother."

He moved to New York City in 2001, where he lived until 2008 when he accepted a position as Assistant Professor of Creative Writing at the University of Arizona in Tucson, Arizona.

== Writing career ==
Muñoz's early writing appeared in various publications, notably Rush Hour, Swink, Epoch, Glimmer Train, Edinburgh Review, and Boston Review. His first collection of short stories, Zigzagger, was published in 2003. Most of the stories in this first tome are set in the rural towns of the Central Valley of California, which resemble his hometown of Dinuba. Muñoz has noted that the Central Valley has functioned as "reservoir of creativity" for him. David Ebershoff in a review for the Los Angeles Times wrote, "Muñoz has created a wholly authentic vision of contemporary California— one that has little to do with coastlines, cities or silicon. ... Zigzagger heralds the arrival of a gifted and sensitive writer." Helena Maria Viramontes wrote that "Zigzagger is not merely a contribution to Latina/o letters, but a major breakthrough."

His second collection of short fiction, The Faith Healer of Olive Avenue, was shortlisted for the 2007 Frank O'Connor International Short Story Award. Like Zigzagger, The Faith Healer of Olive Avenue takes place in a small community in the Central Valley. Jeff Turrentine of The New York Times wrote of the collection: "His stories are far too rich to be classified under the limiting rubrics of "gay" or "Chicano" fiction; they have a softly glowing, melancholy beauty that transcends those categories and makes them universal."

In his first novel, What You See in the Dark (2011), Muñoz moves away from the familiar rural settings of the Central Valley to the set of Alfred Hitchcock's Psycho in 1950s Bakersfield, California. Muñoz uses the second person singular to draw his reader into the novel. A starred review in Publishers Weekly called What You See in the Dark a "stellar first novel. [...] The lyrical prose and sensitive portrayal of the crime's ripple effect in the small community elevate this far beyond the typical noir."

== Awards and honors ==
=== Fellowships, grants, honors ===
- 2006 National Endowment for the Arts Fellowship
- 2008 Whiting Award
- 2009 PEN/O. Henry Award for his story "Tell Him About Brother John."
- 2015 PEN/O. Henry Award for his story "The Happiest Girl in the USA."
- 2017 PEN/O. Henry Award for his story "The Reason Is Because"
- The Best American Short Stories 2019 includes "Anyone Can Do It"
- New York Foundation for the Arts Fellowship
- 2023 MacArthur Fellow ("genius grant")

=== Literary prize ===
Year	Title	Award	Category	Result	Ref.
2007	The Faith Healer of Olive Avenue	Lambda Literary Awards	Gay Fiction	Finalist	
2007	The Faith Healer of Olive Avenue	Frank O'Connor International Short Story Award	—	Shortlisted	
2023	The Consequences: Stories	Aspen Words Literary Prize	—	Shortlisted	
2023	The Consequences: Stories	Joyce Carol Oates Literary Prize	—	Won	

== Works ==
- Zigzagger. Northwestern University Press. 2003. ISBN 978-0-8101-2098-3. "Manuel Muñoz Zigzagger."
- The Faith Healer of Olive Avenue. Algonquin Books Of Chapel Hill. 2007. ISBN 978-1-56512-532-2.
- What You See in the Dark. Algonquin Books Of Chapel Hill. 2011. ISBN 978-1-56512-533-9.
- The Consequences. Graywolf Press. 2022. ISBN 978-1-64445-206-6.
