= The Isle of Youth =

2013 short story collection by Laura van den Berg

- Author: Laura van den Berg
- Cover artist: Abby Kagan
- Language: English
- Genre: Short stories
- Publisher: Farrar, Straus and Giroux
- Publication date: November 5, 2013
- Publication place: United States
- Pages: 242
- ISBN: 978-0-374-17723-2

The Isle of Youth is a 2013 book of short stories by American author Laura van den Berg. These short stories are told from the perspective of young women and revolve around the themes of secrecy, deception, and self-discovery.

The short story collection has received many awards and accolades, including being named an NPR Best Book of 2013, as well as making it to the shortlist for the 2013 Frank O'Conner International Short Story Award.

== Plot ==
=== "I Looked for You, I Called Your Name" ===
A woman goes on her honeymoon but faces a series of disasters on the trip, including a plane crash, a broken nose and a hotel fire. She soon realizes these events are reflective of the looming end to her marriage.

=== "Opa-Locka" ===
A woman and her sister run their own private investigation business, and they are hired to investigate a man whose wife suspects he is having an affair. However, the man disappears while they are watching him, and they are ensnared in the ensuing investigation. Along the way, they also learn about their criminal father's mysterious past.

=== "Lessons" ===
A young woman named Dana, her two cousins, and her thirteen-year-old brother leave their family's farm and travel the countryside, committing robberies and bank heists. One day, a bank heist goes wrong, and witnesses see Dana's brother's face, forcing Dana to choose between protecting her brother or staying loyal to her cousins.

=== "Acrobat" ===
A woman and her husband are on vacation in Paris, but her husband decides to end the marriage and go home alone. In the face of her failed marriage, the woman reacts by following around and eventually joining a group of street acrobats in Paris.

=== "Antarctica" ===
A housewife travels to Antarctica after finding out her brother died in an explosion at a research station there. While trying to figure out how he died, she reflects on the secrets she kept from him that may have led to his death.

=== "The Greatest Escape" ===
A teenage girl is an assistant in her mother's struggling magic show, and she turns to theft and deception to make money of her own. She soon realizes the scale of her own mother's deception when she discovers the truth about her missing father.

=== "The Isle of Youth" ===
The titular story revolves around a woman who travels to Florida at the request of her estranged twin sister. The twin sister asks the main character to switch places for a few days, while the sister goes on a lavish vacation with her married lover at the Isle of Youth in Cuba. However, the woman soon discovers her twin sister's deception, both in trying to steal her husband, as well as in the real purpose of their life swap. Then her sister finds out and she run a way.

== Themes ==
=== Deception/Secrecy ===
The most obvious themes present in every story are deception and secrecy. One critic wrote that the stories are about "the secrets we keep from each other, and ourselves." In each story, it is these secrets that drive the stories, with each woman's deception causing or influencing the events in each story.

=== Role of the Observer ===
All of the main characters are observers of the events of each story. They do not have a direct impact on what happens. They are hyper-aware of the events taking place around them, yet they are unable to do anything about any of it. In "I Looked For You, I Called Your Name", "Opa-Locka", "Acrobat", and "The Isle of Youth", this is apparent in how each woman watches her marriage fall apart.

=== Self-Discovery ===
Each of the stories features the main female character searching for some piece of information about others or themselves. By the end of each story, each woman discovers something, usually about herself. One critic wrote this self-discovery at the end of each story allows the reader to feel a sense of freedom.

The self-discovery comes in different forms in every story. In "I Looked for You, I Called Your Name", the main character realizes the extent and reasons behind her failed marriage. In "Lessons", the main character realizes her role in the destruction of her little brother. In "The Greatest Escape", the main character's self-discovery occurs when she learns the truth about her father's disappearance, which opens her eyes to the reality of the larger world as well.

== Style ==
Van den Berg's stories are written with a cool, detached tone. One critic said the book had a specific feeling of "aloofness in the face of strange events." Another called her prose "crisp and cool." Because of this, critics have compared Van den Berg's style to that of other famous authors, such as Haruki Murakami and Richard Lange.

== Reception ==
The book has received widespread praise from critics at organizations such as Kirkus Reviews, The New York Times, The Boston Globe, Vanity Fair, The Wall Street Journal, and many more. John Williams, of The New York Times, called the stories "confident and gripping."

Also, Kirkus Reviews called the book "a mesmerizing collection of stories about the secrets that keep us."

The book did receive some negative reception, with one NPR review saying the collection contained "one or two duds" with "brittle" storytelling. Despite this, the same critic then went on to say the rest of the stories were "full of delicacy and surprise."

In 2013, the book was named an NPR Best Book of 2013. In 2014, the final short story of the collection, "The Isle of Youth", was named to the shortlist for the 2013 Frank O'Conner International Short Story Award.
