= The Illusion of Separateness =

2013 novel by Simon Van Booy

- Author: Simon Van Booy
- Language: English
- Genre: Literary fiction; historical fiction
- Publisher: Harper (HarperCollins)
- Publication date: June 2013
- Publication place: United States
- Media type: Print (hardcover, paperback), e-book
- Pages: 224
- ISBN: 978-0-06-211224-8

The Illusion of Separateness is a 2013 novel by British-American author Simon Van Booy.

== Reception ==
Jessica Lakso praised the book, writing, "His writing is consciously poetic and at times aphoristic, and he deftly portrays his characters' raw emotions." In a starred review, Publishers Weekly called the work "a fractured but fine-tuned narrative" and stated "the writing is what makes this remarkable book soar".
