= Night Boat to Tangier =

2019 novel by Kevin Barry

- First edition cover
- Author: Kevin Barry
- Audio read by: Kevin Barry
- Language: English
- Genre: Literary fiction Crime fiction
- Set in: Algeciras on 23 October 2018
- Publisher: Canongate Books
- Publication date: 20 June 2019
- Publication place: Ireland
- Media type: Print (hardcover)
- Pages: 224
- ISBN: 978-1-78211-617-2
- OCLC: 1081267637
- Dewey Decimal: 823.92
- LC Class: PR6102.A7833 N54 2019

Night Boat to Tangier is a 2019 novel by Kevin Barry. It is his third novel and was published on 20 June 2019 by the Edinburgh-based publisher Canongate Books.

It was longlisted for the 2019 Booker Prize.

== Plot ==
The novel is set over a 24-hour period on 23 October 2018 in the terminal building at the Andalusian port city of Algeciras in southern Spain. It follows longtime partners and "fading gangsters from Cork City" Charlie Redmond and Maurice Hearne as they wait for Maurice's missing daughter, Dilly, to pass through on a boat from Tangier, Morocco or leave on one heading there. The two men were once involved in smuggling Moroccan hashish to Ireland through the ports of Spain.

== Reception ==
Publishers Weekly wrote, "Barry is a writer of the first rate, and his prose is at turns lean and lyrical, but always precise. Though some scenes land as stiff and schematic, the characters' banter is wildly and inventively coarse, and something to behold ."

Kirkus Reviews gave the novel a favourable review, writing, "Barry adds an exceptional chapter to the literary history of a country that inspires cruelty and comedy and uncommon writing."

Writing for The Guardian, Scottish novelist Alan Warner gave the novel a rave review, writing, "Barry's sensibility is eerie; he is attuned to spirits, to malevolent presences, the psychic tundra around us. But what distinguishes this book beyond its humour, terror and beauty of description is its moral perception."

Johanna Thomas-Corr, writing for The Times, panned the novel and called its story "flimsy", writing, "The dangers of turning a script into fiction are many and Barry skirts none of them. A novel needs interiority, an intimacy between characters and reader, a simultaneous conveyance of narrative and commentary. Barry does the bare minimum."

The novel was named one of the top ten books of 2019 by The New York Times Book Review.

== Film adaptation ==
At the 2023 Cannes Market, a film adaptation was announced with Barry adapting his material for the screen. James Marsh was attached to direct the film starring Michael Fassbender, Domhnall Gleeson and Ruth Negga.
