= City of Bohane =

2011 novel by Kevin Barry

- First edition
- Author: Kevin Barry
- Language: English
- Genre: Literary Fiction
- Publisher: Jonathan Cape
- Publication date: 31 March 2011
- Publication place: Ireland
- Media type: Print
- Pages: 288
- ISBN: 9780099549154
- OCLC: 846787264
- Dewey Decimal: 823.92

City of Bohane /boʊˈhæn/ is the debut novel by Ireland's Kevin Barry. The book is set in the year 2053, in a world with minimal technology. It received largely positive reviews and won the 2013 International Dublin Literary Award.

== Synopsis ==
City of Bohane is set in west Ireland in 2053. It features a world with minimal laws and technology where feuding gangs compete for control of the city of Bohane. There is public transit in the form of trams, but no cars. Characters write letters rather than phone and music is broadcast on wind up radios. Characters dress in flamboyant clothes and talk in an invented dialect. Barry describes it as a "demented malevolent" world inspired by what "homicidal teenage hipsters" might sound like in 40 years. "It's written in Technicolor," he explains. "It's intended to be a big, visceral entertainment as well as a serious language experiment."

The book is influenced by American television, featuring short chapters and "an awful lot" of dialogue. "There's no question that the best long-form fiction being written now is probably in American television," explains Barry. "Maybe it's time novels started stealing something back [from television]." The geography of the fictional Bohane is based on Porto, Portugal where Barry was holidaying when he got the idea for the novel.

City of Bohane tracks the lives of the Hartnett Fancy gang which controls most of Bohane. Logan Hartnett runs the family, but is heavily influenced by his 90-year-old mother. A feud between the Hartnett family and the Cusack family begins when a Cusack gets "reefed" (stabbed). Reinforcements arrive and the feud turns into an all out battle for control of the city.

== Reception ==
Writing for The Guardian, Scarlett Thomas said City of Bohane shows Barry is a "writer of great promise." She says he "is a great storyteller", and calls the novel's twists and turns "satisfying, if, in places, familiar". The characters have all different voices, she says. Thomas called the novel's plot and Barry's invented vernacular "a wonderful blend of past, present and imagined future."

A review published in Metro called City of Bohane an "exuberant, spine-tinglingly atmospheric creation". The novel has a variety of influences and is "a highly entertaining place to lose yourself in," writes the Metro reviewer. "The Bohane lingo takes a little while to settle into but it's worth the work," he adds.

On 5 November 2019 BBC News listed City of Bohane on its list of the 100 "most inspiring" novels.

== Awards ==
City of Bohane won the prestigious International Dublin Literary Award in 2013. "Kevin Barry's Ireland of 2053 is a place you may not want to be alive in, but you'll certainly relish reading about," remarked the judging panel. City of Bohane beat out 153 other titles nominated by libraries around the world for the prize. The International Dublin Literary Award is open to novels from any country that were written in English, or have been translated into it. The ten finalists for the award came from eight countries. Five of the ten were first published in a language other than English. The award carries a €100,000 prize, making it one of the richest literary prizes in the world.

Barry became the third Irish author to win the prize, joining Colm Toibin who won in 2006 with The Master and Colum McCann who won in 2011 with Let the Great World Spin. "The fact that this award originates with the libraries is what makes it very special for me," remarked Barry. He said he has no plans to spend the money. As a writer, he explains, "you have good years and lean years. This award makes it a good year. It buys you a lot of time to be sitting at your desk, inventing deranged little worlds. It allows you to keep going – that's the definition of success for a writer." Lord Mayor of Dublin and award patron, Naoise Ó Muirí remarked "I'm thrilled to see an Irish author of such immense talent take home this year's award."

City of Bohane also won the Authors' Club First Novel Award in 2012, and was shortlisted in the First Novel category at the 2011 Costa Book Awards.
