= Kirsty Gunn =

New Zealand-born British writer

- Born: New Zealand
- Occupation: Writer
- Notable work: The Boy and the Sea (2006), The Big Music (2012), Infidelities (2014)
- Awards: Scottish Arts Council Book of the Year award, New Zealand Post Book Awards Book of the Year award, Edge Hill Short Story Prize
- Website: www.kirsty-gunn.com

Kirsty Gunn (born 1960, New Zealand) is a novelist, essayist, short story writer, and professor of creative writing. She has won the Scottish Arts Council Book of the Year award, the New Zealand Post Book Awards Book of the Year award, and the Edge Hill Short Story Prize.

== Education and academic career ==
Gunn studied at Victoria University and Oxford University.

She has taught creative writing at Oxford University. She is currently a Professor in Creative Writing at the University of Dundee and a Fellow of the Royal Society of Literature, the Royal Literary Fund, and the Royal Society of Edinburgh.

== Writing career ==
Gunn's debut, the short novel Rain, was published in 1994. In 2001, the novel was adapted as both a film of the same name, directed by Christine Jeffs, and as a ballet by the Rosas Company, set to "Music for Eighteen Musicians", a 1976 score by Steve Reich.

Gunn's first collection of short stories, This Place You Return to Is Home, was published in 1999 and received a Scottish Arts Council Bursary for Literature. The collection included a story, 'Tinsel Bright', that was selected for The Faber Book of Contemporary Stories About Childhood in 1997.

Her fourth novel, The Boy and the Sea, was published in 2006. It won the Scottish Arts Council Book of the Year award in 2007.

Her 2012 novel The Big Music won the Book of the Year in the 2013 New Zealand Post Book Awards. The novel took seven years to write, and was inspired by pibroch, the classical music of the great Highland bagpipe.

Gunn's 2014 short story collection, Infidelities, won the Edge Hill Short Story Prize and was shortlisted for the Frank O'Connor Award.

Gunn's most recent novel, Caroline's Bikini, was published in 2018. A metafictional romance, The Guardian described it as "bold and brainy" but "frustrating". The Times Literary Supplement described it as "a clever, sly novel about the nature of the fictional and the real".

In 2024, Gunn published her third short fiction collection, Pretty Ugly. It was a finalist for the Jann Medlicott Acorn Prize for Fiction at the 2025 Ockham New Zealand Book Awards.

Gunn has also published works that combine essay, fiction and autobiography, including 44 Things (2007) and My Katherine Mansfield Project (2015) (published in New Zealand as Thorndon: Wellington and Home: My Katherine Mansfield Project).

== Awards and nominations ==
Year	Title	Award	Category	Result	Ref.
2007	The Boy and the Sea	Sundial Scottish Arts Council Book Awards	Fiction	Won	
2007	The Boy and the Sea	Sundial Scottish Arts Council Book Awards	Book of the Year	Won	
2013	The Big Music	New Zealand Post Book Awards	Fiction	Won	
2013	The Big Music	New Zealand Post Book Awards	NZ Post Book of the Year	Won	
2013	The Big Music	James Tait Black Memorial Prize	Fiction	Shortlisted	
2015	Infidelities	Edge Hill Short Story Prize	—	Won	
2015	Infidelities	Frank O'Connor International Short Story Award	—	Shortlisted	

== Works ==
=== Novels ===
- —— (1994). Rain. London: Faber and Faber. ISBN 0571173004.
- —— (1997). The Keepsake. London: Granta Books. ISBN 186207013X.
- —— (2002). Featherstone. London: Faber. ISBN 0571212476.
- —— (2006). The Boy and the Sea. London: Faber. ISBN 978-0571230198.
- —— (2012). The Big Music. London: Faber. ISBN 978-0571282333.
- —— (2018). Caroline's Bikini. London: Faber. ISBN 978-0571339327.

=== Short stories ===
- —— (1999). This Place You Return To Is Home. London: Granta. ISBN 1862072353.
- —— (2014). Infidelities. London: Faber. ISBN 978-0571308910.
- —— (2024). Pretty Ugly. London: Rough Trade Books. ISBN 978-1914236419.

=== Other ===
- —— (2006). 44 Things: A Year of Life at Home. London: Atlantic Books. ISBN 978-1843545521.
- —— (2015). My Katherine Mansfield Project. Kendal: Notting Hill Editions. ISBN 978-1910749043.
- —— (2016). Going Bush. London: Sylph Editions. ISBN 978-1909631175.
- —— (2016). Notes Towards a National Literature. Edinburgh: Saltire Society. ISBN 978-0854111220.

=== As contributor, co-author or editor ===
- Greer, Bonnie; Roberts, Michèle; Bailey, Hilary; Pullinger, Kate; Randhawa, Ravi; Gunn, Kirsty; Segrave, Elisa; Faress, Souad; Gittins, Chrissie; Kaye, Geraldine; Rafferty, Stella; Rock, Daphne; Whiteson, Karen (1995). LeFanu, Sarah (ed.). How Maxine Learned to Love her Legs and Other Tales of Growing Up. London: Aurora Metro Books. ISBN 978-0-9515877-4-4.
- Low, Gail Ching-Liang; Gunn, Kirsty, eds. (2016). The Voyage Out: An Anthology. Dundee: The Voyage Out Press. ISBN 978-0995512306.
- Low, Gail Ching-Liang; Gunn, Kirsty, eds. (2019). Vaulted Marvels. Dundee: The Voyage Out Press. ISBN 978-0995512399.
- Low, Gail Ching-Liang; Gunn, Kirsty, eds. (2022). Imagined Spaces. Dundee: The Voyage Out Press. ISBN 978-0995512344.
- ——, ed. (2022). Such a Sweet Singing: Poetry to Empower Every Woman. London: Batsford Books. ISBN 978-1849947152.
