= Simon Van Booy =

British-American writer

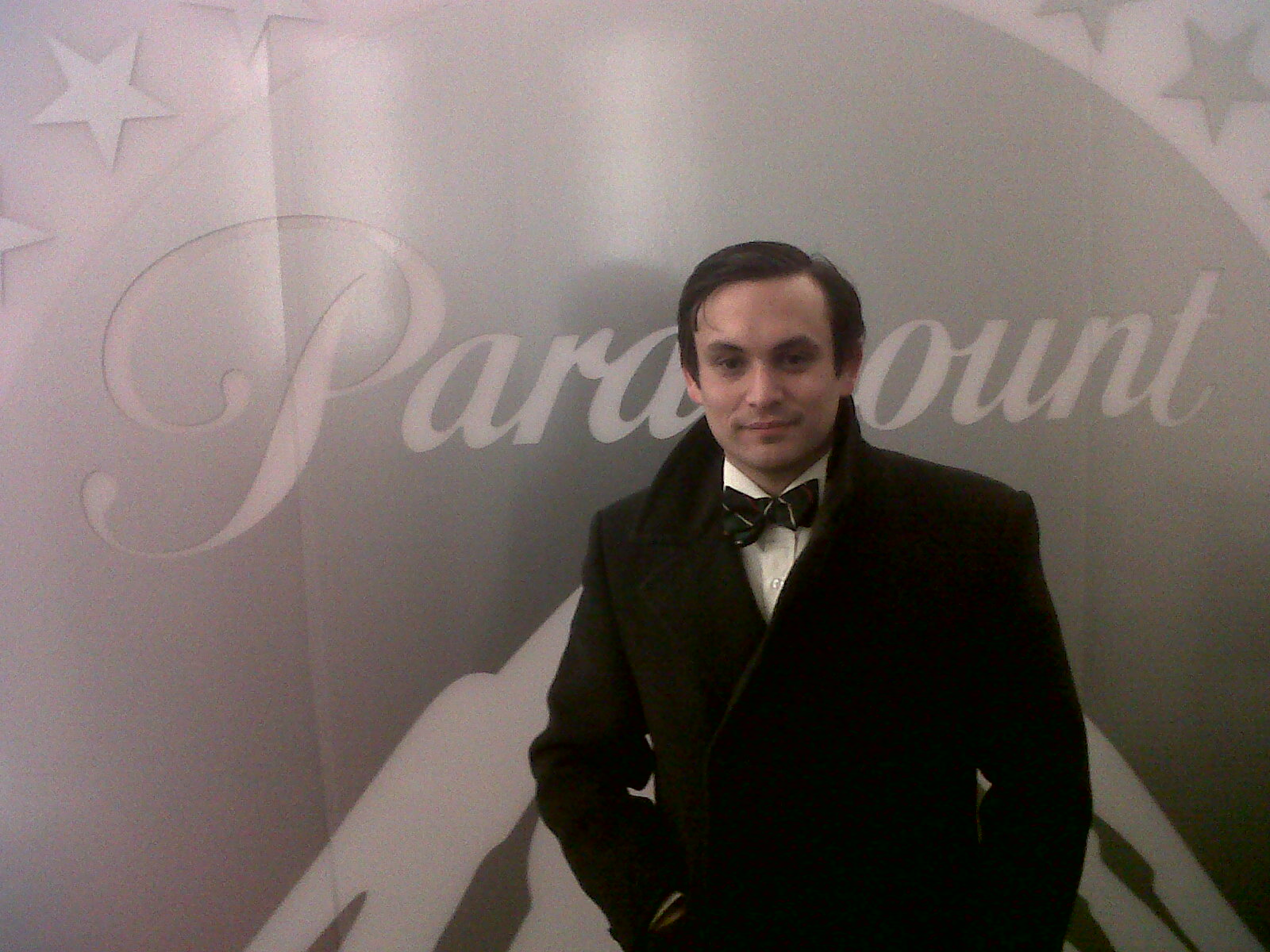
- Simon Van Booy in 2011.
- Born: 1975 (age 50–51)
- Education: Dartington College of Arts; Southampton College
- Occupation: Author
- Website: SimonVanBooy.com

Simon Van Booy (born 1975) is an Anglo-American writer, currently living in the United States. His short story collection, Love Begins in Winter, won the 2009 Frank O'Connor International Short Story Award. He was a finalist for the 2011 Vilcek Prize for Creative Promise.

== Fiction ==
Simon Van Booy has written three collections of short stories. The first was The Secret Lives of People in Love; the second collection, Love Begins in Winter, won the Frank O'Connor International Short Story Award. His third collection, Tales of Accidental Genius, was released in 2015.

Van Booy's first novel, Everything Beautiful Began After, was released in 2011, and was nominated for the 2012 Indies Choice Book Award for Fiction, while his second novel, The Illusion of Separateness, was released in 2013. He released a third novel titled Father's Day in 2016.

Van Booy's fourth novel, Night Came with Many Stars, was released in 2021. NPR Books review Jason Sheehan called it Van Booy's best novel to date, writing “It is a heartbreaking book, a gorgeous book . . . In Night, Van Booy finds the weakness, grace and beauty of common lives fully lived.” Boston Globe columnist Joan Frank wrote “Kindness and raw luck undergird Night Came with Many Stars… And like Dickens’s young heroes, Van Booy’s determined souls act with their whole hearts—as does this brave, fierce novel—to earn what good may come.” USA Today named Night Came with Many Stars to a list of “5 Books Not to Miss.”

In 2010, Van Booy released his first children's book, Pobble's Way, to be followed by Gertie Milk and the Keeper of Lost Things in 2017.

== Other works ==
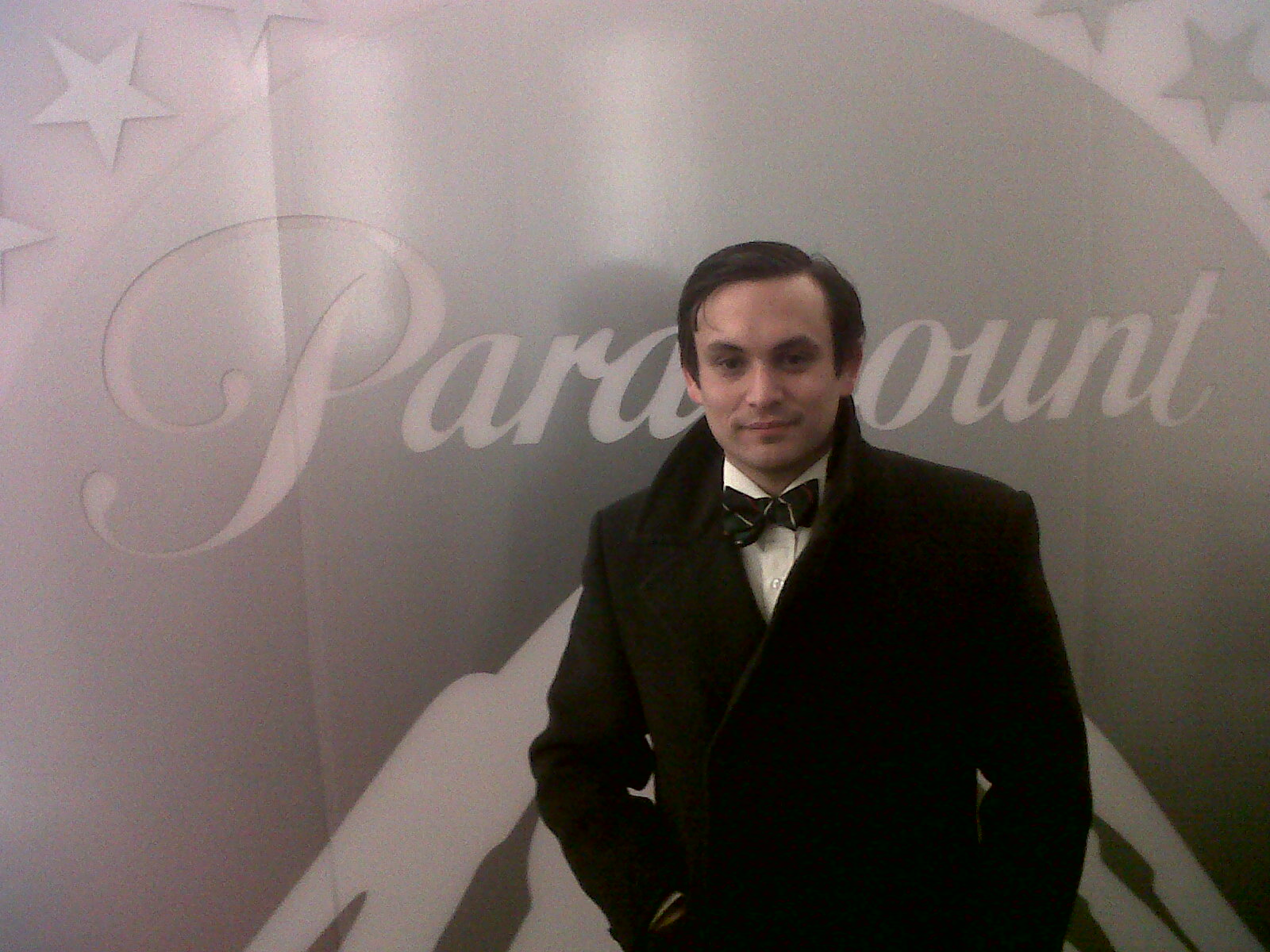
Simon Van Booy, New York, 2011

Van Booy is the editor of three volumes of philosophy, entitled Why We Fight, Why We Need Love, and Why Our Decisions Don't Matter.

Van Booy's essays have been published in newspapers internationally, including The New York Times, The New York Post, The Daily Telegraph, The Guardian, and The Times. They have also been broadcast on National Public Radio.

In 2011, Van Booy delivered his first full-length stage comedy, and wrote an award-winning short film for the Morgans Hotel Group called Love Is Like Life But Longer.

== Teaching and lecturing ==
Van Booy lectures frequently at schools, universities, and libraries in the United States, the United Kingdom, and in China. He teaches part-time at the School of Visual Arts in New York City, and at Long Island University, C.W. Post Campus. He is an advocate of education as a means of social reform, and involved in the Rutgers University Early College Humanities program (REaCH) for young adults living in under-served communities.

== Design ==
Since 2009, Partners & Spade have carried Van Booy's "custom vintage Antarctic explorers' skis," and cold-weather hats, which he designed to support research in Antarctic regions and raise awareness for the Scott Polar Research Institute at University of Cambridge.

== In translation ==
Van Booy's fiction and essays have been translated into over eighteen languages throughout the world. In 2011 he embarked on a multiple city reading tour of China, where his books are available in two different varieties of Chinese.

== Criticism ==
His short story collections received positive reviews from The New York Times and the Los Angeles Times

Publishers Weekly gave The Illusion of Separateness a starred review, and said "the writing is what makes this remarkable book soar".

Booklist, the publication of the American Library Association, praised Van Booy's fourth novel, Night Came with Many Stars, writing “A beautifully realized, multigenerational family novel that is exceptional for its memorable, fully developed characters. Readers will become emotionally invested…invited to consider the meaning of family and the power of memory.”

== Personal life ==
Van Booy grew up in Ruthin and Oxford, and currently resides in New York. He has one daughter, and married Christina Daigneault in 2013.

== List of works ==
- 2002: Love & The Five Senses won the H. R. Hays Poetry Prize
- 2007: The Secret Lives of People in Love
- 2009: Love Begins in Winter won the Frank O'Connor International Short Story Award
- 2010: Pobble's Way won Society of School Librarians International Honor Book Award
- 2011: Why We Need Love
- 2011: Why Our Decisions Don't Matter
- 2011: Why We Fight
- 2011: Everything Beautiful Began After
- 2012: The Illusion of Separateness
- 2015: Tales of Accidental Genius: Stories
- 2016: Father’s Day
- 2017: Gertie Milk & the Keeper of Lost Things
- 2018: Gertie Milk & the Great Keeper Rescue
- 2018: The Sadness of Beautiful Things
- 2021: Night Came with Many Stars
- 2022: The Presence of Absence
- 2024: Sipsworth
