= Oregon Riptide =

- Founded: 2006
- League: ABA
- Team history: no games ever played
- Based in: Portland, Oregon
- Owner: Christopher Sears
- Championships: 0

The Oregon Riptide was the name chosen for an American Basketball Association (ABA) franchise which was to be based in Portland, Oregon. In May, 2006, founding team owner, Jeremy "J" Brice, of Salem, had gained ABA approval, opened a front office in downtown Portland, and announced its staff. A May 27 free agent camp was held to recruit an initial roster of players.

Brice arranged with Warner Pacific College for arena facilities for a summer youth basketball camp to be sponsored by the team, and for the competitive season to have begun in November, 2006. He had even contracted with the Jupiter Hotel to house visiting team members.

Plans for the youth camp were quickly cancelled in July, 2006, following an article revealing that Brice, a Nevada native who had served as a high school and youth league coach, was a registered sex offender in both California and Oregon. As a result, he could not have unsupervised contact with girls under 18, except for his daughter. Warner Pacific, a Christian college affiliated with the conservative Church of God (Anderson), withdrew availability of their facilities.

Brice sold the franchise to Christopher Sears less than a week later, telling a reporter for the Tribune, "I am no longer associated with the Riptide due to the negativity and black cloud over my name." The league approved the transfer, and Joe Newman, ABA CEO, stated that the team would still play in the 2006 season. When the ABA season started in November 2006, however, the Oregon Riptide was not on the schedule.
