= Frank O'Connor International Short Story Award =

Annual literary prize for a short story collection

- Awarded for: Best short story collection
- Sponsored by: Cork City Council
- Location: Frank O'Connor International Short Story Festival, Cork, Ireland
- Country: Ireland
- Presented by: Munster Literature Centre
- First award: 2005
- Final award: 2015
- Website: Official website

The Frank O'Connor International Short Story Award—named in honour of Frank O'Connor, who devoted much of his work to the form—was an international literary award presented for the best short story collection. It was presented between 2005 and 2015. The prize amount, €25,000 as of 2012, is one of the richest short-story collection prizes in the world (see also Premio de Narrativa Breve Ribera del Duero). Each year, approximately sixty books were longlisted, with either four or six books shortlisted, and the ultimate decision being made by three judges.

== History ==
In 2000, the Cork, Ireland Munster Literature Centre organised the first Frank O'Connor International Short Story Festival, an event dedicated to the celebration of the short story and named for Cork writer Frank O'Connor. The festival showcases readings, literary forums and workshops. Following continued growth and additional funding, the Cork City – Frank O'Connor International Short Story Award was introduced in 2005, coinciding with Cork's designation as that year's European Capital of Culture.

In 2008 there was no shortlist, as the judges considered the winning book, Unaccustomed Earth by Jhumpa Lahiri, superior to other books on the longlist.

The award was discontinued in 2016.

== Recipients ==
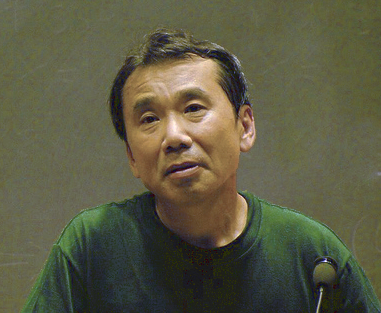
Haruki Murakami

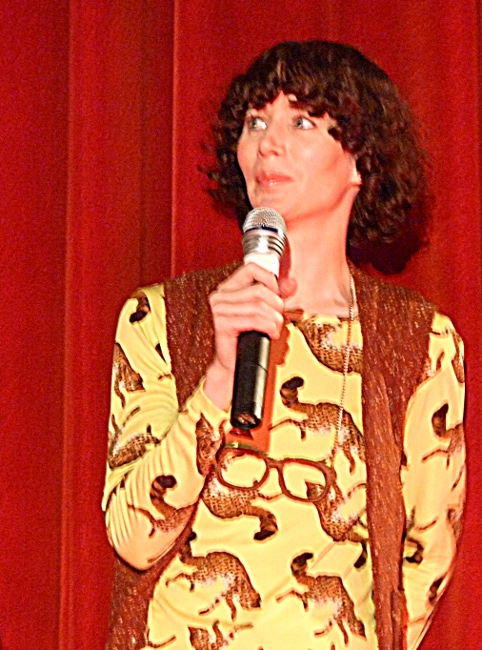
Miranda July

Simon Van Booy

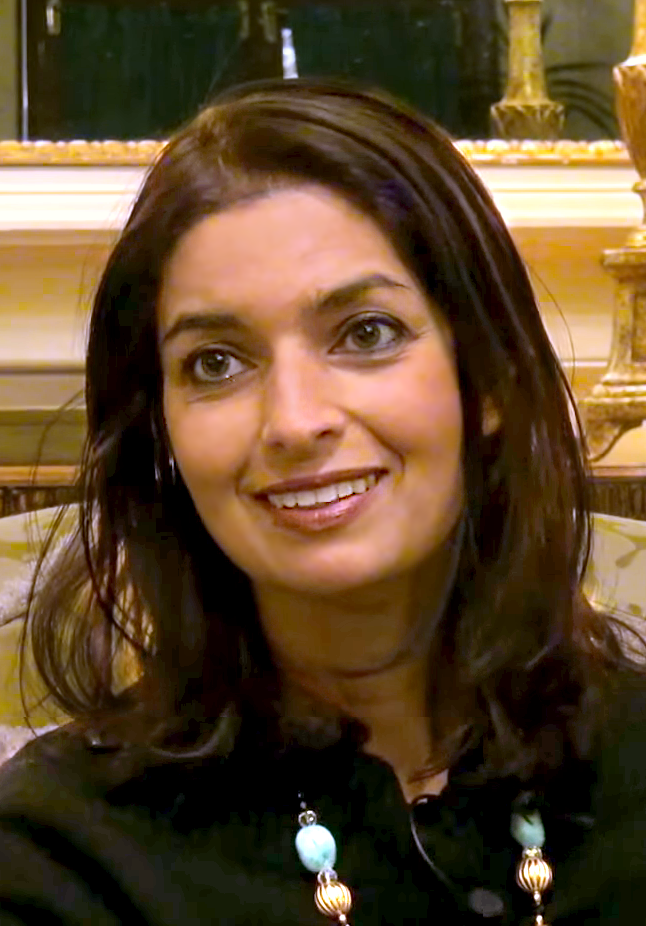
Jhumpa Lahiri

Award recipients
Year	Author	Title	Result	Ref.
2005	Yiyun Li	A Thousand Years of Good Prayers	Winner	
2005	Alice Hoffman	Blackbird House	Shortlist	
2005	Bret Anthony Johnston	Corpus Christi	Shortlist	
2005	David Bezmozgis	Natasha and Other Stories	Shortlist	
2005	David Means	The Secret Goldfish	Shortlist	
2005	Tim Winton	The Turning	Shortlist	
2006	Haruki Murakami	Blind Willow, Sleeping Woman	Winner	
2006	Peter Stamm	In Strange Gardens and Other Stories	Shortlist	
2006	Philip Ó Ceallaigh	Notes from a Turkish Whorehouse	Shortlist	
2006	Rachel Sherman	The First Hurt	Shortlist	
2006	Rose Tremain	The Darkness of Wallis Simpson	Shortlist	
2006	Samrat Upadhyay	The Royal Ghosts	Shortlist	
2007	Miranda July	No One Belongs Here More than You	Winner	
2007	Charlotte Grimshaw	Opportunity	Shortlist	
2007	Etgar Keret	Missing Kissinger	Shortlist	
2007	Manuel Muñoz	The Faith Healer of Olive Avenue	Shortlist	
2007	Olaf Olafsson	Valentines	Shortlist	
2007	Simon Robson	The Separate Heart and Other Stories	Shortlist	
2008 (Note: No shortlist was issued.)	Jhumpa Lahiri	Unaccustomed Earth	Winner	
2009	Simon Van Booy	Love Begins in Winter	Winner	
2009	Charlotte Grimshaw	Singularity	Shortlist	
2009	Petina Gappah	An Elegy for Easterly	Shortlist	
2009	Philip Ó Ceallaigh	The Pleasant Light of Day	Shortlist	
2009	Shih-Li Kow	Ripples and Other Stories	Shortlist	
2009	Wells Tower	Everything Ravaged, Everything Burned	Shortlist	
2010	Ron Rash	Burning Bright	Winner	
2010	Belle Boggs	Mattaponi Queen	Shortlist	
2010	David Constantine	The Shieling	Shortlist	
2010	Laura van den Berg	What the World Will Look Like When All the Water Leaves Us	Shortlist	
2010	Robin Black	If I Loved You I Would Tell You This	Shortlist	
2010	T. C. Boyle	Wild Child	Shortlist	
2011	Edna O'Brien	Saints and Sinners	Winner	
2011	Alexander MacLeod	Light Lifting	Shortlist	
2011	Colm Tóibín	The Empty Family	Shortlist	
2011	Suzanne Rivecca	Death Is Not an Option	Shortlist	
2011	Valerie Trueblood	Marry or Burn	Shortlist	
2011	Yiyun Li	Gold Boy, Emerald Girl	Shortlist	
2012	Nathan Englander	What We Talk About When We Talk About Anne Frank	Winner	
2012	Etgar Keret	Suddenly a Knock on the Door	Shortlist	
2012	Fiona Kidman	The Trouble with Fire	Shortlist	
2012	Kevin Barry	Dark Lies the Island	Shortlist	
2012	Lucia Perillo	Happiness Is a Chemical in the Brain	Shortlist	
2012	Sarah Hall	The Beautiful Indifference	Shortlist	
2013	David Constantine	Tea at the Midland and Other Stories	Winner	
2013	Claire Vaye Watkins	Battleborn	Shortlist	
2013	Deborah Levy	Black Vodka	Shortlist	
2013	Joyce Carol Oates	Black Dahlia & White Rose	Shortlist	
2013	Peter Stamm	We're Flying	Shortlist	
2013	Tamas Dobozy	Siege 13	Shortlist	
2014	Colin Barrett	Young Skins	Winner	
2014	A. L. Kennedy	All the Rage	Shortlist	
2014	Ben Marcus	Leaving the Sea	Shortlist	
2014	Laura van den Berg	The Isle of Youth	Shortlist	
2014	Lorrie Moore	Bark	Shortlist	
2014	Phil Klay	Redeployment	Shortlist	
2015	Carys Davies	The Redemption of Galen Pike	Winner	
2015	Alejandro Zambra	My Documents	Shortlist	
2015	Karen Bender	Refund	Shortlist	
2015	Kirsty Gunn	Infidelities	Shortlist	
2015	Thomas McGuane	Crow Fair	Shortlist	
2015	Tony Earley	Mr. Tall	Shortlist	

== See also ==
- Irish short stories, detailing the importance of the short story form in Irish culture
