= Dark Lies the Island =

Short story collection by Kevin Barry

First edition (publ. Jonathan Cape)

Dark Lies the Island is the second short story collection by Irish writer Kevin Barry. His previous short story collection, There Are Little Kingdoms, won the Rooney Prize for Irish Literature.

It was shortlisted for the Frank O'Connor International Short Story Award.

Barry also wrote the script for a film of the same title about "characters in a long standing family feud in a small Irish town", which was released in October 2019.
