= Carys Davies =

British novelist

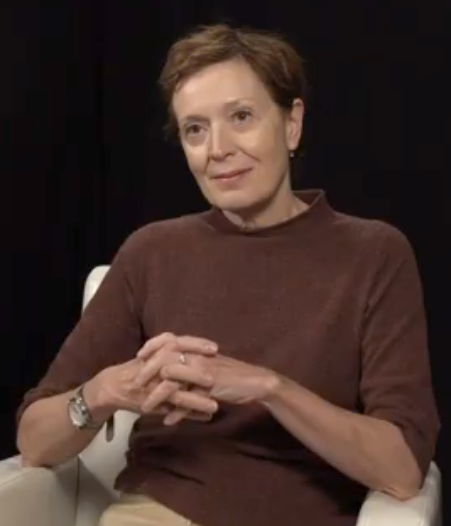
- In a 2025 interview
- Born: Llangollen, North Wales
- Occupation: Novelist
- Notable work: The Redemption of Galen Pike (2014), West (2018), The Mission House (2020), Clear (2024)
- Website: www.carysdavies.net

Carys Davies is a British novelist and short story writer. She has won the Frank O'Connor International Short Story Award, the Wales Book of the Year Fiction Award, the Jerwood Fiction Uncovered Prize, the Royal Society of Literature V.S. Pritchett Short Story Prize, the Society of Authors Olive Cook Short Story award, and the Ondaatje Prize. She has been shortlisted for The Writers' Prize and Scotland's National Book Awards and was runner-up for the McKitterick Prize.

== Life and education ==
Davies was born in Llangollen, north Wales, and grew up in Newport, south Wales, and in the Midlands, England.

Davies studied modern languages at St Anne's College, Oxford, and worked as a freelance journalist in New York and Chicago before moving to Lancaster, Lancashire. She currently lives in Edinburgh, Scotland.

== Career ==
Davies published her debut, a collection of short stories, Some New Ambush, in 2007. It was shortlisted for the Roland Mathias Prize and was a runner up for the Calvino Prize.

Her second collection, The Redemption of Galen Pike (2014), won the Frank O'Connor International Short Story Award and the Jerwood Fiction Uncovered Prize. The title story won the Royal Society of Literature V.S. Pritchett Short Story Prize in 2011. Another story from the collection, "The Quiet", won the Society of Authors Olive Cook Short Story award in 2010. A third story from the collection, "In the Cabin in the Woods", was shortlisted for the Manchester Fiction Prize in 2013.

Davies published her first novel, West, in 2018. The story of a settler searching for dinosaur bones west of the Mississippi and of his daughter left at home in Pennsylvania, it was shortlisted for The Writers' Prize (then called the Rathbones Folio Prize) and runner-up for the McKitterick Prize. It won the Wales Book of the Year Fiction Award.

Davies's second novel, The Mission House, was published in 2020. Set in a south Indian mission house, it tells the story of a middle-aged librarian searching for a fresh start. It was selected for the Wales Literature Exchange bookshelf for 2020-2021 and was the Sunday Times Novel of the Year for 2020.

Davies published her third novel, Clear, in 2024. Set at the time of the Highland Clearances, it tells the story of a minister sent to a remote Scottish island to evict its last inhabitant. In 2024, it won the Bookmark Festival Book of the Year and was shortlisted for Scotland's National Book Awards Scottish Fiction Book of the Year, the Historical Writers' Association Gold Crown Award, and the Fiction category of the Books Are My Bag Readers' Awards. In 2025, the novel was longlisted for the Highland Book Prize and the Walter Scott Prize for Historical Fiction. It won the 2025 Ondaatje Prize. In her Ondaatje acceptance speech, Davies paid tribute to the Faroese linguist Jakob Jakobsen for his work on the Norn language of Shetland.

Davies has also won a Northern Writers' Award for fiction and a Cullman Fellowship at the New York Public Library. She is a member of the Folio Academy and a Fellow of the Royal Society of Literature.

== Works ==
=== Short stories ===
- —— (2007). Some New Ambush. Salt Publishing. ISBN 9781844713417.
- —— (2014). The Redemption of Galen Pike. Salt Publishing. ISBN 9781907773716.

=== Novels ===
- —— (2018). West. Granta Books. ISBN 9781783784226.
- —— (2020). The Mission House. Granta Books. ISBN 9781783784301.
- —— (2024). Clear. Granta Books. ISBN 9781803510408.
