= Jessie Greengrass =

British author (born 1982)

Jessie Greengrass (born 1982) is a British author. She won a Somerset Maugham Award and the Edge Hill Short Story Prize for her debut short story collection An Account of the Decline Of The Great Auk, According To One Who Saw It.

== Education and career ==
Greengrass studied philosophy in Cambridge and London and now lives in Berwick-upon-Tweed.

She published a collection of short stories called An Account of the Decline of the Great Auk in 2015. The Independent described the collection as "a highly original collection from a distinctive new voice in fiction." It won the Somerset Maugham Award and the Edge Hill Short Story Prize.

In 2018, she published her first novel, called Sight. It follows a woman, who stays nameless throughout the novel, while she is pregnant with her second child. Greengrass includes biographical stories of several people including the Lumière brothers, Sigmund Freud, Wilhelm Röntgen and John Hunter, to highlight the book's central themes of reflection and analysis. Sight was shortlisted for the 2018 Women's Prize for Fiction, longlisted for the 2019 Wellcome Book Prize and shortlisted for the 2019 James Tait Black Memorial Prize.

Her second novel, The High House, was published in April 2021. It follows an unconventional family as they survive a climate apocalypse in a house prepared by the mother, a climate scientist and activist, who knows the floods are coming but does not survive them. It was shortlisted for the 2021 the Costa Novel Award, the Royal Society of Literature's Encore Award, and the Orwell Prize for Political Writing.

== Bibliography ==
=== Short story collection ===
- An Account of the Decline of the Great Auk, According to One Who Saw It (2015)

=== Novels ===
- Sight (2018)
- The High House (2021)
