= Riptide (book series) =

- Edited by: Ginny Baily, Sally Flint
- Country: United Kingdom
- Genre: British literature
- Publisher: Dirt Pie Press, University of Exeter
- Published in English: 2007

Riptide is a series of short story anthologies published by Dirt Pie Press, based within the University of Exeter. The founding editors are Ginny Baily and Sally Flint. The journal includes submissions from writers that are both previously published and unpublished. Notable authors whose work has appeared in previous editions include Michael Morpurgo, Helen Dunmore, and Philip Hensher.
