= Kevin Barry (writer) =

Irish writer

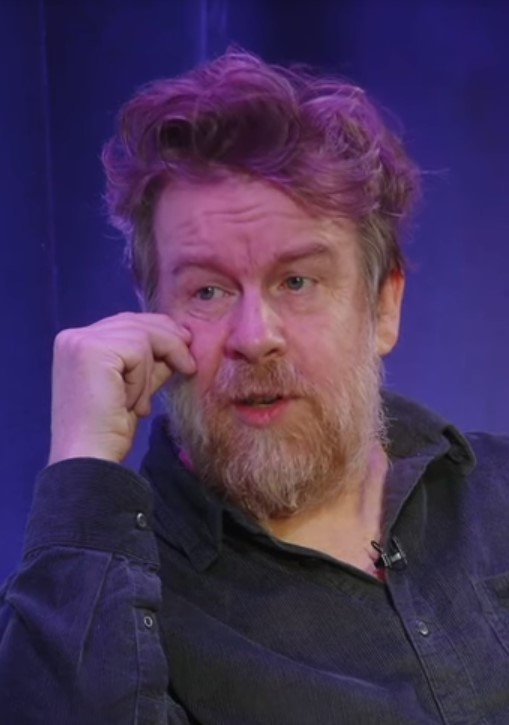
- Barry in November 2024
- Born: 1 December 1969 (age 56); Limerick, Ireland
- Occupation: Writer
- Notable work: City of Bohane; Beatlebone; Night Boat to Tangier
- Awards: Rooney Prize (2007); Sunday Times Award (2011); Dublin Lit Award (2013); Goldsmiths Prize (2015)

Kevin Barry (born 1 December 1969) is an Irish writer. He is the author of three collections of short stories and four novels. City of Bohane (2011) was the winner of the 2013 International Dublin Literary Award, the world's most valuable annual literary fiction prize for books published in English. Beatlebone (2015) won the 2015 Goldsmiths Prize and his 2019 novel Night Boat to Tangier was longlisted for the 2019 Booker Prize. Barry is also an editor of Winter Papers, an arts and culture annual.

== Biography ==
Born in Limerick, Barry spent much of his youth travelling, living in 17 addresses by the time he was 36. He lived variously in Cork, Santa Barbara, Barcelona, and Liverpool before settling in Sligo, purchasing and renovating a run-down Royal Irish Constabulary barracks. His decision to settle down was driven primarily by the increasing difficulty in moving large quantities of books from house to house. In Cork Barry worked as a freelance journalist, contributing a regular column to the Irish Examiner. Keen to become a writer, he purchased a caravan and parked it in a field in West Cork, spending the next six months writing what he described as a "terrible novel".

Barry has described himself as "a raving egomaniac", one of those "monstrous creatures who are composed 99 percent of sheer, unadulterated ego" and "hugely insecure and desperate to be loved and I want my reader to adore me, to a disturbing, stalkerish degree." He is highly ambitious, saying: "I won't be happy until I'm up there, receiving the Nobel Prize". He confessed to "haunting bookshops and hiding" to "spy on the short fiction section and see if anyone's tempted by my sweet bait" and has also placed copies of his own work in front of books by other "upcoming" authors.

In 2007 he won the Rooney Prize for Irish Literature for his short story collection There Are Little Kingdoms (2007). In 2011 he released his debut novel City of Bohane, which was followed in 2012 by the short story collection Dark Lies the Island. Barry won the International Dublin Literary Award for his novel City of Bohane in 2013. When City of Bohane was shortlisted for the award in April 2013, Barry said: "Anything that keeps a book in the spotlight and keeps people talking about books is good. [...] And a prize with money attached to it has a lot of prestige." He received €100,000 for winning the award. The prize jury included Salim Bachi, Krista Kaer, Patrick McCabe, Kamila Shamsie, Clive Sinclair and Eugene R. Sullivan. Lord Mayor of Dublin Naoise Ó Muirí said he was "thrilled" that someone of "such immense talent [should] take home this year's award". Ó Muirí also said the characters were "flamboyant and malevolent, speaking in a vernacular like no other." In November 2015 Beatlebone won the £10,000 Goldsmiths Prize that aims to reward British and Irish fiction that breaks the mould or extends the possibilities of the novel form.

The Gazette described him as: "If Roddy Doyle and Nick Cave could procreate, the result would be something like Kevin Barry."

Barry was the Ireland Fund Artist-in-Residence in the Celtic Studies Department of University of St. Michael's College at the University of Toronto in October 2010.

== Awards and honours ==
=== Literary awards ===
Year	Work	Award	Category	Result	Ref
2007	There Are Little Kingdoms	Rooney Prize for Irish Literature	—	Won	
2011	City of Bohane	Costa Book Award	First Novel	Shortlisted	
2012	Beer Trip to Llandudno	Sunday Times EFG Private Bank Short Story Award	—	Won	
2012	City of Bohane	Authors' Club Best First Novel Award	—	Won	
2013	City of Bohane	International Dublin Literary Award	—	Won	
2013	Dark Lies the Island	Edge Hill University Short Story Prize	—	Won	
2015	Beatlebone	Goldsmiths Prize	—	Won	
2019	Night Boat to Tangier	International Dublin Literary Award	—	Longlisted	
2022	That Old Country Music	Edge Hill University Short Story Prize	—	Won	
2025	The Heart in Winter	Walter Scott Prize	—	Shortlisted	

=== Honours ===
- 2020: Elected member of Aosdána

== Bibliography ==
=== Novels ===
- City of Bohane (2011)
- Beatlebone (2015)
- Night Boat to Tangier (2019)
- The Heart in Winter (2024)

=== Plays ===
- The Cave (2025)

=== Short story collections ===
- There Are Little Kingdoms (2007)
- Dark Lies the Island (2012)
- That Old Country Music (2020)

=== Short stories ===
Year	Title	First published	Reprinted/collected	Notes
2016	Deer Season	Barry, Kevin (10 October 2016). "Deer Season". The New Yorker. Vol. 92, no. 32. pp. 84–89.	That Old Country Music	
2018	The Coast of Leitrim	Barry, Kevin (15 October 2018). "The Coast of Leitrim". The New Yorker. Vol. 94, no. 32. pp. 70–75.	That Old Country Music	
2022	The Pub with No Beer	Barry, Kevin (11 April 2022). "The Pub with No Beer". The New Yorker. Vol. 98, no. 8. pp. 50–52.		
2024	Finistère	Barry, Kevin (8 April 2024). "F". The New Yorker.		
