= Opium den =

Establishment where opium is sold and smoked

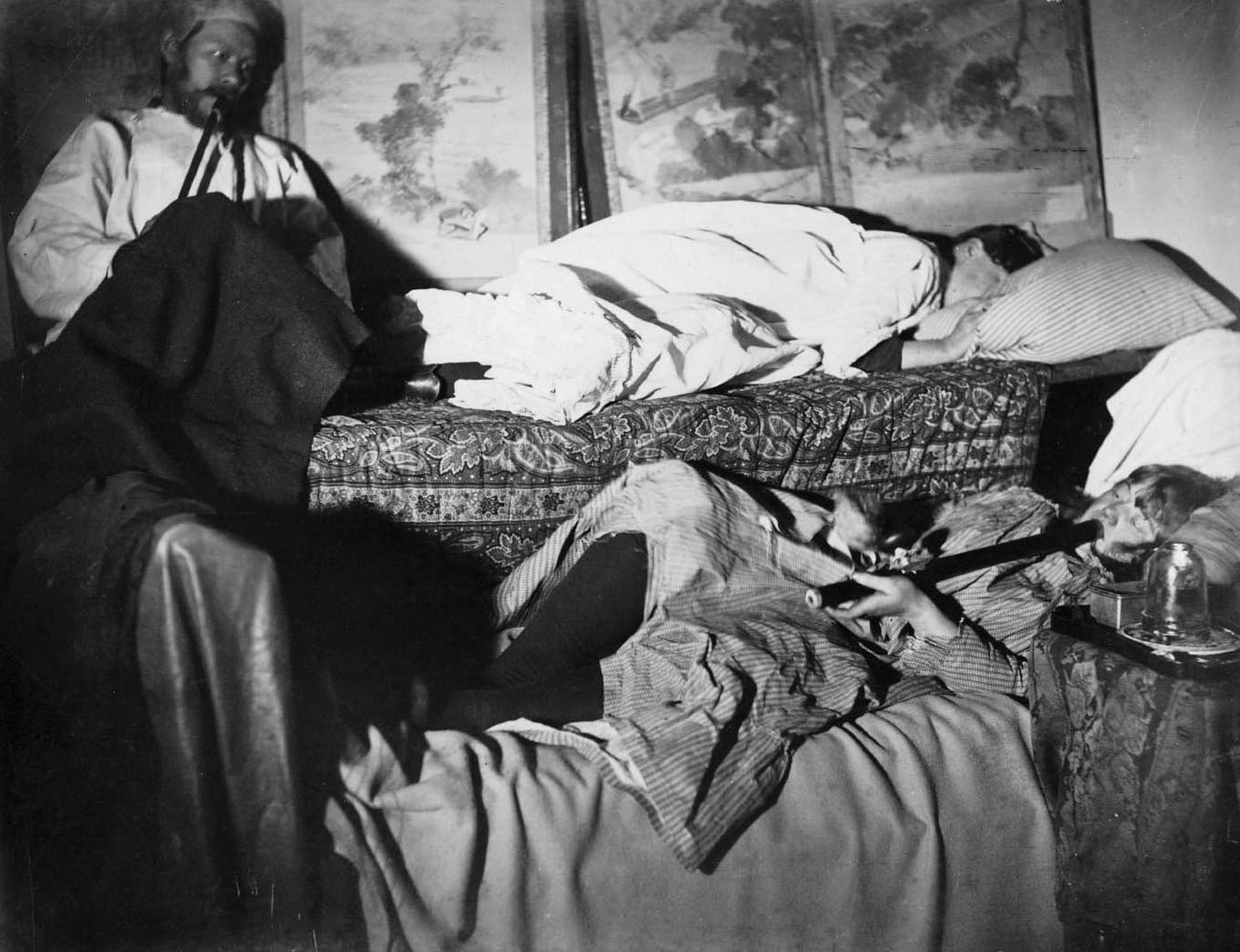
Two women and a man smoking in an opium den, late 19th century

An opium den was an establishment in which opium was sold and smoked. Opium dens were prevalent in many parts of the world in the 19th century, most notably China, Southeast Asia, North America, and France. Throughout the West, opium dens were frequented by, and associated with the Chinese because the establishments were usually run by Chinese mobsters, who supplied the opium and prepared it for visiting non-Chinese smokers. Most opium dens kept a supply of opium paraphernalia such as the pipes and lamps that were necessary to smoke the drug. Patrons would recline to hold the long opium pipes over oil lamps that would heat the drug until it vaporized, allowing the smoker to inhale the vapors. Opium dens in China were frequented by all levels of society, and their opulence or simplicity reflected the financial means of the patrons. In urban areas of the United States, particularly on the West Coast, there were opium dens that mirrored the best to be found in China, with luxurious trappings and female attendants. For the working class, there were many low-end dens with sparse furnishings.

== Australia ==
In the 19th to early 20th centuries, opium smoking and opium dens were notably present in areas like Chinatowns in Australian cities such as Melbourne, Brisbane, and Mackay. For instance, in Mackay's old Chinatown, opium dens were commonly visited by people of various ethnic backgrounds.

== United States ==
=== San Francisco ===
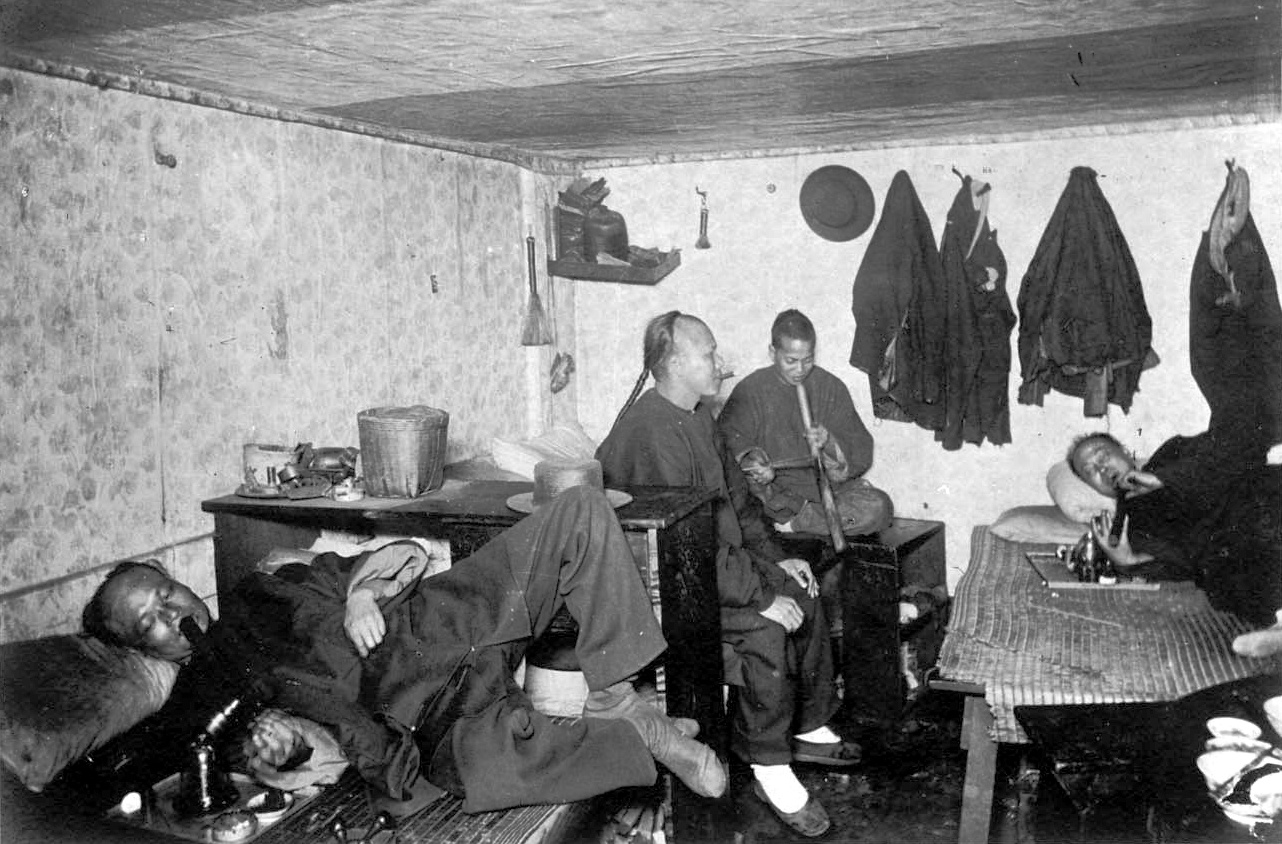
Opium den in San Francisco boarding house, late 19th century

Opium smoking arrived in North America with the large influx of Chinese, who came to participate in the California Gold Rush. The jumping-off point for the gold fields was San Francisco, and the city's Chinatown became the site of numerous opium dens soon after the first Chinese arrived, around 1850. Some immigrants have stated they smoked opium to provide a mental escape from the loneliness and prejudice they experienced from living in a foreign environment. However, from 1863 to the end of the century, anti-vice laws imposed by the new municipal code book banned visiting opium rooms in addition to prostitution. Despite this, the 1870s attracted many non-Chinese residents to San Francisco's dens, prompting the city fathers to enact the nation's first anti-drug law, an 1875 ordinance banning opium dens. Other states followed suit, and by 1896, twenty-two states had prohibited opium dens. In the early 20th century, huge bonfires, fueled by confiscated opium and opium paraphernalia, were used to destroy opium and create a public venue to discuss opium use.

Opium-eradication campaigns drove opium smoking underground, but it was still fairly common in San Francisco and other North American cities until around World War II. A typical opium den in San Francisco might have been a Chinese-run laundry that had a basement, back room, or upstairs room that was tightly sealed to keep drafts from making the opium lamps flicker or allowing the tell-tale opium fumes to escape. Opium dens were sometimes described in fiction as sprawling maze-like networks underneath businesses. A photograph of one luxurious opium den in 19th-century San Francisco has survived, taken by I. W. Taber in 1886, but the majority of the city's wealthy opium smokers, both Chinese and non-Chinese, shunned public opium dens in favor of smoking in the privacy of their own homes.

However, as dens began to open up in "respectable" neighborhoods, the city witnessed an increase in communal smoking and a growing tendency for more middle and upper class white Americans to partake in opium use. An 1881 interview of police officer James Mahoney appearing in the San Francisco Chronicle affirms these developments. He observed that a majority of white smokers had previously been "hoodlums and prostitutes," but with the rise of "clean" dens, the habit of smoking opium soon extended further up the social hierarchy.

=== New York City ===
The opium dens of New York City's Chinatown were not as opulent as some of those to be found on the American West Coast. According to H. H. Kane, a doctor who spent years studying opium use in New York in the 1870s and 1880s, the most popular opium dens (or "opium joints" as they were known in the parlance of the day) were located on Mott and Pell Streets in Chinatown. At the time, all the city's opium dens were run by Chinese, except for one on 23rd Street that was run by an American woman and her two daughters. Kane remarked that New York's opium dens were one place "where all nationalities seem indiscriminately mixed".

As in San Francisco, New Yorkers of all races would come to Chinatown to patronize its opium dens. New York City's last known opium den was raided and shut down on June 28, 1957.

== Canada ==
Chinese immigrants first established Chinatowns in Victoria and Vancouver in British Columbia, and here too, opium dens were common in the late 19th and early 20th centuries. When the city of San Francisco began taxing imported opium for smoking, the trade was diverted to Victoria, and, from there, much of the opium was smuggled south into the United States. However, a fair amount of opium was consumed in the opium dens to be found in the Chinatowns of Victoria and Vancouver. The latter city's "Shanghai Alley" was known for its rustic opium dens. As in the United States, non-Chinese often frequented the Chinese-run opium dens in Canadian Chinatowns.

== France ==
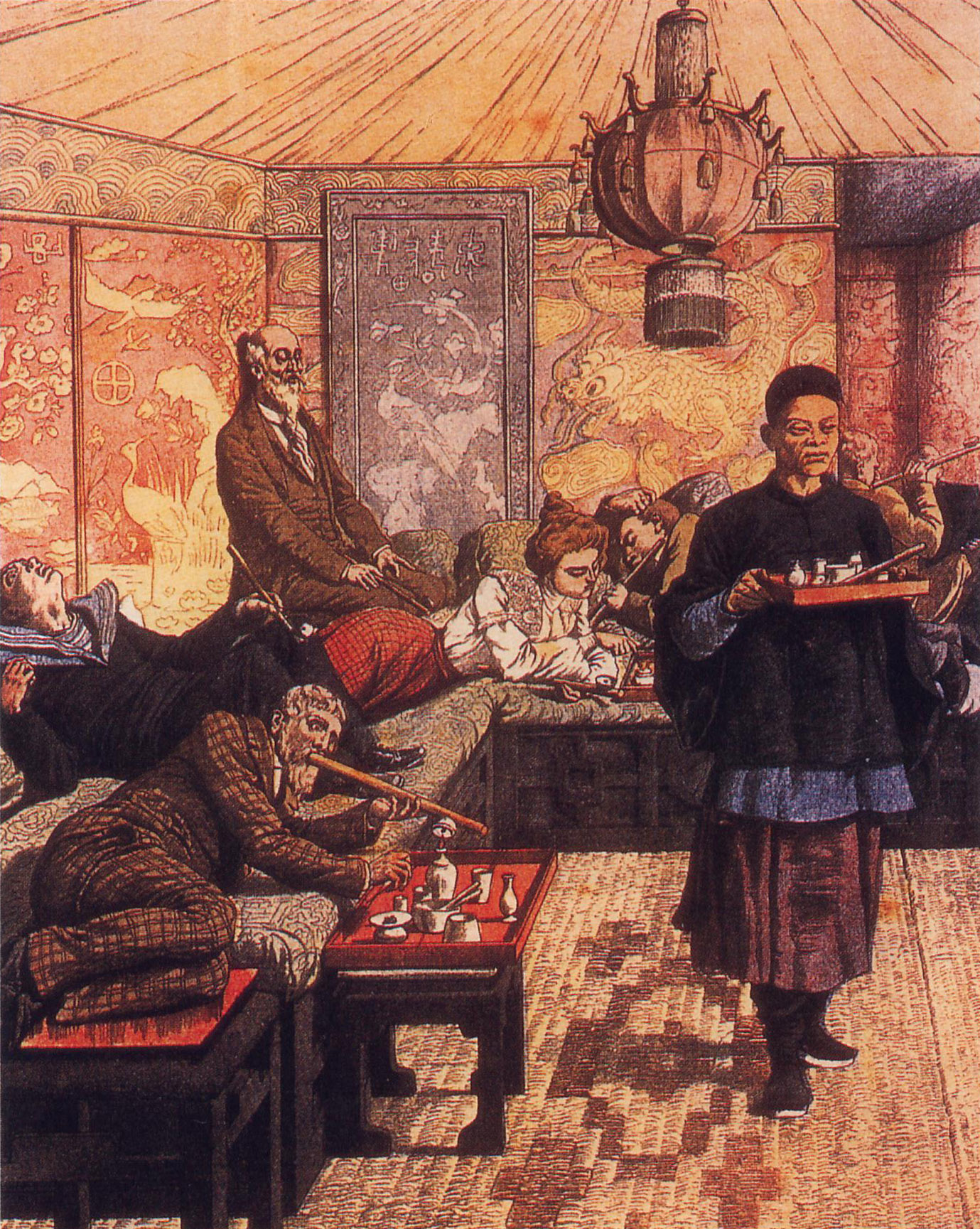
"A New Vice: Opium Dens in France", an illustration from Le Petit Journal, 5 July 1903

Opium smoking in France was introduced for the most part by French expatriates returning home from stints in their Indochinese colonies. By the early 20th century, there were numerous opium dens in France's port cities, particularly Toulon, Marseille and Hyères.

== London ==
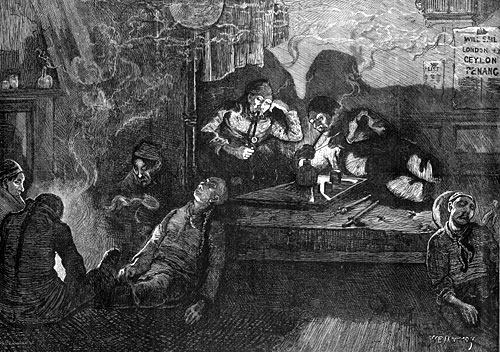
Drawing of opium smokers in an opium den in London based on fictional accounts of the day

Victorian London's reputation as a centre of opium smoking is based on literary fiction rather than historical fact. The London press, along with popular British authors of the day, were fond of portraying London's Limehouse district as an opium-drenched pit of danger and mystery. In British fiction, Chinese characters and their association with opium dens were used to create an exotic atmosphere, often representing corruption and criminality. However, London's Chinese population never exceeded the low hundreds, in large contrast to the tens of thousands of Chinese who settled in North American Chinatowns. In the mid-1880s, Chinatowns started to form in London and Liverpool with grocery stores, eating houses and meeting places. There were even streets in the East End of London that were given Chinese names. In 1891, the Census recorded 582 Chinese-born residents in Britain, though this dropped to 387 in 1896. 80% were single males between 20 and 35, the majority being seamen. Companies began to export opium from India to China, selling the drug to raise the money to buy shipments of tea. This was against Chinese law and angered China's authorities. In 1839, war broke out between Britain and China over the opium trade. Britain defeated China and under the terms of the Treaty of Nanking in 1842, Hong Kong became a British colony. The treaty also forced China to open their ports to foreign trade, which included opium. In 1857, the Second Opium War resulted in the Treaties of Tianjin which included a clause allowing Britain and France to recruit Chinese to the British Colonies, North America, South America, and Australia as cheap labour. However, Britain did not recruit as many workers as North America, where the Chinese were employed on the construction of the Transcontinental Railroad, and where many Chinese immigrated in search of fortune during the gold rush, thus the Chinese communities were much smaller in Britain. The Chinese immigrants to London often arrived in the East London ports by boat, such as the Blue Funnel Line. Most of them were seamen, and many would have settled in only a few select streets. When jobs on the docks and on boats dried up, many Chinese turned to other businesses, such as the restaurants or laundries.

In the 1860s, "Dark England" with its opium dens in London's East End was described in popular press and books, various individuals and religious organisations began to campaign against unrestricted opium trafficking. At Pennyfields there was a Christian Mission for the Chinese and a Confucian temple. At Limehouse Causeway there was the famous Ah Tack's lodging house. There was much prejudice against the East End Chinese community, with much of it initiated by the writings of Thomas Burke and Sax Rohmer. Both of these men wrote about the Chinese community. Burke and Ward exaggerated the Chinese community's true size and made much mention of gambling, opium dens, and "unholy things" in the shadows. A character from Charles Dickens' last novel, The Mystery of Edwin Drood (1870) sets the scene: "O my poor head! I makes my pipes of old penny ink-bottles, ye see, deary – this is one – and I fits-in a mouthpiece, this way, and I takes my mixter out of this thimble with this little horn spoon; and so I fills, deary. Ah, my poor nerves!"

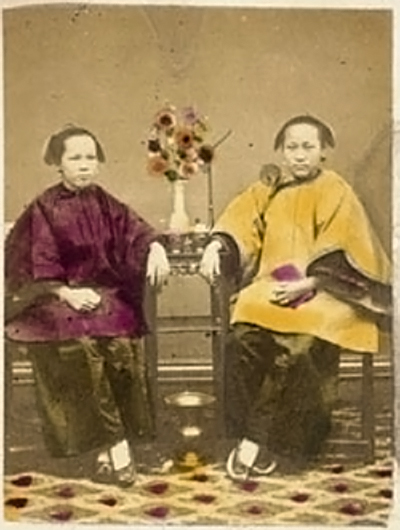
Photograph of two women outside Ah Sing's Opium den from the London Science Museum

Dickens is famous for his portrayal and caricature of nineteenth-century London. So it is significant that he has immortalised this opium den in east London, identifying it as part of the fabric-weave of Victorian London. The establishment "run by the Chinaman" described in The Mystery of Edwin Drood, was based on a real opium den. It was run by Ah Sing, or John Johnston as he was known to his clients, an immigrant from Amoy in China. Rare photographs of the Chinese opium scene in East London do exist. A photograph held at the Science Museum in London shows two Chinese women outside Ah Sing's opium den. Ah Sing was a smoker himself, and it was claimed that only he had the "true secret of mixing opium ... with an eye to business". His secret evidently brought him much success, as his den was frequented by the local Chinese sailors on a break from working on the ships, but also others. Some literary elite of the time including Arthur Conan Doyle (see "The Man with the Twisted Lip") and Dickens himself visited the area, although whether they themselves took up the "pipe" has remained undisclosed. Ah Sing's opium den was probably the most famous of the dens in Victorian London, attracting gentlemen from the very elite of London's high society.

In 1868, the Pharmacy Act recognised dangerous drugs and limited their sale to registered chemists and pharmacists, but until the end of the nineteenth century few doctors and scientists warned about the dangers of drug addiction. When the small number of opium dens gradually declined in London, following crackdowns from the authorities, individuals like Ah Sing were forced to move from their properties, and had to find alternative ways of making a living. In his latter days, it was said that he continued to smoke, despite finding religion. He did eventually manage to give up opium smoking, though only days before he died around 1890, aged 64. He is now buried in Bow Cemetery.

== In popular culture ==
=== Anime and manga ===
- In the anime and manga Kuroshitsuji, one of the main side characters, Lau, owns an opium den.

=== Film ===
- In the film Once Upon a Time in America (1984), the character David "Noodles" Aaronson (Robert De Niro) frequents an opium den.
- In the film Tombstone (1993), the character William Brocius aka Curly Bill Brocius (played by Powers Boothe), is seen smoking opium in an Old West opium den before exiting to the street and shooting the town marshal, Fred White. In reality, Curly Bill was intoxicated by alcohol rather than opium.
- In the film Wild Bill (1995), Wild Bill Hickok, played by Jeff Bridges, frequents an opium den in Deadwood. His sessions with the pipe are often the trigger for hallucinogenic flashbacks.
- In the film adaptation of From Hell (2001), the main character, Inspector Fred Abberline, played by Johnny Depp, frequents opium dens.
- The film Gangs of New York (2002) portrayed rival political ward bosses in search of fraudulent voters rousting Chinese immigrants from an opium den in the Five Points neighborhood of Manhattan, in the 1860s.
- In the film Rouge (1987), the main character, Fleur, played by Anita Mui, is a courtesan working in a 1930s bordello and opium den, where she meets the wealthy Twelve Master Chen, played by Leslie Cheung.
- The ending of the film McCabe & Mrs. Miller has Constance Miller, played by Julie Christie, sedated in an opium den while McCabe, played by Warren Beatty, dies unnoticed after being shot.

=== Music ===
- ”The Card Cheat” on the album London Calling by The Clash has a lyric referencing opium dens.
- ”Down Under” on the album Business as Usual by Men at Work has a lyric referring to a (opium) 'den in Bombay', also visualized in the music video.

=== Literature ===
- In Agatha Christie's magazine short story "The Lost Mine"(1923), Hercule Poirot is forced, much against his will, to conduct part of his investigation in a Limehouse opium den. The story appeared in book form in the American version of Poirot Investigates (1925) and in the UK in Poirot's Early Cases (1974).
- In Cassandra Clare's novel Clockwork Prince, Will visits an opium den where a faerie version of the drug is smoked. The characters still refer to it as an opium den.
- In Charles Dickens' final and uncompleted novel, The Mystery of Edwin Drood, an opium den is a critical element of the story.
- In Arthur Conan Doyle's Sherlock Holmes story "The Man with the Twisted Lip", Dr. Watson goes to an opium den in the East End of London to find Isa Whitney.
- In Hergé's The Adventures of Tintin story The Blue Lotus (1934–1935), the main character Tintin is involved in infiltrating opium dens.
- Rudyard Kipling's short story "The Gate of a Hundred Sorrows" tells the history of a Chinese opium den in India.
- Michael McDowell's novel Gilded Needles revolves around an opium ring in 1880s New York City and features detailed descriptions of both opium dens and opium paraphernalia, heavily based on historical records and the few photos available.
- In Alan Moore and Kevin O'Neill's graphic novel The League of Extraordinary Gentlemen, Mina Murray finds aged adventurer Allan Quatermain in an opium den. "Singapore Charlie's" den is the setting of their first encounter with the "Devil Doctor".
- In Sax Rohmer's novel The Mystery of Dr. Fu-Manchu (1913), Nayland Smith and Dr Petrie enter Singapore Charlie's Thames-side opium den in search of Dr Fu Manchu and his henchmen.
- In Oscar Wilde's novel, The Picture of Dorian Gray, Dorian visits the opium dens of London when indulging in the pleasures of life whether moral or immoral, having been influenced by the hedonistic outlook on life of Lord Henry Wotton.
- Jeet Thayil's debut novel, Narcopolis (2012), is largely set in an opium den in Old Bombay during the 1970–1990s.
- In Robert E. Howard's 1929 novella, Skull-Face, a Limehouse opium-den called Yun Shatu's Temple of Dreams serves as the main locale for the first half of the story.
- In the 1899–1925 dime novel magazine series Secret Service: Old and Young King Brady, Detectives, opium dens in San Francisco and New York City often serve as sites for criminals to conceal their victims and keep them docile under the influence of the drug.

=== Television ===
- In the Magnum, P.I. episode "Holmes is Where the Heart Is" David Worth takes Higgins to an opium den.
- In Copper season 2, Elizabeth Haverford Morehouse visits an opium den after her husband, Jonathan Morehouse (who'd introduced her to the drug), cuts off her supply in an effort to wean her off the drug.
- In the television drama series The Knick (2014), set in Manhattan in 1900, Clive Owen's character, Dr. John Thackery, is both a cocaine and opium addict, and frequently visits an opium den on Mott Street in Chinatown to get high and enjoy a Chinese prostitute/worker at the den.
- In Boardwalk Empire episode "Nights in Ballygran", Jimmy Darmody is shown smoking opium at an opium den in Chinatown.
- In The Blacklist episode "Cape May", Raymond "Red" Reddington is seen as a patron inside of an opium den in New York City's Chinatown. In previous episodes, he speaks about his previous experiences with opium dens.
- In the Highlander series, immortal Brian Cullen develops a fear of fighting other immortals. He escapes from his fear by smoking opium at opium dens in San Francisco during the Gold Rush.
- The Silicon Valley character Erlich Bachman (portrayed by T.J. Miller) is last seen given a five-year holiday in a Tibetan opium den at Gavin Belson's behest.
- In the Korean TV show Mr. Sunshine, Gu Dong-Mae uses an opium den to rest and recover from his wounds near the show's finale.
- In the Korean TV show Tale of Nine Tailed and Tale of Nine Tailed 1938, Lee Yeon becomes an opium addict in memory of Ah-eum
- In the Netflix TV show Peaky Blinders, the character Thomas Shelby played by Cillian Murphy frequently visits an opium den as a means to cope with his PTSD after WW1.
