= Nicholas Royle =

English writer, editor, publisher and lecturer (born 1963)

- Born: 20 March 1963 (age 63); Manchester, England, United Kingdom
- Occupations: Writer, editor, publisher and lecturer
- Writing career
- Period: (1993–present)
- Genre: Literary fiction/Crime fiction/Horror
- Website: www.nicholasroyle.com

Nicholas John Royle (born 20 March 1963 in Manchester) is an English novelist, editor, publisher, literary reviewer and creative writing lecturer.

== Literary career ==
=== Author ===
Royle has written seven novels: Counterparts, Saxophone Dreams, The Matter of the Heart, The Director’s Cut, Antwerp, Regicide and First Novel. He also claims to have written more than 100 short stories, which have appeared in a variety of anthologies and magazines, including Bad Idea, with his short story Confessions of a Serial Coat Snatcher appearing in the 2008 Bad Idea Anthology. He has written two short-story collections: Mortality and Ornithology.

==== Awards ====
Royle has won a British Fantasy Award three times: Best Anthology in 1992 and 1993 and Best Short Story in 1993. He has been nominated for Best Short Story three further times.

The Matter of the Heart won the Bad Sex in Fiction Award in 1997.

=== Editor ===
As an editor, Royle is best known for having edited The Lighthouse, by Alison Moore, which was shortlisted for the 2012 Man Booker Prize, and The Many by Wyl Menmuir, which was longlisted for the 2016 Man Booker Prize.

He has also edited more than two dozen anthologies including A Book of Two Halves, The Tiger Garden: A Book of Writers’ Dreams, The Time Out Book of New York Short Stories, and Dreams Never End (Tindal Street Press) and several other novels. He has been series editor of Best British Short Stories (Salt) since it launched in 2011.

=== Publisher ===
Royle owns and manages Nightjar Press, which publishes short stories as signed, limited edition, chapbooks. Nightjar Press has published authors including M. John Harrison, Christopher Kenworthy, Joel Lane, Alison Moore and Michael Marshall Smith

== Academic career ==
Royle was a Senior Lecturer and then Reader at the Manchester Writing School at Manchester Metropolitan University from 2006 to 2022, and was Chair of Judges for the Manchester Fiction Prize from its launch in 2009 until he left the university in 2022.

== Bibliography ==
=== Novels ===
- —— (1993). Counterparts. Barrington Books. ISBN 1-897729-02-2.
- —— (1996). Saxophone Dreams. Penguin. ISBN 0-14-024387-9.
- —— (1997). The Matter of the Heart. Abacus. ISBN 0-349-10956-7.
- —— (2001). The Director's Cut. Abacus. ISBN 0-349-11430-7.
- —— (2005). Antwerp. Serpent's Tail. ISBN 9781852427856.
- —— (2011). Regicide. Serpent's Tail. ISBN 978-1-907992-00-1.
- —— (2013). First Novel. Jonathan Cape. ISBN 9780224096980.

=== Novellas ===
- —— (2008). The Enigma of Departure. PS Publishing. ISBN 9781905834204.
- —— (2008). The Appetite. Gray Friar Press. ISBN 9781906331023.

=== Short story collections ===
- —— (2011). Mortality. Serpent's Tail. ISBN 9781852424763.
- —— (2017). Ornithology. Confingo. ISBN 9780995596603.
- —— (2018). The Dummy & Other Uncanny Stories. Swan River Press. ISBN 9781783800223.
- —— (2020). London Gothic. Confingo. ISBN 9780995596665.

=== Non-fiction ===
- —— (2021). White Spines: Confessions of a Book Collector. Salt Publishing. ISBN 9781784632137.
- —— (2024). Shadow Lines: Searching For the Book Beyond the Shelf. Salt Publishing. ISBN 9781784633073.

== Personal life ==
Royle has two children – Charlie and Isabella – and lives in both Manchester and London.

Royle shares his name with Nicholas W. O. Royle (born 1957), an authority on Jacques Derrida, and the author of textbooks, including The Uncanny, and a novel, Quilt. The two writers are often confused with one another.
