= Dream stick =

Dream stick may refer to:

- Vintage slang for opium pipe.
- A variety of ice cream bar manufactured by Cadbury Schweppes
