= Govinden =

Govinden is a given name and surname. Notable people with the name include:

- Niven Govinden (born 1973), English novelist
- Rodney Govinden (born 1984), Seychellois sailor
- Govinden Venkatasami (fl. from 2024), Mauritian politician

== See also ==
- Govinda
