= Leone Ross =

British writer (born 1969)

Leone Ross FRSL
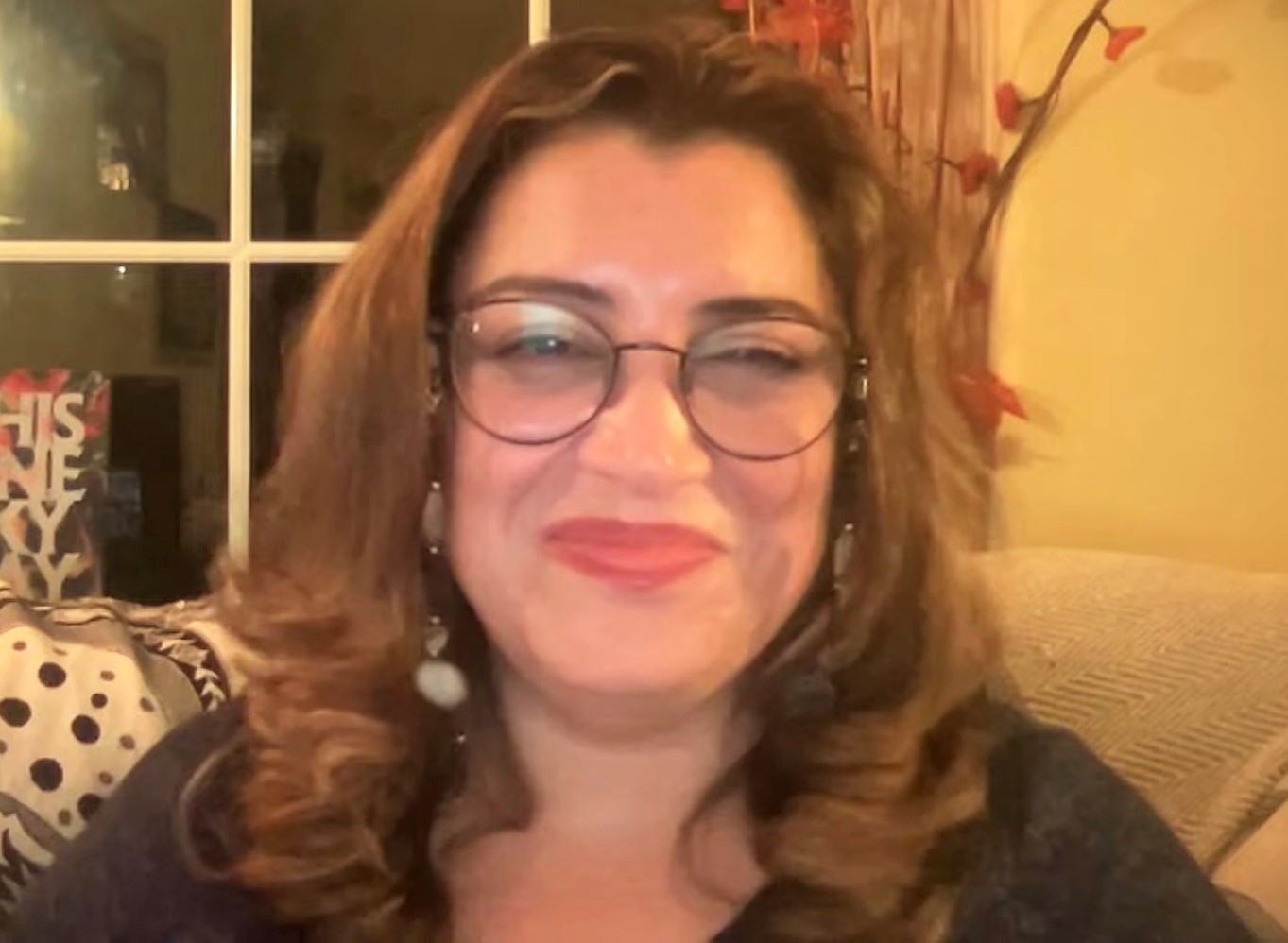
- Ross leads a 2022 discussion for the British Library
- Born: 26 June 1969 (age 57); Coventry, England
- Education: University of the West Indies; City University
- Occupations: Novelist, short story writer, editor, journalist and academic
- Writing career
- Notable work: This One Sky Day (2021)
- Website: www.leoneross.com

Leone Ross FRSL (born 26 June 1969) is a British novelist, short story writer, editor, journalist and academic, who is of Jamaican and Scottish ancestry.

== Biography ==
=== Early years and education ===
Leone Ross was born in Coventry, England. When she was six years old, Ross migrated with her mother to Jamaica, where she was raised and educated. After graduating from the University of the West Indies in 1990, Ross returned to England to do her master's degree in International Journalism at City University, in London, where she now lives.

=== Career ===
Her first novel, All The Blood Is Red, was published by Angela Royal Publishing in 1996. It was nominated for the Orange Prize in 1997. Her second novel, Orange Laughter, was published in the UK by Anchor Press, in the United States by Farrar, Straus & Giroux and Picador, and in France by Actes Sud. Ross's first short-story collection, Come Let Us Sing Anyway, published in 2017 (Peepal Tree Press), was widely acclaimed. Maggie Gee in The Times Literary Supplement characterised Ross as "a pointilliste, a master of detail", and in a review for The Guardian, Bernardine Evaristo described the collection as "remarkable" and "outrageously funny", saying: "Ross writes here with searing empathy and compassion. ...The effect is mesmerising, shocking, unforgettable". The book was described on BBC Radio 4's A Good Read as "incredibly rare, extraordinary".

In 2009, Wasafiri magazine placed Ross's second novel, Orange Laughter, on its list of 25 Most Influential Books from the previous quarter-century. Come Let Us Sing Anyway was nominated for the V.S. Pritchett Prize, Salt Publishing's Scott Prize, the Jhalak Prize and was shortlisted for the 2018 Edge Hill Prize. It was named runner-up Best Collection in the public-voted Saboteur Awards. In 2000, Ross was a recipient of a London Arts Board Writers Award. She has represented the British Council in the United States, South Korea, Slovakia, Romania, Sweden, and across the UK.

In September 2004, Ross was chosen as one of 50 Black and Asian writers who have made major contributions to contemporary British literature, appearing in the historic "A Great Day in London" photograph taken at the British Library.

Her short fiction and essays have been widely anthologised, including in the Brown Sugar erotica series, which zoomed to number three on the Los Angeles Times Bestseller List. Other US collections featuring her work include Dark Matter: A Century of Speculative Fiction from the African Diaspora and The Year's Best Fantasy and Horror (14th Edition). In 2000, she co-edited the award-winning Whispers in The Walls: New Black and Asian Writing from Birmingham. In 2021, she will edit a speculative fiction anthology, by Black British writers, for Peepal Tree Press.

Prior to the publication of her books, Ross worked as a journalist and editor for 14 years. She held the post of Arts Editor at The Voice newspaper, Women's Editor at the New Nation newspaper, and was transitional Editor for Pride magazine in the UK. She also held the position of Deputy Editor at Sibyl, a feminist magazine. She has freelanced for The Independent on Sunday and The Guardian, as well as for London Weekend Television and the BBC.

Ross writes novels and short stories in speculative fiction, erotica, and Caribbean fiction genres. In 2015, she judged the Manchester Fiction Prize, alongside Stuart Kelly. She has judged the Spread the Word London Short Story Prize with agent Emma Paterson, the V. S. Pritchett Award (twice) with novelist Candice Carty-Williams and Philip Hensher, the Mslexia Short Fiction award with novelist Sunny Singh, and for several years, the Wimbledon Bookfest Competition.

Ross is a contributor to the 2019 anthology New Daughters of Africa, edited by Margaret Busby, and the 2020 anthology Outsiders edited by Alice Slater. In 2021, Ross released This One Sky Day and—during an interview in which she discussed her novel—Ross revealed that she is bisexual and that she "...often felt like I'm sitting in the middle...". Described as "an exuberant work of magical realism that was 15 years in the making", This One Sky Day was shortlisted for the 2021 Goldsmiths Prize and was included on the longlist for the 2022 Women's Prize for Fiction.

Ross has worked at Cardiff University, Trinity College Dublin, the City Literary Institute and the Arvon Foundation, and was Senior Lecturer in the Creative Writing department at Roehampton University in London, where she was Anthology Editor for their micro-publishing house, Fincham Press. She is a Senior Fellow of the UK Higher Education Academy.

In 2023, Ross was elected a Fellow of the Royal Society of Literature.

== Works ==
=== Novels ===
- This One Sky Day (UK: Faber & Faber, 2021; published as Popisho by Farrar Straus & Giroux, USA)
- Orange Laughter (Picador USA, 2001; Actes Sud, France, 2001; Farrar Straus & Giroux, USA, 2000; Anchor Press, UK, 2000; Angela Royal Publishing, UK, 1999)
- All the Blood Is Red (Actes Sud, France, 2002; Angela Royal Publishing, UK, 1996)

=== Collections ===
- Come Let Us Sing Anyway and other stories (Leeds, UK: Peepal Tree Press, 2017)

=== Short stories ===
- "Headache" in A Cage Went In Search Of A Bird: Ten Kafkaesque Short Stories (UK: Abacus, May 2024)
- "When We Went Gallivanting" in Best British Short Stories 2023, ed. Nicholas Royle (UK: Salt, Oct 2023)
- “Peep Hole” in Outsiders , ed. Alice Slater (UK: Three Of Cups, July 2020)
- "Why You Shouldn't Take Yourself So Seriously" in New Daughters of Africa, ed. Margaret Busby (UK: Myriad Editions, March 2019, paperback July 2020).
- "President Daisy" reprinted in The Peepal Tree Book of Contemporary Caribbean Short Stories, eds Jeremy Poynting & Jacob Ross (UK: Peepal Tree Press, December 2018).
- "Meat-Kind" in The Mechanics Institute Review, Issue 15 (Birkbeck University, 2018).
- "Ecdysis" commissioned by The British Council as part of their Discover project – brings together BC UK and BC Turkey, June 2018.
- "Adulting" commissioned by Spread The Word London. Ross was one of their City Of Stories Writers in Residence in 2018. Published in their City of Stories, Volume 2, September 2018.
- "Carousel” in Pree magazine, ed. Annie Paul, Jamaica: Issue 1: Crossroads (Jamaica, April 2018)
- "The Woman Who Lived In A Restaurant" originally published as a limited edition chapbook by UK: Nightjar Press, ed. Nicholas Royle, Oct 2015; reprinted in Best British Short Stories 2016, ed. Nicholas Royle, UK: Salt Publishing, 2016; reprinted in The Barcelona Review, Issue 88, 2016 [1]; reprinted in The Penguin Book of the Contemporary British Short Story, ed. Philip Hensher, UK: Penguin, October 2018
- "The Woman Who Lived in a Restaurant" as a limited edition chapbook, ed. Nicholas Royle (Nightjar Press, Autumn 2015)
- "The Mullerian Eminence" in Closure: Contemporary Black British Short Stories,, ed. Jacob Ross (UK: Peepal Tree Press, September 2015)
- "Fix" in The World to Come, eds Om Prakash Dwivedi and Patrick West (Australia: Spineless Wonders, November 2014)
- "Smile" in Minuteman, 10 April 2013; collected in Minuteman (USA: Awe&TheAbyss, June 2013)
- "Roll It" in Kingston Noir, ed. Colin Channer (USA: Akashic Books: May 2012)
- "Love Silk Food" in Wasafari magazine, Volume 25, No. 4, eds Bernardine Evaristo and Karen McCarthy (USA, September 2010); reprinted in The Best British Short Stories 2011, ed. Nicholas Royle (UK: Salt Publishing, October 2011)
- "When the River" in Making the Hook Up: Edgy Sex with Soul, ed. Cole Riley (USA: Cleis Press, March 2010)
- "The Heart Has No Bones" in the zine Incommunicado: Uncommon Book_Map, eds Romy Ash and Tom Doig (Australia: Express Media, 2006)
- "Breakfast Time" in Tell Tales, Vol. 2, ed. Rajeev Balasuramanyam (London: flipped eye, June 2005)
- "President Daisy" in The Writer Fellow: An Anthology, eds Terence Brown and Gerald Dawe (Ireland: School of English, Trinity College, 2004)
- "Breathing" in Fish Anthology 2004: Spoonface and Other Stories, ed. Clem Cairns (Ireland: Fish Publishing, June 2004)
- "Contract" in Brown Sugar 3: When Opposites Attract, ed. Carol Taylor (USA: Washington Square Press, January 2004)
- "Art, for Fuck's Sake", in Carol Taylor (ed.), Brown Sugar 2: Great One-Night Stands (USA: Washington Square Press, January 2003)
- "Covenant" in Obsidian III: Literature in the African Diaspora, Vol. 2, No. 2, Fall/Winter 2000–2001, ed. Kwame Dawes (USA: North Carolina State University Press, 2001); in Leone Ross and Yvonne Brissett (eds), Whispers in the Walls: New Black and Asian Voices from Birmingham (UK: Tindal Street, 2001)
- "Drag" in Brown Sugar: A Collection of Erotic Black Fiction, ed. Carol Taylor (USA: Dutton Plume, January 2001)
- "Mudman" in The Time Out Book of London Short Stories, Volume 2, ed. Nicholas Royle (USA & UK: Penguin, October 2000)
- "Tasting Songs" in Dark Matter: A Century of Speculative Fiction from the African Diaspora, ed. Sheree R. Thomas (Hardback; USA: Warner Books, July 2000; trade paperback, Aspect, July 2001); reprinted in The Year's Best Fantasy and Horror: 14th Annual Collection, ed. Ellen Datlow (USA: St. Martin's Press, 2001)
- "And You Know This" in Wild Ways: New Stories About Women on the Road, eds Margo Daley and Jill Dawson (UK: Sceptre Press, March 1998)
- "Façade" in Burning Words, Flaming Images: Poems and Short Stories by Writers of African Descent, ed. Kadija Sesay (UK: SAKS Publications, October 1996); reprinted in England Calling: 24 Stories for the 21st Century, eds Julia Bell and Jackie Gay (UK: Weidenfeld & Nicolson, July 2001)
- "Phone Call to a Rape Crisis Centre" in Burning Words, Flaming Images: Poems and Short Stories by Writers of African Descent, ed. Kadija Sesay (UK: SAKS Publications, October 1996)

=== Non-Fiction ===
- “A Fat Woman’s Love Letter To Water” in the Power Issue of Lighthouse Journal, Issue 18, ed. Anna de Vaul (UK: Gatehouse Press, January 2019)
- "How to Write Weird Shit" in The Art of the Novel, ed. Nicholas Royle (UK: Salt, 2016)
- Foreword to David I. Muir's The Real Rock: Pieces of Jamaica (Jamaica: 2012)
- "The People" in Discover Jamaica (UK: Insight Guides, 2000)
- How Many Storeys? The History of Housing Associations in the UK (as L. J. Ross) (UK: Ujima Housing Association, 2000)
- Afterword to Laurie Gunst's Born Fi' Dead: A Journey Through the Yardie Posse Underworld (UK: Canongate, 1995)
- "Black Narcissus" in IC3: The Penguin Book of New Black Writing in Britain, eds Courttia Newland and Kadija Sesay (UK: Penguin, 2000)

=== Poetry ===
- Poetry ("Rooms", "Ouch", "Sex Myths", "Incidents at 3 A.M.") in Burning Words, Flaming Images, ed. Kadija Sesay (UK: SAKS Media, 1996)
- Poetry in Creation Fire: A CAFRA Anthology of Caribbean Women's Poetry, ed. Ramabai Espinet (Canada: Sister Vision Press, October 1989)

== Awards and nominations ==
- Winner of the 2022 Manchester Prize for Fiction: "When We Went Gallivanting" (short story)

This One Sky Day (2021)

- Longlisted for 2022 Women's Prize for Fiction
- Longlisted for the 2021 RSL Ondjaate Prize for best novel evoking a place
- Shortlisted for the Goldsmith's Prize 2021 for innovative novel writing
- Nominated for: Bad Form magazine's Novel Of the Year 2021
- Nominated for: Rebel Women Lit's Caribbean Book of the Year 2021

Come Let Us Sing Anyway (2017)

- Nominated for: Salt Publishing's Scott Prize
- Nominated for: The 2018 Jhalak Prize
- Shortlisted for the 2018 Edge Hill Prize
- Runner-up, Best Collection in the public-voted Saboteur Awards, 2018

Also:

- Nominated for: The 2015 VS Pritchett Prize: "Love Silk Food" (short story)
- All The Blood Is Red (novel) longlisted for the 1997 Women's Prize [then the Orange Prize]
- London Arts Board Writers Award (2000)
