= Narcopolis =

Narcopolis may refer to:

- Narcopolis, a 2008 four-issue miniseries comic by Jamie Delano and Jeremy Rock.
- Narcopolis (book), a 2012 Indian novel
- Narcopolis (film), a 2015 British film
