= 2012 Man Booker Prize =

Literary award

The 2012 Booker Prize for Fiction was awarded on 16 October 2012. A longlist of twelve titles was announced on 25 July, and these were narrowed down to a shortlist of six titles, announced on 11 September. The jury was chaired by Sir Peter Stothard, editor of the Times Literary Supplement, accompanied by literary critics Dinah Birch and Bharat Tandon, historian and biographer Amanda Foreman, and Dan Stevens, actor of Downton Abbey fame with a background of English Literature studies. The jury was faced with the controversy of the 2011 jury, whose approach had been seen as overly populist. Whether or not as a response to this, the 2012 jury strongly emphasised the value of literary quality and linguistic innovation as criteria for inclusion.

The winner was Hilary Mantel, an early favourite, for her book Bring Up the Bodies, the sequel to her novel Wolf Hall, which won the award in 2009. Mantel became the first woman, and the first Briton, to win the prize twice. A strong challenger to Mantel was established writer Will Self, who was nominated for the first time. Other shortlisters included second-time nominee Tan Twan Eng, Deborah Levy, who returned from a long hiatus of publishing, and novelist débutantes Alison Moore and Jeet Thayil. In the days and weeks leading up to the announcement of the winner, both media commentators and bookmakers considered Mantel and Self favourites to win, with the other four nominees ranked as outsiders.

== Background ==
The 2011 Man Booker Prize attracted a great deal of negative press. The jury's chair, General Director of the MI5 turned spy fiction writer Dame Stella Rimington, was criticised for her statement that what the jury was looking for in the winner was "readability". Likewise, jury member Chris Mullin, a former Labour MP, stated that he liked a novel to "zip along". Critics alleged that literary quality was ignored, and Robert McCrum of The Observer declared the nominations "one of the worst-ever shortlists". Rimington responded to the criticism by claiming that "[p]eople weirder than me have chaired the Booker." Alex Clark, also of The Observer, called the controversy a "straw man debate", contending that the shortlisted writers were "no more – and no less—"readable" than many other writers." Even McCrum had to admit that the winner, Julian Barnes for his The Sense of an Ending, was worthy of the prize.

The 2012 jury took a different approach, in what was called "an implied rebuke" to the previous year's jury. Jury chair Peter Stothard did not explicitly criticise his predecessors, conceding that "[o]bviously there was a row last year, which was probably rather exaggerated like most rows are." Yet he made it clear that literary quality had been at the core of the jury's decisions when choosing the shortlist. "I'm afraid quite a lot of what counts for criticism these days is of that sort: how many stars did it get? Did I have a good time? Would my children like it? It is opinion masquerading as literary criticism." He added that what the jury was looking for was "the pure power of prose – the shock of language". This approach was reflected in the composition of the jury, with a core of literary critics and academics.

== Jury ==
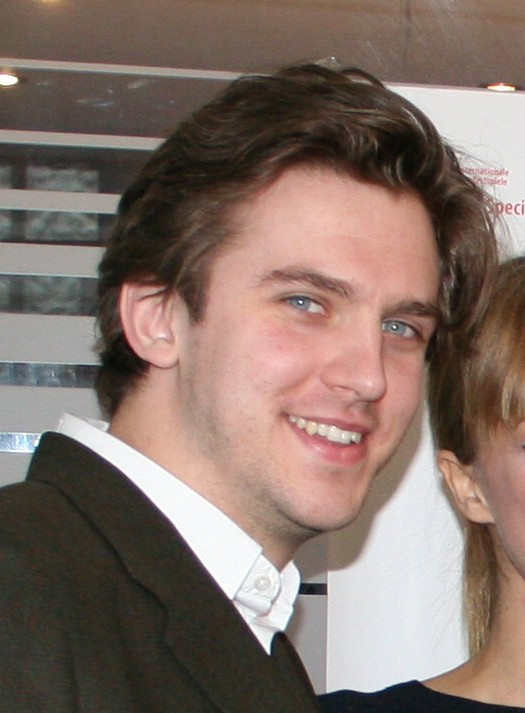
Jury member Dan Stevens had to find ways to read in between takes of Downton Abbey.

The chairman of the jury, Sir Peter Stothard, announced the composition of the jury in December 2011 with the following words:

We have two of Britain's finest professional critics, with expertise in novels from the 18th to the 21st century, a distinguished actor who is also an accomplished literary critic and an historian who is one of the most successful biographers of our time. We are all looking forward to a feisty Man Booker year – with a background of Jane Austen, John Ruskin, Georgiana Duchess of Devonshire, the Times Literary Supplement and even a hint of the library at Downton Abbey.

=== Peter Stothard (chair) ===
Sir Peter Stothard is the Editor of the Times Literary Supplement. Educated at the University of Oxford, he started his career in journalism at the BBC. Here he worked from 1974 to 1977, before moving on to The Times, where he became editor in 1992. In 2002 he went from The Times to a post as editor of the TLS. Stothard is an honorary fellow of Trinity College, Oxford, and president of the Classical Association. He has written two non-fiction books based on his own experiences: Thirty Days: A Month at the Heart of Blair's War (2003), and On the Spartacus Road, a Spectacular Journey Through Ancient Italy (2010).

In preparation for the task as chair of the Booker jury, Stothard read 145 books in seven months, and made sure the other jury members had done the same. His philosophy for the job was to look primarily for linguistic and stylistic innovation in the submitted works, and reward what he described as "the power and depth of prose". He also expressed frustration with the devaluation of expertise in the field of literary criticism. "There is a widespread sense...that traditional, confident criticism, based on argument and telling people whether the book is any good, is in decline. Quite unnecessarily."

=== Dinah Birch ===
Dinah Birch is a literary critic and Professor of English Literature at the University of Liverpool. Educated at Oxford, she specialises in the field of Victorian literature, and has edited two books on the Victorian critic John Ruskin. Birch is serving as the General Editor of the 2012 edition of the Oxford Companion to English Literature.

=== Amanda Foreman ===
Amanda Foreman is a biographer and historian. Educated at Columbia and Oxford, Foreman in 1998 published a biography on Georgiana Cavendish, Duchess of Devonshire, that became an international best-seller, winning the 1998 Whitbread Prize for Biography. More recently, she has written the book A World on Fire (2010), about British-American relations in the American Civil War.

=== Dan Stevens ===
Dan Stevens is an actor and literary critic, best known for his role as Matthew Crawley in the popular drama series Downton Abbey. Stevens studied for a degree in English Literature at the University of Cambridge, where he was also a member of the Footlights theatrical club. In addition to his acting career, Stevens is also editor-at-large of the on-line literary journal The Junket, and has a column in The Sunday Telegraph. He revealed that, in order to have time to read all the required books in the allotted time, he had a special pocket sewn into his Downton costume for an e-reader, that would allow him to read in between takes.

=== Bharat Tandon ===
Bharat Tandon is an academic, writer, and reviewer. Educated at Cambridge, he has specialised on Jane Austen, on whose work he has written one and edited another book: Jane Austen and the Morality of Conversation (2003), and an annotated edition of Emma (2012) respectively. After teaching at both Cambridge and Oxford, Tandon in 2012 became a lecturer at the University of East Anglia. He also reviews novels for the Times Literary Supplement and The Daily Telegraph.

== Longlist ==
The longlist, announced on 25 July, contained one previous recipient of the award: Hilary Mantel. Three-quarters of the longlist came from the United Kingdom. There was also one longlisted writer from each of India, Malaysia and South Africa.

Author	Title	Genre(s)	Country
Barker, Nicola	The Yips	Novel	United Kingdom
Beauman, Ned	The Teleportation Accident	Historical novel	United Kingdom
Brink, André	Philida	Historical novel	South Africa
Tan, Twan Eng	The Garden of Evening Mists	Historical novel	Malaysia
Frayn, Michael	Skios	Novel	United Kingdom
Joyce, Rachel	The Unlikely Pilgrimage of Harold Fry	Novel	United Kingdom
Levy, Deborah	Swimming Home	Novel	United Kingdom
Mantel, Hilary	Bring up the Bodies	Historical novel	United Kingdom
Moore, Alison	The Lighthouse	Novel	United Kingdom
Self, Will	Umbrella	Historical novel	United Kingdom
Thayil, Jeet	Narcopolis	Novel	India
Thompson, Sam	Communion Town	Novel	United Kingdom

== Shortlist ==
The shortlist was announced on 11 September. Jury chairman Peter Stothard praised the selection by stating that "[w]hat made it really worthwhile was finding we had half a dozen extraordinary and exhilarating pieces of prose." He described the jury's path towards the shortlist as an arduous path of reading and rereading. In the end, he said, "[i]t was the power and depth of prose that settled most of the judges' debates and we found the six books most likely to last and to repay future rereading. These are very different books but they all show a huge and visible confidence in the novel's place in the renewing of our words and our ideas."

=== Hilary Mantel – Bring Up the Bodies (winner) ===
Set in 16th century England, dealing with the career of Thomas Cromwell, this is the sequel to 2009 Booker winner Wolf Hall. As the first novel ended, Cromwell had secured the divorce of Henry VIII from Catherine of Aragon, for him to marry Anne Boleyn. Now, the marriage between the King and Anne is in trouble, much due to their failure to produce a male heir. The King's eyes fall on Jane Seymour as a possible replacement for Anne, and it becomes Cromwell's task to navigate a path towards this goal. Cromwell embarks on the task with his usual vigour and competence, but the sacrifices he has to make along the way prove disastrous for Anne, the nation, and ultimately also for himself.

Bring Up the Bodies is part of a trilogy, intended to end with the publication of the final book, whose planned title is The Mirror and the Light. Mantel has talked about her anxiety to get the trilogy right, and about their centrality to her entire literary career. "If I get the third book right then in a sense my whole life will have come right," she said in an interview. "But if I don't, then I am going to see it as a failure. In my mind it is all one long project." About the protagonist, she wrote: "[t]here is no statue to Cromwell, no monument. So I am trying to make one out of paper." The judges did have concerns about nominating Mantel so soon after her last win, but "noted her even greater mastery of method...and the vivid depiction of English character and landscape."

=== Tan Twan Eng – The Garden of Evening Mists ===
A book about memory and survivor guilt, taking place over a period of several decades in the Cameron Highlands of Malaya. Protagonist Yun Ling Teoh, who has recently retired from the Supreme Court, takes a journey to the Cameron Highlands. Oncoming aphasia convinces her of the need to record her memoirs. She first came to the Highlands years earlier, with the intention of recruiting master gardener Nakamura Aritomo to build a garden for her in Kuala Lumpur. This was meant to fulfil a promise she had made to her sister, who died as a fellow prisoner in a Japanese civilian internment camp during the Japanese occupation. Instead she became Aritomo's apprentice, and as their relationship developed, she was forced to face issues concerning her self, her past, and her attitude to the Japanese. She now tells this story to Japanese professor Yoshikawa Tatsuji, who is able to add more pieces to the puzzle that is Nakamura Aritomo.

Tan Twan Eng worked as a lawyer in Kuala Lumpur before devoting himself to writing. The Garden of Evening Mists is his second novel. His début novel, The Gift of Rain (2007), described by one reviewer as "thoughtful, evocative, undoubtedly provocative and, above all, fun", was longlisted for the 2007 Booker Prize. Tan himself writes that, like Aritomo does in his gardening, he tries to apply the principle of shakkei—the art of borrowed scenery—to his writing. "We borrow not only from our own memories," he writes, "but also from the memories of the people around us." The jury called the novel "sternly paced to match its subject", and compared its beauty to "those of slowly clashing icebergs".

=== Deborah Levy – Swimming Home ===
Taking place in a summer house in Southern France, Swimming Home is "a haunting exploration of loss and longing." In the summer of 1994, poet Joe Jacobs vacations in a summer home in the south of France with his war correspondent wife Isabel, his pubescent daughter Nina, and their friends, the unsuccessful shop owning couple Mitchell and Laura. An attractive young woman, Kitty Finch, turns up unexpectedly at the house, and Isabel asks her to stay. The novel describes the subtle and tense relationship between these people, their neighbour, and the house caretaker. Joe Jacobs's death at the end brings together various strands in the novel. A "present day" coda has Jacobs's daughter reflecting on the events.

Deborah Levy, born in South Africa, is the author of a number of plays and novels. Julia Pascal, reviewing Swimming Home for The Independent, compared it to Virginia Woolf's Mrs Dalloway. Among the influences Levy lists for the novel are Greek mythology, the poetry of Pound, Apollinaire, Cummings, H.D., Baudelaire, Plath and the music of Kurt Cobain and Nirvana. She emphasised the central place of Kitty's beauty to the story, and how she has to "field the desiring but often aggressive gaze of every character in the novel". In one interview she described the book as a "page-turner about sorrow". The jury praised the novel's "technical artistry, glowing prose and intimate exposure of loss".

=== Alison Moore – The Lighthouse ===
A middle-aged man deals with childhood memories of abandonment. Futh, a recently separated middle-aged Englishman, takes a ferry to the Continent for a hiking trip through Germany. He brings with him memories of his mother abandoning him while he was still a child, his father's constant philandering, and his wife's infidelities. Meanwhile, Ester, the unhappy wife of a German hotelier, tries to get her husbands attentions by cheating on him. When Futh and Ester's paths meet, the consequences are disastrous.

The Lighthouse is Alison Moore's début novel. She has previously written and published several short stories. For her previous work she has been shortlisted for the Bridport Prize and the Manchester Fiction Prize. In her own words though, "the Man Booker Prize is a different creature altogether." As Swimming Home and The Garden of Evening Mists, The Lighthouse is notable for being published by an independent publishing house: the small Salt Publishing. Moore was interested in the idea of the lighthouse, and the "confusion between a light to guide you home and what the beam from a lighthouse signifies". The jury commended the "bleak inner landscape, written with a temperature control set very low and an acute sense of smell."

=== Will Self – Umbrella ===
An exploration of the modern world, going back to World War I. The novel takes place at three different times during the long 20th century: the time around World War I, the early 1970s, and the present day. Retired psychiatrist Zack Busner looks back at his days as a doctor at a mental hospital in the early 1970s, when he successfully woke up a number of patients with encephalitis lethargica by applying the drug L-DOPA. As a backdrop to the story, we learn of patient Audrey Death's experiences during World War I, and the very diverse careers of her two brothers. As Busner's experiment shows unexpected consequences, it appears the encephalitic patients' condition – with their endless repetition of mechanical movements – is little more than a manifestation of the condition of 20th century man.

Will Self's career has seen the publication of a great number of works of fiction and non-fiction alike, yet Umbrella is the first novel for which he has been shortlisted for a Booker Prize. The novel has been compared to James Joyce's Ulysses because of its stream of consciousness literary style. Self, however, insisted that the formalism was "always of secondary importance" to the characters and the ideas expressed in the novel. He based the story on his own family history, which in many points closely mirrors that of the Deaths. The jury said that they placed the novel on the shortlist "with the conviction that those who stick with it will find it much less difficult than it first seems."

=== Jeet Thayil – Narcopolis ===
A novel about opium and its effect, set in 1970s Old Bombay. The book sets out with the narrator arriving in Bombay, where he gets sucked into the opium underground. Gradually, however, the story expands to encompass all the people he encounters along the way. The reader meets Dimple, the eunuch, Rashid, the opium house's owner, and Mr Lee, a former Chinese officer. All have their own stories to tell. The scene changes as we move towards the present day, and heroin is introduced to the environment.

Narcopolis is Thayil's first novel, though he is previously a published poet. The novel draws on his own experiences as a drug addict, and what he calls "the lost 20 years of my life". it took him five years to write the novel, and he called it "the opposite of catharsis. Catharsis gets stuff out of you. But this put bad feelings into me." Thayil decided to call the book Narcopolis "because Bombay seemed to me a city of intoxication, where the substances on offer were drugs and alcohol, of course, but also god, glamour, power, money and sex". Among the literary works to which Narcopolis has been compared are William S. Burroughs's Junkie and Thomas de Quincey's Confessions of an English Opium-Eater. The jury wrote that they "admired his perfumed prose from the drug dens and backstreets of India's most concentrated conurbation".

== Predictions ==
Most commentators agreed that Mantel and Self had to be considered favourites to win the prize, with the rest at best serving as outsiders. Claire Armitstead of The Guardian wrote that "Mantel and Self lead contenders", at the announcement of the shortlist. Four days before the announcement of the winner, Mike Collett-White described Mantel's novel for Reuters as "the bookmakers' favorite alongside Will Self's 'Umbrella'". At the same time, Emma Lee Potter of the Daily Express conceded that, though the competition was "too tight to call", the "smart money" was "on the best known writers, Will Self and Hilary Mantel". On 15 October, the day before the winner was announced, bookmakers had Self at slightly better odds than Mantel, with the others somewhat behind.

== Winner ==
On 16 October, shortly after 21:40, jury chair Peter Stothard announced that the winner of the 2012 Man Booker Prize was Hilary Mantel for her Bring Up the Bodies. By winning, Mantel became the first woman to win the Booker Prize twice, as well as the first British author to do so (South African J. M. Coetzee and Australian Peter Carey have won the award twice each). Mantel joked that "[y]ou wait 20 years for a Booker Prize; two come along at once". She added: "I know how privileged and lucky I am to be standing here tonight. I regard this as an act of faith and a vote of confidence." Stothard called Mantel the "greatest modern English prose writer", adding that she had rewritten the art of historical fiction. As winner, Mantel also received award money to the sum of £50,000.

== See also ==
- List of winners and nominated authors of the Booker Prize
