= D. W. Wilson =

Canadian author (born 1985)

Dr. D. W. Wilson
- Born: David William Wilson; 1985 (age 40–41); Cranbrook, British Columbia
- Occupations: Professor, author
- Website: www.dwwilson.ca

David William Wilson (born 1985) is a Canadian author. He has published a short story collection and a novel. He won the BBC National Short Story Award in 2011.

== Life ==
Wilson was born in 1985 in Cranbrook, British Columbia.

He studied creative writing at the University of East Anglia (MA 2010; PhD 2013).

== Writing career ==
Wilson won the BBC National Short Story Award in 2011 with his story "The Dead Roads", later included in his debut collection. The story follows three friends on a fraught road trip through Canada.

Wilson's debut short story collection, Once You Break a Knuckle, was published in 2012 by Penguin Books in Canada and Bloomsbury in the UK. It had positive press from Canadian and UK media sources including CBC News, The Globe and Mail, and The Guardian. It was shortlisted for the 2012 Dylan Thomas Prize, awarded to authors under the age of 40.

His debut full-length novel, Ballistics, was published in spring 2013.

Wilson won the Manchester Fiction Prize in 2016 for his story "All This Concrete Beneath Your Feet", which tells of a man and his young son driving down the Alaskan Highway.

== Awards and honors ==
- 2011 BBC National Short Story Award, "The Dead Roads" from Once You Break A Knuckle
- 2012 Dylan Thomas Prize, shortlist, Once You Break a Knuckle
- 2013 Waterstones 11, Ballistics
- 2016 Manchester Fiction Prize, "All This Concrete Beneath Your Feet"

== Works ==
- Once You Break a Knuckle, Bloomsbury, 2012, ISBN 978-1408830284
- Ballistics, Bloomsbury, 2013, ISBN 978-1408833766
