= Come Let Us Sing Anyway =

2017 collection of stories by Leone Ross

- Author: Leone Ross
- Language: English
- Publisher: Peepal Tree Press
- Publication date: 2017
- Publication place: United Kingdom
- Media type: Print
- ISBN: 9781845233341

Come Let Us Sing Anyway, also known as Come Let Us Sing Anyway and other short stories, is a 2017 collection of stories by British author Leone Ross. The volume marks the first time that her short stories have been collected together.

== Stories ==
The twenty-three stories collected predominantly focus on Jamaican women or women of Jamaican ancestry. Stories in the collection include:

- “Drag”
- “Art for ****’s Sake”
- “And You Know This”
- “Breathing”
- “The Woman Who Lived in a Restaurant”
- “The Heart Has No Bones”
- "Love Silk Food"
- "Velvet Man”
- “What He Is”
- “Phone Call to a London Rape Crisis Centre”
- “The Mullerian Eminence”
- “Roll it”
- “Breakfast time”
- “President Daisy”
- “Covenant”
- “Mudman”

== Themes ==
The stories in Come Let Us Sing Anyway feature a variety of themes that include pain, love, and beauty.

== Release ==
Come Let Us Sing Anyway was first published in the United Kingdom in 2017 through Peepal Tree Press. It marks the first time that Ross has published a collection of her short stories.

== Reception ==
Critical reception for Come Let Us Sing Anyway has been positive. The Guardian praised the collection, stating that it "demonstrates her imaginative power and great psychological depth".
