= Dinah Birch =

English literary scholar

Dinah Birch CBE FRSL
- Born: Dinah Lynne Birch; 4 October 1953 (age 73)
- Education: St Hugh's College, University of Oxford
- Occupation: Literary critic

Dinah Lynne Birch CBE FRSL (born 4 October 1953) is an English literary critic. She is a former Pro-Vice-Chancellor for Research and Impact at the University of Liverpool, and is now Emerita Professor of English Literature there. She was a student at St Hugh's College, Oxford, and also undertook her doctorate at the University of Oxford. In 1980, she became the first woman to be elected to the Governing Body of Merton College.

Her work has been primarily on Victorian literature, and among the authors on whom she has published writings are Charles Dickens, Charlotte Brontë, Emily Brontë, and Alfred Tennyson. She has also edited two books on the Victorian critic John Ruskin: Ruskin and Gender (2002) and John Ruskin: Selected Writings (2004). Birch is serving as the General Editor of the 2012 edition of the Oxford Companion to English Literature. She is the author of Our Victorian Education (2008), writes regularly for The Times Literary Supplement and the London Review of Books, and contributes to arts programmes on radio and television.

In December 2011, Birch was named as a member of the jury for the 2012 Man Booker Prize. Jury chair Sir Peter Stothard called her "[one] of Britain's finest professional critics". She is married and has two adult children. Birch lists Middlemarch by George Eliot as her favourite book. She is also a Companion of the Guild of St George.

Birch was appointed Commander of the Order of the British Empire (CBE) in the 2016 Birthday Honours for services to higher education, literary scholarship, and cultural life. She was elected a Fellow of the Royal Society of Literature (FRSL) in 2026.
