= T. J. S. George =

Indian writer and biographer (1928–2025)

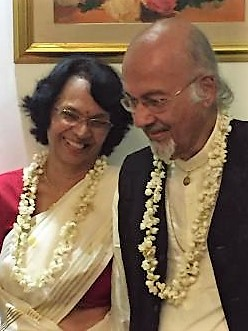
- George and wife Ammu at their 60th wedding anniversary, 2017
- Born: Thayil Jacob Sony George; 7 May 1928
- Died: 3 October 2025 (aged 97)
- Occupations: Journalist, author
- Spouse: Ammu George
- Children: 2, including Jeet Thayil
- Relatives: Raj Mathai (nephew)

Thayil Jacob Sony George (7 May 1928 – 3 October 2025) was an Indian writer and biographer who received a Padma Bhushan award in 2011 in the field of literature and education.

== Background ==
The fourth of eight children, TJS was born in Kerala, India to Thayil Thomas Jacob, a magistrate and Chachiamma Jacob, a homemaker. Although his roots were in Thumpamon, Kerala, he lived in Bangalore and Coimbatore with his wife Ammu. He had a daughter, Sheba Thayil and a son, Jeet Thayil. American television journalist Raj Mathai is his nephew.

George died on 3 October 2025, aged 97. His wife had predeceased him nine months earlier.

== Career and writing style ==
George achieved distinction internationally as a professional author, serious political columnist and biographer with a series of major books. After graduating from Madras Christian College in Chennai (then Madras), India, with an Honours degree in English Literature, he began his career in The Free Press Journal in Mumbai (then Bombay) in 1950. He moved through the International Press Institute, The Searchlight, and the Far Eastern Economic Review to become the founding editor of Asiaweek (Hong Kong).

He was the Editorial Advisor of The New Indian Express. A veteran senior journalist and one of the best known columnists in India, he continued his fight against social injustice, corruption, religious intolerance and in later years right-wing populist tendencies that threatened democracy through his weekly 'Point of View' columns in The New Indian Express which ran for 25 years and ended in June 2022.

Besides being an editor, columnist, author and eternal wordsmith, he was also a longtime China watcher. After a gap of 10 years, he went back to China in 2008 to witness the Olympic preparations and wrote a series of articles about modern China.

== Books ==
- Krishna Menon (London: Jonathan Cape, 1964; OCLC 2882534 / New York: Taplinger, 1965; OCLC 409386) offers a remarkable insight into the baffling personality of the Indian statesman and freedom fighter who inspired a few, infuriated many and embarrassed all.
- Lee Kuan Yew's Singapore (London: André Deutsch, 1973; ISBN 978-0-233-96517-8) is a penetrating analysis of the policies and predilections of this controversial leader.
- The Life and Times of Nargis (New Delhi: Megatechnics, 1994; ISBN 978-81-7223-149-1), an elegant and informative book about the eternal artiste who goes beyond the Hindi film industry, is a throwback to a Golden Age of artistic talent untainted by technology or commercialism.
- The Enquire Dictionary: Ideas, Issues, Innovations (New Delhi: HarperCollins, 1998; ISBN 978-81-7223-377-8) includes Indian and East Asian terms that are conspicuously absent in Western dictionaries.
- The Enquire Dictionary of Quotations (New Delhi: HarperCollins, 2001; ISBN 978-81-7223-417-1) reflects Indian thought, ancient and modern.
- Lessons in Journalism – The Story of Pothan Joseph (New Delhi: Viva Books, 2007; ISBN 978-81-309-0788-8. See also Pothan Joseph's India, New Delhi: Sanchar Pub. House, 1992; ISBN 978-81-7203-008-7) depicts the colourful life of the legendary editor and freedom fighter whose career highlights the importance of professionalism and values in journalism.
- The First Refuge of Scoundrels: Politics in Modern India (Chennai: Express Publications, 2003; ISBN 978-81-86013-05-2) is a collection of articles from TJS George's weekly column, "Point of View", that was a regular feature of The New Indian Express for 10 years.
- Revolt in Mindanao: The Rise of Islam in Philippine Politics (London: Oxford University Press, 1980; ISBN 978-0-19-580460-7)
- Revolt in Bihar: A study of the August 1965 uprising (New Delhi: Perspective Publications, 1965; OCLC 7368391)
- Moments (Patna: Searchlight Press, 1965; OCLC 2870547) is a collection of articles from "Sidelights," the author's editorial column of The Searchlight newspaper, Bihar, India, 1964–65.
- The Provincial Press in India (New Delhi: Press Institute of India, 1966; OCLC 133804) discusses several aspects of the growth of Indian language newspapers.
- Editing: A Handbook for Journalists (New Delhi: Indian Institute of Mass Communications, 1989; OCLC 65172561) foresees the threat of electronic competition and redefines the new role of the print media editor .
- (ed.) India 1000 to 2000: the story of a 1000 years (Chennai: Express Publications, 2000; ISBN 978-81-86013-04-5) A Millennium Book of Reference.
- (ed.) India at 50: Facts, Figures and Analyses 1947 – 1997 (Chennai: Express Publications, 1997; ISBN 978-81-86013-03-8)
- MS – A Life in Music, (New Delhi: HarperCollins, 2004; ISBN 978-81-7223-527-7) "unravels the saga of one of India's most revered musicians", M. S. Subbulakshmi, "who broke through the barriers of class and caste to be accepted by the puritanical upper crust of South Indian society and applauded by the male-dominated bastion of Carnatic music in Madras".
- The Goenka Letters: Behind the scenes in The Indian Express (Chennai: East West Books, 2006; ISBN 978-81-88661-50-3) provides an insight into the hidden and often selfish and petty side of some of the mightiest icons of Indian politics, as well as "vignettes of a period when journalism [in India] underwent a metamorphosis."
- Nātōtikkappalil nālumāsam (Kottayam: DC Books, 2006; ISBN 978-81-264-1383-6. This is a Malayalam translation by Malayatoor Ramakrishnan, illustrations by Bal Thackeray. Original title: Journalist at sea) describes the author's travels to Africa, England and Europe in a merchant ship.
- Ghōshayāthra (Kottayam: DC Books, 2008; ISBN 978-81-264-1956-2), memoirs written in his native language, Malayalam, is an egoless "procession", a journey set off from Bombay to New York through Hong Kong and includes a historical account of modern Indian English journalism.
- Ot̲t̲ayān: āśayaṅṅaḷ, abhipr̲āyaṅṅaḷ, āḷukaḷ (Kottayam: DC Books, 2013), written in Malayalam, is a collection of essays on social conditions of Kerala and India.
- Askew: A Short Biography of Bangalore (Aleph Book Company, 2016; ISBN 978-9384067212) brings alive the history and culture of the erstwhile Garden City turned IT hub, with colourful anecdotes about people, places, and eateries narrated by a longtime resident.
- Jaya: An Incredible Story (Pinnacle Books, 2018; ISBN 978-8193656907) is a compilation of photographs capturing the life and times of former Tamil Nadu Chief Minister Jayalalithaa with interesting captions and annotations.
- The Dismantling of India: In 35 Portraits (Simon & Schuster India, 2022; ISBN 978-9392099168) is an irreverent compilation of essays about politicians, movie stars, criminals, musicians, industrialists and activists that gets the social, cultural and political pulse of India in all its rich complexity.

== Awards ==
- Vakkom Moulavi Memorial Award (2024)
- Kesari Media Award (2017))
- Kamala Surayya Award (2017)
- Azeekodu Award (2013)
- Padma Bhushan (2011)
- Basheer Puraskaram Award (2008)
- Rajyotsava Award (2007)
- Mohammed Koya Journalism Award (2005)
- Patrika Academy Award (2001).
