= Counterpart =

Counterpart or Counterparts may refer to:

== Entertainment and literature ==
- "Counterparts" (short story), by James Joyce
- Counterparts, former name for the Reel Pride LGBT film festival
- Counterparts (film), a 2007 German drama
- Counterpart (TV series), American 2017 sci-fi thriller
- Counterparts (Royle novel), a 1993 novel by Nicholas Royle
- Counterparts (Lira novel), a 1998 novel by Gonzalo Lira

== Music ==
- Counterparts (band), a Canadian metalcore band
- Counterparts (Rush album), 1993
- Counterparts (Revolutionary Ensemble album), 2012

== Other ==
- In paleontology, one half of a split compression fossil
- Counterpart International, a U.S.-based development charity

== See also ==
- Counterpart theory, in metaphysics and philosophy
- Counterparty, in contract law
- Analogue (disambiguation)
