= Bad Idea (magazine) =

British general interest magazine

Bad Idea is a British general interest magazine based in London, England.

== Overview ==
Bad Idea was founded in September 2006 by journalists Jack Roberts and Daniel Stacey, both of whom were students at a magazine production class run by Clay Felker, the founder of New York Magazine, at the University of California.

Bad Idea is known for its feature stories, which are often written in the first person. These have included insider accounts of life as a ‘honeytrapper’ – a private detective sent to ensnare potentially unfaithful husbands; an exposé of Dubai’s sex trade; an investigation into the growth of ‘Web 2.0’ sex dating sites; and a feature following Iraq's Kurds, as they search for DNA evidence of Saddam Hussein's ‘Anfal’ genocide.

In May 2008, Portico Books released Bad Idea – The Anthology, a paperback collection of writing from the magazine's first two years. The magazine was described in a small review of the book published in the Observer as having ‘…hacked itself a niche as a Granta for the MySpace generation’, and the book received 4/5 stars in the Independent on Sunday, where it was said to be '... a great selection of work’.

== Contributors ==
- Jonas Bendiksen (photographer)
- Lowell Bergman (journalist)
- Billy Briggs (journalist)
- Ron Butlin (novelist)
- Sarah M. Broom (writer)
- Neal Fox (artist)
- Niven Govinden (novelist)
- Robert Greene (author)
- Xiaolu Guo (novelist)
- Jean Hannah Edelstein (journalist)
- Edward-Hogan Edward Hogan (novelist)
- Alyssa McDonald (journalist)
- Martyn McLaughlin (journalist)
- Sebastian Meyer (photographer)
- Mil Millington (novelist)
- Patrick Neate (novelist)
- Nicholas Royle (novelist)
- Sorious Samura (journalist)
- Joe Stretch (novelist/musician)
- Simon Wheatley (photographer)
