= Raj Mathai =

American journalist

- Born: March 28; Trivandrum, Kerala, India
- Education: San Diego State University
- Occupation: American television journalist
- Employer: Channel 11, NBC Bay Area
- Relatives: T. J. S. George (uncle); Thomas Kailath (uncle); Jeet Thayil (cousin); Abraham Verghese (cousin)

Raj Mathai is an American television journalist. He is the primary news anchor at NBC-owned KNTV in the San Francisco Bay Area.

== Career ==
Mathai anchors the 6pm, 7pm and 11pm newscasts for NBC Bay Area KNTV and hosts the series The Interview. The series sets Mathai with newsmakers such as former Vice President Kamala Harris, California Governor Gavin Newsom, and General Colin Powell. In 2013, Mathai conducted exclusive interviews with John McAfee about his life and his legal troubles.

Mathai field anchors KNTV's breaking news and big event coverage including the 2024 Super Bowl, 2017 Inauguration of Donald Trump, 2017 Las Vegas massacre and the 2016 San Bernardino shootings. He led KNTV's coverage of the 2013 Asiana Airlines crash at San Francisco International Airport. He was on the air for seven consecutive hours and was the first journalist to interview a survivor of the crash. Mathai is also a moderator for the Commonwealth Club of California and a guest lecturer for the Stanford School of Business. Mathai is a 3-time Olympic torch bearer and has reported on-location from the Olympics in Tokyo, London, Vancouver, Turin, Athens and Salt Lake City.

Prior to his news career, Mathai was a sportscaster for NBC Bay Area (1998–2010). In 1995 he became the first Indian sportscaster for a network affiliate in the United States when he began at KYMA-DT. He worked for NBC affiliates KNSD in San Diego, KYMA-DT in Yuma, AZ, and KSEE in Fresno, CA. He was an Olympic torch bearer in 1996, 2002, and 2008. Mathai co-hosted Sports Sunday along with Jerry Rice, Nnamdi Asomugha, Jeff Garcia and Ken Norton Jr. He was part of the NBC broadcast team for the San Francisco Giants from 2008–2012 along with Jon Miller and Mike Krukow.

== Awards ==
Mathai is a 12-time Emmy Award winner, including regional Emmys for Best On-Camera Talent, Breaking News, Outstanding Documentary and Outstanding Cultural Program for his coverage of the 2012 London Olympics. Mathai was also honored by the California State Legislature in 2024 for his contributions to the AAPI Community.

== Personal life ==
Mathai was born in Trivandrum, Kerala, India. He lived in Mumbai until age 7, when he moved Palo Alto, California. He comes from a family of journalists and writers, including his father TJ Mathew who ran magazines in India in the 1970s, and his uncle T. J. S. George, who founded Asiaweek.

Mathai is the cousin of best-selling authors Abraham Verghese and Jeet Thayil. He is also the nephew of Thomas Kailath, noted Stanford Professor.

Mathai attended Los Altos High School and San Diego State University where he graduated with a degree in journalism and political science in 1993. Prior to his career as a broadcaster, Mathai was a public relations assistant with the San Diego Chargers. He was also part of the Super Bowl staff for the National Football League in 1993 and 1994.

Mathai is on the Board of Governors for the San Francisco Symphony and Board Member for the Asian Pacific Fund.
