= Alison Moore (writer) =

English writer

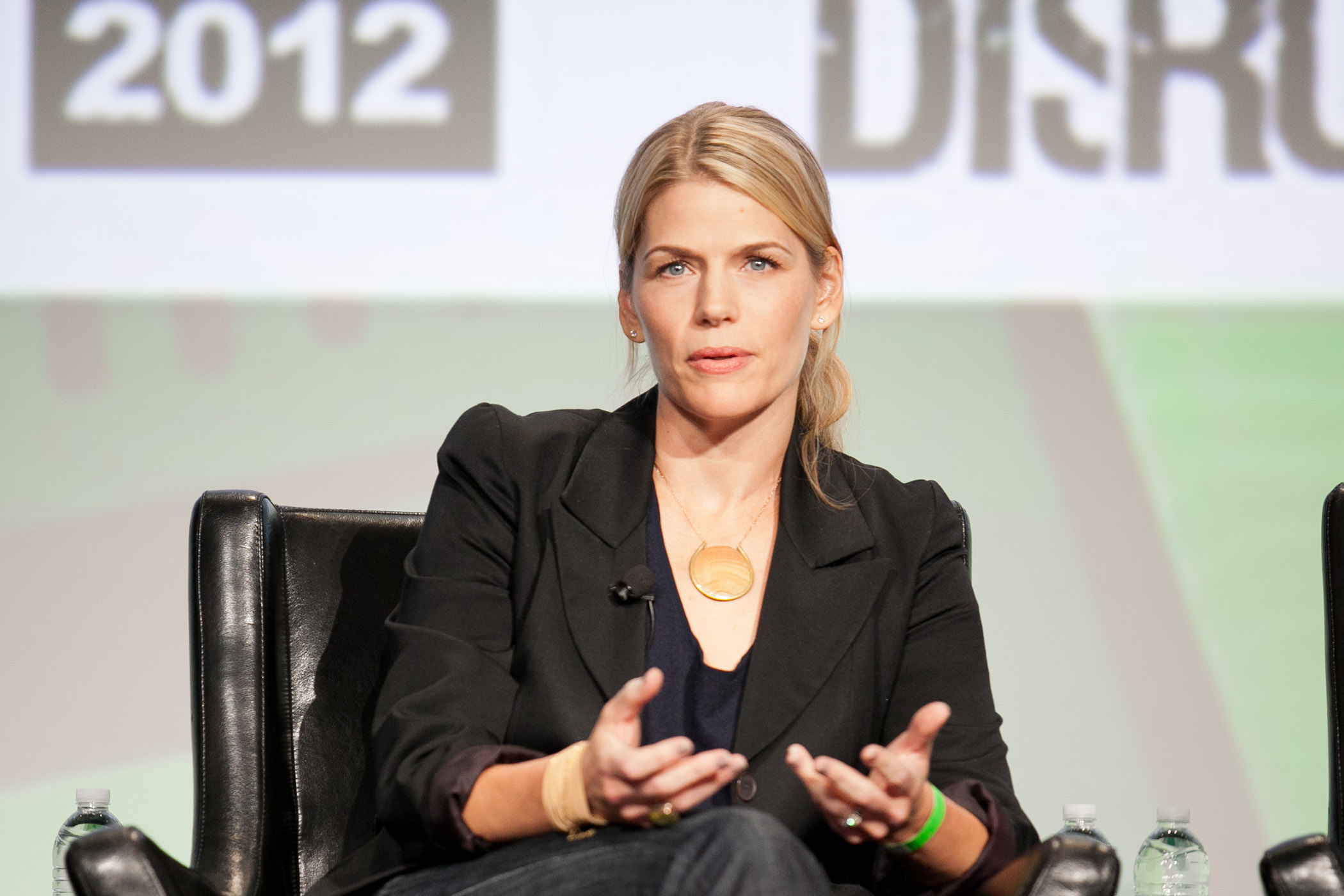
- Born: 1971 (age 54–55); Manchester
- Occupation: Author

Alison Moore (born 1971) is an English writer. Born in Manchester, she lives in Leicestershire. She is an honorary lecturer in the School of English at the University of Nottingham.

== Work ==
Moore's 2012 debut novel, The Lighthouse, was shortlisted for the 2012 Man Booker Prize. In reaction to the announcement, Moore commented: "Reaching the shortlist is ridiculously exciting. I keep feeling like I ought to stop daydreaming and get on with something, but it's all real." Chair of the Booker jury, Sir Peter Stothard, described the jury's decision in the following words: "The judges admired The Lighthouse's bleak inner landscape, a temperature control set low and an impressively assured control." The Lighthouse went on to win the 2013 McKitterick Prize.

Before The Lighthouse, Moore had written and published several short stories, including 'Static', shortlisted for the inaugural Manchester Fiction Prize, and 'When the Door Closed, It Was Dark', published as a chapbook by Nightjar Press and included in Best British Short Stories 2011. Much of this work is collected in The Pre-War House and Other Stories, whose title story won first prize in the novella category of the New Writer Prose and Poetry Prizes 2009.

Her second novel, He Wants, was published in 2014. Both The Lighthouse and He Wants were Observer Books of the Year. Her third novel, Death and the Seaside was published in 2016. In 2018, Moore published her fourth novel, Missing, and a chapter book for children, Sunny and the Ghosts, which became the first in a trilogy, illustrated by Ross Collins. A fifth novel The Retreat was published in 2021, followed in 2022 by a second collection, Eastmouth and Other Stories.

== Reviews ==
=== The Lighthouse ===
"A haunting and accomplished novel." (Katy Guest, The Independent on Sunday)

=== He Wants ===
"The best novels are the ones that leave you with a sense of yearning, and in He Wants, Alison Moore proves her mastery of the medium." (Lynsey May, The List)

=== Death and the Seaside ===
"Moore masterfully dials up the tension throughout, leading to an unexpected finale that feels both inevitable and deliciously satisfying." (Colette Maitland, The New Quarterly)

=== Missing ===
"There are books which, when you finish reading them, force you to stop everything for a moment to acknowledge their excellence, to mark a personal encounter with something special. Missing is one of those books" (Nina Allan, The Spider's House)

=== Sunny and the Ghosts ===
"There is humour and kindness alongside the mischief and mystery. A delightful and satisfying read for any age." (Jackie Law, Never Imitate)

=== The Retreat ===
"The Retreat is a small masterpiece of disconnection." (Kate McLoughlin, The Times Literary Supplement)
