= Opium lamp =

Oil lamp designed for opium usage

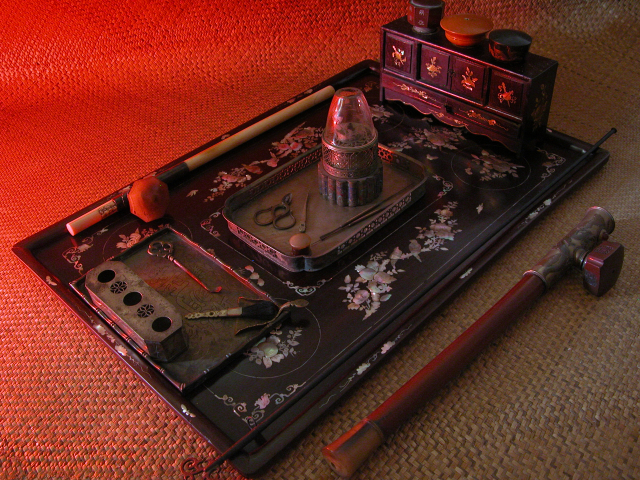
Opium vaporization paraphernalia: An opium pipe, an opium lamp, spare pipe-bowls, and other implements lie arranged on a layout tray; a second opium pipe rests nearby.

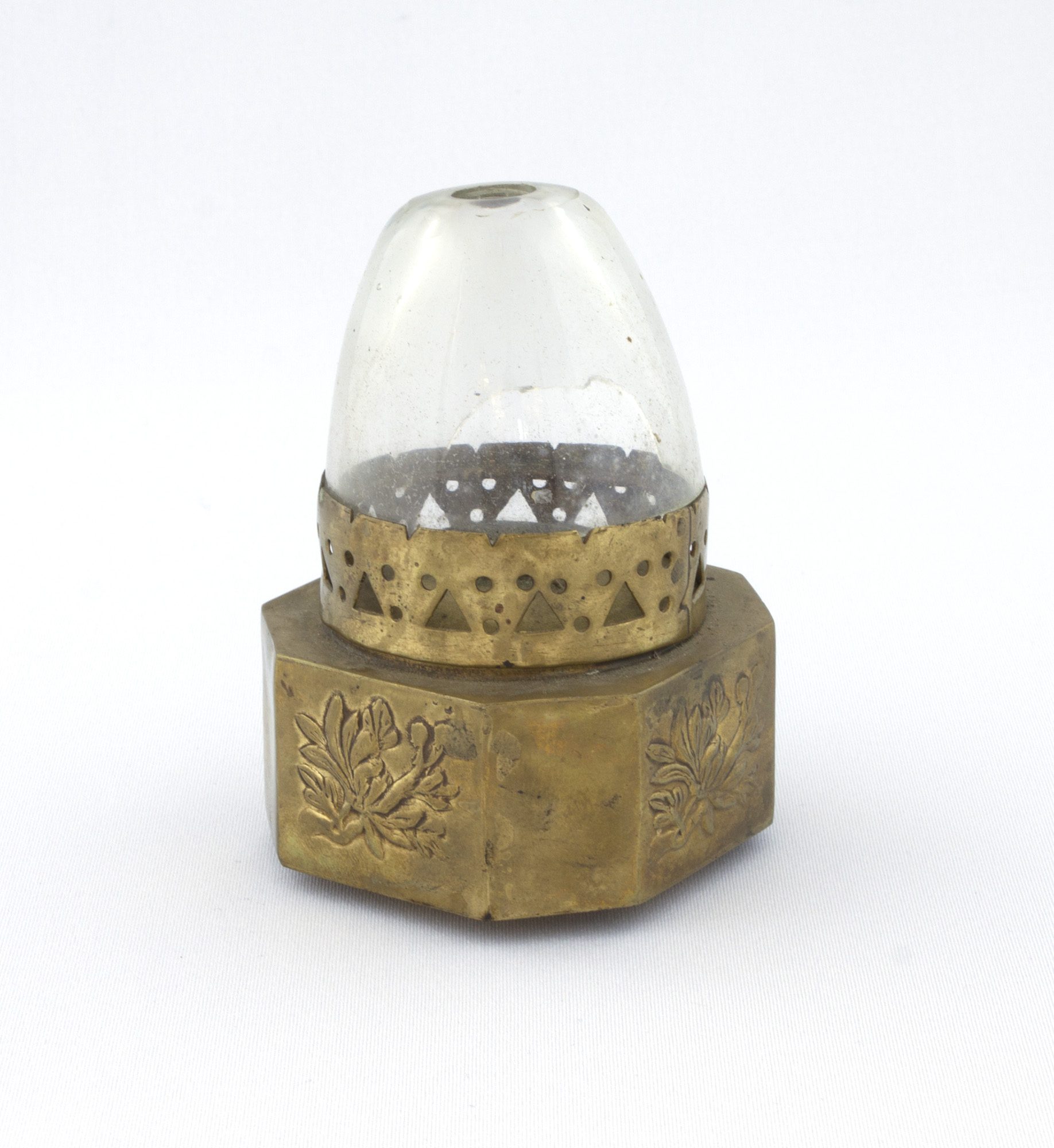
Mass-produced reproduction opium lamp made for the souvenir trade circa 1950, UBC collection.

An opium lamp is an oil lamp designed specifically to facilitate the vaporization and inhalation of opium. Opium lamps differ from conventional lamps for lighting in that they are designed to channel an exact amount of heat upward through their funnel-shaped chimneys. An opium pipe, its pipe-bowl primed with a small dose of opium known as a "pill," was held over the opium lamp causing the opium to vaporize and allowing the smoker to inhale the vapors.

Opium lamps were crafted mainly in China before the Chinese Communist Revolution in 1949 brought opium smoking to an abrupt halt there. Small-scale production of opium lamps continued in Hong Kong and parts of Southeast Asia including Vietnam until the mid-1960s.

Opium lamps were usually crafted from one or more types of metal such as silver, brass or paktong, an alloy also known as nickel silver. Often the metal parts of the lamp were adorned with cloisonné. The opium lamp's distinctive chimney was made from glass. Inexpensive lamps made entirely of molded glass were mass-produced and pieces of them are commonly found at historic Chinese settlements, such as the sites of former Chinese camps in the California goldfields. Examples of opium lamps crafted from Peking glass are sought after by collectors.

Due to opium eradication campaigns in the nineteenth and early twentieth centuries, antique opium lamps are now rare.
