= The Oxford Companion to English Literature =

Reference work on English Literature (Oxford University Press)

Fifth "Drabble" edition Cover art: Gwen John, A Lady Reading, 1909–11

The Oxford Companion to English Literature, first published in 1932, edited by the retired diplomat Sir Paul Harvey (1869–1948), was the earliest of the Oxford Companions to appear. It is currently in its seventh edition (2009), edited by Dinah Birch. The work, which has been periodically updated, includes biographies of prominent historical and leading contemporary writers in the English language, entries on major works, "allusions which may be encountered", significant (serial) publications and literary clubs. Writers in other languages are included when they have affected the Anglophone world. The Companion achieved "classic status" with the expanded fifth edition edited by novelist and scholar Margaret Drabble, and the book was often referred to as "The Drabble".

Harvey's entries concerning Sir Walter Scott, much admired by Drabble in the introduction to the fifth edition, were reduced in the sixth edition, for reasons of space.

Modern technology has meant that the two most recent editions have been updated at intervals of about five years before more radical changes are made; a revised printing of the sixth edition was published in 2006. The revised 2000 edition is now available in the Oxford Reference Online series by subscription only.

== Editions ==
- 1932: first edition, edited by Paul Harvey
- 1937: second edition, edited by Harvey
- 1948: third edition, edited by Harvey
- 1967: fourth edition, revised by Dorothy S. Eagle
- 1985: fifth edition, edited by Margaret Drabble
- 2000: sixth edition, edited by Drabble
- 2009: seventh edition, edited by Dinah Birch
