= Counterparts (Royle novel) =

1993 novel by Nicholas Royle

- Author: Nicholas Royle
- Language: English
- Publication date: 1993

Counterparts is a 1993 novel written by Nicholas Royle.

== Plot summary ==
Counterparts is a novel in which two protagonists are tormented—Gargan, a tightrope walker who self-mutilates in his sleep, and Adam Midwinter, an actor grappling with a fractured sense of identity. Their lives unfold in a haze where the boundaries between waking reality and dream-state horror blur deeply. Through haunting imagery—blood-slicked baths, surreal bodily trauma, and disorienting sensory moments—the novel crafts an atmosphere of existential dread. Despite its disturbing content, the narrative compels empathy as Gargan and Midwinter seek meaning and healing amidst their internal chaos.

== Reception ==
Gideon Kibblewhite reviewed Counterparts for Arcane magazine, rating it an 8 out of 10 overall, and stated that "It's a strange, brave and well-written psychological mystery, but don't give it to your mother for Christmas."

== Reviews ==
- Review by Paul J. McAuley (1994) in Interzone, March 1994
- Review by Neil Williamson (1994) in Territories: The Slipstream Journal, Summer 1994
