= Manchester Fiction Prize =

The Manchester Fiction Prize is an award for an unpublished short story run by the Manchester Writing School at Manchester Metropolitan University. It was established in 2009. With a prize of £10,000, it is one of the richest prizes for a single short story currently running in the UK, second only to the BBC National Short Story Award. Previous winners include Toby Litt, Martin MacInnes, D. W. Wilson, and Leone Ross.

== History ==
The prize was launched by Carol Ann Duffy and the Manchester Writing School at Manchester Metropolitan University (MMU) in 2009. It was the second phase of the annual Manchester Writing Competition, which began in 2008 with the first Manchester Poetry Prize.

The Prize is open internationally to published or unpublished writers aged 16 or over. Submitted stories must be unpublished, either in print or online. In 2009, the maximum story length was 5,000 words. This was reduced to 3,000 for the 2011 competition.

The Prize awards a cash prize of £10,000 to a single short story. In 2012, this was split into a first prize of £7,500 and a second prize of £2,500. The 2009 Prize also offered a bursary for study at MMU to an entrant aged 18–25, as part of the Jeffrey Wainwright Manchester Young Writer of the Year Award. This bursary was discontinued after the first year.

Initially running every two years, the competition ran annually between 2013 and 2021. The most recent competition was held in 2023.

== Award ==
The 2009 competition was judged by Sarah Hall, M. John Harrison, and Nicholas Royle. The prize-winners were announced at a ceremony held at Manchester Town Hall on 23 October 2009. The ceremony opened the 2009 Manchester Literature Festival 'Short Weekend' and was hosted by James Draper from the Manchester Writing School and Matthew Frost from the Manchester Literature Festival. Toby Litt took the £10,000 first prize. The runners up were Peter Deadman, Vicki Jarrett, Jennifer Mills, and Alison Moore. Michael E. Halmshaw was named the Manchester Young Writer of the Year.

The 2011 Prize was judged by Heather Beck, John Burnside, and Alison MacLeod, with Nicholas Royle as head judge. The judges were so impressed with the overall quality that they increased the shortlist from six to eight, and commended an additional 31 stories. The shortlist included four writers from the UK, three from the USA, and one from Canada. The panel decided to split the prize, the only time this has happened in the history of the competition. They awarded a first prize of £7,500 to Krishan Coupland and a second prize of £2,500 to Richard Hirst. The runners up were Nicole Cullen, Garret Freymann-Weyr, Silvia Moreno-Garcia, Alex Preston, Bethany Rogers, and Judith Turner-Yamamoto.

The next Prize was awarded in 2013, to Adam Wilmington. The competition then ran annually until 2021, with winners including Martin MacInnes (2014), D.W. Wilson (2016), and Leone Ross (2021).

No competition was held in 2022 or 2024. The 2023 Prize was awarded to April Yee.

== Winners ==
- 2009 Toby Litt
- 2011 Krishan Coupland (first prize) Richard Hirst (second prize)
- 2013 Adam Wilmington
- 2014 Martin MacInnes
- 2015 Sean Lusk
- 2016 D. W. Wilson
- 2017 Sakinah Hofler
- 2018 Gabriel Monteros
- 2019 Tim Etchells
- 2020 Ian Dudley
- 2021 Leone Ross
- 2023 April Yee
