= The Lighthouse (Moore novel) =

2012 novel by Alison Moore

- Author: Alison Moore
- Language: English
- Publisher: Salt Publishing
- Publication date: 15 August 2012
- Publication place: United Kingdom
- Pages: 192 pages
- ISBN: 1907773177

The Lighthouse is a novel by English writer Alison Moore, published on 15 August 2012. The novel deals with a middle-aged man's memories of childhood abandonment as he embarks on a walking trip through Germany. The book was shortlisted for the 2012 Man Booker Prize on 11 September 2012.

== Synopsis ==
Futh, a recently separated middle-aged Englishman, takes a ferry to the Continent for a hiking trip through Germany. He brings with him memories of his mother abandoning him while he was still a child, his father's constant philandering, and his wife's infidelities. Meanwhile, Ester, the unhappy wife of a German hotelier, tries to get her husband’s attentions by cheating on him. When Futh and Ester's paths meet, the consequences are disastrous.

== Reception ==
Jenn Ashworth of The Guardian called the novel "a chilly, heart-wrenching story". Boyd Tonkin, reviewing the book for The Independent, described it as "[d]isquieting, deceptive, crafted with a sly and measured expertise".
