= Jeet Thayil =

Indian writer (born 1959)

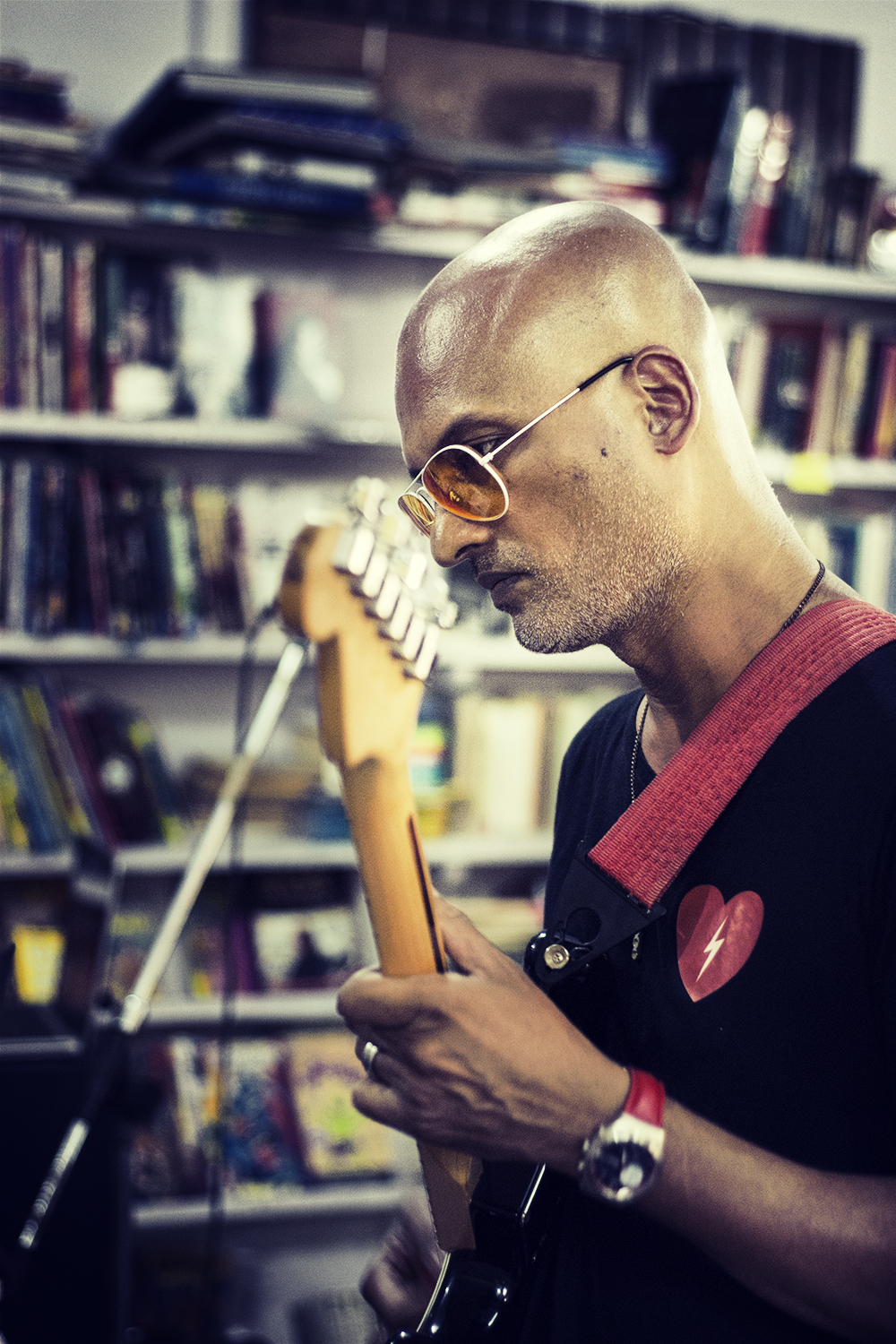
- Jeet Thayil at Goobe's Book Republic, Bangalore.
- Born: 1959 (age 66–67); Mamalassery, Kerala, India
- Education: Sarah Lawrence College (MFA)
- Occupations: Author, Journalist, Poet, Musician, Guitarist
- Relatives: T. J. S. George (father); Raj Mathai (cousin); Abraham Verghese (cousin)
- Writing career
- Language: English
- Notable works: These Errors Are Correct (2008) Narcopolis (2012); Collected Poems (2015) Names of the Women (2021)
- Notable awards: Sahitya Akademi Award; DSC Prize for South Asian Literature
- Website: www.jeetthayil.com

Jeet Thayil (born 1959) is an Indian poet, novelist, librettist and musician. He is the author of several poetry collections, including These Errors Are Correct (2008), which won the Sahitya Akademi Award. His first novel, Narcopolis, (2012), won the DSC Prize for South Asian Literature, and was shortlisted for the 2012 Man Booker Prize and The Hindu Literary Prize.

== Biography ==
Thayil was born in Kerala, India. His father is writer and editor Thayil Jacob Sony George, and the family moved with his work. Thayil was raised in Mumbai until age 8, then moved to Hong Kong, and returned to Mumbai at age 18 where he graduated from Wilson College. He later completed an MFA at Sarah Lawrence College in New York. Until age 40, Thayil lived in Mumbai and Bengaluru, and worked as a journalist in Mumbai, Bengaluru, Hong Kong, and New York.

In 2006, he told The Hindu that he had been an alcoholic and an addict for almost two decades. He began using drugs after he returned to India at age 18. In 2013, he told Gulf News that he successfully quit at age 42.

As a songwriter and guitarist, he is one half of the contemporary music project Sridhar/Thayil (Mumbai, New Delhi).

== Writing career ==
His first novel, Narcopolis (2012), is set mostly in Bombay in the 1970s and '80s, and sets out to tell the city's secret history, when opium gave way to new cheap heroin. Thayil has said he wrote the novel: "to create a kind of memorial, to inscribe certain names in stone. As one of the characters [in Narcopolis] says, it is only by repeating the names of the dead that we honour them. I wanted to honour the people I knew in the opium dens, the marginalised, the addicted and deranged, people who are routinely called the lowest of the low; and I wanted to make some record of a world that no longer exists, except within the pages of a book."

His other novels include The Book of Chocolate Saints (2017), Low (2020), and Names of the Women (2021). Thayil spent five years writing an 800-page draft of Narcopolis, and then split the draft into the 300-page Narcopolis and his later novels The Book of Chocolate Saints and Low. The three novels form what Thayil sees as "Bombay Trilogy".

His poetry collections include Gemini (1992), Apocalypso (1997), English (2004), These Errors Are Correct (2008), and Collected Poems (2015). In 2016, he was the Arts Queensland Poet-In-Residence.

Thayil is the editor of the Bloodaxe Book of Contemporary Indian Poets (Bloodaxe, UK, 2008), 60 Indian Poets (Penguin India, 2008) and a collection of essays, Divided Time: India and the End of Diaspora (Routledge, 2006). His poetry is included in Anthology of Contemporary Indian Poetry (United States, 2015).

He is the author of the libretto for the opera Babur in London, commissioned by the UK-based Opera Group with music by the Zürich-based British composer Edward Rushton. The world premiere of Babur took place in Switzerland in 2012, followed by tours to the United Kingdom (performed at theatres in London and Oxford) and India. At the work's core is an exploration about the complexities of faith and multiculturalism in modern-day Britain. Its action hinges on an imagined encounter between a group of religious fundamentalists and the ghost of Babur, who challenges their plans for a suicide strike.

== Awards and honours ==
In 2012, Thayil's poetry collection These Errors are Correct was awarded the Sahitya Akademi Award for English. He was shortlisted for the Man Booker Prize 2012 and The Hindu Literary Prize (2013) for his debut novel Narcopolis. In 2013, Thayil became the first Indian author to win the DSC Prize for South Asian Literature, worth $50,000, for the novel Narcopolis.

== Style ==
The Indian poet Dom Moraes, in his introduction to Thayil's first book of poems (with poet Vijay Nambisan), Gemini, said that Thayil did not trouble his mind with the concerns of many Indian poets, their Indianness, that he did not make statements that were irrelevant to his work, that his concerns were mainly personal. Thayil, Moraes said, "works his feelings out with care, through colourations of mood rather than through explicit statements."

About Narcopolis, Thayil said, "I've always been suspicious of the novel that paints India in soft focus, a place of loved children and loving elders, of monsoons and mangoes and spices. To equal Bombay as a subject you would have to go much further than the merely nostalgic will allow. The grotesque may be a more accurate means of carrying out such an enterprise."

Thayil, writes a reviewer for Indian Book Critics, is good when he writes without personal exertions (review for Collected Poems).

== Bibliography ==
=== Poetry ===
- Collected Poems, Aleph Book Company, New Delhi, 2015. ISBN 978-9384067434
- These Errors Are Correct, Tranquebar Books (EastWest and Westland), Delhi, 2008. ISBN 978-8189975425
- English, Penguin Books, New Delhi and Rattapallax Press, New York, 2004. ISBN 1-892494-59-0
- Apocalypso, Aark Arts, London, 1997, ISBN 1-899179-01-1
- Gemini, Penguin-Viking, New Delhi, 1992. (two-poet volume ), ISBN 0-670-84524-8

=== Fiction ===
- Narcopolis, Faber and Faber, London, 2012, ISBN 978-0-571-27576-2
- The Book of Chocolate Saints, Aleph, 2017, ISBN 978-9386021038
- Low, Faber and Faber, 2020, ISBN 978-0571360727
- Names of the Women, Jonathan Cape, 2021, ISBN 978-1787332928
- The Elsewhereans: A Documentary Novel, 23 June 2025, ISBN 978-9369897797

=== As an editor ===
- The Bloodaxe Book of Contemporary Indian Poets, Bloodaxe UK, 2008 ISBN 1-85224-801-7
- 60 Indian Poets, Penguin India, 2008 ISBN 978-0143064428
- Divided Time: India and the End of Diaspora, Routledge, 2006
- Give the Sea Change and It Shall Change: 56 Indian Poets, Fulcrum, 2005
- Vox2: Seven Stories, Sterling Newspapers, India, 1997
