= Niven Govinden =

English novelist

Niven Govinden (born 1973) is an English novelist. He was born in East Sussex and then educated at Goldsmiths College, University of London, where he studied film. To date he has written five novels and a number of short stories. His writing has appeared in the magazine Bad Idea, and his short story My Cinephiliac Shame appeared in the 2008 Bad Idea Anthology. He was appointed the Chair of Judges for the 2015 Green Carnation Prize.

== Novels ==
We Are The New Romantics (2004)

Graffiti My Soul (2007)

Black Bread White Beer (2013)

All the Days and Nights (2014)

This Brutal House (2019)

Diary of a Film (2021)
