= Narcopolis (novel) =

2012 novel by Jeet Thayil

- Author: Jeet Thayil
- Language: English
- Publisher: Penguin Books
- Publication date: 26 September 2012
- Pages: 304 pages
- ISBN: 0143123033

Narcopolis is the debut novel of Indian author Jeet Thayil, which was shortlisted for the 2012 Man Booker Prize. It is set in 1970s Old Bombay and concerns opium and its influence. The novel's narrator arrives in Bombay, where he becomes seduced into the opium underground. The story expands to encompass such characters as Dimple, a hijra, Rashid, the opium house's owner, and Mr Lee, a former Chinese officer, all of whom have stories to tell.

== Autobiography element ==
The novel draws on his own experiences as a drug addict, and what he calls "the lost 20 years of my life". it took him five years to write the novel, and he called it "the opposite of catharsis. Catharsis gets stuff out of you. But this put bad feelings into me." Thayil decided to call the book Narcopolis "because Bombay seemed to me a city of intoxication, where the substances on offer were drugs and alcohol, of course, but also god, glamour, power, money and sex".

== Reception ==
According to The Guardian, "Narcopolis is a blistering debut that can indeed stand proudly on the shelf next to Burroughs and De Quincey."
