= Opium pipe =

Pipe used to evaporate and inhale opium

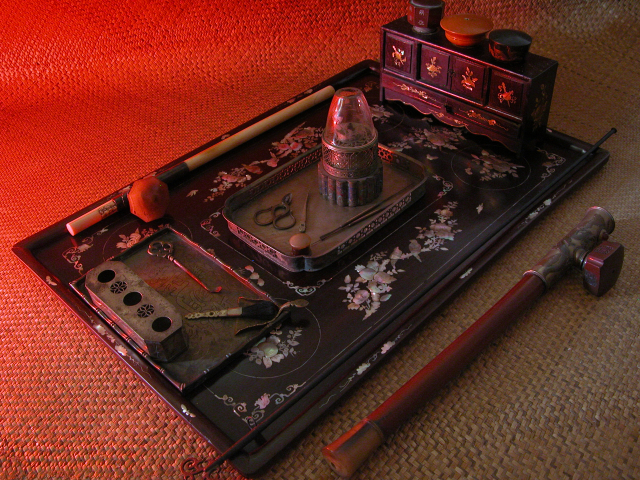
Opium vaporization paraphernalia: An opium pipe, an opium lamp, spare pipe-bowls, and other implements lie arranged on a layout tray; a second opium pipe rests nearby.

An opium pipe is a pipe designed for the evaporation and inhalation of opium. True opium pipes allow for the opiate to be vaporized while being heated over a special oil lamp known as an opium lamp. It is thought that this manner of "smoking" opium began in the seventeenth century when a special pipe was developed that vaporized opium instead of burning it.

== Design and materials ==
The configuration of the typical opium pipe consists of a long stem, a ceramic pipe-bowl, and a metal fitting, known as the "saddle", through which the pipe-bowl plugs into the pipe-stem. The pipe-bowl must be detachable from the stem due to the necessity to remove the bowl and scrape its insides clean of opium ash after several pipes have been smoked. The stems of opium pipes were usually made from bamboo, but other materials such as ivory and silver were used. Pipe-bowls were typically a type of ceramic, such as blue and white porcelain. Sometimes opium pipe-bowls were carved from more valuable materials such as jade.

Because of its design, the opium pipe needed an opium lamp in order to function. The lamp was as highly specialized as the pipe, and was designed to channel the required amount of heat upon the pipe-bowl so that the opium would vaporise and allow the smoker to inhale the vapors.

== Rarity ==
Due to opium eradication campaigns in the nineteenth and early twentieth centuries, antique opium pipes from then are now extremely rare.

== Pipe dream ==
In the early 20th century, opium pipes were often called dream sticks. Something that is a "pipe dream" is a metaphorical reference to an unattainable or fanciful hope or scheme.
