= List of BBC National Short Story Award winners =

Winners and shortlists for UK literary prize

BBC National Short Story Award
- Awarded for: Best short story by a UK national or resident
- Sponsored by: BBC Radio 4 with Cambridge University
- Country: United Kingdom
- Presented by: BBC (formerly National Endowment for Science, Technology and the Arts)
- Formerly called: National Short Story Award (2006–2007)
- First award: 2006
- Currently held by: "You Cannot Thread a Moving Needle", Colwill Brown (2025)
- Website: BBC National Short Story Award

Television/radio coverage
- Network: BBC Radio 4

The BBC National Short Story Award (known as the National Short Story Award in 2006 and 2007) is an annual short story contest in the United Kingdom which is open to UK residents and nationals. It has been described as "one of the most prestigious [awards] for a single short story" and the richest prize in the world for a single short story. The award aims to increase interest in the short story genre, particularly British short stories. As of 2017, the winner receives £15,000 and four shortlisted writers receive £600 each.

It was founded in 2005 and announced at the Edinburgh International Book Festival the same year. The National Endowment for Science, Technology and the Arts (NESTA) were the main sponsor with support from BBC Radio 4 and Prospect magazine. Originally, winners received £15,000 while runners up received £3,000 and shortlisted writers £500 each. In 2008, the BBC became the main sponsor and the award was renamed from the 'National Short Story Award' to the 'BBC National Short Story Award'.

In 2009, only women were featured on the shortlist. This happened for the second time in 2013 and the fifth time in 2018. In 2018, prize judge Di Speirs noted that the BBC National Short Story Award has never had an all-male shortlist. Short stories written by women typically account for between 50 and 70% of all submissions.

At 26 years old, Canadian writer D. W. Wilson became the youngest ever recipient of the award in 2011. In 2020, Sarah Hall, who won the award in 2013 and 2020, became the first writer to have won the award twice. In 2012, in honour of the 2012 Summer Olympics hosted in London, the competition was open to a global audience for one year only. Ten stories were shortlisted, instead of five, and Bulgarian writer Miroslav Penkov won.

== Winners and shortlisted writers ==
=== 2000s ===
BBC National Short Story Award winners and finalists, 2006–2009
Year	Author	Title	Result	Ref.
2006	James Lasdun	An Anxious Man	Winner	
2006	Michel Faber	The Safehouse	Runner up	
2006	Rose Tremain	The Ebony Hand	Shortlist	
2006	William Trevor	Men of Ireland	Shortlist	
2006	Rana Dasgupta	The Flyover	Shortlist	
2007	Julian Gough	The Orphan and the Mob	Winner	
2007	David Almond	Slog's Dad	Runner up	
2007	Jonathan Falla	The Morena	Shortlist	
2007	Jackie Kay	How to Get Away with Suicide	Shortlist	
2007	Hanif Kureishi	Weddings and Beheadings	Shortlist	
2008	Clare Wigfall	The Numbers	Winner	
2008	Jane Gardam	The People on Priviledge Hill	Runner up	
2008	Adam Thorpe	The Names	Shortlist	
2008	Erin Soros	Surge	Shortlist	
2008	Richard Beard	Guidelines for Measures to Cope with Disgraceful and Other Events	Shortlist	
2009	Kate Clanchy	The Not-Dead and the Saved	Winner	
2009	Sara Maitland	Moss Witch	Runner up	
2009	Jane Rogers	Hitting Trees with Sticks	Shortlist	
2009	Lionel Shriver	Exchange Rates	Shortlist	
2009	Naomi Alderman	Other People's Gods	Shortlist	

=== 2010s ===
BBC National Short Story Award winners and finalists, 2010–2019
Year	Author	Title	Result	Ref.
2010	David Constantine	Tea at the Midland	Winner	
2010	Jon McGregor	If It Keeps on Raining	Runner up	
2010	Helen Oyeyemi	My Daughter the Racist	Shortlist	
2010	Sarah Hall	Butcher's Perfume	Shortlist	
2010	Aminatta Forna	Haywards Heath	Shortlist	
2011	D.W. Wilson (Note: D. W. Wilson became the youngest ever recipient of the award in 2011.)	The Dead Roads	Winner	
2011	Jon McGregor	Wires	Runner up	
2011	K.J. Orr	The Human Circadian Pacemaker	Shortlist	
2011	M. J. Hyland	Rag Love	Shortlist	
2011	Alison MacLeod	The Heart of Denis Noble	Shortlist	
2012	Miroslav Penkov	East of the West	Winner	
2012	Henrietta Rose-Innes	Sanctuary	Runner up	
2012	Julian Gough	The iHole	Shortlist	
2012	Carrie Tiffany	Before He Left the Family	Shortlist	
2012	Chris Womersley	In the Basement	Shortlist	
2012	Adam Ross	A Lovely and Terrible Thing	Shortlist	
2012	Deborah Levy	Black Vodka	Shortlist	
2012	M. J. Hyland	Even Pretty Eyes Commit Crimes	Shortlist	
2012	Lucy Caldwell	The Goose Father	Shortlist	
2012	Krys Lee	Escape Routes	Shortlist	
2013	Sarah Hall	Mrs Fox	Winner	
2013	Lucy Wood	Notes from the House Spirits	Runner up	
2013	Lavinia Greenlaw	We Are Watching Something Terrible Happening	Shortlist	
2013	Lionel Shriver	Prepositions	Shortlist	
2013	Lisa Blower	Barmouth	Shortlist	
2014	Lionel Shriver	Kilifi Creek	Winner	
2014	Zadie Smith	Miss Adele Amidst the Corsets	Runner up	
2014	Francesca Rhydderch	The Taxidermist's Daughter	Shortlist	
2014	Rose Tremain	The American Lover	Shortlist	
2014	Tessa Hadley	Bad Dreams	Shortlist	
2015	Jonathan Buckley	Briar Road	Winner	
2015	Mark Haddon	Bunny	Runner up	
2015	Hilary Mantel	The Assassination of Margaret Thatcher	Shortlist	
2015	Jeremy Page	Do It Now, Jump the Table	Shortlist	
2015	Frances Leviston	Broderie Anglaise	Shortlist	
2016	K.J. Orr	Disappearances	Winner	
2016	Claire-Louise Bennett	Morning, Noon & Night	Runner up	
2016	Lavinia Greenlaw	The Darkest Place in England	Shortlist	
2016	Tahmima Anam	Garments	Shortlist	
2016	Hilary Mantel	In a Right State	Shortlist	
2017	Cynan Jones	The Edge of the Shoal	Winner	
2017	Jenni Fagan	The Waken	Shortlist	
2017	Will Eaves	Murmur	Shortlist	
2017	Helen Oyeyemi	If a Book Is Locked There's Probably a Good Reason for That, Don't You Think?	Shortlist	
2017	Benjamin Markovits	The Collector	Shortlist	
2018	Ingrid Persaud	The Sweet Sop	Winner	
2018	Nell Stevens	The Minutes	Shortlist	
2018	Kiare Ladner	Van Rensburg's Card	Shortlist	
2018	Sarah Hall	Sudden Traveller	Shortlist	
2018	Kerry Andrew	To Belong To	Shortlist	
2019	Jo Lloyd	The Invisible	Winner	
2019	Lynda Clark	Ghillie's Mum	Shortlist	
2019	Tamsin Grey	My Beautiful Millennial	Shortlist	
2019	Lucy Caldwell	The Children	Shortlist	
2019	Jacqueline Crooks	Silver Fish in the Midnight Sea	Shortlist	

=== 2020s ===
BBC National Short Story Award winners and finalists, 2020–
Year	Author	Title	Result	Ref.
2020	Sarah Hall (Note: Sarah Hall is the only writer to have won the award twice.)	The Grotesques	Winner	
2020	Eley Williams	Scrimshaw	Shortlist	
2020	Jack Houston	Come Down Heavy	Shortlist	
2020	Jan Carson	In the Car With the Rain Coming Down	Shortlist	
2020	Caleb Azumah Nelson	Pray	Shortlist	
2021	Lucy Caldwell	All the People Were Mean and Bad	Winner	
2021	Danny Rhodes	Toadstone	Shortlist	
2021	Rory Gleeson	The Body Audit	Shortlist	
2021	Georgina Harding	Night Train	Shortlist	
2021	Richard Smyth	Maykopsky District, Adyghe Oblast	Shortlist	
2022	Saba Sams	Blue 4eva	Winner	
2022	Kerry Andrew	And the Moon Descends on the Temple That Was	Shortlist	
2022	Jenn Ashworth	Flat 19	Shortlist	
2022	Vanessa Onwuemezi	Green Afternoon	Shortlist	
2022	Anna Bailey	Long Way to Come for a Sip of Water	Shortlist	
2023	Naomi Wood	Comorbidities	Winner	
2023	Cherise Saywell	Guests	Shortlist	
2023	K Patrick	It's Me	Shortlist	
2023	Nick Mulgrew	The Storm	Shortlist	
2023	Kamila Shamsie	Churail	Shortlist	
2024	Ross Raisin	Ghost Kitchen	Winner	
2024	Will Boast	The Barber of Erice	Shortlist	
2024	Lucy Caldwell	Hamlet, a love story	Shortlist	
2024	Manish Chauhan	Pieces	Shortlist	
2024	Vee Walker	Nice Dog	Shortlist	
2025	Colwill Brown	You Cannot Thread a Moving Needle	Winner	
2025	Emily Abdeni-Holman	Yair	Shortlist	
2025	Edward Hogan	Little Green Man	Shortlist	
2025	Caoilinn Hughes	Two Hands	Shortlist	
2025	Andrew Miller	Rain, a History	Shortlist	
2026	Cherise Saywell	Ditto	Winner	
2026	Laura Beatty	Two Minutes to Midnight	Shortlist	
2026	Lucy Caldwell	Little Lands	Shortlist	
2026	Merryn Glover	Burning Bush	Shortlist	
2026	Caoilinn Hughes	A Second Opinion	Shortlist	

== See also ==
- List of British literary awards
- List of years in literature
