= Julian Gough =

English-born Irish musician and writer (born 1966)

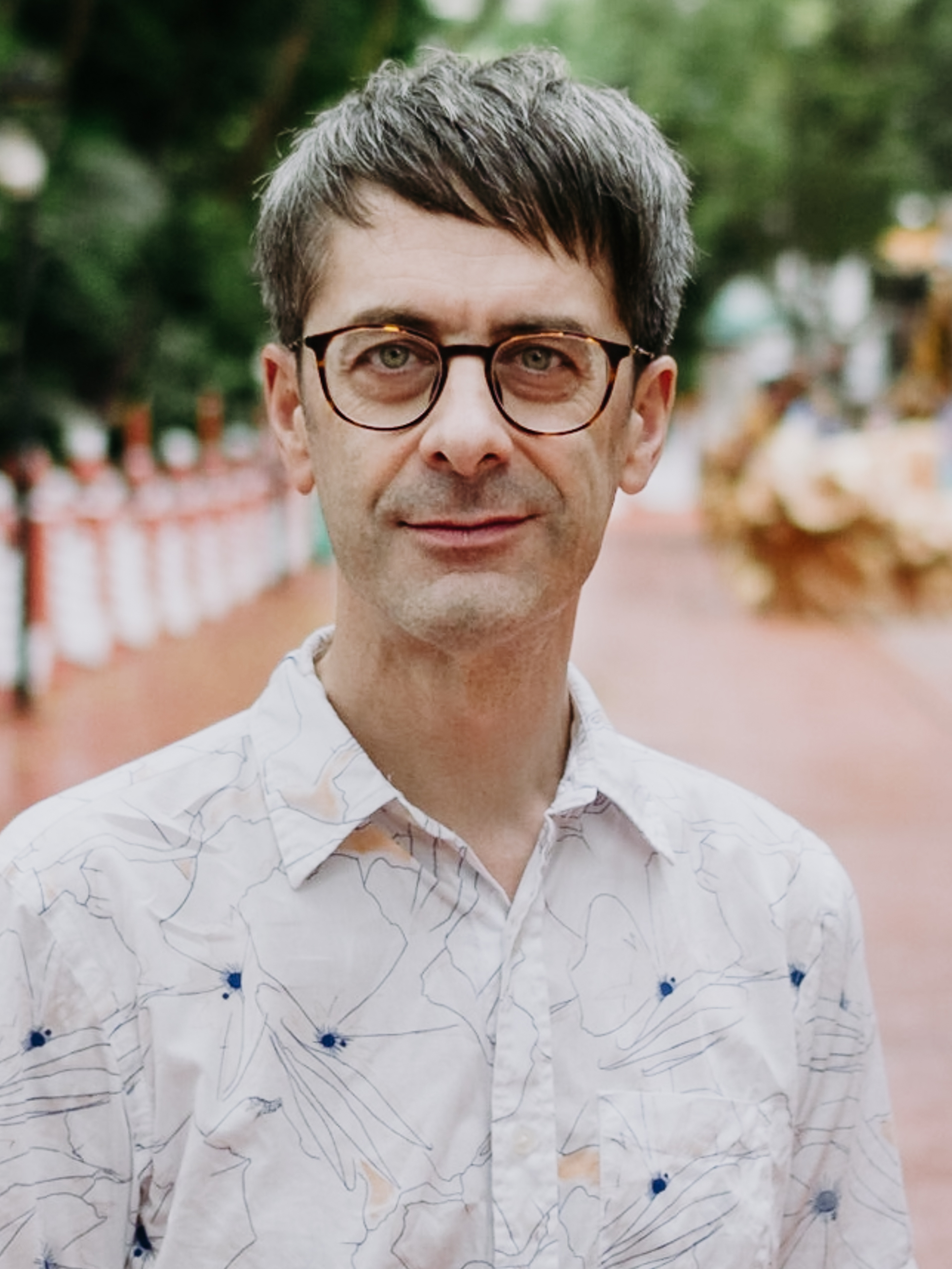
- Gough in 2017
- Born: June 1966 (age 60)
- Education: University College Galway
- Website: juliangough.com

Julian Gough (born June 1966) is an Irish musician, novelist, and poet. Initially known as the singer and lyricist for the Galway band Toasted Heretic, he has since established a career as a satirist, novelist, commentator and writer of children's books.

Musically, he is best known for his songs "Galway and Los Angeles", "You can Always go Home" and "LSD (isn't what it used to be)".

Notable fictional works include the End Poem that appears at the end of the videogame Minecraft, as well as "The Orphan and the Mob", the first chapter of his novel Jude: Level 1, which won the BBC National Short Story Award in 2007.

Since 2022, Gough has been writing a blog, The Egg and the Rock, about his research extending Lee Smolin's theory of cosmological natural selection, which he believes has been neglected for sociological rather than scientific reasons.

== Early life and education ==
Gough grew up near Heathrow Airport in London, before moving to Nenagh, Co. Tipperary aged seven.

== Career ==
=== Music ===
He was studying English and philosophy at University College Galway in the late 1980s when he and some friends founded Toasted Heretic. The band recorded four albums and had one top-10 hit, "Galway and Los Angeles", in 1992.

In 1996, Gough co-wrote Peig: The Musical!, a humorous adaptation of the autobiography of Peig Sayers which ran at the Town Hall Theatre, Galway for four sold-out performances. Gough described it as "an act of the most exquisite revenge...and of great therapeutic value to a generation traumatised by her infernal book as children".

=== Writing ===
Gough's first novel, Juno & Juliet, was published in 2001 by Flamingo, almost a decade after Toasted Heretic split up. His second novel, Jude: Level 1, was published in 2007 at Old Street Publishing, shortly after he won the 2007 National Short Story Award for the book's first chapter, titled "The Orphan and the Mob".

In 2010, Salmon Poetry released Gough's first poetry collection, Free Sex Chocolate, which juxtaposes Gough's more recent forays into poetry with his earlier lyrics written for Toasted Heretic. He is also the author of several short stories and novellas that satirize global economic policies, including Great Hargeisa Goat Bubble (2003) and CRASH! How I Lost a Hundred Billion and Found True Love (2013). In 2015, Gough signed a book deal with Picador.

In November 2011, Gough was invited by Markus Persson, creator of Minecraft, to create a story for the ending of the game, in preparation for its release. The resulting work, called the End Poem, has been described as both confusing to and revered by the Minecraft community. After a psilocybin trip prompted Gough to consider the poem's line "The universe said I love you because you are love" and how he had received but not accepted love for his poem, he wrote an essay in his newsletter in December 2022 explaining that he had never signed a contract with either of Minecraft's parent companies, and that he was releasing the original version of the poem into the public domain.

Gough writes columns and opinion pieces for various newspapers and magazines, including The Guardian, Prospect Magazine and A Public Space. His novel Jude in London came third in the 2011 Guardian Not The Booker prize after the author threatened to share pictures of him "wearing only the [Not The Booker trophy] mug" should he win the competition.

In 2012, his short story "The iHole" was shortlisted for the BBC International Short Story Award. The story was broadcast on BBC Radio 4 in September 2012, read by Irish actor Andrew Scott.

In 2016, Gough, in collaboration with illustrator Jim Field, published Rabbit's Bad Habits, the first installment of the Rabbit and Bear series of children's books. By 2024, the series has grown to six books and has been translated into over thirty languages.

=== Cosmological research ===
In 2022, he announced The Egg and the Rock, an upcoming book in which Gough aims to explore the nature of the universe as an evolving organism subject to natural selection. Parts of the book are being written and published in public.

In July 2022 he made predictions about what the James Webb Space Telescope (JWST) would see and would not see, predicting that the point of recombination would be optimised for supermassive black hole formation. These predictions were subsequently borne out by the data from the JWST.

In March 2025 he published a blog post on his cosmological theory which he named the Blowtorch Theory. It posits the idea that "sustained, powerful jets from supermassive black holes in the extremely early universe actively carved the large-scale structure of the universe we see all around us today, including galaxies, cosmic voids, and filament." The theory received broadly positive responses from scientists. German physicist and cosmologist Jenny Wagner said it raised "highly important questions on the validity of our current concordance model in cosmology".

In September 2025, Gough's theory of natural selection on the scale of universes was critiqued in discussion with American scientists Christopher Field and Michael Levin.

Gough has been credited with reviving interest in the theory of cosmological natural selection and has received funding from Emergent Ventures and O'Shaughnessy Ventures to further his research.

== Publications ==
- Juno & Juliet (Flamingo, 2001) ISBN 978-0-00-710810-7
- Jude: Level 1 (Old Street, 2007) ISBN 978-1-905847-24-2
- Free Sex Chocolate (Salmon Poetry, 2010) ISBN 978-1-907056-36-9
- Jude in London (Old Street, 2011) ISBN 978-1-905847-83-9
- "End Poem" from Minecraft (2011).
- The Great Goat Bubble: A Fairy Tale of Financial Folly (Old Street Publishing, 2012) ISBN 978-1908699077
- CRASH! How I Lost a Hundred Billion and Found True Love (DailyLit, 2013) ISBN 9781938972034
- Rabbit's Bad Habits (Hodder Children's Books, 2016) ISBN 978-1444921687
- Rabbit and Bear: The Pest in the Nest (Hodder Children's Books, 2017) ISBN 978-1444921717
- Connect (Doubleday, 2018) ISBN 978-0-385541-33-6
- Rabbit and Bear: Attack of the Snack (Hodder Children's Books, 2018 ISBN 9781444921724
- Rabbit and Bear: A Bite in the Night (Hodder Children's Books, 2019) ISBN 1667203851
- Rabbit and Bear: A Bad King is a Sad Thing (Hodder Children's Books, 2022) ISBN 9781444937473
- Rabbit and Bear: This Lake is Fake (Hodder Children's Books, 2024) ISBN 978-1444947571
