= Martha'r Mynydd =

Welsh rumourmonger

Martha'r Mynydd (English: 'Mountain Martha'), fl. c. 1770, was a woman who lived in a cottage near Llanllyfni, Wales. She is known for having convinced many neighbours of the existence of 'The Invisibles', a large group of wealthy people who attended markets and fairs without being seen. She claimed a 'Mr. Ingram' lived nearby in an invisible mountain mansion, with his daughter 'Miss Ingram', who was occasionally seen dressed completely in white. 'Mr. Ingram' would come to night time assemblies at Martha's cottage to preach.

'Mr. Ingram' was most likely Martha's father, while Martha played 'Miss Ingram'; a sceptic, knowing Martha to have burnt her foot, once stepped on 'Miss Ingram' 's foot at a gathering and recognised the subsequent cry to be Martha's voice. However, this sceptic was chased from the countryside by her followers. Nonetheless, this sparked doubt as to the truth of Martha's tales so that Martha abandoned the trick. She instead committed herself to the Methodist cause at Llanllyfni.

== In contemporary culture ==
In 2019, Jo Lloyd's story "The Invisible", based on Martha's life, won the BBC National Short Story Award.

== Sources ==
- Robert Jones (Rhoslan), Drych yr Amseroedd, 97 (in O. M. Edwards' ed.);
- W. R. Ambrose, Hynafiaethau, cofiannau, a hanes presennol Nant Nantlle y traethawd buddugol yn Eisteddfod Gadeiriol Pen-y-groes, Llun y Pasg, 1871, 1872, 60.
- "Llyfrgell Genedlaethol Cymru :: Y Bywgraffiadur Cymreig". Yba.llgc.org.uk.
