= Christopher van Wyk =

South African writer (1957–2014)

Chris van Wyk
- Born: Christopher van Wyk; 19 July 1957; Johannesburg, Transvaal, Union of South Africa
- Died: 3 October 2014 (aged 57); Johannesburg, South Africa
- Education: Riverlea High School
- Occupation: Author
- Years active: 35
- Notable work: Shirley, Goodness and Mercy, "In Detention" (poem)
- Spouse: Kathy van Wyk
- Children: 2

Christopher van Wyk (19 July 1957 – 3 October 2014) was a South African children’s book author, novelist and poet. Van Wyk is famous for his poem "In Detention" on the suspicious deaths that befell South African political prisoners during Apartheid. He was also an editor at Ravan Press.

== Life and work ==
Van Wyk was born in Baragwanath Hospital in Soweto. When he was a little older, his family moved to Riverlea, a suburb outside of Johannesburg. He was educated at Riverlea High School in Riverlea, Johannesburg, where he lived until 2005. His autobiographical novel Shirley, Goodness & Mercy details his childhood growing up in Riverlea. The follow-up novel, Eggs to Lay, Chickens to Hatch, continues this theme. Van Wyk worked as a clerk for the independent South African Committee for Higher Education (SACHED) as an educational writer of accessible literature for new readers. He was also editor of Staffrider from 1981 to 1986 and in 1980 started the short-lived Wietie magazine with Fhazel Johennesse. One of Van Wyk’s most notable achievements was his abridgement of Nelson Mandela’s Long Walk to Freedom for children.

Van Wyk died in Johannesburg on 3 October 2014, aged 57.

== Writing ==
During the literary explosion among black writers that followed the Soweto uprising in 1976 van Wyk published a volume of poetry, It Is Time to Go Home (1979), that won the 1980 Olive Schreiner Prize. The book is characterized by the preoccupations of other Soweto poets such as Mongane Serote, Sipho Sepamla, and Mafika Gwala and employs the language of defiance and assertion in poetry that reveals at all times the Black Consciousness of the era. In 1981 he received the Maskew Miller Longman Literature Award for black children's literature for A Message in the Wind (1982), the story of two boys who travel in their homemade time machine to their shared tribal past of 1679. Other children's stories include Peppy 'n Them (1991) and Petroleum and the Orphaned Ostrich (1988). He has written books for neo-literate adults, such as The Murder of Mrs. Mohapi (1995), My Cousin Thabo (1995), Take a Chance (1995), My Name is Selina Mabiletsa (1996), and Sergeant Dlamini Falls in Love (1996), biographies of Sol Plaatje and Oliver Tambo for teenagers, and adaptations of works by Bessie Head, Sol Plaatje and Can Themba. He won the 1996 Sanlam Literary Award for his short story "Relatives", published in Crossing Over (1995). The Year of the Tapeworm (1996) is an adult novel and warns of government control of the media. His latest work Eggs to Lay, Chickens to Hatch details childhood memories about growing up in Riverlea and his colourful interactions with the men and women who lived the African proverb that "it takes a village to raise a child".

== Van Wyk: The Storyteller of Riverlea ==
From 25 January to 24 February 2019, a one-man play entitled, Van Wyk: The Storyletter of Riverlea, was performed by Zane Meas at the Market Theatre in Johannesburg. The play was written by Meas and directed by Christo Davids. The actors previously shared the stage in 2007 as "old" and "young" Chris, respectively, in a production van Wyk's memoir, Shirley Goodness and Mercy, adapted by Janice Honeyman, and performed at the Baxter Theatre in Cape Town and at the Market Theatre.

== Honorary Doctorate of Literature ==
At a graduation ceremony on 27 March 2019, van Wyk was posthumously awarded the degree of Doctor of Literature (DLitt) (honoris causa) by the University of the Witwatersrand.

== Publications ==
- Memory(....)
- Maria (1966)
- It is Time To Go Home (1979)
- A Message in the Wind (1982)
- Petroleum and the Orphaned Ostrich (1988)
- Oliver Tambo (1994)
- My Cousin Thabo (1995)
- April in the Cape of Storms (1996)
- The Year of the Tapeworm (1996)
- Helen Joseph (2003)
- Now Listen Here: The Life and Time of Bill Jardine (2003)
- Shirley, Goodness and Mercy (2005)
- "In Detention", poem published in Knowledge4Africa.com (2007)
- We Write what we like: Celebrating Steve (2007)
- The Long Walk to Freedom (Children's abridged version) (2009)
- Nelson Mandela (2010)
- Eggs to Lay, Chickens to Hatch: A Memoir (2010)
- Ouma Ruby's Secret (2014)
