= Mulgrew =

Mulgrew is a name of Irish origin, which is an anglicization of the Gaelic name O'Maolchraoibhe. Mulgrew is used as a surname or given name, and may refer to:

== List of people with the given name ==
- Mulgrew Miller (1955–2013), American jazz pianist

== List of people with the surname ==
- Charlie Mulgrew (born 1986), Scottish football player
- Jamie Mulgrew (born 1986), Northern Irish football player
- Kate Mulgrew (born 1955), American actress
- Kevin Mulgrew (born 1947), New Zealand football player
- Michael Mulgrew (born 1965), American labor leader
- Nick Mulgrew (born 1990), South African writer
- Peter Mulgrew (1927–1979), New Zealand mountaineer
- Tommy Mulgrew (1929–2016), Scottish football player

=== Fictional characters ===
- Christine Mulgrew, from the BBC TV Drama Waterloo Road
