= The Diary of Maria Tholo =

- First edition
- Author: Maria Tholo
- Language: English
- Genre: Diary
- Publisher: Ravan Press
- Publication date: 1979
- Publication place: South Africa
- ISBN: 978-0869751787

The Diary of Maria Tholo was a series of interviews with a South African resident of Soweto, Maria Tholo, which were published by Ravan Press as Tholo's 'diary' in 1979.

Maria Tholo was interviewed each week by a researcher, Carol Hermer, over a year starting in February 1976. Hermer chose to present the material "in diary format [...] to lend immediacy to the events."

The interviews spanned a period of time which included the Soweto uprising, in which police infamously fired on schoolchildren. Maria Tholo provided eyewitness testimony of the township rioting and its after-effects, juxtaposed with quotidian detail of her own immediate family life. This gave her account of the uprising "the ambivalence and complexity that history and hindsight sometimes erase".
