= K Patrick =

Scottish novelist, story writer, and poet

- Occupations: Novelist, poet, short story writer
- Writing career
- Notable work: Mrs S (2023)

K Patrick is a Scottish poet, novelist and short story writer. Patrick has been shortlisted for the White Review Prize for both poetry and short fiction, and for the BBC National Short Story Award. Their debut novel was published in 2023 and their debut poetry collection in 2024.

== Life and education ==
Patrick took a master's degree in creative writing at Glasgow University and lives in Scotland.

== Career ==
Patrick's work has appeared in journals such as The Poetry Review, Granta, and The White Review. In 2021, Patrick was nominated for the White Review Prize in both the poetry and short story category. In 2023, their story "It's Me" was shortlisted for the 2023 BBC National Short Story Award.

Patrick's debut novel, Mrs S, was published in 2023. The Guardian described it as "inventive and original" but noted that stylistic choices gave it "serious problems of pace". Kristen Arnett reviewed the book for The New York Times, saying she could "wax on about the sensuality of Patrick's narrative".

Patrick was named one of Granta's Best of Young British Novelists 2023, for novelists under the age of 40. In the same year, they were also selected as one of The Guardian's ten best debut novelists, a list that is not age-restricted.

In 2024, Patrick published a collection of poetry, Three Births, described by The Guardian as an "artful, sensual debut". It was shortlisted for the Scotland's National Book Awards Scottish Poetry Book of the Year.

== Bibliography ==
=== Novel ===
- —— (2023). Mrs S (hardcover 1st ed.). London: Fourth Estate. ISBN 9780008560997.

=== Poetry ===
- —— (2024). Three Births (paperback 1st ed.). London: Granta Poetry. ISBN 9781915051097.
