= Lucy Wood (writer) =

British short story writer

- Occupation: Short story writer; novelist
- Notable works: Diving Belles
- Notable awards: BBC National Short Story Award Runner up (2013)

Lucy Wood is a British short story writer and novelist. She has published two short story collections and one novel, all set in Cornwall. She won a Betty Trask Prize in 2016 and was the runner up for the BBC National Short Story Award in 2013.

== Early and personal life ==
Wood grew up in Cornwall. She got a Master's degree in Creative Writing from Exeter University.

== Writing career ==
Wood's debut short story collection, Diving Belles, was published in 2012. Set in modern Cornwall, its twelve "magic-realist" stories are "wrapped in local mythology". The collection was shortlisted for the 2013 Edge Hill Short Story Prize. A story originally published in this collection, 'Notes From the House Spirits', was the runner up for the BBC National Short Story Award in 2013.

Wood's debut novel, Weathering, was published in 2015. The Guardian said that the novel was set apart by its "extraordinary treatment of the rural setting ... both uncanny and pitilessly realist". The New York Times called it "captivating" and described Wood's writing style as "precise, unindulgent, fresh and honest". The novel won a Betty Trask Prize in 2016.

The Sing of the Shore, Wood's second short story collection, was published in 2018. The thirteen stories are again set in Cornwall, but now in "a world we recognise", where "current concerns facing the region are given more weight". However, The Guardian noted "a kind of eerie tension" that transforms the stories into "heart-thumping miniature thrillers". The collection was shortlisted for the 2019 Edge Hill Short Story Prize. A story from the collection, 'Flotsam, Jetsam, Lagan, Derelict', was selected for The Penguin Book of the Contemporary British Short Story.

Wood has also received a Somerset Maugham Award and the Holyer an Gof Award and been longlisted for the Dublin Literary Award, the Dylan Thomas Prize, and the Frank O'Connor Award.

== Bibliography ==
- Wood, Lucy (2012). Diving Belles.
- Wood, Lucy (2015). Weathering.
- Wood, Lucy (2018). The Sing of the Shore.
