= The Electric Michelangelo =

2004 novel by Sarah Hall

The Electric Michelangelo is a fictional 2004 biographic novel by Sarah Hall. The main character, Cy Parks, is a tattoo artist and the book follows his life and dreams. It was longlisted for the Orange Prize for Fiction and shortlisted for the Man Booker Prize in 2004.
