= Toasted Heretic =

Irish rock band

- Origin: Galway, Ireland
- Genres: Alternative rock, alternative pop, punk rock
- Years active: 1985–present
- Labels: Bananafish Records; Liquid Records
- Members: Declan Collins; Neil Farrell; Julian Gough; Aengus McMahon; Barry Wallace
- Past members: Breffni O'Rourke

Toasted Heretic were an Irish rock group who attracted a cult following in the late 1980s and 1990s. They were founded in Galway in 1985, where singer and lyricist Julian Gough was studying English and philosophy. Their best known early independent released songs include "You Make Girls Unhappy" and "LSD (Isn’t What It Used to Be)" both released on their first two EPs.

They made the top ten of the Irish Singles Chart in 1992 with "Galway and Los Angeles", written by Julian Gough about a chance meeting with Sinéad O'Connor in the entrance to Raidió Teilifís Éireann's Dublin studios.

== History ==
The band was formed in Galway in the mid-1980s and came to national attention with a self-published album, Songs for Swinging Celibates (an allusion to the Frank Sinatra album Songs for Swingin' Lovers), in 1988. The album was recorded on cassette tape via a TASCAM Portastudio in drummer and producer Neil Farrell's home, and distributed only on cassette. The album cover design was based on the design of the Tayto crisp packet.

A second album, Charm and Arrogance, was released in the same format in 1989, with its inlay card designed to resemble an addressed envelope, including a real (low value) Irish postage stamp.

By the 1990 release of "The Smug E.P.", the band had attracted a following, including DJs in RTÉ and internationally. They developed a live following, and gained a positive review in Q magazine, as well as a record contract with Liquid Records, a small Independent record label. Liquid Records released the full-length album Another Day, Another Riot (1992], the titular single, and the song Galway and Los Angeles, which reached #9 in the Irish music charts.

Toasted Heretic returned to their own independent "Bananafish" label for their last original album, 1994's Mindless Optimism, designed to resemble a Marlboro cigarette packet.

Without formally breaking up, the band went on hiatus throughout the 1990s, performing sporadically while its members pursued other interests: Farrell produced music; and Gough wrote his debut novel, Juno & Juliet (ISBN 0-385-72161-7).

In 2005 they released the compilation album Now in New Nostalgia Flavour which was a reissue of their first two albums. They again used the Tayto crisp packet as inspiration for the design of the cover and this time Tayto issued a legal letter accusing the band of Trademark infringement and demanding the destruction of all copies of the album.

== Discography ==
=== Albums ===
- Songs for Swinging Celibates (1988)
- Charm and Arrogance (1989)
- Another Day, Another Riot (1992)
- Mindless Optimism (1994)

=== Compilation album ===
- Now in New Nostalgia Flavour (2005)

=== Extended plays ===
- The Smug EP (1990)

=== Singles ===
- "Galway and Los Angeles" (1991) No.9 in Ireland b/w "Living At The Wrong Speed"
- "Another Day, Another Riot" (1992) b/w "Food For Breakfast"
- "LSD (Isn’t What It Used to Be)" (2005) b/w "Drown The Browns"

== Members ==
=== Current members ===
- Declan Collins (lead guitar)
- Neil Farrell (drums)
- Julian Gough (vocals)
- Aengus McMahon (bass guitar to 1992, then rhythm guitar)
- Barry Wallace (bass guitar from 1992)

=== Former members ===
- Breffni O'Rourke (rhythm guitar 1985-1992, 2005)
