= Sarah Hall (writer) =

British writer (born 1974)

Sarah Hall FRSL
- Born: 1974 (age 51–52); Bampton, Cumbria, England
- Education: Aberystwyth University; University of St Andrews
- Occupation: Novelist
- Writing career
- Language: English
- Notable work: The Electric Michelangelo (2004)
- Notable awards: Commonwealth Writers' Prize (2003)

Sarah Hall FRSL (born 1974) is an English novelist and short story writer. Her second novel, The Electric Michelangelo, was nominated for the 2004 Man Booker Prize. She lives in Cumbria.

== Biography ==
Hall was born in Bampton, Cumbria. She obtained a degree in English and Art History from Aberystwyth University before taking an MLitt in Creative Writing at the University of St Andrews, where she briefly taught on the undergraduate Creative Writing programme. She still teaches creative writing, regularly giving courses for the Arvon Foundation. She began her writing career as a poet, publishing poems in various literary magazines.

Her debut novel, Haweswater, is a rural tragedy about the disintegration of a community of Cumbrian hill-farmers due to the building of Haweswater Reservoir. It won the 2003 Commonwealth Writers' Prize (Overall Winner, Best First Book).

Her second novel, The Electric Michelangelo, set in early twentieth-century Morecambe Bay and Coney Island, is the biography of a fictional tattoo artist. The novel was shortlisted for the Man Booker Prize in 2004, and she was again nominated for the Commonwealth Writers Prize in 2005. In France, it was shortlisted for the Prix Femina étranger 2004.

Her third novel, The Carhullan Army, won the 2007 John Llewellyn Rhys Prize and the James Tiptree, Jr. Award, and it was shortlisted for the 2008 Arthur C. Clarke Award. In America, the novel was published under the title Daughters of the North.

Her 2009 novel How to Paint a Dead Man was longlisted for the Man Booker Prize.

Hall was selected as a residential fellow at the Civitella Ranieri Foundation. She later served as a juror for the foundation, awarding subsequent fellowships.

In 2013, she was included in the Granta list of 20 best young British novelists. In October 2013, she won the BBC National Short Story Award for "Mrs Fox". She won for a second time in 2020 for her story "The Grotesques".

In 2016, Hall was elected Fellow of the Royal Society of Literature. In 2024, she was made an Honorary Doctor of Letters by Lancaster University, for outstanding contribution to literature. She was appointed as a Professor of Creative Writing at Manchester University in March 2025.

In 2017, Hall served on the panel of judges for the Man Booker Prize.

All her novels are published by Faber & Faber. In June 2025, Faber announced that Hall's forthcoming novel, Helm, would be the first to include a 'Human Written' stamp to certify that it had no AI-generated content. Hall devised the mark and her American publisher, Mariner Books, will also use it.

Hall is a patron of Humanists UK. She has lived both in the United Kingdom and in the United States (North Carolina and Virginia), but as of July 2025, she lives in Kendal.

== Awards and nominations ==
Year	Title	Award	Category	Result	Ref.
2003	Haweswater	Betty Trask Prize and Awards	Betty Trask Award	Won	
2003	Haweswater	Commonwealth Writers' Prize	Overall Best First Book	Won	
2004	The Electric Michelangelo	Man Booker Prize	—	Shortlisted	
2004	The Electric Michelangelo	Orange Prize for Fiction	—	Longlisted	
2007	The Carhullan Army	James Tiptree Jr. Award	—	Won	
2007	The Carhullan Army	John Llewellyn Rhys Prize	—	Won	
2008	The Carhullan Army	Arthur C. Clarke Award	—	Shortlisted	
2009	The Carhullan Army	International Dublin Literary Award		Longlisted	
2009	How to Paint a Dead Man	Man Booker Prize	—	Longlisted	
2010	How to Paint a Dead Man	Portico Prize	Fiction	Won	
2010	"Butcher's Perfume"	BBC National Short Story Award	—	Shortlisted	
2012	The Beautiful Indifference: Stories	Edge Hill Short Story Prize	—	Won	
2012	The Beautiful Indifference: Stories	Frank O'Connor International Short Story Award	—	Shortlisted	
2012	The Beautiful Indifference: Stories	Portico Prize	Fiction	Won	
2013	"Mrs Fox"	BBC National Short Story Award	—	Won	
2016	The Wolf Border	James Tait Black Memorial Prize	Fiction	Shortlisted	
2017	Madame Zero: 9 Stories	East Anglian Book Awards	Fiction	Won	
2018	Madame Zero: 9 Stories	Edge Hill Short Story Prize	—	Shortlisted and won Readers' Prize	
2018	"Sudden Traveller"	BBC National Short Story Award	—	Shortlisted	
2020	"The Grotesques"	BBC National Short Story Award	—	Won	
2020	"Sudden Traveller"	Edge Hill Short Story Prize	—	Shortlisted	
2021	Burntcoat	National Book Critics Circle Award	Fiction	Finalist	
2022	Burntcoat	South Bank Sky Arts Awards	Literature	Shortlisted	
2023	Burntcoat	International Dublin Literary Award	—	Longlisted	
2025	Helm	Goldsmiths Prize	—	Shortlisted	
2026	Helm	Walter Scott Prize	—	Longlisted	
2026	Helm	Lakeland Book of the Year	—	Won	

== Bibliography ==
=== Novels ===
- —— (2002). Haweswater. London: Faber. ISBN 0571209254.
- —— (2004). The Electric Michelangelo. London: Faber. ISBN 978-0571219292.
- —— (2007). The Carhullan Army. London: Faber. ISBN 978-0571236596.
- —— (2009). How to Paint a Dead Man. London: Faber. ISBN 978-0571254538.
- —— (2015). The Wolf Border. London: Faber. ISBN 978-0571258123.
- —— (2021). Burntcoat. London: Faber. ISBN 978-0571329311.
- —— (2025). Helm. London: Faber. ISBN 978-0571383559.

=== Short story collections ===
- —— (2011). The Beautiful Indifference. London: Faber. ISBN 978-0571230174.
- —— (2014). Mrs Fox. London: Faber. ISBN 978-0571315673.
- —— (2017). Madame Zero. London: Faber. ISBN 978-0571290031.
- —— (2019). Sudden Traveller. London: Faber. ISBN 978-0571345045.

=== As contributor or editor ===
- Webb, Simon; Hall, Sarah; Bracewell, Michael (2008). The Midland Hotel. Stockport: Dewi Lewis Publishing. ISBN 978-1904587613.
- Murrell, Graham; Hall, Sarah (2011). Blackwell Within: a photographic evocation. Kendall: Abbot Hall Art Gallery. ISBN 978-1906043087.
- Hall, Sarah; Hobbs, Peter, eds. (2016). Sex and Death: Stories. London: Faber. ISBN 978-0571322428.
- Carey, Edward; Hall, Sarah; Kingsnorth, Paul; MacLeod, Alison; MacRae Burnet, Graeme; Moss, Sarah; Mozley, Fiona; Thorpe, Adam (2016). These Our Monsters And Other Stories. London: Duckworth Books. ISBN 978-1910907405.
