= K.J. Orr =

British short story writer

- Occupation: Short story writer
- Notable works: Light Box
- Notable awards: BBC National Short Story Award (2016)

Website
- kjorr.com

K. J. Orr is a British short story writer who won the 2016 BBC National Short Story Award. Her debut collection of short stories, Light Box, was published in February 2016.

== Early and personal life ==
Orr was born in London and grew up in the Midlands. She studied at the universities of St. Andrews, East Anglia and Chichester. Orr completed a creative writing programme at the University of East Anglia, and her PhD at the University of Chichester was on short story form.

She now lives in London.

== Writing career ==
Orr's short stories and essays have been published in numerous places including Sunday Times Magazine, The Irish Times, and the Guardian. She was shortlisted for the Bridport Prize for Short Stories in 2010. Orr was also shortlisted for the BBC National Short Story Award in 2011 for The Human Circadian Pacemaker.

She published her debut collection of short stories, Light Box, in February 2016. It was shortlisted for the Edge Hill Short Story Prize and the Republic of Consciousness Prize in 2017. Orr won the BBC National Short Story Award for her story Disappearances in 2016.

== Bibliography ==
- Orr, K. J. (2016). Light Box. Daunt Books Publishing.
