= Jonathan Falla =

English writer

- Born: February 9, 1954 (age 72); Mona, Jamaica
- Education: Cambridge University
- Spouse: Rona McCarthy
- Writing career
- Genre: Historical fiction, ethnography, history
- Notable works: Blue Poppies; Poor Mercy; True Love & Bartholomew
- Website: jonathanfalla.co.uk

Jonathan Falla is an English writer living in Fife, Scotland.

Falla was born in 1954 in Jamaica. He won a scholarship to study English literature and the History of Western Art at Cambridge University from 1973–77 and in 1978 began work as a language advisor and editor for an educational publisher in Bandung, Java. In 1992 he was the recipient of the first TEB Clarke award, a Senior Fulbright Fellowship in screenwriting at the University of Southern California. As a Fellow of the Royal Literary Fund he worked as an academic language advisor at Dundee University from 2006-2009, and from 2009 to 2020 was the Director of the Creative Writing Summer Schools at the University of St Andrews, Scotland. The Royal Literary Fund website carries an audio recording of him describing these summer schools. A handbook on writing fiction followed from his teaching work. From 2009 to 2024 he taught Creative Writing and Humanities for the Open University UK.

In addition to writing, he trained in paediatric and tropical nursing and has worked for aid and medical agencies in Indonesia, Nepal, Sudan, Myanmar, and Uganda. Much of his writing is informed by this experience and by extensive travels in Asia, Africa and the Americas.

He has written a number of short stories and dramas including Topokana Martyrs Day (first produced at the Bush Theatre, London, in 1982, and subsequently in Salisbury, Los Angeles, New York and for the BBC World Service). The play is a dark comedy based on his time with Oxfam during the c.1980 famine in Karamonja, Uganda, and was described by Walter Goodman in the New York Times as "An original, unflinching piece of work on a subject of desperate importance". The screenplay for The Hummingbird Tree was based on the 1969 novel by Ian McDonald, a coming-of-age story set during political turmoil in Trinidad post WW2. It was filmed by the BBC in Trinidad and first screened in 1991.

His ethnographic account of the Karen rebels in Myanmar (Burma) came out of a year training village health workers, and was published by Cambridge University Press in 1991. Its importance has been recognised by commentators. Robert H Taylor of the School of Oriental and African Studies (London) wrote in the Pacific Review: "This splendid volume is the best possible thing for trying to understand the complex, confusing and apparently unending conflict between the Karen and the government in Rangoon [Yangon]." It was described by Bertil Lintner in The Far Eastern Economic Review as "The best book about the Karens to appear in many years. Falla has done the Karens a tremendous service by providing them with the first unbiased account of their own history and culture."

In 2001, Falla published his Tibet-based debut novel, Blue Poppies. His second novel, Poor Mercy, is based on his time with the Save the Children Fund in Darfur, West Sudan, and was published in 2005. It was widely praised for its originality, drama and authenticity. He has written seven novels in total. He won the Scottish PEN David Wong short fiction prize in 2000 and was shortlisted for the National Short Story Prize for his short story The Morena, set in El Salvador during the civil war of the 1980s.

An archive of Falla's overseas notebooks, photographs and other material is held in the John Rylands Research Institute & Library at the University of Manchester. He is married and has one son.

== Publications ==
=== Fiction and Drama ===
- Blue Poppies. 11:9 Books, Glasgow. 2001. ISBN 1-903238-5-52.
- Poor Mercy. Birlinn, Edinburgh. 2005. ISBN 9781904598282.
- Glenfarron. Two Ravens Press, Ullapool. 2008. ISBN 9781906120337.
- Topokana Martyrs' Day (stage play script). Stupor Mundi. 2011.
- The Physician of Sanlúcar. Aurora Metro Books, London. 2013. ISBN 9781906582388.
- The White Porcupine. Stupor Mundi Books. 2015. ISBN 978-0-9510596-1-6.
- The Morena and Other Stories. Stupor Mundi Books. 2017.
- Terraferma: & Other Stories. Stupor Mundi. 2017. ISBN 9780951059685.
- Good News from Riga. Stupor Mundi Books. 2018. ISBN 978-1977055712.
- Wooden Baby. Stupor Mundi. 2023. ISBN 979-8-3861-7104-9
- The Hummingbird Tree (BBC Screen One screenplay 1992). Stupor Mundi Books. 2022. ISBN 9798426920255.

=== Nonfiction ===
- Hall in the Heart: A Fife village Hall and its Community. Stupor Mundi Books. 2014. ISBN 0-9510596-2-9
- Zithers, Mosquitoes: Essays & Reviews 1982-2021. Stupor Mundi Books. 29 March 1991. ISBN 978-0-521-39019-4.
- True Love and Bartholomew: Rebels on the Burmese Border. Cambridge University Press. 1991. ISBN 978-0-521-39019-4.
- The Craft of Fiction: How to Become a Novelist. Aber Publishing. 2011. ISBN 978-1-84285-104-3.
- Luck of the Devil: Flying Swordfish in WW2: the memoirs of Robert Le Page (editor). Pen & Swords Books. 2011. ISBN 9781848845442.
- Beyond the Roadblocks: Squibs & Long Shots 1984-2015. Stupor Mundi Books. 2017. ISBN 9781973521006.
- Saama: Innocents in Asia. Stupor Mundi. 2018. ISBN 9781973521006.
