= Clare Wigfall =

British writer (born 1976)

Reading the Loudest Sound and Nothing

Clare Wigfall (born 1976 in Greenwich, London) is a British writer. Her debut collection of short stories, The Loudest Sound and Nothing, was published in 2007 and longlisted for the Frank O'Connor International Short Story Award. She won the BBC National Short Story Award in 2008.

== Biography ==
Wigfall was born in London in 1976. Her father was an architect, who was posted to Berkeley, California when Wigfall was two and a half. The family lived there for five years before moving back to London. She was educated at James Allen's Girls' School. She completed a foundation year at Camberwell College of Arts. She graduated from the University of Manchester in 1998 with a degree in English and American Literature. She then completed an MA in creative writing at the University of East Anglia, where she was awarded the Curtis Brown prize.

She has lived in Prague and Edinburgh and currently lives in Berlin with her husband and three children. Her early jobs include working as assistant and editor to the then-president of Mensa and working in an art gallery.

She has taught creative writing for two decades for establishments including the Arvon Foundation and Akademie Schloss Solitude and is currently a lecturer at Bard College Berlin. She was shortlisted for the 2023 European Award for Excellence in Teaching in the Social Sciences and Humanities. She was awarded a fellowship at the Kyoto Writers Residency in 2024.

== Writing career ==
While Wigfall was studying at East Anglia, Faber & Faber offered her a book contract based on reading three unpublished stories. Almost a decade later in 2008, her debut collection, The Loudest Sound and Nothing, was published by Faber. The collection was longlisted for the 2008 Frank O'Connor International Short Story Award.

Wigfall has said that music was a large influence on this debut collection. She cites the Dirty Three, John Fahey, Jolie Holland, Bonnie "Prince" Billy, Jefferson Airplane, Cat Power, Bach, Rachel's and Six Organs of Admittance as influencing individual stories.

In 2008, Wigfall won the BBC National Short Story Award for "The Numbers", one of the stories from her collection. The story is set in the Outer Hebrides and follows a woman who recites numbers to avoid bad luck. The story was inspired by American anthropologist Margaret Fay Shaw, who studied the folklore and traditions of the Outer Hebrides.

In 2010, Wigfall received a K. Blundell Trust grant, awarded to writers under 40 for raising social consciousness through writing.

In 2011, Wigfall was longlisted for the Sunday Times Short Story Award for her story "Professor Arvind".

Her stories have also been published in Prospect, New Writing, Tatler, and The Dublin Review and commissioned for BBC Radio 4.

In 2011, she published a picture book, Has Anyone Seen My Chihuahua?, and was BookTrust's fifth online Writer in Residence.

== Works ==
=== Short story collection ===
- The Loudest Sound and Nothing, Faber & Faber, 2007, ISBN 978-0571196302

=== For children ===
- Has Anyone Seen My Chihuahua?, with Ollie Lett, Walker Books, 2011, ISBN 978-1406313895

=== As contributor ===
- The BBC National Short Story Award 2008, Short Books, 2008, ISBN 978-1906021603
- Sex and Death: Stories, edited Sarah Hall and Peter Hobbs, Faber & Faber, 2016, ISBN 978-0571322428
