= End Poem =

2011 poem by Julian Gough

The end credits of the video game Minecraft include a written work by the Irish writer Julian Gough that is conventionally called the End Poem. It is the only narrative text in the mostly unstructured sandbox game. Minecraft's creator Markus "Notch" Persson did not have an ending to the game up until a month before launch, and following recommendation by Twitter followers, he invited Gough to create a narrative for the ending. The work, which debuted in Beta version 1.9 of the game and was included with the full release, takes the form of a 1,500-word dialogue between two unspecified entities who discuss what the player has done in the game.

Gough conceived of the work as an overheard conversation which would compare the blurring of video games and real life to the space between dreaming and wakefulness, two forms of being "between two worlds". He experienced a phenomenon during writing where he felt he was not in control of his hand, and later said that "the universe" penned the latter part of the work. Originally referred to as a short story, it is now usually described as a work of poetry.

The dialogue, set in green and teal, scrolls across the player's screen over the course of about nine minutes; certain parts are obscured as intentionally glitched text. Most critical reception of the poem has been neutral to positive, often emphasising its atypicality. Several commentators have focused on its comparison of both video games and life to dreams. It has been positively received among Minecraft fans, some of whom have had quotes from it tattooed.

Gough wrote in 2022 that he never signed away his rights to the End Poem, having failed to reach an agreement with Mojang AB prior to the poem's addition to the game and then having rejected a contract in 2014 on the eve of Mojang's acquisition by Microsoft. He argued that Microsoft's continued use of the poem was copyright infringement, but said he did not want a legal dispute with them. After two psychedelic experiences with psilocybin, he said that he had a revelation following a conversation with the universe—who he attests was the true author—about the situation, and was motivated by his own words in the poem that "you are love" and the affection he had received from fans to release a version of the poem into the public domain. Microsoft has not commented on Gough's characterisation of the poem's status.

== Creation ==
Avatar of Markus Persson

Markus Persson
(@notch)
tweeted:

Are YOU a talented writer (famous is a plus ;D) who wants to write a silly over-the-top out-of-nowhere text for when you win Minecraft?

16 October 2011

In October 2011, Minecraft's creator, Markus "Notch" Persson, was preparing to launch the official version of the game, and his company Mojang had even prepared a launch event, though at that point he had no ending for the game. Persson tweeted that he was seeking someone to write "a silly over-the-top out-of-nowhere text for when you win". His followers recommended the Irish writer Julian Gough, and Persson became convinced after reading Gough's earlier short story "The iHole". Gough had played Minecraft in alpha at a game jam in Berlin years before but had not thought much of it. Gough remembered the game was only small at that time and he was unaware of its popularity until Persson emailed him about writing the ending. Gough realised how big Minecraft had become after research, which he said scared him. He downloaded the game and engaged with friends about it, taking up a "crash course" with the game to immerse himself and "get it into [his] system".

Gough remembers that Persson felt the death of the Ender Dragon should trigger a narrative, but since Persson "wasn't a word guy, and hadn't a clue what that narrative should say", Gough was given freedom in composing the work; Persson's email asked Gough to deliver a surprise. Gough was not directed to explain the origin of the Ender Dragon or deliver a comprehensive narrative tying into a greater story, which he agreed was a stark contrast from usual writing for video games. Once Gough realised his vision for the End Poem, he told Persson, who agreed with the idea: Persson had no desire for a conventional piece of writing but rather wanted an "interesting and original" work reflective of the game itself, such that it would subvert the players' expectations for the ending. Gough said that playing the game to the end in survival mode was a demanding task, and that the ending should provide enlightenment and "ambiguous wisdom", a feeling that the player had "broken through into some other level"; he felt that an overheard dialogue worked well with this concept.

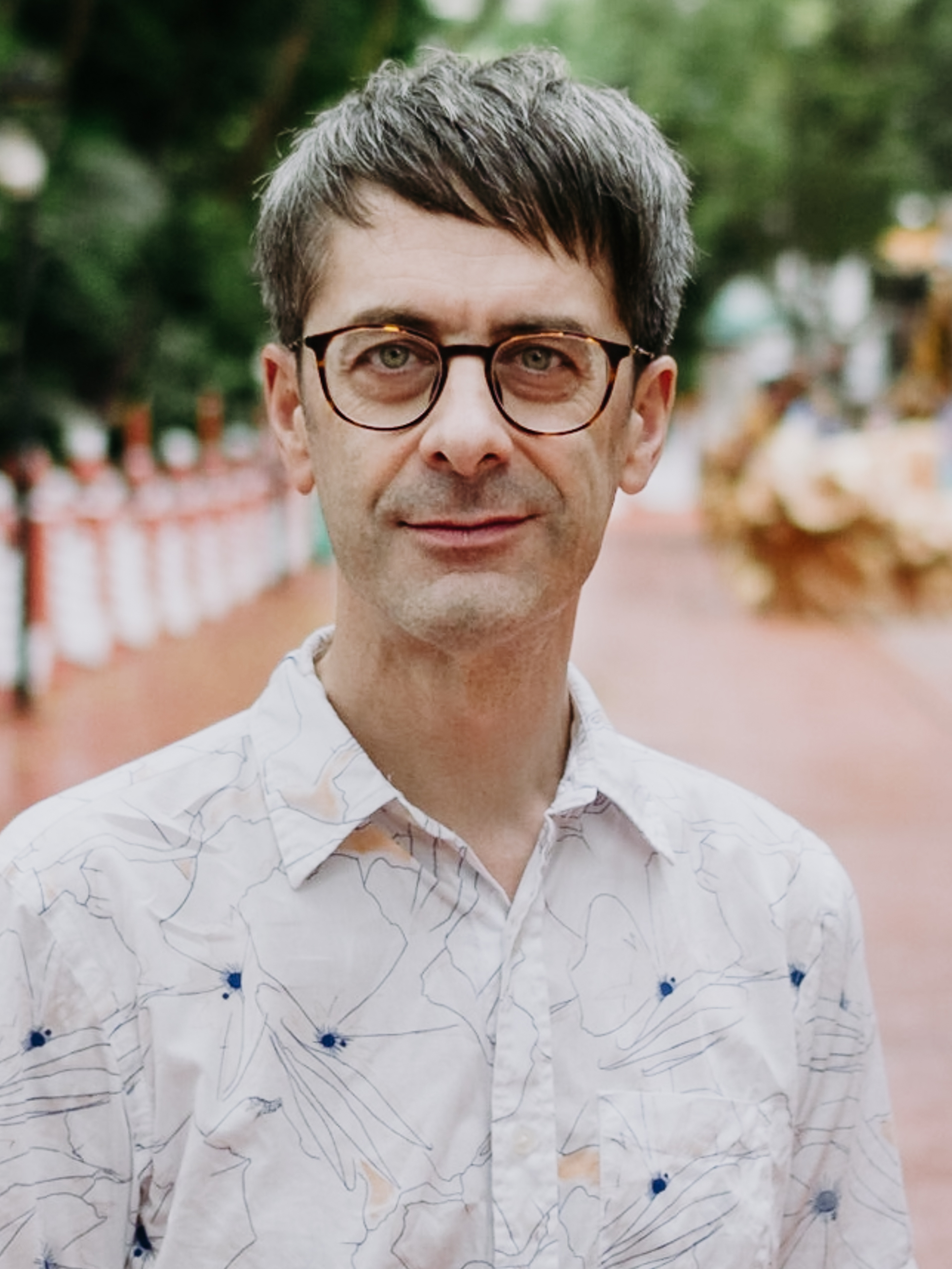
Writer Julian Gough experienced a mental phenomenon affecting his hand during the writing process, which he felt was "dictation from the universe".

Gough decided this ending should not be an explanation of the game, as players had already formed their own stories about it, but rather something outside of it. He described this work as "the dream of a game, and the dream of life". He was fond of the concept of people becoming "lost" in a video game such that it "becomes a world", a metaphor he felt was exemplified in Minecraft. As the player started to return to reality after beating the game, Gough wanted to "play with that moment, where you're between two worlds, and for a short little period you're not sure which one is more real". He felt that "there are mental states accessible through computer games that [are] similar to those accessible through drugs or meditation or religious experiences".

Gough says that the writing process was "quite odd", and that around halfway through it he felt like "my hand started moving faster than my thoughts and [I] was just watching", while his conscious mind did not know which words would "simply appear on the page" before him. He says that he changed very little in the final third of the piece because he was satisfied with what this phenomenon produced, and by the end he mused that he was "taking dictation from the universe". Upon submitting the finished work to Persson, Gough wondered if he should cut it, but Persson was pleased that it related to his philosophy of life and wanted it kept in full. It debuted alongside the rest of the end credits and the full endgame mechanics in Beta version 1.9. Gough and Persson originally referred to the untitled work as a short story, and at one point Boing Boing reported that the name "Wake Up"—a reference to the piece's final line—had taken popularity, but it came to be seen more as a poem than as prose, and by 2014 was generally referred to as the End Poem, a name Gough went on to adopt. Other sources have used the appellation "End text" or not assigned it any name.

== Use in Minecraft ==
After players kill the Ender Dragon and step into the exit portal, the poem appears on-screen. It plays alongside the track "Alpha" from C418's soundtrack album Minecraft – Volume Beta. It begins with the words "I see the player you mean" in teal and a reply of the active player's name in green, followed by about 1,500 words of dialogue between the two speakers, whose identities are never established but have been described by The Escapist as "god-like". Small portions are intentionally rendered as glitched text. The poem culminates with twelve consecutive lines starting with "and the universe said". The poem ends with: (Note: Formatted similarly to its usage in Minecraft, except with colour names added for accessibility.)

[green] and the universe said I love you because you are love.

[teal] And the game was over and the player woke up from the dream. And the player began a new dream. And the player dreamed again, dreamed better. And the player was the universe. And the player was love.

[teal] You are the player.

[green] Wake up.

External media
- A Web implementation of the poem, similar to the formatting used in Minecraft

The poem scrolls across the screen over the course of about nine minutes. It is the only narrative text in the game, and the only text of significant length oriented toward the player. Gough's original version has not been significantly modified since its creation.

== Reception ==
An early impression by Eric Limer in The Mary Sue was sharply critical, calling the End Poem "nothing but a bunch of text that scrolls down the screen excruciatingly slowly for an excruciatingly long time", which "reads like a stereotypical JRPG ending mashed up with some stuff written by a highschooler who just discovered post-modernist literature". Subsequent commentary leans more favourable: Kevin Thielenhaus in The Escapist calls the poem "mysterious, and kind of weird, and probably not what most of us were expecting from a Minecraft ending". The Atlantic's James Parker calls it "a goofy/beautiful metaphysical text". Ted Litchfield in PC Gamer describes it as "warm and humanistic" and compares it to the 2015 video game Undertale and the 2017 multimedia narrative 17776. Lori Landay, writing in the anthology Revisiting Imaginary Worlds, calls it "weird" and unlike anything else "except maybe" the ending of Battlestar Galactica (2004)". In Boing Boing, writer Tom Chatfield compared the ending to the film Inception in the way that it dealt with the experience of "coming up" after being in a game world, capturing "this image of someone falling in slow motion as music grows louder around them". Gough himself has called the work an "oddity" and "peculiar".

Jason Anthony in gamevironments and Matthew Horrigan in Acta Ludologica both highlight the End Poem's comparison of video games to dreams; Anthony also discusses the poem's relevance to the theological implications of Minecraft players' ability to create and destroy worlds. Jacob Creswell in Comic Book Resources analyses the poem's commentary on dreams and its reference to life as "the long dream" in comparison to "the short dream of a game". Creswell notes the dissimilarity between the lengthy poem and the minimalist game, but concludes that they fit well together, writing that "[t]he poem disagrees with the idea that the player is nothing compared to the grand scale of the universe" and that "[t]he game's code creates a world that players invest time and care into, much like their real lives". Similarly, in MIT Technology Review, Simon Parkin observes that most players will never encounter the poem in-game, but finds that the two share a sentiment of creation through dream, which Parkin views as revealing the game's "somewhat evangelical" nature.

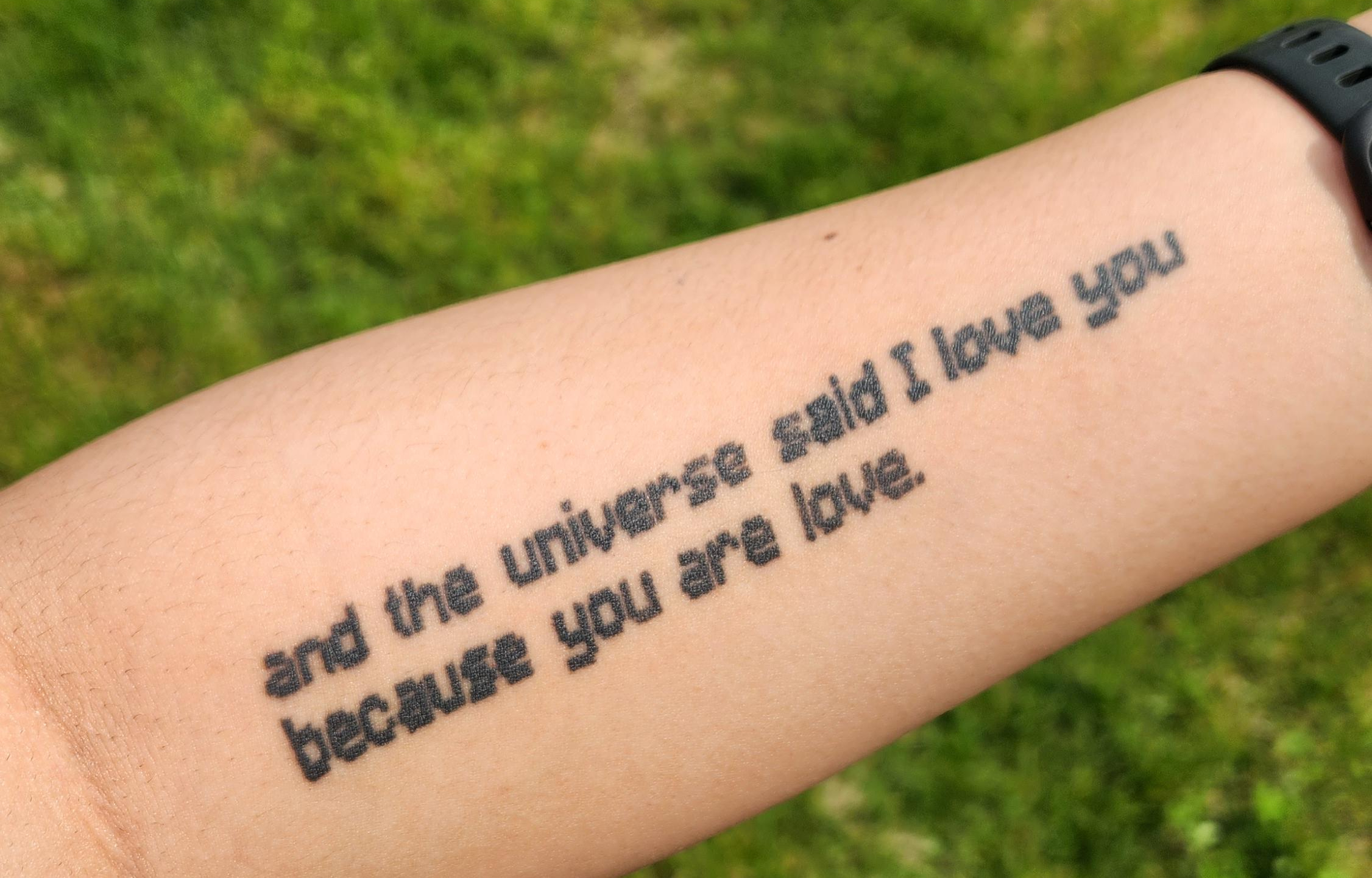
A tattoo quoting from the poem, set in a font similar to Minecraft's. Gough used an image of the same tattoo when discussing the poem's impact.

Landay, agreeing with Parkin, reads the poem as a reward for making it to the End and finds it to echo her own thoughts about dreams and video games. She points to its rhythmic nature to explain why the text is often called a poem, even though Persson and Gough had initially called it a story, and compares it to a prayer or meditation through its repetition, as in the closing "And the universe" lines. Regarding the final exhortation to "Wake up", Landay writes that some interpret it as a call to do things offline, while others view it in the context of the myth of Herobrine, a supposed supernatural Minecraft mob. While Gough was not aware of the Herobrine legend, the two are combined by some in the community into a shared "mythology and genealogy". Landay views this reading as "one more thread" in the poem's metanarrative, part of Gough's commentary on the transition from game to real life, citing his comments to Chatfield about playing with the "moment where you're between two worlds, and for a short little period you're not sure which one is more real".

The Irish Independent describes the End Poem as revered by the Minecraft community, and RTÉ reports it to have been widely quoted by fans of the game. A number of fans have tattoos of excerpts, particularly from the "and the universe said" portion, which Gough has described as "beyond moving".

In 2026, the newly launched United States Government chatbot, America.gov, started to paraphrase the End Poem with a government-themed spin when it was asked about Minecraft; TechCrunch speculated that programmer Edward "Big Balls" Coristine may have been involved, as United States president Donald Trump stated he served as lead engineer on the project. This response was later removed from the website.

== Ownership and copyright status ==
In a December 2022 post on his blog, The Egg and the Rock, Gough wrote that he had never signed any contract with Persson's Mojang AB over the poem. He recalled rather relying on an informal agreement that Mojang could use it in the existing Windows and OS X versions of the game. Gough said he corresponded with Mojang managing director Carl Manneh about signing a formal agreement, but approached their talks as casual conversations rather than formal contract negotiations, something he considered a mistake. He said these talks failed because he had misunderstood the context, and that he should have let his agent handle it. Gough said he was paid a flat sum of €20,000 (equivalent to €25,749 in 2023) and the End Poem was implemented into the game without a contract signed. He said that a month after the game's release, he was finally sent a contract to sign his rights to the poem away, but refused due to the preemptive use of the poem before he had been sent a contract, and because of his discontent with the way talks had gone.

According to Gough, he was approached in August 2014 to sign over the poem as a "housekeeping" matter, and upon finally taking the time to read the contract, found the comprehensive buyout to be "worse than I'd even imagined". At that point unaware of the context that Mojang was being purchased by Microsoft, Gough learned of the buyout in a leaked news story, and further email exchanges followed. The full legal implications of the resulting situation were unclear, and Gough wrote that he did not wish to have any legal dispute with Microsoft. He refused to sign over the rights, and Microsoft bought Mojang anyway and kept using the poem. Gough says that Persson and Manneh had paid for his time and writing experience, not permanent ownership, and that Microsoft would have needed to work out a separate deal with his agent for their use, but they did not. In Gough's view, Microsoft's continued use of the poem violated the Digital Millennium Copyright Act, a law they had lobbied for. Free software commentator Glyn Moody concurred that Microsoft likely infringed on Gough's copyright.

I renounce my right to [hold copyright to the End Poem]. The universe wrote that ending, and the universe owns it. Which is to say both that nobody owns it, and we all own it. Which is to say, it lives outside of that way of looking at art.

— Gough on his decision to "formally liberate the End Poem from the corporate economy"

Gough recalled his reluctance to include the line "and the universe said I love you because you are love" (Note: Misquoted in Gough's essay as "The universe loves you because you are love") because he did not believe it at the time; however, his thoughts changed after two psychedelic experiences with psilocybin near Apeldoorn, Netherlands. He recalls telling "the universe" to "forget about what I want; just give me whatever you think I need", and it gave him advice about the situation with Minecraft and Microsoft, and also about the public. He stated that he realised that he had been hiding from the love that fans had expressed for the poem and that he had to "complete the circuit" and accept their gratitude. As a result of his psilocybin-induced realisation, he placed the poem (specifically the version he had sent Persson) into the public domain using a CC0 dedication.

Gough alleges Microsoft did not respond to inquiry from an unnamed global news organisation to comment about Gough's blog post, which Gough alleges was done to avoid the Streisand effect, and allegedly led the news organisation to "los[e] their nerve" about running a piece that would have confirmed his narrative. Jez Corden of Windows Central expressed scepticism that a lack of comment would have exerted any pressure on such an organisation. Sean Hollister of The Verge speculated that the obstacle for news organisations was the difficulty of verifying that Gough had never signed a contract. Gough has also said that he received PayPal donations from Microsoft employees following his release of the End Poem, as well as messages of solidarity from writers and other creatives who feel "screwed over" by companies controlling their work.
