= Lisa Blower =

British writer

- Occupation: Short story writer; novelist; lecturer
- Notable works: Sitting Ducks (2016); It’s Gone Dark over Bill’s Mother’s (2019)
- Notable awards: Arnold Bennett Book Prize (2020)

Website
- www.lisablower.co.uk

Lisa Blower is a British writer who won the Arnold Bennett Book Prize in 2020 for her short story collection It's Gone Dark over Bill's Mother's.

== Early life ==
Blower grew up in Stoke-on-Trent.

== Career ==
Blower is a creative writing lecturer at Keele University.

In 2009, her short story Broken Crockery won the Guardian Weekend's summer short fiction special. She was shortlisted for the BBC National Short Story Award for her story Barmouth in 2013.

Her debut novel, Sitting Ducks, was published in 2016 and shortlisted for the Arnold Bennett Book Prize in 2017. Blower's debut short story collection, It's Gone Dark over Bill's Mother's, published in 2019 is set in Stoke-on-Trent. It won the Arnold Bennett Book Prize and was longlisted for the Edge Hill Short Story Prize in 2020. Blower published the novel Pondweed in 2020. i
