= Colwill Brown =

Writer

- Born: Doncaster, Yorkshire, England
- Education: Boston College (MA); University of Texas at Austin (MFA)
- Occupations: Short story writer; novelist
- Writing career
- Notable work: We Pretty Pieces of Flesh
- Notable awards: BBC National Short Story Award Winner (2025)
- Website: colwillbrown.me

Colwill Brown is a British short story writer and novelist. Her debut novel, We Pretty Pieces of Flesh, was shortlisted for the Goldsmiths Prize and Center for Fiction First Novel Prize. She previously won the 2025 BBC National Short Story Award.

== Early life and education ==
Brown was born and raised in Doncaster, Yorkshire. She received an MA in English literature from Boston College followed by an MFA in creative writing from the University of Texas at Austin, where she received a James A. Michener Fellowship.

== Writing career ==
We Pretty Pieces of Flesh, Brown's debut novel, was published by Henry Holt and Co. in 2025. The book was shortlisted for the Goldsmiths Prize, the Center for Fiction First Novel Prize, and the Dylan Thomas Prize. It was also longlisted for the Gordon Burn Prize and the PEN/Hemingway Award for Debut Novel in 2026. Brown's novel was listed by The Guardian as a "Best Fiction of 2025" and by The London Magazine as a "Best Books of 2025".

Brown's short story "You Cannot Thread a Moving Needle" won the BBC National Short Story Award in 2025.

Her work has appeared in Granta, Prairie Schooner, and other publications.

== Personal life ==
For fifteen years, Brown has lived with ME/CFS, a debilitating neurological disease triggered by a virus that, due to systemic medical neglect, currently has no treatment.

== Bibliography ==
=== Poems ===
- Brown, Colwill (2021), "Inheritance | Locks", Prairie Schooner, vol. 95, no. 2

=== Short stories ===
- Brown, Colwill (2020). "Knickers". Granta.
- Brown, Colwill (2025). "You Cannot Thread a Moving Needle". BBC National Short Story Award 2025.

=== Novels ===
- Brown, Colwill (2025). We Pretty Pieces of Flesh. Henry Holt and Co. ISBN 9781250342881.
