= Staffrider =

South African literary magazine

Staffrider Magazine
- Editor: Mothobi Mutloatse, Mike Kirkwood, Kay Hassan
- Categories: Literary magazine
- Frequency: infrequent
- Founder: Mike Kirkwood
- Founded: 1978
- First issue: March 1978
- Final issue: 1996
- Country: South Africa
- Language: English

Staffrider was a South African literary magazine that was published between 1978 and 1996.

== History and profile ==
Staffrider was first published in March 1978. Its founder was Mike Kirkwood. The magazine took its name from slang for people hanging outside or on the roof of overcrowded, racially segregated trains.

It was one of the most important literary presences of the 1970s and 1980s, aiming to be popular rather than elite was consciously non-racial in the segregated apartheid era. Borrowing its name and image from township slang for black youth who rode the over-crowded African sections of the racially segregated commuter trains by hanging onto the outside or sitting on the roofs, Staffrider had two main objectives: to provide publishing opportunities for community-based organizations and young writers, graphic artists and photographers; and to oppose officially sanctioned state and establishment culture.

Produced by The Durban Moment that saw Steve Biko begin the South African Students' Organisation, Staffrider had a view of literature with a small "l": its base was popular rather than elite and it sought to provide an autobiography of experience in its witness of daily black life in South Africa. The magazine's nonracial policy and choice of English as a non-ethnic mode of communication attracted a cross-section of writers, artists and other contributors to the magazine. Debates around Staffrider′s "self-editing" editorial policy were ongoing and the magazine eventually adopted quality control measures under the editorship of Chris van Wyk. However, the magazine's early flexibility ensured that the work of previously unpublished writers and artists appeared alongside that of many South African notables including Nadine Gordimer, Lionel Abrahams, Rose Zwi, Biddy Partridge, and Mtutuzeli Matshoba.

Related activities included the "Staffrider Series", a book series comprising almost thirty stand-alone books (including "anthologies, novels, short stories and poetry"), published by the Ravan Press, and the Staffrider photography exhibition, which was "mounted annually from 1983-1985" and again in 1988.

Staffrider ceased publication in 1996.

== Sources ==
- Oliphant, Andries, and I. Vladislavic (eds), Ten Years of Staffrider, Johannesburg: Ravan Press, 1988.
- Oliphant, Andries. Staffrider Magazine and Popular History: The Opportunities and Challenges of Personal Testimony. Johannesburg: Temple University Press, 1991.
- Gardiner, Michael. South African Literary Magazines, 1956–1978. Warren Siebrits Modern and Contemporary Art: Johannesburg, 2004.
- "Rose Zwi in conversation with Mothobi Mutloatse". Interview conducted 9 September 2006.
- Gwala, Mafika. Writing as a Cultural Weapon, in Momentum, Margaret Daymond, Johan Jacobs, and Margaret Lenta (eds), Pietermaritzburg: University of Natal Press, 1985. 375–3.
- Manganyi, Chabani N. Looking Through the Keyhole. Johannesburg: Ravan Press, 1981
- Mutloatse, Mothobi. Forced Landing. Johannesburg: Ravan Press, 1980.
- Ndebele, Njabulo. Rediscovery of the Ordinary. Johannesburg: Congress of South African Writers, 1991.
- Newell, Stephanie. Readings in African Popular Fiction. Bloomington: Indiana University Press, 2002.
