= Jo Lloyd =

Welsh short story writer

- Occupation: Short story writer
- Notable works: The Earth, Thy Great Exchequer, Ready Lies
- Notable awards: BBC National Short Story Award (2019)

Jo Lloyd is a Welsh writer who won the 2019 BBC National Short Story Award. She won an O. Henry Award in 2018. Her debut short story collection, The Earth, Thy Great Exchequer, Ready Lies, was shortlisted for the 2021 Edge Hill Short Story Prize.

== Biography ==
Lloyd grew up in south Wales and now lives there.

== Writing career ==
Lloyd's stories have been published in Ploughshares, Southern Review, and Zoetrope: All-Story, and broadcast on BBC Radio. She won the Asham Award, the Willesden Herald International Short Story Prize, and a McGinnis-Ritchie Award, and was selected for Best British Short Stories in 2012.

In 2018, Lloyd's story "The Earth Thy Great Exchequer Ready Lies", originally published in Zoetrope: All-Story, won an O. Henry Award. The story is set in the 1700s and was inspired by the life of Sir Humphrey Mackworth.

In 2019, Lloyd won the BBC National Short Story Award for her short story "The Invisible". The story is set in rural Wales and is based on the life of Martha'r Mynydd, an eighteenth-century woman from Carnarvonshire who said that she was visited by an invisible family.

Lloyd's debut short story collection, The Earth, Thy Great Exchequer, Ready Lies, was published in 2021. In the US, the collection was published under the title Something Wonderful. The collection was shortlisted for the 2021 Edge Hill Short Story Prize.

== Works ==
=== Short story collections ===
- The Earth, Thy Great Exchequer, Ready Lies, Swift Press, 2021, ISBN 978-1800750104
- Something Wonderful, Tin House Books, 2021, ISBN 978-1951142728

=== As contributor ===
- The O Henry Prize Stories 2018, ed. Laura Furman, Knopf Doubleday, 2018, ISBN 978-0525436584
- The BBC National Short Story Award 2019, Comma Press, 2019, ISBN 978-1912697229
- Duets, Scratch Books, 2024, ISBN 978-1739830168
