= The White Review =

British literary magazine

- Issue 8
- Editor: Rosanna McLaughlin, Izabella Scott, Skye Arundhati Thomas
- Design & Art Direction: Thomas Swann
- Assistant Editor: Samir Chada
- Former editors: Benjamin Eastham, Jacques Testard
- Categories: Literature and the visual arts
- Frequency: Quarterly
- Founder: Benjamin Eastham, Jacques Testard
- First issue: February 2011; 15 years ago
- Company: The White Review Ltd
- Country: United Kingdom
- Based in: London
- Language: English
- Website: thewhitereview.org
- ISSN: 2634-5544
- OCLC: 957136213

The White Review was a London-based quarterly magazine of literature and the visual arts. Taking its name from La Revue Blanche, a Parisian magazine which ran from 1889 to 1903, it was published in print and online between 2011 and 2024.

== History ==
=== Founding ===
The White Review was founded by editors Benjamin Eastham and Jacques Testard, and released its first issue in print in February 2011. The quarterly print edition was originally designed Ray O'Meara, and carries poetry, short fiction, essays and interviews alongside photography and art. Since 2013 and 2017, The White Review has administered the influential The White Review Short Story and Poetry Prize respectively. The White Review website is frequently updated with new web-only content and excerpts from the print edition. The website, like the print edition, carries essays, interviews, poetry and fiction.

In an interview with Creative Review, the founding editors stated that The White Review was intended as "a space for a new generation to express itself unconstrained by form, subject or genre". Talking to US-based magazine Bookforum, they explained that they were inspired to establish a British-based equivalent to publications including n+1, Guernica, Cabinet, The Paris Review and Bomb, while an early interview with It's Nice That quoted them as saying that the magazine would endeavour to "stay close to new writing and emerging art".

=== Redesign ===
After 20 print issues, The White Review's print iteration and website were redesigned, and a new editorial team, led by Francesca Wade and Željka Marošević, was introduced. Following a successful crowdfunding campaign, and in response to the paucity of space for arts and literature criticism in UK publications, The White Review began publishing book and art show reviews on its website in 2017.

=== Hiatus ===
In September 2023, The White Review announced that it would be "ceasing its day-to-day publishing" and undergoing an indefinite hiatus, citing the removal of funding from the Arts Council England and broader macroeconomic hardship. Its final publication was The White Review Writing in Translation Anthology, published in March 2024.

== Interviews ==
Each issue of the journal includes long-form interviews with writers and artists. Notable interview subjects have included Annie Ernaux, Margo Jefferson, Jenny Offill, Claudia Rankine, Elmgreen and Dragset, George Saunders, Michael Hardt, Tom McCarthy, Paula Rego, Hari Kunzru, André Schiffrin, Will Self, Marina Warner, Chris Kraus, Sophie Calle, Deborah Levy, Rachel Cusk, and Richard Wentworth. The website has also carried interviews with David Graeber, Jonathan Safran Foer, DBC Pierre, Cornelia Parker, Wayne Koestenbaum, and others.

== Contributors ==
Notable contributors have included Ned Beauman, Joshua Cohen, John Ashbery, Chris Kraus, Lee Rourke, Anne Carson, Sally Rooney, Hatty Nestor, Leslie Jamison, China Miéville, Alice Oswald, Dorothea Lasky, Adam Thirlwell, and Laszlo Krasznahorkai.

== The White Review Prizes ==
In 2013, The White Review Short Story Prize was launched to find and foster new British and Irish writing talent. It is an annual short story competition for emerging writers who "explore and expand the possibilities of the short story form ... the prize was founded to reward ambitious, imaginative and innovative approaches to creative writing." The prize is supported by Jerwood Foundation and awards £2500 to the best piece of short fiction by a writer resident in the UK and Ireland who has yet to secure a publishing deal. The winner will also be published in a print issue of The White Review. Many winners and shortlisted writers have since published novels and become acclaimed.

The White Review Poet's Prize was introduced in 2017, and was launched to recognise and celebrate English-language poets who are at the crucial stage of creating their debut pamphlet or collection, and to encourage poetry that explores and expands the possibilities of the page-poetry form.

=== 2013 ===
The 2013 inaugural prize was awarded on 25 April 2013. The judges were Deborah Levy, Jonathan Cape editorial director Alex Bowler and literary agent Karolina Sutton.

- Winner: Claire-Louise Bennett for "The Lady of the House"
- Shortlist: Gareth Dickson, Jonathan Gibbs, Olivia Heal, Scott Morris, Luke Neima, Stacy Patton, J. D. A. Winslow

=== 2014 ===
The 2014 prize was awarded on 30 April 2014. The judges were Kevin Barry, Max Porter and literary agent Anna Webber.

- Winner: Ruby Cowling for "Biophile"
- Shortlist: Paul Currion, Steven J Fowler, David Isaacs, Joseph Mackertich, Luke Neima, Brenda Parker, Eley Williams

=== 2015 ===
The 2015 prize was awarded on 30 April 2015. The judges were Ned Beauman, literary agent Lucy Luck and Serpent's Tail publisher Hannah Westland.

- Winner: Owen Booth for "I Told You I'd Buy You Anything You Wanted So You Asked For A Submarine Fleet"
- Shortlist: David Isaacs, Paul McQuade, Luke Melia, Nick Mulgrew, Chris Newlove Horton, Joanna Quinn, Eley Williams

=== 2016 ===
The 2016 prize was awarded on 21 April 2016. The judges were Eimear McBride, literary agent Imogen Pelham and Hamish Hamilton publisher Simon Prosser.

- Winner: Sophie Mackintosh for "Grace"
- Shortlist: Victoria Manifold, Chris Newlove Horton, Uschi Gatward, Karina Lickorish Quinn, Leon Craig, Naomi Frisby, David Isaacs

=== 2017 ===
The 2017 Short Story Prize was awarded to both a UK and Ireland winner, as well as a US and Canada winner, with two respective shortlists and judging panels. The UK and Ireland judges were Jon Day, Joe Dunthorne and Faber and Faber publisher Mitzi Angel. The US and Canada judges were Hari Kunzru, literary agent Anna Stein and New Directions publisher Barbara Epler. Both winners were awarded in May 2017. The White Review Poet's Prize was also introduced in 2017, and was launched to recognise and celebrate English-language poets who are at the crucial stage of creating their debut pamphlet or collection, and to encourage poetry that explores and expands the possibilities of the page-poetry form. The 2017 judges were Kayo Chingonyi, Vahni Capildeo and Penguin Books editor Donald Futers. The poetry winner was awarded on 7 December 2017.

- Winner (UK and Ireland): Nicole Flattery for "Tracks"
- Shortlist (UK and Ireland): Liam Cagney, Thomas Chadwick, Christopher Burkham, David Isaacs, Ed Lately, Lauren van Schaik, Anna Glendenning
- Winner (US & Canada): Kristen Gleason for "The Refugee"
- Shortlist (US & Canada): Alexander Slotnick, Rav Grewal-Kök, Giada Scodellaro, Annie Julia Wyman, Ethan Davison, Devyn Defoe, Ari Braverman
- Winner (Poetry): Lucy Mercer
- Shortlist (Poetry): Genevieve Carver, Helen Charman, Seraphima Kennedy, Harriet Moore, Jake Orbison, Jake Reynolds, Lavinia Singer

=== 2018 ===
The 2018 Short Story Prize was awarded on 17 May 2018. The judges were Chloe Aridjis, Sam Byers, Daunt Books publisher Želkja Marošević, Granta editor Anne Meadows and literary agent Sophie Scard. The 2018 Poetry judges were Kayo Chingonyi, Anne Boyer and Lavinia Greenlaw. The poetry winner was awarded on 6 December 2018.

- Winner (Short Story): Julia Armfield for "The Great Awake"
- Shortlist (Short Story): Matthew Beaumont, Susannah Dickey, Jenny Karlsson, Victoria Manifold, Tabitha Siklos, Lyndsey Smith, Rebecca Watson
- Winner (Poetry): Charlotte Geater
- Shortlist (Poetry): Tolu Agbelusi, Hal Coase, Hugh Foley, Eloise Hendy, Caitlin Newby, Aea Varfis-van Warmelo, Jay Gao

=== 2019 ===
The 2019 Short Story Prize was awarded on 25 April 2019. The judges were Chris Power, literary agent Sophie Scard, and Jonathan Cape publishing director Michal Shavit. The 2019 poetry judges were Kayo Chingonyi, Rachel Allen and Ariana Reines. The poetry winner was awarded on 5 December 2019.

- Winner (Short Story): Vanessa Onwuemezi for "At the Heart of Things"
- Shortlist (Short Story): Salma Ahmad, Rachel Bower, Catherine Mitchell, Saba Sams, Sarah Trounce, Stephen Walsh
- Winner (Poetry): Kaleem Hawa
- Shortlist (Poetry): Beth Dynowski, Maia Elsner, Flora de Falbe, Dane Holt, Julie Irigaray, Laura O'Callaghan-White, Yvette Siegert, Dahmicca Wright
