= Nick Mulgrew =

South African-British writer

- Born: Durban, South Africa
- Occupations: Writer and publisher
- Years active: 2013—
- Awards: Nadine Gordimer Award, K. Sello Duiker Memorial Award
- Website: nickmulgrew.co.za

Nick Mulgrew (born 1990) is a South African-British short story writer, novelist, poet, and editor. In addition to his writing, he is the founder and director of the poetry press uHlanga.

== Education ==
Mulgrew studied English and Journalism at Rhodes University, Makhanda, and later at the University of Cape Town, at which he was a Mandela Rhodes Scholar. In 2024, he completed his PhD at the University of Dundee.

== Writing ==
Mulgrew's first collection of short stories, Stations, was published in 2016 when he was 25. The book was longlisted for the 2017 Edge Hill Short Story Prize and shortlisted for the 2017 Nadine Gordimer Award. Mulgrew went on to win the 2018 Nadine Gordimer Award with his second collection of stories, The First Law of Sadness, published in 2017.

Mulgrew's stories have also appeared in The White Review, World Literature Today, and New Contrast. In 2015, he was shortlisted for White Review short story prize for his story "Posman". In 2023, he was shortlisted for the BBC National Short Story Award for his story, "The Storm".

His first novel, A Hibiscus Coast, was published in South Africa by Karavan Press in 2021. In 2022, this novel won the K. Sello Duiker Memorial Award, for a novel or novella by a writer under the age of forty. In 2023, Karavan press published his second novel, Tunnel.

Mulgrew's first poetry collection, the myth of this is that we're all in this together, was published by uHlanga in 2015. In 2023, he published a collection of prose poems, Panic Attacks.

== Publishing ==
In 2014, Mulgrew founded the poetry press uHlanga, which he operates and directs. Mulgrew commissions and designs all of the press's books, and edits most of them.

uHlanga has launched the careers in publication of many South African poets, most notably Maneo Mohale and Koleka Putuma, who are both winners of the Glenna Luschei Prize for African Poetry for titles published by uHlanga.

The press's authors and books have also won various South African awards, including two Ingrid Jonker Prizes (for Failing Maths and My Other Crimes by Thabo Jijana and Zikr by Saaleha Idrees Bamjee) and two South African Literary Awards for Poetry (for Prunings by Helen Moffett and All the Places by Musawenkosi Khanyile).

Mulgrew was a founding associate editor of the Cape Town-based literary magazine Prufrock, and continued to be its fiction editor until it ceased publication.

== Other work ==
From 2013 to 2015, Mulgrew was the beer critic for South African Sunday Times.

== Awards and recognition ==
- 2014/2015: South African Arts Journalist of the Year Award (nominee)
- 2014: National Arts Festival Short Sharp Stories Award
- 2014: South African Arts Journalism Awards Special Silver Merit for Features
- 2015: White Review Prize (shortlist)
- 2016: Thomas Pringle Award for Short Stories
- 2017: Edge Hill Short Story Prize (longlist)
- 2017: Nadine Gordimer Award (shortlist)
- 2018: Nadine Gordimer Award
- 2022: K. Sello Duiker Memorial Award
- 2023: BBC National Short Story Award (shortlist)

== Bibliography ==
=== Novels ===
- A Hibiscus Coast (2021)
- Tunnel (2023)

=== Short story collections ===
- Stations (2016)
- The First Law of Sadness (2017)

=== Poetry ===
- the myth of this is that we're all in this together (2015)
- Panic Attacks (2023)
