= Saba Sams =

British writer

- Born: Saba Spiral Sams; 24 April 1996 (age 30)
- Education: University of Manchester (BA); Birkbeck, University of London (MA)
- Children: 3

Saba Spiral Sams (born 24 April 1996) is an English writer. Her debut short story collection Send Nudes (2022) won the Edge Hill Prize. This was followed by her debut novel Gunk (2025).

== Early life and education ==
Sams grew up in Brighton. Her name Saba is a nod to her Syrian heritage. She described her family as "creative". Her parents divorced, when she was 11.

Sams attended Brighton College. She went on to graduate with a Bachelor of Arts (BA) from the University of Manchester and a Master of Arts (MA) from Birkbeck, University of London, both in Creative Writing.

== Career ==
At age 22, Sams was offered her first book deal with Bloomsbury Publishing, through which her debut short story collection titled Send Nudes was published in 2022. Send Nudes won the Edge Hill Prize. One of the stories in the book "Blue 4eva" won the 2022 BBC National Short Story Award. Her writing has also appeared in outlets such as Granta, The Stinging Fly, and The White Review. Sams appeared on the Granta Best Young British Novelists list in 2023, the youngest on the list.

In 2025, Sams published her debut novel Gunk via the Bloomsbury Circus imprint. The novel follows club manager Jules, her ex-husband Leon, and a young club employee Nim as Jules steps in to support Nim through her pregnancy. Sams felt compelled to write based on her interest in "nontraditional families", her own isolating experience of young motherhood, and the cost of living crisis, saying "everyone's rethinking how the family looks… 'Where's the village? We need the village'. It's just not working." Gunk was a Service95 Book Club pick.

== Personal life ==
Sams lives in Bethnal Green, East London. She has three sons, the first born when she was 22 years old.

== Bibliography ==
=== Novels ===
- Gunk (2025)

=== Collections ===
- —— (2022). Send Nudes (hardcover 1st ed.). London: Bloomsbury Publishing. ISBN 9781526621771.
