= Alison MacLeod =

Canadian-British writer

Alison MacLeod is a Canadian British literary fiction writer. She is most noted for her 2013 novel Unexploded, a longlisted nominee for the 2013 Man Booker Prize, and her 2017 short story collection All the Beloved Ghosts, a shortlisted finalist for the Governor General's Award for English-language fiction at the 2017 Governor General's Awards. MacLeod is an occasional contributor to BBC Radio 4, The Sunday Times and The Guardian, and has appeared at numerous literary festivals in the UK and internationally.

== Background ==
Born in Montreal, Quebec of Nova Scotian parents and raised in Montreal and Halifax, Nova Scotia, MacLeod has lived in Brighton, England since 1987. She is a citizen of both Canada and the United Kingdom.

She studied English literature at Mount Saint Vincent University in Halifax and later, completed a masters in creative writing and a Ph.D. at the University of Lancaster. She was professor of contemporary fiction at the University of Chichester until 2018, and is now a visiting professor. She is a Fellow of the Royal Literary Fund.

== Career ==
MacLeod published her debut novel, The Changeling, in 1996. It is the story of the 18th-century historical figure Anne Bonny, a cross-dressing woman who was sentenced to hang for piracy.

Her second novel, The Wave Theory of Angels (2005), explored a 13th-century theological uproar and, in a parallel storyline, controversies in early 21st-century particle physics.

In 2007, MacLeod published her first short story collection, Fifteen Modern Tales of Attraction, featuring fifteen stories on the complications of desire.

In 2013, she received international attention for her third novel Unexploded. It was longlisted for the 2013 Man Booker Prize for Fiction, adapted for BBC Radio and named one of the Observer Books of the Year. It presents a non-triumphalist perspective on the early years of the second world war in Britain, confronting the bigotry that can unfold at times of national strife. It received positive reviews, including: "a piece of finely wrought ironwork, uncommonly delicate but at the same time astonishingly strong and tensile; it's a novel of staggering elegance and beauty" and "Like her modernist forebears, Macleod knows that life and death, the terrible and the mundane always co-exist – her genius lies in illustrating these truths while simultaneously spinning a bona fide pageturner."

MacLeod published her second short story collection, All the Beloved Ghosts, in 2017. Named one of The Guardian's "Best Books of 2017", it was described as an "exceptionally accomplished collection" that blends fiction, biography and memoir. It was shortlisted for the Edge Hill Short Story Prize and Canada’s Governor General’s award for fiction.

A story from this collection, "The Heart of Denis Noble", was shortlisted for the 2011 BBC National Short Story Award. The story features a fictionalised version of biologist Denis Noble recovering from a heart attack.

MacLeod published her next novel, Tenderness, in 2021. The novel tells the story of D. H. Lawrence's Lady Chatterley's Lover from conception through to the indecency trial, with its title taken from Lawrence's working title for his novel. Reviews said that the book "pulls off a magnificent nonlinear spin on Lady Chatterley's Lover and the censorship of literature during D. H. Lawrence's life and beyond... this places MacLeod among the best of contemporary novelists." It traces "Lady Chatterley's sources in the thickets of Lawrence's own biography, then follows its tortured progress towards the light through the indecency trial," where in her last days before becoming first lady, Jackie Kennedy, to honor a novel she loves, attends the trial. Tenderness was on the New York Times "Best Historical Novels of 2021" and "The Season's Best New Historical Novels" lists.

== Awards ==
- 2011 BBC National Short Story Award Shortlist for "The Heart of Denis Noble"
- 2013 Man Booker Prize Longlist for Unexploded, Hamish Hamilton
- 2016 Eccles British Library Writer in Residence Award
- 2017 Governor General's Award for English-language fiction Shortlist for All the Beloved Ghosts
- 2017 Edge Hill Short Story Prize Shortlist for All the Beloved Ghosts

== Selected bibliography ==
=== Novels ===
- —— (1996). The Changeling. St. Martin's Press. ISBN 9780333624845.
- —— (2005). The Wave Theory of Angels. Penguin Canada. ISBN 9780241142615.
- —— (2013). Unexploded. Hamish Hamilton. ISBN 9780241142639.
- —— (2021). Tenderness. Bloomsbury Publishing. ISBN 9781526648181.

=== Short story collections ===
- —— (2007). Fifteen Modern Tales of Attraction. Penguin Books. ISBN 9780141016061.
- —— (2017). All the Beloved Ghosts. Bloomsbury Publishing. ISBN 9781408863787.

=== As contributor ===
- The BBC National Short Story Award 2011. Comma Press. 2011. ISBN 9781905583416.
