= Miroslav Penkov =

Bulgarian writer

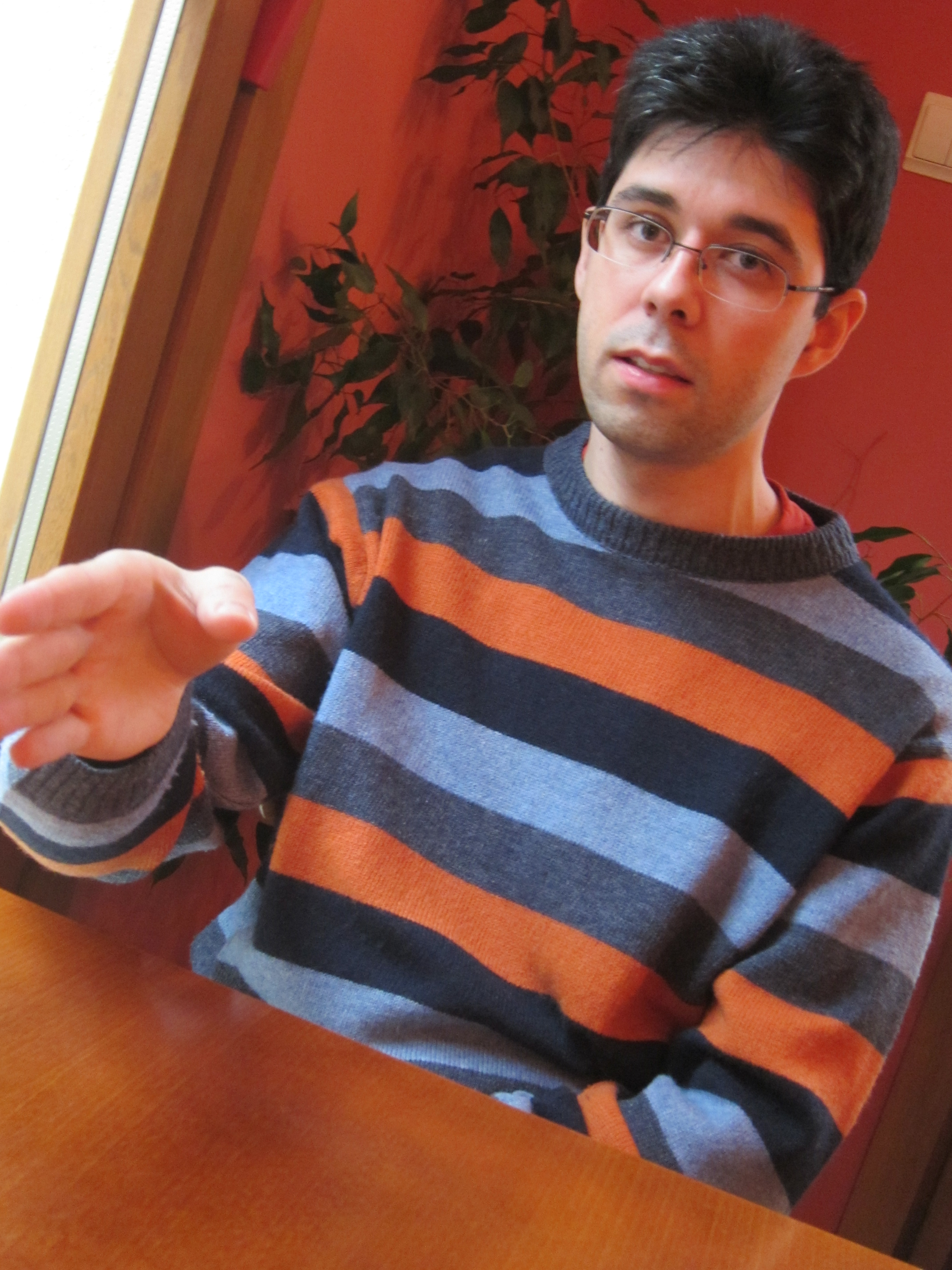
Penkov in 2011

Miroslav Penkov is a Bulgarian writer who writes in English and Bulgarian. He was born in Gabrovo, Bulgaria in 1982, lived in Sofia for fourteen years and in 2001, at the age of 18, moved to the United States of America. He studied for a bachelor's degree in psychology and a Master of Fine Arts in creative writing at the University of Arkansas. He is a professor of creative writing at the University of North Texas.

His stories have been translated in over twenty languages and have appeared in A Public Space, Granta, One Story, The Southern Review, The Sunday Times, The Best American Short Stories 2008 (edited by Salman Rushdie), The PEN/O. Henry Prize Stories 2012 and The Best American Nonrequired Reading 2013.

== Early life ==
When he was four years old, his family moved to Sofia, the capital city of Bulgaria. He spent fourteen years in Sofia, where he graduated from the First English Language High School.

== Awards and honors ==
In 2007, his short story "Buying Lenin" won The Southern Review's Eudora Welty Prize in Fiction. Later, Salman Rushdie included "Buying Lenin" in The Best American Short Stories 2008.

In 2012, his story "East of the West" won the BBC International Short Story Award. In the US, the story was anthologized in the PEN/O. Henry Prize Stories 2012 and The Best American Nonrequired Reading 2013.

In 2014, Penkov was selected as a protégé by mentor Michael Ondaatje as part of the Rolex Mentor and Protégé Arts Initiative, an international philanthropic program that pairs masters in their disciplines with emerging talents for a year of one-to-one creative exchange.

His debut story collection East of the West (Farrar, Straus and Giroux 2011) has been published in seventeen countries. It was a finalist for the 2012 William Saroyan International Prize for Writing and the Steven Turner Award for First Fiction by the Texas Institute of Letters. In 2016, FSG published his novel Stork Mountain, which appeared in Bulgaria under the title "Щъркелите и планината" (Ciela 2016).

Penkov's short story "A Picture with Yuki" was adapted into a feature film of the same title. A Bulgarian-Japanese production, the film was directed by Lachezar Avramov and starred Rushi Vidinliev, Kiki Sugino, Dimiter Marinov, and Bulgarian boxing legend Serafim Todorov.

== Works ==
- East of the West: A Country in Stories, Farrar, Straus and Giroux 2011 (US, first edition). ISBN 0374117330
- Stork Mountain: A Novel, Farrar, Straus and Giroux, 2016 (US, first edition). ISBN 9780374222796
