= Ross Raisin =

British novelist

- Born: Ross Radford Raisin; 1979 (age 46–47); Silsden, Yorkshire, England, UK
- Education: King's College London; Goldsmiths, University of London
- Writing career
- Notable works: God's Own Country, Waterline, A Natural
- Website: rossraisin.com

Ross Raisin FRSL (born 1979) is a British novelist and short story writer.

== Biography ==
Ross Raisin was born and brought up in Silsden, West Yorkshire. He attended Bradford Grammar School then King's College London, where he studied English. He then studied for the MA in Creative Writing at Goldsmiths College, while working as a trainee manager in a wine bar.

He is the author of four novels: A Hunger (2022), A Natural (2017), Waterline (2011) and God's Own Country (2008).

Raisin won the Sunday Times Young Writer of the Year award in 2009, and in 2013 was named on Granta's once-a-decade Best of Young British Novelists list, for writers under the age of 40.

He was elected a Fellow of the Royal Society of Literature in 2018.

His book for the Read This series, on the practice of fiction writing, Read This if you Want to be a Great Writer, was published by Laurence King Publishing in April 2018.

He has written short stories for Granta, Prospect, Esquire, Dazed and Confused, the Sunday Times, BBC Radio Three and Four, and for anthologies such as Best British Short Stories (Salt, 2013). He won the BBC National Short Story Award in 2024 for his story Ghost Kitchen.

He lives in London with his wife and two children.

== Awards and honours ==
- BBC National Short Story Award (2024)
- Royal Society of Literature Fellowship (2018)
- Society of Authors Scholarship (2017)
- Granta Best of Young British Novelists list, 2013
- International Dublin Literary Award, shortlist (2010)
- Sunday Times Young Writer of the Year Award, winner (2009)
- Authors' Club First Novel Award, shortlist (2009)
- Betty Trask Award winner (2008)
- Guardian First Book Award, shortlist (2008)
- Dylan Thomas Prize, shortlist (2008)
- Guildford Literary Festival First Novel Award, winner (2008)
- John Llwellyn Rhys Prize, shortlist (2008)
- Portico Prize for Literature, shortlist (2008)

== Publications ==
- God's Own Country, novel, 2008 (Viking, Penguin)
- Waterline, novel, 2011 (Viking, Penguin)
- A Natural, 2017 (Jonathan Cape, Random House)
- Read This if you Want to be a Great Writer, 2018 (part of the Read This series on the creative arts, Laurence King)
- A Hunger, 2022 (Jonathan Cape)

Raisin's debut novel God's Own Country (titled Out Backward in North America) was published in 2008. It was shortlisted for the Guardian First Book Award and the John Llewellyn Rhys Prize, and won a Betty Trask Award. The novel focuses on Sam Marsdyke, a disturbed adolescent living in a harsh rural environment, and follows his journey from isolated oddity to outright insanity. Thomas Meaney in The Washington Post compared the novel favourably to Anthony Burgess's A Clockwork Orange, and said "Out Backward more convincingly registers the internal logic of unredeemable delinquency". Writing in The Guardian Justine Jordan described the novel as "an absorbing read", which marked Raisin out as "a young writer to watch". In April 2009 the book won Raisin the Sunday Times Young Writer of the Year Award. He is currently a writer-in-residence for the charity First Story.
