= Jenny Wagner =

German physicist and cosmologist

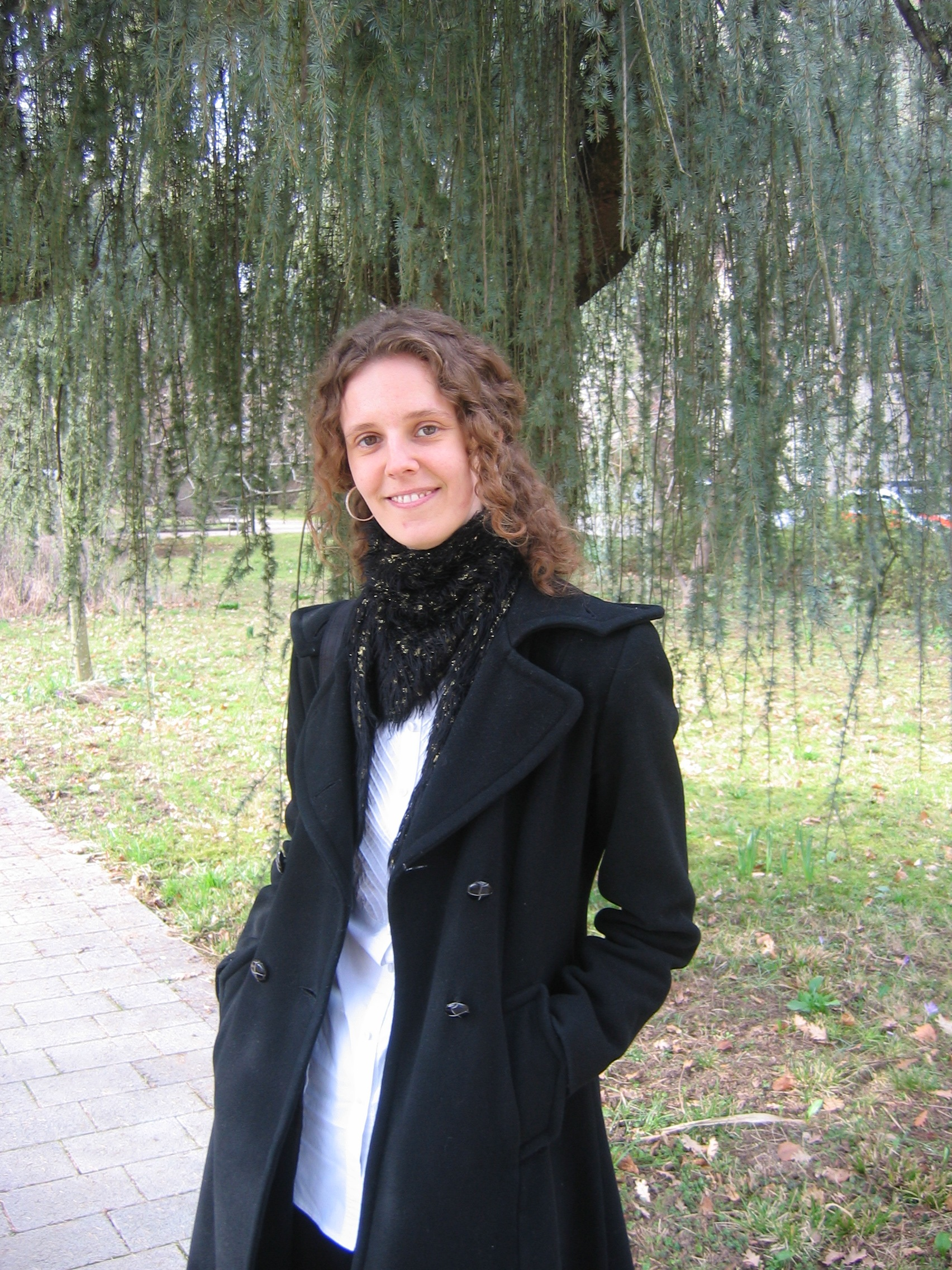
- Jenny Wagner, 2008
- Born: 1984 (age 41–42); Dudweiler, West Germany
- Education: Heidelberg University
- Known for: Observational cosmology, Strong gravitational lensing
- Awards: Preis für mutige Wissenschaft
- Scientific career
- Fields: Physics
- Workplaces: CERN, German Cancer Research Center, Heidelberg University, Bahamas Advanced Study Institute and Conferences (BASIC)
- Thesis: Quality control for peptide chip array production
- Doctoral advisor: Volker Lindenstruth

Jenny Wagner (born 1984) is a German physicist, cosmologist, and book author.

In her research, she aims at identifying the impact of models and more general assumptions on the interpretation of data within a given theoretical framework, and thereby follows the ideas of ideal observational cosmology, as pursued by George Ellis and collaborators. Her research in cosmology specialises in strong gravitational lensing, the description and evolution of cosmic structures, and the reconstruction of the cosmic distance ladder. Since 2019, she has been engaged in disseminating the concepts and results of astrophysical and cosmological research as part of the team of the German YouTube channel "Urknall, Weltall und das Leben" run by Joseph M. Gaßner.

In 2020, she was awarded the "Preis für mutige Wissenschaft" of the Baden-Württemberg Ministry of Science, Research and Art for proving to take high risks from the beginning of her the career onwards while working between different research fields – from her start in particle physics to her PhD in biophysics and to her work in cosmology.

Besides the mathematical and physical aspects of cosmology, she is interested in its philosophical foundations. She is also the editor of the 7th German edition of "Physics for Scientists and Engineers" originally written by Paul A. Tipler and Gene Mosca, and co-editor of the 8th German edition, published by Springer.

== Education ==
From 2003 to 2008, she studied physics, mathematics, and computer science at Heidelberg University, graduating with a Diplom in physics. Her thesis "Data compression for the ALICE detector at CERN" was written in the group led by Professor Volker Lindenstruth in Heidelberg and at CERN. From 2009 to 2011, she studied digital image processing, pattern recognition, and machine learning at the Heidelberg Collaboratory for Image Processing and wrote her PhD thesis in an interdisciplinary project between the Kirchhoff-Institute for Physics and the German Cancer Research Center on "Quality control for peptide chip array production" under the supervision of Volker Lindenstruth with Bernd Jähne and Michael Hausmann as thesis referees.

== Work ==
From 2014 to 2021 Jenny Wagner held two grants from the German Research Foundation to pursue her own research projects about strong gravitational lensing. Among others, the results included the mathematical derivation of the general class of invariance transformations in the strong gravitational lensing formalism that leave all observable data invariant. These derivations make it possible to separate the information that is directly contained in the data, i.e. the surface brightness profiles of extended multiple images, from the additional assumptions in terms of a specific mass density model for the gravitational lens that causes the observed light deflection. The approach thus yields an unprecedented understanding of the impact that different mass density profiles used as strong gravitational lens models have on the interpretation of the data. In particular, it explains the discrepancies found in the reconstruction of the total mass distribution in galaxies and galaxy clusters when different mass density profiles are used as lens models. Proof-of-principle was shown for the galaxy cluster CL0024+17 and the method was also applied to a triple-image configuration in the galaxy cluster J223013.1-080853.1 to infer properties of this strong gravitational lens that no model-based method could achieve due to the sparsity of available data.

In an interdisciplinary collaboration with condensed matter physicists, she also investigated whether Minkowski Tensors are better descriptors of surface brightness profiles for (gravitationally distorted) galaxy surface brightness profiles.

Jenny Wagner succeeded in transferring the same approach of separating data-based evidence from additional model assumptions to the reconstruction of the cosmic distance ladder with Type Ia supernovae, such that the cosmic expansion function can be reconstructed by standardisable objects without the need to make any assumption about the value of the Hubble constant. As the strong gravitational lensing formalism requires cosmic distances to the lens and the background source to be known, the data-based reconstruction of the cosmic distance ladder as set up by this approach also contributes to free the interpretation of strong gravitational lensing phenomena from assuming a specific cosmological model in the class of homogeneous and isotropic cosmologies.

As the total mass distribution in strong gravitational lenses can usually only be constrained by sparse observational data, lens models still play a major role in the mass reconstructions. To overcome the problem that most mass density models used as strong gravitational lens models are inferred as heuristic fitting functions to cosmic structure simulations, Jenny Wagner derived the class of (broken) power law mass density profiles, like the famous Navarro-Frenk-White profile, from fundamental principles. Her approach does not rely on conventional statistical mechanics. This can be considered an advantage over standard derivations because the ergodic hypothesis is violated for gravity and its scale-freeness impedes a natural way to set up and coarse grain a phase space to establish an entropy.

The approach is deemed a promising step towards a deeper understanding of structures formed by gravitational interaction as it received an honourable mention in the Gravity Research Foundation Essay Contest 2020.

Most recently, she put forward the idea that the tension in the Hubble constant can be cast as a fitting problem in cosmology. Then, the tension is resolved by acknowledging that the independence of the probes at early and late cosmic times can cause a lack of synchronisation between the fitted cosmological models. At early cosmic times, the all-sky observables are easy to be fitted to a homogeneous and isotropic background cosmology and perturbations on top. Contrary to that, it is hard to partition the local observables in the late universe into a contribution from the background cosmology and one for the perturbation level effects. Furthermore, she argues that the data are not equally sensitive to all parameters of the cosmological concordance model in the two fitting processes. Taking the lack of synchronisation and the varying sensitivity of the data to the cosmological model together, observational evidence can be found to support this explanation of the Hubble tension.

== Popular Science ==
As part of the German YouTube channel, Jenny Wagner has recorded several video talks about her research results and current issues in cosmology like possible violations of the cosmological principle.

Together with Stephen Appleby, Eoin Ó Colgáin, and Shahin Sheikh-Jabbari, she also established a web blog called "Cosmo of '69 -- observational cosmology out of the FLRW box" to disseminate and promote observational evidence questioning the validity of the current concordance cosmological model and alternatives to this established standard.

== Publications (selected) ==
- Lossless Data Compression for ALICE HLT (part of her diploma work)
- Image Processing Quality Analysis for Particle Based Peptide Array Production on a Microchip (summary paper of her PhD thesis)
- A Model-Independent Characterisation of Strong Gravitational Lensing by Observables (summary of her work on strong gravitational lensing until 2019)
- Cosmic structures from a mathematical perspective 1: dark matter halo mass density profiles (paper to explain power-law mass density profiles of cosmic structures)
- Self-gravitating dark matter gets in shape (honourably mentioned Gravity Research Foundation essay)
- Casting the H0 tension as a fitting problem of cosmologies (her paper explaining the H0 tension)
- Is the Observable Universe Consistent with the Cosmological Principle? (summary paper of her community on observations questioning the validity of the cosmological principle)

== See also ==
- Dark matter
- Observable universe
- Epistemology
- Philosophical razor
- Dennis W. Sciama
