= Ravan Press =

South African anti-apartheid publishing company

Ravan Press, established in 1972 by Peter Ralph Randall, Danie van Zyl, and Beyers Naudé, was a South African anti-apartheid publishing house.

Ravan Press was initially established to print the reports of the South African Study Project of Christianity in Apartheid Society (Spro-Cas). In 1974 it became a donor-funded oppositional publishing house, specializing in anti-apartheid literature.

In 1984, following its release of Njabulo Ndebele's novel Fools and Other Stories (Staffrider Series, No. 19), Ravan Press won the Noma Award for Publishing in Africa.

In the 1990s Ravan Press was taken over by Pan MacMillan.

== Book series published by Ravan Press ==
- Battles of the Anglo-Boers
- New History of Southern Africa Series
- Ravan Local History
- Ravan Playscripts
- Ravan Writers Series
- Staffrider Series
- Topic Series
