= BBC National Short Story Award =

British literary award

- Awarded for: Best short story by a UK national or resident
- Sponsored by: BBC Radio 4 with Cambridge University
- Country: United Kingdom
- Presented by: BBC (formerly National Endowment for Science, Technology and the Arts)
- Formerly called: National Short Story Award (2006–2007)
- First award: 2006
- Currently held by: Ghost Kitchen, Ross Raisin (2024)
- Website: BBC National Short Story Award

Television/radio coverage
- Network: BBC Radio 4

The BBC National Short Story Award (known as the National Short Story Award in 2006 and 2007) has been described as "one of the most prestigious [awards] for a single short story" and the richest prize in the world for a single short story. It is an annual short story contest in the United Kingdom which is open to UK residents and nationals. As of 2017, the winner receives £15,000 and four shortlisted writers receive £600 each.

== Award and history ==
The BBC National Short Story Award is an annual short story contest in the United Kingdom which is open to UK residents and nationals. It aims to increase interest in the short story genre, particularly British short stories. As of 2017, the winner receives £15,000 and four shortlisted writers receive £600 each. The award has been described as "one of the most prestigious [awards] for a single short story" and the richest prize in the world for a single short story. However, between 2010 and 2021, the Sunday Times EFG Private Bank Short Story Award was greater, at £30,000.

It was founded in 2005 and announced at the Edinburgh International Book Festival the same year. The National Endowment for Science, Technology and the Arts (NESTA) were the main sponsor, with support from BBC Radio 4 and Prospect magazine. Originally, winners received £15,000 while runners up received £3,000 and shortlisted writers £500 each. In 2008, the BBC became the main sponsor and the award was renamed from the "National Short Story Award" to the "BBC National Short Story Award".

To mark the tenth anniversary, in 2015, the BBC Young Writers' Award was launched, challenging 14-18-year-olds to write a story of up to 1,000 words. The winner of the Young Writers' Award is announced alongside the National Short Story Award winner.

== Winners and shortlisted writers ==
In 2009, only women were featured on the shortlist. This happened for the second time in 2013 and the fifth time in 2018. In 2018, prize judge Di Speirs noted that the BBC National Short Story Award has never had an all-male shortlist. Short stories written by women typically account for between 50 and 70 percent of all submissions.

At 26 years of age, Canadian writer D. W. Wilson became the youngest ever recipient of the award in 2011. In 2020, Sarah Hall, who won the award in 2013 and 2020, became the first writer to have won the award twice. In 2012, in honour of the 2012 Summer Olympics hosted in London, the competition was open to a global audience for one year only. Ten stories were shortlisted, instead of five, and Bulgarian writer Miroslav Penkov won.

== Sponsorship ==
Since 2021 the BBC National Short Story Award has been delivered in partnership with a consortium of colleges and other departments at the University of Cambridge, comprising: the School of Arts and Humanities; Faculties of English and Education; University Library; Fitzwilliam Museum; the University of Cambridge Centre for Creative Writing, part of the University of Cambridge's Institute of Continuing Education; Robinson College; and Downing College. The partnership is led by Dr Bonnie Lander Johnson and Dr Elizabeth Rawlinson-Mills.

Previous sponsors and partners of the Award are First Story, BookTrust, NESTA, and Prospect magazine.

== Controversies ==
In 2007, BBC Radio 4 chose not to broadcast the short story "Weddings and Beheadings" by Hanif Kureishi after a militant group claimed to have executed the BBC Gaza correspondent Alan Johnston. Kureishi argued that this was an act of censorship by the BBC.
