= Max Solling =

Australian urban and sports historian

Max Charles Solling (OAM; b. 1942) is an Australian urban and sports historian.

== Biography ==
Max Solling was born the second child and only son of Jessie (née Webb) (1917–2017) and Rex Erie Solling (1909–1980). His father was an accountant, and then later a bank manager, with the Commercial Banking Company of Sydney from 1926 until retirement in 1972. Solling's early life was spent in Bathurst and Albury in New South Wales. For his senior education Solling was educated at Newington College (1955–1959) and then at the University of Sydney where he was awarded a University Sporting Blue in boxing and was Australian Universities boxing champion. In 1972 he completed his MA on the development of nineteenth-century Glebe and he was a founding editor of the Leichhardt Historical Journal. He is also a qualified and practicing solicitor. Solling has been a resident of Glebe since 1960.

== Publications ==
- Town and Country: A History of the Manning Valley (2014), Halstead Press, ISBN 9781920831561
- An Act of Bastardry: Rugby league axes its first club: Glebe District Rugby League Football Club 1908 to 1929 (2014), Walla Walla Press, ISBN 9781876718206
- Grandeur and Grit: A History of Glebe (2007), Halstead Press, ISBN 1-920831-38-X
- The Boatshed on Blackwattle Bay (1993), Glebe Rowing Club, ISBN 0-646-14811-7
- Leichhardt: On the Margins of the City (1997) with Peter Reynolds, Allen & Unwin, ISBN 186448408X (A social history of Leichhardt and the former municipalities of Annandale, Balmain and Glebe.
- Contributor, Oxford Companion to Australian Sport
- Contributor, Oxford Companion to Australian Cricket

== Awards ==
- Australian Sports Medal as a local sporting historian (2000)
- Medal of the Order of Australia for service to the community, particularly through researching, recording and publishing the history of Glebe (2005)
