= Grafton saxophone =

Plastic alto saxophone

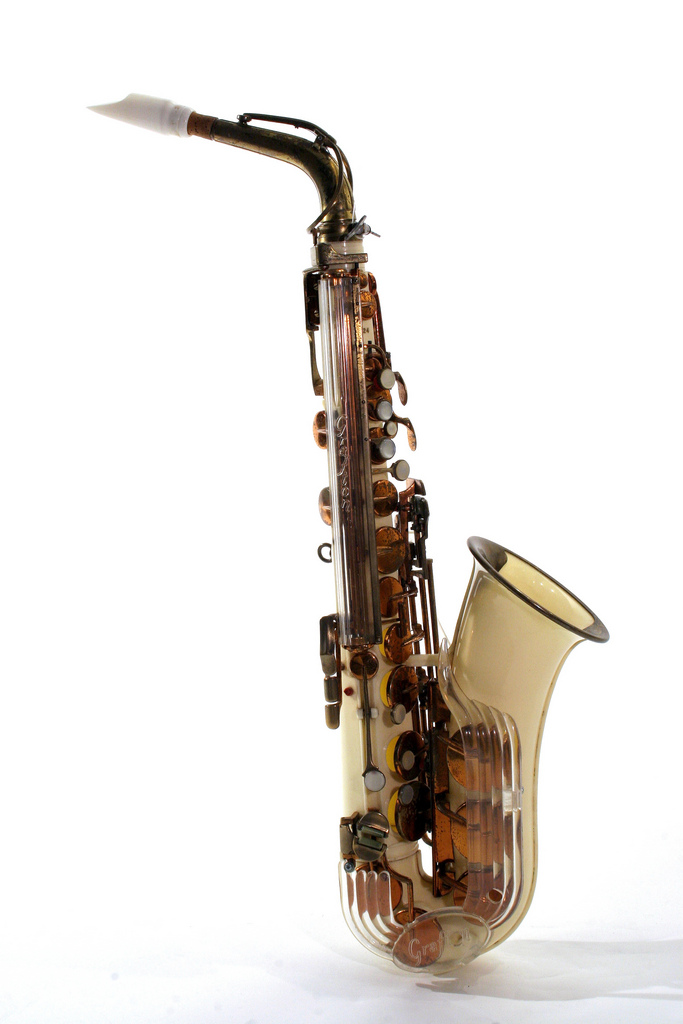
Grafton alto saxophone

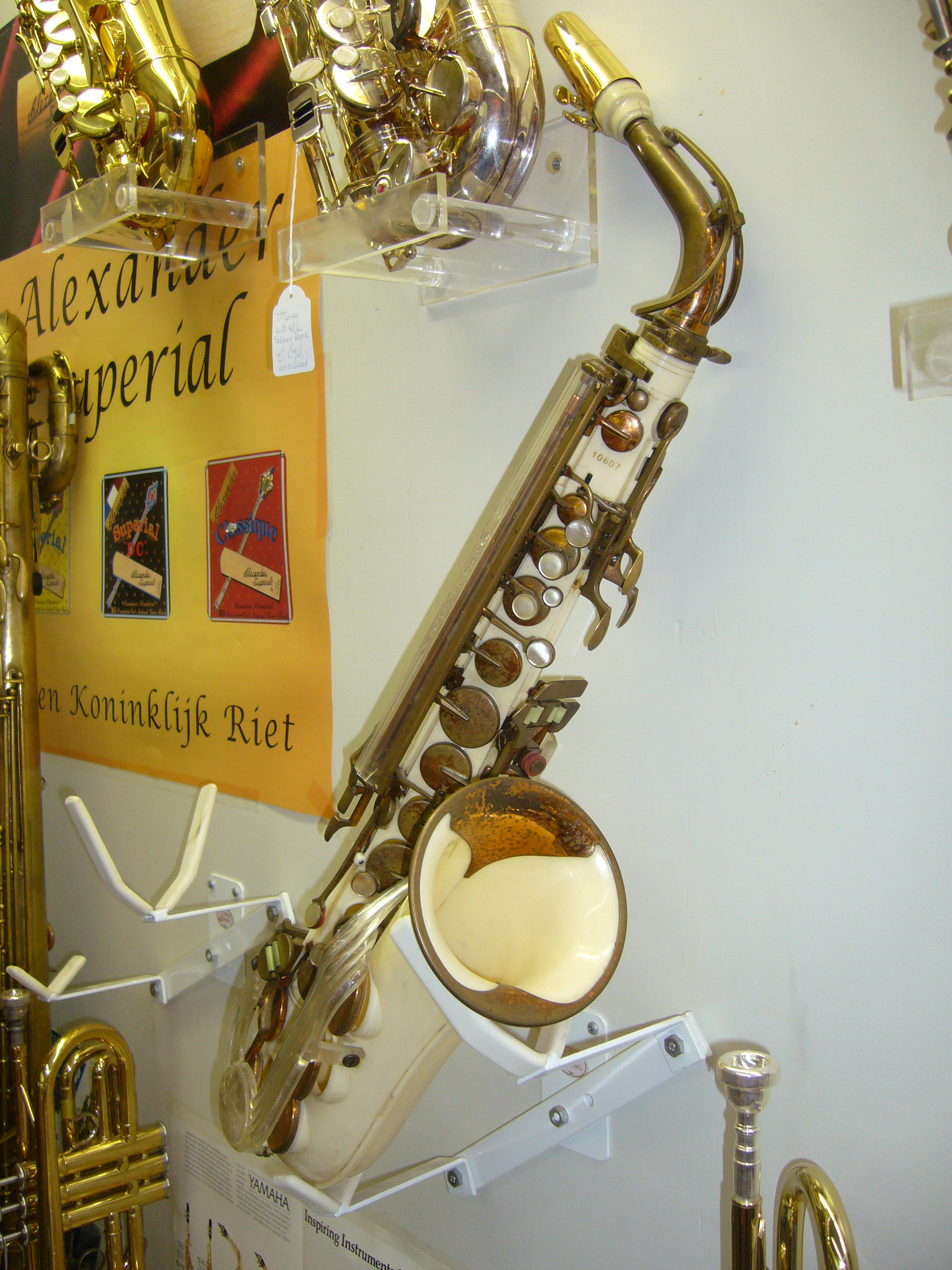
Frontal view

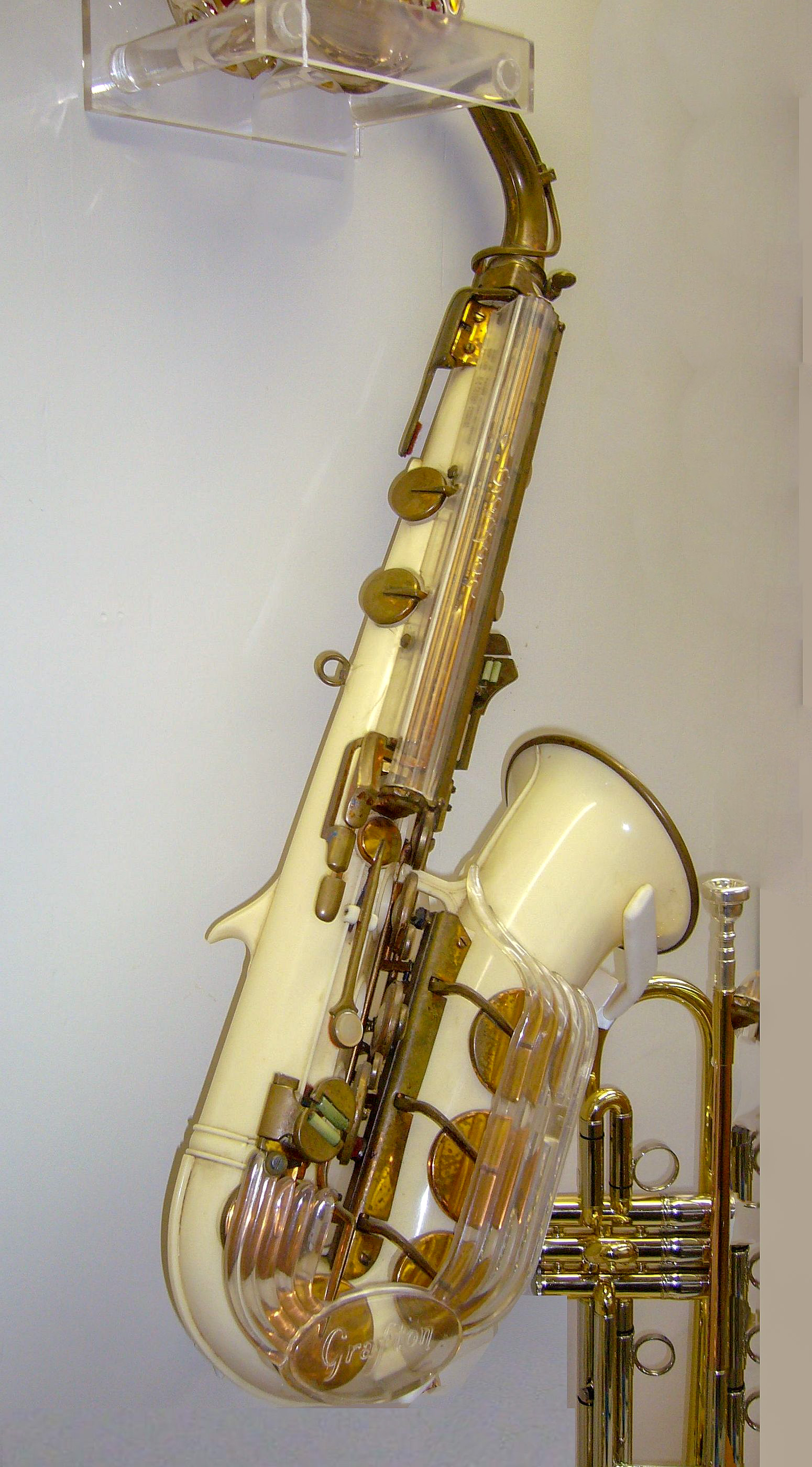
Side view

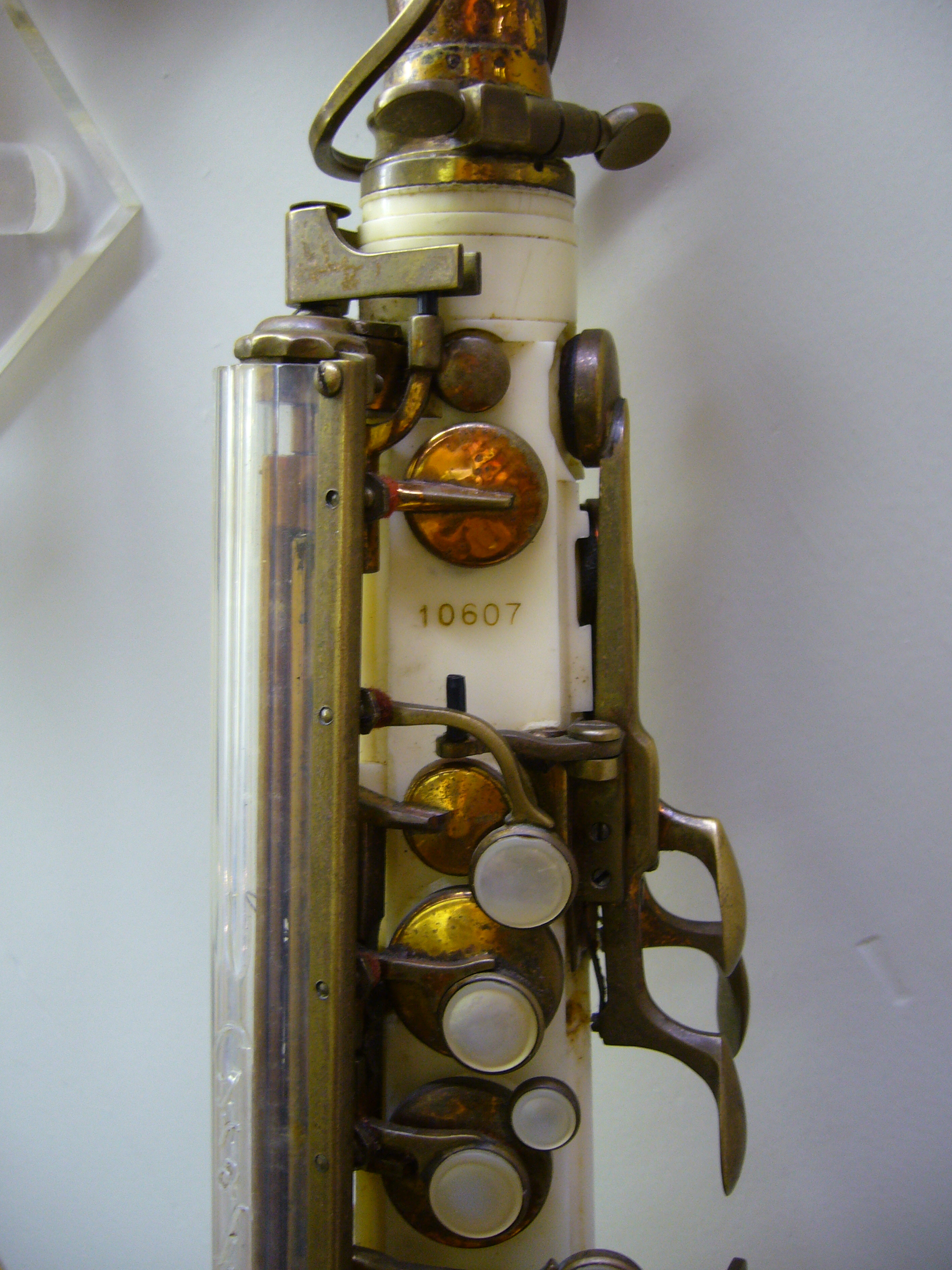
Serial number above the front F key

The Grafton saxophone was an injection moulded, cream-coloured acrylic plastic alto saxophone with metal keys, manufactured in London, England by the Grafton company, and later by 'John E. Dallas & Sons Ltd'. Grafton made only altos, owing to the manufacturing challenges presented by larger models (e.g., the tenor) with 1950s plastic technologies. Production commenced in 1950 and ended after approximately ten years. However, a few last examples were assembled from residual parts circa 1967. All tools, machinery, and jigs required to manufacture the Grafton were sold for scrap and subsequently destroyed in 1968.

== Design ==
Designed by Ettore Sommaruga, an Italian living in London, the saxophone was named after "Grafton Way", his address during the early 1950s and so on. The basic saxophone design was patented in late 1945. Creation of the first non-working prototype took place in 1946, and commercial production commenced in 1950. The selling price of the Grafton was £55 i.e. approximately half the cost of a conventional brass saxophone at that time. Contemporary marketing literature described the Grafton as a "Tone poem in ivory and gold". The decision to make it mainly from acrylic glass like perspex was motivated simply because of its much lower cost and ease of production, rather than improvement in tonal qualities. The serial number on a Grafton appears in an unusual location: it is stamped onto the main body of the saxophone (and highlighted in black) at the front, approximately 2 cm above the front F key which is operated by the player's left hand. Serial numbers run to a maximum of five digits. Serial numbers running up to at least 13,571 are known to exist.

== Inadequacies ==
The Grafton saxophone, in spite of the fame gained from its use by Charlie Parker and Ornette Coleman, failed to gain acceptance among professional saxophone players due to a variety of reasons.

The acrylic plastic used for the body is brittle, resulting in an extremely fragile instrument. Any component parts made of plastic can easily crack, fracture or snap off during normal use. Not only do Graftons use a non-standard spring mechanism to operate the action, but spare parts are unavailable. Not surprisingly, Graftons are challenging and expensive to overhaul or repair when compared to saxophones made entirely of metal.

The mechanical action of Graftons has an unusual "spongy" feel to it, without the quick, "snappy", positive feel of other more conventional saxophone actions, which was disconcerting to players.

The plastic body and bell of the Grafton creates a sound very similar to a conventional brass saxophone, as the sound of a saxophone is created by the player, mouthpiece and cone of air, the body material having no influence on tone. The Grafton was used for artistic effect by Ornette Coleman on his album, The Shape of Jazz to Come.

For these reasons, and their comparative rarity, it is unusual to see a Grafton being played by performers in the 21st century. As a general rule, Graftons are now regarded purely as collector's items i.e. for display purposes only. This is because they are fragile and very easy to damage, which detracts from their monetary value.

== Notable players ==
=== Charlie Parker ===
The most notable player of a Grafton saxophone was Charlie Parker. While in Toronto, Charlie Parker and "the quintet" were scheduled to perform at Massey Hall, but Parker had pawned his saxophone - some sources say to buy heroin. A sales representative for Grafton (or the owner of the company, depending on the source) asked Parker to use a Grafton for a Massey Hall gig in May 1953. Although Parker was under exclusive contract to use only one type of saxophone while gigging in the United States, outside the U.S. he was free to use any sax he wished. Parker (credited as Charlie Chan due to contract issues) can be heard playing this Grafton on the album Jazz at Massey Hall with Bud Powell, Dizzy Gillespie, Charles Mingus and Max Roach, albeit through a low fidelity recording. The Grafton saxophone that Parker used (serial number 10265) was sold at the Christie's auction house in London in September 1994 for £93,500 sterling. The buyer was the American Jazz Museum, located in Parker's home town of Kansas City, Missouri.

=== Ornette Coleman ===
Ornette Coleman used to play a Grafton (that he purchased in 1954) originally because it was the cheapest saxophone he could replace his first tenor with after it was broken. In the late fifties and early sixties, Coleman was sometimes known as "the man with the plastic horn". However, Coleman subsequently replaced his Grafton with a white-lacquered Selmer alto instead.

=== John Dankworth ===
English jazz composer, saxophonist and clarinetist John Dankworth was an early endorser. The Grafton company provided him with two altos, specially customised to his requirements. During the Festival of Britain in 1951, the "John Dankworth Seven" (with Dankworth playing a Grafton) performed at the newly opened Royal Festival Hall in London.

=== Ade Monsbourgh ===
Australian Ade Monsbourgh was given an acrylic alto saxophone by the Grafton Saxophone Company UK, during the Bell Second Tour c. 1951–1952. The multi-instrumentalist is perhaps best known for his work with Graeme Bell's band with which he twice toured Europe and England in the 1940s. These tours had a significant impact, as did Monsbourgh's own playing. Indeed, he was offered a job in the band of English jazz musician Humphrey Lyttelton but turned it down. Back in Australia, he played in Len Barnard's band, became a resident guest musician at the Melbourne Jazz Club and later played and recorded with Neville Stribling in Lazy Ade's Late Hour Boys and Adelaide composer Dave Dallwitz. Writing in The Oxford Companion to Australian Jazz, Bruce Johnson said that Monsbourgh, also known as "The Father" or "Lazy Ade", was "one of the most original and influential jazz musicians Australia has produced". "His distinctive approach, both in terms of timing, harmonic line and, especially on alto, his timbre, is central to what is widely, if controversially regarded as the 'Australian' or 'Melbourne' jazz style." Johnson also said that Monsbourgh has been copied "more productively than any other Australian jazz musician, including by overseas musicians". In 2003, Monsbourgh won the Graeme Bell Career Achievement Award at the inaugural Australian Jazz Awards.

=== David Bowie ===
David Bowie asked his father to lend him money to buy himself a saxophone. His father bought him the saxophone but made David agree to pay him back with the money he made from his part-time job. He can be heard discussing this in a BBC interview.

=== Florian Trübsbach ===
Since 2011 Florian Trübsbach, Professor at the University for Music and Performing Arts Munich, has played a Grafton alto exclusively.

== Legacy ==
The Grafton saxophone remains a historical curiosity and a footnote to the careers of Charlie Parker and Ornette Coleman among jazz buffs. The Vibratosax represents another attempt to produce a low cost saxophone made of plastic. However, it remains to be seen whether that venture has solved the mechanical and durability issues that plagued the Grafton. Whether or not the various issues surrounding plastic saxophones can be solved with more modern plastics or composites to the satisfaction of players and repair technicians remains a matter of speculation.
