= Archon =

Greek term for a ruler

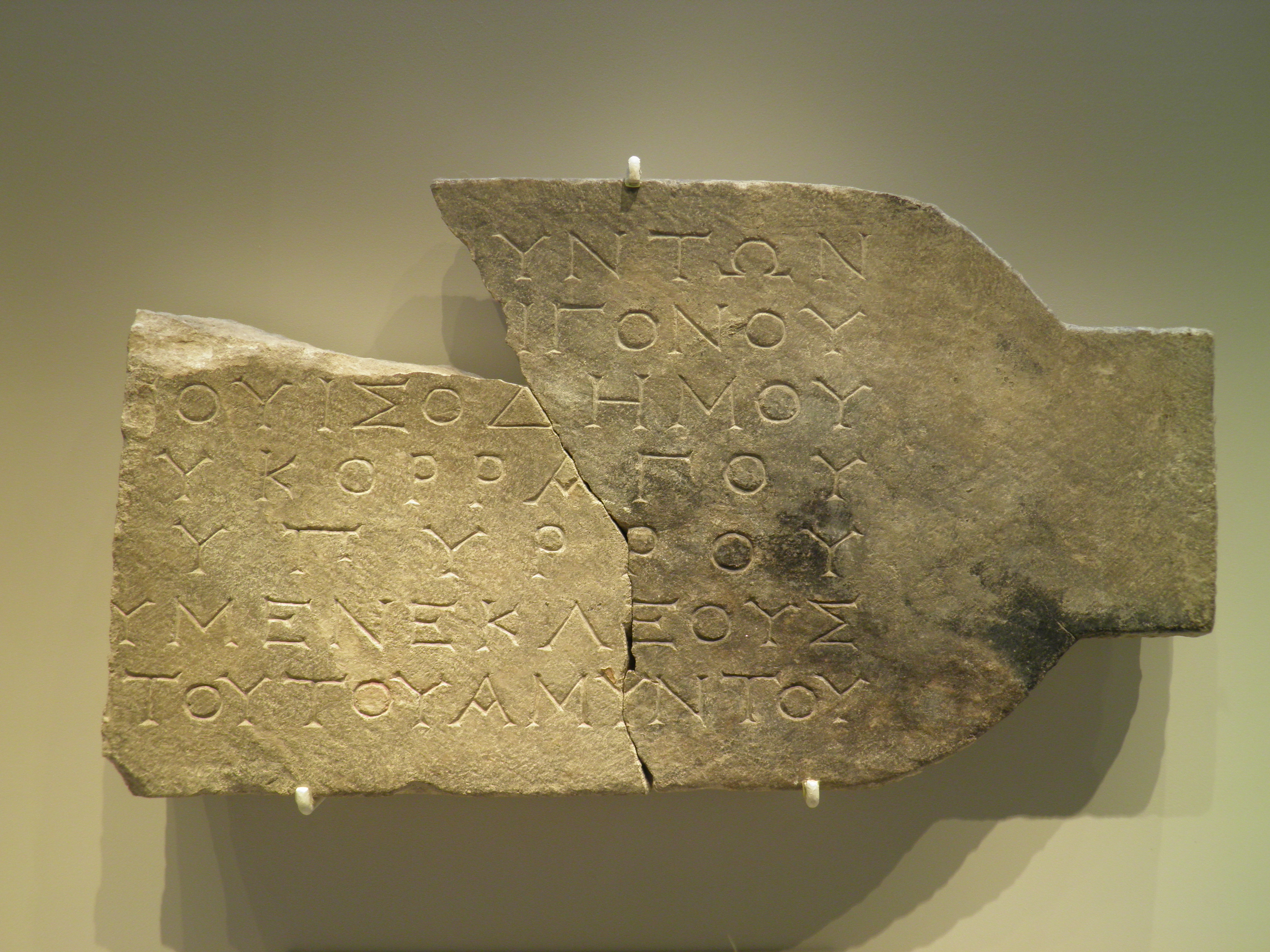
Fragmentary inscription bearing the names of six city archons (politarchs), 2nd century BC, Archaeological Museum of Pella

Archon (Greek: ἄρχων, romanized: árchōn, plural: ἄρχοντες, árchontes) is a Greek word that means "ruler", frequently used as the title of a specific public office. It is the masculine present participle of the verb stem αρχ-, meaning "to be first, to rule" (see also ἀρχή "beginning, origin"), derived from the same root as words such as monarch and hierarchy.

== Ancient Greece ==
In the early literary period of ancient Greece, the chief magistrates of various Greek city states were called archontes. The term was also used throughout Greek history in a more general sense, ranging from "club leader" to "master of the tables" at syssitia to "Roman governor".

In Athens, a system of three concurrent archons evolved, the three office holders being known as archon eponymos (ἄρχων ἐπώνυμος), the polemarch (πολέμαρχος), and the archon basileus (ἄρχων βασιλεύς). According to Aristotle's Constitution of the Athenians, the power of the king first devolved to the archons, and these offices were filled from the aristocracy by elections every ten years. During this period, the archon eponymos was the chief magistrate, the polemarch was the head of the armed forces, and the archon basileus was responsible for the civic religious arrangements. After 683 BC, the offices were held for only a single year, and the year was named after the archon eponymos. (Many ancient calendar systems did not number their years consecutively.) Although the process of the next transition is unclear, after 487 BC the archonships were assigned by lot to any citizen and the polemarch's military duties were taken over by a new class of generals known as strategoi. The polemarch thereafter had only minor religious duties. The archon eponymos remained the titular head of state under democracy, though of much reduced political importance. The archons were assisted by "junior archons", called thesmothetai (pl. of thesmothetēs). After 487 BC, ex-archons were automatically enrolled as life members of the Areopagus, though that assembly was no longer extremely important politically at that time.

Under the Athenian constitution, archons were also in charge of organizing festivals by bringing together poets, playwrights, actors, and city-appointed choregoi (wealthy citizen patrons). The archon would begin this process months in advance of a festival by selecting a chorus of three playwrights based on descriptions of the projected plays. Each playwright would be assigned a choregos, also selected by the archon, from among the wealthy citizens who would pay all the expenses of costumes, masks, and training the chorus. The archon also assigned each playwright a principal actor (the protagonist), as well as a second and third actor. The City Dionysia, an ancient dramatic festival held in March in which tragedy, comedy, and satyric drama originated, was under the direction of one of the principal magistrates, the archon eponymos.

== Byzantine Empire ==
Byzantine historians usually described foreign rulers as archontes. The rulers of the Bulgars themselves, along with their own titles, often bear the title archon placed by God in inscriptions in Greek.

Inside Byzantium, the term could be used to refer to any powerful noble or magnate, but in a technical sense, it was applied to a class of provincial governors. In the 8th and 9th centuries, these were the governors of some of the more peripheral provinces, inferior in status to the themata: Dalmatia, Cephalonia, Crete and Cyprus. Archontes were also placed in charge of various naval bases and trade stations, as well as semi-autonomous Slavic-inhabited areas (sclaviniae) under Byzantine sovereignty. In the 10th–12th centuries, archontes are also mentioned as the governors of specific cities. The area of an archon's jurisdiction was called an archontia (ἀρχοντία). The title was also used for the holders of several financial posts, such as the head of the mint (ἄρχων τῆς χαραγῆς), as well as directors of the imperial workshops, arsenals, etc.

The title of megas archon ("grand archon") is also attested, as a translation of foreign titles such as "grand prince". In the mid-13th century, it was established as a special court rank, held by the highest-ranking official of the emperor's company. It existed throughout the Palaiologan period, but did not have any specific functions.

== Ottoman Empire ==
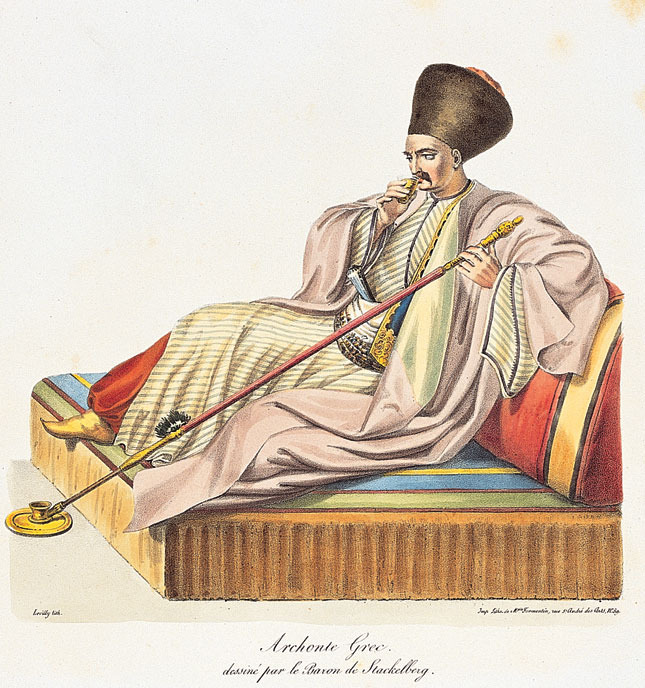
A Greek archon in Ottoman dress, 1828

During the centuries of Ottoman rule in Greece, archons remained a part of urban administration. In Athens during this period, there were four archons appointed every two years by the citizens to serve in the city government as representatives of the Greeks. These archons served alongside the Cadi (Islamic judge) in the court of the Voivode. The archons of Ottoman Athens were chosen from the most powerful and wealthy families in the city.

== Archons of the Ecumenical Patriarchate of Constantinople ==
From time to time, laity of the Orthodox Church in communion with the Patriarch of Constantinople have been granted the title of archon to honor their service to Church administration. In 1963, archons in the United States were organized into a service society, the Order of St. Andrew. This archon status is not part of the Church hierarchy and is purely honorary.

An archon is an honoree by His All Holiness the Ecumenical Patriarch, for his outstanding service to the Church, and a well-known, distinguished, and well-respected leader of the Orthodox Church (at large).

It is the sworn oath of the archon to defend and promote the Orthodox Church faith and tradition. His main concern is to protect and promote the Holy Patriarchate and its mission. He is also concerned with human rights and the well-being and general welfare of the Church.

As it is a significant religious position, the faith and dedication of a candidate for the role are extensively reviewed during consideration; the candidate should have demonstrated commitment for the betterment of the Church, Parish-Diocese, Archdiocese and the community as a whole.

== Other uses ==
"Archon" is used in Modern Greek colloquially, as άρχοντας (archontas), for someone that holds a form of status or power, and the Arabic-speaking Copts use it in church parlance in the form أرخن ʼurḫun as a title for a leading member of the laity. Archon was the title of Great Officers of Sicily. It can also be used as a title in fraternities and sororities.

In Gnostic religious traditions, the term archon generally refers to a group of seven supernatural beings, associated with the seven classical planets and considered to be responsible for the creation of the physical world.

== See also ==
- Exousiastes

== Sources ==
- A Greek-English Lexicon (aka Liddell and Scott), ISBN 0-19-864226-1
- The Oxford Companion to Classical Literature, ISBN 0-19-866121-5.
- Archons of the Ecumenical Patriarchate
- Mitchell, John Malcolm (1911). "Archon" . In Chisholm, Hugh (ed.). Encyclopædia Britannica. Vol. 2 (11th ed.). Cambridge University Press. pp. 444–445. This contains a detailed account of the evolution of the Greek office, and the qualifications required. Authorities cited:
  - G. Gilbert, Constitutional Antiquities (Eng. trans., 1895)
  - Eduard Meyer's Geschichte des Alterthums, ii. sect. 228
  - A. H. J. Greenidge, Handbook of Greek Constitutional History (1895)
  - J. W. Headlam, On Election by Lot in Athens (Camb., 1891)
