= Oxford Companions =

Nonfiction book series

Oxford Companions is a book series published by Oxford University Press, providing general knowledge within a specific area. The first book published in the series was The Oxford Companion to English Literature (1932), compiled by the retired diplomat Sir Paul Harvey.

The series has included (in alphabetical order):

Title	Subject
The Oxford Companion to Aboriginal Art and Culture	Aboriginal art and culture
The Oxford Companion to African American Literature	African American literature
The Oxford Companion to American Food and Drink	American food and drink
The Oxford Companion to American History	American history
The Oxford Companion to American Law	American law
The Oxford Companion to American Literature	American literature
The Oxford Companion to American Military History	American military history
The Oxford Companion to the American Musical: Theatre, Film, and Television	American musicals
The Oxford Companion to American Theatre	American theatre
The Oxford Companion to Animal Behaviour	Animal behaviour
The Oxford Companion to Archaeology	Archaeology
The Oxford Companion to Art	Art
The Oxford Companion to Australian Children's Literature	Australian children's literature
The Oxford Companion to Australian Folklore	Australian folklore
Oxford Companion to Australian Gardens	Australian gardens
The Oxford Companion to Australian History	Australian history
The Oxford Companion to Australian Jazz	Australian jazz
The Oxford Companion to Australian Literature	Australian literature
The Oxford Companion to Australian Military History	Australian military history
Oxford Companion to Australian Politics	Australian politics
The Oxford Companion to Australian Sport	Australian sport
The Oxford Companion to the Book	Books
The Oxford Companion to Beer	Beer
The Oxford Companion to the Bible	The Bible
The Oxford Companion to Black British History	Black British history
The Oxford Companion to the Body	The human body
The Oxford Companion to British History	British history
The Oxford Companion to the Brontës	The Brontës
The Oxford Companion to Canadian History and Literature	Canadian history and literature
The Oxford Companion to Canadian Literature	Canadian literature
The Oxford Companion to Chaucer	Chaucer
The Oxford Companion to Chess	Chess
The Oxford Companion to Children's Literature	Children's literature
The Oxford Companion to Christian Art and Architecture	Christian art and architecture
The Oxford Companion to Christian Thought	Christian thought
The Oxford Companion to Classical Civilization	Classical civilization
The Oxford Companion to Classical Literature	Classical literature
The Oxford Companion to Cosmology	Cosmology
The Oxford Companion to Crime and Mystery Writing	Crime and mystery writing
The Oxford Companion to the Decorative Arts	The decorative arts
The Oxford Companion to the Earth	Earth
The Oxford Companion to Edwardian Fiction	Edwardian fiction
The Oxford Companion to the English Language	The English language
The Oxford Companion to English Literature	English literature
The Oxford Companion to Fairy Tales	Fairy tales
The Oxford Companion to Film	Film
The Oxford Companion to Food	Food
The New Oxford Companion to Literature in French	French literature
The Oxford Companion to French Literature	French literature
The Oxford Companion to the Garden	Gardens
The Oxford Companion to Gardens	Gardens
The Oxford Companion to German Literature	German literature
The Oxford Companion to Global Change	Global change
The Oxford Companion to the High Court of Australia	The High Court of Australia
The Oxford Companion to the History of Modern Science	The history of modern science
The Oxford Companion to Indian Archaeology: The Archaeological Foundations of Ancient India	Indian archaeology
The Oxford Companion to Indian Theatre	Indian theatre
The Oxford Companion to International Criminal Justice	International criminal justice
The Oxford Companion to Irish History	Irish history
The Oxford Companion to Irish Literature	Irish literature
The Oxford Companion to Italian Food	Italian food
The Oxford Companion to Italian Literature	Italian literature
The Oxford Companion to J. M. W. Turner	J. M. W. Turner
The Oxford Companion to Jazz	Jazz
The New Oxford Companion to Law	Law
The Oxford Companion to Law	Law
The Oxford Companion to the Literature of Wales	The literature of Wales
The Oxford Companion to Local and Family History	Local and family history
The Oxford Companion to Mark Twain	Mark Twain
The Oxford Companion to Medicine	Medicine
The Oxford Illustrated Companion to Medicine	Medicine
The Oxford Medical Companion	Medicine
The Oxford Companion to Military History	Military history
The Oxford Companion to the Mind	The mind
The New Oxford Companion to Music	Music
The Oxford Companion to Music	Music
The Oxford Companion to Musical Instruments	Musical instruments
The Oxford Companion to New Zealand Literature	New Zealand literature
The Oxford Names Companion	Names
The Oxford Companion to Philosophy	Philosophy
The Oxford Companion to the Photograph	Photography
The Oxford Companion to Politics in India	Politics of India
The Oxford Companion to Politics of the World	Politics of the world
The Oxford Companion to Popular Music	Popular music
An Oxford Companion to the Romantic Age: British Culture, 1776-1832	The Romantic Age
The Oxford Companion to Scottish History	Scottish history
The Oxford Companion to the Second World War	World War II
The Oxford Companion to Shakespeare	Shakespeare
The Oxford Companion to Ships and the Sea	Ships and the sea
The Oxford India Guide Companion to Sociology and Social Anthropology	Sociology and social anthropology
The Oxford Companion to Spanish Literature	Spanish literature
The Oxford Companion to Spirits and Cocktails	Distilled spirits beverages
The Oxford Companion to Sugar and Sweets	Sugar, confectionery and dessert
The Oxford Companion to the Supreme Court of the United States	The Supreme Court of the United States
The Oxford Companion to Twentieth-Century Art	Twentieth-century art
The Oxford Companion to Twentieth-Century British Politics	Twentieth-century British politics
The Oxford Companion to Twentieth-Century Literature in English	Twentieth-century literature in English
The Oxford Companion to Twentieth-Century Poetry in English	Twentieth-century poetry in English
The Oxford Companion to United States History	United States history
The Oxford Companion to Wine	Wine
The Oxford Companion to Women's Writing in the United States	Women's writing in the United States
The Oxford Companion to World Exploration	World exploration
The Oxford Companion to World Mythology	World mythology
The Oxford Companion to World Sports and Games	World sports and games
The Oxford Companion to the Year: An Exploration of Calendar Customs and Time-reckoning	Calendar customs and time-reckoning
