= The Oxford Companion to Australian Folklore =

Book about Australian folklore

The Oxford Companion to Australian Folklore (ISBN 0195530578) is a book in the series of Oxford Companions published by Oxford University Press, its first edition dated 1993. It contains an alphabetically arranged set of articles on Australian subjects: notable persons and topics of general interest, ranging in length from 100 to 2,000 words. It has around 380 pages and is bound uniformly with The Oxford Companion to English Literature but with a slightly smaller page size than The Oxford Companion to Australian Literature and others in the series.

It was edited by Gwenda Beed Davey (born 1932) and Graham Seal (born 1950). Davey taught folklore studies at several Victorian universities and was a co-founder, with June Factor, of the Australian Children's Folklore Collection, housed at the University of Melbourne. Seal taught Australian Studies at Curtin University, Perth, and is the author of several books on Australian folklore.

It is not indexed. Articles are not credited to their authors, but major contributors are listed in the Preface.

== Reception ==
A review was published in the The Canberra Times, which said:

"This is not a definitive work. It is a snapshot of the state of this country's folklore studies at this time. It should sit on the bookshelf alongside the other collections of folklore, rather than be seen in any way as a replacement. Better yet, it is a book to sit on a table by a comfortable chair or by the bed to be dipped into and cherished nugget by nugget. Australia does not publish so many books of this sort and quality that we can afford to ignore any of them."
