= Vibratosax =

Plastic saxophone

Vibratosax is the product name of saxophones made from plastic, designed and built by the Thai company Vibrato.

A global patent makes Vibrato Co., Ltd. the sole manufacturer of vibratosaxes, whose parts are mainly created from injection-molded plastic. Currently only Alto saxophones are available. Tenor and Soprano (curved) models have been developed and announced.

== History ==
The Vibratosax’s plastic design is based on the Grafton saxophone, an Alto saxophone with a plastic body available between 1950 and approx. 1968. The saxophone had very good musical properties, amongst others— It has been played by some of the biggest jazz musicians, such as Charlie Parker and Ornette Coleman.

Besides its heavy weight, the saxophone's very brittle, ivory-tinted acrylic shaped using low-pressure molding proved to be another disadvantage. It led to the body's tendency to become irreparably damaged easily, especially on the bow. The weight was mainly caused by the mechanics, which had been comparatively conventionally made from metal. The manufacturer had been forced to cease production after only a few years due to – in relation to the rather low sales price – high production costs and low market acceptance.

Because of the improvements made in plastic quality and manufacturing via thermoplastic injection molding over the past 50 years, the Bangkok-living entrepreneur and passionate saxophonist Piyapat Thanyakij decided in 2009 to revive the concept of a plastic-made saxophone, with its advantages over traditional metal-made saxophones – i.e. low weight, robustness (when using modern plastics), and a consistent and precise reproduction of the body parts – and named the new instrument series Vibratosax.

== Models and series ==
Range	Model/Series	Weight	Introduced	Production Status	Comment
Alto	A1SIII	approx. 850 g	July 2015	In production	
Alto	A1SII	approx. 850 g	201?	Discontinued	To date not available for purchase.
Alto	A1SG	approx. 850 g	201?	Discontinued	25 pcs. limited edition made from polycarbonate with glass filling for higher body density and thus reduced vibration.
Alto	A1S	approx. 850 g	201?	Discontinued	
Alto	A1	approx. 850 g	2010	Discontinued	
Soprano	S1	Unknown	Expected: 2017	In preparation	
Tenor	T1	Unknown	~2020	In production	

The first edition was offered in two models, which differed in the body material used, and were made distinguishable through differently colored pads. The A1 (light grey pads) was a bit cheaper and had a slightly "darker and warmer" sound than the A1S model (orange pads).

The A1 is made of Bayer's blend, a blend of polycarbonate and ABS plastic. The ABS gives elasticity and flexibility, while the polycarbonate provides resonance. The A1S is made of solid polycarbonate. This denser material gives extra resonance, and a more projected and focused sound. The A1 has a darker and warmer tone when compared to the A1S. The "S" in A1S stand for solid, in reference to the A1S's denser and more solid design.

== Design characteristics of the Vibrato Alto saxophone ==
Due to the consequent use of plastics (besides the body, also in the mechanics) Vibrato instruments are very light-weight. The A1 models for instance weigh approx. 850 grams, which is roughly just a third of conventional Alto saxophones, which typically weigh more than 2 kilograms.

The saxophones are also very immune to mechanical damages and corrosion, which has been impressively demonstrated through a video, in which the Hawaiian saxophonist Reggie Padilla is playing a Vibratosax A1S while surfing, on, in and "below" the water.

The body is assembled from numerous glued parts. The main body tube is divided in six sections lengthwise, the bow, bell and neck consist of two mirrored halves each. The mechanic consists of smaller plastic parts which are mounted on hexagonal aluminum rods. The individual keys are secured with screws onto the body. Coil springs are used throughout. The pads are made from silicone and are mounted glue-free with the mechanics for easy replacement and are self-leveling. They move on a pivot to better cover the entire tone hole with less finger pressure required by the player.

== Analysis of the Vibratosax ==
On January 12, 2011, saxophone repairman Matt Stohrer released a YouTube video where he analyzed a pre-production unit of the Vibratosax from a repair perspective. In Stohrer's analysis, he came to the following conclusions:

- One potential problem with the pre-production version of the Vibratosax is an inability to adjust the relationship between certain keys to better tailor the saxophone to an individual user.
- The pre-production Vibratosax's keywork is more flexible than that of a brass saxophone. This could be problematic if the force of the player's fingers alter the relationship between keys by bending them as they are playing. This could have a negative effect on the correct sealing of the pads to the body of the saxophone.
- The pre-production Vibratosax's body tube is assembled from many sections, and each section is reinforced with a thicker portion where the sections meet. The reduction in the tube's inner dimensions at these meeting points could cause potential intonation problems.

Matt Stohrer has relayed his analysis to Piyapat Thanyakij, the president of Vibrato Co., Ltd. so that his recommended improvements could be incorporated into the production version of the Vibratosax.
