= The Oxford Companion to Australian History =

Book about Australian history

- Publication date: 1998
- ISBN: 978-0195515039

The Oxford Companion to Australian History (ISBN 9780195515039) is a book in the series of Oxford Companions published by Oxford University Press, its first edition dated 1998. It contains an alphabetically arranged set of articles on Australian subjects: notable persons, historic events and topics of general interest, ranging in length from 100 to 2,000 words. It has around 720 pages and is bound uniformly with The Oxford Companion to Australian Literature and, no doubt, others in the series.

The revised edition, published 2001, was edited by Graeme Davison, John Hirst and Stuart Macintyre, all three from Victorian universities; Monash, LaTrobe and Melbourne respectively.

Its preface acknowledges a considerable debt to the Australian Dictionary of Biography, but is not exhaustive or detailed; for example it discusses only eight governors-general: Fitzroy, Hasluck, Hayden, Hopetoun, Isaacs, Kerr, McKell and Munro Ferguson; and only Hasluck in any depth. Its list of contributors contains around 320 names of researchers and specialists, mostly academics, with their respective institutions. It is not indexed, but has a list of subjects by category.

== Online edition ==
The full edition is online here
