= The Oxford Companion to the Mind =

The Oxford Companion to the Mind is a reference book on the human mind, edited by Richard L. Gregory. First published in 1987, the book covers a wide range of topics relating to psychology, neuroscience, philosophy, and culture, with entries written by leading scholars in their respective fields. The book has been highly praised for its comprehensive coverage and witty definitions of common human experiences.

The second edition of the book, published in 2004, includes new entries on attachment theory, caffeine, extra-terrestrial intelligence, and imagination. The book also features three "mini symposia" on consciousness, brain scanning, and artificial intelligence, with contributions from a range of specialists. In all, there are over 300 contributors from around the world.

One of the key features of the book is the variety and eminence of its contributors, who range from prominent psychologists such as Skinner and Luria, to writers and artists such as Beryl Bainbridge and Patrick Moore. The editor, Richard L. Gregory, also contributes a number of entries himself, including a detailed discussion of visual illusions and a debunking of ghosts.

The second edition of the book expands on the success of the first, with more entries and a broader coverage of topics.

== Contents ==
The book is organized alphabetically, with entries ranging from scientific concepts like artificial intelligence and neuroscience, to cultural phenomena like aphrodisiacs and extra-terrestrial intelligence. Many of the entries are written by prominent figures in their respective fields, and the book includes biographies of important figures in the study of the mind.

One of the unique features of the book is its inclusion of entries on more unusual topics, such as astrology and levitation. While these topics are treated with skepticism, they are not dismissed outright, and the book's commitment to inclusivity is one of its strengths. In his review of the first edition, John Marshall praised the book's "breadth of coverage" and "diversity of contributors," and the second edition builds on this foundation with more entries and a greater focus on recent developments in the field.
