= The Oxford Companion to Australian Military History =

The Oxford Companion to Australian Military History (ISBN 9780195517842) is a book in the series of Oxford Companions published by Oxford University Press, its first edition dated 1995.

The second edition, published 2008, was written/edited by Peter Dennis, Jeffrey Grey, Ewan Morris, Robin Prior, and Jean Bou.

== Reviews ==
A reviewer for Army magazine praised the book for its readability and scope, but found its coverage patchy — giving good coverage to some topics while ignoring others, equally worthy. He thought a companion volume on Australian military hardware was needed.
