= Susan Durant =

British artist (1827–1873)

- Born: 8 July 1827; Stamford Hill, England
- Died: 1 January 1873 (aged 45); Paris, France
- Known for: Sculpture

Susan Durant Durant (8 July 1827 – 1 January 1873) was a British artist and sculptor. She was one of the first female sculptors to achieve critical and financial success in Victorian Britain. Durant created a substantial body of work, often in marble and featuring characters from English literature or the Bible, but much of which has been lost.

== Biography ==
Durant was born in Stamford Hill in Middlesex, now part of London, to George and Mary Durant, née Dugdale, who were both from Devon. George Durant was a successful silk broker and on at least one occasion the family spent a winter in Rome which encouraged Susan Durant's interest in sculpture.

She moved to Paris where she trained in the studio of Baron Henri de Triqueti. Although she established a studio in London, Durant frequently returned to Paris to work with de Triqueti either as his assistant or on common commissions. In 1847 she was awarded the Isis silver medal of the Society of Arts for an original portrait bust. From 1847 until her death, Durant frequently exhibited portrait busts at the Royal Academy in London, including a self-portrait in 1853. In total Durant exhibited some 38 works at the Royal Academy.

=== Notable works ===
Two works by Durant, The Chief Mourner and Belisarius, were featured in the Great Exhibition held in London during 1851, and her statuette of Robin Hood was shown at the 1857 Art Treasures Exhibition in Manchester. In 1857 she created a marble bust of the American author Harriet Beecher Stowe, which is now held at the Harriet Beecher Stowe Centre in Connecticut, while Castle Howard in Yorkshire has a plaster version. The bust, showing Stowe garlanded with grape leaves and wearing a shawl fastened by a cameo broach of her husband, helped enhance Durant's reputation. The Stowe portrait and a 1863 medallion of George Grote, held by University College, London, are among the two earliest known surviving portrait works by Durant. In 1863 Durant was the only woman among the 14 artists commissioned by the Corporation of London to provide sculptures of figures from literature to decorate the Egyptian Hall of the Mansion House. Her sculpture of The Faithfull Shepherdess earned Durant a fee of £500.

The Faithful Shepherdess, (1863).

Portrait of a Lady, (1866) Princess Alexandra or Princess Alice.

Through de Triqueti, Durant was introduced to members of the British Royal Family and received several commissions from Queen Victoria and, for a time, taught model making to Princess Louise. Durant was commissioned to produce high-relief profiles on polychrome marble roundels of Victoria, Prince Albert and their children for the Albert Chapel in Windsor Castle. Reduced size copies were also cast in metal as official gifts, a set of which are in the collection of the National Portrait Gallery in London. The Queen commissioned Durant to produce a memorial to her uncle, King Leopold I of Belgium, for Saint George's Chapel in Windsor Castle. The monument, showing the king reclining with his hand on a lion in front of two angels in relief holding the flags of England and Belgium, was unveiled at Windsor in 1867 where it remained until 1879 when it was moved to Christ Church in Esher. Durant's style of working further developed over time, becoming more naturalistic and further embracing the use of polychromatic marble, a technique promoted by de Triqueti, for example in her 1871 portrait of a child, Nina Lehmann.

Ruth, (1869) was auctioned at Drouot.

Durant became a collaborator on a pendant commissioned by Queen Victoria as a gift to Victoria Alexandrina Elizabeth Grey for her wedding in June 1877.

=== Death and legacy ===
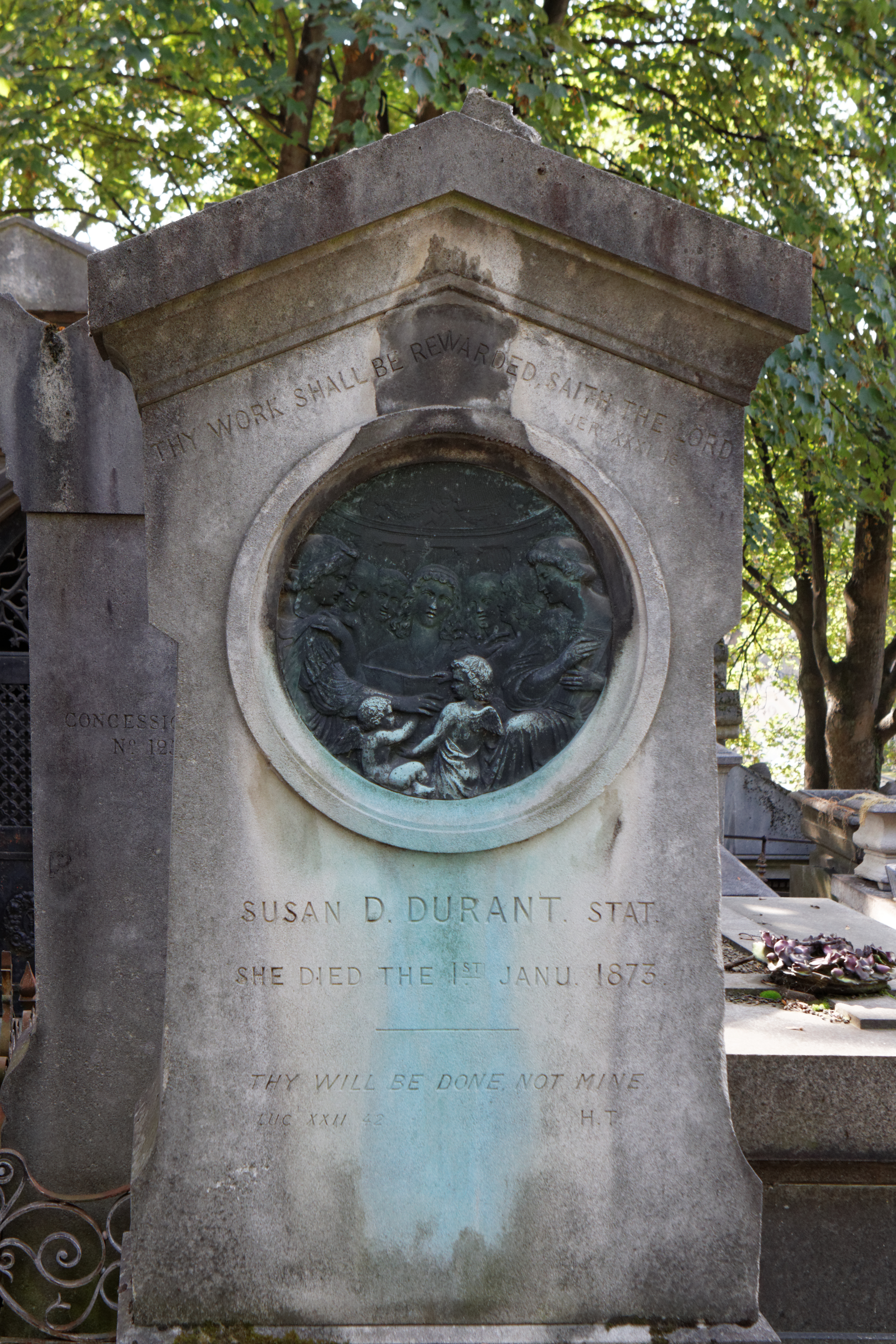
Susan Durant's Gravestone in Père-Lachaise Cemetery

During her life, Durant promoted equal access for women to education, the vote and to professional careers. Among her last known works was a bust, now lost, of Elizabeth Garrett Anderson.

Durant never married but in 1869 had a son, Paul Harvey by de Triqueti. She died of pleurisy in Paris in 1873 and is buried in that city's Pere Lachaise Cemetery.

== Selected exhibitions ==
- 1847 Royal Academy, London;- Also in 1848 to 1853; 1856 to 1860, 1863, 1864, 1866 to 1869, 1872 and 1873
- 1851 Great Exhibition, London
- 1857 Art Treasures Exhibition, Manchester
- 1858 & 1863 Society of Female Artists
- 1860 British Institution
- 1862 International Exhibition, London.
