= Paul Harvey (diplomat) =

British diplomat and reference writer

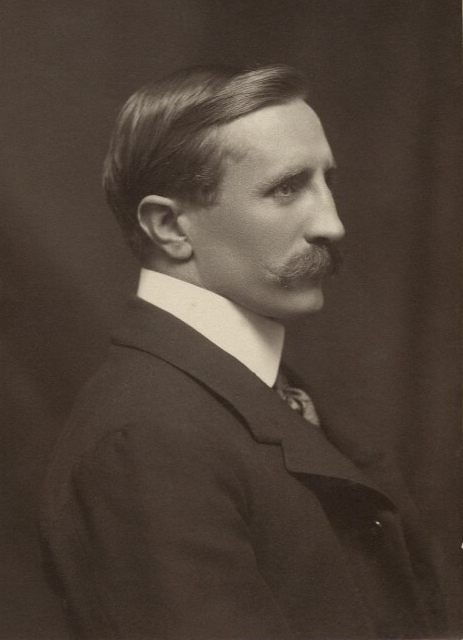

Sir Henry Paul Harvey KCMG CB (born Durant; 1 October 1869 – 30 December 1948) was a British diplomat and editor of literary reference works. He compiled The Oxford Companion to English Literature (1932), the first of the Oxford Companions series.

== Life ==
Born in Paris, Harvey was the illegitimate child of the French sculptor Henri Joseph François, Baron de Triqueti and the English sculptor Susan Durant. After his mother died in 1873 when he was 4 years old, he was brought up by Blanche Lee Childe, his aunt or half-sister; when Childe also died in 1886, he was sponsored by Augusta, Lady Gregory with help from Henry James. Educated at Rugby School and New College, Oxford, he married Ethel Frances Persse, daughter of Col. Edward Persse, in 1896. Their daughter was photographer Merlyn Severn.

Harvey was (Assistant) Private Secretary to the Marquess of Lansdowne, Secretary of State for War, from 1895 to 1900. He was Egyptian Financial Advisor from 1907 to 1912 and 1919 to 1920. He was appointed a Companion of the Order of the Bath (CB) in 1901 and a Knight Commander of the Order of St Michael and St George (KCMG) in 1911.

Prompted by a suggestion of Kenneth Sisam at the Oxford University Press, Harvey compiled the Oxford Companion to English Literature, the first of the Oxford Companions. He subsequently compiled the Companion to Classical Literature, and was working on the Companion to French Literature at the time of his death.

== Works ==
- The Oxford Companion to English Literature, 1932
- The Oxford Companion to Classical Literature, 1937
- The Oxford Companion to French Literature, 1959 (with Janet E. Heseltine)
