= Merlyn Severn =

English photographer (1897–1973)

Merlyn Severn (1897–1973) was an English photographer. She spent seven years working as a photojournalist in Africa, but is most remembered for changing the direction of dance photography from focusing on posed photographs to action shots.

== Life ==
She was born Dorothy Susan Harvey on 8 August 1897 in Chelsea, London, to civil servant Sir Paul Harvey and his wife Ethel, née Persse.

During World War II, she worked for the WAAF in radar, and spent a period of internment on German-occupied Guernsey.

Later in life she lived in Salisbury, Southern Rhodesia, before returning to live in Aller Park, Devon, and she died in Devon on 12 November 1973.

== Photographic career ==
A self-taught photographer, she photographed Michel Fokine’s Blum Company in their opening season in June 1936, which led to a book, Ballet in Action; a one-person show; and six photographs being accepted by the London Salon of Photography in 1937. Particular in her methods, she used ultra-speed film imported from America to allow her to print exhibition-quality prints directly from negatives. Her use of dance action shots was innovative, and she defended it in the introduction to her book.

Between 1945 and 1947, she was a full-time staff photographer for Picture Post. Working freelance for the same paper, Severn spent seven years in Africa, covering stories in the Belgian Congo and Ruanda-Urundi. She collaborated with Hugh Tracey on African Dances of the Witwatersrand Gold Mines, and wrote an account of her travels, Congo Pilgrim.

In 1956, she wrote an account of her photographic career, Double Exposure.

== Works ==
- Ballet in Action (1938)
- Sadler's Wells Ballet at Covent Garden (1947)
- (with Hugh Tracey) African Dances of the Witwatersand Gold Mines (1952)
- Congo Pilgrim (1954)
- Double Exposure (1956)
