= The Oxford Companion to Australian Literature =

The Oxford Companion to Australian Literature (ISBN 019553381X) is a book in the series of Oxford Companions published by Oxford University Press, its first edition dated 1985. It contains over 3,000 articles on Australian subjects: authors, titles, and literary topics, ranging in length from 100 to 5,000 words, arranged alphabetically. It has around 830 pages and is bound uniformly with The Oxford Companion to Australian History and, no doubt, others in the series. The essay-length articles are mostly credited to their authors, otherwise entries are published anonymously. The preface acknowledges a debt to the Australian Dictionary of Biography.

The authors originally planned to omit contemporary authors, but ultimately settled on inclusion. During editing, the publishers overcounted the word count and told the editors that 200 000 words needed to be cut. Upon correction, the book was published with around the same number of words.

The second edition, published 1994, was edited by William H. Wilde, Joy Hooton and Barry Andrews (died 1987), and was around 200 000 words longer than the first. All three were academics at the Australian Defence Force Academy, Canberra.

== Reception ==
=== First edition ===
In the London Review of Books, the poet and essayist A. D. Hope gave a positive review, describing the book as well-justified in its size, with an approach that "on the whole [has] been carried out with judgment, discretion and economy". Hope attributed broad significance to the work, identifying it as a "landmark" in the development of a literature on Australian writing, and placing it in the context of English literature moving from the domain of England to all English-speaking nations. Slight criticism was given to the detail given to explaining horse-racing, and the accuracy and sophistication of the texts discussion of Aboriginal Australians.

Basil Cottle reviewed the book in The Review of English Studies, praising the prose and wit of some entries while criticising the length of others and the inclusion of some long lists (e.g. Children's Book of the Year awardees) and subjects (for instance, Rolf Harris and Errol Flynn). "Strong Republicanism and Irishism" was identified in some articles, and Cottle pointed out several factual and grammatical errors. By contrast, entries on subjects such as "Convicts, Aborigines, Anthologies" and major authors were praised as "truly Companionable".

=== Second edition ===
Peter Pierce authored a review in the Australian Book Review.
