= Levitation =

Levitation, Levitate, or Levitating may refer to:

== Concepts ==
- Levitation (illusion), an illusion where a magician appears to levitate a person or object
- Levitation (paranormal), the claimed paranormal phenomenon of levitation, occurring without any scientific explanation
- Levitation (physics), the process by which an object is suspended against gravity, in a stable position without solid physical contact
- Levitation of saints, a mystical phenomenon attributed to some saints

== Music ==
=== Albums ===
- Levitation (Hawkwind album)
- Levitation (Flamingods album)
- Levitate (Bruce Hornsby album)
- Levitate (The Fall album)

=== Songs ===
- "Levitating" (song), 2020 song by Dua Lipa
- "Levitate" (Hadouken! song), 2013
- "Levitate" (Imagine Dragons song), 2016
- "Levitate" (Twenty One Pilots song), 2018
- "untitled 07 | levitate", 2016 song by Kendrick Lamar
- "Levitation", song by Beach House from Depression Cherry
- "Levitation", song by Circa Zero from Circus Hero
- "Levitation", song by Fallujah from The Flesh Prevails
- "(Levitation)", song by Kasabian from 48:13
- "The Levitated", song by Scale the Summit from The Collective
- "Levitate", song by Bleed from Within from Shrine
- "Levitate", song by Sleep Token from Sundowning, 2019
- "Levitate", song by Hollywood Undead from American Tragedy, 2010
- "Levitate", song by Imelda May from Life Love Flesh Blood
- "Levitate", song by Opshop from You Are Here

== Other ==
- Levitation (band), an English psychedelic band, 1990–1994
- Levitation (festival), an annual psychedelic music festival founded in 2008
- Party levitation, aka "Light as a feather, stiff as a board", a party game
- Levitating (film), a 2026 supernatural drama film
- Levitation (film), a 1997 Scott D. Goldstein film
