= The Oxford Companion to Australian Jazz =

Book about Australian folklore

- Author: Bruce Johnson
- Genre: music
- Publisher: Oxford University Press
- Publication date: November 1987
- Publication place: Australia
- ISBN: 978-0-195-54791-7
- Dewey Decimal: 781.650994
- LC Class: ML102.J3 J6

The Oxford Companion to Australian Jazz (ISBN 0195547918) is a book in the series of Oxford Companions published by Oxford University Press. It was written and edited by Bruce Johnson, an academic, prolific author and jazz trumpeter from New South Wales, with some specialist articles by guest contributors.

The book was released in November 1987, and was considered as being indispensable for serious followers of jazz. Opening with an essay history of jazz in Australia, the book also contains over 220 pages of biographies or articles on bands, alphabetically arranged.

Johnson spent five years researching and writing the book, and it led to his next project where he would research "jazz, radical politics, and art." In 1989, Johnson presented a series of radio programs on the history of Australian jazz that grew from his work on the Oxford Companion to Australian Jazz and his archives collected during the research process. The radio program received the Public Broadcasters Association of Australia Music Award for excellence, and a Certificate of Merit at the Australian Hi-Fi FM Awards.

== Reviews ==
In his review for The Age, Adrian Jackson wrote that Johnson had superseded the work of Andrew Bisset's Black Roots, White Flowers: A History of Jazz in Australia, but noted there was a bias towards the Sydney jazz scene due to Johnson's own experience there. Jackson further criticised the writing style as being "difficult to read" and featuring some omissions, but concluded the book as being indispensable.

In The Sydney Morning Herald, Joya Jenson wrote that the publisher should be congratulated "on undertaking this pioneering project. The initial edition, a good-looking production, presents itself as an interesting beginning for what one would hope is a frequently updated series."

Jill Skyes, in The Sydney Morning Herald, noted that while who was or wasn't included in the collection of biographies would likely cause some discussion, the books index allowed the reader to find mention of those who didn't get an individual write up.

Bob Dixon wrote for The Canberra Times, that both Johnson's book and a newly updated edition of Bisset's Black Roots, White Flowers filled a lack of documentation over Australian jazz. In Johnson's book, Dixon found the biographies "clearly written and informative" though noted the opening essay was written in an academic style that "may have a limited appeal for some readers."

JazzTimes called it "a very thorough piece of work and a remarkable testimony to the international appeal of jazz." In The Musical Times, Alyn Shipton echoed other reviewers over the exclusion of details or individuals in the biographies, but commended the book "for having drawn together so comprehensive a body of information."
