= The Oxford Companion to Classical Literature =

- Cover of the first edition
- Author: Sir Paul Harvey
- Language: English
- Publisher: Oxford University Press
- Publication date: 1937
- Media type: Print

The Oxford Companion to Classical Literature is a book in the series of Oxford Companions produced by Oxford University Press. It is compiled and edited by Sir Paul Harvey, Fellow of St Anne's College, Oxford and lecturer in Classical Languages at the University of Oxford.

The book provides an alphabetically arranged reference to classical literature. The second edition was published in 1989, the third in 2011.

ISBN 0-19-866121-5.
