= The Oxford Companion to Cosmology =

2008 encyclopedia of cosmology

The Oxford Companion to Cosmology is a comprehensive encyclopedia on the subject of cosmology. It was edited by Andrew Liddle and Jon Loveday, both established experts in theoretical and observational cosmology. The book contains over 350 in-depth entries on various topics in cosmology, including cosmic inflation, dark energy, and the Higgs boson. The Oxford Companion to Cosmology was published in 2008 by Oxford University Press.

The structure of the universe, the evolution of galaxies, and the role of cold dark matter are all discussed in the book. The entries cover both theoretical ideas, such as alternative cosmologies, and observational evidence, such as redshift surveys and cosmic microwave background radiation. The book is written in a highly accessible style, making it an ideal resource for students, teachers, and anyone with a serious interest in cosmology.

The Oxford Companion to Cosmology covers the current consensus on the origins and development of the universe, including the Big Bang and the Standard Cosmological Model. Extensive cross-referencing and a glossary help readers to understand the complex terminology used in the book. Selected illustrations bring the subject to life, and entry-level web links provide access to recommended online resources.
