= Henri de Triqueti =

French sculptor and artist (1803–1874)

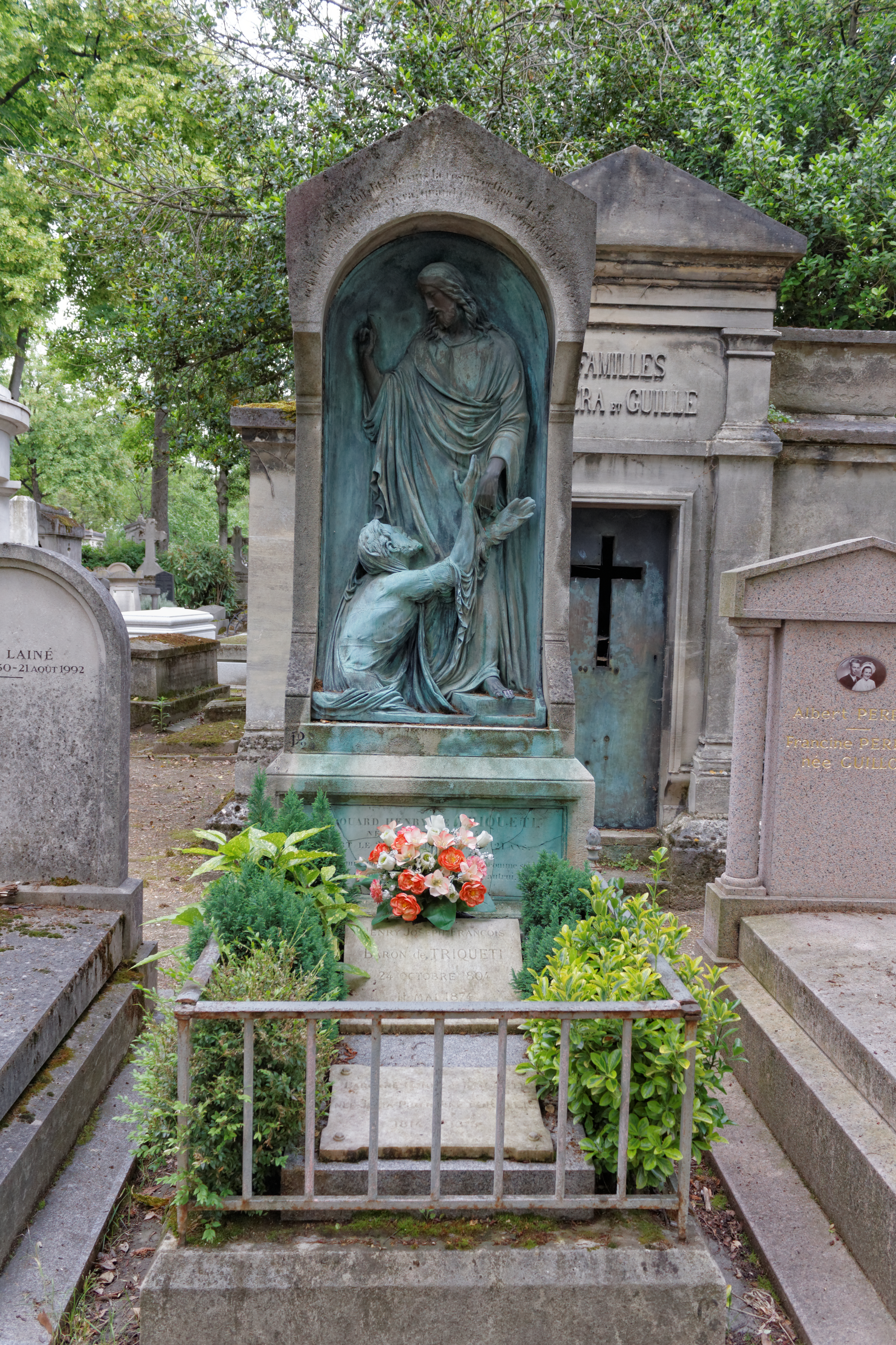
Triqueti's tomb at Père Lachaise Cemetery, Paris

Baron Henri Joseph François de Triqueti (24 October 1803 – 11 May 1874), also spelt Henry de Triqueti, was a French sculptor and artist.

== Early life and education ==
Henri Joseph François de Triqueti was born in the Château du Perthuis in Conflans-sur-Loing, the son of Piedmontese industrialist and diplomat Baron Michel de Triqueti, a native of Annecy. In 1788, Michel Triquet was made a baron by King Victor Amadeus III of Sardinia and the name changed to Triqueti.

== Career ==
Triqueti's career started around 1830, when he turned to sculpture, and away from painting, which had been his chief preoccupation up to this point. Triqueti progressively assumed the position of one of the July Monarchy’s official sculptors, obtained the patronage of King Louis-Philippe. The bronze doors of the church of La Madeleine in Paris (1834–41), and the tomb effigy of Ferdinand-Philippe d’Orléans (1842) are the key works of the first period of his career, the "French" phase (1831–48).

With the fall of the July Monarchy in 1848, Triqueti redoubled his efforts in England, establishing links with prestigious patrons, chief among them the royal couple. His standing as an artist, his deep piety and extensive knowledge of Renaissance art endeared him to Prince Albert; his "English" phase lasted from 1849 until his death.

In 1859, Triqueti created Cleopatra Dying, an ivory and bronze sculpture on a marble and ebony base, shown at P. & D. Colnaghi & Co., bought by Sir Ivor Guest and since 2019 at the Victoria and Albert Museum, London. An archetype of a femme fatale, it was a popular subject in Victorian art and the first chryselephantine work to arrive in England.

In England, he is best known for his tarsia wall panels and marble tomb-chest for the Albert Memorial Chapel, Windsor Castle, in 1864–1874. A tarsia panel in St Michael's church at Teffont Evias, Wiltshire, installed in 1863, depicts the choir of angels. There are also three memorials by Triqueti at St James's Church, Draycot Cerne, Wiltshire; these are to William Pole-Tylney-Long-Wellesley, 5th Earl of Mornington, Adelaide Wellesley and Cecil Wellesley.

== Personal life and death ==
He married Julia Philippine Forster, granddaughter of the British sculptor Thomas Banks, with whom he had two children: Blanche Eugénie Cécile Sophie de Triqueti Childe and Édouard Henry de Triqueti.

Through his relationship with the English sculptor Susan Durant, one of his students, he was the father of the diplomat Sir Paul Harvey, born in 1869.

Henry de Triqueti died on 11 May 1874 at his house 65, Rue d'Amsterdam in the 8th arrondissement of Paris, and was buried at the Père-Lachaise cemetery.
