= Zuppa Romana =

Zuppa Romana may refer to:

- Zuppa Romana (dessert), a German variation of the Italian dessert zuppa inglese
- Zuppa Romana (song), a 1983 song by the German band Schrott nach 8
