= The Oxford Companion to Food =

Encyclopedia about food

The Oxford Companion to Food The Penguin Companion to Food
- Cover of the first edition
- Editor: Alan Davidson
- Language: English
- Subject: Food
- Publisher: Oxford University Press
- Publication date: 1999, 2006, 2014
- Publication place: United Kingdom
- Media type: Print
- ISBN: 0-19-211579-0

The Oxford Companion to Food is an encyclopedia about food. It was edited by Alan Davidson and published by Oxford University Press in 1999. It was also issued in softcover under the name The Penguin Companion to Food. Following Davidson's death in 2003, the second and third editions were edited by Tom Jaine and published by Oxford in 2006 and 2014.

The book, Davidson's magnum opus with "more than a million words, mostly his own", covers the nature and history of foodstuffs worldwide, starting from aardvark and ending with zuppa inglese. It is compiled with especially strong coverage of European and in particular British cookery and contains no recipes. It was an "outgrowth" of the annual Oxford Symposium on Food and Cookery.

The entry for this work in WorldCat includes the following abstract:

The 2,650 alphabetical entries in this compendium represent 20 years of Davidson's work. They include information on specific foods, cooking terms, culinary tools, countries, traditions, and biographies of chefs and cookbook authors. The entries for countries cover foods, habits, and holidays with special foods. The entries about traditions cover religious laws that deal with food and/or fasting, such as Ramadan and kosher laws. There are 39 longer articles about staple foods such as rice and apples. A comprehensive bibliography provides access to further information. The book does not contain recipes, but it is an excellent companion for sources such as the Larousse Gastronomique.

Major articles are signed and include bibliographic references, and there is a comprehensive overall bibliography. Some of the material in it was previously published in Davidson's Petits Propos Culinaires.

== Editions ==
- Alan Davidson (1999). The Oxford Companion to Food. Oxford: Oxford University Press. ISBN 0-19-211579-0.
- Alan Davidson (2002). The Penguin Companion to Food. London: Penguin Books. ISBN 0-14-051522-4.
- Alan Davidson (2002). The Penguin Companion to Food. London: Penguin Books. ISBN 0-14-200163-5. (later reprints)
- Alan Davidson (2006). Tom Jaine, Jane Davidson and Helen Saberi (ed.). The Oxford Companion to Food (2nd ed.). Oxford: Oxford University Press. ISBN 0-19-280681-5.
- Alan Davidson (2014). Tom Jaine (ed.). The Oxford Companion to Food (3rd ed.). Oxford: Oxford University Press. ISBN 978-0-19-967733-7.

== Reception ==
The New York Times called the book "a masterly work with a variety of voices, from the straightforward, almost dry, to the quirky and the witty" and a work "dense with extremely thorough and well-written entries, enhanced by cross-references and indexes and larded with anecdotes and strong opinions."

The American Library Association recognized The Oxford Companion to Food with an Honorable Mention in the Dartmouth Medal competition for 2000, as well as inclusion as one of its Outstanding reference sources 2000 by the Reference Sources Committee of the Reference and User Services Association (RULA). In May 2000, it received a James Beard Foundation Award as best reference work.

== See also ==
- The Oxford Companion to:
  - Beer
  - Spirits & Cocktails
  - Sugar and Sweets
  - Wine
- Bibliography of cuisine encyclopedias
