= Zaleti =

Italian cornmeal cookie

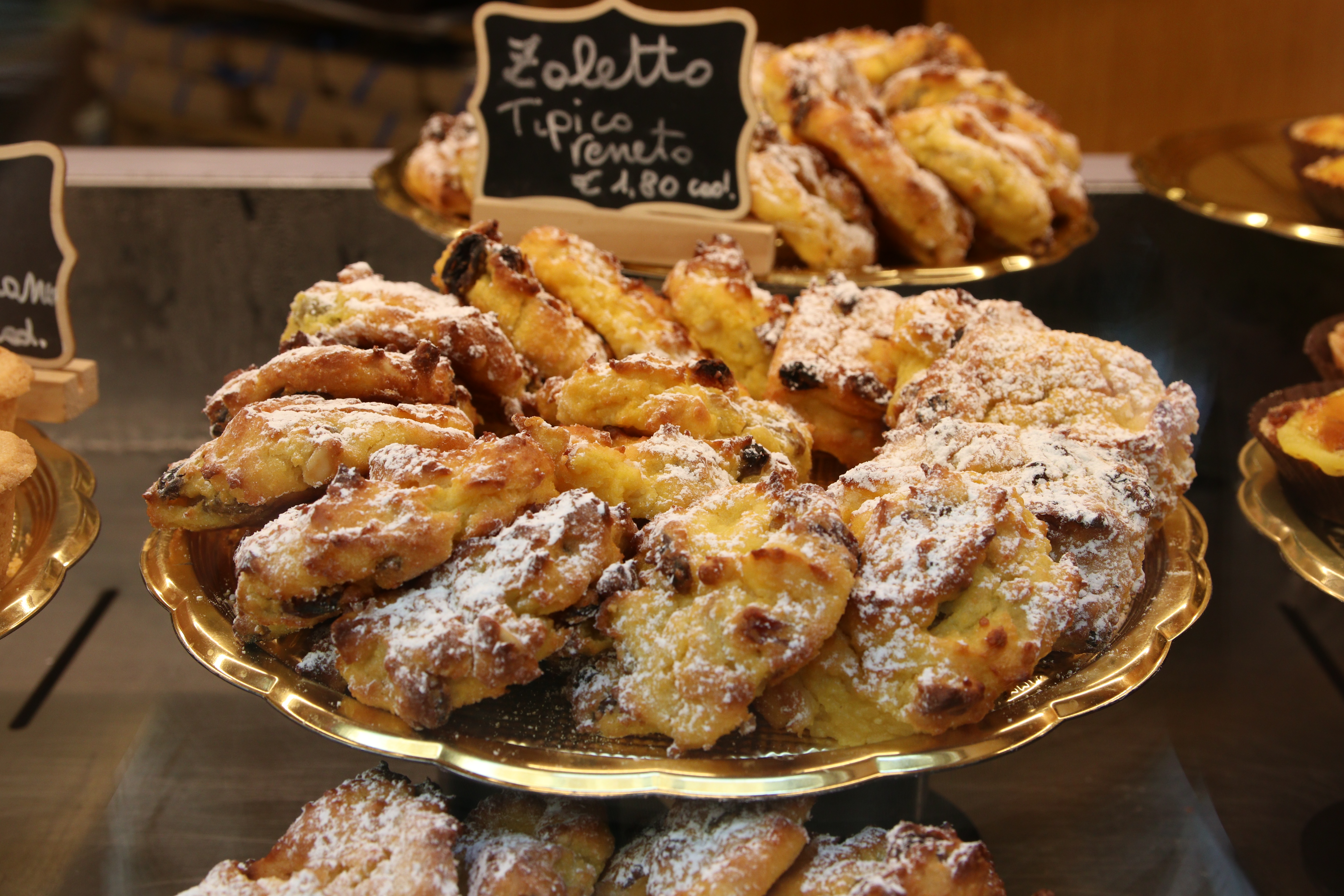
Zaleti in a pastry shop window

Zaleti (meaning "the little yellow ones" in the Venetian dialect) are an Italian cornmeal cookie made with milk, raisins―often soaked in water or grappa—and rum. They are crunchy, small and oblong in shape, and have a yellow colour from their cornmeal content.

Zaleti are a specialty of the Veneto region, where cornmeal, or polenta, is a staple. In the cities of the region, zaleti are sold out of bread and cake shops. They are associated with Carnival, and are known under several names and spellings, with the name buranelli standard on the island of Burano, and other spellings in the Venetian dialect including saeti, xaeti, and zaletti.

Zaleti emerged in Veneto during the 16th century, and historically were eaten when dipped in coffee or hot chocolate. Their first substantial mention appears in 1749 with the Venetian playwright Carlo Goldoni, who includes a reference in his comedy "La Buona Moglie". A recipe is supplied in the 1802 cookbook La nuova cucina economica by the Roman author Vincenzo Agnoletti. His zaleti differs from modern preparations, containing orange zest, yeast, a mixture of wheat flour and corn flour, butter, and a sugar glaze. Another, later recipe is given by Pellegrino Artusi. Today, like other biscuits eaten in Veneto, zaleti is often dipped in a glass of sweet wine before being eaten.

== See also ==
- Biscotti
- Cuisine of Veneto

== Sources ==
- Del Conte, Anna (2004) [2001]. The Concise Gastronomy of Italy. New York, London: Barnes & Noble Books. ISBN 0-7607-6344-5.
- De Silva, Carla (2015). "Venice". In Goldstein, Darra (ed.). The Oxford Companion to Sugar and Sweets. Oxford, Oxfordshire & New York, London: Oxford University Press. ISBN 978-0-19-931339-6.
- di Schino, June (2015). "Biscotti". In Goldstein, Darra (ed.). The Oxford Companion to Sugar and Sweets. Oxford, Oxfordshire & New York, London: Oxford University Press. ISBN 978-0-19-931339-6.
- Edwards, Anastasia (2019). Biscuits and Cookies: A Global History. London: Reaktion Books. ISBN 978-1-78914-049-1.
- Marcato, Carla (Winter 2018). "La dialettalità in scritture esposte a Venezia". Italica. 95 (4). JSTOR 45173047.
- Roufs, Timothy; Roufs, Kathleen (2014). Sweet Treats Around the World: An Encyclopedia of Food and Culture. Santa Barbara, California: ABC-CLIO. ISBN 978-1-61069-220-5.
