= Bibliography of encyclopedias: cuisine =

This is a list of encyclopedias and encyclopedic/biographical dictionaries published on the subject of cuisine, cookery and chefs in any language. Entries are in the English language unless stated as otherwise.

- Albala, Ken (31 May 2011). Food Cultures of the World Encyclopedia (in 4 volumes). ABC-CLIO. ISBN 978-0-313-37627-6.
- Allen, Gary; Albala, Ken, eds. (2007). The Business of Food: Encyclopedia of the Food and Drink Industries. Greenwood Press. ISBN 978-0-313-06917-8.
- Arduser, Lora; Brown, Douglas Robert (1 June 2004). The Encyclopedia of Restaurant Training: A Complete Ready-to-Use Training Program for All Positions in the Food Service Industry. Atlantic Publishing Company. ISBN 978-0-910627-34-4.
- Davidson, Alan; Jaine, Tom, eds. (2014). The Oxford Companion to Food (3rd ed.). Oxford University Press. ISBN 978-0-19-967733-7.
- Dekura, Hideo (15 April 2012). Encyclopedia of Japanese Cuisine. New Holland Publishers Pty, Limited. ISBN 978-1-74257-018-1.
- Jonathan, Deutsch; Murakhver, Natalya (31 January 2012). They Eat That?: A Cultural Encyclopedia of Weird and Exotic Food from around the World. ABC-CLIO. ISBN 978-0-313-38058-7.
- Ducasse, Alain (1 December 2007). Grand Livre de Cuisine: Alain Ducasse's Culinary Encyclopedia. Harry N. Abrams. ISBN 978-2-84844-038-5.
- Duram, Leslie A. (2010). Encyclopedia of Organic, Sustainable, and Local Food. ABC-CLIO. p. 320. ISBN 978-0-313-35963-7.
- Folse, John D. (31 December 2004). The Encyclopedia of Cajun & Creole Cuisine. Chef John Folse & Company Pub. ISBN 978-0-9704457-1-1.
- Fulton, Margaret (1 April 2009). Encyclopedia of Food and Cookery: The Complete Kitchen Companion from A to Z. Hardie Grant Publishing. ISBN 978-1-74066-737-1.
- Goldstein, Darra, ed. (2015). The Oxford Companion to Sugar and Sweets. Oxford: Oxford University Press. ISBN 978-0-199-31339-6.
- Katz, Solomon H.; Weaver, William Woys (2003). Encyclopedia of Food and Culture: Obesity to Zoroastrianism. Index. Scribner. ISBN 978-0-684-80567-2.
- Marks, Gil (14 September 2010). Encyclopedia of Jewish Food. John Wiley & Sons. p. 23. ISBN 978-0-470-39130-3.
- Pizam, Abraham (26 July 2012). International Encyclopedia of Hospitality Management. Routledge. p. 300. ISBN 978-1-136-39415-7.
- Smith, Andrew F. (2004). The Oxford Encyclopedia of Food and Drink in America: A-J. Oxford University Press. ISBN 978-0-19-517551-6.
- Smith, Andrew F. (30 August 2006). Encyclopedia of Junk Food And Fast Food. Greenwood Publishing Group. ISBN 978-0-313-33527-3.
- Snodgrass, Mary (27 September 2004). Encyclopedia of Kitchen History. Taylor & Francis. ISBN 978-1-57958-380-4.
- Vita, Oretta Zanini De (15 October 2009). Encyclopedia of Pasta. University of California Press. ISBN 978-0-520-25522-7.
- Walden, Hilary (November 1986). Encyclopedia of Creative Cuisine. Book Sales. ISBN 978-1-55521-090-8.

== Alcoholic drinks ==
- Boulton, Christopher (August 2013). Encyclopaedia of Brewing. Chichester, West Sussex: Wiley-Blackwell. ISBN 978-1-4051-6744-4.
- Oliver, Garrett, ed. (October 2011). The Oxford Companion to Beer (Hardcover). Oxford Companion To... Tom Colicchio (Foreword) (1st ed.). Oxford University Press. ISBN 978-0195367133.
- Rhodes, Christine P.; Lappies, Pamela B., eds. (October 1997). The Encyclopedia of Beer (paperback) (Reprint ed.). New York, NY: Henry Holt & Co. ISBN 0805055541.
- Robinson, Jancis, ed. (2015) [1994]. The Oxford Companion to Wine (4th ed.). New York: Oxford University Press. ISBN 978-0-19-870538-3.
- Webb, Tim; Beaumont, Stephen (October 2012). The World Atlas of Beer: The Essential Guide to the Beers of the World (Hardcover). New York, NY: Sterling Epicure. ISBN 978-1402789618.
- Wondrich, David; Rothbaum, Noah, eds. (2021). The Oxford Companion to Spirits & Cocktails. New York: Oxford University Press. ISBN 9780199311132.

== See also ==
- Bibliography of encyclopedias
