= The Oxford Companion to Sugar and Sweets =

2015 reference book on sugar

- Editor: Darra Goldstein
- Series: Oxford Companions
- Publisher: Oxford University Press
- Publication date: 2015
- ISBN: 978-0-19-931339-6

The Oxford Companion to Sugar and Sweets is a 2015 reference work edited by food scholar Darra Goldstein. It was released by Oxford University Press as part of the Oxford Companions series. The book contains a foreword by anthropologist Sidney Mintz.

The book gives a cultural history of sugar and sweets from a range of perspectives, including those of chemists, academics, food writers and confectioners. It is made up of almost 600 entries written by 265 contributors, arranged alphabetically from à la Mode to zuppa inglese. Entries cover topics from specific items, such as pies or lollipops, to broad cultural themes, covering for instance the presence of sweets in children's literature. Although much of the content covered is whimsical, entries also emphasize unpleasant themes in the sugar industry including obesity and poor labor conditions.

The book was released to wide praise. Several reviewers highlighted the breadth and depth of coverage, and the inclusion of many intriguing historical curiosities was singled out as making the book engaging to a broad audience. The work's treatment of political themes was generally praised, with the exception of food writer Paul Levy, who felt it was emphasized at the expense of other content. In 2016, the book was nominated for the James Beard Foundation Award in the category "Reference and Scholarship", and was described by Library Journal as the most popular reference work of the previous year.

== Writing ==
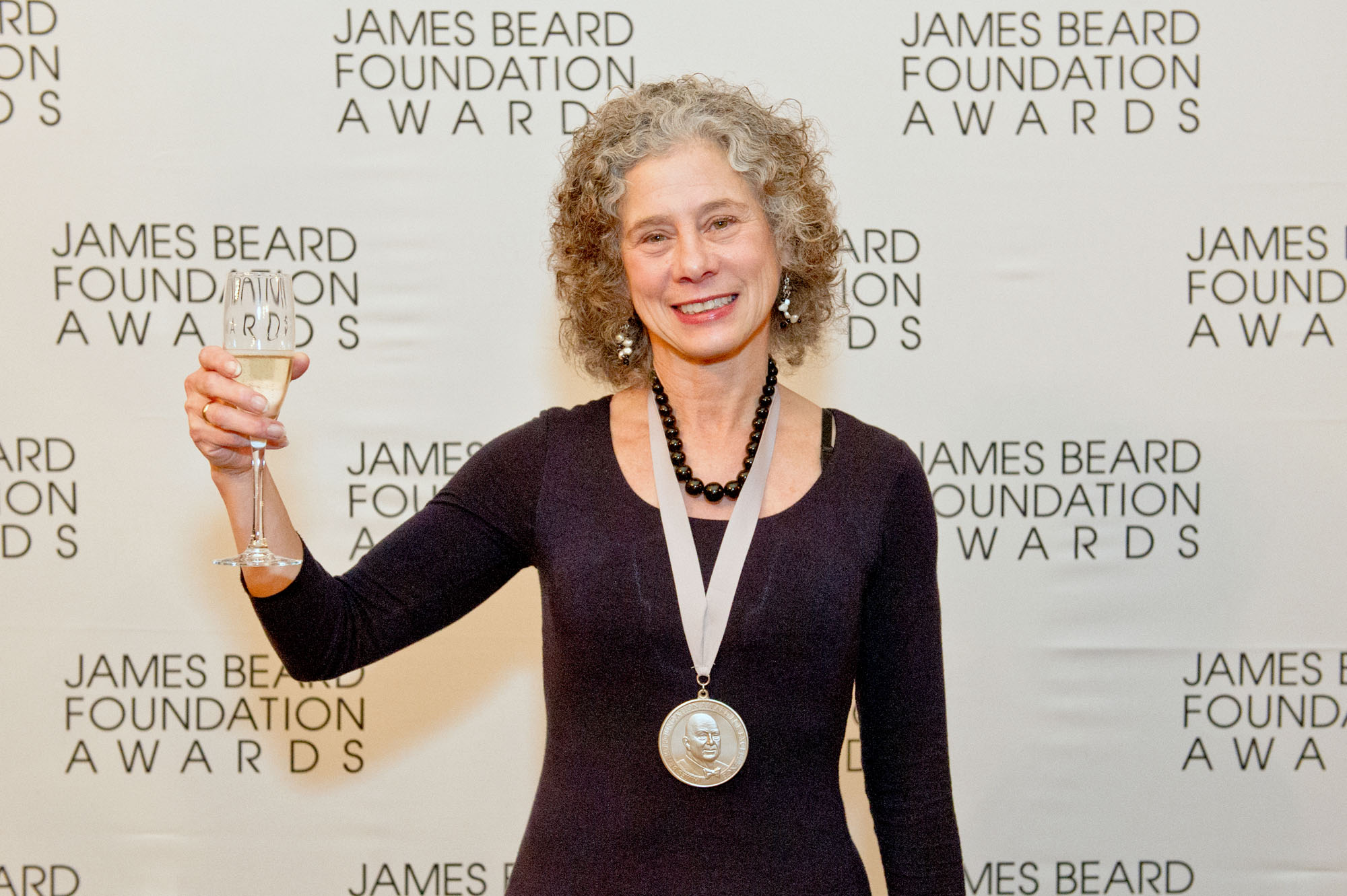
Editor Darra Goldstein

Oxford University Press was not initially looking to publish a book on desserts but rather a text on "world food" for their Oxford Companions series. They approached Darra Goldstein, an American food scholar known as the creator of the academic journal Gastronomica to see if she would have any interest in such a project, but she declined. Goldstein had previously covered the topic of the international politics of food in research for the Council of Europe on how food could be used to promote "tolerance and diversity". Despite her initial refusal, Goldstein returned with a proposal for a book on sweetness.

The Oxford Companion to Sugar and Sweets was written by 265 contributors from a range of backgrounds, including academics, chemists, confectioners, food writers and neuroscientists. Among them were public health advocate Marion Nestle, culinary historian Maricel Presilla and journalist Raymond Sokolov. A foreword was written by anthropologist Sidney Mintz, the author of the very influential political economy study Sweetness and Power (1985). Goldstein served as editor, working on the project for 2.5 years.

The book was published during a period when food studies were receiving increasing attention. This was part of the cultural turn, a broader shift in the humanities wherein the subject of analysis moved from high culture to everyday objects.

== Contents ==
Over around 900 pages and almost six hundred entries, the book approaches the subject of sweetness and the universality of its appeal from the perspective of multiple disciplines. Goldstein describes the book as a "cultural history" of sugar and sweetness. The material is divided into 25 topics to allow readers to focus on what takes their interest, as opposed to reading cover-to-cover, and its subjects range from the familiar to the obscure, focusing on their histories. Entries are arranged alphabetically from à la Mode to zuppa inglese.

The book covers discrete subjects such as specific confections, biographies and places, (for example: pie, Milton S. Hershey and New Orleans), as well as broader thematic content including sugar's role and presence in human evolution, children's literature and cosmetics. Throughout the text, assorted historical curiosities are detailed. In one instance of this, a theory of the creation of lollipops in late-19th-century Canada is discussed, which posits they were initially pieces of hard candy affixed to writing slate pencils, done to try to keep student's hands clean.

The book also extensively discusses controversial and unpleasant aspects of sugar. These include its politics, such as the presence of slavery and poor labor conditions in historic and contemporary sugar production, and political lobbying by the sugar industry. It also addresses negative health aspects: whether sugar is addictive and its role in obesity and other health issues. Such chapters make the case for increased regulation of the sugar industry, as was done in the tobacco and alcohol industries. On this emphasis, Goldstein said "The book is about delight and it's about pain... It's about human existence."

Entries are signed and have a brief bibliography that a reviewer for Choice described as "far from comprehensive." Small black and white illustrations appear throughout, and two sections, spanning 32 pages, contain color images. The book contains two appendixes, the first listing examples of sugar in film and music, and the second notable confectionery museums and pastry shops.

== Release and reception ==
The Oxford Companion to Sugar and Sweets was released in June 2015 to wide praise.

The Companion's coverage of its subject matter was praised by multiple reviewers as comprehensive, and its large size frequently remarked upon. Writing for the library trade magazine Library Journal, Dawn Lowe-Wincentsen described the entries as going into "great depth" and in the magazine Booklist, Rebecca Vnuk complimented the book as providing quality answers as a reference work. In The Times Literary Supplement, Anna Katharina Schaffner praised the book for its insight into not only the subjects, but more broadly how fields of taste, tradition, commerce and more interact. A reviewer for Choice Reviews, L. Goode, described the book as somewhere students could begin research. Susan Jung, reviewing for a magazine of the South China Morning Post, described the scope as "impressive" and typical for an Oxford Companion book.

Several reviewers described the book as "delightful", crediting an abundance of interesting details of history and consumption. Schaffner praised these facts, saying they often "sparkle", but gently criticised the presence of a few obvious facts, such as chewing gum being something chewed but not swallowed. Having praised the book for its comprehensiveness and interesting content, several reviews recommended the text to a wide audience, both popular and academic.

The book's coverage of political and public health aspects of sugar received approval from chef Rozanne Gold, as well as from Schaffner, who found the treatment of such topics so compelling that there could be "no doubt" that the policies advocated for in the text were "urgently needed". By contrast, Paul Levy in The Spectator magazine criticised the emphasis on politics as excessive and one-sided. Levy described the entry on sugarcane by food historian Jessica B. Harris as inappropriately more focused on politics than botany, and noted that entries for "'race', 'plantations', 'slavery' and 'biofuel'" were included but those for white chocolate and Quakers (who were influential figures in the history of the chocolate trade) were not. Levy left other, slight criticisms, but praised the quality of the contributors as "astoundingly high" and described the willingness of Mintz to write such an introduction as "a mighty endorsement of [Goldstein]."

In August 2015, Oxford University Press described the release as a "big success" for the publisher. In March the following year, Library Journal called the Companion the "most popular reference book of the year", and in May, the book was nominated for the James Beard Foundation Award in the category Reference and Scholarship. At the 2016 PROSE Awards, the work received an honorable mention in the category "Single Volume Reference/Humanities & Social Sciences".

== See also ==
- The Oxford Companion to:
  - Beer
  - Food
  - Spirits & Cocktails
  - Wine
- Bibliography of cuisine encyclopedias
