= Peach State (poetry collection) =

2021 poetry collection by Adrienne Su

- Author: Adrienne Su
- Genre: Poetry
- Publisher: University of Pittsburgh Press
- Publication date: 2021
- Pages: 88
- ISBN: 978-0-8229-6656-2

Peach State is a 2021 poetry collection by Adrienne Su, published by the University of Pittsburgh Press as part of the Pitt Poetry Series. The collection was a finalist for the 2022 Patterson Poetry Prize.

== Form ==
The book is centered on food and cooking as a means of reflecting on Chinese American identity in the Southern United States. Set primarily in Atlanta, the poems trace the city's transformation from the mid-twentieth century to the present through restaurants, kitchens, and grocery stores.

Su uses many techniques and forms like sonnets, villanelles, sestinas, ghazals, and a palindrome poem. In Plume Poetry, Su stated that form mirrors "the constant negotiation with tradition that marks both immigrant and Southern experience."

== Critical reception ==
The Georgia Review called the book "enjoyable and formally satisfying," noting the range of techniques and lauding how Su's poems track "the development of Chinese cuisine in this part of the American South."

Gastronomica observed Su's orientation toward "modes, conditions, and moments of transformation" and wrote that she "skillfully navigates the progressions from one form to another, the constants that remain amid the changes."

ArtsATL called it "a love letter to the meals and memories that connect Su to her ancestors, to her parents and her children, to China and to the American South."

The Asian American Writers' Workshop's magazine, The Margins, opined that it provides a glimpse of the Chinese American experience in the American South and observes how the diaspora is both changing and being changed by the region, with food being Su's locus.

Spoon University concluded: "Su's work is an incredible journey that makes you feel both salty and sweet but nonetheless one of the most powerful food poetry collections I have ever read."
