= The Oxford Companion to Spirits & Cocktails =

- Language: English
- Subject: Spirits, cocktails
- Publisher: Oxford University Press
- Publication date: October 2021 (first edition)
- Publication place: United Kingdom
- Media type: Print (hardcover)
- Pages: 864
- ISBN: 9780199311132
- OCLC: 1260690923
- Dewey Decimal: 641.874

The Oxford Companion to Spirits & Cocktails (OCSC) is a book in the series of Oxford Companions published by Oxford University Press. The book provides an alphabetically arranged reference to spirits, cocktails and other elements of the bar industry, compiled and edited by David Wondrich and Noah Rothbaum, with contributions by several writers including Doug Frost, Garrett Oliver and Audrey Saunders. Also notably contributing to the book is pioneering bartender Dale DeGroff. The work is considered the first reference book on the history and trends of distilled spirits.

The reference work includes about 1,150 entries across 864 pages, including 30 preliminaries. Over 150 writers contributed, including bartenders, distillers, historians, spirits journalists, brewers, and anthropologists. Wondrich, a prolific cocktail historian, was previously author of Imbibe! and Punch, and has a Ph.D. in Comparative Literature from New York University. Wondrich took nine years in leading the writing and compiling of the book, having begun in 2012. The book is a relatively new part of the Oxford Companions series, the first book of which was published in 1932. This is due to a larger interest in cocktails and spirits in the 21st century, following Oxford Companions books on wine (published 1994) and on beer (published 2011).

The book's introduction describes why the book was laid out as it is, including a focus on origins, early histories, myths and legends, context and analysis. It stays away from more commonplace facts accessible on Wikipedia.

During the writing process, the book's entries grew; the writers were initially nervous to find enough material, and then became confident; by 2014 the source material became overwhelming. Eventually their compilation was large enough to force the editors to stop; they also limited their scope in several ways, including by omitting reference to anyone who started their career after 2004, at the start of the cocktail renaissance.

== Reception ==
The New York Times reviewed the book in 2021, describing its thorough coverage of "nearly every aspect of its subject matter, from absinthe spoons to maceration to the Zombie". The article relayed that some of the book's entries are "tight" and "witty", including entries on bartenders, remote bars, neglected writers and the like. Nevertheless the Times found some material to be "heavy going", including entries on cryoextraction, water-bath stills and sour mash; a nine-page entry on distillation; and long essays on the world region by region.

Aaron Goldfarb, writing for Epicurious in 2021, claimed the book "will answer every question you've ever had about cocktails".

In 2022, the book won the annual Dartmouth Medal, given by librarians of the Reference and User Services Association (a division of American Library Association), to outstanding reference works.

== See also ==
- The Oxford Companion to:
  - Beer
  - Food
  - Sugar and Sweets
  - Wine
- Bibliography of cuisine encyclopedias
