= Manhattan Brewing Company =

Manhattan Brewing Company may refer to:

- Manhattan Brewing Company of Chicago
- Manhattan Brewing Company of New York
