= Zuppa Romana (dessert) =

German variation of zuppa inglese

Zuppa Romana is a German variation of the Italian dessert zuppa inglese, traditionally made with layers of sponge cake or ladyfingers, pastry cream and other ingredients, and generally associated with the English trifle.

It is made as a rectangular cake that tapers towards the top, giving each slice a trapezoidal shape. The cake consists of three layers soaked in the juice of preserved Amarena cherries mixed with rum. The filling consists of Amarena cherries covered with vanilla pastry cream, while the cake is covered with a thick layer of whipped cream and garnished with candied cherries.

== History ==
Zuppa Romana was first served in 1954 at Café Roma on Maximilianstraße in Munich. The café, which has since closed, was a popular meeting place for Munich's fashionable social scene (Schickeria). As a result, the cake became widely known through reports in the gossip columns of local newspapers.

A recipe for Zuppa Romana was published in the German edition of an Italian cookbook, where it is described as a Biskuit-Schichttorte (transl. "layered sponge cake"); the book notes that the dessert is not a classical Italian preparation and that there are numerous variations. The German edition was not a straightforward translation of the Italian original: Zuppa Romana is absent from the Italian edition, while some recipes present in the Italian edition, including zaleti and zeppole, were omitted from the German one. The German edition therefore documents the dessert in German-language culinary publishing, but does not establish that it was part of the Italian culinary repertoire represented in the original edition.

Today, Zuppa Romana is offered in some cafés and restaurants in Germany, particularly in the Munich region, although it is rarely served in its original form and is more commonly prepared as a round cake with various variations.

== See also ==
- "Zuppa Romana", a 1983 song by the German band Schrott nach 8
