= The Oxford Companion to Beer =

2011 book by Garrett Oliver

- U.S. first edition cover
- Author: Garrett Oliver (editor)
- Language: English
- Subject: Beer
- Publisher: Oxford University Press
- Publication date: October 2011 (first edition)
- Publication place: United States
- Media type: Print (hardcover)
- Pages: 920
- ISBN: 978-0-19-536713-3
- Dewey Decimal: 641.2'3–dc23
- LC Class: TP570.O95

The Oxford Companion to Beer, abbreviated OCB, is a book in the series of Oxford Companions published by Oxford University Press. The book provides an alphabetically arranged reference to beer, compiled and edited by Garrett Oliver with a foreword by U.S. chef Tom Colicchio. Published in 2011, the work draws on 166 contributors from 24 countries to amass over 1,100 entries on beer.

== Reception ==
Eric Asimov of The New York Times described the work as a "mammoth undertaking ... encyclopedic in scope", and that the editor has "captured the blossoming of a global beer culture at a thriving moment".

Critical opinion of the work has also been voiced, with contentions that the OCB perpetuates certain beer history myths, and other omissions published by writers and beer enthusiasts, some of whom OCB contributors themselves. Shortly after publication an unofficial wiki site was launched to "make comments, add annotation, identify errata and suggest further sources to the text of The Oxford Companion to Beer".

== See also ==
- The Oxford Companion to:
  - Food
  - Spirits & Cocktails
  - Sugar and Sweets
  - Wine
- Bibliography of cuisine encyclopedias
