= Jules Guyot =

French physician and agronomist (1807–1872)

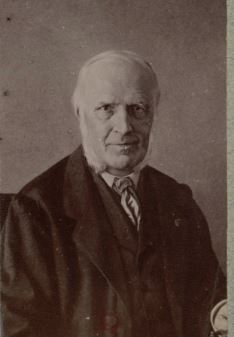
Photograph of Jules Guyot from the Nadar atelier

Jules Guyot (English: /ɡiːˈjoʊ/ ghee-YOH, French: [ʒyl ɡɥijo]; 17 May 1807 – 31 March 1872) was a French physician and agronomist who was born in the commune of Gyé-sur-Seine, in the department of Aube. Guyot studied medicine in Paris, and had an avid interest in mechanics, physics and telegraphy, but he is best known for his work in viticulture.

== Biography ==
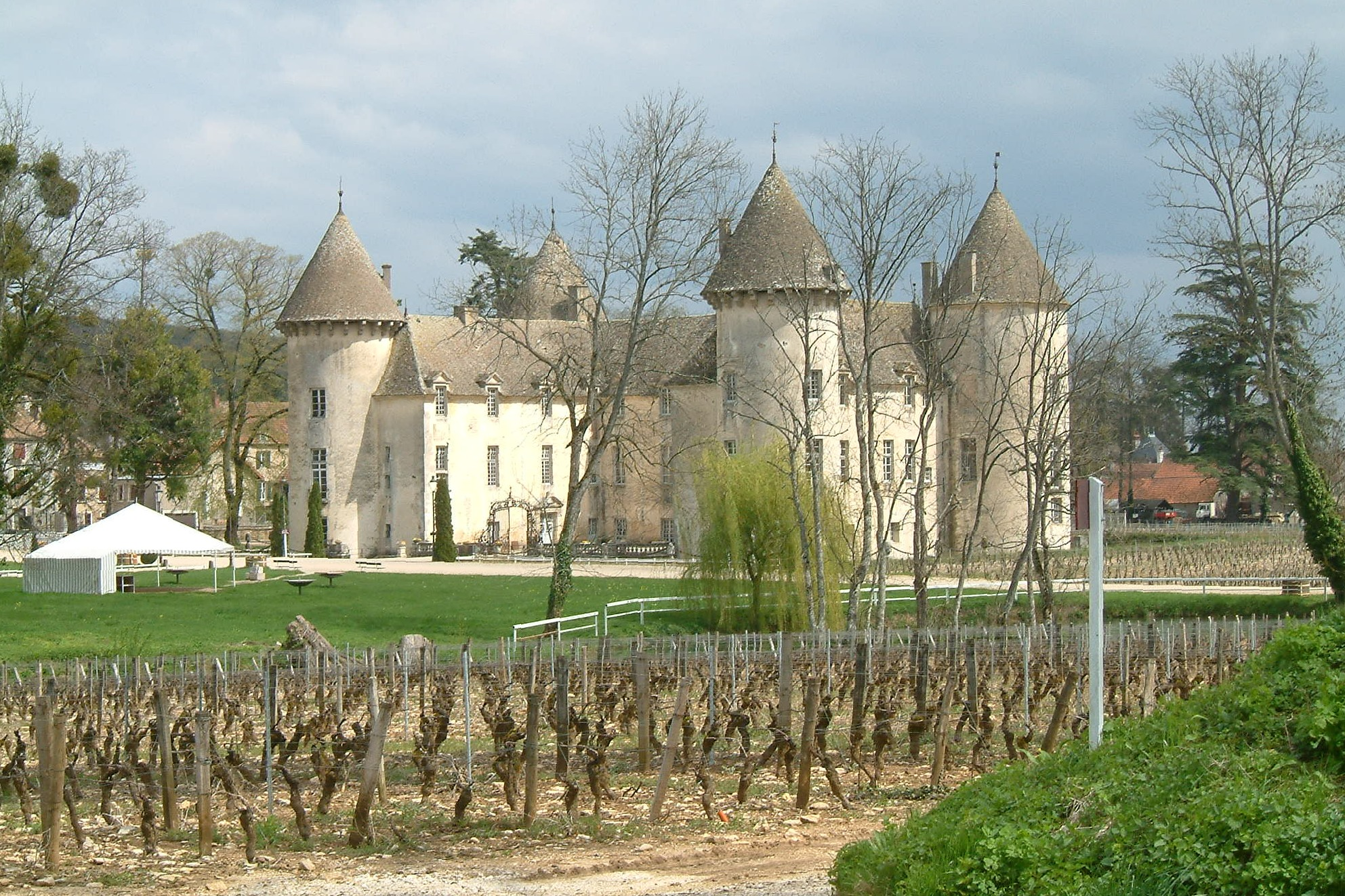
The Château in Savigny-lès-Beaune, where Jules Guyot died in 1872

As a student, Guyot participated in the 1830 July Revolution, and during the unrest in 1831 was jailed in the Sainte-Pélagie Prison. He has a cultivated variety of pear called the Docteur Jules Guyot named after him, and the Institut universitaire de la Vigne et du Vin (aka "Institute Jules Guyot") at the University of Burgundy in Dijon is named in his honor. This institute offers degrees in the study of oenology. He was awarded the Legion d'honeur in 1860 and again in 1867.

== Career ==
Guyot is remembered for making improvements in the cultivation and preparation of grapevines for the production of quality wines. He introduced the "Guyot system" of "cane-pruning" of vines for trellises. The Guyot system is extensively used throughout vineyards in Europe. The terms "single Guyot" and "double Guyot" are used for different techniques in the training of vines.

Among his written works are: Culture de la vigne et vinification, and Étude des vignobles de France, pour servir à l'enseignement mutuel de la viticulture et de la vinification françaises. The latter work concerned Guyot's six-year research (1861–67) of vineyards in 71 departments throughout France.

Guyot died in the castle of Savigny near Beaune.

== Works ==
- Guyot, Jules (1807-1872) Auteur du texte (1876). Étude des vignobles de France : pour servir à l'enseignement mutuel de la viticulture et de la vinification françaises (2e édition) / par le Dr Jules Guyot; notice biographique... par M. P. Coignet,...
