= Vine training =

Horticultural technique

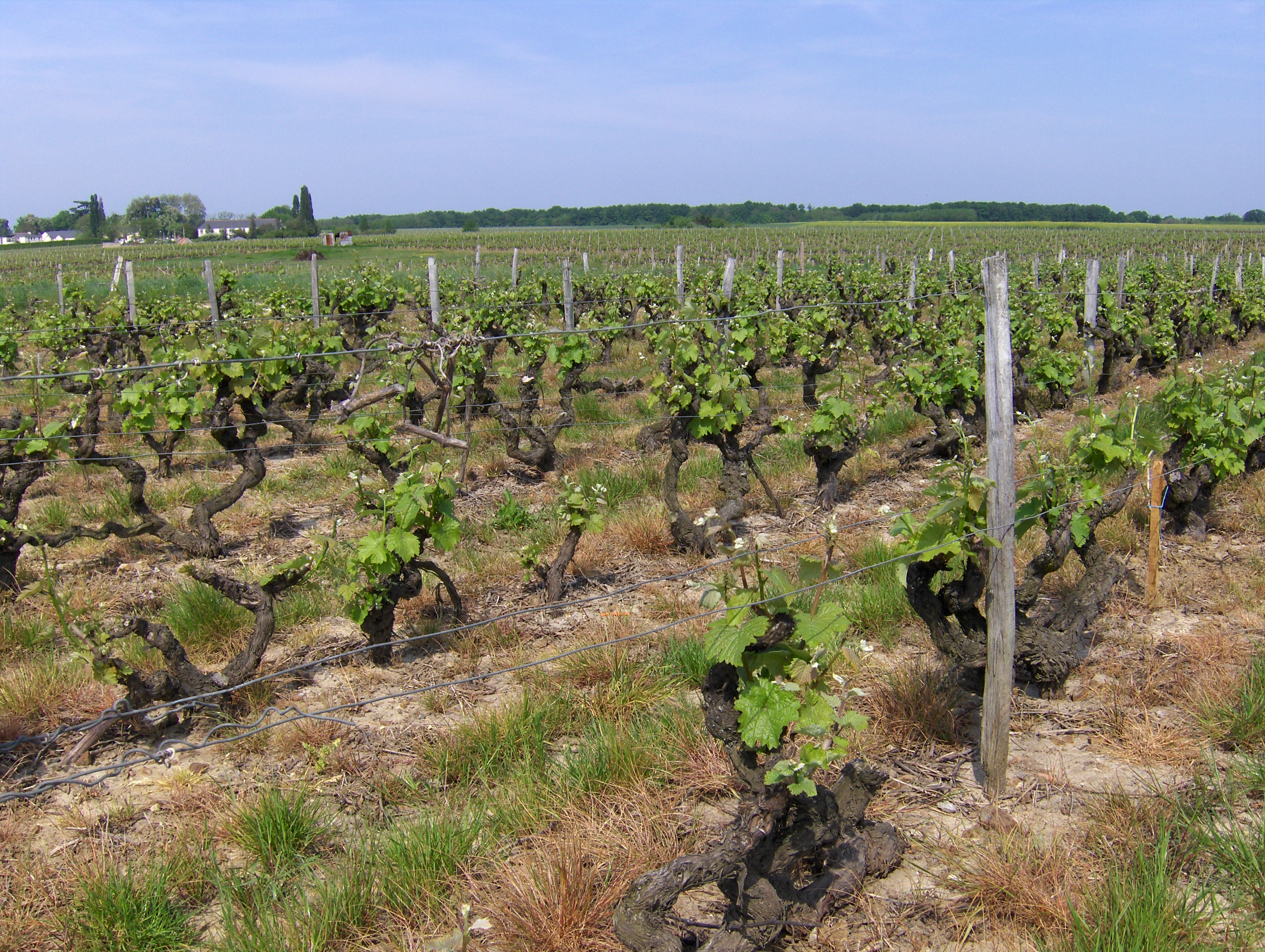
Vines are trained into a variety of styles that aid the growers in managing the canopy and controlling yields.

The use of vine training systems in viticulture is aimed primarily to assist in canopy management with finding the balance in enough foliage to facilitate photosynthesis without excessive shading that could impede grape ripening or promote grape diseases. Additional benefits of utilizing particular training systems could be to control potential yields and to facilitate mechanization of certain vineyard tasks such as pruning, irrigation, applying pesticide or fertilizing sprays as well as harvesting the grapes.

In deciding on what type of vine training system to use, growers also consider the climate conditions of the vineyard where the amount of sunlight, humidity and wind could have a large impact on the exact benefits the training system offers. For instance, while having a large spread out canopy (such as what the Geneva Double Curtain offers) can promote a favorable leaf to fruit ratio for photosynthesis, it offers very little wind protection. In places such as the Châteauneuf-du-Pape, strong prevailing winds called le mistral can take the fruit right off the vine so a more condensed, protective vine training system is desirable for vineyards there.

While closely related, the terms trellising, pruning and vine training are often used interchangeably even though they refer to different things. Technically speaking, the trellis refers to the actual stakes, posts, wires or other structures that the grapevine is attached to. Some vines are allowed to grow free standing without any attachment to a trellising structure. Part of the confusion between trellising and vine training systems stems from the fact that vine training systems will often take on the name of the particular type of trellising involved. Pruning refers to the cutting and shaping of the cordon or "arms" of the grapevine in winter which will determine the number of buds that are allowed to become grape clusters. In some wine regions, such as France, the exact number of buds is outlined by Appellation d'origine contrôlée (AOC) regulations. During the summer growing season, pruning can involve removing young plant shoots or excess bunches of grapes with green harvesting. Vine training systems utilize the practice of trellising and pruning in order to dictate and control a grape vine's canopy which will influence the potential yield of that year's crop as well as the quality of the grapes due to the access of air and sunlight needed for the grapes to ripen fully and for preventing various grape diseases.

== History ==
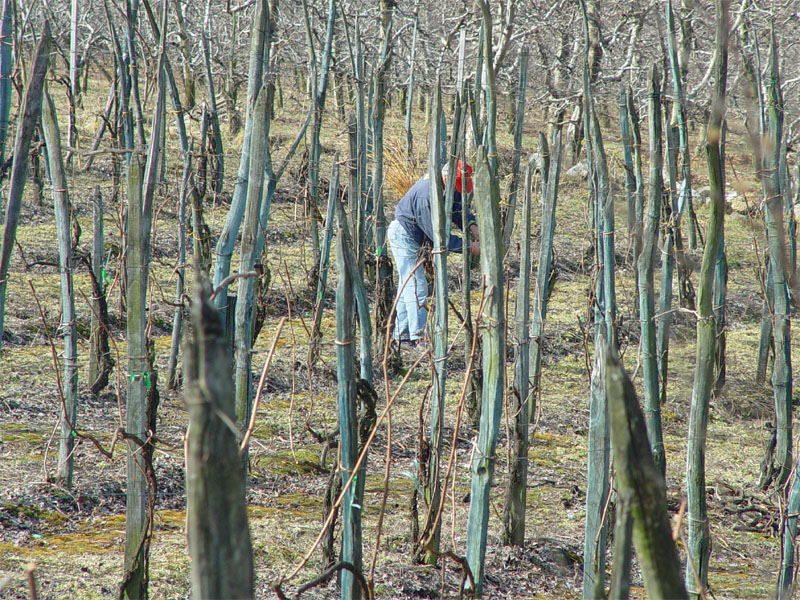
The practice of training vines to individual stakes, as shown here in a vineyard in Valtellina DOC, has been practiced in Italy since at least the time of the ancient Greeks and Romans.

As one of the world's oldest cultivated crops, grapevines have been trained for several millennia. Cultures such as the ancient Egyptians and Phoenicians discovered that different training techniques could promote more abundant and fruitful yields. When the Greeks began to colonize southern Italy in the 8th century BC, they called the land Oenotria, which could be interpreted as "staked" or land of staked vines. In the 1st century AD, Roman writers such as Columella and Pliny the Elder gave advice to vineyard owners about what type of vine trainings worked well for certain vineyards.

Historically, regional tradition largely dictated what type of vine training would be found in a given area. In the early 20th century, many of these traditions were codified into specific wine laws and regulations such as the French AOC system. The widespread study and utilization of various training systems began in the 1960s when many New World wine regions were developing their wine industry. Without the centuries of tradition that influenced Old World winemaking and viticulture, vine growers in areas like California, Washington, Australia and New Zealand conducted large scale research into how particular vine training systems, pruning and canopy management techniques impacted wine quality. As research in this area continued into the 21st century, new vine training systems were developed that could be adapted to the desired wine making style as well as the labor needs and particular mesoclimate of the vineyard.

== Purpose ==
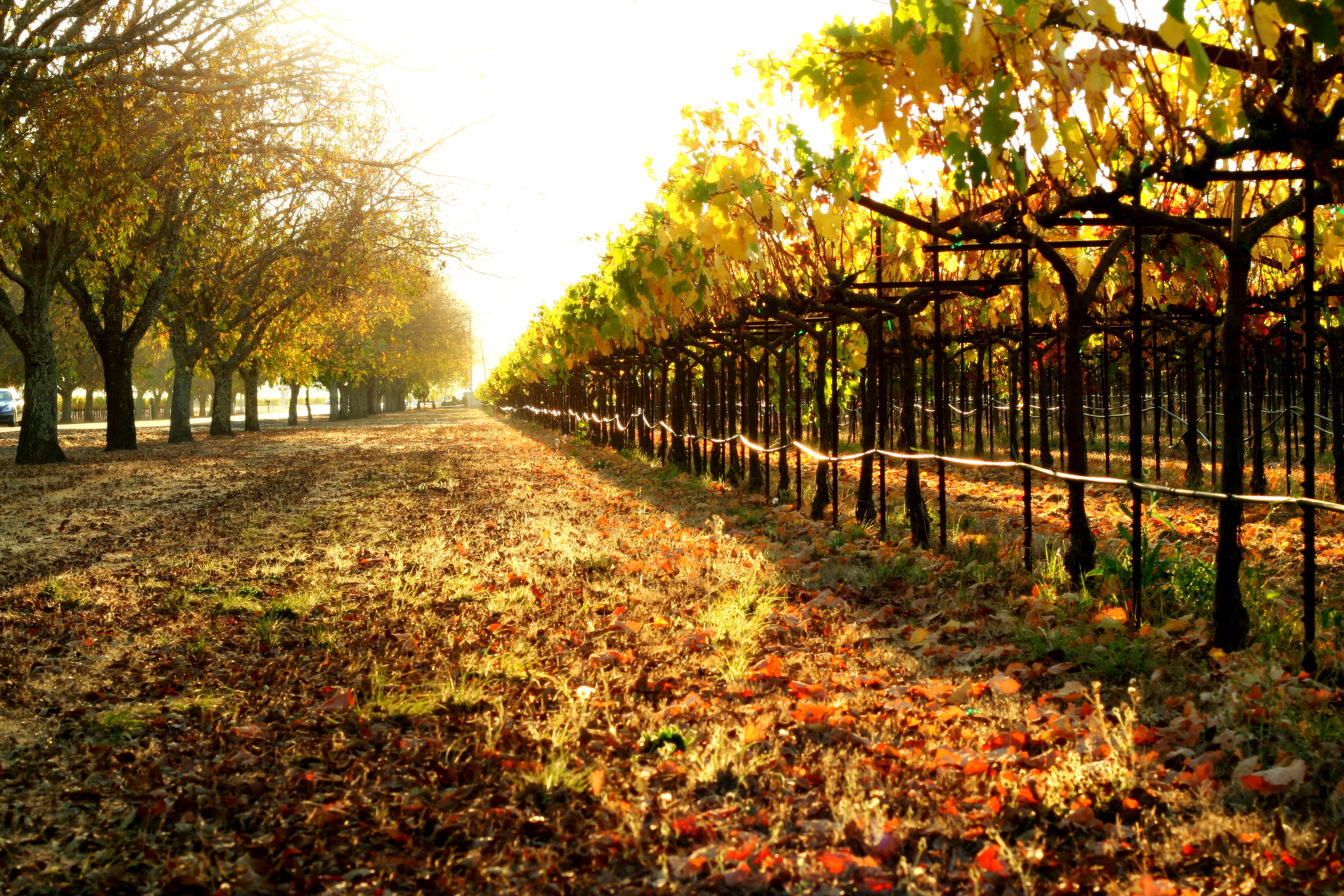
Most vine training systems are designed to ensure adequate sunlight and air circulation throughout the canopy such as these Lyre trained vines in Napa Valley.

While the most pertinent purpose of establishing a vine training system is canopy management, especially dealing with shading, there are many other reasons that come into play. As members of the Vitis family, grapevines are climbing plants that do not have their own natural support like trees. While grapevines have woody trunks, the weight of a vine's leafy canopy and grape clusters will often bring the vine's cordons or "arms" down towards the ground unless it receives some form of support.

In viticulture, growers want to avoid any part of the cordon from touching the ground because of the vine's natural inclination to send out suckers or basal shoots and take root in that area where the cordon is touching the ground. Ever since the phylloxera epidemic of the 19th century, many vines are grafted on phylloxera-resistant rootstock. However, the "top part" of the grafted vine is still very susceptible to the phylloxera, and should a part of that vine take root both the daughter and the original mother vine will risk being infected by the louse. Additionally this daughter vine will leech resources of water and nutrients from the mother vine which can diminish the quality of both vines' grape production.

Other reasons for vine training involve setting up the vineyard and each individual vine canopy for more efficient labor usage or mechanization. Vines that are trained to have their "fruiting zone" of grape clusters at waist to chest height are easier for vineyard workers to harvest without straining their bodies with excessive bending or reaching. Similarly, keeping the fruiting zone in a consistent spot on each vine makes it easier to set up machinery for pruning, spraying and harvesting.

=== The impact of excessive shading ===
Many vine training systems are designed to avoid excessive shading of the fruit by the leafy growth (the "canopy"). While some shading is beneficial, especially in very hot and sunny climates, to prevent heat stress, excessive amounts of shading can have negative impact on grape development. As a photosynthetic plant, grapevines need access to sunlight in order to complete their physiological processes. Through photosynthesis, less than 10% of the full sunlight received by a leaf is converted into energy which makes obstacles such as shading even more detrimental to the plant. Even if the leaves at the top of the canopy are receiving plenty of sunlight, the young buds, grape clusters and leaves below will still experience some negative impact. During the annual growth cycle of the grapevine, excessive shading can reduce the success rate of bud formation, budbreak, fruit set as well as the size and quantity of grape berries on a cluster.

The grape clusters receive some benefit from receiving direct sunlight through enhanced ripening of various phenolic compounds that can contribute to a wine's aroma and quality. In addition to having decreased physiological ripeness, excessive shade will negatively impact a grape's quality by causing increases in the levels of potassium, malic acid and pH in the grapes while decreasing the amount of sugar, tartaric acid and color producing anthocyanins. Beyond a lack of sunlight, excessive shading limits the amount of air circulation that can take place within a vine's canopy. In wet, humid climates poor air circulation can promote the development of various grape diseases such as powdery mildew and grey rot.

== Components of a grapevine ==
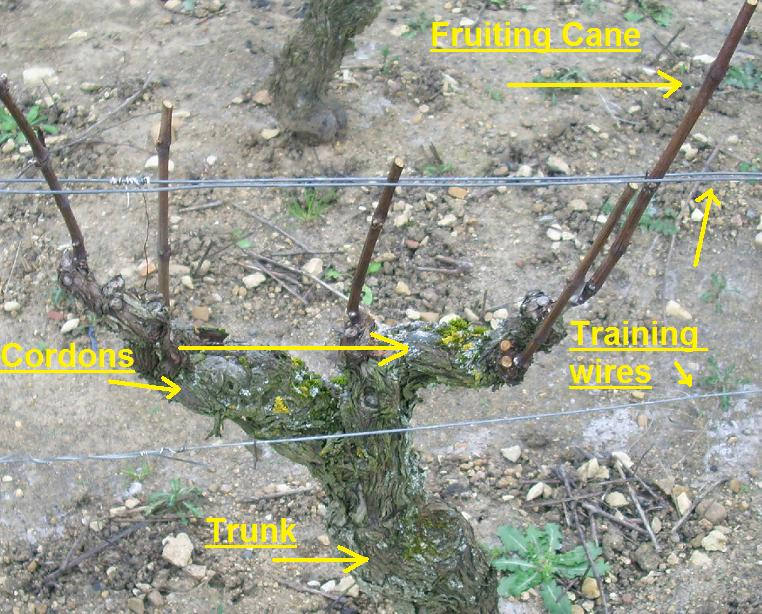
Different components of a grapevine including cordons and fruiting canes

While the term canopy is popularly used to describe the leafy foliage of the vine, the term actually refers to the entire grapevine structure that is above ground. This includes the trunk, cordon, stems, leaves, flowers, and fruit. Most vine training deals primarily with the "woody" structure of the vine-the cordons or "arms" of the vine that extend from the top of the trunk and the fruiting "canes" that extend from the cordon. When the canes are cut back nearly to the base of the cordon, the shortened stub is called a "spur". Grapevines can either be cane trained or spur trained. In cane training, the grapevines are "spur pruned" meaning that in the winter the fruiting canes are pruned essentially down to their spurs with over 90 percent of the previous year's growth (or "brush" as it is known) removed. Examples of cane training systems include the Guyot, Mosel arch and Pendelbogen. Conversely, spur trained vines are "cane pruned" meaning that the individual canes are relatively permanent with only excess buds at the end of the cane being removed.

Cordons are trained in either a unilateral (one arm) or bilateral (two arms) fashion with the latter resembling the letter "T". The cordons of grapevines are most commonly trained horizontally along wires as in the Lyre and Scott Henry systems. However, notable exceptions do exist, such as the "V" and "Y" trellis systems which elevate the cordon to various angles that resemble their namesake letter. Note that vertical trellising systems, such as the VSP system often used in New Zealand, refer to the vertical orientation of the fruit canes in an upward manner and not the cordon "arms" of the vines.

From the cordon, plant shoots emerge from the bud that eventually develops mature bark and becomes the fruiting cane from which grape clusters will emerge. These canes can be positioned and trained to whatever angle is desired by the grower. Typically, they are positioned upwards but they can be bent into an arch such as a Pendelbogen or Mosel arch system, or trained to point downwards such as the Scott Henry and Sylvos system. The latter method requires more labor-intensive trellising and training for Vitis vinifera vines which are naturally more inclined to grow upwards rather than down. In systems such as the Scott Henry, this downward growth is achieved by the use of movable wires that first allow the canes to grow upwards until about 2 to 3 weeks before harvest when they are then shifted downwards where the weight of gravity on the hanging grape clusters helps keep the canes pointing down.

The leafy foliage of a grapevine's canopy will be dependent on the particular grape variety and its propensity for vigorous growth. These leaves emerge from shoots on the fruiting cane in a manner similar to the grape clusters themselves. A vine is described as "vigorous" if it has a propensity to produce many shoots that are outwardly observable as a large, leafy canopy. The ability of the grapevine to support such a large canopy is dependent on the health of its root system and storage of carbohydrates. If a vine does not have a healthy and extensive root system in proportion to its canopy, then it is being overly vigorous with parts of the vine (most notably the grape clusters) suffering due to lack of resources. While it may seem that more foliage would promote increased photosynthesis (and such carbohydrate production), this is not always the case since the leaves near the top of the canopy create excess shading that hinders photosynthesis in the leaves below. One of the objectives of vine training is to create an "open canopy" that allows limited excess leaf growth and allows plenty of sunlight to penetrate the canopy.

== Classification of different systems ==
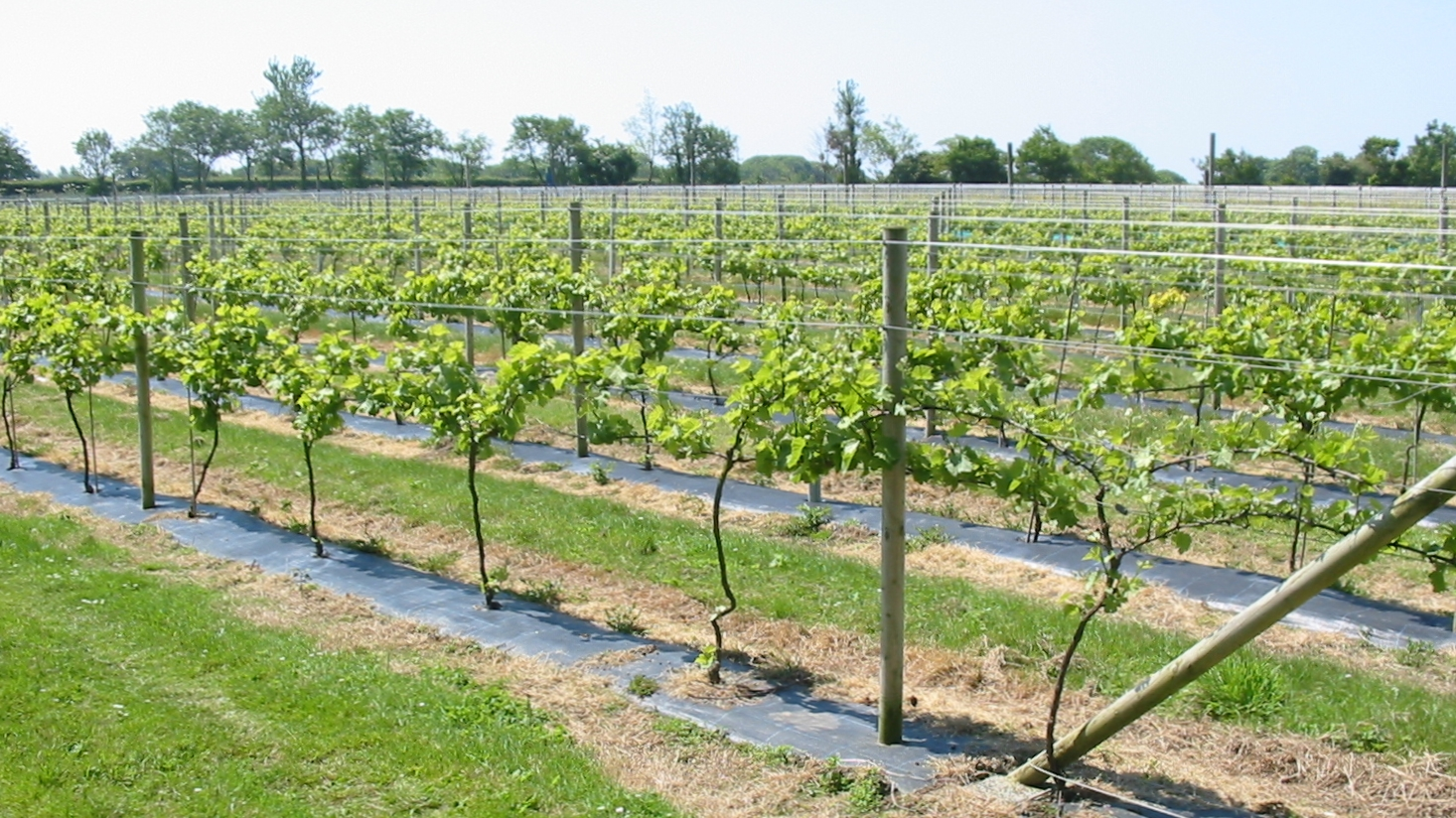
A cane-trained vineyard using vertical trellising similar to the VSP system

Vine training systems can be broadly classified by a number of different measurements. One of the oldest means was based on the relative height of the trunk with the distance of the canopy from the ground being described as high-trained (also known as "high culture" or vignes hautes) or low-trained (vignes basses). The ancient Romans were adherents of the high-trained vine systems with the tendone system of vines trained high over head along a pergola being one example. In the 1950s, Austrian winemaker Lenz Moser advocated the high-culture style of training, recommending low density plantings of vines with trunks 4 ft (1.25 m) high. One of the benefits of a high-trained system is better frost protection versus low-trained systems such as the gobelet training system which tend to hang low to the ground. Some training systems such as the Guyot and cordons can be adapted to both high and low trained styles.

One of the most common manners of classifying vine training systems now is based on which parts of the vines are permanent fixtures which determines which parts of the vine are removed each year as part of the winter pruning. With a cane-trained system, there are no permanent cordons or branches that are kept year after year. The vine is pruned down to the spur in winter, leaving only one strong cane which is then trained into becoming the main branch for next year's crop. Examples of cane trained systems include the Guyot and Pendelbogen. With spur-trained systems, the main branch or cordon is kept each year with only individual canes being pruned during the winter. While vines that are cane trained will often have a thin, smooth main branch, spur trained vines will often have thick, dark and gnarled cordon branches. Many old vine vineyards will often utilize spur training system. Some examples of spur-training systems include the goblet or bush vine systems, and Cordon de Royat. Some systems, like the Scott Henry and VSP Trellis, can be adapted to both spur and cane training. Vine systems that are classified as either cane or spur trained may be alternately described by the way they are pruned in the winter so systems that are described as "cane-trained" will be spur pruned while systems that are "spur-trained" will be cane-pruned.

Within these larger classifications, the vine training system may be further distinguished by the canopy such as whether it is free (like goblet) or constrained by shoot positioning along wires (such as VSP trellising) and whether it includes a single curtain (Guyot) or double (Lyre). For cordon and many other spur trained systems, they could be described as unilateral (utilizing only 1 arm or cordon) or bilateral with both arms extending from the trunk. Two other classifications, based on trellising, are whether or not the vine is "staked" with an external support structure and the number of wires used in the trellising. Vines may be individual staked either permanently, as many vineyards along the bank of the Rhone Valley which are at risk of wind damage, or temporarily as some young vines are to provide extra support. Within a trellis system fruiting canes and young shoots are attached to wires strung out across the rows. The number of wires used (one, two, three) and whether or not they are movable (such as the Scott Henry) will influence the size of the canopy and the yield.

== Common vine training systems ==
Partial list of common vine training systems
| Training system | Other names | Spur or Cane trained | Origins | Regions commonly found | Benefits | Disadvantages | Other notes | Sources |
|---|---|---|---|---|---|---|---|---|
| Alberate | | Spur | Likely ancient, used by the Romans | Italy-particularly rural areas of Tuscany, and Romagna | Easy to maintain, requires minimal pruning | Can produce excessive yields of low quality vine | Ancient technique of allowing vines to grow through trees for support | Oxford |
| Ballerina | | Spur | Victoria, Australia | Australia | | | A variant of the Smart-Dyson involving 1 vertical and 2 transverse curtains of shoots growing from 1 or 2 upwards facing cordons | Oxford |
| Basket Training | | Spur | Santorini, Greece | South Australia regions like Coonawarra and Padthaway | Easy to maintain, requires minimal pruning | Much shading which in wet climates can promote rot and grape diseases | Essentially a minimally pruned version of the bush vine/Gobelet system | Oxford |
| Cassone Padovano | | Cane | Veneto | Veneto | | | A variant of the Sylvos except that the vines are trained horizontally along wires instead of vertically up or down | Oxford |
| Cazenave | | Cane | Italy | Italy | Well suited for fertile vineyard soils | | Italian variant of the Guyot system involving spurs and canes being arranged along a single horizontal cordon | Oxford |
| Chablis | Eventail, Taille de Semur | Spur | Developed in Chablis | Champagne | A self-regulating system for vine spacing, the spurs are allowed to fan out until they encroach on the next vine | If not supported by wires, some arms can fall to the ground | 90% of all Chardonnay plantings in Champagne use this method | Sotheby |
| Chateau Thierry | | Cane | France | France | | | A variant of the Guyot system where a single cane is tied into an arch with a stake support next to its free standing mother vine | Oxford |
| Cordon de Royat | | Spur | Bordeaux | Champagne for Pinot noir & Pinot Meunier | | | Described as a spur trained version of Guyot Simple. Also has a double spur variant | Sotheby |
| Cordon Trained | | Spur | Late 20th century | California and parts of Europe | | | Essentially a spur trained version of the Guyot system that involves using single or bilateral cordons instead of canes | Oxford |
| Duplex | | Cane | California in the 1960s | California and parts of Europe | Allows for easy mechanization | Can produce excessive yields and foliage which may promote grape diseases | A variation of the Geneva Double Curtain | Oxford |
| Fan shape | Ventagli | Spur | Central Europe | Central Europe and Russia | Allows for easy burial during winter frost protection | | Central and Eastern European variation of the Chablis/Eventail system that promotes a larger fanning out of the vine's spurs | Oxford |
| Geneva Double Curtain | | Spur | Developed by Nelson Shaulis in New York State in the 1960s | Found all over the world | Increase protection from frost and ideal for fully mechanized vineyards | Can produce excessive yields | A downward growing, split canopy system | Sotheby |
| Gobelet | Bush vines, head training | Spur | Likely ancient, used by Egyptians and Romans | Mediterranean regions. Examples Beaujolais, Languedoc and Sicily | Suitable for low-vigor vines | | Vines can be supported by stakes or left free standing | Sotheby |
| Guyot | | Cane | Developed by Jules Guyot in 1860s | Found all over the world, especially Burgundy | One of the less complicated and easiest to maintain system that will restrain yields. | | Has a double and simple variant | Sotheby |
| Lenz Moser | "High culture" training or Hochkultur | Spur | Developed by Dr. Lenz Moser III in Austria in 1920s | Used throughout parts of Europe from the mid to late 20th century | Easy to maintain with reduced labor and machinery cost | Can cause excessive shading in the fruit zone with reduced grape quality | Influenced Dr. Shaulis' development of the Geneva Double Curtain | Oxford |
| Lyre | The "U" system | Spur | Developed by Alain Carbonneau in Bordeaux | More common in New World wine regions | Allows good air circulation and sunlight penetration | Not ideally suited for low vigor vines | Can be adapted to cane training systems | Sotheby |
| Mosel arch | | Cane | Mosel | Germany | | | Each vine has its own stake with two canes bent into a heart shape. During the growing season the vines have the appearance of trees | Clarke |
| Pendelbogen | European Loop, Arch-Cane, Capovolto | Cane | Germany | Switzerland, Rhineland, Alsace, Macon, British Columbia and Oregon | Promotes better sap distribution and more fruit bearing shoots especially in the center buds on the cane | Can produce excessive yields and reduce ripeness levels | A variant of the Guyot Double | Sotheby |
| Ruakura Twin Two-Tier | RT2T | Spur | New Zealand | New Zealand | Well suited for high-vigor vineyards by spreading out the canopy | Difficult to mechanize | Similar to the Geneva Double Curtain except that the canopy is spread out over 4 curtains, two on top and two on bottom | Oxford |
| Scott Henry | | Cane and Spur variant | Developed at Henry Estate Winery in Oregon | Oregon, many New World wine regions | Increased fruiting areas and a split canopy that allows more sun penetration, producing less herbaceous wines with smoother tannins | Can produce excessive yields. Very labor-intensive and expensive to set up | Involves growing shoots along movable wires that allows the grower to shift half the canopy into a downwards growing position | Sotheby |
| Smart-Dyson | | Spur | Developed by Australian Richard Smart and American John Dyson | United States, Australia, Chile, Argentina, Spain and Portugal | Often used with organic viticulture due to the very open canopy that limits disease threat or the need for pesticides | | Similar to the Scott Henry except that the cordon is trained with alternating upwards and downward trained spurs creating 2 canopies | Oxford |
| Sylvos | Hanging cane, Sylvoz | Cane | Developed by Carlos Sylvos | Veneto, Australia and New Zealand | Requires much time for pruning, and ability to bend and tie the canes. Easily maintained and mechanized | Produces a good quality yield even in case of high soil fertility | Vines are growing downward from a taller (usually over 1,4 m) trunk | Sotheby |
| Sylvos-Casarsa | Casarsa Friuli | Cane | Friuli-Venezia Giulia | Friuli and Veneto | Similar to the Sylvos | | Similar to Sylvos except that the canes do not need to be tied down after pruning. | Oxford |
| Sylvos-Hawkes Bay | | Spur | Montana Wines adaptation of the Sylvos developed in the 1980s | New Zealand | Creates a more open canopy that allows more air circulation and less prone to bunch rot | Can produce excessive yields and reduce ripeness levels | Combines aspects of the Scott Henry system of alternating upwards and downwards growing shoots with the Sylvos system | Sotheby |
| T Trellis | | Spur | Australia | Australia | Can be mechanized for harvest and pruning | An undivided canopy may promote excessive shading | Utilizes 2 horizontal cordons that together with the vine trunk give the appearance of the letter "T" | Oxford |
| Tatura Trellis | | Spur | Australia | Australia | Two incline canopies meeting at a 60 degree angle in the middle provides for ample air and light penetration | Can produce excessive yields and difficult to mechanize | Only recently in the 21st century has this style been used for commercial viticulture | Oxford |
| Tendone | Parral, Parron, Pergola, Verandah, Latada (in Portuguese) | Spur | Italy | Southern Italy and parts of South America, Portugal | Grapes grown overhead on arbors or pergolas have little risk of falling to the ground or eaten by animals | Expensive to construct and maintain, very dense canopy and potential for grape diseases to develop | More often used for table grape rather than wine production | Oxford |
| V Trellis | | Spur | Australia | Many New World wine regions | | | Similar to the Lyre "U trellis" except that the cordons are separate from the base trunk | Oxford |
| VSP Trellis | Vertical Shoot Positioned Trellis | Cane and Spur variant | Several variants developed independently in Europe and New World wine regions | Cane in New Zealand, spur-trained variant in France and Germany | Well suited for mechanized vineyards and low vigor vines | Can produce excessive yields and shading | Most common system of vine training used in New Zealand | Sotheby |
