= The Oxford Companion to Wine =

2015 book edited by Jancis Robinson

- Fourth edition cover
- Editor: Jancis Robinson
- Language: English
- Subject: Wine
- Publisher: Oxford University Press
- Publication date: September 2015 (fourth edition)
- Publication place: United Kingdom
- Media type: Print (hardcover)
- Pages: 860
- ISBN: 978-0-19-870538-3
- OCLC: 921140648
- Dewey Decimal: 641.2/2 22
- LC Class: TP548 .O76 2015

The Oxford Companion to Wine (OCW) is a book in the series of Oxford Companions published by Oxford University Press. The book provides an alphabetically arranged reference to wine, compiled and edited by Jancis Robinson, with contributions by several wine writers including Hugh Johnson, Michael Broadbent, and James Halliday, and experts such as viticulturist Richard Smart and oenologist Pascal Ribéreau-Gayon.

The contract for the first edition was signed in 1988, and after five years of writing it was published in 1994. The second edition was published in 1999 and the third in 2006. The fourth edition, published in 2015, contains nearly 4,104 entries (300 of them completely new) over about 850 pages with contributions from 187 people. David Williams in The Guardian, wrote that the new edition "offer[s] a snapshot of the more significant changes in wine in the past nine years."

Entries for individuals are limited by the strict criteria of "a long track record" and "global significance"; hence French worldwide consulting oenologist Michel Rolland and even former Soviet leader Mikhail Gorbachev have entries, while California oenologist Helen Turley is omitted. Also, there is no entry for Jancis Robinson herself.

Eric Asimov of The New York Times has noted that with the wine world's increasing rate of evolution, "this encyclopedic work keeps pace with new information on issues like climate change, biodynamic viticulture and globalization, and emerging wine regions like Canada and eastern Europe."

Having received several awards, including the André Simon Memorial Award and the Glenfiddich Award, it has been described as "the most useful wine book ever published," and "the one essential book for any wine-lover". The Strategist included the book in its list of the best wine books.

== See also ==
- The Oxford Companion to:
  - Beer
  - Food
  - Spirits & Cocktails
  - Sugar and Sweets
- Bibliography of cuisine encyclopedias
