= Richard Smart (viticulturalist) =

Australian viticulturist (1945–2025)

- Born: Richard Ernest Smart; 6 March 1945; Windsor, New South Wales, Australia
- Died: 2 July 2025 (aged 80); Victoria, Australia
- Education: Cornell University
- Occupation: Viticulturist
- Scientific career
- Thesis: Implications of the radiation microclimate for productivity of vineyards (1976)
- Doctoral advisor: Nelson Shaulis

Richard Ernest Smart (6 March 1945 – 2 July 2025) was an Australian viticulturist and leading global consultant on viticulture methods, who was often referred to as "the flying vine-doctor". He is considered responsible for revolutionising grape growing due to his work on canopy management techniques.

== Life and career ==
Born at Windsor, New South Wales, on 6 March 1945, Smart graduated from the University of Sydney with an honours degree in agricultural science in 1966. He went on to earn a MSc (Hons) degree from Macquarie University following a study of sunlight use by vineyards, and a PhD from Cornell University in New York state studying under Nelson Shaulis. In 1995, he was awarded a Doctor of Science degree in agriculture by Stellenbosch University, South Africa, in recognition of research into canopy management effects on vineyard yield and quality.

Smart developed the Smart-Dyson Trellis, a modification of the Scott Henry trellis, with curtains trained up and down from the one cordon, along with John Dyson of California.

Smart wrote the book Sunlight into Wine, contributed to several trade publications, and was the viticulture editor of The Oxford Companion to Wine.

Smart died from cancer in Victoria, on 2 July 2025, at the age of 80.

== Global warming changes ==
Smart warned that as a consequence of the ongoing ramifications of global warming, there will be a variety of effects on viticulture, among which that some red grape varieties may lose colour, some wines will lose varietal flavour, and some white varieties may disappear. He also warned of the consequent dangers of vine infestation as temperatures rise, particularly in the case of the glassy-winged sharpshooter, vector of Pierce's Disease, and the aphid Hyalestes obsoletus, which spreads a phytoplasma disease Bois Noir. Higher temperatures mean both insects will be able to survive winters and move further. Hyalestes obsoletus has recently been found in German vines. He also stated that China is set to come to prominence as a wine-producing region as a result of climate change.

== See also ==
- List of wine personalities
