= Brooklyn Brewery =

American brewery

Coordinates: 40°43′18″N 73°57′28″W

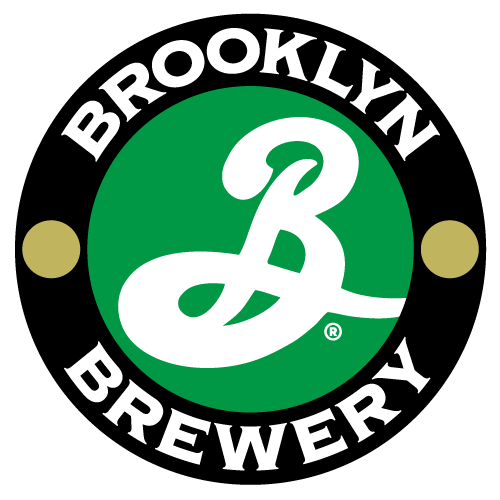

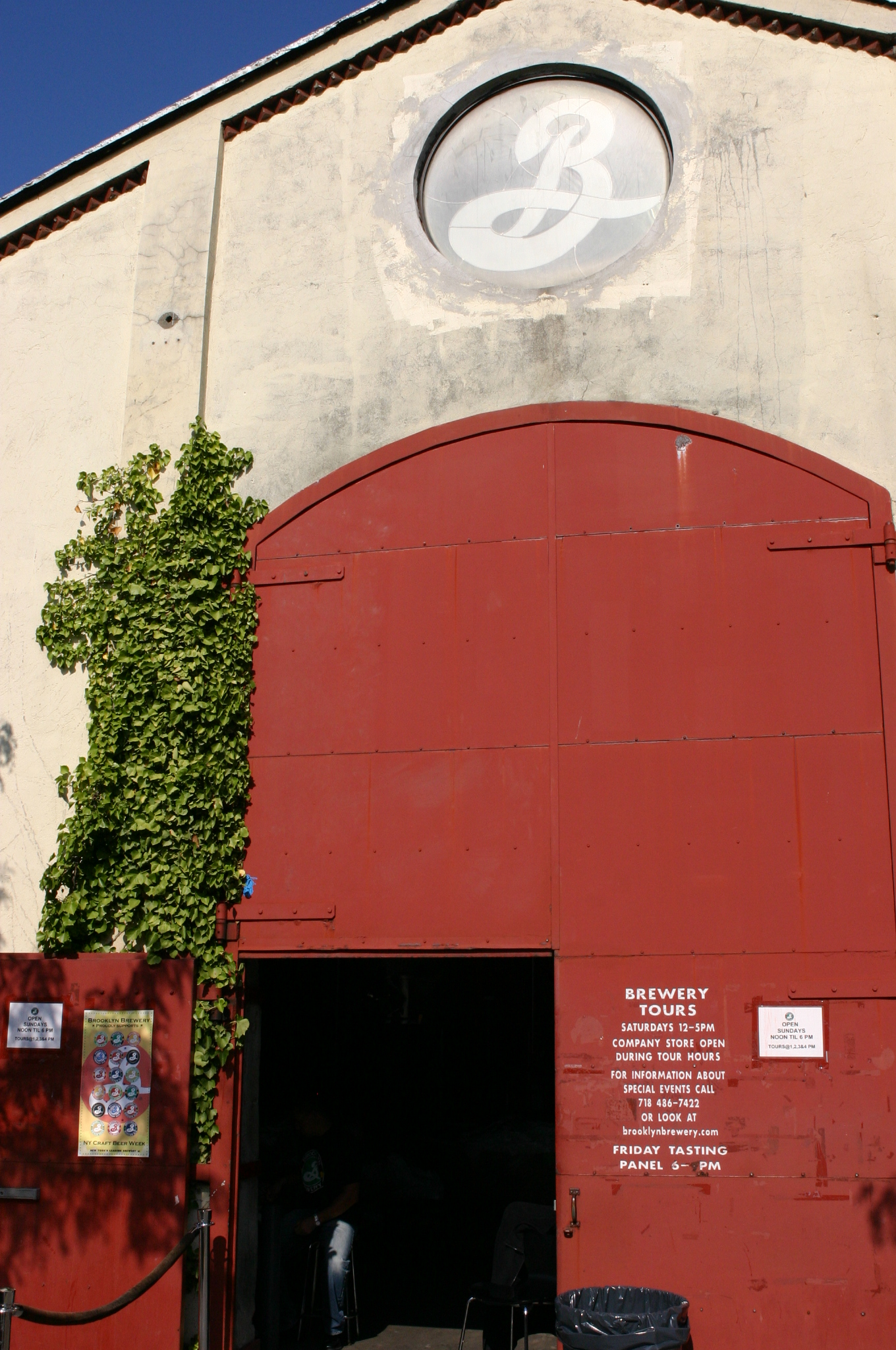
- Interactive map of Brooklyn Brewery
- Location: Brooklyn, New York; U.S.
- Opened: 1988
- Annual production volume: 217,000 US beer barrels (255,000 hL) in 2013
- Website: www.brooklynbrewery.com

Active beers
Name	Type
Brooklyn Lager	Vienna Lager
Brooklyn American Ale	American Pale Ale
Brooklyn Brown Ale	American Brown Ale
East India Pale Ale	India Pale Ale
Brooklyn Pilsner	Pilsner
Brooklyn Defender IPA	India Pale Ale
Hecla Iron Ale	Dark Ale
Brooklyn Blast!	Double IPA
Brooklyn Greenmarket Wheat	Weisse
Scorcher IPA	Session IPA
Brooklyn Brewery 1/2 Ale -	Saison
Local 1	Golden Ale
Local 2	Dark Abbey Ale
Sorachi Ace	Farmhouse Saison
Brooklyn Shackmeister Ale	Bitter
Special Effects 0.4	Low-alcohol beer

Brooklyn Brewery is a brewery in Brooklyn, New York, United States. It was started in 1988 by Steve Hindy and Tom Potter.

== History ==
Hindy learned to brew beer during a six-year stay in various Middle Eastern nations such as Saudi Arabia and Kuwait. Upon his return to his home in Brooklyn in 1984, he and Potter, his downstairs neighbor from Park Slope, quit their jobs and founded the brewery. The pair hired graphic designer Milton Glaser, best known as the creator of the logo for the I Love New York campaign, to create the company logo and identity. Glaser received a share in the company in return.

Originally all their beer was brewed by contract by Matt Brewing Company, and the pair started their own distribution company and personally transported and marketed their beer to bars and retailers around New York City. In 1996, they acquired a former matzo factory in Williamsburg, Brooklyn, and converted it into a functional brewery.

Although the brewery looked to expand its brewing capacity in the City, originally most of the production, including all Brooklyn Lager and all bottled products, were brewed by contract in the city of Utica in upstate New York, due to the limited ability to meet demand at the Williamsburg brewery, its lack of a bottling line, and the cost benefits of contract brewing. The company later sought to expand its facilities in Brooklyn, but had difficulty finding a suitable site within the borough. However, an economic recession allowed them to remain in Williamsburg and undertake a $6.5 million expansion of the brewery in 2009.

Since 1994, Garrett Oliver has been the Brooklyn Brewery brewmaster. He had first been appointed brewmaster at the Manhattan Brewing Company of New York in 1993 where he began brewing professionally as an apprentice in 1989. In 2003 he published the book The Brewmaster's Table: Discovering the Pleasures of Real Beer with Real Food. Garrett has also been a judge at the Great American Beer Festival for eleven years.

In 2016, they announced that they were looking to relocate their specialty brewing operation in Williamsburg after their landlord, Yoel Goldman, put the building up for sale as they would not be able to renew their lease for a reasonable price given escalating real estate prices. They also planned to relocate their main brewery in Utica to a $70 million, 200,000-square-foot facility on Staten Island.

Japanese corporation Kirin acquired a 24.5% stake in the brewery in October 2016.

== Distribution ==
Since December 30, 2016, the Carlsberg Group has an agreement with Brooklyn Brewery to distribute its beers in Europe, the UK, and Hong Kong. Carlsberg has opened a craft brewery in Lithuania to produce Brooklyn Lager under license. Brooklyn Brewery has acquired London Fields Brewery in a joint venture with Carlsberg.

== Marketing ==
The brewery has taken a less conventional approach to marketing and advertising, relying more on word-of-mouth, brand visibility at bars as well as donations to, and sponsorship of, nonprofits including such as the World Cares Center. Organizations sponsored by the brewery include Eat Drink Local Week, Desertfest, the Culinary Institute of America's Hyde Park campus, New York Harbor Restoration, the Brooklyn Museum and The New York Poetry Festival.

== Beer School ==
Beer School: Bottling Success At The Brooklyn Brewery
- Author: Steve Hindy and Tom Potter
- Language: English
- Genre: Business
- Publisher: John Wiley & Sons
- Publication date: September 21, 2005
- Pages: 304
- ISBN: 0471735124

In 2005 Hindy and Potter published Beer School: Bottling Success At The Brooklyn Brewery through John Wiley & Sons. The book is both a guide to entrepreneurship and beer brewing as well as a memoir of the authors' time together while building the Brooklyn Brewery. Beer School goes over topics such as building teams as well as guerrilla marketing and publicity, with each chapter being written around a theme in the brewery's history. The book is told through the perspectives of both Hindy and Potter, and received mostly positive reviews from critics.

== Honors ==
Esquire magazine selected the Brooklyn Lager 16 ounce as one of the "Best Canned Beers to Drink Now" in a February 2012 article.

Examples of Beers Brewed by Brooklyn Brewery
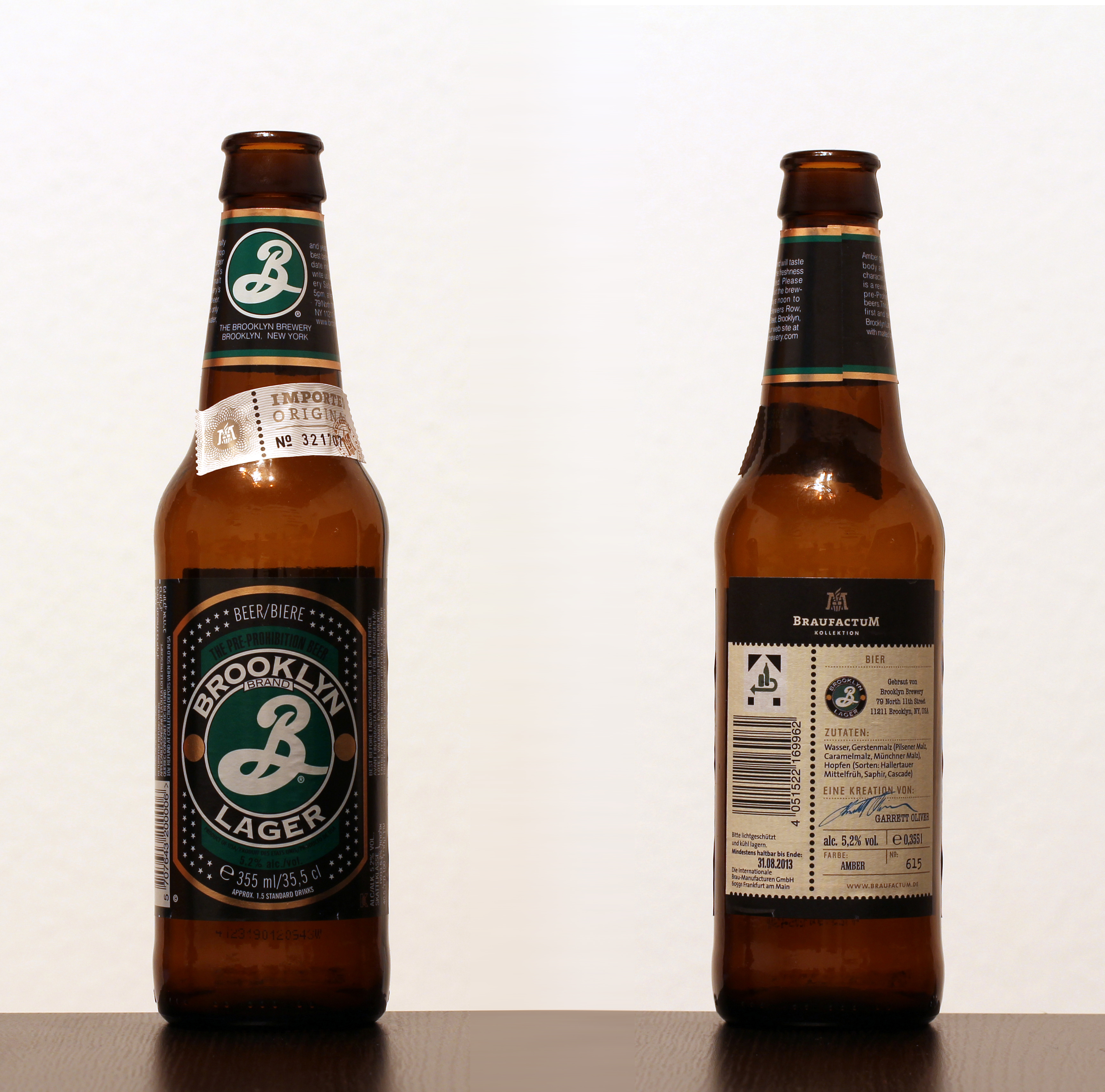
Brooklyn Lager

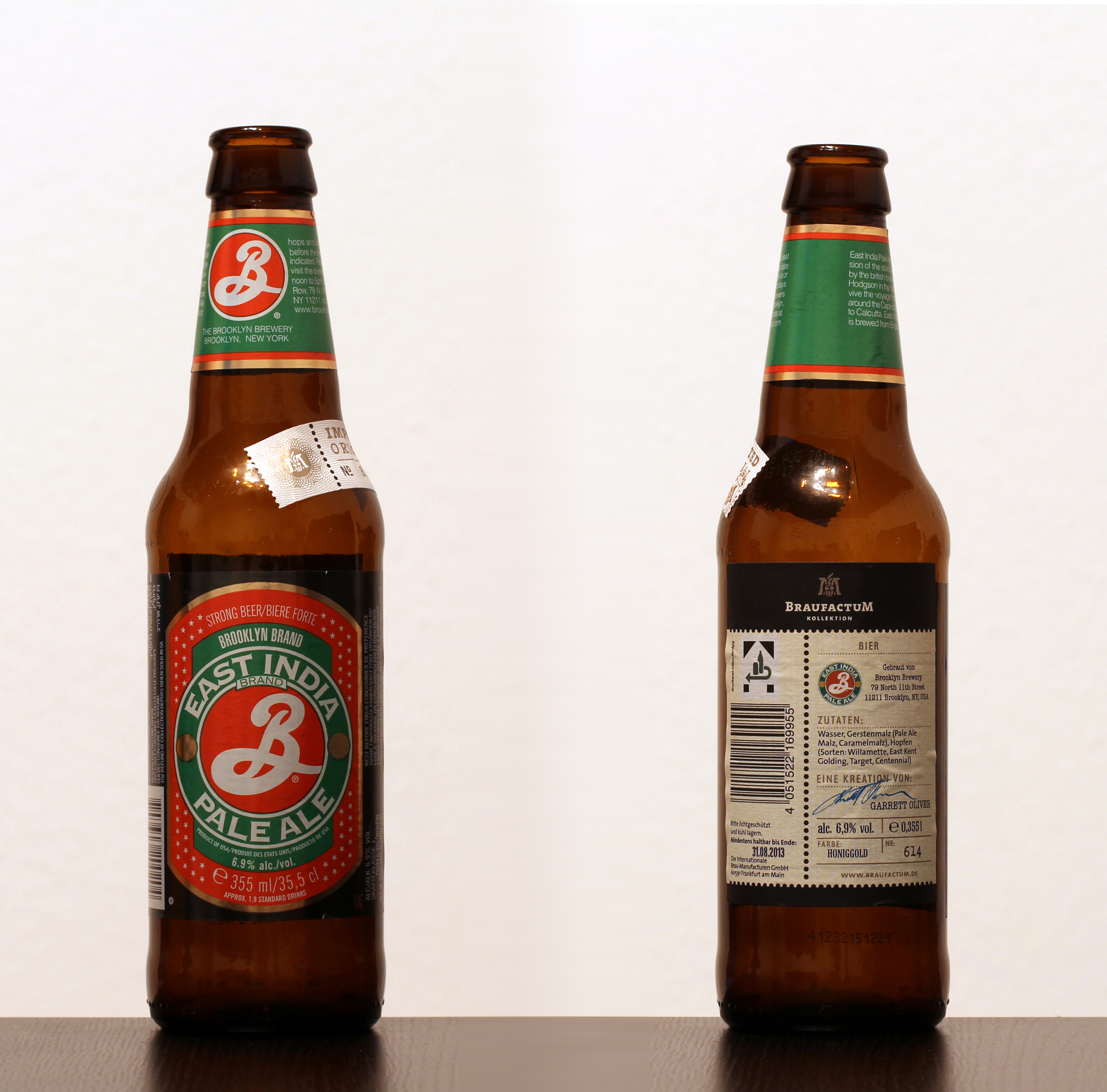
Brooklyn East India Pale Ale

== See also ==
- Beer in the United States
- Barrel-aged beer
