= Tom Potter (brewer) =

Tom Potter is the co-founder and former chairman and CEO of Brooklyn Brewery.

== Early life and career ==
Potter graduated from Yale University and received an MBA from Columbia Business School in 1983.

Potter served as an assistant vice president at Chemical Bank. In 1987, he founded the Brooklyn Brewery along with Steve Hindy. Potter retired from Brooklyn Brewery in 2004. He is currently the co-founder of New York Distilling Company, along with Allen Katz.
