= Alchermes =

Type of Italian liqueur

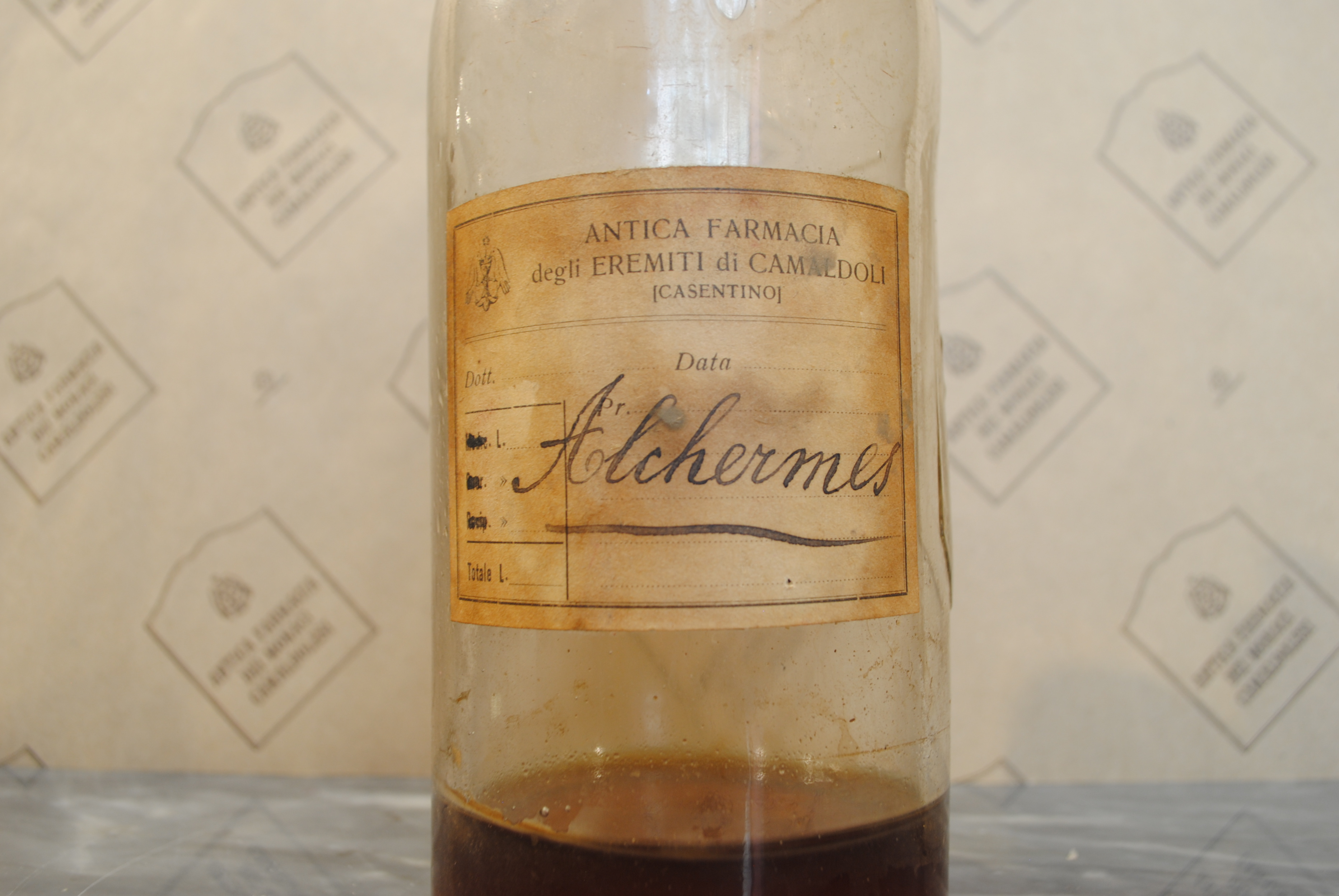
Ancient alchermes bottle

Alchermes (/ælˈkɜːrmiz, -mɪs/, Italian: [alˈkɛrmes]; from the Arabic: القرمز, romanized: al-qirmiz, lit. 'cochineal', from Persian: کرمست, romanized: kermest, lit. 'bloody, red, cochineal, carmine') is a type of Italian liqueur (especially in Tuscany, Emilia-Romagna, and Sicily) prepared by infusing neutral spirits with sugar, cinnamon, cloves, nutmeg, and vanilla, and other herbs and flavoring agents. Its most striking characteristic is its scarlet color, obtained by the addition of Kermes, a small scale insect from which the drink derives its name. Several proprietary variants are commercially available, where the coloring agent is a coal tar-derived dye such as E124 or E126, with alcoholic contents ranging from 21 to 32%. Its chief use is in coloring pastry, although a quick dessert is sometimes made by adding it to custard cream and sugar. In the Italian pudding zuppa inglese, sponge cake or ladyfingers soaked in this liqueur are a major ingredient.

Alkermes was according to Ephraim Chamber's Cyclopaedia (1827), a modification of an 8th-century remedy namely Confectio Alkermes in the "form and consistency of a confection" (an electuary, which is thick and pasty). It was composed of kermes, aloë extract, ground pearls, musk, ambergris, gold leaf, rose water, cinnamon and sugar (sugar being often omitted supposedly) and was said to be produced in Montpellier where the best quality could be found according to Chambers since the main ingredient was "no where found as plentifully as there". Chambers also cited a certain Dr. Quincy for stating the remedy in question was overrated as a cordial (another form of the remedy closer to a liqueur) and should only be considered as a fancy sweetener
