= Zuppa Romana (song) =

Song by Schrott nach 8
- Released: November 1983
- Genre: Schlager
- Length: 3:11
- Label: Ariola
- Songwriters: Rainer Pietsch, Anthony Monn
- Producer: Anthony Monn

"Zuppa Romana" is a song by the German band Schrott nach 8, released as a single in November 1983. The song was written by Rainer Pietsch and Anthony Monn, with Monn also serving as producer. The single was released by Ariola as catalogue number 105 817, with "Das Elefantenlied" on the B-side. It reached No. 27 on the German singles chart and spent ten weeks on the chart.

== Description ==
The song is a light-hearted Schlager built around an intentionally nonsensical list of Italian food and restaurant-related expressions. The lyrics combine names of dishes and drinks such as scampi, calamari, maccheroni, mozzarella, mortadella, amaretto and tortellini with Italian words and phrases, some of them distorted or incorrectly formed.

The deliberate mixture of food names, Italian expressions and nonsense gives the song its comic character.

== Title ==
The title is shared with Zuppa Romana, a dessert documented in the 1987 German edition of Il grande libro della cucina italiana.

== Cover versions ==
In 1984, the Italian comedian and singer Lino Toffolo recorded an Italian adaptation entitled "Pasta e fagioli". The adaptation reverses the comic perspective of the original, presenting Italian stereotypes about Germans on holiday in Italy.

The song was also adapted in Finnish under the title "Nakit ja muusi" by 7 Seinähullua Veljestä and in English under the title "I Speaka Da Lingo" by Black Lace. A Polish version entitled "Zuppa Romana" was recorded by Big Dance in 1996. In 2009, German comedian and presenter Matze Knop released "Numero uno", another adaptation of the song whose lyrics celebrated the footballer Luca Toni, at the time a Bayern Munich player.
