= Garrett Oliver =

American brewer (born 1962)

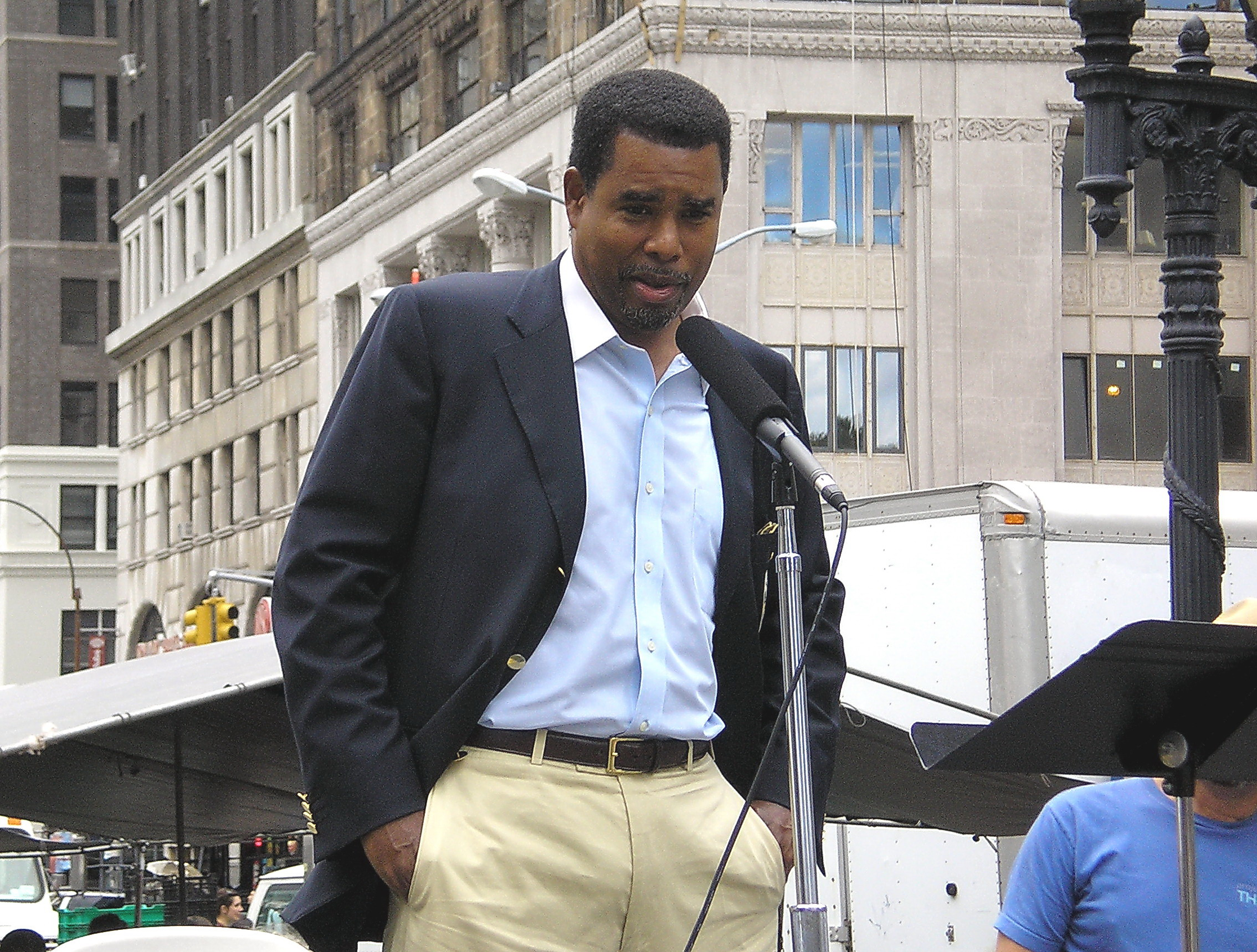
- Born: 29 July 1962 (age 64); Hollis, Queens, U.S.
- Education: Boston University
- Occupations: Brewer, writer
- Employer(s): Manhattan Brewing Company; Brooklyn Brewery

Garrett Oliver (born July 29, 1962) is an American brewer and beer author from New York City. Since 1994, he has worked as the brewmaster at the Brooklyn Brewery.

== Early life ==
Oliver grew up in Hollis, Queens to a father who enjoyed hunting and cooking. Oliver studied filmmaking at Boston University, and as a student organized concerts for bands such as R.E.M., The Ramones, The English Beat, and The Gun Club. After graduation, he spent a year stage-managing bands at the University of London. He then traveled in Europe, sampling beers in countries such as Belgium, West Germany, and Czechoslovakia. After returning to the United States in 1983, he began homebrewing, working for HBO and a New York law firm.

== Brewing career ==
In 1989, Oliver became an apprentice brewer at the Manhattan Brewing Company. In 1993, he was appointed brewmaster of the company, which closed and reopened twice in the early 90s. In 1994, he left Manhattan to become brewmaster at the Brooklyn Brewery, a position he has held since. He has also become a partner in the company.

Oliver has an interest in beer pairing and cooking with beer, having written several books on the subjects, including 2003's The Brewmaster's Table: Discovering the Pleasures of Real Beer with Real Food. This interest has led him to become involved in the Slow Food movement. He was also the editor of the 2011 Oxford Companion to Beer, and has served as a judge at the Great American Beer Festival.

In May 2012 Garrett Oliver was honoured by the Institute of Brewing and Distilling through the Beer Academy as an 'International Beer Champion' and was made an 'Honorary Beer Academy Sommelier'. He was the first (with Bill Taylor) to be given this title from the British organisation that educates and certifies beer sommeliers.

== Bibliography ==
- Acitelli, Tom (2013). The Audacity of Hops: The History of America's Craft Beer Revolution. Chicago: Chicago Review Press. ISBN 9781613743881. OCLC 828193572.
- Del Signore, John (12 October 2011). "The Worst Beer In The World, According To Brooklyn Brewery's Garrett Oliver". Gothamist. Archived from the original on 12 October 2011.
- Schriffen, John; Poppy, Nick; Monroy, Mark (15 February 2013). "Thanks to Garrett Oliver, American Craft Beer Comes of Age". Yahoo! News.
- Smagalski, Carolyn. "Garrett Oliver - Brooklyn Brewmaster of Beer and Food". BellaOnline.com.
