= Manhattan Brewing Company of New York =

Brewery in New York City (1984–1995)

Coordinates: 40°43′24″N 74°00′13″W

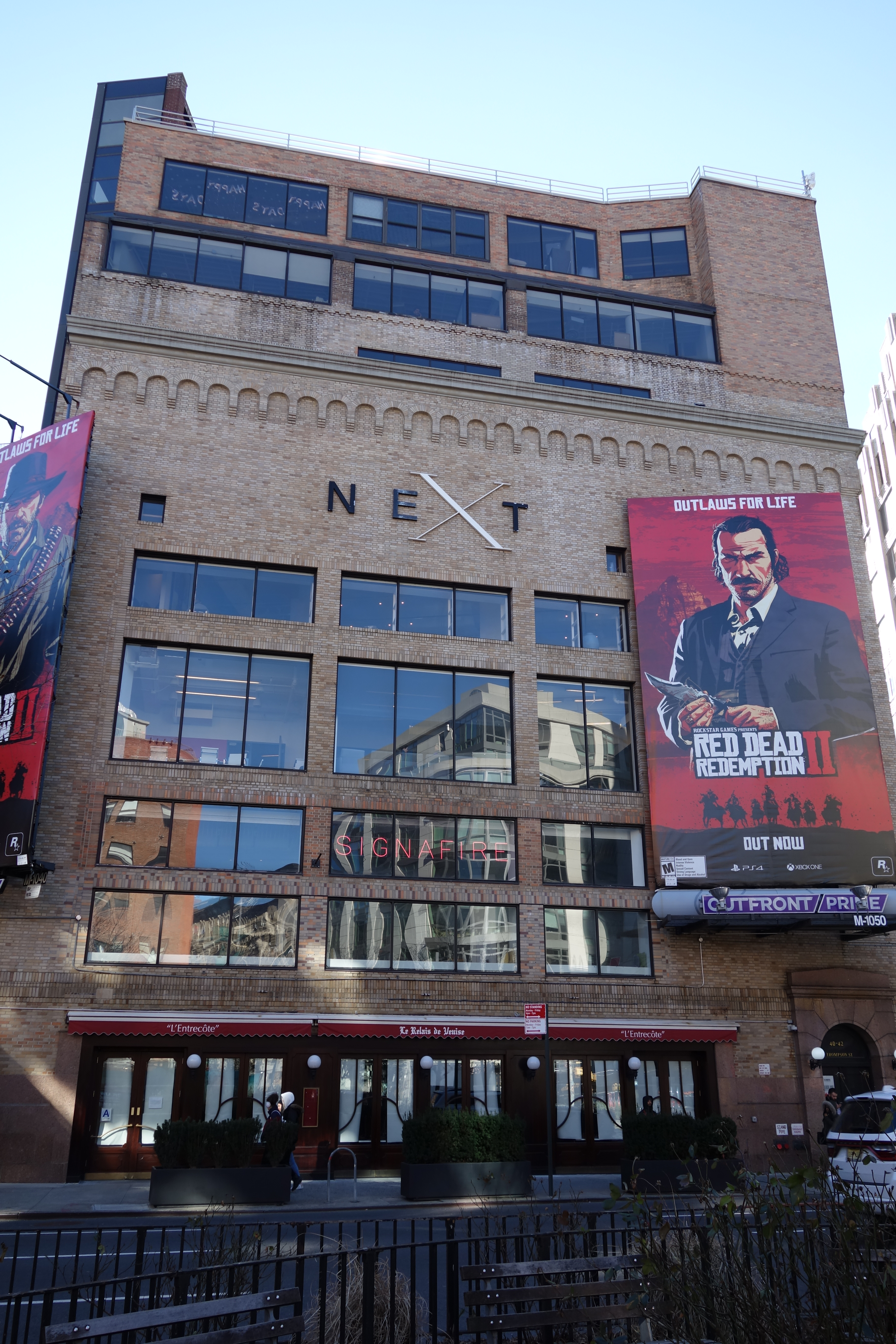
The former location of the brewery in 2019

The Manhattan Brewing Company was one of the earliest brewpub concepts on the East Coast of the United States. Founded by entrepreneurs Richard Wrigley and Robert D'Addona, it was the first working brewery in New York City for decades, starting operations as a large on-premises multi-tap brewpub in 1984. It was located in a former Consolidated Edison substation on the corner of Thompson Street and Broome/Watts streets in SoHo.

The international style ales and beers combined with beer cellar style tables and copper kettles were popular with New Yorkers; distribution was then expanded, via draft horses and antique dray, into the New York marketplace with medal winning brands Manhattan Amber and Manhattan Gold Lager. The business struggled however, with a large overhead, the raising of New York drinking age in 1985 and the Black Monday stock market crash in 1987. The doors finally closed in 1995.

Former Manhattan brewmaster Garrett Oliver, who started working at the Manhattan Brewing Company in 1990, went on to become brewmaster of the Brooklyn Brewery in 1994. During his time at the Manhattan Brewing Company, Oliver established a Masters of Beer Appreciation program, where patrons could earn a "M.B.A." degree by completing three classes covering the history of beer and the brewing process.

== See also ==
- List of defunct breweries in the United States
