= Darra Goldstein =

American writer (born 1951)

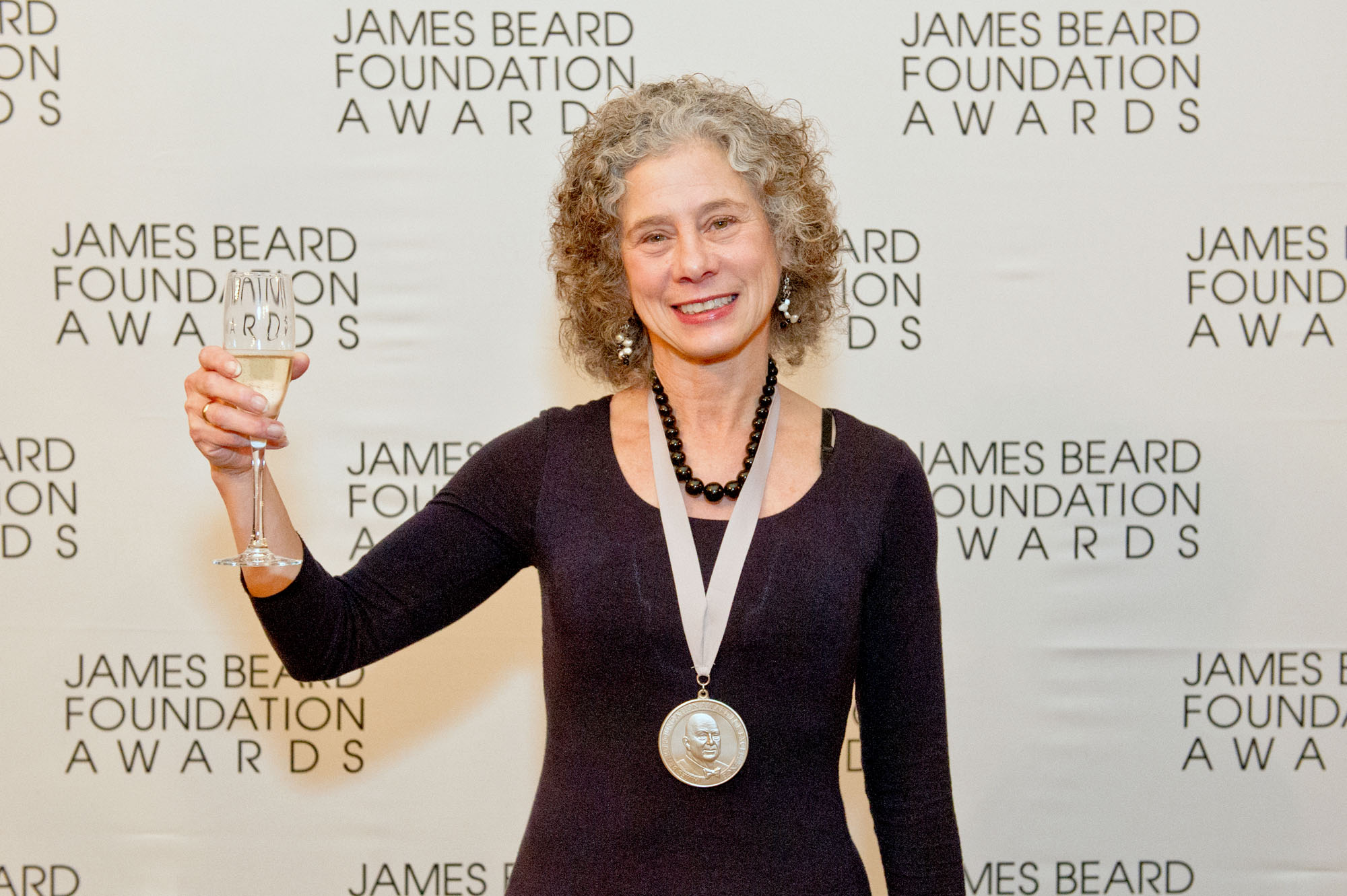
- Born: April 28, 1951 (age 75)
- Education: Vassar College; Stanford University
- Occupations: Cookbook author; Professor of Russian, Emerita, at Williams College
- Spouse: Dean Crawford
- Writing career
- Notable works: Gastronomica; The Georgian Feast; Beyond the North Wind: Russia in Recipes and Lore; The Oxford Companion to Sugar and Sweets
- Notable awards: 2020 IACP Lifetime Achievement Award; 2012 James Beard Award, Best Publication for Gastronomica; 1993 IACP Julia Child Award, Best Cookbook of the Year for The Georgian Feast
- Website: darragoldstein.com

Darra Goldstein (born April 28, 1951) is an American author and food scholar who is the Willcox B. and Harriet M. Adsit Professor of Russian, emerita at Williams College.

She is the founding editor of Gastronomica: The Journal of Food and Culture, which won the 2012 James Beard award for Publication of the Year, and she served as its editor-in-chief from 2001 to 2012. She also served as editor-in-chief of the short-lived magazine CURED from Zero Point Zero Production. Goldstein is the author of six award-winning cookbooks, most recently Beyond the North Wind: Russia in Recipes and Lore, which topped the list of Best Summer Cookbooks 2020 in The New York Times Book Review.

Goldstein is also the founding series editor for California Studies in Food and Culture and from 2002 to 2016 was the food editor for Russian Life magazine. She has served on a number of culinary diplomacy programs including as Cultural Envoy from the U.S. Department of State to the Republic of Georgia (in 2013) and as a consultant on food and diversity for the Council of Europe (from 2002 to 2005) along with other USAID and Council of Europe culinary projects. In 1984–1985, Goldstein was the spokesperson for Stolichnaya Vodka in the United States; later in her career Goldstein also consulted for Firebird restaurant and the famed Russian Tea Room in New York City.

Goldstein has been honored as both a Distinguished Visiting Fellow in Food Studies at the Jackman Humanities Institute, University of Toronto and as a MacGeorge Fellow at the University of Melbourne in Australia. In 2020, she received the Lifetime Achievement Award from the International Association of Culinary Professionals (IACP).

== Personal life and education ==
Goldstein currently resides in Williamstown, Massachusetts, with her husband, Dean Crawford, a writer and professor of English, emeritus at Vassar College. They have one daughter, Leila.

Goldstein grew up in Pittsburgh, Pennsylvania, the middle child of Irving S. and Helen Haft Goldstein. Her father was an organic chemist who specialized in wood and paper science. Goldstein's love of food stems from her mother who, in her words, “loved to cook.” Her mother won numerous cooking contests and was a finalist in the 1968 Pillsbury Bake-Off. Her mother even won a contest sponsored by King Arthur Sardines with a recipe for sardine and cream cheese dip. The prize included a pewter bowl, which Goldstein still has to this day, and a hundred cans of sardines, which Goldstein remembers receiving in care packages while she was a student at Vassar College. There she studied Russian, German and French. She graduated from Vassar in 1973.

Goldstein's interest in Russia traces back to her grandmother (on her mother's side) who was a Russian Jew. Goldstein's grandmother never shared stories about her childhood since Russia was intolerant of Jews at the time, but Goldstein's curiosity about her grandmother's past led her to start studying the Russian language as a freshman at Vassar. After Vassar, Goldstein went on to receive an A.M. and Ph.D. (1976 and 1983, respectively) in Slavic Languages and Literatures from Stanford University. At Stanford, Goldstein proposed writing a dissertation on food in Russian literature, but she was told it was not a serious, academic topic; instead, she wrote on Nikolai Zabolotsky, a Russian poet whom Goldstein describes as “brilliant.”

During graduate school, she was research assistant to Bertram D. Wolfe, a founder of the American Communist Party who by the end of his life had become a senior fellow at Stanford's Hoover Institution. Goldstein took a year off from graduate study in 1978–1979 to work for the USIA in the Soviet Union, touring with the exhibition "Agriculture USA."

== Early career: Russian art, culture and cuisine ==
Goldstein's academic career began in Russian literature with her Stanford Ph.D. dissertation on Zabolotsky, which was later published by Cambridge Studies in Russian Literature as a book entitled Nikolai Zabolotsky: Play for Mortal Stakes. She spent her early academic career studying Russian modernist poetry, and she wrote a number of articles on and gave academic talks about Russian poets and artists such as Zabolotsky and Pavel Filonov.

=== Russian art ===
Goldstein pursued her interest in Russian art after Milo Beach, then chair of the art department at Williams College, encouraged her to apply for a Mellon Grant. After receiving the grant, Goldstein spent a year studying Russian and Soviet art, and then in 1985, she prepared an exhibition for the Williams College Museum of Art called Art for the Masses: Russian Revolutionary Art from the Merrill C. Berman Collection, the first exhibition ever to showcase the work of the important collector Merrill C. Berman. This research also inspired a course she taught for many years at Williams, "Twentieth Century Russian Art and the Birth of Abstraction," which investigated Russian art within a cultural framework and explored the relationship between artistic production and politics.

=== Russian literature and cuisine ===
As Goldstein read Russian literature at Vassar and Stanford, she became interested in how food was used to describe scenes and characters. Throughout her early career, Goldstein's academic research in Russian art and poetry remained separate from her growing interest in food. When she first arrived at Williams College as an assistant professor of Russian in 1983 to teach courses on Russian language and literature, she also published her first cookbook, A La Russe: A Cookbook of Russian Hospitality (reissued as A Taste of Russia), which was nominated for a Tastemaker Award.

== Late career: Food studies ==
Goldstein's second cookbook, The Georgian Feast: The Vibrant Culture and Savory Food of the Republic of Georgia (1993), won the IACP Julia Child Award for Best Cookbook in 1993. The Georgian Feast was an integration of Goldstein's art and culinary interests, drawing its inspiration from Niko Pirosmani, a Georgian artist from the early twentieth century who painted many depictions of Georgian meals. Following the book's positive reception, Goldstein redirected her academic research towards food studies. She developed a new course at Williams, “Feasting and Fasting in Russian History,” which melded her two passions for Russian literature and cuisine. The course integrated close readings of Russian literature with a hands-on approach to Russian cuisine, enabling students to experience the intersection of the scholarly and experiential that Goldstein finds crucial to the study of food.

=== 1990s and 2000s ===
Goldstein's career bourgeoned in the 1990s and 2000s. She founded the acclaimed journal Gastronomica in 2001. She also consulted for the Russian Tea Room, organized several museum exhibitions, and published numerous books and exhibition catalogues.

==== Russian Tea Room ====
Goldstein consulted for the famous Russian Tea Room in New York City in 1999-2000 and for the Firebird Restaurant in 1996.

In a 2010 essay, Goldstein recounts many tasting sessions, including the Kabob Tasting of April 29, 1999, that featured fourteen different kabobs ranging from guinea hen marinated in yogurt, mint, saffron and paprika to sturgeon in a spicy cilantro marinade; five different side sauces accompanied all the kabobs. Goldstein also advised the restaurant team about Russian culture and investigated bakeries around New York City to find one that could produce the dense, dark sourdough bread needed for a Russian meal. Differences occasionally arose between Goldstein and the restaurant's owner, Warner LeRoy, regarding authenticity. For instance, LeRoy was hesitant to list sour cream on the menu because of America's then anti-fat campaign. They compromised by calling sour cream by its Russian name, smetana, which––according to Goldstein––"somehow sounded less fattening."

==== Exhibition curation ====
In partnership with museum curators Goldstein organized several exhibitions, including Graphic Design in the Mechanical Age (1998) and Feeding Desire: Design and the Tools of the Table, 1500-2005, both at the Cooper-Hewitt National Design Museum. Goldstein recalls Feeding Desire as “one of the most wonderful projects I’ve ever worked on.” In particular, she was enthralled by the silver place settings by Claude Lalanne; each piece was cast from a different form in nature: flowers, bumblebees, caterpillars.

==== Cookbooks ====
During this time, Goldstein wrote two cookbooks, The Vegetarian Hearth (1996, reissued as The Winter Vegetarian in 2000) and Baking Boot Camp (2007). She also consulted for the Council of Europe as part of an international group exploring ways in which food can be used to promote tolerance and diversity, serving as editor of Culinary Cultures of Europe: Identity, Diversity and Dialogue (2005). Goldstein believes that “food can be a wonderful tool to promote understanding, but too often it’s used divisively, as a source of conflict instead of sharing.” In 2008, she went to Israel to see whether recognition of common foodways could lessen the divide between Israeli Arabs and Jews, but political tensions and issues of culinary appropriation of dishes like hummus worked against reconciliation.

=== 2010s and 2020s ===
With the growing visibility of Gastronomica, Goldstein rose to become a prominent voice in food studies while continuing to publish cookbooks and teach at Williams College. In 2013, she was named Distinguished Visiting Fellow in Food Studies at the Jackman Humanities Institute, University of Toronto. In the fall of 2016, Goldstein was named a Macgeorge Fellow at the University of Melbourne in Australia.

In the spring of 2017, Goldstein retired from her professorship at Williams College, becoming the Willcox B. and Harriet M. Adsit Professor of Russian, emerita. At the 2017 Williams College Commencement, President Adam Falk said the following of Goldstein: "You introduced students to the language, literature, and intellectual history of Russia, providing many of them a rich, immersive experience of post-Soviet Georgia. And at the same time, you turned your lifelong passion for food into a glorious, multi-course feast. More than mere fuel, food, you have shown, both conveys and develops culture as much as do art, literature, and music."

==== CURED Magazine ====
In the fall of 2016, Goldstein launched CURED, a biannual magazine from Zero Point Zero Production; CURED, according to Goldstein, was the first periodical to explore how age-old methods like salting, pickling, and fermenting inform the way we think about and consume food today.

==== Cookbooks ====
Goldstein broadened her scholarship by publishing Fire and Ice (2015), a cookbook of classic Nordic home cooking that was nominated for awards in 2016 by both the IACP and the James Beard Foundation.

Also in 2015, Goldstein published the 900-page The Oxford Companion to Sugar and Sweets, for which she served as editor-in-chief. With nearly 600 entries contributed by 265 writers from across the globe, the volume explores the long history of sugar, ranging from sugar's dark past in slavery to its use in medical studies to candies found around the world. It also received a James Beard Foundation nomination. In one interview about the Companion, Goldstein mentioned her favorite sweets: Life Savers, fruit jellies, and—at the top of her list—marzipan.

In 2020, Goldstein published Beyond the North Wind: Russia in Recipes and Lore, a cookbook that explores the "true heart of Russian food"––home cooking from pickles to preserves, infused vodka to hand pies. The cookbook was named on many Best of 2020 lists, including lists from The New York Times, The Washington Post, and Esquire Magazine. Goldstein articulates the cookbook's aim as follows: "I wanted to immerse myself in the Russian land and remember and reflect on what it gave to people. This is a place with a short growing season and long winter, but there are absolute riches in the waters. There are mushrooms and berries with flavors we can’t even begin to imagine because ours don’t get that same midnight sun. I wanted to go back to elemental foods and connect with the land."

=== Gastronomica: The Journal of Food and Culture ===
Goldstein credits an article she published in 1995 as the impetus for creating Gastronomica. This article, "Russia, Carême, and the Culinary Arts," discussed the great French pastry chef Antoine Carême's pièces montées or sugar sculptures in the context of the architectural drawings he made for monuments in St. Petersburg, Russia. In a 2020 interview, Goldstein said this article remains one of her favorite pieces she's ever written. At the time, she was dismayed that her highly interdisciplinary research would reach such a small audience after its publication in the scholarly Slavonic and Eastern European Review.

Wanting to create a platform for academics and food writers to come together and help legitimize the budding field of food studies, Goldstein approached the University of California Press about the creation of a new food studies journal. The first issue of Gastronomica appeared in 2001, and Goldstein served as the magazine's founding editor and editor-in-chief from 2001 to 2012. The journal embraced the artistic and the academic, attracting a diverse following from home cooks to professional chefs to food historians. In addition to publishing scholarly articles, Goldstein used prose, poetry, photography and painting to address a wide range of topics in food studies, including pressing societal issues such as poverty and nutrition.

Food celebrities praised the journal Goldstein created. Chef Dan Barber said of Gastronomica: “Darra created a new forum for all the different ways of thinking about food––a literary agora for foodies, intellectuals, artists and Americana enthusiasts.” Mitchell Davis of the James Beard Foundation hailed Gastronomica as “a New Yorker for foodies.”

For many, Gastronomica is best known for its covers where Goldstein blended her passions for art and food. Each issue was interspersed with edgy artwork and photography with a cover that was, in Goldstein's words, designed to be “unexpected and intellectual.” The cover from her last issue as editor-in-chief in November 2012 was only partly tongue in cheek: a close-up of a human skull covered in rainbow sprinkles set against a blue gradient backdrop, alluding to a Mexican sugar skull for the Day of the Dead.

Goldstein stepped down as editor-in-chief of Gastronomica at the end of 2012 when the University of California Press decided to cut its production budget. Because of her dedication to high-quality art in the journal, Goldstein decided to move on with the change in the budget. Upon her exit, Goldstein noted in a University of California Press interview: “I think Gastronomica’s greatest achievement has been to bridge the divide between academics and the food world, on the one hand bringing serious writing to the general public and on the other bringing a sense of aesthetics to the world of academic writing.”

== Books ==
- The Kingdom of Rye: University of California Press, May 2022.
- Beyond the North Wind: Russia in Recipes and Lore. Berkeley: Ten Speed Press, February 2020.
- Fire and Ice: Classic Nordic Cooking. Berkeley: Ten Speed Press, October 2015.
- The Oxford Companion to Sugar and Sweets. (editor-in-chief). New York: Oxford UP, May 2015.
- High Society Dinners: Dining in Tsarist Russia by Yuri Lotman and Elena Pogosian. Translated by Marian Schwartz; edited and with an introduction by Darra Goldstein. Totnes, Devon: Prospect Books, 2014.
- The Gastronomica Reader (editor). Berkeley: University of California Press, 2010 (named Best Food Literature Book, Gourmand World Cookbook Awards, 2010).
- Baking Boot Camp: Five Days of Basic Training at The Culinary Institute of America (with The Culinary Institute of America). Hoboken, NJ: John Wiley & Sons, 2007. (nominated for an IACP award, 2008)
- Feeding Desire: Design and the Tools of the Table, 1500-2005 (with Sarah Coffin and Ellen Lupton). New York: Cooper-Hewitt, National Design Museum and Paris: Assouline, 2006.
- Culinary Cultures of Europe: Identity, Diversity and Dialogue (Editor, with Kathrin Merkle). Strasbourg: Council of Europe Publishing, 2005.
- The World Opened Wide: 20th-Century Russian Women Artists From the Collection of Thomas P. Whitney (Editor, with Jill Meredith). Amherst, MA: Mead Art Museum, 2001.
- Graphic Design in the Mechanical Age (with Deborah Rothschild and Ellen Lupton). New Haven: Yale University Press, 1998.
- The Vegetarian Hearth: Recipes and Reflections for the Cold Season. New York: HarperCollins, 1996. Reissued as The Winter Vegetarian, New York: HarperCollins, 2000.
- Nikolai Zabolotsky: Play for Mortal Stakes (Cambridge Studies in Russian Literature). Cambridge: Cambridge University Press, 1993.
- The Georgian Feast: The Vibrant Culture and Savory Food of the Republic of Georgia. New York: HarperCollins, 1993 (awarded the IACP Julia Child Award for Best Cookbook of the Year 1993, and also Best International Cookbook). Reprinted by The University of California Press, 1999; revised edition 2013.
- A la Russe: A Cookbook of Russian Hospitality. New York: Random House, 1983 (nominated for the Tastemaker Award, 1983); reissued as A Taste of Russia. London: Robert Hale Ltd., 1985, and New York: HarperCollins, 1991. 2nd, revised edition, Montpelier: RIS Publications, 1999; 30th anniversary edition 2013.
- Russian Houses (with Elizabeth Gaynor and Kari Haavisto). New York: Stewart, Tabori & Chang, 1991.
- Art for the Masses. Williamstown: Williams College Museum of Art, 1985.
- All About Love (a collection of thirty short stories translated from the Russian, Vse o liubvi by Teffi). Ann Arbor: Ardis Publishers, 1985.

== Awards ==
- IACP Lifetime Achievement Award, 2020.
- IACP Best International Cookbook nomination, for Fire and Ice, 2016.
- James Beard Award nomination for Best Photography, for Fire and Ice, 2016.
- James Beard Award nomination for Best Reference Book, for The Oxford Companion to Sugar and Sweets, 2016.
- Honorable mention, AAP/PSP PROSE award (American Publishers Awards for Professional and Scholarly Excellence) in the "Single Volume Reference/Humanities & Social Sciences" category, for The Oxford Companion to Sugar and Sweets, 2016.
- Publication of the Year, James Beard Foundation, for Gastronomica, 2012.
- Best Food Magazine in the World, Gourmand World Cookbook Awards, Paris, for Gastronomica, 2011.
- UTNE Independent Press Nomination for Social/Cultural Coverage, for Gastronomica, 2011.
- Best Food Literature Book, Gourmand World Cookbook Awards, for The Gastronomica Reader, 2010.
- AAP/PSP PROSE award (American Publishers Awards for Professional and Scholarly Excellence) for Best Design in Print (Journals Category), for Gastronomica, 2009.
- UTNE Independent Press Nomination for Social/Cultural Coverage and for Best Writing, for Gastronomica, 2009.
- Nominee, IACP award for best cookbook, compilations category, 2008 (for Baking Boot Camp)
- Saveur 100, for Gastronomica, 2008.
- UTNE Independent Press Award for Social/Cultural Coverage, for Gastronomica, 2007.
- Honorable Mention for Outstanding Exhibition Catalogue of 2006 for Feeding Desire: Design and the Tools of the Table, 1500-2005, American Association of Art Museum Curators, 2007.
- UTNE Independent Press Nomination for Social/Cultural Coverage, for Gastronomica, 2005.
- Prix d’Argent for Culinary Cultures of Europe, Gourmet Voice World Food Media Festival, 2006.
- Best Culinary History Book, Gourmand World Cookbook Awards, for Culinary Cultures of Europe, 2005.
- Prix d’Or for Gastronomica, Gourmet Voice World Food Media Festival, 2004.
- Finalist, M.F.K. Fisher Award, Les Dames d’Escoffier. 2002.
- Jacob's Creek World Food Media Awards. Bronze medal, “Best Food Magazine” (for Gastronomica: The Journal of Food and Culture). 2001.
- Sophie Coe Subsidiary Prize in Food History, the Oxford Symposium on Food History (for "Is Hay Only for Horses? Highlights of Russian Vegetarianism at the Turn of the Century"). 1997.
- IACP Julia Child Award for Best Cookbook of the Year 1993 (for The Georgian Feast). Also awarded Best International Cookbook. 1994.
