= Gastronomica =

Academic journal on food history and politics

- Discipline: Food
- Language: English

Publication details
- Publisher: University of California Press (United States)
- Frequency: Quarterly

Standard abbreviations
- ISO 4: Gastronomica
- NLM: Gastronomica (Berkeley Calif)

Indexing
- ISSN: 1529-3262 (print); 1533-8622 (web)
- LCCN: 00211740
- JSTOR: gastronomica
- OCLC no.: 845215046

Links
- Journal homepage

Gastronomica: The Journal of Food and Culture is a peer-reviewed interdisciplinary academic journal with a focus on food. It is published by the University of California Press. It was founded by Darra Goldstein in 2001; she remained until after the publication of the Fall 2012 edition. Contributors have included chef Rick Stein, food scientist Harold McGee and food writer Alicia Ríos.

The journal covers food history, reviews and food politics, as well as poetry and analysis. A 2016 profile of Goldstein in T magazine described Gastronomica as being "trendy", with an "academic bent".

== Awards ==
The journal has received a number of accolades:

- Prix d'Or at the Gourmet Voice World Media Festival in 2004
- 2007 Utne Independent Press Award for Social/Cultural Coverage
- Best Food Magazine in the World at the 2011 Gourmand Awards in Paris
- Co-winner of the 2012 James Beard Foundation Award for Best Publication of the Year.
