= Zuppa inglese =

Italian dessert

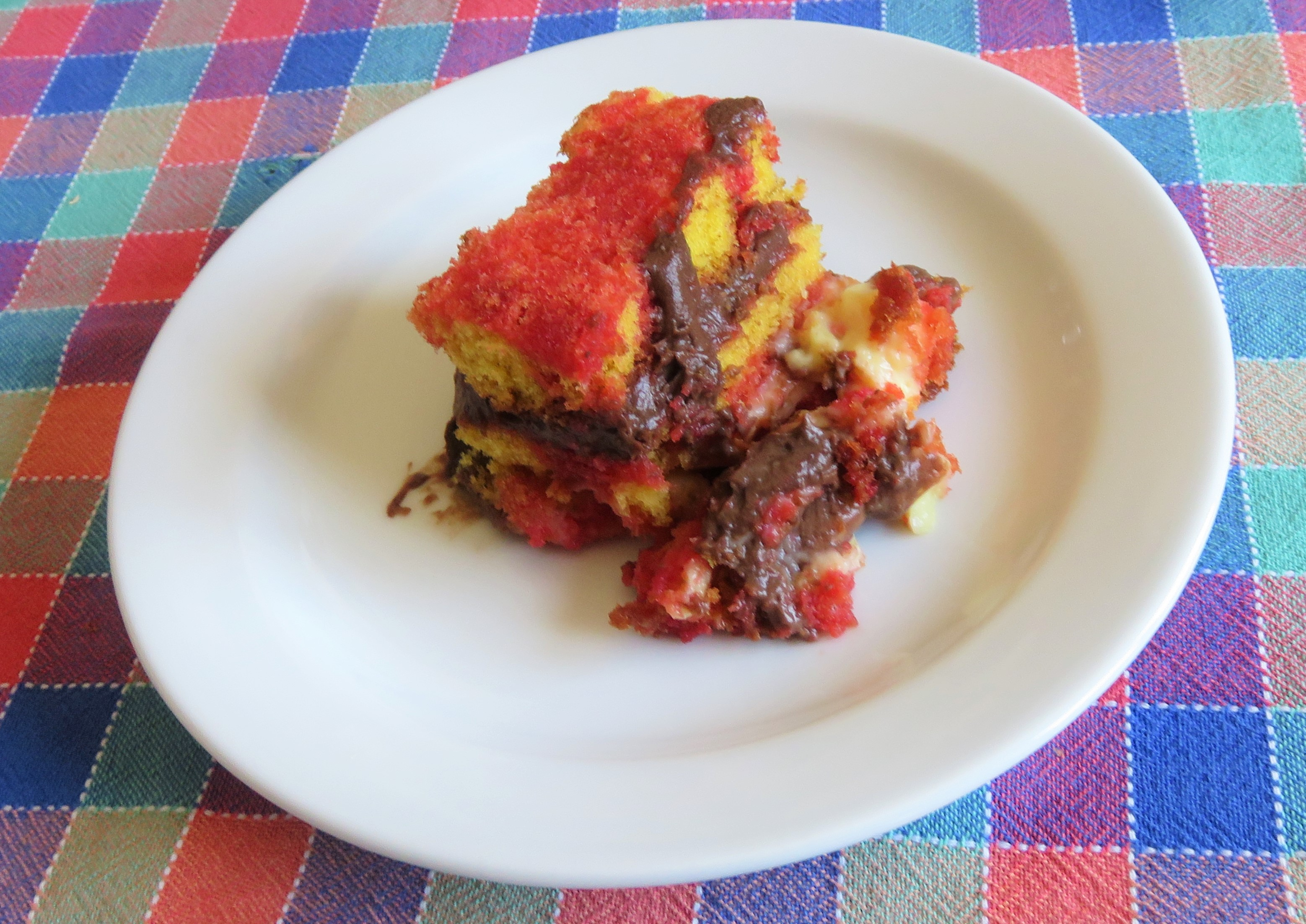
- A slice of zuppa inglese
- Course: Dessert
- Place of origin: Italy
- Associated cuisine: Italian
- Main ingredients: Sponge cake or savoiardi, alchermes, custard

Zuppa inglese (Note: English: US: /ˈzuːpə ɪŋˈɡleɪzeɪ, -eɪseɪ/ ZOO-pə ing-GLAY-zay, -say, UK: /ˈzʊpə ɪŋˈɡleɪzeɪ/ ZUU-pə ing-GLAY-zay; Italian: [ˈtsuppa iŋˈɡleːse, ˈdzu-, -eːze].) (lit. 'English soup') is an Italian dessert with layers of custard and sponge cake dipped in liqueur, perhaps derived from trifle.

To make zuppa inglese, either sponge cake or sponge fingers are dipped in alchermes, a bright red, extremely aromatic Italian herbal liqueur. They are then alternated with layers of crema pasticcera, a thick egg custard cooked with a large piece of lemon zest (removed afterwards). Often, a layer of crema al cioccolato is created by dissolving dark chocolate in a plain crema pasticcera. In Italy, it is occasionally topped with cream, meringue or almonds. Zuppa inglese is also a popular gelato flavour.

Multiple theories exist for the name: it may reference the similarity to the English trifle, or it could be a corruption of the Italian verb inzuppare ('to dunk').

Several accounts exist describing the dish's creation. One describes it as created when the Dukes of Este, the rulers of Ferrara, asked their chefs to recreate the "English trifle" the rulers had enjoyed in their frequent visits to the Elizabethan court. A later account describes it as a dessert tribute to Lord Nelson after his 1798 victory over Napoleon, created by a Neapolitan chef. Depending on the telling, the chef was either grateful and fond of English trifles, or harbouring a disdain for the English, producing a dessert of "just some doused dried cake and pastry cream with preserves" that he felt an unsophisticated English palate would like. In the Larousse Gastronomique, the creation is credited to a Neapolitan chef in 19th century Europe at a time when English trifles were popular.

== See also ==
Media related to Zuppa inglese at Wikimedia Commons

- List of Italian desserts and pastries
- List of ice cream flavors
- Zuppa Romana (dessert)
