= AQA Anthology =

Poetry anthologies

The 2008 edition of the AQA Anthology

AQA has produced anthologies for GCSE English and English Literature studied in English schools. This follows on from AQA's predecessor organisations; Northern Examinations and Assessment Board (NEAB) and Southern Examining Group (SEG).

== 2000 anthology ==
The 2000 anthology covered four sections: poets in the English Literary Heritage, poems from other cultures and traditions, 20th-century prose, and 20th- or pre-20th-century poetry.

=== English: Poets in the English Literary Heritage ===
==== Simon Armitage ====
- "I Am Very Bothered When I Think"
- "Poem"
- "It Ain't What You Do, It's What It Does To You"
- "Cataract Operation"
- "About His Person"

==== Ted Hughes ====
- "Works and Play"
- "The Warm and the Cold"
- "The Tractor"
- "Wind"
- "Hawk Roosting"

==== Carol Ann Duffy ====
- "War Photographer"
- "Valentine"
- "Stealing"
- "Before You Were Mine"
- "In Mrs. Tilscher's Class"

=== English: Poems from other cultures and traditions ===
- Sujata Bhatt: "Search for My Tongue"
- Tom Leonard: "Unrelated Incidents"
- John Agard: "Half Caste"
- Imtiaz Dharker: "Blessing"
- Moniza Alvi: "Presents from my 'Aunts' in Pakistan"
- Edward Kamau Brathwaite: "Ogun"
- Fiona Farrell: "Passengers - Charlotte O'Neil's Song"
- Arun Kolatkar: "An Old Woman"
- Grace Nichols: "Hurricane Hits England"
- Tatamkhulu Afrika: "Nothing's Changed"

=== English Literature: 20th-century prose ===
- Penelope Lively: "The Darkness Out There"
- Sylvia Plath: "Superman and Paula Brown's New Snowsuit"
- Doris Lessing: "Flight"
- Michèle Roberts: "Your Shoes"

=== English Literature: 20th- or pre-20th-century poetry ===
- "Hearts and Partners"
- "That Old Rope"
- "When the Going Gets Tough"

== 2004 anthology ==
The 2004 anthology was a collection of poems and short texts. The anthology was split into several sections covering poems from other cultures, the poetry of Seamus Heaney, Gillian Clarke, Carol Ann Duffy and Simon Armitage, and a bank of pre-1914 poems. There was also a section of prose pieces, which could have been studied in schools which had chosen not to study a separate set text.

=== English: Poems from other cultures ===
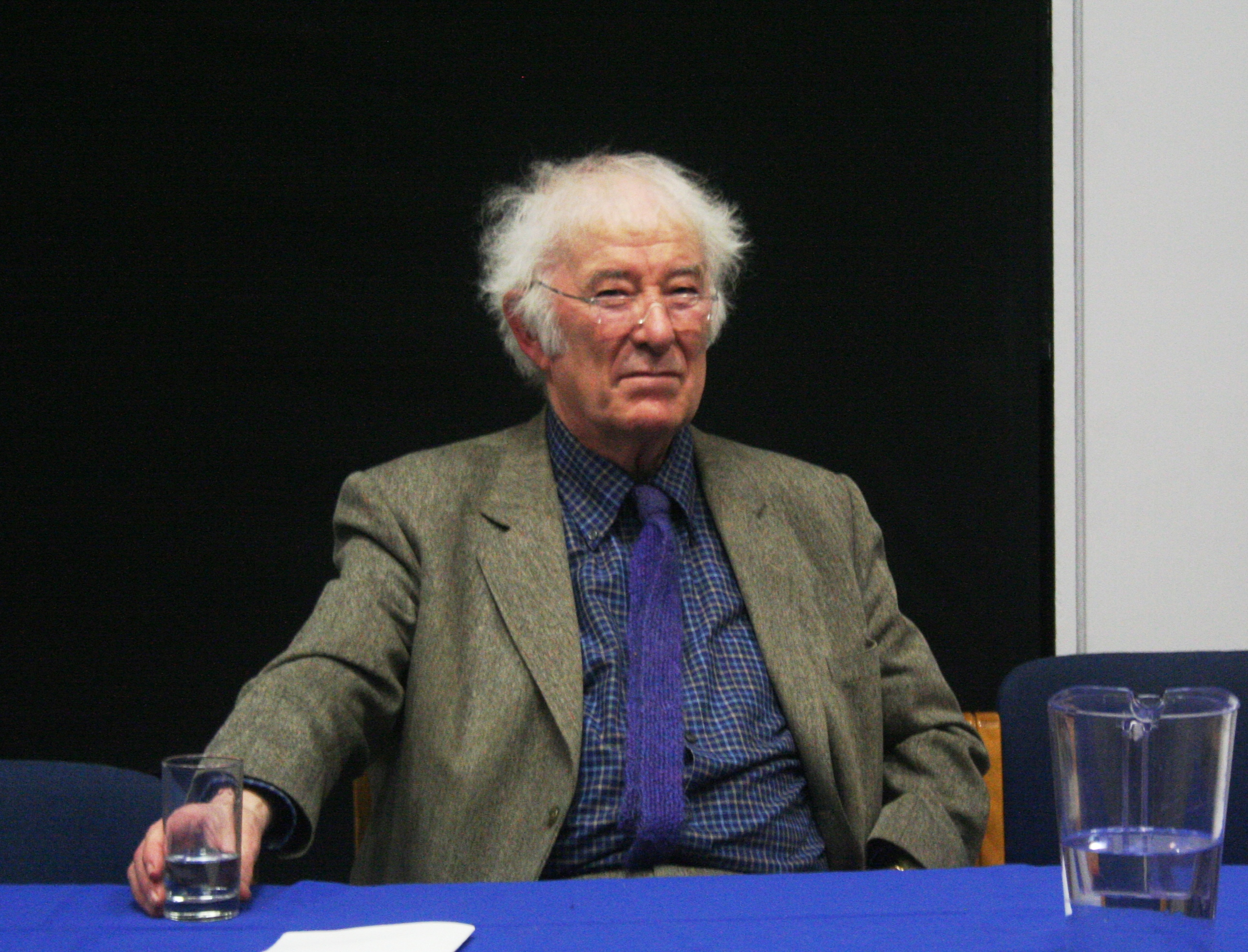
Seamus Heaney

GCSE English students studied all of the poems in either cluster and answered a question on them in Section A of Paper 2. In 2005, Andrew Cunningham, an English teacher at Charterhouse School, complained in the Telegraph that the inclusion of the poems represented an "obsession with multi-culturalism".

==== Cluster 1 ====
- Edward Kamau Brathwaite: "Limbo"
- Tatamkhulu Afrika: "Nothing's Changed"
- Grace Nichols: "Island Man"
- Imtiaz Dharker: "Blessing"
- Lawrence Ferlinghetti: "Two Scavengers in a Truck, Two Beautiful People In A Mercedes"
- Nissim Ezekiel: "Night of the Scorpion"
- Chinua Achebe: "Vultures"
- Denise Levertov: "What Were They Like?"

==== Cluster 2 ====
- Sujata Bhatt: "Search for My Tongue"
- Tom Leonard: "Unrelated Incidents"
- John Agard: "Half Caste"
- Derek Walcott: "Love After Love"
- Imtiaz Dharker: "This Room"
- Niyi Osundare: "Not My Business"
- Moniza Alvi: "Presents from my 'Aunts' in Pakistan"
- Grace Nichols: "Hurricane Hits England"

=== English Literature: Poetry ===
==== Seamus Heaney ====
- "Storm on the Island"
- "Perch"
- "Blackberry-Picking"
- "Death of a Naturalist"
- "Digging"
- "Mid-Term Break"
- "Follower"
- "At a Potato Digging"

==== Gillian Clarke ====
- "Catrin"
- "Baby-sitting"
- "Mali"
- "A Difficult Birth, Easter 1998"
- "The Field Mouse"
- "October"
- "On The Train"
- "Cold Knap Lake"

==== Carol Ann Duffy ====
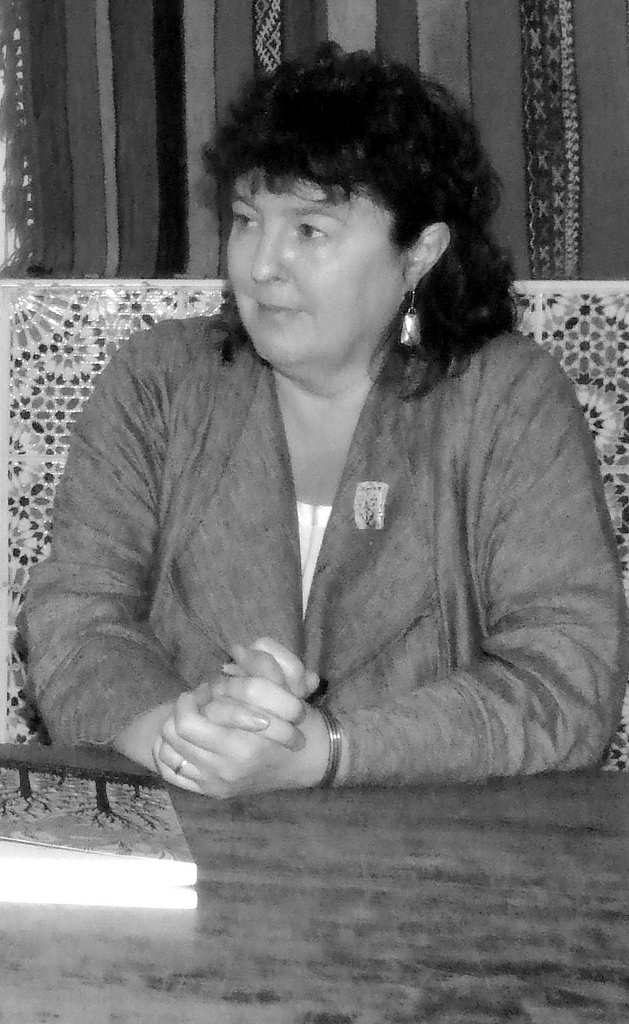
Carol Ann Duffy

- "Havisham"
- "Elvis's Twin Sister"
- "Anne Hathaway"
- "Salome"
- "We Remember Your Childhood Well"
- "Before You Were Mine"
- "Education for Leisure" (removed from the reissued anthology)
- "Stealing"

==== Simon Armitage ====
- from Book of Matches, "Mother, any distance greater than a single span"
- from Book of Matches, "My father thought it..."
- "Homecoming"
- "November"
- "Kid"
- from Book of Matches, "Those bastards in their mansions"
- from Book of Matches, "I've made out a will; I'm leaving myself"
- "Hitcher"
- "The Manhunt"

==== Pre-1914 poetry bank ====
- Ben Jonson: "On My First Sonne"
- William Butler Yeats: "The Song of the Old Mother"
- William Wordsworth: "The Affliction of Margaret"
- William Blake: "The Little Boy Lost" and "The Little Boy Found"
- Charles Tichborne: "Tichborne's Elegy"
- Thomas Hardy: "The Man He Killed"
- Walt Whitman: "Patrolling Barnegat"
- William Shakespeare: Sonnet 130 - "My mistress' eyes are nothing like the sun"
- Robert Browning: "My Last Duchess"
- Robert Browning: "The Laboratory"
- Alfred Tennyson: "Ulysses"
- Oliver Goldsmith: "The Village Schoolmaster"
- Alfred Tennyson: "The Eagle"
- John Clare: Sonnet - "I love to see the summer..."
- Percy Bysshe Shelley: "Ozymandias"

=== English Literature: Prose ===
- Doris Lessing: "Flight"
- Sylvia Plath: "Superman and Paula Brown's New Snowsuit"
- Michèle Roberts: "Your Shoes"
- Joyce Cary: "Growing Up"
- Ernest Hemingway: "The End of Something"
- Graham Swift: "Chemistry"
- Leslie Norris: "Snowdrops"

== 2008 reissued anthology ==
In 2008 the Anthology was reissued without "Education for Leisure" following complaints about its reference to knives and concerns about rising levels of knife crime in schools. In the new Anthology the poem was replaced with a "This page is left intentionally blank" notice. After removing "Education for Leisure" from the anthology the exam board was accused of censorship.

== 2010 anthology ==
The fifth anthology was produced for first teaching in 2010.

The anthology includes poems under the heading "Moon on the Tides" and prose under the heading "Sunlight on the Grass". Some of the poems are by authors of poems in the first anthology such as Agard and Armitage.

The poetry anthology was divided into four clusters, titled "Character and voice", "Place", "Conflict", and "Relationships".

=== Poems ===
==== Character and voice ====
- 'The Clown Punk' by Simon Armitage
- 'Checking Out Me History' by John Agard
- 'Horse Whisperer' by Andrew Forster
- 'Medusa' by Carol Ann Duffy
- 'Singh Song!' by Daljit Nagra
- 'Brendon Gallacher' by Jackie Kay
- 'Give' by Simon Armitage
- 'Les Grands Seigneurs' by Dorothy Molloy
- 'Ozymandias' by Percy Bysshe Shelley
- 'My Last Duchess' by Robert Browning
- 'The River God' by Stevie Smith
- 'The Hunchback in the Park' by Dylan Thomas
- 'The Ruined Maid' by Thomas Hardy
- 'Casehistory: Alison (head injury)' by U. A. Fanthorpe
- 'On a Portrait of a Deaf Man' by John Betjeman

==== Place ====
- 'The Blackbird of Glanmore' by Seamus Heaney
- 'A Vision' by Simon Armitage
- 'The Moment' by Margaret Atwood
- 'Cold Knap Lake' by Gillian Clarke
- 'Price We Pay for the Sun' by Grace Nichols
- 'Neighbours' by Gillian Clarke
- 'Crossing the Loch' by Kathleen Jamie
- 'Hard Water' by Jean Sprackland
- 'London' by William Blake
- 'The Prelude' extract by William Wordsworth
- 'The Wild Swans at Coole' by W. B. Yeats
- 'Spellbound' by Emily Brontë
- 'Below the Green Corrie' by Norman MacCaig
- 'Storm in the Black Forest' by D. H. Lawrence
- 'Wind' by Ted Hughes

==== Conflict ====
- 'Flag' by John Agard
- 'Out of the Blue' extract by Simon Armitage
- 'Mametz Wood' by Owen Sheers
- 'The Yellow Palm' by Robert Minhinnick
- 'The Right Word' by Imtiaz Dharker
- 'At the Border' by Choman Hardi
- 'Belfast Confetti' by Ciaran Carson
- 'Poppies' by Jane Weir
- 'Futility' by Wilfred Owen
- 'The Charge of the Light Brigade' by Alfred Lord Tennyson
- 'Bayonet Charge' by Ted Hughes
- 'The Falling Leaves' by Margaret Postgate Cole
- 'Come On, Come Back' by Stevie Smith
- 'next to of course god america i' by E. E. Cummings
- 'Hawk Roosting' by Ted Hughes

==== Relationships ====
- 'The Manhunt' by Simon Armitage
- 'Hour' by Carol Ann Duffy
- 'In Paris With You' by James Fenton
- 'Quickdraw' by Carol Ann Duffy
- 'Ghazal' by Mimi Khalvati
- 'Brothers' by Andrew Forster
- 'Praise Song for My Mother' by Grace Nichols
- 'Harmonium' by Simon Armitage
- Sonnet 116 by William Shakespeare
- Sonnet 43 by Elizabeth Barrett Browning
- 'To His Coy Mistress' by Andrew Marvell
- 'The Farmer's Bride' by Charlotte Mew
- 'Sister Maude' by Christina Rossetti
- 'Nettles' by Vernon Scannell
- 'Born Yesterday' by Philip Larkin

=== Modern prose ===
- 'My Polish Teacher's Tie' by Helen Dunmore
- 'When the Wasps Drowned' by Clare Wigfall
- 'Compass and Torch' by Elizabeth Baines
- 'On Seeing the 100% Perfect Girl One Beautiful April Morning' by Haruki Murakami
- 'The Darkness Out There' by Penelope Lively
- 'Anil' by Ridjal Noor
- 'Something Old, Something New' by Leila Aboulela

== 2015—16 Anthology ==
The newest edition of the anthology was produced for first teaching in September 2015, in line with the reformed GCSE English Literature qualification. The anthology includes poems under the title "Poems Past and Present", and prose under the title "Telling Tales", which can be studied as an option for the post-1914 text (However, the anthology was only studied by 0.27% of candidates in the June 2024 series, with the majority of centres instead opting for An Inspector Calls.)

The poetry anthology is divided into three clusters: "Love and Relationships", "Power and Conflict" and "Worlds and Lives", with the latter being introduced in 2023 for first exams in 2025.

=== Poems past and present ===
==== Love and Relationships ====
- 'When We Two Parted' by Lord Byron
- 'Love's Philosophy' by Percy Bysshe Shelley
- 'Porphyria's Lover' by Robert Browning
- 'Sonnet 29 - 'I think of thee!'' by Elizabeth Barrett Browning
- 'Neutral Tones' by Thomas Hardy
- 'Letters from Yorkshire' by Maura Dooley
- 'The Farmer's Bride' by Charlotte Mew
- 'Walking Away' by Cecil Day-Lewis
- 'Eden Rock' by Charles Causley
- 'Follower' by Seamus Heaney
- 'Mother, any distance' by Simon Armitage
- 'Before You Were Mine' by Carol Ann Duffy
- 'Winter Swans' by Owen Sheers
- 'Singh Song!' by Daljit Nagra
- 'Climbing My Grandfather' by Andrew Waterhouse

==== Power and Conflict ====
- 'Ozymandias' by Percy Bysshe Shelley
- 'London' by William Blake
- Extract from, 'The Prelude' by William Wordsworth
- 'My Last Duchess' by Robert Browning
- 'The Charge of the Light Brigade' by Alfred, Lord Tennyson
- 'Exposure' by Wilfred Owen
- 'Storm on the Island' by Seamus Heaney
- 'Bayonet Charge' by Ted Hughes
- 'Remains' by Simon Armitage
- 'Poppies' by Jane Weir
- 'War Photographer' by Carol Ann Duffy
- 'Tissue' by Imtiaz Dharker
- 'The Emigrée' by Carol Rumens
- 'Checking Out Me History' by John Agard
- 'Kamikaze' by Beatrice Garland

Worlds and Lives

- 'Lines Written in Early Spring' by William Wordsworth
- 'England in 1819' by Percy Bysshe Shelley
- 'Shall earth no more inspire thee' by Emily Brontë
- 'In a London Drawingroom' by George Eliot
- 'On an Afternoon Train from Purley to Victoria, 1955' by James Berry
- 'Name Journeys' by Raman Mundair
- 'pot' by Shamshad Khan
- 'A Wider View' by Seni Seneviratne
- 'Homing' by Liz Berry
- 'A Century Later' by Imtiaz Dharker
- 'The Jewellery Maker' by Louisa Adjoa Parker
- 'With Birds You're Never Lonely' by Raymond Antrobus
- 'A Portable Paradise' by Roger Robinson
- 'Like an Heiress' by Grace Nichols
- 'Thirteen' by Caleb Femi

=== Telling Tales ===
- 'Chemistry' by Graham Swift
- 'Odour of Chrysanthemums' by DH Lawrence
- 'My Polish Teacher's Tie' by Helen Dunmore
- 'Korea' by John McGahern
- 'A Family Supper' by Kazuo Ishiguro
- 'Invisible Mass of the Back Row' by Claudette Williams
- 'The Darkness Out There' by Penelope Lively

== See also ==
- Poetry Live, events where poets perform their poetry for school children
