= On the Train =

Poem by Gillian Clarke

- by Gillian Clarke
- Language: English
- Subject(s): Paddington rail crash
- Publication date: 1999

"On The Train" is a poem by Gillian Clarke. Its chief subject matter is the Paddington rail crash and its aftermath.

The poem imagines commuters on the train heading towards the "bone-ship" and refers to the anxiety of passengers and loved ones alike in the days following the disaster. Clarke uses the technology of 1999 to ground her poem in reality - the mobile phones of the victims lie in the wreckage of the train while their friends and family frantically try to ring them. She quotes the phrase:

"The Vodafone you are calling

May have been switched off.

Please call later."

This everyday phrase takes on a new, more sinister meaning in context. Clarke concludes the poem by taking a lenient view, post-Paddington, of train passengers who make mobile phone calls - they no longer seem irritating, merely essential for reassuring people that they are still alive.

This poem was written soon after the mobile phone boom of the late 1990s and as such is one of the first comments on the phenomenon. Two years later, mobile phones would again be closely linked with tragedy during the September 11 attacks.

The poem has been included in the AQA Anthology for study at GCSE alongside several other of Gillian Clarke's poems. It is one of a number of Clarke poems - including "A Difficult Birth" and "The Field-Mouse" - that comment on contemporary events alongside the minutiae of Clarke's own life.
