= Poetry Live =

Series of poetry events in the UK

Poetry Live is a series of annual events in venues across the UK where poets perform their poetry for school children studying GCSE level English Literature.

== History ==
Poetry Live has its origins in the Updates conferences which founder Simon Powell organised for A-Level students.

Early contributors included Beryl Bainbridge, Hanif Kureishi, Martin Amis, Jim Crace, Andrew Davis, Doris Lessing, Edna O’Brien, Richard Eyre, Willy Russell, Arnold Wesker, Alan Bleasdale, Melvyn Bragg, Germaine Greer, Peter Hall and Margaret Drabble, who performed for audiences of more than 2,000 school children. In later years, the event focussed on poetry, including day-long events with poets such as Ted Hughes, Seamus Heaney, Derek Walcott, James Fenton, Tony Harrison, U A Fanthorpe, Benjamin Zephaniah, Simon Armitage, Glyn Maxwell, Gillian Clarke, Linton Kwesi Johnson, Carol Ann Duffy, Liz Lochhead and Andrew Motion.

Powell realised that the Updates audience had become 'self-selecting consumers of literature', and theorised that the conferences must reach a younger, broader audience. He created Poetry Live to engage 15–16 year old students with the texts they were being asked to study as part of their GCSE English Literature course.

The original 1990s Poetry Live tour consisted of 50 events, with an audience of around 75,000 students, and grew to an average audience of 100,000 students a year by 2008.

== Cast ==
The tours consist of a core group of poets reading work from the AQA Poetry Anthology. During the 2009/2010 season the roster included Carol Ann Duffy, Simon Armitage, Gillian Clarke, John Agard, Imtiaz Dharker, Grace Nichols, Daljit Nagra and Moniza Alvi. The 2022/2023 roster includes poet laureate Simon Armitage, Carol Ann Duffy, John Agard, Imtiaz Dharker, Daljit Nagra, Owen Sheers and Grace Nichols.

In addition to the regular roster formed of poets from the AQA Anthology, organisers try to introduce an 'outsider' to each year's tour.

== Structure ==
Poetry Live events always involve a reading by each of the featured poets, including an introduction to the piece which asks students to consider the context in which it was written, and teaches them to differentiate between the poetic and non-poetic voice. Following the reading, students are given the opportunity to ask questions about the work.

Finally, the examiner sessions are an opportunity for students to receive practical advice about the English Literature GCSE exam from the examiners themselves. The first session teaches the skills needed to interpret and discuss previously-unseen poems that may appear on the exam. The second session teaches students how to compare two poems, a key component of the exam.

== Benefits ==
AQA Chief Examiner Peter Buckroyd said that Poetry Live had a positive effect on GCSE students, identifying the following benefits:

- Students have the opportunity to learn that poetry is written consciously and purposefully.
- Students learn that poetry is not an archaic art form, and can address contemporary issues.
- Students learn that poetry does not have one simple, fixed meaning.

Buckroyd stated that these learnings lead to students understanding that "it's their own response to a poem, backed up by evidence from the poem, that matters and which gets them the higher grades".
