= Falling Leaves =

Falling Leaves may refer to:

== Film ==
- Falling Leaves (1912 film), an American short film directed by Alice Guy-Blaché
- Falling Leaves (1966 film), a Soviet film directed by Otar Iosseliani

== Writing ==
- The Falling Leaves, a 1915 poem by Margaret Postgate-Cole
- Falling Leaves (play), a 1924 play by the British writer Sutton Vane
- Falling Leaves (memoir), 1997 memoir of Chinese-American physician Adeline Yen Mah

== Other uses ==
- Falling Leaves (radar network), an warning system of the United States Air Force
- "Falling Leaves", a song composed by Frankie Carle
- "The falling leaves drift by the window", opening line of the 1945 song "Autumn Leaves"

== See also ==
- Fallen Leaves (disambiguation)
- Falling leaf, an aircraft maneuver
- Falling Leaf Lake, in Montana, U.S.
