= Havisham (disambiguation) =

"Havisham" is a poem written in 1993 by Carol Ann Duffy.

Havisham may also refer to:

- Havisham (EP), 2015 album by British singer Ray BLK
- Arthur Havisham, fictional character in the Charles Dickens novel Great Expectations
- Miss Havisham, fictional character in Great Expectations
