= Search for My Tongue =

Poem by Sujata Bhatt

"Search for My Tongue" is a poem by Sujata Bhatt. The poem is studied in England as part of the AQA Anthology.

"I have always thought of myself as an Indian who is outside India", the poet has said in an interview, stating that her language is the deepest layer of her identity.

== Description ==
The poem is about personal and cultural identity and contains some Gujarati script. The poem is about how although the poet has moved to another country and no longer needs her original language, she still reminisces about it and worries that she may lose her "mother tongue". It is about how her original language feels unused and her new language she has picked up has taken over her "mother" language. However, when she sleeps, and dreams in Gujarati, she remembers her "mother tongue" again.
