= Imtiaz Dharker =

Pakistani-born British poet, artist, and video film maker

Imtiaz Dharker OBE
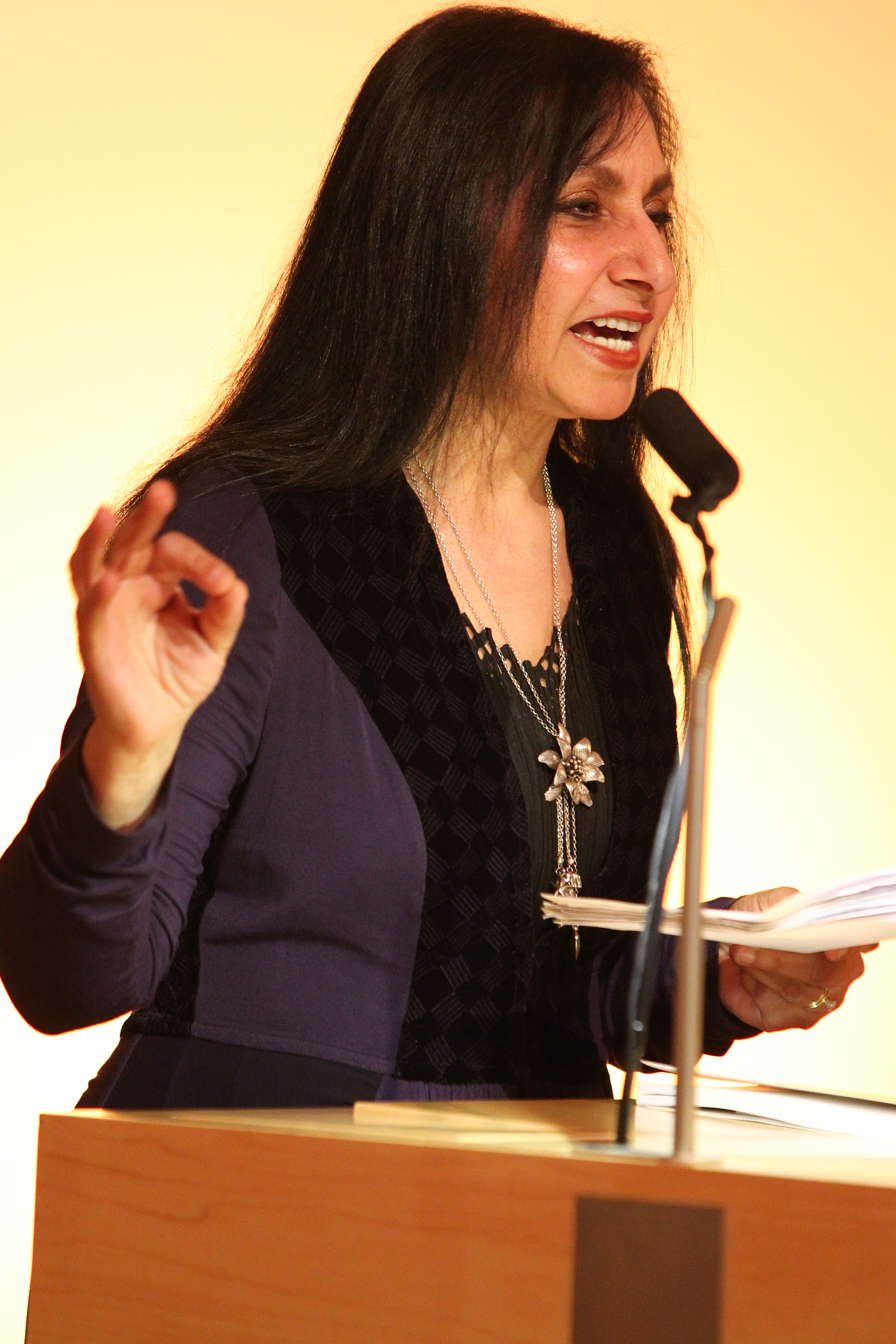
- Dharker at the British Library 12 April 2011

Chancellor of the University of Newcastle upon Tyne
- In office 1 January 2020
- Preceded by: Liam Donaldson

Personal details
- Born: 31 January 1955 (age 71) Lahore, Punjab, Pakistan
- Spouses: Anil Dharker (divorced); Simon Powell (died 2009)
- Children: Ayesha Dharker
- Occupation: Poet, artist
- Known for: Poetry

Imtiaz Dharker (born 31 January 1954) is a Pakistani-British poet, artist, and video film maker. She won the Queen's Gold Medal for her English poetry and was appointed Chancellor of Newcastle University from January 2020.

Dharker was a member of the judging panel for the 2008 Manchester Poetry Prize, with Gillian Clarke and Carol Ann Duffy. In 2011, she judged the Foyle Young Poets of the Year Award with the poet Glyn Maxwell. In 2012 she was nominated a Parnassus Poet at the Festival of the World, hosted by the Southbank Centre as part of the Cultural Olympiad 2012.

== Family ==
Dharker was born in Lahore, Punjab, Pakistan. She grew up in Glasgow where her family moved when she was less than one year old. She was married to Simon Powell, the founder of the organisation Poetry Live, who died in October 2009 after an 11 year battle with cancer.

Her daughter, Ayesha Dharker (whose father is Anil Dharker), is an actress in international films, television and stage.

== Poetry ==
The main themes of Dharker's poetry include home, freedom, journeys, geographical and cultural displacement, communal conflict and gender politics. All of her books are published by Bloodaxe Books.

In 2019, she was considered for the position of Poet Laureate following the tenure of Carol Ann Duffy, but withdrew herself from contention in order, as she stated, to maintain focus on her writing. "I had to weigh the privacy I need to write poems against the demands of a public role. The poems won," said Dharker. For many Dharker is seen as one of Britain's most inspirational contemporary poets. She was elected a Fellow of the Royal Society of Literature in 2011. In the same year, she received the Cholmondeley Award from the Society of Authors. In 2016, she received an Honorary Doctorate from SOAS University of London. She is a co-editor, with Judith Chernaik and George Szirtes, of the popular Poems on the Underground programme.

=== In the GCSE syllabus ===
Dharker is a prescribed poet on the British AQA GCSE English syllabus. Her poems Blessing, This Room and The right word were included in the AQA Anthology Different Cultures, Cluster 1 and 2 respectively. Her poem Tissue appears in the 2017 AQA poetry anthology for GCSE English Literature. Her poem A century Later appears in the World and Lives Anthology. Her poems Living Space and In Wales, wanting to be Italian also appear in the Eduqas WJEC poetry anthology for GCSE English Literature.

At Poetry Live, she reads to students every year, travelling across the country with poets including Duffy, Simon Armitage, John Agard, Gillian Clarke, Daljit Nagra, Grace Nichols, Owen Sheers, Jackie Kay and Maura Dooley. Dharker divides her time between London, Wales, and Mumbai. She says she describes herself as a "Scottish Muslim Calvinist" adopted by India and married into Wales.

== Film ==
Dharker is also a video film maker and has written and directed more than a hundred films and audio-visuals, centering on education, reproductive health and shelter for women and children. In 1980 she was awarded a Silver Lotus for a short film.

== Art ==
Dharker has had 11 solo exhibitions of pen-and-ink drawings in India, Hong Kong, USA, UK, and France. All her poetry collections contain her drawings. She was one of the poet/artists featured in the Poet Slash Artist exhibition curated by poet Lemn Sissay and the art guru Hans Ulrich Obrist for Manchester International Festival 2021, along with Tracey Emin, Lubaina Himid, Precious Okoyomon, Inua Ellams, Jay Bernard, Adonis, Etel Adnan, Anne Boyer, Jimmie Durham, Ibrahim El-Salahi, Renee Gladman, Sky Hopinka, Friederike Mayröcker, Xu Bing, and Gozo Yoshimasu.

== Publications ==
- Purdah (Oxford University Press, India, 1989)
- Postcards from God (including Purdah) (Bloodaxe Books, 1997, ISBN 1-85224-407-0)
- I Speak for the Devil (Bloodaxe Books, 2001, ISBN 978-1852245696; Penguin Books India, 2003)
- The Terrorist at my Table (Bloodaxe Books, 2006, ISBN 1-85224-735-5; Penguin Books India 2007)
- Leaving Fingerprints (Bloodaxe Books, 2009. ISBN 1-85224-849-1)
- Over the Moon (Bloodaxe Books, 2014. ISBN 978-1780371207)
- Luck is the Hook (Bloodaxe Books, 2018. ISBN 9781780372181)
- Shadow Reader (Bloodaxe Books, 2024. ISBN 9781780377094)
