= This Room =

Poem by Imtiaz Dharker

"This Room" is a poem by Imtiaz Dharker. It is included in Cluster 2, Poems from Different Cultures, of the AQA Anthology.
