= Catrin =

Catrin may refer to:

- Catrin ferch Owain Glyndŵr, one of the daughters of Margaret Hanmer and Owain Glyndŵr
- Catrin ferch Gruffudd ap Hywel, a 16th-century Welsh poet
- Katheryn of Berain, Catrin Tudor, known as 'Mother of Wales'
- "Catrin" (poem), a poem by Gillian Clarke, Welsh poet
- "El Catrin" is one of the images found in the Lotería game. In Mexican culture the term Catrin is used to describe a Dandy-like gentleman.
- "El Catrin" is a name used to describe the male counterpart to the female Mexican Day of the Dead persona, La Calavera Catrina.

People with the given name Catrin:

- Catrin Finch, Welsh harpist born in Llanon, Ceredigion
- Catrin Lloyd-Bollard, American voice actor and stage actor known for voicing Olympia in the Pokémon anime series.
- Catrin Nilsmark, Swedish golfer
- Catrin Lye, Castaway 2007 contestant
- Catrin Stewart, Welsh actress
- Catrin Hopkins, Welsh singer known as Catty
- Catrin Wahlen, German politician
