= Fallen Leaves =

Fallen Leaves may refer to:

- "Fallen Leaves" (song), a 2006 song by Billy Talent
- Fallen Leaves (film), a 2023 Finnish film

== See also ==
- The Fallen Leaves, a British rock band
- The Fallen Leaves (novel), an 1879 novel by Wilkie Collins
- Falling Leaves (disambiguation)
