= Education for Leisure =

Poem by Carol Ann Duffy

"Education for Leisure" is a poem by Poet Laureate Carol Ann Duffy which explores the mind of a person who is planning to commit a murder. Until 2008 the poem was studied at GCSE level in England and Wales as part of the AQA Anthology, a collection of poems by modern poets such as Duffy and Seamus Heaney.

== Description ==
The poem begins with the lines "Today I am going to kill something. Anything. I have had enough of being ignored and today I am going to play God." The individual in the poem feels undervalued and gradually progresses into insanity by experimenting progressively with violence beginning with killing a fly and a goldfish before terrifying a budgie and going outside armed with a bread knife; the last line of the poem is "I touch your arm" indicating the poet intends to take their first human life and at the same time creating an illusion to the reader they are under threat. The narrator's identity is never fully revealed however there are lines that allude to some facts on the character, one being the narrator is on the dole ("signing on" on a regular basis is mentioned) and it is also twice implied the narrator maybe craved recognition or even celebrity status after leaving school (the character mentions the dole office does not appreciate their autograph and towards the end of the poem tells someone over the phone in a radio station that they are "talking to a superstar").

Teachit.co.uk compares the subject of the poem to the incident where Brenda Ann Spencer carried out a shooting spree in an American school and explained her actions by stating "I don't like Mondays". The killings inspired the Boomtown Rats song I Don't Like Mondays. The poem is set against a backdrop of rising social problems in the United Kingdom during the 1980s and can be considered critical of Thatcherism. The poem references Gloucester's lines in Act 4 of King Lear, “As flies to wanton boys are we to the Gods/ They kill us for their sport”, lines which show how humankind is at the whim of the gods.

== Censorship ==
In 2008 concerns about the levels of teenage knife crime in the United Kingdom led to complaints about the inclusion of the poem in a GCSE textbook. Exam Board AQA were accused of censorship after it removed the poem from its AQA Anthology after three complaints about the poem. The most vocal complainant was Lutterworth Grammar School's exam invigilator Pat Schofield who described the poem as "absolutely horrendous".

Duffy responded to the ban by citing the level of violence in the plays of Shakespeare and by stating that she considered the message of the poem to be pro-learning and anti-violence. Some teachers stated that they would continue to teach the poem. The BBC reported that schools had been told to destroy copies of the Anthology which contained the poem. In 2002 a school in Hull refused to teach the poem.

Since the censorship, the new editions of the AQA Anthology contain a page where the poem was with the words "This page is left intentionally blank" as a placeholder.
