= Half Caste (poem) =

Poem by John Agard

"Half-Caste" is a poem by Guyanese poet John Agard that looks at people's ideas and usage of the term "half-caste", a derogatory term for people of multiracial descent. The poem is included within Agard's 2005 collection of the same name, in which he explores a range of issues affecting black and mixed-race identity in the UK. The poem is written in the first-person. Agard uses phonetic spelling throughout the poem, in order to create the voice of the speaker. It was included in the AQA Anthology, and is currently included in the Pearson Edexcel GCSE (9–1) English Literature Poetry Anthology, meaning that many British school pupils study the poem for their GCSE English Literature qualification. A snippet of Agard reading the poem is included in British rapper Loyle Carner’s 2022 single Georgetown, referencing his own mixed-race identity.
