= Anil Dharker =

Indian journalist and writer (1947–2021)

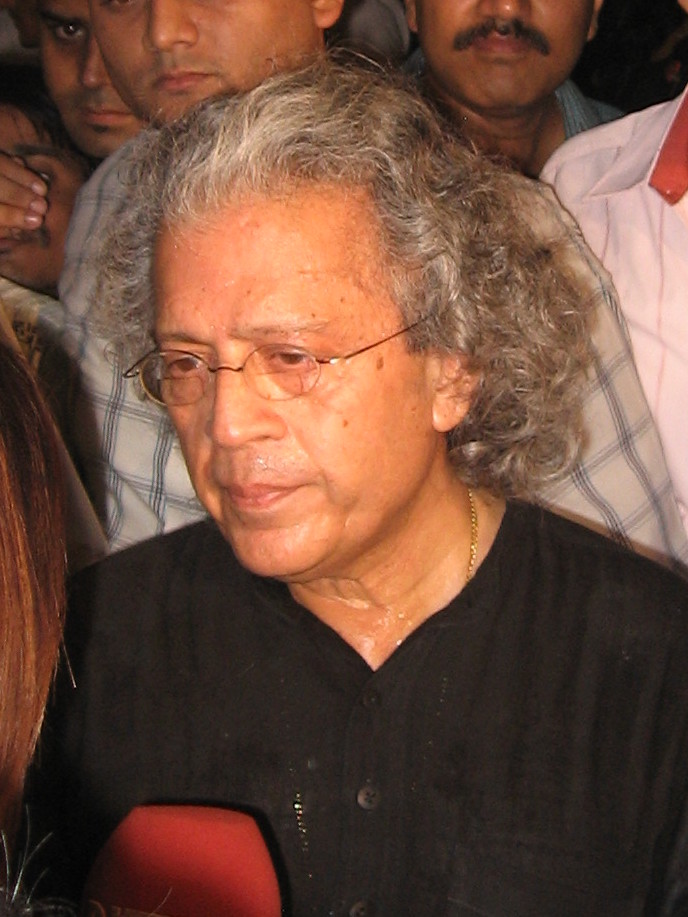
- Dharker in 2008
- Born: 1947
- Died: 26 March 2021 (aged 73–74)
- Education: University of London
- Occupations: Journalist, columnist
- Children: Ayesha Dharker (daughter)
- Parent(s): Vasumati and Chandrakant Dharker
- Website: https://anildharker.com

Anil Dharker (1947 – 26 March 2021) was an Indian journalist and writer. He was the founder and director of the Mumbai International Literary Festival which is held in November every year. He was also the founder and director of Literature Live! which holds literary evenings through the year in different locations in Mumbai.

== Education ==
After completing a degree in mathematics in India, he left for England, where he obtained a degree in mechanical engineering from the University of London.

== Career ==
He joined the academic staff of the University of Glasgow, where he specialised in Building Services Engineering.

On returning to India, he joined the leading architectural firm, Phoroze Kudianavala and Associates as a senior consultant. Here he pioneered the concept and practice of fire safety in multi-storied buildings, then a much-neglected field in India. He initiated the use of smoke detectors, sprinklers, positive air pressure and other practices which are now prescribed by law for new buildings.

Due to his extensive writing on cinema, the Ministry of Information and Broadcasting placed him on the advisory board of the Film Censor Board where he drafted a liberalised and simplified censorship code which eventually formed the basis for the official film certification code.

Later, he moved to the National Film Development Corporation (then called the Film Finance Corporation), and eventually became its head. During this time, many film-makers who are now household names, made their first movies with NFDC. Examples are Govind Nihalani, Saeed Mirza, Aparna Sen, Vidhu Vinod Chopra, Ketan Mehta, Goutam Ghose.

Dharker was also responsible for opening the Akashwani Auditorium in South Bombay as an art movie theatre.

Dharker's most significant contribution to NFDC was to enable it to co-produce Richard Attenborough's film Gandhi, the multiple Oscar winner.

Dharker was also on the selection committees for India's International Film Festivals and also represented NFDC in overseas film festivals in Cannes, Berlin, Chicago and London.

Anil Dharker was editor of a variety of publications, starting with Debonair (magazine) (a monthly), Mid-day and Sunday Mid-day (evening papers); The Independent, a morning broad-sheet from the Times of India group and The Illustrated Weekly of India.

Dharker left the Times of India group to head India TV a business-cum-entertainment channel promoted by the Dalal Street Journal group which was then poised to take off (no relation to the current channel of the same name). He later briefly became Creative Director of the Zee Television Network. Over the years, he conducted hundreds of interviews with prime ministers, governors, Nobel Prize-winning writers, film directors and actors and several others for the national broadcaster, Doordarshan. He was a regular participant on most news channels where his views were sought on political and social issues. After his foray into television, Anil Dharker returned to full-time journalism, this time as a free-lance columnist. At various times, his columns appeared in The Times of India, The Hindu, The Economic Times, Khaleej Times, Gulf News, The Scotsman, The Sunday Observer, Mid-day and other publications. His columns appeared in The Asian Age, The Financial Chronicle, Deccan Chronicle, OnStage and The Huffington Post.

In 2010, Dharker founded the Mumbai International Literary Festival. This takes place in November at the National Centre for Performing Arts in South Mumbai and simultaneously at Prithvi Theatre in North Mumbai. Dharker continued as the Festival Director of the litfest. Literature Live! the organisation he founded to run the litfest, also organises literary events through the year in different parts of Mumbai.

== Other interests ==
Anil Dharker was a versatile sportsman. He captained the Table Tennis teams of London University and Glasgow University and played for the Combined British University Table Tennis team.

He played cricket, squash and badminton, representing his university in all sports. He was the recipient of the YMCA London's Sportman of the Year award. He represented Bombay Gymkhana in tennis.

Anil Dharker was the Founder and Chairman of the Single Malt Club of Bombay.

Dharker was the Chairman of Citizens for Justice and Peace, a Mumbai-based NGO fighting for redressal in miscarriages of justice.

Anil Dharker was an invited member of 100 Citizens of Bombay, a member of the Advisory Boards of the Indian Council for Cultural Relations (ICCR), Doordarshan, the Children's Film Society of India and several film funds for production of films in India. He was also the recipient of several awards for journalism.

== Personal life ==
For several years Dharker lived in Mumbai with the editor and journalist, Amy Fernandes.

He had two sisters, the former Bharat Natyam dancer Minal Dharker and the writer Rani Dharker. He had one daughter, the actress Ayesha Dharker from an earlier marriage with the poet Imtiaz Dharker. He died after a brief illness on 26 March 2021.

== Books ==
- Sorry, Not Ready: Television in the Time of PM Darshan (HarperCollins) ISBN 9788172232726
- The Romance of Salt about Mahatma Gandhi`s Dandi March (Roli Books) ISBN 9788174363985
- Icons: Men and Women Who Made Modern India (Roli Books) ISBN 9788174369444
- Man Who Talked to Machines (a biography of industrialist O P Jindal) ISBN 9788190217002
- The Possible Dream: The Story of the Mumbai Marathon ISBN 978-8129118837
