= The Emigrée =

Poem by Carol Rumens

"The Émigrée" is a poem by British author Carol Rumens. The poem is about emigration, which is where the word "émigrée", the French form of "emigrate" comes from. The poem is included in AQA's current GCSE English Literature Power and Conflict Anthology

== Context ==
The poem explores the memory of the speaker and their experiences in a faraway city they spent time in as a child. The narrator reminisces about the place through their childhood eyes, although we see conflict between this and their adult perception of her homeland. The narrator pictures in their mind the country or city where (s)he was born.

An emigrée is the term for someone who has to leave a country for political or social reasons, such as a refugee or an asylum seeker.

Rumens is English and has no personal experience of emigration but left the place unspecific so it could apply to many different people's experiences. The poet bases many of the ideas on modern examples of emigration from countries like Russia or the Middle East where people are fleeing corruption or tyranny, or those countries that change in their absence to some form of dictatorship.
