= Elvis's Twin Sister =

Poem by Carol Ann Duffy

"Elvis's Twin Sister" is a poem by Carol Ann Duffy that is said to reflect "the hidden lives of generations of overlooked women" as part of the collection The World's Wife, of 30 similar poems dealing with the female relatives of famous men throughout history. The poem is sometimes studied by schoolchildren in the United Kingdom as part of the AQA syllabus for GCSE English.

== Description ==
The poem's subtitle, "Are You Lonesome Tonight?", was a 1961 hit by Elvis Presley. Its opening line, "In the convent, y'all", establishes its speaker in the southern United States through its use of colloquial language. The poem goes on to describe Elvis's sister as a nun in a convent, tending its garden.

== Performance ==
At Poetry Live in London, Duffy performed the poem herself on 1 December 2008.
