= Manchester Poetry Prize =

Poetry award in the United Kingdom

- Type: Literary award
- Country: United Kingdom
- First award: 2008; 18 years ago
- Website: manchesterwritingcompetition.co.uk

The Manchester Poetry Prize is a literary award celebrating excellence in creative writing. It was launched by Carol Ann Duffy and The Manchester Writing School at Manchester Metropolitan University (MMU) in 2008, and was the first phase of the annual Manchester Writing Competition. Open internationally to writers aged 16 or over, the Manchester Poetry Prize awards a cash prize of £10,000 to the writer of the best portfolio of poems submitted. In addition, during the 2008 and 2010 Prizes, a bursary for study at MMU (or cash equivalent) was awarded to an entrant aged 18–25 as part of the Jeffrey Wainwright Manchester Young Writer of the Year Award. Entrants are asked to submit a portfolio of poetry (three to five poems; the total length of the portfolio should not exceed 120 lines). The poems can be on any subject but must be new work, not published elsewhere (in print, or online).

By the closing date of 1 August, the 2008 Manchester Poetry Prize had attracted 1,137 entries (almost 4,700 poems) from more than 30 countries. The 2008 competition was judged by Duffy with poets Gillian Clarke and Imtiaz Dharker completing the panel. They short-listed six finalists, and the winners were announced at a gala prize-giving ceremony held on Thursday 16 October 2008 at the Royal Northern College of Music in Manchester - an event which officially opened the 2008 Manchester Literature Festival, and featured readings from the judges and all six short-listed entrants. The evening was hosted by James Draper from the Manchester Writing School and featured welcome speeches from the Manchester Literature Festival's Matthew Frost and Rosa Battle from Manchester City Council (representing the Lord Mayor's Office).

The joint winners, Lesley Saunders and Mandy Coe, impressed the judges with their contrasting but brilliant styles and shared the £10,000 Prize. Helen Mort, 23, from Sheffield, won the Manchester Young Writer of the Year Award. The runners-up were Mike Barlow, Allison McVety and Rosie Shepperd.

The Manchester Writing School launched the second Manchester Poetry Prize in 2010 with Simon Armitage, Lavinia Greenlaw and Daljit Nagra as judges. The competition closed on 6 August, having received more than 1,000 portfolios (almost 4,000 poems). The award ceremony again formed part of the Manchester Literature Festival and was a gala dinner held at Manchester Metropolitan University, hosted by James Draper and Matthew Frost (this time working as a humorous double act) with music from the Gavin Barras Duo and readings from the judges and six finalists.

Armitage gave a speech before announcing the winners:

"A question often asked when poetry has one of its brief moments in the spotlight is, 'How is poetry doing? What kind of state is it in? Is it in good health?' And the answer I tend to give is that it is as well as it ever was and no worse than it will ever be. Poetry is not popular. Popular culture is popular. Pop music is popular. Popcorn is popular. Poetry isn't popular. If it were, it wouldn't be poetry. It isn't dormant or dead, or even having a little nap. Poetry is awake, alive, alert, doing its own thing, available to all, attractive to the few, beholden to none. Wherever we find the hot air of politics and the blunt instrument of dogma and the double-speak of the marketplace and the silver tongue of the media, we'll also find poetry – a small but endlessly dense counterweight to all that guff. So, ask me how poetry is doing and that's what I'll usually say. But ask me after judging the Manchester Poetry Prize and I'll say it seems to be in very good health indeed. Prizes and poetry aren't obvious bed-mates. Prizes really belong to the world of game-shows and sport. But if they must exist, then they should be meaningful and they should be credible. The Manchester Poetry Prize is certainly significant; it's one of the biggest in the country already. And in terms of being honourable, asking for anonymous entries ensures that reputations and allegiances don't enter the equation. Also asking for a batch of poems rather than a single entry allows judges to look beyond competency and control in writing and to reward other virtues, such as risk-taking, inventiveness and sustained achievement. There was, throughout the entries, plenty of that on display."

The winner of the £10,000 first prize was Judy Brown. Michelle Kern from New York won the Jeffrey Wainwright Manchester Young Writer of the Year Award. The runners-up were John Wedgwood Clarke, Clive McWilliam, Lesley Saunders (who won in 2008) and Jack Underwood.

The Manchester Writing School launched the first Manchester Fiction Prize in 2009, with Nicholas Royle as Head Judge, joined by Sarah Hall and M. John Harrison; the School launched a second Fiction Prize in 2011, with Royle chairing the panel for a second time, joined by Heather Beck, John Burnside and Alison MacLeod. A third Manchester Poetry Prize followed in 2012, and while the £10,000 main prize will remain, the Young Writer bursary element was dropped. In 2013, the Prize became an annual event and a Manchester Writing for Children Competition (Poetry) was launched, with judges Mandy Coe, Imtiaz Dharker and Philip Gross.
