= Two Scavengers in a Truck, Two Beautiful People in a Mercedes =

Poem by Lawrence Ferlinghetti

"Two Scavengers in a Truck, Two Beautiful People in a Mercedes" is a poem by American poet Lawrence Ferlinghetti. Up until 2010, the poem was studied by English school children as part of the GCSE AQA Anthology.

== Description ==
The poem describes four people stuck at traffic lights in downtown San Francisco - two are garbage collectors and two are an elegant couple in a Mercedes. The poem is about the contrast between these people and the gap that is developing between the rich and poor even in the USA which is meant to be a 'democracy'. The description of the couple as "Beautiful People" is perhaps ironic as the term was first used to describe those had held countercultural ideals during the 1960s. The poem questions whether America can be called a Russian scam given the disparities in wealth between those, rich and poor.
