= Havisham =

1993 poem by Carol Ann Duffy

"Havisham" is a poem written in 1993 by Carol Ann Duffy. It responds to Miss Havisham, a character in Charles Dickens' novel Great Expectations, looking at her mental and physical state many decades after being left standing at the altar, when the bride-to-be is in her old age. It expresses Havisham's anger at her fiancé and her bitter rage over wedding-day trauma and jilted abandonment. Duffy's use of language is very powerful and passionate. Throughout the poem oxymorons and juxtaposition such as "Beloved sweetheart bastard" and "Love's hate" portrays the ambivalence and restless uncertainty of the character, while a sexual fantasy reveals both the unrequited love and the passion that remains within Havisham following the wedding, a devastation from which her heart has never recovered.

The poem is featured in the examining board AQA's English Literature Anthology for its GCSE qualification in English Literature. It is featured alongside works by Duffy, and three other contemporary writers: Simon Armitage, Seamus Heaney and Gillian Clarke. This poem is also featured in the Scottish Qualifications Authority's National 5 and Higher English Critical Reading paper, in the Scottish Texts section. Candidates study Anne Hathaway, War Photographer, Originally, Valentine and Mrs Midas alongside this poem.

"Havisham"

Beloved sweetheart bastard. Not a day since then

I haven't wished him dead, Prayed for it

so hard I've dark green pebbles for eyes,

ropes on the back of my hands I could strangle with.

Spinster. I stink and remember. Whole days

in bed cawing Nooooo at the wall; the dress

yellowing, trembling if I open the wardrobe;

the slewed mirror, full-length, her, myself, who did this

to me? Puce curses that are sounds not words.

Some nights better, the lost body over me,

my fluent tongue in its mouth in its ear

then down till I suddenly bite awake. Love's

hate behind a white veil; a red balloon bursting

in my face. Bang. I stabbed at a wedding-cake.

Give me a male corpse for a long slow honeymoon.

Don't think it's only the heart that b-b-b-breaks.
