= Elizabeth Bartlett (British poet) =

British poet

- Born: April 24, 1924
- Died: June 18, 2008 (aged 84)
- Occupation: Poet
- Spouse: Denis Perkins

Elizabeth Bartlett (April 24, 1924 – June 18, 2008) was a British poet. Her work was largely inspired by the realities of working-class British life, including her experiences with mental illness and work for the National Health Service.

== Life ==
Elizabeth Bartlett was born into a working-class family in Deal, Kent on April 24, 1924. Her father was a grocer’s assistant, while her mother was a maid who took in laundry to make ends meet. Bartlett won a grammar school scholarship but due to her family’s financial circumstances, she left school at the age of 15 to work in a factory. In 1943, at the age of 19, her poem “Half Holiday” was published in Poetry London. The same year, she married writer Denis Perkins. She became stepmother to his two sons, Benedick and Adrian. They later had a son together, Alexander. Bartlett lived in Burgess Hill, West Sussex for most of her adult life.

Bartlett pursued adult education and was involved with the Workers’ Educational Association as a student and tutor. She worked as a medical secretary for the National Health Service for 16 years, which inspired many of her poems about ill and vulnerable people. She herself experienced periods of clinical depression and received psychiatric treatment for five years. Over the next three decades, she continued writing poetry but only published sparingly in journals. She said that she preferred writing without an audience of readers, publishers, and editors. She began publishing in earnest in her fifties and continued until her eightieth birthday.

After her husband was diagnosed with Alzheimer's disease, Bartlett cared for him until his death in 2001. She died in 2008 at the age of 84.

== Poetry ==
Bartlett’s early influences included Edward Thomas, Rupert Brooke, Siegfried Sassoon, and Wilfred Owen, whom she studied at school. She was also inspired by her own life and family, including her marriage, motherhood, and her grandmother, who fled Ireland as a child during the potato famine.

Her first poetry collection, A Lifetime of Dying, was published in 1979 and featured poems written in the preceding three decades.

Bartlett’s work has been favorably compared to Philip Larkin, Anne Sexton, and Kingsley Amis. Carol Rumens, who edited one of Bartlett's poetry collections, wrote that Bartlett “forge[d] ahead” of her peers in The Movement “in thematic scope and emotional honesty.”

Bartlett’s final book of poems, Mrs. Perkins and Oedipus, was published on her 80th birthday.

Recordings of Bartlett reading some of her poems are available on The Poetry Archive.

== Works ==
- A Lifetime of Dying (1979)
- Strange Territory (1983)
- The Czar is Dead (1986)
- Look No Face (1991)
- Two Women Dancing: New and Selected Poems (1995)
- Mrs. Perkins and Oedipus (2004)

== Awards ==
- 1996 Cholmondeley Award
