= Presents from my Aunts in Pakistan =

Poem by Moniza Alvi

"Presents from my Aunts in Pakistan" is a poem by Moniza Alvi. Alvi describes a few gifts that she receives from her aunts. These gifts serve as a metaphor for her Pakistani culture, and she says how much it clashes with her English culture. The poem is about the poet's struggle to find which culture she truly belongs to; Pakistani or English. It is included in Cluster 2, Poems from Different Cultures, of the AQA Anthology.
