= Catrin (poem) =

"Catrin" is a poem written by Welsh poet Gillian Clarke about her daughter, Catrin growing up, and "the tight red rope of love", the strong bond between them that can never be broken. It describes the loving relationship between the mother and daughter and the various conflicts they may face within that relationship.
