= Superman and Paula Brown's New Snowsuit =

1955 short story by Sylvia Plath

"Superman and Paula Brown's New Snowsuit" is a short story by Sylvia Plath, written in 1955. It deals with children's fantasies (about Superman) and with how children can put blame on others for their material losses (a ruined snowsuit) and easily fall into collective blaming. When you are accused of something, in reality Superman is never around to save you easily.
