= Unrelated Incidents =

Series of poems by Tom Leonard

Unrelated Incidents is a series of poems by Tom Leonard. Written in 1976, One of the better-known of this series is "The Six o'clock News".

== The Six o'clock news ==
The poem "The Six o'clock News" tackles working-class alienation, using the device of a Glaswegian speaking as a BBC newsreader, with what is certainly not a received pronunciation accent. John Corbett, writing on the Association for Scottish Literary Studies website, asserts that "The whole point of [this poem] (in which the six o’clock news is read in a Glasgow accent) is not to burlesque the rules of decorum, but, by inverting them, to challenge head-on the social structures and attitudes which maintain them."
