= Tatamkhulu Afrika =

Poet, writer and anti-apartheid activist (1920–2002)

Ismail Joubert
- Born: Mogamed Fu'ad Nasif; 7 December 1920; As Sallum, Egypt
- Died: 23 December 2002 (aged 82)
- Writing career
- Pen name: Tatomkhulu Afrika

Ismail Joubert (7 December 1920 – 23 December 2002), commonly known as Tatomkhulu Afrika, which is Xhosa for Grandfather Africa, was a South African poet and writer. His first novel, Broken Earth was published when he was seventeen (under his "Methodist name"), but it was over fifty years until his next publication, a collection of verse entitled Nine Lives.

He won numerous literary awards including the gold Molteno Award for lifetime services to South African literature, and in 1996, his works were translated into French. His autobiography, Mr Chameleon, was published posthumously in 2005.

== Biography ==
Tatamkhulu Afrika was born Mogamed Fu'ad Nasif in Egypt to an Egyptian father and a Turkish mother, and came to South Africa as a very young child. Both his parents died of flu, and he was fostered by family friends under the name John Carlton.

He fought in World War II in the North African campaign and was captured at Tobruk. His experiences as a prisoner of war featured prominently in his writing. After World War II he left his foster family and went to Namibia (then South-West Africa), where he was fostered by an Afrikaans family, taking his third legal name of Jozua Joubert.

In 1964, he converted to Islam, legally changed his name to Ismail Joubert, and spent some time in prison. It was here that he first experienced forms of homosexual sex being employed in a state context to intimidate political prisoners, which would go on to become a major theme of his later literary work, as tensions between homophobia and homoeroticism feature largely.

He lived in Cape Town's District 6, a mixed race inner-city community. District 6 was declared a "whites only" area in the 1960s and the community was destroyed. With an Egyptian father and a Turkish mother, Afrika could have been classified as a "white", but refused as a matter of principle. He founded Al-Jihaad to oppose the destruction of District Six and apartheid in general, and when this became affiliated with the African National Congress' armed wing, Umkhonto We Sizwe, he was given the praise name of Tatamkhulu Afrika, which he adopted until he died.

In 1987, he was arrested for terrorism and banned from speaking or writing in public for five years, although he continued writing under the name of Tatamkhulu Afrika. He was imprisoned in the same prison as Nelson Mandela and was released in 1992.

Tatamkulu Afrika died on 23 December 2002 shortly after his 82nd birthday, from injuries received when he was run over by a motorist two weeks before, just after the publication of his final novel, Bitter Eden. He left a number of unpublished works, including his autobiography, two novels, four short novels, two plays and poetry.

== Poetry ==
- Night Light (Carrefour/Hippogriff, 1991)
- Dark Rider (Snailpress/Mayibuye 1993)
- Maqabane (Mayibuye Books, 1994)
- Flesh and the Flame (Silk Road, 1995)
- The Lemon Tree (Snailpress, 1995)
- Turning Points (Mayibuye, 1996)
- The Angel and Other Poems (Carapace, 1999)
- Mad Old Man Under the Morning Star (Snailpress, 2000)
- Au Ceux (French translations) (Editions Creathis l'ecole des filles, 2000)
- Nothing's Changed (2002)

== Novels ==
- Broken earth (1940)
- The Innocents (1994)
- Tightrope (1996)
- Bitter Eden (Arcadia Books, 2002) An autobiographical novel set in a prisoner-of-war camp during World War II. The novel deals with three men who see themselves as straight but must negotiate the emotions that are brought to the surface by the physical closeness of survival in the male-only camps. The complex rituals of camp life and the strange loyalties and deep bonds between the men are depicted.
- Mr Chameleon: An Autobiography, Jacana Media, 2005.
