= What Were They Like? =

Poem by Denise Levertov

"What Were They Like?" is a poem by Denise Levertov written as a protest against the Vietnam War, envisaging a future where the "genocide" that the American bombing campaign began had been completed, and nothing is known of Vietnam or its culture. Major themes within the poem include: war, culture and anger. It is included in the AQA, OCR and Edexcel anthologies that English students study for GCSE.
