= Carol Rumens =

British poet (1944–2026)

Carol Rumens FRSL
- Born: 10 December 1944; Forest Hill, London, England
- Died: 25 April 2026 (aged 81)
- Occupation: Poet

Academic background
- Education: University of London

Academic work
- Discipline: Creative writing

Carol Rumens FRSL (born Carol-Ann Lumley; 10 December 1944 – 25 April 2026) was a British poet.

== Life and career ==
Carol Rumens was born Carol-Ann Lumley in Forest Hill, South London, in 1944. She won a scholarship to Manchester Grammar School and later studied Philosophy at London University, but left before completing her degree. She married David Rumens in 1965 (divorced 1985) and was mother to two daughters. She gained a Postgraduate Diploma in Writing for the Stage (with Distinction) from City College Manchester in 2002.

She taught at University of Kent at Canterbury (1983–85), Queen's University Belfast (1991–93 and 1995–98), University College Cork (1994), Stockholm University (1999), and University of Hull. As visiting Professor of Creative Writing, she has taught at the University of Wales, Bangor, and at the University of Hull.

Rumens was Poetry Editor for the publisher Quarto (1982–84) and the literary Review (1984–88). Her work has appeared in The Guardian(for whom she wrote the "Poem of the Week" column from 2007 until her death) and Harper's. She was elected a Fellow of the Royal Society of Literature in 1984. She also edited the poems of Elizabeth Bartlett and wrote Bartlett's obituary for The Guardian in 2008.

Rumens died from a brain tumour on 25 April 2026, aged 81.

== Awards ==
- 1981: New Statesman Prudence Farmer Award, for An Easter Garland
- 1984: Alice Hunt Bartlett Award (joint winner), for Unplayed Music
- 1984: [Cholmondeley Award]
- 1998: Belfast Arts Award for Literature (shortlist), for Holding Pattern
- 1998: Forward Poetry Prize (Best Single Poem) (shortlisted for "A Day in the Life of Farmer Dream")
- 2001: Cardiff International Poetry Competition (Fourth Prize, for "Kings of the Playground")
- 2001: National Poetry Competition ("Stay in Touch")
- 2002: Forward Poetry Prize (Best Single Poem) (shortlist)

== Works ==
=== Poetry ===
- "Girl, Got; Direct Train; December in Chapultepec Park, Mexico City; Dotage". Acorn 15. Archived from the original on 18 May 2008.
- A Strange Girl in Bright Colours. Quartet. 1973.
- A Necklace of Mirrors Ulsterman, 1978
- Unplayed Music. Secker & Warburg. 1981.
- Scenes from the Gingerbread House. Bloodaxe. 1982. ISBN 978-0-906427-27-9.
- Star Whisper. Secker & Warburg. 1983. ISBN 978-0-436-43901-8.
- Direct Dialling. Chatto & Windus. 1985. ISBN 978-0-7011-2911-8.
- Icon Waves The Star Wheel Press, 1986
- Selected Poems. Chatto & Windus. 1987. ISBN 978-0-7011-3201-9.
- The Greening of the Snow Beach. Bloodaxe. 1988. ISBN 978-1-85224-062-2.
- From Berlin to Heaven. Chatto & Windus. 1989.
- Thinking of Skins: New and Selected Poems. Bloodaxe. 1993. ISBN 978-1-85224-280-0.
- Best China Sky. Bloodaxe. 1995. ISBN 978-1-85224-337-1.
- The Miracle Diet. Bloodaxe. 1997. ISBN 978-1-85224-418-7.
- Holding Pattern. Blackstaff Press. 1998. ISBN 978-0-85640-638-6.
- Hex. Bloodaxe. 2002. ISBN 978-1-85224-602-0.
- Selected Poems 1968-2004. Bloodaxe. 2004. ISBN 978-1-85224-680-8.
- Blind Spots. Seren. 2008. ISBN 978-1-85411-465-5.
- De Chirico's Threads. Seren. 2010. ISBN 978-1-85411-534-8.
- The Émigrée

=== Novels ===
- Plato Park. Chatto & Windus. 1987. ISBN 978-0-7011-3202-6.

=== Editor ===
- Making for the Open: The Chatto Book of Post-Feminist Poetry 1964-1984. Chatto & Windus. 1985. ISBN 978-0-7011-2848-7.
- Slipping Glimpses: Winter Poetry Supplement (editor), Poetry Book Society, 1985
- New Women Poets. Bloodaxe. 1990. ISBN 978-1-85224-145-2.
- Two Women Dancing: New and Selected Poems of Elizabeth Bartlett (editor), Bloodaxe, 1995
- Old City, New Rumours: A Hull Anthology (editor Five Leaves Press, 2010

=== Plays ===
- Nearly Siberia (Pascal Theatre Company, Newcastle and London, 1989)
- The Freak of the Week Show (EyeSpy Theatre Company, East Didsbury Studio, Manchester, 2001)
- Suzanne Hecabe (Arden School of Theatre, Manchester, 2002).

=== Translations ===
- Pencil Letter /Irina Ratushinskaya (translator), Bloodaxe, 1988
- The Poetry of Perestroika. Translated by Carol Rumens; Richard McKane. Iron Press. 1990. ISBN 978-0-906228-35-7.
- After Pushkin (contributor), Carcanet, 2000 with Yuri Drobyshev
- Yevgenii Rein: Selected Poems (translator), Bloodaxe, 2001

=== Non-fiction ===
- Self into Song: Newcastle/Bloodaxe Poetry Lectures, Bloodaxe, 2006
- Carol Rumens (21 January 2009). "Elizabeth Alexander's praise poem was way too prosy". The Guardian. London.
- Carol Rumens (15 December 2008). "Poem of the week: Darling, Would You Please Pick Up Those Books?". The Guardian. London.
- Carol Rumens (23 August 1992). "BOOKS / Poetry: Carol Rumens on two exciting new collections". The Independent. London.
- Writing Poetry. Routledge. 2002. ISBN 978-0-415-30389-7.
