= Flight (Lessing story) =

Short story by Doris Lessing

"Flight" is a 1957 short story by Doris Lessing. It deals with an unnamed old man who is against his eighteen-year-old granddaughter getting married, bringing him into conflict with not only her and her fiancé, but also his daughter, who was herself married even younger and whose other three daughters have already been married.
