= Hurricane Hits England =

Poem by Grace Nichols

"Hurricane Hits England" is a poem by Grace Nichols. In the poem, Nichols talks about how the arrival of a hurricane in England reminds her of her South American heritage. This makes her feel closer to home.
