= Tom Leonard (poet) =

Scottish poet, writer and critic (1944–2018)

- Born: 22 August 1944; Glasgow, Scotland
- Died: 21 December 2018 (aged 74); Glasgow, Scotland
- Education: University of Glasgow
- Occupation: Writer
- Writing career
- Genres: Scottish literature, poetry
- Notable works: Six Glasgow Poems; The Six O'Clock News
- Website: tomleonard.co.uk

Thomas Anthony Leonard (22 August 1944 – 21 December 2018) was a Scottish poet, writer and critic. He was best known for his poems written in Glaswegian dialect, particularly his Six Glasgow Poems and "The Six O'Clock News". His work frequently dealt with the relationship between language, class and culture.

== Biography ==
Leonard was born in Glasgow in 1944. His father was a train-driver who had moved to Scotland from Dublin in 1916. His mother, also of Irish descent, came from Saltcoats and had previously worked at the Nobel dynamite factory in Ardeer. Leonard was the youngest of four children; he had two brothers and one sister.

He commenced study on a degree at the University of Glasgow in 1967, but left after two years. While there, he encountered poets including Tom McGrath, Alan Spence, Aonghas MacNeacail and Philip Hobsbaum, and also acted as editor of the university magazine. Leonard returned to the university during the 1970s in order to complete a degree in English and Scottish Literature.

He joined a group of new and distinctive authors, including Philip Hobsbaum, Alasdair Gray, Liz Lochhead, James Kelman, Aonghas MacNeacail and Jeff Torrington, of whom Hobsbaum was the nucleus.

With Alasdair Gray and James Kelman, Leonard became Professor of Creative Writing at the University of Glasgow in 2001, retiring in 2009. He died at his home in Glasgow in December 2018, aged 74.

== Work ==
=== Poetry ===
Published in 1969, his Six Glasgow Poems has been called 'epoch-making'. The poems were first published as an insert in Glasgow University Magazine.

In 1984, he released Intimate Voices, a selection of his work from 1965 onwards including poems and essays on William Carlos Williams and "the nature of hierarchical diction in Britain." It shared the award for Scottish Book of the Year, and was banned from Central Region school libraries. Peter Manson, in the Poetry Review, claimed the poems, "speak so precisely and with such a fierce, analytical wit that they transcend their status as poems and become part of the shared apparatus we use to think with. I don't know any other contemporary poetry of which that is so true."

His arguably best-known poem, "The Six O'Clock News" from Unrelated Incidents, at one stage was compulsory study for an AQA English Language GCSE qualification in England, Wales, and Northern Ireland.

Access to the Silence (2004) compiles his poetic and poster works from 1984 to 2003, exploring the experimental and the surreal to a greater degree without losing any of his truthfulness or openness.

In 2009, Leonard released Outside the Narrative, a collection of his poetry from 1965 to 2009.

=== Literary criticism ===
Leonard, in his corpus, was highly critical of the effect of formal education on literature. In The Proof of the Mince Pie he argues that literature exams in schools and universities reduce art to a kind of "property" that is to be "acquired", with exams being the venue in which students present evidence of their acquisition.

In Poetry, Schools, Place he argued that exams also have the effect of marginalising traditions of poetry for which a gradable vocabulary of criticism has yet to be worked out. These are said to be traditions of poetry that have emerged since the First World War that do not see poems as "treasure chests of valuables" that the student may remove one by one and display to the examiner.

In his introduction to Radical Renfrew, Leonard discussed the impact that formal education has had in creating a "canon" of literature that excludes vast amounts of literature deemed inappropriate for teaching. He suggests that the teaching of poetry has the effect of installing in people's minds the idea that a "real" poem is one that an English teacher would approve for use in a class and that requires explanation and guidance from such a teacher. The effect is the view that the 'best' poems are those that come to be set in exams and that the people best able to pass these exams will be the people best able to understand and write poetry.

Leonard traced these views back to the nineteenth-century invention of literature as a "subject" in schools. This involved the creation of a canon of "set books", overseen by central authorities that ensure the canon embodies desirable social, moral and political values. Literature that is not considered to embody these values is excluded, along with works thought to belong to another "subject" in the curriculum.

=== Other writings ===
Outside of publishing his own work as a poet, Leonard worked on various compilations of other poet's work, in addition to occasional forays into prose and fiction.

Whilst working as Writer in Residence at Renfrew District Libraries in 1988, Leonard compiled Radical Renfrew: Poetry from the French Revolution to the First World War, an anthology of poetry which sought to resurrect the work of long forgotten poets from the West of Scotland and disprove the belief that Scotland at that time was a cultural wasteland,, a belief perpetuated by claims such as those of T. S. Eliot, who once claimed that Scotland has no literary culture. Radical Renfrew wished to dispel this idea, and Leonard in his introduction suggests that in denying the existence of a native Scottish culture, the Scottish people have been denied "the right to equality of dialogue with those in possession of Queen's English or 'good' Scots."

In 1993, he released Places of the Mind, a biographical novel based on the seminal Scottish author James Thomson. Best known for his epic poem The City of Dreadful Night, Thomson's life and works are captured by Leonard in a study of poetry, alcoholism and freethinking.

His most overtly political work followed in 1995, as Leonard published another collection, entitled Reports From The Present. It compiles Leonard's corpus of work from 1982 to 1994, with the collection incorporating political satires, collages, essays, "antidotes, anecdotes and accusations" ranging from explorations of the differences between poetry and prose to scathing attacks on the forces of power that corrupt culture for financial or political gain.

He published Definite Articles: Selected Prose 1973–2012 in May 2013, a compilation gathering forty years of essays, articles, reviews and journal entries.

== Political views and activism ==
Alongside his literary output, Leonard was vocal on a number of political issues. In 1991, he published On the Mass Bombing of Iraq and Kuwait, Commonly Known as The Gulf War with Leonard's Shorter Catechism, in which he was highly critical of British and American involvement in Iraq and Kuwait during the Gulf War.

Leonard voiced his support for the cultural boycott of Israel in response to its policies towards Palestine. He co-signed a letter to the Glasgow Herald with writers including Liz Lochhead, A. L. Kennedy and Iain Banks, criticising the inclusion of Israeli dance troupe Batsheva in the 2012 Edinburgh International Festival.

He previously voiced support for an "independent Scottish Socialist Republic", but was opposed to the 2014 independence referendum, criticising the SNP and the referendum process on his journal.

== Selected bibliography ==
- Six Glasgow Poems (1969)
- A Priest Came on at Merkland Street (1970)
- Poems (1973)
- Bunnit Husslin (1975)
- Three Glasgow Writers (1976), with James Kelman and Alex Hamilton.
- Intimate Voices (1984)
- Radical Renfrew: Poetry from the French Revolution to the First World War (1990)
- On the Mass bombing of Iraq and Kuwait, commonly known as The Gulf War with Leonard's Shorter Catechism (1991)
- Places of the Mind (1993)
- Reports from the Present (1995)
- Access to the Silence (2004)
- Outside the Narrative: Poems 1965–2009 (2009)
- Definite Articles: Selected Prose 1973–2012 (2013)

== Reviews ==
- Kirkwood, Colin (1985), "Vulgar Eloquence: Tom Leonard's Intimate Voices, 1965 - 1983", in Parker, Geoff (ed.), Cencrastus No. 20, Spring 1985, pp. 21 - 24, ISSN 0264-0856
