= The Man He Killed =

Poem by Thomas Hardy

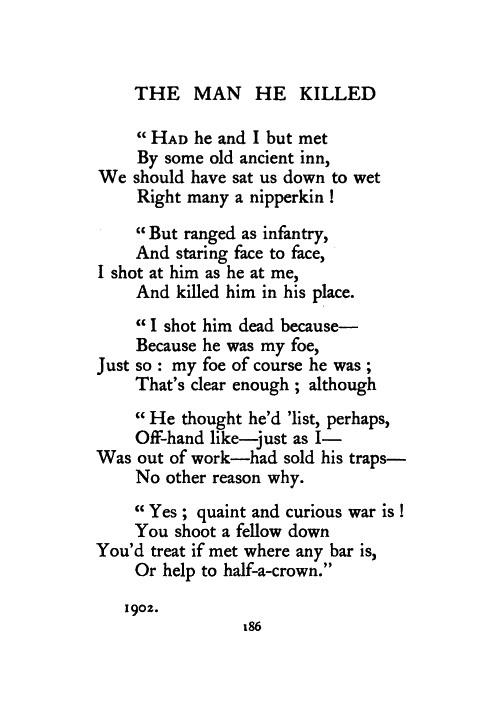
"The Man He Killed" as it appeared in a 1910 edition of Time's Laughingstocks and Other Verses

"The Man He Killed" is a poem written by Thomas Hardy. Written in 1902, it was first published in Harper's Weekly, Nov. 8 1902. The first book publication was in his Time's Laughingstocks and Other Verses (London: Macmillan, 1909).

== Analysis ==
=== Poetic structure ===
The poem is made up of short lines using a simple rhyme scheme and everyday language. These format choices make the poem almost like a nursery rhyme in its simplicity, providing an ironic contrast to its unpleasant subject. The heavy irony of terms compared to the events narrated in the poem contrast in purposeful ways that emphasize the senselessness of how war seems.

The poem's form is a dramatic monologue in the voice of a returned soldier. There are five stanzas with four lines, following a regular metre and an ABAB rhyme scheme in each stanza. The first, second and last line of each verse is about six syllables long. and the third line is a little longer with eight syllables. This gives the poem a sort of conversational tone, setting up the scene and portraying the dark themes of the poem. The rhyme allows the description to have a surreal quality and brings forth a dreamlike state of the soldier's mind. When the speakers start to think in the next stanza, the meter stays regular but the feeling changes dramatically with the repetition of words, the awkward pauses within the lines, the internal rhyme and the way when it ends with the word although. The soldier is confused and repeating the word at the end leaving the soldier in pieces.

=== Critical interpretation ===
The poem was written at the time of the second Boer War (1899-1902). The poem considers the irrational situation of war, and diminishing patriotic motives of the soldiers that meet one another on the battlefield. By giving his readers the perspective of an ordinary man’s life and experience, Hardy asked broader questions about the purpose of war in general. Hardy's own class origins were visible in this poem; where his own parents were from the middle and lower class, so that even as a rich and successful novelist, he could put himself in the perspective of ordinary people. Such as where the man in poem ponders about the motives of war. Also during this time Hardy and his wife, Emma, did not approve of the South African War like many other liberals- it gave Hardy doubts about the British Empire. To him, it seemed like the Boers were only defending their homes and land against the English. Overall, it made him question the purpose of killing others for the sake of war.

Hardy's poem reintroduces many war themes and has many similarities with other poems he has written. He reintroduces war scenarios such as the feeling of guilt and being immobilized by a feeling. He also describes and observes characters in close detail, which is consistent with many of his previous poems. This somber poem expresses the internal battles that soldiers face, particularly the regret he faces on a battle field. "The Man He Killed" has been interpreted and interchanged with the title "The Many He Killed" as the author attempts to make a point that this scenario happens frequently with soldiers. Soldiers progressively begin to have a harder time summoning the it-could-have-been-me scenarios of fate that have traditionally provided a warrior's haunted but honorable bottom-line consolation. Hardy argues this and emphasizes the fact that things could have been different in multiple ways throughout the poem.

"The Man He Killed" was one of several Hardy poems about war inspired by the Boer War and World War I. Others include "After the War", "The Eye of Waterloo", and "Drummer Hodge". His book Moments of Vision includes an entire section labeled "Poems of War and Patriotism".

== In popular culture ==
The poem was recited extemporaneously by ex-U.S. Representative James Symington during an on-camera interview in the final episode of Ken Burns's 1990 PBS miniseries, The Civil War.
