= A Difficult Birth, Easter 1998 =

Poem by Gillian Clarke

"A Difficult Birth, Easter 1998" is a poem by Gillian Clarke. The poem references the Good Friday Agreement, where Unionists and Nationalists in Northern Ireland agreed to engage in a peace process.
