= Lawrence Ferlinghetti =

American poet (1919–2021)

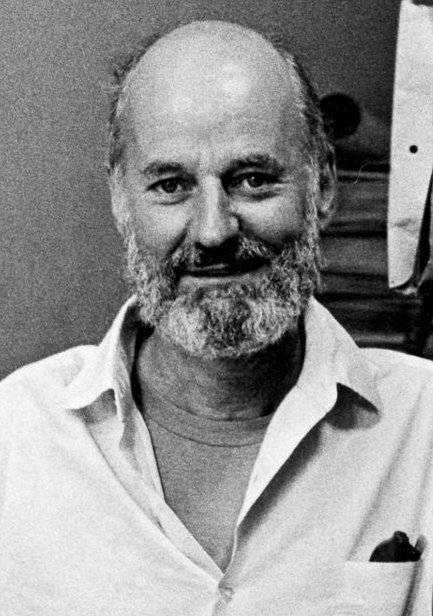
- Ferlinghetti in 1965
- Born: Lawrence Monsanto Ferling; March 24, 1919; Yonkers, New York, U.S.
- Died: February 22, 2021 (aged 101); San Francisco, California, U.S.
- Education: University of North Carolina at Chapel Hill (BA); Columbia University (MA); University of Paris (PhD)
- Occupations: Poet; activist; essayist; painter; publisher
- Spouse: Selden Kirby-Smith (m. 1951–1976)
- Children: 2
- Writing career
- Years active: 1940s–2021
- Movement: Beat poetry

Lawrence Monsanto Ferlinghetti (né Ferling; March 24, 1919 – February 22, 2021) was an American poet, painter, social activist, and co-founder of City Lights Booksellers & Publishers. An author of poetry, translations, fiction, theatre, art criticism, and film narration, Ferlinghetti was best known for his second collection of poems, A Coney Island of the Mind (1958), which has been translated into nine languages and sold over a million copies. When Ferlinghetti turned 100 in March 2019, the city of San Francisco turned his birthday, March 24, into "Lawrence Ferlinghetti Day".

== Early life ==
Lawrence Monsanto Ferling was born on March 24, 1919, in Yonkers, New York. Shortly before his birth, his father, Carlo Ferling (né Ferlinghetti), a native of Brescia, died of a heart attack; and his mother, Clemence Albertine (née Mendes-Monsanto), of Portuguese Sephardic Jewish descent, was committed to a mental hospital shortly after. Upon immigration to the United States, Carlo had shortened his surname, which Lawrence assumed and thus used it in his earlier works, until he knew his father's original surname through a birth certificate. By 1955, Lawrence reverted his surname to Ferlinghetti. Lawrence was raised by an aunt, and later by foster parents. He attended the Mount Hermon School for Boys (later Northfield Mount Hermon) graduating in 1937, then the University of North Carolina at Chapel Hill, where he earned a B.A. in journalism in 1941. He began his journalism career by writing sports for The Daily Tar Heel, and published his first short stories in Carolina Magazine, for which Thomas Wolfe had written.

He served in the U.S. Navy throughout World War II, as the captain of a submarine chaser in the Normandy invasion. In 1947, he earned an M.A. degree in English literature from Columbia University with a thesis on John Ruskin and the British painter J. M. W. Turner. From Columbia, he went to the University of Paris and earned a Ph.D. in comparative literature with a dissertation on "The City as Symbol in Modern Poetry: In Search of a Metropolitan Tradition".

== Personal life ==
Ferlinghetti met his wife-to-be, Selden Kirby-Smith, the granddaughter of Edmund Kirby-Smith, in 1946 aboard a ship en route to France. They were both heading to Paris to study at the Sorbonne. Kirby-Smith went by the nickname Kirby. Their marriage produced two children before ending in divorce.

== City Lights ==
He moved to San Francisco in 1951 and founded City Lights in North Beach in 1953, in partnership with Peter D. Martin, a student at San Francisco State University. They both invested $500. In 1955 Ferlinghetti bought Martin's share and established a publishing house with the same name. The first series he published was the Pocket Poets Series. He was arrested for publishing Allen Ginsberg's Howl, resulting in a First Amendment trial in 1957, where Ferlinghetti was charged with publishing an obscene work—and acquitted.

== Poetry ==
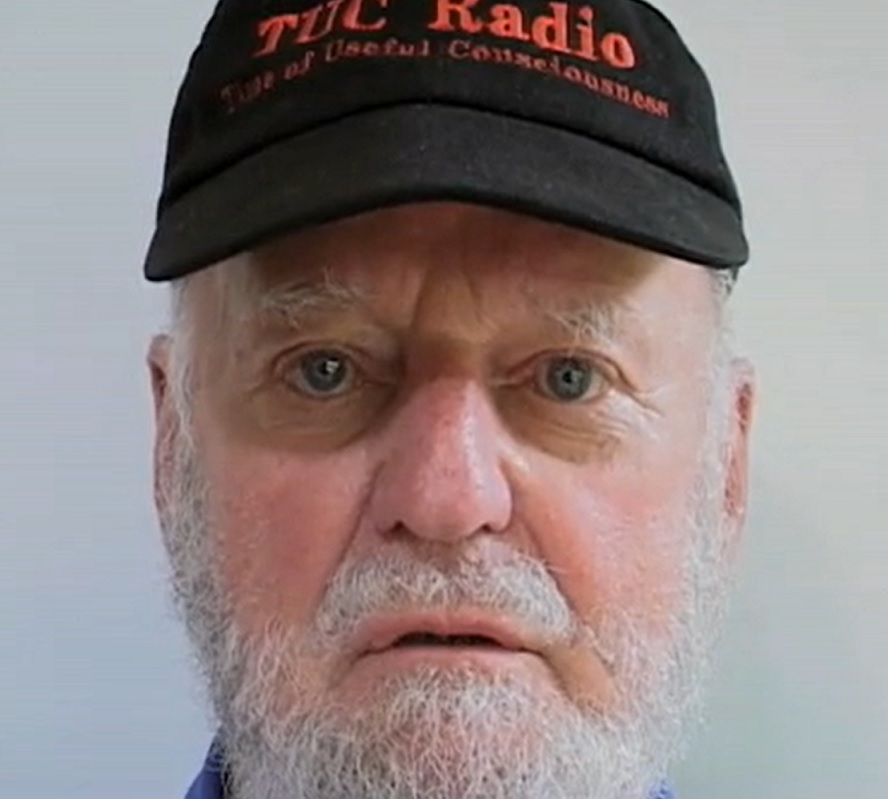
Lawrence Ferlinghetti in Speaking Portraits, 2009

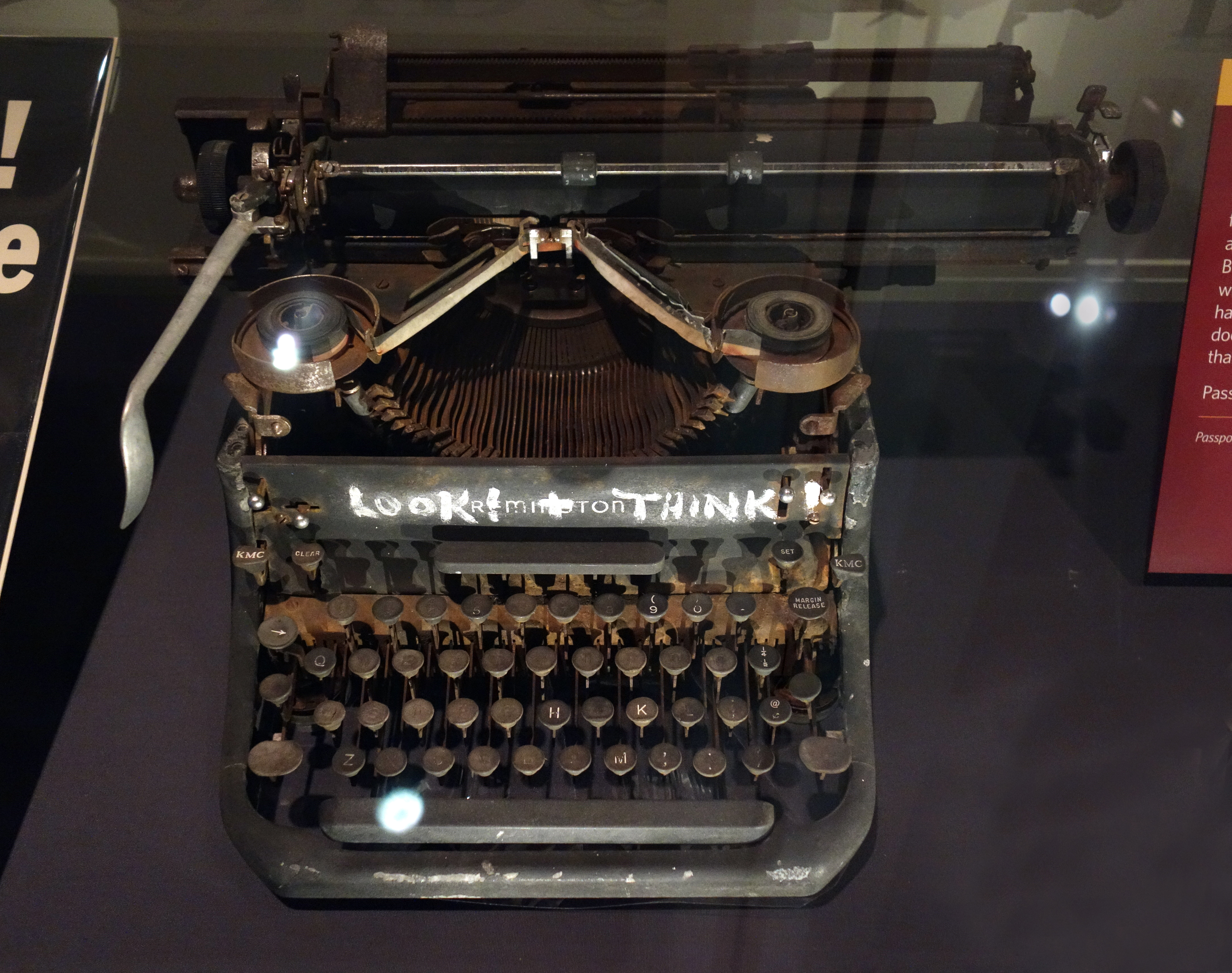
Ferlinghetti's typewriter, now in the National Museum of American History

If you would be a poet, create works capable of answering the challenge of apocalyptic times,
even if this meaning sounds apocalyptic.

You are Whitman, you are Poe, you are Mark Twain, you are Emily Dickinson and Edna St. Vincent Millay, you are Neruda and Mayakovsky and Pasolini, you are an American or a non-American, you can conquer the conquerors with words....

— Lawrence Ferlinghetti. From Poetry as Insurgent Art [I am signaling you through the flames].

Ferlinghetti published many of the Beat poets and is regarded by some as a Beat poet as well. But he did not consider himself a Beat poet, as he said in the 2013 documentary Ferlinghetti: Rebirth of Wonder: "Don't call me a Beat. I never was a Beat poet."

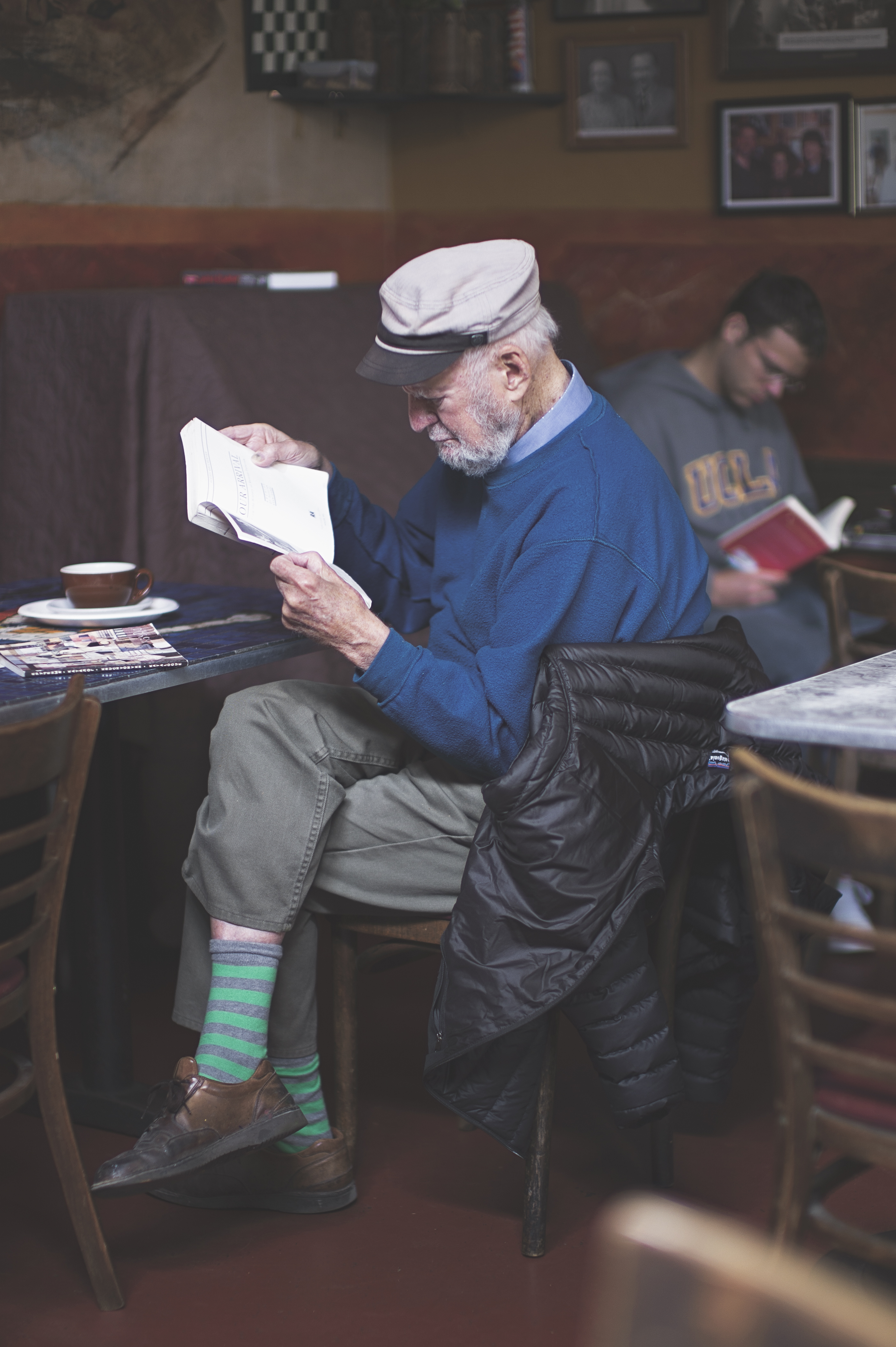
Lawrence Ferlinghetti in 2012 at Caffe Trieste

Ferlinghetti penned much of his early poetry in the vein of T. S. Eliot. Ferlinghetti told poet and critic Jack Foley, "Everything I wrote sounded just like him." Yet even in his Eliot-inspired poems such as "Constantly Risking Absurdity", Ferlinghetti is ever the populist as he compares the poet first to a trapeze artist in a circus and then to a "little charleychaplin man."

Critics have noted that Ferlinghetti's poetry often takes on a highly visual dimension as befits this poet who was also a painter. As Jack Foley notes, Ferlinghetti's poems "tell little stories, make 'pictures'." Ferlinghetti as a poet paints with his words pictures full of color capturing the average American experience as seen in his poem "In Golden Gate Park that Day: "In Golden Gate Park that day/ a man and his wife were coming along/ ... He was wearing green suspenders ... while his wife was carrying a bunch of grapes."

In the first poem in A Coney Island of the Mind entitled, "In Goya's Greatest Scenes, We Seem To See," Ferlinghetti describes with words the "suffering humanity" that Goya portrayed by brush in his paintings. Ferlinghetti concludes his poem with the recognition that "suffering humanity" today might be painted as average Americans drowning in the materialism: "on a freeway fifty lanes wide/ a concrete continent/ spaced with bland billboards/ illustrating imbecile illusions of happiness."

Ferlinghetti took a distinctly populist approach to poetry, emphasizing throughout his work "that art should be accessible to all people, not just a handful of highly educated intellectuals." Larry Smith, an American author and editor, stated that Ferlinghetti is a poet "of the people engaged conscientiously in the creation of new poetic and cultural forms." This perception of art as a broad socio-cultural force, as opposed to an elitist academic enterprise, is explicitly evident in Poem 9 from Pictures of the Gone World, wherein the speaker states: "'Truth is not the secret of a few' / yet / you would maybe think so / the way some / librarians / and cultural ambassadors and / especially museum directors / act" (1–8). In addition to Ferlinghetti's aesthetic egalitarianism, this passage highlights two additional formal features of the poet's work, namely, his incorporation of a common American idiom as well as his experimental approach to line arrangement which, as Crale Hopkins notes, is inherited from the poetry of William Carlos Williams.

Reflecting his broad aesthetic concerns, Ferlinghetti's poetry often engages with several non-literary artistic forms, most notably jazz music and painting. William Lawlor asserts that much of Ferlinghetti's free verse attempts to capture the spontaneity and imaginative creativity of modern jazz; the poet is noted for having frequently incorporated jazz accompaniments into public readings of his work.

== Political engagement ==
Soon after settling in San Francisco in 1951, Ferlinghetti met the poet Kenneth Rexroth, whose concepts of philosophical anarchism influenced his political development. He self-identified as a philosophical anarchist, regularly associated with other anarchists in North Beach, and sold Italian anarchist newspapers at the City Lights Bookstore. While Ferlinghetti said he was "an anarchist at heart", he conceded that the world would need to be populated by "saints" in order for pure anarchism to be lived practically. Hence he espoused what can be achieved by Scandinavian-style democratic socialism.

In the early 1960s, Ferlinghetti was a supporter of the Fair Play for Cuba Committee. On January 14, 1967, he was a featured presenter at the Gathering of the tribes "Human Be-In", which drew tens of thousands of people and launched what would become known as San Francisco's "Summer of Love". In 1968, Ferlinghetti signed the "Writers and Editors War Tax Protest" pledge, vowing to refuse to pay his Federal income tax as a protest against the Vietnam War.

In 1998, in his inaugural address as Poet Laureate of San Francisco, Ferlinghetti urged San Franciscans to vote to remove a portion of the earthquake-damaged Central Freeway and replace it with a boulevard:

"What destroys the poetry of a city? Automobiles destroy it, and they destroy more than the poetry. All over America, all over Europe in fact, cities and towns are under assault by the automobile, are being literally destroyed by car culture. But cities are gradually learning that they don't have to let it happen to them. Witness our beautiful new Embarcadero! And in San Francisco right now we have another chance to stop Autogeddon from happening here. Just a few blocks from here, the ugly Central Freeway can be brought down for good if you vote for Proposition E on the November ballot."

== Painting ==
Alongside his bookselling and publishing, Ferlinghetti painted for 60 years and much of his work was displayed in galleries and museums throughout the United States.

Ferlinghetti painted The beautiful Madonna of Sandusky Oh! hi! O! And friend during a 1996 visit to an art co-op in Sandusky, Ohio, which was subsequently vandalized and censored by a janitor the night after it was painted. Ferlinghetti responded to this act by painting a humorous retort on areas of the canvas where censorship had occurred.

A retrospective of Ferlinghetti's artwork, 60 Years of Painting, was staged in Rome and Reggio Calabria in 2010.

== Jack Kerouac Alley ==
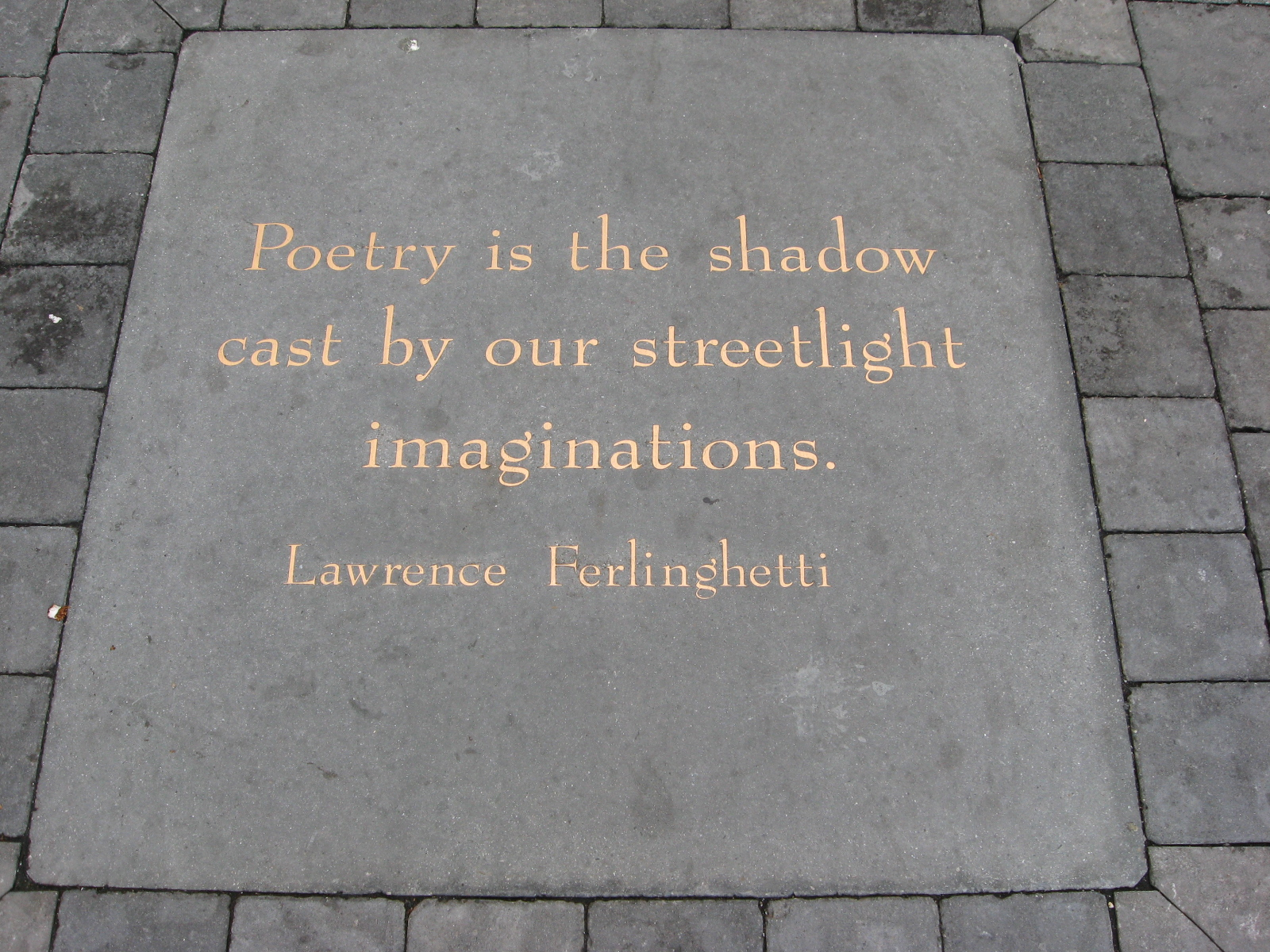
A sample of Ferlinghetti's work in San Francisco's Jack Kerouac Alley, adjacent to the City Lights Bookstore

In 1987, he was the initiator of the transformation of Jack Kerouac Alley, located at the side of his shop. He presented his idea to the San Francisco Board of Supervisors calling for repavement and renewal.

== Death ==
Ferlinghetti died of interstitial lung disease on February 22, 2021, at his home in San Francisco, a month before his 102nd birthday. He was buried in his family plot at Bolinas Cemetery in Bolinas, California.

== Awards ==
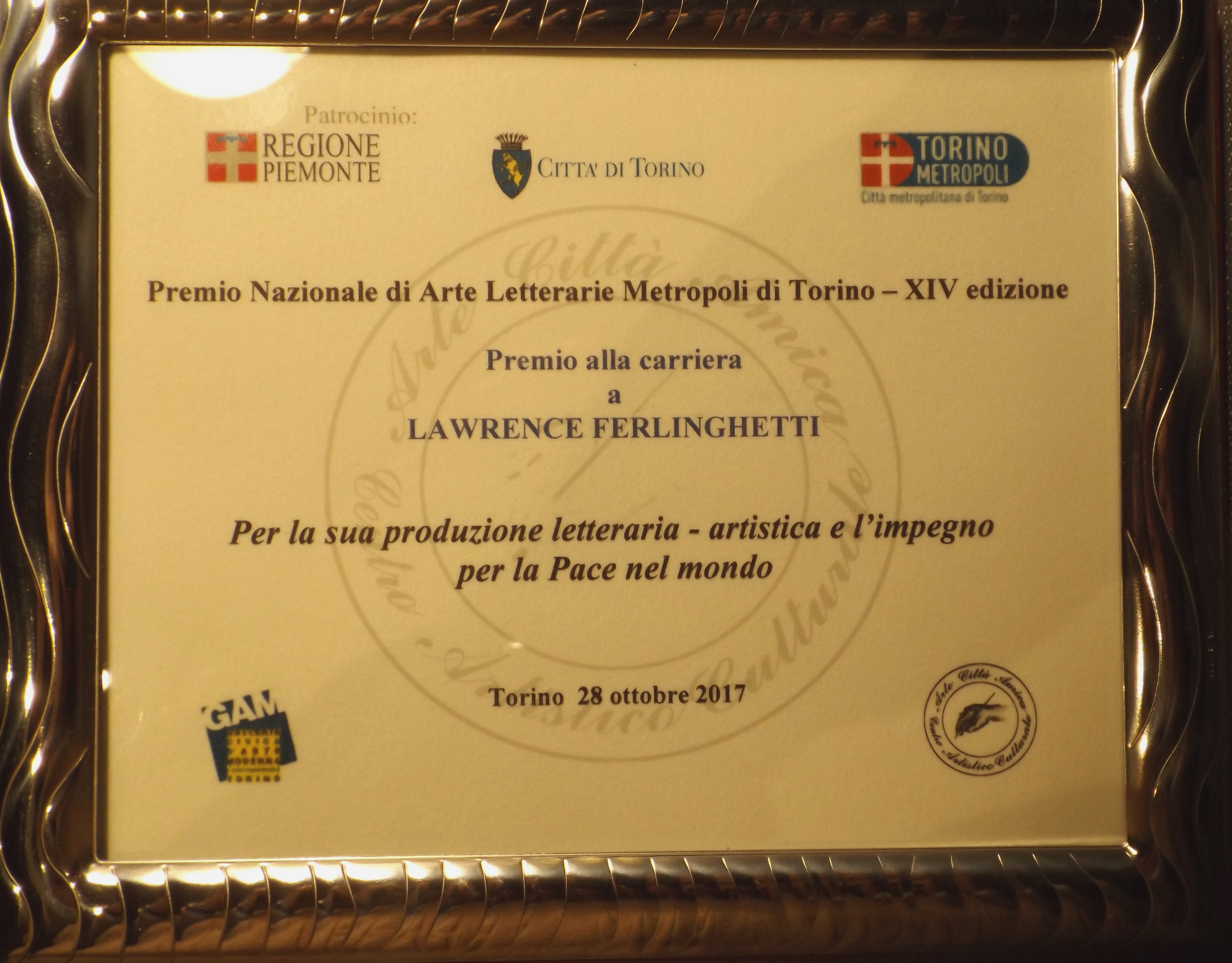
Career Award Plaque conferred on October 28, 2017, at the Premio di Arti Letterarie Metropoli di Torino, Italy

Ferlinghetti received numerous awards, including the Los Angeles Times' Robert Kirsch Award, the BABRA Award for Lifetime Achievement, the National Book Critics Circle Ivan Sandrof Award for Contribution to American Arts and Letters, and the ACLU Earl Warren Civil Liberties Award. He won the Premio Taormina in 1973, and thereafter was awarded the Premio Camaiore, the Premio Flaiano, the Premio Cavour, among other honors in Italy. The Career Award was conferred on October 28, 2017 at the XIV edition of the Premio di Arti Letterarie Metropoli di Torino in Turin.

Ferlinghetti was named San Francisco's Poet Laureate in August 1998 and served for two years. In 2003 he was awarded the Poetry Society of America's Frost Medal, the Author's Guild Lifetime Achievement Award, and was elected to the American Academy of Arts and Letters. The National Book Foundation honored him with the inaugural Literarian Award (2005), given for outstanding service to the American literary community. In 2007 he was named Commandeur, French Order of Arts and Letters. In 2008, Ferlinghetti was awarded the John Ciardi Award for Lifetime Achievement in Poetry. This award is handed out by the National Italian American Foundation to honor the author who has made the greatest contribution to the writing of Italian American poetry.

In 2012, Ferlinghetti was awarded the inaugural Janus Pannonius International Poetry Prize from the Hungarian PEN Club. After learning that the government of Hungary under Prime Minister Viktor Orbán is a partial sponsor of the €50,000 prize, he declined to accept the award. In declining, Ferlinghetti cited his opposition to the "right-wing regime" of Prime Minister Orbán, and his opinion that the ruling Hungarian government under Mr. Orbán is curtailing civil liberties and freedom of speech for the people of Hungary.

== In popular culture ==
Frank Zappa namedropped Lawrence Ferlinghetti as one of the people who influenced his band's music, in the sleeve of his debut album Freak Out! (1966).

Ferlinghetti recited the poem Loud Prayer at The Band's final performance; the concert was filmed by Martin Scorsese and released as a documentary entitled The Last Waltz (1978), which included Ferlinghetti's recitation. Andrew Rogers played Ferlinghetti in the 2010 film Howl. Ferlinghetti was the subject of the 2013 Christopher Felver documentary, Lawrence Ferlinghetti: A Rebirth of Wonder.

In 2011, Ferlinghetti contributed two of his poems to the celebration of the 150th anniversary of Italian unification, Song of the Third World War and Old Italians Dying inspired by the artists of the exhibition Lawrence Ferlinghetti and Italy 150 held in Turin, Italy (May–June 2011). On the book of lithographs The Sea Within Us first published in Italy as Il Mare Dentro in 2012, Ferlinghetti collaborated with lithographer and abstract artist James Claussen. Julio Cortázar, in his Rayuela (Hopscotch) (1963), references a poem from A Coney Island of the Mind in Chapter 121.

== Bibliography ==
- Pictures of the Gone World, (enlarged, 1995). San Francisco: City Lights. 1955.
- A Coney Island of the Mind. New Directions. 1958.
- Tentative Description of a Dinner Given to Promote the Impeachment of President Eisenhower (Golden Mountain Press, 1958) Broadside poem
- Her (New Directions, 1960) Prose
- One Thousand Fearful Words for Fidel Castro (City Lights, 1961) Broadside poem
- Starting from San Francisco (New Directions, 1961) Poetry (HC edition includes LP of author reading selections)
- Journal for the Protection of All Beings (City Lights, 1961) Journal
- Unfair Arguments with Existence (New Directions, 1963) Short Plays
- Where is VietNam? (Golden Mountain Press, 1963) Broadside poem
- Routines (New Directions, 1964) 12 Short Plays
- Two Scavengers in a Truck, Two Beautiful People in a Mercedes (1968)
- On the Barracks: Journal for the Protection of All Beings 2 (City Lights, 1968) Journal
- Tyrannus Nix? (New Directions, 1969) Poetry
- The Secret Meaning of Things (New Directions, 1970) Poetry
- The Mexican Night (New Directions, 1970) Travel journal
- Back Roads to Far Towns After Basho (City Lights, 1970) Poetry
- Love Is No Stone on the Moon (ARIF, 1971) Poetry
- Open Eye, Open Heart (New Directions, 1973) Poetry
- Who Are We Now? (New Directions, 1976) Poetry
- Northwest Ecolog (City Lights, 1978) Poetry
- Landscapes of Living and Dying (1980) ISBN 0-8112-0743-9
- Endless Life, Selected Poems (A New Directions Paperbook, 1981)
- Over All the Obscene Boundaries (1986)
- Love in the Days of Rage (E. P. Dutton, 1988; City Lights, 2001) Novel
- Wild Dreams of a New Beginning (New Directions, 1988) ISBN 978-0811210744
- A Buddha in the Woodpile (Atelier Puccini, 1993)
- These Are My Rivers: New & Selected Poems, 1955–1993 (New Directions, 1993) ISBN 0-8112-1252-1
- City Lights Pocket Poets Anthology (City Lights, 1995) ISBN 978-0-87286-311-8
- A Far Rockaway Of The Heart (New Directions, 1997) ISBN 0-8112-1347-1
- How to Paint Sunlight: Lyrics Poems & Others, 1997–2000 (New Directions, 2001) ISBN 0-8112-1463-X
- San Francisco Poems (City Lights Foundation, 2001) Poetry ISBN 978-1-931404-01-3
- Life Studies, Life Stories (City Lights, 2003) ISBN 978-0-87286-421-4
- Americus: Part I (New Directions, 2004)
- A Coney Island of the Mind (Arion Press, 2005), with portraiture by R.B. Kitaj
- Poetry as Insurgent Art (New Directions, 2007) Poetry
- A Coney Island of the Mind: Special 50th Anniversary Edition with a CD of the author reading his work (New Directions, 2008)
- 50 Poems by Lawrence Ferlinghetti 50 Images by Armando Milani (Rudiano, 2010) Poetry and Graphics ISBN 978-88-89044-65-0
- Time of Useful Consciousness, (Americus, Book II) (New Directions, 2012) ISBN 978-0-8112-2031-6, 88p.
- City Lights Pocket Poets Anthology: 60th Anniversary Edition (City Lights, 2015)
- I Greet You At The Beginning Of A Great Career: The Selected Correspondence of Lawrence Ferlinghetti and Allen Ginsberg 1955–1997. (City Lights, 2015)
- Pictures of the Gone World: 60th Anniversary Edition (City Lights, 2015)
- Writing Across the Landscape: Travel Journals, 1960-2010 (Norton, 2015) ISBN 978-1-63149-001-9
- Ferlinghetti, Lawrence (2019). Little Boy. Doubleday. ISBN 978-0385544795. Novel

== Discography ==
- Lawrence Ferlinghetti with Helium (1997). "Track 8: Dream: On A Sunny Afternoon ...". Kerouac: Kicks Joy Darkness. Rykodisc.
- Kenneth Rexroth & Lawrence Ferlinghetti (1957). Poetry Readings in the Cellar (with the Cellar Jazz Quintet) (LP). Fantasy Records. 7002.
- Lawrence Ferlinghetti (1958). The Impeachment of Eisenhower (LP). Fantasy Records. 7004.
- Lawrence Ferlinghetti (1970). Tyrannus Nix? / Assassination Raga / Big Sur Sun Sutra / Moscow in the Wilderness (LP). Fantasy Records. 7014.
- Lawrence Ferlinghetti (1999). A Coney Island of the Mind (LP). Rykodisc.
- Lawrence Ferlinghetti with David Amram (2005). Pictures of the Gone World. Synergy.
