= The Eagle (poem) =

Short poem by Alfred, Lord Tennyson

"The Eagle" (subtitled "Fragment") is a short poem by Alfred, Lord Tennyson, which was first published in 1851.

Reading of the poem "The Eagle"

== History ==
Alfred, Lord Tennyson lived during the Victorian Era during the 1800s. This era is widely known for the Romanticism movement in the literary culture. Tennyson was often referred as one of the main representatives of poetry during the Victorian era due to his growing popularity both during and after his time. Romanticism was a reaction to the Enlightenment, an intellectual movement which emphasized reason. Contrastingly, Romanticism as a whole valued feeling over thought, and was characterized by imagination, individualism, and freedom. Romantic poets often focused on the idea that nature is beautiful and that, to understand life, humans must appreciate nature. "The Eagle" shows Tennyson's appreciation of nature.

Although Tennyson has a reputation of a quiet, polite Englishman among other literary figures, he was once part of a small group who traveled to the border of Spain to deliver money and messages to Spanish Revolutionaries. While he did eventually fall out of the project, he came to enjoy the Pyrenees Mountain Range. This mountain range on the border of France and Spain came to be his favorite place, along with the nearby valley called the Cauteretz. "The Eagle" was inspired by Tennyson's frequent travels to the Pyrenees. He frequently saw eagles, raptors, and other birds of prey circling above him in this area. In the poem, Tennyson opted to create an imaginary setting of cliffs by the sea, instead of the mountainside. Tennyson is known for his imagery and transcendental vantage points.

== Analysis ==
Although iambic pentameter was the popular rhyme scheme of the time, Tennyson wrote this poem in iambic tetrameter. The end rhymes add to the lyrical sense of the poem and the soothing, soaring nature of the eagle. This poem is one of Lord Tennyson's shortest pieces of literature. It is composed of two stanzas, three lines each. Contrary to the length, the poem is full of deeper meaning and figurative language.

Often literary scholars believe the poem is short to emphasize the deeper meaning in nature itself, that the reader has to find himself. Tennyson's use of alliteration in the words clasps, crag and crooked (/k/) in the first line is meant to sound like a melody and makes it harder to pass over. This technique makes a reader stop and consider the meaning of the line; this also draws attention to the eagle, making it seem even more important than just a bird. He continually draws emphasis to the eagle, making it seem regal and better than the average human. This idea, of nature being better than humans, is a part of Romanticism.

The eagle is also referred to as a metaphor for someone in power, the political corruption. The "clasping with crooked hands" indicate the firm grasp of the powerful with malevolent hands, "close to the sun, lonely lands, ring'd with the azure world" indicate being close to extremely powerful leaders and the lack of genuine company. The "wrinkled sea" is indicated to be the common mass, "crawls" – trembling before the ruler, and that he watches everything happening from his high position. "And like a thunderbolt he falls" can be interpreted in two ways,

1. The preying upon of a person (political corruption) in a lower hierarchical position.
2. The sudden decline of a person in power.

Due to its title, the poem is generally considered an incomplete piece of work. However, some literary critics believe that the poem is, in fact, complete due to the overall symbolism within the poem. Scholars argued that the fragment is a symbol for the eagle due to the eagle "breaking away" from the mountain. They say that the fragment is vital to understanding the poem in the way that the mountain depicted is in fact the whole poem and the eagle, being a part of the mountains identity, is a loss when the eagle falls. The uncertainty of the poem being complete or incomplete reinforces the open ended question of what happens to the eagle at the end of the poem.

Another theory surrounding the poem is that the eagle represents Christians. The Eagle was written in 1851, the same year the Ecclesiastical Titles Act 1851 was passed in England making it a criminal offense for anyone outside the Church of England to use any episcopal title. Tennyson may have written the poem to represent how Catholics were strong and could separate themselves from the English government. "He clasps the crag with crooked hands" could represent how the eagle, or Catholics, held onto what they once had, the support of the government. "Close to the sun in lonely lands" could represent how Catholics were made to be illegal and were alone. "The wrinkled sea beneath him crawls; He watches from his mountain walls" shows how the government needed Catholics, based on Tennyson's writing. The English government suffered and "crawls" and the Catholics stand there watching this collapse happen. "Like a thunderbolt he falls" represents how the eagle, or Catholics, needs to stay strong and separate themselves from the beliefs of the English government.
