= Sujata Bhatt =

Indian poet (born 1956)

Sujata Bhatt (born 6 May 1956) is an Indian poet who is known for her works on identity, language, and culture. She was born in India but was exposed to diverse cultures through her global travels, which influenced her poetic expressions.

== Life and career ==
Sujata Bhatt was born in Ahmedabad, Gujarat and brought up in Pune, until she immigrated to United States with her family in 1968. She has an MFA from the University of Iowa, and for a time was writer-in-residence at the University of Victoria, Canada. She received the Commonwealth Poetry Prize (Asia) and Alice Hunt Bartlett Prize for her first collection Brunizem in 1987. She received a Cholmondeley Award in 1991 and Italian Tratti Poetry Prize in 2000. She has translated Gujarati poetry into English for the Penguin Anthology of Contemporary Indian Women Poets. Combining Gujarati and English, Bhatt writes "Indian-English rather than Anglo-Indian poetry." Michael Schmidt observed that her "free verse is fast-moving, urgent with narratives, softly spoken. Bhatt lives in Bremen, Germany with her husband, the German writer Michael Augustin, and daughter.

== Poetry collections ==
- 1988 Brunizem Carcanet Press
- 1989 The One Who Goes Away Carcanet Press
- 1991 Monkey Shadows Carcanet Press
- 1995 The Stinking Rose Carcanet Press
- 1997 Point No Point Carcanet Press
- 2000 Augatora Carcanet Press
- 2002 The Colour of Solitude (Second edition) Carcanet Press
- 2008 Pure Lizard Carcanet Press
