= The Falling Leaves =

Poem by Margaret Postgate-Cole

The Falling Leaves by Margaret Postgate-Cole

Today, as I rode by,

I saw the brown leaves dropping from their tree

In a still afternoon,

When no wind whirled them whistling to the sky,

But thickly, silently,

They fell, like snowflakes wiping out the noon;

And wandered slowly thence

For thinking of a gallant multitude

Which now all withering lay,

Slain by no wind of age or pestilence,

But in their beauty strewed

Like snowflakes falling on the Flemish clay.

The Falling Leaves is a poem written by Margaret Postgate-Cole (1893–1980) in November 1915 about World War I. Cole was an English atheist, feminist, pacifist, and socialist; her pacifist views influenced her poetry. Her brother was jailed for refusing to obey conscription. She wrote poems about World War I and against the government. In World War II she wrote propaganda poems in favour of the war.

The poem is calm and demonstrates that people on the home front during the war remained ignorant of what was happening on the Western front. The poem says, "I saw the brown leaves dropping from their tree". The leaves represent soldiers on the battlefield, who are left to rot, forgotten and lost forever. Another simile is "Like snowflakes falling on the Flemish clay." The snowflakes represent the soldiers, melting together, forgotten. The Flemish clay is the Belgian soil where the fighting took place. The snowflakes also represent how every soldier in the war was different.

This poem is included in the AQA GCSE Poetry Anthology "Moon on the Tides" for 2010 and 2011. It was also included in the OCR GCSE Poetry Anthology "Opening Lines" in the 1914-1918 WAR (ii), for 2006 to 2011.
