= Gillian Clarke =

Welsh writer and broadcaster

National Poet of Wales
- In office 2008 – March 2016
- Preceded by: Gwyn Thomas
- Succeeded by: Ifor ap Glyn

Personal details
- Born: 8 June 1937 (age 89)
- Occupation: Writer

Gillian Clarke (born 8 June 1937) is a Welsh poet and playwright, who also edits, broadcasts, lectures and translates from Welsh into English. She co-founded Tŷ Newydd, a writers' centre in North Wales.

== Life ==
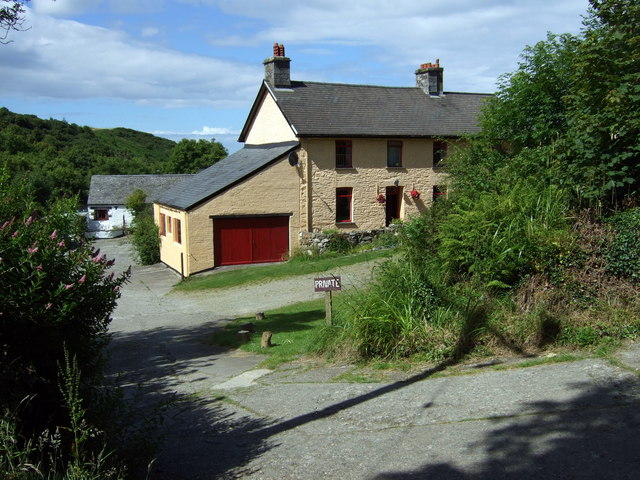
The house of Clarke's grandmother at Fforest Farm, near Fishguard

Gillian Clarke was born on 8 June 1937 in Cardiff.

== Career ==
After university, Clarke spent a year working for the BBC in London. She then returned to Cardiff, where she gave birth to her daughter, Catrin, and two sons. About Catrin she wrote a poem under her name. Clarke worked as an English teacher, first at the Reardon-Smith Nautical College and later at Newport College of Art.

In the mid-1980s she moved to rural Ceredigion, West Wales, with her second husband, after which she spent some years teaching creative writing at the University of Glamorgan. In 1990 she was a co-founder of Tŷ Newydd, a writers' centre in North Wales.

Her poetry is studied by GCSE and A Level students throughout the United Kingdom. A considerable number of her poems are used in the GCSE AQA Anthology. She has given poetry readings and lectures in Europe and the United States; her work has been translated into ten languages. Some of her English poems were translated into Chinese by Peter Jingcheng Xu and published in the journal Foreign Literature and Art (Issue 6, December 2016).

Clarke has published numerous collections of poetry for adults and children (see below), as well as dramatic commissions and articles in a wide range of publications. She is a former editor of The Anglo-Welsh Review (1975–84) and the current president of Tŷ Newydd. Several of her books have received a Poetry Book Society Recommendation. In 1999, Gillian Clarke received the Glyndŵr Award for an "Outstanding Contribution to the Arts in Wales" during the Machynlleth Festival. She was on the judging panel for the 2008 Manchester Poetry Prize. Clarke reads her poetry for teenagers who are taking their English GCSE school exams. She is part of the GCSE Poetry Live team that also includes John Agard, Simon Armitage, Carol Ann Duffy, Imtiaz Dharker, Moniza Alvi, Grace Nichols, Daljit Nagra and Choman Hardi.

In December 2013, Clarke was the guest on BBC Radio 4's Desert Island Discs. She has written over 100 poems during her career.

== Awards ==
Clarke was elected a Fellow of the Royal Society of Literature in 2000.

In 2008, Clarke became the third National Poet of Wales. She held the post until 2016, when she was succeeded by Ifor ap Glyn. In 2010 she was awarded the Queen's Gold Medal for Poetry and became the second Welsh person to receive the honour.

In 2011 Clarke joined the Gorsedd of Bards. In 2012, she received the Wilfred Owen Association Poetry award.

The book Ice was shortlisted for the T. S. Eliot Prize in 2012.

== Books ==
- Snow on the Mountain. (Christopher Davies), 1971
- The Sundial. (Gomer Press / Gwasg Gomer), 1978 ISBN 0-85088-540-X
- Letter From a Far Country. (Carcanet Press), 1982
- Selected Poems. (Carcanet Press), 1985 ISBN 0-85635-594-1
- Letting in the Rumour. (Carcanet Press), 1989 ISBN 0-85635-757-X
- The King of Britain's Daughter. (Carcanet Press), 1993 ISBN 1-85754-031-X
- Collected Poems. (Carcanet Press), 1997 ISBN 1-85754-335-1
- Five Fields. (Carcanet Press), 1998 ISBN 1-85754-401-3
- The Animal Wall. Illustrated, for children. (Gomer Press / Gwasg Gomer) 1999 ISBN 1-85902-654-0
- Nine Green Gardens. (Gomer Press / Gwasg Gomer), 2000 ISBN 1-85902-805-5
- Owain Glyndŵr. (National Library of Wales), 2000 ISBN 1-86225-015-4
- Making the Beds for the Dead (Carcanet Press) April 2004 ISBN 1-85754-737-3
- At the Source (Carcanet Press) May 2008 ISBN 978-1-85754-986-7
- A Recipe for Water (Carcanet Press) April 2009 ISBN 978-1-85754-988-1
- Ice (Carcanet Press October 2012) ISBN 978-1-847771-99-5
- Zoology (Carcanet Press July 2019) ISBN 978-1784102166
- Roots Home: Essays and a Journal (Carcanet Press March 2021) ISBN 978-1800170780
- The Hours (Broken Sleep Books April 2021) ISBN 978-1-913642-82-2 (limited to 100)
- The Silence (Carcanet Press May 2024) ISBN 978-1800173927

== See also ==
- Anglo-Welsh poetry
