= John Agard =

Guyanese playwright, poet and writer

John Agard FRSL
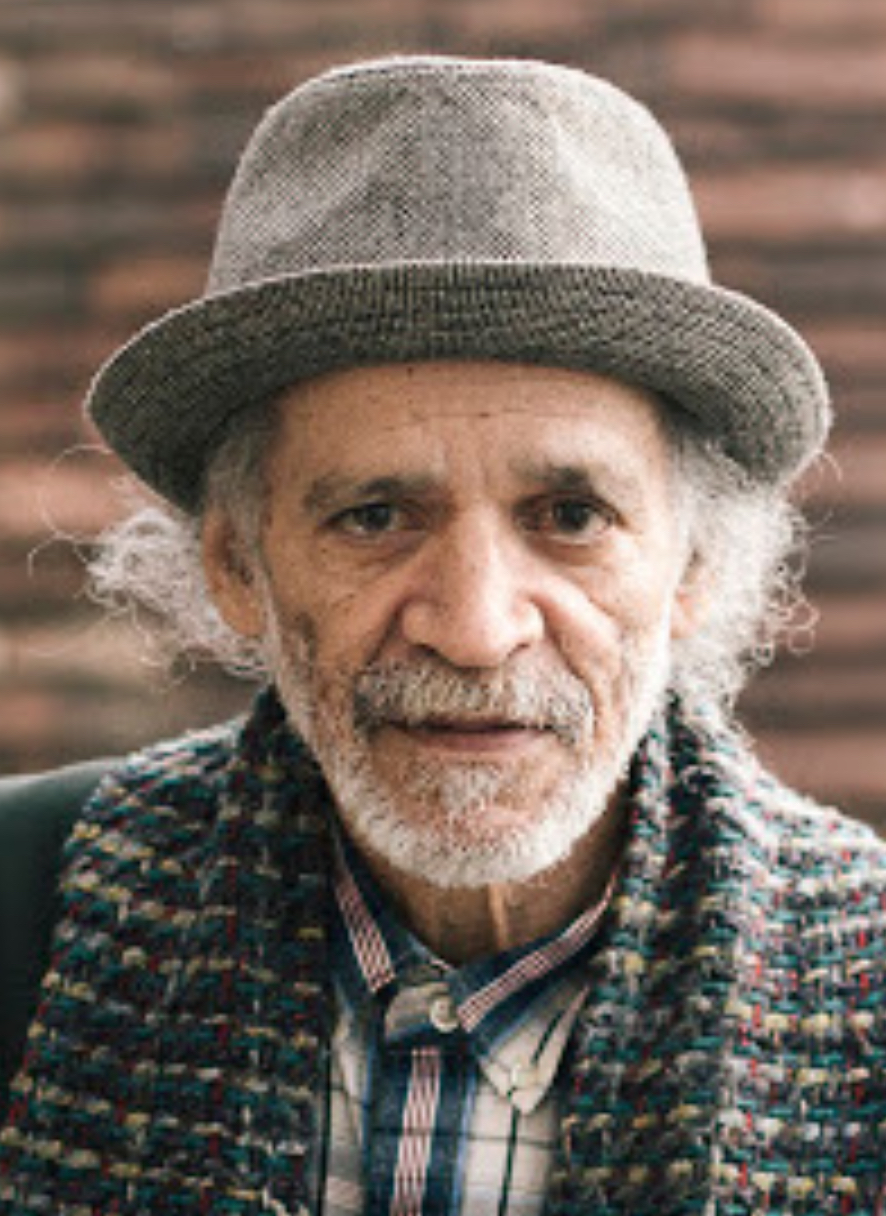
- Agard in 2025
- Born: 21 June 1949 (age 77); Grantham, British Guiana
- Education: St Alban's Academy
- Spouse: Grace Nichols
- Writing career
- Language: Patois
- Period: 20th century
- Notable awards: Paul Hamlyn Award for Poetry (1997); Cholmondeley Award (2004); Queen's Gold Medal for Poetry (2012)

John Agard FRSL (born 21 June 1949) is a Guyanese-born British playwright, poet and children's writer. In 2012, he was selected for the Queen's Gold Medal for Poetry. He was awarded BookTrust's Lifetime Achievement Award in November 2021.

== Biography ==
John Agard was born in British Guiana (now Guyana), and grew up in Georgetown. He loved to listen to cricket commentary on the radio and began making up his own, which led to a love of language. He went on to study English, French and Latin at A-Level, writing his first published poetry when he was in the sixth form, and left school in 1967. He taught the languages he had studied and worked in a local library. He was also a sub-editor and feature writer for the Guyana Sunday Chronicle, publishing two books while he was still in Guyana.

His father (Ted) settled in London and in 1977 Agard moved to Britain with his partner Grace Nichols, settling in Ironbridge, Shropshire. He worked for the Commonwealth Institute and the BBC in London.

His awards included the 1997 Paul Hamlyn Award for Poetry, the Cholmondeley Award in 2004 and the Queen's Gold Medal for Poetry in 2012. In November 2021 he became the first poet to be awarded BookTrust's Lifetime Achievement Award.

Agard was poet-in-residence at the National Maritime Museum in 2008. His poems "Half Caste" and "Checking Out Me History" have been featured in the Edexcel and AQA English GCSE anthologies respectively, meaning that many students (aged 13–16) have studied his work for their GCSE English qualifications. In the AQA English Literature Paper 2 which took place on 19 May 2026, students studying the Power & Conflict poetry anthology were asked to compare how Agard's poem 'Checking Out Me History' and 1 other poem from the cluster present strong emotions for 30 marks.

Archival literary records consisting of "letters and proofs relating to the published poetry works of John Agard" are held at Newcastle University Special Collections, in the Bloodaxe Books Archive.

Agard lives in Lewes, East Sussex, with his partner, the Guyanese poet Grace Nichols.

== Bibliography ==
- Listen Mr Oxford Don, 1967
- Shoot Me With Flowers. Georgetown, Guyana, 1974
- Letters for Lettie, and Other Stories. Bodley Head, 1978
- Dig Away Two-Hole Tim. Bodley Head, 1981
- Man to Pan. Casa de las Américas (Cuba), 1982
- I Din Do Nuttin, and Other Poems. Bodley Head, 1982
- Limbo Dancer in Dark Glasses. Greenheart, 1983
- Livingroom. Black Ink, 1983
- Mangoes and Bullets: Selected and New Poems 1972–84. Pluto Press, 1985
- Say It Again, Granny!. Bodley Head, 1986
- Lend Me Your Wings. Hodder & Stoughton, 1998
- Go Noah Go!. Hodder & Stoughton, 1990
- Laughter is an Egg. Viking, 1990
- The Calypso Alphabet. Collins, 1990
- No Hickory, No Dickory, No Dock (with Grace Nichols). Viking, 1991
- The Emperor's Dan-dan. Hodder & Stoughton, 1992
- A Stone's Throw from Embankment: The South Bank Collection. Royal Festival Hall, 1993
- The Great Snakeskin. Ginn, 1993
- Grandfather's Old Bruk-a-Down Car. Bodley Head, 1994
- Oriki and the Monster Who Hated Balloons. Longman, 1994
- The Monster Who Loved Cameras. Longman, 1994
- The Monster Who Loved Telephones. Longman, 1994
- The Monster Who Loved Toothbrushes. Longman, 1994
- Eat a Poem, Wear a Poem. Heinemann Young Books, 1995
- Get Back, Pimple!. Viking, 1996
- We Animals Would Like a Word With You. Bodley Head, 1996
- From the Devil's Pulpit. Bloodaxe, 1997 ISBN 1-85224-406-2
- Brer Rabbit: The Great Tug-o-war. Bodley Head, 1998
- Points of View with Professor Peekabo. Bodley Head, 2000
- Weblines. Bloodaxe, 2000 ISBN 1-85224-480-1
- Come Back to Me My Boomerang (with Lydia Monks). Orchard, 2001
- Einstein, The Girl Who Hated Maths. Hodder Children's Books, 2002
- Number Parade: Number Poems from 0–100 (with Jackie Kay, Grace Nichols, Nick Toczek and Mike Rosen). LDA, 2002
- Hello H2O. Hodder Children's Books, 2003
- From Mouth to Mouth (with Grace Nichols; illustrated by Annabel Wright). Walker, 2004
- Baby Poems. Frances Lincoln Children's Books, 2005
- Half-Caste. Hodder & Stoughton, 2005
- Butter-Finger (with Bob Cattell, illustrated by Pam Smy). Frances Lincoln Children's Books, 2006
- We Brits. Bloodaxe, 2006 ISBN 978-1-85224-733-1
- Wriggle Piggy Toes (with Jenny Bent). Frances Lincoln Children's Books, 2006
- Shine On, Butter-Finger (with Bob Cattell, illustrated by Pam Smy). Frances Lincoln Children's Books, 2007
- Checking Out Me History, 2007
- The Young Inferno (illustrated by Satoshi Kitamura). Frances Lincoln Children's Books, 2008
- Tiger Dead! Tiger Dead!: Stories from the Caribbean (with Grace Nichols, illustrated by Satoshi Kitamura). Collins Educational, 2008
- Alternative Anthem: Selected Poems (with DVD). Bloodaxe, 2009. ISBN 978-1-85224-823-9
- Clever Backbone.Bloodaxe, 2009 ISBN 978-1-85224-822-2
- The Young Inferno (illustrated by Satoshi Kitamura). Frances Lincoln Children's Books, 2009
- Goldilocks on CCTV (illustrated by Satoshi Kitamura). Frances Lincoln Children's Books, 2011
- Travel Light Travel Dark. Bloodaxe, 2013. ISBN 978-1-85224-991-5
- The Rainmaker Danced (illustrated by Satoshi Kitamura). Hodder Children's Books, 2017. ISBN 978-1444932607
- The Coming of the Little Green Man, 2018
- Shona, the Word Detective, 2018
- Books Make Good Pets, 2020
- Inspector Dreadlock Holmes and Other Stories, 2022

=== As editor ===
- Life Doesn't Frighten Me at All. Heinemann, 1989
- A Caribbean Dozen (co-edited with Grace Nichols). Walker Books, 1994
- Poems in My Earphone. Longman, 1995
- Why is the Sky?. Faber and Faber, 1996
- A Child's Year of Stories and Poems (with Michael Rosen and Robert Frost). Viking Children's Books, 2000
- Hello New!: New Poems for a New Century. Orchard, 2000
- Under the Moon and Over the Sea (co-editor with Grace Nichols). Walker Books, 2002

== Awards ==
- 1982: Casa de las Américas Prize (Cuba) for Man to Pan
- 1987: Nestlé Smarties Book Prize (shortlist) for Lend Me Your Wings
- 1995: Nestlé Smarties Book Prize (Bronze Award) (6–8 years category) for We Animals Would Like a Word With You
- 1997: Paul Hamlyn Award for Poetry
- 2004: Cholmondeley Award
- 2007: British Book Awards Decibel Writer of the Year (shortlist) for We Brits
- 2007: Elected a Fellow of the Royal Society of Literature
- 2009: Centre for Literacy in Primary Education poetry award for The Young Inferno.
- 2012: Queen's Gold Medal for Poetry
- 2021: BookTrust Lifetime Achievement Award
