= Daljit Nagra =

British poet (born 1966)

Daljit Nagra MBE FRSL
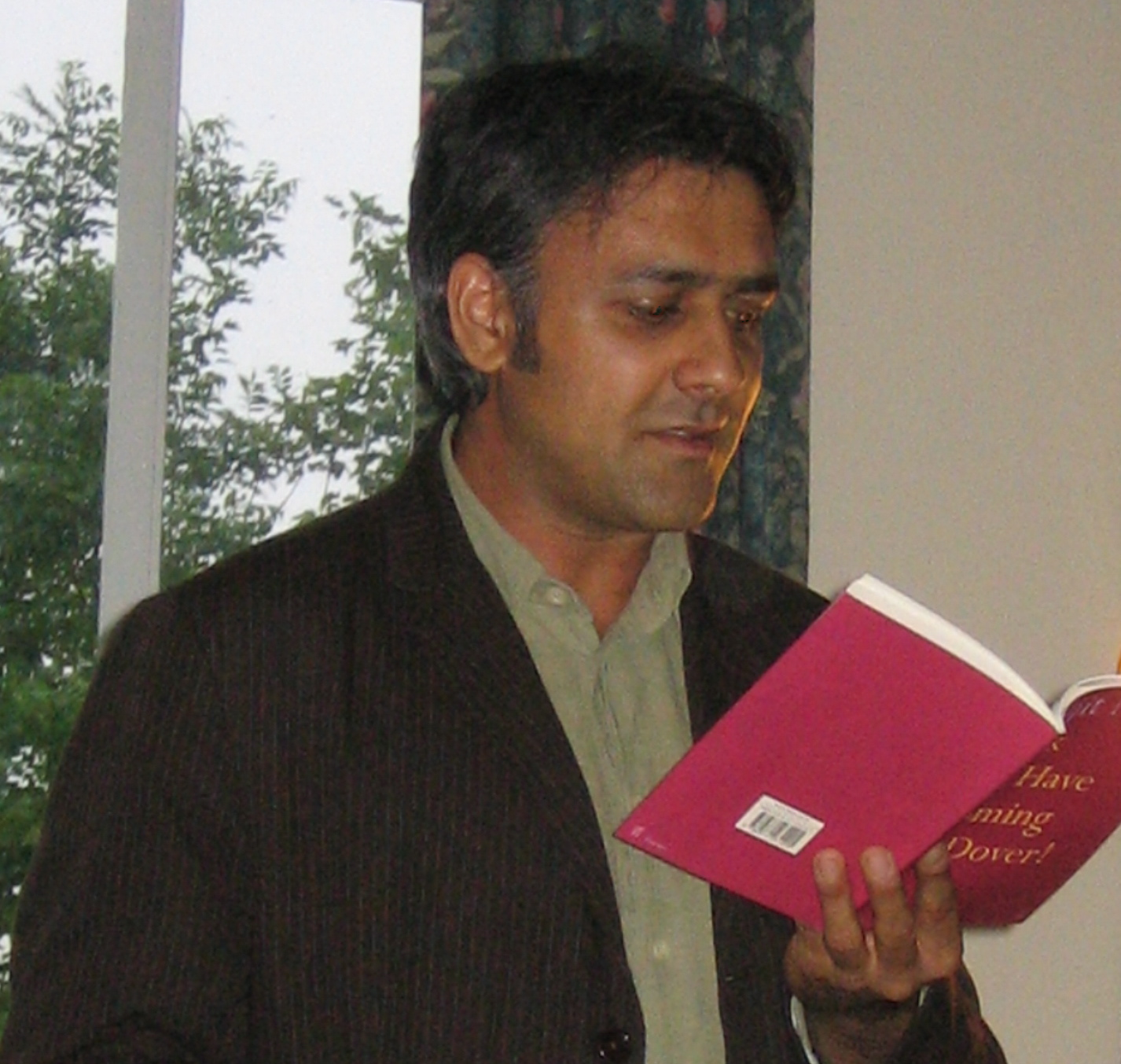
- At a poetry reading in 2007
- Born: 1966 (age 59–60); Hillingdon, England
- Education: Royal Holloway, University of London
- Occupation: Poet
- Writing career
- Notable work: Look We Have Coming to Dover! (2007)
- Notable awards: Forward Poetry Prize
- Website: www.daljitnagra.com

Daljit Nagra MBE FRSL (born 1966) is a British poet whose debut collection, Look We Have Coming to Dover! (based on a Poetry Book Society Pamphlet Choice of the same name) was published by Faber in 2007. Nagra's poems relate to the experience of Indians born in the UK (especially Indian Sikhs), and often employ language that imitates the English spoken by Indian immigrants whose first language is Punjabi, which some have termed "Punglish". He was the first poet in residence at the BBC and has served as chair of the council of the Royal Society of Literature. He is a professor of creative writing at Brunel University London.

== Early life and education ==
Daljit Nagra, whose Sikh Punjabi parents came to Britain from India in the late 1950s, was born at Hillingdon Hospital and grew up in Yiewsley, near London's Heathrow Airport. The family moved to Sheffield in 1982. In 1988, Nagra went to study for a BA and MA in English at Royal Holloway, University of London. Tentatively beginning to write, he later attended poetry workshops, courses and tutorials, receiving feedback from poets including Pascale Petit, Moniza Alvi, John Stammers, Carol Ann Duffy and Jackie Kay, and from 2002, being mentored by Stephen Knight.

== Poetry career ==
In 2003, Nagra won the Smith/Doorstop Books Pamphlet Competition, leading to the publication of his Oh MY Rub!, which was the Poetry Book Society's first PBS Pamphlet Choice.

In 2004, he won the Forward Poetry Prize for best single poem for "Look We Have Coming to Dover!", a title alluding to W. H. Auden's Look, Stranger!, D. H. Lawrence's Look! We Have Come Through! and by epigraph also to Matthew Arnold's "Dover Beach". His debut book-length collection, which takes the same title, was published in 2007, when it received extremely positive reviews and was featured on television and radio, including Newsnight Review. Look We Have Coming to Dover! won the 2007 Forward Poetry Prize for best first collection and the South Bank Show Decibel Award.

This was followed by Tippoo Sultan's Incredible White-Man-Eating Tiger Toy-Machine!!! (2012) which explored linguistic identity. In 2013 he published a creative translation of the Ramyana. In 2017 he published the collection British Museum which was said to break new and more political ground.

In October 2015, he became the first poet in residence for BBC Radio 4. From 2024, Nagra was the host of Poetry Extra on BBC Radio 4 Extra, a show which re-presented distinguished BBC radio programs about poetry.

His poem "Look We Have Coming to Dover" (2007), is used in the Edexcel "Poems of the Decade" A-Level qualification. His poem "Singh Song!" was added to the AQA English Literature GCSE love and relationships poetry specification in 2020.

In 2023, Nagra wrote a spoken-word piece that was performed by actor James Nesbitt at the Coronation Concert, to mark the coronation of Charles III and Camilla.

His poems have been published in the New Yorker, Atlantic Review, The London Review of Books, The Times Literary Supplement, Poetry Review, Poetry London, Poetry International, The Rialto and The North.

== Other activities ==
Nagra has been on the Board of the Poetry Book Society and the Poetry Archive. He has judged the 2008 Samuel Johnson Prize, the Guardian First Book Award 2008, the Foyle Young Poets of the Year Award 2008, the National Poetry Competition 2009, the 2010 Manchester Poetry Prize. and the Costa Book Award poetry category and overall winner in 2012. He has also hosted the T. S. Eliot Poetry Readings 2009. He was the Keats House Poet-In-Residence from July 2014 to June 2015, and he was an Eton College Wisdom Scholar in November 2014.In 2014, he won the Society of Authors Travelling Scholarship Award.

Nagra has acted as the Lead Poetry Tutor at the Faber Academy and has run workshops internationally. He is a contributor to BBC Radio, and has written articles for The Financial Times, The Guardian, The Observer, The Times of India. He teaches English at Brunel University.

In 2017, he was elected a Fellow of the Royal Society of Literature, and in 2020 was appointed chair of the Council. During his tenure the society made historic changes to improve the diversity of the fellowship. Following controversy, it was announced on 6 January 2025 that he would be leaving the position at the end of his four-year term, coinciding with RSL director Molly Rosenburg also stepping down after 15 years.

Nagra was appointed a Member of the Order of the British Empire (MBE) in the 2022 Birthday Honours for services to literature.

== Personal life ==
Nagra married a fellow student soon after graduating from university and had a daughter. Subsequently, Nagra met and married his current wife Katherine, with whom he has two daughters. During the 2000s, they lived in Dollis Hill, north-west London, before moving to Harrow in the 2010s.

== Bibliography ==
- Oh MY Rub! – Smith/Doorstop, 2003. ISBN 978-1902382548
- Look We Have Coming to Dover! – Faber & Faber, 2007. ISBN 978-0571231225
- Tippoo Sultan's Incredible White-Man-Eating Tiger Toy-Machine!!! – Faber & Faber, 2012. ISBN 978-0571264919
- Ramayana – Faber & Faber, 2013. ISBN 978-0571294879 (hardback); ISBN 978-0571313846 (paperback).
- British Museum – Faber & Faber, 2017. ISBN 978-0571333738 (hardback)
- Yiewsley – Faber & Faber, 2026. ISBN 9780571396559 (hardback)

== Interviews ==
- Anon. (6 October 2014). "Novelists are overrated". Writer at Work. India Today. 39 (40): 73.
