= Jack Hilton (writer) =

British writer

- Born: 21 January 1900; Oldham, Lancashire, England
- Died: 26 May 1983 (aged 83); Oldham, Greater Manchester, England
- Education: Ruskin College
- Occupations: Novelist, travel writer, essayist, plasterer
- Writing career
- Years active: 1930–1950
- Subjects: Working-class life, the labour movement, unemployment, socialism, polemic, autobiography
- Notable works: Caliban Shrieks; Champion; English Ways; Laugh At Polonius; English Ribbon

Signature
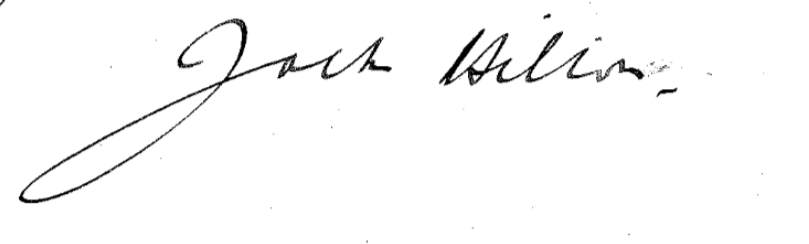

Jack Hilton (21 January 1900 – 26 May 1983) was a British outsider novelist and essayist adopted into the modernist movement of the 1930s. Hilton's works were experimental, using semi-autobiographical first-person narratives and internal monologue to probe the relation of events in his life - and the lives of his characters - to the feelings and attitudes of himself and his subjects. His writing was also unconventional at the time of its publication for its proud but critical depictions of working-class people and settings, centring on his native Lancashire.

Born into a large working-class family, Hilton grew up in a slum before starting work in a cotton mill at the age of eleven. He fought in the First World War before a period of several years as a vagabond. Upon settling in Rochdale in the latter half of the 1920s, he took up odd jobs in the building trade. During the Great Depression he began to organise for the National Unemployed Workers' Movement. After a protest in 1932 for which he was imprisoned in Strangeways, Hilton was barred by a magistrate from involvement in the organisation of future protests or political actions with the NUWM. He turned to writing instead, and soon afterwards a tutor of his at the Workers Educational Association stumbled upon a notebook containing drafts by Hilton. The tutor posted the texts to the modernist literary editor John Middleton Murry who invited Hilton to contribute to his magazine, The Adelphi. Hilton's contributions evolved into his debut novel Caliban Shrieks, published in 1935. A copy of this book was discovered in a working man's library in Oldham in 2021 and re-released by Vintage Classics in 2024.

Through the brief literary career that followed, Hilton became a good friend of the writers George Orwell and Jack Common. He disappeared from literature at the end of the Forties and returned to plastering, out of disillusionment with the publishing industry.

== Life ==
=== Early life ===
Hilton was born in Oldham but lived most of his life in and around Rochdale. Although his mother had many children, only four lived to adulthood. Hilton began working at an early age: at nine he worked before and after school as a "barber's lather boy and later as a grocer's errand boy." At twelve, he worked half time at a cotton mill as a "doffer" – a term used for young boys who replenished the spindles used by the older cotton spinners. He left school at fourteen and worked at various jobs until joining the army at sixteen. During the war he was injured in France, at which point he returned to Rochdale and became a plasterer. He remained a plasterer for the rest of his life and was an active member of the plasterers' union, which he joined in 1924. In June 1922, he married Mary Jane Parrott, a cotton mill worker. Mary continued to work in local cotton mills for the duration of their marriage.

=== Authorship ===
Hilton was often unemployed during the depression of the 1930s, and during this time he joined the Workers' Educational Association, where he began writing under the mentorship of W. H. Mason. At this time he was also active in the National Unemployed Workers' Movement, and was arrested at an NUWM demonstration. He was held in prison for twelve days, then released on the condition that he not speak in public for three years. During this time of enforced silence, he finished his first book, Caliban Shrieks, which was published in 1935 by Cobden Sanderson. He then attended Ruskin College for two years on a Cassel scholarship. In late 1937 and early 1938, he published a series of autobiographical essays in The Adelphi, a literary journal edited by John Middleton Murry. 1938 also saw the publication of his first novel, Champion, by Jonathan Cape.

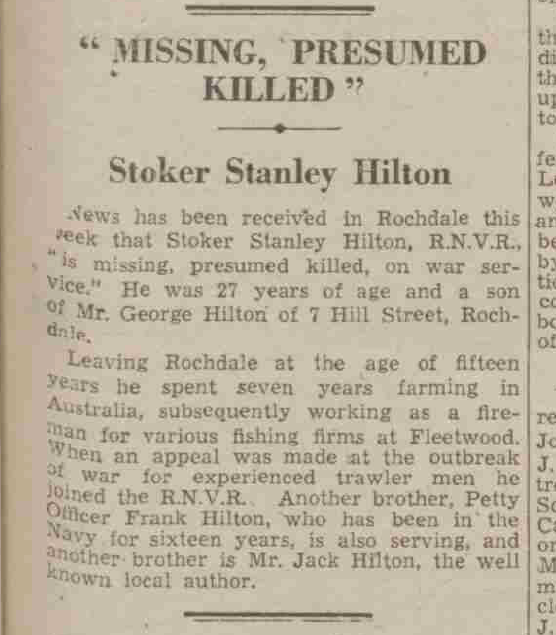
The obituary for Hilton's brother, Stanley, killed at sea in 1941. Hilton is mentioned as a "well known local author."

In 1938, Hilton was approached by Jonathan Cape about writing a travel narrative, offering him a £50 advance to fund the trip and £50 upon completion of his book. Hilton accepted the proposal, and in May of that year he and his wife Mary packed their belongings in a large pram and spent six months walking through "northern and midland industrial regions and cities such as Sheffield, Leicester, the Potteries and Birmingham; the home counties by way of Epsom and Buckinghamshire; and Bristol, Stroud and Devon in the west country." Throughout the journey they visited working-class districts and interviewed workers in various industries about their working and living conditions. The couple camped in a tent on the side of the road, occasionally staying in the homes of fellow union members. The couple returned to Rochdale in October 1938, at which time Jack wrote up his notes from their journey. His account of their trip was published in 1940 as English Ways: A Walk from the Pennines to Epsom Downs in 1939.

After writing English Ways, Hilton returned to fiction, publishing his second novel, Laugh at Polonius; or Yet, There is Woman in 1942. His youngest brother, Stanley Hilton, died at sea in 1941, when the trawler Arctic Trapper, on which he was a stoker, was attacked by German planes and foundered. After the war, Hilton struggled to get his work published. Nevertheless, he continued writing throughout his life and published short stories and essays in magazines whenever possible. In 1949 he was hired to re-walk the same trip he took for English Ways and report on the "changes and improvements in post-war Labour Britain." The resulting book, English Ribbon, was published in 1950; it would be his last major publication.

=== Later life ===
Hilton's father, George Hilton, died in 1952, and his wife Mary died on 11 February 1955. He married his second wife, Beatrice Alice Bezzant on 14 July 1956. Neither marriage produced children. Hilton died in Oldham.

== Major works ==
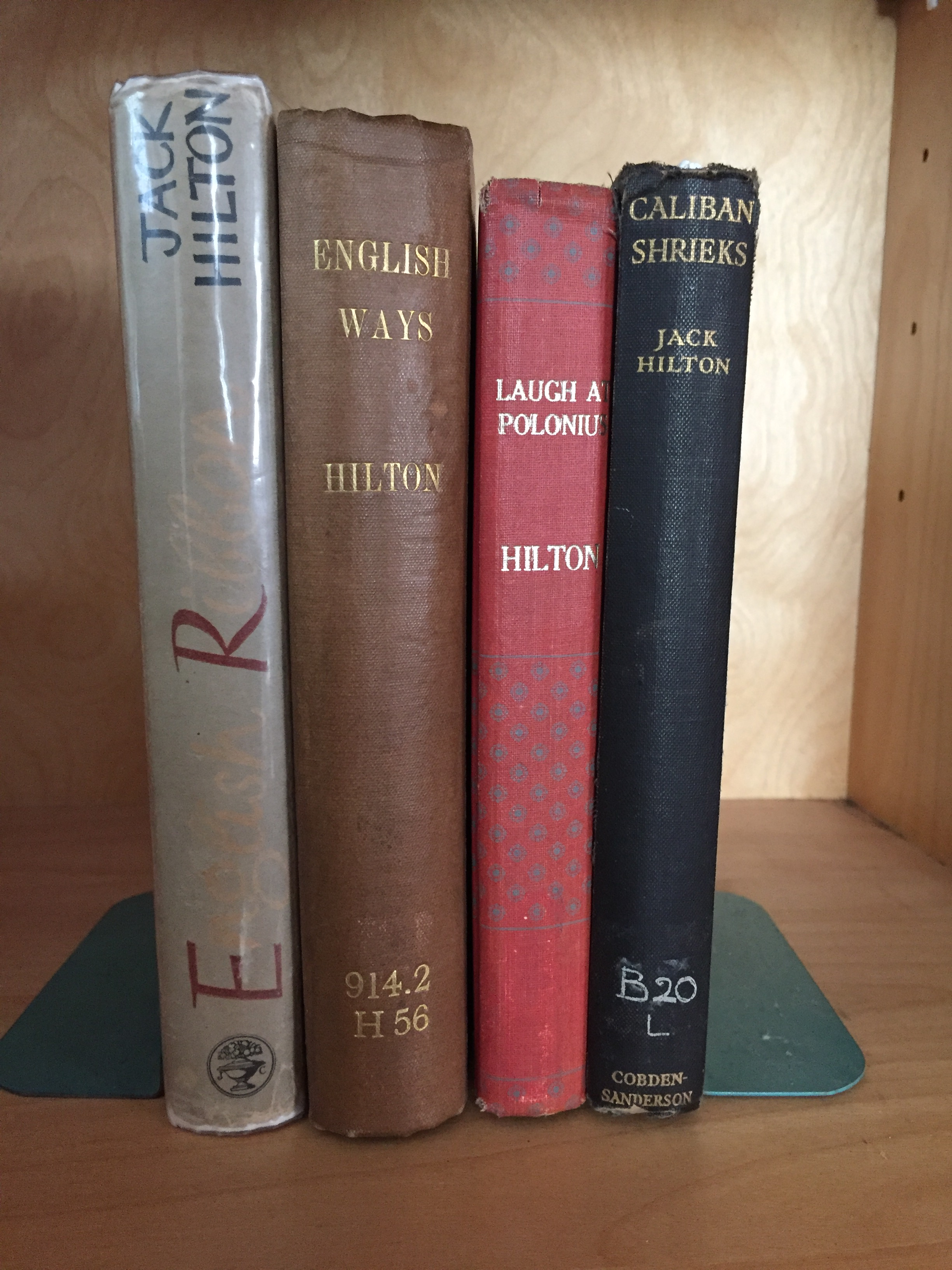
A collection of Hilton's books

=== Books ===
- Caliban Shrieks (1935)
- Champion (1937)
- English Ways: A Walk from the Pennines to Epsom Downs in 1939 (1940)
- Laugh at Polonius; or Yet, There is Woman (1942)
- English Ribbon (1950)

=== Essays ===
- "What Life Means to Me: The Credo of a Proletarian" (in five parts, The Adelphi 1937–8)
- "The Plasterer's Life" (in Seven Shifts, edited by Jack Common, 1938)
- "Hibernation" (The Adelphi, May 1938)
- "Queer Men, Dear Women" (The Adelphi, July 1938)
- "Poplar and Whitechapel" (The Adelphi, Feb. 1939)

== Reception ==
English Ways was met with generally positive reviews. The Times applauded Hilton's "beautifully evocative descriptions of the country." In The New Statesman, C. E. M. Joad described English Ways as "the most continuously interesting account of modern England that I have read, the best thing of its kind since Rural Rides." The reviewer for the Times Literary Supplement praised Hilton's ability to "see the world...through the eye of the artist as well as that of the artisan," and concluded that "Mr Hilton, with his zest for life, his honesty, humour and his angry outspokenness, has come very near to putting his finger upon the true pulse of England."

=== Relationship to George Orwell ===
Orwell reviewed Caliban Shrieks in The Adelphi in 1935. He praised Hilton for treating his "subject from the inside," providing his readers a "vivid notion of what it feels like to be poor", and accurately portraying the "voices of the innumerable industrial workers whom he typifies." Before travelling north to begin his research for The Road to Wigan Pier, Orwell wrote to Hilton asking for advice and lodging on his trip. Hilton was unable to provide him lodging, but suggested that he travel to Wigan, "for there are the colliers and they're good stuff."

Although he was partially responsible for Orwell's visit to Wigan, Hilton was not impressed by the Road to Wigan Pier. In his unpublished autobiography Caliban Boswelling, Hilton criticised the book, claiming that although Orwell "went to Wigan...he might well have stayed away" as he only "wasted money, energy and wrote piffle." Hilton claimed that Orwell "wanted to get at the pith but didn't know how, and failed," and as a result he produced "colour that wasn't worth the paint mixes." He blamed Orwell's failure partially on his inability to blend in with the working-class communities he visited, being a "tall, ex-officer type, Eton, modest, non-hard boozing, non-hard cursing, non-crude gamestering, no locale in the dialect sense."

Despite this disagreement, Orwell and Hilton continued corresponding and reading each other's work. "Orwell reviewed English Ways enthusiastically in the Adelphi in 1940 and discussed Hilton's work with Desmond Hawkins in 'The Proletarian Writer', broadcast on the BBC Home Service in December the same year and reprinted in The Listener." He repeatedly attempted to get Hilton's work published, introducing him to publishers and readers when he could.

== Legacy ==
Middlesex Polytechnic History Journal published a special issue on Hilton in 1985. It includes essays by Andy Croft, Dan Charlton, Clive Flea, and others, and contains a sample chapter of Caliban Shrieks. In addition to writing an article for the Middlesex Polytechnic special issue, Andy Croft mentions Hilton in his book Red Letter Days: British Fiction in the 1930s. Hilton also features in a chapter of Working-Class Writing: Theory and Practice. The Review of English Studies has published one article on Hilton and his relationship to George Orwell.

After Hilton's death, Croft advertised in the Rochdale Observer hoping to find any living relatives of Hilton's, but was unsuccessful. More recently, other scholars have tried to find the copyright holder for Hilton's works so they can be republished. Following the discovery of the copyright holder of Hilton's catalogue, Caliban Shrieks was republished in March 2024.
