= The Spike (essay) =

1931 essay by George Orwell

"The Spike" is a 1931 essay by George Orwell in which he details his experience staying overnight in the casual ward of a workhouse (colloquially known as a "spike") near London. This episode in Orwell's life took place while he was intentionally living as a vagrant in and around London as part of the social experiment that would form the basis of his first book Down and Out in Paris and London. The events of this essay are also found in that book, though the essay is not reprinted verbatim in the book.

Orwell was in Paris, in August 1929, when he first sent a copy of "The Spike" to the New Adelphi magazine. The New Adelphi was a London periodical which was owned by John Middleton Murry. Murry had released editorial control to Sir Richard Rees and Max Plowman, and it was Plowman who accepted the work for publication. However, various revisions were required, and the work did not appear in print until April 1931.

== See also ==
- George Orwell bibliography
