= Down and Out in Paris and London =

1933 memoir by George Orwell

- Cover of first edition
- Author: George Orwell
- Language: English
- Genre: Memoir
- Publisher: Victor Gollancz (London)
- Publication date: 22 January 1933
- Publication place: United Kingdom
- Media type: Print (hardback & paperback)
- Pages: 230
- ISBN: 015626224X
- OCLC: 6082214
- Followed by: Burmese Days

Down and Out in Paris and London is the first full-length work by the English author George Orwell, published in 1933. It is a memoir in two parts on the theme of poverty in the two cities. Its target audience was the middle- and upper-class members of society—those who were more likely to be well educated—and it exposes the poverty existing in two prosperous cities: Paris and London. The first part is an account of living in near-extreme poverty and destitution in Paris and the experience of casual labour in restaurant kitchens. The second part is a travelogue of life on the road in and around London from the tramp's perspective, with descriptions of the types of hostel accommodation available and some of the characters to be found living on the margins.

== Background ==
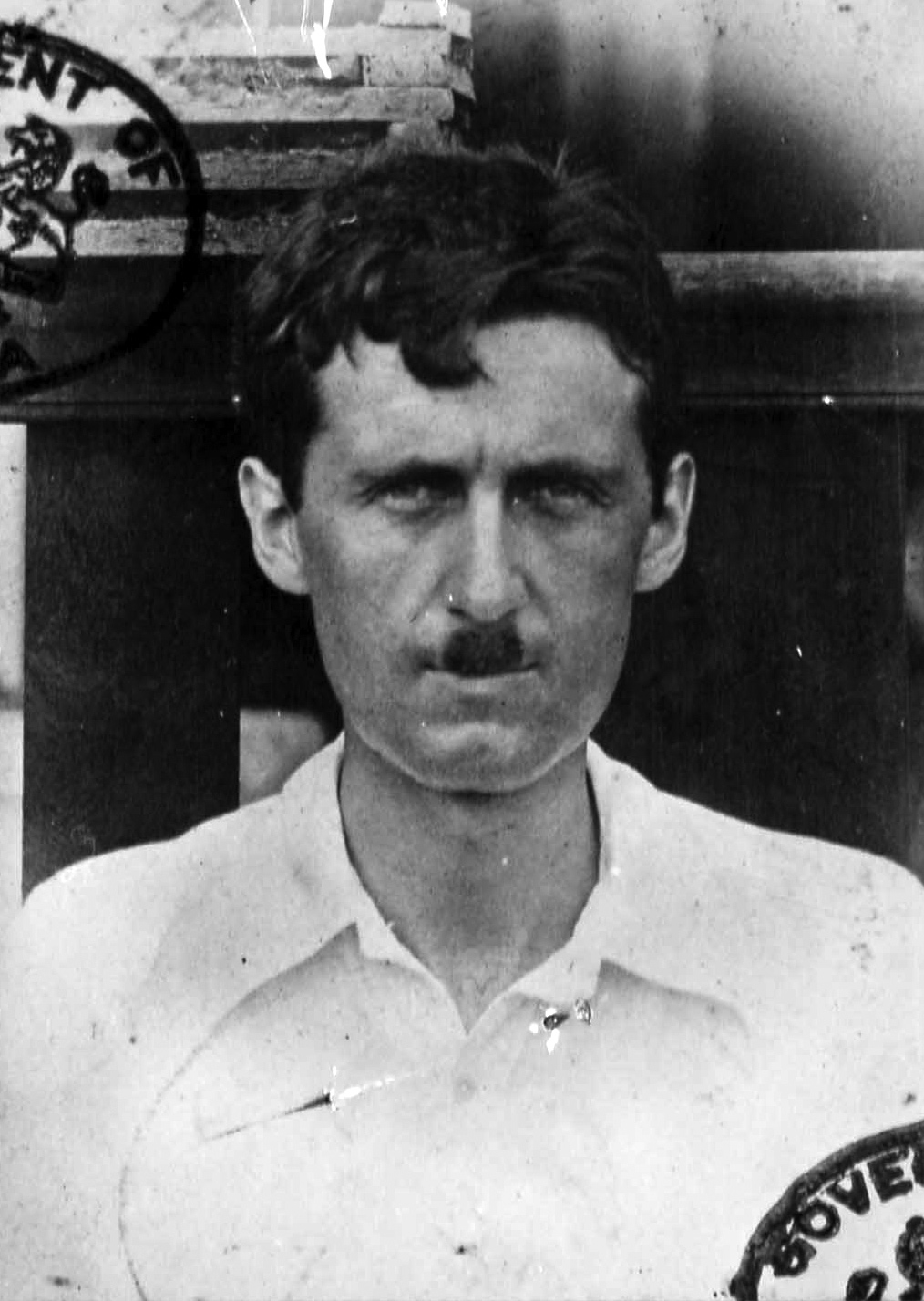
A passport photo of Orwell in the 1920s

After giving up his post as a policeman in Burma to become a writer, Orwell moved to rooms in Portobello Road, London at the end of 1927 when he was 24. While contributing to various journals, he undertook investigative tramping expeditions in and around London, collecting material for use in "The Spike", his first published essay, and for the latter half of Down and Out in Paris and London. In spring of 1928 he moved to Paris and lived at 6 Rue du Pot de Fer in the Latin Quarter, a bohemian quarter with a cosmopolitan flavour. American writers like Ernest Hemingway and F. Scott Fitzgerald had lived in the same area. Following the Russian Revolution, there was a large Russian emigre community in Paris. Orwell's aunt Nellie Limouzin also lived in Paris and gave him social and, when necessary, financial support. He led an active social life, worked on his novels and had several articles published in avant-garde journals.

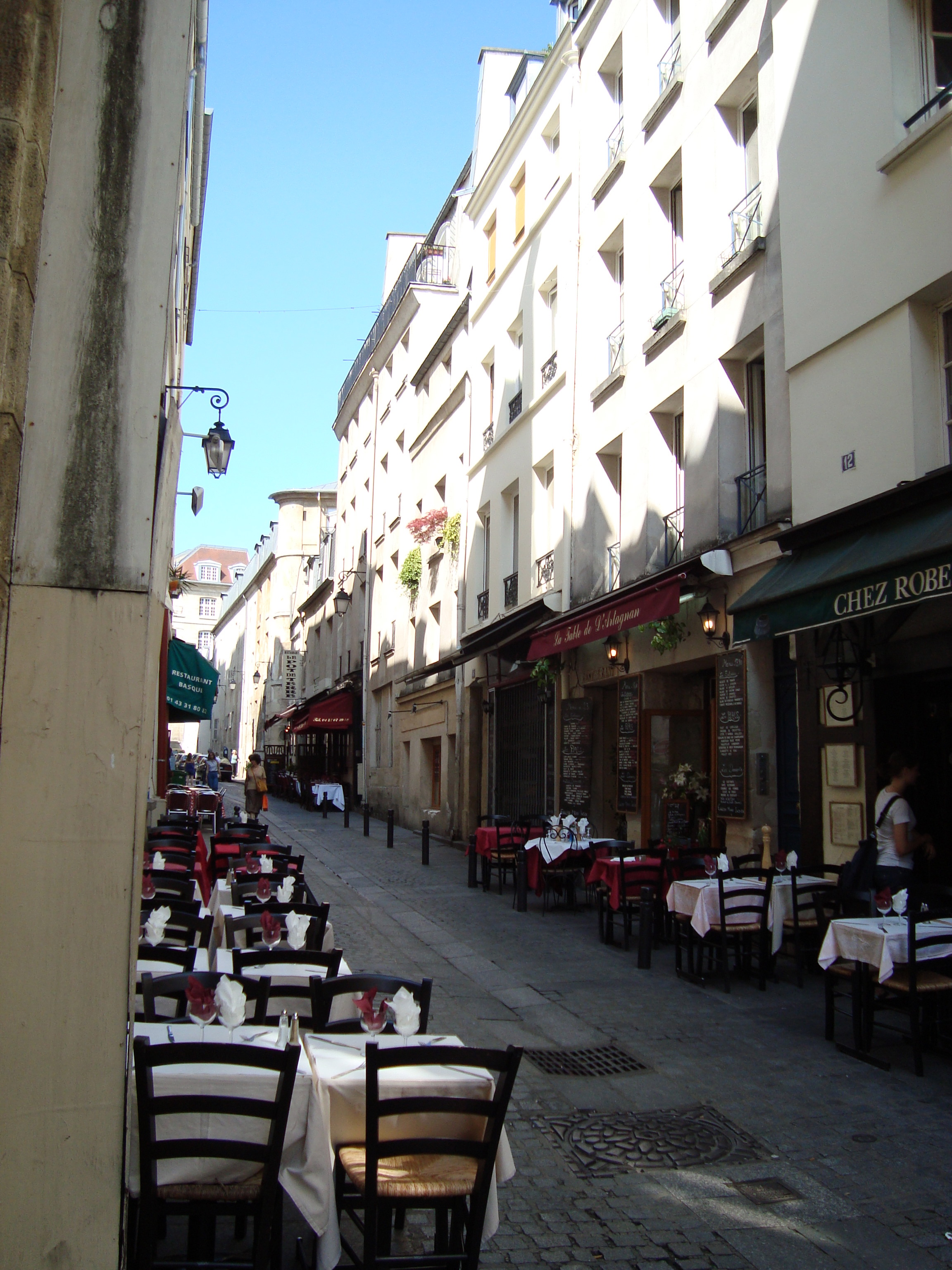
Orwell's Paris street, in the 5th arrondissement: "tall old-fashioned windows and dark grey leaded roofs; not far from the École Normale Supérieure—earlier in the twenties, Hemingway had lived only 500 yards (460 m) from Orwell's street; Elliot Paul was then still living in his own 'narrow street', the Rue de la Huchette, in the same arrondissement down by the river near the Place Saint-Michel; and once, at the Deux Magots in 1928, Orwell thought he saw James Joyce."

Orwell fell seriously ill in March 1929 and shortly afterwards had money stolen from the lodging house. In a later account, he said the theft was the work of a young woman whom he had picked up and brought back with him. Whether through necessity or just to collect material, and probably both, he undertook casual work as a dishwasher in restaurants. In August 1929 he sent a copy of "The Spike" to the Adelphi magazine in London, and it was accepted for publication. Orwell left Paris in December 1929 and returned to England, going straight home to his parents' house in Southwold. Later he acted as a private tutor to a disabled child there and also undertook further tramping expeditions, culminating in a stint working in the Kent hop fields in August and September 1931. After this adventure, he ended up in the Tooley Street kip, which he found so unpleasant that he wrote home for money and moved to more comfortable lodgings.

== Publication ==
Orwell's first version of Down and Out was called "A Scullion's Diary". Completed in October 1930, it used only his Paris material. He offered it to Jonathan Cape in the summer of 1931. Cape rejected it in the autumn. A year later he offered "a fatter typescript (the London chapters had been added)" to Faber & Faber, where T. S. Eliot, then an editorial director, also rejected it, stating, "We did find it of very great interest, but I regret to say that it does not appear to me possible as a publishing venture."

It was in the home of Mabel Fierz that Orwell then discarded the typescript. She had, with her husband, a London businessman named Francis, been for a number of years a visitor to Southwold in the summer and was on friendly terms with the Blairs. Fierz at this point took it to a literary agent, Leonard Moore, who "recognised it as a 'natural' for the new house of Gollancz." Victor Gollancz was prepared to publish the work, subject to the removal of bad language and some identifiable names, and offered an advance of £40. Orwell complained that one passage that Gollancz asked be changed or cut was "about the only good bit of writing in the book". The title improvised by Gollancz, Confessions of a Down and Outer, bothered Orwell. "Would The Confessions of a Dishwasher do as well?" he asked Moore. "I would rather answer to dishwasher than down & out." In July 1932, Orwell had suggested calling the book The Lady Poverty, in reference to a poem by Alice Meynell; in August 1932, he suggested In Praise of Poverty. At the last minute, Gollancz shortened the title to Down and Out in Paris and London. The author, after possibilities including "X," "P.S. Burton" (an alias Orwell had used on tramping expeditions), "Kenneth Miles" and "H. Lewis Allways" had been considered, was renamed "George Orwell." Orwell did not wish to publish under his own name Eric Blair, and Orwell was the name he used from then on for his main works—although many periodical articles were still published under the name Eric Blair. Down and Out in Paris and London was published on 9 January 1933 and received favourable reviews from, among others, C. Day Lewis, WH Davies, Compton Mackenzie and JB Priestley. It was subsequently published by Harper & Brothers in New York. Sales were low, however, until December 1940, when Penguin Books printed 55,000 copies for sale at sixpence.

A French translation, which Orwell admired, by RN Raimbault and Gwen Gilbert, entitled La Vache Enragée, was published by Éditions Gallimard, on 2 May 1935, with a preface by Panait Istrati and an introduction by Orwell.

== Summary ==
=== Chapters 1–23 (Paris) ===
The scene-setting opening chapters describe the atmosphere in the Paris quarter and introduce various characters who appear later in the book. From Chapter III to Chapter X, where the narrator obtains a job at "Hotel X," he describes his descent into poverty, often in tragi-comic terms. An Italian compositor forges room keys and steals his savings and his scant income vanishes when the English lessons he is giving stop. He begins at first to sell some of his clothes, and then to pawn his remaining clothes, and then searches for work with a Russian waiter named Boris—work as a porter at Les Halles, work as an English teacher and restaurant work. He recounts his two-day experience without any food and tells of meeting Russian "Communists" who, he later concludes, on their disappearance, must be mere swindlers.

After the various ordeals of unemployment and hunger the narrator obtains a job as a plongeur (dishwasher) in the "Hôtel X" near the Place de la Concorde, and begins to work long hours there. In Chapter XIII, he describes the "caste system" of the hotel—"manager-cooks-waiters-plongeurs"—and, in Chapter XIV, its frantic and seemingly chaotic workings. He notes also "the dirt in the Hôtel X.," which became apparent "as soon as one penetrated into the service quarters." He talks of his routine life among the working poor of Paris, slaving and sleeping, and then drinking on Saturday night through the early hours of Sunday morning. In Chapter XVI, he refers briefly to a murder committed "just beneath my window [while he was sleeping .... The thing that strikes me in looking back," he says, "is that I was in bed and asleep within three minutes of the murder [....] We were working people, and where was the sense of wasting sleep over a murder?"

Misled by Boris's optimism, the narrator is briefly penniless again after he and Boris quit their hotel jobs in the expectation of work at a new restaurant, the "Auberge de Jehan Cottard," where Boris feels sure he will become a waiter again; at the Hotel X, he had been doing lower-grade work. The "patron" of the Auberge, "an ex-colonel of the Russian Army," seems to have financial difficulties. The narrator is not paid for ten days and is compelled to spend a night on a bench—"It was very uncomfortable—the arm of the seat cuts into your back—and much colder than I had expected"—rather than face his landlady over the outstanding rent.

At the restaurant, the narrator finds himself working "seventeen and a half hours" a day, "almost without a break," and looking back wistfully at his relatively leisured and orderly life at the Hotel X. Boris works even longer: "eighteen hours a day, seven days a week." The narrator claims that "such hours, though not usual, are nothing extraordinary in Paris." He adds

by the way, that the Auberge was not the ordinary cheap eating-house frequented by students and workmen. We did not provide an adequate meal at less than twenty-five francs, and we were picturesque and artistic, which sent up our social standing. There were the indecent pictures in the bar, and the Norman decorations—sham beams on the walls, electric lights done up as candlesticks, "peasant" pottery, even a mounting-block at the door—and the patron and the head waiter were Russian officers, and many of the customers titled Russian refugees. In short, we were decidedly chic.

He falls into a routine again and speaks of quite literally fighting for a place on the Paris Métro to reach the "cold, filthy kitchen" by seven. Despite the filth and incompetence, the restaurant turns out to be a success.

The narrative is interspersed with anecdotes recounted by some of the minor characters, such as Valenti, an Italian waiter at Hotel X, and Charlie, "one of the local curiosities," who is "a youth of family and education who had run away from home." In Chapter XXII, the narrator considers the life of a plongeur:

[A] plongeur is one of the slaves of the modern world. Not that there is any need to whine over him, for he is better off than many manual workers, but still, he is no freer than if he were bought and sold. His work is servile and without art; he is paid just enough to keep him alive; his only holiday is the sack [.... He has] been trapped by a routine which makes thought impossible. If plongeurs thought at all, they would long ago have formed a labour union and gone on strike for better treatment. But they do not think, because they have no leisure for it; their life has made slaves of them.

Because of the stress of the long hours, he mails to a friend, "B," back in London, asking if he could get him a job that allows more than five hours' sleep a night. His friend duly replies, offering a job taking care of a "congenital imbecile," and sends him some money to get his possessions from the pawn. The narrator then quits his job as a plongeur and leaves for London.

=== Chapters 24–38 (London) ===
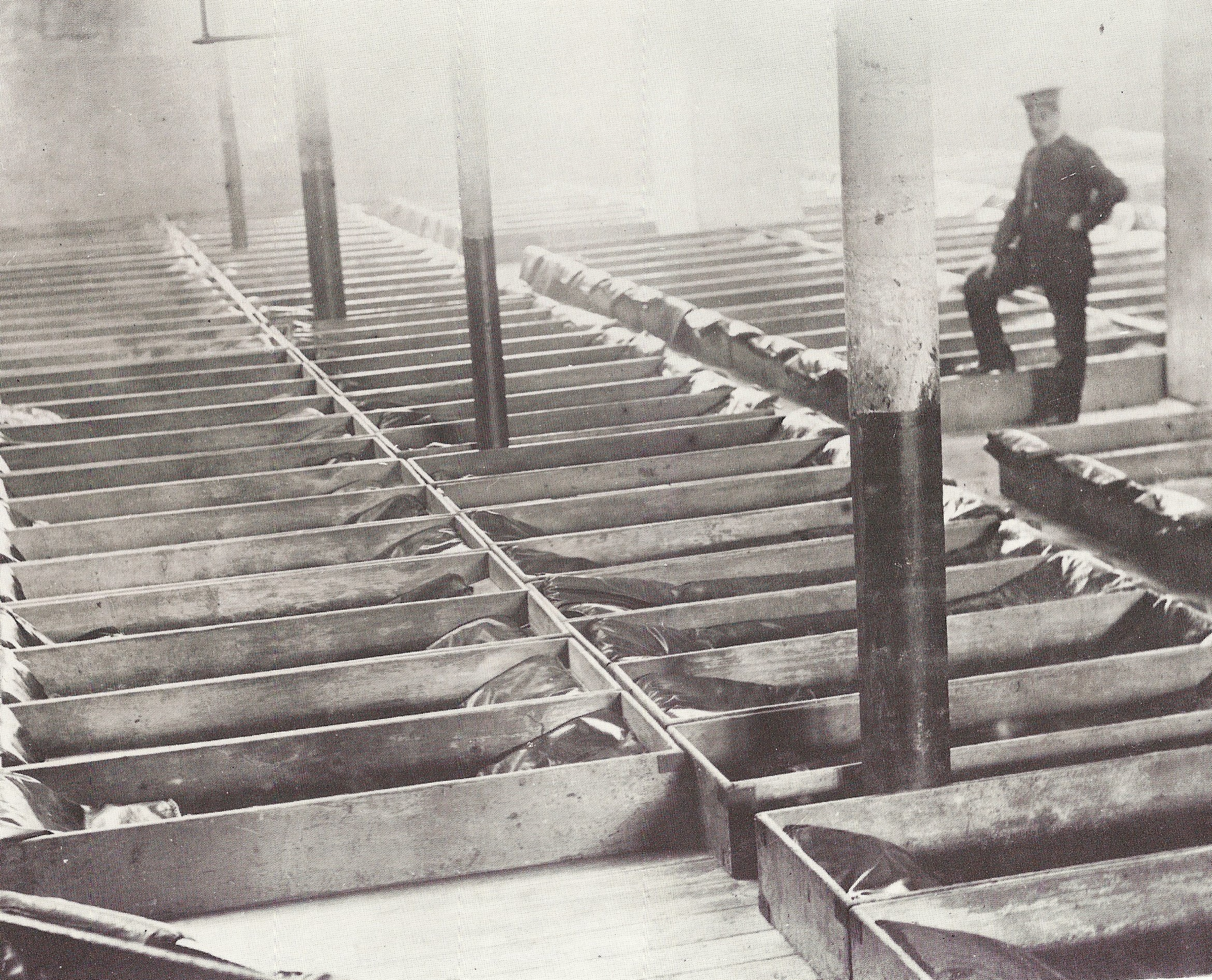
Orwell described the four penny coffin as an inexpensive and comparatively safe sleeping option for the poor of London.

The narrator arrives in London expecting to have the job waiting for him. Unfortunately the would-be employers have gone abroad, "patient and all."

Until his employers return, the narrator lives as a tramp, sleeping in an assortment of venues: lodging houses, tramps' hostels or "spikes," and Salvation Army shelters. Because vagrants can not "enter any one spike, or any two London spikes, more than once in a month, on pain of being confined for a week," he is required to keep on the move, with the result that long hours are spent tramping or waiting for hostels to open. Chapters XXV to XXXV describe his various journeys, the different forms of accommodation, a selection of the people he meets, and the tramps' reaction to Christian charity: "Evidently the tramps were not grateful for their free tea. And yet it was excellent [....] I am sure too that it was given in a good spirit, without any intention of humiliating us; so in fairness we ought to have been grateful—still, we were not." Characters in this section of the book include the Irish tramp called Paddy, "a good fellow" whose "ignorance was limitless and appalling," and the pavement artist from the Embankment, Bozo, who has a good literary background and was formerly an amateur astronomer. He has a "dreadfully deformed" right foot and has fallen prey to a succession of similar misfortunes, in his trade and his life.

The final chapters provide a catalogue of various types of accommodation open to tramps, including the four penny coffin. The narrator offers some general remarks, concluding,

At present I do not feel that I have seen more than the fringe of poverty. Still, I can point to one or two things I have definitely learned by being hard up. I shall never again think that all tramps are drunken scoundrels, nor expect a beggar to be grateful when I give him a penny, nor be surprised if men out of work lack energy, nor subscribe to the Salvation Army, nor pawn my clothes, nor refuse a handbill, nor enjoy a meal at a smart restaurant. That is a beginning.

== Fact and fiction ==
One of the debates surrounding Down and Out is whether it was a piece of factual autobiography or part fiction. Orwell wrote in the Introduction to the 1935 French edition: "I think I can say that I have exaggerated nothing except in so far as all writers exaggerate by selecting. I did not feel that I had to describe events in the exact order in which they happened, but everything I have described did take place at one time or another." In Chapter XXIV, it is "clear that Orwell did distort facts by claiming on his return from Paris he found himself down and out in London and had not 'the slightest notion of how to get a cheap bed'. This of course heightens the tension [...] but the truth is that in Paris he had already written his first substantial essay, "The Spike", describing a night spent in a Notting Hill tramps' hostel. Before his departure from England he had voluntarily lived among tramps for some time."

In The Road to Wigan Pier, Orwell referred to the tramping experiences described in Down and Out, writing that "nearly all the incidents described there actually happened, though they have been re-arranged." Some measure of the work's veracity may be gleaned from a marked-up copy, containing sixteen annotations, which Orwell gave to Brenda Salkeld. Of the descent into poverty from Chapter III, he wrote, "Succeeding chapters are not actually autobiography but drawn from what I have seen." Of Chapter VII, however, he wrote, "This all happened;" of Hotel X, "All as exact as I could make it;" and, of the Russian restaurant, "All the following is an entirely accurate description of the restaurant." On the personalities, Orwell's own introduction to the French edition states that the characters are individuals, but are "intended more as representative types."

The luxury hotel in which Orwell worked in the autumn of 1929 was identified as the Crillon by Sonia Orwell, as recounted by Sam White, the London Evening Standard's Paris correspondent in his column for 16 June 1967. The writers Stansky and Abrahams suggested, in their study of Orwell, that it was the Hotel Lotti.

== Reception ==
Within a month of publication, Humbert Possenti, "a restaurateur and hotelier of forty years," had written to The Times complaining that the book was unfairly disparaging to the restaurant trade. The Times Literary Supplement had previously reviewed Down and Out in Paris and London, describing it as "a vivid picture of an apparently mad world." Orwell responded to the restaurateur's criticism with a letter to the same newspaper: "I do know that in our hotel there were places which no customer could possibly have been allowed to see with any hope of retaining his custom." In France, political outlook very much determined the reception of La Vache enragée. The left welcomed it as an indictment of health hazards in commercial kitchens. The right accused Orwell of Francophobia. A middle of the road paper surmised that Orwell's account was likely to "give a retrospective retch to Americans" who had patronized Parisian restaurants.

In the Adelphi, C. Day Lewis wrote, "Orwell's book is a tour of the underworld, conducted without hysteria or prejudice [...] a model of clarity and good sense." JB Priestley, in the Evening Standard, considered it "uncommonly good reading. An excellent book and a valuable social document. The best book of its kind I have read in a long time." Compton Mackenzie wrote of Orwell's "immensely interesting book [...] a genuine human document, which at the same time is written with so much artistic force that, in spite of the squalor and degradation thus unfolded, the result is curiously beautiful with the beauty of an accomplished etching on copper. The account of a casual ward in this country horrifies like some scene of inexplicable misery in Dante."

Following the American publication, James T. Farrell, writing in The New Republic, called it "genuine, unexaggerated and intelligent," while Herbert Gorman wrote for The New York Times Book Review, "He possesses a keen eye for character and a rough-and-ready 'styleless style' that plunges along and makes the reader see what the author wants him to see." In contrast, the reviewer for The New English Weekly wrote, "This book [...] is forcefully written and is very readable, yet it fails to carry conviction. We wonder if the author was really down and out. Down certainly, but out?"

Cyril Connolly later wrote, "I don't think Down and Out in London and Paris is more than agreeable journalism; it was all better done by his friend Henry Miller. Orwell found his true form a few years later." Orwell agreed with this assessment. Miller's controversial novel Tropic of Cancer (1934) is based on his own experiences in Paris around the time Orwell was there.

In an essay for the 1971 The World of George Orwell, Richard Mayne considered the book as typical of something that was true of a great deal of Orwell's later writing: his "relish at revealing behind-the-scenes squalor. He was always taking the lid off things—poverty, parlour Socialism, life in a coal mine, prep-school tyranny, the Empire, the Spanish Civil War, the Russian Revolution, the political misuse of language. He might well have echoed W. H. Auden: All I have is a voice/To undo the folded lie."

The narrator's comments on Jews in the book—for example: "The shopman was a red-haired Jew, an extraordinarily disagreeable man … it would have been a pleasure to flatten the Jew's nose if only one could have afforded it"—are cited by a journalist for Haaretz when considering what he terms "Orwell’s latent anti-Semitism". Some suggest the work may have been Orwell's parody of his own social upbringing and social class, noticing the narrator has both racist and anti-racist outbursts. Another commentator cites the book as evidence that anti-Semitism was much more prevalent in Paris than in London.

== See also ==
- Bibliography of George Orwell
