= The Road to Wigan Pier =

1937 book by George Orwell

- Left Book Club supplementary volume, with 32 pages of plates, left, and first Left Book Club edition, right
- Author: George Orwell
- Language: English
- Genre: Autobiography
- Publisher: Victor Gollancz (London)
- Publication date: 8 March 1937 as a Left Book Club selection and a cloth-bound trade edition (Left Book Club supplementary volume, Part I, with 32 pages of plates, published May 1937)
- Publication place: United Kingdom
- Media type: Print (hardback)
- ISBN: 978-0-141-18529-3
- Preceded by: Keep the Aspidistra Flying
- Followed by: Homage to Catalonia

The Road to Wigan Pier is the fifth book by the English writer George Orwell, first published in 1937. Its first half documents his sociological investigations of the bleak living conditions among the working class in Lancashire and Yorkshire in the industrial areas of Northern England before World War II. Its second half is a long essay on his middle-class upbringing, and the development of his political conscience, questioning British attitudes towards socialism. Orwell states plainly that he himself is in favour of socialism, but feels it necessary to point out reasons why many people who would benefit from socialism, and should logically support it, are in practice likely to be strong opponents.

According to Orwell biographer Bernard Crick, publisher Victor Gollancz first tried to persuade Orwell's agent to allow the Left Book Club edition to consist solely of the descriptive first half of the book. When this was refused Gollancz wrote an introduction to the book. "Victor could not bear to reject it, even though his suggestion that the 'repugnant' second half should be omitted from the Club edition was turned down. On this occasion Victor, albeit nervously, did overrule Communist Party objections in favour of his publishing instinct. His compromise was to publish the book with [an introduction] full of good criticism, unfair criticism, and half-truths."

The book grapples "with the social and historical reality of Depression suffering in the north of England, – Orwell does not wish merely to enumerate evils and injustices, but to break through what he regards as middle-class oblivion, – Orwell's corrective to such falsity comes first by immersion of his own body – a supreme measure of truth for Orwell – directly into the experience of misery."

== Background ==
Orwell submitted the typescript of Keep the Aspidistra Flying to Gollancz on 15 January 1936. At some point in the next few days Gollancz asked him to consider a new project – writing a book about unemployment and social conditions in economically depressed northern England. In the period from 31 January to 30 March 1936, Orwell lived in Wigan, Barnsley and Sheffield researching the book.

Gollancz was not only a successful publisher but also a dedicated social reformer. "As a social reformer, a socialist, and an idealist, Gollancz had an unquestioning, perhaps overly optimistic, faith in education; if only people could be made to know the nature of poverty, he thought, they would want to eradicate it, remove from power the government that tolerated it, and transform the economic system that brought it into being." As a successful publisher however, he knew that to reach a large audience he needed something more than a collection of facts, statistics, graphs and dogmatic conclusions.

The view that this was a specific commission with a £500 advance – two years' income for Orwell at the time – is based on a recollection by Geoffrey Gorer who was interviewed for Melvyn Bragg's TV programme Omnibus in 1970. He reported that Gollancz had offered Orwell £500 to underwrite the trip, and but for Gollancz's support Orwell would never have gone. Recent biographers, however, do not repeat this account. On 1 April 1936, Orwell rented a cottage in the remote village of Wallington, Hertfordshire, where he wrote The Road to Wigan Pier. Biographer Michael Shelden points out that the rental for the cottage was less than £2 a month.

Orwell, as well as living off the land, supplemented his income by running the cottage as the village store. Yet, writing to Jack Common in April 1936 about setting up shop, "Orwell sounds hard put to find £20 in order to stock his shelves, rather than a man who had received £500 a couple of months earlier." When it came to marrying, Orwell wrote to Gorer: "I should never be economically justified in marrying, so might as well be unjustified now as later". D. J. Taylor argues that these factors, and the fact that Gollancz was not a person to part with such a sum on speculation, suggest that Gorer was confusing Orwell's eventual earnings from the book with a small contribution for out-of-pocket expenses that Gollancz might have given him.

Orwell set out on the journey on the last day of January 1936, having given up his job at "Booklovers' Corner" and his flat in Kentish Town; he would not live in London again until 1940. He made no plans, but Richard Rees promised to send him names of people in the north connected with The Adelphi or the Adelphi Summer School who might help him – Orwell also established a network of contacts through the National Unemployed Workers' Movement. One of these NUWM contacts was Jack Hilton, a working-class author from Rochdale. Orwell wrote to Hilton seeking lodging and asking for advice on his route. Hilton was unable to provide him lodging, but suggested that he travel to Wigan rather than Rochdale, "for there are the colliers and they’re good stuff." For the next two months Orwell followed a route from Birmingham to Manchester to Leeds. He kept a diary from 31 January to 25 March, which records the unretouched material that he would develop into the first part of The Road to Wigan Pier.

For three weeks in February 1936 he was in Wigan, the longest single stop he would make; March was allotted to Yorkshire – Sheffield, Leeds, Barnsley. He had completed a rough first draft of the book by October and sent off the final version to Moore in December. Gollancz published the work under the Left Book Club, which gave Orwell a far higher circulation than his previous works. However, Gollancz feared the second half would offend Left Book Club readers and inserted a mollifying preface to the book while Orwell was in Spain. The original edition included 32 illustrations that were photographs of Welsh coal miners and of slums in the East End of London. Orwell did not choose the images and their inclusion may not have been his idea.

== Structure ==
The book is divided into two sections.

Part One

George Orwell set out to report on working-class life in the bleak industrial heartlands of the West Midlands, Yorkshire and Lancashire. He spent his time living among the people and as such his descriptions are detailed and vivid.

- Chapter One describes the life of the Brooker family, a more wealthy example of the northern working class. They have a shop and cheap lodging house in their home. Orwell describes the old people who live in the home and their living conditions.
- Chapter Two describes the life of miners and conditions down a coal mine. Orwell describes how he went down a coal mine to observe proceedings and he explains how the coal is distributed. The working conditions are very poor. This is the part of the book most often quoted.
- Chapter Three describes the social situation of the average miner. Hygienic and financial conditions are discussed. Orwell explains why most miners do not actually earn as much as they are sometimes believed to.
- Chapter Four describes the housing situation in the industrial north. There is a housing shortage in the region and therefore people are more likely to accept substandard housing. The housing conditions are very poor.
- Chapter Five explores unemployment and Orwell explains that the unemployment statistics of the time are misleading.
- Chapter Six deals with the food of the average miner and how, although they generally have enough money to buy food, most families prefer to buy something tasty to enrich their dull lives. This leads to malnutrition and physical degeneration in many families.
- Chapter Seven describes the ugliness of the industrial towns in the north of England.

Part Two

In contrast to the straightforward documentary of the first part of the book, in part two Orwell discusses the relevance of socialism to improving living conditions. This section proved controversial.

Orwell sets out his initial premises very simply:

1. Are the appalling conditions described in part one tolerable? (No)
2. Is socialism "wholeheartedly applied as a world system" capable of improving those conditions? (Yes)
3. Why then are we not all socialists?

The rest of the book consists of Orwell's attempt to answer this difficult question. He points out that most people who argue against socialism do not do so because of straightforward selfish motives, or because they do not believe that the system would work, but for more complex emotional reasons, which (according to Orwell) most socialists misunderstand. He identifies five main problems:

1. Class prejudice. This is real and it is visceral. Middle-class socialists do themselves no favours by pretending it does not exist and – by glorifying the manual worker – they tend to alienate the large section of the population that is economically working-class but culturally middle-class.
2. Machine worship. Orwell finds most socialists guilty of this. Orwell himself is suspicious of technological progress for its own sake and thinks it inevitably leads to softness and decadence. He points out that most fictional technically advanced socialist utopias are deadly dull. H. G. Wells in particular is criticised on these grounds.
3. Crankiness. Among many other types of people Orwell specifies people who have beards or wear sandals, vegetarians, and nudists as contributing to socialism's negative reputation among many more conventional people.
4. Turgid language. Those who pepper their sentences with "notwithstandings" and "heretofores" and become over excited when discussing dialectical materialism are unlikely to gain much popular support.
5. Failure to concentrate on the basics. Socialism should be about common decency and fair shares for all rather than political orthodoxy or philosophical consistency.

In presenting these arguments Orwell takes on the role of devil's advocate. He states very plainly that he himself is in favour of socialism but feels it necessary to point out reasons why many people, who would benefit from socialism, and should logically support it, are in practice likely to be strong opponents.

Orwell's publisher, Victor Gollancz, was so concerned that these passages would be misinterpreted, and that the (mostly middle-class) members of the Left Book Club would be offended, that he added a foreword in which he raises some caveats about Orwell's claims in Part Two. He suggests, for instance, that Orwell may exaggerate the visceral contempt that the English middle classes hold for the working class, adding, however, that, "I may be a bad judge of the question, for I am a Jew, and passed the years of my early boyhood in a fairly close Jewish community; and, among Jews of this type, class distinctions do not exist."

Other concerns Gollancz raises are that Orwell should so instinctively dismiss movements such as pacifism or feminism as incompatible with or counter-productive to the Socialist cause, and that Orwell relies too much upon a poorly defined, emotional concept of Socialism. Gollancz claims that Orwell "does not once define what he means by Socialism" in The Road to Wigan Pier. The foreword does not appear in some modern editions of the book, though it was included, for instance, in Harcourt Brace Jovanovich's first American edition in the 1950s.

At a later date Gollancz published part one on its own, against Orwell's wishes, and he refused to publish Homage to Catalonia at all.

== Book title ==
Orwell was asked about Wigan Pier in a radio programme in December 1943. He replied: "Well, I am afraid I must tell you that Wigan Pier doesn't exist. I made a journey specially to see it in 1936 and I couldn't find it. It did exist once, however, and to judge from the photographs it must have been about twenty feet [six metres] long." The original "pier" at Wigan was a coal loading staithe, probably a wooden jetty, where wagons of coal from a nearby colliery were unloaded into waiting barges on the canal. The original wooden pier is believed to have been demolished in 1929, with the iron from the tippler being sold as scrap.

Although a pier is a structure built out into the water from the shore, in Britain the term has the connotation of a seaside holiday. In the broadcast radio interview of 1943 Orwell elaborated on the name Wigan Pier: "Wigan is in the middle of the mining areas. The landscape is mostly slag-heaps – Wigan has always been picked on as a symbol of the ugliness of the industrial areas. At one time, on one of the muddy little canals that run round the town, there used to be a tumble-down wooden jetty; and by way of a joke some nicknamed this Wigan Pier. The joke caught on locally, and then the music-hall comedians got hold of it, and they are the ones who have succeeded in keeping Wigan Pier alive as a byword."

Geographically, Wigan Pier is the name given today to the area around the canal at the bottom of the Wigan flight of locks on the Leeds and Liverpool Canal.

== Reviews and criticism ==
The book was reviewed on 14 March 1937 by Edward Shanks, for The Sunday Times, and by Hugh Massingham, for The Observer.

=== Initial response ===
In general, early reviewers of The Road to Wigan Pier praised Orwell's depiction of the working class in Part I. The poet Edith Sitwell wrote: "The horror of the beginning ... is unsurpassable. He seems to be doing for the modern world what Engels did for the world of 1840–50. But with this difference, that Orwell is a born writer, whereas Engels, fiery and splendid spirit though he was, simply wasn't a writer." Responses to Part II, as the book transformed from reportage into a mix of politics, polemics, and selective autobiography, were more varied, ranging from praise to anger and indignation. Arthur Calder-Marshall's 20 March 1937 review in Time and Tide celebrates Orwell's achievement, and can be summarised by its first line: "Of Mr Orwell's book, there is little to say except praise."

This sentiment is shared in a review by Hamish Miles in New Statesman and Nation on 1 May 1937. Miles writes that The Road to Wigan Pier "is a living and lively book from start to finish. The honest Tory must face what he tells and implies, and the honest Socialist must face him, too." Douglas Goldring, writing in Fortnightly in April 1937, describes the book as "beautiful" and "disturbing", and like Miles highly recommends that both conservatives and socialists read it. In Tribune on 12 March 1937, Walter Greenwood calls Part I "authentic and first rate" but was more ambivalent towards Part II: "[In Part II, Orwell] has you with him one moment and provoked beyond endurance the next ... I cannot remember having been so infuriated for a long time than by some of the things he says here."

H. J. Laski, a co-founder of the Left Book Club, wrote a review in March 1937 in Left News which repeats the main arguments of Gollancz's preface. Laski claims that Part I is "admirable propaganda for our ideas" but that Part II falls short: "But having, very ably, depicted a disease, Mr Orwell does what so many well-meaning people do: needing a remedy (he knows it is socialism), he offers an incantation instead. He thinks that an appeal to 'liberty' and 'justice' will, on the basis of facts such as he has described, bring people tumbling over one another into the Socialist Party. ... This view is based on fallacies so elementary that I should doubt the necessity of explaining them as fallacies were it not that there are so many people who share Mr Orwell's view. Its basic error is the belief that we all mean the same things by liberty and justice. Most emphatically we do not."

In the April 1937 edition of the Left News, Gollancz reported that the book had produced "both more, and more interesting, letters than any other Club Choice. The book has done, perhaps in a greater degree than any previous book, what the Club is meant to do – it has provoked thought, and discussion of the keenest kind. While members with a training in scientific socialism have been surprised at the naïveté of the second part, they have found it valuable, as showing how much education they still have to do." Orwell biographers Stansky and Abrahams noted: "But Gollancz and Laski, believing in a scientific rather than an emotional socialism, believing (in 1937) that it was still possible to equip people to fight against war and Fascism, were caught in a time warp: history was leaving them behind. Orwell in Spain was continuing his education – in a real war against Fascism – and it was very different from anything envisioned by the selectors of the Left Book Club. What he was learning had less to do with scientific socialism than with the morality of politics, and it would change his life."

A radio play by David Pownall, Writing on Wigan Pier, with Adrian Scarborough as Orwell, was broadcast by BBC Radio Four in 2010.

=== Criticism ===
Communist Party of Great Britain leader Harry Pollitt, who was also an acquaintance of Orwell and a native of Lancashire where the book is set, gave a strongly negative review. Although Pollitt praised Orwell's description of mining conditions and the indictment of housing in industrial centres, he believed that Road to Wigan Pier was a snobbish portrayal of working class life.

If ever snobbery had its hallmark placed upon it, it is by Mr Orwell. If on his return from Mandalay he had bought one or two penny pamphlets on socialism and the working-class movement, what fatal experiences he could have saved himself from, Because one never gets to know the movement by slumming.

I gather that the chief thing that worries Mr Orwell is the "smell" of the working-class, for smells seem to occupy the major portion of the book. Well, pardon me if I say at once, without any working-class snobbery, that it's a lie.

Pollitt also attacked Orwell for judging people on their aesthetic, rather than whether they wanted to build a better world.

I am not concerned whether a man wants to drink a lemonade with a straw and in shorts or whether coming out of the docks he calls for a pint of Mann and Crossman's: the thing I am concerned about is: are they concerned to try and build up a new society? If so, what is the best way in which we can help them? And we don't do this by telling them they "smell", or that they are "showing fat bottoms in shorts". It can only be done by patient argument, by careful explanation, and by really trying to understand their particular problems, and show by our understanding that we want to help.

According to Christopher Hitchens, the allegation of having said "the working classes smell" in The Road to Wigan Pier became a recurring criticism of Orwell from critics on the Left, despite it not being his personal sentiment. "As his published correspondence shows, every time Orwell wrote anything objectionable to the Left, up would come this old charge again, having attained the mythic status that placed it beyond mere factual refutation." In the book, according to Hitchens, Orwell instead refers to it being "middle-class people, such as his own immediate forebears, [that] were convinced that 'the working classes smell'."

== See also ==
- Coal miners
- Wigan Pier
