= Mark Plowman =

Mark Plowman may refer to:

- Max Plowman, also known as Mark VII
- Mark Plowman (The Messengers), fictional character
