= Langham, Essex =

Village in Essex, England

Coordinates: 51.945006°N 0.950489°E

Langham
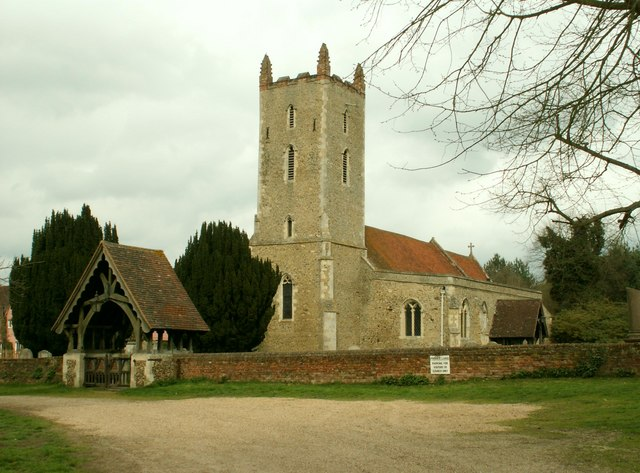
- St Mary's church, Langham

- Location within Essex
- Population: 1,032 (Parish, 2021)
- OS grid reference: TM025315
- Civil parish: Langham
- District: City of Colchester
- Shire county: Essex
- Region: East
- Country: England
- Sovereign state: United Kingdom
- Post town: Colchester
- Postcode district: CO4
- Dialling code: 01206
- Police: Essex
- Fire: Essex
- Ambulance: East of England
- UK Parliament: Harwich and North Essex

Langham is a village and civil parish in the City of Colchester district of Essex, England. At the 2021 census the parish had a population of 1,032.

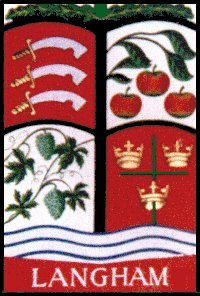
Langham village sign featuring pictures of apples, a crop historically grown in the village.

== History ==
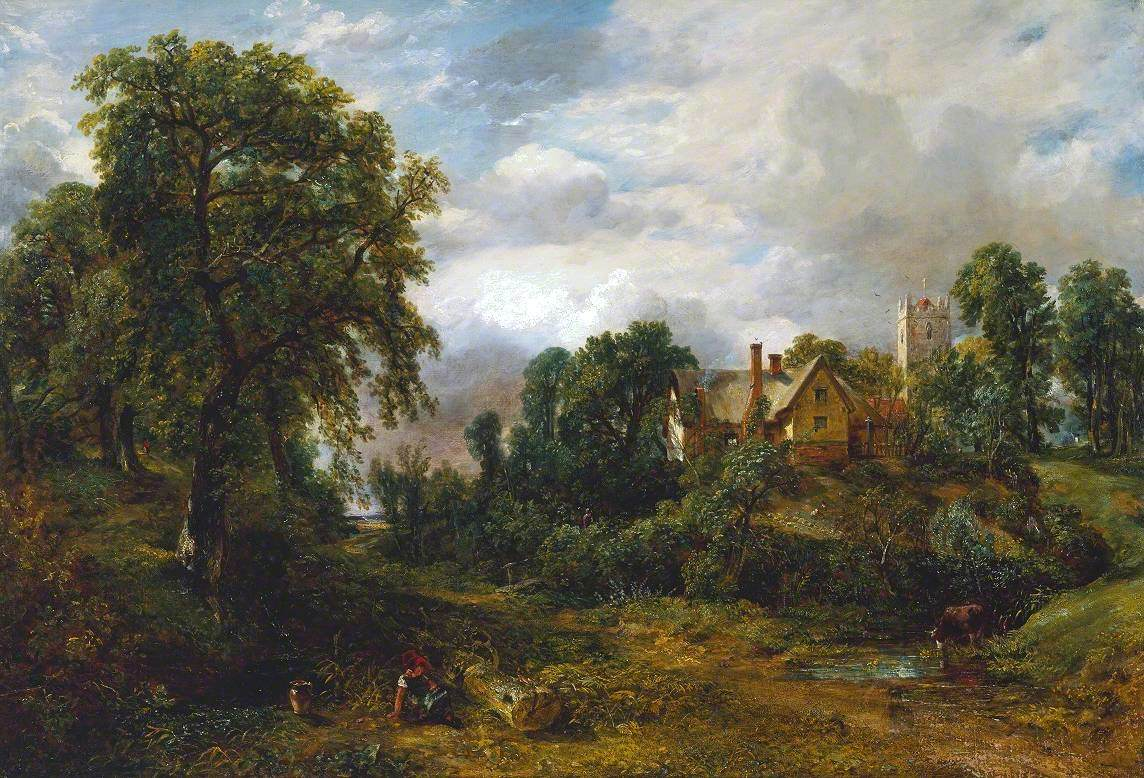
The Glebe Farm by John Constable, 1830

There is little evidence of pre-Roman occupation of what is now Langham, but the Romans built a villa at the north end of the village close to the River Stour and the Roman Road from Colchester into Suffolk also ran to the east of the village, and so there was probably Roman activity in the area of the village.

The Anglo-Saxons later established a settlement which was possibly called Laingaham, the spelling in the Domesday Book of 1086. The Domesday Book shows a small agricultural community with the manor held by Walter Tirel, the man who was accused of shooting King William Rufus while hunting for deer in the New Forest.

Langham, like most of the villages along the Stour Valley, was primarily agricultural until the 20th century, with a few large farms and many small holdings. Like the other villages it enjoyed a period of prosperity due to the cloth trade, which started at the end of the 14th century and lasted until the 17th century. The church of St Mary the Virgin dates from the 12th century. In 1830 John Constable painted a landscape The Glebe Farm which featured the church.

Up to the start of the 20th century Langham would have been a reasonably self-contained community and everyday items could have been bought at the village stores or from the variety of shops in Dedham. However, the Essex Great Road from London to Norwich via Colchester, later known as the A12, ran up its east side and after the growth of the coaching routes in the 18th century it would have been possible to go to Colchester, Ipswich or even London.

During World War II a large airbase (called RAF Boxted) was built on land to the south of the main village area. Although much of the airfield has since reverted to agriculture some features and memorials remain.

Since 2004 a small community shop, housed in the community centre, and staffed by volunteers, has acted as a community hub selling local produce and hosting a mobile post office.

== Schools ==
There are two schools in Langham.

Langham Primary School has roughly 90-100 pupils.

Langham Oaks School The school's enrollment is 80 male pupils, the majority of whom come from Essex and the school is an Academy delivering SEMH (Social, Emotional and Mental Health) provision.

The school moved into a new purpose build school on the site in 2021

The School delivers a comprehensive curriculum which follows an Academic and Vocation model (Including residential provision) to meet both the social and academic needs of the students.

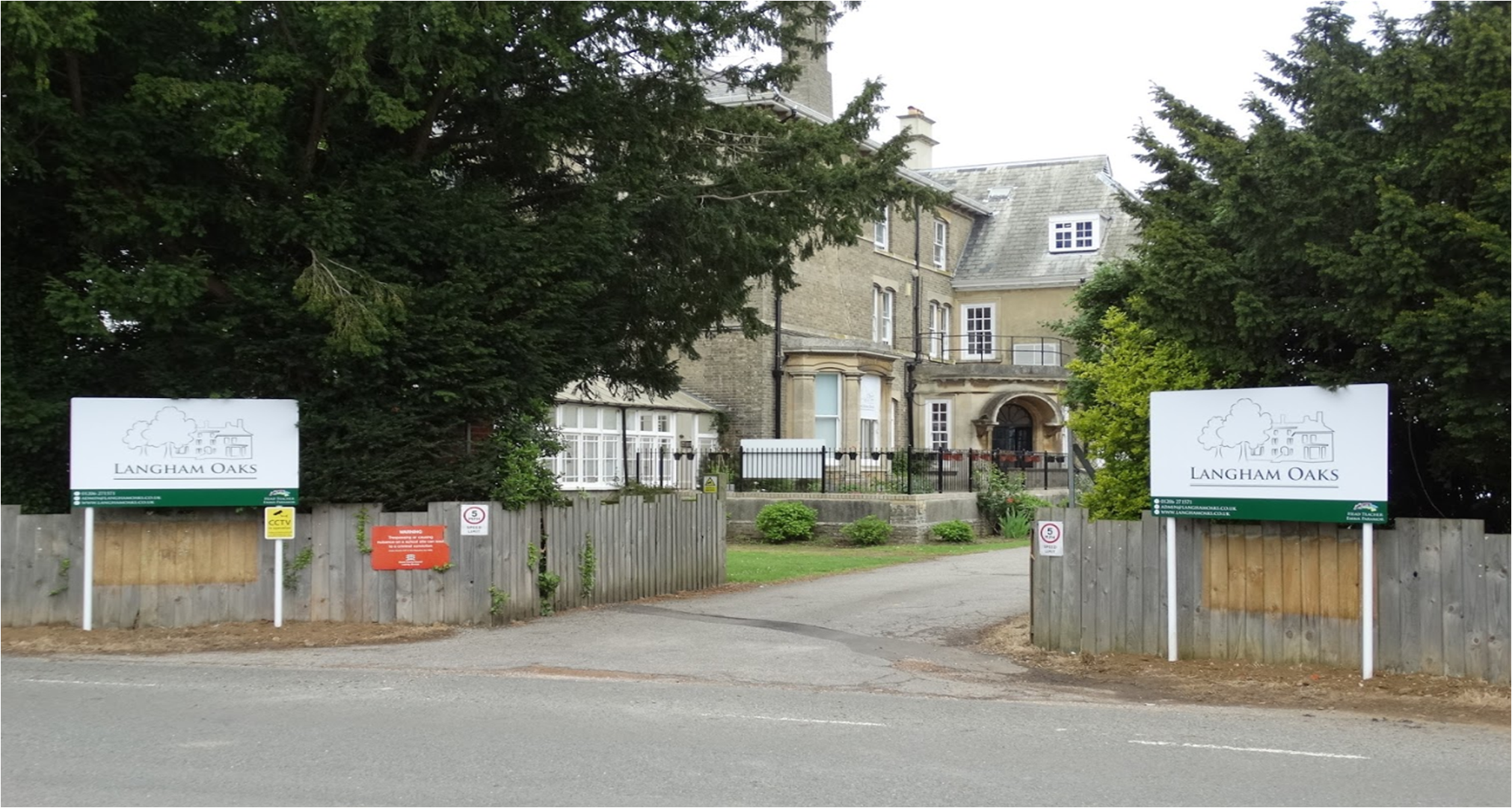
Langham Oaks School. Photograph showing the school following on from the Academy process in April 2015.

In October 2024 the school was rated as Good in all 4 judgment areas by Ofsted. The School forms part of the SEAX trust

In December 2024 the schools residential provision was rated Good by Ofsted in all judgement areas

== Notable people ==
Sir Robert Balfour, 1st Baronet An MP & businessman, he lived at the Hall. His son's name is on the village war memorial.

Charles Darling, 1st Baron Darling An MP and judge who lived at the Hall. He was made Baron Darling of Langham in the County of Essex in 1924.

George Dummer was a farm worker who lived at Munsons, Moor Road. Dummer bred the Discovery (apple).

John Middleton Murry Literary critic, writer, socialist, pacifist who co-founded The Adelphi where George Orwell gave a summer school lecture in 1936.

Mary Edith Pechey Pioneer women's doctor who lived at the Manse/Highfields, Dedham Road.

Max Plowman Journalist, poet, authority on William Blake, and leading pacifist who lived at Little Oaks. He co-founded The Adelphi and is buried in the village churchyard.

Frederic Raphael Screenwriter who lived at the Wick.
