= Richard Price (poet) =

British poet, novelist, and translator (born 1966)

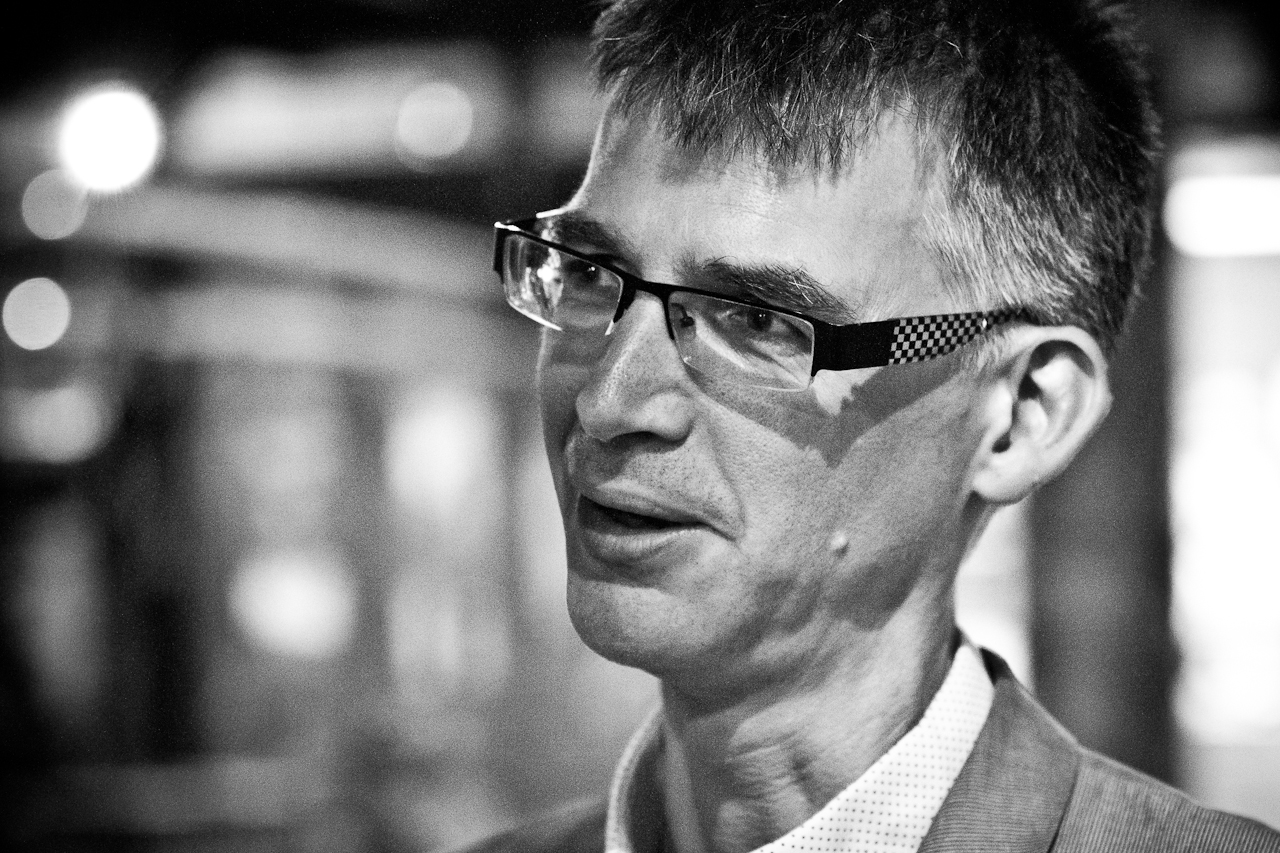

Richard John Price (born 1966 in Reading, England) is a British poet, novelist, and translator. From 1988 to 2024 he was a librarian at the British Library, London.

== Life ==
He grew up in Renfrewshire where he went to Kilmacolm Primary School, Houston Primary School, and Gryffe High School. He studied at Napier College, in journalism, and graduated the University of Strathclyde in English and Librarianship, with a joint first. He earned a PhD at University of Strathclyde.

== Career ==
He has worked with artists in sculpture, digital art, artist's books and music. His collaborators include David Annand, Julie Johnstone, Simon Lewandowski, Karen Bleitz, Caroline Trettine and Ronald King. He was a lyricist and vocalist in the musical projects Mirabeau and, later, The Loss Adjustors.

His translations include the Guillaume Apollinaire poems in Eftirs / Afters (with translations of other French modernists by Donny O'Rourke, Au Quai, 1996) and the Louise Labé poems in Lute Variations (Rack Press, 2005), the latter collected in Rays (Carcanet, 2009).

In the 1990s he co-edited the poetry magazines Gairfish (with W. N. Herbert), Verse (with Robert Crawford, Henry Hart, David Kinloch, and others) and Southfields (with Raymond Friel). At this time he also ran the poetry publisher Vennel Press with Leona Medlin, publishing books by W.N. Herbert, Elizabeth James, David Kinloch, Peter McCarey, Medlin and Price themselves, and others. He was one of the group associated with Informationist poetry, coining the phrase. He introduced Informationist ideas in 1991 in the magazine Interference and, later, in his introduction to the anthology of Informationist poetry Contraflow on the Superhighway, co-edited with Herbert (Gairfish and Southfields, 1994). In 1994 he successfully completed his PhD at the University of Strathclyde, Glasgow, on the novelist of the inter-war years Neil M. Gunn and his engagement with the tragic. Price's introduction to Gunn's work, The Fabulous Matter of Fact, had been published in 1991 by Edinburgh University Press. He currently edits the magazine Painted, spoken.

From 2003 to 2010 he was Head of Modern British Collections at the British Library, London, leading the curatorial team responsible for the UK printed books and periodicals collection from 1914 onwards as well as UK web archiving. He also curated exhibitions that included Ted Hughes: The Page is Printed (2004) and The Possibility of Poetry: From Migrant magazine to artists' books (2007). He has written on the history of the modern literary magazine in the United Kingdom, co-authoring with David Miller British Poetry Magazines 1914-2000: A History and Bibliography of 'Little Magazines' (British Library, 2006). From 2010 to 2014 he was the Head of Content and Research Strategy at the Library, before becoming the first Head of Contemporary British Collections there, a department devoted to print, digital, manuscripts and sound.

Lucky Day which reflects on the disability of his daughter, who has Angelman syndrome, was shortlisted for the Forward First Collection Prize, the Jerwood Aldburgh Prize and the Whitbread prize. Rays (Carcanet), containing many love poems as well as variations on the sonnets and canzone of Louise Labé and Guido Cavalcanti was shortlisted for a Scottish Book Award.

In 2010 he published The Island (Two Ravens Press) a novel about a father and young daughter who, as an act of revenge, steal a car. It draws on characters who first appeared in his short story collection A Boy in Summer (Neil Wilson / 11:9, 2002).

In 2011 the musical project for which he was the principal lyricist, Mirabeau, released its first album, Golden Key. Several of the songs are settings of poems from his earlier poetry collections while others are closer to rock and folk genres of songwriting. Mirabeau comprised Price (as lyricist and vocalist) and the singer-songwriter Caroline Trettine with contributions by various musicians including Ian Kearey (of The Blue Aeroplanes).

In 2012 his poem "Hedge Sparrows" was chosen to represent Great Britain in the Olympics project the Written World, and recorded for BBC radio by the actor Jim Broadbent.

In the same year his collection Small World (Carcanet) was published, a collection of poems about fatherhood and daughters and their changing relationship, and, in a final sequence, a catastrophe which brings all the lives in the book into perspective. Small World won Price's first major award, winning in the poetry category of the Scottish Mortgage Investment Trust Book Awards. A poem from the collection, 'An old drawer up beyond the children', was produced as an animation by Michael Hughes.

In 2013 Price was Poet in Residence at the University of Coimbra, in association with Idanha-a-Nova, Portugal.

In 2013 and 2014 he toured with Iain Bamforth, David Kinloch, Peter McCarey as "The Last Men on Mercury", appearing in Manchester, London, Geneva, Stasbourg and Glasgow and featuring guest poets including Lucy Burnett, Dorothy Lehane, Hannah Lowe, and Peter Manson. In 2014 the Slovak filmmaker Viera Čákanyová made a short film about his work, filming while he was on tour in Slovakia, the Czech Republic and Poland.

In 2015 the second (and final) Mirabeau album was released, Age of Exploration. Price would later form The Loss Adjustors with Roberto Sainz de la Maza, who appeared as a guitarist on many Mirabeau tracks, and with singer Elisa de Leon.

In 2016 he published Is This A Poem? (Molecular Press), selected essays on lyric poetry, little magazines, and artist's books.

In 2017 his collection Moon for Sale (Carcanet) was published and subsequently shortlisted for the Saltire Society's Poetry Book of the Year. That year his collaboration with the artist Ronald King, Sedna and the Fulmar was also published, by Circle Press. Its focus on an episode in the Inuit spiritual world would be amplified later in his next Carcanet collection The Owner of the Sea: Three Inuit Sequences Retold (Carcanet, 2021).

In 2017 he convened meetings with artists Egidija Čiricaitė and Sophie Loss, and British Library curator Jeremy Jenkins, which led to the Artists Books Now series of live events at the Library, 2018-2019, where book artists presented their books in front of an audience and discussed their work.

In 2018 he collaborated with the artist Julie Johnstone to produce the satirical work, Digital (essence press). At this time he began to work with Roberto Sainz de la Maza who composed the music, produced and played on the resulting album by The Loss Adjustors, The World Brims (2020). It features Price on vocals with the singer Elisa de Leon. All of the lyrics are written by Price, with many of the tracks based on poems in Moon for Sale as well as on newer, uncollected work.

In 2021 The Owner of the Sea was published, becoming a Scotsman Newspaper Book of the Year. In 2022 he collaborated with the artist Simon Lewandowski on a book of poems and images examining the life of dating apps, Tinderness (Wild Pansy Press). This was followed by Late Gifts (Carcanet, 2023) a collection centred on the relationship between a father and a son.

In 2024, after 36 years at the British Library, he took early retirement to concentrate on his writing career.

== Awards and Shortlistings ==
- 1987 Winner, Keith Wright Memorial Prize for Poetry, University of Strathclyde, Glasgow
- 1988 Winner, Keith Wright Memorial Prize for Poetry, University of Strathclyde, Glasgow
- 1988 Winner, STV Creative Writing Prize, Universities of Glasgow and Strathclyde
- 1997 Paul Hamlyn Poetry Award, Runner Up for pamphlet Hand Held
- 2005 Forward Felix Dennis First Collection Prize (shortlist) for Lucky Day
- 2005 Whitbread Poetry Book of the Year (shortlist) for Lucky Day
- 2005 Jerwood/Aldeburgh First Collection Prize (shortlist) for Lucky Day
- 2008 Scottish Arts Council Poetry Book of the Year Award (shortlist) for Greenfields
- 2010 Scottish Arts Council Poetry Book of the Year Award (shortlist) for Rays
- 2013 Winner, Creative Scotland SMIT Poetry Book of the Year for Small World
- 2017 Saltire Society Poetry Book of the Year (shortlist) for Moon for Sale

== Works ==
=== Poetry ===
- Tube Shelter Perspective (Southfields, 1993)
- Sense and a Minor Fever (Vennel, 1993)
- Marks & Sparks (Akros, 1995)
- Hand Held (Akros, 1997)
- Perfume & Petrol Fumes (Diehard, 1999)
- Frosted, Melted (Diehard, 2002)
- Lucky Day (Carcanet, 2005, ISBN 978-1-85754-761-0)
- Greenfields (Carcanet, 2007, ISBN 978-1-85754-920-1)
- Rays (Carcanet, 2009, ISBN 978-1-84777-010-3)
- Small World (Carcanet, 2012, ISBN 978-1847771582)
- Moon for Sale (Carcanet, 2017)
- The Owner of the Sea: Three Inuit Stories Retold (Carcanet, 2021)
- Late Gifts (Carcanet, 2023)

=== Film ===
*Richard Price, directed by Viera Čákanyová, (Česká televize, 2015)

=== Artist's Books ===
- Gift Horse, images and design by Ronald King, poem by Richard Price, Circle Press, 1999
- A Twenty-Piece Puzzle, edition of three, visual art and design by Chan Ky-Yut, poems by Richard Price, Lyric Press, 2004.
- The Mechanical Word, five mechanical books by Karen Bleitz with poems by Richard Price, Circle Press, 2005.
- little but often, design by Ronald King, with poems by Richard Price, Circle Press, 2007
- folded, design by Julie Johnstone, text by Richard Price, essence press, 2008
- Wake Up and Sleep, images and design by Caroline Isgar, poems by Richard Price, 2009
- Going, going, gone, images and design by Ronald King, poems by Richard Price, Circle Press, 2013
- Sedna and the Fulmar, images and design by Ronald King, poems by Richard Price, 2017
- Digital, design by Julie Johnstone, text by Richard Price, essence press, 2018
- Tinderness, design and photographs by Simon Lewandowski, poems by Richard Price, Wild Pansy Press, 2022

=== Short stories ===
- A boy in summer: short stories, 11/9, 2002, ISBN 978-1-903238-50-9

=== Novels ===
- The Island, Two Ravens Press, ISBN 978-1-906120-54-2

=== Non-fiction ===
- The Fabulous Matter of Fact: The Poetics of Neil M. Gunn Edinburgh University Press, 1991. ISBN 978-0-7486-0259-9
- David Miller, Richard Price (eds), British Poetry Magazines 1914-2000: A History and Bibliography (Oak Knoll Press/The British Library, 2006). ISBN 978-1-58456-197-2
- David Kinloch, Richard Price (eds), La Nouvelle Alliance: influences francophone sur la littérature écossaise moderne (Ellug, 2000)
- James McGonigal, Richard Price (eds) The Star You Steer By: Basil Bunting and British Modernism (Rodopi, 2000)
- Richard Price, Is This A Poem? [Essays on Modern Poetry, Poetry Magazines, and Artist's Books] (Molecular, 2016).

== Reviews ==
- Robert Potts (18 June 2005). "Margin of horror (Review of Lucky Day)". The Guardian.
- David Wheatley (31 October 2009). "Rays by Richard Price and The Hundred Thousand Places by Thomas A Clark". The Guardian.
- Caroline Clark (23 Jan 2013). "Clark on Price (Review of Small World)". Eyewear.
