= Richard Murry =

British painter (1902–1984)

- Born: Richard Arthur Crossthwaite Murry; 8 May 1902; Dulwich, England
- Died: December 1984 (aged 82); Fulham, England
- Education: Slade School of Fine Art; Central School of Arts and Crafts
- Occupation: Painter

Richard Arthur Crosswaite Murry (8 May 1902 – December 1984) was a British painter.

== Life and career ==
Murry was born in London and, encouraged by his brother John Middleton Murry, studied book production at the Central School of Arts and Crafts before enrolling at the Slade School of Fine Art where, in 1925, he was awarded a Robert Rose scholarship. Murry went on to serve as secretary of the New English Art Club for three years before teaching at the Architectural Association and then at Surbition Grammar School, from 1930 to 1938. During World War II Murry served in the Royal Marines and with the Royal Naval Film Unit while continuing to paint. The War Artists' Advisory Committee purchased one of these paintings and it is now held by the Imperial War Museum in London. Shortly before the war, Murry had taken the post of librarian at the Central School and he returned to this position after his military service. His work was part of the painting event at the art competition at the 1948 Summer Olympics. Murry retired from the Central School in 1967, having also acted as secretary to the Art Workers' Guild. Throughout his career Murry exhibited with the London Group, the Royal Society of British Artists and the Royal Institute of Oil Painters. He also exhibited at both the Leger and Goupil Galleries and Sally Hunter Fine Art hosted a memorial exhibition.
