= W. N. Herbert =

Scottish poet

Bill Herbert
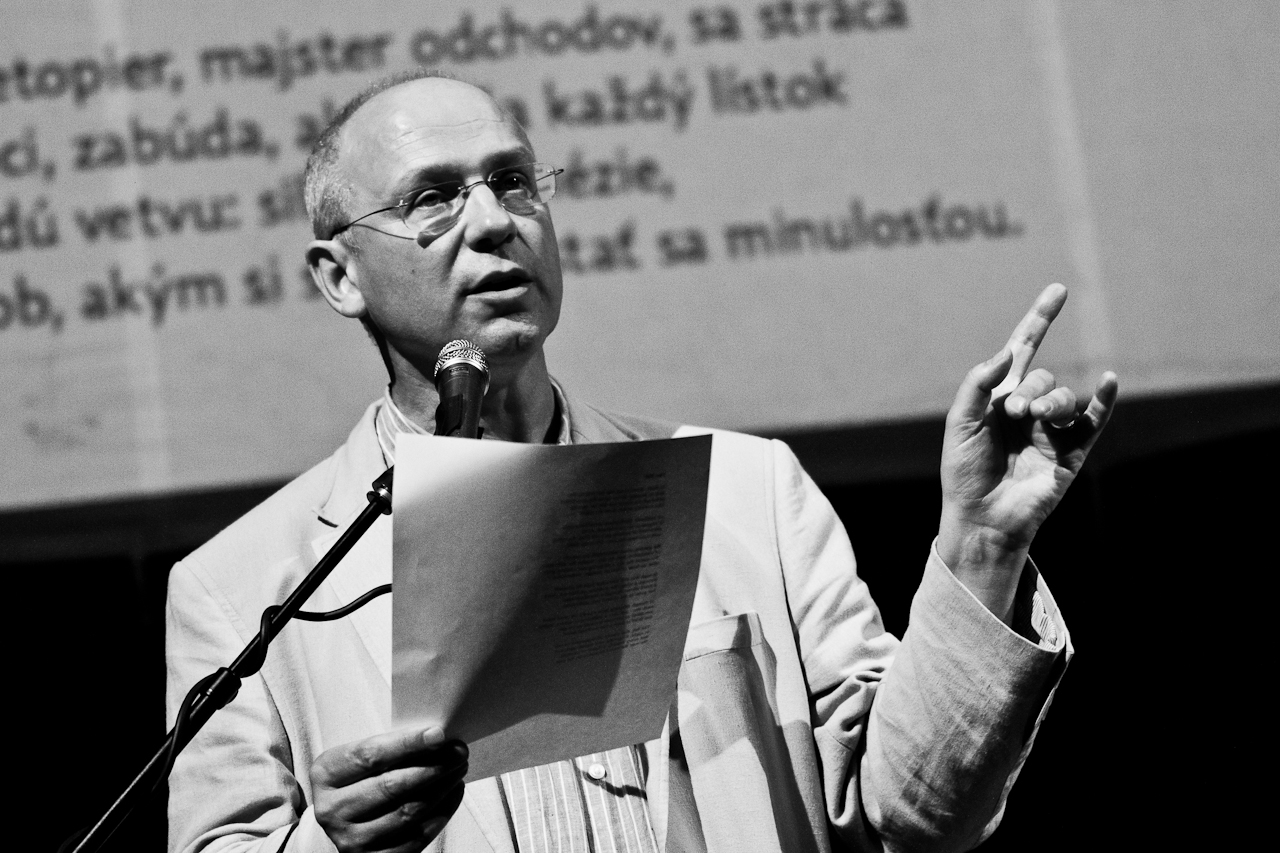
- Born: 1961 (age 64–65); Dundee, Scotland
- Education: Brasenose College, Oxford
- Occupations: poet, academic
- Writing career
- Pen name: W. N. Herbert
- Language: English and Scots
- Website: wnherbert.wordpress.com

W. N. Herbert FRSL, also known as Bill Herbert (born 1961) is a poet from Dundee, Scotland. He writes in both English and Scots. He and Richard Price founded the poetry magazine Gairfish. He currently teaches at Newcastle University.

== Early life ==
Herbert was born in 1961 in Dundee. He was educated at Grove Academy and then studied at Brasenose College, Oxford gaining a Doctor of Philosophy in 1992 after completing a thesis on the work of Hugh MacDiarmid.

== Career ==
In 1994, he was one of 20 poets chosen by a panel of judges, as the New Generation in a promotion organised by the Poetry Society. He was one of the writers involved in the Informationist poetry movement that emerged in Scotland in the 1990s.

He became a professor of Poetry & Creative Writing at the School of English Literature, Language and Linguistics, Newcastle University.

In September 2013, Herbert was appointed as Dundee's first makar.

== Awards and honours ==
He became a Fellow of the Royal Society of Literature in 2015.

== Books ==
=== Poetry collections ===
- Dundee Doldrums (1991)
- The Testament of the Reverend Thomas Dick (1994)
- Cabaret McGonagall (1996)
- The Laurelude (1998)
- The Big Bumper Book of Troy (2002)
- Bad Shaman Blues (2006)
- Three Men on the Metro, with Andy Croft and Paul Summers, Five Leaves (2009)
- Omnesia (2013)
- The Wreck of the Fathership (2020)

=== Literary criticism ===
- To Circumjack MacDiarmid (1992)
