= Informationist poetry =

1990s literary movement

Informationist poetry was a literary movement of the 1990s in Scotland. The poets usually associated with this movement are Richard Price (who coined the term in 1991 in the magazine Interference), Robert Crawford, W. N. Herbert, David Kinloch, Peter McCarey and Alan Riach.

The anthology Contraflow on the SuperHighway (Southfields, 1994), edited by Price and Herbert, set the parameters for the movement; Vennel Press published collections by the Informationists; and the magazines Verse, Gairfish and Southfields addressed Informationist concerns. Iain Bamforth, Kathleen Jamie, Alison Kermack and Don Paterson, though not included in the anthology, are referenced in Price's introduction as contemporaries with similar interests and aesthetics.

One of the features of Informationist poetry is its engagement with and deliberate mixing of different linguistic registers, and the interrogation of language's power-bearing qualities in the process. Informationism can be seen as a descendant of Oulipo for its creative use of rules-based procedures, notably in the work of Peter McCarey's monumental Syllabary project, which attempts a poem for every spoken syllable in the English language, randomising the presentation on its dedicated website. All the poets are also translators of poetry and internationalism and translation itself are arguably themes in their work.

Informationism can also be fruitfully grouped with the later flarf movement as both explore technological innovation, jargons of various kinds and the interconnectedness of the "information society" in an often irreverent and perhaps subversive mode. However, the combination of lyric and experimental aesthetics probably bears better comparison with American Hybrid poets such as Peter Gizzi and Harryette Mullen (after the anthology edited by Cole Swensen and David St. John in 2009). The twentieth-century poets Hugh MacDiarmid and Edwin Morgan were particularly influential on the Informationists.

In 2013 and 2014, Kinloch, McCarey and Price toured with Iain Bamforth as Informationists in "The Last Men on Mercury" tour, reading in Manchester, London, Geneva, Strasbourg and Glasgow.
