= The Glebe Farm =

Painting by John Constable

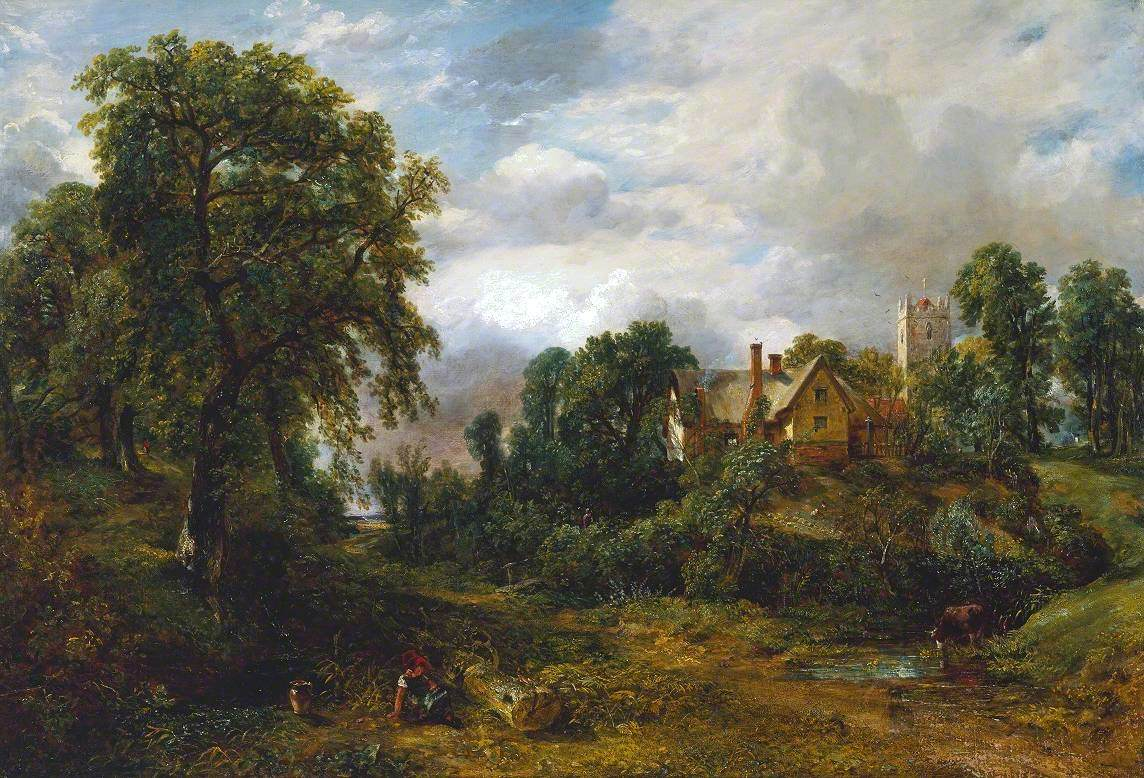
- Artist: John Constable
- Year: 1830
- Type: Oil on canvas, landscape painting
- Dimensions: 64.8 cm × 95.6 cm (25.5 in × 37.6 in)
- Location: Tate Britain, London

The Glebe Farm is an 1830 landscape painting by the British artist John Constable. It shows a view of the Glebe Farm in the village of Langham in Essex on the Stour River in what is often now known as "Constable Country". Seen clearly behind it is the tower of St Mary's Church. Constable seems to have been inspired to paint the work by the death of his patron the Bishop of Salisbury in 1825. The Bishop had been rector of Langham in the 1790s when Constable first met him.

Constable exhibited an early version of the painting at the British Institution in 1827. Today the work is in the Tate Britain in Pimlico having been donated by the artist's family in 1888 as part of the Constable Bequest. The 1827 painting is in the Detroit Institute of Arts.

== See also ==
- List of paintings by John Constable

== Bibliography ==
- Bailey, Anthony. John Constable: A Kingdom of his Own. Random House, 2012.
- Beckett, R.B. John Constable and the Fishers: The Record of a Friendship. Taylor & Francis, 2023.
- Charles, Victoria. Constable. Parkstone International, 2015.
- Hamilton, James. Constable: A Portrait. Hachette UK, 2022.
- Parris, Leslie. The Tate Gallery Constable Collection: A Catalogue. Tate Gallery Publications Department, 1981.
- Reynolds, Graham. Constable's England. Metropolitan Museum of Art, 1983.
- Thornes, John E. John Constable's Skies: A Fusion of Art and Science. A&C Black, 1999.
