= Sam White (foreign correspondent) =

Sam White (1913–1988) was a foreign correspondent who worked for the London Evening Standard in Paris. He was born in Ukraine, and grew up in Australia where he was a member of the Communist party as a student. He is most famous for working at the Crillon Bar. He wrote a book on Charles de Gaulle (De Gaulle, ISBN 0-245-54213-2, 1984).

An MI5 file on White which reveals the intelligence agency suspected him of being a Communist was recently opened at the National Archives at Kew. He is famous for the adage 'Write about statesmen as though they are nightclub singers, and the latter as though they are politicians. That way you get to the truth about their real personalities and it makes for amusing copy.'
