= Andy Croft =

English writer (born 1956)

- Born: 1956 (age 69–70)
- Occupations: Writer; editor; poet; publisher
- Known for: Founder of Smokestack Books
- Website: andy-croft.co.uk

Andy Croft (born 1956) is an English writer, editor, poet and publisher based in North East England. His books include Red Letter Days, a history of British political fiction of the 1930s. Other books written or edited by Croft include Out of the Old Earth, A Weapon in the Struggle, Selected Poems of Randall Swingler, After the Party, A Creative Approach to Teaching Rhythm and Rhyme, Forty-six Quid and a Bag of Dirty Washing, Bare Freedom and The Privatisation of Poetry. He has written seven novels and 42 books for teenagers, mostly about football.

Croft's writing residencies include the Hartlepool Headland, the Great North Run, the Southwell Poetry Festival, the Combe Down Stone Mines Project, HMP Holme House and HMP South Yorkshire. He has given many poetry readings, including readings in Paris, Moscow, Potsdam, Sofia, Novosibirsk, Kemerovo, New York, Basra and London's Poetry International. He ran the Writearound Community Writing Festival in Cleveland, the T-junction International Poetry Festival in Middlesbrough, the Ripon Poetry Festival and Smokestack Books. From 2004 to 2022, he was poetry editor at the Morning Star.

== Biography ==
Andy Croft was born in 1956 in Cheshire, in North-West England. In 1983, he moved to the North-East to teach in adult education and community writing projects.

Croft has run literary initiatives such as the Writearound Community Writing Festival in Cleveland from 1989 to 2000, the T-junction International Poetry Festival in Middlesbrough (2014–2018) and the Ripon Poetry Festival (2017–2024). From 2004 to 2022, he wrote a monthly poetry column in the Morning Star newspaper.

=== Smokestack Books ===
Croft set up Smokestack Books in 2004, "with the aim of publishing poets a long way from the centres of cultural authority, especially oppositional, dissident, unfashionable and radical poets." The company went on to publish more than 230 titles and sold in excess of 65,000 copies, with Smokestack Books authors including Michael Rosen, John Berger, Sylvia Pankhurst, Vernon Scannell, Linda France and Kate Fox, in addition to lesser known writers. Croft announced in a letter to PN Review his decision to cease publishing Smokestack Books in 2024, stating: "After twenty years of running Smokestack unfunded, unpaid and single-handed, I have run out of good reasons to remain even on the margins of the uncomradely, uncongenial and frankly embarrassing world of contemporary British poetry."

== Bibliography ==
=== Collections of poetry ===
- Nowhere Special (1996)
- Gaps Between Hills: Photographs (1996), with Mark Robinson and Dermot Blackburn
- Great North: A Poem of the Great North Run (2001)
- Just as Blue (2009)
- Comrade Laughter (2004)
- The Ghost Writer: A Novel in Verse (2008)
- Sticky (2009)
- Three Men on the Metro (2009), with W. N. Herbert and Paul Summers
- 1948: A Novel in Verse (2012) with illustrations by Martin Rowson
- Letters to Randall Swingler (2017)
- The Sailors of Ulm (2020)

=== Anthologies of poetry ===
- Red Sky at Night: An anthology of British Socialist Poetry (2003), edited with Adrian Mitchell
- North by North East: the region's contemporary poetry (2006), with Cynthia Fuller
- Not Just a Game: an anthology of sporting poems (2006), with Sue Dymoke
- Speaking English: Poems for John Lucas (2007)
- The Night Shift (2010), with Michael Baron and Jenny Swann
- Everything Flows: A Celebration of the Transporter Bridge in Poetry (2012)
- A Modern Don Juan: Cantos for these Times by Divers Hands (2015), with Nigel Thompson
- Release the Sausages! Poems for Keir Starmer (2025)
- All in the Same Boat: an anthology of anti-Fascist poetry (2026) with Francis Combes

=== Other publications ===
- smoke! an historical pageant (2004, Mudfog) – commissioned as part of the 150th anniversary of Middlesbrough.
- Comrade Heart: A Life of Randall Swingler (2003), revised 2020 as The Years of Anger
- A Creative Approach to Teaching Rhythm and Rhyme (2015)
- The Privatisation of Poetry (Broken Sleep Books, 2024), ISBN 978-1-916938-67-0
