= Caroline Trettine =

- Born: Caroline Anne Halcrow; 4 September 1958 (age 67); Kingston upon Thames, Surrey, England
- Genres: Folk rock, hip hop, classical
- Occupations: Singer-songwriter, musician
- Instruments: Vocals, guitar
- Years active: 1983–present
- Labels: Utility, Oporto Records, Tuition, Evensong, Generous
- Website: carolinetrettine.com

Caroline Anne Halcrow (born 4 September 1958), known professionally as Caroline Trettine, is an English folk singer-songwriter.

== Biography ==
She was born in Kingston upon Thames, Surrey, England, and spent the early years of her life in Nigeria. She began composing songs while still at school. After gaining a Bachelor of Arts (Hons) degree in English with French at Bristol University, she joined a folk-rock band and was discovered by Gerard Langley in 1983, who invited her to join The Blue Aeroplanes.

== Music career ==
Caroline Trettine sang and played guitar with The Blue Aeroplanes who comprised at that time: Gerard Langley, Nick Jacobs, John Langley, Angelo Bruschini and David Chapman. She then left the Blue Aeroplanes in 1985 to pursue a solo career. Securing a contract with Billy Bragg and Peter Jenner's Utility record label, she recorded the Be A Devil album in 1990, at the Cathouse studios of Grant Showbiz. Successful tours with Bragg and Christy Moore, and appearances on regional and national BBC radio were met with critical acclaim. "Like [Sandy] Denny, Trettine hovers over great melancholy with an almost detached air that only cuts closer to the quick. To be worthy of such a comparison this early on is no mean feat" (Martin Aston, Q Magazine). In the intervening years, Trettine continued to record material, experimenting with different styles and working with a range of collaborators. Though an acoustic artist, she worked closely with hip hop in the early 1990s. In 2001, she released her second album, Ten Light Years. It was recorded and produced by Richard Bell (The Blue Aeroplanes) at the label Evensong's studio. The main musicians on the album were multi-instrumentalist Ian Kearey (Oyster Band, and The Blue Aeroplanes); bass player David Chapman and guitarist Nick Jacobs (both ex Blue Aeroplanes); her father Laurence Halcrow on concertina; and her brother Ian Halcrow on vocals; plus featured producer – Gerard Langley (The Blue Aeroplanes).

In 2005, Trettine released her third album, Trail in the Sky on Oporto Records run by Spencer Roberts. She was then invited by Spencer Roberts to join The Winnebago Orchestra with whom she made two albums – Fifteen and Born in the Sun – on the German label, Tuition (Schott International), in 2006 and 2008. At the same time, she started up her own poetry band, Mirabeau, with Richard Price (a novelist and poet) and Ian Kearey. They played two introductory gigs at the Edinburgh Festival and the Centre for Contemporary Arts, Glasgow, Scotland, before releasing their first album Golden Key in May 2011. Their follow-up, Age of Exploration, was launched at the Ritzy Upstairs in mid 2015.

Since 2004, Trettine has written a number of chamber musicals, two of which – The Silver Machine, Learning to Walk – she performed at the London's Rosemary Branch Theatre, in 2007 and 2009. Most recently her musical Songbirds, composed in 2024, is being transformed into a screenplay.

In 2010, Trettine began writing classical pieces, starting with a string quartet – My Mother's War, followed by a guitar quartet – The Love bridge, 2011; and a violin/cello concerto – Conversations with Ian, 2012. Over the last decade, her interest in modern classical music has significantly evolved and she has composed a number of guitar concertos and symphonies for chamber orchestra. Along with these instrumental pieces, she regularly arranges her songs for chamber orchestra, particularly in her long form song cycles, focusing on themes such as Sappho, the war poets, Gwen John, Donatello and the Brontës.

In December 2011, she released her album, Tears, which comprised 'sudden sonnets', rap-blues pieces and her guitar/bass/drum arrangements of poetry by Lorca. David Chapman plays bass on the Lorca pieces. This album was followed in 2014 by Gay Demo: Field Recordings of the Audio Underground in which she encapsulates her experiences of the lesbian and gay community.

In 2015, Trettine formed the band Koral Society, in which she combines talents with the double bass player and composer, Alison Rayner, and the Guinean griot composer, kora player and multi-instrumentalist, Mosi Conde. Their album Waters Wide, produced by Felix Macintosh, was played on BBC Radio 6 Music and met with critical acclaim: "wistfully sweet...excellent" (Gideon Coe, BBC Radio 6 Music) and "wonderful and really lovely" (Peter Culshaw, The Arts Desk).

In 2017, Caroline and Nick Jacobs (ex Blue Aeroplane) worked together on an album Sergeant Troy. This was produced by Felix Macintosh. The album's publication has been delayed but is slated for release in 2025. The trio including drummer, Matt Rosewood, did some well received gigs around London.

The years between 2018 and 2024 were studio-based and have resulted in the creation of five solo albums. In 2024, two of these albums – Gravity of the Moon and Camino – were digitally released on 2 September. With the album Gravity of the Moon, Trettine is presenting her performance using the persona vehicle "Viola XTC".

== Discography ==
=== Albums ===
- Be a Devil, Utility, 1990
- Ten Light Years, Evensong, 2000
- Trail in the Sky, Oporto, 2006
- Fifteen, The Winnebago Orchestra, Tuition, 2006
- Born in the Sun, The Winnebago Orchestra, Tuition, 2008
- Golden Key, Mirabeau, Generous, 2011
- Tears, Generous, 2011
- Gay Demo: Field Recordings from the Audio Underground, Generous, 2014
- Age of Exploration, Mirabeau, Generous, 2015
- Waters wide, Koral Society, Generous, 2016.
- Gravity of the Moon, 2024
- Camino, 2024
