= Max Plowman =

British writer and pacifist

Mark Plowman, generally known as Max Plowman, (1 September 1883 – 3 June 1941) was a British writer and pacifist.

== Life to 1918 ==
He was born in Northumberland Park, Tottenham, Middlesex. He left school at 16, and worked for a decade in his father's brick business. He became a journalist and poet. In 1914 he married Dorothy Lloyd Sulman.

From the beginning of the First World War Plowman felt morally opposed to the fighting – "insane and unmitigated filth" – but on Christmas Eve 1914 he reluctantly volunteered for enlistment in the Territorial Army, Royal Army Medical Corps, 4th Field Ambulance. He later accepted a commission in the 10th Battalion, Yorkshire Regiment, and serving at Albert, close to the Somme on the Western Front, he suffered concussion from an exploding shell. Deemed to be affected by shell shock, he was sent home to convalesce at Bowhill Auxiliary, a branch of Craiglockhart, where he was treated by W. H. R. Rivers, although he did not meet either of Rivers' two most celebrated patients, Wilfred Owen and Siegfried Sassoon. While recovering, he produced a poetry collection, A Lap Full of Seed, and an anonymous pamphlet, The Right to Live, inveighing against the kind of society that made war inevitable. Having been granted a further month's home service in January 1918, he wrote to his battalion adjutant asking to be relieved of his commission on the grounds of religious conscientious objection to all war. He was arrested and tried by court martial on 5 April 1918 for refusing to return to his unit, his trial being covered in the Labour Leader. Having been dismissed from the Army, albeit without punishment, he was on 29 June 1918 served with notice of call-up as a conscript, but successfully applied to Hampstead Military Service Tribunal for exemption as a conscientious objector.

In July 1918 Plowman gave a positive review in the Labour Leader to Siegfried Sassoon's anti-war poetry collection Counter-Attack. It was in response to a request in a letter from Plowman that Sassoon campaigned for Philip Snowden in Blackburn, in the December 1918 General Election.

His memoir of the war A Subaltern on the Somme was published in 1928, under the pseudonym "Mark VII".

== The Adelphi ==
In 1930 Plowman joined John Middleton Murry and Richard Rees in developing The Adelphi as a socialist monthly; Murry had founded it in 1923 as a literary journal (The New Adelphi, 1927–30); Rees edited it from 1930 to 1936, when he withdrew on account of Murry's commitment to pacifism, which increasingly became the magazine's theme; Murry resumed editorship until 1938, when Plowman took on the role. The Adelphi was closely aligned with the Independent Labour Party; Jack Common worked for it as circulation promoter and assistant editor in the 1930s. In addition to the Alephi, Plowman also wrote for the publications The New Age, Peace News, Twentieth Century, Now and Then and the Theosophical journal The Aryan Path.

In 1929 George Orwell had sent The New Adelphi an article. Plowman sent Orwell books to review, founding an important friendship; and Rees was Orwell's literary executor. Plowman later got to know Orwell better through Mabel Fierz. Orwell described Plowman as "pugnacious", and although one writer has suggested that Orwell was still in agreement with Plowman's pacifism in early 1938, another has pointed out that Orwell supported the International Brigade in Spain and "was often rude about pacifists [although] he had good friends who were pacifists". Later that year Plowman introduced Orwell to Leo Myers, and set up a secret gift of £300 from Myers so that Orwell and his wife could travel to Morocco, to restore Orwell's health.

Plowman co-founded in 1934 and ran the Adelphi Centre. It was an early commune, based on a farm in Langham, Essex bought by Middleton Murry. Short-lived in its original conception, it ran a Summer School in August 1936 that was stellar: Orwell spoke on "An Outsider Sees the Distressed Areas" on 4 August, with Rayner Heppenstall in the chair. Other speakers were Steve Shaw, Herbert Read, Grace Rogers, J. Hampden Jackson, N. A. Holdaway (a Marxist theorist and schoolmaster, and a Director of the Centre), Geoffrey Sainsbury, Reinhold Niebuhr, Karl Polanyi, John Strachey, Plowman and Common.

Through it he also met the pacifist dramatist Richard Heron Ward, who from 1936 became a close friend. Ward formed the 'Adelphi Players' in 1941, who used the Adelphi Centre for rehearsals.

By 1937 the commune had collapsed, and the house, 'The Oaks', was turned over to 64 Basque refugee children under the auspices of the Peace Pledge Union; they remained until 1939.

Plowman was attracted into organising for pacifism in the later 1930s by Hugh Richard Lawrie Sheppard. He was the first General Secretary of the Peace Pledge Union 1937–1938. Murry, to whom Plowman was now close, became a pacifist after a diversion into communism. Plowman emphasised the importance of the individual conscience in an age of totalitarianism:

I am confident that if a man surrenders his conscience to his idea of community, or to his Fuhrer, it doesn't must matter whether he calls himself Communist or Fascist-he has foresworn the element in himself which alone can keep society human. And for want of that element, society must and will inevitably grow more and more barbarous. You can see it happening.

Plowman was a member of the "Forethought Committee" in the PPU, which emphasised rural community living and humanitarian service as a means of coping with the war; other members included Murry, Wilfred Wellock, Vera Brittain, Canon Charles Raven and Mary Gamble.

== Works ==
- A Lap Full of Seed (1917) poems
- The Right to Live (1917) anonymous pamphlet
- War and the Creative Impulse (1919)
- Introduction to the Study of Blake (1927)
- A Subaltern on the Somme (1928) as Mark VII
- The Faith Called Pacifism (1936)
- Bridge into the Future (1944) collected letters, edited by Dorothy Plowman
