= Jack Common =

British socialist, essayist and novelist

- Born: 15 August 1903; Heaton, Newcastle, England
- Died: 20 January 1968 (aged 64); Newport Pagnell, England
- Occupation: Writer
- Writing career
- Period: 1928–1968
- Notable works: Kiddar's Luck, The Ampersand

Jack Common (15 August 1903 – 20 January 1968) was a British socialist, essayist and novelist.

== Writing ==
Common's writing was warm, ironic and quirky. He soon won admirers throughout the 1930s as a writer with a genuine proletarian viewpoint, as distinct from the purveyors of middle-class Marxist fiction. He was invited in 1930 by John Middleton Murry, founder and editor The Adelphi, who had noticed an essay he had written, to become circulation promoter and later assistant editor of the magazine. For a period in 1936 he was acting editor, and a collection of his articles The Freedom of the Streets appeared in 1938. V.S. Pritchett considered the book to have been the most influential in his life, and George Orwell heard in the essays 'the authentic voice of the ordinary working man, the man who might infuse a new decency into the control of affairs if only he could get there, but who in practice never seems to get much further than the trenches, the sweatshop and the jail.' E. M. Forster also praised Common as a "warm-hearted, matey writer."

Common's writings about the day-to-day realities of workers lives include descriptions of how work was performed and production organized, and how knowledge was transmitted from worker to worker. Common's writing also reflects on the separation between the ideas of middle-class intellectuals and the ideas of workers. In his usual warm tone, he wrote "Very likely we will have to await the arrival of the intellectuals-in-touch, the unemployed man at present reading in public libraries, the young stoker spending the mornings of his back-shift week ploughing through Shaw and Lawrence, fumbling his way through acceptances and rejections towards a cultural consciousness which squares with this communal experience."

He inspired, prefaced and edited the compilation Seven Shifts (1938), in which seven working men told of their experience. Common and Orwell became friends, corresponding and occasionally meeting when Common was running the village shop in Datchworth, Hertfordshire, about ten miles from Orwell's Wallington cottage. The impractical Orwell asked Common's advice on setting up his own shop. After the war he was engaged in writing film scripts including Good Neighbours (1946), about a community scheme in a Scottish town; he also travelled to Newfoundland and Labrador on another film assignment.

In 1951 Turnstile Press published Common's best-known book, the autobiographical Kiddar's Luck, in which he vividly describes his childhood on the streets of Edwardian Tyneside, as seen through the lens of his adult socialism. There are four chapters on his life before five years old – a feat of detailed memory – while his mother's alcoholism and the overbearing father whom Jack at length dramatically defies, form the dark background to the vigorous, at times bravura, narrative. The book found praise as a slice of Geordie naturalism, a convincing depiction of 'the other England' which so beguiled the imagination of contemporary intellectuals. On the other hand, its irony and subtly bitter universality went largely unrecognised.

In The Ampersand (1954) Common took the story further, but his publishers went into liquidation two years later. Neither book had been a commercial success and Common had not completed the trilogy with his long-promised Riches and Rare, a novel set in Newcastle at the time of the General Strike. Too early (or too old) to be an angry young man of the 1950s, Common was unable to sustain a career in writing. His political attitudes were by now out of fashion, and when he sent the manuscript of In Whitest Britain (1961) to his friend Eric Warman in London, Warman replied in a letter of 7 June 1961 that he was sorry 'such a bloody good writer' could not achieve success. There was too much 'class distinction' in the book, and the downtrodden, golden-hearted workman was a dated 'leading cliché'. Thus Jack Common, perhaps the finest chronicler of the English working class to follow Robert Tressell, spent his last years in Newport Pagnell writing film treatments at poor rates.

== Personal life ==
=== Newcastle ===
He was born in Heaton, Newcastle upon Tyne, close to the rail-sheds where his father worked as an engine-driver. After attending Chillingham Road School, where he developed a lifelong love of Shelley, and Skerry's College, Newcastle, where he gained some secretarial skills, Common found it difficult to extend his education or get a rewarding job. He became a vigorous speaker in socialist circles at the Royal Arcade in Newcastle and began submitting articles to left-wing journals.

=== London ===
In 1928, against the wishes of his father, Common went to London with hope of a better chance of finding work than at home. After a stint as a mechanic in a machine factory, where he was sacked for making suggestions to improve work procedures, he was invited in 1930 by Murry, founder and editor The Adelphi, who had noticed an essay he had written, to become circulation promoter and later assistant editor of the magazine. At this time Common and his partner, Mary Anderson (1901–1942), a childhood friend from Newcastle who went south to join him, had a son, Peter; another son, Robert, was born later. Though they never married, touching love letters survive from their courtship. Common was poor enough by now to be subsidised by Orwell on occasion, and when the latter was in Morocco in 1938 Common and Mary Anderson looked after the Wallington cottage.

In 1939, during the editorship of Max Plowman (1938–1941), Common left The Adelphi, which by now had become a significant socialist/pacifist publication, closely allied to the Peace Pledge Union. At some time during the Second World War Common moved Peter to Frating Community Farm in Essex, where conscientious objectors, Quakers and refugees attempted to avoid contributing to the war effort by self-sustaining farming. Though many of the men had been in heavy rescue and ambulance work during the Blitz and the women in the Land Army.

Mary died in 1942 from cancer, and Common began living with and eventually married Constance Helena (Connie) Wood, née Sambidge (1902–1979), who had a son Jan from her first marriage to Gilbert Wood, another Newcastle friend of his youth. Their first daughter Caroline Alison (Sally) was born in 1944, followed by twin daughters Mary and Charmian, born in 1946. Meanwhile, Common took part in a number of wartime BBC radio broadcasts, including a lively debate, 'What Matters?', broadcast on 19 June 1942, which featured two opposing sets of speakers representing, roughly, suburbia and 'the streets'. Common remarked: 'I like a good argument'. The family changed residence several times, ending up in a council house at 32 Warren Hamlet, Storrington, Sussex, with Common trying to make ends meet by working at a mushroom nursery, while toiling over scripts and reviews at night, and writing for himself in between. He was acutely oppressed by financial insecurity—and the lack of beer and tobacco.

=== Later life ===
In 1956 Common embarked upon a two-year stint as guide to Chastleton House in the Cotswolds, a position obtained for him through Sir Richard Rees (editor of Adelphi, 1930–1938). Predictable disagreements with the owner, Alan Clutton-Brock, put an end to an arrangement whereby Common had been able to get some writing done in the winter months.

In 1958 a friend from Frating days, Irene Palmer, was instrumental in obtaining a rented Georgian house at 14 St John Street, in the centre of Newport Pagnell. There Common spent hours working on books for film treatment reviews in the 'garden' (a cemetery), walking with Connie in the countryside they both loved, and reading to his children. His daughter Sally later recalled listening to Shelley and Omar Khayyam in the translation of Edward FitzGerald, whose atheistic stance Common was at pains to emphasise. He had always been interested in astronomy (his Uncle Robin was a flat-earther), and Fred Hoyle's theory of an endlessly self-renewing universe, which dispensed with a creator, was attractive.

Common was not a joiner or an activist, nor did he encourage his children to be so. He did, however, blossom in the right setting, often in pubs (a favourite was The Bull in Newport Pagnell), where he enjoyed political arguments with self-taught thinkers like himself. Another favourite haunt was the nearby working men's club on Silver Street, where he took his slippered ease at the bar. He was a connoisseur of beer and was described by his friend Tommy McCulloch as 'fairly jolly' at this period, though he retained his hatred of the 'bulky bourgeoisie' – and kept his Newcastle accent.

He died of lung cancer in 1968, leaving a mass of unpublished material, which forms the Jack Common Archive, now held in Special Collections at Newcastle University Library.

== In popular culture ==
Sculptor Laurence Bradshaw used Common's brow as a model for his bust of Karl Marx in Highgate Cemetery, saying that he found there a similar patience and understanding.

The folk singer/songwriter Jez Lowe has an album entitled Jack Common's Anthem, containing a song of the same name.

In 2009, North-East poet and scholar Keith Armstrong published Common Words and the Wandering Star, about Jack Common and his work. He has drawn extensively on the archive.

North East folk band, Kiddars Luck, formed by John Dixon, Colin McLelland and Mike Davidson have a track on their album, Where the Red Kites Fly, called "Jack The Lad" dedicated to Jack Common. The band take their name from Jack Common's first autobiographical novel "Kiddar's Luck"

== Bibliography ==
- Seven Shifts (ed.) (Secker & Warburg, 1938; EP Publishing, 1978)
- Freedom Of The Streets (1938; People’s Publications, 1988)
- Kiddar’s Luck (Turnstile Press, 1951; Frank Graham, 1975; Bloodaxe Books, 1990)
- The Ampersand (Turnstile Press, 1954; Frank Graham, 1975)
- Revolt Against An Age Of Plenty (Strong Words, 1979)
