= John Middleton Murry =

English writer (1889–1957)

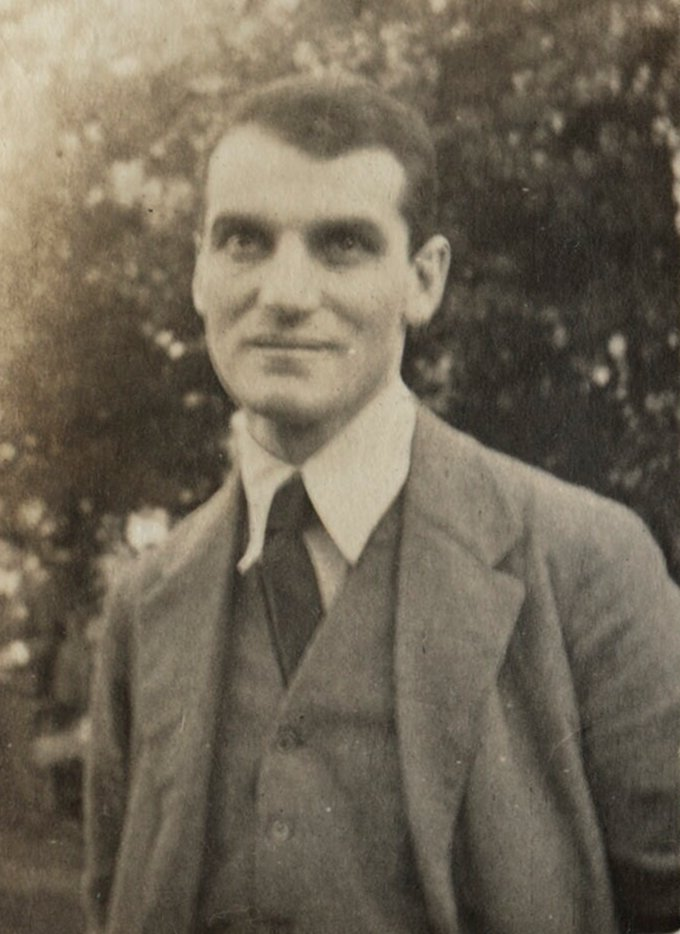
- A 1917 photograph of Murry by Lady Ottoline Morrell
- Born: 6 August 1889; Peckham, London, England
- Died: 13 March 1957 (aged 67); West Suffolk Hospital, Bury St Edmunds, England
- Resting place: Thelnetham, England
- Education: Christ's Hospital; Brasenose College, Oxford
- Spouse: Katherine Mansfield (m. 1918; died 1923) Violet Le Maistre (m. 1924; died 1931) Ada Elizabeth Cockbayne (m. 1931) Mary Gamble (m. 1954)
- Children: 4, including John Middleton Murry Jr.

John Middleton Murry (6 August 1889 – 12 March 1957) was an English writer. He was a prolific author, producing more than 60 books and thousands of essays and reviews on literature, social issues, politics, and religion during his lifetime. A prominent critic, Murry is best remembered for his association with Katherine Mansfield, whom he married in 1918 as her second husband, for his friendship with D. H. Lawrence and T. S. Eliot, and for his friendship (and brief affair) with Frieda Lawrence. Following Mansfield's death, Murry edited her work.

== Early life ==
John Middleton Murry was born in Peckham, London, on 6 August 1889 to John Murry (1860/1–1947), a clerk in the Inland Revenue, and Emily Wheeler (1869/70–1951). John Murry, a self-made man from an "impoverished and illiterate" background, prioritized his son's education. At the age of two, Murry was sent to the Roles Road Board School, and afterward attended the Bellendon Road Higher Grade Board School. When he was aged 11, his aunt referred to him as a "little old man". By 1893, his parents moved from Peckham to East Dulwich, along with his mother's sister and their mother, into a shared house. Beginning in 1901, Murry was educated at Christ's Hospital, where he received a scholarship. There, he and friends purchased a jellygraph machine for a newspaper he was the editor-in-chief of, and at 18 he became the editor of the school's magazine. When he was 16 and at Christ's Hospital, he was awarded the Charles Lamb medal for an essay entitled "Literature and Journalism". He attended Brasenose College, Oxford. There he met the writer Joyce Cary, a lifelong friend.

He met Katherine Mansfield at the end of 1911, through W. L. George. His intense relationship with her, her early death, and his subsequent allusions to it, shaped both his later life and the attitudes (often hostile) of others to him. Leonard Woolf in his memoirs called Murry "Pecksniffian". By 1933 his reputation "had touched bottom", and Rayner Heppenstall's short book of 1934, John Middleton Murry: A Study in Excellent Normality, could note that he was "the best-hated man of letters in the country".

== Editor ==
Murry was editor of the literary magazine Rhythm from 1911 to 1913, and then The Blue Review. In 1913 an associate, the publisher Charles Granville of Stephen Swift Ltd, was found guilty of embezzlement and bigamy, and imprisoned. Some debts had been put in Murry's name, and their finances were seriously affected for the next six years. In 1914 he met D. H. Lawrence, and became an important supporter. The next year they started a short-lived magazine together, The Signature. In 1931, after a complex evolution of the relationship, Murry wrote in Son of Woman one of the first and most influential posthumous assessments of Lawrence as a man. Medically certified as unfit for military service, with pleurisy and possible tuberculosis, during the war years he was part of the Garsington circle of Ottoline Morrell.

In 1919, Murry became the editor of The Athenaeum, recently purchased by Arthur Rowntree. Under his editorship it was a literary review featuring work by T. S. Eliot, Virginia Woolf, Lytton Strachey, Clive Bell, and other members of the Bloomsbury Group. It had enthusiastic support from E. M. Forster, who later wrote that "Here at last was a paper that was a pleasure to read and an honour to write for, and which linked up literature and life". Lasting until 1921, it merged into The Nation, which became The Nation and Athenaeum, in the period 1923 to 1930 edited by H. D. Henderson. In 1923 he became the founding editor of The Adelphi (The New Adelphi, 1927–30), in association with Jack Common and Max Plowman. The magazine continued in various forms until 1948. It reflected his successive interests in Lawrence, an unorthodox Marxism, pacifism, and a return to the land. According to David Goldie, Murry and the Adelphi, and Eliot and The Criterion, were in an important rivalry by the mid-1920s, with competing definitions of literature, based respectively on romanticism allied to liberalism and a subjective approach, and a form of classicism allied to traditionalism and a religious attitude. In this contest, Goldie says, Eliot emerged a clear victor in the sense that, in London during the 1930s, Eliot had taken the centre of the critical stage.

== Critic ==
Murry reviewed for The Westminster Gazette and then The Times Literary Supplement, from 1912. Initially he was much influenced by the philosophy of Henri Bergson, which he disavowed in 1913. He was one of an identified group of post-World War I critics that included Richard Aldington, Robert Graves, Aldous Huxley, Herbert Read, and Edgell Rickword. Murry gave Huxley an editorial job at The Athenaeum. Murry also helped encourage British interest in the work of Fyodor Dostoyevsky: his 1916 work Fyodor Dostoevsky: A Critical Study argued Dostoyevsky was an important novelist and philosophical thinker.

Murry led the charge against Georgian poetry. A leader in the 16 May 1919 edition of The Athenaeum was an early example of a reasoned attack against the Georgian style of verse; and Murry coupled this with an adversarial attitude to The London Mercury edited by J. C. Squire. He reviewed quite harshly Siegfried Sassoon's Counter-Attack in 1918, despite having helped him in 1917 to draft an anti-war piece for H. W. Massingham's The Nation. In-house, however, he was not master enough to award an essay competition prize to the then-unknown Herbert Read, over the wishes of George Saintsbury and Robert Bridges, who preferred the poet William Orton.

F. R. Leavis admired and was influenced by Murry's early criticism; later he criticised Murry in the pages of Scrutiny, but continued to acknowledge a debt to him late in life.

== On Romanticism ==
Murry gave his philosophy its fullest expression in his writings on Keats and Shakespeare and in an ambitiously titled volume, God: An Introduction to the Science of Metabiology. There, picking up certain concepts from his acquaintance George Santayana, Murry describes the project of Romanticism as one of inner exploration:

"To discover that within myself which I *must obey, to gain some awareness of the law which operates in the organic world of the internal world, to feel this internal world as an organic whole working out its own destiny according to some secret vital principle, to know which acts and utterances are a liberation from obstacles and an accession of strength, to acknowledge secret loyalties which one cannot deny without impoverishment and starvation – this is to possess one's soul indeed, and it is not easy either to do or to explain."

The upshot of this discovery results in the highest degree of ethical awareness, "an immediate knowledge of what I am and may not do." The awareness of one being "really alone" in the universe, as he put it, marks the final point of discovery which is followed by the upward ascent to spiritual life.

Murry vividly narrates this exploration as a spiritual conversion (in his 1929 book GOD) —what he describes as a "desolation" followed by "illumination" - after the death of Katherine Mansfield (who had moved to G. I. Gurdjieff's Institute for the Harmonious Development of Man, where she died).

== The Adelphi ==
In 1930 Max Plowman joined Murry and Sir Richard Rees in developing The Adelphi as a socialist, and later pacifist, monthly; Murry had founded it in 1923 as a literary journal (The New Adelphi, 1927–30). Rees edited it from 1930; Plowman took on the role in 1938. The Adelphi was closely aligned with the Independent Labour Party; Jack Common worked for it as circulation promoter and assistant editor in the 1930s. Throughout this period, Murry's close friend and protégé, Guernsey-born G. B. Edwards, was a regular contributor to the magazine. Thanks to Murry's support, Jonathan Cape commissioned Edwards to write a book on D.H. Lawrence but following Lawrence's death it was never completed.

He moved to Norfolk; to South Acre; and then, with his third marriage in 1931, to the Old Rectory, Larling. Murry told Antony Alpers the biographer of Katherine Mansfield that her manuscripts had all been "dispersed to collectors" in the 1930s. He had the manuscripts of nine or ten completed stories, and when an admirer wrote to ask if he would sell a manuscript, he would reply that some land adjoining his farm in Norfolk was on the market or that he needed a tractor, so would sell one for the amount he required.

Plowman co-founded (in 1934) and ran the Adelphi Centre. It was an early commune, based on a farm in Langham, Essex bought by Murry. Short-lived in its original conception, it ran a Summer School in August 1936 that was stellar: George Orwell spoke on "An Outsider Sees the Distressed Areas" on 4 August, with Rayner Heppenstall in the chair. Other speakers were Steve Shaw, Herbert Read, Grace Rogers, J. Hampden Jackson, N. A. Holdaway (a Marxist theorist and schoolmaster, and a director of the centre), Geoffrey Sainsbury, Reinhold Niebuhr, Karl Polanyi, John Strachey, Plowman and Common.

By 1937 the commune had collapsed, and the house, 'The Oaks', was turned over to some 60 Basque refugee children under the auspices of the Peace Pledge Union; they remained until 1939.

== Lodge Farm, Thelnetham ==
In October 1942 Murry set up a new commune at Lodge Farm in the Suffolk village of Thelnetham. Murry purchased the farm and recruited fellow conscientious objectors to run the enterprise. The commune had mixed fortunes and it gradually reverted to a more conventional arrangement with Murry running the farm as a commercial enterprise. He wrote an account of his time at Lodge Farm in the book "Community Farm" which was published in 1953 and was illustrated by his brother, the artist Richard Murry.

== Political views ==
=== Marxist ===
Murry had a Marxist phase in the early 1930s. With his third marriage in 1931, he moved within Norfolk, from South Acre to the Old Rectory, Larling, and wrote in two weeks his The Necessity of Communism. It was this identification as "mystical Marxist" that led Bert Trick (1889–1968) to introduce Dylan Thomas to Murry, in 1933. The occasion went well enough for Richard Rees to publish Thomas in the Adelphi.

He supported the small Independent Socialist Party, a regional breakaway from the Independent Labour Party.

=== Pacifist ===
Murry was an outspoken radical Christian and pacifist, writing The Necessity of Pacifism (1937). He was a Sponsor of the Peace Pledge Union, and editor of its weekly newspaper, Peace News, from 1940 to 1946.

Murry's opinions during this period often provoked controversy. He angered many left-wingers (including George Orwell and Vera Brittain) by arguing that Nazi Germany should be allowed to retain control of mainland Europe. Murry believed even though Nazi rule was tyrannical, it was preferable to the horrors of total war. Murry later "renounced his pacifism in 1948 and...urged a preventative war against the Soviet Union, ending his life as a Conservative voter". Finally Murry's opposition to the Soviet Union was attacked by pro-Soviet elements in the peace movement.

Murry's anti-feminism also drew criticism from feminist pacifists such as Brittain and Sybil Morrison.

=== Christianity ===
During this period Murry was widely known as a Christian intellectual. He had in fact considered ordination as an Anglican priest, but gave up on it after a diagnosis in 1938 of Buerger's disease, coupled with doubts about his marriages (his third was then breaking up messily).

=== Elitism ===
His views converged with those of Eliot: he supported a type of elitism foreshadowed by Samuel Taylor Coleridge's clerisy, and argued for by Matthew Arnold. In Christianity and Culture, Eliot partially supported Murry's reasoning from The Price of Leadership (1939), though stopping short of the endorsement of Arnold. When Murry died, Eliot wrote to Mary that 'a very warm affection existed between us'.

== Family ==
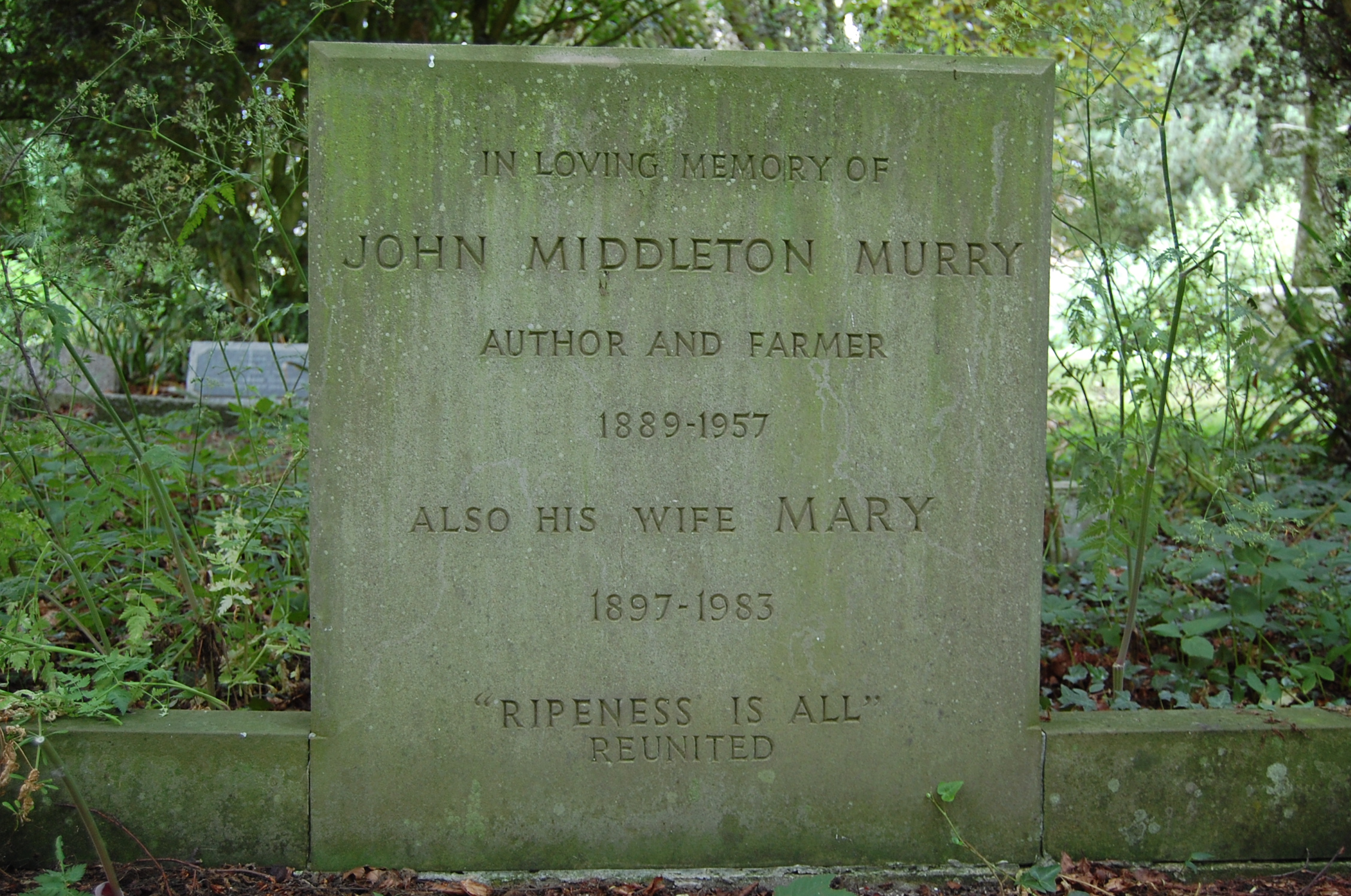
Grave of John Middleton Murry at Thelnetham Church in Suffolk

Murry was married four times: first to Katherine Mansfield in 1918; after her death in 1923 he arranged the publishing or republishing of her works. In 1924 he married Violet Le Maistre, in 1932 Ada Elizabeth Cockbaine, and in 1954 Mary Gamble. With his second wife, Violet Le Maistre, he had two children: a daughter, Katherine Violet Middleton Murry who became a writer and published Beloved Quixote: The Unknown Life of John Middleton Murry in 1986, and a son, John Middleton Murry Jr., who became a writer under the names of Colin Murry and Richard Cowper. There were also two children from the third marriage.

== Depictions ==
=== In fiction ===
Aldous Huxley portrayed him as "Denis Burlap" in Point Counter Point (1928). He was the model for Philip Surrogate in Graham Greene's 1934 novel It's a Battlefield; Greene did not know him personally. David Holbrook wrote that Gudrun and Gerald in Lawrence's Women in Love were based on Mansfield and Murry. D. H. Lawrence satirised him in a number of short stories. In Lawrence's novel Aaron's Rod (1922), the title character is based on Murry. The relationship between Lilly and Aaron in the novel mirrors that of Lawrence and Murry.

=== Dramatic portrayals ===
Murry appears as a character in Amy Rosenthal's D.H. Lawrence biodrama On the Rocks. In the 2008 Hampstead Theatre production Murry was played by Nick Caldecott with Ed Stoppard as Lawrence and Charlotte Emmerson as Mansfield.

In Priest of Love (1981), he is portrayed by Mike Gwilym. In Leave All Fair (1985), he is portrayed by John Gielgud as a sanctimonious exploiter of Mansfield's memory who treated her poorly during their association.

== See also ==
- List of peace activists

== Works ==
Non-Fiction

- Fyodor Dostoevsky: A Critical Study (1916).
- The Evolution of an Intellectual (1920).
- Aspects of Literature (1920), revised edition 1945
- Countries of the Mind: Essays in Literary Criticism (1922).
- Pencillings (1922).
- The Problem of Style (1922).
- Wrap Me Up in My Aubusson Carpet (1924).
- Discoveries (1924).
- To the Unknown God (1925).
- Keats and Shakespeare (1925).
- The Life of Jesus (1926).
- Things to Come (1928).
- God: An Introduction to the Science of Metabiology (1929).
- D .H. Lawrence (1930).
- Son of Woman: The Story of D. H. Lawrence (1931).
- Studies in Keats (1931).
- Countries of the Mind: Essays in Literary Criticism. Second Series (1931).
- The Necessity of Communism (1932).
- Reminiscences of D.H. Lawrence (1933).
- William Blake (1933).
- The Biography of Katherine Mansfield (1933) with Ruth E. Mantz
- Between Two Worlds (1935) (autobiography)
- Marxism (1935).
- Shakespeare (1936).
- The Necessity of Pacifism (1937).
- Heaven and Earth (1938).
- Heroes of Thought (1938).
- The Pledge of Peace (1938).
- The Defence of Democracy (1939).
- The Price of Leadership (1939).
- Europe in Travail (1940).
- The Betrayal of Christ by the Churches (1940).
- Christocracy (1942).
- Adam and Eve (1944).
- The Free Society (1948).
- Looking Before and After: A Collection of Essays (1948).
- The Challenge of Schweitzer (1948).
- Katherine Mansfield and Other Literary Portraits (1949).
- The Mystery of Keats (1949).
- John Clare and other Studies (1950).
- The Conquest of Death (1951).
- Community Farm (1952).
- Jonathan Swift (1955).
- Unprofessional Essays (1956).
- Love, Freedom and Society (1957).
- Not as the Scribes (1959).
- John Middleton Murry: Selected Criticism 1916–1957 (1960) editor Richard Rees

Fiction

- Still Life (1916).
- The Things We Are (1922).
- The Voyage (1924).

Verse

- Poems: 1917–18 (1918).
- The Critic in Judgement (1919).
- Cinnamon & Angelica (1920).
- Poems: 1916–1920 (1921).

As editor

- Journal of Katherine Mansfield (1927).
- The Letters of Katherine Mansfield (1928).

== Notes ==
Media offices
Preceded by Humphrey Moore	Editor of Peace News; 1940–1946	Succeeded by Frank Lea
