= The Adelphi =

1923 English literary magazine

- Former editors: John Middleton Murry, Richard Rees, Max Plowman
- Categories: literary journal
- Frequency: monthly
- Founder: John Middleton Murry
- First issue: June 1923; 101 years ago
- Final issue: 1955
- Country: United Kingdom

The Adelphi or New Adelphi was an English literary journal founded by John Middleton Murry and published between 1923 and 1955. The first issue appeared in June 1923, with issues published monthly thereafter. Between August 1927 and September 1930 it was renamed the New Adelphi and issued quarterly. Murry was editor until 1930, when he handed over to Sir Richard Rees and the monthly issues resumed. Rees was succeeded by Max Plowman in 1938. The magazine included one or two stories per issue with contributions by Katherine Mansfield, A.A. Milne, D. H. Lawrence, H. E. Bates, Rhys Davies, G.B. Edwards and Dylan Thomas. The Adelphi published George Orwell's "The Spike" in 1931 and Orwell contributed regularly thereafter, particularly as a reviewer; in the late 1930s/early 1940s, working class writers Jack Common and Jack Hilton also contributed.

The name means "siblings" in Greek.
