= Sir Richard Rees, 2nd Baronet =

British diplomat, writer, humanitarian, and painter

Richard Rees

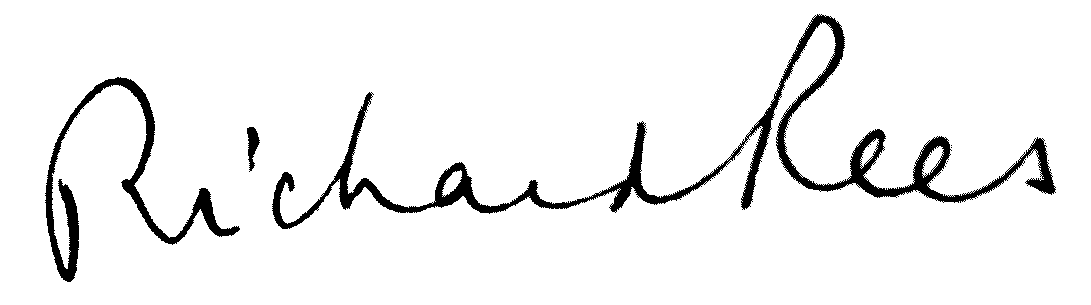

Sir Richard Lodowick Edward Montagu Rees, 2nd Baronet (4 April 1900 – 24 July 1970) was a British diplomat, writer, humanitarian and painter.

== Life ==
Rees was the son of Sir John Rees, 1st Baronet and his wife Mary Catherine Dormer. His sister was the pilot Rosemary Rees, Lady du Cros, MBE. He was educated at West Downs School, Eton and Trinity College, Cambridge. Reflecting on his education, Rees later remarked:

"Without intending any disrespect to the great university, or to Eton, where I had studied from 1914 to 1918, or to my parents, I attribute it to a kindly providence rather than to any of them that I was not recognisably a cretin. Emerging from a disharmonious family background, I was certainly a lamentable milksop; I was a mathematical dunce, which had seemed to worry nobody at Eton; I was slightly above the average in most other subjects; and I was a "problem-adult", though not immediately recognisable as such..."

Rees's father, who had been an administrator in British India and a Liberal (later Conservative) politician, died in 1922, and Rees inherited the baronetcy. He was for a while an attache at the British Embassy in Berlin. Having in the interim become a member of the Labour Party, in 1925 Rees became a lecturer at the Workers' Educational Association in London, and also acted as Treasurer there.

John Middleton Murry appointed him editor of Adelphi in 1930, where he provided encouragement to George Orwell among others. Rees followed Murry into the Independent Labour Party when it disaffiliated from Labour soon afterwards, although he considered this to be an "error" even at the time. He was the inspiration for the wealthy Ravelston, publisher of the socialist magazine Antichrist, in Orwell's Keep the Aspidistra Flying.

When the Spanish Civil War broke out in 1936 Rees joined the Spanish Medical Aid Committee, formed to send medical help to the Republicans fighting Franco. As one of the first to volunteer, he became a member of the British Medical Unit (BMU) and was sent to Catalonia to drive ambulances. As he recalled:

"I arrived in Barcelona in April 1937 in a mixed state of exaltation and despair and wearing a brand-new ambulance driver's outfit in which a cynical friend in London had pretended to mistake me for one of Hitler's Brownshirts. My exaltation sprang from the thought that I was preparing to risk my life for socialism, or the European working class, or something, and my despair from a more down-to-earth appreciation of my motives."

Even his "exaltation" turned into disillusion once Communist activists led by Alexander Tudor-Hart took over the operation, and wary of being thought of as a "Communist stooge" Rees resigned from the BMU and instead joined the Quakers' Spanish relief organisation. He also worked closely with the National Joint Committee for Spanish Relief (NJC), travelling to Mexico in June 1939 as the NJC's delegate to meet the SS Sinaia, an oceanliner co-chartered by the NJC to send sixteen hundred Spanish refugees from the camps in France to resettle in Mexico.

During World War II, Rees served in the Royal Naval Volunteer Reserve (RNVR). His service included an attachment to the French Navy from 1943, serving as a Liaison Officer (LO) on board ships of the newly-integrated Mediterranean Fleet, with whom he was awarded the Croix de Guerre.

As well as writing several books, he translated the works of Simone Weil and was the literary executor of George Orwell and R. H. Tawney. In addition to writing, he was a painter, exhibiting at the Royal Academy.

== Publications ==
- Brave Men: A study of D H Lawrence and Simone Weil (Victor Gollancz, London, 1958)
- For Love or Money (Secker & Warburg, London, 1960)
- George Orwell: Fugitive from the Camp of Victory (Secker & Warburg, London, 1961)
- A Theory of my Time (Secker & Warburg, London, 1963)
- Simone Weil: A Sketch for a Portrait (Oxford University Press, London, 1966)

Edited with John Middleton Murry

- Selected criticism 1916 to 1957 (Oxford University Press, London, 1960)
- Poets, Critics, Mystics (Feffer & Simons, London & Amsterdam, 1970)

Translations with Jane Degras

- Alfred Grosser Western Germany: From defeat to rearmament (George Allen & Unwin, London, 1955)
- Jules Monnerot Sociology of Communism (George Allen & Unwin, London, 1953)
- Simone Weil Selected Essays (Oxford University Press, London, 1962)
- Simone Weil Seventy Letters (Oxford University Press, London, 1965)
- Simone Weil On Science, Necessity, and the Love of God (Oxford University Press, London, 1968)
- Simone Weil First and Last Notebooks (Oxford University Press, London, 1970

== Arms ==
Coat of arms of Sir Richard Rees, 2nd Baronet
Crest A demi-lion rampant erased Azure charged on the shoulder with a plate thereon a cross Gules. Escutcheon Argent a chevron Sable between three ravens Proper on a chief of the second between two plates each charged with a cross Gules a like plate charged with a demi-lion rampant erased Azure. Motto Deus Alit Eos (God Nourishes Them)

Baronetage of the United Kingdom
Preceded by John Rees	Baronet (of Aylward's Chase); 1922–1970	Extinct
