= The Poetry Business =

UK poetry publisher, established 1986

- Founded: 1986; 40 years ago
- Founder: Peter Sansom
- Country of origin: United Kingdom
- Headquarters location: Sheffield, England
- Key people: Peter Sansom; Ann Sansom
- Publication types: Books; Pamphlets
- Fiction genres: Poetry
- Imprints: Smith/Doorstop; The New Poets List; Small/Donkey
- Official website: poetrybusiness.co.uk

The Poetry Business are an independent press, and a writer development agency, based in Sheffield. Since 1986, they have run workshops, mentorships, competitions and more. The poet duo Peter and Ann Sansom are the directors of the Poetry Business.

== About ==
The Poetry Business were established in 1986 out of a Victorian arcade in Huddersfield, and for the past fifteen years, have been "headquartered just a stone's throw from Sheffield's historic cathedral." They publish The North magazine, which was 70 issues old in August 2024, and several imprints, and their poets "have won or been shortlisted for almost every major poetry prize, including the Forward Prize on 11 occasions and 10 Poetry Book Society awards". In 2016, four of their titles, Mark Pajak's Spitting Distance, Geraldine Clarkson's Dora Incites The Sea-Scribber to Lament, Tom Sastry's Complicity, and Zeina Hashem Beck's There Was And How Much There Was, were named The Poetry School's Books of the Year. The press themselves have won the Michael Marks Award for Pamphlet Publishers in 2012 and 2017.

The press was incorporated in 1991, and the team has previously included Janet Fisher (until 2008) and Ellen McLeod as co-directors alongside Peter and Ann Sansom. Until 2021, McLeod served as the third co-director and business manager for The Poetry Business, alongside the Sansoms serving as the directors. In 2025, as they are approaching their fortieth year, the team is made up of Jessica (Jess) Rollitt, serving as office manager, Pete Hebden, as marketing manager, Matthew Paul, who organises and manages guest-tutored workshops, the poet Holly Hopkins serving as assistant editor, Keith Lauchlan, who is involved in typesetting, book design and production, and Katherine Sansom, the daughter of the Sansoms, in charge of finance. The press are one of the few in the North of England, alongside And Other Stories in Sheffield, Peepal Tree in Leeds, Valley Press in Scarborough, Comma Press in Manchester and Dead Ink in Liverpool.

=== The North ===
The North's name serves as "a clear nod to the firm's regional roots." Its first issue, appearing in the 1980s, which was considered "a key time for Northern poetry", included work by such poets as Carol Ann Duffy and Michael Schmidt, and has since gone on to have great names, including Andrew McMillan and others, as editors.

Now approaching their fortieth year, The Poetry Business have announced that they "will publish an anthology of the best work from four decades of the North", which will include some of the best-known names in poetry from around the world.

=== Activities ===
The Poetry Business have often participated in local and national events, such as festivals, where their poets have performed their work. The Poetry Business also run around a hundred workshops annually, and in July and August 2024, they organised several online workshops with such poets as Schmidt, who was then 77 years old, Jonathan Edwards and David Constantine. They recently worked with the poet Sarah Wimbush and the National Coal Mining Museum for England, to produce an anthology of poetry to mark the 40th anniversary of the Miners' Strike. The COAL Anthology, noted as "a moving and impactful tribute to the resilience and spirit of our mining communities", includes work from poets Simon Armitage, Liz Berry, Helen Mort, and newer voices. In 2012, paying tribute to steel city, the Press published The Sheffield Anthology: Poems from the City Imagined, which included work from Duffy, Armitage, Mort, Roger McGough, Ian McMillan, and more. In 2021, they announced a call for submissions for two poetry collections "to be edited by [the then] Apprentice Editor-in-Residence Gboyega Odubanjo as part of their 'Apart Together' 2021 project." The two collections published as a result were Helen Seymour's The Underlook, and Sarah Barnsley's The Thoughts.

Since 2021, they've gone on to work with The Writing Squad on a series of digital residencies. The first Poet In Residence, hosted throughout February, was Helen Bowell. In 2024, an anthology, titled Five: a poetry anthology, was published by the press as part of their New Poets List. It included poems by five young poets: Helen Bowell, Prerana Kumar, Eva Lewis, Laura Potts and Ruth Yates. In November 2025, they published The Poems: Forty Poems from Forty Years of The North, and 100 Poems on the Underground in January 2026. The latter is be "the 40th anniversary edition of Poems on the Underground".

Other anthologies published by the press have included The Result Is What You See Today: Poems About Running (2019), curated by Ben Wilkinson, Kim Moore and Paul Deaton, with work by such poets as Lucy Holt, Rishi Dastidar, Stuart Barnes, Olga Dermott-Bond, Abeer Ameer, Lewis Buxton, A E Housman, Helen Mort, Wendy Pratt, and Jeffrey Hill, among others; A Commonplace: Apples, Bricks & Other People's Poems (2020), curated by Jonathan Davidson with his own work and that of Roz Goddard, Zaffar Kunial, Kit Wright, Jackie Kay, and others; Spit Out the Myth: Three Sheffield Poets (2023), including work by Danae Wellington, Sile Sibanda and Warda Yassin; Strange Cargo: Five Australian Poets (2017), edited by Paul Munden, with work by Lucy Dougan, Cassandra Atherton, Paul Hetherington, Jen Webb and Sarah Holland-Batt; CAST: The Poetry Business Book of New Contemporary Poets (2014), which was edited by Simon Armitage, Joanna Gavins, and Ann and Peter Sansom, with work by Liz Berry, Andrew McMillan, David Tait, Tom Warner and Kim Moore, among others; and more. The publication of Strange Cargo coincided with a poetry reading by UK, US and Australian poets, and marked an important partnership between the press and the International Poetry Studies Institute (IPSI), based in the Faculty of Arts and Design at the University of Canberra.

The press often work with the former and the current poet laureates Carol Ann Duffy and Simon Armitage, who were both first published by them, with Armitage's pamphlet Human Geography also being the press's first. In 2016, a Guardian article mentioned the press among some "of the best poetry publishing" in the UK.

== Competitions ==
The Poetry Business run several annual literary competitions, including the International Book & Pamphlet Competition, and the New Poets Prize.

=== The New Poets Prize ===
The New Poets Prize is "an annual pamphlet prize that creates new publishing and mentoring opportunities for poets between the ages of 17 and 24." It was launched in 2015, and has since been judged by such poets as Helen Mort, Andrew McMillan, Anthony Anaxagorou, Kayo Chingonyi, Mary Jean Chan, Luke Kennard, Kim Moore and Holly Hopkins. The Prize runs annually alongside the renowned Poetry Business International Book & Pamphlet Competition. One of the press's imprints, the New Poets List, is dedicated to publishing the New Poets Prize winners, which include:

==== 2015/16 (Judge: Helen Mort) ====
Sources:

- Imogen Cassells, for The Fire Manifesto
- Jenny Danes, for Gaps
- Theophilus Kwek, for The First Five Storms
- Phoebe Stuckes, for Gin & Tonic

==== 2016/17 (Judge: Andrew McMillan) ====
- Ian Burnette, for Wax
- Sarah Fletcher, for Typhoid August
- Lizzie Hawkins, for Osteology
- Stefan Kielbasiewicz, for Stealing Shadow

==== 2017/18 (Judge: Kayo Chingonyi) ====
- Joe Carrick-Varty, for Somewhere Far
- Emma Jeremy, for Safety Behaviour
- Tristram Fane Saunders, for Woodsong
- Warda Yassin, for Tea with Cardamom

==== 2018/19 (Judge: Mary Jean Chan) ====
Sources:

- Jay Gao, for Katabasis (earlier reported as Scheherazade)
- Abbie Neale, for Threadbare
- Ben Ray, for The Kindness of the Eel
- Callan Waldron-Hall, for Learning to be Very Soft

==== 2019/20 (Judge: Luke Kennard) ====
- Lauren Hollingsworth-Smith, for Ugly Bird
- Lucy Holt, for Have a nice weekend I think you're interesting
- Gboyega Odubanjo, for Aunty Uncle Poems
- Georgie Woodhead, for Takeaway

==== 2020/21 (Judge: Kim Moore) ====
- Hannah Hodgson, for Queen of Hearts
- Safia Khan, for Too Much Mirch
- Charlotte Shevchenko Knight, for Ways of Healing
- Karl Knights, for Kin

==== 2021/22 (Judge: Anthony Anaxagorou) ====
- Serena Alagappan, for Sensitive to Temperature
- Tom Branfoot, for This Is Not an Epiphany
- Beth Davies, for The Pretence of Understanding
- Chloe Elliott, for Encyclopaedia

==== 2022/23 (Judge: Kim Moore) ====
- Winner: Freya Bantiff, for All Appears Ordinary
- Winner: Caleb Leow, for The Hoarders
- Runner-up: Imogen Wade, for Fire Safety
- Runner-up: Luke Worthy, for On What Could Sting

==== 2023/24 (Judge: Holly Hopkins) ====
Sources:

- Winner: Jayant Kashyap, for Notes on Burials
- Winner: Cia Mangat, for Lobe
- Runner-up: Zelda Cahill-Patten, for Surgeon Songs
- Runner-up: Charlie Jolley, for The Dreamers

==== 2025/26 (Judge: Holly Hopkins) ====
- Winner: Zelda Cahill-Patten, for Scare
- Winner: Joe Wright, for HOWK
- Runner-up: George Adams, for Cub
- Runner-up: Jacob Burgess Rollo, for Minor Sporting Achievements

From 2016 to 2022, four poets were accepted for publication, which number reduced to two beginning in 2023, and two runners-up have also been announced every year since (except in 2025). The Poetry Business's digital residencies, or the 'Poet in Residence' programme, has included New Poets Prize winners Jenny Danes, Hannah Hodgson, Chloe Elliott, and more. Kashyap is the only India-based winner of the Prize. He was shortlisted for the Prize twice, in 2021 and 2022. The competition wasn't announced in 2024. Zelda Cahill-Patten, who was one of the runners-up in the 2023/23 Prize went on to win the 2025/26 Prize.

=== The International Book & Pamphlet Competition ===
Established in 1986, the International Book & Pamphlet Competition is an older competition, and hailed as "the first of its kind in Britain." It's notable winners have been Peter Daniels and Moniza Alvi in 1991, published together as Peacock Luggage in 1992, Dean Browne in 2021 for Kitchens at Night, Michael Laskey in 1988 for Cloves of Garlic, and Daljit Nagra in 2003 for Oh My Rub! In 2025, which was the competition's 39th year, it was judged by the poet Kim Moore, who had also judged the New Poets Prize earlier.

Below is an incomplete list of poets who have won the Competition over the years^{α}:

==== Before 2002/03 ====
- 1988: Michael Laskey, for Cloves of Garlic
- 1989: Mimi Khalvati, for Persian Miniatures^{β}
- 1989: David Morley, for A Belfast Kiss^{β}
- 1990: Liz Cashdan, for Troublesome Cattle^{γ}
- 1990: Julia Casterton, for Troublesome Cattle^{γ}
- 1991: Moniza Alvi, for Peacock Luggage^{δ}
- 1991: Peter Daniels, for Peacock Luggage^{δ}
- 1993/94: Bob Cooper, for Light From The Upper Left^{ε}
- 1993: Jo Haslam, for Light From The Upper Left^{ε}
- 1994: Katherine Frost, for The Sixth Channel
- 1994: Selima Hill, for My Sister's Horse
- 1994: Mandy Sutter, for Game
- 1995: Stephen Knight, for The Sandfields Baudelaire
- 1996: Jane Draycott, for No Theatre
- 1996: Diana Syder, for Hubble
- 1997: Marlynn Rosario, for Larvae
- 1998: Kath McKay, for Anyone Left Standing
- 1998: Stephanie Norgate, for Fireclay
- 1998: Susan Utting, for Something Small is Missing
- 1998: Cliff Yates, for Henry's Clock
- 1999: Peter Daniels, for Through The Brushes
- 1999: Brenda Lealman, for Time You Left
- 2000: Dennis Casling, for Endorphin Angels
- 2000: Bob Cooper, for Pinocchio's Long Neb
- 2000: Robert Hamberger, for The Rule of Earth
- 2000: Catherine Smith, for The New Bride
- 2000: Tim Dooley, for The Secret Ministry
- 2001: Anne-marie Austin, for Debatable Land
- 2001: Jennifer Copley, for Ice

==== 2002/03 (Judge: David Constantine) ====
- Peter Bennet, for Ha-Ha
- Chris Jones, for Hard on the Knuckle
- Tim Liardet, for The Uses of Pepper
- Daljit Nagra, for Oh My Rub!
- Jane Routh, for Circumnavigation

==== 2003/04 (Judge: Gillian Clarke) ====
- Mike Barlow, for Living on the Difference
- Tim Dooley, for Tenderness
- Stephen Duncan, for Ghost-Walking
- Sam Gardiner, for The Picture Never Taken
- Kathryn Simmonds, for Snug

==== 2004/05 (Judge: Gerard Benson) ====
- Patricia Debney, for How to Be a Dragonfly
- Carole Bromley, for Unscheduled Halt
- Hugh McMillan, for After the Storm
- Hilary Menos, for Extra Maths
- Pascale Petit, for The Wounded Deer

==== 2005/06 (Judge: Simon Armitage) ====
- Paul Batchelor, for To Photograph a Snow Crystal
- Ed Reiss, for Now Then
- Padraig Rooney, for The Escape Artist
- Pam Thompson, for Show Date and Time

==== 2006/07 (Judge: Vicki Feaver) ====
- Andrea Holland, for Borrowed
- Judith Lal, for Flageolets at the Bazaar
- Patrick McGuinness, for 19th Century Blues
- Allison McVety, for The Night Trotsky Came to Stay

==== 2007/08 (Judge: Alison Brackenbury) ====
- Julia Deakin, for The Half-mile High Club
- Yvonne Green, for Boukhara
- Padraig O'Morain, for You've been Great
- Ann Pilling, for Growing Pains

==== 2008/09 (Judge: Michael Longley) ====
- Carole Bromley, for Skylight
- Sally Goldsmith, for Singer
- Michael McCarthy, for At the Races
- Anna Woodford, for Party Piece

==== 2009/10 (Judge: Andrew Motion) ====
- Jane Aspinall, for American Shadow
- Nina Boyd, for Dear Mr Asquith
- Sue Boyle, for Too Late for the Love Hotel
- Alan Payne, for Exploring the Orinoco

==== 2010/11 (Judge: Simon Armitage) ====
- Paul Bentley, for Largo
- Christy Ducker, for Armour
- Maitreyabandhu, for The Bond
- David Tait, for Love's Loose Ends

==== 2011/12 (Judge: Carol Ann Duffy) ====
- Suzannah Evans, for Confusion Species
- Julie Mellor, for Breathing Through Our Bones
- Kim Moore, for If We Could Speak Like Wolves
- Rosie Shepperd, for That So-Easy Thing

==== 2012/13 (Judge: Simon Armitage) ====
- David Attwooll, for Surfacing
- Emma Danes, for Dress of Shadows
- David Grubb, for Ways of Looking
- Kim Lasky, for Petrol, Cyan, Electric

==== 2013/14 (Judge: Carol Ann Duffy) ====
- James Caruth, for The Death of Narrative
- Rebecca Farmer, for Not Really
- Holly Hopkins, for Soon Every House Will Have One
- Ben Wilkinson, for For Real

==== 2014/15 (Judge: Billy Collins) ====
- Basil du Toit, for Old
- Paul Stephenson, for Those People
- David Tait, for Three Dragon Day
- Luke Samuel Yates, for The Flemish Primitives

==== 2015/16 (Judge: Billy Collins) ====
- Stephanie Conn, for Copeland's Daughter
- John Foggin, for Much Possessed
- John Eppel, for Landlocked
- Mary King, for Homing

==== 2016/17 (Judges: Ian Duhig & Mimi Khalvati) ====
Sources:

- Josephine Abbot, for The Infinite Knot
- Katy Evans-Bush, for Broken Cities
- Ruth McIlroy, for Guppy Primer
- Lesley Saunders, for Angels on Horseback

==== 2017/18 (Judges: Liz Berry & David Constantine) ====
- Rebecca Cullen, for Majid Sits in a Tree and Sings
- Ann Gray, for I Wish I Had More Mothers
- Christopher North, for The Topiary of Passchendaele
- Madeleine Wurzburger, for Sleeve Catching Fire at Dawn

==== 2018/19 (Judges: Neil Astley, Michael Schmidt & Amy Wack) ====
- Suji Kwock Kim, for Notes from the North
- Hilary Menos, for Human Tissue
- Nick On, for Zhou
- Emma Simon, for The Odds

==== 2019/20 (Judges: Imtiaz Dharker & Ian McMillan) ====
- Rosalind Easton, for Black Mascara (Waterproof)
- Jill Penny, for In Your Absence
- Wendy Pratt, for When I Think of My Body as a Horse
- Sarah Wimbush, for The Last Dinosaur in Doncaster

==== 2020/21 (Judges: Pascale Petit & Daljit Nagra) ====
Sources:

- Dean Browne, for Kitchens at Night
- Jim McElroy, for We Are The Weather
- Maya C Popa, for Dear Life
- Anastasia Taylor-Lind, for One Language

==== 2021/22 (Judges: Jonathan Edwards & Romalyn Ante) ====
- Karen Downs-Barton, for Didicoy
- Jon Miller, for Past Tense Future Imperfect
- Zoë Walkington, for I Hate to Be the One to Tell You This
- Luke Samuel Yates, for The Mystery Shopper

==== 2022/23 (Judge: Hannah Lowe) ====
- Laurie Bolger, for Spin
- Doreen Gurrey, for A Coalition of Cheetahs

==== 2023/24 (Judge: Jane Clarke) ====
Sources:

- Caroline Bracken, for Boy, Mother
- Jen Feroze, for A Dress With Deep Pockets

==== 2024/25 (Judge: Kim Moore) ====
Sources:

- Ian Harker, for Gain Access
- Annina Zheng-Hardy, for Abeyance

==== 2025/26 (Judge: Kim Moore) ====
- Derval Tubridy, for I Will Say That
- Tom Weir, for Negativity Bias

Luke Samuel Yates, a four times Poetry Society Foyle Young Poet and lecturer in Sociology, is one of the seven entrants who have won the Competition twice. He won it most recently, in 2015 and 2022. The first was Peter Daniels, to win in 1991 and 1999. The others are Bob Cooper, who won in 1993 and 2000, Time Dooley, who won in 2001 and 2005, Carole Bromley, in 2005 and 2009, Hilary Menos, in 2005 and 2019, and David Tait, who did in 2011 and 2015.

== History ==
An almost four-decade old firm, they're now "one of the most respected in publishing." They began publishing when Peter Sansom was still a research assistant at the then Huddersfield Polytechnic, and for over 20 years, Peter Sansom and Janet Fisher served as The Poetry Business's co-directors. After Fisher's retirement, Ann Sansom took over as co-director as the team were first moving to Sheffield.

In the past, from 2017-2023, they had the poet Suzannah Evans as assistant editor working on their New Poets List. Evans published her first pamphlet in 2012, after winning the Poetry Business pamphlet competition, judged by Carol Ann Duffy that year. The current assistant editor, at The Poetry Business and The North, is the poet Holly Hopkins, who won the 2014 Poetry Business Pamphlet Competition and the Poetry Book Society Pamphlet Choice for her debut pamphlet, Soon Every House Will Have One.

In 2019, an unsuccessful Arts Council grant bid caused a funding crisis, putting the firm in jeopardy. The year otherwise had been one of great success, considering increased book and magazine sales, and a thriving teaching programme. McLeod has mentioned that "the absence of regular funding brings continuing challenges" in the field. Earlier, in 2008/2009, losing grant funding from the Council had led them to move from Huddersfield, where the outfit was based in a Victorian arcade for 20 years, to Sheffield. They first moved to Bank Street Arts, and are now based in Campo Lane. The Poetry Business has relied on two-year Arts Council grants, and was saved in 2019 by crowdfunding from 380 supporters. The appeal attracted donations of £19,047 against the amount of £14,000, required to cover the cost of the press's planned work.

== Further recognition ==
Poets first published by the press have gone on to win major awards. Both Carol Ann Duffy and Simon Armitage, respectively from 2009-2019 and 2019-present, have served as the Poet Laureates of the UK. Armitage and Mimi Khalvati have won the King's/Queen's Gold Medal for Poetry in 2018 and 2023, respectively. Khalvati founded the Poetry School in 1997 with poets Jane Duran and Pascale Petit. Selima Hill, while not first published by the press, also won the Gold Medal in 2022. David Morley, whose A Belfast Kiss was published in 1991, received the 2015 Ted Hughes Award for New Poetry. The Ted Hughes Award in itself was a project which ran alongside Carol Ann Duffy's tenure as Poet Laureate. Launched the same year as the press, one of the poets to propose Poems on the Underground was Gerard Benson, who went on to publish work with The Poetry Business. Mike Barlow, who published his first collection, Living on the Difference, with the press, won the 2006 National Poetry Competition, and was commended in 2022. Allison McVety, who published her debut with the Press in 2007, won the 2011 National Poetry Competition for her poem 'To the Lighthouse'. In 2009, Paul Batchelor won the Edwin Morgan International Poetry Competition for his poem 'Comeuppance'.

Jane Draycott's 1996 Competition-winning No Theatre was on the shortlist for the 1997 Forward Prize for Best First Collection. Cliff Yates's 1998 Competition-winning Henry's Clock was awarded the 1999 Aldeburgh/Jerwood Best First Collection Prize, which Mike Barlow's Living on the Difference was later shortlisted for. Dennis Casling's Endorphin Angels was a Poetry Book Society Recommendation. Kim Moore was shortlisted for the Forward Prize for Best Poem in 2015, and won the 2016 Geoffrey Faber Memorial Prize for her debut The Art of Falling (Seren, 2015). She later served as a judge for the 2018 National Poetry Competition and the 2020 Forward Prizes. Moore's work has been translated into many languages as part of the Versopolis project, and she won the 2022 Forward Prize for Best Collection for All The Men I Never Married (Seren, 2021). In 2003, Jane Routh's Circumnavigation was shortlisted for the Forward First Collection Prize, and Allison McVety's The Night Trotsky Came to Stay in 2008. Dominic McLoughlin, who was placed second in the National Poetry Competition 2005, was shortlisted for the Book & Pamphlet Competition the same year. Christy Ducker's Armour was Poetry Book Society Pamphlet Choice for Autumn 2011. Ben Wilkinson's For Real was awarded a Northern Promise Award at the 2014 Northern Writers' Awards. Imogen Wade, who won the National Poetry Competition 2023 for her poem 'The Time I Was Mugged in New York City', was a runner-up in that year's New Poets Prize. The actor Kate Rutter was highly commended in the 2021 Competition, and a runner-up in 2024. One of the 2021 New Poets Prize winners, Charlotte Shevchenko Knight, published her Eric Gregory Award-winning debut collection Food for the Dead with Jonathan Cape in 2024. The collection was shortlisted for the Felix Dennis Prize for Best First Collection the same year, and won the Best First Collection UK at the Laurel Prize 2024. Knight was awarded the Somerset Maugham Award in 2025. Jayant Kashyap, who was one of the winners of the 2024 New Poets Prize, won a 2025 Toto Award for Creative Writing (English). Tom Branfoot, a 2022 winner of the Prize, was shortlisted for the 2025 Forward Prize for Best Single Poem (Written) for his poem 'A Parliament of Jets', first published in Ambient Receiver. In 2025, poets Alan Payne and Shash Trevett were shortlisted for the Derek Walcott Prize for their collections Mahogany Eve and The Naming of Names. Jim McElroy's poem 'Coming of Age' was commended in the 2025 National Poetry Competition.

Sir Andrew Motion, the UK Poet Laureate from 1999-2009, described the press as "one of the most vital and vitalising literary organisations in the country". Dame Duffy has said that "The Poetry Business is undoubtedly among the most important initiatives in UK literature, bar none". On how the press works, director Ann Sansom noted in a June 2025 interview that they work "together – underfunded but enjoying what we do".

== Notes ==
1.^αSeveral winners of the International Book & Pamphlet Competition have not been mentioned here because of a lack of availability of reliable data. Same for any information about the judges during the said years.
2.^βKhalvati was a co-winner of the 1989 Competition with David Morley, and their respective collections Persian Miniatures and A Belfast Kiss were published as one book.
3.^γTroublesome Cattle is the work of Liz Cashdan and Julia Casterton, joint winners of the Poetry Business Competition 1990.
4.^δPeacock Luggage was a double pamphlet, comprising the Book & Pamphlet Competition winning collections of Moniza Alvi and Peter Daniels.
5.^εLight From the Upper Left included work from Bob Cooper and Jo Haslam, who were joint winners in The Poetry Business Competition 1993.
