= Laura Potts =

English poet and writer (born 1996)

- Born: Laura Iréna Potts; 16 February 1996 (age 30); Wakefield, England
- Occupation: Poet
- Writing career
- Language: English
- Genre: Poetry
- Notable works: 'The Night that Robin Died'; Sweet the Morning Dew
- Notable awards: Foyle Young Poets of the Year Award, 2012 & 2013; The Maria Edgeworth Prize for Poetry in Ireland, 2018
- Website: laurapottspoetry.com

Laura Potts (born 16 February 1996) is a poet and writer of radio drama from Wakefield, England. Commended for the Foyle Young Poets of the Year Award in 2012 and 2013, she was shortlisted in the Oxford Brookes International Poetry Competition 2017, the 2020 Manchester Writing Competition, and the Bridport Prize 2020 and 2021.

== Early life ==
Potts was born and brought up in Wakefield, West Yorkshire, where she lived as of 2023. She initially studied English literature at the University of York, but left the course in 2016 "to write literature rather than write about it".

== Career ==
Potts work mostly looks at "the restless topography of Yorkshire." Her work was featured in Acumen, Southword, Agenda, The Moth, Poetry Ireland Review and Poetry Salzburg Review, and was nominated for a Pushcart Prize. She noted Dylan Thomas as an early influence; her grandmother moved Potts towards poetry. Potts read her poetry at the Wakefield Literature Festival, at Leeds University, BBC's Contains Strong Language Festival, and at Ilkley Literature Festival.

Early in her career, in 2012 and 2013, Potts was recognised by The Poetry Society. She was commended in the society's Foyle Young Poets of the Year Award for poets under 17. Her work was shortlisted for the Oxford Brookes International Poetry Competition and the Manchester Writing Competition. Mimi Khalvati, a judge in the Manchester competition, praised "above all the musicality" of Potts's work. In 2013, Potts became an Arts Council Northern Voices poet, and was chosen as a Lieder Poet at the University of Leeds in 2014. In 2016, she worked at the Dylan Thomas Society's Birthplace Museum in Swansea, Wales.

Potts's radio drama Sweet the Morning Dew, looking at "people living with wartime loss in the north of England", aired on BBC Radio 3 at Christmas in 2017. This was part of The Verb New Voices scheme, a collaboration between four English organisations: BBC Radio 3, New Writing North, The Writing Squad and Arvon. Potts later won the Mother’s Milk Books Writing Prize 2017, and was commended in the Gregory O'Donoghue Prize in 2018. In 2019, she was commended for the Battered Moons Poetry Competition, and highly commended for the Edward Thomas Fellowship in 2020. Also in 2020, she was shortlisted for the Rebecca Swift Foundation's Women Poets' Prize 2020 (judged by Malika Booker, Pascale Petit and Liz Berry), alongside Alisha Dietzman, Cecilia Knapp and Warda Yassin. In 2020 and 2021, she was also shortlisted for the Bridport Prize.

In 2023, one of Potts's poems, 'Field Song', which was "written especially for the site", was engraved at City Fields in West Yorkshire. This was alongside two new pieces of art also installed at the site. The poem is engraved into "impressive stone pieces" by the local stonemasons from Rayner Memorials in Normanton, West Yorkshire. In 2024, her work was anthologised in Five: a poetry anthology, published by The Poetry Business as part of their New Poets List, alongside poems by four other poets: Helen Bowell, Prerana Kumar, Eva Lewis and Ruth Yates.

Potts, who was also on the Torbay Poetry Festival's Open Poetry Competition long list, is currently "working on [her] first collection" of poems.

== Awards and honours ==
- 2012: Commended, Foyle Young Poets of the Year Award
- 2013: Commended, Foyle Young Poets of the Year Award
- 2017: Shortlisted, Oxford Brookes International Poetry Competition
- 2018: Mother’s Milk Books Writing Prize 2017
- 2018: 3rd place, Bristol Poetry Prize
- 2018: The Maria Edgeworth Prize for Poetry in Ireland
- 2020: Shortlisted, Bridport Prize
- 2020: Shortlisted, Manchester Writing Competition
- 2021: Shortlisted, Bridport Prize
