= Tom Branfoot =

British poet and critic

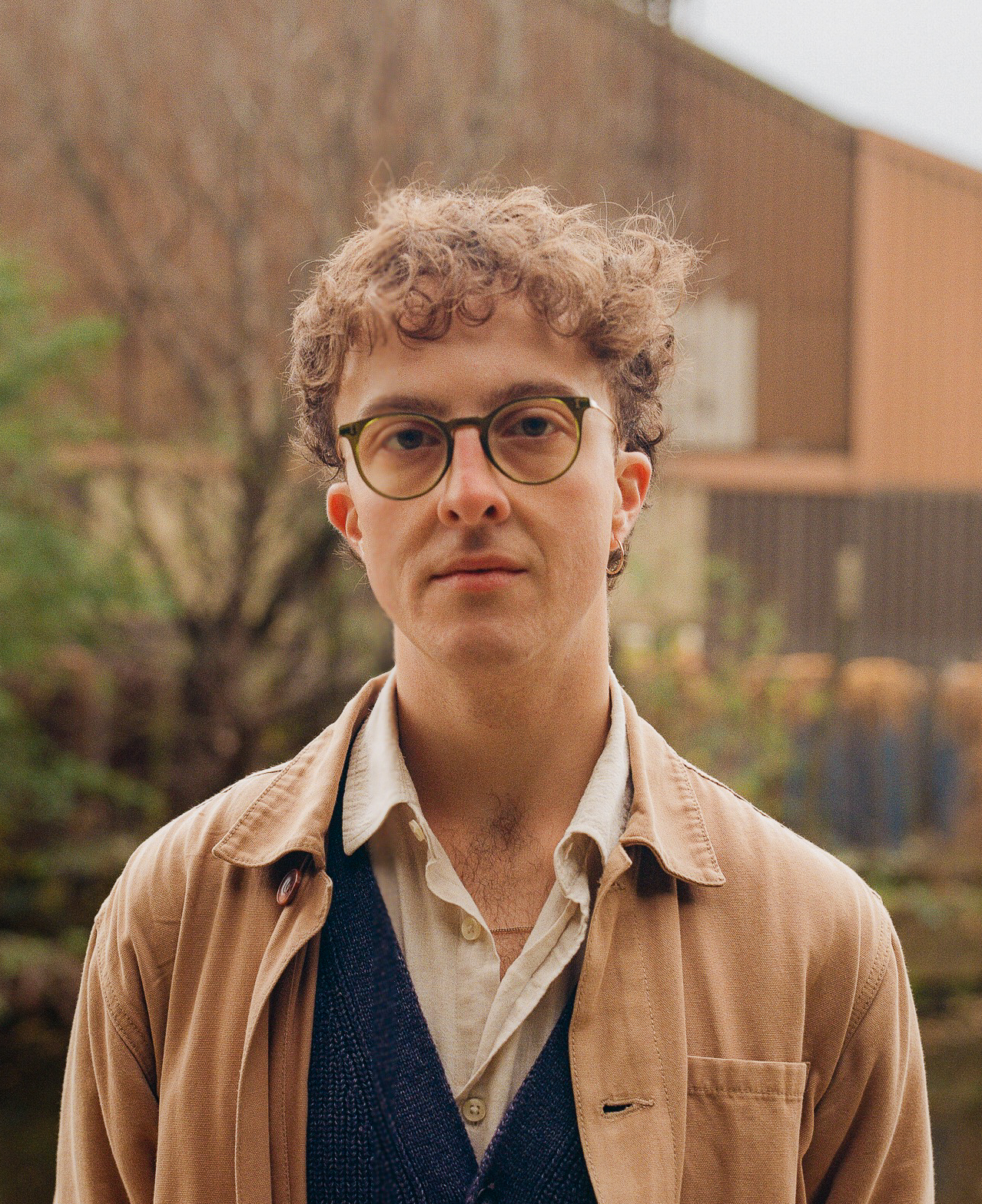
- Branfoot in 2024
- Born: West Yorkshire, England
- Education: BA (Hons), 2021; MA, 2022
- Alma mater: Manchester Metropolitan University; University College London
- Occupations: Poet, critic
- Writing career
- Language: English
- Genres: Poetry; Criticism
- Notable works: This Is Not an Epiphany boar
- Notable awards: The Poetry Business New Poets Prize 2022; Northern Debut Award for Poetry in 2024

Tom Branfoot is a poet and critic from Bradford, England. His pamphlet This Is Not an Epiphany earned him the 2022 Poetry Business New Poets Prize. Branfoot is currently the writer-in-residence at the Manchester Cathedral, and was awarded a Northern Debut Award for Poetry in 2024.

== Life and education ==
Branfoot is an English poet from Bradford. He has a BA (Hons) in English and American Literature from the Manchester Writing School at Manchester Metropolitan University, awarded in 2021. He later studied for an MA in Issues in Modern Culture at UCL.

In 2020, he expressed disagreement on X (then Twitter) about the name of Manchester-based The Hollow Cow Hotel's bar, which was called 'Plantation Bar' at that time. After the phrase "colonial vibes" was questioned, the hotel apologised for "an ill-advised choice of naming" the bar.

== Career ==
Branfoot is a widely published poet, with work, including book reviews, appearing in such journals as The Poetry Review, Magma, Washington Square Review, The London Magazine, berlin lit and bath magg. For Magma, he has reviewed work by poets Hannah Sullivan (Was It for This, Faber, 2022), Jacob Polley (Material Properties, Picador, 2023) and Degna Stone (Proof of Life on Earth, Nine Arches Press, 2022), work by poets Ali Lewis, Martin Figura and Caroline Bird, and by Edwina Attlee and Joyelle McSweeney for The Poetry Review. For The London Magazine, he has written about John Burnside, whose "death was particularly unexpected".

In 2020, he was highly commended in the "Twitter-based" Creative Manchester Poetry Competition, judged by the poets Lemn Sissay, John McAuliffe and Maryam Hessavi.

Called one of "Manchester's finest young poets", his debut pamphlet, I'll Splinter, was published by Pariah Press as part of their Infernal Editions series in 2021. In 2022, he was awarded the Poetry Business New Poets Prize for his second pamphlet This Is Not an Epiphany, selected by Anthony Anaxagorou. It was published in 2023, and was followed by Branfoot's third, boar, from Broken Sleep Books.

He was praised for a "sharp eye" in a review of I'll Splinter, noting that he could notice "the poetic in the pebbledash and tarmac of the in-between places." Green says that Branfoot writes about "all fathers", and deftly mingles "the epic and the everyday". This Is Not an Epiphany was one of the Broken Sleep authors' book of the year 2023. The poet Charlie Baylis called it full of "[s]parkle and heartbeat". Nathaniel King included Branfoot's boar in his best books of the year. In a review, boar has been noted as "an exercise in poetic exploration". Writing for The Mancunion, Phedra Broch called Branfoot's pieces "real and raw" in their approach and expression. In a 2024 article, KLOF Mag looked at another Bradford artist Dean McPhee's track "The Bradford Boar" as a companion piece to Branfoot's boar. In a 2025 review of boar published in Wild Court, Kevin Gardner called it "a sequence comprising fragments of local history, the Bradford boar legend", and called Branfoot as "not merely recovering forgotten history but finding the universal human truths buried in local legend." Gardner also noted that the prosaic lines appear as "strictly visual [poetry] in the layout" which refuse to let "the violent slaughter of the beast to remain a legend cushioned by its medieval remoteness."

At present, Branfoot holds the position of the writer-in-residence at Manchester Cathedral. As part of this residency at the cathedral, a position he took up in 2023, Branfoot has organised several events, including the Manchester Cathedral Poetry Competition, judged by Rogers Govender, poets Ella Duffy and Emily Oldfield, and himself, and a series of workshops titled "Doubt Wisely" over six weeks in May and June 2023. With poet Andrew McMillan, he also organised a ‘Christianity in Poetry' event featuring poets Camille Ralphs, Michael Symmons Roberts and Malika Booker.

In 2023, Branfoot founded the poetry reading series More Song, running out of the Record Café in Bradford on a monthly basis. The series has hosted acclaimed poets as well as poets of growing fame like Zaffar Kunial, Fran Lock, and Hannah Copley, nominee for the 2024 T. S. Eliot Prize. More Song has also collaborated with publishers such as Pavilion Poetry, And Other Stories and The 87 Press.

In 2024, he was awarded a Northern Debut Award for Poetry, for his collection on "crisis, birdwatching, class, environment, and dwelling" revolving around West Yorkshire landscapes. The book is tentatively titled Volatile. He was also highly commended in the Solstice Nature Prize for Young Writers 2024, for his poem 'Box', praised by the judge, Gill Lewis, for a powerful imagery.

In 2025, he was one of the StAnza artists. Branfoot was also shortlisted for the Forward Prize for Best Single Poem (Written) for 'A Parliament of Jets', first published in Ambient Receiver. As part of his residency at the Manchester Cathedral, he wrote a poem "considering the contemporary resonances of" the Peterloo massacre of 1819.

His debut collection, titled Volatile, is forthcoming from the87press.

== Pamphlets ==
- I'll Splinter (Pariah Press, 2021) ISBN 9780993037856
- This Is Not an Epiphany (New Poets List, 2023) ISBN 9781914914508
- boar (Broken Sleep Books, 2023) ISBN 9781915760272

== Awards ==
- 2020: Highly Commended, Creative Manchester Poetry Competition
- 2022: The Poetry Business New Poets Prize, for This Is Not an Epiphany
- 2024: Northern Debut Award for Poetry
- 2024: Highly Commended, The Solstice Nature Prize for Young Writers, for 'Box'
