= Imogen Wade =

English poet (born 1998)

- Born: 1998 (age 27–28)
- Education: University of Exeter BA, University of Plymouth
- Occupations: Poet, Therapist
- Writing career
- Language: English
- Notable works: Girl, Swooning, 'The Time I Was Mugged in New York City'
- Notable awards: National Poetry Competition 2023, Troubadour International Poetry Prize 2024
- Website: imogenwadepoetry.co.uk

Imogen Wade (born 1998) is an English poet from Harlow. She won the National Poetry Competition 2023 for her poem 'The Time I Was Mugged in New York City', and the Troubadour International Poetry Prize 2024 for 'Poem About Love'.

== Life and education ==
Wade grew up in Harlow, Essex, and went on to study English Literature at the University of Exeter, with a year abroad at Vassar College, New York.

Wade later trained in person-centred therapy at the University of Plymouth, and is now a practising therapist.

== Writing ==
Wade began publishing from an early age, winning a commendation for a poem at the Foyle Young Poets of Year Award in 2015, judged by Liz Berry. Ever since, she has won several accolades, having been named a Runner-Up in The Poetry Business's 2023 New Poets Prize for her pamphlet manuscript Fire Safety, selected by the poet Kim Moore, and commended in the 2024 Moth Poetry Prize. In 2024, Wade was a finalist in the Montreal Prize for her poem 'Argos'. She was also named first prize winner in the Ware Poets Open Competition 2023, and her poems have appeared in The Poetry Review, PN Review, The London Magazine, and elsewhere. Occasionally, Wade has also organised free writing workshops.

In 2024, Wade was named the winner of National Poetry Competition 2023 for her poem 'The Time I Was Mugged in New York City', selected by the poets Jane Draycott, Will Harris and Clare Pollard. The poem was praised for the description of "an ugly incident in strangely beautiful detail". This win got her considerable attention, with The Spectator blaming the organisation behind the competition, The Poetry Society, for having "betrayed poetry". In a blog post, poet Courtenay Schembri Gray found the poem "woefully unambitious". While The Spectator refuted the idea of Wade's poem being a poem at all, calling it "prose, printed in [a] central [block] on the page," the judges praised the "paradoxical lyricism" of the poem, noting its strength in "skilfully and subtly open[ing] up the psychological complexity of [an] assault". The poet Michael Conley praised the poem for its "tension", and said he was "glad it won a baffling amount of money." Written in response to "a real life experience", 'The Time I Was Mugged in New York City' was one of 19 thousand poems submitted to the competition in 2023. In an interview with the BBC, Wade noted that she was "very surpris[ed]" on receiving the news of the win, pointing out that she might now "by a domino effect" have profited "from the mugging".

In 2024, Wade was also named the winner of the Troubadour International Poetry Prize 2024, selected by poets Jane Yeh and Glyn Maxwell, for her poem titled 'Poem About Love'. Yeh praised the work for its "sophisticated voice and compelling lines", and Maxwell called it "a heartfelt revelation of a poem".

In October 2024, she was awarded a DYCP Grant from Arts Council England for A Poet's First Novel, and was later longlisted in the National Poetry Competition 2024.

Wade's debut poetry collection Girl, Swooning is a book "dedicated to mothers", and was published in March 2026 by Corsair, a Little, Brown Book Group imprint. The poet Kim Moore said that Wade "knows exactly what she is doing with the handling of line from poem to poem". The Madrid Review praised the collection for "a distinctive blend of lyrical intensity, philosophical reflection and emotional candour." Jayant Kashyap called it "a book of elegies [...] also for the living".

== Books ==
- Girl, Swooning (Corsair, 2026) ISBN 9781472160386

== Awards ==
- 2015: Commended, Foyle Young Poets of Year
- 2023: First Prize, Ware Poets Open Competition 2023
- 2023: Runner Up, The Poetry Business New Poets Prize, for Fire Safety
- 2023: Shortlisted, Plough Poetry Prize, for 'Tennis Lesson'
- 2024: Commended, Moth Poetry Prize
- 2024: National Poetry Competition 2023, for 'The Time I Was Mugged in New York City'
- 2024: Finalist, Montreal International Poetry Prize, for 'Argos'
- 2024: Troubadour International Poetry Prize
- 2025: Longlisted, National Poetry Competition 2024
