= TGM =

TGM may refer to:

== People ==
- Tomáš Garrigue Masaryk (1850–1937), first President of Czechoslovakia
- Gáspár Miklós Tamás (1948–2023), Hungarian: Tamás Gáspár Miklós), Hungarian philosopher

== Organizations ==
- Târgu Mureș International Airport, IATA airport code in Romania
- Tellings-Golden Miller, UK bus company
- Tunis-Goulette-Marsa, a railway line in Tunisia
- TGM Grand Prix, a Japanese auto racing team
- The Games Machine, a former video game magazine
  - The Games Machine (Italy), another video game magazine that is still running

== Other ==
- Taipei Grand Mosque, a mosque in Taipei, Taiwan
- TGM is the station code for Teignmouth railway station
- Tetris: The Grand Master, a video game series
- Tom Pendlebury's TGM system, a System of measurement in Duodecimal
- Top Gun: Maverick, a 2022 action drama film
- Total gaseous mercury, a measurement of mercury concentration used in toxicology research
- Transglutaminase, an enzyme
