= Lauren Hollingsworth-Smith =

Rotherham and Oxford-based English poet and artist (born 2001)

- Born: 2001 (age 24–25); Rotherham, England
- Education: University of Oxford
- Occupations: Poet; Artist
- Writing career
- Language: English
- Genre: Poetry
- Notable works: Ugly Bird; Look How Alive
- Notable awards: Foyle Young Poets of the Year Award, 2019; The Poetry Business New Poets Prize, 2020
- Website: laurenhollingsworthsmith.wordpress

Lauren Hollingsworth-Smith (born 2001), also sometimes referred to as Lauren Hollingsworth Smith, is an English poet and artist from Rotherham. She was a top 15 winner of the Poetry Society's Foyle Young Poets of the Year Award 2019, and a winner of the Poetry Business New Poets Prize in 2020 for her pamphlet manuscript titled Ugly Bird. She published her debut poetry collection, Look How Alive, with Write Bloody UK in 2022. Hollingsworth-Smith is a student of English and French at the University of Oxford.

== Work ==
Hollingsworth-Smith, who is from Rotherham, South Yorkshire, was received widely as a poet after being highly commended for New Writing North's Young Northern Writer Award in 2019. Following which, she was placed as one of the fifteen winners of the Foyle Young Poets of the Year Award 2019 for her poem 'I want to stand naked in the school hall', selected by the poets Jackie Kay and Raymond Antrobus. After winning the prize at age 17, she went on to win the Poetry Business New Poets Prize for her pamphlet manuscript, titled Ugly Bird, in 2020. The prize was judged by the poet Luke Kennard who noted her poems were "immediately and joyfully readable even at their darkest".

At the time of the New Poets Prize win, Hollingsworth-Smith was waiting to "accept her place at Oxford" to study English and French. After the publication of Ugly Bird in 2021, she published her debut full-length collection, Look How Alive, with Write Bloody UK in 2022. The collection which was published following a contact made by the publisher on the social media platform 'X' (formerly Twitter) has most poems written after Hollingsworth-Smith rusticated from Lady Margaret Hall, Oxford and went to France working as a cleaner and au-pair. Look How Alive includes her own illustrations.

In 2022, she also had her work anthologised in Pan Macmillan's anthology of poetry by women, titled She Will Soar, and edited by Ana Sampson. In July 2023, she collaborated with the Indian poet Jayant Kashyap, who won the New Poets Prize in 2024. The result, a poem titled 'worm', was published in Honey Literary's eighth issue in 2024. Hollingsworth-Smith has also performed her poems at a number of events, including at Ted Hughes Festival, Ledbury Poetry Festival, Kendal Poetry Festival and Off the Shelf Festival of Words, and participated in several workshops run by the poet Warda Yassin, as part of a project titled "Canal Works". Both Yassin and Hollingsworth-Smith are mentees of the poet Vicky Morris.

Hollingsworth-Smith collaborated with Kashyap again in 2026, and the pair were longlisted in Dialect Press's inaugural DIRT Plantable Poetry Competition.

== Reviews ==
Writing for New Writing North, Will Mackie found the poems in Ugly Bird to be "full of tenderness, humour and precise observation." In another review, Anne Bailey pointed out that the first poem in the pamphlet – also the Foyle Award-winning poem – is a "very dramatic beginning to a pamphlet that is full of energy." Vic Pickup called Hollingsworth-Smith "a bright star in the next generation of poets." Kashyap, in a short review, praised the pamphlet for "the poet's boldness", focussing on the inclusion of both personal and "less/im-personal" poems, and noting that Hollingsworth-Smith "is not as hung on trying to make it look beautiful as she is on making it make sense".

== Books ==
- Ugly Bird (Smith/Doorstop, 2020) ISBN 9781912196586
- Look How Alive (Write Bloody UK, 2022) ISBN 9781838033255

== Awards ==
- 2019: Highly Commended, Northern Writers Award
- 2019: Foyle Young Poets of the Year Award.
- 2020: The Poetry Business New Poets Prize
- 2026: Longlisted, with Jayant Kashyap, DIRT Plantable Poetry Competition
