= Holly Hopkins =

English poet and editor

- Born: Berkshire, England
- Education: University of Warwick; Royal Holloway, London (MA Creative Writing, 2013)
- Occupations: Poet, editor
- Writing career
- Language: English
- Genre: Poetry
- Notable work: The English Summer
- Notable awards: Eric Gregory Award 2011; The Poetry Business Pamphlet Competition 2013/14
- Website: hollyhopkins.co.uk

Holly Hopkins is a Manchester-based poet and editor. She has published a poetry pamphlet, Soon Every House Will Have One (Smith/Doorstop, 2014), and a poetry collection, The English Summer (Penned in the Margins, 2022). The former was a Poetry Book Society Pamphlet Choice, and the latter won a Poetry Book Society Special Commendation.

== Early life ==
Hopkins grew up in Berkshire and London, and later moved to Manchester. She has a bachelor's degree from the University of Warwick, and in 2013, was awarded an MA in Creative Writing from the Royal Holloway, University of London.

== Work ==
Hopkins's verse was noticed at the turn of the century, and she was selected as a Poetry Society Young Poet of the Year in 1999 and 2000. In 2011, "with the help of some initial funding from Arts Council England's Poetry & Young People Project", she helped set up the Young Poets Network arm of the society, which now focusses on supporting poets "up to the age of 25". She also won the Eric Gregory Award in 2011, and went on to have her work included in Sidekick Press, Seren Books and Bloodaxe Books anthologies, and published in The Guardian, The Telegraph and the TLS. She has performed her work at a number of festivals, including the Ledbury and the Aldeburgh poetry festivals, and at the Royal Festival Hall.

Hopkins won the 2013/14 Poetry Business International Book & Pamphlet Competition, judged by Carol Ann Duffy. Her pamphlet, titled Soon Every House Will Have One, which was published in 2014, was praised in Poetry London for a voice "so fresh it virtually sizzles". In the review, the poet Clare Pollard also noted that Hopkins's was "an almost flawless pamphlet performance", calling it "a ferociously impressive debut". The Poetry Book Society also declared it as a PBS Pamphlet Choice in 2014.

In 2015, she was an assistant editor of The Rialto, a position she now holds at The Poetry Business, and also managed the Forward Prizes for Poetry. In 2016, she went on to win a Hawthornden Fellowship, and was shortlisted for the inaugural Women Poets' Prize, judged by Sarah Howe, Moniza Alvi, and Fiona Sampson, and organised by the Rebecca Swift Foundation, in 2018.

Published in 2022, her debut collection The English Summer was shortlisted for the Forward and the Seamus Heaney first collection prizes in 2022 and 2023, respectively. Writing for the Dundee Review of the Arts, Orla Davey noted that Hopkins's manner of writing allows "a straightforward matter-of-factness to burn through her narrative". Similar to her pamphlet, The English Summer was the PBS Special Commendation for Summer 2022, and was named one of the best poetry books of 2022 in The Guardian. In 2023, Hopkins won the Third Prize at the Laurel Prize ceremony for the collection. The prize was judged by the poets Pascale Petit and Nick Laird, and the Journalist & Presenter Reeta Chakrabarti.

Hopkins won a Northern Writers' Award in 2023 for a work-in-progress, which will form her second collection. In 2025, she joined as the Awards Administrator for the Michael Marks Awards for Poetry Pamphlets.

== Books ==
- Soon Every House Will Have One (Smith/Doorstop, 2014), ISBN 9781902382098
- The English Summer (Penned in the Margins, 2022), ISBN 9781908058942

== Awards and honors ==
In 2016, Hopkins received a Hawthornden Fellowship.

Awards for Hopkins's writing
Year	Work	Award	Result	Ref.
2011		Eric Gregory Award	Winner	
2013/14	Soon Every House Will Have One	The Poetry Business International Book & Pamphlet Competition	Winner	
2018		Women Poets' Prize	Shortlist	
2022	The English Summer	Forward Prize for Best First Collection	Shortlist	
2023	The English Summer	Seamus Heaney Poetry Prize for a First Collection	Shortlist	
2023	The English Summer	Laurel Prize	Third	
2023		Northern Writers' Award		
