= Kim Moore (poet) =

British poet and lecturer in creative writing (born 1981)

- Born: 1981 (age 44–45); Leicester, England
- Education: PhD, 2020
- Alma mater: Manchester Metropolitan University
- Occupations: Poet, lecturer
- Writing career
- Language: English
- Genres: Poetry; Non-fiction
- Notable awards: Eric Gregory Award 2011; Forward Prize for Best Collection 2022
- Website: www.kimmoorepoet.co.uk

Kim Moore (born 1981) is an English poet from Leicester who lives and works in West Yorkshire. She won an Eric Gregory Award in 2011, and her debut collection The Art of Falling (Seren, 2015) won the Geoffrey Faber Memorial Prize in 2017. Her second collection All the Men I Never Married was awarded the Forward Prize for Best Collection in 2022.

== Life and education ==
Moore, the daughter of a scaffolder and a factory worker, was born in 1981 in Leicester, England. She moved to Barrow, Cumbria in 2004, and now lives in West Yorkshire. She has been a music teacher and a trumpet player, and worked for the Cumbria Music Service as a peripatetic brass teacher. In 2020, she completed her doctorate in "Poetry and Everyday Sexism", assisted by a Vice-Chancellor's Bursary (awarded in 2016), at Manchester Metropolitan University, where she is a Senior Lecturer in Creative Writing.

== Career ==
Moore's poetry has been published in Poetry, Poetry Ireland Review, and Poetry International, in the Forward Prize anthologies, and in several Candlestick Press pamphlets. She has read her poetry widely at the Ledbury Poetry Festival, a commission from whom led to her poem 'For my daughter' during the lockdown. In 2014, she was the Poetry School's third Digital Poet in Residence. Moore was shortlisted for the Forward Prize for Best Poem in 2015, and was a judge of the 2018 National Poetry Competition, along with Kei Miller and Mark Waldron, and of the Forward Prizes in 2020. In 2021, she was one of the featured poets, alongside Raymond Antrobus, Liz Berry, Anthony Anaxagorou, Imtiaz Dharker, Kayo Chingonyi, on Welsh singer Cerys Matthews's album We Come from the Sun. Since 2021, she has judged The Poetry Business prizes, the New Poets Prize and the International Book and Pamphlet Competition, more than once, and she also served as the judge for the 2022 Poets & Players competition. Her work has been translated into many languages as part of the Versopolis project.

Alongside colleague Michael Symmons Roberts, Moore has been noted as one of the poets defining the city of Manchester "through the power of poetry". With Hannah Lowe, she was a guest editor for The Poetry Review's Autumn 2022 issue. In 2023, she was the poet in residence at Trafford General Hospital as part of a project to promote and support health workers in sharing their NHS stories to celebrate the 75th anniversary of the NHS. The project was funded by the Arts and Humanities Research Council led by Manchester Metropolitan University (MMU). With colleagues Frazer Heritage and Sarah Cleave, Moore organised the "16 Days of Activism Against Gender-Based Violence" programme in late 2024 through MMU, where she also talked about her "experience of domestic violence." The festival concluded with poetry readings by Helen Mort and Moore.

=== Collections ===
Moore's first chapbook, If We Could Speak Like Wolves, was a winner in the 2011 Poetry Business Book and Pamphlet Competition, selected by Carol Ann Duffy. It was later shortlisted for both the Michael Marks Awards and the Lakeland Book of the Year in 2011, and was chosen as one of the Independent Books of the Year in 2012. The poet Jennifer Wong wrote about the poems in the pamphlet as marking "the development of a sensitive and bold voice, and hold[ing] as much beauty as unrest."

Moore's debut collection The Art of Falling was published by Seren four years after her Poetry Business Competition win. Tsead Bruinja wrote about the book that it, "like her chapbook, features lots of wolves." About the perceived wolves, he says, they "cry out loud throughout her poems". The Art of Falling won the annual Geoffrey Faber Memorial Prize 2016, selected by Gillian Clarke, Tom Gatti and Katharine Towers. This award, for Moore's collection that "draws from personal experience", was announced at the end of November, in 2017.

Moore's second collection from Seren All the Men I Never Married, published in 2022, went on to win the 2022 Forward Prize for Best Collection. The chair of judges at the award ceremony called the collection "full of dangerous wit and knowing humour". In her review of the collection, Megan Fernandes placed her among the "most compelling [UK] poets", stating that she had "never read a mediocre poem" by Moore. The Times of India placed Moore's All the Men I Never Married alongside Diane Seuss's frank: sonnets on their "Top poetry books of 2022" list. Poet Caroline Bracken, reviewing the book for Nation.Cymru, called it "devastating and devastatingly well written."

Her third collection, titled The House of Broken Things, was published in May 2026 by Corsair, a Little, Brown Book Group imprint. Writing for the Guardian, Kit Fan noted that the "collection constructs an ambitious architecture for exploring intergenerational trauma and motherhood" while exploring "well-trodden territory".

=== Non-fiction ===
What The Trumpet Taught Me, Moore's debut non-fiction book, a "riveting chronological account of practising the trumpet and becoming a trumpeter" made up of short prose pieces, was published by Smith/Doorstop in 2022. A review of this "collection of vivid and immediate snapshots" in the Lancashire Times called it "a Bildungsroman defined by struggle".

Her second non-fiction/hybrid book, titled Are You Judging Me Yet?: Poetry and Everyday Sexism (2023), was noted in New Welsh Review as a book one should read "whether you are a feminist or not".

== Books ==
=== Poetry ===
- If We Could Speak Like Wolves (Smith/Doorstop, 2011) ISBN 9781906613754
- The Art of Falling (Seren, 2015) ISBN 9781781722374
- All the Men I Never Married (Seren, 2022) ISBN 9781781726419
- The House of Broken Things (Corsair, 2026) ISBN 9781472160485

==== As editor ====
- With Kerry Darbishire and Liz Nuttall, This Place I know: A New Anthology of Cumbrian Poetry (Handstand Press, 2018) ISBN 9780957660960
- With Ben Wilkinson and Paul Deaton, The Result Is What You See Today: Poems About Running (Smith/Doorstop, 2019) ISBN 9781912196814
- Ten Poems about Music (Candlestick Press, 2022) ISBN 9781913627119
- Like Flyering For The Revolution (Verve Poetry Press, 2023) ISBN 9781913917272

=== Non-fiction ===
- What the Trumpet Taught Me (Smith/Doorstop, 2022) ISBN 9781914914140

=== Hybrid ===
- Are You Judging Me Yet?: Poetry and Everyday Sexism (Seren, 2023) ISBN 9781781726877

== Awards ==
- 2010: Geoffrey Dearmer Prize
- 2011: Eric Gregory Award
- 2014: Northern Writers' Award, New Writing North
- 2017: Geoffrey Faber Memorial Prize 2016, for The Art of Falling
- 2020: First Prize, Ledbury Poetry Competition, for 'All Night A Bird'
- 2022: Forward Prize for Best Collection, for All the Men I Never Married
