= Acumen =

Acumen may refer to:

- Acumen (organization) (formerly known as Acumen Fund), a non-profit global venture fund
- Acumen (magazine), a triannual British poetry magazine
- Acumen Nation, an American rock music group originally known as Acumen
- Acumen Publishing, a British publisher

== See also ==
- Business acumen
