= Nina Mingya Powles =

New Zealand writer

- Powles in 2020
- Born: 1993 (age 32–33); Wellington, New Zealand
- Education: International Institute of Modern Letters (MA, 2015)
- Occupations: Poet; essayist
- Notable work: Small Bodies of Water (2021)

Nina Mingya Powles (born 1993) is a New Zealand poet and essayist. Born in Wellington, Powles has spent time living in Shanghai and London. Her poetry and essays are inspired by nature and her Chinese-Malaysian heritage, and she has received a number of notable awards including the inaugural Women Poets' Prize in 2018.

== Early life and education ==
Powles was born in Wellington in 1993. She is half Chinese-Malaysian, a granddaughter of ichthyologist Chin Phui Kong, and has said that she aims to address the poetry canon's bias towards white European men in her writing. She holds a master's degree in creative writing with distinction from the International Institute of Modern Letters at Victoria University of Wellington (2015). She received the university's Biggs Prize for Poetry for her master's portfolio, which subsequently became the collection Luminescent published in 2017 by Seraph Press.

== Career ==
=== Tiny Moons and Magnolia ===
Powles moved to Shanghai in 2016. The move inspired both her essay collection Tiny Moons: A Year of Eating in Shanghai (published in the UK by The Emma Press in 2020) and poetry collection Magnolia (published in New Zealand by Seraph Press and in the UK by Nine Arches Press in 2020). A review of Tiny Moons by Cha literary journal described it as "at once an intimate, personal account of Chinese food that will make you crave dumplings and noodles, as well as a profound contemplation on the notions of cultural hybridity, emotional landscapes and belonging". Magnolia was shortlisted for the 2021 Mary and Peter Biggs Award for Poetry at the Ockham New Zealand Book Awards and for the 2020 Felix Dennis Prize for Best First Collection. The Guardian described it as being part of a "wave of strong new poetry currently coming from Anglo-Asian voices".

Powles relocated to London in 2018. In the same year she was one of three recipients of the inaugural Women Poets' Prize. The judges commented that her work was of "incredible originality". She also received the Jane Martin Poetry Prize awarded by Girton College. In 2019, she was the joint winner of the Landfall Essay Competition. In the same year, she established a small publishing press called Bitter Melon 苦瓜, with a focus on publishing the works of other writers from the Asian diaspora.

=== Small Bodies of Water ===
In 2021 Powles' essay collection Small Bodies of Water was published by Canongate. It was reviewed by the Harvard Review, The Times Literary Supplement, and the Sydney Review of Books amongst other publications. An earlier version of the work received the inaugural Nan Shepherd Prize for nature writing in 2019. Bryony White, writing in the Los Angeles Review of Books, describes it as a "book that offers a kaleidoscopic taxonomy: of plants, colors, landscapes"; "questions about borders and belonging, migration and travel, twist throughout the book". Catherine Woulfe in The Spinoff said:

The book is pitched as being about the bodies of water in her cities and between her cities, and that’s a nice zoomed-out way to think of it, but it's hardly serene, dreamy, watery. These essays are heavily populated, dense with history and books and grandparents and cabbage butterflies and bags of mandarins and big fragrant bowls of phở.

In November 2024 she published the poetry pamphlet this too is a glistening (co-authored with Jessica J. Lee, Alycia Pirmohamed and Pratyusha).

=== In the Hollow of the Wave ===
Powles' 2025 poetry collection In the Hollow of the Wave was described by The Observer as offering a "striking vision of our beautiful, fragile world". It was included by Rebecca Tamás for The Guardian in an August 2025 roundup of best recent poetry collections; Tamás called it "luminous" and noted the work's focus on the power of creativity (including through clothing) and the beauty of nature. The title of the collection comes from To the Lighthouse by Virginia Woolf. A review in The Landfall Taureka Review said the collection "exudes a type of artisanal, deep-guild, slow time of care and attentiveness".

== Selected works ==
- Girls of the Drift (poetry chapbook, Seraph Press)
- Luminescent (poetry collection, Seraph Press, 2017)
- field notes on a downpour (poetry pamphlet, If a Leaf Falls Press, 2019)
- Tiny Moons: A Year of Eating in Shanghai (essay collection, The Emma Press, 2020)
- Magnolia (poetry collection, Seraph Press, 2020; UK edition published by Nine Arches Press)
- Small Bodies of Water (essay collection, Canongate, 2021)
- this too is a glistening (collaborative poetry pamphlet co-authored with Jessica J. Lee, Alycia Pirmohamed and Pratyusha, Bitter Melon, 2024)
- In the Hollow of the Wave (poetry collection, Nine Arches Press, 2025)
