= William Oxley =

English poet (1939–2020)

William Oxley (1939 – February 4, 2020) was an English poet. In addition to 31 poetry publications, he was also responsible for a range of books covering literary criticism, philosophy, fiction, plays and biography.

== Biography ==
Oxley began his career working as a messenger boy in Salford. He then became an articled clerk at Willett, Son & Garner, and qualified as a chartered accountant there. He began to write poetry after moving to London and working in the city, first for Deloitte and then Lazard.

Oxley's poems were widely published throughout the world, in magazines and journals as diverse as The New York Times, The Formalist (USA), The Scotsman, New Statesman, The London Magazine, Stand, The Independent, The Spectator and The Observer. Following the publication of a number of his works on the Continent in the 1980s and 1990s, Oxley was dubbed one of Britain's first Europoets. He read his work on UK and European radio and was said to be the only British poet to have read in Shangri-la, Nepal. He published his first volume of poetry in 1967, and his latest volume in 2015.

He founded the magazine Littack (Literature Attack) in 1972, and also edited the poetry publications New Headland (1969–74), Laissez-Faire (1971–75), Orbis (1972–74), The Village Review (1973–74), Poetry Newsletter (1976–78), The Littack Supplement (1976–80) and Lapis Lazuli (1977–78). He also co-edited the newsletter of the Long Poem Group for several years, as its founder.

In 1976, he moved to Devon with his family, and focused on poetry. His wife Patricia founded the literary journal Acumen in 1985, with William as treasurer and interviews editor.

He became a member of the general council of the Poetry Society in 1990, and opposed its commercialisation. In 2000, William was poet laureate for Torbay, the district covering Brixham, where he had moved to. This led to him and Patricia organising the Torbay Poetry Festival from 2001 to 2019.

A limited edition print employing lines from his epic poem, A Map of Time, was chosen by the Department of Cartography at the University of Wisconsin to use, with appropriate illustration, in their Annual Broadsheet for 2002. Another of his long poems, Over the Hills of Hampstead, was awarded first prize by the online long poem magazine, Echoes of Gilgamesh. In 2008, he received the Torbay ArtsBase Award for Literature. His work is featured on various websites, including, from its beginning, Anne Stewart's prestigious www.poetrypf.co.uk and www.creativetorbay.com. His archive was acquired by the British Library in 2014.

== Personal life ==
Oxley met Patricia Holmes through the Manchester Shakespeare Players, and they married in 1963. They had two daughters, Elizabeth Helen (b. 1966) and Katie Sarah (b. 1969). After originally settling in London, they moved to Brixham in South Devon with Patricia's mother in 1976. He died in February 2020, aged 80.

== Publications ==
- The Dark Structures, London, Mitre Press, 1967.
- New Workings, Esher, William Oxley, 1969.
- Passages from Time: Poems of a Life, Esher, Ember Press, 1971.
- The Icon Poems, Esher, Ember Press, 1972.
- Mirrors of the Sea, London, Quarto Press, 1973.
- Opera Vetera, Manchester, The Iconoclast Press, 1973.
- Eve Free, Knotting, Sceptre Press, 1974.
- Superfices, Aquila/The Phaethon Press, 1976.
- Wind (Barwell Broadside Number 11), Leicester, Cog Press, 1976.
- The Exile, Sedburgh, Uldale House, 1979.
- The Notebook of Hephaestus and Other Poems, Kinross, Lomond Press, 1981.
- A Map of Time, Salzburg, University of Salzburg, 1984.
- The Triviad and Other Satires, Salzburg, University of Salzburg, 1984.
- The Mansands Trilogy, Richmond, Surrey, Keepsake Press, 1988.
- Mad Tom on Tower Hill, Exeter, Stride, 1989.
- Forest Sequence, Bath, Mammon Press, 1991.
- The Patient Reconstruction of Paradise, Brixham, Devon, Acumen Publications, 1991.
- The Playboy Salzburg, University of Salzburg, 1992.
- In The Drift of Words, Ware, Rockingham Press, 1992.
- Cardboard Troy, Exeter, Stride, 1993.
- The Hallsands Tragedy, Plymouth, Westwords, 1993.
- Collected Longer Poems, Salzburg, University of Salzburg, 1994.
- The Green Crayon Man, Ware, Rockingham Press, 1997.
- Reclaiming the Lyre, New and Selected Poems, Ware, Rockingham Press, 2000.
- Namaste, Nepal Poems, London, Hearing Eye, 2004.
- London Visions, Bristol, Bluechrome, 2005.
- Poems Antibes, Ware, Rockingham Press, 2006.
- Sunlight in a Champagne Glass, Ware, Rockingham Press, 2009.
- ISCA ‒ Exeter Moments, Brixham, Ember Press 2013.
- Collected and New Poems, Ware, Rockingham Press, 2014.
- Walking Sequence and Other Poems, Beaworthy, Indigo Dreams, 2015.

=== Translations ===
- Poems of a Black Orpheus, Leopold S. Senghor, London, Menard Press, 1981.
- Ndessé, Leopold S. Senghor, London, Menard Press, 1981.
- She Chases Me Relentlessly, Leopold S. Senghor, London, Menard Press, 1986.
- Poems from the Divan of Hafez, (with Parvin Loloi), Torbay, Acumen Publications, 2013.

=== Other publications ===
- Synopthegms of a Prophet, Brixham, Devon, Ember Press, 1981.
- The Idea and its Imminence, Salzburg, University of Salzburg, 1982.
- Of Human Consciousness, Salzburg, University of Salzburg, 1982.
- The Cauldron of Inspiration, Salzburg, University of Salzburg, 1983.
- The Inner Tapestry, Salzburg, University of Salzburg, 1985.
- On Poets and Poetry: Letters Between a Father and Son, with Harry Oxley, edited by Patricia Oxley, Salzburg, University of Salzburg, 1988.
- Distinguishing Poetry, edited by Glyn Pursglove, Salzburg, University of Salzburg, 1989.
- Three Plays, Salzburg, University of Salzburg, 1996.
- No Accounting for Paradise : an autobiography, Ware, Rockingham Press 1999.
- Firework Planet : children's novel, Torbay, Acumen Publications, 2000.
- Working Backwards: A Poet's Notebook, Acumen Publications, 2008.
- Everyman His Own God, Brixham, Beugger Books, 2010.
- Democratica, Brixham, Beugger Books, 2011.
- The Language Game and Children, Brixham, Beugger Books, 2012.
- On and Off Parnassus, Ware, Rockingham Press, 2018.

=== Editor ===
- Completing the Picture – (Anthology), Exeter, Stride Publications, 1995.
- Long Poem Group Newsletter – (issues 1–12) (with Sebastian Barker), Torbay, Acumen Publications, 1995 – 2002.
- The Residency (Nos 1–2 only) Torbay, Acumen Publications, 2000 – 2001.
- Making a Splash, prize-winners' anthology (with Penelope Shuttle), Torbay, Acumen Publications, 2001.
- Modern Poets of Europe (with Patricia Oxley), Kathmandu, Nepal, Spiny Babbler, 2004.
