= Hilary Menos =

English poet (born 1964)

- Born: 1964 (age 61–62); Luton, England
- Education: University of Oxford; London College of Printing
- Occupation: Poet
- Writing career
- Language: English
- Notable works: Human Tissue; Berg
- Notable awards: The Poetry Business International Book & Pamphlet Competition (2014, ’19); Felix Dennis Prize for Best First Collection (2010)
- Website: hilarymenos.co.uk

Hillary Menos (born 1964) is an English poet. She is a two-time winner of The Poetry Business International Book & Pamphlet Competition, for her pamphlets Extra Maths and Human Tissue, and won the Forward Prize for Best First Collection for Berg (Seren) in 2010.

== Life ==
Menos was born in Luton in 1964, and studied Politics, Philosophy and Economics at Wadham College, Oxford. After Oxford, she took a diploma in Graphic Origination and Reproduction and a postgraduate diploma in Journalism, both at the London College of Printing, where she was also President of the Student Union 1987-88. Later, she worked as a journalist, and Time Out restaurant critic in London, before moving to Devon to renovate a Domesday Manor. Between 2004 and 2011/12, she and her husband, with their four sons, ran a 100-acre mixed organic farm near Totnes breeding pedigree Red Devon cows and Wiltshire Horn sheep.

She was awarded an MA in Creative Writing from Manchester Metropolitan University in 2013, and worked with Exeter-based children’s theatre company Quirk Theatre as dramaturge and script overseer.

== Work ==
Menos's first pamphlet, Extra Maths, selected by Gerard Benson, was a winner in The Poetry Business Book & Pamphlet Competition 2004, and her second pamphlet, Wheelbarrow Farm, was a winner in the Templar Poetry Pamphlet and Collection Competition 2010. She was included in Oxford Poets 2007: An Anthology, edited by David Constantine and Bernard O'Donoghue, published by Carcanet Press.

Her first collection, Berg (Seren, 2009), which has "poems about icebergs floating down the Thames and aliens wading in the Hudson River" won the Forward Prize for Best First Collection 2010. This, she won alongside Seamus Heaney, who was awarded the Forward Prize for Best Collection for his collection Human Chain (Faber, 2010). She was included in the Forward Book of Poetry 2011 as a "glittering debutant", and her second collection, Red Devon, was published by Seren in June 2013. She was later included in Poems of the Decade: An Anthology of the Forward Books of Poetry.

In August 2016, Hilary, Andy and, their youngest son, Inigo moved to France to renovate a fifteenth century Templar lodge in the Tarn and develop their web design company, Magic Bean. In 2018/19, she was a winner in The Poetry Business Book & Pamphlet Competition for the second time with her pamphlet, Human Tissue, which was selected by the judges Neil Astley, Michael Schmidt, and Amy Wack. Jonathan Edwards called Human Tissue's central theme a "powerful tale of a son’s kidney transplant". She is one of the few writers to have won The Poetry Business Competition twice. In 2021, they set up The Friday Poem. As a reviewer, she has written for Sphinx Review, PN Review and Warwick Review, among others. Menos's newest pamphlet is Fear of Forks, published by HappenStance Press in 2022. In a review, her writing in Fear of Forks has been praised for her "linguistic precision", noting the pamphlet as "convincing and satisfying. A proper meal with proper cutlery – one that lingers on the memory’s palate."

In 2024, Menos selected poems for and introduced the Candlestick Press anthology Ten Poems about Cows.

== Bibliography ==
=== Pamphlets ===
- Extra Maths (Smith❘Doorstop, 2005) ISBN 9781902382746
- Wheelbarrow Farm (Templar Poetry, 2010) ISBN 9781906285968
- Human Tissue (Smith/Doorstop, 2020) ISBN 9781912196784
- Fear of Forks (Happenstance Press, 2022)

=== Full-length collections ===
- Berg (Seren, 2009) ISBN 9781854115089
- Red Devon (Seren, 2013) ISBN 9781781720547

=== As editor ===
- Ten Poems about Cows (Candlestick Press, 2024) ISBN 9781913627393

== Awards ==
- 2004: The Poetry Business International Book & Pamphlet Competition for Extra Maths
- 2010: Templar Poetry Pamphlet and Collection Competition for Wheelbarrow Farm
- 2010: Forward Poetry Prize: Felix Dennis Prize for Best First Collection for Berg
- 2019: The Poetry Business International Book & Pamphlet Competition for Human Tissue
