= Sarah Wardle =

English poet

Sarah Wardle FRSA (born 1969) is an English poet.

== Life ==
Sarah Wardle was born in London in 1969, and educated at Cheltenham Ladies' College. She studied Classics at Lincoln College, Oxford, and English at Sussex University. She was President of Oxford University Conservative Association during Trinity term, 1989. In 1999, she won the Geoffrey Dearmer Memorial Prize and Poetry Review’s new poet of the year award. Her first collection of poetry, Fields Away, was published by Bloodaxe Books in 2003, and was shortlisted for the Forward Poetry Prize (Best First Collection).

Her poems have been published in, among others, The Evening Standard, The Guardian, The Herald (Glasgow), The Independent, The Independent on Sunday, The London Magazine, New Welsh Review, Poetry Review, The Times Higher Education Supplement and The Times Literary Supplement, as well as in many anthologies. A number of them have also been broadcast on radio and television. Wardle has written articles and reviews for magazines and newspapers such as Poetry Review, Writing in Education, the Times Higher Education Supplement, the Times Literary Supplement and The Observer. She was also Poet in Residence for Tottenham Hotspur F.C. Her second poetry collection, SCORE! (published by Bloodaxe Books in 2005), included some of the poems she broadcast while poet-in-residence for the club, as well as the script of a film-poem, ‘X: A Poetry Political Broadcast’. Her third collection, A Knowable World, was published by Bloodaxe Books in 2009.

Sarah Wardle is a lecturer in poetry at Middlesex University and lives in London. She is a Royal Literary Fund Fellow at Royal Holloway and a FRSA.

== Critical reaction ==
A Knowable World was reviewed by Sarah Crown in The Guardian on 24 January 2009. Crown described the collection as charting ‘the reel and plunge of the year [Wardle] spent in a psychiatric facility receiving treatment for bipolar disorder’. She noted that the collection contained 'poems of deep introspection, in which manic episodes, escape attempts and the baffling helplessness of incarceration are examined with agonised honesty'. She concluded that 'for the most part, these are convincing poems, delivered with a tight formality that echoes the strictures under which Wardle found herself, while at the same time providing her with a means of control over a terrifyingly ungovernable situation'.
