= Peter Sansom =

British poet (born 1958)

- Born: 1958 (age 67–68); Nottinghamshire, England
- Occupation: Poet

Peter Sansom (born 1958) is a British poet.

== Biography ==
Sansom was born in 1958 in Nottinghamshire. For ten years Peter taught the MA Poetry at Huddersfield University before becoming a Fellow in Creative Writing at Leeds University. He is currently Company Poet with Prudential. He is also a director with Ann Sansom of the Poetry Business in Sheffield, where they edit The North magazine and Smith/Doorstop Books.

Sansom's book, Writing Poems, is published by Bloodaxe (1994). Carcanet Press publish his five poetry collections: Everything You’ve Heard is True, a Poetry Book Society Recommendation (1990), January (1994), for which he received an Arts Council Writer's Bursary and an award from the Society of Authors, Point of Sale (2000) and The Last Place on Earth (2006).

The poet is married to the poet, Ann Sansom and has four children. He is a writer-in-residence with Marks and Spencer and a Guest Poet at The Times Educational Supplement. He has received commissions from The Guardian, The Observer, Radio Three, The Big Breakfast, a billboard in the centre of Lancaster and The Swedish Club which is a Marine Insurers in Gothenburg, among others.

== Works ==
- Everything You've Heard is True (Carcanet Press, 1990)
- January (Carcanet Press, 1994)
- Point of Sale (Carcanet Press, 2000)
- The Last Place on Earth (Carcanet Press, 2006)
- Selected Poems (Carcanet Press, 2010)
