= Women Poets' Prize =

UK literary award

The Women Poets' Prize is a British award for women poets. Between 2018 and 2022, it was awarded biennially by the Rebecca Swift Foundation to three female poets. As of 2024, the award is on hiatus due to funding difficulties.

== Establishment ==
The award and foundation were established in 2018 to honour the memory of Rebecca Swift, a poet, essayist, editor, and founder of The Literary Consultancy. The goals are to support "poetry and the empowerment of women" and a diverse group of poets. It was announced at the Second Home Poetry Festival in June 2018.

== Inaugural awards in 2018 ==
In 2018, the award accepted submissions in June and July before announcing a shortlist later in the year and the winners in October. The jurors were Moniza Alvi, Fiona Sampson, and Sarah Howe. In 2018, the first shortlist for the award included nine poets: Jenna Clarke, Claire Collison, Alice Hiller, Holly Hopkins, Bryony Littlefair, Anita Pati, Nina Mingya Powles, Em Strang, and Jemilea Wisdom-Baako.

Ultimately, the award was given, on 31 October 2018, to Claire Collison, Anita Pati, and Nina Mingya Powles. According to Bustle and The Guardian, Powles was selected for her work's "incredible originality" and Collison was selected because her work was "mesmerising, with unusual and subtle shifts", while the judges said that Pati's work was "full of linguistic and sonic quirk, with a great display of emotional intelligence."

Each of the three winners received £1,000 and support from the Rebecca Swift Foundation and its partner organizations and two mentors, one for poetry and one to help them with their life.

== Later awards ==
The 2020 award winners were Alisha Dietzman, Natalie Linh Bolderston, and Warda Yassin. The award prize money was increased to £1,500, and the 2020 jurors were Liz Berry, Malika Booker and Pascale Petit.

In 2022, the award winners were Jennifer Lee Tsai, Dillon Jaxx and Prerana Kumar. The winners were announced at a one-day festival hosted by the National Centre for Writing in Norwich. The award prize money was £1,000 each, and the 2022 jurors were Abi Palmer, Penelope Shuttle and Nikita Gill.

The Rebecca Swift Foundation postponed the award for 2024 due to an inability to secure funding from Arts Council England.
