= Kim Moore =

Kim Moore may refer to:

- Kim Moore (curler)
- Kim Moore (poet)

== See also ==
- Kimberly A. Moore, American lawyer and jurist
