= Sasha Debevec-McKenney =

Sasha Debevec-McKenney is an American poet. Her debut poetry collection, Joy Is My Middle Name, was published in 2025 and won the 2026 Swansea University Dylan Thomas Prize. She previously won the Poetry Society's Geoffrey Dearmer Prize in 2024.

== Career ==
Debevec-McKenney was born in Hartford, Connecticut. She received an MFA from New York University. She later held the Jay C. and Ruth Halls Poetry Fellowship at the University of Wisconsin and was a creative writing fellow at Emory University. Her poetry has appeared in publications including The New Yorker, The New York Review of Books and The Yale Review.

== Awards ==
She won the Geoffrey Dearmer Prize in 2024 for I Went Out to See All The Downed Trees. Two years later, Joy Is My Middle Name won the Swansea University Dylan Thomas Prize.
