= Geoffrey Dearmer Award =

Annual Poetry Prize

The Geoffrey Dearmer Award is an annual poetry prize founded in 1997 and run by the Poetry Society in memory of the poet Geoffrey Dearmer (1893–1996), who at 103 was the Society's oldest member. By establishing an endowment fund, the Dearmer family has enabled the Poetry Society to award an annual prize to the best poem in The Poetry Review by a poet who had not, before the issue in which their work appeared, published a collection. The winner of the prize is announced in the summer issue of The Poetry Review.

== Awards ==
- 2024 Sasha Debevec-McKenney for "I Went Out to See All The Downed Trees"
- 2023 Asmaa Jama for "sympathy for ishaq (after Ladan Osman)"
- 2022 J.L.M. Morton for "Lifecycle of the Cochineal Beetle, c.1788"
- 2021 Samatar Elmi for "The Snails"
- 2020 Dean Browne for "The Last Consultation"
- 2019 Phoebe Stuckes for "Thus I became a heart-eater"
- 2018 Mary Jean Chan for "Flèche"
- 2017 Raymond Antrobus for "Sound Machine"
- 2016 Wayne Holloway-Smith for "Short"
- 2015 Laura Scott for "The Half-loved"
- 2014 Zaffar Kunial for "The Word", "Q" and "Fielder"
- 2013 Mir Mahfuz Ali
- 2012 Kayo Chingonyi
- 2011 Denise Saul
- 2010 Kim Moore
- 2009 Maitreyabandhu
- 2008 Kearan Williams
- 2007 Neetha Kunaratnam
- 2006 Tamara Fulcher
- 2005 Andrew Bailey
- 2004 Lucie McKee
- 2003 Rebecca O'Connor
- 2002 David Gravender
- 2001 Michael Murphy
- 2000 Anna Wigley
- 1999 Sarah Wardle
- 1998 Paul Farley

== About the Poetry Society ==
The Poetry Society's mission is to advance the study, use and enjoyment of poetry.

The Poetry Society was founded in 1909 to 'promote "a more general recognition and appreciation of poetry". Since then, it has grown into one of Britain's most dynamic arts organisations, representing British poetry both nationally and internationally. Today it has nearly 4000 members worldwide and publishes the leading poetry magazine, The Poetry Review.
