= Rebecca Tamás =

British poet and academic (born 1988)

- Born: 1988 (age 37–38); London, England
- Education: University of Warwick and University of Edinburgh and University of East Anglia
- Occupations: Poet, writer, critic, editor
- Writing career
- Genres: Poetry, essays

Rebecca Tamás (born 1988) is a Hungarian-British poet, writer, critic, and editor. She is the daughter of Hungarian philosopher and public intellectual Gáspár Miklós Tamás.

Tamás studied creative writing at the University of Warwick and at the University of Edinburgh, where she won the Grierson Verse Prize, before completing a PhD at the University of East Anglia. She is a lecturer in creative writing at York St John University, where she co-convenes The York Centre for Writing Poetry Series.

== Work ==
Tamás is the editor, with Sarah Shin, of the anthology Spells: 21st-century Occult Poetry (Ignota Press, 2018). She has published three pamphlets of poetry: The Ophelia Letters (Salt, 2013), Savage (Clinic, 2017) and Tiger (Bad Betty Press, 2018), and the full-length poetry collection Witch (Penned in the Margins, 2019). The poet and journalist Ben Wilkinson, writing in The Guardian, said that Witch "has caused a stir, and it's not hard to see why". Tamás has been described in this is tomorrow magazine as "crafting a world of linguistic ritual and transformation around her". In 2020, she published the prose collection Strangers: Essays on the Human and Nonhuman. MAP Magazine commissioned three responses from artists to the book.

The composer Freya Waley-Cohen has set eight poems from WITCH to music: the first complete performance of Spell Book took place at Milton Court in London on 1 February 2024. Waley-Cohen's opera WITCH, with libretto by Ruth Mariner, was inspired by the Rebecca Tamás collection of the same name. It was staged at the Royal Academy of Music in 2022, and at Longborough Festival Opera the same year. Waley-Cohen has said that she was attracted to the way Tamás's "language flips between shocking and beautiful, catching your attention and making you see something shocking in a new light".

Tamás's writing has appeared in publications including London Review of Books, Financial Times, The Poetry Review, The White Review, The Guardian, ArtReview, and Frieze.

Tamás was the joint winner of the 2016 Manchester Poetry Prize.

== Awards ==
- 2016: Joint winner, Manchester Poetry Prize
- 2017: Fenton Arts Trust Emerging Writer Award
- 2017: Joint winner, London Review of Books Bookshop Pamphlet of the Year

== Works ==
=== Poetry ===
- The Ophelia Letters (Salt Publishing, 2013) ISBN 9781844719525
- Savage (Clinic, 2017) ISBN 9780993318245
- Tiger (Bad Betty Press, 2018)
- WITCH (Penned in the Margins, 2019) ISBN 9781908058621

=== Essays ===
- Strangers: Essays on the Human and Nonhuman (Makina Books, 2020) ISBN 9781916060890
