= England's Green =

Poetry collection published in England

England's Green is a poetry collection by Zaffar Kunial published in London by Faber in 2022.

== Reviews ==
- "England's Green by Zaffar Kunial". Lonesome Reader. 2023-03-03.
- Al-Amoudi, Fahad (2023-04-03). "England's Green: Zaffar Kunial Faber, London 2022, pb, 80pp, £10.99 ISBN 9780571376797 | www.faber.co.uk". Wasafiri. 38 (2): 112–114. doi:10.1080/02690055.2023.2170599. ISSN 0269-0055.
- Leonard, Dominic. "Words have deep pockets: Deciphering postcolonial England". TLS.
