= Dean Browne =

Irish poet (born 1993/1994)

Dean Browne (born 1993 or 1994) is an Irish poet.

He won the 2020 Geoffrey Dearmer Award for his poem "The Last Consultation".

His pamphlet Kitchens at Night won the 2021 Poetry Business International Book & Pamphlet Competition .

His 2025 debut book After Party was a Poetry Book Society recommendation for autumn 2025.

He was appointed as the 2026 writer in residence at University College Cork, and was chosen by United Kingdom poet laureate Simon Armitage to take part in the poet laureate's 2026 library tour event at Newcastle, County Down.

== Selected publications ==
- Browne, Dean (2025). After Party. Picador. ISBN 978-1035054671.
- Browne, Dean (2022). Kitchens at Night. Newcastle upon Tyne: Poetry Business, The. ISBN 978-1914914041.
