= Ethnicism =

Ethnicism is a neologism that may refer to:

- Emphasis on ethnicity
- Ethnic hatred, notions and acts of prejudice and hostility towards an ethnic group
- Ethnic hierarchy in societies with formal ethnic equality
- Ethnic loyalty
- Ethnic nationalism, a form of nationalism in which the nation and nationality are defined in terms of ethnicity
- Ethnic religion, a religion or belief associated with a particular ethnicity
- Halkçılık, a form of Turkish ethnicism
- Völkisch movement, a form of German ethnicism

== See also ==
- The dictionary definition of ethnicism at Wiktionary
- Ethicism, the application of ethics
- Ethnocentrism – Judging another culture by the values and standards of one's own culture
