= Gáspár Miklós Tamás =

Hungarian philosopher (1948–2023)

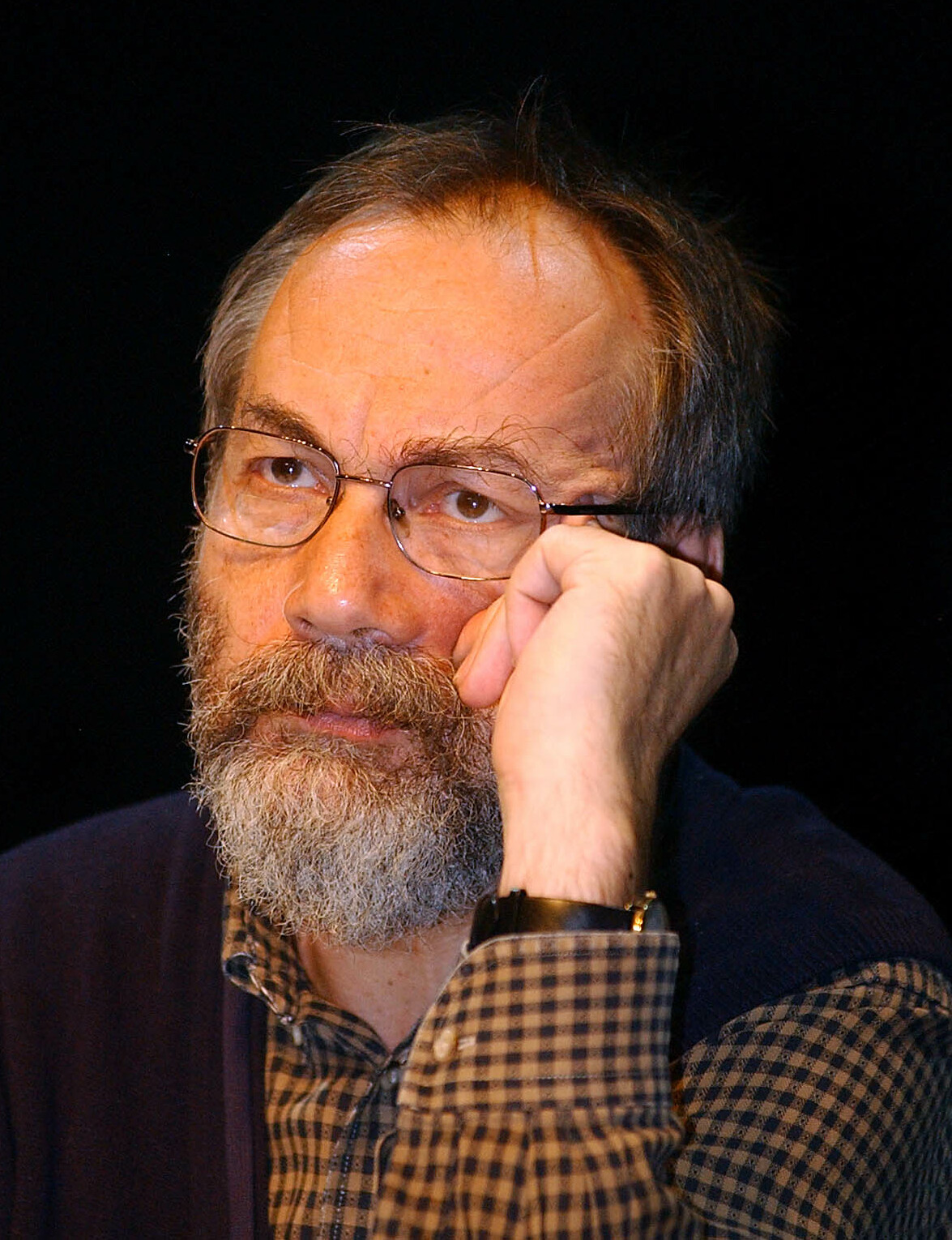
- Born: 28 November 1948; Cluj, Romania
- Died: 15 January 2023 (aged 74); Budapest, Hungary

Education
- Education: Babeș-Bolyai University

Philosophical work
- Era: 21st-century philosophy
- Region: Western philosophy
- School: Continental philosophy Libertarian socialism
- Main interests: Political theory
- Notable ideas: Post-fascism, ethnicism

Signature
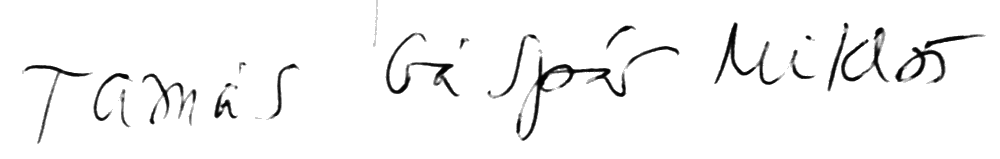

Gáspár Miklós Tamás (Hungarian: Tamás Gáspár Miklós; 28 November 1948 – 15 January 2023), often referred to as TGM, was a Transylvanian-born Hungarian political philosopher and public intellectual, influenced by Marxism and libertarian socialism. He was a contributor to online newspaper Mérce and to OpenDemocracy, where he wrote primarily about political and aesthetic questions. He was the father of Hungarian-British poet and writer Rebecca Tamás.

== Biography ==
Gáspár Miklós Tamás was born in today's Cluj, Romania. He emigrated to Budapest, Hungary, in 1978, after being harassed by the Securitate. His mother was Jewish and escaped being deported to Auschwitz because she was imprisoned for being a communist. As a dissident at the end of the state socialist period, he was initially a libertarian socialist. While in contact with libertarian authors, his perspective was distinct from the Budapest School, a major school of thought in Hungarian Neo-Marxism. He was also a member of the informal group called the "democratic opposition".

From 1986 to 1988, he taught in the U.S., Britain, and France, and also continued his studies at Oxford University. At the beginning of the post-socialist era in 1989, he became committed to a liberal program, and was a leader of the Alliance of Free Democrats (SZDSZ). As a representative of the party, he was a member of the Hungarian Parliament from 1989 to 1994, and served the party's president through 1994, departing the party in 2000. He was a prominent democratic opponent of the Hungarian government under János Kádár and Viktor Orbán. He became the Green Left's president in 2010.

Tamás was known for developing the concept of post-fascism and the term ethnicism. In his words,

Post-fascism finds its niche easily in the new world of global capitalism without upsetting the dominant political forms of electoral democracy and representative government. It does what I consider to be central to all varieties of fascism, including the post-totalitarian version. Sans Führer, sans one-party rule, sans SA or SS, post-fascism reverses the Enlightenment tendency to assimilate citizenship to the human condition.

Tamás died on 15 January 2023, at the age of 74.

== Personal life ==
He described himself as a "conservative anarchist" and a Marxist.

== Bibliography ==
=== Books in English ===
- Tamás, Gáspar Miklós (2011). Innocent Power. Stuttgart, Germany: Hatje Cantz Verlag. ISBN 9783775728621.

=== Books in French ===
- Tamás, Gáspar Miklós (1985). L'Oeil et la main: Introduction à la politique [The Eye and the Hand: Introduction to Politics] (in French). Geneva, Switzerland: Éditions Noir. OCLC 33315996.

=== Books in German ===
- Tamás, Gáspar Miklós (2015). Kommunismus nach 1989: Beiträge zu Klassentheorie, Realsozialismus, Osteuropa [Communism after 1989: Contributions to Class Theory, Real Socialism, Eastern Europe] (in German). Vienna, Austria: Mandelbaum Verlag. ISBN 9783854766414.

=== Books in Hungarian ===
- Tamás, Gáspar Miklós (1975). A teória esélyei: Esszék, bírálatok [The Prospects for Theory: Essays and Reviews] (in Hungarian). Bucharest, Romania: Kriterion. OCLC 909543438.
- Tamás, Gáspar Miklós (1994). Másvilág: Politikai esszék [Another World: Political Essays] (in Hungarian). Budapest, Hungary: Új Mandátum. ISBN 9789637476204.
- Tamás, Gáspar Miklós (1999). Törzsi fogalmak [Tribal Concepts] (in Hungarian). Vol. I–II. Budapest, Hungary: Atlantisz. ISBN 9789639165267.
- Tamás, Gáspár Miklós (2021) Antitézis [Antithesis] (in Hungarian). Budapest, Hungary: Pesti Kalligram. ISBN 9789634682035
