= Maitreyabandhu =

British Buddhist writer and poet (born 1961)

Ian Johnson (born 1961), known by his Dharma name Maitreyabandhu, is a British Buddhist writer and poet who lives and works at the London Buddhist Centre. He has written a number of books on Buddhism. His poetry has been published by Bloodaxe and awarded the Keats-Shelley Prize and the Geoffrey Dearmer Award.

== Early life ==
Johnson was born in Henley-in-Arden, Warwickshire. In the 1980s, he trained as a nurse at Walsgrave Hospital in Coventry then studied fine art at Goldsmiths College in London.

== Buddhism ==
He has said he was an "habitual misery" who eventually found "something you might call happiness" after being introduced to meditation and Buddhism. He began attending classes at the London Buddhist Centre (LBC) in 1986, and moved into a residential community there in 1987, where he remains. He was ordained into The Triratna Buddhist Order in 1990, is now a senior teacher at the LBC and is the former director of Breathing Space, a well-being centre there.

His book Life With Full Attention: a Practical Course in Mindfulness (2009) is an eight-week course "steeped in ancient spiritual teachings, but aimed squarely at modern, secular readers, who are contending with complicated lives."

== Poetry ==
Reviewing his book The Crumb Road (2013) in The Guardian, Sean O'Brien wrote that "Maitreyabandhu is interesting for being one who notices, and for the care he brings to his observations of people, events, places and memories. But unlike Hardy and most other poets, he is inclined to be self-effacing, even when writing about himself." Also in The Guardian, Carol Rumens described "The Man" from The Crumb Road as "Typically, it's a poem which seems to present a reassuringly ordinary and familiar scenario, while slowly making the reader aware that something unusual is going on."

Reviewing his book Yarn (2015) in the Times Literary Supplement, Frank Lawton wrote: "Composed of four discrete but symbolically linked sections, Yarn embraces the spirit, if not the strict form, of Japanese renga poetry. [. . . ] The book displays an accomplished formal variety, taking in free verse, sonnets, blank verse, dramatic monologues and a series of rather less successful prose poems."

His book After Cézanne (2019) examines the life and work of the post-impressionist painter Paul Cézanne. A sequence of lyric poems by Maitreyabandhu "written in different voices to, about and "as" Cézanne", in chronological order, is interleaved with reproductions of Cezanne's paintings.

== Publications ==
=== Books about Buddhism by Maitreyabandhu ===
- Thicker than Blood (Friendship on the Buddhist Path) Cambridge: Windhorse, 2001. ISBN 978-1899579396.
- Life With Full Attention: a Practical Course in Mindfulness. Cambridge: Windhorse, 2009. ISBN 9781899579983.
- The Journey and the Guide: a Practical Course in Enlightenment. Cambridge: Windhorse, 2015. ISBN 9781909314092.

=== Pamphlets of poetry by Maitreyabandhu ===
- The Bond. Smith/Doorstop, 2011. ISBN 978-1906613488.
- Vita Brevis. Matlock: Templar Poetry, 2012. ISBN 978-1906285876.

=== Books of poetry by Maitreyabandhu ===
- The Crumb Road. Hexham, UK: Bloodaxe, 2013. ISBN 9781852249748.
- Yarn. Hexham, UK: Bloodaxe, 2015. ISBN 9781780372624.
- After Cézanne. Hexham, UK: Bloodaxe, 2019. ISBN 9781780374826. Poems by Maitreyabandhu and reproductions of paintings by Paul Cézanne. With an introduction by Christopher Lloyd.
- A Cézanne Haibun. Sheffield: The Poetry Business, 2019. ISBN 978-1912196241.

=== Books with contributions by Maitreyabandhu ===
- Queer Dharma: Voices of Gay Buddhists. San Francisco: Gay Sunshine, 1997. ISBN 978-0940567221.

== Awards and recognition ==
- 2009: Winner, Geoffrey Dearmer Award from the Poetry Society for "Visitation"
- 2009: Winner, Keats-Shelley Prize for Poetry from the Keats-Shelley Memorial Association, for "The Small Boy and the Mouse". A £3000 award.
- 2012: Shortlisted, Michael Marks Awards for Poetry Pamphlets from the Michael Marks Charitable Trust and the British Library for The Bond
- 2013: The Crumb Road was a Poetry Book Society Recommendation
