= Moniza Alvi =

Pakistani-British poet and writer (born 1954)

Moniza Alvi FRSL
- Born: 2 February 1954; Lahore, Pakistan
- Education: University of York
- Occupation: Poet
- Children: one daughter
- Website: moniza.uk

Moniza Alvi FRSL (born 2 February 1954) is a British-Pakistani writer and poet. She has won several well-known prizes for her verse. She was elected as a Fellow of the Royal Society of Literature in 2023.

== Life and education ==
Moniza Alvi was born in Lahore, Pakistan, to a Pakistani father and a British mother. Her father moved to Hatfield, Hertfordshire, in England when Alvi was few months old. She did not revisit Pakistan until after the publication of one of her first books of poems – The Country at My Shoulder. She worked for several years as a high-school teacher but is currently a freelance writer and tutor, living in Norfolk.

== Poetry ==
Peacock Luggage, a book of poems by Moniza Alvi and Peter Daniels, was published after the two poets jointly won the Poetry Business Prize in 1991, in Alvi's case for "Presents from my Aunts in Pakistan". That poem and "An Unknown Girl" have featured on England's GCSE exam syllabus for young teenagers.

Since then, Moniza Alvi has written over half a dozen poetry collections. Her debut poetry collection, The Country at My Shoulder (1993), which was shortlisted for the T. S. Eliot Prize 1993, led to her being selected for the Poetry Society's New Generation Poets promotion in 1994. She also published a series of short stories, How the Stone Found its Voice (2005), inspired by Kipling's Just So Stories.

In 2002, she received a Cholmondeley Award for her poetry. In 2003 a selection of her poetry was published in a bilingual Dutch and English edition. A selection from her earlier books, Split World: Poems 1990–2005, was published alongside Europa in 2008. Both Europa and her new collection At the Time of Partition, published in 2013, were then shortlisted for the T. S. Eliot Prize in their respective years.

On 16 January 2014, Alvi participated in the BBC Radio 3 series The Essay – Letters to a Young Poet. Taking Rainer Maria Rilke's classic text, Letters to a Young Poet as their inspiration, leading poets wrote a letter to a protégé.

== Selected works ==
=== Poetry ===
- Peacock Luggage (1991)
- The Country at My Shoulder (Oxford Poetry, 1993) ISBN 978-0-19283-125-5
- A Bowl Of Warm Air (1996)
- Carrying my Wife (Bloodaxe Books, 2000) ISBN 978-1-85224-537-5
- Souls (Bloodaxe, 2002) ISBN 978-1-85224-585-6
- How the Stone Found Its Voice (Bloodaxe, 2005) ISBN 978-1-85224-694-5 – which was inspired by Kipling's Just So Stories
- Split World: Poems 1990–2005 (Bloodaxe, 2008) ISBN 978-1-85224-802-4
- Europa (Bloodaxe, 2008) ISBN 978-1852248031
- At the Time of Partition (Bloodaxe, 2013) ISBN 978-1-85224-984-7
- Homesick For The Earth (Bloodaxe, 2011) ISBN 978-1852249205
- Blackbird, Bye Bye (Bloodaxe, 2018) ISBN 978-1780374222
- Fairoz (Bloodaxe, 2022) ISBN 978-1780376004

=== Recordings ===
- The Poetry Quartets 6 with George Szirtes, Michael Donaghy and Anne Stevenson (Bloodaxe / British Council, 2001) ISBN 978-1-85224-519-1
