= Ann Sansom =

British poet and writing tutor

Ann Sansom is a British poet and writing tutor. She has written two full length collections of poetry (both published by Bloodaxe Books) and her work has appeared in anthologies, newspapers and magazines around the world. She is currently a regular tutor for the Workers' Educational Association, Poetry Society and Arvon Foundation; and has taught at Sheffield Hallam University, University of Leeds, University of Exeter and University of Oxford. As well as giving hundreds of readings and workshops in the UK over the last two decades, Ann has also read and taught in India, Finland and Greece.

== Literary awards ==
- 1994 – YHA bursary for Irish poetry translation
- 1998 – Arts Council Literature Award
- 2003 – Author’s Foundation Award from the Society of Authors

== Publications ==
=== Collections ===
- 1989 Painting From Memory [as Ann Dancy], Smith/Doorstop
- 1990 Opening the Ice [as Ann Dancy], Smith/Doorstop
- 1994 Romance, Bloodaxe Books
- 1999 Vehicle, Slow Dancer Press
- 2003 In Praise of Men and Other People, Bloodaxe Books

=== Anthologies ===
- 1992 The Virago Book of Wicked Verse (ed. Jill Dawson), Virago Press
- 1992 The Red Deer Anthology, Red Deer
- 1995 The Forward Book of Poetry, Forward/Faber
- 1995 Poetry with an Edge (ed. Neil Astley), Bloodaxe Books
- 1996 The Forward Book of Poetry, Forward/Faber
- 1996 The Long Pale Corridor, Bloodaxe Books
- 1997 Making for Planet Alice (ed. Maura Dooley), Bloodaxe Books
- 1999 New Blood (ed. Neil Astley), Bloodaxe Books
- 2001 Poems of the Decade, Forward/Faber
- 2006 Images of Women (ed. Myra Schneider and Dilys Wood), Arrowhead Press
- 2007 Signs and Humours: The Poetry of Medicine (ed. Lavinia Greenlaw), Calouste Gulbenkian Foundation

=== Newspapers and magazines ===
- Poetry Review (various editions)
- Times Literary Supplement (various editions)
- Vogue (Russia) 1999
- Purple Magazine (France) 1999
- Attitude (USA) 1999
- Art and the Artist 2001
- The Guardian
- The Independent
- Atlanta Review
- Carapace (South Africa)
- Horisont (Finland/Sweden)
- London Magazine
- Pennine Platform
- The Rialto
- Second Light
- The Wide Skirt
- Writing Women

=== As editor ===
- Doncaster Women’s Centre group anthologies (1992, 94, 99)
- Oakwell Hall anthology (1997)
- Leeds University Poetry in Education (1998, 99)
- Guest poet at the Times Educational Supplement (1999)
- Poetry in Motion, Penistone Line Project (2000)

=== Scripts ===
Ann has written and directed two stage plays for Yorkshire Women’s Theatre, one play for BBC Radio 4 and is currently working with a director on a short film script based on one of her poems.

Ann also co-wrote the script for the 'Genie' exhibition at the Magna Science Adventure Centre that was piloted in late 2006.

"Oh great one, to restore my power, tell me what I am like. I will ask questions so that you can tell my story [. . .] Every idea is a good idea, however simple or odd or rushed, because it is yours."

Children access the 'genie spirit' inside the exhibits using a 'magic mirror' (a tablet PC). The children interact with the genie, and produce poems that become 'memory stories' for the genie.

== Reviews ==
In Praise of Men and Other People
"Ann Sansom's new collection is a welcome return for a quietly authoritative, resiliently gritty poet whose debut collection. Romance, won her many admirers. These are poems that overturn readers' expectations. They often present human dramas in which people are seen as acting out their versions of themselves in their own fictions. They are set in curiously deracinated urban landscapes, homing in on chance encounters and missed connections, and balanced by a brisk authenticity and affectionate generosity."
Times Literary Supplement

Romance
"Ann Sansom’s naturally accomplished and instinctively organised poems come as a breath of fresh air … There is a maturity to her work, a sureness of hand associated with only the most established poets, but there is a freshness too, and a bareknuckle confidence that seems to sing of the author’s realisation of poetry as a first language and a mother tongue."
Simon Armitage

Opening the Ice
"A clear sense of narrative illuminated by accurate observation . . . with a sharp edge of personal involvement, of love and love lost that gives her poems an intimate feel. Warm, direct and delicately phrased."
David Harmer
