= Jonathan Edwards (poet) =

Welsh poet (born 1979)

- Born: 16 October 1979 (age 47); Newport, Wales
- Occupation: Poet
- Writing career
- Language: English
- Period: 2010–present
- Notable works: My Family and Other Superheroes (2014)
- Notable awards: Costa Book Award for Poetry, 2014

Jonathan Edwards (born 16 October 1979) is a Welsh poet, who was born in Newport and grew up in Crosskeys. His debut poetry collection My Family and Other Superheroes won the Costa Book Award for Poetry in 2014.

== Biography ==
Edwards first came to prominence as the winner of the Terry Hetherington Award in 2010, before picking up prizes at both the Cardiff International Poetry Competition and the Basil Bunting Poetry Competition in 2012.

His first book, the poetry collection My Family and Other Superheroes, won a £1,000 first-place prize at the Ledbury Poetry Festival's International Competition in 2014, and the Costa Book Award for Poetry in 2014. Edwards described the collection as reflecting a sense of Welsh pop culture and its relation to broader Western culture, history, family, and the lives of ordinary people. According to coverage of the Costa Award by The Daily Telegraph, My Family and Other Superheroes saw "celebrities and fictional characters such as Sophia Loren and Evel Knievel collide with reflections on the social architecture of working class Welsh valleys."

Edwards holds a BA in English and American Literature and an MA in writing from the University of Warwick. After winning the Terry Hetherington Award in 2010, he later went on to judge the award, and also edited the award's Cheval anthology between 2013 and 2017. He currently teaches English at a secondary school in Monmouth.

== Publications ==
=== Poetry ===
- 2014: My Family and Other Superheroes, Seren
- 2018: Gen, Seren

=== As editor ===
- 2013: Cheval 6: The Terry Hetherington Award Anthology 2013 (ed. with Alan Perry), Parthian
- 2014: Cheval 7: The Terry Hetherington Award Anthology 2014 (ed. with Alan Perry), Parthian
- 2015: Cheval 8: The Terry Hetherington Award Anthology 2015 (ed. with Alan Perry), Parthian
- 2016: Cheval 9: The Terry Hetherington Award Anthology 2016 (ed. with Rose Widlake), Parthian
- 2017: Cheval 10: The Terry Hetherington Award Anthology 2017 (ed. with Glyn Edwards and Rose Widlake), Parthian
