= Halkçılık =

Turkish ideology

Halkçılık, sometimes translated from Turkish as populism or folkism, is an idea influenced by narodnik and populism, especially influential in Turkey. If used as a system of governance based on people's rule and solidarity, it may refer to an ideology associated with corporatism and solidarism, and ideas of collective cooperation and unity among different social groups.

== History ==
=== Ottoman period ===
During the reign of Sultan Abdulaziz, some Ottoman intellectuals, especially Ali Suavi, were influenced by the Narodnik movement in Russia and began to deal with the problems of the people. At the end of the 19th century, many literary figures, especially Mehmet Emin Yurdakul, were affected by populism. After the Young Turk Revolution, the word 'folk' found wide usage. For a long time, populism was thought of as the act of benevolent intellectuals for the benefit of the masses.

This understanding began to change after World War I. Ziya Gökalp concluded, under the influence of Durkheim, that class conflict was bad, and shortly after the Soviet Revolution in 1917, opposed it and defended populism against it. Gökalp defined populism as follows:

If a society consists of several strata or classes, then it is not an egalitarian society. The aim of populism is to suppress stratification or class differences and instead to create a social structure of professional groups in solidarity with each other. In other words, we can summarize populism as follows: there are no social classes, there are professions!

=== Turkish War of Independence and the Republic period ===
This approach largely lends itself to solidarism. This understanding greatly influenced nationalists, especially the Kemalists, during the Turkish War of Independence. Although the corporations proposed by Gökalp were not realized, the principle of no classes was accepted by the Kemalist leaders. Kemalist leaders, especially Atatürk, insisted that classes were not yet developed in Turkey. They adopted the idea of solidarity in order to fight communism and the idea of class struggle. They also saw this as the justification for the one-party system.

== Atatürk's principle of halkçılık ==
The principle of halkçılık, first of all, is aimed at the realization and establishment of a progressive Western democracy, which means "the administration of the people, by the people for the people". It also prioritizes national sovereignty. The state aims at the welfare and happiness of the citizens. It envisages the division of labor and solidarity among citizens. It ensures that the nation enjoys equal access to government services. It is understood from Atatürk's halkçılık principle that: No privilege is given to any person, group or any class in society. Everyone is equal before the law. According to the principle of halkçılık, no one can gain superiority over others in terms of religion, race or money when judged before the law.

Halkçılık is defined in the six pillars of the Republican People's Party founded by Mustafa Kemal as follows: "For us, people must be treated equally before the law. No distinction should be made between class, family and individuals. We believe that the people of Turkey are not as a whole made up of various classes, but as a whole; as one. We see Turkish society as having various professions according to the needs of social life." However, this should not be confused with collectivism. The "halkçılık" that Atatürk refers to here is not a socialist ideology used by left-wing countries and is also not incompatible with individualism. Atatürk's halkçılık, as mentioned in the 1935 CHP program and Atatürk's Medeni Bilgiler book, is solidarist based on the solidarity of the classes and also egalitarian.

Necessary measures have been taken for equality between women and men, the end of sex segregation in schools, the measures taken to prepare a new Turkish alphabet that every citizen can learn and to treat every citizen equally before state organs support the principle of halkçılık.

According to Ahmet Taner Kışlalı, Kemalist halkçılık wanted to strengthen the poorest and most uneducated segment of the society and to ensure social solidarity.

Although halkçılık is a principle that is quickly adopted, after World War II, it remained largely in the background during the rapid industrialization and capitalistization process.
