= Ledbury Poetry Festival =

UK literary festival founded in 1992

Founded in 1996 by a group of local poetry enthusiasts, the Ledbury Poetry Festival is now the biggest poetry festival in the UK.

== History ==
The first Ledbury Poetry Festival was held in 1997 in Ledbury, Herefordshire. It was opened by jazz singer, critic and writer George Melly. The following year it was opened by Mark Fisher, the Labour arts minister. Since then, over a thousand national and international poets have taken part in the festival. Patrons include the Poet Laureate, Carol Ann Duffy, and Peter Florence, founder of the Hay Festival. Trustees include Ursula Owen, publisher, editor and campaigner for free expression, and Neil Astley, editor of Bloodaxe Books. The original trustees of the festival were Peter Arscott, John Burns, Alan Lloyd, Martyn Moxley, Richard Surman and Margaret Rigby.

Ledbury holds its main programme over two weeks in the summer, and its work continues throughout the year, with projects that involve local primary schools and John Masefield High School, as well as hundreds of local people through its community projects. The Festival also works alongside small literary publishers.

In 2009, The Guardian described the Ledbury Poetry Festival as "the largest of its kind in the UK and also the most energised, giving a real sense of poetry as an important living, contemporary literary form."

In 2017 the Ledbury Poetry Festival celebrated its 21st anniversary by launching the biannual Ledbury Forte Poetry Prize for Second Collections, the only prize of this kind in the UK. This prize aims to support and encourage poets at the ‘mid-career’ stage with a prize of £5,000 for the winning second collection.

== Support ==
The Ledbury Poetry Festival receives financial support from Arts Council England, Versopolis Poetry, the Pennington-Mellor-Munthe Charity Trust, Garfield Weston Foundation and The Elmley Foundation.

== Poets ==
British poets who have performed at the festival include Simon Armitage, Al Alvarez, Patience Agbabi, Wendy Cope, John Burnside, Helen Dunmore, Douglas Dunn, James Fenton, Ruth Padel, George Szirtes and Benjamin Zephaniah. International poets include Billy Collins, Mark Doty (USA), Yang Lian (China), Gozo Yoshimasu (Japan), Ko Un (Korea), Kristina Ehin (Estonia), Ali Cobby Eckerman (Australia), Basem Al-Nabriss (Palestine), Fadhil Al-Azzawi (Iraq) and Arundhathi Subramaniam (India).

== Ledbury Poetry Festival Poetry Competition (2018) ==
Judge: Nia Davies

Adult Winners

“All the Bleak Chippies” - R.T.A. Parker (United States of America)
“Through the Hologram” - Pam Thompson (United Kingdom)
“Deeds” - Robbie Burton (United Kingdom)

Young Persons Winners

“essay on grief / a holiday” - Annie Fan (United States of America)
“Collins ” - Georgie Woodhead (United Kingdom)
“The night you attacked me” - Lauren Edwards (United Kingdom)

Children Winners

“Tinned Life” - Aurora B Blue (United States of America)
“Six ways to look at a word” - Maxwell Heavens (United Kingdom)
“Forgiveness for Forgiveness” - Kankai Walendra (India)

== Ledbury Poetry Festival Poetry Competition (2019) ==
Judge: Daljit Nagra

Adult Winners

“Duplex” - Elisabeth Murawski (United States of America)
“Bloodlines” - Sarah Wimbush (United Kingdom)
“Anatomy Theatre” - Denise Bundred (United Kingdom)

Young Persons Winners

“Planet Earth II: Cities” - Cia Mangat (United Kingdom)
“The People’s Republic of China” - Lydia Wei (United States of America/China)
“The Sound of Waiting” - Rose Brennan (United Kingdom)

Children Winners

“The Cat that nobody Wanted” - Aurora B Blue (United States of America)
“Imagine a world without any laws” - Maxwell Heavens (United Kingdom)
“Big Eats Small” - Han Fang (United Kingdom)

== Ledbury Poetry Festival Poetry Competition (2020) ==
Judge: Liz Berry

Winners: TBD
