= Charlie Baylis =

Nottingham-based English poet and editor (born 1987)

- Born: 1987 (age 38–39); Nottingham, England
- Education: Falmouth University; University of East Anglia
- Occupations: Poet; Editor
- Writing career
- Language: English
- Genres: Poetry; Criticism
- Notable work: a fondness for the colour green

Charlie Baylis (born 1987) is an English poet and editor from Nottingham. He is the founding editor of the poetry journal Anthropocene and author of a fondness for the colour green, published in 2023.

== Life ==
Baylis, who has briefly lived in Spain and is recognised for his "quirky and original poems", is a Falmouth University alumnus and a 2019 graduate of UEA's MA in Creative Writing (Poetry) programme. As of 2025, he is studying for a PhD in Spanish translation at the University of Nottingham.

== Work ==
Baylis is the author of seven pamphlets, including hilda doolittle's carl jung t-shirt (Erbacce) and Santa Lucía (Invisible Hand Press), and a full-length collection, a fondness for the colour green, published by Broken Sleep Books in 2023. His poems have appeared in Gutter, Magma, The Rialto, Agenda, Long Poem Magazine, The New Statesman, Confingo, and Poetry Wales. Excerpt from his poem 'Fifty Shades of Prufrock' featured in the Best New British and Irish Poets 2017 anthology, published by Eyewear Press. Baylis has received a nomination for the Forward Prize, several for the Pushcart Prize, and his Spanish translations have been commended in the Stephen Spender Prize.

He has also reviewed work frequently, often writing for such journals as The London Magazine, Ink Sweat & Tears, Wild Court and Stride. He has also edited Review 31, served as a flash fiction editor for Litro, and as assistant editor for Broken Sleep Books during its inception in 2018, and since 2020 as the indie press's editorial advisor. He was later replaced (as assistant editor for poetry) by the poet Stuart McPherson. In a 2018 interview, Aaron Kent, poet and founder of Broken Sleep Books, called Baylis "one of the best editors in the poetry game".

In 2019, while still at UEA, Baylis founded the poetry journal Anthropocene, inspired by the Oxford Word of the Year – "climate emergency" – in terms of naming.

Baylis's debut, Elizabeth (Agave Press, 2016), was published as a limited-edition pamphlet and released in the USA only. In a review published the same year, the poems in Elizabeth were praised for being "distinctly modern" and called "intriguing and enigmatic". Mark Waldron, one of the 2018 National Poetry Competition judges, included hilda doolittle's carl jung t-shirt in a set of books he called "varying degrees of astonishing in different ways." A review published in Stride noted the pamphlet for its "strong lyrical element to this poetry" and "a youthful, romantic quality". Another review suggested the titles to be the pamphlet's "weaknesses", with each "seeming very pleased with itself." Poet and critic Martin Stannard called Drag City, Baylis's third pamphlet which includes artwork by Hiromi Suzuki, "less interesting than it thinks it is." Another review noted swimming, Baylis's fourth pamphlet, for "soothing moments of lyrical reflection." His fifth, Santa Lucía, published with Invisible Hand Press in 2021, was praised for "a voice that combines romantic and surrealist imagery with existential and confessional tones", and for being "a short pamphlet with the depth of a full length project." In another review for the pamphlet, which Mike Ferguson called a "delightful poetic portrait of place", Alan Baker saw Baylis as a poet having "a clear conception of where he wants his poetry to go and a willingness" to lead it there.

He published his collaborative poetry pamphlet at first it felt like flying (with Andrew Taylor) in 2019, which was praised for its poems' "playful reciprocations", and debut full-length collection a fondness for the colour green in June 2023, his second with Broken Sleep Books. In a Buzz Magazine review, where his name is spelt with an extra 's' – Bayliss – the poems are marked for their "unpredictable inventiveness", calling the collection "anti-static; [since] everywhere, there is movement". In another review, Clark Allison looks at the poems in the collection as "objects out there in the world" and not as "polished still lives." Poet Rupert Loydell, in light of the magnitude of work published by Baylis before a fondness for the colour green, found it difficult to call it his debut. In his review, Loydell called Baylis "a kind of Peter Pan" and praised him for being "able to shed his miseries quickly and return to his happy place." Jayd Green called the series of 'Jenny' poems from the collection "incredibly playful" while also pointing to the act of constantly referencing "poets and media figures" as potentially "alienating" the reader. Eric Kennedy, writing for Review 31, also noted the closeness between "literary scenedom" and "celebrity fandom", questioning if it is "just another kind of parasocial relationship [often] produced in our media climate." In closing, he called a fondness for the colour green "a love letter posted in an old sock." Daniel Roy Connelly, in his review, says that to read Baylis is "to become one with the minutiae of the author's witty, sometimes-scabrous observations." In another review, published in The Madrid Review, the opening line of a fondness for the colour green is called "not a bad first line as first lines go", and a London Magazine review calls the collection's environment "emotionally uninhibited [and] graceful". Nathaniel King, another Broken Sleep Books poet, included Baylis's debut in his books of the year 2023. For Broken Sleep, Baylis has also edited several poetry anthologies, including the annual anthologies in 2018, 2021 and 2022.

In a Tumblr post titled 'An introduction to the post-epicurean psychedelic school of poetry', Baylis disapproved of "the commercialisation of [poetry as an] art form." In the same post, he introduced a school of poetry, the 'post-epicurean psychedelia', which is identified by "lyrical poetry with heady, intoxicating imagery and a focus on hedonistic living" and includes such writers as Jayant Kashyap, Maria Sledmere and Hera Lindsay Bird.

In 2025, after some issues online (potential cancellation, "fle[eing] to Spain"), Baylis's seventh pamphlet fuck poetry was published by Red Ceilings Press, which Paul Sutton, save the "tiresome use of lower case", called "a delight".

== Books ==
Baylis has published a total of seven pamphlets and a full-length collection. He has edited several anthologies for Broken Sleep Books.

=== Pamphlets ===
- Elizabeth (Agave Press, 2016)
- hilda doolittle's carl jung t-shirt (Erbacce, 2016) ISBN 9781907878831
- Drag City (with artwork by Hiromi Suzuki) (Broken Sleep Books, 2019) ISBN 9781726667630
- at first it felt like flying (in collaboration with Andrew Taylor) (Indigo Dreams Publishing, 2019) ISBN 9781910834992
- Swimming (The Red Ceilings Press, 2020)
- Santa Lucía (Invisible Hand Press, 2021)
- fuck poetry (The Red Ceilings Press, 2025)
- white flowers (Salò Press, 2026)

=== Collection ===
- a fondness for the colour green (Broken Sleep Books, 2023) ISBN 9781915760180

=== Anthologies ===
As editor (with Aaron Kent):

- Broken Sleep Books Anthology 2018 ISBN 9781790505579
- Broken Sleep Books 2021 Anthology ISBN 9781915079831
- Footprints: an anthology of new ecopoetry (Broken Sleep Books, 2022) ISBN 9781915079886
- Broken Sleep Books 2022 Anthology ISBN 9781915079770

== Awards ==
- 2024: Commended, Stephen Spender Prize.
