= Total gaseous mercury =

Total gaseous mercury is a measurement of mercury concentration used in toxicology.
