= Jennifer Wong =

Hong Kong writer and poet

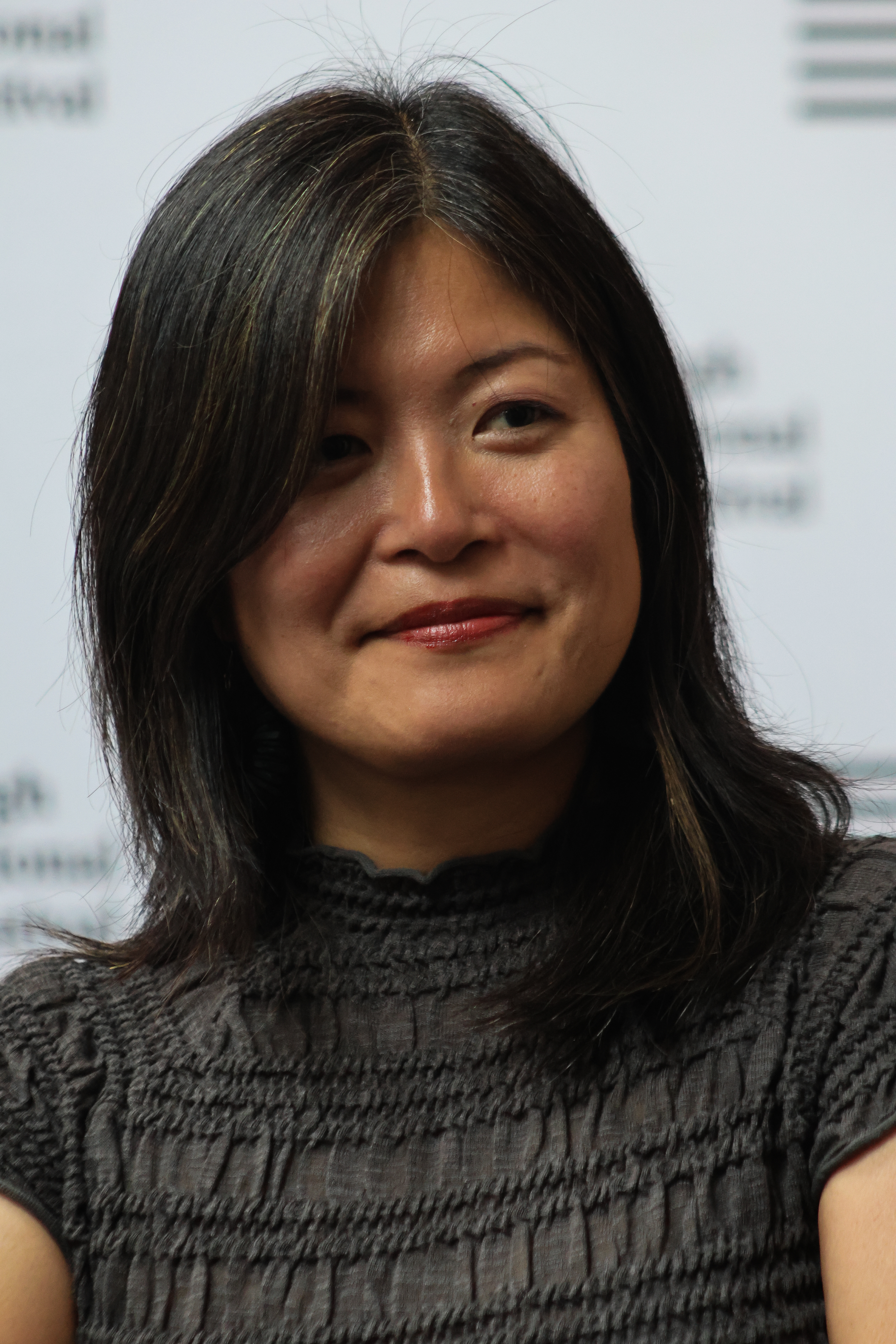
- Wong at Edinburgh Book Fest 26
- Occupation: Writer

Jennifer Wong is a woman poet and writer from Hong Kong.

== Biography ==
Wong studied English literature at Oxford University. She gained an MA in creative writing at the University of East Anglia and a PhD in creative writing at Oxford Brookes University. In 2005, she taught creative writing at the Chinese University of Hong Kong and worked as writer-in-residence at Lingnan University in 2012. Her first UK collection, Letters Home (Nine Arches Press 2020), which explores questions of migration, language, art and racial identities, was a Poetry Books Society Wild Card Choice.

Her writing has been included in Poetry London, Oxford Poetry, Wasafiri, Washington Square Review, The Scores, Magma Poetry, Tupelo Quarterly, Sinetheta, Oxonian Review, World Literature Today, Wildness, Asian Cha, Under the Radar and Lincoln Review.

She is the author of Identity, Home and Writing Elsewhere: Contemporary Chinese Diaspora Poetry published by Bloomsbury in 2023. Together with Eddie Tay, she co-edited the anthology State of Play: Poets of East and Southeast Asian Heritage in Conversation (Outspoken Press, 2023) featuring dialogues and correspondences between poets.

Together with Wasafiri, she co-curated a Poetics of Home Poetry Festival in 2021. She worked as a writer-in-residence with Wasafiri in 2021 and a visiting fellow for Oxford Research Centre in the Humanities (TORCH) in 2022. She has taught creative writing at Poetry School, City Lit, Oxford Brookes University and Arvon. In 2026 she was a visiting lecturer for the Department of Comparative Literature at the University of Hong Kong.

== Publications ==
Light Year (Nine Arches Press, 2026)

Woman, Mapped (Fly on the Wall Press, 2026). Editor

Time Difference (Verve, 2024)

Identity, Home and Writing Elsewhere in Contemporary Chinese Diaspora Poetry (Bloomsbury 2023)

Where Else: An International Hong Kong Poetry Anthology (Verve Poetry Press, 2023). Co-edited with Jason Eng Hun Lee and Tim Tim Cheng

State of Play: Poets of East and Southeast Asian Heritage in Conversation (Outspoken Press, 2023). Co-edited with Eddie Tay

Letters Home (Nine Arches Press 2020)

Diary of a Miu Miu Salesgirl (Bitter Melon Poetry, 2019)

Goldfish (Chameleon Press 2014)

Summer Cicadas (Chameleon Press 2006)
