= Ben Wilkinson (poet) =

British poet, academic and critic (born 1985)

- Born: 30 November 1985 (age 40); Stafford, England
- Education: University of Sheffield, Sheffield Hallam University
- Writing career
- Genres: Poetry, criticism

Ben Wilkinson (born 1985 in Stafford, England) is a British poet, academic, and critic for The Guardian. He completed his first degree at the University of Sheffield, and his MA and PhD at Sheffield Hallam University. In 2014, he won both the Poetry Business Book & Pamphlet Competition and a New Writing North Northern Writers' Award. He currently teaches creative writing at the University of Greater Manchester and lives in Sheffield, South Yorkshire. He is a keen amateur distance runner and has written variously on the subject.

== Works ==
=== Poetry ===
- The Sparks. Tall Lighthouse. 2008. ISBN 9781904551560.
- For Real. smith|doorstop books. 2014. ISBN 9781910367070.
- Way More Than Luck. Seren Books. 2018. ISBN 9781781724255.
- Same Difference. Seren Books. 2022. ISBN 9781781726488.

=== Edited volumes ===
- The Result is What You See Today: poems about running. smith|doorstop books. 2019. ISBN 9781912196814.

=== Criticism ===
- Don Paterson: Writers and their Work. Liverpool University Press. 2021. ISBN 9781800855373.

== Awards ==
- 2025: Arts Council England DYCP Grant
- 2018: Forward Prizes for Poetry (Highly Commended)
- 2015: Arts Council England Writer's Grant
- 2014: Poetry Business Book & Pamphlet Competition
- 2014: Northern Writers' Award
- 2010: Picador Poetry Prize (shortlist)

== Reviews ==
It's clear that the love of the beautiful game extends to Wilkinson's poetics, for he embraces a variety of forms and modes of address. From formally dexterous sonnets and sestinas, to epistles and endearing confessionalism, this is a book that likes to keep readers on their toes. Something Wilkinson does well is navigate the dark abyss of clinical depression [...] from "going about / the tedium that strings our lives / together: paperchain people, / baskets lined under strip-lights" ('To David Foster Wallace'), to shivering over a beige Cornish pasty, "ticking over / before some godforsaken motorway service station" ('You Must Be Joking'), there is tenderness and touching honesty to be found in the darker moments he describes. For this reason the collection's title is apt, for its scope reaches way beyond the boundaries of the football pitch and the fabled buzz of excitement, which rather serves as a backdrop against which the poet can stand and inspect the state of his own thumping heart. - Jade Cuttle, The Poetry Review

“I can’t make you feel what I felt” (David Foster Wallace), one of the epigraphs to Ben Wilkinson’s For Real, is a challenge to which Wilkinson rises with considerable success. His poems are like doors “where no door was bricked up”; they frequently make us wonder how he got through. The same is true of his translations, especially “October”, a fresh and convincing version of Verlaine. - Andrew McCullouch, The Times Literary Supplement

Whenever I read Ben Wilkinson’s work I find myself admiring his craft. It carries a precision of thought and expression that's hard to reproduce, in a syntax which is natural and a voice which is easy to hear, yet the poems abound with subtly used devices and effects. Wilkinson disguises his full-rhymes with enjambment, so the audience experience both form and ‘natural flow’ at the same time. He’s always conscious of form, but rarely lets form dictate to him. - Noel Williams, Antiphon
