= Acumen (magazine) =

British literary magazine

- May 2010 cover
- Editor: Danielle Hope
- Categories: Poetry magazine
- Frequency: Triannual
- Publisher: Acumen Publications
- Founder: Patricia Oxley
- Founded: 1985
- Country: United Kingdom
- Based in: London
- Language: English
- Website: Acumen
- ISSN: 0964-0304
- OCLC: 15725310

Acumen is a triannual British literary magazine with special emphasis on poetry and is based in London, the United Kingdom. According to Stephen May it is considered a leading poetry magazine.

== History and profile ==
Acumen began publication in 1985. The magazine, headquartered in Brixham, was founded by Patricia Oxley, who was also its editor until issue 100 in May 2021 when Danielle Hope replaced her in the post. Her husband William Oxley was its treasurer and interviews editor. The journal is published by Acumen Publications three times a year and covers poems by both famous and lesser known poets and reviews of poems. The magazine was formerly headquartered in Brixham before its head office was moved to London.

The magazine hosts an international poetry competition. Past co-editors of Acumen with Oxley include Anne Stevenson and Evangeline Paterson. The book British Poetry Magazines, 1914-2000 states that Acumen has "been very deliberately concerned with the notion of an independent approach to poetry, though at the same time tending to avoid experimentalism." The magazine was one publication studied in Chapman literary magazine's August 1997 issue entitled The State of British Poetry.
