= Zaffar Kunial =

English poet

- Born: Birmingham, England
- Education: London School of Economics

Zaffar Kunial is an English poet, essayist and academic. He has received a number of accolades for his work, including the Geoffrey Dearmer Prize and a Windham–Campbell Literature Prize.

== Early life ==
Kunial was born in Birmingham to an English mother and a Kashmiri father. He graduated from the London School of Economics. He later took evening classes with Michael Donaghy at City, University of London.

== Career ==
Kunial's entry "Hill Speak" came third in the 2011 National Poetry Competition. He won the 2013 Northern Writers' Award. In 2024, three of his poems won him the Geoffrey Dearmer Prize. His debut pamphlet was part of the 2014 Faber New Poets series.

Kunial reunited with Faber & Faber for the publication of his debut poetry collection Us in 2018. Us was shortlisted for the T. S. Eliot Prize and the Costa Book Award for Poetry. This was followed by Kunial's pamphlet Six in 2019.

From 2019 to 2021, Kunial was a Douglas Caster Cultural Fellow of the University of Leeds. Also in 2019, he was appointed Writer-in-Residence at the Brontë Parsonage Museum.

Kunial's second collection England's Green was published in 2022. That year, Kunial won the Windham–Campbell Literature Prize for Poetry. England's Green won a Ledbury Hellens Poetry Prize, received the Laurel Prize for Poetry's second place, and was shortlisted for the T. S. Eliot Prize, Rathbones Folio Prize and the Ondaatje Prize.

In 2023, Kunial served as Laureate of the Durham Book Festival.

== Personal life ==
Kunial lives in Hebden Bridge, Yorkshire.

== Bibliography ==
=== Collections ===
- Us (2018)
- England's Green (2022)

=== Pamphlets ===
- Zaffar Kunial: Faber New Poets 11 (2014)
- Six (2019)

=== Select contributions ===
- The Shape Remembrance Takes, 5 poems in The Pity (2014)
- "Laburnum Time", essay in Arboreal (2016)
- in Nature Matters: Vital Poems from the Global Majority (2025), edited by Mona Arshi and Karen McCarthy Woolf

== Accolades ==
Year	Award	Category	Title	Result	Ref.
2011	National Poetry Competition		"Hill Speak"	Third	
2013	Northern Writers' Award			Won	
2014	Geoffrey Dearmer Prize		"The Word", "Q", "The Fielder"	Won	
2018	T. S. Eliot Prize		Us	Shortlisted	
2018	Costa Book Awards	Poetry	Us	Shortlisted	
2022	Windham–Campbell Literature Prizes	Poetry		Won	
2023	T. S. Eliot Prize		England's Green	Shortlisted	
2023	Rathbones Folio Prize		England's Green	Shortlisted	
2023	Royal Society of Literature Ondaatje Prize		England's Green	Shortlisted	
2023	Laurel Prize for Poetry		England's Green	Second	
2023	Ledbury Hellens Poetry Prize	Second Collections	England's Green	Won	
