= Liz Berry (poet) =

British poet

- Born: 1980 (age 45–46); West Midlands, England
- Education: Royal Holloway, University of London
- Occupation: Poet
- Writing career
- Language: English
- Genre: Poetry
- Notable works: Black Country (2014); The Republic of Motherhood (2018)
- Notable awards: Eric Gregory Award (2009); Forward Prize (2014); Somerset Maugham Award (2015)

Signature
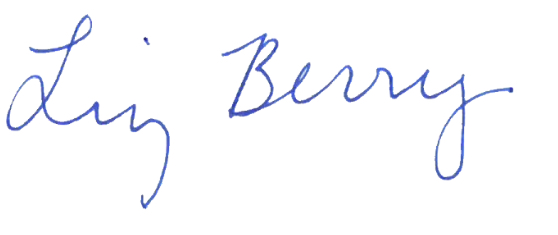

Liz Berry (born 1980) is a British poet. She has published three pamphlets and two full-length poetry collections. Her debut collection, Black Country (2014), was named poetry book of the year by several publications, including The Guardian.

== Early life and education ==
Born in 1980, Berry was raised in the Black Country of England. She trained as a school teacher and initially taught in a primary school. She became interested in poetry after taking a beginners' poetry class at a local college. She later attended the Royal Holloway, University of London, where she earned an MA in Creative Writing.

== Poetry career ==
Berry was a recipient of the Eric Gregory Award in 2009. The award is given by the Society of Authors to British poets under the age of 30. Berry's first pamphlet, The Patron Saint of School Girls, was published by tall-lighthouse in 2010. She won the Poetry London competition in 2012 for the poem Bird.

In 2014, Chatto and Windus published Black Country, Berry's first poetry collection. Black Country won the Forward Prize for Best First Collection, the Geoffrey Faber Memorial Prize, and the Somerset Maugham Award. Black Country was selected as poetry book of the year by several publications, including The Guardian.

The Republic of Motherhood, Berry's second pamphlet, was published by Chatto and Windus in 2018. The title poem won the Forward Prize for Best Single Poem.

Following, The Republic of Motherhood, Berry collaborated with Black Country artist Tom Hicks on The Dereliction (Hercules Editions, 2021), a pamphlet of poems and photographs exploring their home region.

In 2023, Chatto and Windus published The Home Child, a novel in verse, which reimagines the story of Berry's great aunt, Eliza Showell, one of the many children forcibly migrated to Canada as part of the British Child Migrant Schemes. The Home Child was adapted for BBC Radio 4 as "The Ballad of Eliza Showell" and was a Radio Pick of The Week for The Guardian, The Times, The Telegraph, and Radio Times. The Home Child was awarded The Writers' Prize for Book of the Year.

Berry's writing is rooted in the landscape and dialect of the West Midlands. In 2014, Ben Wilkinson in The Guardian summarized Black Country: "It digs deep into the poet’s West Midlands roots, enlivening and reimagining the heritage of that eponymous heartland of iron foundries, coal mines and steel mills, on both personal and public footings". Her poem 'Homing', a love poem to the language of the Black Country, became part of the AQA GCSE syllabus in 2023.

Berry lives in Birmingham with her family. She is a patron of Writing West Midlands and in 2023 she was made an Honorary Doctor of Letters by The University of Wolverhampton.

== Awards ==
Awards and Nominations
Year	Title	Award	Category	Result	Ref
2009	—	Eric Gregory Award	—	Won	
2012	—	Poetry London competition	—	Won	
2014	Black Country	Forward Prizes for Poetry	First Collection	Won	
2014	Black Country	Geoffrey Faber Memorial Prize	—	Won	
2015	Black Country	Somerset Maugham Award	—	Won	
2018	Republic of Motherhood	Forward Prizes for Poetry	Single Poem	Won	
2024	The Home Child	The Writers' Prize	Poetry	Won	
2024	The Home Child	The Writers' Prize	Overall	Won	

== Works ==
- —— (2010). The Patron Saint of Girls. tall-lighthouse. ISBN 9781904551829.
- —— (2014). Black Country. Chatto and Windus. ISBN 9780701188573.
- —— (2018). The Republic of Motherhood. Vintage Digital. ASIN B07CN8RDS1.
- ——; Hicks, Tom (2021). The Dereliction. Hercules Editions.
- —— (2023). The Home Child. Chatto & Windus. ISBN 9781784742683.
