= New Writing North =

Organisation supporting writers in the North of England

New Writing North, set up in 1996, is an Arts Council England agency based in the North of England to support writers in the region.

== History ==
New Writing North was established in 1996 in Newcastle upon Tyne, working with writers across the North East of England. In 2012 the agency became part of Arts Council England's National Portfolio programme and expanded its remit to cover the whole of the North of England. New Writing North is a registered charity and a limited company.

New Writing North commissioned four poets to commemorate poet Andrew Waterhouse after his death in 2001, including "Song for the Crossing" by Sean O'Brien. The poems were set to music by Newcastle-based composer and musician Keith Morris.

In 2025, the organisation set up a programme, The Bee, to support working-class writers in the United Kingdom. The Bee includes a podcast, magazine and online resources.
