= The Poetry Society =

British membership organisation

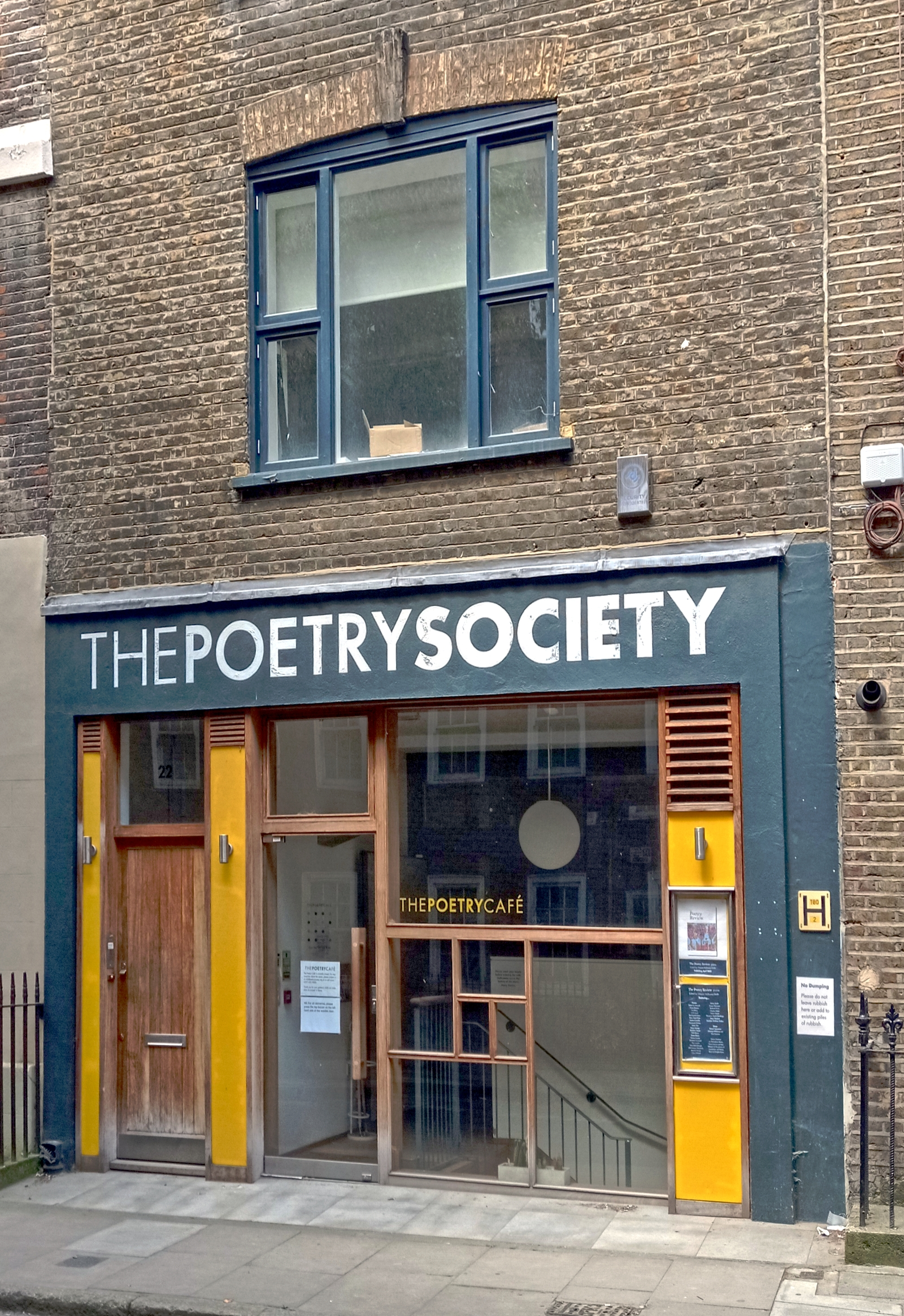
- Formation: 1909; 117 years ago
- Type: Membership organisation
- Headquarters: Betterton Street, Covent Garden, London, England, United Kingdom
- Publication: Poetry Review
- Website: poetrysociety.org.uk
- Formerly called: Poetry Recital Society

The Poetry Society is a membership organisation, open to all, whose stated aim is "to promote the study, use and enjoyment of poetry". The society was founded in London in February 1909 as the Poetry Recital Society, becoming the Poetry Society in 1912. Its first president was Lady Margaret Sackville.

From its current premises in Covent Garden, London, The Poetry Society publishes The Poetry Review, a poetry magazine. Established in 1912, its current editor is the poet Wayne Holloway-Smith, who succeeded Emily Berry in 2023. Berry herself succeeded Maurice Riordan in 2017. Fiona Sampson was the magazine's editor from 2005 to 2012.

In 2011, "with the help of some initial funding from Arts Council England's Poetry & Young People Project", the poet Holly Hopkins helped set up the Young Poets Network arm of the society, which now focusses on supporting poets "up to the age of 25." The poet Jayant Kashyap called it "the best place for young poets based anywhere in the world."

== Current Leadership ==
President: Roger McGough
Vice Presidents: Simon Armitage, Carol Ann Duffy, Ian McMillan (poet), and Hugo Williams.

== Past Presidents and Associated Poets ==
Past presidents and key affiliated figures of the UK Poetry Society include:
Lady Margaret Sackville (First President)
Dannie Abse,
Basil Bunting,
John Heath-Stubbs,
Paul Muldoon,
William Plomer,
Ronald Ross,
Jo Shapcott

== Awards ==
The society organises several competitions, including the British National Poetry Competition, the Foyle Young Poets of the Year Award, The Popescu Prize, The Ted Hughes Award for New Work in Poetry and the Geoffrey Dearmer Award. The society also ran the Alice Hunt Bartlett Prize from 1986 to 1997.
