= Michael Marks Awards for Poetry Pamphlets =

UK literary award

The Michael Marks Awards for Poetry Pamphlets are annual awards for pamphlets published in the UK. The awards aim to promote the pamphlet form and to enable poets and publishers to develop and continue creating. Since their inception, they have grown to include three annual awards, for "Poetry Pamphlet", "Publisher" and "Illustration", carrying prizes of up to £5,000, and awarding places on "The Michael Marks Poets in Residence Program" in Greece. Additional awards have included the "Poetry Pamphlet in a Celtic Language" and, as of 2022, the Environmental Poet of the Year prize.

The awards were founded in 2009 by the Michael Marks Charitable Trust, in a collaboration with the British Library that continues to this day. They are funded entirely by the Michael Marks Charitable Trust, and are enabled through partnerships between the British Library, the Wordsworth Trust, The TLS and the Harvard Center for Hellenic Studies, and in association with the National Library of Wales and the National Library of Scotland. As of 2012, the awards have been administered by Wordsworth Trust. The Michael Marks Charitable Trust was established in 1966 by the late Lord Marks, 2nd Baron of Broughton. Both awards carry a prize of £5,000.

The Nobel laureate Seamus Heaney praised the prize's establishment:

These inspired awards recognise that the pamphlet has a fundamental importance in literary culture far exceeding anything suggested by the dictionary – "a brief publication, generally having a paper cover". For many of the best poets now writing it was not only their first means of distribution but the first ratification of their gift."

== Winners and nominees ==
The award recognises an outstanding work of poetry published in pamphlet form – defined by the Awards as containing no more than 36 pages – in the UK.

The following is a list of shortlisted pamphlets. Winners are listed in yellow, first in their year.

Year	Author	Title	Publisher	Ref(s)	Judges
2009	Elizabeth Burns	The Shortest Days	Galdragon Press		Ian McMillan; Jackie Kay; Richard Price
2009	Polly Atkin	Bone Song	Aussteiger Publications		Ian McMillan; Jackie Kay; Richard Price
2009	Siobhán Campbell	That Water Speaks in Tongues	Templar Poetry		Ian McMillan; Jackie Kay; Richard Price
2009	Sarah Jackson	Milk	Pighog Press		Ian McMillan; Jackie Kay; Richard Price
2009	Kate Potts	Whichever music	Tall Lighthouse		Ian McMillan; Jackie Kay; Richard Price
2009	seekers of lice	quot	self-published		Ian McMillan; Jackie Kay; Richard Price
2010	Selima Hill	Advice on Wearing Animal Prints	Flarestack Poets		Ali Smith; Jo Shapcott; Richard Price
2010	Tom Chivers	The Terrors	Nine Arches Press		Ali Smith; Jo Shapcott; Richard Price
2010	David Hart	The Titanic Café closes its doors and hits the rocks	Nine Arches Press		Ali Smith; Jo Shapcott; Richard Price
2010	Hugh McMillan	Devorgilla's Bridge	Roncadora Press		Ali Smith; Jo Shapcott; Richard Price
2010	Richard Moorhead	The Reluctant Vegetarian	Oystercatcher Press		Ali Smith; Jo Shapcott; Richard Price
2010	Nii Ayikwei Parkes	ballast: a remix	Tall Lighthouse		Ali Smith; Jo Shapcott; Richard Price
2011	James McGonigall	Cloud Pibroch	Mariscat		Lavinia Greenlaw; Robert Hampson; Richard Price
2011	Neil Addison	Apocapulco	Salt Publishing		Lavinia Greenlaw; Robert Hampson; Richard Price
2011	Simon Armitage	The Motorway Service Station as a Destination in its Own Right	Smith/Doorstop		Lavinia Greenlaw; Robert Hampson; Richard Price
2011	Sean Burn	mo thunder	The Knives, Forks and Spoons Press		Lavinia Greenlaw; Robert Hampson; Richard Price
2011	Olive Broderick	Darkhaired	Templar Poetry		Lavinia Greenlaw; Robert Hampson; Richard Price
2011	Ralph Hawkins	Happy Whale Fat Smile	Oystercatcher Press		Lavinia Greenlaw; Robert Hampson; Richard Price
2012	Róisín Tierney	Dream Endings	Rack Press		Alan Jenkins; Tanya Kirk; Carola Luther
2012	Paul Bentley	Largo	Smith/Doorstop		Alan Jenkins; Tanya Kirk; Carola Luther
2012	Douglas Dunn	Invisible Ink	Mariscat Press		Alan Jenkins; Tanya Kirk; Carola Luther
2012	Charlotte Gann	The Long Woman	Pighog Press		Alan Jenkins; Tanya Kirk; Carola Luther
2012	Maitreyabandhu	The Bond	Smith/Doorstop		Alan Jenkins; Tanya Kirk; Carola Luther
2013	David Clarke	Gaud	Flarestack Poets		Tanya Kirk; Thea Lenarduzzi; Judy Brown
2013	Kim Lasky	Petrol Cyan Electric	Smith/Doorstop		Tanya Kirk; Thea Lenarduzzi; Judy Brown
2013	Kim Moore	If We Could Speak Like Wolves	Smith/Doorstop		Tanya Kirk; Thea Lenarduzzi; Judy Brown
2013	Ben Parker	The Escape Artists	Tall Lighthouse		Tanya Kirk; Thea Lenarduzzi; Judy Brown
2013	Neil Rollinson	Talking Dead	Aussteiger Publications		Tanya Kirk; Thea Lenarduzzi; Judy Brown
2013	Chrissy Williams	Flying into the Bear	HappenStance Press		Tanya Kirk; Thea Lenarduzzi; Judy Brown
2014	Laura Scott	What I Saw	The Rialto (poetry magazine)		Zaffar Kunial; Tanya Kirk; Andrew McCulloch
2014	Christine de Luca	Dat Trickster Sun	Mariscat Press		Zaffar Kunial; Tanya Kirk; Andrew McCulloch
2014	Mimi Khalvati	Earthshine	Smith/Doorstop		Zaffar Kunial; Tanya Kirk; Andrew McCulloch
2014	Ian McMillan	Jazz Peas	Smith/Doorstop		Zaffar Kunial; Tanya Kirk; Andrew McCulloch
2014	Richard Moorhead	The Word Museum	Flarestack Poets		Zaffar Kunial; Tanya Kirk; Andrew McCulloch
2014	Samantha Wynne-Rhyderrch	Lime and Winter	Rack Press		Zaffar Kunial; Tanya Kirk; Andrew McCulloch
2015	Gill McEvoy	The First Telling	HappenStance Press		Debbie Cox; Helen Mort; Rory Waterman
2015	Alan Jenkins	Clutag Five Poems Series No. 2	Clutag Press		Debbie Cox; Helen Mort; Rory Waterman
2015	Anja Konig	Advice for an Only Child	flipped eye publishing (flap pamphlet series)		Debbie Cox; Helen Mort; Rory Waterman
2015	Peter Riley	The Ascent of Kinder Scout	Longbarrow Press		Debbie Cox; Helen Mort; Rory Waterman
2015	David Tait	Three Dragon Day	Smith/Doorstop		Debbie Cox; Helen Mort; Rory Waterman
2016	Richard Scott	Wound	The Rialto		Lavinia Greenlaw; Robert Hampson; Richard Price
2016	Polly Clark	A Handbook for the Afterlife.	Templar Poetry		Lavinia Greenlaw; Robert Hampson; Richard Price
2016	Fiona Moore	Night Letter	HappenStance Press		Lavinia Greenlaw; Robert Hampson; Richard Price
2016	Camille Ralphs	Malkin	Emma Press		Lavinia Greenlaw; Robert Hampson; Richard Price
2016	Lizzi Thistlethwayte	Angels and Other Diptera	Water Flag Press		Lavinia Greenlaw; Robert Hampson; Richard Price
2017	Charlotte Wetton	I Refuse to Turn into a Hatstand	Calder Valley Press.		Leaf Arbuthnot; Phil Hatfield; Ruth Padel; Sir Nicholas Penny
2017	Natacha Bryan	If I Talked Everything my Eyes Saw.	Gatehouse Press Lighthouse.		Leaf Arbuthnot; Phil Hatfield; Ruth Padel; Sir Nicholas Penny
2017	Alyson Hallett	Toots	Mariscat Press		Leaf Arbuthnot; Phil Hatfield; Ruth Padel; Sir Nicholas Penny
2017	Theophilus Kwek	The First Five Storms	Smith/Doorstop		Leaf Arbuthnot; Phil Hatfield; Ruth Padel; Sir Nicholas Penny
2017	Phoebe Stuckes	Gin & Tonic	Smith/Doorstop		Leaf Arbuthnot; Phil Hatfield; Ruth Padel; Sir Nicholas Penny
2018	Carol Rumens	Bezdelki	The Emma Press		
2018	Gina Wilson	It Was and It Wasn't	Mariscat Press		
2018	Rakhshan Rizwan	Paisley	The Emma Press		
2018	Ian Parks	If Possible (Cavafy Poems)	Calder Valley Poetry		
2018	Liz Berry	The Republic of Motherhood	Chatto & Windus		
2019	Rowan Evans	The last verses of Beccán	Guillemot Press		
2019	Seán Hewitt	Lantern	Offord Road Books		
2019	Anita Pati	Dodo provocateur	The Rialto		
2019	Declan Ryan	Fighters, losers	New Walk Editions		
2019	Morgan Owen	moroedd/dŵr	Cyhoeddiadau'r Stamp		
2020	Paul Muldoon	Binge	The Lifeboat		
2020	Gail McConnell	Fothermather	Ink Sweat and Tears Press		
2020	Jamie McKendrick	The years	Arc Publications		
2020	Sarah Wimbush	Bloodlines	Seren		
2020	Alycia Pirmohamed	Hinge	ignitionpress		
2020	Rhys Iowerth	Carthen denau	Cyhoeddiadau'r Stamp		
2021	Gboyega Odubanjo	Aunty uncle poems	The Poetry Business		Julia Copus; André Naffis-Sahely; Manuela Pellegrino
2021	Fiona Benson	Ariadne	Broken Sleep Books		Julia Copus; André Naffis-Sahely; Manuela Pellegrino
2021	Holly Singlehurst	The sky turned thick as honey	The Rialto		Julia Copus; André Naffis-Sahely; Manuela Pellegrino
2021	Matthew Hollis	Leaves	Hazel Press		Julia Copus; André Naffis-Sahely; Manuela Pellegrino
2021	Selima Hill	Fridge	The Rialto		Julia Copus; André Naffis-Sahely; Manuela Pellegrino
2021	Hugo Williams	Badlands	Mariscat Press		Julia Copus; André Naffis-Sahely; Manuela Pellegrino
2021	Leontia Flynn	Nina Simone is singing	Mariscat Press		Julia Copus; André Naffis-Sahely; Manuela Pellegrino
2022	Shane McCrae	Hex and Other Poems	Bad Betty Press		John Glenday; Stephanie Sy-Quia; Natasha Bershadsky; Giulia Carla Rossi
2022	Naush Sabah	Litanies	Guillemot Press		John Glenday; Stephanie Sy-Quia; Natasha Bershadsky; Giulia Carla Rossi
2022	Maya C Popa	Dear Life	Smith/Doorstop		John Glenday; Stephanie Sy-Quia; Natasha Bershadsky; Giulia Carla Rossi
2022	Matthew Haigh	Vampires	Bad Betty Press		John Glenday; Stephanie Sy-Quia; Natasha Bershadsky; Giulia Carla Rossi
2022	Tomi Adegbayibi	Colours & Tea (Human)	Muscaliet Press		John Glenday; Stephanie Sy-Quia; Natasha Bershadsky; Giulia Carla Rossi
2022	John Burnside	Apostasy	Dare-Gale Press		John Glenday; Stephanie Sy-Quia; Natasha Bershadsky; Giulia Carla Rossi

- 2016 shortlist announcement. Winner announcement. Wound, by Richard Scott.
- 2017 shortlist announcement. Winner announcement. I Refuse to Turn into a Hatstand, by Charlotte Wetton.

== Michael Marks Publishers' Award ==
The Michael Marks Publishers' Award recognises an outstanding UK publisher of poetry in pamphlet form.

The following is a list of shortlisted publishers. Winners are listed in yellow, first in their year.

Year	Publisher	Ref(s)	Judges
2009	Oystercatcher Press		Ian McMillan; Jackie Kay; Richard Price
2009	HappenStance Press		Ian McMillan; Jackie Kay; Richard Price
2009	Tall Lighthouse		Ian McMillan; Jackie Kay; Richard Price
2009	Templar Poetry		Ian McMillan; Jackie Kay; Richard Price
2010	HappenStance Press		Ali Smith; Jo Shapcott; Richard Price
2010	Oystercatcher Press		Ali Smith; Jo Shapcott; Richard Price
2010	Templar Poetry		Ali Smith; Jo Shapcott; Richard Price
2010	Veer Books		Ali Smith; Jo Shapcott; Richard Price
2011	Crater Press		Lavinia Greenlaw; Richard Hampson; Richard Price
2011	Kater Murr's Press		Lavinia Greenlaw; Richard Hampson; Richard Price
2011	The Knives, Forks and Spoons Press		Lavinia Greenlaw; Richard Hampson; Richard Price
2011	Mariscat Press		Lavinia Greenlaw; Richard Hampson; Richard Price
2011	Roncadora Press		Lavinia Greenlaw; Richard Hampson; Richard Price
2012	Smith/Doorstop		Alan Jenkins; Tanya Kirk; Carola Luther
2012	Donut Press		Alan Jenkins; Tanya Kirk; Carola Luther
2012	Pighog Press		Alan Jenkins; Tanya Kirk; Carola Luther
2012	Rack Press		Alan Jenkins; Tanya Kirk; Carola Luther
2013	Flarestack Poets		Tanya Kirk; Thea Lenarduzzi; Judy Brown
2013	Mariscat Press		Tanya Kirk; Thea Lenarduzzi; Judy Brown
2013	Rack Press		Tanya Kirk; Thea Lenarduzzi; Judy Brown
2013	Pighog Press		Tanya Kirk; Thea Lenarduzzi; Judy Brown
2013	Shearsman Books		Tanya Kirk; Thea Lenarduzzi; Judy Brown
2014	Rack Press		Zaffar Kunial; Tanya Kirk; Andrew McCulloch
2014	Emma Press		Zaffar Kunial; Tanya Kirk; Andrew McCulloch
2014	flipped eye publishing		Zaffar Kunial; Tanya Kirk; Andrew McCulloch
2014	Smith/Doorstop		Zaffar Kunial; Tanya Kirk; Andrew McCulloch
2014	Shearsman Books		Zaffar Kunial; Tanya Kirk; Andrew McCulloch
2015	Mariscat Press		Debbie Cox; Helen Mort; Rory Waterman
2015	Eyewear Publishing		Debbie Cox; Helen Mort; Rory Waterman
2015	Smith/Doorstop		Debbie Cox; Helen Mort; Rory Waterman
2015	The Emma Press		Debbie Cox; Helen Mort; Rory Waterman

== Award for Poetry in a Celtic Language ==
In 2019, the inaugural Michael Marks Award for Poetry in a Celtic Language was awarded to Morgan Owen for his pamphlet moroedd/dŵr, published by Cyhoeddiadau'r Stamp.

== Michael Marks Award for Environmental Poet of the Year ==
This was inaugurated 2022-23 and recognises an outstanding UK poetry in pamphlet form about climate change, its effects and what to do about it. There is one award each year. They have been:

- 2022-23: Linda France for Letters to Katłįà published by The Wordsworth Trust.
- 2023-24: Jane Burn with A Thousand Miles from the Sea
- 2024-25: Ben Verinder with How to save a river.
