= Next Generation poets (2004) =

The Next Generation poets are a list of young and middle-aged figures from British poetry, mostly British, compiled by a panel for the Poetry Book Society in 2004. This is a promotional exercise, and a sequel to the New Generation poets (1994). The "Next Generation" was followed by Staple magazine's "Alternative Generation" (2005), which selected a group of poets from the UK's small-press output. The Next Generation 2004 list comprises:

- Patience Agbabi
- Amanda Dalton
- Nick Drake
- Jane Draycott
- Paul Farley
- Leontia Flynn
- Matthew Francis
- Sophie Hannah
- Tobias Hill
- Gwyneth Lewis
- Alice Oswald
- Pascale Petit
- Jacob Polley
- Deryn Rees-Jones
- Maurice Riordan
- Robin Robertson
- Owen Sheers
- Henry Shukman
- Catherine Smith
- Jean Sprackland

== See also ==
- New Generation poets (1994)
- Next Generation poets (2014)
