= Patience Agbabi =

British poet and performer (born 1965)

Patience Agbabi FRSL
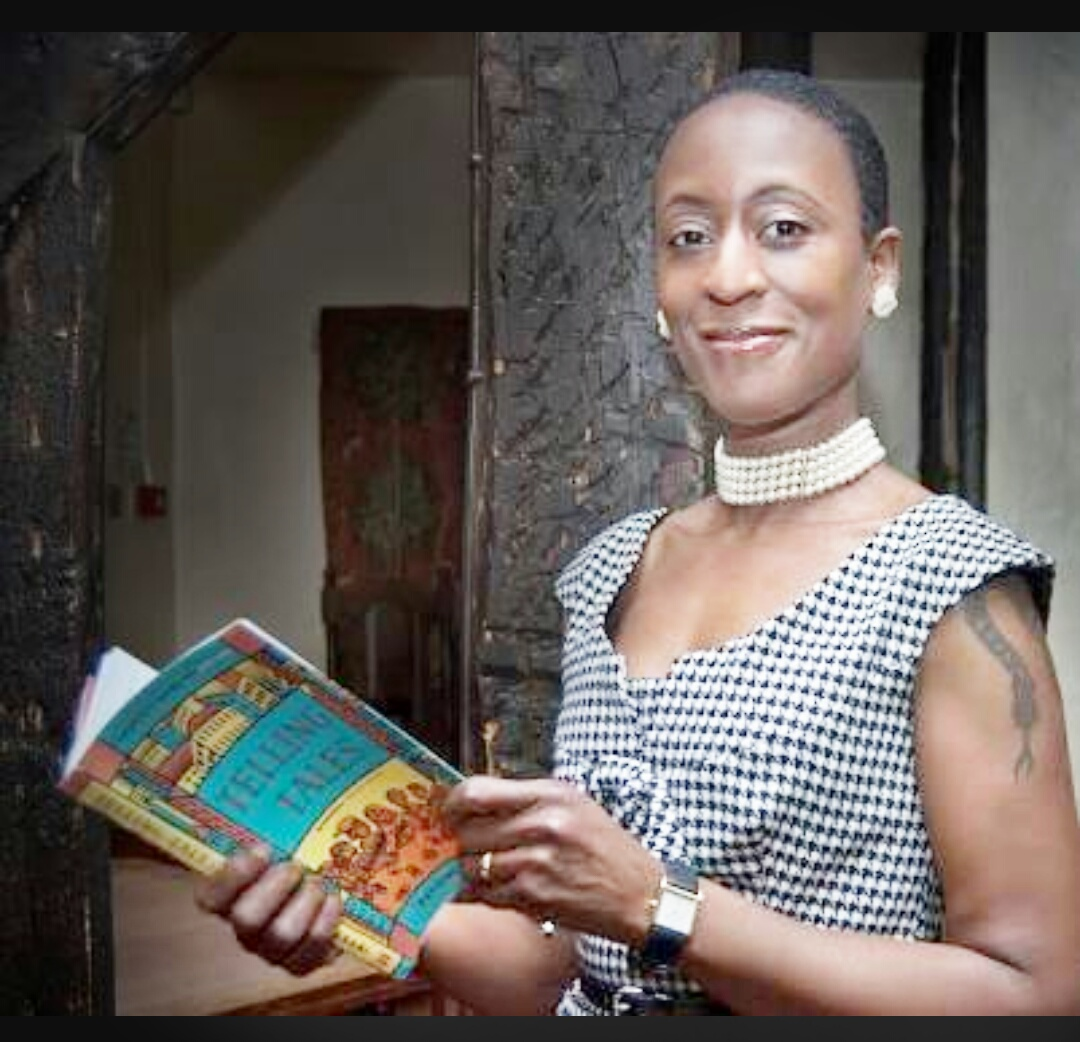
- Born: 1965 (age 60–61); London, England
- Education: Pembroke College, Oxford; University of Sussex
- Occupations: Poet and performer

Patience Agbabi FRSL (born 1965) is a British poet and performer who emphasizes the spoken word. Although her poetry addresses contemporary themes, it often makes use of formal constraints, including traditional poetic forms. She has described herself as "bicultural" and bisexual. Issues of racial and gender identity feature in her poetry. She is celebrated "for paying equal homage to literature and performance" and for work that "moves fluidly and nimbly between cultures, dialects, voices; between page and stage." In 2017, she was elected a Fellow of the Royal Society of Literature (FRSL).

== Early life and education ==
Patience Agbabi was born in London to Nigerian parents. From a young age, she was privately fostered by a white English family and moved at the age of 12 from Sussex to North Wales, where she was then raised in Colwyn Bay. She studied English language and literature at Pembroke College, Oxford.

She earned an MA in Creative Writing, the Arts and Education from the University of Sussex in 2002, and in September that year was appointed Associate Creative Writing Lecturer at the University of Wales, Cardiff.

== Poetry and performances ==
Agbabi began performing on the London club circuit in 1995 as a member of the performance group Atomic Lip, which was once described as "poetry's first pop group." Their final tour occurred in 1998, titled "Quadrophonix," which mixed live and video performance in each show. In 1996, she worked on a performance piece called FO(U)R WOMEN, with Adeola Agbebiyi and Dorothea Smartt, first performed at the Institute of Contemporary Arts and touring from 1995 to 1998. She has cited among her influences Janis Joplin, Carol Ann Duffy, Chaucer, and various aspects of contemporary music and culture. Agbabi's childhood love of cake is apparent in her poem "Eat Me".

The poems in her first book R.A.W., published in 1995, focus on her experiences regarding Thatcherism, urban life, and racial and sexual politics. The style of these poems "owe much to the rhythms, verbal and associational genius of rap". Her next collection was Transformatrix (2000), a commentary on contemporary Britain that draws inspiration from popular music forms. "Transformatix" also contains Agbabi's first published adaptation of Geoffrey Chaucer's The Canterbury Tales, reimagining the Wife of Bath as the Nigerian "Mrs. Alice Ebi Bafa". In 2008, Agbabi published Bloodshot Monochrome, a collection that, as described by one reviewer, highlights social and political issues, captures and considers moments in time through long-dead authors, and offers readers a diverse sampling of the author's views of life in a variety of places." Carol Rumens has said: "Agbabi characteristically makes poetry an opportunity for conversation with the past, not swamping it but setting new lexical terms."

As Canterbury Laureate from July 2009 to December 2010, Agbabi received an Arts Council grant to write a full-length poetry collection based on Geoffrey Chaucer's The Canterbury Tales. The final product was published in 2014 as Telling Tales, which retold each tale in the Middle-English work to offer a 21st-century take on the characters, its poetry and its performance elements. The reinterpretation used her critically acclaimed, lyrical poetic style to newly define British literary traditions. The book met with praise from poets including Simon Armitage, who described it as "the liveliest versions of Chaucer you're likely to read." Agbabi continues to tour Telling Tales as a performance-poetry production shown at literature festivals, arts spaces and libraries across the UK. She performed tales such as "The Wife of Bafa" or "Tit for Tat (Reeves's tale)".

As well as performing in Britain, Agbabi undertook British Council reading tours of Namibia, the Czech Republic, Zimbabwe, Germany and Switzerland. She took part in Modern Love, a spoken-word tour produced by Renaissance One, which explored love and modern relationships, touring the UK and Switzerland.

Her poetry has featured on television and radio, including the Channel 4 series Litpop in 1998 and on the children's programme Blue Peter in 1999. She has also been a contributor to several anthologies, among them Jubilee Lines (2012), edited by Carol Ann Duffy, which marked Queen Elizabeth II's 60th anniversary on the throne, and Refugee Tales (2016), a collection of stories based on accounts by Gatwick airport detainees.

She has taught and run workshops and also been poet-in-residence at various places, ranging from Oxford Brookes University and Eton College to a London tattoo and piercing studio.

In 2018, she was writer in residence at the Brontë Parsonage Museum.

== Awards and recognition ==
In 1997, Agbabi's first poetry collection, R.A.W (1995), received the Excelle Literary Award.

In 2000, she was one of 10 poets commissioned by BBC Radio 4 to write a poem for National Poetry Day.

In 2004, she featured on the Poetry Book Society list of Next Generation poets.

In 2010, Agbabi was appointed as the Canterbury Festival's Canterbury Poet Laureate.

In March 2015, The Poetry Society announced Agbabi as one of five poets shortlisted for the 2014 Ted Hughes Award for New Work in Poetry, for her book Telling Tales.

In 2017, Agbabi was elected as a Fellow of the Royal Society of Literature.

== Selected works ==
- R.A.W., Gecko Press (1995).
- Transformatrix, Canongate Books (2000)
- Bloodshot Monochrome, Canongate (2008)
- Telling Tales, Canongate (2014)
- The Wife of Bafa (text); Analysis of The Wife of Bafa
- The Infinite, Canongate (2020)

=== Anthologies ===
- Carol Ann Duffy, ed., Jubilee Lines (London: Faber & Faber, 2012)
- Sasha Dugdale, ed., Best British Poetry 2012 (Cromer: Salt, 2012)
- Helen Ivory, ed., In Their Own Words (Cromer: Salt, 2012)
- Rob Pope, ed., Studying English Language and Literature: An Introduction and Companion (Oxford: Routledge, 2012)
- Tom Chivers, Adventures in Form (London: Penned in the Margins, 2012)
- Refugee Tales (Manchester: Comma Press, 2016)
- Margaret Busby, ed., New Daughters of Africa (Myriad Editions, 2019)
