= Michael Symmons Roberts =

British poet (born 1963)

Michael Symmons Roberts FRSL (born 1963) is a British poet.

He has published eight collections of poetry, all with Cape (Random House), and has won the Forward Prize, the Costa Book Award and the Whitbread Prize for Poetry, as well as major prizes from the Arts Council and Society of Authors. He has been shortlisted for the T. S. Eliot Prize, the Griffin Poetry Prize and the Ondaatje Prize. He has also written novels, libretti and texts for oratorios and song cycles. He regularly writes and presents documentaries and dramas for broadcasting and is Professor of Poetry at Manchester Metropolitan University.

== Life and career ==
Michael Symmons Roberts was born in Preston, Lancashire, and spent his childhood in Lancashire before moving south with his family to Newbury in Berkshire in the early '70s. He went to comprehensive school in Newbury, then to Regent's Park College, Oxford to read Philosophy and Theology. After graduating, he trained as a newspaper journalist before joining the BBC in Cardiff as a radio producer in 1989. He moved with the BBC to London, then to Manchester, initially in radio, then as a documentary filmmaker. His last job at the corporation was as Executive Producer and Head of Development for BBC Religion and Ethics, before he left the BBC to focus on writing.

Symmons Roberts' family was passively secular, but in his early teens he became a thoroughgoing atheist. When he gained a place at Oxford, this led him to change his course to Theology and philosophy, and his college to a Christian one, simply so that he could talk believers out of their faith. But things did not go according to plan: "As university went on I got deeply into philosophy — and the philosophy completely undermined my atheism, by making me realize that there was no overarching objectivity, no Dawkinsian bedrock of common sense if you strip everything away. I realized that atheism was just as culturally conditioned as being a Catholic."

The Oxford way of teaching, with its deconstructing, analytical approach, proved fatal, he says, to his assumption as "a naively dogmatic young atheist ... that atheism is exactly the same as 'common sense' or objectivity. I'm not saying that in psychological terms we can't be objective. I just mean that there is no framework of thought that can be completely objective. I have exactly the same problem with unquestioning religious dogmatism."

A convert to Roman Catholicism, Symmons Roberts has been described by Jeanette Winterson as "a religious poet for a secular age", and by Les Murray as "a poet for the new chastened, unenforcing age of faith that has just dawned". Miguel Cullen described his " millimetric adjective, the air-tight, wool-swaddled image, and that child's forensic perception, (that) he never grew out of". Alan Brownjohn wrote that his "religious poems ... seem designed for an age of doubt and DNA". Although rooted in the English lyric tradition, his work draws on the language of science (especially genetics and genomics), theology and philosophy.

== Work ==
His fourth book of poetry, Corpus, was the winner of the 2004 Whitbread Poetry Award, and was shortlisted for the T. S. Eliot Prize, the Forward Prize for best collection, and the Griffin Poetry Prize. He had previously received the Society of Authors' Gregory Award for British poets under 30 and the K Blundell Trust Award, and was shortlisted for the T. S. Eliot Prize for his 2001 collection Burning Babylon. In 2007 he received a major Arts Council Writers Award. In 2012 he was elected a Fellow of the English Association, for services to the language arts. In 2014 he was elected a Fellow of the Royal Society of Literature.

His sixth collection, Drysalter won the 2013 Forward Prize and the Costa Poetry Award, and was shortlisted for the T. S. Eliot Prize.

His continuing collaboration with composer James MacMillan has led to two BBC Proms choral commissions, song cycles, music theatre works and a new opera for the Welsh National Opera, The Sacrifice, which won the 2008 Royal Philharmonic Society Award.

His work for radio includes 'A Fearful Symmetry' – for Radio 4 – which won the Sandford St Martin Prize, 'Soldiers in the Sun' – for Radio 3 – which won the Clarion Award, and 'Last Words' commissioned by Radio 4 to mark the first anniversary of 9/11. His first novel, Patrick's Alphabet, was published by Jonathan Cape in 2006, and his second, Breath, in 2008. He is Professor of Poetry at Manchester Metropolitan University, a former trustee of the Arvon Foundation and a trustee of the Royal Literary Fund. He has judged many poetry awards including the Forward Prizes, the Eliot Prize and the Arvon International Poetry Prize.

== Awards and honours ==
=== Won ===
- Eric Gregory Award (1988)
- Poetry Book Society Recommendation (2001)
- Sandford St Martin Premier Award (2002)
- K Blundell Trust Award (2003)
- Jerusalem Trust Award (2004)
- Poetry Book Society Recommendation (2004)
- Whitbread Prize for Poetry (2004)
- Arts Council Writers Award (2007)
- Clarion Award for Radio Drama (2008)
- Royal Philharmonic Society Music Awards [with James MacMillan] (2008)
- Jerwood Award for Non-Fiction [with Paul Farley] (2009)
- Fellowship of the English Association (2012)
- Foyles Best Book of Ideas Award [with Paul Farley] (2012)
- Poetry Book Society Choice (2013)
- Forward Poetry Prize Best Poetry Collection of the Year (2013)
- Costa Book Award in Poetry for Drysalter (2013)
- Fellowship of the Royal Society of Literature (2014)
- Poetry Book Society Special Commendation (2016)
- Poetry Book Society Recommendation (2017)
- Poetry Book Society Recommendation (2021)
- Cholmondeley Award for Poetry (2023)

=== Shortlisted ===
- T. S. Eliot Prize (2001)
- T. S. Eliot Prize (2004)
- Forward Poetry Prize Best Poetry Collection of the Year (2004)
- Griffin International Poetry Prize (2005)
- Mental Health Award (for Radio Drama) (2008)
- Olivier Awards [with James MacMillan] (2012)
- Ondaatje Prize [with Paul Farley] (2012)
- T. S. Eliot Prize (2013)
- BBC Audio Drama Awards (2014) Best Single Drama for 'The Sleeper'
- BBC Audio Drama Awards (2015) Best Single Drama for 'Men Who Sleep in Cars' on BBC Radio 4
- Tinniswood Award (2015) Best Radio Drama Script for 'Men Who Sleep in Cars' on BBC Radio 4
- Portico Prize (2015)
- T. S. Eliot Prize (2017)
- T. S. Eliot Prize (2021)

== Works ==
=== Books ===
- Soft Keys, (Secker and Warburg, 1993). ISBN 0-436-41988-2
- Raising Sparks, (Jonathan Cape, 1999). ISBN 0-224-05902-5
- Burning Babylon, (Jonathan Cape, 2001). ISBN 0-224-06185-2
- Lime kilns, (Redundant Press, 2002). Limited edition
- Her Maker's Maker, (Phoenix Poetry Pamphlets, 2002). Limited edition
- Corpus, (Jonathan Cape, 2004) (winner of the 2004 Whitbread Poetry Award). ISBN 0-224-07342-7
- The Miracles of Jesus, (Lion Hudson, 2006). ISBN 0-7459-5194-5. Official tie-in to TV series
- Patrick's Alphabet, (Jonathan Cape, 2006). ISBN 0-224-07596-9
- Breath, (Jonathan Cape, 2008). ISBN 978-0-224-07802-3
- The Half Healed, (Jonathan Cape, 2008). ISBN 978-0-224-08567-0
- Edgelands: Journeys into England's True Wilderness (with Paul Farley), (Jonathan Cape, 2011). ISBN 978-0-224-08902-9
- Drysalter, (Jonathan Cape, 2013) (winner of the 2013 Costa Poetry Award). ISBN 978-0-22409359-0
- Selected Poems, (Jonathan Cape, 2016) ISBN 978-1-910-70242-0
- Deaths of the Poets, (with Paul Farley), (Jonathan Cape, 2017). ISBN 978-0-224-09754-3
- Mancunia, (Jonathan Cape, 2017) ISBN 978-1-91121-429-8
- Takk, (Illustrations by Jake Attree. Published by Andrew J Moorhouse, Fine Press Poetry, 2020)
- Ransom, (Jonathan Cape, 2021) ISBN 978-1-787-33312-3

=== Selected libretti ===
- Clemency (opera) [Royal Opera House][Scottish Opera][Boston Lyric Opera] (composer James MacMillan) (nominated for Olivier Award 2012)
- The Sleeper (opera) [Welsh National Opera] (composer Stephen Deazley)
- The Sacrifice [Welsh National Opera] (composer James MacMillan) (winner of RPS Award 2008)
- Parthenogenesis [widely performed in UK & abroad] (composer James MacMillan)
- The Birds of Rhiannon [BBC Proms commission] (composer James MacMillan)
- Quickening [BBC Proms commission] (composer James MacMillan)
- Raising Sparks [Nash Ensemble commission] (composer James MacMillan)
- Sun Dogs [3 Choirs Festival commission] (composer James MacMillan)
- Chosen (composer James MacMillan)

=== Selected broadcast work ===
- BBC Radio 3 interview and reading for – 'Northern Drift' – 2022
- BBC Radio 4 commissioned drama – 'Brimstone' – for 'Afternoon Play' – 2000
- BBC Radio 4 commissioned drama – 'Cleaning the Pipes' – for 'Fact to Fiction' – 2006
- BBC Radio 3 commissioned drama – 'Soldiers in the Sun' – 2007
- BBC Radio 4 commissioned drama – 'Worktown' – for 'Afternoon Play' – 2008
- BBC Radio 4 commissioned drama – 'Breath'- adaptation of MSR's novel for 'Friday Play' – 2008
- BBC Radio 3 commissioned drama – 'Idylls of the King' – adaptation of Tennyson poem – 2009
- BBC Radio 4 commissioned drama – 'A Man in Pieces' – for 'Afternoon Play' – 2010
- BBC Radio 3 commissioned drama – 'Migrant Mother' – 2010
- BBC Radio 4 commission – 'Last Words' – poem to mark 1st Anniversary of 9/11, performed by Sir Antony Sher, with music by John Harle.
- BBC Radio 4 / World Service commissioned poem for Hiroshima Day – 'A Fearful Symmetry.' With Fiona Shaw, Robert Tear and BBC Philharmonic. Music James Whitbourn.
- BBC Radio 2 commission – 'Behold the Man' – 6 part biography of Jesus. Performed by Derek Jacobi, repeated on BBC World Service.
- BBC Radio 4 commission – 'The Wounds' – poem for Good Friday, performed by Simon Russell Beale, with music by James Whitbourn.
- BBC Radio 4 commission – 'The Hurricane' – poem for Pentecost, performed by Fiona Shaw, with music by James Whitbourn.
- BBC Radio 4 commissioned poem – 'Crossing the Dark Sea' with composer James Whitbourn, to mark D-Day anniversary. With Christopher Eccleston and Katherine Jenkins.
- BBC Radio 4 commissioned poem – 'White Nights'
- BBC Radio 4 commissioned poem for 'Today' programme on National Poetry Day.
- BBC Radio 2 commission – 'Anno Domini' – 11 part history of Christianity in Britain, performed by Derek Jacobi.
- BBC Radio 4 commission – 'A Higher Place' – writer and presenter of series on Sacred Mountains of the world.
- BBC Radio 2 commission – writer and presenter of 'Landscape of Remembrance', on the poets of the First World War.
- BBC Radio 4 commission – 'Hound of Heaven' – on the Victorian poet Francis Thompson.
- BBC Radio 2 commission – 'The Good Book' – 6 part series on the Bible.
- BBC Radio 4 commission – 'The Chair' – on Welsh poetry.
- BBC Radio 4 writer and presenter of 'The Cross' documentary.
- BBC Radio 2 writer of six part series 'Sacred Nation' – a history of multi-faith Britain, presented by Christopher Eccleston
- BBC Radio 3 writer and presenter of 'Elegy' – feature about the history and meaning of the poetic elegy.
- BBC Radio 3 writer and presenter of 'Utopian Pessimist' – feature about Simone Weil.
- BBC Radio 4 writer and presenter of 'Three Faces of WH Auden' – 2023
