= Pascale Petit =

Pascale Petit may refer to:

- Pascale Petit (actress) (born 1938), French actress
- Pascale Petit (poet) (born 1953), French poet
