= Seán Hewitt =

English poet

Seán Hewitt FRSL
- Born: 1990 (age 35–36); Warrington, Cheshire, England
- Citizenship: British, Irish
- Education: University of Cambridge; University of Liverpool (PhD)
- Occupations: Poet, lecturer, critic
- Organizations: Trinity College Dublin
- Writing career
- Genres: Poetry; Literary criticism
- Notable works: Tongues of Fire; All Down Darkness Wide
- Notable awards: Rooney Prize for Irish Literature; Eric Gregory Award
- Website: seanehewitt.com

Seán Hewitt FRSL (born 1990) is a poet, lecturer and literary critic. In 2023, he was elected a Fellow of the Royal Society of Literature.

== Life ==
Seán Hewitt was born in Warrington, UK, to an Irish mother and English father. He studied English at Girton College, Cambridge.

Hewitt received his PhD, on the works of J. M. Synge, from the Institute of Irish Studies, University of Liverpool. He lives in Dublin, where he lectures at Trinity College Dublin.

== Career ==
Hewitt won an Eric Gregory Award in 2019 and won the Resurgence Poetry Prize in 2017. He also received a Northern Writers' Award in 2016. Hewitt was listed as one of The Sunday Times' "30 under 30" artists in Ireland in 2020. His pamphlet Lantern was a 2019 Poetry Book Society Pamphlet Choice.

Jonathan Cape in 2020. Tongues of Fire is a book of lyric poetry, and explores queer sexuality, grief, and the natural world. It was released to critical acclaim. It won the Laurel Prize in 2021 and the Rooney Prize for Irish Literature in 2022, and was shortlisted for the 2020 Sunday Times Young Writer of the Year Award, the 2021 John Pollard Foundation International Poetry Prize, and the 2021 Dalkey Literary Award for Emerging Writer. It was the Poetry Book of the Month in The Observer; a Book of the Year in The Guardian, The Irish Times, The Spectator, Attitude, and the Irish Independent; and was a Poetry Book Society Recommendation. The Sunday Times wrote of Hewitt that "his poetry will stand the test of time". Novelist Max Porter described Hewitt as "an exquisitely calm and insightful lyric poet, reverential in nature and gorgeously wise in the field of human drama."

Hewitt's book-length study of the Irish writer J. M. Synge, J.M. Synge: Nature, Politics, Modernism, was published by Oxford University Press. In 2021, he also edited the Candlestick Press anthology Ten Poems from the Countryside.

Hewitt's memoir, All Down Darkness Wide, was published in 2022. He was awarded the Rooney Prize for Irish Literature in 2022.

Hewitt's first novel, Open, Heaven, was published in 2025 by Alfred A. Knopf in New York and by Jonathan Cape in London.

Hewitt was the guest on BBC Radio 4's Take Four Books on 25 May 2025, discussing Open, Heaven, and three of the texts that influenced it. These three works were The Go-Between by L. P. Hartley, Maurice by E. M. Forster, and The Country Girls by Edna O'Brien.

In 2025, Hewitt was one of the judges of the PEN Heaney Prize.

== Awards ==
Year	Nominated work	Award	Category	Result	Ref.
2016	—	New Writing North Northern Writers' Award	Waterhouse Award	Winner	
2017	"Ilex"	Poetry School Resurgence Poetry Prize	—	Winner	
2019	—	Irish Research Council Researcher of the Year Awards	Maurice J. Bric Medal of Excellence	Winner	
2019	—	Eric Gregory Award	—	Winner	
2020	Tongues of Fire	Sunday Times Young Writer of the Year Award	—	Shortlisted	
2021	Tongues of Fire	Dalkey Literary Award	Emerging Writer	Shortlisted	
2021	Tongues of Fire	John Pollard Foundation International Poetry Prize	—	Shortlisted	
2021	Tongues of Fire	Poetry School Laurel Prize	—	Winner	
2022	—	Rooney Prize for Irish Literature	—	Winner	
2025	Rapture's Road	Dylan Thomas Prize	—	Shortlisted	
2025	Open, Heaven	Spiegel Buchpreis	—	Shortlisted	
2026	Open, Heaven	Dylan Thomas Prize	—	Shortlisted	

== Bibliography ==
Poetry

- Lantern (Offord Road Books, 2019)
- Tongues of Fire (Jonathan Cape, 2020)
- Buile Suibhne / Seán Hewitt, wood engravings by Amy Jeffs (Rochdale, England: Fine Press Poetry, 2021)
- 300,000 Kisses: Tales of Queer Love from the Ancient World, with Luke Edward Hall (Penguin, 2023)
- Rapture's Road (Jonathan Cape, 2024)
- Strange Light: Selected Poems (Alfred A. Knopf, 2026)

Critical studies

- J.M. Synge: Nature, Politics, Modernism (Oxford University Press, 2021)

Memoirs

- All Down Darkness Wide (Jonathan Cape (UK) and Penguin Press (USA), 2022)

Novels

- Open, Heaven (Penguin Books, 2025)

As editor

- Ten Poems from the Countryside (Candlestick Press, 2021) ISBN 9781907598937
