= Poetry School =

UK arts organisation (founded 1997)

Coordinates: 51.4967°N 0.0510°W

Poetry School is a national arts organisation, registered charity and adult education centre providing creative writing tuition, with teaching centres throughout England as well as online courses and downloadable activities. It was founded in 1997 by poets Mimi Khalvati, Jane Duran and Pascale Petit. Poetry School offers an accredited Master's degree in Writing Poetry, delivered in both London and Newcastle, in collaboration with Newcastle University. Online courses are delivered via CAMPUS, a social network dedicated to poetry.

The Poetry School's annual Books of the Year list is released in December, and celebrates noteworthy books and pamphlets of poetry published during the year.

Poetry School works with a number of partner organisations to deliver a range of projects, including the Ginkgo Prize for Ecopoetry, the Primers mentorship scheme, and, from 2018, a new poetry award and mentorship programme, the Women Poets' Prize, in memory of The Literary Consultancy co-founder Rebecca Swift. The Women Poets' Prize offers three female-identifying poets a programme of support and creative professional development opportunities in collaboration with seven partner organisations, including (in addition to Poetry School) Faber and Faber, Bath Spa University, The Literary Consultancy, RADA, City Lit and Verve Festival.

== Ginkgo Prize for Ecopoetry ==
Poetry School runs the Ginkgo Prize for Ecopoetry (formerly the Resurgence Prize), a major international award for poems embracing ecological themes, with a first prize of £5,000.

The Resurgence Prize was founded in 2014 by poet Andrew Motion and actress and activist Joanna Lumley. The Ginkgo Prize was established in 2018 with funding from the Edward Goldsmith Foundation to commemorate the poet Teddy Goldsmith on the 25th anniversary of the publication of his book The Way.

=== Winners of the Resurgence Prize (to 2017) ===
- 2015 – Luisa Igloria, "Auguries"
- 2016 – Rob Miles, "Captivity"
- 2017 – Seán Hewitt, "Ilex"

=== Winners of the Ginkgo Prize (from 2018) ===
- 2018

1st: Jemma Borg, "Unripe"
2nd: Teresa Dzieglewicz, "If you're married, why do you call her Teresa?"
3rd: Linda France, "In the Physic Garden"

- 2019

1st: Sue Riley, "A Polar Bear in Norilsk"
2nd: Anne McDonnell, "Once There Were Fish"
3rd: Rosamund Taylor, "Lammergeier"
Environmental Defenders Prize: Emma Must, "Toll"

- 2020

1st: Jane Lovell, "Ming"
2nd: Daniel Fraser, "Field Notes"
3rd: Emily Groves, "What Survives of Us"
AONB Best Poem of Landscape Prize: Liz Byrne, "Anglezarke Moor"

- 2021

1st: Teresa Dzieglewicz,"Earth I don't know how to love you"
2nd: Hilary Menos, "3.5 % Rule"
3rd Liz Byrne, "An Owl the Size of my Smallest Fingernail"
AONB Best Poem of Landscape: Ross Styants, "Avon in Summer Rain"

== Laurel Prize ==
In November 2019, poet laureate Simon Armitage announced that he would donate his salary as poet laureate to create a new prize for a collection of poems "with nature and the environment at their heart", the prize being run by the Poetry School. The first award was to be announced on 23 May 2020 at the Yorkshire Sculpture Park, the judges being Armitage, Robert Macfarlane, and Moniza Alvi. Armitage has said that the prize should "be part of the discourse and awareness about our current environmental predicament".

=== Laurel Prize winners 2020 ===
The shortlisted poems were discussed on BBC Radio 3's The Verb in September 2020, and the winners were announced on National Poetry Day.

- 1st: Pascale Petit, Mama Amazonica (Bloodaxe)
- 2nd: Karen McCarthy Woolf, Seasonal Disturbances (Carcanet)
- 3rd: Colin Simms, Hen Harrier (Shearsman)
- Best First Collection: Matt Howard, Gall (Rialto)

=== Laurel Prize winners 2021 ===
- 1st: Seán Hewitt, Tongues of Fire (Jonathan Cape)
- 2nd: Ash Davida Jane, How to Live with Mammals (Victoria University Press)
- 3rd: Sean Borodale, Inmates (Jonathan Cape)
- Best First Collection: Will Burns, Country Music (Offord Road Books)

=== Laurel Prize winners 2022 ===
- 1st: Linda France
- 2nd: Steve Ely
- 3rd: Jemma Borg
- Best First Collection: Cynthia Miller
- Best International First Collection: Rebecca Hawkes

== Primers ==
Primers is an annual mentoring and publication scheme organised by Poetry School and Nine Arches Press. It provides a unique opportunity for talented poets to find publication and receive a programme of supportive feedback, mentoring and promotion.

=== Previous winners ===
- 2015 – Geraldine Clarkson, Lucy Ingrams, Katie Griffiths, Maureen Cullen
- 2016 – Cynthia Miller, Ben Bransfield, Marvin Thompson
- 2017 – Romalyn Ante, Aviva Dautch, Sarala Estruch
- 2018 – Lewis Buxton, Victoria Richards, Amelia Louli
