= Kae Tempest =

English poet, musical artist, novelist and playwright

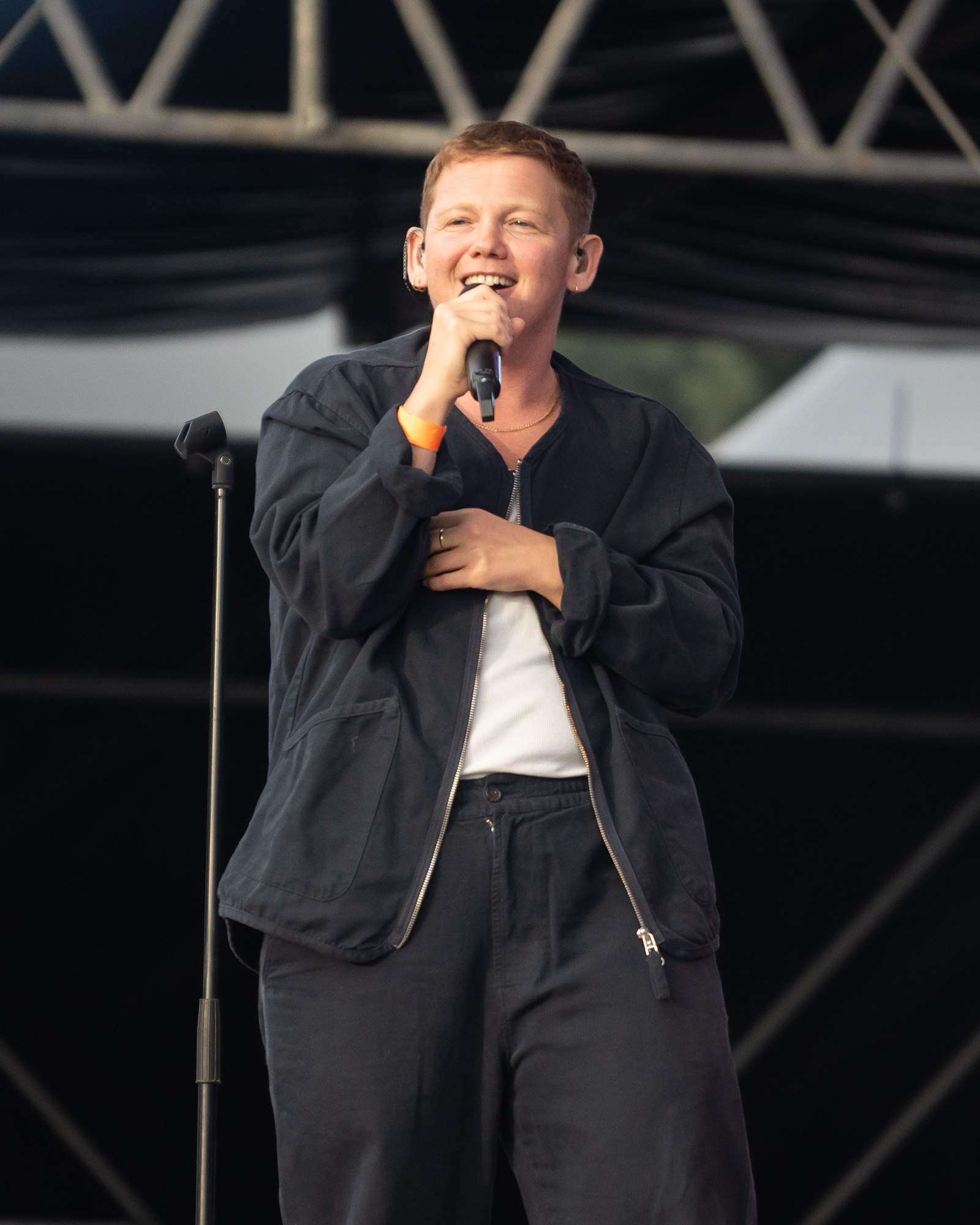
- Tempest at La Route du Rock in 2024
- Born: 1985 (age 40–41); London, England
- Occupations: Poet; playwright; novelist; rapper; recording artist
- Notable work: Hopelessly Devoted; Wasted; Brand New Ancients; Everybody Down; Hold Your Own; The Bricks That Built The Houses; Let Them Eat Chaos; Self Titled
- Musical career
- Genres: Spoken word; hip-hop
- Instrument: Vocals
- Labels: Island; American Recordings; Fiction; Big Dada; Ninja Tune; Lex; Gearbox
- Website: www.kaetempest.co.uk

Kae Tempest (born 1985), formerly Kate Tempest, is an English spoken word performer, poet, recording artist, novelist, and playwright. As of 2026 he has released seven studio albums and many singles, as well as many collections of poetry, several plays, two novels, and one work of non-fiction. He has performed around the world, on tours and at festivals. Tempest came out as non-binary in 2020, then as a trans man in 2025.

Tempest attended the BRIT School for Performing Arts and Technology in Croydon, and began to perform under the moniker "Excentral Tempest". From 2008 until around 2011, he performed as a rapper along with two musicians in the band Sound of Rum. In 2013, he won the Ted Hughes Award for his work Brand New Ancients, and was named a Next Generation poet in 2014 by the Poetry Book Society. Tempest's albums Everybody Down (2014) and Let Them Eat Chaos (2016) were nominated for the Mercury Music Prize, and the poetry book titled Let Them Eat Chaos was nominated for the Costa Book of the Year in the Poetry category. His debut novel The Bricks That Built the Houses (2016) was a Sunday Times best-seller and won the 2017 Books Are My Bag Readers' Award for Breakthrough Author. He was nominated as Best Female Solo Performer at the 2018 Brit Awards. Tempest released his fifth studio album Self Titled in 2025, and his second novel, Having Spent Life Seeking, was published on 30 April 2026.

== Early life and education ==
Kae Tempest was born in 1985 in South-east London, and grew up in Brockley, South East London. He was one of five children, with a father who was a labourer studying to be a criminal lawyer, and a mother who was a teacher.

Tempest worked in a record shop from age 14 to 18. He went to Thomas Tallis School, leaving at 16 to study at the BRIT School for Performing Arts and Technology in Croydon. He first performed at open mic nights at Deal Real, a small hip-hop store in Soho, when he was 16.

He went on to graduate in English Literature from Goldsmiths, University of London.

== Career ==
Tempest first performed under the moniker "Excentral Tempest". In 2008, Tempest formed the band Sound of Rum, speaking his poetry to the music of guitarist Archie Marsh and drummer Ferry Lawrenson. His first single, " first single, Slow Slow", was released on 28 February 2011, and an album, Balance, on the Sunday Best label on 9 May 2011.

In March 2012 aged 26, he launched the theatrical spoken word piece Brand New Ancients at the Battersea Arts Centre, to great critical acclaim. The piece, performed to an orchestral backing, won Tempest the Ted Hughes Award for innovation in poetry (making him the youngest, at 28, to have won the award) in 2013; Herald Angel Award at the Edinburgh Fringe, and the Offie for Best Production That Defies Traditional Categories. In July 2012, Tempest released his first poetry book Everything Speaks in its Own Way, a limited edition run on his own imprint, Zingaro, which included a CD and DVD of his performances.

His first play, Wasted, was published in 2013. The play, centred on three school friends who meet on the anniversary of their friend Tony's death a decade earlier, was staged in 2017 at Fortnight Theatre by Durham University students, and again in 2022 later by Why Not? Productions, at the Princess Royal Centre for Performing Arts in Guernsey. In September 2013, his play Hopelessly Devoted was produced by Paines Plough and premiered at Birmingham Repertory Theatre.

In 2014, Tempest released the album Everybody Down (Big Dada, Ninja Tune), which was produced by Dan Carey and was nominated for the 2014 Mercury Prize.

In October 2014, Tempest published his first poetry collection for Picador, Hold Your Own. The collection was a commercial and critical success and its release coincided with Tempest being named a Next Generation Poet.

In April 2016, his debut novel The Bricks That Built The Houses was published by Bloomsbury and was a Sunday Times Bestseller. It won the Books Are My Bag Best Breakthrough Author Award.

Tempest released the album Let Them Eat Chaos on 7 October 2016. It debuted at no. 28 on the UK Albums Chart, and was also released in book format (Picador). The album was also nominated for the Mercury Prize, this time in 2017.

Tempest was appointed as guest director of the 2017 Brighton Festival, on the theme "Everyday Epic".

His song "People's Faces" was used for the Facebook commercial "We're Never Lost If We Can Find Each Other", created by the agency Droga5, and released on 9 April 2020.

In October 2020, Tempest published his first work of non-fiction, a book-length essay called On Connection, about people's "need to combat alienation through creativity" and live art. In it, Tempest wrote that he was inspired by Carl Jung's The Red Book, particularly his theory of that each person has an everyday ego as well as a "wild, inner spirit of the depths".

Paradise, Tempest's modern adaptation of Sophocles' Greek classic, Philoctetes, premiered at the National Theatre from 4 August to 11 September 2021. The all-female cast, featuring Lesley Sharp, was directed by Ian Rickson and performed in the Olivier Theatre.

On 4 July 2025, Tempest released his fifth studio album Self Titled through Island Records. The album features collaborations with Neil Tennant, Tawiah, Connie Constance, and Young Fathers. The album was the first to be released after his medical transition, so the first to showcase his deeper, more masculine voice. According to the review aggregator Metacritic, Self Titled received "universal acclaim" based on a weighted average score of 85 out of 100 from 8 critic scores.

His second novel, Having Spent Life Seeking, was published on 30 April 2026.

=== Touring and festivals ===
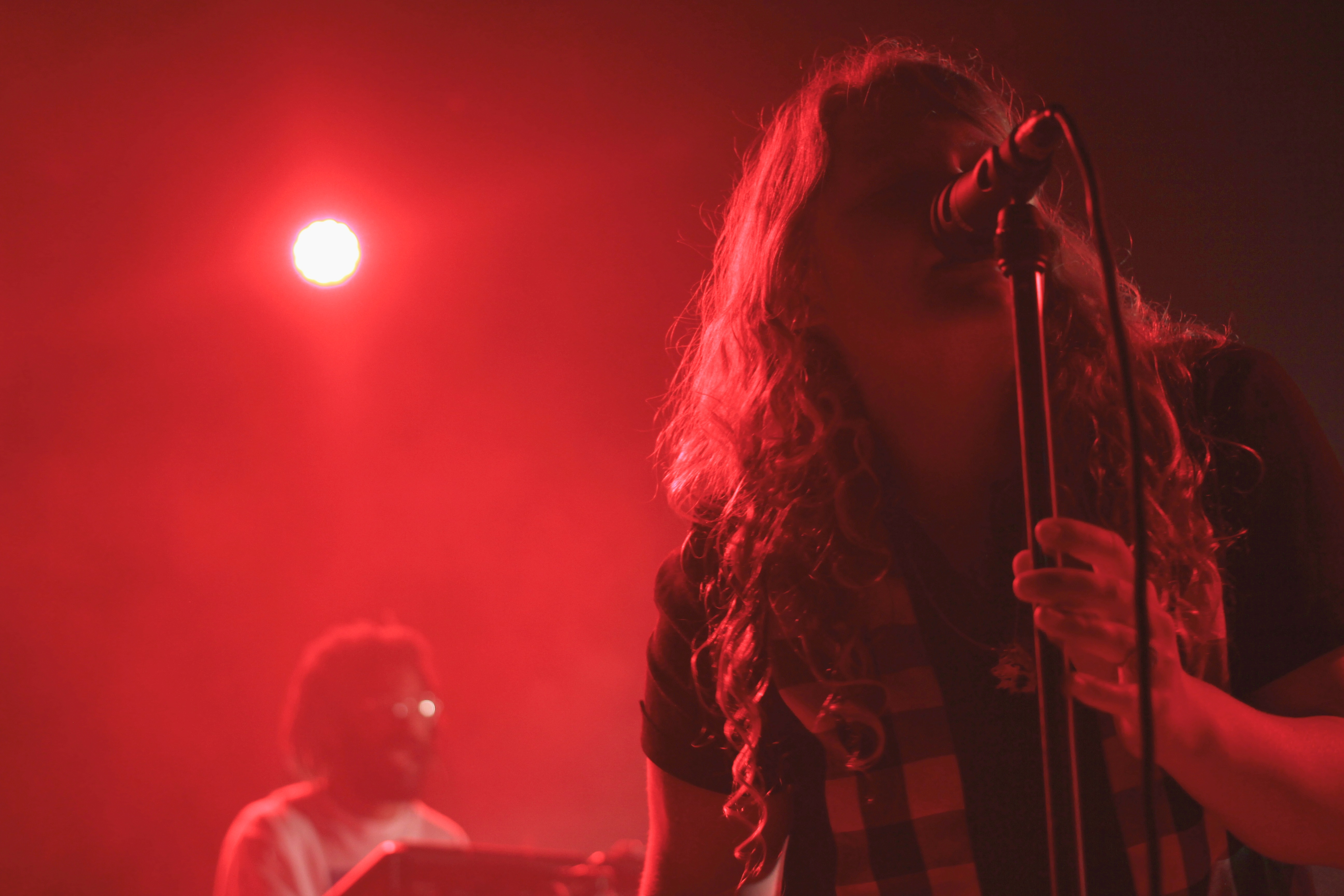
Tempest performing at Way Out West 2015 in Gothenburg, Sweden

Since the release of Everybody Down in 2014, Tempest increased touring as a musician, playing at festivals and headlining shows with his live band, which in 2018 consisted of Kwake Bass on drums, Dan Carey on synths, and Clare Uchima on keyboards.

Tempest has toured extensively, including in Europe, Australia, and the US. He performed at the Way Out West festival in Gothenburg, Sweden, in 2015 and at the 2017 Treefort Music Fest in Boise, Idaho, US.

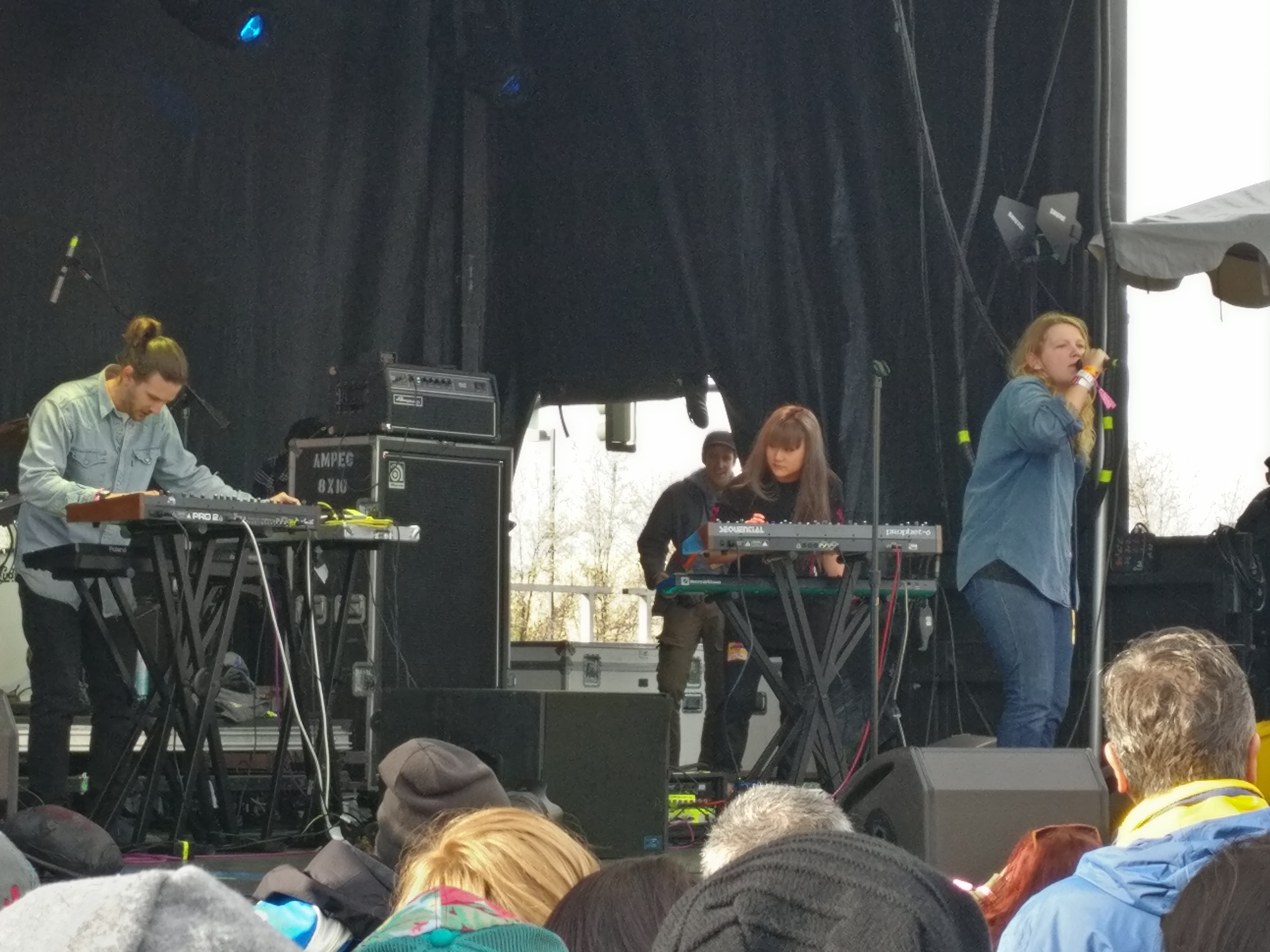
Tempest performs his album Let Them Eat Chaos, at the 2017 Treefort Music Fest in Boise, Idaho

Tempest appeared several times at Brighton Dome and at Brighton Festival, with the play Wasted selling out at the latter in 2012. In 2014 he performed Brand New Ancients to two full houses in Brighton, and in 2015 headlined an event at the festival alongside George the Poet and Hollie McNish.

In 2024, Tempest performed at La Route du Rock in Saint-Malo, France.

He has also performed at The Big Chill, Latitude, Shambala, and Glastonbury Festivals.

In June 2026, Tempest toured Australia, performing in Perth, Melbourne, Brisbane, and Sydney.

=== Influences ===
Some of Tempest's influences include Christopher Logue (his "favourite poet"), Samuel Beckett, James Joyce, W B Yeats, William Blake, W H Auden, and Wu-Tang Clan.

== Recognition and awards ==
=== Critical reception ===
Tempest has received wide critical acclaim for his written and live work.

The Economist said of Tempest's commission from the Royal Shakespeare Company in 2012: "A stunning piece by [Kae] Tempest, a London-born performance poet, comes bursting off the screen. Rarely has the relevance of Shakespeare to our language, to the very fabric of our feelings, been expressed with quite such youthful passion. (It should be mandatory viewing for all teenagers.)"

Lyn Gardner, writing in The Guardian, commented of Brand New Ancients in 2012: "Suddenly it feels as if we are not in a theatre but a church... gathered around a hearth, hearing the age-old stories that help us make sense of our lives. We're given the sense that what we are watching is something sacred". In 2013, Sam Wolfson wrote in the same newspaper: "[He is] one of the brightest talents around. [His] spoken-word performances have the metre and craft of traditional poetry, the kinetic agitation of hip-hop and the intimacy of a whispered heart-to-heart... Tempest deals bravely with poverty, class and consumerism. [He does] so in a way that not only avoids the pitfalls of sounding trite, but manages to be beautiful too, drawing on ancient mythology and sermonic cadence to tell stories of the everyday".

A performance of Brand New Ancients prompted Charles Isherwood to write in The New York Times: "As gorgeous streams of words flow out, [he conjures] a story so vivid it's as if you had a state-of-the-art Blu-ray player stuffed into your brain, projecting image after image that sears itself into your consciousness" while a review by Michiko Kakutani of his poetry collections in the same paper explored his written style: "While [his] intense performances on stage add a fierce urgency to the words, these text versions of [his] work stand powerfully on their own on the page...using [his] pictorial imagination to sear specific images into the reader's mind".

=== Awards and nominations ===
In 2013, aged 28, he won the Ted Hughes Award for innovation in poetry for his work Brand New Ancients, the first person under the age of 40 to win the award, as well as an Herald Angel Award at the Edinburgh Fringe, and the Offie for Best Production That Defies Traditional Categories.

In 2014, Tempest was selected as one of the 2014 Next Generation Poets by the Poetry Society. The society selects, once every ten years, 20 poets who are "expected to dominate the poetry landscape of the coming decade". Also in 2014, Everybody Down was nominated for the Mercury Prize, and in the album 2015 won the Soundcheck Award in Berlin.

Tempest was elected a Fellow of the Royal Society of Literature in 2015.

Let Them Eat Chaos was nominated for the 2017 Mercury Music Prize. His accompanying poetry book Let Them Eat Chaos was nominated for the Costa Book of the Year in the Poetry Category in 2016.

At the 2018 Brit Awards, he was nominated as Best Female Solo Performer.

== Personal life ==
In August 2020, Tempest came out as non-binary, using they/them pronouns, and changed his name to Kae. In a 2023 BBC documentary, Tempest documented his experiences having top surgery and beginning to take testosterone, and also opened up about his mental health struggles as a touring musician. In 2025, Tempest came out as a trans man and began using he/him pronouns.

Tempest later said that he had experienced panic attacks on stage for many years before his transition, but had rediscovered the joy of performing live since transitioning.

=== Politics ===
In November 2019, along with other public figures, Tempest signed a letter supporting Labour Party leader Jeremy Corbyn, describing him as "a beacon of hope in the struggle against emergent far-right nationalism, xenophobia and racism in much of the democratic world", and endorsed him in the 2019 UK general election. In December 2019, along with 42 other leading cultural figures, he signed a letter endorsing the Labour Party under Corbyn's leadership in the 2019 general election. The letter stated that "Labour's election manifesto under Jeremy Corbyn's leadership offers a transformative plan that prioritises the needs of people and the planet over private profit and the vested interests of a few."

In 2024, he participated in an event at the Roundhouse theatre in support of Medical Aid for Palestinians.

== Publications ==
=== Poetry collections ===
- 2012: Everything Speaks in its Own Way
- 2013: Brand New Ancients
- 2014: Hold Your Own
- 2015: What Day is Bin Collection?
- 2016: Let Them Eat Chaos
- 2016: Pictures on a Screen
- 2018: Running Upon The Wires
- 2023: Divisible By Itself and One

=== Spoken word performance ===
- 2012: Brand New Ancients – Ted Hughes Award 2013 (2014 released as CD)

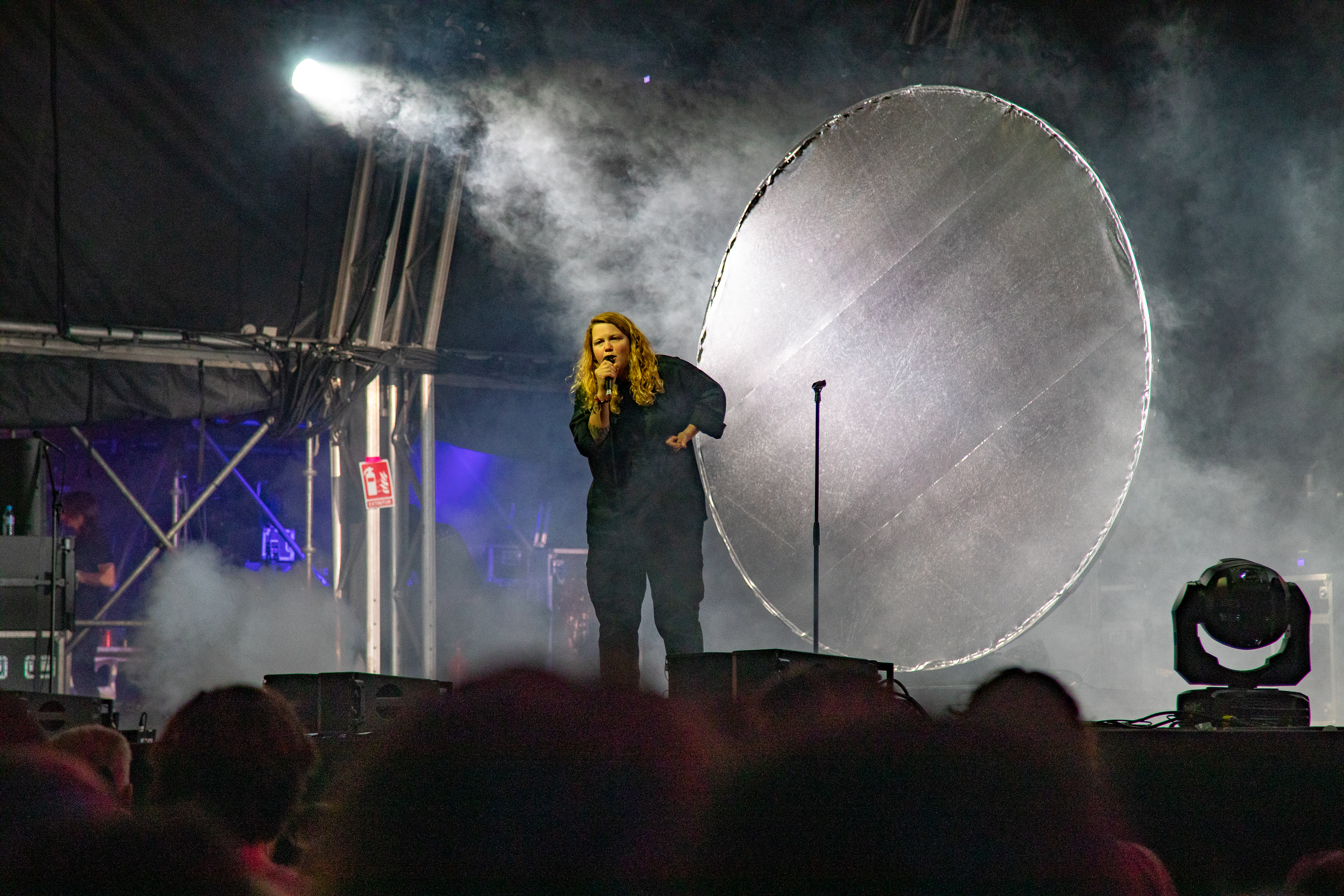
Tempest at Primavera Sound 2019

=== Plays ===
- 2012: Wasted
- 2014: Glasshouse
- 2014: Hopelessly Devoted
- 2021: Paradise

=== Novel ===
- 2016: The Bricks That Built the Houses, Bloomsbury Circus, London
- 2026: Having Spent Life Seeking, Jonathan Cape, London

=== Non-fiction book ===
- 2020: On Connection, Faber & Faber, London

== Discography ==
=== Studio albums ===
List of studio albums, with selected details and chart positions
Title	Details	Peak chart positions	
Title	Details	UK	SCO
Balance (with Sound of Rum)	Released: 2011; Label: Self-released; Formats: CD, cassette, digital download, streaming, vinyl	—	—
Brand New Ancients	Released: 2014; Label: Gearbox Records; Formats: CD, cassette, digital download, streaming, vinyl	—	—
Everybody Down	Released: 2014; Label: Big Dada; Formats: CD, cassette, digital download, streaming, vinyl	94	—
Let Them Eat Chaos	Released: 7 October 2016; Label: Fiction/Lex; Formats: CD, cassette, digital download, streaming, vinyl	28	34
The Book of Traps and Lessons	Released: 14 June 2019; Label: American Recordings/Fiction; Formats: CD, cassette, digital download, streaming, vinyl	30	26
The Line Is a Curve	Released: 8 April 2022; Label: American Recordings/Fiction; Formats: CD, cassette, digital download, streaming, vinyl	8	4
Self Titled	Released: 4 July 2025; Label: Island; Formats: CD, cassette, digital download, streaming, vinyl	25	3
"—" denotes recording that did not chart in that territory.

=== Singles ===
- 2014: "Our Town"
- 2014: "Circles"
- 2014: "Hot Night Cold Spaceship"
- 2015: "Bad Place for a Good Time"
- 2016: "Guts (with Loyle Carner)"
- 2016: "Truth Is Telling (with Blasco Says)"
- 2020: "Unholy Elixir"
- 2022: “More Pressure (with Kevin Abstract)”
- 2022: "Salt Coast"
- 2022: "No Prizes"
- 2022: "I Saw Light"
- 2022: "Move Rework"
- 2023: "Nice Idea"
- 2023: "Love Harder"
- 2025: "Statue In The Square"
- 2025: "Know Yourself"
- 2025: "Diagnoses"
- 2025: "Freedom! '25"

=== As featured artist ===
- 2008: "I Got Love (remix)" (The King Blues featuring Kae Tempest)
- 2010: "Drum Song (brentonLABS Remix)" (The Temper Trap featuring Kae Tempest)
- 2011: "Can't Take Another Earthquake" - (Beans On Toast - featuring Kae Tempest)
- 2012: "Forever Ever" (Bastille featuring Kae Tempest & Jay Brown)
- 2014: "Our Town" (letthemusicplay featuring Kae Tempest)
- 2014: "Rain" (Rag'n'Bone Man featuring Kae Tempest)
- 2014: "Summer" (letthemusicplay featuring Kae Tempest)
- 2018: "Kairos" (Warsnare featuring Kae Tempest)
- 2018: "A Child Is an Open Book" (Damien Dempsey featuring Kae Tempest)
- 2018: "Usubscribe" (Jam Baxter featuring Kae Tempest)
- 2018: "6 Millions Stories" (Foreign Beggars featuring Kae Tempest, Bangzy, Scott Garcia & Bionic)
- 2019: "Blood of the Past" (The Comet is Coming featuring Kae Tempest)
- 2020: "Time Is Hardcore" (High Contrast featuring Kae Tempest & Anita Blay)
- 2023: "We Were We Still Are" (Fraser T. Smith featuring Kae Tempest)
- 2023: "Geronimo Blues" (Speakers Corner Quartet with Kae Tempest)
- 2026: "Flags" (Damon Albarn, Grian Chatten & Kae Tempest)
- 2026: "Irish Goodbye" (Kneecap featuring Kae Tempest)
