= Tobias Hill =

British writer (1970–2023)

- Born: Tobias Fleet Hill; 30 March 1970; London, England
- Died: 26 August 2023 (aged 53); London, England
- Education: University of Sussex
- Occupations: Poet; author
- Spouse: Hannah Donat (m. 2003)
- Children: One
- Writing career
- Period: 1995–2014

Tobias Fleet Hill (30 March 1970 – 26 August 2023) was a British poet, essayist, writer of short stories and novelist.

== Life ==
Tobias Hill was born in Kentish Town, in North London, to parents of German Jewish and English extraction; Hill identified as Jewish. His maternal grandfather was the brother of Gottfried Bermann, confidant of Thomas Mann and, as owner of S. Fischer Verlag, German literature's leading publisher-in-exile during the Second World War. Hill's father was a journalist and his mother was a graphic designer. Hill was educated at Hampstead School and the University of Sussex before spending two years teaching in Japan. He lived in Cricklewood, north London.

Hill married Hannah Donat in 2003, and they had one child, Kit. He had a stroke in 2014, which ended his writing career. Hill died from glioblastoma on 26 August 2023, at the age of 53.

== Work ==
=== Poetry ===
Hill's early work appeared in magazines such as Envoi and The Frogmore Papers and published four collections, Year of the Dog (1995), Midnight in the City of Clocks (1996) (influenced by his experience of life in Japan) Zoo (1998) and Nocturne in Chrome & Sunset Yellow (2006). The last of these was described by The Guardian as "A vital, luminous collection... it is rare to come across a collection of poetry that you know with certainty you will still be reading years from now, but for me, this is such a book." Hill's collection of short stories, Skin (1997), was serialised on BBC Radio 4, was shortlisted for the 1998 John Llewellyn Rhys/Mail on Sunday Prize, and won the International PEN/Macmillan Silver Pen Award.

=== Novels ===
In 1999, Hill published his debut novel, Underground. Set on the London Underground, this dark, neo-gothic work follows the story of Casimir, a Polish immigrant, as he comes to terms with his personal and national past. Underground won the Betty Trask Prize and the Arts Council Writer's Award.

The Love of Stones (2001), Hill's second novel, garnered wider recognition: it charts the lives of two nineteenth-century Jewish brothers and a contemporary protagonist, Katharine Sterne, whose stories are entwined with that of a jewel known as "The Three Brothers", once owned by Elizabeth I, but lost since the 17th century.

Hill's third novel, The Cryptographer, was published in 2003. A sparer narrative than The Love of Stones, it tells the story of a global financial disaster, examining issues of trust and secrecy. The Cryptographer is set in the near future, but comprises a shadow portrait of the enigmatic historical figure John Law. In December 2003 the Hay Festival showcased the novel as its Book of the Year. It was described by the author A. S. Byatt as evidence of "one of the two or three most original and interesting young novelists working in Britain today".

Tobias Hill's fourth novel, The Hidden, was published to acclaim in January 2009. In the Guardian, the author James Lasdun called it "an elaborate mystery along the lines of The Magus or The Secret History, and a sustained meditation on the special ethics of terrorism in ancient and modern times...You don't often see writing as lively as this." The author Kamila Shamsie, in The Observer, wrote: "Apart from everything else that this novel is — a beautifully paced thriller, a meditation on loss, guilt, obsession — it is also one of the finest novels written so far about this, our age of terror."

=== Other work ===
Hill wrote one book for children, The Lion Who Ate Everything, illustrated by Michael Foreman, twice winner of the Kate Greenaway Medal. He has also written for The Times, The Observer, The Independent, The Guardian and Time Out. From 1998 to 2001, he was the Sunday Telegraph's rock critic. He has edited the works of other writers, including Edgar Allan Poe. In 2012, Hill, along with Brooke Magnanti, acted as a judge for Fleeting Magazine's Six-Word Short Story Prize.

== Critical perspective ==
Amongst contemporary British authors, Hill was unusual in achieving recognition as a poet, a novelist and a writer of short stories. In 2003 he was nominated as one of the best young writers in Britain by the Times Literary Supplement. In 2004 he was selected as one of the country's Next Generation poets. His novels have been published worldwide.

Secrecy, revelation and obsession are recurrent themes in Hill's fiction. In Skin, a worker at London Zoo investigates the disappearance of dead animals at the hands of an eerie figure, the Featherman, finally discovering his formalin-drenched lair in Camden Town's derelict stable-yards. In Underground, Casimir's physical explorations of London's subterranean echo his mental rediscovery of a traumatic childhood in Poland. In The Love of Stones, Katharine Sterne devotes her life to a search for a legendary lost jewel, the Three Brethren. The same motifs are used to powerful effect in The Hidden, and indeed the novel is prefaced with a quotation from John Dalberg-Acton, 1st Baron Acton: "Every thing secret degenerates".

== Awards, residencies and associations ==
Hill held writing residencies at Newnham College, Cambridge, Sussex University, and Eton College. In 1999 he was the inaugural Poet in Residence at London Zoo. In 2009 he became inaugural Programme Director of the Faber Academy. In 2012 he was appointed senior lecturer on the MA Creative Writing Course at Oxford Brookes University.

His awards include an Eric Gregory Award in 1995, the Ian St James Award in 1997, and the Pen/Macmillan Silver Pen Award in 1997. He was shortlisted for the Mail on Sunday/John Llewellyn Rhys Prize in 2002 and 2004, and for the Sunday Times Young Writer of the Year Award in 2004. He was elected a Fellow of the Royal Society of Literature in 2011.

== Bibliography ==
- Year of the Dog, National Poetry Foundation, 1995
- Midnight in the City of Clocks, Oxford University Press, 1996
- Skin, Faber and Faber, 1997
- Zoo, Oxford University Press, 1998
- Underground, Faber and Faber, 1999
- The Love of Stones, Faber and Faber, 2001
- The Cryptographer, Faber and Faber, 2003
- Nocturne in Chrome & Sunset Yellow, Salt Publishing, 2006
- The Lion Who Ate Everything, Walker, 2008
- The Hidden, Faber and Faber, 2009
- What Was Promised, Bloomsbury, 2014
