= Paul Farley =

British poet, writer and broadcaster

Paul Farley FRSL
- Born: 1965 (age 60–61); Liverpool, England
- Education: Chelsea College of Art & Design
- Occupations: Poet; Broadcaster
- Writing career
- Subject: Poetry

Paul Farley FRSL (born 1965) is a British poet, writer and broadcaster.

== Life and work ==
Farley was born in Liverpool in 1965. He studied painting at the Chelsea School of Art, and has lived in London, Brighton and Cumbria.

Farley's first collection of poetry, The Boy from the Chemist is Here to See You (1998) won a Forward Poetry Prize (Best First Collection) in 1998, and was shortlisted for the Whitbread Prize. The book also gained him the Somerset Maugham Award, and in 1999 he won the Sunday Times Young Writer of the Year Award. From 2000 to 2002, he was the poet-in-residence at the Wordsworth Trust in Grasmere. His second collection, The Ice Age (2002), received the Whitbread Poetry Award.

In 2004, Farley was named as one of the Poetry Book Society's Next Generation poets. His third collection, Tramp in Flames (2006), was shortlisted for the Griffin Poetry Prize. A poem from the collection, ‘Liverpool Disappears for a Billionth of a Second’, was awarded the Forward Prize for Best Individual Poem. The same year he also published a study of Terence Davies' film, Distant Voices, Still Lives. In 2007, he edited a selection of John Clare for Faber's Poet to Poet series.

As a broadcaster Farley has made many arts features and documentary programmes for radio and television, as well as original radio dramas, and his poems for radio are collected in Field Recordings: BBC Poems 1998-2008. He makes regular appearances on BBC Radio 4’s Saturday Review, Front Row and BBC Radio 3's The Verb, and he presented the contemporary poetry programme The Echo Chamber on Radio 4 from 2012 to 2018.

Farley's book Edgelands, a non-fiction journey into England's overlooked wilderness (co-authored with Michael Symmons Roberts) was published by Jonathan Cape in 2011. It received the Royal Society of Literature’s Jerwood Award and the Foyles Best Book of Ideas Award 2012, and was serialised as a BBC Radio 4 Book of the Week. His fourth collection, The Dark Film, was a Poetry Book Society Choice in 2012.

In 2009, Farley received the E. M. Forster Award from the American Academy of Arts & Letters. He was elected a Fellow of the Royal Society of Literature in 2012.

Farley currently lives in Lancashire and is Professor of Poetry at Lancaster University. His fifth collection, The Mizzy, was shortlisted for the 2019 Costa Poetry Award and the 2019 T. S. Eliot Prize. His sixth collection, When It Rained for a Million Years, was shortlisted for the 2025 T. S. Eliot Prize.

== Awards ==
- 1996 ObserverArvon International Poetry Competition
- 1998 Geoffrey Dearmer Award
- 1998 Forward Poetry Prize for Best First Collection, The Boy from the Chemist is Here to See You
- 1999 Somerset Maugham Award
- 1999 Sunday Times Young Writer of the Year Award
- 2000 Arts Council Writer's Award
- 2002 Whitbread Poetry Award, The Ice Age
- 2005 Forward Poetry Prize for Best Single Poem, "Liverpool Disappears for a Billionth of a Second"
- 2007 Griffin International Poetry Prize, shortlist, Tramp in Flames
- 2009 Royal Society of Literature Jerwood Award for Non-Fiction, Edgelands
- 2009 E. M. Forster Award (American Academy of Arts & Letters)
- 2009 Travelling Scholarship of the Society of Authors
- 2012 Foyles Best Book of Ideas, Edgelands
- 2012 Fellow of the Royal Society of Literature
- 2013 Cholmondeley Award of the Society of Authors
- 2019 T. S. Eliot Prize, shortlist, The Mizzy
- 2019 Costa Poetry Award, shortlist, The Mizzy
- 2025 T. S. Eliot Prize, shortlist, When It Rained for a Million Years

== Works ==
=== Bibliography ===
- The Boy from the Chemist is Here to See You (London: Picador, 1998) ISBN 978-0-330-35481-3
- The Ice Age (London: Picador, 2002) ISBN 978-0-330-48453-4
- Distant Voices, Still Lives (London: British Film Institute, 2006) (about the film of the same name by Terence Davies) ISBN 978-1-84457-139-0
- Tramp in Flames (London: Picador, 2006) ISBN 978-0-330-44007-3
- Field Recordings: BBC Poems (1998-2008) (London: Donut Press, 2009) ISBN 978-0-9553604-6-6
- The Atlantic Tunnel: Selected Poems (New York: Farrar, Straus and Giroux, 2010) ISBN 978-0-86547-917-3
- Edgelands: Journeys into England's True Wilderness (with Michael Symmons Roberts) (London: Jonathan Cape, 2011) ISBN 978-0-224-08902-9
- The Dark Film (London: Picador, 2012) ISBN 978-1-4472-1255-3
- Selected Poems (London: Picador, 2014) ISBN 978-1-4472-2042-8
- Deaths of the Poets (with Michael Symmons Roberts) (London: Jonathan Cape, 2017) ISBN 978-0-224-09754-3
- The Mizzy (London: Picador, 2019) ISBN 978-1-5290-0979-8
- Contributor to A New Divan: A Lyrical Dialogue Between East and West (Gingko Library, 2019). ISBN 9781909942554
- Contributor to Refractive Pool: Contemporary Painting in Liverpool (contains The Studio) (Refractive Pool, 2021). ISBN 978-1-3999-0949-5
- When It Rained for a Million Years (London: Picador, 2025) ISBN 978-1-0350-6867-8

As Editor

- John Clare Selected Poems (London: Faber & Faber, 2010) ISBN 978-0-571-27427-7
