= The Book of Traps and Lessons =

Album by Kae Tempest

Studio album by Kae Tempest
- Released: 14 June 2019
- Genre: Spoken word
- Length: 45:03
- Label: Fiction; American
- Producer: Dan Carey; Noah Goldstein; Rick Rubin

Kae Tempest chronology
Let Them Eat Chaos (2016)	The Book of Traps and Lessons (2019)	The Line Is a Curve (2022)

Singles from The Book of Traps and Lessons
- 1. "People's Faces" Released: 12 September 2019

The Book of Traps and Lessons is the third studio album by English poet and spoken word artist Kae Tempest, the follow-up to Let Them Eat Chaos. According to NME's El Hunt: "The figures closest to this record’s protagonist constantly take the form of gnarled trees: fingers become delicate twiglets, and naked toes set down roots. And togetherness is the force that continually grounds ‘The Book of Traps and Lessons’ despite the dystopian soldiers that march across its drenched landscape." The spoken word lyrics contain a mix of hope and love, mirrored against the difficulties in today's society.

== Critical reception ==
Professional ratings
Aggregate scores
Source	Rating
AnyDecentMusic?	7.8/10
Metacritic	84/100
Review scores
Source	Rating
AllMusic	4.5/5 stars
DIY	4/5 stars
The Guardian	4/5 stars
The Independent	3/5 stars
Mojo	4/5 stars
NME	4/5 stars
The Observer	4/5 stars

According to review aggregator Metacritic, The Book of Traps and Lessons has a score of 84 out of 100, indicating "universal acclaim".

== Track listing ==
The Book of Traps and Lessons track listing
No.	Title	Length
1.	"Thirsty"	3:26
2.	"Keep Moving Don't Move"	5:49
3.	"Brown Eyed Man"	3:05
4.	"Three Sided Coin"	4:02
5.	"I Trap You"	3:32
6.	"All Humans Too Late"	3:06
7.	"Hold Your Own"	4:07
8.	"Lessons"	4:04
9.	"Firesmoke"	3:34
10.	"Holy Elixir"	4:56
11.	"People's Faces"	5:17

== Charts ==
Chart performance of The Book of Traps and Lessons
Chart (2016)	Peak position
Belgian Albums (Ultratop Flanders)	29
Swiss Albums (Schweizer Hitparade)	31
UK Albums (OCC)	30
UK R&B Albums (OCC)	1
