= Everybody Down =

Studio album by Kae Tempest
- Released: 19 May 2014
- Genre: Spoken word; hip-hop
- Length: 48:31
- Label: Big Dada
- Producer: Dan Carey

Kae Tempest chronology
Everybody Down (2014)	Let Them Eat Chaos (2016)

Professional ratings
Aggregate scores
Source	Rating
Metacritic	77/100
Review scores
Source	Rating
AllMusic	4/5 stars
Clash	8/10
Drowned in Sound	7/10
The Guardian	4/5 stars
NME	4/5 stars

Everybody Down is the debut album by English poet and spoken word artist Kae Tempest, which was nominated for the 2014 Mercury Prize. Its tracks comprise a unified story cycle with a coherent narrative arc, based upon a main character named Becky.

== Critical reception ==
According to review aggregator Metacritic, Everybody Down has a score of 77 out of 100, indicating "generally favorable reviews".

Luke Beardsworth of Drowned in Sound gave the album a 7 out of 10, writing, "Everybody Down is powerful and gritty and it tackles subjects such as sex work and drug deals with wit and subtlety beyond measure."

== Track listing ==
No.	Title	Length
1.	"Marshall Law"	5:28
2.	"The Truth"	3:33
3.	"Lonely Daze"	3:58
4.	"Chicken"	2:47
5.	"The Beigeness"	3:09
6.	"Theme from Becky"	3:56
7.	"Stink"	2:46
8.	"The Heist"	3:55
9.	"To the Victor the Spoils"	3:01
10.	"Circles"	5:06
11.	"A Hammer"	3:42
12.	"Happy End"	7:15

== Charts ==
Chart (2014)	Peak position
UK Independent Albums (OCC)	20
UK Albums (OCC)	94
