= Tall Lighthouse =

Tall Lighthouse is an independent publishing house in the UK, established in 1999 by Les Robinson. It publishes full collections of poetry, pamphlets, and the anthology City Lighthouse, a collection of poems by established and emerging poets alike, having featured work by Maurice Riordan, Hugo Williams, Daljit Nagra and Roddy Lumsden, among others. The press has established itself as a leading light on the small press poetry scene, four of its pamphlet publications having received the Poetry Book Society's Pamphlet Choice Award in Spring 2006, Summer and Winter 2008, and Spring 2009. The press was founded by Les Robinson in 1999, and run by Robinson until 2011, when he stepped down in favor of Gareth Lewis. Robinson returned to the director's role after Lewis died in 2016.

== Authors ==
Poets published by Tall Lighthouse include Sarah Howe, Helen Mort, Rhian Edwards, Aoife Mannix, Baden Prince, Pierre Ringwald, Heather Taylor, Alan Buckley, Ben Parker and Jodie Hollander. A number of young poets (under 30) are also published as part of the press's Pilot series.

== Pilot Series ==
The Pilot series is a project started by Tall Lighthouse in 2007, aimed at publishing poetry pamphlets by eighteen poets under the age of 30, under the editorship of Roddy Lumsden. The project attracted Arts Council funding, and has so far met with success, two of the five Eric Gregory Award winners for 2008 being Pilot series featured poets.

The poets published as part of the series to date are:

- 2007 Abi Curtis, Adam O'Riordan, Camellia Stafford, Gareth Jones, Jay Bernard and Miriam Gamble
- 2008 John McCullough, Retta Bowen, Kate Potts, Vidyan Ravinthiran, Ben Wilkinson and Emily Berry
- 2009 Amy Key, Sarah Howe, Charlotte Runcie, Richard O'Brien, Ailbhe Darcy and Simon Pomery

Five of the Pilot poets were also chosen to feature at 2009's StAnza, Scotland's International Poetry Festival, held in St Andrews.
