= Next Generation poets (2014) =

List of poets compiled by the Poetry Book Society

Next Generation poets (2014) are a list of poets named in 2014 by a panel for the Poetry Book Society, which once every ten years selects 20 poets "expected to dominate the poetry landscape of the coming decade." The accolade highlights emerging poets in the UK and Ireland who published a first collection of poetry within the previous decade.

The judges who compiled the list were: poet and broadcaster Ian McMillan (chair), poet and playwright Caroline Bird; Robert Crawford, from the 1994 New Generation Poets list; poet Clare Pollard; and Paul Farley, one of 2004's Next Generation Poets list. The British Council collaborated with the Poetry Book Society on an international showcase of the chosen poets.

The Next Generation 2014 list comprises:

- Tara Bergin
- Emily Berry
- Sean Borodale
- Adam Foulds
- Annie Freud
- Alan Gillis
- Rebecca Goss
- Jen Hadfield
- Emma Jones
- Luke Kennard
- Melissa Lee-Houghton
- Hannah Lowe
- Kei Miller
- Helen Mort
- Daljit Nagra
- Heather Phillipson
- Kae Tempest
- Mark Waldron
- Sam Willetts
- Jane Yeh

== See also ==
- New Generation poets (1994)
- Next Generation poets (2004)
