= The Line Is a Curve =

2022 studio album by Kae Tempest

Studio album by Kae Tempest
- Released: 8 April 2022
- Genre: Spoken word; hip-hop; poetry; electronic
- Length: 44:54
- Label: Fiction
- Producer: Dan Carey; Rick Rubin; Grian Chatten; Kae Tempest

Kae Tempest chronology
The Book of Traps and Lessons (2019)	The Line Is a Curve (2022)	Self Titled (2025)

Singles from The Line Is a Curve
- 1. "More Pressure" Released: 10 January 2022; 2. "Salt Coast" Released: 4 February 2022; 3. "No Prizes" Released: 7 March 2022; 4. "I Saw Light" Released: 30 March 2022

The Line Is a Curve is the fourth studio album by English poet and spoken word artist Kae Tempest. It was released on 8 April 2022, through Fiction Records. The album features collaborations with Kevin Abstract of Brockhampton, Grian Chatten of Fontaines D.C., and Lianne La Havas, among others.

== Critical reception ==
The Line Is a Curve ratings
Aggregate scores
Source	Rating
AnyDecentMusic?	7.9/10
Metacritic	84/100
Review scores
Source	Rating
AllMusic	4.5/5 stars
Clash	7/10
DIY	4/5 stars
The Guardian	4/5 stars
Pitchfork	7/10
musicOMH	4/5 stars
NME	4/5 stars

According to the review aggregator Metacritic, The Line Is a Curve received "universal acclaim" based on a weighted average score of 84 out of 100 from 12 critic scores.

== Track listing ==
The Line Is a Curve track listing
No.	Title	Length
1.	"Priority Boredom"	2:44
2.	"I Saw Light" (featuring Grian Chatten)	3:02
3.	"Nothing to Prove"	3:26
4.	"No Prizes" (featuring Lianne La Havas)	4:16
5.	"Salt Coast"	5:52
6.	"Don't You Ever"	3:03
7.	"These Are the Days"	4:01
8.	"Smoking" (featuring Confucius MC)	4:18
9.	"Water in the Rain" (featuring Assia Ghendir)	3:52
10.	"Move"	2:23
11.	"More Pressure" (featuring Kevin Abstract)	3:13
12.	"Grace"	4:32
Total length:		44:54

== Charts ==
Chart performance for The Line Is a Curve
Chart (2022)	Peak position
Belgian Albums (Ultratop Flanders)	16
Scottish Albums (OCC)	4
Swiss Albums (Schweizer Hitparade)	33
UK Albums (OCC)	8
UK R&B Albums (OCC)	1
