= Jean Sprackland =

English poet and writer

Jean Sprackland (born 1962) is an English poet and writer, the author of six collections of poetry and three books of essays about place and nature. She has won the Costa Poetry Award and the Portico Prize for Non Fiction, among other accolades.

== Biography ==
Originally from Burton upon Trent, Jean Sprackland studied English and Philosophy at the University of Kent at Canterbury, then taught for a few years before beginning to write poetry at age 30. Since 2015 she has been Professor of Creative Writing at Manchester Metropolitan University, and was Chair of the Poetry Archive from 2016 to 2020.

== Published works ==
- Tattoos for Mothers Day (Spike, 1997)
- Hard Water (Cape, 2003)
- Ellipsis: Vol. I (with Sean O'Brien and Tim Cooke; Comma Press, 2005)
- Our Thoughts are Bees: Working with Writers and Schools (with Mandy Coe; Wordplay Press, 2005)
- Tilt (Cape, 2007)
- Strands: A Year of Discoveries on the Beach (Cape, 2012)
- Sleeping Keys (Random House, 2013)
- Green Noise (Cape, 2018)
- These Silent Mansions: A life in graveyards (Cape, 2020)
- Night Vision: In search of the true dark (Cape, 2025)
- Goyle, Chert, Mire (Cape, 2026)

== Translated works ==
- Inclinación. Spanish translation of Tilt (Komorebi Ediciones, Chile, 2018)

== Awards and honours ==
- 1998: Forward Poetry Prize (Best First Collection) shortlist, Tattoos for Mothers Day
- 2003: T. S. Eliot Prize shortlist, Hard Water
- 2003: Whitbread Poetry Award shortlist, Hard Water
- 2004: Next Generation poet
- 2007: Costa Poetry Award, Tilt
- 2007: Forward Poetry Prize (Best Single Poem) shortlist, "The Birkdale Nightingale"
- 2012: Portico Prize for Literature (Non-fiction), Strands: A Year of Discoveries on the Beach
- 2021: PEN Ackerley Prize shortlist, These Silent Mansions: A life in graveyards
- 2021: Fellow of the Royal Society of Literature
