= Pascale Petit (poet) =

French-born British poet (born 1953)

Pascale Petit FRSL
- Born: 20 December 1953 (age 72); Paris, France
- Education: Royal College of Art
- Occupation: Poet
- Writing career
- Language: English
- Period: 1994–present
- Notable work: Mama Amazonica (2017)
- Notable awards: Ondaatje Prize, 2018; Laurel Prize for Poetry, 2020
- Website: pascalepetit.co.uk

Pascale Petit (born 20 December 1953), is a French-born British poet of French, Welsh and Indian heritage. She was born in Paris and grew up in France and Wales. She trained as a sculptor at the Royal College of Art and was a visual artist for the first part of her life. She has travelled widely, particularly in the Peruvian and Venezuelan Amazon and India.

Petit has published one novel and nine poetry collections, four of which were shortlisted for the T. S. Eliot Prize. Her seventh collection Mama Amazonica won the Ondaatje Prize in 2018 and the inaugural Laurel Prize for Poetry in 2020. In 2018, Petit was elected as a Fellow of the Royal Society of Literature (FRSL).

== Career ==
Petit has published one novel My Hummingbird Father (2024) and nine poetry collections: Heart of a Deer (1998), The Zoo Father (2001), The Huntress (2005), The Treekeeper's Tale (2008), What the Water Gave Me: Poems After Frida Kahlo (2010), Fauverie (2014), Mama Amazonica (2017), Tiger Girl (2020) and Beast (2025). She also published a pamphlet of poems The Wounded Deer: Fourteen Poems After Frida Kahlo (2005). For her work in poetry, she has received many awards, including the Cholmondeley Award, four from Arts Council England and three from the Society of Authors.

Petit was shortlisted for the Forward Best Single Poem Prize after publishing "The Strait-Jackets" (from The Zoo Father) and in 2001 she was one of ten poets commissioned by BBC Radio 4 to write a poem for National Poetry Day. The Zoo Father (2001) was a Poetry Book Society Recommendation. The Zoo Father (2001), The Huntress (2005), What the Water Gave Me: Poems After Frida Kahlo (2010), and Fauverie (2014) were all shortlisted for the T. S. Eliot Prize. Three books were selected as "books of the year" in The Observer, The Times Literary Supplement and The Independent. What the Water Gave Me and Tiger Girl were both shortlisted for the Wales Book of the Year.

Petit's 2017 collection, Mama Amazonica, won the inaugural Laurel Prize for Poetry 2020, the 2018 Ondaatje Prize, was a Poetry Book Society Choice, and was shortlisted for the Roehampton Poetry Prize. Her 2020 collection Tiger Girl was shortlisted for the Forward Prize for Best Collection.

The Zoo Father is published in a bilingual edition in Mexico and distributed in Spain and Latin America. Fauverie is published by Le Castor Astral in Paris in a bilingual edition. Her books have been translated into Chinese, Serbian, Spanish (in Mexico) and French. She has also translated the poems of a number of contemporary Chinese poets including Yang Lian, Wang Xiaoni and Zhai Yongming. She was Poetry Editor of Poetry London from 1990 to 2005, a Royal Literary Fund Fellow at Middlesex University from 2007 to 2009 and a Royal Literary Fund Fellow at the Courtauld Institute of Art in 2011–12. She tutored poetry courses for Tate Modern for nine years, and currently tutors for the Arvon Foundation, the Poetry School and Literature Wales. The Poetry Book Society selected her as one of the 2004 Next Generation Poets, a promotional listing for spotlighting notable young to middle aged British poets. Petit became a Fellow of the Royal Society of Literature in 2018.

== Reception ==
The Australian poet Les Murray has praised her work in The Times Literary Supplement, where he wrote: "No other British poet I am aware of can match the powerful mythic imagination of Pascale Petit." Jackie Kay in The Observer wrote: "Pascale's poems are as fresh as paint, and make you look all over again at Frida and her brilliant and tragic life." Ruth Padel, reviewing What the Water Gave Me: Poems After Frida Kahlo in The Guardian wrote: "Petit's collection is not a verse biography, but a hard-hitting, palette-knife evocation of the effect that bus crash had on Kahlo's life and work. 'And this is how I started painting. / Time stretched out its spectrum / and screeched its brakes.' WH Auden, in his elegy for Yeats, tells the Irish poet: 'Mad Ireland hurt you into poetry.' Petit's collection, exploring the way trauma hurts an artist into creation, celebrates the rebarbative energy with which Kahlo redeemed pain and transformed it into paint."

== Awards, prizes and fellowships ==
- 2000 – "The Strait-Jackets" (from The Zoo Father) shortlisted for Forward Best Single Poem Prize
- 2001 – New London Writers' Award
- 2001 – Arts Council England Writers' Award
- 2001 – The Zoo Father Poetry Book Society Recommendation
- 2001 – The Zoo Father shortlisted for T. S. Eliot Prize
- 2005 – The Huntress shortlisted for T. S. Eliot Prize
- 2005 – Arts Council England Grants for the Arts Award
- 2006 – Arts Council England Grants for the Arts Award
- 2006 – Society of Author's Author's Foundation Award
- 2007–09 – Royal Literary Fund Fellow at Middlesex University
- 2010 – What the Water Gave Me shortlisted for T. S. Eliot Prize
- 2011 – What the Water Gave Me shortlisted for Wales Book of the Year
- 2011 – Royal Literary Fund Fellowship at Courtauld Institute of Art
- 2013 – Manchester Poetry Prize for five poems from Fauverie
- 2014 – Fauverie shortlisted for T. S. Eliot Prize
- 2015 – Cholmondeley Award
- 2016 – Arts Council England Grants for the Arts Award
- 2017 – Mama Amazonica was Poetry Book Society Choice
- 2018 – Mama Amazonica won the Ondaatje Prize
- 2018 – Mama Amazonica shortlisted for Roehampton Poetry Prize
- 2018 – Literature Matters Award from the Royal Society of Literature
- 2018 – Fellow of the Royal Society of Literature
- 2020 – Indian Paradise Flycatcher won Keats-Shelley Prize for Poetry
- 2020 – Mama Amazonica won the inaugural Laurel Prize for Poetry
- 2020 – Tiger Girl shortlisted for Forward Prize for Best Collection
- 2021 – Tiger Girl shortlisted for Wales Book of the Year (Poetry)
- 2025 – Beast was a Poetry Book Society Recommendation

== Bibliography ==
=== Poetry ===
Collections

- Icefall climbing. Huddersfield: Smith/Doorstep. 1994.
- Heart of a Deer (Enitharmon, 1998)
- The Zoo Father (Seren, 2001)
- El Padre Zoológico/The Zoo Father (El Tucan, Mexico City, 2004)
- The Huntress (Seren, 2005)
- The Wounded Deer: Fourteen poems after Frida Kahlo, pamphlet (Smith Doorstop, 2005)
- The Treekeeper's Tale (Seren, 2008)
- What the Water Gave Me: Poems after Frida Kahlo (Seren, UK, 2010, Black Lawrence Press, US, 2011)
- Fauverie (Seren, 2014)
- Mama Amazonica (Bloodaxe, 2017)
- Tiger Girl (Bloodaxe, 2020)
- My Hummingbird Father, a novel (Salt Publishing, 2024)
- Beast (Bloodaxe Books, 2025)

List of poems

Title	Year	First published	Reprinted/collected
The Children's Asylum	2003	Petit, Pascale (July–August 2003). "The Children's Asylum". Quadrant. 47 (7–8 [398]): 76.	
The feast	2003	Petit, Pascale (July–August 2003). "The feast". Quadrant. 47 (7–8 [398]): 77.	
Portrait of my mother as Xipe Totec	2003	Petit, Pascale (July–August 2003). "Portrait of my mother as Xipe Totec". Quadrant. 47 (7–8 [398]): 76.	
The mineral mother	2003	Petit, Pascale (July–August 2003). "The mineral mother". Quadrant. 47 (7–8 [398]): 83.	
The orchid hunter	2003	Petit, Pascale (July–August 2003). "The orchid hunter". Quadrant. 47 (7–8 [398]): 97.	

Anthologies (edited)

- Tying the Song – co-editor with Mimi Khalvati (Enitharmon, 2000)
- Poetry from Art at Tate Modern – editor, pamphlet (Tate Publications, 2010)

=== Critical studies and reviews of Petit's work ===
Mama Amazonica

- Van Hek, Lin (January–February 2018). "Poetry of wildness". Quadrant. 62 (1–2 [543]): 85–86.
- Nilanjana Roy"In Praise of Pascale Petit, a poet breaking into new territory", Financial Times, 25 May 2018.

———————

Bibliography notes
