= Rory Waterman =

Poet and academic from Northern Ireland

- Born: Belfast, Northern Ireland
- Occupations: Poet, academic

Academic background
- Education: University of Leicester, Durham University
- Website: www.rorywaterman.com

Rory Waterman (born in Belfast, 1981) is a poet, critic, editor and academic resident in Nottingham, England.

== Early life ==
Waterman lived in Coleraine, County Londonderry until the age of two, then grew up mainly in Nocton, Lincolnshire with his mother and grandmother, then in Metheringham, with long stays in Coleraine in Northern Ireland from the age of 10, to see his father. He then took degrees in English at the University of Leicester and Durham University.

== Career ==
Waterman is Professor of Modern Literature and Creative Writing at Nottingham Trent University, and co-edits the poetry pamphlet press New Walk Editions, with Nick Everett at the University of Leicester. He is also a critic and reviewer, writing regularly for the Times Literary Supplement, PN Review, and other publications, and the author of several books of literary criticism. His poetry has been shortlisted for a Ledbury Forte Prize and a Seamus Heaney Prize, and has been made a PBS Recommendation.

In addition to his four collections with Carcanet, his poems have appeared in the New Statesman, The Guardian, The Financial Times, and various other magazines and newspapers, as well as a number of anthologies, including The Best British Poetry and The Forward Book of Poetry. The Manchester Review wrote that 'Rory Waterman's first complete collection, Tonight the Summer’s Over was much lauded, seen as "the best first collection for the past couple of years" and was a PBS recommendation. The splendidly titled Brexit Day on the Balmoral Estate is a fine widening out of subject matter.' The TLS, reviewing his second book, commended him for a 'seriousness of form and subject uncommon among his generation', and describes his work as 'subversive – and substantial.' His most recent collection, Come Here to This Gate, was described as 'A wise and deeply satisfying collection' in The Guardian. His critical essays have appeared in Essays in Criticism, English, Poetry Review, PN Review, and elsewhere, and a selection was published in 2024, in his book Endless Present: Selected Articles, Reviews and Dispatches, 2010-2023.

== Books ==
=== Poetry ===
- Come Here to This Gate (Carcanet Press, 2024)
- Sweet Nothings (Carcanet Press, 2020)
- Sarajevo Roses (Carcanet Press, 2017) - shortlisted for the Ledbury Forte Prize 2019
- Brexit Day on the Balmoral Estate (Rack Press, 2017) - pamphlet
- Tonight the Summer's Over (Carcanet Press, 2013) - Poetry Book Society Recommendation, shortlisted for Seamus Heaney Prize 2014

=== Prose and criticism ===
- Devils in the Details: On Location with Folk Tales in England's Forgotten County (Five Leaves, 2026)
- Endless Present: Selected Articles, Reviews and Dispatches, 2010-23 (Shoestring Press, 2024)
- Wendy Cope (Liverpool University Press, 2021)
- Poets of the Second World War (Liverpool University Press, 2016)
- Belonging and Estrangement in the Poetry of Philip Larkin, R. S. Thomas and Charles Causley (Routledge, 2014)

=== Edited by ===
- with Anna Milon, Lincolnshire Folk Tales Reimagined (Five Leaves, 2025)
- with Anthony Caleshu, Poetry & Covid-19 (Shearsman, 2021)
- W. H. Davies: Essays on the Super-Tramp Poet (Anthem, 2021)
- with David Belbin, 25 (Shoestring, 2019)
- Something Happens, Sometimes Here: Contemporary Lincolnshire Poets (Five Leaves, 2015)
- W. H. Davies, The True Traveller: A Reader (Carcanet/Fyfield Books, 2015)
