= Michael Mackmin =

British poet and editor

- Born: 1941 (age 84–85); Croydon, London
- Known for: Founding and editing The Rialto

Michael Mackmin (born 1941) is a British poet and editor. He was a founding, and is now the sole, editor of poetry magazine The Rialto.

== Poetry ==
Mackmin's first poetry collection, The Play of Rainbow, was published in January 1970. Mackmin had submitted it to the publishers, Cape Goliard Press, whose acceptance of it marked the first time they had ever taken an unsolicited manuscript. They described Mackmin as having "absorbed himself in the best of the English lyrical tradition while at the same time attuning himself to the finest contemporary lyrical writers of England and America." His poetry has also been published in magazines including Transatlantic Review and THE SHOp: A Magazine of Poetry.

In 1978, Mackmin published The Connemara Shore.

In 1994, words by Mackmin accompanied photographs by Patrick Sutherland in a Maidstone exhibition exploring the changing face of Kent.

In 2006, Mackin's Twenty-Three Poems, was published by HappenStance. From There to Here (2011), also published by HappenStance, was described in Ambit as "a beautiful little book", and its poems as "meandering and direct, magical and realistic at the same time".

AND (Poems 1920-2017) was published in 2017.

== The Rialto ==
Mackmin was a founding editor of poetry magazine The Rialto, first published in 1984. The first issue contained work by 33 writers, including 21 from East Anglia, its region of publication. These included George Barker, Oliver Bernard, Glen Cavaliero, Dick Davis and Ida Affleck Graves. Other contributors included Margaret Atwood, Carol Ann Duffy, Gavin Ewart, Maggie Gee, Miroslav Holub, and Alexis Lykiard.

The Rialto continued a tradition of East Anglian poetry publishing begun by Samphire, a poetry magazine founded in 1968, which had ceased publication three years before The Rialto was founded. It has been described as "one of the most respected outlets in the UK", providing "an eclectic mix of high quality verse in short snatches".

George Szirtes' poem "Meeting Austerlitz" was first published in The Rialto 51.

With fellow poet Matt Howard, Mackmin founded the RSPB & The Rialto Nature Poetry Competition.

The Rialto was awarded The Exceptional Contribution Award "for outstanding work within writing and publishing in the region" at the East Anglian Book Awards 2022.

In 2023, Mackmin edited the anthology Poetry with an Axe to Grind: A Celebration of the One Hundredth Issue of The Rialto, described by the TLS as a "quirky affair".
