= Let Them Eat Chaos =

Studio album by Kae Tempest
- Released: 7 October 2016
- Genre: Spoken word; political hip-hop; poetry; electronic; conscious hip-hop
- Length: 47:43
- Label: Fiction; Lex
- Producer: Dan Carey

Kae Tempest chronology
Everybody Down (2014)	Let Them Eat Chaos (2016)	The Book of Traps and Lessons (2019)

Singles from Let Them Eat Chaos
- 1. "Europe Is Lost" Released: 25 November 2015

Let Them Eat Chaos is the second studio album by English poet and spoken word artist Kae Tempest, the follow-up to his Mercury Prize-nominated debut Everybody Down. The album follows seven individuals who all live on the same street who have never met each other before. But then at 4:18 in the morning, a storm causes these seven people to leave their homes and see each other for the very first time.

== Critical reception ==
Professional ratings
Aggregate scores
Source	Rating
AnyDecentMusic?	7.9/10
Metacritic	84/100
Review scores
Source	Rating
AllMusic	5/5 stars
DIY	4/5 stars
Financial Times	4/5 stars
The Guardian	4/5 stars
The Independent	4/5 stars
Mojo	4/5 stars
The Observer	5/5 stars
Q	4/5 stars
The Times	4/5 stars
Uncut	6/10

According to review aggregator Metacritic, Let Them Eat Chaos has a score of 84 out of 100, indicating "universal acclaim".

== Track listing ==
No.	Title	Length
1.	"Picture a Vacuum"	2:47
2.	"Lionmouth Door Knocker"	2:44
3.	"Ketamine for Breakfast"	3:10
4.	"Europe Is Lost"	5:31
5.	"We Die"	3:24
6.	"Whoops"	3:38
7.	"Brews"	0:47
8.	"Don't Fall In"	2:50
9.	"Pictures on a Screen"	5:05
10.	"Perfect Coffee"	5:31
11.	"Grubby"	4:07
12.	"Breaks"	2:42
13.	"Tunnel Vision"	5:15

== Charts ==
Chart (2016)	Peak position
Belgian Albums (Ultratop Flanders)	148
German Albums (Offizielle Top 100)	74
Scottish Albums (OCC)	34
Swiss Albums (Schweizer Hitparade)	71
UK Albums (OCC)	28
UK R&B Albums (OCC)	1
