= Self Titled (Kae Tempest album) =

Studio album by Kae Tempest
- Released: 4 July 2025
- Genre: Spoken word; conscious hip-hop
- Length: 40:26
- Label: Island
- Producer: Fraser T. Smith; Kae Tempest

Kae Tempest chronology
The Line Is a Curve (2022)	Self Titled (2025)

Singles from Self Titled
- 1. "Statue in the Square" Released: 19 March 2025; 2. "Know Yourself" Released: 30 April 2025; 3. "Diagnoses" Released: 23 June 2025

Self Titled is the fifth studio album by English poet and spoken word artist Kae Tempest. It was released on 4 July 2025, through Island Records. The album features collaborations with Neil Tennant, Tawiah, Connie Constance, and Young Fathers.

== Promotion ==
=== Singles ===
On 19 March 2025, Tempest released "Statue in the Square" which would become the album's first single. The track was premiered on Nick Grimshaw's BBC Radio 6 Music show.

The second single "Know Yourself" was released on 30 April 2025 alongside the album's announcement.

"Diagnoses" was released as the album's third and final single on 23 June 2025.

== Critical reception ==
Self Titled ratings
Aggregate scores
Source	Rating
AnyDecentMusic?	7.9/10
Metacritic	85/100
Review scores
Source	Rating
AllMusic	4/5 stars
Clash	8/10
DIY	4.5/5 stars
The Guardian	4/5 stars
The Independent	4/5 stars
musicOMH	4.5/5 stars
NME	4/5 stars
Uncut	8/10

According to the review aggregator Metacritic, Self Titled received "universal acclaim" based on a weighted average score of 85 out of 100 from 8 critic scores.

== Track listing ==
All tracks are written by Kae Tempest and Fraser T. Smith, with additional writers noted.

Self Titled track listing
No.	Title	Writer(s)	Length
1.	"I Stand on the Line"		3:38
2.	"Statue in the Square"		2:54
3.	"Know Yourself"	Tom Rowlands	2:40
4.	"Sunshine on Catford"		3:10
5.	"Bless the Bold Future"	Tawiah	3:42
6.	"Everything All Together"		1:52
7.	"Prayers to Whisper"		3:34
8.	"Diagnoses"	Rowlands	2:53
9.	"Hyperdistillation"	Constance Power	4:09
10.	"Forever"		2:28
11.	"Breathe"	Kayus Bankole; Graham Hastings; Alloysious Massaquoi	5:53
12.	"Till Morning"		3:33
Total length:			40:26

== Personnel ==
Credits adapted from Tidal.

- Kae Tempest – vocals
- Fraser T. Smith – keyboards, piano, production, mixing (all tracks); bass programming, drum programming (tracks 1–11); bass guitar (6, 9, 10, 12), electric guitar (6, 10)
- Matt Colton – mastering
- Louis Rogove – engineering
- Scott Barnett – engineering (1–5, 7–12)
- Raven Bush – string arrangement, strings (1, 3, 4, 6–10)
- Giles Kwakeulati King-Ashong – drums (1, 3, 4, 6, 7, 9–11)
- Isabel Gracefield – engineering (1, 3, 6, 7, 9–12)
- Sheila Maurice-Grey – horn arrangement, trumpet (1, 6, 10, 12)
- Chelsea Carmichael – saxophone (1, 6, 10, 12)
- Anoushka Nanguy – trombone (1, 6, 10, 12)
- Theon Cross – tuba (1, 6, 10, 12)
- Molly J – background vocals (2, 6, 7, 9, 10)
- Tom Rowlands – production, bass programming, drum programming, keyboards (3, 8)
- Neil Tennant – additional vocals (4)
- Tawiah – additional vocals (5)
- Connie Constance – additional vocals (9)
- Alloysious Massaquoi – additional vocals (11)
- Graham Hastings – additional vocals (11)
- Kayus Bankole – additional vocals (11)

== Charts ==
Chart performance for Self Titled
Chart (2025)	Peak position
Belgian Albums (Ultratop Flanders)	50
Scottish Albums (OCC)	3
Swiss Albums (Schweizer Hitparade)	41
UK Albums (OCC)	25
UK R&B Albums (OCC)	1
