= Colin Simms =

British biologist, curator and poet (born 1939)

- Born: 1939 (age 86–87)
- Occupations: Biologist, curator, poet

Colin Simms (born 1939) is a British biologist, curator, and poet.

== Career ==
=== Biologist and curator ===
Simms was appointed Keeper of Biology at the Yorkshire Museum in 1964. He held this position until 1982.

=== Poet ===
Simms has produced several collections, and more than forty pamphlets, of poetry, inspired by wildlife and the natural world. These works were collected into a series of publications by Shearsman Books. The first publication was Otters and Martens in 2004, followed by The American Poems (2005), Gyrfalcon Poems (2007), Poems from Afghanistan (2013), and Hen Harrier Poems.

In a 2015 Guardian review of Hen Harrier Poems, Simms' poetry of the last half-century was described as of "huge importance, thrilling for the rigour and commitment of its vision". He won third prize in the inaugural Laurel Prize for environmental poetry in 2020, for Hen Harrier. He has also been described as "one of the greatest and most neglected of all Yorkshire’s poets of landscape."

== Selected publications ==
- 1968: "A List of Botanical and Zoological Collections at the Yorkshire Museum, York, The Naturalist 904.
- 1970: Lives of British Lizards, Goose and Son.
- 1973: Birches and Other Striplings, Headland Poetry.
- 1973: Modesty: Swaledale Summer), Headland Poetry.
- 1974: Horcum and Other Gods, Headland Poetry.
- 1976: No Northwestern Passage: A Long-Poem, Writers Forum.
- 1977: Parfleche, Galloping Dog Press.
- 1977: On Osgodby Cliffs: Poems for Cleveland, The Curlew Press.
- 1980: Missouri River Songs '75-'77, Genera.
- 1980: Movement, Pig Press.
- 1981: A Celebration of the Stones in a Water-course, Galloping Dog Press.
- 1987: Eyes Own Ideas, Pig Press.
- 2004: Otters and Martens, Shearsman Books.
- 2005: The American Poems, Shearsman Books.
- 2007: Gyrfalcon Poems, Shearsman Books.
- 2013: Poems from Afghanistan, Shearsman Books.
- 2015. Hen Harrier Poems, Shearsman Books.
