= Richard Moorhead =

Richard Lewis Moorhead OBE is a Professor of Law and Professional Ethics at the University of Exeter. He leads a team working on the British Post Office scandal (the Post Office Project) and that work led to Moorhead’s appointment to the Horizon Compensation Advisory Board. He gave the 2024 Hamlyn Lectures on "Frail Professionalism: Lawyers’ ethics after the Post Office and other cases".

Prior to his appointment at Exeter, Moorhead was the first Chair of Law and Professional Ethics and Vice Dean (Research) in the Faculty of Laws at University College London (UCL). His work focuses on lawyers, their ethics, regulation and professional competence. He is the co-editor of After Universalism: Re-Engineering Access to Justice. and co-author of In-House Lawyers' Ethics: Institutional Logics, Legal Risk and the Tournament of Influence.

He was elected to a Fellowship in the Academy of Social Sciences in 2019.

Moorhead is also a poet whose work has been featured in periodicals. His first pamphlet, the Reluctant Vegetarian (Oystercatcher Press) was shortlisted for the Michael Marks Award. His second, the Word Museum is published by Flarestack Poets and was also shortlisted

He was made OBE in the 2026 King's Birthday Honours.

== Books ==
- Moorhead, Richard, Steven Vaughan, and Cristina Godinho. In-house Lawyers' Ethics: Institutional Logics, Legal Risk and the Tournament of Influence, Oxford: Hart, 2019. ISBN 9781509905928
- Moorhead, Richard., ed. After Universalism: Re-engineering Access to Justice. Oxford: Blackwell Publ, 2003. OCLC 249031305
