= La Route du Rock =

Coordinates: 48.5886°N 1.9228°W

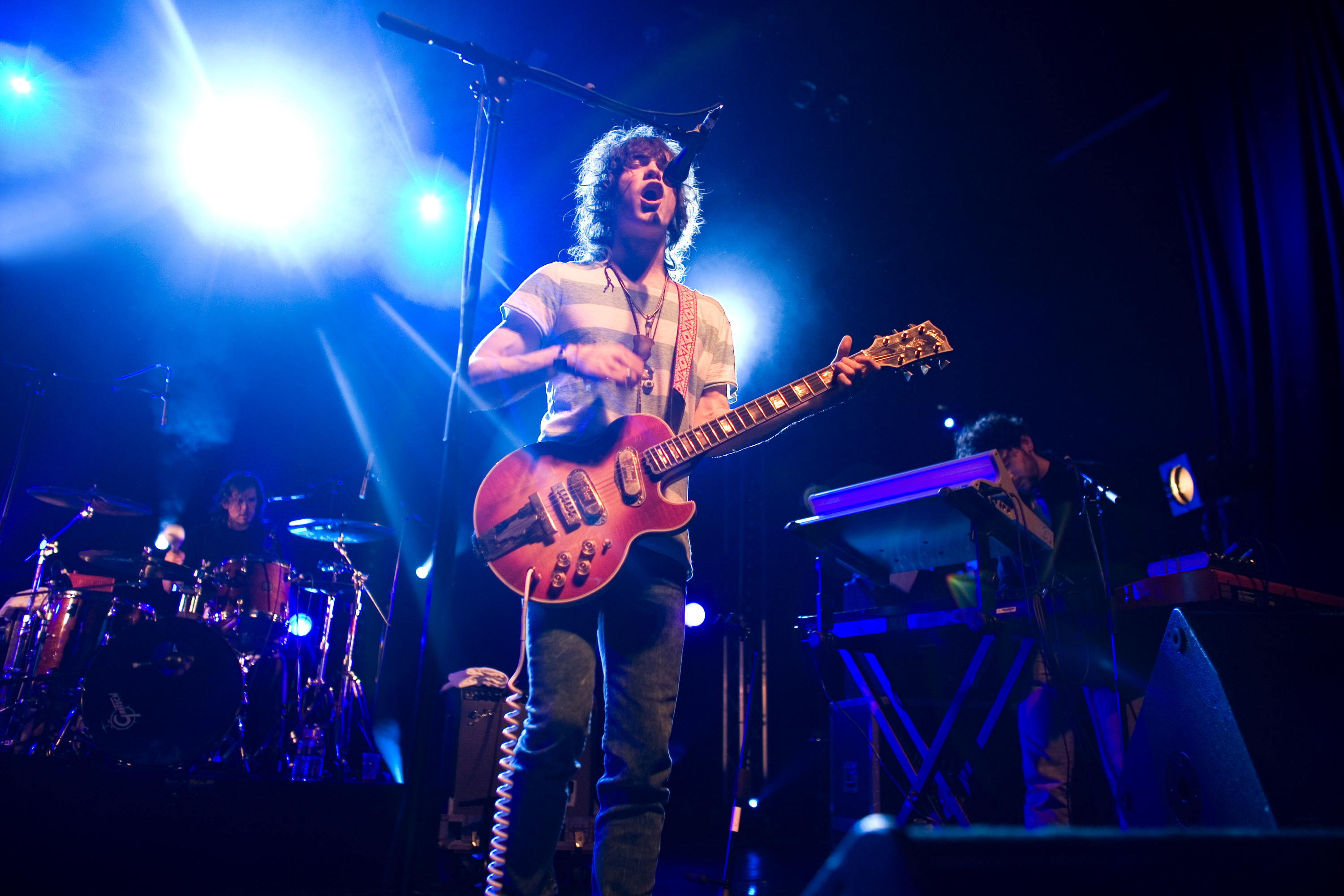
- MGMT performing at La Route du Rock 2008
- Genre: Rock music
- Dates: March and August each year
- Locations: Saint-Malo, Brittany, France
- Years active: 1991–present
- Attendance: 25,000
- Website: www.laroutedurock.com

La Route du Rock is a biannual music festival that occurs in the city of Saint-Malo, on the Brittany coast in France.

== History ==
The La Route du Rock's inaugural event was in 1991. Since 2006, it has also held a "Winter Collection" event in February or March.

Past events have featured artists such as Sonic Youth, Portishead, PJ Harvey, The Cure, Sigur Ros, My Bloody Valentine, Mogwai, TV On The Radio, and Tindersticks. MGMT performed at the 2008 event.

The 20th edition of La Route du Rock was held from 13 to 15 August 2010, featuring performances by Massive Attack, The Flaming Lips, The National, Caribou, and Liars, among others.

In 2019, the acts included Tame Impala, Metronomy, Black Midi, Hot Chip, Stereolab, Idles, Altın Gün, Fontaines D.C., and Deerhunter.

The 30th edition was held in 2022.

English spoken word poet, musician, and writer Kae Tempest appeared in 2024.

== Description ==
La Route du Rock is a music festival devoted to "Anglo-Saxon" rock music, held in the French coastal city of Saint-Malo. It attracts up to 25,000 attendees. The performances are staged on the beach during the day, and in the 18th-century Vauban castle Fort de Saint-Père, around 12 km (7.5 mi) south of the city, at night.

== See also ==
- List of music festivals
