= Linda France =

British poet, writer and editor (born 1958)

Linda France FRSL
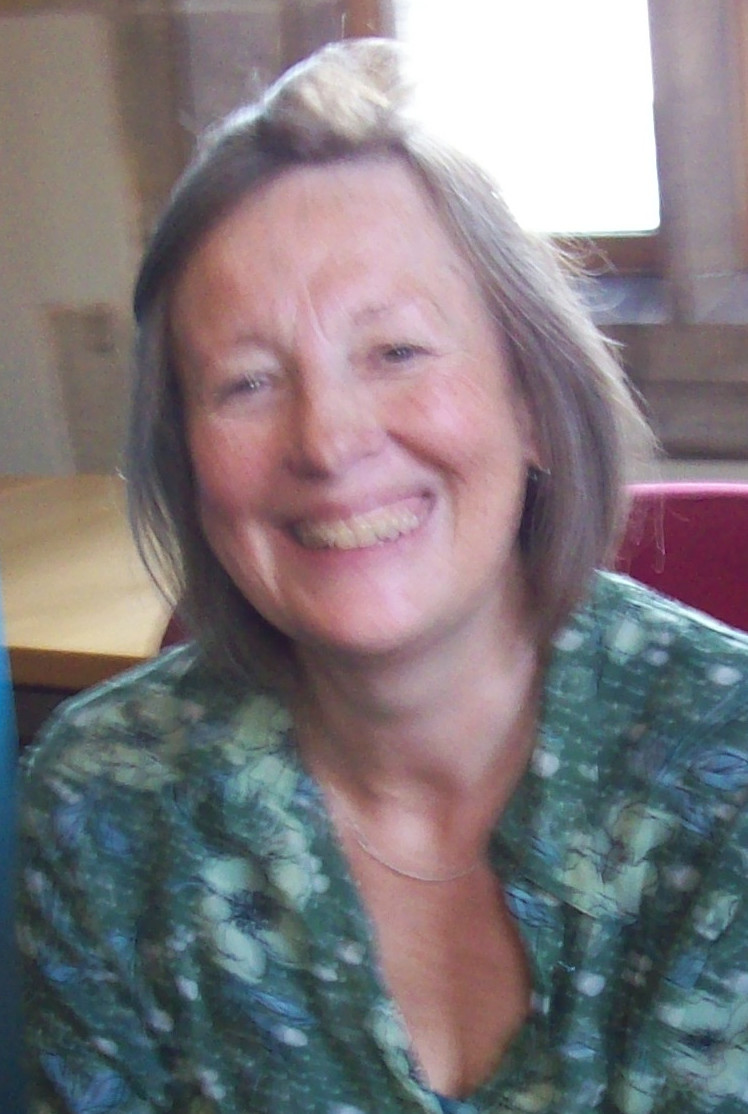
- France at the 2014 Durham Book Festival
- Born: 21 May 1958 (age 68); Wallsend, Newcastle upon Tyne, England
- Education: University of Leeds
- Occupation: Poet
- Writing career
- Notable work: Reading the Flowers
- Notable awards: National Poetry Competition
- Website: www.lindafrance.co.uk

Linda France is a British poet, writer and editor. She has published eight full-length poetry collections, a number of pamphlets, and was editor of the influential anthology, Sixty Women Poets. France is the author of The Toast of the Kit-Cat Club, a verse biography of the eighteenth-century traveler and social rebel, Lady Mary Wortley Montagu. She has won numerous awards and fellowships, including the National Poetry Competition in 2013 and the Laurel Prize in 2022.

== Early life and education ==
Linda France was born in Wallsend, Newcastle upon Tyne on 21 May 1958. When France was five years old, her family moved to Dorset, when her father's employer established a new paint manufacturing business. In an interview in 2016, France revealed that moving to Dorset, with its own unique dialect, was an influential moment in her life. She stated: "The effect of that linguistic shift made a writer out of me – the shedding of my native tongue (Geordie), and the language of the hearth to try to belong 'elsewhere' snapped a root that could never be mended and kept me, like most writers, on the edge, always the observer, the listener."

France attended the University of Leeds, studying English and History. After graduating, France lived in London and later moved to Amsterdam. In 1981, she returned to England, settling in Northumberland with her two sons. The family lived for ten years in a home without electricity.

== Career ==
France's work includes themes of landscape, nature, love and identity. In 1988 and 1989, France was awarded First Prize in the Bloodaxe Books Evening Chronicle Poetry Competition. She won a Northern Arts Fellowship at the Tyrone Guthrie Centre in Ireland in 1990. She published her first poetry collection, Red, (Bloodaxe Books) in 1992. France was editor of the well-known anthology, Sixty Women Poets, published by Bloodaxe in 1993.

France's second collection, The Gentleness of the Very Tall, was published by Bloodaxe in 1995 and was long-listed for the Los Angeles Times Book Prize. In 1997, Bloodaxe published Storyville, a collaboration authored by France, artist Birtley Aris and musicians Keith Morris and Lewis Watson. From 1998 to 2000, France was the recipient of a seven-month residency Fellowship at Fine Arts Work Center in Provincetown, Massachusetts, a one-month Hawthornden Fellowship, twice, and a Poetry Society poet Residency in Mowbray Park, Sunderland.

Bloodaxe published, France's Simultaneous Dress in 2002. France next authored a verse biography of eighteenth-century writer, traveler, and social rebel, Lady Mary Wortley Montagu, The Toast of the Kit-Cat Club: A Life of Lady Mary Wortley Montagu. The book was published by Bloodaxe in 2005.

In 2009, book of days, (ARC Publishing), France wrote a poem daily for a year. In 2010, ARC published France's,You are Her. Many of the poems in this collection deal with France's journey of grief and healing due to a serious horse-riding accident in 1995, and a number of deaths of close friends.

France's 2016 collection, Reading the Flowers is an exploration of thirteen famous Botanical Gardens. The poem, Bernard and Cerinthe, included in the collection, was awarded the National Poetry Competition in 2013.

France was inspired in 2018 to write the poem Portrait of the Artist as an Island Flower by the paintings of plants made by Margaret Dickinson around 1874 after visiting Lindisfarne with the Berwickshire Naturalists Club. France's research was part of her PhD on the subject Women on the Edge of Landscape. The creative component of her PhD became the collection The Knucklebone Floor. Published in 2022, The Knucklebone Floor won her the Laurel Prize.

She was the inaugural Environmental Poet of the Year 2022–23 in the Michael Marks Awards for Poetry Pamphlets for Letters to Katłįà published by The Wordsworth Trust.

She was elected a Fellow of the Royal Society of Literature in 2024.

France lives near Hadrian's Wall, near Corbridge, Northumberland. She teaches Creative Writing at Newcastle University.

== Poetry collections ==
- —(2022), Startling, Faber & New Writing North, ISBN 9780571379026
- —(2022), The Knucklebone Floor, Smokestack Books, ISBN 9781838465377
- —(2016), Reading the Flowers, ARC Publications, ISBN 9781910345498
- —(2010), You are Her, ARC Publications, ISBN 9781906570552
- —(2009), Book of Days, ARC Publications, ISBN 978-0956034137
- —(2002), The Simultaneous Dress, Bloodaxe Books ISBN 9781852245733
- —(1997), Storyville, Bloodaxe Books ISBN 978-1852243999
- —(1995), The Gentleness of the Very Tall, Bloodaxe Books, ISBN 9781852242879
- —(1992), Red, Bloodaxe Books, ISBN 9781852241780

== Selected publications ==
- —(1993), Sixty Women Poets, Bloodaxe Books, ISBN 9781852242527
- —(2005), The Toast of the Kit-Cat Club, Bloodaxe Books, ISBN 9781906188023

== Awards ==
- —(2013), National Poetry Competition, Bernard and Cerinthe
- —(1997), Tyrone Guthrie Award
- —(1994), Arts Foundation Poetry Fellowship
