= The Rialto (poetry magazine) =

English poetry magazine and publisher

The Rialto is an independent poetry magazine and poetry publisher. The magazine is published three times a year. It is part-funded by Arts Council England. First published in April 1984 in Norwich, Norfolk, the name was a result of a friend enquiring on "what news on the Rialto?" referring to progress with the publication and is a reference to William Shakespeare's The Merchant of Venice.

== Background ==
Michael Mackmin, John Wakeman and Jenny Roberts were the co-founders of the magazine, however Jenny Roberts left shortly after the seventh issue was produced. The initial print run was financed by an anonymous private source. The first edition included poetry by Margaret Atwood, George Barker, Steve Sant, Gavin Ewart and Miroslav Holub, and four poems by Carol Ann Duffy who went on to become Poet Laureate from 2009 to 2019.

In 1996 The Rialto made its first foray into book publishing, producing a limited run of "How it turned out" by Frank Redpath. Shortly after this John Wakeman left the magazine and moved to Cork in Ireland, where he started his poetry magazine The Shop. Michael Mackmin continues to be editor of the magazine, and has also presided over the publication of books and "Bridge Collections"; a series of pamphlets intended as a step towards a first collection, more of both are planned.

The Rialto is run by a network of staff. Michael Mackmin continues to act as editor, with editions also produced by assistant editors Will Harris, Rishi Dastidar, Edward Doegar and Degna Stone, and guest editors such as Ella Frears and Daljit Nagra. Nick Stone is the art director. Matthew Howard, Colin Hughes, Michael Mackmin and Nick Stone are Trustees.

The Rialto has an Advisory Board consisting of Rishi Dastidar, Matthew Howard, Colin Hughes, Claire Kidman, Michael Mackmin Esther Morgan and Nick Stone.

Cover art has included the likes of Barbara Hepworth, Patrick Sutherland, Paula Rego, Angie Lewin, Dee Nickerson and Eric Ravilious, as well as many pieces by new and emerging print-makers, artists and photographers.

The Rialto was awarded The Exceptional Contribution Award "for outstanding work within writing and publishing in the region" at the East Anglian Book Awards 2022.

== Pamphlets ==
- The Sea Turned Thick As Honey – Holly Singlehurst (2021)
- Queerfella – Simon Maddrell (2020)
- Fridge – Selima Hill (2020)
- Dodo Provocateur – Anita Pati (2019)
- you are mistaken - Sean Wai Keung (2017)
- Cold Fire - Anthology (2017)
- The Rainbow Faults - Kate Wakeling (2016)
- Wound - Richard Scott (2016, out of print)
- Unmapped - Emily Wills (2014)
- What I Saw - Laura Scott (2014, out of print)
- The Pair of Scissors That Would Cut Anything - Luke Samuel Yates (2013)
- A Bad Influence Girl - Janet Rogerson (2012, out of print)
- The Hungry Ghost Festival - Jen Campbell (2012, out of print)
- The Hitcher - Hannah Lowe (2011, out of print)
- The Night is Young - Peter Sansom (2009)
- Developing the Negative - Emily Wills (2008)
- The Magnolia - Richard Lambert (2008)
- Bye for Now - Lorraine Mariner (2005, out of print)

== Books ==
- Poetry with an Axe to Grind – Selected poems from 100 issues of The Rialto, edited by Michael Mackmin (2023)
- Gall - Matt Howard (2018) (Winner of "Best first collection" in the 2020 Laurel Prize)
- The Swan Machine - Dean Parkin (2016)
- Night Lightning - Julia Casterton (2007)
- Outswimming the Eruption - Allan Crosbie (2006)
- Billack's Bones - Joanna Guthrie (2007)
- The Prize - John Siddique (First Edition 2005, Second Edition 2006)
- The Doves of Finisterre - Julia Casterton (2003, out of print)
- Starlight on Water - Helena Nelson (2003, out of print)
- 2nd - Andrew Waterhouse (2002)
- Scarberry Hill - Josephine Dickinson (2001)
- Diverting the Sea - Emily Wills (2000, out of print)
- in - Andrew Waterhouse (2000, out of print)
- How it turned out - Frank Redpath (1996)
