= Helen Mort =

British poet and novelist

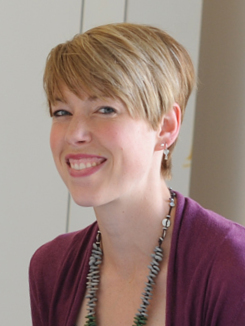
Helen Mort in 2014

Helen Mort FRSL (born 28 September 1985, Sheffield) is a British poet and novelist. She is a five-time winner of the Foyle Young Poets award, received an Eric Gregory Award from The Society of Authors in 2007, and won the Manchester Poetry Prize Young Writer Prize in 2008. In 2010, she became the youngest ever poet-in-residence at the Wordsworth Trust, Grasmere. In the same year she was shortlisted for the Picador Prize and won the Norwich Café Writers' Poetry Competition with a poem called "Deer". She was the Derbyshire Poet Laureate from 2013 to 2015. In 2014, she won the Fenton Aldeburgh First Collection Prize for "Division Street".

She is an alumna of Christ's College, Cambridge, from which she graduated with a degree in Social and Political Sciences in 2007. In 2014, she completed her Doctorate at Sheffield University with a Ph.D thesis in English/Neuroscience and her BlogSpot "Poetry on the Brain" was one of the Picador "Best Poetry Blogs" choices.

Her collection Division Street is published by Chatto & Windus and was shortlisted for the Costa Book Awards and the T.S. Eliot Prize. In a national survey, it was chosen by sixth-form groups and reading groups as their first choice collection. She has published two pamphlets with Tall Lighthouse press. In 2014 she was named as a Next Generation poet by the Poetry Book Society. In 2023 her memoir, A Line Above the Sky, which had previously won the Boardman Tasker Prize, won the Jon Wyte prize at the Banff International Mountain Literature Festival.

Mort is currently Professor of Creative Writing at Manchester Metropolitan University. She edited the Verse Matters anthology with Rachel Bower who is a Fellow at the University of Leeds. She has appeared on radio programmes such as The Verb, Poetry Please, and Woman's Hour. Individual poems have been published in the New Statesman, "Ex-Industrial (a trailer)", and the Sunday Times, "Admit you feel like all the ice skates in Brazil", as well as the magazines Poetry Review, Granta, The Rialto, Poetry London, The Manhattan Review, and The North.

In June 2018, Mort was elected Fellow of the Royal Society of Literature in its "40 Under 40" initiative.

In 2020, she discovered that innocent photos of her had been used to create pornographic deepfake images. The Guardian made a 2023 documentary film, My Blonde GF, about her experiences.

Preceded by David Smart (author)	Winner, Boardman Tasker Prize for Mountain Literature; 2022	Succeeded by Katie Brown
