= Cynthia Miller =

Cynthia Miller may refer to:

- Cynthia Miller-Idriss, American sociologist
- Cynthia Catlin Miller (1791–1883), American abolitionist
