= New Generation poets (1994) =

The New Generation Poets is a group of 1994 British poets whose work was featured in a month-long nationwide festival, many of the writers going on to considerable popular success. The 20 poets were chosen by a panel of judges comprising Melvyn Bragg (non-voting chair), poets Michael Longley and Vicki Feaver, literary critic James Wood, Margaret Busby (publisher and author) and John Osborne (Professor of American Studies at Hull University and editor of the poetry magazine Bête Noire).

The New Generation Poets were featured in an edition of The South Bank Show, presented by Melvyn Bragg, on 2 October 1994, and were also the focus of a special issue of Poetry Review.

The list of poets comprises:

- Moniza Alvi
- Simon Armitage
- John Burnside
- Robert Crawford
- David Dabydeen
- Michael Donaghy
- Carol Ann Duffy
- Ian Duhig
- Elizabeth Garrett
- Lavinia Greenlaw
- W. N. Herbert
- Michael Hofmann
- Mick Imlah
- Kathleen Jamie
- Jamie McKendrick
- Sarah Maguire
- Glyn Maxwell
- Don Paterson
- Pauline Stainer
- Susan Wicks.

== See also ==
- Next Generation poets (2004)
- Next Generation poets (2014)
