= Poetry Book Society =

Society devoted to poetry; founded in 1953 by T. S. Eliot and others

The Poetry Book Society (PBS) is a British subscription-based book club dedicated to selecting, recommending and publicising new poetry books. Every quarter, it selects two Poetry Book Society Choices and four Poetry Book Society Recommendations. Members receive copies of selected books plus a magazine.

== History ==
The Poetry Book Society was founded in 1953 by T. S. Eliot and friends, including Sir Basil Blackwell, "to propagate the art of poetry". Eric Walter White was secretary from December 1953 until 1971, and was subsequently the society's chairman. The PBS was chaired by Philip Larkin in the 1980s.

In 1993, the Society set up the annual T. S. Eliot Prize, awarded to the best new collection of English-language poetry from the United Kingdom or the Republic of Ireland. The Society continued to administer this award until 2016.

The Society ran its first New Generation Poets promotion in 1994. It organised two subsequent "Next Generation Poets" promotions, in 2004 and 2014.

In 2011, the Society's Arts Council funding ended. In 2016, the Poetry Book Society charity which had managed the book club from 1953 had to be wound up. The T. S. Eliot Foundation took over the T. S. Eliot Prize. The PBS's former director, Chris Holifield, was appointed as the prize's new director. The PBS book club and company name were taken over by book sales agency Inpress Ltd in Newcastle.

The British Library acquired the Poetry Book Society archive in 1988 and 1996, consisting of organisational papers, correspondence, financial papers, publicity and photographs.

== Activities ==
The Society's primary activity is selecting newly published poetry books for its members. The titles are selected by a panel of poets and other experts. Originally focussing on English-language collections, the Society now also includes translated poetry. The number of selections has changed over time. Currently, every quarter the panel selects one English-language "PBS Choice", one "Translated Choice", plus four "Recommendations". Full members receive all six books every quarter.

The Society also publishes a quarterly poetry journal, the PBS Bulletin, for its members.

== See also ==
- T. S. Eliot Prize
- New Generation poets (1994)
- Next Generation poets (2004)
- Next Generation poets (2014)
