= London Pride =

London Pride most often refers to:

- Saxifraga × urbium, a flowering garden plant
- London Pride (beer), a bitter brewed by Fuller, Smith and Turner
- Pride in London, London's annual LGBT pride festival and celebration, held during June and July

London Pride may also refer to:

== Plants ==
- Saxifraga × urbium, a flowering garden plant
- Saxifraga cuneifolia, lesser Londonpride
- Crassula multicava, Fairy Crassula

== Other uses ==
- London Pride (film), a 1920 British silent film
- London Pride (novel), a 1941 novel by Phyllis Bottome
- London Pride (1896 novel), a novel by Mary Elizabeth Braddon
- "London Pride" (song), a 1941 song written by Noël Coward during the Blitz of World War II
- London Pride (sculpture), by Frank Dobson, on London's South Bank
- London Pride Sightseeing, a former London tour company owned by Ensignbus operating open-top sightseeing buses in London
- London Pride Morris Men, founded in the 1930s, one of the earliest sides of the Morris Men dance revival, whose membership included Roy Judge
- London Pride, one of several oil tankers built for London & Overseas Freighters in 1950, 1971, and 1993
