= Birdgirl =

Birdgirl may refer to:

- Birdgirl, a nickname of ornithologist Mya-Rose Craig
- Bird Girl, the sculpture on the cover of the book Midnight in the Garden of Good and Evil
- Birdgirl, a character in the Birdman and the Galaxy Trio children's animated series
- Birdgirl (TV series), a spin-off of Harvey Birdman, Attorney at Law, an animated adult sitcom
- Birdgirl, 2022 book by ornithologist Mya-Rose Craig
