= So Many Ways to Begin =

2006 book by Jon McGregor

- First edition
- Author: Jon McGregor
- Language: English
- Genre: novel, experimental novel
- Publisher: Bloomsbury Publishing, London
- Publication date: 2006
- Publication place: United Kingdom
- Media type: Print (Hardcover, Paperback)
- Preceded by: If Nobody Speaks of Remarkable Things (2002)
- Followed by: Even the Dogs (2010)

So Many Ways to Begin is British author Jon McGregor's second novel, first published in 2006. It was longlisted for the 2006 Booker Prize.

== See also ==
- 2006 in literature
- If Nobody Speaks of Remarkable Things
