= Somerset Maugham Award =

Annual British literary award

The Somerset Maugham Award is a British literary prize given each year by the Society of Authors. Set up by William Somerset Maugham in 1947 the awards enable young writers to enrich their work by gaining experience in foreign countries. The awards go to writers under the age of 35 with works published in the year before the award; the work can be either non-fiction, fiction or poetry.

Since 1964 multiple winners have usually been chosen in the same year. In 1975 and in 2012 the award was not given.

== List of winners ==
=== 1940s ===
Somerset Maugham Award winners, 1947–1949
Year	Author	Title	Publisher
1947	A. L. Barker	Innocents	Hogarth Press
1948	P. H. Newby	Journey to the Interior	Jonathan Cape
1949	Hamish Henderson	Elegies for the Dead in Cyrenaica	John Lehmann

=== 1950s ===
Somerset Maugham Award winners, 1950–1959
Year	Author	Title	Publisher	Ref.
1950	Nigel Kneale	Tomato Cain & Other Stories	Collins	
1951	Roland Camberton	Scamp	John Lehmann	
1952	Francis King	The Dividing Stream	Longman	
1953	Emyr Humphreys	Hear and Forgive	Gollancz	
1954	Doris Lessing	Five Short Novels	Michael Joseph	
1955	Kingsley Amis	Lucky Jim	Gollancz	
1956	Elizabeth Jennings	A Way of Looking	Deutsch	
1957	George Lamming	In the Castle of My Skin	Michael Joseph	
1958	John Wain	Preliminary Essays	Macmillan	
1959	Thom Gunn	A Sense of Movement	Faber and Faber	

=== 1960s ===
Somerset Maugham Award winners, 1960–1969
Year	Author	Title	Publisher	Ref.
1960	Ted Hughes	The Hawk in the Rain	Faber and Faber	
1961	V. S. Naipaul	Miguel Street	Deutsch	
1962	Hugh Thomas	The Spanish Civil War	Eyre & Spottiswoode	
1963	David Storey	Flight Into Camden	Longman	
1964	Dan Jacobson	Time of Arrival	Weidenfeld	
1964	John Le Carré	The Spy Who Came in from the Cold	Gollancz	
1965	Peter Everett	Negatives	Jonathan Cape	
1966	Michael Frayn	The Tin Men	Collins	
1966	Julian Mitchell	The White Father	Constable	
1967	B.S. Johnson	Trawl	Secker & Warburg	
1967	Andrew Sinclair	The Better Half	Jonathan Cape	
1968	Paul Bailey	At The Jerusalem	Jonathan Cape	
1968	Seamus Heaney	Death of a Naturalist	Faber and Faber	
1969	Angela Carter	Several Perceptions	Heinemann	

=== 1970s ===
Somerset Maugham Award winners, 1970–1979
Year	Author	Title	Publisher	Ref.
1970	Jane Gaskell	A Sweet Sweet Summer	Hodder & Stoughton	
1970	Piers Paul Read	Monk Dawson	Secker & Warburg	
1971	Richard Barber	The Knight and Chivalry	Longman	
1971	Michael Hastings	Tussy Is Me	Weidenfeld	
1971	Susan Hill	I’m the King of the Castle	Hamish Hamilton	
1972	Douglas Dunn	Terry Street	Faber and Faber	
1972	Gillian Tindall	Fly Away Home	Hodder & Stoughton	
1973	Peter Prince	Play Things	Gollancz	
1973	Paul Strathern	A Season in Abyssinia	Macmillan	
1973	Jonathan Street	Prudence Dictates	Hart-Davis	
1974	Martin Amis	The Rachel Papers	Jonathan Cape	
1975	No Award			
1976	Dominic Cooper	The Dead of Winter	Chatto & Windus	
1976	Ian McEwan	First Love, Last Rites	Jonathan Cape	
1977	Richard Holmes	Shelley: The Pursuit	Quartet Books	
1978	Tom Paulin	A State of Justice	Faber and Faber	
1978	Nigel Williams	My Life Closed Twice	Secker & Warburg	
1979	Helen Hodgman	Jack & Jill	Duckworth	
1979	Sara Maitland	Daughter of Jerusalem	Blond & Briggs	

=== 1980s ===
Somerset Maugham Award winners, 1980–1989
Year	Author	Title	Publisher	Ref.
1980	Humphrey Carpenter	The Inklings	Allen & Unwin	
1980	Max Hastings	Bomber Command	Michael Joseph	
1980	Christopher Reid	Arcadia	Oxford University Press	
1981	Julian Barnes	Metroland	Jonathan Cape	
1981	Clive Sinclair	Hearts of Gold	Allison & Busby	
1981	A. N. Wilson	The Healing Art	Secker & Warburg	
1982	William Boyd	A Good Man in Africa	Hamish Hamilton	
1982	Adam Mars-Jones	Lantern Lecture	Faber and Faber	
1983	Lisa St Aubin de Teran	Keepers of the House	Jonathan Cape	
1984	Peter Ackroyd	The Last Testament of Oscar Wilde	Hamish Hamilton	
1984	Timothy Garton Ash	The Polish Revolution: Solidarity	Jonathan Cape	
1984	Sean O'Brien	The Indoor Park	Bloodaxe Books	
1985	Blake Morrison	Dark Glasses	Chatto & Windus	
1985	Jeremy Reed	By the Fisheries	Jonathan Cape	
1985	Jane Rogers	Her Living Image	Faber and Faber	
1986	Patricia Ferguson	Family Myths and Legends	Andre Deutsch	
1986	Adam Nicolson	Frontiers	Weidenfeld & Nicolson	
1986	Tim Parks	Tongues of Flame	Heinemann	
1987	Stephen Gregory	The Cormorant	Heinemann	
1987	Janni Howker	Isaac Campion	Julia MacRae	
1987	Andrew Motion	The Lamberts	Chatto & Windus	
1988	Jimmy Burns	The Land That Lost Its Heroes	Bloomsbury	
1988	Carol Ann Duffy	Selling Manhattan	Anvil	
1988	Matthew Kneale	Whore Banquets	Gollancz Heinemann	
1989	Rupert Christiansen	Romantic Affinities	Bodley Head	
1989	Alan Hollinghurst	The Swimming-Pool Library	Chatto & Windus	
1989	Deirdre Madden	The Birds of the Innocent Wood	Faber and Faber	

=== 1990s ===
Somerset Maugham Award winners, 1990–1999
Year	Author	Title	Publisher	Ref.
1990	Mark Hudson	Our Grandmothers' Drums	Secker & Warburg	
1990	Sam North	The Automatic Man	Secker & Warburg	
1990	Nicholas Shakespeare	The Vision of Elena Silves	Collins Harvill	
1991	Peter Benson	The Other Occupant	Macmillan	
1991	Lesley Glaister	Honour Thy Father	Secker & Warburg	
1991	Helen Simpson	Four Bare Legs in a Bed	Heinemann	
1992	Geoff Dyer	But Beautiful	Jonathan Cape	
1992	Lawrence Norfolk	Lempriere’s Dictionary	S. Stevenson	
1992	Gerard Woodward	Householder	Chatto & Windus	
1993	Dea Birkett	Jella	Gollancz	
1993	Glyn Maxwell	Out of the Rain	Bloodaxe Books	
1993	Duncan McLean	Bucket of Tongues	Secker & Warburg	
1994	Jackie Kay	Other Lovers	Bloodaxe Books	
1994	A. L. Kennedy	Looking for the Possible Dance	Secker & Warburg	
1994	Philip Marsden	Crossing Place	HarperCollins	
1995	Patrick French	Younghusband	HarperCollins	
1995	Simon Garfield	The End of Innocence	Faber and Faber	
1995	Kathleen Jamie	The Queen of Sheba	Bloodaxe Books	
1995	Laura Thompson	The Dogs	Chatto & Windus	
1996	Katherine Pierpoint	Truffle Beds	Faber and Faber	
1996	Alan Warner	Morvern Callar	Vintage	
1997	Rhidian Brook	The Testimony of Taliesin Jones	Flamingo	
1997	Kate Clanchy	Slattern	Chatto & Windus	
1997	Philip Hensher	Kitchen Venom	Hamish Hamilton	
1997	Francis Spufford	I May Be Some Time	Faber and Faber	
1998	Rachel Cusk	The Country Life	Picador, Macmillan	
1998	Jonathan Rendall	This Bloody Mary is the Last Thing I Own	Faber and Faber	
1998	Kate Summerscale	The Queen of Whale Cay	Fourth Estate	
1998	Robert Twigger	Angry White Pyjamas	Indigo	
1999	Andrea Ashworth	Once In a House On Fire	Picador, Macmillan	
1999	Paul Farley	The Boy from the Chemist Is Here To See You	Picador, Macmillan	
1999	Giles Foden	The Last King of Scotland	Faber and Faber	
1999	Jonathan Freedland	Bring Home the Revolution	Fourth Estate	

=== 2000s ===
Somerset Maugham Award winners, 2000–2009
Year	Author	Title	Publisher	Ref.
2000	Bella Bathurst	The Lighthouse Stevensons	HarperCollins	
2000	Sarah Waters	Affinity	Virago Press	
2001	Edward Platt	Leadville	Picador, Macmillan	
2001	Ben Rice	Pobby and Dingan	Jonathan Cape	
2002	Charlotte Hobson	Black Earth City	Granta	
2002	Marcel Theroux	The Paperchase	Abacus	
2003	William Fiennes	The Snow Geese	Picador, Macmillan	
2003	Hari Kunzru	The Impressionist	Hamish Hamilton	
2003	Jon McGregor	If Nobody Speaks of Remarkable Things	Bloomsbury	
2004	Mark Blayney	Two Kinds of Silence	Manuscript Publishing	
2004	Robert Macfarlane	Mountains of the Mind	Granta	
2004	Charlotte Mendelson	Daughters of Jerusalem	Picador, Macmillan	
2005	Justin Hill	Passing Under Heaven	Abacus	
2005	Maggie O'Farrell	The Distance Between Us	Review	
2006	Chris Cleave	Incendiary	Chatto & Windus	
2006	Owen Sheers	Skirrid Hill	Seren Books	
2006	Zadie Smith	On Beauty	Hamish Hamilton	
2007	Horatio Clare	Running for the Hills	John Murray	
2007	James Scudamore	The Amnesia Clinic	Harvill Secker	
2008	Steven Hall	The Raw Shark Texts	Canongate Books	
2008	Nick Laird	On Purpose	Faber and Faber	
2008	Gwendoline Riley	Joshua Spassky	Cape	
2008	Adam Thirlwell	Miss Herbert (US title: The Delighted States)	Cape	
2009	Alice Albinia	Empires of the Indus: The Story of a River	John Murray	
2009	Adam Foulds	The Broken Word	Cape	
2009	Rodge Glass	Alasdair Gray: A Secretary’s Biography	Bloomsbury	
2009	Henry Hitchings	The Secret Life of Words: How English Became English	John Murray	
2009	Thomas Leveritt	The Exchange Rate Between Love and Money	Harvill Secker	
2009	Helen Walsh	Once Upon a Time in England	Canongate Books	

=== 2010s ===
Somerset Maugham Award winners, 2010–2019
Year	Author	Title	Publisher	Prize	Ref.
2010	Ben Wilson	What Price Liberty?	Faber and Faber	£2,000	
2010	Helen Oyeyemi	White is for Witching	Picador	£3,000	
2010	Jacob Polley	Talk of the Town	Picador	£5,000	
2011	Miriam Gamble	The Squirrels Are Dead	Bloodaxe	£3,500	
2011	Alexandra Harris	Romantic Moderns	Thames and Hudson	£3,500	
2011	Adam O'Riordan	In the Flesh	Chatto Poetry	£3,500	
2012	No award given				
2013	Ned Beauman	The Teleportation Accident	Sceptre	£2,500	
2013	Abi Curtis	The Glass Delusion	Salt	£2,500	
2013	Joe Stretch	The Adult	Cape	£2,500	
2013	Lucy Wood	Diving Belles	Bloomsbury	£2,500	
2014	Amy Sackville	Orkney	Granta	£2,000	
2014	Daisy Hildyard	Hunters in the Snow Glass Delusion	Cape	£4,000	
2014	Nadifa Mohamed	The Orchard of Lost Souls	Simon & Schuster	£4,000	
2015	Jonathan Beckman	How to Ruin a Queen: Marie Antoinette, the Stolen Diamonds and the Scandal that Shook the French Throne	John Murray	£2,500	
2015	Liz Berry	Black Country	Chatto & Windus	£2,500	
2015	Ben Brooks	Lolito	Canongate Books	£2,500	
2015	Zoe Pilger	Eat My Heart Out	Serpent’s Tail	£2,500	
2016	Jessie Greengrass	An Account Of The Decline Of The Great Auk, According To One Who Saw It	JM Originals	£2,500	
2016	Daisy Hay	Mr & Mrs Disraeli: A Strange Romance	Chatto & Windus	£2,500	
2016	Andrew McMillan	Physical	Cape Poetry	£2,500	
2016	Thomas Morris	We Don’t Know What We’re Doing	Faber and Faber	£2,500	
2016	Jack Underwood	Happiness	Faber and Faber	£2,500	
2017	Edmund Gordon	The Invention of Angela Carter	Vintage	£5,000	
2017	Melissa Lee-Houghton	Sunshine	Penned in the Margins	£5,000	
2017	Martin MacInnes	Infinite Ground	Atlantic Books	£5,000	
2018	Kayo Chingonyi	Kumukanda	Chatto Poetry	£5,250	
2018	Fiona Mozley	Elmet	JM Originals	£5,250	
2018	Miriam Nash	All the Prayers in the House	Bloodaxe	£5,250	
2019	Raymond Antrobus	The Perseverance	Penned in the Margins	£4,000	
2019	Damian Le Bas	The Stopping Places	Chatto & Windus	£4,000	
2019	Phoebe Power	Shrines of Upper Austria	Carcanet	£4,000	
2019	Nell Stevens	Mrs Gaskell and Me	Picador	£4,000	

=== 2020s ===
Somerset Maugham Award winners, 2020–present
Year	Author	Title	Publisher	Ref.
2020	Oliver Soden	Michael Tippett: The Biography	Weidenfeld & Nicolson/Orion	
2020	Roseanne Watt	Moder Dy	Birlinn/Polygon	
2020	Alex Allison	The Art of the Body	Dialogue Books/Little, Brown & Co.	
2020	Amrou Al-Kadhi	Unicorn	4th Estate	
2021	Lamorna Ash	Dark, Salt, Clear	Bloomsbury	
2021	Isabelle Baafi	Ripe	Ignition Press	
2021	Akeem Balogun	The Storm	Okapi Books	
2021	Graeme Armstrong	The Young Team	Pan Macmillan/Picador	
2022	Stephanie Sy-Quia	Amnion	Granta, Granta Poetry	
2022	Tice Cin	Keeping the House	And Other Stories	
2022	Lucia Osborne-Crowley	My Body Keeps Your Secrets	Indigo Press	
2022	Caleb Azumah Nelson	Open Water	Penguin Random House/Viking Press	
2022	Maia Elsner	Overrun by Wild Boars	Flipped Eye Publishing	
2023	Travis Alabanza	None of the Above	Canongate	
2023	Sussie Anie	To Fill a Yellow House	Phoenix Books	
2023	Mya-Rose Craig	Birdgirl	Penguin	
2023	Jay Gao	Imperium	Carcanet	
2023	Gurnaik Johal	We Move	Profile	
2023	Moses McKenzie	An Olive Grove in Ends	Wildfire	
2024	Iona Lee	Anamesis		
2024	Momtaza Mehri	Bad Diaspora Poems		
2024	Katherine Pangonis	Twilight Cities		
2024	Cecile Pin	Wandering Souls		
2024	Phoenicia Rogerson	Herc	HarperCollins/HQ Stories	
2025	Jo Hamya	The Hypocrite		
2025	Ashani Lewis	Winter Animals		
2025	Jason Okundaye	Revolutionary Acts: Love & Brotherhood in Black Gay Britain		
2025	Charlotte Shevchenko Night	Food for the Dead		
