= Mr. Fox (disambiguation) =

Mr Fox is a British folk rock group.

Mr. Fox may also refer to:

- Fantastic Mr Fox, a children's novel by Roald Dahl
- Fantastic Mr. Fox (film), an animated film based on the children's novel
- Mr. Fox, a character in the animated series Adventure Time
- Mr. Fox (character), a character in the fairy tale called The Robber Bridegroom
- Mr. Fox (novel), a 2011 novel by Helen Oyeyemi
- Mr. Fox (book), a children's book by Gavin Bishop
- Mr. Fox: A Rumination, a stage show featuring Bill Irwin
- Mr. Fox, a 16th-century English variant of the German fairy tale The Robber Bridegroom
- Fox (surname)

== See also ==
- Mrs Fox
