= Bucket of Tongues =

1992 short story collection by Duncan McLean

- First edition (publisher Secker & Warburg)
- Author: Duncan McLean
- Genre: Short story collection
- Publisher: Secker & Warburg
- Publication date: January 1, 1992

Bucket of Tongues is a collection of twenty-three short stories by the Scottish writer Duncan McLean. Published in 1992, it was McLean's first book. McLean won the Somerset Maugham Award in 1993 for the collection.

== Stories ==
1."When God comes and gathers his jewels"
2."Cold kebab breakfast"
3."A/deen soccer thugs kill all visiting fans"
4."The big man that dropped dead"
5."The doubles"
6."After Guthrie's"
7."New Year"
8."Headnip".
9."Doubled up with pain"
10."Bod is dead"
11."Bed of thistles"
12."Quality control"
13."Hours of darkness"
14."Three nasty stories"
15."Thistle story"
16."Lurch"
17."Dying and being alive"
18."Loaves and fishes, nah"
19."The druids shite it, fail to show"
20."Shoebox"
21."Jesus fuckeroo"
22."Tongue"
23."Lucky to be alive"

== Themes ==
Erich Hertz wrote in the Scottish Literary Review that Bucket of Tongues opens with an incident where a home has been broken into or is "perceived as in some way violated". Hertz argues that the break-in, or the imminent commination, and the "onslaught on domestic safety perpetrated by it, can be seen as symptomatic of a larger, all-embracing anxiety at a national level". He says there is a metaphor at play here, in that the "lack of security at the domicile portrays a similar concern about the lack of stability in the homeland [Scotland]".

== Reviews ==
Publishers Weekly wrote that the "characters in these 23 short stories shiver through the night and squabble the day away" ... and that McLean's characters "wade through dire straits with the wide ironic grins of those whose facade of cockiness might at any moment crack". Overall, they opine that McClean's writing is "clean sober prose with sharp accurate descriptions of the natural world". Diana Casey of the Guide to Literary Masters & Their Works says this collection of short stories is "particularly intense and raw" ... and that McLean "brings to light the harsh life of Scotland’s unemployed and down-and-out ... the characters live a day-to-day existence, hidden behind objectionable assertiveness, and they often must turn to thievery to survive". Walker Gaffney wrote in The New York Times that McClean uses a "keen objective eye with an ear for the slang of Aberdeenshire pubs to evoke a world view both funny and bleak".

In their review, Kirkus Reviews wrote that it is a "powerful first book by a furiously talented writer ... and that he pumps underclass rage and considerable sensitivity through his fairly interchangeable Edinburgh characters". They opine that McLean's stories "imply a quickened, redemptive understanding of human behavior through dialogue that feels unspeakably sad ... with raw and realistic blasts of street-level life". They also note that some stories are only a paragraph long, while other stories are 30 pages long. Canadian book critic Neil Scotten wrote in the Edmonton Journal, that the collection includes "well-crafted stories" like The Doubles and Quality Control, and highlighted two short stories in particular, The Big Man That Dropped Dead and Thistle Story, as "just ripping away and spitting in the eye of convention", and only being a paragraph long are "intriguing wisps that seem to locate something epiphanic in the dreariest snatch of loose conversation heard through a half-open door". He also points out that for some readers, "the language could be a problem ... body parts and functions are never far away", but in his opinion "the slang is not pitched to gratuitously shock".
