= Sussie Anie =

British-Ghanaian writer (born 1994)

Sussie Ohenewaa Anie (born 1994) is a British-Ghanaian writer. Her debut novel To Fill a Yellow House appeared in 2022, and was praised by the critics. Anie won the Somerset Maugham Award for this novel, which was also nominated for the Authors' Club Best First Novel Award.

== Early life ==
Anie is from North London and attended East Barnet School. She graduated from the University of Warwick. She then studied creative writing at the University of East Anglia.
