= Sam North =

English author (born 1960)

- Born: 30 August 1960 (age 65); Bury St Edmunds, Suffolk, United Kingdom
- Occupations: Novelist, screenwriter, lecturer
- Awards: Somerset Maugham Prize

Sam North (born 30 August 1960) is a British novelist, screenwriter, and lecturer in creative writing at the University of Exeter.

== Early life ==
North was born in Bury St Edmunds, Suffolk, United Kingdom. He left school at 16 and worked as a groom, a motorcycle messenger, a runner on film sets, and on building sites.

== Career ==
North's first novel, The Automatic Man, won the Somerset Maugham Prize. His 2004 novel, The Unnumbered, was longlisted for the Booker Prize. North has written two books about writing, Five Analogies for Fiction Writing and The Instinctive Screenplay. He works as a lecturer in creative writing at the University of Exeter.

== Works ==
- The Automatic Man (1989)
- Chapel Street (1991)
- The Gifting Programme (1992)
- By Desire (1996)
- The Lie of the Land (1998)
- The Unnumbered (2004)
- The Velvet Rooms (2006)
- The Old Country (2007)
- Doc Martin Series:
  - Practice Makes Perfect (2013)
  - Mistletoe and Whine (2013)
- Five Analogies for Fiction Writing (2014)
- Endtime Chronicles (with Sam Hawksmoor)
  - Another Place to Die (2014)
- The Instinctive Screenplay (2017)
- A Cure for Sceptics (2021)
