= Gingerbread (Oyeyemi novel) =

2019 novel by Helen Oyeyemi

- First edition (US)
- Author: Helen Oyeyemi
- Language: English
- Publisher: Picador (UK); Riverhead Books (US)
- Publication place: United Kingdom

Gingerbread is a 2019 novel by Helen Oyeyemi.

== Writing and composition ==
Oyeyemi lives in Prague, and the local tradition of producing gingerbread, known as perník, inspired its inclusion in the book.

== Reception ==
Eowyn Ivey, in a review for the New York Times Book Review, praised the book as "jarring, funny, surprising, unsettling, disorienting and rewarding."
