= White Is for Witching =

2009 novel by Helen Oyeyemi

- First edition
- Author: Helen Oyeyemi
- Language: English
- Genre: Contemporary fantasy
- Publisher: Hamish Hamilton
- Publication date: 2009

White Is for Witching (published in Britain as Pie-kah) is a 2009 novel by British author Helen Oyeyemi. The novel, Oyeyemi's third, won a 2010 Somerset Maugham Award. Combining elements of ghost, vampire, and haunted house stories, White Is for Witching concerns a twin named Miranda and her relationship with the sentient, xenophobic house she inhabits. A French translation was published as Le Blanc va aux sorcières in 2011.

== Plot ==
=== Prologue ===
The novel begins with several cryptic pages in which questions are asked of three entities: a woman named Ore, a man named Eliot, and the Silver House at 29 Barton Road. Each answers the question, "Where is Miranda Silver?" Ore answers that Miranda is in the ground below the Silver House, her throat blocked by a chunk of apple. Eliot answers that Miranda has been missing for six months. The Silver House answers that Miranda is at home, "homesick, home sick."

=== Part One: Curioser ===
Twins Miranda and Eliot Silver and their parents, Lily Silver and Luc Dufresne, run a bed-and-breakfast in Lily's childhood home, 29 Barton Road in Dover. When the twins are sixteen and a half, Lily Silver is killed while on assignment as a photojournalist in Haiti. Miranda, who has a pre-existing pica eating disorder, descends into depression and ultimately suffers a mental break that results in a five-month clinic stay.

The Silver House shows malevolent, xenophobic tendencies connected to the maternal line of the Silver women (Lily, Lily's mother Jennifer, and Jennifer's mother Anna). It attacks guests, and the Azeri housekeeper, her husband, and their two daughters move out after the house traps their eldest daughter in the elevator.

Meanwhile Miranda continues to lose weight due to her eating disorder and begins to show characteristics (appearances, behaviours, idiolects) of the deceased women from her maternal line, to the extent that her own twin mistakes her for their mother. When her father asks Miranda her birth year, Miranda can't remember. The Silver House reveals that Anna Good (Miranda's great-grandmother) was the one to bring it to life with a curse after her husband died in Africa in WWII, fighting the Germans.

Luc hires a new housekeeper, a Yoruba woman named Sade who practices Juju witchcraft and makes protective objects after arriving, presumably to protect herself from the House's hostility. While the other members of the household are out, the house attacks Sade by possessing a mannequin.

The House states that Jennifer Silver (Lily's mother) didn't run away as the family believed; because Jennifer was planning to abandon Lily, the House trapped her inside its walls where she lived out the rest of her life. The House adds, "Believe it, don't believe it, as you will" and proposes that instead Anna caught Jennifer running away and strangled her to death.

=== Part Two: And Curioser ===
Miranda heads to Cambridge alone, where she begins a romantic relationship with a girl named Ore, who is of Nigerian descent. The narration moves to Ore's perspective and explores her experience in Cambridge's white-dominated society. Ore often references the Caribbean folk story of the soucouyant, who is an old woman that abandons her skin at night to feed on the souls of others. In the story, the soucouyant is defeated when a girl rubs its abandoned skin with salt and pepper, preventing the soucouyant from re-entering.

Ore sees a photo of long-haired Miranda pre-breakdown but can't believe it's her, because Miranda has now almost completely taken on the appearances of Lily, Jennifer, and Anna. Shortly before the Christmas break, Miranda tries to jump out of Ore's fourth-floor window, saying that the Silver House is calling her, but Ore manages to pull her back.

When Miranda returns home, now so weak she has difficulty walking and seeing, she invites Ore to stay with her. Ore accepts, though she's been warned about Dover's reputation for xenophobia. The Silver House and its ghosts are enraged that Miranda has fallen in love with a black woman, and turn their violent tendencies against her and Ore.

When Ore arrives, the house attacks her repeatedly. Sade tells her that the house is a monster and gives her salt and chilli peppers for protection. After the house attacks Ore again in the night, she decides to leave.

As she tries to leave, Ore has a series of hallucinatory encounters with the House: She encounters a little girl in the elevator, holding something bloody and covered in flies. She rubs her hands in salt and tears at this girl's face, revealing Miranda, who attacks her. Ore manages to hold her by the throat until the elevator stops at a new floor, filled with silent white figures, which Ore blinds with salt. She splits Miranda's skin open "like a bad nut" and it falls off, revealing the long-haired girl from the photo—Miranda before her breakdown. This Miranda desperately tries to climb back into the skin, while Ore manages to escape the house (with help from Sade) and goes home.

After Ore leaves, Miranda steels herself to fight the Silver House and its ghosts, deciding that she can't be "herself plus all her mothers." On her return, someone has heaped all-season apples in the kitchen. Miranda swallows two watch batteries (the ingestion of which can cause death). Eliot has made her a pie from the all-season apples (which the Silver House produces), but Miranda refuses to eat it, thinking he is trying to poison her. She runs downstairs barefoot, which is the last anyone sees of her.

The novel ends where it began. Miranda has been missing for six months, since the apple pie incident. The bed-and-breakfast has been closed, but Eliot sometimes notices that furniture has been moved. Miranda's old shoes continually fill with a thick red liquid that smells like roses. Eliot thinks he hears Miranda's footsteps in the attic of the Silver House.

== Characters ==
- Miranda Silver (Miri): Miranda, the novel's protagonist, is a young woman with a hereditary pica eating disorder, who uncontrollably consumes chalk. Throughout the novel she takes on more and more characteristics of the maternal Silver line.
- Eliot Silver: Eliot is Miranda's twin brother. He is one of the first-person narrators.
- 29 Barton Road (The Silver House): The Silver House in Dover, currently a bed-and-breakfast, is another of the first-person narrators. The Silver House is possessed by Miranda's deceased maternal ancestors, Lily, Jennifer, and Anna. It shows xenophobic and racist tendencies, often attacking the immigrants and people of color who stay or live there.
- Ore Lind: Ore is Miranda's love interest and one of the few characters that sees the house for what it is. She is the final first-person narrator. She is the daughter of a Nigerian immigrant and was adopted as a baby by white British parents.
- Luc Dufresne: Luc Dufresne is the father of Miranda and Eliot. Luc runs the Silver House as a bed-and-breakfast. Luc is a good cook and is constantly trying to concoct dishes that will be appetizing to Miranda.
- Lily Silver: Lily Silver is a photojournalist, and Miranda and Eliot's mother. She is shot and killed in Haiti while on assignment at the beginning of the novel.
- Jennifer Silver: Lily's mother. She ostensibly ran off after having Lily, leaving her own mother Anna to raise Lily, but the House claims to have trapped her inside its walls, where Jennifer lived a long but "unconventional" life until 1993—though the House also raises the possibility that Anna strangled Jennifer to death when she caught Jennifer running away.
- Anna Silver (née Anna Good): Also referred to as GrandAnna. Anna raised Lily after Jennifer Silver's disappearance. The House credits her with bringing it to life through a curse, and she seems to be the source of its violent xenophobic tendencies.
- Sade: Sade is the housekeeper of the Silver House, a Yoruba woman versed in juju. She has tribal scars on her cheeks. Sade is the only character to battle successfully with the Silver House.

== Narration ==
Point of view within the novel is complex and unconventional, with one of the first-person narrators being the Silver House itself. The perspective shifts between first-person and third-person sections; first-person sections are narrated by Eliot, Ore, and the Silver House, while the third-person sections are limited to Miranda's perspective. All of the first-person narrators are unreliable, and the third-person narrator cleaves so closely to Miranda's perspective as to reflect her biases and hallucinations.

== Reception ==
White Is for Witching received mixed reviews but won a 2010 Somerset Maugham Award. Andrew Ervin's The New York Times review compared the novel to Toni Morrison's Beloved and Chris Abani's Song for the Night and called it "a delightfully unconventional coming-of-age story" but added that the story "is suffering ever so slightly under the weight of a political agenda." The Guardian was critical, calling it "a ghost story without much of a ghost, or a story." Writing in Callaloo, Aspasia Stephanou praised White Is for Witching for subverting "the conventional and metaphorical associations of vampirism with the “foreign” other, as the British Nigerian Ore draws upon her knowledge of the soucouyant in order to try to understand and explain the dangerous matriarchal line of Miranda Silver’s British ancestors. White is established as the marker of evil, a whiteness that embodies British nationalism."
