= Laura Thompson (British author) =

English writer

Laura Thompson is an English writer and biographer. Her first book The Dogs: A Personal History of Greyhound Racing won the Somerset Maugham Award. She has also written acclaimed biographies of Nancy Mitford and Agatha Christie, and true-crime books on the disappearance of Lord Lucan and on the 1920s cause celebres Edith Thompson and Frederick Bywaters.

== Early life ==
As a teenager, Thompson intended to go into theatre and attended Tring Park School for the Performing Arts, where she trained in dance. She went on to study English at Merton College, Oxford.

== Bibliography ==
=== Books ===
- The Dogs: A personal history of greyhound racing (1994)
- Life in a Cold Climate: Nancy Mitford the Biography (2003)
- Agatha Christie: An English Mystery (2007) (re-published in 2018 as Agatha Christie: A Mysterious Life)
- The Six: The lives of the Mitford sisters (2016) (alternate title Take Six Girls)
- Rex v Edith: A Tale of Two Murders (2018) (alternate title A Tale of Two Murders: Guilt, Innocence, and the Execution of Edith Thompson)
- A Different Class of Murder: The Story of Lord Lucan (2018)
- The Last Landlady: An English Memoir (2019)
- Heiresses: The lives of the million dollar babies (2022)

=== Edited volumes ===
- Au Revoir Now Darlint: The Letters of Edith Thompson (2023)
