= Jonathan Beckman =

British journalist and historian

Jonathan Beckman is a British journalist and historian. He was educated at Cambridge University and the University of London. He is best known for his book How to Ruin a Queen: Marie Antoinette and the Diamond Necklace Affair, which received widespread critical acclaim. It won Beckman the Somerset Maugham Award and the Royal Society of Literature Jerwood Award for Non-Fiction.

He has worked at the Literary Review and the Economist magazine.
