= Charlotte Hobson =

English writer

- Born: Charlotte Adelaide Hobson; 1970 (age 55–56)
- Education: University of Edinburgh
- Spouse: Philip Marsden
- Children: 2
- Writing career
- Years active: 2002-present

Charlotte Adelaide Hobson (born 1970) is an English writer. Her memoir Black Earth City (2002), which recounts living in Russia in the early 1990s, won the Somerset Maugham Award.

== Biography ==
Hobson grew up in Southampton. Her father was Anthony Hobson. She is of Russian heritage through her mother Tatyana (née Vinogradoff) and took local Russian lessons growing up. Following her mother's death from cancer, Hobson continued her Russian studies at Edinburgh University. As part of her degree program, she spent a year abroad in the Russian city of Voronezh in 1991–1992. In 1993, Hobson was admitted to a&e after breaking her arm during a session of heavy drinking in Edinburgh.

Her experiences of living in Russia in the earliest phase of its post-Soviet transition became the subject of her travel memoir Black Earth City. The book won the Somerset Maugham Award, and was also nominated for the Duff Cooper Prize and the Thomas Cook Travel Book Award. It was reviewed by the NYT, The Guardian and the FT among others. The book was reissued in 2017 by Faber and Faber with a foreword by Peter Pomerantsev. Hobson's second book, a novel called The Vanishing Futurist, appeared in 2016. Her novel was turned into an audiobook for the BBC Radio 4 series Book at Bedtime, read by Barbara Flynn.

She is married to the writer Philip Marsden.

== Bibliography ==
=== Books ===
- Hobson, Charlotte (2001). Black Earth City: When Russia Ran Wild (and So Did We). Picador. ISBN 9780312420611.
  - Hobson, Charlotte (2002). Black Earth City: When Russia Ran Wild (and So Did We). Metropolitan Books. ISBN 978-0805069327.
  - Hobson, Charlotte (2002). Black Earth City: A Year in the Heart of Russia. Granta Books. ISBN 978-1862074989.
  - Hobson, Charlotte (2017). Black Earth City: A Year in the Heart of Russia. Faber & Faber. ISBN 978-0571340781.
- Hobson, Charlotte (2016). The Vanishing Futurist. Faber & Faber. ISBN 9780571234868.

=== Essays and shorts ===
- Hobson, Charlotte (22 December 1998). "Peter Truth". Granta. No. 64.
- Hobson, Charlotte (2016). "Foreward". Moscow Stations: A Poem. By Yerofeev, Venedikt. Translated by Mulrine, Stephen. UK: Faber & Faber. pp. vii–xii. ISBN 978-0-571-32278-7.
