= Miriam Nash =

Scottish poet, performer and arts facilitator

- Born: 1985 (age 40–41)
- Education: Sarah Lawrence College
- Occupations: Poet, performer, arts facilitator
- Writing career
- Notable work: All the Prayers in the House
- Notable awards: Eric Gregory Award (2015); Somerset Maugham Award (2018)
- Website: Official website

Miriam Nash is a Scottish poet, performer and arts facilitator. She has published a pamphlet, Small Change (2015) and a full-length poetry collection, All the Prayers in the House (2017). She received an Eric Gregory Award in 2015, was shortlisted for the Edwin Morgan Poetry Award in 2016, and won the Somerset Maugham Award in 2018.

== Biography ==
Miriam Nash was born in Inverness, Scotland, in 1985. Including spending her early years on the island of Erraid, she grew up in Scotland, and England and Wales. In Scotland, she was raised by her mother and sisters in the Findhorn commune. Nash won a Fulbright Scholarship to study poetry at Sarah Lawrence College in New York, where she obtained an MFA in 2014. The same year, a one-woman show, 'Lightkeepers', was performed by Nash at the college. This short play was produced by Downstage.

Nash's pamphlet Small Change was published by Flipped eye publishing in 2013. In 2016, she was Writer-in-residence at Greenway, the holiday home of Agatha Christie. In 2017, her first full-length collection, All the Prayers in the House, was published by Bloodaxe Books. One of the themes of the collection consists of lighthouses and Robert Louis Stevenson, whose family once worked as lighthouse engineers at Erraid, west of Mull. With artwork by her mother, the artist Christina Edlund-Plater, Nash published another limited-edition pamphlet, The Nine Mothers of Heimdallr, with Hercules Editions in 2020. Poets Kayo Chingonyi and Jacqueline Saphra called the collection "breathtaking" and "starkly relevant to our times." As a poet and arts facilitator, Nash has worked with schools, museums, mental health organisations and prisons in the UK, USA and Singapore.

Nash currently lives with her husband, a CNN reporter, in Peckham, London, and teaches creative writing at the Ministry of Stories.

== Awards ==
Nash received an Eric Gregory Award in 2015 and was nominated for the Edwin Morgan Poetry Award in 2016, for her pamphlet Small Change. She was winner of the Somerset Maugham Award in 2018 for a "hypnotic sense of place" in her poetry collection, All the Prayers in the House, and was shortlisted for the Seamus Heaney Centre for Poetry Prize for First Full Collection 2018.

== Poetry collections ==
- Small Change (2013)
- All the Prayers in the House (2017)
- The Nine Mothers of Heimdallr (2020)
