= Bella Bathurst =

English writer and photographer

Bella Bathurst (born 1969) is an English writer, photojournalist, and furniture maker. Her book The Lighthouse Stevensons won the 2000 Somerset Maugham Award.

== Biography ==
Bathurst was born in London and presently lives in Scotland. She lost "her hearing in her twenties ... unexpectedly regaining it twelve years later," which she explored in her 2017 book Sound.

Aside from writing, Bathurst has worked as a freelance journalist, photographer, and illustrator. Her writing has appeared in such publications as The Guardian, The Independent, The Daily Telegraph, The Observer, The Scotsman, Scotland on Sunday, The Sunday Times, and The Washington Post.

== Awards ==
The Lighthouse Stevensons won the 2000 Somerset Maugham Award and was nominated for the 1999 Guardian First Book Award. List Magazine named it one of the "100 best Scottish books of all time." Booklist and Publishers Weekly gave the book starred reviews.

Special was longlisted for the Orange Prize and was generally well-received among British press.

Sound received starred reviews from Shelf Awareness.

== Publications ==
- The Lighthouse Stevensons (1999)
- Special (2002)
- The Wreckers: A Story of Killing Seas and Plundered Shipwrecks, from the 18th-Century to the Present Day (2005)
- The Bicycle Book (2011)
- The Omega Point: The search for the secret of human consciousness (2015)
- Sound: A Story of Hearing Lost and Found (2017)
- Field Work: What Land Does to People What People Do to Land (2021)
