= Jonathan Rendall =

British writer (1964–2013)

Jonathan Rendall

Jonathan Rendall (11 June 1964 – c. 23 January 2013) was a British writer. He won the Somerset Maugham Award.

== Life ==
Rendall was born in Oxford and adopted as a baby. He lived his childhood in Ashtead, Surrey and much of his teenage years in Greece. He attended St John's School, Leatherhead, and Magdalen College, Oxford. He later lived in Ipswich, Suffolk.

Before becoming a writer, he acted as managerial advisor to the World Featherweight boxing champion, Colin "Sweet C" McMillan. He wrote articles for the magazines Esquire, Ring and Playboy, as well as writing three multi-award-winning books.

Rendall starred in a three-part documentary entitled 'The Gambler', released by Channel 4. In it, he was given £12,000 of the broadcaster's money, chronicling the bets he placed on boxing, horse racing, slot-machines, and at the casino.

Rendall married Susie in 1988. The couple had three children together and separated in 2000.

On 23 January 2013, Rendall was discovered dead at his home in Ipswich.

== Books by Rendall ==
- This Bloody Mary (Is the Last Thing I Own)
- Twelve Grand: The Gambler as Hero
- Garden Hopping: Memoir of an Adoption
- Scream: The Tyson Tapes
