= Pol Heyvaert =

Belgian theatre director

Pol Heyvaert is a Belgian stage director and designer with long-standing ties to the Ghent-based theatre company Victoria.

Pol Heyvaert has a long-standing relationship with Victoria. He was the stage designer for several of their productions including: Moeder en Kind ([[Alain Platel]] & Arne Sierens; 1994); Bernadetje (Alain Platel & Arne Sierens; 1997); Dansé Donsé Dan Dan (Latrinité; 1995), Auri Sacra Fames (Latrinité; 1997); Limbus Patrum (Latrinité; 2000), Wayn Storm Carmen Story and Mise-en-Traub V (Wayn Traub;2001); Snack Bar Tragedy (Christophe Frick; 2002) and White Star (Lies Pauwels; 2004).

Pol Heyvaert also founded the Kung Fu collective together with Felix van Groeningen, where he directed Best of and Discothèque. He has also worked as stage designer for les ballets C de la B, notably for Alain Platel's iets Op Bach (1998), and for Nieuwpoorttheater with De 10des (1994), Napels (1996), Radio Carmen (1996) and Flippers (1996). In 2001, he collaborated with Felix van Groeningen again on the Kung Fu short film Bonjour Maman and as a production designer for the feature film Steve + Sky.

He directed Aalst (play) Conceived, directed and designed texts by Pol Heyvaert and Dimitri Verhulst English translation by Duncan McLean National Theatre of Scotland production Original version Victoria 2005 Scottish version 2007, production at the Sydney Festival 2008
