= Jon McGregor =

British novelist and short story writer (born 1976)

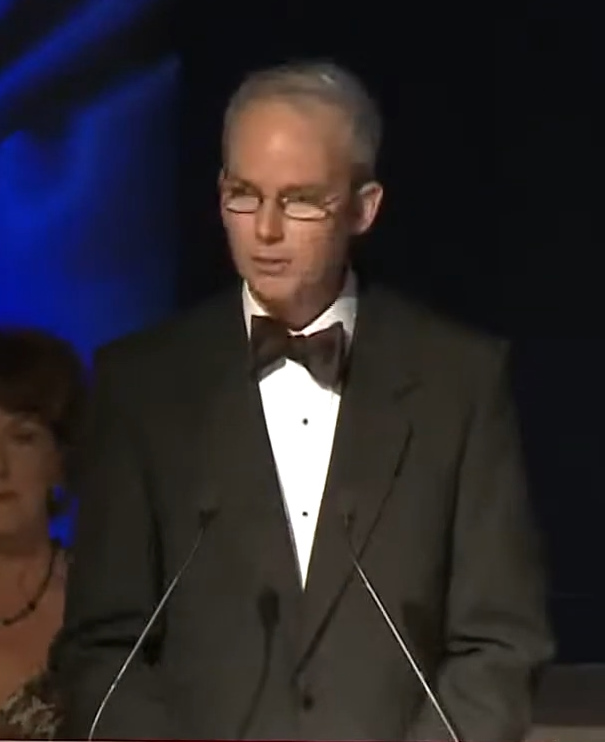
- McGregor in 2012
- Born: Jon McGregor; 1976 (age 49–50); Bermuda
- Occupation: Writer
- Writing career
- Period: 2002–present
- Genres: Novel; short story
- Notable works: If Nobody Speaks of Remarkable Things; Even the Dogs; Reservoir 13
- Notable awards: Somerset Maugham Award; 2003; Betty Trask Prize; 2003; International Dublin Literary Award; 2012; Costa Book Awards; 2017

Jon McGregor (born 1976) is a British novelist and short story writer. In 2002, his first novel was longlisted for the Booker Prize, making him then the youngest-ever contender. His second and fourth novels were longlisted for the Booker Prize in 2006 and 2017 respectively. In 2012, his third novel, Even the Dogs, was awarded the International Dublin Literary Award. The New York Times has labelled him a "wicked British writer".

== Early life ==
Born in Bermuda, McGregor was raised in the UK. He grew up in Norwich and Thetford, Norfolk. He attended City College Norwich sixth form and then studied for a degree in Media Technology and Production at Bradford University. In his final year there he contributed a series entitled "Cinema 100" to the anthology Five Uneasy Pieces (Pulp Faction).

== Career ==
Having moved to Nottingham (where he now lives), he wrote his first novel, If Nobody Speaks of Remarkable Things, while living on a narrowboat. It was nominated for the 2002 Booker Prize, making its author the youngest contender and only first novelist on the longlist. McGregor was only 26 at the time.

If Nobody Speaks of Remarkable Things went on to win the Betty Trask Prize and the Somerset Maugham Award, among other honours. His novel So Many Ways to Begin, published in 2006, also found its way onto the Booker Prize longlist. McGregor was commissioned to write a short story, which was called "Close", for the Cheltenham Literature Festival in 2007. McGregor has had short fiction published by several magazines, including Granta magazine. His first collection of short stories is entitled This Isn't the Sort of Thing That Happens to Someone Like You (2012). His influences include Alice Munro, Douglas Coupland, Raymond Carver, Richard Brautigan and Charles Simic.

In 2010, McGregor received an honorary doctorate from the University of Nottingham, and was made an honorary lecturer in their School of English Studies. He is currently a writer-in-residence for the charity First Story. On 13 June 2012, McGregor was awarded the International Dublin Literary Award for his third novel Even the Dogs, with Lord Mayor Andrew Montague announcing the winner at the Mansion House, Dublin. The book was nominated for the award by Rudomino State Library for Foreign Literature in Moscow.

The International Dublin Literary Award was a competition among 147 writers nominated by international public libraries, including Pulitzer Prize winner Jennifer Egan. McGregor received a prize of €100,000. The prize's judging panel, which included the British novelist Tim Parks and the Trinidadian writer Elizabeth Nunez, described Even the Dogs, a novel detailing the highs and lows of drug addiction, as a "fearless experiment". McGregor described it as "a real honour to have been selected from such a huge list of fantastic works from around the world." He was the first British writer to win the award since Nicola Barker in 2000.

== Works ==
=== Novels ===
- If Nobody Speaks of Remarkable Things (Bloomsbury, 2002)
- So Many Ways to Begin (Bloomsbury, 2006)
- Even the Dogs (Bloomsbury, 2010)
- Reservoir 13 (HarperCollins, 2017)
- Lean Fall Stand (HarperCollins, 2021)

=== Short story collections ===
- This Isn't the Sort of Thing That Happens to Someone Like You (Bloomsbury, 2012)
- The Reservoir Tapes (2017)

== Awards ==
=== Honors ===
- 2010: Honorary Doctorate, University of Nottingham

=== Awards ===
Year	Title	Award	Category	Result	Ref.
2002	If Nobody Speaks of Remarkable Things	Commonwealth Writers Prize	Eurasia Region, First Book	Shortlisted	
2002	If Nobody Speaks of Remarkable Things	Booker Prize	—	Longlisted	
2003	If Nobody Speaks of Remarkable Things	Betty Trask Prize and Awards	Betty Trask Prize	Won	
2003	If Nobody Speaks of Remarkable Things	Somerset Maugham Award	—	Won	
2003	If Nobody Speaks of Remarkable Things	Waverton Good Read Award	—	Shortlisted	
2006	So Many Ways to Begin	Booker Prize	—	Longlisted	
2010	"If it Keeps on Raining"	BBC National Short Story Award	—	Runner-up	
2011	"Wires"	BBC National Short Story Award	—	Runner-up	
2012	Even the Dogs	International Dublin Literary Award	—	Won	
2012	This Isn't the Sort of Thing...	Frank O'Connor International Short Story Award	—	Longlisted	
2017	Reservoir 13	Booker Prize	—	Longlisted	
2017	Reservoir 13	Costa Book Awards	Novel	Won	
2017	Reservoir 13	Goldsmiths Prize	—	Shortlisted	
2018	Reservoir 13	British Book Awards	Fiction Book of the Year	Won	
2018	Reservoir 13	The Writers' Prize	—	Shortlisted	
2019	Reservoir 13	International Dublin Literary Award	—	Shortlisted	
