= Helen Oyeyemi =

British novelist and playwright

Helen Oyeyemi FRSL
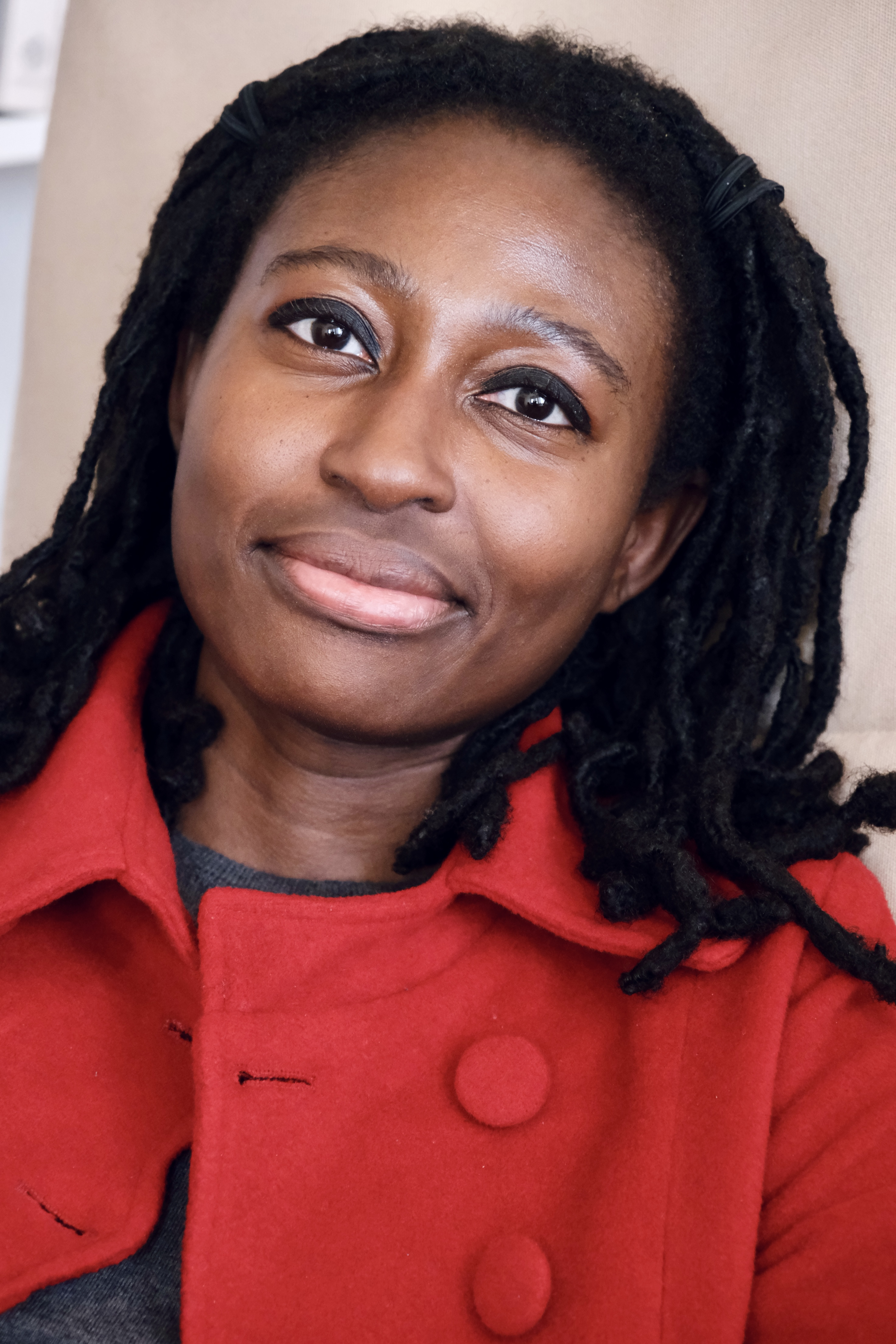
- Helen Oyeyemi in January 2021
- Born: Helen Oyeyemi; 10 December 1984 (age 41); Ibadan, Nigeria
- Occupation: Writer
- Writing career
- Genres: Novel, short story, play
- Notable work: What Is Not Yours Is Not Yours (2016)
- Notable awards: PEN Open Book Award

Helen Oyeyemi FRSL (born 10 December 1984) is a British novelist and writer of short stories.

== Early life and education ==
Oyeyemi was born in Nigeria and was raised in Lewisham, South London from when she was four. Oyeyemi wrote her first novel, The Icarus Girl, while studying for her A-levels at Cardinal Vaughan Memorial School. She attended Corpus Christi College, Cambridge.

== Career ==
While she was in college, Oyeyemi's plays Juniper's Whitening and Victimese were performed by fellow students and later published by Methuen in 2014. In 2007, Bloomsbury published Oyeyemi's second novel, The Opposite House, which is inspired by Cuban mythology. Her third novel, White Is for Witching, was published by Picador in May 2009. It was a 2009 Shirley Jackson Award finalist and won a 2010 Somerset Maugham Award. In 2009, Oyeyemi was recognized as one of the women on Venus Zine's "25 under 25" list.

Her fourth novel, Mr Fox, was published by Picador in June 2011. She was elected a Fellow of the Royal Society of Literature in 2012 and in 2013 she was included in the Granta Best of Young British Novelists list. Her fifth novel, Boy, Snow, Bird, was published by Picador in 2014. Boy, Snow, Bird was a finalist for the Los Angeles Times Book Prize in 2014.

Oyeyemi published What Is Not Yours Is Not Yours, a story collection, in 2016. What Is Not Yours Is Not Yours won the 2016 PEN Open Book Award: for an exceptional book-length work of literature by an author of colour. Gingerbread, a novel, was published on 5 March 2019. Peaces, a novel, was published on 1 April 2021.

Her eighth novel, Parasol Against the Axe, was published in February 2024. It is the first of her books to be set in the Czech Republic, despite living there for more than a decade. Her ninth novel A New New Me was also set in the country.

=== Judging roles ===
Oyeyemi was a judge on the Booktrust Independent Foreign Fiction Prize for 2015

Oyeyemi served as a judge for the 2015 Scotiabank Giller Prize.

Oyeyemi was a judge for the 2018 International Booker Prize.

Oyeyemi was a judge for the 2023 Goldsmiths Prize, along with Tom Lee (chair), Maddie Mortimer and Ellen Peirson-Hagger.

== Personal life ==
Since 2013 her home has been in Prague.

== Bibliography ==
=== Novels ===
- The Icarus Girl (2005)
- The Opposite House (2007)
- White Is for Witching (2009)
- Mr. Fox (2011)
- Boy, Snow, Bird (2014)
- Gingerbread (2019)
- Peaces (2021)
- Parasol Against the Axe (2024)
- A New New Me (2025)

=== Plays ===
- Juniper's Whitening (2004)
- Victimese (2005)

=== Short story collections ===
- What Is Not Yours Is Not Yours (2016)
