= Jonathan Street =

British novelist (1943–2012)

Jonathan Street (9 February 1943 – 1 November 2012) was a British novelist. He won the Somerset Maugham Award for his novel Prudence Dictates (1972). Among his other books are Yours (1970) and Rebarbative! (1969).

Street was also a respected public relations executive specializing in the field of healthcare.

Street died in 2012 after a fall.
