= The Confessions of Mycroft Holmes: A Paper Chase =

2001 novel by Marcel Theroux

- First edition (US)
- Author: Marcel Theroux
- Language: English
- Genre: Mystery novel
- Publisher: Harcourt
- Publication date: 2001
- Publication place: United Kingdom
- Media type: Print (Hardback & Paperback)
- Pages: 216 pp
- ISBN: 0-15-100647-4
- OCLC: 45207870
- Dewey Decimal: 813/.54 21
- LC Class: PS3570.H395 C66 2001

The Confessions of Mycroft Holmes: A Paper Chase is the title of a 2001 novel by Marcel Theroux. It was published in the United Kingdom in 2002 as The Paperchase.

The protagonist is an Anglo-American journalist, Damien March, who inherits a dilapidated mansion in the United States on the death of his uncle, Patrick. Upon taking up residence, he discovers several short stories featuring Mycroft Holmes, which lead him to investigate the relationship between his father, mother and uncle.

The novel was named the winner of the Somerset Maugham Award in 2002.
