= Lamorna Ash =

British writer

- Born: Lamorna Juliet Ash; 27 November 1994 (age 31)
- Education: Oxford University; University College London
- Occupation: Writer
- Writing career
- Notable works: Dark, Salt, Clear: Life in a Cornish Fishing Town
- Notable awards: The Somerset Maugham Award (2021)

Lamorna Juliet Ash (born 27 November 1994) is a British writer. Her first book, Dark, Salt, Clear: Life in a Cornish Fishing Town, won the Somerset Maugham Award in 2021. Her second book, Don't Forget We're Here Forever: A New Generation's Search for Religion was released in May 2025.

== Biography ==
Ash is from West London; her mother is Cornish. Ash attended St Paul's Girls' School before studying English literature at Oxford University, graduating in 2016. She earned an MA in Social and Cultural Anthropology from University College London. She worked as an intern at The Times Literary Supplement.

Ash chose to study the fishing community in Newlyn, a fishing town in Cornwall, for her master's thesis. She stayed with a local couple, a fishmonger and a ship's chandler. She spent a week on the trawler Filadelfia, working with a crew of local fishermen.

Her first book, Dark, Salt, Clear, written about Ash's time in Newlyn, was published by Bloomsbury in April 2020. In 2021, Ash won the Somerset Maugham Award for her memoir. The book was a BBC Radio 4 'Book of the Week'.

She is a freelance writer for the TLS and an English specialist for an education charity in Hackney.

Her second book, Don't Forget We're Here Forever: A New Generation's Search for Religion, published by Bloomsbury in May 2025, explores young people's search for meaning in an era of individualism and dwindling community spaces and why some are finding it in Christianity.
