= A. L. Barker =

English novelist and short-story writer (1918–2002)

A. L. Barker FRSL
- Born: Audrey Lilian Barker; 13 April 1918; St Pauls Cray, Kent, England
- Died: 21 February 2002 (aged 83)
- Occupations: Novelist and short-story writer
- Awards: Somerset Maugham Prize

Audrey Lilian Barker FRSL (13 April 1918 – 21 February 2002) was an English novelist and short-story writer.

== Biography ==
She was born in St Pauls Cray, Kent, and brought up in Beckenham. She was an only child. When Barker turned 16, her father sent her to work at a clockmaking firm, as he did not approve of her seeking further education. She worked in the editorial office of Amalgamated Press, as a publisher's reader for the Cresset Press, and at the BBC as a subeditor.

During her lifetime, Barker published ten collections of short stories and eleven novels, one of which – John Brown's Body – was shortlisted for the Booker Prize in 1970. She was also the winner of the inaugural Somerset Maugham Prize in 1947, with her collection of short stories called Innocents. In 1962, she won the Cheltenham Literary Festival award. Barker was also elected a fellow of the Royal Society of Literature in 1970.

Barker's work often included themes such as love, good vs. evil, youth vs. experience, and explored children as both the catalyst and victims of events. While not commercially successful during her lifetime, her writing has been well regarded by the literary critics and other authors over time. Rebecca West quote: "I am a fanatical admirer of A. L. Barker. If you cannot read her it is your fault. You should ask your vet to put you down if you do not admire The Middling or An Occasion for Embarrassment".

Gerald Murnane's novel Inland refers to Barker's 1981 book Life Stories.

In 1992, the BBC Radio produced dramatic readings for five of Barker's stories.

== Bibliography ==
=== Novels ===
- Apology for a Hero (1950)
- A Case Examined (1965)
- The Middling: Chapters in the Life of Ellie Toms (1967)
- John Brown's Body (1970)
- Source of Embarrassment (1974)
- A Heavy Feather (1978)
- Relative Successes (1984)
- The Gooseboy (1987)
- The Woman Who Talked to Herself (1989)
- Zeph (1992)
- The Haunt (1999)

=== Short story collections ===
- Innocents: Variations on a Theme (1947)
- Novelette, with Other Stories (1951)
- The Joy-Ride and After (1963)
- Lost Upon the Roundabouts (1964)
- Femina Real (1971)
- Life Stories (1981)
- No Word of Love (1985)
- Any Excuse for a Party: collected stories (1991)
- Element of Doubt (1992)
- Submerged: selected stories (2002)
