= Rodge Glass =

British writer (born 1978)

- Born: 17 January 1978 (age 48); Cheshire, England
- Education: Hebrew University of Jerusalem; University of Strathclyde; University of Glasgow
- Occupation: Writer
- Notable work: No Fireworks (2005); Alasdair Gray: A Secretary's Biography (2009)
- Awards: Dylan Thomas Prize (2006); Somerset Maugham Award (2009)

Rodge Glass (born 17 January 1978) is a British writer.

== Biography ==
Glass was born in Cheshire, England. He attended an "Orthodox Jewish Primary School, an 11+ All Boys Grammar School, a Co-Ed Private School, a Monk-sponsored Catholic College, [and] Hebrew University in Jerusalem." In 1997, Glass moved to Scotland to receive an undergraduate degree from the University of Strathclyde. For graduate school, he attended the University of Glasgow jointly with Strathclyde, where he was tutored by Alasdair Gray, James Kelman, Janice Galloway, and received a Master of Philosophy degree in Creative Writing. Between 2002 and 2005, Glass worked as a personal assistant to Alasdair Gray, which inspired his later biography of the writer. In 2008, he received a Doctor of Literature and Philosophy degree from the University of Glasgow. Glass's biography of Gray won a Somerset Maugham Award for Non-Fiction in 2009, when it was published in an updated edition.

Glass has worked as an editor and writer for multiple publications and written for The Guardian, The Paris Review, The Herald, The Scotsman, and others. In 2013, he began working as a senior lecturer at Edge Hill University and Fiction Editor at Freight Books." In 2020, he returned to Creative Writing at the University of Strathclyde, where he served as the convener of the Master of Letters programme in Creative Writing from 2020 to 2025 As of 2025, he is a Reader in Creative Writing at the University of Strathclyde.

Since publishing his biography of Alasdair Gray, Glass has continued to work in Gray Studies, publishing creative and critical work on the Glaswegian visual artist and writer. In 2022, Glass was co-convener of the 2nd International Alasdair Gray Conference, which featured newly commissioned work by Ali Smith and Jenny Brownrigg, and in his role at Strathclyde he has worked from 2020 to 2025 on a series of Creative Commissions with the Alasdair Gray Archive, where writers are invited to respond to an aspect of Gray's work. Writers featured in this series include: Chitra Ramaswamy, Michael Pedersen, Sara Sheridan and Denise Mina.

In recent years, Glass has hosted literary events at the Edinburgh International Book Festival, Boswell Book Festival, appeared at festivals in New York, Toronto and Rome, had books translated into Italian and Serbian, individual works translated into Spanish, French and Slovenian, and is a regular panellist on various radio shows. Since 2023, he has been a regular panellist on Radio Scotland's Sunday Morning show and he has appeared regularly on the BBC Radio 4 books programme Take Four Books, alongside the likes of A. L. Kennedy, Susan Barker and Melissa Lucashenko (2024–25). He has also appeared on Radio 4's The Third Degree, BBC2's Edinburgh Nights, BBC1's The One Show (discussing Alasdair Gray's murals), This Spiritual Life, the Faith Forum and multiple other programmes. In October 2025, Glass delivered Radio Scotland's Thought for the Day, the day after the Manchester synagogue attack.

Glass latest book was Joshua in the Sky: A Blood Memoir. The first book published in Europe on the rare blood condition HHT, it was an attempt to write the life of his nephew Joshua who lives for three hours after he was born in 2017. In interviews around publication, Glass discussed his approach to ethical memoir, writing lives that might otherwise go unseen, and how writing about Joshua's life saved his own. The book took the form of a series of essays, each responding to individual works of art, people, stories, poems and pictures. It also included chapters returning to Glass's writing on Michel Faber and Alasdair Gray. The book's chapter, "On the Covenant", won the Anne Brown Essay Prize for Scotland in 2023, and was longlisted for the Saltire Society Nonfiction Book of the Year in 2025.

Glass has toured extensively, discussing ethical approaches to writing biography and autobiography.

His latest work is a biography of the British band Suede, entitled As One, focusing on the years since their reformation in 2010. The book was published on 27 August 2026.

== Awards ==
Awards for Glass's writing
Year	Title	Award	Result	Ref.
2006	No Fireworks	Authors' Club First Novel Award	Nominee	
2006	No Fireworks	Dylan Thomas Prize	Nominee	
2006	No Fireworks	Glen Dimplex First Book Award	Shortlist	
2006	No Fireworks	Saltire Award	Nominee	
2009	Alasdair Gray: A Secretary's Biography	Scottish Arts Council Award for Non-Fiction	Nominee	
2009	Alasdair Gray: A Secretary's Biography	Somerset Maugham Award	Winner	
2010	Dougie's War: A Soldier's Story (with Dave Turbitt)	Scottish Design Awards, 2010	Nominee	
2013	LoveSexTravelMusik	Frank O’Connor Award	Nominee	
2023	'On the Covenant'	Anne Brown Essay Prize (hosted by Wigtown Book Festival)	Winner	
2025	Joshua in the Sky: A Blood Memoir	Saltire Society Nonfiction Book of the Year	Nominee	

== Publications ==
=== As editor ===
- The Storey's Story: Memories, Stories, Poems, Images (Litfest, 2004)
- The Year of Open Doors (Cargo, 2011)
- Second Lives: Tales From Two Cities with Jane Bernstein (Cargo, 2012)
- Articles of Faith by Michael Cannon (Freight, 2014)
- Head Land (Edge Hill University Press, 2016)

Glass has also worked as editor on multiple novels and short story collections from authors such as Ever Dundas' Goblin (winner of Saltire Society First Book of the Year) and James Yorkston, editing his novels Three Craws (Freight, 2016) and The Book of the Gaels (Oldcastle Books, 2022).

=== Biographies ===
- Alasdair Gray: A Secretary's Biography (2008)
- Michel Faber: The Writer & His Work (Liverpool University Press, 2023)
- Joshua in the Sky: A Blood Memoir (Taproot Press, 2024)
- As One: Remaking Suede (New Modern, 2026)

=== Novels ===
- No Fireworks (Faber & Faber, 2005)
- Hope for Newborns (Faber & Faber, 2008)
- Dougie's War with Dave Turbitt (Freight, 2010, graphic novel)
- Bring Me the Head of Ryan Giggs (Tindal Street Press, 2012 / Serpent's Tail, 2013)

=== Short story collections ===
- LoveSexTravelMusik: Stories for the EasyJet Generation (Freight, 2013)

=== Select short stories ===
- "We're All Gonna Have the Blues", in Beacons: Stories for our Not So Distant Future, edited by Gregory Norminton (Oneworld, 2013)
- "The Jim Hangovers" in Being Dad: Short Stories on Fatherhood (Tangent, 2016), edited by Dan Coxon
- "A Little Light" (2023, audio story, BBC Sounds children's Time for a Story series)
- 2The Magic of Stories2 (2024, audio story, BBC Sounds children's "Time for a Story" series)
- "Return to The Gorbals2 in New Writing Scotland 43: A Chaos of Light (ALS, 2025), edited by Kirstin Innes, Chris Powici and Niall O'Gallagher
