= Mark Blayney =

British writer

- Education: Royal Holloway
- Occupation: Writer
- Writing career
- Genres: Fiction, Poetry
- Notable work: Two Kinds of Silence (2003)
- Notable awards: Somerset Maugham Award, 2004

Mark Blayney (born 1973 or 1974) is a British writer. His collection of short stories Two Kinds of Silence won the Somerset Maugham Award in 2004.

== Biography ==
Blayney graduated from Royal Holloway in 1995, and spent more than a decade working at the Chartered Institute of Marketing.

Blayney has published in a range of genres, including novels, short stories and poetry. His first collection of short stories, Two Kinds of Silence, won the Somerset Maugham Award in 2004, making him the first self-published author to win the award.

In 2016, Blayney became a Hay Festival Writer at Work, a long-term development programme for selected writers born, living and/or educated in Wales. Blayney was one of the first cohort of writers, and completed a 10-day residency at the festival in both 2016 and 2017.

In 2023, his novel Invisibility won the 'Rheidol Prize for Prose with a Welsh Theme or Setting' at the New Welsh Writing Awards, organised by New Welsh Review. Blayney accepted his prize at a ceremony at the Hay Festival on 27 May.

Writing under the name Mark Blayney Stuart, he was nominated for 'Business Journalist of the Year' at the 2017 Wales Media Awards.

He lives in Cardiff, and has taught writing at Cardiff and Swansea universities. He is a Fellow of the Royal Literary Fund.

== Selected works ==
- Two Kinds of Silence
- Doppelgangers
- Loud Music Makes You Drive Faster
- The view from my shed
- This is not a pipe
- Invisibility
