= Marcel Theroux =

English-American novelist and broadcaster

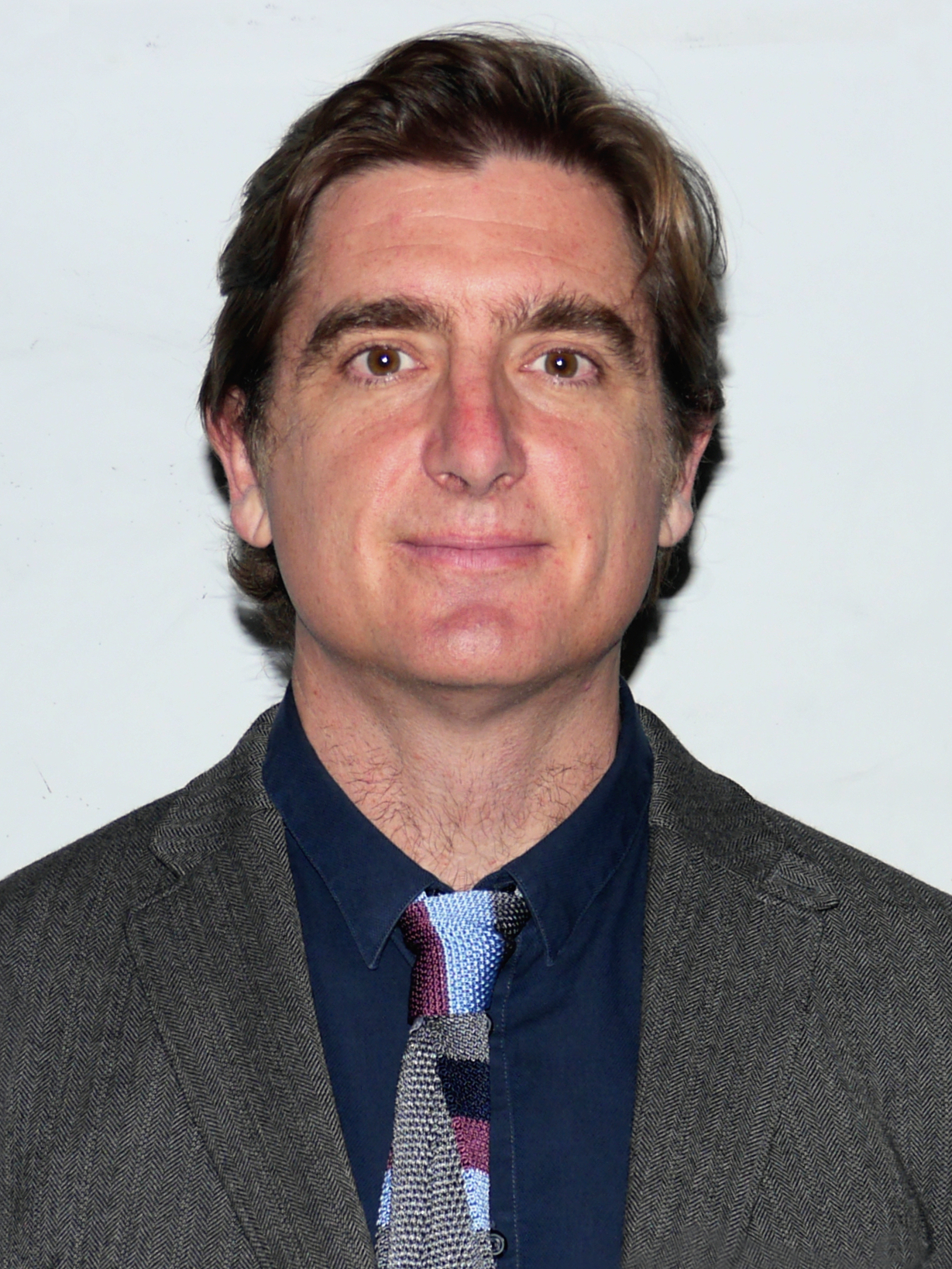
- Theroux in October 2017
- Born: 13 June 1968 (age 58); Kampala, Uganda
- Occupations: Novelist; broadcaster
- Years active: 2002–present
- Children: 2
- Relatives: Paul Theroux (father); Louis Theroux (brother); Justin Theroux (cousin); Alexander Theroux (uncle); Peter Theroux (uncle)
- Website: marceltheroux.com

Marcel Raymond Theroux (born 13 June 1968) is an English-American novelist and broadcaster. He has written novels such as The Confessions of Mycroft Holmes: A Paper Chase (2001), A Blow to the Heart (2006), Far North (2009), and Strange Bodies (2013). He won the Somerset Maugham Award for The Confessions of Mycroft Holmes and the John W. Campbell Memorial Award for Strange Bodies. He has also hosted documentaries on various topics and worked for TV news stations in New York City and Boston.

== Early life ==
Marcel Raymond Theroux was born on 13 June 1968 in Kampala, Uganda, the son of American travel writer Paul Theroux (who was teaching at Makerere University at the time) and his English then-wife Anne (née Castle). He is of French and Italian descent through his father. He is the older brother of documentary filmmaker Louis Theroux, the cousin of actor Justin Theroux, and the nephew of writers Alexander Theroux and Peter Theroux. He spent the first two years of his life in Singapore, where his father taught at the National University of Singapore and where his brother was born.

When Theroux was two years old, he moved with his family to his mother's native England, where he was raised in the Wandsworth area of London. After attending a state primary school, he boarded at Westminster School and became close friends with future deputy prime minister Nick Clegg. He studied English literature at Clare College, Cambridge, then won a fellowship to Yale University to study international relations with a specialisation in Soviet and East European Studies.

== Career ==
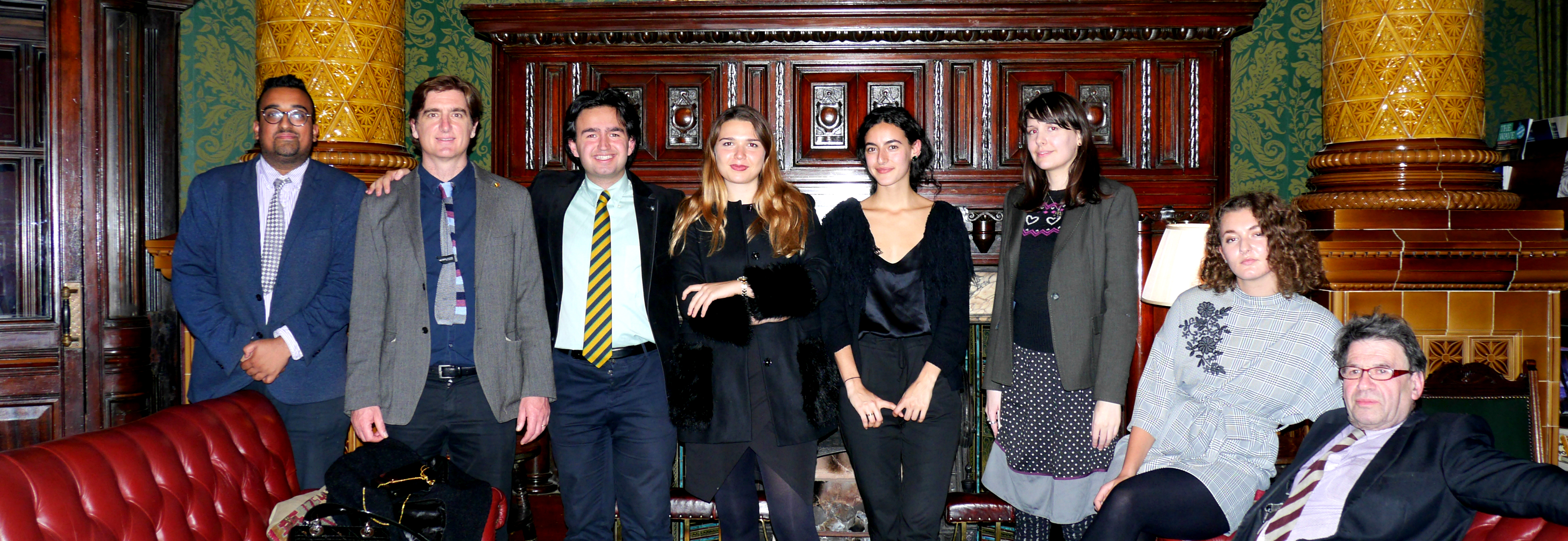
Theroux (second from left) in October 2017

Theroux began presenting documentaries for Channel 4's Unreported World series in 2000. In 2004, he presented The End of the World as We Know It, part of the War on Terra series about climate change. He was chosen as presenter because he originally knew nothing about the subject. He initially believed that all environmentalists were opposed to technological progress, but became convinced that the world faced a global problem on a scale so serious that an expansion of nuclear energy was probably the best solution. He interviewed Shell chairman Ron Oxburgh, but a PR assistant interrupted them; Oxburgh's negative views on the consequences of current oil consumption were likely considered detrimental to the corporation's image.

In March 2006, Theroux presented Death of a Nation on More4 as part of the State of Russia series. In the programme, he explored the country's post-Soviet problems, including population decline, the growing AIDS epidemic, and the persecution of the Meskhetian Turks. During interviews, he revealed that he is able to speak basic Russian. In September 2008, he presented Oligart: The Great Russian Art Boom, exploring the role of Russia's oligarchy in keeping the country's art history alive by buying and exhibiting domestic art.

In March 2009, Faber & Faber published Theroux's novel Far North, a future epic set in the Siberian taiga. That month, he presented In Search of Wabi-sabi on BBC Four, as part of the channel's Hidden Japan season of programming. He reported from Japan to explore the aesthetic tastes of Japan and its people. In 2012, he presented a documentary for Unreported World Series 23, on the subject of street children in Ukraine.

Theroux's novel Strange Bodies won the 2014 John W. Campbell Memorial Award for Best Science Fiction Novel. In 2017, he presented a documentary for Unreported World which explored the social and economic consequences of the recent rise in Orthodoxy and Russian nationalism under Vladimir Putin. In 2020, he presented another documentary for Unreported World, which explored middle-aged single Japanese men's obsession with junior idols and whether this was a quirk of Japanese culture or something more sinister.

== Personal life ==
Theroux lives in the Tooting area of London with his wife and their two children.

== Bibliography ==
- —— (2002). The Confessions of Mycroft Holmes: A Paper Chase. Harvest Books. ISBN 9780156007436.
- —— (2009). Far North: A Novel. Picador. ISBN 9780312429720.
- —— (2017). The Secret Books. Faber & Faber. ISBN 9780571281947.
- —— (2013). Strange Bodies: A Novel. Farrar, Straus and Giroux. ISBN 9780571297894.
- —— (2022). The Sorcerer of Pyongyang. Corsair. ISBN 9781668002667.
