= Peaces =

2021 novel by Helen Oyeyemi

- First edition (Faber, 2021)
- Author: Helen Oyeyemi
- Language: English
- Genre: Slipstream
- Publisher: Faber and Faber
- Publication date: 1 April 2021
- Publication place: United Kingdom
- Media type: Print (paperback), e-book, audiobook
- Pages: 272
- ISBN: 978-0-571-36658-3 (paperback)
- Dewey Decimal: 823/.92
- LC Class: PR6115.Y49 P43 2021

Peaces is a 2021 novel by Helen Oyeyemi. The novel takes place on a train with several passengers.

== Writing and composition ==
Oyeyemi has said the novel "[tries] to have a bit of back and forth with" Can Xue's novels Love In The New Millennium and The Last Lover as well as the writings of Carl Jung. The work of British writer Barbara Comyns also influenced the novel. The novel takes place on a fictional train, called the "Lucky Day" and Oyeyemi was "keen" from the outset of writing the book that it would be a "train book". While researching trains to write the book, Oyeyemi visited several of Ludwig II of Bavaria's castles.

== Critical reception ==
Sara Cutaia, in a review published by the Chicago Review of Books, referred to the novel as "delightfully weird and deliciously eccentric". Reviewers at other outlets, including NPR and Vox, also positively referred to the novel as "weird".
