= The Icarus Girl =

2005 debut novel by Helen Oyeyemi

- First edition
- Author: Helen Oyeyemi
- Language: English
- Genre: Fantasy
- Publisher: Bloomsbury
- Publication date: 1 January 2005
- Publication place: United Kingdom
- Media type: Print (hardcover and paperback), audiobook, e-book
- Pages: 353
- ISBN: 978-1405610988

The Icarus Girl is the debut novel written by British author Helen Oyeyemi and published by Bloomsbury in 2005. The story follows Jessamy "Jess" Harrison, an eight-year-old girl born to an English father and a Nigerian mother.

== Background ==
Oyeyemi wrote the horror novel when she was 18 while studying for her A levels at Cardinal Vaughan Memorial School. She wrote the book on her parents' computer on weekends, after school and in the middle of the night.

== Reception ==
The New York Times said that the novel is "Deserving of all its praise, this is a masterly first novel -- and a nightmarish story that will haunt Oyeyemi's readers for months to come." Ali Smith writing for The Guardian observed: "The Icarus Girl's real tragic inevitability lies in the fracture of childhood into the shock of maturity itself; a bleakness in the light, bright state of childhood is the real subject of this curiously wild, curiously blithely-voiced novel...Its simple-seeming rewrite of the simplest of imaginative impulses goes further than an analysis of cultural and personal displacement to suggest that no childhood is ever normal, that the strains between parents and children will inevitably break you whichever you happen to be." Publishers Weekly noted: "As sophisticated as she is, Jess's eight-year-old observations provide a limited lens, and at times, the novel's fantasy element veers into young adult suspense territory." Kirkus Reviews stated: "Narrated from Jess's point-of-view, this ambitious psychodrama becomes repetitive in structure and can't always sustain the adult tone. A conclusion in Nigeria attempts to knit Jess's three worlds-the actual, the spiritual and the "Bush"-but doesn't wholly rescue or resolve a story rich in material yet technically imbalanced."

The novel was nominated for an Otherwise Award in 2005. In the UK, The Icarus Girl has sold 20,799 copies in paperback through Nielsen BookScan's UK Total Consumer Market, as of 2020.

== See also ==
- Abiku
