= Nell Stevens =

British writer (born 1985)

Nell Stevens FRSL
- Born: 1985 (age 40–41)
- Education: University of Warwick; Harvard University; Boston University (MA); King's College London (PhD)
- Occupations: Writer of memoirs and fiction
- Awards: Somerset Maugham Award

Nell Stevens (born 1985) is an English writer of memoirs and fiction. She is an assistant professor in the University of Warwick School of Creative Arts, Performance and Visual Cultures, where she teaches on the Warwick Writing Programme and lists her research interests as "historical fiction, autofiction, life writing, hybrid forms".

Stevens was elected a Fellow of the Royal Society of Literature (FRSL) in 2026.

== Early life ==
Stevens grew up in Oxford, her father a GP and her mother an economics academic. Stevens attended Oxford High School. She graduated with a degree in English and Creative Writing from the University of Warwick and spent a postgraduate year studying Arabic at Harvard. She completed a Master of Arts (MA) at Boston University on the Global Fellows in Fiction programme. She later pursued a PhD at King's College London.

== Writing ==
Stevens has published two memoirs. Bleaker House (2017) is about a period living on Bleaker Island in the South Atlantic. Mrs Gaskell and Me (2018) draws on her own life and that of the English novelist Elizabeth Gaskell (1810–1865). She won a 2019 Somerset Maugham Award for Mrs Gaskell and Me.

She was shortlisted for the 2018 BBC National Short Story Award, and has written for publications including The New York Times, Vogue, The Paris Review, The New York Review of Books, The Guardian and Granta.

Her first novel, Briefly, a Delicious Life, was published in 2022. Narrated by a fifteenth-century ghost, it is a fictional account of a holiday in Mallorca taken by George Sand, Frédéric Chopin, Sand's children, and a maid, Amélie.

Stevens appeared on BBC Radio 4's Open Book in January 2023, where she and Tom Crewe "discuss[ed] drawing creatively on marginal – and radical – LGBTQ voices from the 19th century".

Her second novel, The Original, was shortlisted for the James Tait Black Prize for fiction in 2026. The Original follows the lives of cousins and artists Grace and Charles. The novel raises questions about originality and authenticity, through Grace's creation of forgeries and copies and through Charles's return, somewhat altered, fifteen years after being lost at sea.

== Personal life ==
Stevens lives in London with her wife and two children.

== Selected publications ==
- —— (2017). Bleaker House: Chasing My Novel to the End of the World. London: Picador. ISBN 9781509824410.
- —— (2018). Mrs Gaskell and Me: Two Women, Two Love Stories, Two Centuries Apart. London: Picador. ISBN 9781509868216.
- —— (2022). Briefly, a Delicious Life. London: Picador. ISBN 9781529083422.
- —— (2025). The Original. Scribner UK. ISBN 9781398533387.
