= The Opposite House =

Book by Helen Oyeyemi

- First edition (UK)
- Author: Helen Oyeyemi
- Language: English
- Published: 2007
- Publisher: Bloomsbury Press

The Opposite House is a novel by British author Helen Oyeyemi first published by Bloomsbury Press in 2007.

== Plot ==
Maja Carmen Carrera, the British daughter of scholarly Cuban immigrants struggles with faith as she awaits the birth of her first child.
