= Ben Wilson (author) =

British historian

Benjamin Kenneth Wilson (born 1980) is a British historian. He is best known for his 2009 book What Price Liberty? which won the Somerset Maugham Award, and the bestselling history of the British Navy titled Empire of the Deep (2013). Other titles include Heyday:The Dawn of the Golden Age, Metropolis: A History of Humankind’s Greatest Invention and Urban Jungle. His books have been widely praised by critics.

Wilson graduated with a BA in History from Pembroke College, Cambridge in 2001. He contributes regularly to broadcast and print media, and has written for The Spectator, The Literary Review, and The Guardian among others.
