= Aalst (play) =

Play by Pol Heyvaert

Aalst is a play by the Belgian stage director Pol Heyvaert. Based on real-life events that took place in the town of Aalst in 1999, the play recounts the murder of two children by their parents. It was originally performed in 2005 by the Ghent-based theatre company Victoria. Since then, it has toured extensively in Europe and in Canada.

== The background ==
In January 1999, in the suburban Belgian town of Aalst, Luc de Winne and Maggie Strobbe checked into a hotel room with their two children, a boy aged seven and an infant girl of three months. They killed the daughter by suffocating her with a pillow, and the son by stabbing him with a pair of scissors. They were subsequently arrested, tried and sentenced to life imprisonment. The case caused a sensation in Belgium and was the subject of massive coverage in the press and media.

== The play ==
In 2005, Pol Heyvaert, a veteran stage designer who had a long-standing relationship with the Victoria theatre company, gave the story dramatic form. Heyvaert and his co-writer Dimitri Verhulst drew extensively on original source material, including statements and interviews given by the accused, television footage of the trial and a documentary on the murder investigation. Heyvaert also designed and directed the play, his first outing as a stage director.

The format of the play is simple. Separated by a few feet, the couple sit on two chairs with a microphone stand in front of each. A white curtain hangs behind them. The stage is bare of any other furnishing. Over the next 70-odd minutes, the two are interrogated by a disembodied, authoritative voice, and the story of their lives and that of the murder of the children pours forth.

It transpires that both parents had had horrific childhoods. The woman had been sexually abused by her father while the man had been raised in foster care and had become a petty criminal at an early age. They are both unemployed and live off generous state benefits, supplemented by income from moonlighting. Both exhibit a sense of entitlement and a lack of responsibility. They order consumer goods off catalogues, including three television sets and five stereos, but never pay for these items. Their domestic arrangements are wanting as well. Their house is filthy and constantly in the dark, with the bulbs painted black. Their relationship too is abusive and codependent. The murder of the children is described at length and in detail. The parents excuse their actions by saying that they did not want their children to be taken away by the state and put into foster care, and that they did not want them to suffer in life as they themselves had done. At the very end of the play, doubt is thrown over the veracity of their testimony.

With its difficult subject-matter and frequently graphic detail, Aalst has been described as a 'disturbing' and 'complex' play, one that raises hard questions about individual morality and the welfare society.

The play has been produced in theatres and festivals across Europe. The Scottish writer Duncan McLean has also adapted Aalst into a Scottish version. In March 2007, this version made its UK debut at the Tramway theatre in Glasgow as a joint production of Victoria and the National Theatre of Scotland. Kate Dickie and David McKay played the lead roles under Heyvaert's direction. The play then went on tour and made its London debut in April 2007 at the Soho Theatre.
