= Boy, Snow, Bird =

2014 novel by British author Helen Oyeyemi

- First edition
- Author: Helen Oyeyemi
- Language: English
- Genre: Contemporary fantasy
- Published: Picador
- Publication date: 2014
- Pages: 308
- ISBN: 9781594631399

Boy, Snow, Bird is a 2014 novel by British author Helen Oyeyemi. The novel, Oyeyemi's fifth, was a loose retelling of the fairytale Snow White. Oyeyemi also cited the Nella Larsen novel Passing as an inspiration. The novel was named as one of the best books of 2014 by The New York Times, The Washington Post, NPR, and BuzzFeed.

== Plot ==
Boy Novak, a young white girl, is raised by an abusive father who works as a rat exterminator and whom she refers to as the rat catcher. In the winter of 1953, when she is twenty years old, Boy runs away from her father, and moves from New York to Flax Hill. In Flax Hill, Boy stumbles across a tenement house and begins to go on double dates with one of the other tenants who introduces her to her boyfriend's business partner, a jewellery designer and widower called Arturo Whitman. Arturo eventually tells Boy that he has a young daughter named Snow.

While Boy and Arturo initially have a tempestuous relationship, they grow closer as Boy is enchanted by Snow. On a weekend trip, Arturo proposes to Boy by giving her a bracelet shaped like a trickster. She thinks of the bracelet as evil step-mother jewellery, but she accepts it. Boy and Arturo have a quick wedding, after which she learns that Arturo has an older sister, Clara, who is shunned by the rest of the family.

Boy becomes pregnant and gives birth to a girl she names Bird. As soon as Bird is born, Boy realizes that Bird is black. Boy interrogates Arturo, who reveals that his father and mother were white-passing African-Americans from Louisiana. He also reveals that his first wife Julia was descended from white-passing African-Americans, and they were both relieved when Snow was born with light skin.

Boy grows increasingly frustrated over the different ways in which the family and the town react to Bird and becomes jealous of Snow. She finally reaches out to Clara, who tells her to give Bird to her to raise, as she—Clara—was once given up by her mother, when she was not passing as white. Instead, Boy asks Clara to take Snow for what she claims is a short visit, in reality planning to have her stay indefinitely.

Thirteen years later, in 1968, Bird grows up as the only daughter in the Whitman family, while her father visits Snow twice a month. Bird discovers a series of letters Snow wrote to her mother in which she begs to be able to come home and fails to understand what she might have done to upset Boy. The last letter in Boy's collection is one addressed to Bird, which Bird decides to answer.

Bird and Snow begin a secret correspondence and Bird learns more of the secret Whitman history. Eventually, because of their correspondence, Boy allows Snow to come home to visit.

Before Snow can come, Bird is temporarily attacked and kidnapped from her backyard by a man who reveals himself to be her grandfather, the rat catcher, who reveals his name to be Frank Novak. After a tense and unhappy conversation Frank leaves Bird, never to return again.

At Thanksgiving the entire Whitman family is reunited, including Clara and her husband John. Boy asks Snow to forgive her for sending her away and encourages Snow to punch her in order to settle the score between them. Boy also asks Snow to stay with them in Flax Hill for a while longer, and Snow accepts her offer.

Boy's journalist friend Mia arrives at her door one day to confess that she was the one who gave Boy's address to Frank. Mia, a single woman, admits that she wanted to write an article about women who could not be mothers, and she decided to track down Boy's mother, finding out her name was Frances Amelia Novak. Frances was an extremely intelligent feminist and doctoral candidate who was also a lesbian. Because of her lesbianism she was raped by an acquaintance. Frances became pregnant by the rape and during the pregnancy transitioned into a man and began calling himself Frank. After Mia confronted Frank about his former identity she told him to tell Boy the truth of his origins before the article was published. He had gone to Flax Hill to do this, before leaving because he was unable to talk about it.

Boy decides to go to New York to try and see her father and determine if she can find Frances within him. She takes Mia, Bird and Snow with her.

== Reception ==
The Guardian called it "an intriguing, sinuously attractive book".

The Globe and Mail praised Oyeyemi for being "one of the few storytellers who seems on intimate terms with the language of myth". The New York Times praised the book for its prose and themes, calling it a "cautionary tale on post-race ideology, racial limbos and the politics of passing." Some bloggers and reviewers have criticized the book for its transphobic ending.
