= Phoenicia Rogerson =

British-Portuguese writer (born 1996)

- Born: Phoenicia Alexandra Scott Rogerson; 1996 (age 29–30); Windsor, England
- Citizenship: Portugal; United Kingdom
- Education: University College London (BA)
- Occupation: Writer
- Writing career
- Language: English
- Years active: 2023–present
- Notable works: Herc; Aphrodite
- Notable awards: Somerset Maugham Award (2024)
- Website: phoeniciarogerson.com

Phoenicia Alexandra Scott Rogerson (born 1996) is a British-Portuguese writer. Her debut novel Herc (2023) received a Somerset Maugham Award in 2024.

== Early life and education ==
Rogerson was born in Windsor, Berkshire and grew up in Cornwall. She attended Truro and Penwith College. She graduated with a degree in linguistics from University College London. While she was at university, two of her short stories were shortlisted for successive UCL Publishers' Prize anthologies.

== Career ==
In 2022, Rogerson signed a two-book deal with HQ (a HarperCollins imprint), through which her debut novel Herc was published in August 2023. The novel retells the mythology of Hercules. Herc received a Somerset Maugham Award in 2024. It was selected as a Waterstones Book of the Month in August 2023.

Rogerson's second novel Aphrodite was published in 2025. The Sunday Times included Aphrodite in its list of the best historical fiction of 2025.

In addition, Rogerson designed the micro role-playing game The Family Dinner, published by Button Shy and Matagot in English and French.

== Personal life ==
Rogerson is based in London. Her other interests include knitting and outdoor swimming.

== Bibliography ==
=== Novels ===
- Herc (2023)
- Aphrodite (2025)
- Isolde (2026)

=== Role-playing games ===
- The Family Dinner (2022)

=== Short stories ===
- Vampire Squid from Hell (2018)
