= Stephanie Sy-Quia =

British-American writer

- Born: 1995 (age 30–31); California, U.S.
- Education: The King's School, Canterbury; University of Oxford
- Occupation: Writer
- Notable work: Amnion (2021)
- Awards: Forward Prize for Poetry (Best First Collection, 2022); Somerset Maugham Award; Eric Gregory Award

Stephanie Sy-Quia (born 1995) is a British–American writer. Her first novel, A Private Man, was published in 2026.

== Biography ==
Born in California and now living in London, Sy-Quia attended the The King's School, Canterbury, then went on to study English at Oxford University.

She has written for publications including The Guardian, The White Review, Boston Review, Granta, Los Angeles Review of Books, The London Magazine, Tribune, and The TLS. Sy-Quia is a Ledbury Poetry Critic and has been shortlisted for the Bodley Head Essay Prize.

Her debut poetry collection, Amnion, was published by Granta in 2021 and won the Forward Prize for Poetry (Best First Collection, 2022), the Somerset Maugham Award, the Eric Gregory Award, and was the Poetry Book Society's Winter Recommendation. Amnion was also longlisted for the Rathbones Folio and RSL Ondaatje Prizes.

Sy-Quia's debut novel, A Private Man, was published in 2026, with its author being chosen by The Observer as one of the year's best debut novelists.
