= Philip Marsden =

English travel writer and novelist (born 1961)

Philip Marsden-Smedley (born 11 May 1961), known professionally as Philip Marsden is an English writer who has written in several different genres - travel writing, nature writing, history and fiction. His work has been translated into more than fifteen languages.

Born in Bristol, England, Marsden has a degree in anthropology and worked for some years for The Spectator magazine. He became a full-time writer in the late 1980s. He was elected as a Fellow of The Royal Society of Literature in 1996.

A review of his work by Guy Mannes-Abbott appeared in The Independent newspaper in November 2007.

He lives in Cornwall with his wife, the writer Charlotte Hobson (daughter of Anthony Hobson), and their children.

Marsden's maternal grandfather was Sir James Granville le Neve King of Campsie, 3rd Baronet of the King baronetcy of Campsie in the County of Stirling. Marsden is a first cousin of the current Baronet, Sir James Rupert King of Campsie, 5th Baronet.

Marsden is descended from John Smedley, founder of the eponymous luxury clothing brand which has remained a family business since 1794.

== Awards and honours ==
- 1994: Somerset Maugham Award for The Crossing Place
- 1996: Elected as a Fellow of the Royal Society of Literature
- 1999: Thomas Cook Travel Book Award for The Spirit-Wrestlers
- 2013: Honorary Fellowship awarded by Falmouth University
- 2015: Rising Ground: A Search for the Spirit of Place shortlisted for Stanford Dolman Travel Book of the Year
- 2015: Rising Ground: A Search for the Spirit of Place - winner of three categories in the Holyer an Gof awards

== Selected publications ==
=== Historical and travel writing ===
- A Far Country: travels in Ethiopia, Century, 1990, ISBN 0-7126-2566-6
- The Crossing Place: a journey among the Armenians, HarperCollins, 1993, ISBN 0-00-215878-7 (Somerset Maugham Award in 1994). This book is being currently translated into Spanish thanks to an Artist Residency granted by the Banff Centre in Alberta, Canada, and the Mexican National Fund for Culture and the Arts.
- The Bronski House: a return to the Borderlands, HarperCollins, 1995, ISBN 0-00-255630-8 – "a story of multi-generational Polish exile involving Zofia Ilinska, friend, neighbour and poet"
- The Spirit-Wrestlers: a Russian journey, HarperCollins, 1998 (Thomas Cook Travel Book Award 1999)
- The Chains of Heaven: An Ethiopian Romance, HarperCollins, 2005, ISBN 0-00-717347-4
- The Barefoot Emperor: An Ethiopian Tragedy, HarperPress, 2007, ISBN 0-00-717345-8 (A life of Tewodros II).
- The Levelling Sea: The Story of a Cornish Haven in the Age of Sail, HarperPress, 2011, ISBN 978-0-00-717453-9
- Rising Ground: A Search for the Spirit of Place, Granta, 2014, ISBN 978-1847086280
- The Summer Isles: A Voyage Of The Imagination, Granta, 2019, ISBN 978-1783782994
- Under a Metal Sky: A Journey through Minerals, Greed and Wonder, Granta 2025

=== Novels ===
- The Main Cages, Flamingo, 2002, ISBN 0-00-713639-0 - set in Cornwall during the mid-1930s.

=== Spectator anthologies ===
- Views from Abroad: the Spectator book of travel writing, edited by Philip Marsden-Smedley and Jeffrey Klinke, London: Grafton, 1988, ISBN 0-586-08896-2
- Articles of War: the Spectator book of World War II, edited by Fiona Glass and Philip Marsden-Smedley, London: Grafton, 1989, ISBN 0-246-13394-5
- Britain in the Eighties: the Spectator’s view of the Thatcher decade, edited by Philip Marsden-Smedley, Grafton, 1989, ISBN 0-246-13395-3
