= London Pride (song) =

Song composed by Noël Coward

"London Pride" is a patriotic song written and composed by Noël Coward during the Blitz in World War II.

== Composition ==
Noël Coward wrote "London Pride" in the spring of 1941, during the Blitz. According to his own account, he was sitting on a seat on a platform in Paddington station, watching Londoners going about their business quite unfazed by the broken glass scattered around from the station's roof damaged by the previous night's bombing: in a moment of patriotic pride, he said that suddenly he recalled an old English folk song which had been apparently appropriated by the Germans for their national anthem, and it occurred to him that he could reclaim the melody in a new song. Coward stated that "The song started in my head then and there and was finished in a couple of days."

The song has six verses. The opening lines, repeated three times within the song, are:

London Pride has been handed down to us,
London Pride is a flower that's free.
London Pride means our own dear town to us,
And our pride it forever will be.

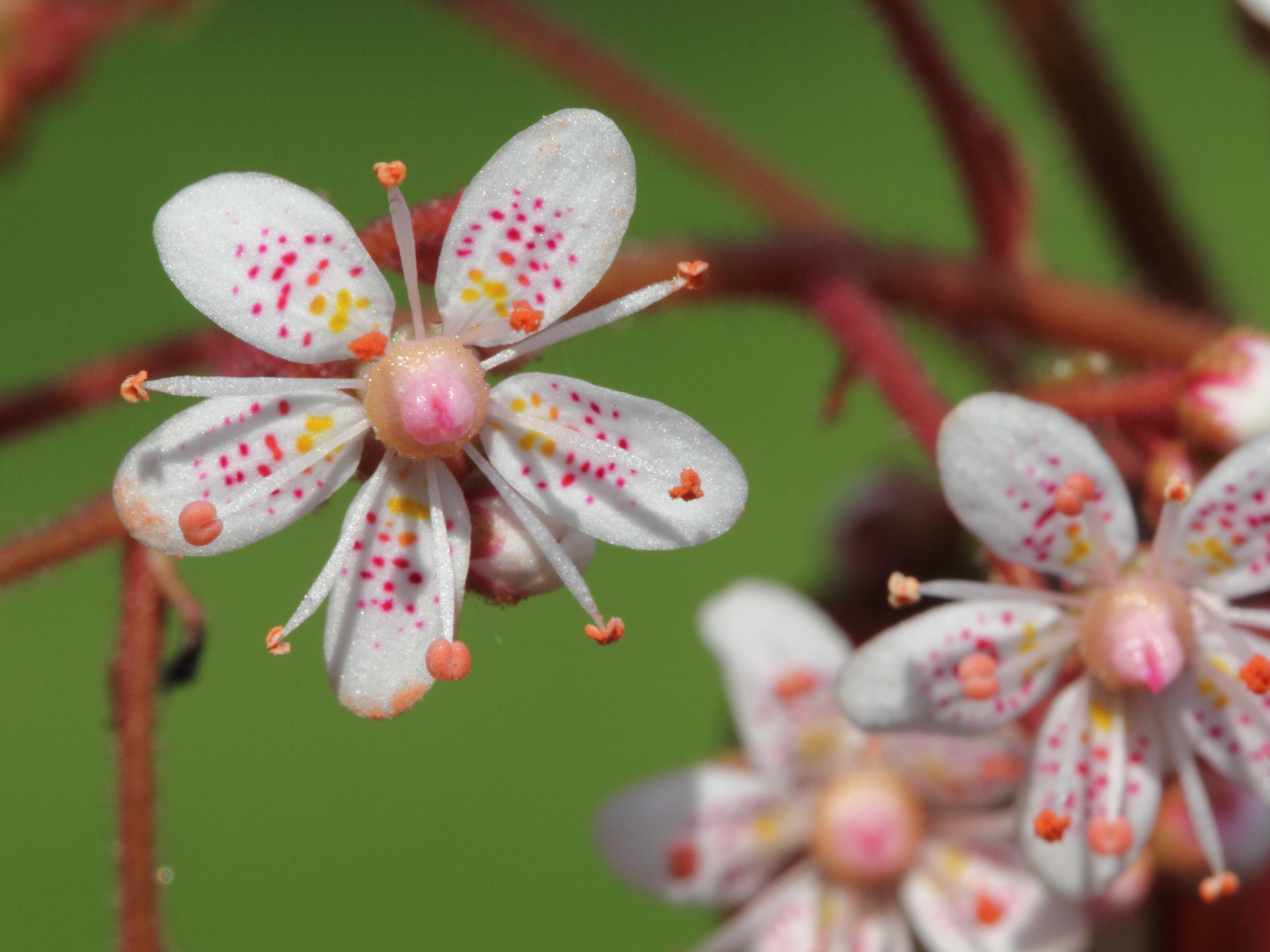
"London Pride", Saxifraga × urbium

The flower mentioned is Saxifraga × urbium, a perennial garden flowering plant historically known as London Pride, which was said to have rapidly colonised the bombed sites of the Blitz.

== Melody ==
Coward acknowledged one of the traditional cries of London, "Won't You Buy My Sweet-Blooming Lavender", as the starting-point for the tune.

Coward's biographer, Oliver Soden, remarks the "compositional flair" revealed in the melody. He states that its harmony matches that of the chimes of Westminster's Big Ben, so the signature "sound of London [is] stitched into the harmonic scheme of the song". Further, Soden states that the first phrases of the melody "very subtly" incorporate the melody of the German national anthem, "Deutschland über alles", describing this as "musical warfare".

== Usage ==
The music is used in David Lean's 1944 film This Happy Breed (based on the 1939 play of the same name by Coward), including the closing titles.

The song has been covered by artists such as Donald Peers in 1941, Gracie Fields in 1958, and Cleo Laine in 1977.

Julie Andrews sang the song on her 1957 debut album, The Lass with the Delicate Air. Damon Albarn and Michael Nyman recorded the song in 1998 for the Twentieth-Century Blues: The Songs of Noël Coward tribute album. To mark the 100th anniversary of Noël Coward's birth, Jeremy Irons sang a selection of his songs at the 1999 Last Night of the Proms held at the Royal Albert Hall in London, ending with "London Pride". In May 2015, Alexander Armstrong performed the song at VE Day 70: A Party to Remember at Horse Guards Parade in London.

== See also ==
- London Pride, a beer created by Fuller's in 1959
- Streets of London, a 1969 song by Ralph McTell
