= Even the Dogs =

Book by Jon McGregor

- First UK edition cover
- Author: Jon McGregor
- Language: English
- Genre: novel, experimental novel
- Publisher: Bloomsbury Publishing, London
- Publication date: 1 February 2010
- Publication place: United Kingdom
- Media type: Print (Hardcover, Paperback)
- Pages: 208 pp
- ISBN: 1-408-80947-8
- Preceded by: So Many Ways To Begin (2007)

Even the Dogs is British author Jon McGregor's third novel. First published in 2010, the novel focuses on drug addiction, alcoholism, homelessness, and dereliction. The Irish Times literary critic Eileen Battersby called it a "magnificent" novel. In 2012, Even the Dogs was awarded the International Dublin Literary Award, one of the world's richest literary prizes.

The Daily Telegraph published a positive review by David Robson, who remarked that the "movingly told story is also an important book."

== Plot summary ==
Around Christmas one year, alcoholic Robert John Radcliffe's body is found in his flat. The novel traces, in a stream of consciousness style with occasional flashbacks, how his daughter Laura and her drug addict friends react as authorities investigate his death.

== See also ==
- 2010 in literature
- If Nobody Speaks of Remarkable Things
