= If Nobody Speaks of Remarkable Things =

2002 novel by Jon McGregor

- First edition
- Author: Jon McGregor
- Language: English
- Publisher: Bloomsbury
- Publication date: 2002
- Publication place: United Kingdom
- Media type: Print
- Pages: 275
- ISBN: 0-7475-5833-7
- Followed by: So Many Ways To Begin

If Nobody Speaks of Remarkable Things is British writer Jon McGregor's first novel, which was first published by Bloomsbury in 2002. It portrays a day in the life of a suburban British street, with the plot alternately following the lives of the street's various inhabitants. All but one person's viewpoint is described in the third person, and the narrative uses a flowing grammatical style which mimics their thought processes.

Receiving generally positive critical reviews, the book notably won the prestigious Somerset Maugham Award, issued by the Society of Authors.

== Inspiration ==
On his website, Jon McGregor explains that the book began partly as a book about the reaction to the death of Princess Diana, set in 'a street where life was going on regardless'. His aim was 'to take a day in the life of one street in a city, and try to show the vast multiplicity of stories which were happening there, and to look at how those stories interacted with each other in an environment where people were constantly moving in and out and rarely knew each other’s names'. He goes on to state that the setting is Bradford, where McGregor lived in the late 1990s.

== Plot summary ==
If Nobody Speaks of Remarkable Things eschews a traditional narrative structure, instead moving from one resident of an unnamed English street to another, describing their actions and inner world over the course of a single day, the last day of Summer in 1997. These characters are not named, and are described by an omniscient third person narrator. These sections are intercut with another character, a young woman who has recently discovered that she is pregnant, who narrates in the first person and whose story covers several days. She regularly refers ambiguously to a day in the past when something terrible happened, and it gradually becomes clear that the rest of the novel is set during this day.

== Awards and nominations ==
If Nobody Speaks of Remarkable Things was longlisted for the Booker Prize, and in 2003 won both the Betty Trask Prize and the Somerset Maugham Award.

== Reception ==
If Nobody Speaks of Remarkable Things received largely favourable reviews from critics. William Leith, writing for The Daily Telegraph, stated "this is an ordinary world, shabby and melancholy, but McGregor describes it with mesmeric power...It all works extremely well," and David Wiegand said in the San Francisco Chronicle that the characters "become momentarily vivid through his keen sense of detail and lyrical writing style." Writing for The Guardian, however, Julie Myerson stated that "though you couldn't say this is a poor novel...it would be hard to imagine a paler one, its lifeblood sucked out by a Virginia Woolfish adherence to the fey, the pretend, the fortuitously elegant."

== See also ==
- 2002 in literature
- Even the Dogs
