= Oliver Soden =

English biographer

Oliver Soden (born 1990) is an English writer. He studied at Lancing College in Sussex and at Clare College, Cambridge.

Soden's first published book was the authorized biography of the English composer Michael Tippett, a task he took over following the death of Dennis Marks. Well received by critics, Michael Tippett was shortlisted for the Elizabeth Longford Prize for Historical Biography and the HWA Non-Fiction Crown, and won both the Royal Philharmonic Society Storytelling Award and the Somerset Maugham Award.

His next book, titled Jeoffry the Poet's Cat (2020), purported to be a biography of the 18th-century cat that kept the poet Christopher Smart company during his confinement in a succession of mental asylums. Smart dedicated a poem fragment in Jubilate Agno to his cat, a piece now known as "For I will consider my cat Jeoffry". The Times Literary Supplement chose Jeoffry the Poet's Cat as one of its Books of the Year.

In 2023, Soden published Masquerade, the first major biography of Noël Coward in 30 years.

Soden is also a journalist and broadcaster, and has contributed to The Guardian, The Spectator, Prospect magazine, and the BBC, among others.
