= Mya-Rose Craig =

English ornithologist and activist (born 2002)

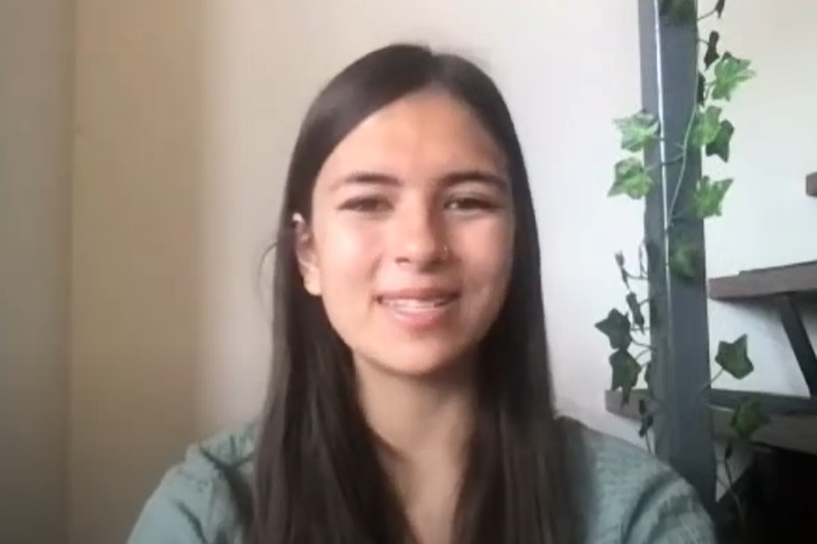
- Craig in 2022
- Born: Mya-Rose Shanti Craig; 7 May 2002 (age 24); Bristol, England

Mya-Rose Craig (born 2002), also known as Birdgirl, is an amateur English ornithologist, environmental activist, and author. Her birdwatching achievements include becoming the youngest person to see half of the world's bird species and holding a Guinness World Record for birding on all seven continents.

== Early life and education ==
She was born in Bristol, England. Her father, Christopher Craig, is an engineer, and her mother, Helena Craig, is a lawyer of Bangladeshi heritage. Her parents have used their wealth to support Craig's ambitions since retiring in 2010 after her mother was sectioned and have paid for her to travel the world. Craig followed her father's interest in birdwatching. She launched a conservation blog at age eleven, writing about birding, conservation, environmental issues and environmental inclusion.

== Ornithology ==
Craig was introduced to birdwatching by her father. In 2009, at the age of seven, she undertook a "big year", aiming to observe the maximum number of bird species within a specific geographical area over a calendar year. She successfully identified 325 bird species in the UK, making her the youngest individual worldwide to accomplish this challenge. In 2012, when Craig was 10, her parents decided to take her out of school for six months and homeschool her themselves, to take her on an extensive trip. The family used their independent wealth to birdwatch in Colombia, Bolivia, Peru, Australia, Uganda, Rwanda, and Kenya.

Craig appeared on the 2010 BBC Four documentary "Twitchers: A Very British Obsession." Afterwards she appeared on Springwatch, Countryfile, and The One Show.

At age 11, she started her blog Birdgirl to share her passion for birds. The following year, she campaigned to raise $35,000 for a Bangladeshi charity to deal with the 2014 Sundarbans oil spill.

In 2015, after reaching Brown Bluff on the Antarctic Peninsula, Craig achieved a Guinness World Record for being the youngest female to birdwatch on all continents.

By the age of seventeen, Craig had recorded sightings of more than 5,000 bird species worldwide. She achieved her 5,000th recorded sighting a rock bunting at the Castle of Loarre in northern Spain. The sighting also marked her observation of half the bird species listed on the IOC World Bird List, making her the youngest known individual to reach that milestone.

By 2019, Craig's birding expeditions had taken her to thirty-eight countries across all seven continents, including Australia, Egypt, the Arctic aboard Greenpeace's research vessel MV Arctic Sunrise, and multiple visits to the Amazon rainforest.

In 2015, after discovering the American Birding Association's teen birding camps, she organised a similar youth birding camp in the United Kingdom, an initiative which later evolved into the charity Black2Nature.

She holds a British Trust for Ornithology (BTO) bird ringing permit holder and carries out research through bird ringing and bird nest box surveys which means checking, surveying, carrying scientific procedures' and recording.

== Activism ==
Craig is an advocate for increased equality in naturalism and environmentalism and has campaigned to improve diversity in conservation work. Reflecting on her childhood experiences with birdwatching, Craig recalls the predominantly white and male demographic of the community. Initially feeling comfortable due to her long-standing involvement, around the age of 13 or 14, she began to perceive the lack of diversity within the birdwatching community as unusual. People questioned her interest in the hobby, prompting her to ponder why certain demographics were more prevalent in such pursuits. This realisation sparked her curiosity about inclusivity and diversity in nature-related activities prompting her to advocate for inclusivity in outdoor activities.

Craig created her first nature conference, attended by naturalists including Bill Oddie, at the age of 13. Her older sister's reduced birding time after having a baby spurred Craig to seek out other young naturalists. Discovering the American Birding Association's teen summer camps online, her parents proposed organising similar camps herself. Identifying a lack of diversity in birding communities, particularly among British Bangladeshi backgrounds, she founded Black2Nature in 2015 at 14 to run nature camps for minority ethnic children. The initiative addresses the underrepresentation of these communities in environmental fields by offering urban youth opportunities to explore and engage with nature, aiming to prompt change and promote equity within the environmental sector.

Craig was a "Bristol 2015 Ambassador" during the city's year as European Green Capital. In 2018, she contributed to Chris Packham's A People's Manifesto for Wildlife and was enlisted as the manifesto's "minister of diversity". Craig campaigned with Greta Thunberg at the Youth Strike 4 Climate event in Bristol in February 2020. She has organised conferences featuring celebrity nature enthusiasts such as Bill Oddie, Chris Packham, and RSPB chief executive Beccy Speight.

In September 2020, in a publicity stunt co-ordinated by Greenpeace, Craig staged the most northerly climate strike, by protesting on an Arctic ice floe north of Svalbard, at 82.2° N, highlighting the urgency of climate action ahead of the United Nations Summit on Biodiversity.

In August 2022, she was announced as an Oxfam Ambassador and spoke on their stage at Glastonbury Festival. Craig is also an ambassador for Greenpeace, the National Trust The Wildlife Trusts, The Beaver Trust and the RSPCA.

== Writing and publications ==
Craig is an author whose work focuses on memoir, environmental advocacy, ornithology, and youth-focused conservation education. Her first book, We Have a Dream(2021), profiles thirty young Indigenous people and people of colour working in environmental activism and explores issues of climate justice and representation within the environmental movement. Her second book, Birdgirl (2022), is a memoir that recounts her experiences as a young birder and environmental activist while reflecting on family life, identity, and mental health. The book was praised by Margaret Atwood as “lyrical, poignant and insightful.” Her third book, Flight (2023), is an illustrated children's work exploring bird migration and the natural world from a bird's-eye perspective.

In addition to her authored works, Craig has contributed writing to several collaborative publications, including How You Can Save the Planet, Wildlings, Fantastic Beasts: The Wonder of Nature, For the Love of Trees, Food for Thought, and The Most Important Comic Book on Earth. Her work and environmental advocacy have also been featured in publications including Rebel Girls Climate Warriors, Saving Birdgirl, and Know Bristol.

== Media appearances ==
Craig has appeared widely across British and international media discussing conservation, birding, climate activism, and racial diversity in environmental spaces.

In 2025, she co-hosted and mentored actor Sean Bean on the Get Birding podcast series.

She has appeared at Letters Live and has participated in film press events, including promotional appearances connected with Pixar's Hoopers.

== Awards and recognitions ==
In 2018, Craig won the National Biodiversity Network's Gilbert White Youth Award for recording terrestrial and freshwater wildlife.

In February 2020, Craig received an honorary doctorate in science (DSc hc) from the University of Bristol. She featured on the BBC Woman's Hour Power List of "women protecting our planet".

For International Women's Day 2022, Craig featured on the Evening Standard list of "London women changing the world".

In June 2023, Craig was awarded The Muslim News's Malcolm X Young Person's Award for Excellence. That year, she was also selected as a National Geographic Society Young Explorer.

Craig's first book, We Have a Dream, was nominated for Discover Book of the Year at the British Book Awards 2022. In March 2023, she was longlisted for the 2023 Jhalak Prize for her memoir, Birdgirl, which was also longlisted for the 2023 James Cropper Wainwright Prize. The book was a winner of the 2023 Somerset Maugham Award. Her third book, Flight, won the 2024 Edward Stanford Children's Travel Book of the Year.

Craig won the Malcolm X Award for Excellency awarded by the Muslim News 2023. Her first book, We Have A Dream was nominated for Discover Book of the Year at the British Book Awards 2022. In March 2023, Her second book, Birdgirl, was Longlisted for the Jhalak Prize, was a winner of the Somerset Maugham Award 2023. Her third book Flight has been nominated for the 2023 Yoto Carnegie Medal for Illustration and won the Edward Stanford Children's Travel Book of the Year 2024.

== Personal life ==
Craig has spoken publicly about her family's experience with bipolar disorder and mental health advocacy, particularly through her memoir Birdgirl. She has cited these experiences as central to shaping both her environmental work and broader public advocacy.

== Bibliography ==
- Craig, Mya-Rose (January 2021). We Have a Dream. Magic Cat Publishing. ISBN 978-1-913520-20-5
- Craig, Mya-Rose (June 2022). Birdgirl: Looking to the Skies in Search of a Better Future. Penguin Random House. ISBN 978-1-78733-320-8
- Craig, Mya-Rose (June 2023). Flight. Puffin Books. ISBN 978-0-241-59792-7
