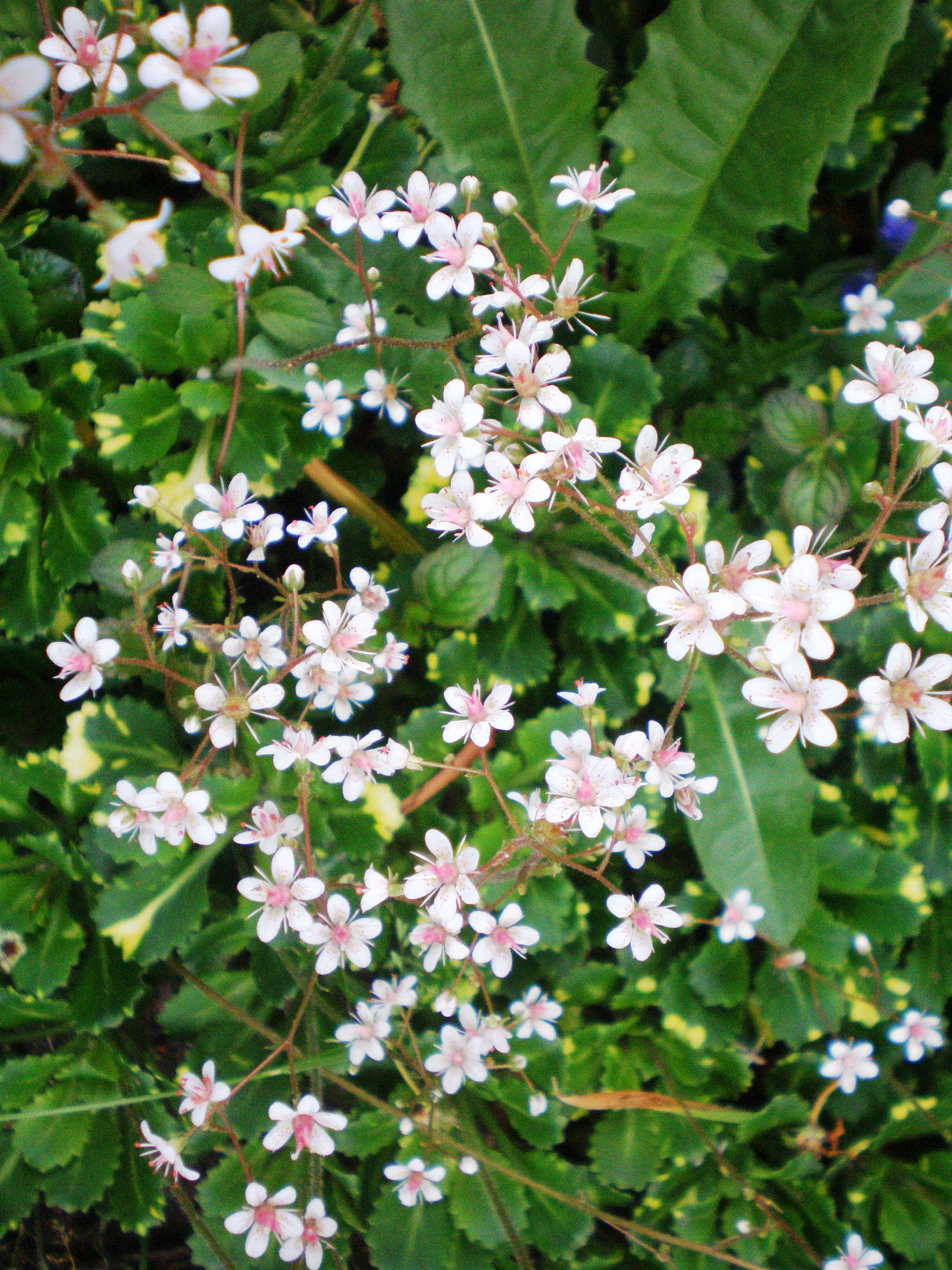

Scientific classification
- Kingdom: Plantae
- Clade: Tracheophytes
- Clade: Angiosperms
- Clade: Eudicots
- Order: Saxifragales
- Family: Saxifragaceae
- Genus: Saxifraga
- Species: S. × urbium

Binomial name
- Saxifraga × urbium D. A. Webb

= Saxifraga × urbium =

Saxifraga × urbium London Pride

Species of flowering plant

Saxifraga × urbium, London pride, is an evergreen perennial garden flowering plant. Alternative names for it include St. Patrick's cabbage, whimsey, prattling Parnell, and look up and kiss me. Before 1700, the “London pride” appellation was given to the Sweet William (Dianthus barbatus).

In 1846, Theresa Cornwallis West made a journey to Ireland. Near Dunloe in County Kerry "heareabouts grew quantities of our London Pride, and upon my expressing a wish for some roots to carry home, Sullivan [the driver] sprang down and tore up a large tuft. 'Ah, then,' said [our guide Spillane], 'that's too much entirely; why wouldn't ye leave some for the next comer?'" (A Summer Visit to the West of Ireland in 1846, p. 99).

== Taxonomy ==
The true London pride is a hybrid between Saxifraga umbrosa, native to the Spanish Pyrenees, and Saxifraga spathularis (the plant to which the name St Patrick's cabbage more correctly belongs, from western Ireland). The hybrid has been known at least since the 17th century.

The name is sometimes applied to any of several closely related plants of the saxifrage genus. The section Gymnopera is collectively referred to as "London Pride saxifrages", and others of them have "London pride" in their common names, for example the lesser London pride, S. cuneifolia, and the miniature London pride, S. umbrosa var. primuloides.

== Description ==
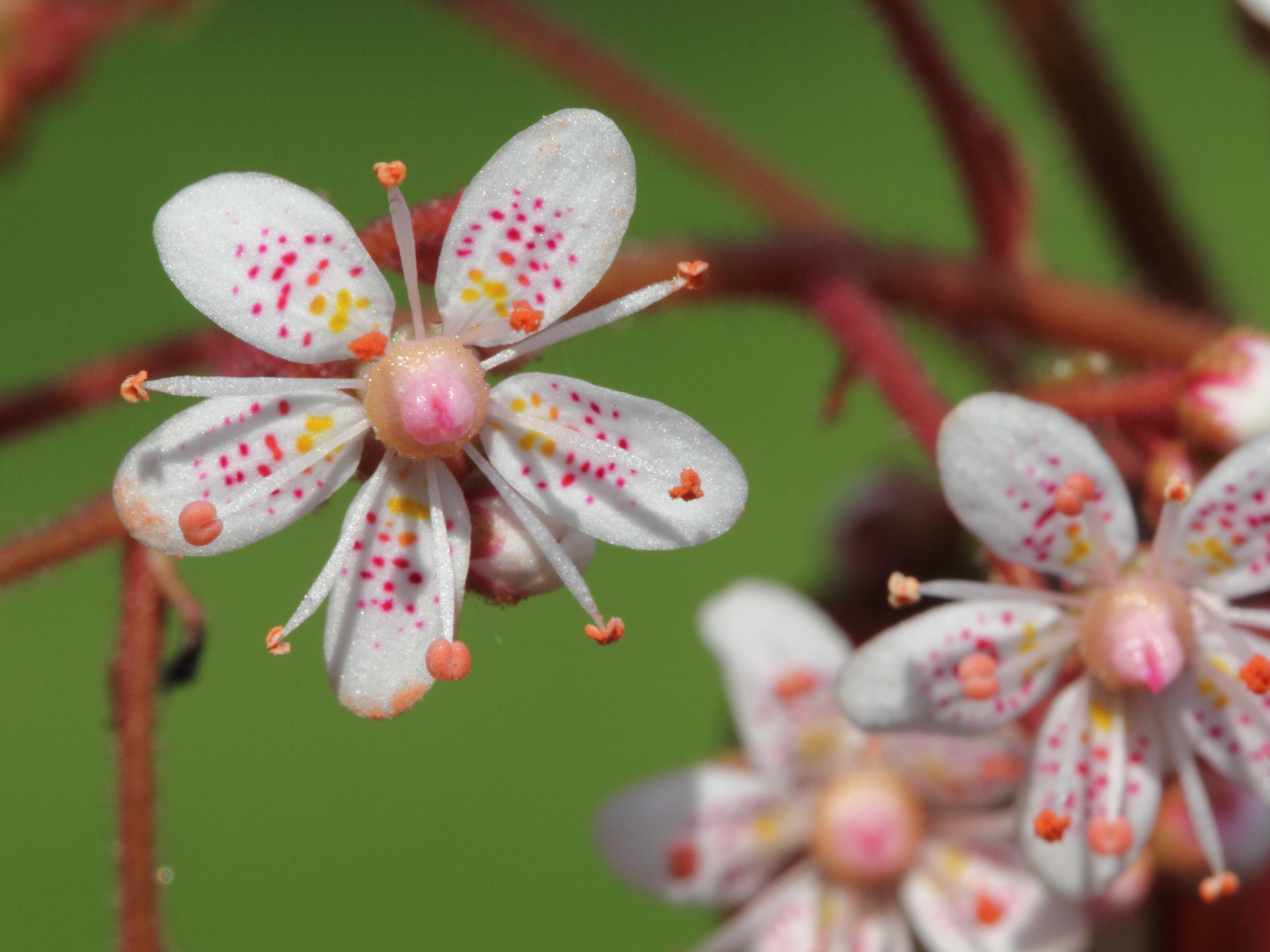
Close-up of blossom

London pride is tolerant of dry, shady conditions. It grows to a height of 15–30 cm (6–12 in) and provides rapid ground cover without being aggressively invasive, and in late spring produces a mass of small pale pink rosette flowers growing from succulent stems. It will grow well in neglected or unfavourable urban spaces where few other flowers flourish, and is a common garden escapee.

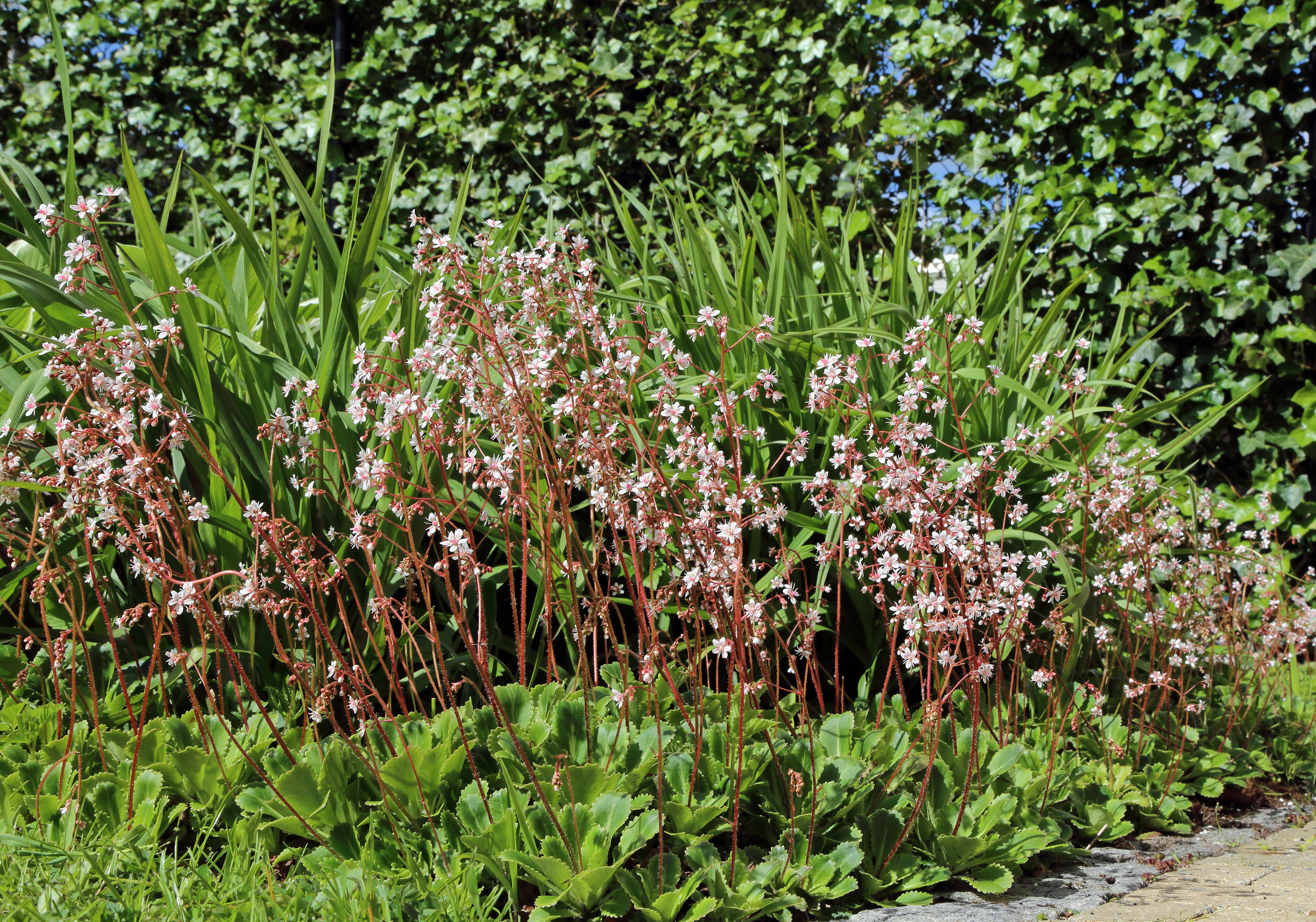
London pride planted in a garden

This plant has gained the Royal Horticultural Society's Award of Garden Merit.

== Symbolism ==
Bishop Walsham How (1823–1897) wrote a poem to the flower rebuking it for having the sin of pride. When told the flower had the name because Londoners were proud of it, he wrote another poem apologising to it.

Tradition holds that Saxifraga × urbium rapidly colonised the bombed sites left by the London Blitz of the early 1940s. As such it is symbolic of the resilience of London and ordinary Londoners, and of the futility of seeking to bomb them into submission. A song by Noël Coward, celebrating London and the flower, achieved great popularity during the World War II years.

In the language of flowers, London Pride is held to stand for frivolity, and its day is 27 July.
