= Mr. Fox (novel) =

2011 novel by British author Helen Oyeyemi

- Front edition (UK & US)
- Author: Helen Oyeyemi
- Language: English
- Genre: Novel
- Publisher: Picador (imprint) (UK); Riverhead Books (US)
- Publication date: 2011
- Publication place: Britain
- Media type: Paperback
- Pages: 336
- ISBN: 9781594486180

Mr. Fox is a 2011 novel by British author Helen Oyeyemi, published by Picador in the UK and by Riverhead Books in the US.

In an interview with Bookforum, Oyeyemi talked about Mr. Fox's relationship to her other work, saying: "Then there are the books that are like games. Mr. Fox and What Is Not Yours Is Not Yours fit in there. And I think those are the ones that I love—the ones I think are useless and not contributing anything. Because of that desire to be happy, and that desire to play, but also, they feel like my own, and not just projects."

== Plot ==
The main character of the book, Mr. Fox, is a beloved writer with a tendency towards killing the heroines in his novels in a gratuitous manner. He relies on an imaginary muse, 'Mary', to challenge his habit towards the female characters in his novels. The book largely consists of a 'game' between the fictive Mary and Mr. Fox, and the suspicions of Mr. Fox's wife, Daphne, who inserts herself into the game between Mary and Mr. Fox.

== Reception ==
The Guardian wrote "Oyeyemi breathes life into ideas like nobody else." From a review in NPR: "Oyeyemi exuberantly opens doors into other realms, minds and eras — and uncovers beautiful truths at every twisted turn."

Anita Sethi, writing in The Observer, called the novel "a meditation on the writing process itself, filled vignettes about how language may ensnare or liberate."

Aimee Bender, writing in The New York Times, wrote "Oyeyemi casts her word-spell, sentence by sentence, story by story, and by the end, the oppressive lair has opened up into a shimmering landscape pulsing with life."

In a mixed review, The Washington Post concluded that Mr. Fox displayed Oyeyemi's unwillingness to make the story "cohere."
