= Birdgirl (book) =

2022 book by Mya-Rose Craig

- Author: Mya-Rose Craig
- Subject: Autobiography, ornithology, environmental activism
- Published: 2022
- Publisher: Jonathan Cape
- Publication place: United Kingdom
- Media type: Memoir
- Pages: 320
- Awards: Somerset Maugham Prize
- ISBN: 1473589940

Birdgirl: Looking to the Skies in Search of a Better Future is a 2022 memoir by British ornithologist, environmentalist, activist, and author Mya-Rose Craig.

== Premise ==
Birdgirl chronicles the childhood and adolescence of British-Bangladeshi ornithologist and environmental activist Mya-Rose Craig, detailing her experiences traveling the world in pursuit of birds. The memoir opens with her parents' meeting in a Bristol club: her father, Chris, a birdwatcher, and her mother, Helena, a lawyer from a strict Bangladeshi Muslim family. Craig shares how her family used travel to cope with her mother's mood swings, embarking on birding trips across all seven continents before she turned 15.

The narrative explores the impact of her mother's mental illness on family dynamics and Craig's commitment to environmental advocacy. Each chapter begins with a bird sketch and profile that resonates with the chapter's theme. She also discusses founding the charity Black2Nature to enhance outdoor access for underrepresented communities and provides insights into endangered species and conservation efforts, along with a primer on birdwatching techniques.

The book has been described as a "memoir, which doubles as a travelog" and as "part memoir, part travelogue, part homage to the bird kingdom" by The Independent''.

== Critical reception ==
Birdgirl has been described as "covering a lot of ground," ranging from Craig's environmental activism to her mother's bipolar disorder. In her review of the book, The Guardian's Natasha Walter notes Craig's decision to publish a memoir at a young age and acknowledges her passion for birdwatching and environmental activism.

Canadian environmentalist and literary critic Margaret Atwood described Birdgirl as “lyrical, poignant and insightful." Audubon noted that the memoir is "imbued with lessons in how birding can help form community, provide mental relief" and that "while the book ties Craig's life story to her activist awakening, it's equally compelling in its focus on the tensions of growing up with a parent coping with mental illness." Time named the book one of the 23 most anticipated releases of 2023 in the United States, and noted that "the astuteness with which the author writes about her early life will reassure readers that our future is in good hands." The book ultimately became a bestseller.

A review of Birdgirl in Library Journal stated, "This is Jeannette Walls's The Glass Castle meets Neil Hayward's Lost Among the Birds, and it will likely generate strong millennial appeal as well." In a starred review, Booklist praised the book as a "forthright and compelling chronicle by a remarkable birder, environmentalist, and advocate," and recommended it for young adult readers. Kirkus Reviews lauded it as "an excellent mix of travelogue, memoir, and advocacy." Publishers Weekly asserted that the book would inspire nature-minded readers.

== Awards and recognitions ==
In March 2023, the book was longlisted for the 2023 Jhalak Prize. It was also longlisted for the 2023 James Cropper Wainwright Prize.

Birdgirl was selected as a 2023 winner of the Somerset Maugham Award. Prize judge Fred D'Aguiar noted its blend of global and local perspectives, and how the nature writing intersects with culture and politics. He highlighted the nuanced exploration of her mother's mental illness, concluding, "Birdgirl elevates our thinking about how a plural approach to a planetary problem may well yield remedies for a more secure future."

Birdgirl was included in Booklist's lists of the Top 10 Memoirs for 2023, as well as the Editors' Choice for Adult Books for Young Adults and Adult Books in 2023.
