= Duncan McLean (writer) =

Scottish novelist, short story writer, playwright, and editor

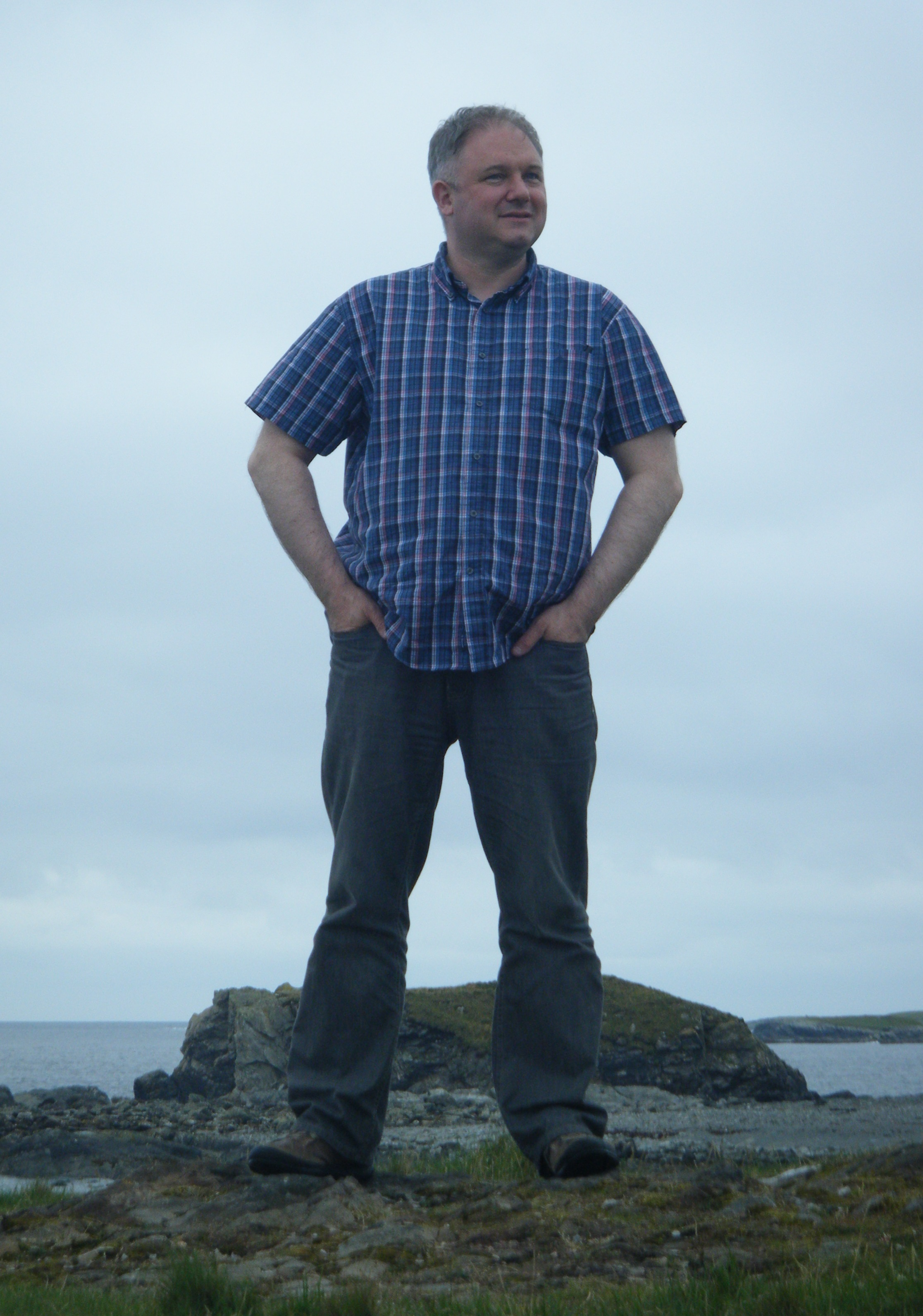
Duncan McLean, Inishbofin, 2010

Duncan McLean (born 1964) is a Scottish novelist, short story writer, playwright, and editor.

== Life and works ==
Duncan McLean was born in 1964 in Fraserburgh and has lived in Orkney since 1992. While based in Edinburgh in the 1980s, he started writing songs, stand-up routines, and plays for the Merry Mac Fun Co, a street theatre and comedy act with agitprop tendencies. The Merry Macs won various awards, and were twice nominated for the Perrier Comedy Award.

In the 1990s, McLean was part of a loose grouping of writers centred on Edinburgh whose characters were mainly poor, working class and young, whose themes were drugs, drink, dance music, violence, and alienation, and who took their inspiration variously from the Glaswegian writers of the previous generation, notably James Kelman, and from overseas writers like Richard Brautigan and Knut Hamsun. Among the so-called "Beats of Edinburgh", besides McLean, were Irvine Welsh, Alan Warner, Laura Hird and Gordon Legge, along with the publisher Kevin Williamson.

In December 1990, with the writer James Meek, McLean set up and ran the Clocktower Press, a small but influential publishing house, which helped bring a new generation of Scottish writers to wider attention. McLean, Meek and the artist Eddie Farrell invested £50 each to print the first booklet, Safe/Lurch, with both writers contributing a story and Farrell illustrating the cover. After the first three booklets, Meek moved to Kiev and McLean went on to publish seven more, including the first separately-published extracts of what would later become Irvine Welsh's Trainspotting. The fifth of the Clocktower series, it was printed in April 1992 in an edition of 300 under the title Past Tense: four stories from a novel.

In 1992, McLean published his first book, a collection of short stories called Bucket of Tongues, and since then has published several more books, including the acclaimed coming-of-age novel Blackden and a collection of plays, entitled Plays:One. In 1995, he published the novel Bunker Man and in 1997 his travelogue Lone Star Swing was published, which saw McLean tracing the roots of country music precursor Bob Wills.

In recent years, he has divided his time between writing, music, and running an off-license. In 2006, he won the prestigious trade award, UK Restaurant Wine Supplier of the Year, and ten years later, a major New Zealand Wine merchant award. In 2007, he founded the annual Orkney Wine Festival, the only event of its kind in Scotland. He writes a monthly column, 'Northabout', for The Wine Merchant magazine.

A new series of theatre pieces began with a translation of Aalst, a Belgian play by Pol Heyvaert, which toured the UK and Australia for the National Theatre of Scotland in 2007. McLean leads a western swing band called the Lone Star Swing band, which in 2009 and 2010 toured Scotland and Ireland in a new McLean play, 'Long Gone Lonesome.' With a slightly different cast, the play toured five US states in 2012. Telling the story of the reclusive Shetland musician Thomas Fraser, the play was produced by the National Theatre of Scotland, and directed by Vicky Featherstone. 'Long Gone Lonesome' was featured in the BBC TV documentary, 'National Theatre of Scotland: A Dramatic Decade' broadcast in September 2016.

The 2015 St Magnus Festival staged a new play, 'Telling the Truth Beautifully: The Trial of James Kirkness' - a story of gin smuggling and political change in 19th century Kirkwall.

In November 2015, McLean launched a new lo-fi imprint, the Abersee Press, with a booklet of contemporary Orkney-language writing by eight poets and story writers, including Harry Giles and Alison Miller. Abersee's professed goal is to kick-start a new wave of north-isles writing, as the Clocktower Press did for Edinburgh in the 1990s. A second anthology was published in May 2017; titled Speak For Yourself, it featured three New Zealand writers - CK Stead, Hera Lindsay Bird and Craig Marriner - as well as three Orkney writers. An introduction by McLean speaks of the legacy of pioneering New Zealand writer Frank Sargeson and his role as an inspiration for writers from outlying communities. He has also written about Sargeson for the London Review of Books.

In 2017 and 2018, three further Abersee Press publications appeared, 'Swiet Haar,' an anthology of three Orcadian and three Shetland writers, including Amy Liptrot and Christine de Luca, 'Dark Island,' a booklet of short stories by McLean, and 'Turangawaewae, Beuy' a second collection of writing by Orcadians and New Zealanders including Paula Morris and Steve Braunias. Further booklets have followed.

In 2020 and 2021, McLean co-edited (with Brian Hamill) two books in Glasgow publisher The Common Breath's short-lived Classics series. His introductions shed new light on significant but forgotten writers from literary history.

McLean's adaptation of Robert Louis Stevenson's Treasure Island was staged as the Christmas show at the Lyceum Theatre, Edinburgh, from 28 November 2024 to 4 January 2025.

He writes a weekly column for The Orcadian newspaper.

== List of works ==
=== Short stories ===
- 1992 - Bucket of Tongues (Secker & Warburg)
- 2017 - Dark Island (Abersee Press)

=== Novels ===
- 1994 Blackden (Secker & Warburg)
- 1995 Bunker Man (Jonathan Cape)

=== Drama ===
- 1999 Plays 1: Julie Allardyce, Blackden, Rug Comes to Shuv, One Sure Thing, I'd Rather Go Blind (Methuen)
- 2007 Aalst (National Theatre of Scotland/Methuen)
- 2009 Lone Gone Lonesome: The Thomas Fraser Story (National Theatre of Scotland)
- 2015 Telling the Truth Beautifully: The Trial of James Kirkness (St Magnus Festival)
- 2024 Treasure Island, adaptation of the novel by Robert Louis Stevenson, Royal Lyceum Theatre, Edinburgh

=== Film adaptations ===
- 1992 The Doubles (Tom Tyrant, BBC)
- 1997 Quality Control (Hannah Lewis, Channel 4)

=== Non-fiction ===
- 1997 Lone Star Swing: On the Trail of Bob Wills and His Texas Playboys (Jonathan Cape)

=== As editor ===
- 1997 Ahead of Its Time (Jonathan Cape)
- 2015 Orkney Stoor (Abersee Press)
- 2017 Speak For Yourself (Abersee Press)
- 2017 Swiet Haar (Abersee Press)
- 2018 Turangawaewae, Beuy (Abersee Press)
- 2020 Toonie Void (Abersee Press)
- 2020 Waiting for Nothing by Tom Kromer (The Common Breath)
- 2021 All to Blazes: Selected Stories of Frank Sargeson (The Common Breath)
- 2022 Rammo in Stenness (Abersee Press)
- 2022 Gallows Ha (Abersee Press, co-edited with Alison Miller)

== Literary Awards ==
- 1993 Somerset Maugham award
- 1998 Scottish Arts Council Book Award
