= 1975 in literature =

This article contains information about the literary events and publications of 1975.

== Events ==
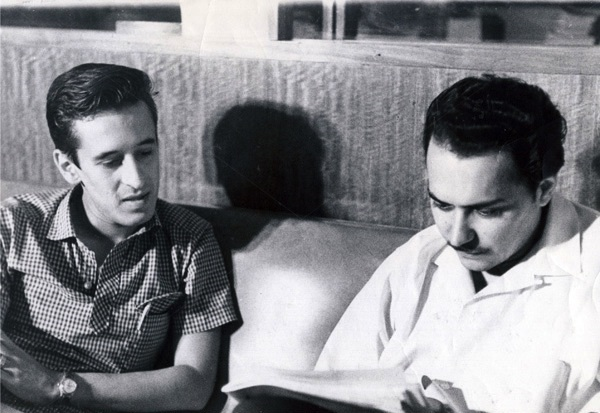
Roque Dalton and Cuban Fayad Jamís, in the newsroom of the newspaper Hoy in 1962.

- January 1 – English-born comic writer P. G. Wodehouse is awarded a knighthood, six weeks before he dies in the United States.
- January – Colin Dexter's detective novel Last Bus to Woodstock introduces his Oxford police officer, Inspector Morse.
- April 23
  - Barbara Pym and Philip Larkin meet in person for the first time, at the Randolph Hotel, Oxford, after years of correspondence.
  - Harold Pinter's play No Man's Land is premièred by the National Theatre at The Old Vic in London, directed by Peter Hall and starring Sir John Gielgud and Sir Ralph Richardson.
- April 28 – Harold Pinter leaves his first wife, the actress Vivien Merchant, having begun an affair with the married biographer Lady Antonia Fraser on January 8.
- May 10 – Leftist Salvadoran poet, journalist and political activist Roque Dalton (born 1935) is assassinated by former colleagues in the People's Revolutionary Army (ERP). At the time, the ERP, was torn by a bitter factional fight. Dalton criticized the organization for its military adventurism and its perceived failure to build a mass base. Dalton himself was accused of complicity with the Central Intelligence Agency (CIA) and assassinated by members of a rival faction within the ERP.
- August 12 – As the 20-year time limit stipulated by Thomas Mann at his death expires, sealed packets of 32 of the author's notebooks are opened in Zürich, Switzerland.
- unknown dates
  - Writing as Émile Ajar, the author Romain Gary becomes the only person to win the Prix Goncourt twice.
  - Radical Australian poet Dorothy Hewett publishes her collection Rapunzel in Suburbia, triggering a successful libel action by her ex-husband.
  - Hearing Secret Harmonies, the twelfth and final novel in the A Dance to the Music of Time series begun in 1951 by Anthony Powell, is published.
  - The French critic Hélène Cixous coins the term Écriture féminine in an article, "Le Rire de la méduse".
  - Milan Kundera emigrates from Czechoslovakia to France, to take up an academic position at the University of Rennes.
  - The Petrarca-Preis is founded by Hubert Burda.

== New books ==
=== Fiction ===
- Chabua Amirejibi – Data Tutashkhia
- Edward Abbey – The Monkey Wrench Gang
- Dritëro Agolli – Njeriu me top (The Man with the Cannon)
- Martin Amis – Dead Babies
- Natalie Babbitt – Tuck Everlasting
- J. G. Ballard – High-Rise
- Donald Barthelme – The Dead Father
- Saul Bellow – Humboldt's Gift
- Thomas Bernhard – Correction (Korrektur)
- Jorge Luis Borges – The Book of Sand (El libro de arena, short stories)
- Malcolm Bradbury – The History Man
- John Braine – The Pious Agent
- Charles Bukowski – Factotum
- Morley Callaghan – A Fine and Private Place
- J. L. Carr – How Steeple Sinderby Wanderers Won the F.A. Cup
- Agatha Christie – Curtain: Poirot's last case (written in 1940s)
- James Clavell – Shōgun
- Michael Crichton – The Great Train Robbery
- A. J. Cronin – The Minstrel Boy
- Robertson Davies – World of Wonders
- L. Sprague de Camp and Fletcher Pratt – The Compleat Enchanter
- Samuel R. Delany – Dhalgren
- Michel Déon – The Foundling Boy (Le Jeune Homme vert)
- August Derleth – Harrigan's File
- Guram Dochanashvili – The First Garment
- E. L. Doctorow – Ragtime
- Max Frisch – Montauk
- Carlos Fuentes – Terra Nostra
- William Gaddis – J R
- Gabriel García Márquez – The Autumn of the Patriarch (El Otoño del Patriarca)
- Romain Gary as Émile Ajar – The Life Before Us (La vie devant soi)
- Jon Godden – Ahmed and the Old Lady
- Rumer Godden – The Peacock Spring
- Arthur Hailey – The Moneychangers
- Peter Handke – A Moment of True Feeling (Die Stunde der wahren Empfindung)
- Thomas Harris – Black Sunday
- Xavier Herbert – Poor Fellow My Country
- Georgette Heyer – My Lord John
- Jack Higgins – The Eagle Has Landed
- Ruth Prawer Jhabvala – Heat and Dust
- B. S. Johnson – See the Old Lady Decently
- Gayl Jones – Corregidora
- Stephen King – Salem's Lot
- Sheridan Le Fanu (died 1873) – The Purcell Papers
- Derek Lambert – Touch the Lion's Paw
- David Lodge – Changing Places
- Robert Ludlum – The Road to Gandolfo
- John D. MacDonald – The Dreadful Lemon Sky
- Bharati Mukherjee – Wife
- Abdul Rahman Munif – East of the Mediterranean
- Gary Myers – The House of the Worm
- V. S. Naipaul – Guerrillas
- N. Richard Nash - Cry Macho
- Tim O'Brien – Northern Lights
- Gerald W. Page, editor – Nameless Places
- Robert B. Parker – Mortal Stakes
- Georges Perec – W, or the Memory of Childhood (W, ou le Souvenir d'enfance)
- Elizabeth Peters – Crocodile on the Sandbank (first in the Amelia Peabody series)
- Baltasar Porcel – Horses into the Night (Cavalls cap a la fosca)
- Anthony Powell – Hearing Secret Harmonies
- James Purdy – In a Shallow Grave
- Judith Rossner – Looking for Mr. Goodbar
- Joanna Russ – The Female Man
- Nawal El Saadawi – Woman at Point Zero (Emra'a Enda Noktat el Sifr)
- James Salter – Light Years
- Paul Scott – A Division of the Spoils
- Anya Seton – Smouldering Fires
- Gerald Seymour – Harry's Game
- Tom Sharpe – Blott on the Landscape
- Robert Shea and Robert Anton Wilson – The Illuminatus! Trilogy (individual editions)
- M. P. Shiel – Xélucha and Others
- Rex Stout – A Family Affair
- Glendon Swarthout – The Shootist
- Julian Symons – A Three-Pipe Problem
- Joseph Wambaugh – The Choirboys
- Keith Waterhouse – Billy Liar on the Moon
- Jack Vance – Showboat World
- Georgi Vladimov – Faithful Ruslan: The Story of a Guard Dog («Верный Руслан. История караульной собаки», first trade publication)
- Roger Zelazny – Sign of the Unicorn

=== Children and young people ===
- Verna Aardema (with Leo and Diane Dillon) – Why Mosquitoes Buzz in People's Ears
- Nina Bawden – The Peppermint Pig
- Susan Cooper – The Grey King
- Roald Dahl – Danny, the Champion of the World
- Tomie dePaola - Strega Nona
- Rumer Godden – Mr. McFadden's Hallowe'en
- Peter Härtling – Oma (Grandma)
- Eva Ibbotson – The Great Ghost Rescue
- E. L. Konigsburg - The Second Mrs. Gioconda
- Ronald McCuaig – Fresi Fantastika (Norwegian translation of Gangles)
- Ruth Park – The Muddle-Headed Wombat and the Invention
- Robert Westall – The Machine Gunners
- Mercer Mayer – Just for You (first in the Little Critter series)

=== Drama ===
- Alan Ayckbourn – Bedroom Farce
- Thomas Bernhard – Der Präsident
- Patrick Galvin – We Do It For Love
- Trevor Griffiths – Comedians
- Christopher Hampton – Treats
- David Hare
  - Fanshen
  - Teeth 'n' Smiles
- Colin Higgins and Denis Cannan with Peter Brook – The Ik
- Franz Xaver Kroetz
  - Geisterbahn (Ghost Train)
  - Das Nest (The Nest)
- Tom Murphy – The Sanctuary Lamp
- Stewart Parker – Spokesong
- Harold Pinter – No Man's Land
- Wole Soyinka – Death and the King's Horseman
- Ben Travers – The Bed Before Yesterday
- Charles Wood – Jingo

=== Poetry ===
- Lin Carter – Dreams from R'lyeh
- Leslie Norris – Mountains, Polecats, Pheasants and other Elegies

=== Non-fiction ===
- Philip Agee – Inside the Company: CIA Diary
- Kingsley Amis – Rudyard Kipling and His World
- Robert Bresson – Notes on the Cinematographer (Notes sur le cinématographe)
- Jacob Bronowski – The Ascent of Man
- Mary Chamberlain – Fenwomen: a portrait of women in an English village
- L. Sprague de Camp
  - Blond Barbarians and Noble Savages
  - Lovecraft: A Biography
  - The Miscast Barbarian: a Biography of Robert E. Howard
- S. M. Dubey – Social Mobility Among the Professions
- Michel Foucault – Discipline and Punish: The Birth of the Prison (Surveiller et punir: Naissance de la prison)
- Paul Fussell – The Great War and Modern Memory
- Paul Horgan – Lamy of Santa Fe
- Frank Belknap Long – Howard Phillips Lovecraft: Dreamer on the Nightside
- Philip Roth – Reading Myself and Others
- Peter Singer – Animal Liberation
- Paul Theroux – The Great Railway Bazaar

== Births ==
- January 13 – Daniel Kehlmann, German novelist
- February 25 – Carrie Mac, Canadian young-adult fiction writer
- February 27 – Cynan Jones, Welsh novelist
- April 6 - Leigh Bardugo, American fantasy writer
- April 11 – Walid Soliman, Tunisian author and translator
- June 23
  - Hugh Howey, American science-fiction writer
  - Markus Zusak, Australian young-adult novelist
- July 3 - Matt Haig, American speculative fiction writer
- July 19 – Martina Montelius, Swedish playwright
- August 20 – Matthew and Michael Dickman, American poets
- October 13 - Robin Parrish, American speculative fiction writer
- October 27 – Zadie Smith (Sadie Smith), English novelist
- December 19 – Brandon Sanderson, American fiction writer
- unknown dates
  - Gavin Francis, Scottish medical writer and physician
  - Shehan Karunatilaka, Sri Lankan English-language novelist

== Deaths ==
- January 15 – Sydney Goodsir Smith, Scottish poet, dramatist and novelist (heart attack; born 1915)
- February 14
  - Sir Julian Huxley, English biologist and author (born 1887)
  - Sir P. G. Wodehouse, English-born comic novelist (born 1881)
- February 20 – Ivan Sokolov-Mikitov, Russian author (born 1882)
- March 3 – T. H. Parry-Williams, Welsh poet (born 1887)
- March 7 – Kate Seredy, Hungarian-born American children's writer and illustrator (born 1899)
- March 13 – Ivo Andrić, Yugoslav novelist and Nobel laureate (born 1892)
- April 23 – Rolf Dieter Brinkmann, German poet (killed in hit-and-run-accident in London, born 1940)
- May 21 – A. H. Dodd, Welsh historian (born 1891)
- June 8 – Murray Leinster (William Fitzgerald Jenkins), American science fiction writer (born 1896)
- July 2 – Audrey Maas, American novelist and television writer (born 1934)
- July 10 – Peter Frederick Anson, English writer on religion and maritime matters (born 1889)
- September 20 – Saint-John Perse (Alexis Leger), French poet and Nobel laureate (born 1887)
- October 5 – Lady Constance Malleson, Irish actress and writer (born 1895)
- October 22 – Arnold J. Toynbee, English historian (born 1889)
- November 13 – R. C. Sherriff, English dramatist and novelist (born 1896)
- November 19 – Elizabeth Taylor, English novelist (cancer; born 1912)
- November 25 – Edward Hyams, English historian and novelist (born 1910)
- November 27 – Ross McWhirter, English sports journalist and joint compiler of Guinness Book of Records (assassinated, born 1925)
- December 4 – Hannah Arendt, German-American philosopher (born 1906)
- December 7 – Thornton Wilder, American novelist and dramatist (born 1897)

== Awards ==
- Nobel Prize for Literature: Eugenio Montale

=== Canada ===
- See 1975 Governor General's Awards for a complete list of winners and finalists for those awards.

=== France ===
- Prix Goncourt: Romain Gary as Emile Ajar – La vie devant soi
- Prix Médicis:
  - French: Jacques Almira, Le Voyage à Naucratis
  - International: Steven Millhauser, La Vie trop brève d'Edwin Mulhouse – United States

=== Spain ===
- Premio Nadal: Francisco Umbral, Las ninfas

=== United Kingdom ===
- Booker Prize: Ruth Prawer Jhabvala, Heat and Dust
- Carnegie Medal for children's literature: Robert Westall, The Machine Gunners
- Cholmondeley Award: Jenny Joseph, Norman MacCaig, John Ormond
- Duff Cooper Prize: Seamus Heaney, North
- Eric Gregory Award: John Birtwhistle, Duncan Bush, Val Warner, Philip Holmes, Peter Cash, Alasdair Paterson
- James Tait Black Memorial Prize:
  - Fiction: Brian Moore, The Great Victorian Collection
  - Biography: Karl Miller, Cockburn's Millennium

=== United States ===
- American Academy of Arts and Letters Gold Medal for Belles Lettres: Kenneth Burke
- Hugo Award for Best Novella: George R. R. Martin, A Song for Lya
- Nebula Award: Joe Haldeman, The Forever War
- Newbery Medal for children's literature: Virginia Hamilton, M. C. Higgins, the Great
- Newdigate Prize: Andrew Motion
- Pulitzer Prize:
  - Drama: Edward Albee, Seascape
  - Fiction: Michael Shaara, The Killer Angels
  - Poetry: Gary Snyder, Turtle Island

=== Elsewhere ===
- Friedenspreis des Deutschen Buchhandels: Alfred Grosser
- Miles Franklin Award: Xavier Herbert, Poor Fellow My Country
- Viareggio Prize: Paolo Volponi, Il sipario ducale

== Sources ==
- Beverley, John. “Poems: Roque Dalton, John Beverley, Edward Baker.” Social Text, No. 5 (Spring, 1982)
