= Outspoken Prize =

Outspoken Prize may refer to:

- Out-Spoken Prize for Poetry, award by Out-Spoken Press
- Outspoken Award, awarded by OutRight Action International, for advancing LGBTI rights
