= Peskett =

Peskett is a surname. Notable people with the surname include:

- Leonard Peskett (1861–1924), British naval designer and architect
- William Peskett (born 1952), Northern Irish poet
