= Tony Curtis (Welsh poet) =

Welsh poet

Tony Curtis FRSL (born 1946) is a Welsh poet who writes in English.

== Biography ==
Tony Curtis was born in 1946 in Carmarthen, and was educated at Swansea University. He subsequently studied for a MFA degree at Goddard College, Vermont. He taught English in secondary schools in Cheshire and Yorkshire before returning to Wales to a lecturing post. He introduced and developed Creative Writing at the Polytechnic of Wales and ran the M.Phil. In Writing when it became the University of Glamorgan. Tony Curtis's book debut was in Three Young Anglo-Welsh Poets (1974), published by the Welsh Arts Council, in which he featured together with Duncan Bush and Nigel Jenkins. Though in 1972 he had been included in the Phoenix Pamphlet Poets Series from Peterloo Press - Walk Down a Welsh Wind.

He was given a Gregory Award in 1972, won the National Poetry Competition in 1984 and was given the Dylan Thomas Award in 1993. Then in 1994 Curtis became Professor of Poetry at the University of Glamorgan. In 1997 he received a Cholmondeley Award. He established a Creative Writing course at the university, and developed a M.Phil. in Writing course there, which he ran for sixteen years. Tony Curtis was made a Fellow of the Royal Society of Literature in 2000, and in 2004 he was awarded the first D.Litt. by the University of Glamorgan. He is Emeritus Professor of Poetry at the University of South Wales (Glamorgan). In 2014, Dylan Thomas's centenary year, he toured a talk based on his memoir "My Life with Dylan Thomas". In September 2015 he visited the US with that talk and other poetry readings. From May 2015 he was visiting poet at Dyffryn House and Gardens in the Vale of Glamorgan. In that month he curated the first exhibition of Ceri Richards Dylan Thomas-inspired paintings at the Boathouse in Laugharne. In 2016 Seren Books published his From the Fortunate Isles: New & Selected Poems 1966-2016. Also, in 2016, in conjunction with the Welsh-language poet Grahame Davies, he wrote poems to commemorate the fifty-year anniversary of the Aberfan disaster. In 2017 Cinnamon Press published his selected Stories: Some Kind of Immortality. In 2023 his novel “Darkness in the City of Light” (2021) was short-listed for the Paul Torday Prize awarded by the Society of Authors. In 2024 his eleventh collection of poetry was published - Leaving the Hills.

Tony Curtis is currently writing a book on his art collection- A Private View, to be published in 2027.

A critical study on the poet will be published in 2027 in the University of Wales Press “Writers of Wales series, written by Professor Helen Phillips.

== Works ==
- Three Young Anglo-Welsh Poets: Duncan Bush, Tony Curtis, Nigel Jenkins (1974)
- Album (1974)
- Preparations (1980)
- The Art of Seamus Heaney (ed.) (1982)
- Letting Go (1983)
- Dannie Abse (1985) (Writers of Wales series)
- Selected Poems 1970-85 (1986)
- Poems Selected and New (USA 1996)
- The Last Candles (1989)
- The Poetry of Snowdonia, ed. (1989)
- The Poetry Of Pembrokeshire, ed. (1989)
- Love from Wales, ed. with Sian James (1991 and five reprints)
- Taken for Pearls (1993)
- War Voices (1995)
- Welsh Painters Talking (1997)
- Coal: an anthology of Mining, ed. (1997)
- The Arches (with artist John Digby) (1998)
- Welsh Artists Talking (2001)
- Heaven's Gate (2001)
- Crossing Over (2007)
- Following Petra (2008)
- The Meaning of Apricot Sponge - Selected Writing of John Tripp (2010)
- Real South Pembrokeshire (2011)
- "Common Sense" (2012) with Welsh poet Grahame Davies, Gigi Jones and Mervyn Burtch
- "Alchemy of Water/Alcemi Dwr" with Grahame Davies (2013)
- "My Life with Dylan Thomas" Mulfran Press (2014)
- "From the Fortunate Isles:New and Selected Poems 1966-2016" (Seren 2016)
- "Some Kind of Immortality: Selected Stories" Cinnamon Press, May 2017.

Darkness in the City of Light, Novel, Seren Books,2021.

Leaving the Hills, poetry collection, Seren Books, 2024.
