= Jon Stone (poet) =

British poet (born 1983)

- Born: 1983 (age 42–43); Derby, England
- Education: University of East Anglia
- Occupation: Poet
- Writing career
- Language: English
- Notable awards: Eric Gregory Award (2012)
- Website: www.gojonstonego.com

Jonathan T. Stone (born 1983 in Derby, England) is a British poet. He is the author of two books and several pamphlets of poetry, and also publishes work in the numerous collaborative poetry anthologies he has co-edited and published with Sidekick Books. Additionally, his poems have been published in The Sunday Times, Poetry Review, Poetry London and The Rialto (poetry magazine), among others.

He graduated with a BA in English Literature and Creative Writing from the University of East Anglia in 2004. He won an Eric Gregory Award in 2012.

In 2022, he published a peer-reviewed study of the interplay between poetry and video games, in which he coined the term ludokinetic poetry to describe poetry that "goes further than simply giving the reader the ability to physically manipulate the text or move through it multidirectionally [...] The intended effect is for the reader to become (and to recognise themselves as) a player of the poem, by making them—or rather, their ludic self—a feature of the text, operating it from within as well as from without". Along with his own work, his cited examples included works by Porpentine.

== Awards ==
- 2012 Eric Gregory Award
- 2014 Poetry London Prize
- 2015 Hawthornden Castle Fellowship
- 2016 Poetry London Prize
- 2018 Live Canon International Poetry Prize

== Bibliography ==
- I'll Show You Tyrants (2005)
- Scarecrows (2010)
- School of Forgery (2012)
- Riotous (with Kirsten Irving) (2013)
- Tomboys (2016)
- Unravelanche (2021)
- Sandsnarl (2021)
- Dual Wield: The Interplay of Poetry and Video Games (2022)
