= Rachel Dawson (disambiguation) =

Rachel Dawson (born 1985) is an American field hockey player.

Rachel Dawson may also refer to:

== People ==
- Rachel Dawson (author), Welsh author
- Rachel Dawson, episode writer for the British series Roary the Racing Car
- Rachel Dawson, stage actress in the 2015 Broadway musical Amélie
- Rachel Dawson, cellist on the 2015 album Abysmal

== Fictional characters ==
- Rachel Dawson, a character in Heartbeat, a British police procedural drama, played by Clare Wille
- Rachel Dawson, a character in the stage adaptation of The Girl on the Train, played by Louisa Lytton

== See also ==
- Search Wikipedia for "Rachel Dawson"
