= Eric Gregory Award =

Annual British poetry award

The Eric Gregory Award is a literary award given annually by the Society of Authors for a collection by United Kingdom poets under the age of 30. The award was founded in 1960 by Dr. Eric Gregory to support and encourage young poets.

== Past winners ==
- 1960: Christopher Levenson
- 1961: Adrian Mitchell, Geoffrey Hill
- 1962: Donald Thomas, James Simmons, Bryan Johnson, Jenny Joseph
- 1963: Ian Hamilton, Stewart Conn, Peter Griffith, David Wevill
- 1964: Robert Nye, Ken Smith, Jean Symons, Ted Walker
- 1965: John Fuller, Derek Mahon, Michael Longley, Norman Talbot
- 1966: Robin Fulton, Seamus Heaney, Hugo Williams
- 1967: Angus Calder, Marcus Cumberlege, David Harsent, David Selzer, Brian Patten
- 1968: James Aitchison, Douglas Dunn, Brian Jones
- 1969: Gavin Bantock, Jeremy Hooker, Jenny King, Neil Powell, Landeg E. White
- 1970: Helen Frye, Paul Mills, John Mole, Brian Morse, Alan Perry, Richard Tibbitts
- 1971: Martin Booth, Florence Bull, John Pook, D. M. Warman, John Welch
- 1972: Tony Curtis, Richard Berengarten, Brian Oxley, Andrew Greig, Robin Lee, Paul Muldoon
- 1973: John Beynon, Ian Caws, James Fenton, Keith Harris, David Howarth, Philip Pacey
- 1974: Duncan Forbes, Roger Garfitt, Robin Hamilton, Frank Ormsby, Penelope Shuttle
- 1975: John Birtwhistle, Duncan Bush, Val Warner, Philip Holmes, Peter Cash, Alasdair Paterson
- 1976: Stewart Brown, Valerie Gillies, Paul Groves, Paul Hyland, Nigel Jenkins, Andrew Motion, Tom Paulin, William Peskett
- 1977: Tony Flynn, Michael Vince, David Cooke, Douglas Marshall, Melissa Murray
- 1978: Ciaran Carson, Peter Denman, Christopher Reid, Paul Wilkins, Martyn A. Ford, James Sutherland-Smith
- 1979: Stuart Henson, Michael Jenkins, Alan Hollinghurst, Sean O'Brien, Peter Thabit Jones, James Lindesay, Walter Perrie, Brian Moses
- 1980: Robert Minhinnick, Michael Hulse, Blake Morrison, Medbh McGuckian
- 1981: Alan Jenkins, Simon Rae, Marion Lomax, Philip Gross, Kathleen Jamie, Mark Abley, Roger Crowley, Ian Gregson
- 1982: Steve Ellis, Jeremy Reed, Alison Brackenbury, Neil Astley, Chris O'Neill, Joseph Bristow, John Gibbens, James Lasdun
- 1983: Martin Stokes, Hilary Davies, Michael O'Neill, Lisa St Aubin De Teran, Deidre Shanahan
- 1984: Martyn Crucefix, Mick Imlah, Jamie McKendrick, Bill Smith, Carol Ann Duffy, Christopher Meredith, Peter Armstrong, Iain Bamforth
- 1985: Graham Mort, Adam Thorpe, Pippa Little, James Harpur, Simon North, Julian May
- 1986: Mick North, Lachlan Mackinnon, Oliver Reynolds, Stephen Romer
- 1987: Peter McDonald, Maura Dooley, Stephen Knight, Steve Anthony, Jill Maughan, Paul Munden
- 1988: Michael Symmons Roberts, Gwyneth Lewis, Adrian Blackledge, Simon Armitage, Robert Crawford
- 1989: Gerard Woodward, David Morley, Katrina Porteous, Paul Henry
- 1990: Nicholas Drake, Maggie Hannan, William Park, Jonathan Davidson, Lavinia Greenlaw, Don Paterson, John Wells
- 1991: Roddy Lumsden, Glyn Maxwell, Stephen Smith, Wayne Burrows, Jackie Kay
- 1992: Jill Dawson, Hugh Dunkerley, Chris Greenhalgh, Marita Maddah, Stuart Paterson, Stuart Pickford
- 1993: Eleanor Brown, Joel Lane, Deryn Rees-Jones, Sean Boustead, Tracey Herd, Angela McSeveney
- 1994: Julia Copus, Alice Oswald, Steven Blyth, Kate Clanchy, Giles Goodland
- 1995: Colette Bryce, Sophie Hannah, Tobias Hill, Mark Wormald
- 1996: Sue Butler, Cathy Cullis, Jane Griffiths, Jane Holland, Chris Jones, Sinéad Morrissey, Kate Thomas
- 1997: Matthew Clegg, Sarah Corbett, Polly Clark, Tim Kendall, Graham Nelson, Matthew Welton
- 1998: Mark Goodwin, Joanne Limburg, Patrick McGuinness, Kona Macphee, Esther Morgan, Christiania Whitehead, Frances Williams
- 1999: Ross Cogan, Matthew Hollis, Helen Ivory, Andrew Pidoux, Owen Sheers, Dan Wyke
- 2000: Eleanor Margolies, Antony Rowland, Antony Dunn, Karen Goodwin, Clare Pollard
- 2001: Leontia Flynn, Thomas Warner, Tishani Doshi, Patrick Mackie, Kathryn Gray, Sally Read
- 2002: Caroline Bird, Christopher James, Jacob Polley, Luke Heeley, Judith Lal, David Leonard Briggs, Eleanor Rees, Kathryn Simmonds
- 2003: Jen Hadfield, Zoë Brigley, Paul Batchelor, Olivia Cole, Sasha Dugdale, Anna Woodford
- 2004: Nick Laird, Elizabeth Manuel, Abi Curtis, Sophie Levy, Saradha Soobrayen
- 2005: Melanie Challenger, Carolyn Jess-Cooke, Luke Kennard Toby Martinez de las Rivas
- 2006: Fiona Benson, Retta Bowen, Frances Leviston, Jonathan Morley, Eoghan Walls
- 2007: Rachel Curzon, Miriam Gamble, Michael McKimm, Helen Mort, Jack Underwood
- 2008: Emily Berry, Rhiannon Hooson, James Midgley, Adam O'Riordan, Heather Phillipson
- 2009: Liz Berry, James Brookes, Swithun Cooper, Alex McRae, Sam Riviere
- 2010: Phil Brown, Matthew Gregory, Sarah Howe, Abigail Parry, Ahren Warner
- 2011: Niall Campbell, Tom Chivers, Holly Hopkins, Martin Jackson, Kim Moore
- 2012: Sophie Baker, Joey Connolly, Holly Corfield Carr, Caleb Klaces, Rachael Nicholas, Phoebe Power, Jon Stone
- 2013: John Clegg, Kate Gething-Smith, Matt Haw, Oli Hazzard
- 2014: Sophie Collins, Emily Hasler, Martha Sprackland, Chloe Stopa-Hunt, David Tait
- 2015: Rowan Evans, Miriam Nash, Padraig Regan, Stewart Sanderson, Andrew Wynn Owen
- 2016: Sam Buchan Watts, Dom Bury, Jen Campbell, Alex MacDonald, Andrew McMillan
- 2017: Rachael Allen, Isabel Galleymore, Daisy Lafarge, Richard O'Brien, Richard Osmond, Mark Pajak
- 2018: Zohar Atkins, Victoria Adukwei Bulley, Jenna Clake, Joseph Eastell, Annie Katchinska, Ali Lewis/Stephen Sexton
- 2019: James Conor Patterson, Sophie Collins, Mary Jean Chan, Dominic Leonard, Seán Hewitt, Phoebe Stuckes
- 2020: Susannah Dickey, Natalie Linh Bolderston, Roseanne Watt, Kadish Morris, Amina Jama
- 2021: Michael Askew, Dominic Hand, Cynthia Miller, Gboyega Odubanjo, Kandance Siobhan Walker, Phoebe Walker, Milena Williamson
- 2022: Stephanie Sy-Quia, Daniella Fearon, Jack Cooper, Maisie Newman, Courtney Conrad, Rhiya Pau, Joe Carrick-Varty
- 2023: Princess Arinola Adegbite, Jay Gao, Charlotte Shevchenko Knight, Mukahang Limbu, Momtaza Mehri, Helen Quah
- 2024: Will Barnard, Maia Elsner, William Gee, Yanita Georgieva, Nathaniel King, Francis-Xavier Mukiibi

== See also ==
- List of British literary awards
- British poetry
- List of poetry awards
- List of years in poetry
- List of years in literature
