= Michael Clanchy =

British historian (1936–2021)

Michael Thomas Clanchy (28 November 1936 – 29 January 2021) was a British medievalist who was Professor Emeritus of Medieval History at the Institute of Historical Research, University of London and Fellow of the British Academy.

== Early life and education ==
Clanchy was born in Reading, Berkshire, in 1936, the son of Henry, a Royal Navy captain from an Irish Catholic family, and Virginia, a New Zealander, and was educated at Ampleforth College. He went up to Oxford University to read history, matriculating at Merton College in 1956 and taking a second class degree three years later. After two years teaching at Presentation College, Reading, Clanchy returned to Merton in 1961, and was awarded his DipEd the following year.

== Career ==
Clanchy became a lecturer at the University of Glasgow in 1964, and was well known for his books, such as From Memory to Written Record (1979; revised and expanded editions 1993 and 2013: a study of the triumph of literacy in medieval England), England and its Rulers 1066–1272 (1983; revised editions 1998, 2006 and 2014), and Abelard: A Medieval Life (1997). His interests primarily lay in law and government in the 12th and 13th centuries. He was Patron of the London Medieval Society.

In 1985 Clanchy left Glasgow, and moved to London; he took up an honorary position at Westfield College and taught at University College London, whilst continuing his research independently. This led to the publication of Abelard: A Medieval Life in 1997, on the strength of which he was elected as a Fellow of the British Academy in 1999.

Clanchy appeared on In Our Time on BBC Radio 4, firstly in 2005 regarding Peter Abelard and Héloïse d'Argenteuil, and secondly discussing Magna Carta in May 2009. His work has been translated into a number of different languages, including French, German, Italian, and Norwegian.

== Personal life ==
In 1963 Clanchy married Joan Milne, whom he had met whilst at University; they had a daughter, Kate, and a son.

== Publications ==
- "The franchise of return of writs", Transactions of the Royal Historical Society, 5th ser., vol. 17 (1967)
- "Did Henry III have a policy?", History, vol. 53 (1968)
- Civil Pleas of the Wiltshire Eyre, 1249 (1971)
- The Roll and Writ File of the Berkshire Eyre of 1248, Selden Society, vol. 90 (1973)
- "Moderni in education and government in England", Speculum 58 (1975)
- From Memory to Written Record: England 1066–1307 (Oxford, 1979); 2nd ed. 1993; 3rd ed. 2013
- England and its Rulers, 1066–1272: Foreign Lordship and National Identity (London, 1983); 2nd ed. 1998; 3rd ed. 2006; 4th ed. 2014
- "Looking back to the invention of printing", in D. P. Resnick (ed.), Literacy in Historical Perspective (Library of Congress, D.C., 1983)
- Ranulf Glanvill, Tractatus de legibus et consuetudinibus regni Anglie qui Glanvilla vocatur, ed. and trans. G. Derek G. Hall with a guide to further reading by Michael T. Clanchy (Oxford, 1993)
- "Learning to Read in the Middle Ages and the Role of Mothers," in Studies in the History of Reading, ed. Greg Brooks and A. K. Pugh (Reading: Centre for Teaching of Reading, 1984), pp. 33–39.
- Abelard: A Medieval Life (1997)
- ed. Letters of Abelard and Heloise (2003)
- "Law and theology in twelfth-century England: the works of Master Vacarius (c.1115/1120–c.1200)", Disputatio, vol. 10 (2006)
- "Did mothers teach their children to read?", in Lesley Smith & Conrad Leyser (eds), Motherhood, Religion, and Society in Medieval Europe, 400–1400 (2011)
- "Was Abelard right to deny that he had written a Book of Sentences?" Part 2, Controversy and Exchange, in Rethinking Abelard: A Collection of Critical Essays (Brill's Studies in Intellectual History, 2014)

== See also ==
- A History of England
