= Duncan Forbes (poet) =

British poet (born 1947)

Duncan Forbes (born 1947) is a British poet.

He studied English at Corpus Christi College in Oxford. He works as a teacher.

== Works ==
His first poetry collection, August Autumn, was published in 1984 by Secker and Warburg. His four subsequent collections, Public and Confidential (1989), Taking Liberties (1993), Voice Mail (2002) and Vision Mixer (2006), were all published by Enitharmon Press. In 1994 The Bodley Head published Point The Finger. In 1974, Forbes received an Eric Gregory Award; in 1998, he won 1st Prize in the TLS / Blackwells Poetry Competition. He retired from head of English at Wycombe Abbey School in the summer of 2009.

== Sources ==
- Verse Daily: Duncan Forbes website
- Enitharmon Press website
- Society of Authors - Greogory Award Winners website
- Harvill Secker website
