= Oliver Reynolds =

British poet

Oliver Reynolds (born 1957, in Cardiff, Wales) is a British poet and critic. He studied drama at the University of Hull before returning to Wales to work as an assistant to the Director for Theatre Wales. He won the Arvon Foundation International Poetry Competition in 1985 for his poem 'Rorschach Writing' and the Eric Gregory Award in 1986. Reynolds has held writing residencies at universities in England, Scotland and Sweden, and has contributed to various literary publications including The Times Literary Supplement, Granta and The London Magazine.

== Bibliography ==
=== Poetry ===
Collections

- (1985) Skevington's Daughter (Faber and Faber)
- (1987) The Player Queen's Wife (Faber and Faber)
- (1991) The Oslo Tram (Faber and Faber)
- (1999) Almost (Faber and Faber)
- (2010) Hodge (Areté Books)
- (2018) Or (Areté Books)
