= Ian Gregson =

English poet

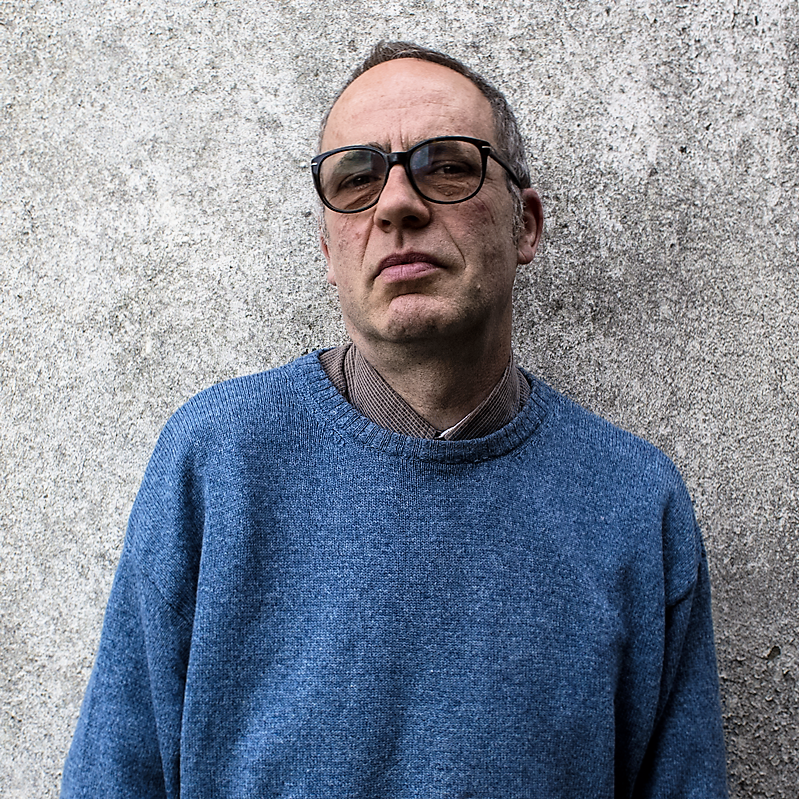
- Born: 1953 (age 72–73); Manchester, England
- Education: University of Oxford; University of Hull
- Occupation: Poet
- Writing career
- Language: English
- Period: 1981–
- Notable awards: Eric Gregory Award, 1981
- Website: www.iangregson.co.uk

Ian Gregson (born 1953) is an English novelist and poet. His debut poetry collection Call Centre Love Song was shortlisted for a Forward Prize in 2006. In 2015, he was put forward for the position of Professor of Poetry at Oxford University.

== Biography ==
Born in Manchester in 1953, Ian Gregson was educated at Oxford University and completed a PhD at the University of Hull. In 1981, he was given an Eric Gregory Award by the Society of Authors. His debut poetry collection Call Centre Love Song was published by Salt in 2006, and was shortlisted for a Forward Prize for 'Best First Collection'.

Gregson has lived most of his adult life in north Wales, where he was Professor of English literature and creative writing at Bangor University until taking early retirement in 2015. He has published a number of critical books, largely concerned with contemporary poetry, postmodernism and representations of masculinity. His second poetry collection, How We Met, was published by Salt in 2008. The poem 'Squawks and Speech' from How We Met was chosen as The Guardian's Poem of the Week in July 2014. Gregson has also written two novels, Not Tonight Neil (2011) and The Crocodile Princess (2015), both published by Cinnamon Press.

In 2015, Gregson was nominated for the position of Professor of Poetry. Gregson later urged his supporters to vote for Simon Armitage, who was appointed to the role in June 2015. Coincidentally, Gregson had previously written a book-length introduction to Armitage for those studying him at school and university, built around detailed and accessible readings of his most important poems.

Sixteen of his poems have been translated into Chinese by Peter Jingcheng Xu who is also a poet, translator and scholar, completing his PhD at the School of English Literature, Bangor University in 2018. The poems and the Chinese translations together with the translator's Chinese review titled 'Ian Gregson: A Contemporary British Postmodernist Eco-Poet of Dramatic Monologue' are published by installment in the key journal The World of English from May to September 2018.

== Books ==
=== Fiction ===
- 2011: Not Tonight Neil, Cinnamon Press
- 2015: The Crocodile Princess, Cinnamon Press

=== Poetry ===
- 2006: Call Centre Love Song, Salt
- 2008: How We Met, Salt
- 2020: The Slasher and the Vampire as Role Models, Cinnamon Press

=== Criticism ===
- 1996: Contemporary Poetry And Postmodernism: Dialogue And Estrangement, Palgrave Macmillan
- 1999: The Male Image: Representations of Masculinity in Postwar Poetry, Palgrave Macmillan
- 2004: Postmodern Literature, Bloomsbury
- 2006: Character and Satire in Postwar Fiction, Continuum
- 2007: The New Poetry in Wales, University of Wales Press
- 2011: Simon Armitage (Salt Studies in Contemporary Poetry), Salt

=== As editor ===
- 2010: Old City, New Rumours (ed. with Carol Rumens), Five Leaves
