= Steven Blyth =

British writer

Steven Blyth is a poet (born 1968 in Bolton) based in the Greater Manchester area. His poetry won an Eric Gregory Award in 1994. He was educated at the University of Bolton and University of Manchester.

Blyth's poetry is of a similar style to poets like Philip Larkin and Stanley Cook.

== Publications ==
- Baddy, Peterloo, 1997
- So, Peterloo, 2001
- Mr Right, Shoestring Press, 2011
- Both, Smokestack Press, 2012
