= Kathryn Gray =

Welsh poet

- Born: 1973 (age 52–53); Caerphilly, Wales
- Education: University of Bristol
- Occupations: Poet and writer
- Writing career
- Notable awards: Eric Gregory Award

Kathryn Gray is a Welsh poet.

== Biography ==
Kathryn Gray was born in Wales in 1973 and grew up in Swansea. She studied German and Medieval Studies at the University of Bristol and the University of York.

Gray's first poetry collection, The Never-Never, was published in 2004 by Seren Books. She was shortlisted for the T. S. Eliot Prize and the Forward Prize for best first collection for her work.

Gray published the poetry pamphlet, Flowers in 2017. Her work has appeared in several literary journals, including the Times Literary Supplement, the Independent, the Poetry Review and Poetry Wales. A second full collection, Hollywood or Home, was published by Seren Books in October 2023 and was a Sunday Times Poetry Book of the Year.

Gray has taught poetry at the Poetry School, London and the Arvon Foundation. She is a former director of Literature Wales and former Co-Chair of The Poetry Society. She was editor of New Welsh Review for three years. From 2012 to 2015, she was a researcher for the Devolved Voices literary research project, which was funded by the Leverhulme Trust and investigated Welsh poetry in English since 1997. She currently co-edits the digital poetry journal Bad Lilies. Gray lives in London.

== Poetry ==
- The Never-Never, Seren Books, (2004)
- Flowers, Rack Press (2017)
- Hollywood or Home, Seren Books (2023)

== Awards ==
- (2001) Eric Gregory Award
- (2004) Shortlisted for the Forward Prize for best first collection, (2004)
- (2004) Shortlisted for the T. S. Eliot Prize
