= Maggie Hannan =

Maggie Hannan (born 1962) is an English poet, formerly based in Hull, now living in County Sligo, Ireland. She is the author of a single 'but highly influential' collection of poetry, Liar, Jones. She won the Eric Gregory Award in 1990. She was shortlisted for the Forward Best First Collection prize in 1995. She was director of the Humber Mouth Literature Festival.

== Bibliography ==
- 1995 Liar, Jones, Bloodaxe Books ISBN 1-85224-308-2
- The Nerve, Virago (co-editor)
- Wild Cards, Virago (co-editor)
