= Joanne Limburg =

British writer and poet

- Born: 1970 (age 55–56); London, England
- Writing career
- Notable works: Femenismo, Paraphernalia

Joanne Limburg (born 1970) is a British writer and poet based in Cambridge. She has published three books of poetry for adults, one book of poetry for children, a novel and two books of memoirs.

== Life ==
Limburg was born in London to parents who were Reform Jews and raised in Stanmore, a district of Hackney, and Edgware. Her grandmother came from Kremenchug in Ukraine, while her father's family arrived before the late 19th century. At Cambridge University, she studied philosophy. Followed by an MA in Psychoanalytic Studies at the University of Kent.

She won an Eric Gregory Award in 1998 for her poetry. Her first book of poetry, Femenismo was published in 2000. The book was shortlisted for the 2000 Forward Prize Best First Collection. Her debut novel, A Want of Kindness, which concerns the 18th century monarch Queen Anne, was published in 2015. "Despite the constraints imposed by her wet heroine, Limburg has written a deft, absorbing book about a fascinating period", wrote Antonia Senior in The Times.

Limburg has written about the guilt of her miscarriage and the possibility that she had thoughts of harming her baby. It was only during her pregnancy that she self diagnosed her own obsessive–compulsive disorder (OCD) and later it was confirmed by a specialist. She has Asperger's syndrome, which was diagnosed in her 30s.

The Woman Who Thought Too Much, a memoir, was published in January 2011.

Limburg was a Royal Literary Fund fellow based at Magdalene College (2008–10) and Newnham College (2016–17), both in Cambridge.

Following a PhD in Creative Writing at Kingston University she taught at De Montfort University. She now teaches at the Institute of Continuing Education, part of the University of Cambridge. In 2022 she was elected a Fellow of the Royal Society of Literature.

== Works include ==
- Femenismo, 2000
- Paraphernalia, 2007 (Poetry Book Society Recommendation)
- The Woman Who Thought Too Much, 2011 (shortlisted for Mind Book of the Year Award)
- The Oxygen Man, 2012
- Bookside Down, 2013
- A Want of Kindness, 2015
- The Autistic Alice, 2017
- Small Pieces, 2017
- Letters to My Weird Sisters, 2021
