= G. M. Young =

English historian

Young in 1939

George Malcolm Young CB (29 April 1882 – 18 November 1959) was an English historian, best known for his book on Victorian times in Britain, Portrait of an Age (1936).

After a brief stint as an academic and a more than 20-year career as a civil servant, Young began to pursue a literary career in the mid-1920s. His books include studies of Edward Gibbon (1932), Charles I and Oliver Cromwell (1935) and Stanley Baldwin (1952) and the published texts of his lectures on literary and political topics.

== Life and career ==
=== Early years ===
Young was born at Charlton, Kent, on 29 April 1882, the only son of the four children of George Frederick Young, waterman, later a steamer master, and his wife, Rosetta Jane Elizabeth, née Ross. He was educated at St Paul's School and Balliol College, Oxford, graduating from the latter in 1904 with a second in literae humaniores. In 1905 he was elected a Fellow of All Souls College, Oxford and became a tutor at St John's College (1906–1908).

In 1908 Young joined the Board of Education, headed by Sir Robert Morant, under whose reorganisation he worked in the universities department. When the board's Standing Advisory Committee for University Grants was established in 1911, Young was its first secretary, and from 1917 was joint permanent secretary of the short-lived Ministry of Reconstruction, alongside Vaughan Nash. In that capacity he accompanied Arthur Henderson, then a member of the war cabinet, on a visit to Russia in 1917, where Young met Francis Lindley, counsellor in the British embassy. He went with Lindley to Archangel and later accompanied him to Vienna when Lindley was posted there as high commissioner. In Vienna, Young was for a time a director of the new Anglo-Austrian Bank.

=== Writer ===
The failure of the Ministry of Reconstruction to bring about substantial domestic reforms left Young disillusioned. He resigned from the public service in the early 1920s and devoted himself to literature. In a 1983 study, James A. Colaiaco writes that Young became prominent in London intellectual society and participated in "lively discussions at the Athenaeum" while "his judgment continued to mature and his literary skills were perfected".

Mona Wilson

In the late 1920s Young corresponded on a literary topic with the author Mona Wilson, who before her retirement from the civil service had been a colleague at the Ministry of Reconstruction. She asked him down for the weekend to her house at Oare, near Marlborough, Wiltshire. As his publisher, Rupert Hart-Davis, put it in 1956: "To cut a long story short, he stayed there for twenty-five years, until M.W. died a year or two ago. There was, so far as I know, no just cause or impediment why they shouldn't have married, but they just didn't. I'm sure their relationship was entirely intellectual and companionable."

As a writer, Young was, in the words of the Oxford Dictionary of National Biography (ODNB), "in no hurry". His 1931 essay Victorian History, published in Life and Letters, was "his first venture into scholarly polemics". It arose from his extensive reading of the history of the Victorian age and his conviction that the received wisdom about the period, exemplified in Lytton Strachey's Eminent Victorians, was wrong and unjust. The following year, at the age of 50, he published his first book, a study of Edward Gibbon (1932). It was well received; The Sphere found it "a clever piece of portraiture … admiring but critical"; The New York Times considered that although intended for popular consumption, it revealed why Gibbon's genius remained "as little out of date as the Parthenon".

The Oxford University Press asked Young to edit two volumes of essays on Early Victorian England. (Note: Contributors included Ralph Hale Mottram on life in the new towns; Bernard Darwin on country life and sport; George Alexander Ballard on the Royal Navy; Sir John Fortescue on the army; Basil Lubbock on the mercantile marine; Paul Oppé on architecture; E. J. Dent on music; Allardyce Nicoll on drama; and Mona Wilson on holidays and travel.) They were published in 1934, with a final summary chapter by Young, which he subsequently developed into the 230-page Portrait of an Age (1936), the work by which he is most remembered. The Observer called it "the greatest single study of the age in any language"; The Times said in 1959, "The Portrait was at once recognized as an outstanding piece of interpretation, and it is not too much to say that in the more than 20 years since it appeared its reputation and influence have grown steadily", and Simon Schama has described it as "an immortal classic, the greatest long essay ever written". Though far from uncritical of the Victorian age, Young acknowledged himself as a product of it: "I was born when the Queen had still nearly nineteen years to reign: I saw her twice, Gladstone once: I well remember the death of Newman and Tennyson, and my earliest recollection of the Abbey brings back the flowers fresh on Browning's grave".

Before the publication of Portrait of an Age, Young wrote an extended essay (175 pages) Charles I and Cromwell, described by the ODNB as an essay in detection. In 1937 Hart-Davis persuaded Young to publish Daylight and Champaign a collection of essays and articles, many of them reprinted from the journals and papers to which Young was by now a frequent contributor.

=== Later years ===
During the Second World War, Young served in the Home Guard, as what one of his friends called "a most improbable platoon commander". After the war, Young published two more collections of articles and essays: Today and Yesterday (1948) and Last Essays (1950), in which, according to the ODNB, "he found elbow-room for good talk, addressed purposely to the middlebrow, about literature, persons, and manners". Writing for the general reader was an effort for Young who, Hart-Davis said, "always assumes that one is his intellectual equal and makes no concessions … This, though flattering, often carried matters well over my head until I knew him well enough to ask for explanations of all the allusions I couldn’t understand". (Note: Young did not invariably write for a general reader. Portrait of an Age has an opening inscription beginning "ἀρεταὶ δ᾽ αἰεὶ μεγάλαι πολύμυθοι", which he neither translates nor attributes. (It is from Pindar, and means, roughly, that a lot of words are generated about great events of the past, although they are better discussed briefly.))

In 1947 Young undertook the editorship of the Victorian volume in the series "English Historical Documents", but declining health limited his contribution, and when the volume was published in 1956 most of it was the work of his co-editor, W. D. Handcock. When Mona Wilson grew too old and frail to remain at her house and retired to a nursing home, Young, who had been re-elected a Fellow in 1948, moved into rooms at All Souls.

Young's last book was a biography of Stanley Baldwin, which Baldwin had wished him to write. He found the task a struggle. His earlier books, Hart-Davis said, "came largely out of his head, where their subject-matter had been brewing up for many years", whereas this biography required a great deal of original research, which Young found tedious and frustrating, as Baldwin left few personal papers and did not keep a diary. When the book was printed Winston Churchill and Lord Beaverbrook threatened to sue if certain passages were not removed or altered. Hart-Davis had the "hideously expensive" job of removing and replacing seven leaves from 7,580 copies. Neither the publisher nor Young's biographers in the ODNB found the book up to the author's usual standard.

Young died in Thames Bank Nursing Home, Goring, Oxfordshire, on 18 November 1959, at the age of 77.

== Honours and appointments ==
Young was appointed CB in the 1917 Birthday Honours for his work as a civil servant. From 1937 he was a trustee of the National Portrait Gallery and from 1947 to 1957, of the British Museum. He was a member of the Royal Commission on the Press (1947–1949) and he received honorary degrees from Durham (1950) and Cambridge (1953); and an honorary fellowship at Balliol (1953).

== Works ==
=== Books ===
- Gibbon, 1932
- (ed.) Early Victorian England, 1830-1865. 2 vols, 1934.
- Charles I and Cromwell: An Essay, 1935
- Portrait of an Age, 1936
- Daylight and Champaign: Essays, 1937
- The Government of Britain, 1941
- Basic, 1943 – a tract for the Society for Pure English
- Today and Yesterday: Collected Essays and Addresses, 1948
- Scott and History, 1950
- Last Essays, 1950
- Stanley Baldwin, 1952
- (with W. D. Handcock) English Historical Documents, 1833–1914, 1956
- Victorian Essays, a collection of 25 of Young's previously published essays on the topic, selected and introduced by Handcock, 1962

=== Published texts of lectures delivered by Young ===
- The Age of Tennyson, 1939
- Burke, 1943
- Rights and Duties in the Modern State, 1946
- Shakespeare and the Termers, 1947
- The Good Society, 1950

== See also ==
- A History of England

== Notes, references and sources ==
=== Sources ===
- Hart-Davis, Rupert (1998). Halfway to Heaven: Concluding memoirs of a literary life. Stroud Gloucestershire: Sutton. p. 38. ISBN 978-0-7509-1837-4.
- Lyttelton, George; Rupert Hart-Davis (1978). The Lyttelton Hart-Davis Letters, Volume I. London: John Murray. ISBN 978-0-7195-3478-2.
- Young, G. M. (2002) [1936]. Portrait of an Age. London: Phoenix Press. ISBN 978-1-84212-598-4.
