= Olivia Cole (poet) =

British poet (born 1981)

Olivia Cole (born 1981) is a British poet.

== Biography ==
Cole was born and raised in Kent, and read English at Christ Church, Oxford.

After being a winner of the 2003 Eric Gregory Award, Cole quickly made her mark as a poet. In 2006, she appeared on the BBC documentary, Betjeman & Me: Griff Rhys Jones.

Her first collection, Restricted View, was published in 2009.

Cole also works as a journalist in London and has written for The Spectator, the Financial Times, the London Evening Standard and The New Statesman.
