= Mukahang Limbu =

Nepalese British poet (born 2001)

Mukahang Limbu (born 2001) is a Nepalese British poet.

== Life and career ==
Born in Nepal, Limbu moved to the UK aged 6. He attended Oxford Spires Academy where he was taught by the poet Kate Clanchy. While still at school, he won the Sunday Times/First Story National Writing Competition; was three times commended in the Foyle Competition, and won the Slambassadors Competition of 2017; and was published in the anthology England, Poems from a School (Picador). In 2019 he won the Out-Spoken Prize for Poetry for The Cleaners, a sequence of poems in the voices of Nepalese women cleaners in a hotel, inspired by his mother.

Limbu attended The Queen's College, Oxford, reading English and German. During this time he was editor in chief of The Isis Magazine and published a pamphlet of poems with Out-Spoken Press: Mother of Flip Flops. This was a Poetry Book Society Choice and was selected as a "best recent book" in the Guardian which stated "The fine poems of this promising debut offer complex gay rite-of-passage narratives and tales of immigrant experience, all the while looking nervously back towards Nepal".

In 2023 Limbu was awarded an Eric Gregory Award and took up the Cambridge Harper Wood Scholarship.

== Selected publications ==
- Clanchy, Kate (2018). England, Poems from a School. UK: Picador. p. 218. ISBN 978-1509886609.
- Limbu, Mukahang (2021). Mother of Flip Flops. Out-Spoken. ISBN 978-1838427283.
- Limbu, Mukahang (11 October 2023). "Where will you not go? - The Society of Authors". Society of Authors. The Author.
