= Sarah Corbett (poet) =

British poet

- Born: 1970 (age 55–56); Chester, England
- Education: University of Leeds; University of East Anglia; University of Manchester
- Occupation: Poet
- Writing career
- Language: English
- Notable awards: Eric Gregory Award (1997)

Sarah Corbett (born 1970) is a British poet.

She graduated with a degree in English and sociology from the University of Leeds in 1992, an MA in creative writing from the University of East Anglia in 1998, and a PhD in creative and critical writing from the University of Manchester in 2013. She has published five collections of poetry, including the verse-novel, 'And She Was' (2015) and 'A Perfect Mirror' (2018). The Red Wardrobe won an Eric Gregory Award in 1998, and was shortlisted for the T. S. Eliot Prize and Forward Prize. She is a lecturer at Lancaster University, having previously taught for the Open University.

== Awards ==
- 1997 Eric Gregory Award, The Red Wardrobe

== Bibliography ==
- The Red Wardrobe (Seren Books, 1998)
- The Witch Bag (Seren Books, 2002)
- Other Beasts (Seren Books, 2008)
- 'And She Was' (Pavilion Poetry/Liverpool University Press, 2015)
- 'A Perfect Mirror' (Pavilion Poetry/Liverpool University Press, 2018)
