= Paul Henry (poet) =

Welsh poet, songwriter and broadcaster

- Born: 1959 (age 66–67); Aberystwyth, Wales
- Occupations: Poet, songwriter
- Writing career
- Language: English
- Period: 1989–
- Notable awards: Eric Gregory Award, 1989; Wales Book of the Year, 2023
- Website: www.paulhenrywales.co.uk

Paul Henry (b. Aberystwyth, 1959) is a Welsh poet, songwriter and broadcaster. In 2023, he won the English Language Poetry Category at Wales Book of the Year for his collection, As If To Sing. His poetry collection Boy Running was also shortlisted for the Wales Book of the Year award in 2016. Poet Laureate Carol Ann Duffy has called him "one of the most important Welsh poets now writing".

== Biography ==
Starting out as a singer-songwriter, Henry's first collection Time Pieces was published by Seren Press in 1991, winning a Gregory Award. In 1992, he attended Joseph Brodsky's poetry masterclass at the Hay Festival, since which time a further eight books have appeared. His poems have been widely anthologised and can be found in journals such as Poetry Review and The Times Literary Supplement. They have also featured on BBC Radio 4's Poetry Please.

The Brittle Sea, New & Selected Poems was recently reprinted by Seren in the UK and by Dronequill in India, under the title The Black Guitar. Mari d’Ingrid, Gerard Augustin's translation of his fifth collection, Ingrid’s Husband, is published by L’Harmattan. He was described by the late U. A. Fanthorpe as "a poet's poet who combines a sense of the music of words with an endlessly inventive imagination".

Henry teaches creative writing at writers' centres and has lectured at the University of South Wales. He has read and performed his songs at venues across Europe, the US and India. His co-readers have included Paul Muldoon, Carol Ann Duffy, Don Paterson and Vikram Seth. Henry is a featured poet in the UK pages of Poetry International and in the British Council authors' pages. More recently, he has written and presented arts programmes for BBC Radio 3 and Radio 4. In March 2026, he performed with the band Stornoway at the Royal Albert Hall, reading from his collection The Glass Aisle.

== Works ==
Poetry:

- 2022: As If To Sing, Seren
- 2018: The Glass Aisle, Seren
- 2016: Boy Running, Seren
- 2011: The Black Guitar - Selected Poems, Dronequill (India)
- 2010: The Brittle Sea: New & Selected Poems, Seren
- 2008: Mari d'Ingrid, L'Harmattan (tr. Gerard Augustin)
- 2007: Ingrid’s Husband, Seren
- 2004: The Breath of Sleeping Boys & other poems, Carreg Gwalch
- 2002: The Slipped Leash, Seren
- 1998: The Milk Thief, Seren
- 1996: Captive Audience, Seren
- 1991: Time Pieces, Seren
