= Eleanor Rees =

British poet (born 1978)

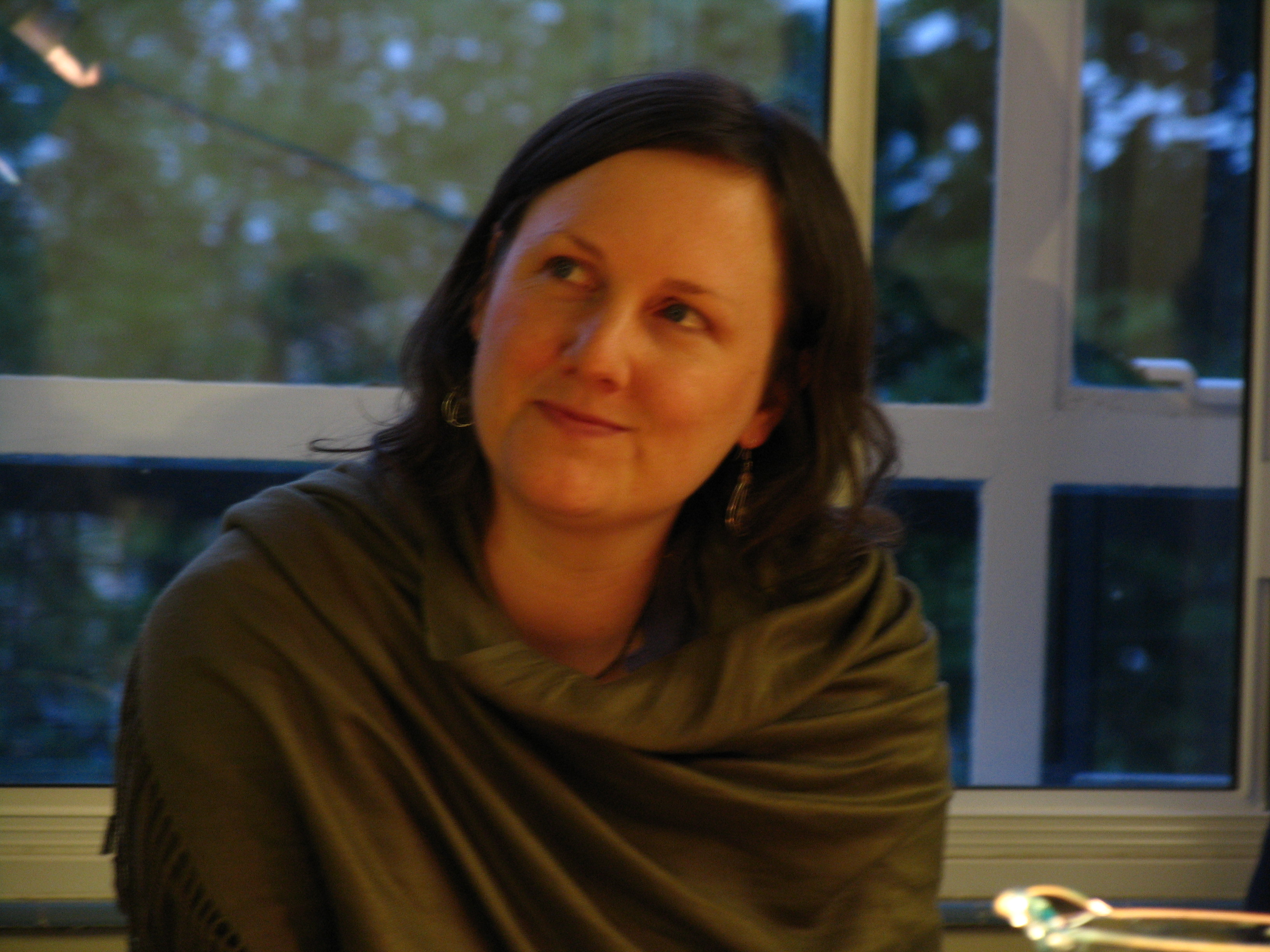
- Eleanor Rees
- Born: 1978 (age 47–48); Birkenhead, England
- Education: University of Sheffield; University of East Anglia; University of Exeter
- Occupation: Poet
- Writing career
- Language: English
- Notable awards: Eric Gregory Award (2002)
- Website: www.eleanorrees.info

Eleanor K. Rees (born 1978) is a British poet.

She graduated with a BA in English Literature from the University of Sheffield in 2001, and an MA in creative writing from the University of East Anglia in 2002. She has a PhD from the University of Exeter. She has published six collections of poetry. She received an Eric Gregory Award in 2002 for her pamphlet collection of poetry, Feeding Fire. Andraste's Hair was shortlisted for the Forward Prize Best First Collection and the Glen Dimplex New Writers Award for Poetry. Her third collection, Eliza and the Bear (from which the band take their name), was published in 2010. Her fourth collection is Blood Child, followed by Riverine, both published 2015. Her latest collection is The Well at Winter Solstice, 2019.

== Awards ==
- 2002 Eric Gregory Award

== Bibliography ==
- Feeding Fire (Spout, 2001)
- Andraste's Hair (Salt, 2007)
- Eliza and the Bear (Salt, 2010)
- Blood Child (Pavilion Poets, 2015)
- Riverine (Gatehouse, 2015)
- The Well at Winter Solstice (Salt, 2019)
- Tam Lin of the Winter Park (Guillemot, 2022)
