= Maurice Keen =

English historian (1933–2012)

- Born: Maurice Hugh Keen; 30 October 1933; London, United Kingdom
- Died: 11 September 2012 (aged 78)
- Education: Balliol College, Oxford
- Occupation: Historian
- Writing career
- Subjects: Middle Ages; Medieval warfare Chivalry

Maurice Hugh Keen OBE FBA FRHistS FSA (30 October 1933 – 11 September 2012) was a British historian specializing in the Middle Ages.

== Life ==
Keen's father had been the Oxford University head of finance ('Keeper of the University Chest') and a fellow of Balliol College, Oxford, and after schooling at Winchester College, Maurice became an undergraduate there in 1954. He was a contemporary and lifelong friend of Tom Bingham, later the Senior Law Lord, as well as of the military historian, Sir John Keegan, whose sister Mary he married.

Keen's first success came with the writing of The Outlaws of Medieval Legend while still a junior research fellow at The Queen's College, Oxford, 1957–1961. He was elected a tutorial fellow of Balliol in 1961, retaining his fellowship until his retirement in 2000, when he was elected a fellow emeritus. He also served as junior dean (1963–68), tutor for admissions (1974–1978), and vice-master (1980–83).

In 1984, Keen won the Wolfson History Prize for his book Chivalry. The book redefined in several ways the concept of chivalry, underlining the military aspect of it.

Keen was elected a Fellow of the British Academy, a Fellow of the Royal Historical Society, and a Fellow of the Society of Antiquaries of London.

He appears in the 1989 fictional novel The Negotiator by Frederick Forsyth.

He was an enthusiastic governor of Blundell's School in Tiverton for many years, the school being linked to Balliol by a scholarship and fellowship foundation gift.

== Selected works ==
- (1965) The Laws of War in the Late Middle Ages, Routledge & Kegan Paul
- (1967) A History of Medieval Europe, Routledge & Kegan Paul, ISBN 0-7100-2899-7
- (1973) England in the Later Middle Ages, London: Methuen, ISBN 0-416-75990-4
- (1978) The Outlaws of Medieval Legend Univ of Toronto Press, ISBN 0-8020-1612-X
- (1984) Chivalry, New Haven: Yale University Press, ISBN 0-300-03150-5
- (1986) Some Late Mediaeval Views on Nobility: the Creighton Trust Lecture 1985, University of London, ISBN 0-7187-0760-5
- (1991) The Penguin History of Medieval Europe, Penguin Books, ISBN 0-14-013630-4
- (1996) Nobles, Knights and Men-at-arms in the Middle Ages, Hambledon Continuum, ISBN 1-85285-087-6
- (1999) Medieval Warfare: A History. Oxford University Press
- (2002) Origins of the English Gentleman, Stroud: Tempus, ISBN 0-7524-2558-7
- (2010) Chivalry, London : The Folio Society

== See also ==
- A History of England
- The Negotiator (novel)
