= Rhian Edwards (poet) =

Welsh poet

- Born: Bridgend, Wales
- Occupation: Poet
- Writing career
- Language: English
- Period: 2008–
- Notable work: Clueless Dogs (2012)
- Notable awards: Wales Book of the Year, 2013

Rhian Edwards is a Welsh poet. Her debut collection of poetry, Clueless Dogs, was named the Wales Book of the Year in 2013.

== Biography ==
Edwards was born in Bridgend, Wales, and moved to Derbyshire, England while she was in primary school. She studied a bachelor's degree in law at the London School of Economics and, after completing a master's degree, began working as a tax consultant. After failing one of her tax exams, she left her job as a tax consultant to work for the Financial Times; she sold advertising space in the newspaper but hoped to join its editorial staff. She began writing poetry after meeting a group of poets in London and attending a performance night at the Covent Garden Poetry Café. She was also a singer and songwriter before becoming a full-time writer.

Parade the Fib, a pamphlet of Edwards' poems, was published by Tall Lighthouse and was listed as a Poetry Book Society Choice in 2008. Her first book of poetry, titled Clueless Dogs, was published in 2012 by Seren Books. At the 2013 Wales Book of the Year Awards, Clueless Dogs won the overall prize for Wales Book of the Year, as well as the People's Choice Award and the Roland Mathias Prize for Poetry. It was also shortlisted for the 2012 Forward Prize for Best First Collection.

A prolific performer, Edwards has given over 400 poetry readings at festivals, on radio, and on stage, and won the John Tripp Award for Spoken Poetry in 2011–2012. In 2013, she became the first writer-in-residence at Aberystwyth Arts Centre. Edwards currently lives in Bridgend with her daughter.

== Publications ==
=== Poetry ===
- 2008: Parade the Fib, Tall Lighthouse
- 2012: Clueless Dogs, Seren
- 2017: Brood, Seren
- 2020: The Estate Agent's Daughter, Seren
