= Thomas Warner (poet) =

British poet (born 1979)

- Born: 1979 (age 46–47); Mansfield, England
- Education: University of East Anglia
- Occupation: Poet
- Writing career
- Language: English
- Notable awards: Eric Gregory Award (2001)
- Website: www.tomwarner.co.uk

Thomas C. Warner (born 1979) is a British poet.

He graduated with an MA with Distinction in Creative Writing from the University of East Anglia in 2002. He won an Eric Gregory Award in 2001, and was commended in the National Poetry Competition 2014.

== Awards ==
- 2001 Eric Gregory Award

== Bibliography ==
- Faber New Poets 8 (2010)
- Yoga (2014)
