= Peter Hunter Blair =

British academic and historian (1912–1982)

Peter Hunter Blair FBA FRHistS
- Peter Hunter Blair in 1958
- Born: 22 March 1912
- Died: 9 September 1982 (aged 70)

Academic background
- Education: Durham School
- Alma mater: Emmanuel College, Cambridge

Academic work
- Discipline: Historian
- Sub-discipline: Anglo-Saxon England
- Institutions: Emmanuel College, Cambridge; Department of Anglo-Saxon, Norse and Celtic, University of Cambridge

Peter Hunter Blair (22 March 1912 – 9 September 1982) was an English academic and historian specializing in the Anglo-Saxon period.

== Life ==
He was the son of Charles Henry Hunter Blair and his wife Alice Maude Mary France. He was educated at Durham School and Emmanuel College, Cambridge.

Hunter Blair was a fellow of Emmanuel College and Reader in the Department of Anglo-Saxon, Norse and Celtic, University of Cambridge.

In 1970, Hunter Blair was elected a fellow of the Royal Historical Society and in 1980 to a Fellowship of British Academy.

== Wife ==
In 1969 Blair married his third wife, the children's author Pauline Clarke. She edited his Anglo-Saxon Northumbria in 1984.

== Selected publications ==
- Bede's Ecclesiastical History of the English Nation and Its Importance Today: Jarrow Lecture 1959. Jarrow Lectures. 1959.
- An Introduction to Anglo-Saxon England, with a new introduction by Simon Keynes (Third ed.). Cambridge: Cambridge University Press. 2003 [1956]. ISBN 0-521-53777-0.
- Roman Britain and Early England: 55 B.C. – A.D. 871. Norton Library History of England. Edinburgh & New York: Nelson, W. W. Norton & Company. 1963. ISBN 0-351-15318-7.
- The Coming of Pout. London: Jonathan Cape. 1966.
- The World of Bede. London: Secker & Warburg. 1970. ISBN 0-436-05010-2.
- Northumbria in the Days of Bede. London: Victor Gollancz Ltd. 1976. ISBN 0-575-01840-2.
- Lapidge, Michael; Hunter Blair, Pauline, eds. (1984). Anglo-Saxon Northumbria. London: Variorum Reprints. ISBN 9780860781417. (Reprint of essays by Peter Hunter Blair published 1939 to 1976)

== See also ==
- A History of England

== Bibliography ==
- Clemoes, Peter (1985). Peter Hunter Blair: 1912–1982 (PDF). Vol. LXX. British Academy. pp. 451–461. ISBN 978-0-19-726037-1.
