= A History of England =

Series of reprinted history books

A History of England (1997–2002) is a series of reprints of twelve classic, magisterial volumes of different periods of English history, together constituting a continuous history from ancient Roman times to the end of the 20th century. The volumes were selected by, and under the general editorship of, British historian Felipe Fernandez-Armesto, and published by the Folio Society.

Fernandez-Armesto made his choices on the basis of "variety" and from among historians "eminent in their day and influential since". They are "not meant to be consistent or even compatible", but are all "likely to endure".

== The twelve volumes ==
1. A History of England, Volume I: Britannia, a History of Roman Britain by Sheppard Frere (1999); 431 pages

- Original publication date: 1967; Folio Society edition is a reprint of the 3rd (1987) edition (with further revisions and a new foreword).

2. A History of England, Volume II: Anglo-Saxon England by Peter Hunter Blair (1997); Introduction by Simon Keynes; 364 pages

- Original publication date: 1956 (as An Introduction to Anglo-Saxon England); Folio Society edition is a reprint of the 2nd (1977) edition with augmented bibliography.

3. A History of England, Volume III: Early Medieval England by M. T. Clanchy (1997); 452 pages

- Original publication date: 1984; Folio Society edition is a reprint of the ?th (19??) edition.

4. A History of England, Volume IV: England in the Later Middle Ages by M. H. Keen (1997); 534 pages

- Original publication date: 1973; Folio Society edition is a reprint of the ?th (19??) edition.

5. A History of England, Volume V: England Under the Tudors by G. R. Elton (1997); 518 pages

- Original publication date: 1955; Folio Society edition is a reprint of the 3rd (1991) edition "with emendations".

6. A History of England, Volume VI: England Under the Stuarts by George Macaulay Trevelyan (1999); 503 pages

- Original publication date: 19??; Folio Society edition is a reprint of the ?th (19??) edition.

7. A History of England, Volume VII: England in the Eighteenth Century by Roy Porter (1998); 528 pages

- Original publication date: 1982; Folio Society edition is a reprint of the ?th (1990) edition.

8. A History of England, Volume VIII: England in the Age of Improvement 1783–1867 by Asa Briggs (2002); 498 pages

- Original publication date: 19?59 Folio Society edition is a reprint of the 2nd (2000) edition.

9. A History of England, Volume IX: Victorian England by G. M. Young (2002); 542 pages

- Original publication date: 1934; Folio Society edition is a reprint of the ?th (1965) edition

10. A History of England: Volume X: Edwardian England by Elie Halevy (1999); 535 pages

- Original publication date: 1931–32; Folio Society edition is a reprint of the ?th (19??) edition.

11. A History of England, Volume XI: England 1914–1945 by A. J. P. Taylor (2000); 638 pages

- Original publication date: 1965; Folio Society edition is a reprint of the ?th (1965) edition.

12. A History of England, Volume XII: England 1945–2000 by Felipe Fernandez-Armesto (2001); Foreword by Roy Jenkins; 623 pages

- First edition. Consists of essays by John Charmley, S. J. Ball, Ron Ramdin, Peter Vansittart, Anna Bramwell, John Burnett, Richard Hoggart, Kenneth o Morgan, Chris Wrigley, Edward Norman, Tim Heald, Nick Tiratsoo, Stephen Timmin, Hugh Thomas, Philip Hoare, John Campbell, Peter Jay, Dorothy Porter, Lynne Segal, Vernon Bogdanor, Hugh Vickers, Felipe Fernandez-Armesto, and Ferdinand Mount.
