= Felipe Fernández-Armesto =

British historian (born 1950)

Felipe Fernández-Armesto (born 1950) is a British professor of history and author of several popular works, notably on cultural and environmental history.

== Life and career ==
He was born in London; his father was the Spanish journalist Felipe Fernández Armesto (who wrote using the pseudonym Augusto Assía) and his mother was Betty Millan, a British-born journalist and co-founder (with Remy Hefter, in 1947) and editor of The Diplomatist (whose current title is Diplomat), the in-house journal of the diplomatic corps in London.

Felipe Fernandez-Armesto joined the history department at the University of Notre Dame in 2009, after occupying chairs at Tufts University and at Queen Mary College, University of London. He had spent most of his career teaching at Oxford, where he was an undergraduate and doctoral student. He has had visiting appointments at many universities and research institutes in Europe and the Americas and has honorary doctorates from La Trobe University and the University of the Andes, Colombia. He began his teaching career at Charterhouse School in Godalming, Surrey.

In 1982 he published The Canary Islands after the Conquest: The Making of a Colonial Society in the Early Sixteenth Century, an archival study of the Canary Islands during the period of their original settlement. In 1987 he published Before Columbus: Exploration and Colonization from the Mediterranean to the Atlantic 1229–1492, a study of the earliest phase of European imperialism when Europeans left the Mediterranean and colonized the islands along the northwest coast of Africa.

Fernández-Armesto gained media attention in 2007 for allegedly being a victim of police brutality at the hands of the Atlanta Police Department, following an incident of jaywalking.

== Awards and honours ==
Among other distinctions, Fernández-Armesto has won the John Carter Brown Medal, the Caird Medal of the National Maritime Museum (UK), the Premio Nacional an Investigacion of the Sociedad Geográfica Española, Spain's Premio Nacional de Gastronomia for his history of food, and the Tercentenary Medal of the Society of Antiquaries of London.

- 2017: Grand Cross of the Civil Order of Alfonso X, "Spain's highest honour for contributors to science, scholarship, education, and the arts"
- 2008: Universidad de los Andes, honorary doctorate
- 2007: World History Association Book Prize, Pathfinders: A Global History of Exploration

== Selected works ==
- Columbus and the Conquest of the Impossible (Weidenfeld & Nicolson, 1974)
- Ferdinand and Isabella (Weidenfeld & Nicolson, 1975)
- The Canary Islands after the Conquest: The Making of a Colonial Society in the Sixteenth Century (Oxford University Press, 1982)
- Before Columbus: Exploration and Colonization from the Mediterranean to the Atlantic, 1229–1492 (University of Pennsylvania Pr, 1987)
- The Spanish Armada: The Experience of War in 1588 (Oxford University Press, 1988)
- Columbus (Oxford University Press, 1991)
- Barcelona: A Thousand Years of the City's Past (Trafalgar Square, 1991)
- The Times Illustrated History of Europe (Times Books, 1995)
- Millennium: A History of Our Last Thousand Years (Bantam Press, 1995)
- Reformation: Christianity and the World 1500-2000 (Bantam Press, 1996) or Reformations: A Radical Interpretation of Christianity and the World, 1500-2000 (Scribner, 1997) (co-authored with Derek Wilson)
- Truth: A History and a Guide for the Perplexed (Bantam Press, 1997)
- Civilizations (Macmillan, 2000) or Civilizations: Culture, Ambition, and the Transformation of Nature (Free Press, 2001) {Review}
- Food: A History (Macmillan, 2001) or Near a Thousand Tables: A History of Food (Free Press, 2002)
- The Americas: A Hemispheric History (Modern Library, 2003) or The Americas: A History of A Hemisphere (Weidenfeld & Nicolson, 2003)
- Ideas That Changed the World (Dorling Kindersley, 2003)
- Humankind: A Brief History (Oxford University Press, 2004)
- Pathfinders: A Global History of Exploration (W. W. Norton, 2006; Oxford University Press, 2007)
- Amerigo: The Man Who Gave His Name to America (Weidenfeld & Nicolson, 2006; Random House, 2007)
- The World: A Brief History (Pearson, 2007)
- 1492. The Year the World Began (HarperOne, 2009; Bloomsbury, 2010)
- Our America: A Hispanic History of the United States (W. W. Norton & Co., 2014)
- A Foot in the River: Why Our Lives Change–and the Limits of Evolution (Oxford University Press, 2015)
- The Oxford Illustrated History of the World (Oxford University Press, 2019)
- Out of Our Minds: What We Think and How We Came to Think It (Oneworld, 2019)
- Straits: Beyond the Myth of Magellan (Bloomsbury, 2022)
- How the Spanish Empire Was Built: A 400 Year History (Reaktion Books, 2024)

=== As editor ===
- A History of England (The Folio Society, 1997–2002)
- The Times Guide to the Peoples of Europe: The Essential Handbook to Europe's Tribes (Times Books, 1994)
- The Times Atlas of World Exploration (Times Books, 1991)
