= Kate Clanchy =

British writer (born 1965)

Kate Clanchy MBE
- Born: 1965 (age 60–61); Glasgow, Scotland
- Education: George Watson's College; University of Oxford
- Occupations: Poet, teacher, writer
- Parent(s): Michael Clanchy; Joan Clanchy
- Awards: Eric Gregory Award; Forward Poetry Prize; Scottish First Book of the Year BBC National Short Story Prize; Orwell Prize for Political Writing

Kate Clanchy MBE (born 1965) is a British poet, freelance writer and teacher.

== Early life and education ==
Clanchy was born in 1965 in Glasgow to medieval historian Michael Clanchy and teacher Joan Clanchy (née Milne). She was educated at George Watson's College, a private school in Edinburgh, and at the University of Oxford, where she studied English.

== Career ==
Clanchy lived in the East End of London for several years, before moving to Oxford, where she was a fellow of Oxford Brookes University and served as City Poet. She is Writer in Residence for Sanctuary Arts, at Mansfield College, Oxford. In 2021, she wrote an essay about the deaths of her parents from COVID-19.

=== Teaching ===
Clanchy qualified as a teacher in 1989 and has taught since in several different institutions. From 2009 to 2019, she combined employment as a teacher and a role as Writer in Residence at Oxford Spires Academy, a multicultural comprehensive school. Students included Mukahang Limbu, Shukria Rezaei, and Amineh Abou Kerech. In 2018, she edited an anthology of poems written by her students, England: Poems from a School, which was widely reviewed. Over the lockdown period of 2020, Clanchy met on Zoom with her students and published their poems on Twitter where they became popular. In 2021, she published a self-help guide to writing poetry, How to Grow Your Own Poem.

=== Writing ===
Clanchy won an Eric Gregory Award in 1995. She published three poetry collections between 1996 and 2004. They won a Forward Prize, the Scottish First Book of the Year (then Saltire Prize) two Scottish Arts Council Book Awards, and a Somerset Maugham Award. In 2008, she moved into non-fiction with a memoir about her relationship with her Kosovan neighbour, What is She Doing Here? This was republished as Antigona and Me and won the Writers Guild Award. In 2009, she won both the VS Pritchett and BBC National Short Story Award. This was followed by a novel, Meeting the English, which was shortlisted for the Costa Prize, and a collection of short stories, The Not Dead and the Saved.

Clanchy has written and adapted for BBC Radio since 2001 with 12 plays and serials produced, including Hester, A Little Princess, which starred Adjoa Andoh and Enduring Love. In 2015, her broadcast anthology of her pupils' work, We Are Writing a Poem About Home, was shortlisted for the Ted Hughes Award. In 2018, she was awarded a Cholmondeley Award.

==== Some Kids I Taught and What They Taught Me ====
Clanchy's 2019 memoir of her teaching experience, Some Kids I Taught and What They Taught Me won the Orwell Prize for Political Writing in 2020, but also incurred criticism for "racist and ableist stereotyping" in some of its descriptions of schoolchildren. In 2021, Clanchy posted on Twitter encouraging followers to report a Goodreads review of Some Kids I Taught and What They Taught Me, wrongly stating that they had "made up a racist quote and said it was in my book," and then saying that the quotes had been "taken out of context". Clanchy later apologised for "overreacting" to criticism and promised to rewrite the book, writing on Twitter: “I know I got many things wrong, and welcome the chance to write better, more lovingly."

Clanchy was criticised by other authors, including Chimene Suleyman, Monisha Rajesh and Sunny Singh, who received large amounts of abuse as a result of the online debate. An open letter signed by over 950 people from the publishing industry condemned the targeted harassment of the critics. Clanchy's publishers, Picador, an imprint of Macmillan Publishing, issued three statements of apology in August 2021 and stated that the book would be rewritten. Further statements of apology were made following an interview with Philip Gwyn Jones, publisher of Picador, in the Daily Telegraph in December 2021.

Clanchy was defended in articles by Sonia Sodha, who stated that "the strand of anti-racist thinking that is obsessed with the blame and shame all white people should bear for structural discrimination is (so) corrosive to common cause and understanding", and by Clive Davis, Tomiwa Owolade, Shukria Rezaei, Carmen Callil, Amanda Craig, and Philip Pullman. A group of her former students wrote that they were "disempowered and distressed" by the critics' allegations.

In December 2021, Clanchy published an article in Prospect magazine on the personal impact of public cancellation. Her publisher Picador announced they had parted company by mutual consent. In an interview for UnHerd, Clanchy said that the apology put out by Pan Macmillan had been made "over her head" and without consulting her. She subsequently wrote an article on sensitivity readers, which provoked discussion, especially in the context of the Roald Dahl revision controversy. Clanchy is now published by Swift Press.

In November 2025, Pan Macmillan CEO Joanna Prior apologised to Clanchy and others involved in the controversy, calling it "a regrettable series of events in Pan Macmillan's past". In November 2025 BBC Radio 4 launched a six-part podcast series on the events entitled Anatomy of a Cancellation.

==== Works ====
Other work includes:

- Samarkand. Picador. 1999. ISBN 978-0-330-37194-0.
- Slattern. Picador. 2001. ISBN 978-0-330-48929-4. 1st edition Chatto & Windus, 1995
- All The Poems You Need To Say Hello. Picador. 2004. ISBN 978-0-330-43384-6. (editor)
- Our Cat Henry Comes to the Swings. illustrated Jemima Bird. Oxford University Press. 2005. ISBN 978-0-19-272557-8.
- Newborn. Macmillan UK. 2006. ISBN 978-0-330-41931-4. 1st edition Picador, 2004
- What Is She Doing Here?: A Refugee's Story. Picador. 2008. ISBN 978-0-330-44382-1.
- Antigona and Me. Picador. 2009. ISBN 978-0-330-44933-5.
- Meeting the English. Picador. 2013. ISBN 978-0-330-53527-4.
- The Not Dead and the Saved 2015. ISBN 978-0330535250.
- England, Poems from a School. Picador. 3 December 2023. ISBN 978-1509886609.
- Some Kids I Taught and What They Taught Me. Picador. 2019. ISBN 978-1-5098-4029-8.
- How to Grow Your Own Poem. Picador. 2020. ISBN 978-1-5290-2469-2.

==== Honours and awards ====
Clanchy was appointed a Fellow of the Royal Society of Literature (FRSL) in 2010, and resigned her fellowship in 2023. She was appointed a Member of the Order of the British Empire (MBE) in the 2018 Birthday Honours. Other awards include:

- 1994 Eric Gregory Award
- 1997 Forward Poetry Prize (Best First Collection) for Slattern
- 1996 London Arts Board New Writer Award*
- 1996 Saltire Society Scottish First Book of the Year Award for Slattern
- 1996 Scottish Arts Council Book Award for Slattern
- 1997 Mail on Sunday/John Llewellyn Rhys Prize (shortlist) for Slattern
- 1997 Somerset Maugham Award for Slattern.
- 1999 Forward Poetry Prize (Best Poetry Collection of the Year) (shortlist) for Samarkand
- 1999 Scottish Arts Council Book Award for Samarkand
- 2004 Forward Poetry Prize (Best Poetry Collection of the Year) (shortlist) for Newborn
- 2009 Scottish Arts Council Book Award for What Is She Doing Here?: A Refugee's Story
- 2009 Writers' Guild Award for Best Book (What is She Doing Here)
- 2009 V. S. Pritchett Memorial Prize for 'The Not Dead and the Saved'
- 2009 BBC National Short Story Award for The Not-Dead and The Saved
- 2013 Costa Book Awards (First Novel), shortlisted for Meeting the English
- 2015 Ted Hughes Award for Poetry (shortlist)
- 2018 Cholmondeley Award.
- 2020 Orwell Prize for Political Writing for Some Kids I Taught and What They Taught Me
