= Seren Books =

Welsh independent publisher

- Status: Active
- Founded: 1981; 45 years ago
- Country of origin: Wales
- Headquarters location: Llantwit Major
- Distribution: Welsh Books Council (Wales); Inpress Books; Booksource
- Publication types: Books
- Official website: serenbooks.com

Seren Books is the trading name of Poetry Wales Press, an independent publisher based in Llantwit Major, Wales, specialising in English-language writing from Wales and also publishing other literary fiction, poetry and non-fiction. The press takes its name from the Welsh word for "star".

== History ==
The press was founded in 1981 by Cary Archard, a teacher who was then the editor of the quarterly magazine Poetry Wales. He decided to branch into publishing poetry collections and gained funding from the Arts Council of Wales, initially on an ad hoc basis. At first known as Poetry Wales Press Ltd, it was published from Archard's home in Bridgend. An early office was in Dannie Abse's house in Ogmore by Sea. According to the academic Sam Adams, Archard's twin initial aims were to encourage Welsh poets writing in the English language, particularly the younger generation; and to republish out-of-print works and thus make more sources available for teaching Welsh literature in English. The first collections from the press were by Mike Jenkins and Nigel Jenkins, together with a retrospective collection featuring Abse. Literary criticism was also part of its output from the outset.

In 1982, Poetry Wales Press received a block grant from the Arts Council of Wales, the first of its kind, which enabled it to set up an office in Bridgend and to appoint a full-time manager, Mick Felton. The grant later came from the Welsh Books Council; it was reassessed annually. In 1985, the press adopted the Seren imprint for works that were not poetry, and from 1989 the Seren imprint has been used for all publications. In 1986, an independent editor was appointed to oversee Poetry Wales. Since its foundation, the press has branched into literary fiction, biography and non-fiction. In 2011, Seren Books published 20–25 titles annually. Archard retired as manager in 1996; the press was subsequently run by Felton. The board of Directors has included Abse (from 1989), the academic M. Wynn Thomas (1993–2003), Patrick McGuinness (2004-present) and author Rachel Dawson. The press was based in Bridgend until May 2026 when it moved to Llantwit Major.

Mick Felton retired as Publisher in 2023. Bronwen Price was appointed as CEO and Head of Editorial & Production in 2024[9]. The team currently numbers 7 staff members, 4 of whom work part-time. Sarah Johnson is Deputy CEO and Head of Marketing & Sales. Rhian Edwards and Zoë Brigley work as Seren Books' Poetry Co-Editor, having replaced editor Amy Wack in 2022.

Seren Books ran the Seren Cardiff Poetry Festival from 2018 - 2021. The 2021 festival was held online due to COVID-19 pandemic. It currently publishes 15 titles annually, and Poetry Wales.

== Authors and series ==
Seren Books retains a strong poetry list, and publishes Poetry Wales magazine. It includes some well-known poets such as Dannie Abse, Kathryn Gray, Pascale Petit, Sheenagh Pugh, Carol Rumens and Owen Sheers,. Novelists include Richard Collins, whose debut work, The Land as Viewed from the Sea, was shortlisted for a Whitbread Award in 2004; Lloyd Jones, whose novel Mr Cassini won the English-language Wales Book of the Year award in 2007; and Patrick McGuinness, whose debut novel The Last Hundred Days was longlisted for the Man Booker Prize in 2011. Other writers have included Ivy Alvarez, Ruth Bidgood, Tony Curtis, Dic Edwards, Rhian Edwards, Catherine Fisher, Raymond Garlick, Paul Groves, Richard Gwyn, Paul Henry, Glyn Jones, Mike Jenkins, Alun Lewis, Gary Ley, Christopher Meredith, Francesca Rhydderch, Katherine Stansfield, Edward Thomas, R. S. Thomas and John Tripp.

A classics series has republished important works by Rhys Davies, Caradoc Evans, Margiad Evans and Gwyn Thomas, which were first published by English publishers. Another project invites authors including Fflur Dafydd, Lloyd Jones and Gwyneth Lewis to recreate the Mabinogion in new settings.

Seren Books’ Non-Fiction list is currently focused on experiential and place-based explorations of Wales, with an emphasis on nature, myth, folklore and history, well as Welsh True Crime. Its current Fiction list comprises Welsh Gothic and writing which speaks to contemporary Welsh lives.

== Reception ==
The academic Lisa Sheppard describes Seren, together with Parthian and Cinnamon Press, as "among the foremost publishers of English-language writing in Wales". According to Sheppard, Seren and Parthian are "illuminating Welsh writing in English's past and creating links with the Welsh language tradition in order to claim anglophone literature as part of Wales's literary heritage". The Welsh poet Dannie Abse described Seren on its thirtieth anniversary in 2011 as a "vital element of the Welsh literary scene" and considers it to have contributed to the strength of English-language writing in Wales. The Welsh poet Owen Sheers describes the press in 2011 as "a sign of national and cultural strength" and "a way of allowing a country a voice".

Peter Finch, who has himself been published by Seren, named the late poet Nigel Jenkins as one who disliked Seren's approach. The Welsh poet Tony Curtis said in an interview published in 1997 that "Seren's books look good, and their list is good. Some of it could improve, but that's part of the process"; he criticised the press' marketing for failing to get its books into bookshops.

In 2026, Peter Finch wrote a review of the company, stating: 'Seren has been at the forefront of Welsh publishing since the early 1980s...During that time, more than 40 years from back then to now, the press has revolutionised Welsh publishing. Gone are the old ways. You no longer lob the book at the market and hope as you once did in Wales. You don’t imagine the shops will find out about you through rumour, chance and messaging from the dead. Books do not get coverage simply by existing. For almost half a century this press, Seren Books, has transformed the way you sell specialist Welsh books. It has made its world a professional one.'

Seren Books titles have won and been long- and short-listed for numerous awards include the Costa Book Awards, Forward Prize, Eric Gregory Award and Man Booker. In 2025, the company won the Small Press of the Year for Wales at the British Book Awards (The Nibbies) and were shortlisted for the award in 2026.
