= Martha Sprackland =

British writer (born 1988)

- Sprackland in 2020
- Born: 1988 (age 37–38); Barnstaple, England
- Mother: Jean Sprackland

Martha Sprackland (born 1988) is an English poet, editor and translator from Spanish.

== Background ==
Martha Sprackland was born in Barnstaple in 1988 and grew up in Ainsdale, Merseyside. Her mother is the British poet Jean Sprackland. Her debut collection of poems, Citadel, was published in 2020 by Liverpool University Press, and shortlisted for the Forward Prize for Best First Collection, the Costa Poetry Prize, and the John Pollard Foundation International Poetry Prize. She has also published two pamphlets: Glass As Broken Glass (2017, Rack Press) and Milk Tooth (2018, Rough Trade Books).

Previously assistant poetry editor at Faber & Faber, Sprackland is the co-founder and editor of Offord Road Books, and was previously a co-founding editor of La Errante magazine and Cake magazine. From 2017 to 2021 she was an editor for Poetry London, of which she was acting poetry editor for five issues. She is currently poetry editor for CHEERIO Publishing.

== Bibliography ==
- Glass As Broken Glass (Rack Press, 2017)
- Milk Tooth (Rough Trade Books, 2018)
- Citadel (Liverpool University Press, 2020)

== Awards ==
- 1999: Simon Elvin Award (Foyle Young Poets of the Year Award) winner
- 2003: Foyle Young Poets of the Year Award runner-up
- 2005: Foyle Young Poets of the Year Award winner
- 2014: Eric Gregory Award recipient
- 2019: Michael Marks Pamphlet Award shortlist, Milk Tooth
- 2020: Forward Prize for Best First Collection shortlist, Citadel
- 2020: Costa Prize for Poetry shortlist, Citadel
- 2021: Peirene Stevns Translation Prize shortlist
- 2021: John Pollard International Poetry Prize shortlist, Citadel
