= Gary Ley =

Welsh novelist and sculpture technician

- Born: 1956 (age 69–70); Swansea
- Occupations: writer, sculpture technician
- Known for: Taking Ronnie to the Pictures, Strange Tunnels Disappearing

Gary Ley (born 1956) is a Welsh novelist and sculpture technician. He is based in Rhossili on the Gower Peninsula, near Swansea.

== Biography ==
Born in Swansea in 1956, Gary Ley studied geography at university.

He had a career as a teacher and lecturer, before being involved in the setting up of a sculpture business in 1988.

His first novel, Taking Ronnie to the Pictures, was published in 1998, and is notable for having been a runner-up in Seren’s First Novel Competition. It deals with the subject of child abuse, employing flashbacks and having a narrative that moves between Texas and Wales.

In 2002 Ley published his second novel, Strange Tunnels Disappearing. It is set in the 1980s against the backdrop of the internal conflict in Peru; its main characters are a British aircraft salesman and a Peruvian politics lecturer associated with the Shining Path. The imagined persona of the 19th-century railway builder, Henry Meiggs, features prominently in the novel.

Ley has also had poems published in periodicals.

== Bibliography ==
- Ley, Gary (22 September 1998). Taking Ronnie to the Pictures. Bridgend: Seren. ISBN 1-85411-193-0.
- Ley, Gary (18 April 2002). Strange Tunnels Disappearing. Bridgend: Seren. ISBN 1-85411-302-X.
- Gary has also been a prolific poet over the years, and had some of his poetry published in Welsh periodicals.
