= Rachel Curzon =

English poet (born 1978)

- Born: 1978 (age 47–48); Leeds, England
- Education: University of Oxford
- Occupation: Poet
- Writing career
- Language: English
- Notable work: Faber New Poets 16
- Notable awards: Eric Gregory Award, 2007; Winchester Poetry Prize, 2018

Rachel Curzon (born 1978) is an English poet from Leeds, and lives in North Yorkshire. In 2007, she won an Eric Gregory Award, and her debut pamphlet was published under the Arts Council-supported Faber New Poets scheme in 2016.

== Work ==
Curzon, who after studying English at the University of Oxford has taught at a boys' school in Hampshire, garnered some fame for publication of her debut Faber New Poets 16 with Faber & Faber in 2016. The pamphlet was noted as a debut "with promise and punch" by Guardian.

After being awarded an Eric Gregory Award in 2007, Curzon was the BBC Proms Poetry Competition's over-19 category winner in 2018 for her poem 'Grass Like His Mother', and was shortlisted for the Oxford Poetry Prize 2024, judged by Rachel Long. In 2018, she was also awarded a special prize for the best entry in the Winchester Poetry Prize by a Hampshire-based poet. This was for her poem 'Jardin des Tuileries'. In 2025, Curzon secured the Second Place in The Pre-Raphaelite Society's 2024 Poetry Prize for her poem 'Winter in Dinan'.

Her work has appeared in such publications as the London-based Magma, Poetry London, and The London Magazine, the Worcestershire-based Atrium, the Newcastle-based Mslexia, the Belfast-based The Tangerine, in the Guardian, and in the Norwich-based The Rialto. She has also published poems in The Bridport Anthology, The Tree Line: Poems for Trees, Woods & People (Worple Press, 2017) and Apocalyptic Landscape (Valley Press, 2024), and has read her poetry at a number of events, including the York Festival of Ideas, the Winchester Poetry Festival, and elsewhere.

In 2025, Curzon was one of six New Northern Poets selected for a paid mentoring and development opportunity. Organised by Word Up North in partnership with The University of Leeds Poetry Centre, the New Northern Poets receive 1:1 mentoring from experienced poets from the Centre. In 2026, she was highly commended in the 32nd Bath Flash Fiction Award for her poem 'Hestia / Dionysus', and was shortlisted for The London Magazine Poetry Prize for poem titled 'The Pivot'. The latter was selected by the judges Isabelle Baafi, Dean Browne and Luke Kennard. Later, her poem 'Epithalamion with honesty (lunaria annua)' was awarded the first prize in The Rialto 's 2026 Nature and Place Poetry Competition. In July 2026, she was on the shortlist for Dialect Press 's inaugural DIRT Plantable Poetry Competition.

== Praise for the pamphlet ==
Curzon was selected as a 2015–16 Faber New Poet from a longlist that consisted of sixty manuscripts. The judging panel for the award included Matthew Hollis, then Faber Poetry Editor, Luke Brown on behalf of Arts Council England, and poets Jackie Kay, Helen Taylor, Jack Underwood and Karen McCarthy Woolf.

Writing for the Guardian in 2016, the poet Sean O'Brien called her a good storyteller, capable of imparting "severe chill". Daniel Roy Connelly, writing for the Rome-based Lotus-eater magazine, called it "cohesive" and noted it as traversing "outstanding mental landscapes." Connelly called New Poets 16 a "condensed poetic Bildungsroman" in which the poems are pervaded by "the frigidity of controlled spaces". The poet Martin Malone, writing for The Interpreter's House, pointed that the work "keeps the reader on [their] toes" while allowing ample space for speculation. He noted Curzon as exploring "existential angst" and the results of "powerlessness."

Dundee University Review of the Arts' Jenny Gorrod praised Curzon's poetry for "tak[ing] nothing for granted", pointing at the first poem 'Hydra' as plunging any reader "straight in to an existential crisis", whereas the last poem 'Happy Ending' as "conjur[ing] a bleak image of neglect". She further added that the poet's "voice is urgent and immediate." Laura McCormick Kilbride, writing for The Cambridge Quarterly, observed Curzon's "simplistic diction [as being] understated" and her work "striking when it is less particular" in approach, such as when moving towards the "questions of motherhood, personhood, and ownership". In another review, poet Alison Brackenbury noted that the poems in the pamphlet "are haunted by music", pointing out that "Curzon's skilful rhythms are seductive" and are capable of "mov[ing] readers from terror into lullaby". Gorrod, in her review, also noted the appearance of "[u]nusual musical instruments" in Curzon's debut pamphlet.

== Books ==
- Faber New Poets 16 (Faber, 2016) ISBN 9780571330423

== Awards ==
- 2007: Eric Gregory Award
- 2007: Runner-up, Bridport Prize Competition
- 2018: BBC Proms Poetry Competition
- 2018: Winchester Poetry Prize, for 'Jardin des Tuileries'
- 2023: Highly Commended, 2023 Stanza Poetry Competition, for 'Cusp'
- 2024: Shortlisted, Oxford Poetry Prize
- 2025: Second Place, The Pre-Raphaelite Society 2024 Poetry Prize, for 'Winter in Dinan'
- 2025: First Place, 2025 Poetry London Prize, for 'There are enough poems about birds, and here is another one'
- 2026: Highly Commended, 32nd Bath Flash Fiction Award, for 'Hestia / Dionysus'
- 2026: Shortlisted, The London Magazine Poetry Prize 2026, for 'The Pivot'
- 2026: First Prize, The Rialto Nature and Place Poetry Competition 2026, for 'Epithalamion with honesty (lunaria annua)'
- 2026: Shortlisted, DIRT Plantable Poetry Competition
