= The Road to Omaha =

1992 novel by Robert Ludlum

- The Road to Omaha first edition cover.
- Author: Robert Ludlum
- Language: English
- Genre: Thriller
- Publisher: Random House
- Publication date: February 8, 1992
- Publication place: United States
- Media type: Print (hardback & paperback)
- Pages: 487 pp (first edition)
- ISBN: 0-394-57329-3
- OCLC: 24010263
- Dewey Decimal: 813/.54 20
- LC Class: PS3562.U26 R63 1992
- Preceded by: The Road to Gandolfo

The Road to Omaha is a novel by Robert Ludlum published in 1992. It is a sequel to his earlier book The Road to Gandolfo. Both are comedic thrillers concerning Army lawyer Sam Devereaux, who gets caught up in the schemes of General MacKenzie "The Hawk" Hawkins. The Hawk is seeking revenge after being unfairly drummed out of the United States Army at the start of the first book.

While the earlier novel was originally published under the pseudonym Michael Shepherd, The Road to Omaha was released under Ludlum's name.

== Plot introduction ==
Several years after the events of The Road to Gandolfo, the Hawk has discovered a long-forgotten treaty between the US government and a tribe of Native Americans. This treaty granted the tribe a vast area of land that has since become Omaha, Nebraska, and includes the home of the Strategic Air Command at Offutt Air Base. Posing as a member of the tribe, the Hawk plans to bring suit against the United States and force it to give the land to the tribe. To further this goal, he ropes Devereaux (now retired from the military) into representing the tribe in court.

== Publication history ==
- 1992, US, Random House ISBN 0-394-57329-3, Pub date February 8, 1992, Hardback
- 1993, US, Bantam ISBN 0-553-56044-1, Pub date January 1, 1993, Paperback
- 1992, UK, HarperCollins ISBN 0-246-13546-8 Pub date March 19, 1992, Hardback
- 1992, UK, HarperCollins ISBN 0-553-18092-4, Pub date November 19, 1992, Paperback
