= Pippa Little =

Scottish poet and translator

- Born: Tanzania
- Occupations: Poet, Translator

Academic background
- Education: Queen Mary University of London

Academic work
- Institutions: Newcastle University

Pippa Little is a Scottish poet, reviewer, translator, and editor. She has published five poetry collections and her work has appeared in several anthologies, including Oxford Poets 2010 and Best British Poetry 2011.

== Biography ==
Pippa Little was born in Tanzania, East Africa and was raised in St. Andrews, Scotland. She has a PhD in contemporary women’s poetry from Queen Mary University of London. Her early career was in publishing as a sub-editor and staff writer. Little has reviewed poetry for literary journals and has published translations of Spanish and Hungarian poetry.

Her first poetry collection, ‘’The Spar Box’’, came out in 2006 and was the UK Poetry Book Society’s (PBS) pamphlet choice.

Little is winner of the Eric Gregory Award (1985), the Andrew Waterhouse Award (2009), Norman MacCaig Centenary Poetry Prize(2010), and the joint winner of the University of Glasgow's James McCash Scots Poetry Competition (2012).

In 2016, Little was named one of 20 recipients of the Best Scottish Poems Awards. She is currently a Royal Literary Fund Fellow at Newcastle University, in Northumberland, England. Her 2017 collection Twist was described by Carolyn Forché as 'an imaginarium of the sensed world, its lyric artistry born of precise attention to its particulars. Little is both naturalist and secular mystic, with an ear to the air of language. These are poems that tunnel into the open of later life and I find deep wisdom in them'.

== Poetry collections ==
- Time Begins to Hurt (2022)
- Twist (2017)
- Our Lady of Iguanas (2016)
- Overwintering (2012)
- The Snow Globe (2011)
- Foray (2009)

In Anthology

- Ghost Fishing: An Eco-Justice Poetry Anthology (University of Georgia Press, 2018)

== See also ==
- Poetry of Scotland
- Scottish Poetry Library
- Poetry Foundation
