= Michael McKimm =

Northern Irish poet (born 1983)

Michael McKimm (born 1983) is a poet from Northern Ireland. His debut collection of poetry is Still This Need (Heaventree Press, 2009).

== Early years and education ==
McKimm was born in Belfast but lived from the age of seven on the north coast of County Antrim, near the Giant's Causeway and the town of Bushmills. He attended Dunseverick Primary School and Coleraine Academical Institution, in Coleraine, County Londonderry, before moving to England to study English Literature and Creative Writing at the University of Warwick.

== Literary career ==
McKimm received an Eric Gregory Award from the Society of Authors in 2007, awarded to the best poets in the UK under the age of 30. His poetry has appeared in many journals in the UK, including Horizon Review, Magma, Oxford Poetry, PN Review and The Warwick Review. His work is included in The Best of Irish Poetry 2010 (edited by Matthew Sweeney) and also in Dossier Journal (New York) in a collaborative project with his brother Alastair McKimm. In 2010 he was invited to the International Writing Program at the University of Iowa.
