= Grahame Davies =

British writer (born 1964)

Grahame Davies CVO
- Born: 1964 (age 61–62); Coedpoeth, Wales
- Education: Anglia Ruskin University; Cardiff University
- Occupations: poet, author, librettist, editor and literary critic, former journalist and courtier
- Website: grahamedavies.com

Grahame Clive Davies CVO (born 1964) is a Welsh poet, author, editor, librettist, literary critic and former journalist and courtier. He was brought up in the former coal mining village of Coedpoeth near Wrexham in north east Wales.

== Education ==
After gaining a degree in English Literature at Anglia Ruskin University, Cambridge, he qualified as a journalist with the Thomson Organisation at Newcastle-upon-Tyne. In 1997, he was awarded a doctorate by the University of Wales for his study, written in Welsh, of the work of R. S. Thomas, Saunders Lewis, T.S. Eliot and Simone Weil, whom he identified as part of an anti-modern trend in Western culture in the 20th Century.

== Employment ==
He worked as a newspaper journalist from 1986-1992, and for the BBC from 1992-2012, in various roles in television current affairs, new media and policy, becoming Newsgathering Editor for BBC Cymru Wales. His newspaper, television and new media work brought him a number of Welsh and industry awards.

In 2012, he became a Member of the Royal Household as Assistant Private Secretary to The Prince of Wales, later King Charles III, becoming Deputy Private Secretary in 2018, and leaving in October 2023 to become Director of Mission and Strategy for the Church in Wales.

== Literary Career ==
He is the author of 19 books in Welsh and English including poetry, psychogeography, novels, and intercultural studies.

As a librettist, he has carried out many major commissions for classical composers including Sir Karl Jenkins, Paul Mealor, Sarah Class, Debbie Wiseman, Tom Harrold, Roderick Williams, Peter Boyer, Nigel Hess and Joanna Gill. For the 2023 coronation of Charles III, Davies' text Sacred Fire was set to a composition by Sarah Class and performed by South African soprano Pretty Yende. He also provided the Welsh words for the Veni Creator Spiritus, and the lyrics for the Song of Thanksgiving and Dedication, by Joanna Gill for the Honours of Scotland service on July 5.

As a Welsh language poet, he is the author of three solo volumes. In 1997, his first volume, Adennill Tir (Barddas), a book arising from the 11 years he spent in Merthyr Tydfil in the south Wales Valleys, won the Harri Webb Memorial Prize. In 2001, his second volume, Cadwyni Rhyddid (Barddas), appeared. It quickly went to a second edition and won the Wales Arts Council's 2002 Book of the Year award at the Hay on Wye Festival of Literature, together with a prize of £3,000. His third volume, Achos, appeared from Barddas in 2005.

As an English language poet, a bilingual volume of poetry, Ffiniau/Borders, jointly with Elin ap Hywel, appeared from Gomer press in 2002, His first solo volume in English, Lightning Beneath the Sea, appeared from Seren in 2012, and his second, A Darker Way, also from Seren in 2024. His poem 'Departed', from Lightning Beneath the Sea, was Poem of the Week in The Guardian in 2012, and his poem 'The Journalist', from A Darker Way, was Poem of the Week in 2024.

As an academic, in 1999, his study of Wales and the anti-modern movement, Sefyll yn y Bwlch (University of Wales Press, 1999), the product of his doctorate, went "straight to the front rank of criticism of our day," according to the critic Dr Dafydd Glyn Jones (Barn), and was described as "a signal book" by the critic Dr Angharad Price (New Welsh Review). Interfaith relations have been one of his major specialisms. In 2002, Seren Press published his study, The Chosen People, detailing the relationship of the Welsh and the Jewish people as reflected in literature. A follow-up study on Wales and Islam, The Dragon and the Crescent, appeared from Seren in 2011.

As a novelist, his first novel Rhaid i Bopeth Newid, published by Gomer in 2004, was longlisted for the £10,000 Book of the Year prize, 2005, and was described by Lord Dafydd Elis-Thomas in the periodical Taliesin as 'the first post-national novel.' In 2007, revised and expanded, it appeared in English as Everything Must Change.

As a psychogeographer, his Real Wrexham, appeared in 2007 from Seren Books, and Real Cambridge in 2021, also from Seren. As an editor and anthologist, in 2000, he co-edited Oxygen (Seren), a bilingual anthology of Welsh poets aged under 45. and he has edited several anthologies of Welsh literature in other languages, including, in 2002, a 160-page edition of the Bulgarian literary magazine Plamak (“Flame”), and in 2004 and 2005 respectively, selections of Welsh poetry in Asturian and Galician translations as Nel país del borrina (The Country of the Clouds). and No país de la brétema from VTP Editorial. His work as anthologist has also included The Big Book of Cardiff (edited with Peter Finch) (Seren Press, 2005), and a collection of work by and about refugees and asylum seekers, Gwyl Y Blaidd: The Festival of the Wolf (co-editor) (Parthian, 2006).

He was a board member of the Welsh Academi from 2005-2011 and Welsh language editor of Poetry Wales magazine for several years until 2002. His work has been widely translated and anthologised, appearing in publications such as The Times, The Times Literary Supplement, Poetry London, the Literary Review in America, and the Yearbook of Welsh Writing in English.

He is a frequent contributor of articles and reviews to journals, and his poetry is on the syllabus for school pupils in Wales. He travels internationally as a reader and lecturer. He was Vice President of Goodenough College in London and an Honorary Research Fellow in Cardiff University.

== Selected publications ==
- A Darker Way (Seren Press, 2024)
- Real Cambridge (Seren Press, 2021)
- Alcemi Dwr / Alchemy of Water (Gwasg Gomer, 2013)
- Lightning Beneath the Sea (Seren Press, 2012)
- The Dragon and the Crescent (Seren Press, 2011)
- Real Wrexham (Seren Press, 2007)
- Everything Must Change (Seren Press, 2007)
- Achos (Cyhoeddiadau Barddas, 2005)
- Rhaid i Bopeth Newid (Gwasg Gomer, 2004)
- Cadwyni Rhyddid (Cyhoeddiadau Barddas, 2002)
- Meddwl a’r Dychymyg Cymreig, Y: Sefyll yn y Bwlch: Cymru a’r Mudiad Gwrth-Fodern – Astudiaeth o Waith T.S. Eliot, Simone Weil, Saunders Lewis ac R.S. Thomas (University of Wales Press, 1999)
- Adennill Tir (Cyhoeddiadau Barddas, 1997)

Contributed to:

- Oxygen – Beirdd Newydd o Gymru / New Poets from Wales (editor with Amy Wack) (Seren Press, 2000)
- Trosiadau / Translations: Ffiniau / Borders (with Elin ap Hywel) (Gwasg Gomer, 2002)
- The Chosen People – Wales and the Jews (editor) (Seren Press, 2002)
- The Big Book of Cardiff (edited with Peter Finch) (Seren Press, 2005)
- Gwyl Y Blaidd: The Festival of the Wolf (co-editor) (Parthian, 2006)
- Poems of Love and Longing (Pont, 2008)
- 25/25 Vision. Welsh Horizons across 50 years (Institute of Welsh Affairs 2012)
- Poems for R.S. A Centenary Celebration (Hay Festival Press 2013)
- Encounters with R.S. (H'mm Foundation, 2013)
- Fesul Gair (Gomer, 2014)
- Dodos and Dragons (Aberystwyth University, 2016)
- The Old Red Tongue, (Francis Boutle, 2017)
- Argyfwng Hunaniaeth a Chred; Ysgrifau ar Athroniaeth J.R.Jones (Y Lolfa, 2017)
- Poems from Cardiff (Seren, 2019)
- Arrival at Elsewhere (Against the Grain, 2020)
- Where the Birds Sing Our Names, an anthology for Ty Hafan, ed. Tony Curtis (Seren, 2021).
- 100 Poems to Save the Earth, eds Zoe Brigley and Kristian Evans, (Seren, 2021)

== Awards ==
- 2026: Royal Philharmonic Society Award (Nomination)
- 2025: Ivor Novello Awards (Nomination)
- 2025: Freedom of the City of London
- 2025: Freeman of the Worshipful Company of Goldsmiths
- 2024: Honorary Fellow of the Royal Welsh College of Music and Drama.
- 2023 Commander of the Royal Victorian Order (CVO), 2023 Special Honours
- 2023 Honorary Professor of Practice, University of Wales Trinity St David
- 2023 Honorary Doctor of Letters, University of Aberdeen
- 2022 Vers Libre prize, National Eisteddfod of Wales
- 2020 Lieutenant of the Royal Victorian Order (LVO), 2020 Birthday Honours
- 2017 Poem Suitable for Song prize. National Eisteddfod of Wales
- 2016 Sonnet prize, National Eisteddfod of Wales
- 2011 Literature Wales Bursary
- 2010 Honorary D.Litt. Anglia Ruskin University
- 2009 Ruth Howarth Literature Award
- 2008 Honorary Research Fellowship, Cardiff University
- 2007 Academi Bursary Award (second award)
- 2004 Cerdd Deyrnged, National Eisteddfod of Wales
- 2004 Longlist for Book of the Year
- 2004 Fellowship of Goodenough College, London
- 2004 Academi Bursary Award
- 2001 Winner, Stomp, National Eisteddfod of Wales
- 2002 Welsh Arts Council Book of the Year
- 1998 Welsh Arts Council Writer's Bursary Award
- 1997 Harri Webb Memorial Poetry Prize
- 1994 Vers Libre Prize at the National Eisteddfod of Wales

== Judge ==
- 2025: Recitation competitions at National Eisteddfod
- 2015: Undercurrents Festival, Caerphilly county.
- 2014: Undercurrents Festival, Caerphilly county.
- 2014: Dylan Thomas International Poetry Award.
- 2011: Literature Medal at National Eisteddfod.
- 2011: Chair competition (learners) at National Eisteddfod.
- 2007: John Tripp Award for Spoken Poetry, Cardiff round.
- 2007: Wrexham Festival Poetry Competition, Welsh and English.
- 2006: Literature Medal at National Eisteddfod.
- 2005: Bafta Cymru judging panel: Best Magazine/Feature Programme
- 2005: Wrexham Festival Poetry Competition, Welsh and English.
- 2004: Chair of Welsh-language judging panel for Book of the Year Award.
- 2003: John Tripp Award for Spoken Poetry
- 2002: Eisteddfod Rhyng-Golegol, Free verse competitions.
