= John Pook =

British poet (born 1942)

John Barrie Pook (born 2 February 1942) is a British poet.

John Pook was born at Neath in South Wales, but grew up in Gowerton, near Swansea, and attended Gowerton Boys Grammar School. He afterwards took master's degrees, in English at Queens' College, Cambridge University (1964), and in Linguistics at Bangor University.

He has worked as an editor for an airline reservation company, and lives in the South of France. He has contributed to many poetry magazines and anthologies, and has published two collections of his verse – That Cornish Facing Door published by Gomer Press ISBN 0850883172(1975) and Needing the Experience (2008).

In 1971, Pook won the Eric Gregory Award for Poetry.
