= Mortal Stakes =

1975 novel by Robert B. Parker

- First Edition
- Author: Robert B. Parker
- Language: English
- Series: Spenser
- Genre: Detective novel
- Publisher: Houghton Mifflin
- Publication date: 1975
- Media type: Print (Paperback)
- Pages: 172 pp
- ISBN: 0-395-21969-8
- OCLC: 1530701
- Dewey Decimal: 813/.5/4
- LC Class: PZ4.P244 Mo PS3566.A686
- Preceded by: God Save the Child
- Followed by: Promised Land

Mortal Stakes is the third Spenser novel by Robert B. Parker, first published in 1975. The story centers on the Boston private eye being hired by the Red Sox to find out if their lead pitcher, Marty Rabb, is on the take. The investigation quickly takes him into a deeper, and more dangerous, blackmail plot involving pimps, a high class madam, and a vicious shylock.

Marty Rabb's wife, Linda Rabb, lived a secret life as a prostitute and made a pornographic film that is the backbone of the blackmail issue. Spenser must deal with the shylock, Frank Doerr, and his huge bodyguard before he can deal with the actual blackmailer (which turns out to be the Red Sox broadcaster, Bucky Maynard).

This book explains why Susan Silverman became his primary love interest instead of Brenda Loring. Spenser explains that he can talk to Susan about hard problems in a way that he can't with Brenda.

== Literary significance and criticism ==
"Despite appearances at the beginning, this tense and well-plotted story is not about baseball. Spenser ... finds two couples -- a blackmailer and his parasite and a man and wife (the ballplayer ménage) with whom he becomes friendly. These four principals are admirably done; the slut's transgression is not treated in the routine manner that might have been expected; and the final, violent settlement of accounts by Spenser is first-rate."
