= Anthony Anaxagorou =

British born poet and writer

Anthony Anaxagorou FRSL
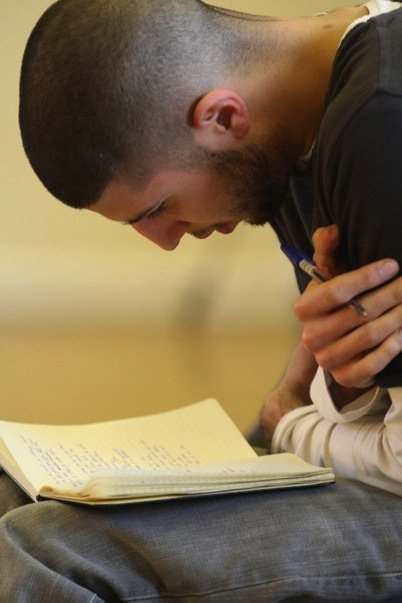
- Anaxagorou in 2010
- Born: March 1983 (age 43); London, England, UK
- Occupations: Poet, writer, educator
- Writing career
- Notable awards: Mayor of London's Poetry Slam, 2002; Groucho Maverick Award, 2015; Ondaatje Prize, 2023
- Website: anthonyanaxagorou.com

Anthony Anaxagorou FRSL is a British-born Cypriot poet, writer, publisher and educator.

== Early life ==
Anthony Anaxagorou is of Cypriot origin. His mother is from Nicosia and his father from Famagusta. Anaxagorou grew up in North London and attended Queen Elizabeth's School, Barnet.

== Literary career ==
In 2002, Anaxagorou won the inaugural Mayor of London's Respect Poetry Slam (now known as SLAMbassadors UK, the national youth slam championship). In 2003, he appeared alongside fellow poet Kae Tempest on Young Nation, presented by Richard Blackwood, where he performed a number of poems themed around social issues relating to young people. After an extended break from poetry, Anaxagorou began self-publishing in 2008. In 2010, he toured the UK supporting MOBO-winning artist Akala on the DoubleThink tour.

In 2015, Anaxagorou was awarded the 2015 Groucho Maverick Award for his poetry and fiction.

His second poetry collection, After the Formalities (Penned in the Margins, 2019), was shortlisted for the T. S. Eliot Prize 2019. The collection was a Poetry Book Society Recommendation and was a Guardian poetry book of the year. In 2019, he was made an honorary lecturer of the University of Roehampton.

In 2020, he published How To... Write It with Merky Books, a practical guide combining writing advice, craft and memoir.

His poetry collection Heritage Aesthetics won the 2023 Ondaatje Prize.

In 2023 Anaxagorou was elected as a Fellow of the Royal Society of Literature.

== Out-Spoken and Out-Spoken Press ==
In 2012, Anaxagorou founded Out-Spoken, a monthly poetry and live music night, where he remains Artistic Director. In 2019, Out-Spoken started a long-term residency at London's Southbank Centre. In 2015, he founded Out-Spoken Press, an independent publisher of poetry and critical writing that has published titles from authors including Raymond Antrobus, Sabrina Mahfouz, Fran Lock, Mukahang Limbu and Richard Georges. The press has awarded an annual Out-Spoken Prize for Poetry since 2015. There are winners in several categories (in 2023 these were "Page poetry", "Poetry in film" and "Performance poetry"), and an overall winner.

== Literary works ==
- A Difficult Place To Be Human – 2012
- The Blink That Killed The Eye (Jacaranda, 2014)
- It Will Come To You EP - 2013
- Heterogeneous: New and Selected Poems (Out-Spoken Press, 2016)
- After the Formalities (Penned in the Margins, 2019)
- How To... Write It (Merky Books, 2020)
- Heritage Aesthetics (Granta Poetry, 2022)
