= Ahren Warner =

British poet (born 1986)

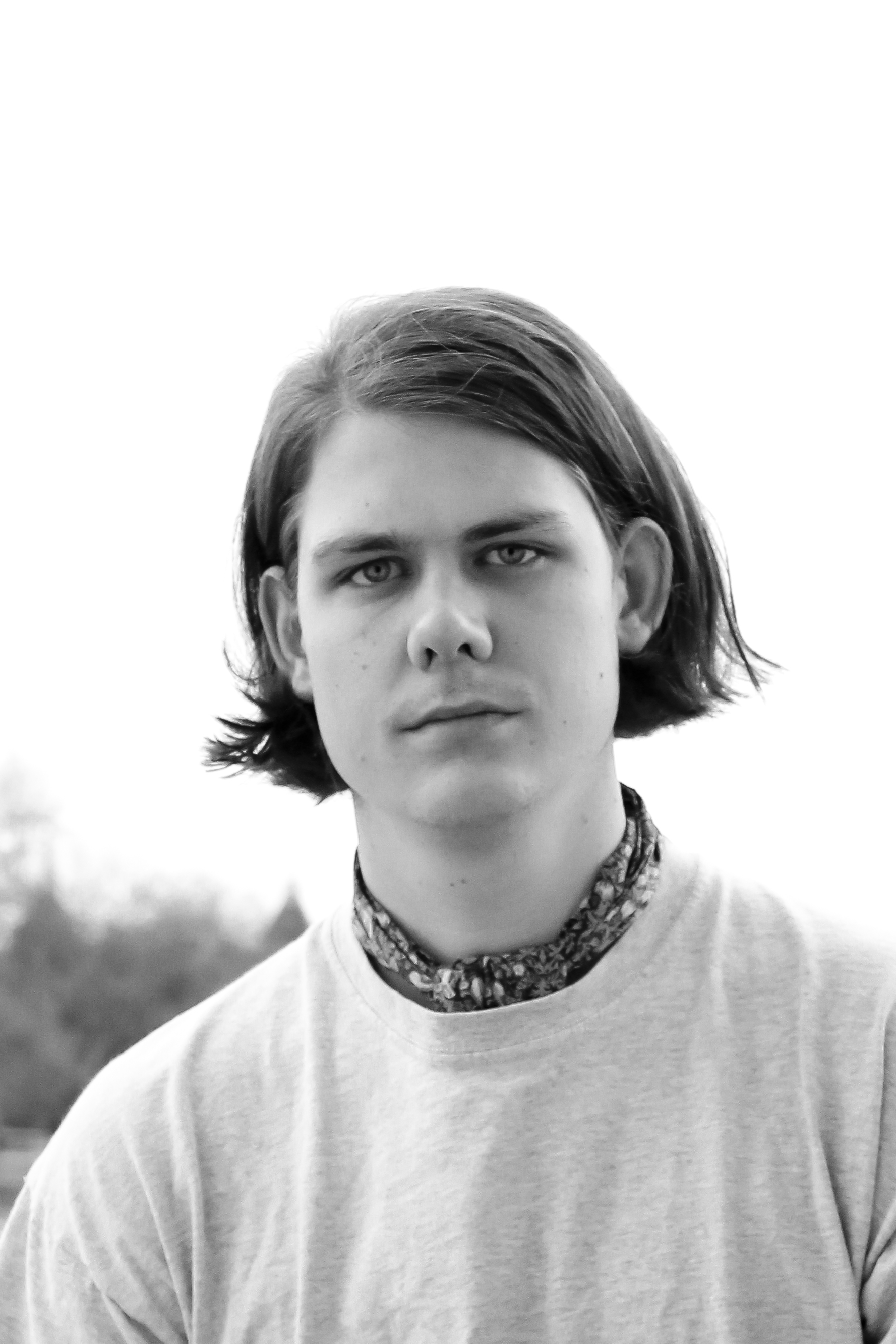
- Ahren Warner. Author Photo.
- Born: 1986 (age 39–40); Oxford, England
- Occupation: Poet
- Writing career
- Period: 2007–present
- Website: www.ahrenwarner.com

Ahren Warner (born 1986) is a British poet. He grew up in Lincolnshire before moving to London, then Paris. His first collection of poetry, Confer (Bloodaxe, 2011), was a Poetry Book Society Recommendation and was shortlisted for the Forward Prize for Best First Collection. His second collection, Pretty (Bloodaxe, 2013) was also a Poetry Book Society Recommendation.

His most recent collections are Hello. Your promise has been extracted (Bloodaxe, 2017) and The sea is spread and cleaved and furled (Prototype, 2020), a book-length sequence of poems and moving-image work. These earned him an Arts Foundation Fellowship and selection for Bloomberg New Contemporaries 2020.

Warner's poems appear in several major anthologies, including London: A History in Verse (Harvard University Press, 2012) and Identity Parade: New British and Irish Poets (Bloodaxe, 2010). From 2013 to 2019, he was the Poetry Editor of Poetry London.

He has a PhD from Queen Mary, University of London, and is Senior Lecturer at Loughborough University School of Design and Creative Arts.
