= Poetry London =

Literary periodical based in London

Poetry London is a literary periodical based in London. Published three times a year, it features poems, reviews, and other articles.

== Profile ==
Adopting the title of an earlier bimonthly publication which ran from 1939 to 1951, Poetry London was founded in 1988 as a listings magazine. It now publishes poems from Britain and around the world, some originally written in English and some in English translation.

The current head of the editorial team is André Naffis-Sahely. Previous poetry editors have included Colette Bryce, Pascale Petit, Maurice Riordan, Ahren Warner and Martha Sprackland.

== The Poetry London Prize ==
The magazine runs a major international poetry competition each year, in which the winner receives the Poetry London Prize for a single outstanding poem. There are also second and third prizes. All entries are single poems written in English that have not have yet been published. The first prize is currently £5000. Winners have included Liz Berry, Richard Scott, and Romalyn Ante.

Year	Winner	Title of Poem
2012	Liz Berry	"Bird"
2013	Niall Campbell	"The Letter Always Arrives at its Destination"
2014	Jon Stone	"Nightjar"
2015	Geraldine Clarkson	"His Wife in the Corner"
2016	Jon Stone	"The Self-Made Man"
2017	Richard Scott	"Crocodile"
2018	Romalyn Ante	"Names"
2019	Roger Bloor	"The Ghost of Molly Leigh Pleads, Yes Cries for Exemplarie Justice Against the Arbitrarie, Un-exampled Injustice of Her Accusers"
2020	Eleanor Penny	"Winter, a biography"
2021	Nick Makoha	"Hollywood Africans"
2025	Rachel Curzon	"There are enough poems about birds, and here is another one"

== Contributors ==
Contributors have included some of the best-known poets writing in the English language. But the magazine operates an open submissions policy, and every issue carries both established and emerging poets.

Each issue also has a cover portrait of one of the poets whose work it features. Past cover poets have included Fred D'Aguiar, Carol Ann Duffy, Philip Gross, Helen Farish and Julia Copus.
