= John Birtwhistle =

English poet

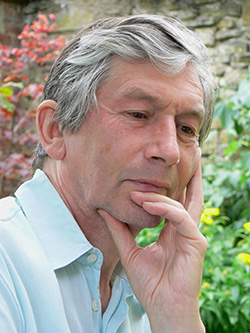
- Born: John Birtwhistle; 28 June 1946; Scunthorpe, Lincolnshire, England
- Notable work: The Plumber's Gift; Eventualities; In The Event

John Birtwhistle (born 1946) is an English poet published by Carcanet Press. His libretto for David Blake’s opera The Plumber’s Gift (1989) was staged by English National Opera at the London Coliseum and broadcast on BBC Radio 3.

== Career ==
Birtwhistle won an Eric Gregory Award from the Society of Authors in 1975. His poetry has been recognized by an Arts Council bursary, an Arts Council creative writing fellowship (1976–78), a writing fellowship at the University of Southampton (1978–80) and a Poetry Book Society recommendation for Our Worst Suspicions (1985).

Birtwhistle has had three concert libretti set and performed. Some of his early poems were translated by Ștefan Augustin Doinaș and published in Romanian. His 1996 libretto for The Fabulous Adventures of Alexander the Great by composer David Blake was translated into Greek.

From 1980 to 1992, Birtwhistle was a Lecturer in English at the University of York, teaching mainly the seventeenth century and Romantic periods. He has written on Goethe’s Italian Journey and on Humphry Davy. He has edited and annotated John Clare's essay Popularity in Authorship. From 2012 to 2017, he was a literary contributor and eventually an Associate Editor of the quarterly BMJ Supportive & Palliative Care. Birtwhistle is married to a Consultant Anaesthetist and since 1992 he has lived in Sheffield with his family.

== Critical reception ==
Birtwhistle has been described by Ian Hughes as a "master craftsman." Dick Davis wrote that Birtwhistle’s poems “celebrate the vulnerable and immediate.” Dennis O’Driscoll commented in Hibernia that "a sweeping imagination ranges over past and future, pastoral and urban themes" and John Heath-Stubbs described Birtwhistle as "an ambitious and original poet, not afraid to take chances", singling out a group of poems on Connemara as "altogether admirable for their exact and loving observation." Peter Jay wrote that Birtwhistle "produces a dazzling array of poems on a range of historical, political and personal subjects. These lucid, witty, tender poems, by turns serious and comic, are full of felicitous surprises and unexpected turns of imagination." Poet Carol Rumens wrote in The Guardian that "[Birtwhistle's] work is consistently both shaped and calm, and energised by the various tides it travels."

== Bibliography ==
- The Conversion to Oil of the Lots Road London Transport Power Station, and Other Poems (London: Anvil Press Poetry in association with Routledge & Kegan Paul, 1972) ISBN 0-900977-36-1
- Vision of Wat Tyler (With etchings and calligraphy by Graham Clarke. Boughton Monchelsea, Kent: Ebenezer Press, 1972) ISBN 0950235709
- Haysaving: a Connemara Journal (Maidstone/Boughton Monchelsea, Kent: Trembling Hand Press/Ebenezer Press, 1975) ISBN 0-905038-00-2
- Tidal Models (London: Anvil Press Poetry in association with Rex Collings, 1980) ISBN 0-85646-052-4
- Our Worst Suspicions (London: Anvil Press Poetry, 1985) ISBN 0-85646-131-8.
- The Plumber's Gift. Opera in Two Acts (Libretto for music by David Blake. London: Novello, 1988)
- A Selection of Poems (London: Anvil Press Poetry, 1989) ISBN 0-85646-215-2
- The Griffin's Tale. Legend for Baritone and Orchestra (Libretto for music by David Blake. York: University of York Music Press, 1994) ISMN M570200771
- The Fabulous Adventures of Alexander the Great (Libretto for music by David Blake. York: University of York Music Press, 1996) ISMN 570200733
- Rings of Jade. Poems from the Prison Diaries of Ho Chi Minh (Song cycle for music for medium voice and orchestra by David Blake. York: University of York Music Press, 2005) ISMN M570208357
- A Swallow (Song for soprano set by David Blake. York: University of York Music Press, 2008) ISMN M570360437; David Blake, Songs and Epigrams for Voice and Piano (York: University of York Music Press, 2016) ASIN B07WR3B82C
- Eventualities (London: Anvil Press Poetry, 2013) ISBN 978-0-85646-451-5
- In the Event (Manchester: Carcanet Press, 2020) ISBN 978-1-78410-993-6
- Partial Shade: Poems New & Selected (Manchester: Carcanet Press, 2023) ISBN 978-1-80017-323-1
