= Alasdair Paterson =

- Born: Edinburgh, Scotland
- Occupations: Poet and academic librarian (retired)

Alasdair Talbert Paterson is a Scottish poet and retired academic librarian. He won an Eric Gregory Award for poetry in 1975 and published several collections before taking a twenty-year break from publication. In his career as a librarian he worked in the universities of Liverpool, Cork and Sheffield, and he held the post of University Librarian at Exeter University. In his last year at Exeter he was also Acting Director of Computing Services. After retirement he resumed publishing with On the governing of empires in 2010.

Paterson was born in Edinburgh, and studied at the universities of Edinburgh and Sheffield. He has travelled extensively and was involved in several academic projects in Eastern Europe during his career, co-ordinating the E-URALS and KNOWLEDGE projects for TEMPUS in the early 2000s and co-presenting a 2004 seminar series on Innovations in European academic libraries: Issues and contexts in Warsaw. He now lives in Exeter.

== Selected publications ==
- My my my life (2021, Shearsman, ISBN 978-1848617520
- Silent years (2017, Flarestack Poets, ISBN 978-1906480448
- Elsewhere or Thereabouts (2014, Shearsman, ISBN 978-1848613270)
- In arcadia (2011, Oystercatcher Press, ISBN 978-1905885428)
- Brumaire and Later (2010, Flarestack Poets, ISBN 978-1906480264)
- On the governing of empires (2010, Shearsman, ISBN 978-1848611160)
- Brief Lives (1987, Oasis Books, ISBN 978-0903375696)
- Paterson, Alasdair Talbert (1985). Flying to Iceland. Windows. ISBN 9780907950226. (1985, Windows Project, ISBN 978-0907950226)
- The Floating World: Selected Poems, 1973-82 (1984, Pig Press, ISBN 978-0903997867)
- Topiary (1982, Pig Press, ISBN 978-0903997706)
- Alps (1981, Oasis Books, ISBN 978-0903375542)
- Terra Nova (1979, Interim Press, ISBN 978-0904675122)
- Poems for Douanier Rousseau (1975, Glasshouse Press)
