= Val Warner =

British poet (1946–2020)

Valerie Margaret Warner
- Born: January 15, 1946; Harrow, London, England
- Died: October 10, 2020 (aged 74); Hackney, London, England
- Education: Somerville College, Oxford
- Occupations: Poet; editor; translator

Val Warner was a poet, editor and translator who was best known for helping to increase the salience of poet Charlotte Mew's work.

Warner was the only child of two schoolteachers and grew up in Harrow, London. She went on to study modern history at Somerville College, Oxford.

She initially found work as a school librarian and freelance copy-editor before holding the posts of Creative Writing Fellow at Swansea University and Writer-in-Residence at the University of Dundee.

As well as publishing her own poetry collections, Warner also published a translation of The Centenary Corbière by Tristan Corbière in 1975 and an edition of Charlotte Mew's collected poems and prose in 1981. Along with other scholarly work in the 1980s, this collection helped in renewing wider interest in Mew's work.

Warner became increasingly reclusive in the last years of her life. She sold a house in Harrow that she had inherited from her parents and then subsequently moved to a late-Victorian terraced house in Hackney where she continued to live for the rest of her life. The house lacked running water, heating and cooking facilities. She survived on a diet of raw onions, soya mince and chickpeas.

Her body was discovered after a forced entry into her house by police on 10 October 2020, due to a concerned friend contacting them about a lack of a communication with her. She had died alone and no ascertainable cause of death was reported by the coroner after an autopsy was conducted in November 2020.

== Awards and recognition ==
Warner received the Eric Gregory Award in 1975 and was elected a Fellow of the Royal Society of Literature in 1998.

== Bibliography ==
- Warner, Val (1971). These Yellow Photos. Carcanet Press. ISBN 9780902145269.
- Warner, Val (1973). Under The Penthouse. Carcanet Press. ISBN 9780902145870.
- Mew, Charlotte (1982). Warner, Val (ed.). Charlotte Mew: Collected Poems and Prose. Virago Press. ISBN 9780860682233.
- Warner, Val (1986). Before Lunch. Carcanet Press. ISBN 9780856356292.
- Warner, Val (1998). Tooting Idyll. Carcanet Press. ISBN 9781857543339.
- Mew, Charlotte (2003). Warner, Val (ed.). Collected Poems and Selected Prose of Charlotte Mew. Routledge. ISBN 9780415967570.
- Corbiere, Tristan; Warner, Val (2006). The Centenary Corbière. Carcanet Press. ISBN 9781857547115.
