= Rachel Dawson (author) =

Author

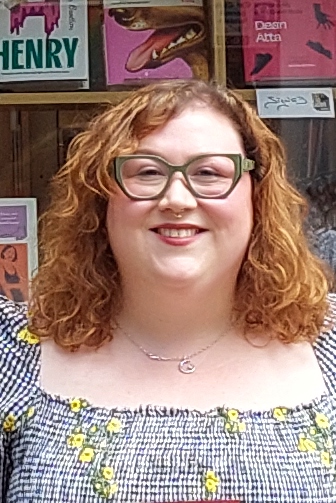
- Dawson in 2024
- Occupation: Novelist
- Subject: Romance
- Notable works: Neon Roses

Website
- racheldawson.cymru/about

Rachel Dawson is a lesbian author based in Cardiff. Her debut novel, Neon Roses, was published in 2023.

== Personal life ==
Dawson was born in Swansea and studied English Literature at Cardiff University, graduating in 2010. After graduating she struggled with writing, explaining that the course had knocked her confidence. In 2012, she joined Roath Writers and began writing poetry.

She is a founding member of the Songbirds Choir, a community choir for LGBTQ+ women, transgender people, and nonbinary people. With the choir Dawson has performed at the Senedd and Pride Cymru.

Outside of writing, Dawson has previously worked at a women's refuge and at Common/Wealth theatre in Cardiff. She currently lives in Cardiff with her wife.

== Writing ==
In 2020, she was awarded a Literature Wales bursary and was mentored by Rebecca F. John. It was during this time she began writing her debut novel.

Dawson's debut novel, Neon Roses, was published by John Murray Press in May 2023. It was shortlisted for several awards including the Wales Book of the Year, the Polari Prize, and the Betty Trask Prize. The book is a queer coming of age story, focusing on the protagonist Eluned Hughes. Set in South Wales in the 1980s, it touches on the 1984–1985 United Kingdom miners' strikes, and the Lesbians and Gays Support the Miners fundraising efforts.

The book was inspired by the Pride (2014), with Dawson's research sources including Bishopsgate Archives, the People's History Museum, and interviews with Lisa Power and Dawson's own family members.

In April 2024, she was named as one of the Hay Festival Writers at Work. She became a director of Seren Books in July 2024. In September 2024 Literature Wales announced Dawson would be providing mentoring as part of their Representing Wales programme. She also began teaching short courses at Cardiff University in novel writing and writing romance.

Dawson was named on Diva Magazine's 2025 Power List and Wales Online's 2024 Pinc List.
