= The Road to Gandolfo =

1975 story by Michael Shepherd

- The Road to Gandolfo first edition cover.
- Author: Michael Shepherd
- Language: English
- Genre: Crime
- Publisher: Dial Press
- Publication date: January 1975
- Publication place: United States
- Media type: Print (hardback & paperback)
- Pages: 258 pp (first edition)
- ISBN: 0-8037-5920-7
- OCLC: 1175301
- Dewey Decimal: 813/.5/4
- LC Class: PS3562.U26 R6 1975
- Followed by: The Road to Omaha

The Road to Gandolfo is a story by Michael Shepherd (a pen name used by Robert Ludlum) about General MacKenzie Hawkins ("The Hawk"), a military legend and Army veteran. He defaces an important Chinese memorial as a result of being drugged by a Chinese general and is later kicked out of the Army. Seeking revenge, he plots to kidnap Pope Francesco I and hold him for ransom of $400 million, one dollar for every Catholic in the world.

The only person who can stop him is Sam Devereaux, an army lawyer who rescues the Hawk from China but subsequently himself gets trapped in the Hawk's plan. The story revolves around how Hawkins executes the mission with amazing precision and discipline along with his band of seven provocateurs and the unexpected reaction by Pope Francesco.

== Additional information ==
Unlike the usual books by Ludlum, this one tends to be overwhelmingly humorous. There is a sequel to this story called The Road to Omaha. The character MacKenzie Hawkins is also mentioned fleetingly in Robert Ludlum's novel The Bourne Identity, where he is mentioned to have previously served in Burma.

== Publication history ==
- 1975, US, Dial Press ISBN 0-8037-5920-7, Pub date January 1975, Hardback
- 1982, US, Bantam Books ISBN 0-553-26081-2, Pub date July 1, 1982, Paperback
- 1976, UK, Grafton ISBN 0-246-10925-4 Pub date August 23, 1976, Hardback
- 1992, UK, HarperCollins ISBN 0-586-04375-6, Pub date March 26, 1992, Paperback
