= William Peskett =

Northern Irish poet (born 1952)

- Born: 1952 (age 73–74)
- Occupation: Poet

William Peskett (born 1952) is a poet from Northern Ireland.

Peskett was educated in Belfast and at Cambridge University, where he read natural sciences.

He has published two volumes of poems, The Nightowl’s Dissection (Secker & Warburg 1975) and Survivors (Secker & Warburg 1980), for the first of which he won an Eric Gregory Award for poetry. In the 1970s, Peskett edited the poetry magazine, Caret, with Trevor McMahon and Robert Johnstone. He wrote two novels, Pondlife and Losing Yourself. He has worked in teaching, journalism, marketing, design management and corporate relations and lives in Thailand.
