= Duncan Bush =

British poet (1946–2017)

- Born: 1946; Cardiff, Wales
- Died: 18 August 2017 (aged 70–71)
- Occupations: Poet, novelist, dramatist, translator, documentary writer
- Writing career
- Language: English
- Period: 1974–2017
- Notable works: The Genre of Silence (1987); Masks (1994)
- Notable awards: Wales Book of the Year, 1995

Duncan Bush (6 April 1946 – 18 August 2017) was a Welsh poet, novelist, dramatist (for film, TV, radio and stage), translator and documentary writer.

Bush was born in Cardiff. He was educated at Warwick University, Duke University and Wadham College, Oxford. His collections Aquarium and Salt were awarded the Welsh Arts Council Prize for Poetry in 1984 and 1986 respectively – both republished in a single volume The Hook (Seren Books). His 1995 collection, Masks, was a Poetry Society recommendation and won the Wales Book of the Year award for an English-language work.

His poetry and short fiction have appeared in numerous magazines and major anthologies, including The Penguin Book of Welsh Short Stories, Granta, The London Magazine, The New Poetry, Twentieth Century Anglo-Welsh Poetry, The Firebox.

He published three novels: The Genre of Silence (Seren, 1987) is set in the USSR during the Civil War; a psychological thriller, Glass Shot (Secker & Warburg hardback 1991; Mandarin paperback, 1993), takes place during the 1985-6 Miners’ Strike; and Now All The Rage (Colophon, 2007) unfolds in an obsessive imaginative borderland between fame and obscurity. His collection of poetry The Flying Trapeze (Seren) appeared in 2012.

He also adapted his work for TV and radio and did commissioned work for film. Keenly interested in film, he wrote and presented the BBC Wales TV documentary Voices In The Dark: A Hundred Years of Cinema in Wales.

He published essays on a variety of literary topics, and regularly reviewed on contemporary poetry and fiction for a number of periodicals, including The London Magazine, Poetry Wales and the Luxemburger Wort. In addition he published numerous translations from French and Italian poetry. During his last years he was working on a new collection of poetry, and preparing his translations of the complete poems of Cesare Pavese.

He was founding co-editor of The Amsterdam Review, a bi-annual magazine featuring European literature in English or English translation.

Duncan Bush taught at various schools, colleges and universities in Great Britain, continental Europe and the USA.

== Works ==
Poetry

- Three Young Anglo-Welsh Poets (1974)
- Aquarium (1984)
- Salt (1986)
- Masks (1995)
- The Hook (1997)
- Midway (1997)
- The Flying Trapeze (2012)

Novels

- The Genre of Silence (1987)
- Glass Shot (1991)
- Now All the Rage (2007)
