= 1974 in literature =

This article contains information about the literary events and publications of 1974.

== Events ==
- February – Novelist Juan Carlos Onetti is one of a group arrested by the Uruguayan dictatorship for selecting as a competition prizewinner and publishing in the newspaper Marcha a short story implicitly critical of the military regime. He subsequently goes into exile in Spain.
- February 12 – After publication at the end of 1973 of Aleksandr Solzhenitsyn's The Gulag Archipelago (Russian: Архипелаг ГУЛАГ), the author is arrested for treason; the following day he is deported from the Soviet Union. In spring and summer, the first translations into French and English begin to appear.
- August 8 – The first of Armistead Maupin's Tales of the City is published as a serial in The Pacific Sun (Marin County, California).
- October 21 – New Guildhall Library opens in the City of London.
- unknown dates
  - The Jack Kerouac School of Disembodied Poetics is founded by Allen Ginsberg and Anne Waldman.
  - German writer Uwe Johnson moves to Sheerness on the English Isle of Sheppey.

== New books ==
=== Fiction ===
- Eric Ambler – Doctor Frigo
- Kingsley Amis – Ending Up
- René Barjavel – Les Dames à la licorne
- Augusto Roa Bastos – I, the Supreme (Yo el supremo)
- Peter Benchley – Jaws
- Hal Bennett – Wait Until the Evening
- Heinrich Böll – The Lost Honour of Katharina Blum (Die verlorene Ehre der Katharina Blum oder: Wie Gewalt entstehen und wohin sie führen kann)
- Anthony Burgess – The Clockwork Testament, or Enderby's End
- Andrés Caicedo – "Maternidad"
- Agatha Christie – Poirot's Early Cases
- Roald Dahl – Switch Bitch
- Philip K. Dick – Flow My Tears, The Policeman Said
- Annie Dillard – Pilgrim at Tinker Creek
- Lawrence Durrell – Monsieur
- Frederick Forsyth – The Dogs of War
- John Fowles – The Ebony Tower
- Donald Goines – Crime Partners
- Imil Habibi – The Secret Life of Saeed: The Pessoptimist (الوقائع الغريبة في اختفاء سعيد أبي النحس المتشائل, Al-Waqāʾiʿ al-gharībah fī 'khtifāʾ Saʿīd Abī 'l-Naḥsh al-Mutashāʾil)
- John Hawkes – Death Sleep
- Joseph Heller – Something Happened
- James Herbert – The Rats
- Hammond Innes – North Star
- Anna Kavan – Let Me Alone
- Stephen King – Carrie
- Manuel Mujica Láinez
  - El laberinto
  - El viaje de los siete demonios
- Derek Lambert
  - Blackstone and the Scourge of Europe
  - The Yermakov Transfer
- Margaret Laurence – The Diviners
- John le Carré – Tinker, Tailor, Soldier, Spy
- Ursula K. Le Guin – The Dispossessed
- Madeleine L'Engle – A Wind in the Door
- H. P. Lovecraft and August Derleth – The Watchers Out of Time and Others
- Robert Ludlum – The Cry of the Halidon
- Brian Lumley – Beneath the Moors
- Ngaio Marsh – Black as He's Painted
- Colleen McCullough – Tim
- Nicholas Meyer – The Seven-Per-Cent Solution
- James A. Michener – Centennial
- Elsa Morante – La Storia (History. A Novel, 1978)
- Gerald Murnane – Tamarisk Row
- Meja Mwangi – Carcase for Hounds
- Vladimir Nabokov – Look at the Harlequins!
- Edith Pargeter – Sunrise in the West (first in the Brothers of Gwynedd quartet)
- Robert B. Parker – God Save the Child
- Ellen Raskin – Figgs & Phantoms
- Ishmael Reed – The Last Days of Louisiana Red
- Brigitte Reimann (died 1973) – Franziska Linkerhand
- Harold Robbins – The Pirate
- Fran Ross – Oreo
- Nawal El Saadawi – God Dies by the Nile
- Leonardo Sciascia – Todo modo
- Tom Sharpe – Porterhouse Blue
- Sidney Sheldon – The Other Side of Midnight
- C. P. Snow – In Their Wisdom

=== Children and young people ===
- Richard Adams – Shardik
- Stan and Jan Berenstain – The Berenstain Bears' New Baby
- Robert Cormier – The Chocolate War
- Paula Danziger – The Cat Ate My Gymsuit
- Fynn (Sydney Hopkins) – Mister God, This Is Anna
- Virginia Hamilton – M. C. Higgins, the Great
- Diana Wynne Jones – The Ogre Downstairs
- Ruth Manning-Sanders – A Book of Sorcerers and Spells
- Jill Murphy – The Worst Witch
- Bill Peet – Merle the High Flying Squirrel
- Miriam Roth – A Tale of Five Balloons (מעשה בחמישה בלונים)
- Richard Scarry – The Best Rainy Day Book Ever
- Jill Paton Walsh – The Emperor's Winding Sheet
- Mary E. Wilkins-Freeman – Collected Ghost Stories

=== Drama ===
- Nezihe Araz – Bozkır Güzellemesi (An Ode to the Steppe)
- Michael Cook – Jacob's Wake
- Dario Fo – Can't Pay? Won't Pay! (Non Si Paga! Non Si Paga!)
- Paavo Haavikko
  - Ratsumies (The Horseman)
  - Kuningas lähtee Ranskaan (The King Goes Forth to France)
  - Harald Pitkäikäinen
- Ira Levin – Veronica's Room
- Mustapha Matura – Play Mas
- Harold Pinter – No Man's Land
- David Rudkin – Penda's Fen (television play)
- Tom Stoppard – Travesties

=== Poetry ===
- Duncan Bush, Tony Curtis, Nigel Jenkins – Three Young Anglo-Welsh Poets

=== Non-fiction ===
- Maya Angelou – Gather Together in My Name
- Carl Bernstein and Bob Woodward – All the President's Men
- Augusto Boal – Teatro del oprimido y otras poéticas políticas (translated as Theatre of the Oppressed 1979)
- Vincent Bugliosi with Curt Gentry – Helter Skelter
- Robert A. Caro – The Power Broker
- David Clark – Social Therapy in Psychiatry
- Shelby Foote – The Civil War: A Narrative – Vol 3: Red River to Appomattox
- The Freud/Jung Letters
- Dumas Malone – Jefferson the President: Second Term, 1805-1809
- Robert M. Pirsig – Zen and the Art of Motorcycle Maintenance
- Erin Pizzey – Scream Quietly or the Neighbours Will Hear
- Jonathan Raban – Soft City
- Piers Paul Read – Alive: The Story of the Andes Survivors
- Barbu Solacolu – Evocări. Confesiuni. Portrete (Memoirs. Confessions. Portraits)
- Soviet Armenian Encyclopedia (Հայկական Սովետական Հանրագիտարան, Haykakan sovetakan hanragitaran; begins publication)
- Lewis Thomas – The Lives of a Cell: Notes of a Biology Watcher
- Studs Terkel – Working
- Joseph Wambaugh – The Onion Field

== Births ==
- January 6 – Romain Sardou, French novelist
- January 26 – Shannon Hale, American fantasy author
- February 15 – Miranda July (née Grossinger), American filmmaker, performance artist and fiction writer
- April 13 – K. Sello Duiker, South African novelist (died 2005)
- June 12 – Chika Unigwe, Nigerian novelist writing in English and Dutch
- August 7 – Faisal Tehrani, Malaysian novelist
- August 9 – Ryūsui Seiryōin (清涼院 流水), Japanese novelist
- August 18 – Nicole Krauss, American novelist
- August 23 – Serhiy Zhadan, Ukrainian poet, novelist and essayist
- September 20 – Owen Sheers, Fijian-born Welsh poet, playwright and novelist
- November 4 – Carlos Be, Spanish playwright
- December 26 – Joshua John Miller, American novelist and screenwriter
- unknown dates
  - Naomi Alderman, English novelist
  - Sarah Hall, English novelist
  - Joanna Kavenna, English novelist and travel writer
  - Joe Meno, American novelist and journalist
  - Roger Williams, Welsh dramatist and screenwriter

== Deaths ==
- January 20 – Edmund Blunden, English poet and critic (born 1896)
- January 25 – James Pope-Hennessy, English biographer (murdered, born 1916)
- January 29
  - H. E. Bates, English novelist (born 1905)
  - Sheila Stuart, Scottish author and children's writer (born 1892)
- February 2 – Marieluise Fleißer, German dramatist (born 1901)
- February 24 – Martin Armstrong, English poet and short story writer (born 1882)
- March 3 – Carl Jacob Burckhardt, Swiss historian (born 1891)
- March 8 – Buddhadeb Bosu, Bengali poet and writer (born 1908)
- March 19 – Austin Clarke, Irish poet, playwright and novelist (born 1896)
- March 24 – Olive Higgins Prouty, American novelist (born 1882)
- April 14 – Howard Pease, American novelist (born 1894)
- May 9 – L. T. C. Rolt, English biographer and writer of ghost stories (born 1910)
- May 13 – Arthur J. Burks, American writer (born 1898)
- June 2 – Tom Kristensen, Danish novelist and poet (born 1893)
- June 11 – Julius Evola, Italian esotericist, journalist and philosopher (born 1898)
- June 9 – Miguel Ángel Asturias, Guatemalan Nobel Prize-winning novelist (born 1899)
- July 3 – Samuel Roth, American publisher (born 1893)
- July 4 – Georgette Heyer, English novelist (born 1902)
- July 16 – Oduvaldo Vianna Filho, Brazilian playwright (born 1936)
- July 29 - Erich Kästner, German children's author (born 1899)
- August 7 – Rosario Castellanos, Mexican writer and diplomat (electric shock, born 1925)
- August 11 – Jan Tschichold, German-born typographer and writer (born 1902)
- August 17 – Emma L. Brock, American children's author and illustrator (born 1886)
- September 11 – Lois Lenski, American author and illustrator (born 1893)
- September 21 – Jacqueline Susann, American novelist (born 1918)
- October 4 – Anne Sexton, American poet (born 1928)
- October 28 – David Jones, Anglo-Welsh poet and artist (born 1895)
- October 29 – Victor E. van Vriesland, Dutch writer (born 1892)
- November 5 – William Gardner Smith, expatriate American novelist and journalist (born 1927)
- November 7 – Eric Linklater, Welsh-born Scottish novelist and travel writer (born 1899)
- November 26 – Cyril Connolly, English critic and writer (born 1903)
- December 14 – Walter Lippmann, American writer (born 1889)

== Awards ==
- Nobel Prize for Literature: Eyvind Johnson and Harry Martinson

=== Canada ===
- See 1974 Governor General's Awards for a complete list of winners and finalists for those awards.

=== France ===
- Prix Goncourt: Pascal Lainé, La Dentellière
- Prix Médicis:
  - French: Porporino ou les Mystèrs de Naples
  - International: Julio Cortázar, Libro de Manuel

=== United Kingdom ===
- Booker Prize: Nadine Gordimer, The Conservationist and Stanley Middleton, Holiday.
- Carnegie Medal for children's literature: Mollie Hunter, The Stronghold
- Cholmondeley Award: D.J. Enright, Vernon Scannell, Alasdair Maclean
- Eric Gregory Award: Duncan Forbes, Roger Garfitt, Robin Hamilton, Frank Ormsby, Penelope Shuttle
- Newdigate prize: Alan Hollinghurst
- James Tait Black Memorial Prize:
  - Fiction: Lawrence Durrell, Monsieur, or the Prince of Darkness
  - Biography: John Wain, Samuel Johnson
- Queen's Gold Medal for Poetry: Ted Hughes

=== United States ===
- Frost Medal: John Hall Wheelock
- Hugo Award:
  - Best Novella: James Tiptree Jr., The Girl Who Was Plugged In
  - Best Novel: Arthur C. Clarke, Rendezvous with Rama
- Nebula Award: Ursula K. Le Guin, The Dispossessed
- Newbery Medal for children's literature: Paula Fox, The Slave Dancer
- Pulitzer Prize:
  - Drama: no award given
  - Fiction: no award given
  - Poetry: Robert Lowell, The Dolphin

=== Elsewhere ===
- Friedenspreis des Deutschen Buchhandels: Frère Roger
- Miles Franklin Award: Ronald McKie, The Mango Tree
- Premio Nadal: Luis Gasulla, Culminación de Montoya
- Viareggio Prize: Clotilde Marghieri, Amati enigmi
