= Sebastian (Durrell novel) =

1983 novel by Lawrence Durrell

- First edition
- Author: Lawrence Durrell
- Language: English
- Series: The Avignon Quintet
- Publisher: Faber & Faber
- Publication date: 1983
- Publication place: United Kingdom
- Media type: Print (Paperback and Hardback)
- Pages: 202 pp
- ISBN: 0-14-007705-7
- OCLC: 11649588
- Dewey Decimal: 823/.912 19
- LC Class: PR6007.U76 S4 1985
- Preceded by: Constance
- Followed by: Quinx

Sebastian, or Ruling Passions (1983), is the fourth volume in The Avignon Quintet series by British author Lawrence Durrell, which was published from 1974 to 1985. This novel is set mainly in Switzerland immediately after World War II. It continues the story of Constance and a Gnostic cult, which was introduced in the first novel of the quintet, Monsieur (1974).

== Plot summary ==
A letter informs the Egyptian Sebastian Affad that he will die; a mix up has caused major ructions within the Gnostic sect in Egypt. Affad is called back to Egypt for admonishment. Before leaving Switzerland, however, he has asked Constance to use her psychiatric skills to treat his son, who has become autistic. She is gradually successful in working with the boy. After Affad returns to Switzerland from Egypt, the couple renew their relationship.

The psychopath Mnemidis intervenes. After escaping from the institution where Constance works, he goes to her flat, intending to kill her, but murders Affad instead. The book finishes in a surreal manner. Affad seems virtually to disappear from Constance's memory; and two chapters give conflicting accounts of Constance's action upon the death of her boss Schwartz. Unexpectedly Sylvie reappears, for the first time since Monsieur. (She is said to be a fictional creation of author Aubrey Blanford, also introduced in the first novel as a character.) She begins an affair with Constance.

== Reception ==
Critic Graham Hough of the London Review of Books wrote about the need to read all the novels in this series. But he also wrote, "As it happened, I read them in the wrong order, but such is the vitality and attack of Durrell’s writing that it hardly mattered. Enter them anywhere and one is sucked into the stream."
