= Ora Ayal =

Israeli writer and illustrator

- אורה איל
- Born: May 16, 1946; Jerusalem, Mandatory Palestine
- Died: February 26, 2011; Jerusalem, Israel
- Education: Hebrew Gymnasium Rehavia, Bezalel Academy of Arts and Design Jerusalem
- Occupations: Writer, Illustrator, Editor, Translator
- Known for: Illustrating children's books
- Notable work: A Tale of Five Balloons, Uri's Special Language
- Children: 1
- Awards: Hans Christian Andersen Award for Children's and Youth Literature, Ben-Yitzhak Award

Ora Ayal (Hebrew: אורה איל; March 16, 1946 – February 26, 2011) was an Israeli writer and illustrator, mainly known for her illustrations of well-known children's books.

== Biography ==
Ora Ayal (1946–2011) was born in Jerusalem to descendants of Yitzhak Lifkin, builders of Jerusalem neighborhoods. She studied at the "Bezalel" art school, and received a degree in mathematics from the Hebrew University of Jerusalem. Ayal created games, stories, and activities for teaching elementary-level math. She also translated adult and children's books from Italian into Hebrew.

The first book she illustrated was "A Tale of Five Balloons" by Miriam Roth, published in 1974. She subsequently illustrated over 100 children's books, including "Yael's House" and "Hot Terrace" by Miriam Ruth, "Mr. Zuta and the Apple Tree" by Orit Raz, and the "Itamar Stories" series by David Grossman. Her illustrations for Grossman's book "Uri's Special Language" earned her the Hans Christian Andersen Award for Children's and Youth Literature in 1990 (Note: IBBY, Honour List (1990), 1990, pp.39–40.).

Ayal wrote and illustrated eight books for children, including "One Dark Night," "One Bright Morning," and "Ogabu." She described her creative process (Note: Nurit Shilo-Cohen (editor), The Great Illustrators Book, Israel Museum, Ruth Youth Wing, 2005): "Usually the story is in my head. I prepare the drawings and then write the entire text in its final form."

In her later years, she worked as an editor and translator of books, including "The Cheese and the Worms" and "Dad Doesn't Want to Sleep," and a selection of children's books by Italian author Gianni Rodari such as "The Rain Man," "Lisa in the Land of Legends," and "Telephone Stories" (Note: Haaretz, Bar Hayon, Sock Salad - "Telephone Stories", July 1, 2009).

In 1994, she won the Ben-Yitzhak Award for her illustrations of the book "Five Witches Went on a Trip" by Ronit Chacham.

Ora Ayal died in 2011 at the age of 64 from Parkinson's, which she had been diagnosed with about ten years earlier.

== Books she wrote and illustrated ==
- One Bright Morning, Keren Or Publishing, 1975
- Ogabu, Poalim Library, 1977. Agam Publishing, 2021
- Oren's Turtle (written by Mira Meir), 1977
- One Bright Morning, Poalim Library, 1985
- The Great War Poalim Library, 1986
- A Girl Alone, Keter Publishing, 1992
- One Dark Night, Poalim Library, 1988
- Hannah Banana's Granny Cooked Porridge, Ayalot Publishing, 1996
