= Henry David Thoreau: A Life of the Mind =

1986 book by Robert D. Richardson, Jr.

- Title page for Henry David Thoreau: A Life of the Mind (1986)
- Author: Robert D. Richardson, Jr.
- Subject: Biography
- Publisher: University of California Press
- Publication date: 1986
- Pages: 455

Henry David Thoreau: A Life of the Mind is a 1986 biography of Henry David Thoreau by Robert D. Richardson, Jr.

== Bibliography ==
- Buell, Lawrence (1987). "Review of Henry David Thoreau: A Life of the Mind., Robert D. Richardson, Jr". American Literature. 59 (1): 119–121. doi:10.2307/2926490. ISSN 0002-9831. JSTOR 2926490.
- Caruthers, J. Wade (1987). "Review of Henry David Thoreau: A Life of the Mind, Robert D. Richardson, Jr". The American Historical Review. 92 (5): 1276–1277. doi:10.2307/1868632. ISSN 0002-8762. JSTOR 1868632.
- Fleck, Richard F. (1988). "Review of Henry David Thoreau: A Life of the Mind, Robert D. Richardson, Jr". Journal of Forest History. 32 (2): 92–93. doi:10.2307/4005073. ISSN 0094-5080. JSTOR 4005073.
- Hughes, J. Donald (1987). "Review of Henry David Thoreau: A Life of the Mind, Robert D. Richardson, Jr". Environmental Review. 11 (2): 149–151. doi:10.2307/3984026. ISSN 0147-2496. JSTOR 3984026.
- Robinson, David (1987). "'A Life of the Mind'". The Virginia Quarterly Review. 63 (4): 719–724. ISSN 0042-675X. JSTOR 26437909.
