= Touch the Lion's Paw =

1975 novel

- Author: Derek Lambert
- Language: English
- Genre: Thriller
- Publisher: E. P. Dutton & Co.
- Publication date: 1975
- Publication place: United Kingdom
- Media type: Print

Touch the Lion's Paw is a 1975 thriller novel by the British writer Derek Lambert. The plot revolves around a major diamond heist carried out in Amsterdam.

== Adaptation ==
In 1980 it was adapted into the film Rough Cut directed by Don Siegel and starring Burt Reynolds, Lesley-Anne Down and David Niven.

== Bibliography ==
- Burton, Alan. Historical Dictionary of British Spy Fiction. Rowman & Littlefield, 2016.
- Goble, Alan. The Complete Index to Literary Sources in Film. Walter de Gruyter, 1999.
