= An American Childhood =

1987 memoir by Annie Dillard

- Author: Annie Dillard
- Publisher: Harper & Row
- Publication date: 1987

An American Childhood is a 1987 memoir by Annie Dillard, published by Harper & Row.

It describes her childhood during the 1950s and 1960s in the Pittsburgh, Pennsylvania area. Kirkus Reviews noted that the book is more accessible to a general audience compared to Teaching the Stone to Talk.

== Reception ==
Noel Perrin in The New York Times stated that the book is "remarkable," while also noting "overwriting" and expressing a desire for a more structured "plot" rather than a sole focus on Dillard's internal thoughts.

Publishers Weekly described Dillard's writing style as "luminous," adding that her presentation of memories with "original immediacy and force" enhances the writing.

Evelyn Small, in Washington Post, stated that the author "helped usher in the age of memoirs" with the book.
