= Beau Blackstone =

1973 novel

- First edition
- Author: Derek Lambert
- Language: English
- Series: Edmund Blackstone
- Genre: Historical thriller
- Publisher: Stein and Day
- Publication date: 1973
- Publication place: United Kingdom
- Media type: Print
- Preceded by: Blackstone's Fancy
- Followed by: Blackstone and the Scourge of Europe

Beau Blackstone is a 1973 historical thriller novel by the British writer Derek Lambert, published under the pen name Richard Falkirk. It is the third in a series of six novels featuring Edmund Blackstone, a member of the Bow Street Runners in the pre-Victorian era. Blackstone goes undercover amongst a gang of navvies working on a new railway, and is called on for plans to thwart the first Great Train Robbery.

== Bibliography ==
- David Nash & Anne-Marie Kilday. Law, Crime and Deviance Since 1700: Micro-Studies in the History of Crime. Bloomsbury Publishing, 2016.
