= Blackstone's Fancy =

1973 novel

- First edition
- Author: Derek Lambert
- Language: English
- Series: Edmund Blackstone
- Genre: Historical thriller
- Publisher: Methuen Publishing
- Publication date: 1973
- Publication place: United Kingdom
- Media type: Print
- Preceded by: Blackstone
- Followed by: Beau Blackstone

Blackstone's Fancy is a 1973 historical thriller novel by the British writer Derek Lambert, published under the pen name Richard Falkirk. It is the second in a series of novels featuring Edmund Blackstone, a member of the Bow Street Runners in the pre-Victorian era. Blackstone gets mixed up in the world of prizefighting.

== Bibliography ==
- Frankie Y. Bailey. Out of the Woodpile: Black Characters in Crime and Detective Fiction. ABC-CLIO, 1991.
