= Pilgrim at Tinker Creek =

1974 nonfiction book by Annie Dillard

First edition cover (1974)

Pilgrim at Tinker Creek is a 1974 nonfiction narrative book by American author Annie Dillard. Told from a first-person point of view, the book details Dillard's explorations near her home, and various contemplations on nature and life. The title refers to Tinker Creek, which is outside Roanoke in Virginia's Blue Ridge Mountains. Dillard began Pilgrim in the spring of 1973, using her personal journals as inspiration. Separated into four sections that signify each of the seasons, the narrative takes place over the period of one year.

The book records the narrator's thoughts on solitude, writing, and religion, as well as scientific observations on the flora and fauna she encounters. It touches on themes of faith, nature, and awareness, and is also noted for its study of theodicy and the cruelty of the natural world. The author has described it as a "book of theology", and she rejects the label of nature writer. Dillard considers the story a "single sustained nonfiction narrative", although several chapters have been anthologized separately in magazines and other publications. The book is analogous in design and genre to Henry David Thoreau's Walden (1854), the subject of Dillard's master's thesis at Hollins College. Critics often compare Dillard to authors from the Transcendentalist movement.

Pilgrim at Tinker Creek was published by Harper's Magazine Press shortly after Dillard's first book, a volume of poetry titled Tickets for a Prayer Wheel. Since its initial publication, Pilgrim has been lauded by critics. It won the 1975 Pulitzer Prize for General Nonfiction, and in 1998 it was included in Modern Library's list of 100 Best Nonfiction Books.

== Background and publication ==
Dillard was the daughter of an oil company executive and grew up in an upper-middle-class home in Pittsburgh. She read voraciously; one of her favorite books was Ann Haven Morgan's The Field Book of Ponds and Streams, which she compared to the Book of Common Prayer; in painstaking detail, it instructed on the study and collection of plants and insects. She attended Hollins College in Roanoke County, Virginia, receiving both a bachelor's (1967) and a master's degree (1968). At Hollins she came under the tutelage of poet and creative writing professor Richard Henry Wilde Dillard, whom she married in 1965; she would later state that he taught her everything she knew about writing. Her master's thesis, entitled Walden Pond and Thoreau, studied the eponymous pond as a structuring device for Henry David Thoreau's Walden. Dillard's knowledge of Thoreau's works was an obvious inspiration, although critics have pointed to many differences between their two works. However, in a nod to his influence, Dillard mentions within the text that she named her goldfish Ellery Channing, after one of Thoreau's closest friends.

After graduating in 1968, she continued to live in Virginia, near the Blue Ridge Mountains, where she wrote full-time. At first she concentrated solely on poetry, which she had written and published when she was an undergraduate. She began keeping a journal in 1970, in which she recorded her daily walks around Tinker Creek. Her journals would eventually consist of 20 volumes. In 1971, after suffering from a serious bout of pneumonia, she decided to write a full-length book dedicated to her nature writings. Dillard wrote the first half of Pilgrim at her home in spring 1973, and the remaining half the following summer in a study carrel "that overlooked a tar-and-gravel roof" at the Hollins College library. She would later explain her choice of writing location as stemming from her wanting to avoid "appealing workplaces . ... One wants a room with no view, so imagination can meet memory in the dark." When she first began writing the book, Dillard would only dedicate one or two hours a day to the task; by the last two months, however, she was writing nearly 15–16 hours a day.

Dillard's primary reader for Pilgrim was the Hollins professor John Rees Moore. After finishing a chapter, she would bring it to him to critique. Moore specifically recommended that she expand the book's first chapter "to make clear, and to state boldly, what it was [she] was up to," a suggestion that Dillard at first dismissed, but would later admit was good advice. Before its publication, chapters of the book appeared in publications such as Harper's Magazine, The Atlantic and The Living Wilderness. Pilgrim at Tinker Creek was published by Harper's Magazine Press in 1974, and was dedicated to Dillard's husband. Editor in chief Larry Freundlich remarked upon first reading the book: "I never expected to see a manuscript this good in my life . ... The chance to publish a book like this is what publishers are here for."

== Summary ==
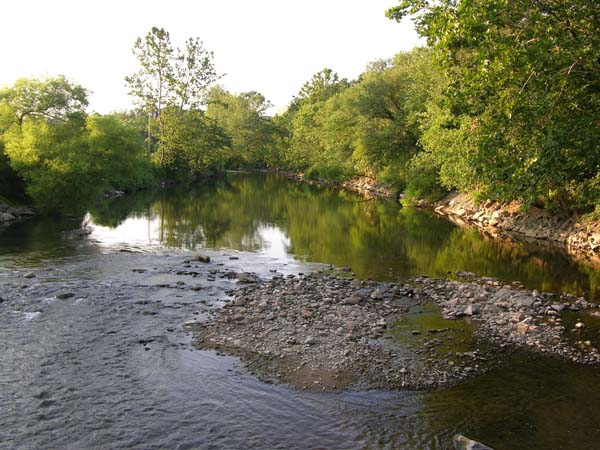
Tinker Creek is part of the upper Roanoke River watershed, like this body of water running through Wasena, Roanoke, Virginia.

The book is set in the Blue Ridge Mountains near Roanoke, Virginia, and consists of a series of internal monologues and reflections. Over the course of a year, she observes and reflects upon the changing of the seasons as well as the flora and fauna near her home. Pilgrim is thematically divided into four sections, one for each season, consisting of separate, named chapters: "Heaven and Earth in Jest", "Seeing", "Winter", "The Fixed", "The Knot", "The Present", "Spring", "Intricacy", "Flood", "Fecundity", "Stalking", "Nightwatch", "The Horns of the Altar", "Northing", and "The Waters of Separation".

In the opening chapter, "Heaven and Earth in Jest", the narrator describes her connection to the location:

I live by a creek, Tinker Creek, in a valley in Virginia's Blue Ridge. An anchorite's hermitage is called an anchor-hold; some anchor-holds were simple sheds clamped to the side of a church like a barnacle on a rock. I think of this house clamped to the side of Tinker Creek as an anchor-hold. It holds me at anchor to the rock bottom of the creek itself and keeps me steadied in the current, as a sea anchor does, facing the stream of light pouring down. It's a good place to live; there's a lot to think about.

In the afterword of the 1999 Harper Perennial Modern Classics edition, Dillard states that the book's other, two-part structure mirrors the two routes to God according to neoplatonic christianity: the via positiva and the via negativa. The first half, the via positiva, beginning with the second chapter, "accumulates the world's goodness and God's." The second half, the via negativa, ends with the chapter "Northing", which Dillard notes is the counterpart of the second chapter, "Seeing". The first and last chapters of the book serve as the introduction and conclusion, respectively. The narrative is composed of vignettes detailing the narrator's wanderings around the creek. In "The Present", the narrator encounters a puppy at a gas station off the highway, and pats its belly while contemplating the view of the nearby mountain range; the reflective act of "petting the puppy" is referred to in several other chapters. In "Stalking", the narrator pursues a group of muskrats in the creek during summer. One of the most famous passages comes from the beginning of the book, when the narrator witnesses a frog being drained and devoured by a giant water bug.

== Style and genre ==
Pilgrim at Tinker Creek is a work of creative nonfiction that uses poetic devices such as metaphor, repetition, and inversion to convey the importance of recurrent themes. Although it is often described as a series of essays, Dillard has insisted it is a continuous work, as evidenced by references to events from previous chapters. Although the chapters are separately named—several have also been published separately in magazines and anthologies—she referred to the book in a 1989 interview as a "single sustained nonfiction narrative". Dillard has also resisted the label of "nature writer", especially in regard to Pilgrim. She stated, "There's usually a bit of nature in what I write, but I don't consider myself a nature writer."

The book often quotes and alludes to Walden, although Dillard does not explicitly state her interest in Thoreau's work. Critic Donna Mendelson notes that Thoreau's "presence is so potent in her book that Dillard can borrow from [him] both straightforwardly and also humorously." Although the two works are often compared, Pilgrim does not comment upon the social world as Walden does; rather, it is completely rooted in observations of the natural world. Unlike Thoreau, Dillard does not make connections between the history of social and natural aspects, nor does she believe in an ordered universe. Whereas Thoreau refers to the machine-like universe, in which the creator is akin to a master watchmaker, Dillard recognizes the imperfection of creation, in which "something is everywhere and always amiss".

In her review for The New York Times, Eudora Welty noted Pilgrim's narrator being "the only person in [Dillard's] book, substantially the only one in her world . ... Speaking of the universe very often, she is yet self-surrounded". Dillard seemingly refers to the idea of an "invisible narrator" in the sixth chapter of Pilgrim at Tinker Creek; while referring to the "infinite power" of God, the narrator notes that "invisibility is the all-time great 'cover'". Nancy C. Parrish, author of the 1998 book Lee Smith, Annie Dillard, and the Hollins Group: A Genesis of Writers, notes that despite its having been written in the first person, Pilgrim is not necessarily autobiographical. The narrator, "Annie Dillard", therefore becomes a persona through which the author can experience and describe "thoughts and events that the real Annie Dillard had only heard about or studied or imagined." Critic Suzanne Clark also points to the "peculiar evasiveness" of Dillard-the-author, noting that "when we read Annie Dillard, we don't know who is writing. There is a silence in the place where there might be an image of the social self—of personality, character, or ego". While most critics assume that the narrator is female, mostly due to the autobiographical elements of the book and the assumption that the narrator is Dillard herself, Clark questions whether the narrator is male. Stating that Dillard uses "a variety of male voices, male styles" throughout the book, Clark asks, "When Dillard quit writing Pilgrim at Tinker Creek in the persona of a fifty year old man, did she then begin to write as a woman?"

== Themes ==
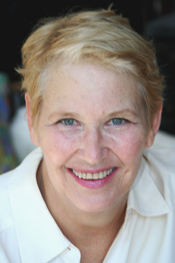
Annie Dillard in 2011, portrait by Phyllis Rose

=== Religion and nature ===
The book contains a defense of theodicy; that is of God's goodness in the face of evil. The narrator attempts to reconcile the harsh natural world, with its "seemingly horrid mortality," with the belief in a benevolent God. Death is repeatedly mentioned as a natural, although cruel progression: "Evolution", the narrator states, "loves death more than it loves you or me." A passage in the second chapter of the book describes a frog being "sucked dry" by a "giant water bug" as the narrator watches; this necessary cruelty shows order in life and death, no matter how difficult it may be to watch. The narrator especially sees inherent cruelty in the insect world: "Fish gotta swim and birds gotta fly ... insects, it seems, gotta do one horrible thing after another. I never ask why of a vulture or a shark, but I ask why of almost every insect I see. More than one insect ... is an assault on all human virtue, all hope of a reasonable god." While she remains drawn to the ultimately repugnant and amoral natural world, she also questions her place in it. The narrator states, "I had thought to live by the side of the creek in order to shape my life to its free flow. But I seem to have reached a point where I must draw the line. It looks as though the creek is not buoying me up but dragging me down."

Although the book's title mentions pilgrimage, the narrator does not stray far from her home near the creek: the journey is metaphysical. Margaret Loewen Reimer, in one of the first critical studies based on the book, noted that Dillard's treatment of the metaphysical is similar to that of Herman Melville. While "Melville's eyes saw mainly the darkness and the horror" of the natural world, possibly stemming from his New England Puritan roots, Dillard's "sinister" vision of the world comes "more from a horror at the seeming mindlessness of nature's design than from a deeply pervasive sense of evil." Unlike Melville, however, Dillard does not moralize the natural world or seek to find parallels in human cultural acts; focusing largely on observation as well as scientific analysis, Dillard follows the example of Charles Darwin and other naturalists.

The "pilgrim" narrator seeks to behold the sacred, which she dedicates herself to finding either by "stalking" or "seeing". At one point, she sees a cedar tree near her house "charged and transfigured, each cell buzzing with flame" as the light hits it; this burning vision, reminiscent of creation's holy "fire", "comes and goes, mostly goes, but I live for it." Critic Jenny Emery Davidson believes that Dillard's act of "stalking" allows her to rewrite the hunting myth, a popular theme in nature writing which mediates the space between nature and humans. Although a long tradition of male nature writers—including James Fenimore Cooper, Jack London and Richard Nelson—have used this theme as "a symbolic ritual of violence", Dillard "ventures into the terrain of the hunt, employing its rhetoric while also challenging its conventions."

=== Seeing and awareness ===
While some critics describe the book as being more devoted to speculation of the divine and natural world than to self-exploration, others approach it in terms of Dillard's attention to self-awareness. For example, the critic Mary Davidson McConahay points to Dillard's Thoreauvian "commitment to awareness".

The narrator is self-aware and alert to every detail around her. Pilgrim's second chapter defines two types of seeing: as "verbalization" (active) and as "a letting go" (passive). The narrator refers to the difference between the two methods as "the difference between walking with and without a camera." Whereas the former requires the need to "analyze and pry", the latter only requires rapt attention. The act of seeing is exhaustive and exhausting, as one of the chapters relates: "I look at the water: minnows and shiners. If I am thinking minnows, a carp will fill my brain till I scream. I look at the water's surface: skaters, bubbles, and leaves sliding down. Suddenly my own face, reflected, startles me witless. Those snails have been tracking my face! Finally, with a shuddering wrench of the will, I see clouds, cirrus clouds. I'm dizzy. I fall in. This looking business is risky." Sandra Johnson refers to the structure of the book itself leading to an epiphany of self-awareness, or a "mystical experience"; as the narrator watches a falling maple key, she feels "lost, sunk ... gazing toward Tinker Mountain and feeling the earth reel down".

== Reception and awards ==
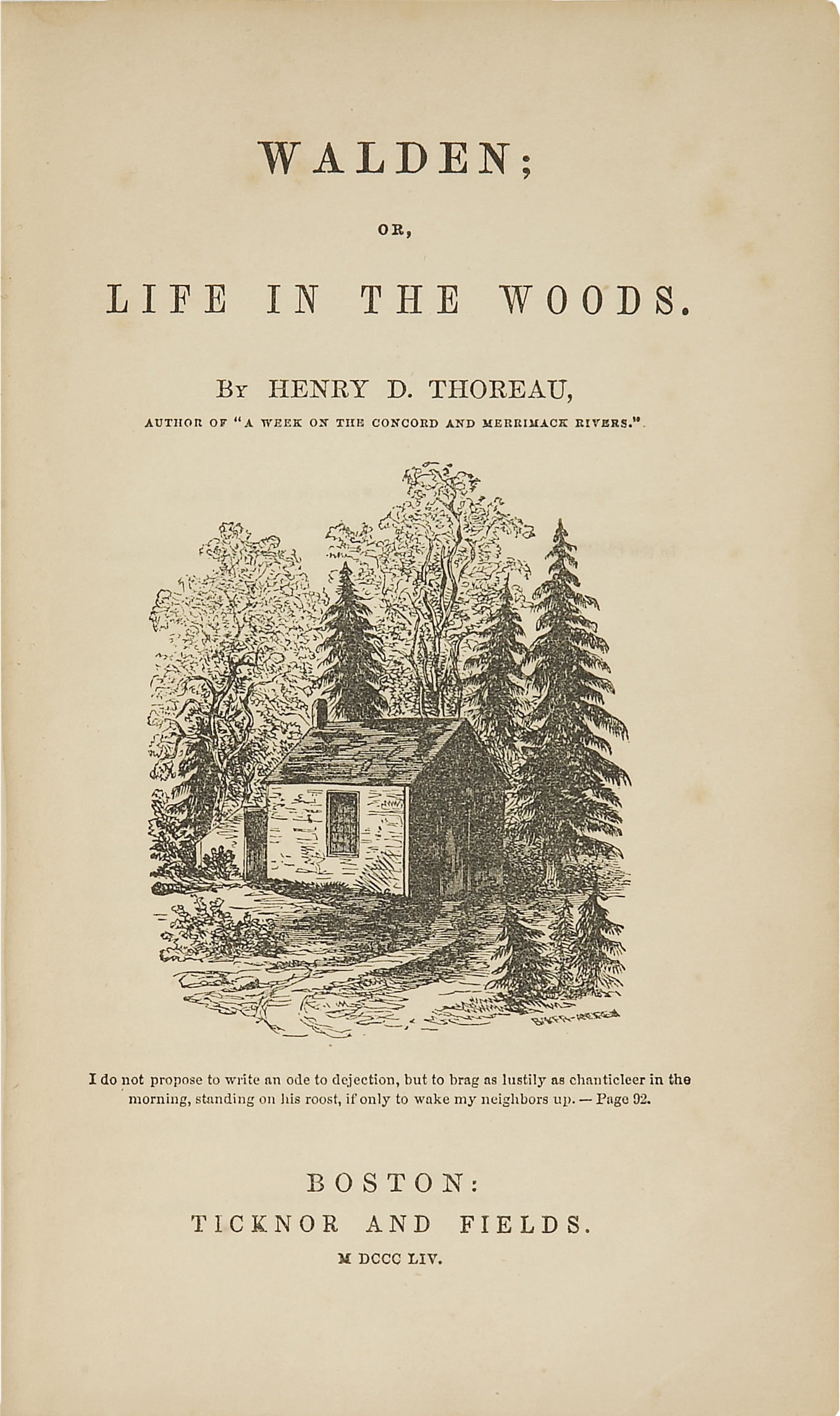
Dillard is often compared to Henry David Thoreau, whose book Walden (1854) shares similarities with Pilgrim at Tinker Creek.

The book was a critical and financial success, selling more than 37,000 copies within two months of publication. It went through eight separate printings in the first two years, and the paperback rights were quickly purchased. Dillard was unnerved by the crush of attention; shortly after the book was published, she wrote, "I'm starting to have dreams about Tinker Creek. Lying face down in it, all muddy and dried up and I'm drowning in it." She feared she had "shot my lifetime wad. Pilgrim is not only the wisdom of my 28 years but I think it's the wisdom of my whole life."

The initial consensus among reviewers was that it was "an unusual treatise on nature". The book was published soon after her poetry collection Tickets for a Prayer Wheel (1974, University of Missouri Press). Reviewing both volumes for America, John Breslin noted the similarities between the two: "Even if her first book of poems had not been published simultaneously, the language she uses in Pilgrim would have given her away." The Saturday Evening Post also praised Dillard's poetic ability in Pilgrim at Tinker Creek, noting that "the poet in her is everywhere evident in this prose-poem of hers: the reader's attention is caught not only by the freshness of her insights, but by the beauty of her descriptions as well." Melvin Maddocks, a reviewer for Time, noted Dillard's intention of subtle influence: "Reader, beware of this deceptive girl, mouthing her piety about 'the secret of seeing' being 'the pearl of great price,' modestly insisting, 'I am no scientist. I explore the neighborhood.' Here is no gentle romantic twirling a buttercup, no graceful inscriber of 365 inspirational prose poems. As she guides the attention to a muskrat, to a monarch butterfly, a heron or a coot, Miss Dillard is stalking the reader as surely as any predator stalks its game."

Despite being a bestseller, Pilgrim received little academic attention until more than five years after its publication. Early reviewers Charles Nicol and J. C. Peirce linked Dillard with the transcendentalist movement, comparing her to Thoreau and Ralph Waldo Emerson. Author and environmentalist Edward Abbey, known as the "Thoreau of the American West", stated that Dillard was the "true heir of the Master". He wrote, "she alone has been able to compose, successfully, in Thoreau's extravagant and transcendental manner." In his 1992 book critic Scott Slovic wrote that Pilgrim at Tinker Creek eventually "catapulted [Dillard] to prominence among contemporary American nonfiction writers—particularly among nature writers—and stimulated a wealth of reviews and a steadily accumulating body of criticism." Gary McIlroy believed that Dillard's work is distinctive for its "vibrant rediscovery of the woods. [She] studies the wildest remnants of the Virginia woodlands, stirring all the dark and promising mysteries of the American frontier." In a 2021 interview with Ezra Klein, author Ted Chiang was asked for his favourite religious text and said that he "can’t really point to a conventional religious text as an atheist" but that reading Pilgrim "gave me maybe the closest that I’m likely to get to understanding a kind of religious ecstasy".

Pilgrim at Tinker Creek won the Pulitzer Prize for General Nonfiction in 1975, when Dillard was 29 years old. The jury noted in its nomination that "Miss Dillard is an expert observer in whom science has not etiolated a sense of awe ... Her book is a blend of observation and introspection, mystery and knowledge. We unanimously recommend it for the prize." Since its initial publication, portions of the book have been anthologized in over thirty collections. Subsequent editions included those published by Bantam Books (1975) and Harper Colophon (1985; 1988). The Harper Perennial 25th-Anniversary edition, which included an afterword by the author, was released in 1999. The first UK edition was released in 1976. The book has been translated into many languages throughout the years, including Swedish, Japanese, French, and German. In 1998, it was listed in Modern Library 100 Best Nonfiction, both on the board's and the reader's lists.
