= The Red House (Lambert novel) =

1972 novel

- First edition
- Author: Derek Lambert
- Language: English
- Genre: Thriller
- Publisher: Michael Joseph
- Publication date: 1972
- Publication place: United Kingdom
- Media type: Print

The Red House is a 1972 thriller novel by the British writer Derek Lambert. A leading Soviet diplomat defects to the West.

== Bibliography ==
- Burton, Alan. Historical Dictionary of British Spy Fiction. Rowman & Littlefield, 2016.
