= A Wilderness of Vines =

1966 novel by Hal Bennett

- First edition
- Author: Hal Bennett
- Language: English
- Published: 1966
- Publisher: Doubleday
- Publication place: United States

A Wilderness of Vines is a 1966 novel by Hal Bennett about post-slavery life in the South.

== Synopsis ==
Opening in 1919, the novel traces intertwined families whose internalized caste systems mirror the surrounding Jim Crow order.

== Reception ==
Contemporary and later critics have noted the novel’s ambitious, uneven, but provocative satire. A 1971 teaching bibliography summarized its theme as a Black community imitating among themselves the white code of discrimination by color.
