= The Kites of War =

1969 novel

- First edition (UK)
- Author: Derek Lambert
- Language: English
- Genre: Thriller
- Publisher: Michael Joseph (UK); Dodd, Mead (US)
- Publication date: 1969
- Publication place: United Kingdom
- Media type: Print

The Kites of War is a 1969 thriller novel by the British writer Derek Lambert. It is set on the Chinese-Indian frontier, where Lambert had worked as a foreign correspondent.

== Bibliography ==
- Burton, Alan. Historical Dictionary of British Spy Fiction. Rowman & Littlefield, 2016.
