= Rough Cut (1980 film) =

1980 film by Don Siegel

- Original theatrical poster
- Directed by: Don Siegel
- Screenplay by: Larry Gelbart
- Based on: Touch the Lion's Paw by Derek Lambert
- Produced by: David Merrick
- Starring: Burt Reynolds; Lesley-Anne Down; David Niven
- Cinematography: Freddie Young
- Edited by: Michael J. Duthie; Douglas Stewart
- Music by: Nelson Riddle
- Distributed by: Paramount Pictures
- Release date: June 19, 1980
- Running time: 111 minutes
- Country: United States
- Language: English
- Budget: $10 million
- Box office: $16,656,125 (domestic)

Rough Cut is a 1980 American heist film written by Larry Gelbart, directed by Don Siegel, and starring Burt Reynolds, Lesley-Anne Down and David Niven. It was based on the novel Touch the Lion's Paw (1975) by Derek Lambert.

== Plot ==
Jack Rhodes, a rich American living in London, attends a party and meets Gillian Bromley, an attractive woman who is also a thief. Rhodes observes Gillian stealing diamond jewelry from the house and later discovers Gillian hiding in his apartment. The two are attracted to one another and slowly begin a romantic relationship. Gillian confesses that she steals for the thrill, and also displays her skills at high speed driving.

Gillian is being coerced by Chief Inspector Willis, a veteran Scotland Yard detective who knows Jack is really a diamond thief and is determined to catch him before his impending retirement. Willis uses Gillian to feed Jack information regarding a shipment of uncut diamonds from London to Antwerp in order to bait Jack into stealing them so that he can capture him in the act. Jack however sees through Gillian's story regarding her source of information and exposes her, after which she tells Jack all about Willis and his plan to capture him.

Despite knowing about the setup, Jack recruits a team to help him steal the diamonds. He dislikes his initial choice of getaway driver, a mercenary living in Amsterdam, and recruits Gillian as replacement. On the eve of the robbery Jack confesses his love for Gillian. The robbery goes ahead as planned, Jack's team divert the private jet carrying the diamonds to Amsterdam, where he and Gillian intercept the shipment and escape following a high speed car chase. Meanwhile, Willis, who had travelled to Antwerp, discovers that a duplicate plane flown by Jack's team has delivered a package of worthless quartz and retires in disgrace.

Jack and Gillian are celebrating aboard a yacht when he reveals that the diamonds that they stole from Amsterdam were also quartz, switched for the real diamonds by Willis, who then joins them to negotiate the sale of the diamonds to Jack. Jack reveals that he and Willis had been working together all along, using Gillian as intermediary.

== Cast ==
- Burt Reynolds as Jack Rhodes
- Lesley-Anne Down as Gillian Bromley
- David Niven as Chief Inspector Cyril Willis
- Timothy West as Nigel Lawton
- Patrick Magee as Ernst Mueller
- Al Matthews as Ferguson
- Susan Littler as Sheila
- Joss Ackland as Inspector Vanderveld
- Isabel Dean as Mrs. Willis
- Wolf Kahler as De Gooyer
- Andrew Ray as Pilbrow
- Julian Holloway as Ronnie Taylor
- Douglas Wilmer as Maxwell Levy
- Geoffrey Russell as Tobin
- Ronald Hines as Captain Small
- David Howey as First Officer Palmer
- Frank Mills as Passport Clerk
- Roland Culver as Mr. Lloyd Palmer
- Alan Webb as Sir Samuel Sacks
- Cassandra Harris as Mrs. Lloyd Palmer
- Sue Lloyd as Female Guest
- Ron Pember as Taxi Driver
- Cyril Appleton as Police Driver

== Production ==
=== Development ===
The film was based on the novel, Touch the Lion's Paw published in 1975. The New York Times said "The book has a lot to offer, if only for the planning of the caper."

In 1977 it was announced Burt Reynolds would star in a film of the book called Rough Cut based on a script by Larry Gelbart, produced by David Merrick and directed by Blake Edwards. Reynolds and Merrick had worked together on Semi-Tough and Merrick asked the actor what sort of film he would like to do; Reynolds wanted to do a "homage" to Cary Grant. "Even if it didnt turn out well I'd get to throw away my Levis and cowboy hat and wear some decent clothes for a change," the actor said.

Gelbart said when he came on to the film another writer had already done a script and Merrick hired him at the request of Reynolds, who had writer and director approval, and was an admirer of Gelbart's. "My favourite writers have always come out of TV," said Reynolds. "They don't usually have ego problems and they're used to writing under the gun."

Gelbart wrote a draft of the script which Reynolds called "brilliant", but Blake Edwards did not like it and Gelbart was fired off the project in February 1978.

Then Edwards left the project. Gelbart says Reynolds wanted to push back production of the film to do Starting Over and Merrick agreed provided Reynolds give up writer and director approval. This was done. "I hope it was worth it," said Reynolds, "but I knew Starting Over would be important for me."

Merrick hired four other writers to work on the film. Then, at Reynolds' behest, Gelbart was rehired in June 1979. He did three more drafts in collaboration with Reynolds and new director Don Siegel. Siegel agreed to do the film because he was afraid of being typecast as an action director. "I thought I'd have a ball," he said.

=== Shooting ===
Filming began in London in August 1979. Siegel said at the time, "If I'd known Escape from Alcatraz was going to be such a success, I don't think I'd have done this picture. But because I love England I thought I'd have a go. But it's been a disaster since day one."

Siegel said the original book was "poor" and "we've had at least seven writers on it... It's not nearly as good as it should be and a great deal of work is needed to shore it up."

Siegel said "this picture is as big a departure" for Reynolds "as it is for me. It's more in the genre of a Cary Grant movie... Frankly I don't understand why Burt took this picture. He knew it needed a great deal of work."

"Merrick and Don are constantly running into each other" said Reynolds. "Every day I wonder what'll happen when those two meet."

"This is the worst prepared movie I've been involved with", said Siegel. "It'll take a miracle to bring it off. And unless Merrick helps us, that miracle will be an impossibility."

"I don't agree with that", said Reynolds. "Of course he hasn't made as many bad pictures as I have. I've had experiences that make this one look like Gone with the Wind."

Siegel was also unhappy with the title Rough Cut claiming that it would cause critics to make jokes about the film being a "rough cut". He pressed for Jack of Diamonds to be used instead but Merrick refused.

=== Firing of Siegel ===
Merrick fired Siegel several weeks into filming and hired British filmmaker Peter R. Hunt. Reynolds, an admirer of Siegel, was extremely unhappy with this. Blake Edwards flew in to discuss taking over, but wanted to rewrite the script. Eventually Reynolds helped persuade Merrick to rehire Siegel. "I've done more in three days than Henry Kissinger did in three years", said Reynolds, adding that "I'll never get myself in a situation like this again." Lesley-Anne Down called it "an interesting time." Anthony Shaffer was brought in to work on the script. Siegel did say he felt Reynolds was "marvelous, extremely inventive".

=== Endings ===
Just before the film unit went to Hawaii to shoot the ending, Reynolds asked Gelbart to write a new ending as a personal favor (Merrick refused to pay the writer). Gelbart did so. "It wasn't easy" he said because the film had changed so much. "I was writing the tail without having seen the donkey."

The new ending was shot. However the filmmakers were still dissatisfied. After seeing the film, Gelbart suggested another ending, with which Siegel agreed. Merrick did not want this, but Siegel insisted, and he had final cut.

Siegel filmed three endings, which Merrick refused to use, instead hiring another director, Robert Ellis Miller, to tack on his preferred ending.

According to Siegel's wife Carol Rydall, who also worked on the film, Merrick would agree to shoot sequences, then change his mind, then go back and agree to put them back in, annoying cast and crew.

Merrick used a rough cut of the film as collateral to raise money for his famed Broadway production of 42nd Street.

=== David Niven lawsuit ===
David Niven later sued Merrick for $1,791,000 claiming his likeness was not used in advertisements and publicity. He also said Merrick owed him $91,000.

"In my 46 years as an actor in more than 80 films", said Niven, "this is the first time I have ever been involved in a lawsuit. I have always lived up to my contractual obligations and have always paid my debts. David Merrick and Paramount have neither lived up to their contract with me nor honored their debt to me."

== Release and reception ==
Gelbart quipped, "as someone once said, all you've got to do with a Burt Reynolds picture is keep it in focus and it's bound to make you $50 million. However, the film proved to be a box office disappointment.

Roger Ebert gave the film 2.5 stars out of 4 and wrote, "It's fun, it's slick and it's carefully put together, but it's more of an exercise than an accomplishment. Everyone does their schtick, the plot complications unfold like clockwork, but we find ourselves not really caring." Variety declared, "Miraculously, all of the [production] difficulty does not result in a disjointed feeling in the picture. Problem instead seems to lie in much of the dialog, which comes across as wooden and contrived. Reynolds and Down do what they can to keep things going but their attempts at witty banter never appear natural." Vincent Canby of The New York Times wrote, "Once the movie gets into the caper itself, which occupies the last quarter of the picture, 'Rough Cut' suddenly acquires its identity as an action film, but it's nearly too late. By then we're on the point of losing interest. It's all that dreadful dialogue." Charles Champlin of the Los Angeles Times stated, "At its least, 'Rough Cut' is a sleek and featherweight care-lifter. At its best, it almost works as a caper to compare with the best of a genre." Larry Kart of the Chicago Tribune gave the film three stars out of four and called it "one of the most quirkily fascinating films to come along in some time." Gary Arnold of The Washington Post called the film "all too aptly titled", explaining that its "principal flaws are Don Siegel's stiff-jointed direction and a lackluster plot".

"I felt the picture was meant to be a parody, but I don't think it's broad enough", said Reynolds. "It went for something subtle that might have been too subtle. I really don't think it's clear enough, and it could have been a lot better. Compared to At Long Last Love it's just a masterpiece. You have to look at these things in perspective, after all."
