= Blackstone (novel) =

1972 novel

- Author: Derek Lambert
- Language: English
- Series: Edmund Blackstone
- Genre: Historical thriller
- Publisher: Methuen Publishing
- Publication date: 1972
- Publication place: United Kingdom
- Media type: Print
- Followed by: Blackstone's Fancy

Blackstone is a 1972 historical thriller novel by the British writer Derek Lambert, published under the pen name Richard Falkirk. It is the first in a series of novels featuring Edmund Blackstone, a member of the Bow Street Runners in the 1820s. Blackstone is assigned the job of protecting the young Princess Victoria, a task he initially considers a waste of time but which soon proves to be dangerous.

== Bibliography ==
- Burton, Alan. Historical Dictionary of British Spy Fiction. Rowman & Littlefield, 2016.
