= Angels in the Snow =

1969 novel

- Author: Derek Lambert
- Genre: Thriller
- Publisher: Michael Joseph
- Publication date: 1969
- Publication place: United Kingdom
- Media type: Print

Angels in the Snow is a 1969 thriller novel by the British writer Derek Lambert. It is set amongst the western community in the Soviet capital Moscow, mainly journalists and diplomats. Lambert was working as the Daily Express correspondent in Moscow at the time and had to smuggle the manuscript back to Britain. It was a critical and commercial success.

== Bibliography ==
- Burton, Alan. Historical Dictionary of British Spy Fiction. Rowman & Littlefield, 2016.
