= The Living (novel) =

1992 novel by Annie Dillard

- First edition
- Author: Annie Dillard
- Language: English
- Genre: Historical novel
- Publisher: HarperCollins
- Publication date: 1992
- Publication place: United States
- Media type: Print (hardback & paperback)
- Pages: 397 pp
- ISBN: 0-06-092411-X
- OCLC: 28180063

The Living is American author Annie Dillard's debut novel, a historical fiction account of European settlers and a group of Lummi natives in late 19th century Washington. The main action of the book takes place in the Puget Sound settlements of Whatcom, Old Bellingham, Sehome, and Fairhaven, which would later merge to form the city of Bellingham, Washington.

== Background ==
The Living was developed from a short story Dillard wrote 15 years prior.

As research for the novel, Dillard lived for five years in the Bellingham area, much of that time in 19th-century era accommodations. During that time, she did not read anything published after 1883. She read a memoir by a dressmaker, which helped her with period-appropriate clothing.

Dillard found it easy to write the novel from the perspective of the settlers but found writing about the Chinese-Americans, Chinese immigrants, and Indigenous peoples of the area more difficult. To research the Indigenous peoples, she talked to Lummi Salish individuals and read about Skagit peoples (now identified in upper and lower tribes). To learn more about the Chinese people of the time, she read secondary sources, as well as a "master's thesis on the expulsion of the Chinese from Bellingham." She also "used the American-history collection at Yale, and twice ... went to Washington State ... [and] bought up a whole bunch of books."

== Reception ==
According to the Encyclopædia Britannica, "reviewers found in its depictions of the logging culture of the turn-of-the-20th-century Pacific Northwest the same visionary realism that distinguished the author’s nonfiction."

The novel received a starred review from Kirkus Reviews, who wrote, "As usual in Dillard's work, sparkling prose and striking insights abound, though a tendency toward overdescription, plus a certain emotional distance from her many characters ... take some of the power out of her punch. Otherwise: a triumph of narrative skill and faithful research—headed for success."

The New York Times's Thomas Keneally noted that Dillard has a "tremendous gift for writing in a genuinely epic mode." He also highlighted how the novel's action "is cyclical, returning again and again to events, imbuing them with poignancy. The wealth of cherished detail is met in full by a wealth of cherished character. No fake suspense in Annie Dillard's writing. Instead the same incident enriches us over and over again." He concluded by saying, "The Living is an august celebration of human frenzy and endurance."

Mary Cantwell, also writing for The New York Times, wrote that "the language of The Living is indeed free of whorls and ridges. Puget Sound, for example, 'was the rough edge of the world, where the trees came smack down to the stones. The shore looked . . . as if the corner of the continent had got torn off right here, sometime near yesterday, and the dark trees kept on growing like nothing happened. The ocean just filled in the tear and settled down."

Clif Mason, writing for Western American Literature, started his review by stating, "The Living is, without doubt, one of the two or three books with which Annie Dillard’s name will automatically be associated long into the future; it is, both stylistically and intellectually, the culmination of everything that she has done before." After reviewing themes and comparing Dillard's style to other authors, Mason noted that "If The Living is to be faulted, it is for its plain, Flaubertian prose style ... a style that places a premium on exposition and drastically limits dialogue. In my view, this unnecessarily impedes the reader’s progress through the novel. We read page after page of exposition, watch details accrete and accrete ..., and hunger for the dialogue that could infuse the novel with drama and quicken the pace." He concludes by stating, "However, this is a debatable flaw, a minor one. The Living bears the stamp of genius. It should be read by ... everyone ... who cares about the novel as an art form."
