= Royal Jordanian Falcons =

- Royal Jordanian Falcons logo
- Active: 1976
- Country: Hashemite Kingdom of Jordan
- Garrison/HQ: Aqaba Airport
- Patron: Royal Jordanian Airlines, Royal Jordanian Air Force
- Colors: Red and Grey (team's name written by golden color)
- Website: rjfalcons.com

Aircraft flown
- Trainer: Extra EA330LX

The Royal Jordanian Falcons (صقور الأردن الملكية) is the national aerobatic demonstration team of the Hashemite Kingdom of Jordan.

The team was formed on the orders of King Hussein of Jordan in 1976. It was initially led by American pilots Paul Warsaw, Dave Rahm and Steve Wolf, but Rahm was killed in a 1976 crash during a performance in front of Hussein.

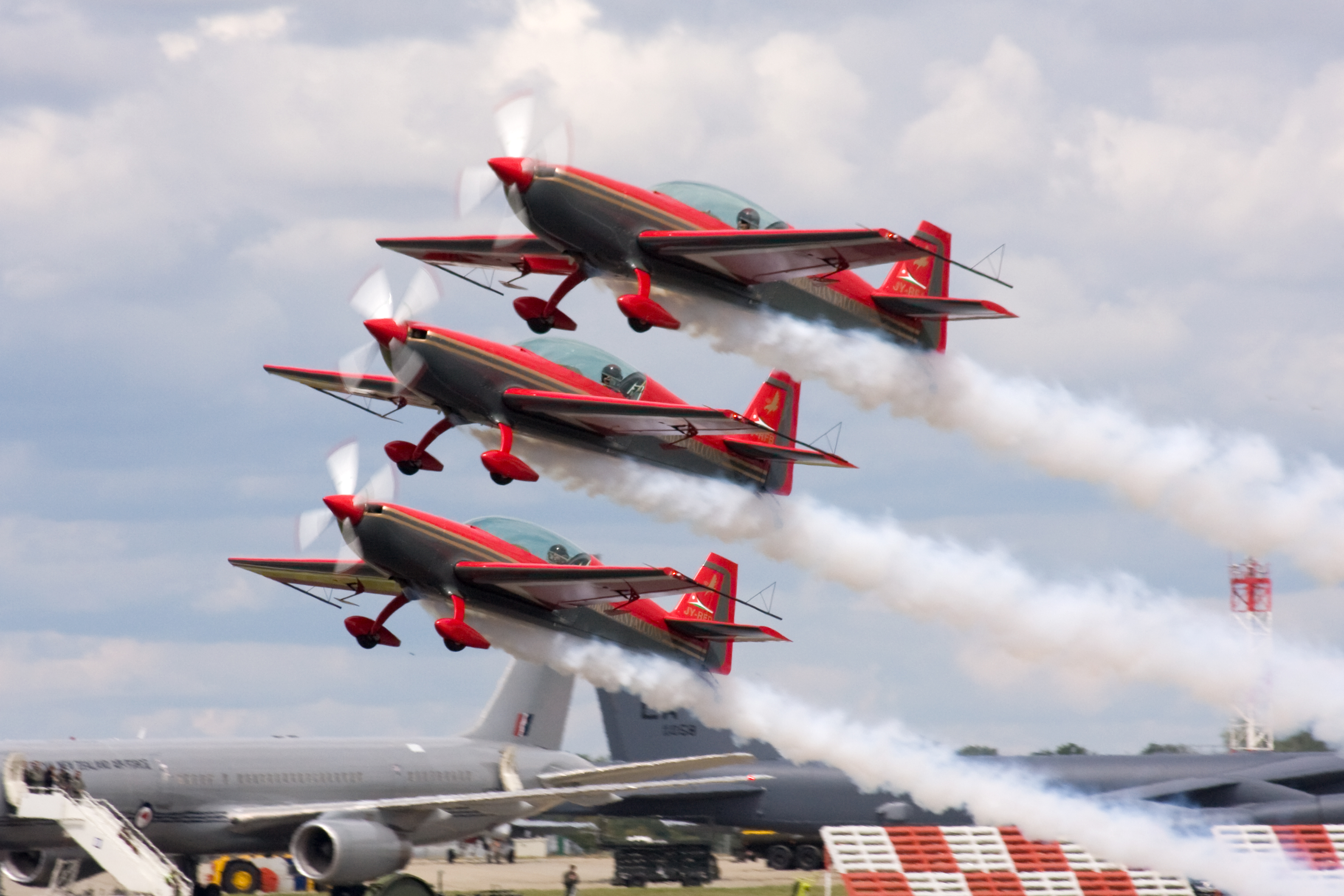
The Royal Jordanian Falcons in 2009.

The team used two and subsequently three Pitts S-2A Specials before changing to Walter Extra EA300s in 1992. Later, in 2007, the team's fleet was upgraded, the older Extra 300s were replaced by Extra 300Ls. The team displays with four aircraft and has a fifth as a backup. In 2018, the team switched to the Extra 330LX, replacing the older Extra 300L trainer aircraft.

The team was formerly based at Amman Civil Airport, but has since moved to Aqaba Airport, also known as King Hussein International Airport.

The Falcons are unusual in that the team is a joint military-civil venture. The pilots are all Royal Jordanian Air Force personnel and are selected competitively from the top RJAF pilots, to join the team for a 3–4 year posting. For the majority of the team's existence it has had five pilots and three to four engineers for each given season. The aircraft, however, are owned and maintained by Royal Jordanian Airlines.

The Royal Jordanian Falcons aim to promote interest in Jordan and its culture and to advance international goodwill. The Falcons have displayed at air shows and events in Europe, North America, Asia and North Africa. At a number of air shows they achieved various accolades, including winning the Royal International Air Tattoo's Cannestra Trophy (best overseas flying demonstration) three times.

== Royal Jordanian Falcons team ==
As of 2021

- Maj. Riyad Ayyoub (general manager)
- Maj. Ghazi Sadoun (director of operations)
- Capt. Sharif Hatouq (chief pilot)
- Capt. Jamil Zayyad (formation leader)
- Maj. Tamer Majali (left wing)
- Maj. Ahmad Al-Rababa’h (right wing)
- Capt. Doraid Al-Lawama (solo/slot)
- Doraid Lawama (coach)
- Chief Eng. Riziq Haddad (chief of maintenance)
- Eng. Thaer Al Shoufi (engineer)
- Eng. Mohammad Malhas (engineer)
- Eng. Bassam Rahamneh (engineer)
- Khaled Sakarneh (engineer)
