= Quinx =

1985 novel by Lawrence Durrell

- First edition
- Author: Lawrence Durrell
- Language: English
- Series: The Avignon Quintet
- Publisher: Faber & Faber (UK)
- Publication date: 1985
- Publication place: United Kingdom
- Media type: Print (Hardback & Paperback)
- Pages: 201 p.
- ISBN: 0-571-13444-0
- OCLC: 13396286
- Dewey Decimal: 823/.912 19
- LC Class: PR6007.U76 Q5 1985b
- Preceded by: Sebastian

Quinx, or The Ripper's Tale is the 5th and final volume in Lawrence Durrell's "quincunx" of novels, The Avignon Quintet, published from 1974 to 1985. It explores the activities of Constance, Aubrey Blanford, Robin Sutcliffe, Lord Galen, and most of the other surviving characters (including some who are theoretically fictional from Blanford's novel) as they return to Avignon and Provence in the immediate aftermath of World War II.

== Plot summary ==
The surviving characters include "two novelists, a psychoanalyst, a German double agent, a Cambridge-educated gypsy, a Jewish lord, a schizophrenic young woman and an Egyptian prince."

The ex-Nazi double agent Smirgel provides information about the location of the Templar treasure, which has long been sought by Lord Galen. Gypsies are congregating to take part in a Camargue festival. The climax of the book is set below the Pont du Gard, an ancient Roman monument where the characters expect to find the treasure.

Durrell develops further in this novel the process of deliberate breakdown of logical narrative, which he has used throughout the series. Time sequences are often contradictory, and there are numerous anachronistic references to events during and after World War II. More than in the previous four volumes, Durrell deliberately includes allusions and homages to the culture of the 1980s in a narrative which is supposedly occurring in 1946.

== Reception ==
In reviewing Quinx, Patrick Parrinder in the London Review of Books surveys the entire quintet, saying that

"This series of novels-with-two-titles, containing characters with variable names and fluctuating identities, is (as we should expect) suffused with radical ambiguity. The ‘Avignon Quintet’ which Durrell has now completed is an enigmatic and secretive work, a cluster of dark passages and gaudy treasure-filled caves beside the thrusting baroque edifice of his earlier ‘Alexandria Quartet’."

He describes his art as "undiminished in scale, in inventive gusto and fictive extravagance", with a "shrewd eye for the sensational." He describes it as a "deliberate romance," set around the search for a Holy Grail, the treasure of the Templars.

Barbara Fisher Williamson in the New York Times describes "the interminable opening religio-literary-sexual-psycho babble of the two novelists" before the plot gets underway. In a novel in which patterns dissolve and the characters' belief systems fail, making what she says is "a long joke of a book." She praises Durrell's descriptions, saying that "Avignon, ancient city of kings and popes, comes gloriously alive. The physical pleasures are the only ones that can be counted on in this world of teleological frustration."

Williamson finds that Durrell summarizes his work in these closing sentences: "As the narrator says toward the end, 'There is no meaning and we falsify the truth about reality in adding one. The universe is playing, the universe is only improvising!' "
