= Constance (novel) =

Novel by Lawrence Durrell

- First edition
- Author: Lawrence Durrell
- Language: English
- Series: The Avignon Quintet
- Publisher: Faber & Faber (UK)
- Publication date: 1982
- Publication place: Great Britain
- Media type: Print (Hardback & Paperback)
- Pages: 393 p. (Faber edition)
- ISBN: 0-571-11757-0 (hardback edition)
- OCLC: 9854630
- Dewey Decimal: 823/.912 19
- LC Class: PR6007.U76 C6 1982b
- Preceded by: Livia
- Followed by: Sebastian

Constance, or Solitary Practices is the central volume of the five novels of Lawrence Durrell's The Avignon Quintet, published from 1974 to 1985. It was nominated for the Booker Prize in 1982. Involving some of the characters from the preceding Livia, the novel also introduces new ones. It is set before and during World War II, in France, Egypt, Poland and Switzerland.

== Plot summary ==
The novel is set in the period from the outbreak of World War II in 1939 with the Nazi invasion of Poland, to the Allied invasion of Normandy in June 1944. Its settings include Avignon, France; Geneva, Switzerland; Poland, and Egypt.

The first chapter continues in Avignon, where the previous novel, Livia, was set. It details Constance's blossoming relationship with her husband Sam. As the clouds of war loom, a group of Europeans is breaking up whose last summer together was explored in Livia. Novelist Aubrey Blanford takes a post in Egypt, kindly offered to him by Prince Hassad. During a visit there from Sam, now a soldier, a picnic trip ends in disaster as the party comes under friendly fire. Sam is killed and Blanford crippled in the attack.

Constance moves to Geneva in neutral Switzerland. There she learns of Sam's death. Eventually Constance decides to return to France, where the Vichy regime rules over Provence and the south of France after the Nazi defeat of the country and occupation of Paris and the north. She lives in the big house of Tu Duc, where Livia returns. Disfigured by the loss of an eye (the reasons for which are not given until Quinx, the last novel of the quintet), Livia commits suicide.

Constance returns to Geneva, where she embarks on a passionate affair with the Prince's aide Sebastian Affad. Affad returns to Alexandria and to disgrace amongst his Gnostic sect for his adventure with Constance in Geneva. It is at this point in the book that Durrell begins to introduce 'fictional' characters from Monsieur, the first in the quintent, including its author, the novelist Robin Sutcliffe, himself a fictional invention of Blanford's. Not only does Sutcliffe appear in 'real life', but so too does Bruce Drexel, another character from Monsieur. Alongside this, a number of characters from The Alexandria Quartet make 'cameo' appearances, including British Ambassador David Mountolive, intelligence officer Maskelyne, the gnostic Balthazar, the novelist Pursewarden and the dancer Melissa, who sleeps with Sebastian Affad and is rewarded with three cigars to gift her Jewish patron and lover.

== Reception ==
The novel was short-listed for the 1982 Booker Prize.

American critic John Leonard, writing for The New York Times, was highly critical of Durrell's work in this novel and the previous two books of the Quintet so far: "For a novelist like Mr. Durrell, almost any idea is incapacitating, an excuse to abandon his lyric impulse and resort to old, lazy tricks, like one writer talking to another or confiding in his notebook or finding fragments of a third writer's diary. ... Three books into his Gnostic quincunx, one longs for either amnesia or the stake.

Memory - 'a dog on your back gnawing at your eyeballs' - is Mr. Durrell's real subject, but so far, sad to report, Proust has nothing to worry about."
