= Blackstone on Broadway =

1977 novel

- Author: Derek Lambert
- Language: English
- Series: Edmund Blackstone
- Genre: Historical thriller
- Publisher: Methuen Publishing
- Publication date: 1977
- Publication place: United Kingdom
- Media type: Print
- Preceded by: Blackstone Underground

Blackstone on Broadway is a 1977 historical thriller novel by the British writer Derek Lambert, published under the pen name Richard Falkirk. It is the final entry in a series of six novels featuring Edmund Blackstone, a member of the Bow Street Runners in the pre-Victorian era. Blackstone is assigned to assist the New York City police force, but has his own schemes to pursue while there.

== Bibliography ==
- Bill Pronzini & Marcia Muller. 1001 Midnights: The Aficionado's Guide to Mystery and Detective Fiction. Arbor House, 1986.
