= The Maytrees =

2007 novel by Annie Dillard

- First edition cover
- Author: Annie Dillard
- Language: English
- Genre: Novel
- Publisher: HarperCollins
- Publication date: June 12, 2007
- Publication place: United States
- Media type: Print (Hardcover)
- Pages: 224 pp
- ISBN: 0-06-123953-4
- OCLC: 76786885
- Dewey Decimal: 813/.54 22
- LC Class: PS3554.I398 M39 2007

The Maytrees is American author Annie Dillard's second novel, a fictional account of the lives of Toby and Lou Maytree in Provincetown, MA, from the time of courting to old age.

== Plot introduction ==
Literate Provincetown bohemians Toby and Lou Maytree meet and marry, have a son, and begin to grow old before Toby decides to leave for Maine to build a new life with a family friend. Toby and Lou remain estranged as the book follows both characters through life's progress: Lou raises their son and Toby and Deary develop a successful business. When Deary falls ill and Toby loses his ability to care for her, the families are reunited.

== Reception ==
Michelle Green, writing for the New York Times, praises the novel as a beautifully written one about love, betrayal, loss, and reconciliation. Daniel Smith in Slate describes the novel as one of her most successful and accessible works, "a slim, poetic novel" in which Dillard's philosophical reflections on life and nature are grounded in the mundane life of a couple. He compares Dillard with "a latter-day Henry David Thoreau".
