= This Passionate Land =

1979 novel by Hal Bennett

- First edition
- Author: Hal Bennett
- Language: English
- Publisher: Signet Books
- Publication place: United States

This Passionate Land is a 1979 romantic novel written by Hal Bennett, under the pen name of Harriet Janeway.
