= Livia (novel) =

1978 novel by Lawrence Durrell

Livia: Or Buried Alive
- Cover of the first edition
- Author: Lawrence Durrell
- Language: English
- Series: The Avignon Quintet
- Publisher: Faber & Faber
- Publication date: 1978
- Publication place: London, England, United Kingdom
- Media type: Print (Hardback & Paperback)
- Pages: 265
- ISBN: 978-0-571-11297-5
- OCLC: 4340729
- Dewey Decimal: 823.912
- LC Class: PZ3.D9377 Li PR6007.U76
- Preceded by: Monsieur
- Followed by: Constance

Livia: Or Buried Alive (1978), is the second volume in British author Lawrence Durrell's The Avignon Quintet, published from 1974 to 1985. Durrell has described the novels as "roped together like climbers on a rockface, but all independent [...] a series of books through which the same characters move for all the world as if to illustrate the notion of reincarnation." The description of this form for the quintet actually appears in Livia. The first novel of the quincunx (the 'figurative shape' of five used on a die or playing card), Monsieur, received the James Tait Black Memorial Prize in 1974.

== Plot summary ==
The key protagonist in Livia is novelist Aubrey Blanford, introduced as a character 50 pages before the end of the first novel of the quintet, Monsieur. Blanford travels to Avignon to stay with his fellow Oxford students Sam and Hilary, whose sister has inherited the broken-down chateau of Tu Duc. They embark on an idyllic boat trip to the chateau and then on the restoration of the property.

With Monsieur now revealed as the fictional work of Rob Sutcliffe, a writer invented by Blanford as his alter ego, it is in Livia we meet the 'real-life' characters behind Sutcliffe/Blanford's fictional creations. Like Monsieur, Livia opens with a death—that of Constance, who lived on in Blanford's mind (as 'Tu') at the end of Monsieur. Livia in fact predates Monsieur—effectively a 'prequel'—and is set in Provence before World War II, with the outbreak of war taking place as the novel closes on the great debauch, or 'spree' hosted by the Egyptian Prince Hassad. The events in Livia take place in the increasing atmosphere of impending war, with the group of young friends at Tu Duc enjoying a last summer before the encroachment of Nazism. They befriend Lord Galen, a Jewish financier who has sponsored a search for the lost treasure of the Templars by the French clerk Quatrefages. Galen, a business partner and friend of Prince Hassad, travels to Germany and is convinced by Adolf Hitler to invest in his plans (including that for a national home for the Jews) later realises his mistake when he and Hassad escape Germany barely with their lives and tremendous financial loss.

Redolent of Durrell's temporal sleight of hand in the Alexandria Quartet, Livia effectively retells the story of Monsieur (a fiction) from a new point of view but involving basically the same set of characters and relationships—albeit now rooted in 'reality'. The Quintet, in this way, is "the Kunstlerroman of Aubrey Blanford much the way as the Quartet was that of Darley." Where Monsieur revolved around the romantically entwined Piers de Nogaret, his sister Sylvie and her husband Bruce Drexel, Livia revolves around Blanford, Livia and her sister Constance. In Livia, Blanford is married to the bisexual/lesbian Livia (in Monsieur Sutcliffe is married to the bisexual/lesbian Pia) but has a longstanding affair with her sister Constance.

Blanford's fictional creation, author Robin Sutcliffe, again plays a major role in Livia and it is in Livia we learn that the single word titles of the five books are Blanford's choice, while the alternative titles are Sutcliffe's preference. On two occasions in Livia, however, characters from Monsieur make cameo appearances: when Blanford meets Sylvie at the asylum where Lord Galen's former business partner is incarcerated and when Pia sends Sigmund Freud's consulting couch home after the sack of his office in Vienna. Its appearance at Tu Duc has Constance asking Blandford whether, in fact, Sutcliffe was a fiction.

As with much of Durrell's other fictional work, the novel relies heavily on references to archival materials: correspondence, notebooks, fragments and drafts, which are used to free the novel from the form of a closed medium. Durrell was keenly aware of academic interest in such materials and himself enthusiastically sold such marginalia to collectors.

=== Structure ===
If Monsieur was a novel, academics have argued, Livia is Blanford's literary biography—part of a whole organised into a form inspired by Cambodia's Angkor Wat—in fact Sutcliffe refers to the "five coned towers that form a quincunx". Livia continues to explore the themes of gnosticism that are core to Monsieur and embarks on a search for the lost treasure of the Templars and for the Philosopher's Stone.

Scholarly analysis of the shape and form of the quintet has also sought parallels with tantrism, examining the idea—explored by Durrell in Livia—of 'Metareality', the juxtaposition of the constructed reality of the book and material reality. It was during the writing of Livia (as Monsieur was being prepared for publication) that Durrell is said to have conceived the structure of the quintet and he attempted to retrospectively change the content of Monsieur prior to its first US publication.

In speaking to Sutcliffe, his fictional creation, Blanford says: “The books would be roped together like climbers on a rockface, but they would all be independent. The relation of the caterpillar to the butterfly, the tadpole to the frog. An organic relation.”

=== Livia ===
The character of Livia alone has attracted significant attention, with Button and Reed acknowledging, "In her depiction, Durrell's genius thus succeeds in locating the elemental conflicts lurking beneath the surface of a troubled woman's psyche... This is no small achievement for an author whose aversion to women might just as easily have limited his ability to understand them." Durrell frequently describes Livia as cold and reptilian and has her enthusiastically embracing Nazism. When Blanford is driven to flogging her with a dog whip, she is sexually satisfied, thanking him and licking his shoes. The scene is one of a number of allusions to Sadism made in Livia, Durrell noting in the book that de Sade was a Provençal resident.

Durrell's daughter Sappho believed herself to be the inspiration behind the 'monstrous' character of Livia, a lesbian born out of a coupling between an occidental and an oriental, who commits suicide by hanging herself. Sappho Durrell herself committed suicide by hanging in 1985.

== Reception ==
Critic Alastair Forbes in the New York Times wrote, "If in Livia he [Durrell] seems scarcely up to form, much of his writing — not least his jokes and puns, both good and bad — can still give its customary pleasure." The Washington Post noted Durrell "is often an infuriating writer, shockingly self-indulgent," although also points out his ideas are never dull and that Durrell has perhaps "pulled off the most interesting trick of all and made even the reader one of his own fictional creations." William Henscher, writing of Livia in The Guardian, refers to "outbreaks of frankly enraged class war. When the narrator says "the valet looked like the lower-class ferret he was", an ugly conviction is clearly breaking through a character's speech."
