= The Saint Peter's Plot =

1978 novel

- First edition
- Author: Derek Lambert
- Language: English
- Genre: Thriller
- Publisher: Arlington Books
- Publication date: 1978
- Publication place: United Kingdom
- Media type: Print

The Saint Peter's Plot is a 1978 thriller novel by the British writer Derek Lambert. During the closing stage of the Second World War, the Nazis hatch a plot to save their leaders from disaster.

== Bibliography ==
- Burton, Alan. Historical Dictionary of British Spy Fiction. Rowman & Littlefield, 2016.
