= Blackstone Underground =

1976 novel

- Author: Derek Lambert
- Language: English
- Series: Edmund Blackstone
- Genre: Historical thriller
- Publisher: Methuen Publishing
- Publication date: 1976
- Publication place: United Kingdom
- Media type: Print
- Preceded by: Blackstone and the Scourge of Europe
- Followed by: Blackstone on Broadway

Blackstone Underground is a 1976 historical thriller novel by the British writer Derek Lambert, published under the pen name Richard Falkirk. It is the fifth in a series of six novels featuring Edmund Blackstone, a member of the Bow Street Runners in the pre-Victorian era. While trying to decide how to rescue a boy sentenced to death from Newgate Prison, Blackstone is called upon to thwart a gang plotting to rob the Bank of England.

== Bibliography ==
- Bill Pronzini & Marcia Muller. 1001 Midnights: The Aficionado's Guide to Mystery and Detective Fiction. Arbor House, 1986.
