= Jacques Lacarrière =

French writer

- Born: December 2, 1925; Limoges, France
- Died: September 17, 2005 (aged 79); Paris
- Occupations: prominent critic, journalist, essayist

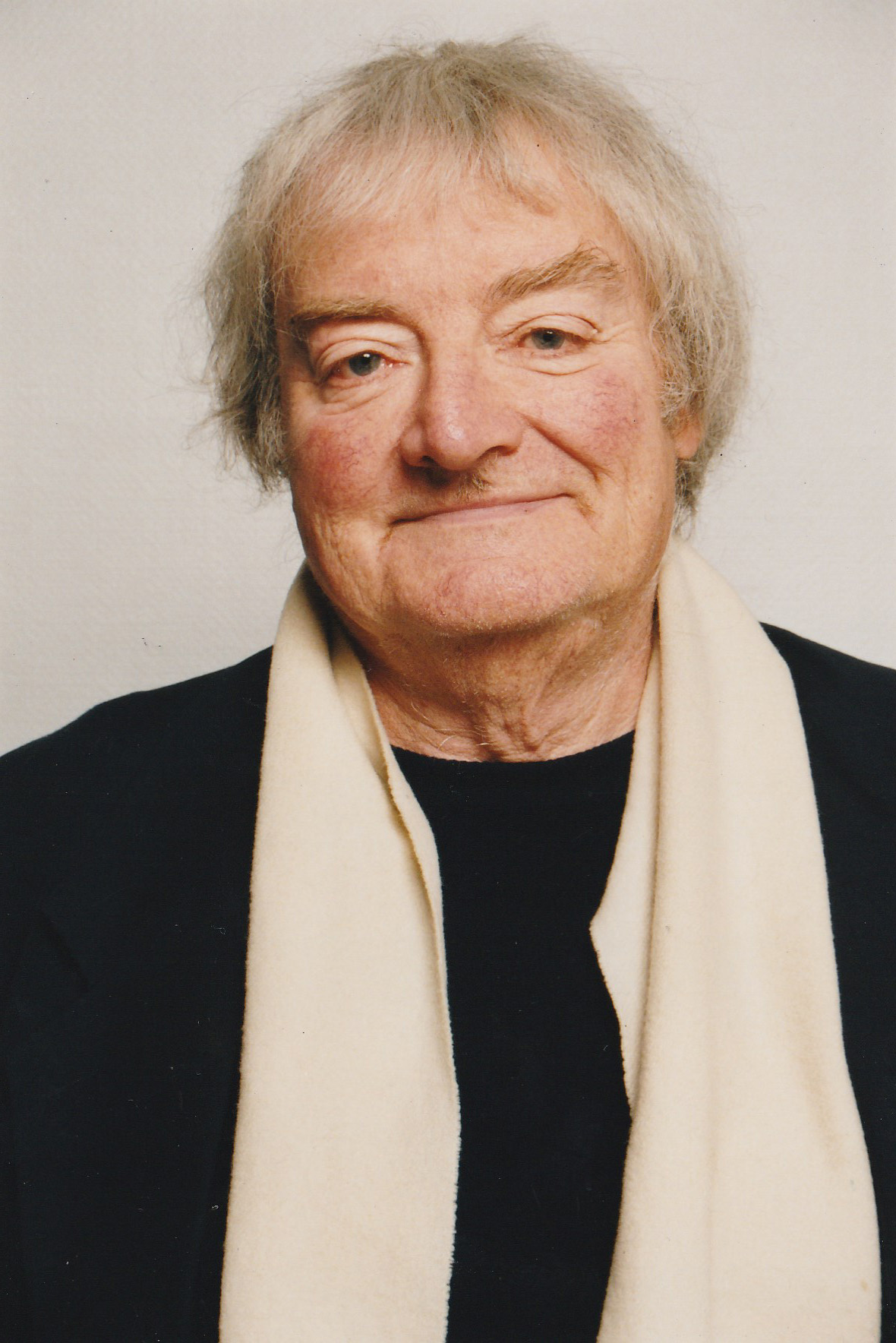
Jacques Lacarrière, 1998

Jacques Lacarrière (French: [lakaʁjɛʁ]; 2 December 1925 – 17 September 2005) was a French writer, born in Limoges. He studied moral philosophy, classical literature, and Hindu philosophy and literature. Professionally, he was known as a prominent critic, journalist, and essayist.

== Biography ==
A passionate admirer of ancient Greece and its mythology, Lacarrière wrote about it extensively. His essay L'été grec (Greek Summer) was an immense popular success. His classical works Maria of Egypt and Dictionnaire amoureux de la Grèce (Dictionary for one who loves Greece) were also successes.

Of interest to ethnographers and ecologists is his Chemin faisant: Mille kilomètres à pied à travers la France (1974, On the way: One thousand kilometers by foot across France). It was based on his walking across France in 1971, when he kept to small roads and byways, stopping at villages. Beginning in August, he traveled from Saverne in the Vosges, reaching Leucate in November, which is located in the Corbières. It was reprinted by Fayard in 1997 with a postscript entitled "Memory of roads," and addition of selected letters from readers. It was released again in 2014, again by Fayard.

Lacarrière's 1973 literary essay, Les Gnostiques, is well respected for its insights into the early Christian religious movement of Gnosticism. The writer had met English author Lawrence Durrell in 1971, who had been studying some Gnostic texts since the early 1940s. Durrell featured Gnosticism as a plot element in the novels of his The Avignon Quintet (1974 to 1985). He also wrote a "Foreword" to the 1974 English translation of Lacarrière's essay. He was Correspondent Member of Greek Writers Association “Unifying Process of Authors". For the whole of his work, in 1991 Lacarrière was awarded le Grand Prix de l'Académie française (the Great Prize of the French Academy).

He died in Paris on 17 September 2005, following complications from orthopedic surgery. His body was cremated and his ashes scattered in Greece, in the waters off the island of Spetses.

== Works ==
=== In French ===
- Les Hommes ivres de Dieu (Men drunk with God), Arthaud 1961, Fayard 1975, (rééd. Seuil, Coll. Sagesses, 1983)
- Les Gnostiques, 1973, Idées Gallimard (rééd. Albin Michel, Coll. Spiritualités Vivantes Poche, 1998)
- Chemin faisant, mille kilomètres à pied à travers la France d'aujourd'hui, 1974 (rééd. 1983, Fayard)
- L’été grec : une Grèce quotidienne de 4 000 ans, 1976, Plon, Paris
- Promenades dans la Grèce antique, 1978, guide Hachette (éd. commentée et ill. des Voyages de Pausanias le Périégète)
- En cheminant avec Hérodote, 1981, Seghers (rééd. 1982 par Hachette, coll. Pluriel ISBN 2-01-008771-2)
- Marie d’Égypte, 1983 (rééd. 1999 Collection Points-Seuil)
- Au cœur des Mythologies, en suivant les Dieux, 1984, Hachette, coll. Pluriel ISBN 2-01-278888-2 (rééd. 1998, éd. Folio, ISBN 2-01-012112-0)
- Ce bel aujourd'hui, 1989, Jean-Claude Lattès
- Dictionnaire amoureux de la Grèce, Plon, collection Dictionnaire amoureux, 2001, ISBN 978-2-259-19076-3
- La Poussière du monde, Nil Éditions, 1997
- Lexique érotique de la Grèce, Plon, 2003
- La Grèce des Hommes, Jacques Lacarrière & Emanuel Sanz, Editions Livre Total SA, Lausanne (Suisse), Luce Wilquin éditrice Dour, 1994, ISBN 2-88161-064-1 (épuisé)

=== Translated into English ===
- The God-Possessed, London: George Allen & Unwin LTD, 1963.
- Men Possessed By God. The Story of the Desert Monks of Ancient Christendom, Garden City, NY: Doubleday & Co, 1964.
- The Gnostics, San Francisco, CA: City Lights Books, 1989.(ISBN 0872862437)
- The Wisdom of Ancient Greece (Wisdom Of Series), edited, NY: Abbeville Press, 1996. (ISBN 0789202433)
