= The Man Who Was Saturday =

1985 novel

- First edition (US)
- Author: Derek Lambert
- Language: English
- Genre: Thriller
- Publisher: Hamish Hamilton (UK); Stein and Day (US)
- Publication date: 1985
- Publication place: United Kingdom
- Media type: Print

The Man Who Was Saturday is a 1985 thriller novel by the British writer Derek Lambert. An American defector to the Soviet Union schemes to return home against the best efforts of the KGB.

== Bibliography ==
- Nancy-Stephanie Stone. A Reader's Guide to the Spy and Thriller Novel. G.K. Hall, 1997.
