= Dave Rahm =

American geologist, professor and stunt pilot

David Allen Rahm
- Dave Rahm
- Born: 1931
- Died: 1976 (aged 44–45); Amman, Jordan
- Occupations: Geologist, professor, stunt pilot
- Mother: Hilda
- Relatives: sons - Steve and Brian, adopted son, Ronald Bruce

David Rahm (1931–1976), nicknamed "the Flying Professor", was an American geologist, professor and stunt pilot. He taught at Western Washington State University and was a visiting professor of geology at the University of Jordan. Rahm lived in Anacortes, Washington.

Rahm met King Hussein of Jordan in 1974 at the Abbotsford Air Show in British Columbia. Hussein asked him to come to Jordan and train the Royal Jordanian Falcons aerobatics team. Rahm was killed in a crash in the summer of 1976 while performing with co-display pilot, Steve Wolf in Amman, Jordan.

Rahm died performing a dual routine with Steve Wolf of a Hammerhead maneuver in an S2 Pitts Special. Rahm's wife, Katy Rahm, and King Hussein were both present.

Writer Annie Dillard wrote an essay about Rahm called "The Stunt Pilot", reprinted as the last chapter of her collection, The Writing Life. Rahm's widow later wrote a memoir, Flying High: Soaring Above the Tragedies of Life.
