= I, Said the Spy =

1980 novel

- First edition
- Author: Derek Lambert
- Language: English
- Genre: Thriller
- Publisher: Arlington
- Publication date: 1980
- Publication place: United Kingdom
- Media type: Print

I, Said the Spy is a 1980 thriller novel by the British writer Derek Lambert.

== Bibliography ==
- Burton, Alan. Historical Dictionary of British Spy Fiction. Rowman & Littlefield, 2016.
