= The Killing House (novel) =

1997 novel

- First edition
- Author: Derek Lambert
- Language: English
- Genre: Thriller
- Publisher: Piatkus Books
- Publication date: 1997
- Publication place: United Kingdom
- Media type: Print

The Killing House is a 1997 thriller novel. It is the final novel of the British writer Derek Lambert and features a plot set against the backdrop of the Northern Irish peace process.

== Bibliography ==
- Burton, Alan. Historical Dictionary of British Spy Fiction. Rowman & Littlefield, 2016.
