= The Judas Code =

1983 novel

- First edition
- Author: Derek Lambert
- Language: English
- Genre: Thriller
- Publisher: Hamish Hamilton
- Publication date: 1983
- Publication place: United Kingdom
- Media type: Print

The Judas Code is a 1983 thriller novel by the British writer Derek Lambert. During the Second World War in neutral Lisbon, British intelligence work to try and lure Nazi Germany and the Soviet Union into a vicious attritional war with each other.

== Bibliography ==
- Nancy-Stephanie Stone. A Reader's Guide to the Spy and Thriller Novel. G.K. Hall, 1997.
