= The Red Dove =

1982 novel

- First edition
- Author: Derek Lambert
- Language: English
- Genre: Thriller
- Publisher: Sphere Books
- Publication date: 1982
- Publication place: United Kingdom
- Media type: Print

The Red Dove is a 1982 thriller novel by the British writer Derek Lambert.

== Bibliography ==
- Nancy-Stephanie Stone. A Reader's Guide to the Spy and Thriller Novel. G.K. Hall, 1997.
