= Wait Until the Evening =

1974 novel by Hal Bennett

Wait Until The Evening
- Cover of original hardcover
- Author: Hal Bennett
- Language: English
- Publication place: United States

Wait Until The Evening is a novel by Hal Bennett published in 1974. It was the follow-up to his award-winning novel Lord of Dark Places.
