= Carlos Be =

Spanish writer

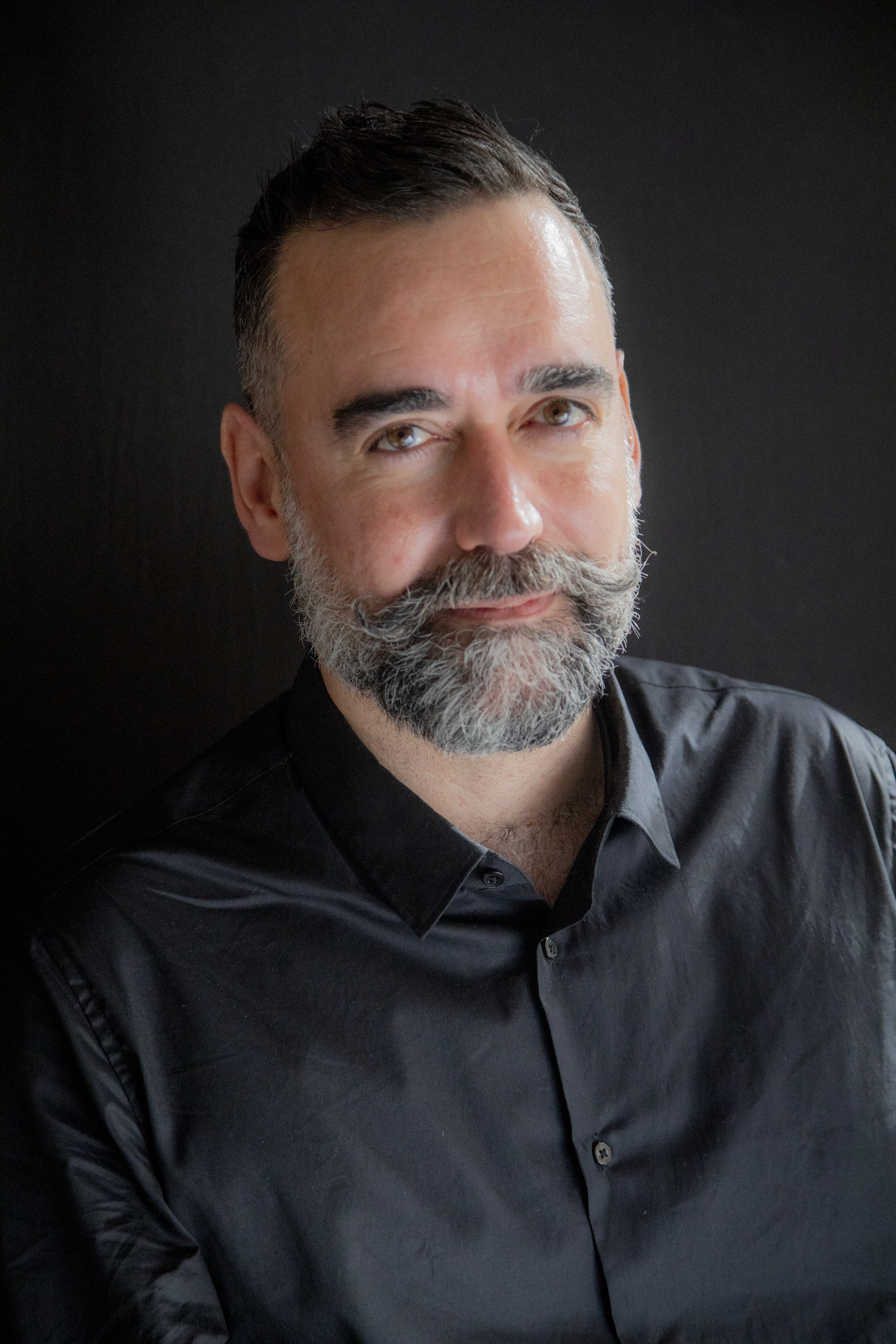
- Carlos Be in 2022
- Born: 4 November 1974 (age 51); Vilanova i la Geltrú, Barcelona, Spain
- Occupations: Writer; Playwright; Theatre director
- Known for: Playwriting

Carlos Be (born in Vilanova i la Geltrú, Barcelona, 4 November 1974) is a Spanish author and theater director, as well as a founding member of the theater companies The Zombie Company and La Casa Be. His works have been premiered in Bolivia, Chile, Colombia, Spain, the United States, Italy, Mexico, Panama, the Czech Republic and Venezuela, and have been translated into Czech, Slovak, English, Italian, Polish, Portuguese and Ukrainian. In March 2019, he receives the XIX Marco Antonio Ettedgui International Award for his artistic career from the Rajatabla Foundation of Venezuela.

== Biography ==
Carlos Be became a playwright at age 22, when in 1997 he decided to quit a medical degree program to devote himself to writing on a full-time basis.

Critics considers him "one of the main protagonists of this madrileña moved theater that is being lived in recent years" (Julio Bravo, ABC), "the enfant terrible of Madrid theater" (José Luis Romo, El Mundo) and "an author ignored in the commercial circuit, but called to larger companies" (Javier Villán, El Mundo).

As a theater author, he has published, among other works, 25 Noel Road: a genius like us (Caja España Theater Award 2001), The extraordinary death of Ulrike M. (finalist of the Casa de América Award - Festival Escena Contemporánea de Dramaturgia Innovadora 2005), Amen (2006), Origami (2006 Borne Theater Award), Chicory (2008), It's raining cows (2008), The Pilcik box (Serantes Theater Award 2008), The injured child (2009), Exhumation (2012), Fish tanks (2015), Die, Numancia, die (2015), The kindness of Margherita Barezzi (2016), Last complaint before my death (2017) and Weeds (2018). This year he receives the Francisco Nieva Short Theater Award for Vicious, ugly and dishonest things.

He also cultivates other genres such as novel, short story, script and poetry. Since February 2009 he has contributed with his own opinion section in Artez, a monthly magazine specialising in theatre.

According to Elisenda Romano (Insular Library of Gran Canaria, 2019) "the plays of the playwright Carlos Be use the words to stabbing social conventions and turn against the remorse of the spectator. Living the works of the author or reading them is absorbing dialogues and images that go beyond the stage and stay in the well of consciousness, some ideas asleep, others very awake, but always there, to come to the surface and look us in the eyes".
