= The Avignon Quintet =

Series of novels by Lawrence Durrell

- Author: Lawrence Durrell
- Language: English
- Series: The Avignon Quintet
- Genre: Novel
- Publisher: Faber & Faber (UK) & Viking (US)
- Publication date: 1992
- Publication place: Great Britain
- Media type: Print (hardback & paperback)
- Pages: 1376 p. (Faber edition)
- ISBN: 0-571-22555-1 (paperback edition)
- OCLC: 173163835
- Preceded by: The Revolt of Aphrodite
- Followed by: Caesar's Vast Ghost

The Avignon Quintet is a five-volume series of novels by British writer Lawrence Durrell, published between 1974 and 1985. The novels are metafictional. He uses developments in experimental fiction that followed his The Alexandria Quartet (1957–1960). The action of the novels is set before and during World War II, largely in France, Egypt, and Switzerland.

The novels feature multiple and contradictory narrators, often with each purporting to have written the others as characters in a novel. The thematic materials range from a form of Gnosticism blended with Catharism, obsession with mortality, Fascism, Nazism, and World War II to Holy Grail romances, metafiction, Quantum Mechanics, and sexual identity.

The five novels are:

- Monsieur (1974)
- Livia (1978)
- Constance (1982)
- Sebastian (1983)
- Quinx (1985)

Durrell often referred to the work as a "quincunx." He described them as "roped together like climbers on a rockface, but all independent... a series of books through which the same characters move for all the world as if to illustrate the notion of reincarnation."

The books were not published together as The Avignon Quintet until 1992, two years after Durrell's death in 1990. They were described as a quincunx in the first edition of Quinx. The notion of the quincunx challenges any linear approach to the novels, which is reflected in their stylistic features. The character of Livia may be modeled in part on Unity Mitford, one of the well-known Mitford sisters and a prominent supporter of fascism and friend of Adolf Hitler.

== Reception ==
The first novel, Monsieur, received the James Tait Black Memorial Prize of 1974. The middle novel, Constance, was nominated for the 1982 Booker Prize. While the Quintet did not receive the critical approval of his earlier Alexandria Quartet, Durrell was a bestselling and celebrated British author in this period. Records of the Swedish Academy that were opened in 2012 revealed that he had been on the shortlist for the Nobel Prize for Literature in 1962, the year that the American writer John Steinbeck was selected.
