= A Tale of Five Balloons =

- Author: Miriam Roth
- Illustrator: Ora Ayal
- Language: Hebrew
- Genre: Children's literature
- Published: 1974
- Publisher: Poalim Library
- Pages: 32

A Tale of Five Balloons (Hebrew: מעשה בחמישה בלונים, Ma'ase b'Khamisha Balonim) is an Israeli children's book by Miriam Roth published in 1974 and illustrated by Ora Ayal. The book has become a classic of Israeli children's literature.

== Plot ==
The book is about five children each of whom get a balloon from Ruti's mother — a blue balloon for Ruti, yellow for Ron, purple for Sigalit, green for Uri and red for Alon. During the book, all the children's balloons burst, with the exception of Alon's, which the wind blew out of the children's reach. The children look at the balloon and shout "Bye, bye, red balloon!".

Whenever one of the balloons bursts, the children are comforted and told "that's how all balloons end up". Each balloon had burst for the following different reasons:

- Uri's balloon burst due to contact with a rose bush while Uri was playing with it like a ball.
- Ron's balloon burst after his father over-inflated it since Ron wanted it to be "as big as the Sun".
- Sigalit's balloon burst after being scratched by Mitzi, Sigalit's cat.
- Ruti's balloon burst after she hugged it tightly.

== See also ==
- Hebrew literature
