= Tickets for a Prayer Wheel =

Poetry book

Tickets for a Prayer Wheel is a book of poetry by Annie Dillard first published in 1974. The poems are based on the author's quest for spiritual knowledge.
