= Monsieur (novel) =

1974 novel by Lawrence Durrell

- First UK edition
- Author: Lawrence Durrell
- Language: English
- Series: The Avignon Quintet
- Publisher: Faber & Faber (UK); Viking (US)
- Publication date: 1974
- Publication place: Great Britain
- Media type: Print (Hardback & Paperback)
- Pages: 296 p. (Faber edition)
- ISBN: 0-571-10660-9 (paperback edition)
- OCLC: 1109339
- Dewey Decimal: 823/.9/12
- LC Class: PZ3.D9377 Ml PR6007.U76
- Followed by: Livia

Monsieur, or The Prince of Darkness (1974), is the first volume in Lawrence Durrell's The Avignon Quintet. Published from 1974 to 1985, this sequence of five interrelated novels explore the lives of a group of Europeans before, during, and after World War II. Durrell uses many of the experimental techniques of metafiction that he had integrated into his Alexandria Quartet, published 1957 to 1960. He described the later quintet as a quincunx.

Monsieur is based on a metafictional narrative in five major sections, each with a competing narrator. The novel does not resolve which narrative is 'real' and which are 'fiction.' The novel was awarded the James Tait Black Memorial Prize in 1974.

== Background ==
The novel draws extensively on Gnosticism, and this system of belief recurs as a plot element throughout the Quintet. Durrell had an interest in Gnosticism from the early 1940s and had studied Gnostic texts. According to critics James Gifford and Stephen Osadetz, for Monsieur, Durrell drew from Serge Hutin's Les Gnostiques, as he had marked numerous passages in his copy, as well as contemporary newspaper reports he held of a Slovenian suicide cult. These materials are held at the Bibliotheque Lawrence Durrell, Université Paris X, Nanterre.

Gifford and Osadetz say that "most critics" incorrectly suggested that the author had based his discussion on Jacques Lacarrière's The Gnostics because he had known the essayist and critic since 1971 and wrote the "Foreword" to the 1974 English translation of his book. In Monsieur, "Durrell's Gnostics enact their refusal of the cursed world, flawed in every way, through suicide via the active acceptance of death." But Lacarrière had written that "suicide is the absolute antithesis of the Gnostic attitude." The Gnostic suicide plot is an element that Durrell uses in his four late novels of the Avignon Quintet.

Durrell's 1974 novel was published prior to the publication in English of the Nag Hammadi Library (1978). This was greeted with great interest by the many interested in these unique materials. The annotated edition has translations of an extensive stash of ancient documents from the period of early Christianity when Gnosticism was a powerful movement. The documents were discovered in the 1940s and had been tightly controlled by a group of scholars. The English edition of the Nag Hammadi papers refers to Durrell in its introduction, but largely in relation to his earlier The Alexandria Quartet (1957 to 1960).

== Plot summary ==
Five characters in Monsieur (including Durrell, referred to as "D," of "Devil in the Details") claim to be the author of the book.

In the first section, "Outremer" (outre-mer, meaning overseas in French, and used to officially refer to former colonies that are now departments and territories of the metropole), protagonist Bruce Drexel is introduced, who is the chief narrator of the novel. (He shares certain characteristics with Durrell, such as working as a diplomat and press attaché.) He is returning to Provence after learning of the suicide of his lover, Piers de Nogaret; Drexel is married to Piers' sister Sylvie. Drexel's wife has been institutionalized for mental illness for some time. He revisits Avignon with his friend Toby, while attending to the necessary funeral arrangements. He reminisces about his life with Piers and Sylvie. He recalls rich winter scenes when the three were first in love, as well as a novel written about them by Robin Sutcliffe. Another character, Aubrey Blanford, is noted briefly as having recently published a novel and gained fame from it.

The second chapter, "Macabru," recounts Bruce, Piers, and Sylvie's journey into Egypt years earlier. There they meet Akkad, who initiates them into a Gnostic cult. Akkad takes them to Macabru, an oasis in the desert, to introduce them to the cult's rituals. They take an extended journey together on the Nile River in this section. (Durrell's second novel of the Quintet, Livia, has characters make a river journey on the Rhone.)

"Sutcliffe, or the Venetian Documents" presents a new narrator, Robin Sutcliffe, identified as a character in Blanford's novel. This appears to render the previous materials as fictional, unless this is another fiction. Sutcliffe has various misadventures in Venice and recalls his failed marriage to Pia, Bruce's sister.

"Life with Toby" returns to Bruce and Toby in Avignon, discussing a theory about the Knights Templar. This returns to the Gnostic theme. This section is interrupted by another text in "The Green Notebook," which returns to Sutcliffe. (Durrell initially wrote Monsieur in a green notebook. "The Green Notebook" in this novel consists largely of his unrevised notes from work that preceded this novel.) This section becomes highly fragmentary.

"Dinner at Quartilla's" is the last section of the novel. It reintroduces author Aubrey Blanford, who claims to have written the entire novel, in which Sutcliffe is a character. He dines with his friend, the old Duchess Tu. But she is known to have been long dead.

The novel ends with an Envoi; it provides a list of who begat whom throughout the novel, but without a final resolution.

== Reception ==
Critics generally praised the novel. In this period, Durrell was highly respected for his experimental works, was a bestselling author, and celebrated in Great Britain. Monsieur won the 1974 James Tait Black Memorial Prize. Its complex structure and treatment of Gnosticism has stimulated much scholarly study.

But the New York Times reviewer was critical, saying, "The writing seems hastily improvised ... The writing often gives this odd impression of being translated badly. We hear of a 'female stag' and 'a magnificent marble fountain of filigreed workmanship.'" He closed the article with "The 'Monsieur' of the title is the devil: those interested in that subject should read Robertson Davies's fine novel 'Fifth Business.' As for 'Monsieur,' it is regrettable that Durrell's advisers should have allowed him to publish it in its present formlessness."
