= Derek Lambert =

English journalist and author

- Born: 10 October 1929; London, England
- Died: 10 April 2001 (aged 71); Denia, Spain
- Occupation: Novelist
- Writing career
- Genre: Fiction

Derek (William) Lambert (10 October 1929 – 10 April 2001) was a British journalist and an author of thrillers. both in his own name and also writing as Richard Falkirk.

== Life ==
Lambert was educated at Epsom College. As a foreign correspondent for the Daily Express, he spent time in many exotic locales that he later used as settings in his novels, the first of which, Angels in the Snow, was published in 1969. Between 1972 and 1977 he wrote a series of six novels beginning with Blackstone about a member of the Bow Street Runners in the 1820s.

His 1975 novel Touch the Lion's Paw was adapted to film as Rough Cut.

== Bibliography ==
=== Novels (as Derek Lambert) ===
- Angels in the Snow (1969)
- The Kites of War (1969)
- For Infamous Conduct (1970)
- Grand Slam (1971)
- The Red House (1972)
- The Yermakov Transfer (1974)
- Touch the Lion's Paw (1975)
- The Great Land (1978)
- The Saint Peter's Plot (1978)
- The Memory Man (1979)
- I, Said the Spy (1980)
- Trance (1981)
- The Red Dove (1982)
- The Judas Code (1983)
- The Golden Express (1984)
- The Man Who Was Saturday (1985)
- Vendetta (1986)
- Chase (1987)
- Triad (1987)
- The Night and the City (1990)
- The Gate of the Sun (1990)
- The Banya (1991)
- Horrorscope (1993)
- Diamond Express (1994)
- The Killing House (1997)

=== Novels (as Richard Falkirk) ===
- The Chill Factor (1971)
- The Twisted Wire (1972)

=== Blackstone novels (as Richard Falkirk) ===
A "Historical whodunnit" series, focusing on a Bow Street Runner Edmund Blackstone in 1820s London.

- Blackstone (1972)
- Blackstone's Fancy (1973)
- Beau Blackstone (1973)
- Blackstone and the Scourge of Europe (1974)
- Blackstone Underground (1976)
- Blackstone on Broadway (1977)

=== Non-fiction (as Derek Lambert) ===
- The Sheltered Days [1965]
- Don't Quote Me But [1979]
- And I Quote [1980]
- Unquote [1981]
- Just Like the Blitz [1987]
- Spanish Lessons [2000]
