= Lord of Dark Places =

1970 novel by Hal Bennett

- First edition (US)
- Author: Hal Bennett
- Language: English
- Published: 1970
- Publisher: W. W. Norton (US); Calder and Boyars (UK)
- Publication place: United States
- ISBN: 9781885983121

Lord of Dark Places is a novel by Hal Bennett. It deals with the events surrounding a black man from the American South who moves to the north. It has been described as "a satirical and all but scatological attack on the phallic myth".
