= The Yermakov Transfer =

1974 novel

- First edition
- Author: Derek Lambert
- Language: English
- Genre: Thriller
- Publisher: Arlington Books
- Publication date: 1974
- Publication place: United Kingdom
- Media type: Print

The Yermakov Transfer is a 1974 thriller novel by the British writer Derek Lambert. The life of the Soviet President is threatened by a plan to kidnap him on the Trans-Siberian Express.

== Bibliography ==
- Burton, Alan. Historical Dictionary of British Spy Fiction. Rowman & Littlefield, 2016.
