= Robert D. Richardson =

American historian (1934–2020)

- Born: Robert Dale Richardson III; June 14, 1934; Milwaukee, Wisconsin, U.S.
- Died: June 16, 2020 (aged 86); Hyannis, Massachusetts, U.S.
- Education: Phillips Exeter Academy; Harvard University (PhD)
- Occupations: Historian; biographer
- Spouse(s): Elizabeth Hall Annie Dillard (m. 1988)
- Children: 2
- Writing career
- Notable awards: Francis Parkman Prize (1996); Bancroft Prize (2007)

Robert Dale Richardson III (June 14, 1934 – June 16, 2020) was an American historian and biographer.

== Early life ==
Richardson was born in Milwaukee and brought up in Medford, Massachusetts, and Concord, Massachusetts. He graduated from Exeter, in 1952, and from Harvard University, with a PhD.

== Career ==
He taught at the University of Denver, Harvard University, Yale University, the University of Colorado, Queens College, City University of New York, Sichuan University, Wesleyan University, and the University of North Carolina at Chapel Hill.

Richardson was known for his biographies of Henry Thoreau, Ralph Waldo Emerson, and William James. Emerson: The Mind on Fire won the Francis Parkman Prize in 1996, and William James: In the Maelstrom of American Modernism won the Bancroft Prize in 2007.

In the first half of his career, he published as Robert D. Richardson Jr. Later, he dropped the "Jr."

== Personal life and death ==
Richardson was first married to Elizabeth Hall; they had two daughters.

He married Annie Dillard in 1988, after she wrote him a fan letter about Henry Thoreau: A Life of the Mind.

He was program chair for New Voices at the Key West Literary Seminar.

Richardson died in Hyannis, Massachusetts, on June 16, 2020, two days after his 86th birthday, from a subdural hematoma suffered in a fall.

== Awards ==
- 2007 Bancroft Prize
- 1990 Guggenheim Fellowship
- 1996 Francis Parkman Prize
- Melcher Book Award

== Works ==
External videos
- Booknotes interview with Richardson on Emerson: The Mind on Fire, August 13, 1995, C-SPAN
- Presentation by Richardson on Emerson, March 18, 1996, C-SPAN
- Presentation by Richardson on William James, November 30, 2006, C-SPAN

This section lists only Richardson's book-length publications. For his dozens of essays, forwards, and reviews, see the author's official website.

Biographical books

- Henry Thoreau: A Life of the Mind. University of California Press. 1986.
- Emerson: The Mind on Fire. University of California Press. 1996.
- William James: In the Maelstrom of American Modernism. Houghton Mifflin Harcourt. 2006.
- First We Read, Then We Write: Emerson on the Creative Process. University of Iowa Press. 2009.
- Splendor of Heart: Walter Jackson Bate and the Teaching of Literature. David R. Godine, Publisher. 2013.
- Nearer the Heart's Desire: Poets of the Rubaiyat: A Dual Biography of Omar Khayyam and Edward FitzGerald. Bloomsbury. 2016.
- Three Roads Back: How Emerson, Thoreau, and William James Responded to the Greatest Losses of Their Lives. Princeton University Press. 2023.

Scholarly monographs

- Literature and Film. Indiana University Press. 1969.
- Myth and Literature in the American Renaissance. Indiana University Press. 1978.

Edited and introduced collections

- With Burton Feldman. The rise of modern mythology, 1680-1860. Indiana University Press. 2000.
- Emerson, Ralph Waldo. Selected Essays, Lectures, and Poems. Bantam. 1990.
- With Allen Mandelbaum. Three Centuries of American Poetry. Bantam. 1999. (Also published as A Treasury of American Poetry.)
- James, William. The Heart of William James. Harvard University Press. 2010.
- Thoreau, Henry David. October, or Autumnal Tints. Norton. 2012.
- Khayyam, Omar. The Rubaiyat of Omar Khayyam. Bloomsbury. 2016.
