= Hal Bennett =

American novelist (1936–2004)

- Bennett author photo from the jacket of Wait Until The Evening
- Born: George Harold Bennett; April 21, 1930; Buckingham, Virginia
- Died: September 11, 2004 (aged 74); Newark, New Jersey
- Other names: Harriet Janeway; John D. Revere
- Occupation: Writer

George Harold "Hal" Bennett (April 21, 1930 – September 11, 2004) was an author known for a variety of books. His 1970 novel Lord of Dark Places was described as "a satirical and all but scatological attack on the phallic myth", and was reprinted in 1997. He was Playboy's most promising writer of the year. He also wrote under the pen names Harriet Janeway and John D. Revere (the Assassin series). His books are sometimes compared to Mark Twain's style of satire, but contain a much stronger sexual tone.

== Awards and honors ==
- 1973: William Faulkner Prize

== Selected bibliography ==
- The Mexico City Poems and House on Hay (Chicago: Obsidian Press, 1961)
- A Wilderness of Vines (Garden City: Doubleday, 1966)
- The Black Wine (Garden City: Doubleday, 1968)
- Lord of Dark Places (New York: Norton, 1970) (ISBN 1885983123) (ISBN 9781885983121)
- Wait Until the Evening (Garden City: Doubleday, 1974) (ISBN 0385010222) (ISBN 9780385010221)
- Seventh Heaven (Garden City: Doubleday, 1976) (ISBN 0385066597) (ISBN 9780385066594)
- Insanity Runs In Our Family: Short Stories (Garden City: Doubleday, 1977)(ISBN 0385066643) (ISBN 9780385066648)

=== Selected uncollected short stories ===
- "Wings of the Dove," Black American Literature Forum, Vol. 23, No. 2 (Summer 1989), pp. 223–230
- "Miss Askew on Ice," Callaloo, Vol. 10, No. 1 (Winter 1987), pp. 1–12
- "Chewing Gum," Black American Literature Forum, Vol. 21, No. 4 (Winter 1987), pp. 379–392

=== as Harriet Janeway ===
- This Passionate Land (1979)

=== as John D. Revere ===
- Justin Perry : The Assassin
- The Assassin 2 : Vatican Kill
- The Assassin 3 : Born To Kill
- The Assassin 4: Death's Running Mate
- The Assassin 5: Stud Service

=== Autobiography ===
- Bennett, Hal (1991). "The Visible Man". In Nakamura, Joyce (ed.). Contemporary Authors Autobiography Series. Vol. 13. Gale Research. pp. 73–88. ISBN 9780810345126.
