= Blackstone and the Scourge of Europe =

1974 novel

- First edition
- Author: Derek Lambert
- Language: English
- Series: Edmund Blackstone
- Genre: Historical thriller
- Publisher: Eyre Methuen (UK); Stein and Day (US)
- Publication date: 1974
- Publication place: United Kingdom
- Media type: Print
- Preceded by: Beau Blackstone
- Followed by: Blackstone Underground

Blackstone and the Scourge of Europe is a 1974 historical thriller novel by the British writer Derek Lambert, published under the pen name Richard Falkirk. It is the fourth in a series of six novels featuring Edmund Blackstone, a member of the Bow Street Runners in the pre-Victorian era. It is 1820 and George IV orders Blackstone to the island of St Helena, where the imprisoned former French Emperor Napoleon may be plotting to escape.

== Bibliography ==
- Lynda G. Adamson. World Historical Fiction. Greenwood Publishing Group, 1999.
