= Annie Dillard =

American author (1945–2026)

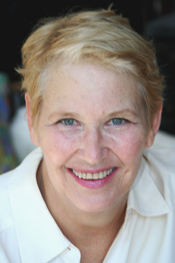
- Annie Dillard in 2011
- Born: Meta Ann Doak; April 30, 1945; Pittsburgh, Pennsylvania, U.S.
- Died: September 15, 2026 (aged 81); Wellfleet, Massachusetts, U.S.
- Occupation: Writer
- Spouses: Richard Dillard (m. 1965; div. 1975) Gary Clevidence (m. 1976; div. 1988) Robert D. Richardson (m. 1988; died 2020)
- Children: 1
- Writing career
- Period: 1974–2026
- Genres: Nonfiction; fiction; poetry
- Notable works: Pilgrim at Tinker Creek; The Maytrees
- Notable awards: Pulitzer Prize for General Nonfiction (1975)
- Website: www.anniedillard.com

Annie Dillard (née Doak; April 30, 1945 – September 15, 2026) was an American author, best known for her narrative prose in both fiction and nonfiction. She published works of poetry, essays, prose, and literary criticism, as well as two novels and one memoir. Her 1974 book Pilgrim at Tinker Creek won the 1975 Pulitzer Prize for General Nonfiction. From 1980, Dillard taught for 21 years in the English department of Wesleyan University, in Middletown, Connecticut.

== Early life ==
Dillard was born in Pittsburgh April 30, 1945, to Frank and Pam Doak. She was the eldest of three daughters. Dillard's elementary school was located in the Shadyside neighborhood of Pittsburgh.

Early childhood details can be drawn from Dillard's autobiography, An American Childhood (1987), about growing up in the 1950s Point Breeze neighborhood of Pittsburgh in "a house full of comedians". The book focuses on "waking up" from a self-absorbed childhood and becoming immersed in the present moment of the larger world. She described her mother as an energetic non-conformist. Her father taught her many useful subjects such as plumbing, economics, and the intricacies of the novel On the Road, though by the end of her adolescence she began to realize neither of her parents were infallible.

In her autobiography, Dillard described reading a wide variety of subjects including geology, natural history, entomology, epidemiology, and poetry, among others. Among the influential books from her youth were The Natural Way to Draw and Field Book of Ponds and Streams because they allowed her a way to interact with the present moment and a way of escape, respectively. Her days were filled with exploring, piano and dance classes, rock collecting, bug collecting, drawing, and reading books from the public library including natural history and military history (World War II).

As a child, Dillard attended the Shadyside Presbyterian Church in Pittsburgh, though her parents did not attend. She spent four summers at the First Presbyterian Church (FPC) Camp in Ligonier, Pennsylvania. As an adolescent, she stopped attending church, citing "hypocrisy". When she told her minister of her decision, she was given four volumes of C. S. Lewis's broadcast talks, from which she appreciated that author's philosophy on suffering, but elsewhere found the topic inadequately addressed.

She attended Pittsburgh Public Schools until fifth grade, and then The Ellis School until college.

== Education ==
Dillard attended Hollins College in Roanoke, Virginia, where she studied English, theology, and creative writing. Dillard stated, "In college I learned how to learn from other people. As far as I was concerned, writing in college didn't consist of what little Annie had to say, but what Wallace Stevens had to say. I didn't come to college to think my own thoughts, I came to learn what had been thought." She received a Bachelor of Arts degree in 1967 and a Master of Arts degree in 1968. Her Master's thesis on Henry David Thoreau (OCLC 20943735) showed how Walden Pond functioned as "the central image and focal point for Thoreau's narrative movement between heaven and earth".

She spent the first few years after graduation oil painting, writing, and keeping a journal. Several of her poems and short stories were published, and during this time she also worked for Lyndon B. Johnson's War on Poverty anti-poverty program.

From 1975 to 1978, Dillard was a scholar-in-residence at Western Washington University in Bellingham, Washington.

Dillard later received honorary doctorate degrees from Boston College, Connecticut College, and the University of Hartford.

== Career ==
=== Writing ===
Dillard's works have been compared to those by Henry David Thoreau, Virginia Woolf, Gerard Manley Hopkins, Emily Dickinson, William Blake, and John Donne, and she cited Henry James, Thomas Hardy, Graham Greene, George Eliot, and Ernest Hemingway among her favorite authors.

==== Tickets for a Prayer Wheel (1974) ====
In her first book of poems, Tickets for a Prayer Wheel (1974), Dillard began to articulate themes that she would later explore in other works of prose. The collection includes poems that use religious symbolism alongside others organized around quotations. Its title poem consists of prayers and anticipates themes and imagery that Dillard later explored in Holy the Firm.

==== Pilgrim at Tinker Creek (1974) ====
Dillard's journals served as a source for Pilgrim at Tinker Creek, a nonfiction narrative about the natural world near her home in Roanoke, Virginia. Although the book contains named chapters, it is not (as some critics assumed) a collection of essays. Early chapters were published in The Atlantic, Harper's, and Sports Illustrated. Dillard said on her website, "The book attempted to describe the creator, if any, by studying creation, leading one writer to call me (wonderfully) 'one of the foremost horror writers of the 20th Century'." In The New York Times, Eudora Welty said the work contained some "admirable writing" and that it revealed "a sense of wonder so fearless and unbridled [and] an intensity of experience that she seems to live in order to declare", but "I honestly do not know what [Dillard] is talking about at ... times."

The book won the 1975 Pulitzer Prize for General Nonfiction. Dillard was 28, making her the youngest woman to have won the award.

==== Holy the Firm (1977) ====
One day, Dillard decided to begin a project in which she would write about whatever happened on Lummi Island within a three-day time period. When a plane crashed on the second day, Dillard began to contemplate, as she said on her website, "the problem of pain: Why would an omnipotent, omniscient and merciful God allow natural evil to happen?"

Although Holy the Firm was only 66 pages long, it took her 14 months, writing full-time, to complete the manuscript. In The New York Times Book Review novelist Frederick Buechner called it "a rare and precious book". Some critics wondered whether Dillard was under the influence of hallucinogenic drugs while writing the book. Dillard replied that she was not.

==== Teaching a Stone to Talk (1982) ====
Teaching a Stone to Talk is a book of 14 short nonfiction narrative and travel essays. The essay "Life on the Rocks: The Galapagos" won the New York Women's Press Club award, and "Total Eclipse" was chosen for Best American Essays of the Century (2000) (LCCN 2001-580407 audio version). Dillard herself said, "'The Weasel' is lots of fun; the much-botched church service is hilarious." Following the first hardcover edition of the book, the order of essays was changed. Initially "Living Like Weasels" was first, followed by "An Expedition to the Pole". "Total Eclipse" was found between "On a Hill Far Away" and "Lenses".

The essays in Teaching a Stone to Talk:

- "Total Eclipse"
- "An Expedition to the Pole"
- "In the Jungle"
- "Living Like Weasels"
- "The Deer at Providencia"
- "Teaching a Stone to Talk"
- "On a Hill Far Away"
- "Lenses"
- "Life on the Rocks: The Galapagos"
- "A Field of Silence"
- "God in the Doorway"
- "Mirages"
- "Sojourner"
- "Aces and Eights"

==== Living by Fiction (1982) ====
In Living by Fiction, Dillard produced her "theory about why flattening of character and narrative cannot happen in literature as it did when the visual arts rejected deep space for the picture plane", as she said on her website, adding that in the process of writing this book, she talked herself into writing an old-fashioned novel, resulting in The Living.

==== Encounters with Chinese Writers (1984) ====
Encounters with Chinese Writers is a work of journalism. One part takes place in China, where Dillard was a member of a delegation of six American writers and publishers, following the fall of the Gang of Four. In the second half, Dillard hosted a group of Chinese writers, whom she took to Disneyland along with Allen Ginsberg. On her website Dillard called the description of the trip "hilarious".

==== The Writing Life (1989) ====
The Writing Life is a collection of short essays in which Dillard "discusses with clear eye and wry wit how, where and why she writes". The Boston Globe called it "a kind of spiritual Strunk & White, a small and brilliant guidebook to the landscape of a writer's task". The Chicago Tribune wrote that, "For nonwriters, it is a glimpse into the trials and satisfactions of a life spent with words. For writers, it is a warm, rambling conversation with a stimulating and extraordinarily talented colleague." The Detroit News called it "a spare volume...that has the power and force of a detonating bomb". According to a biography of Dillard written by her husband Robert D. Richardson, Dillard "repudiates [The Writing Life] except for the last chapter, the true story of stunt pilot Dave Rahm".

==== The Living (1992) ====
Dillard's first novel, The Living, centers on the first European settlers of the Pacific Northwest coast. While writing the book, she never allowed herself to read works that postdated the year she was writing about, nor did she use anachronistic words.

==== Mornings Like This (1995) ====
Mornings Like This is a book dedicated to found poetry. Dillard took and arranged phrases from various old books, creating poems that are often ironic in tone. The poems are not related to the original books' themes. "A good trick should look hard and be easy", said Dillard on her website. "These poems were a bad trick. They look easy and are really hard."

==== For the Time Being (1999) ====
For the Time Being is a work of narrative nonfiction. According to Dillard's website, the topics of its chapters include "birth, sand, China, clouds, numbers, Israel, encounters, thinker, evil, and now", adding, "I quit the Catholic Church and Christianity; I stay near Christianity and Hasidism."

==== The Maytrees (2007) ====
The Maytrees is Dillard's second novel. The story begins after World War II and tells of a lifelong love between a husband and wife who live in Provincetown, Cape Cod. It was a finalist for the PEN/Faulkner Award for Fiction in 2008.

==== The Abundance (2017) ====
The Abundance, a collection of essays curated by the author, was published in 2017.

=== Teaching ===
In 1975, Dillard moved to the Pacific Northwest and taught for four years at Fairhaven College and Western Washington University. In 1980, she began teaching in the English department of Wesleyan University in Middletown, Connecticut, where she remained until she retired as Professor Emerita in 2002.

== Personal life ==
=== Relationships ===
In 1965, at age 20, Dillard married her creative writing professor, Richard Dillard. In 1975, they divorced amicably and she moved from Roanoke to Lummi Island near Bellingham, Washington.

In 1976, she married Gary Clevidence, an anthropology professor at Fairhaven College, and they have a child, Cody Rose, born in 1984. Dillard and Clevidence remained married until 1988.

In 1988, Dillard married historical biographer Robert D. Richardson, whom she met after sending him a fan letter about his book Henry Thoreau: A Life of the Mind. They were married until Richardson's death in 2020.

=== Religion ===
After college Dillard said she became "spiritually promiscuous". Her first prose book, Pilgrim at Tinker Creek, makes references not only to Christ and the Bible, but also to Islam, Judaism, Buddhism, and Inuit spirituality. Around 1988 Dillard converted for a while to Roman Catholicism, described in detail in a New York Times overview of her work in 1992.

In 1994, she won the Campion Award, given to a Catholic writer every year by the editors of America. In her 1999 book, For the Time Being, she describes her abandonment of Christianity, describing the supposed absurdity of some Christian doctrines, while stating she still stays near Christianity, and continuing to valorize Catholic writer Teilhard de Chardin. Her personal website lists her religion as "none".

=== Philanthropy ===
Sales of Dillard's paintings benefit Partners in Health, a Boston-based nonprofit international health organization.

=== Death ===
Dillard died of natural causes at her home in South Wellfleet, Massachusetts, on September 15, 2026, at the age of 81.

== Awards and honors ==
Dillard's books have been translated into at least 10 languages. Her 1975 Pulitzer-winning book, Pilgrim at Tinker Creek, made Random House's survey of the century's 100 best nonfiction books. The Los Angeles Times' survey of the century's 100 best Western novels includes The Living. The century's 100 best spiritual books (ed. Philip Zaleski) also includes Pilgrim at Tinker Creek. The 100 best essays (ed. Joyce Carol Oates) includes "Total Eclipse," from Teaching a Stone to Talk. The translators of two of Dillard's books—Sabine Porte and Pierre Gault—have won Maurice-Edgar Coindreau Prizes in France for their translations. Gault's translation of Pilgrim at Tinker Creek as Pélerinage à Tinker Creek won in 1990 and Porte's translation of For the Time Being as Au Présent won in 2002.

In 1997, Dillard was inducted into the Connecticut Women's Hall of Fame for Writing and Journalism.

In 2000, Dillard's For the Time Being received the PEN/Diamonstein-Spielvogel Award for the Art of the Essay.

The New York Times named Maytrees among the top ten books published in 2007.

On September 10, 2015, Dillard was awarded a National Humanities Medal.

== Major works ==
- 1974 Tickets for a Prayer Wheel ISBN 0-8195-6536-9
- 1974 Pilgrim at Tinker Creek ISBN 0-06-095302-0
- 1977 Holy The Firm ISBN 0-06-091543-9
- 1982 Living By Fiction ISBN 0-06-091544-7
- 1982 Teaching a Stone To Talk ISBN 0-06-091541-2
- 1984 Encounters with Chinese Writers ISBN 0-8195-6156-8
- 1987 An American Childhood ISBN 0-06-091518-8
- 1989 The Writing Life ISBN 0-06-091988-4
- 1992 The Living ISBN 0-06-092411-X
- 1995 Mornings Like This: Found Poems ISBN 0-06-092725-9
- 1999 For the Time Being ISBN 0-375-40380-9
- 2007 The Maytrees ISBN 0-06-123953-4
- 2016 The Abundance: Narrative Essays Old & New ISBN 0-06-243297-4

== Adaptations in other media ==
To celebrate its city's centennial in 1984, the Boston Symphony commissioned Sir Michael Tippett to compose a choral work, The Mask of Time. He based part of its text on Pilgrim at Tinker Creek.

In 2005, artist Jenny Holzer used An American Childhood, along with three other books, in her light-based "scrolling" artwork For Pittsburgh, installed at the David L. Lawrence Convention Center in Pittsburgh.
