= Miriam Roth =

Israeli (Hebrew) children's book author and educator (1910–2005)

- מרים רות
- Born: February 16, 1910; Érsekújvár, Austria-Hungary (today: Nové Zámky, Slovakia)
- Died: November 13, 2005 (aged 95); Kibbutz Sha'ar HaGolan, Israel
- Education: Brno University; Seminar Hakibbutzim Teachers College; Hebrew University in Jerusalem; Teachers College, Columbia University (masters degree); City College of New York (MA in pedagogy)
- Occupations: scholar of pre-school education, writer of children's books, kindergarten teacher, educator
- Notable work: "A Tale of Five Balloons" (1974), "Boots" (1975), "Yael's House" (1977), "Hot Corn" (1978), "Grandma’s Coat" (1981), "Miep Won’t Go to Sleep" (1993), "Podi the Hedgehog" (1994), "Confused Yuval" (2000)
- Relatives: Great-granddaughter is Amit Ivry, an Israeli Olympic swimmer, Maccabiah Games champion, and national record holder
- Awards: Ze'ev Prize for children's and young adult literature for Lifetime Achievement (1990); UNICEF Smile Award (1998); Bialik Prize (2002)

Miriam Roth (Hebrew: מרים רות; February 16, 1910 – November 13, 2005) was a preeminent pioneer of Israeli preschool education, author and scholar of children's literature, with a long career as a kindergarten teacher and educator. Many of the children's books she wrote became Israeli best-selling classics.

== Biography ==
Miriam Roth was born in 1910 to Helén (Hella, Linka) and Jenő (Yaakov) Roth. She was born in the Austro-Hungarian town of Érsekújvár, now Nové Zámky, where the main language at the time was Hungarian, and which later became part of Czechoslovakia and then Slovakia. Her father, who had fought in World War I, was the principal of the town's Jewish elementary school. She studied psychology and earned a bachelor's degree in pedagogy and natural sciences at Masaryk University.

Roth was a leading member of the Socialist-Zionist Hashomer Hatzair youth movement from an early age. In 1931 she immigrated to Palestine without her family. There, she studied at the Seminar HaKibbutzim Teachers College in Tel Aviv, and at the Hebrew University in Jerusalem. In 1937, Roth was one of the founders of Kibbutz Sha'ar HaGolan, in what was then Mandatory Palestine, where she worked as a kindergarten teacher and lived for many years.

During the Holocaust, her parents, two sisters, and two young nieces who were still in Europe were sent to Auschwitz and murdered. During the 1947–1949 Palestine war, the Syrian army captured her kibbutz and, as she recalled, "the Arabs burned Sha'ar Hagolan and my personal archive was burned and I lost all the letters and family photographs that I'd received."

In 1960, Roth went to New York to study at the Bank Street College of Education, and later, she earned a master's degree in education from Teachers College, Columbia University, in New York, and an MA in pedagogy from City College of New York.

Roth was married to Pesach Ivry, who died in 1978. The couple had three sons.

In 2005, she was reunited with a long-lost relative. Her cousin Alfréd (Ali) Aladár Neuwald, who had survived the Holocaust, had lost touch with Roth, but his daughter, Ruth Neuwald Falcon, a documentary filmmaker in Seattle, searched the computer database of Jerusalem's Yad Vashem and learned that her mother's family had been murdered at Auschwitz, but also discovered information that led her to find and re-connect with Roth.

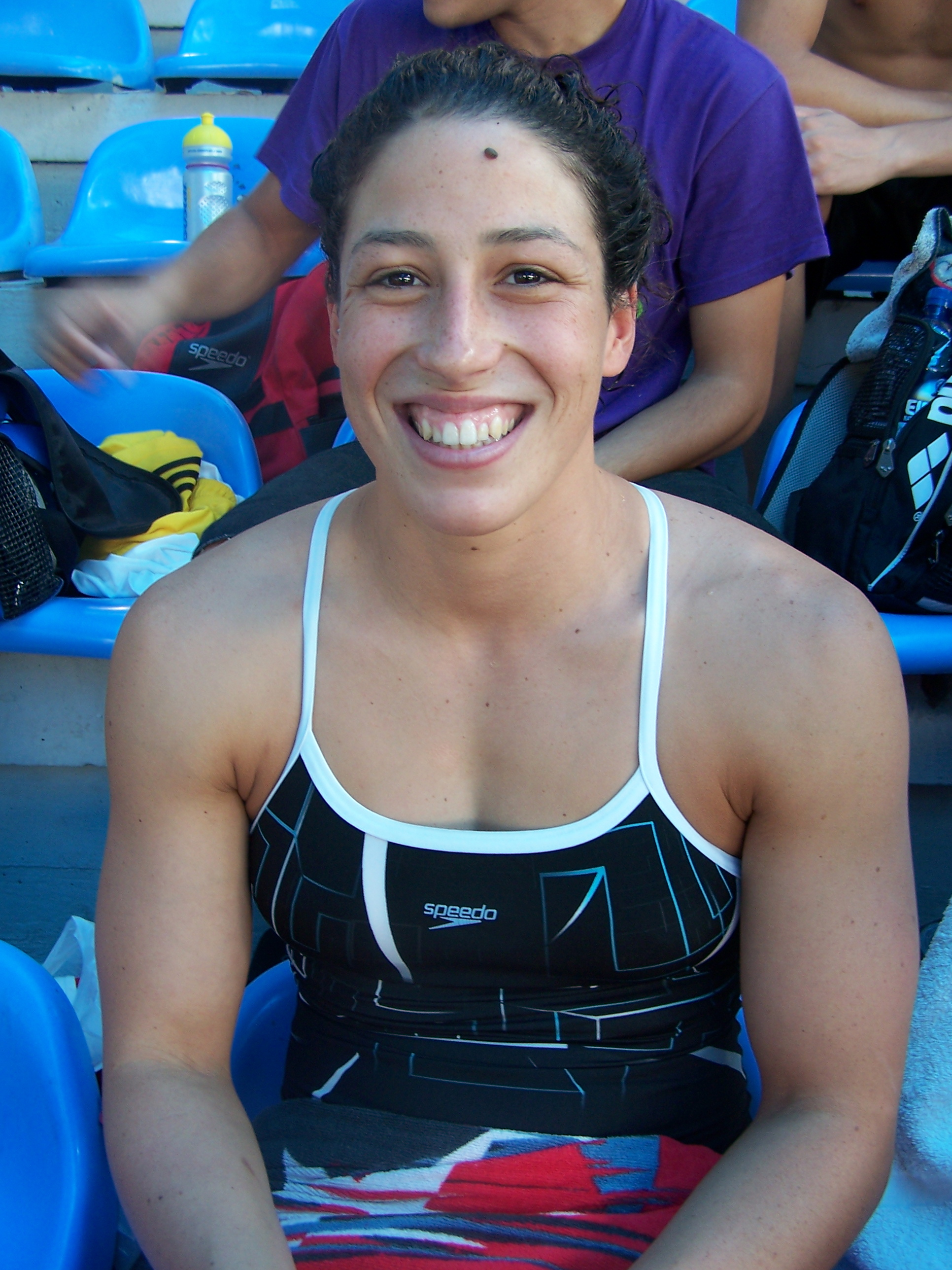
Roth's great-granddaughter Amit Ivry, Israeli Olympic swimmer

Her great-granddaughter, Amit Ivry, is an Israeli Olympic swimmer, Maccabiah Games champion, and national record holder.

Roth died of pneumonia on November 13, 2005, at Kibbutz Sha'ar Hagolan, at the age of 95.

== Pedagogic career ==
Roth taught preschool education and children's literature to kindergarten teachers at the Oranim Academic College until the age of 70, and trained teachers and taught children's literature at Seminar Hakibbutzim (the Kibbutzim College of Education). She also wrote textbooks on kindergarten education, and lectured and published articles on education and on children's literature. Roth believed that educators should be responsible for the production and promotion of children's books. Over the years, she composed and published reading lists for young children.

She wrote "The Preschool Method" (1955), "The Child and You" (1958), and "Literature for the Very Young" (1969). In 1956, Roth published "The Theory of the Kindergarten". She was a founder of Kibbutz Artzi's "Theory of the Nursery", and in 1958 advised parents to follow the advice of professional educators, saying:

Many parents do not know how to handle their children. They have not learned the laws governing a child's development and are not familiar with his needs. It seems that ‘parenting’, too, is a profession that must be taught.

== Literary career ==
Roth published 23 books for children in Hebrew, many of which became best-sellers, and 6 books on education and children's literature. She started writing relatively late in life, and authored popular Israeli children's literature classics. They include her first children's book "A Tale of Five Balloons" (1974; published when she was 61 years old), "Boots" (1975), "Yael's House" (1977), "Hot Corn" (1978), "Grandma’s Coat" (1981), "Miep Won’t Go to Sleep" (1993), "Podi the Hedgehog" (1994), and her 22nd book "Confused Yuval" (2000).

"A Tale of Five Balloons" was inspired by her experience comforting her own children, after the balloons she would bring them would eventually burst. Roth was revolutionary, in that she created a new literary genre focused on children's emotions and experiences, instead of on collective themes.

Roth's philosophy was that:

"Excellent literature educates. Not by morals patched and an ‘educational’ finger wagged. What makes it ‘educational’ is its deep human content, offered in an excellent artistic form. Children learn a lesson from the fate of others, expand their view of the world, improve their language, enrich their ability for expression, and upgrade their ability of moral judgement."

== Recognition and awards ==
In the Israeli city of Holon, a sculpture of an enormous corncob next to a weathervane inspired by Roth's "Corn on the Cob" was installed in the Tel Giborim neighborhood.

Roth was awarded the Ze`ev Prize for Lifetime Achievement in 1990, the UNICEF Smile Award (for "A Tale of Five Balloons") in 1998, and the Bialik Prize in 2002.
