= Penguin Modern Poets =

Penguin Modern Poets was a series of 27 poetry books published by Penguin Books in the 1960s and 1970s, each containing work by three contemporary poets (mostly but not exclusively British and American). The series was begun in 1962 and published an average of two volumes per year throughout the 1960s. Each volume was stated to be "an attempt to introduce contemporary poetry to the general reader". The series added up to a substantial survey of English-language poetry of the time.

Penguin Modern Poets was the first venture on the part of Penguin Books to offer contemporary poetry. Although at the time, most poetry was published in expensive hardbound editions, Penguin Modern Poets offered the public samplers of modern verse in inexpensive paperbacks. No. 27, the last of the original series, appeared in 1979.

The outstanding success of the series was No. 10, which, unlike the others, had its own title (The Mersey Sound) and which, with sales of over 500,000, has become one of the best-selling poetry anthologies ever.

A second Penguin Modern Poets series, of at least thirteen volumes on the same pattern, was launched in the 1990s. A third Penguin Modern Poets series was launched in 2016.

== Penguin Modern Poets (first series) ==
1. Lawrence Durrell, Elizabeth Jennings, R. S. Thomas — 1962
2. Kingsley Amis, Dom Moraes, Peter Porter — 1962
3. George Barker, Martin Bell, Charles Causley — 1962
4. David Holbrook, Christopher Middleton, David Wevill — 1963
5. Gregory Corso, Lawrence Ferlinghetti, Allen Ginsberg — 1963
6. George MacBeth, Edward Lucie-Smith, Jack Clemo
7. Richard Murphy, Jon Silkin, Nathaniel Tarn
8. Edwin Brock, Geoffrey Hill, Stevie Smith
9. Denise Levertov, Kenneth Rexroth, William Carlos Williams
10. Adrian Henri, Roger McGough, Brian Patten (entitled: The Mersey Sound)
11. D. M. Black, Peter Redgrove, D. M. Thomas
12. Alan Jackson, Jeff Nuttall, William Wantling
13. Charles Bukowski, Philip Lamantia, Harold Norse
14. Alan Brownjohn, Michael Hamburger, Charles Tomlinson
15. Alan Bold, Edward Brathwaite, Edwin Morgan
16. Jack Beeching, Harry Guest, Matthew Mead
17. W. S. Graham, Kathleen Raine, David Gascoyne
18. A. Alvarez, Roy Fuller, Anthony Thwaite
19. John Ashbery, Lee Harwood, Tom Raworth
20. John Heath-Stubbs, F. T. Prince, Stephen Spender
21. George Mackay Brown, Norman MacCaig, Iain Crichton Smith
22. John Fuller, Peter Levi, Adrian Mitchell
23. Geoffrey Grigson, Edwin Muir, Adrian Stokes
24. Kenward Elmslie, Kenneth Koch, James Schuyler
25. Gavin Ewart, Zulfikar Ghose, B. S. Johnson — 1975
26. Dannie Abse, D.J. Enright, Michael Longley
27. John Ormond, Emyr Humphreys, John Tripp

== Penguin Modern Poets (second series) ==
1. James Fenton, Blake Morrison, Kit Wright
2. Carol Ann Duffy, Vicki Feaver, Eavan Boland
3. Glyn Maxwell, Mick Imlah, Peter Reading — 1995
4. Liz Lochhead, Roger McGough, Sharon Olds — 1995
5. Simon Armitage, Sean O'Brien, Tony Harrison
6. U. A. Fanthorpe, Elma Mitchell, Charles Causley
7. Donald Davie, Samuel Menashe, Allen Curnow
8. Jackie Kay, Merle Collins, Grace Nichols
9. John Burnside, Robert Crawford, Kathleen Jamie
10. Douglas Oliver, Denise Riley, Iain Sinclair
11. Michael Donaghy, Andrew Motion, Hugo Williams — 1997
12. Helen Dunmore, Jo Shapcott, Matthew Sweeney
13. Michael Hofmann, Michael Longley, Robin Robertson

== Penguin Modern Poets (third series) ==
1. Emily Berry, Anne Carson, Sophie Collins (If I'm Scared We Can't Win, 2016)
2. Michael Robbins, Patricia Lockwood, Timothy Thornton (Controlled Explosions, 2016)
3. Malika Booker, Sharon Olds, Warsan Shire (Your Family, Your Body, 2017)
4. Kathleen Jamie, Don Paterson, Nick Laird (Other Ways to Leave the Room, 2017)
5. Sam Riviere, Frederick Seidel, Kathryn Maris (Occasional Wild Parties, 2017)
6. Maggie Nelson, Denise Riley, Claudia Rankine (Die Deeper into Life, 2017)
7. Toby Martinez de las Rivas, Geoffrey Hill, Rowan Evans (These Hard and Shining Things, 2018)
