= Liz Lefroy =

British poet (born 1964)

Elizabeth Lefroy (born 9 December 1964) is a British poet.

== Poetry ==
Lefroy's first publication was Pretending the Weather (2011) Gillian Clarke, the National Poet of Wales, said of it: "Liz Lefroy's first slim pamphlet is a triumph. These delicately told human moments sound with the perfect pitch of a true poet. Using not a word too many, she lets us read between the lines."

Pretending The Weather was followed by The Gathering (2012), a meditation on the Anglican liturgy set to music by Brian Evans. It premiered at the 2012 St Chad's Music Festival, Shrewsbury. Her next publication in 2014 was Mending the Ordinary. Of this, Philip Gross wrote, "Nothing is ordinary in these poems, in the sense of unremarkable. They deal with moments that come in the order of our lives, with people growing, leaving, passing or being remembered. But the effect of the poems is to lift them slightly out of time, into a perspective that is tender and quizzical, alert for more." Her most recent pamphlet is 'GREAT MASTER / small boy', published by Fair Acre Press in 2021 and endorsed by John Suchet and Andrew McMillan. It is a musical journey across Europe and childhood, with Ludwig Van Beethoven as one of the central characters. It explores the tensions and creative spaces that exist between an artist's talents and their humanity.

Lefroy's poems have also appeared in Mslexia, PN Review, Standpoint Magazine, Poetry Wales, Under the Radar, Magma, The North, The Frogmore Papers. Ink, Sweat and Tears, Wenlock Poetry Anthologies 2013, 2015 and 2016, The Emergency Poet Anthology (edited by Deborah Alma, 2015), and the Picador Anthology celebrating independent bookshops: Off the Shelf – A Celebration of Bookshops in Verse, edited by Carol Ann Duffy (2016), and the WOLF Anthology 2019. She was the Selected poet for Magma 71, 2018, Film Issue.

Other collaborations include performances of Sweet Thunder: A Show in Three Layers, with Lucy Aphramor and Amy Godfrey. Its tour included the Edinburgh Fringe in 2013 and 2015, Shrewsbury, Coventry and Manchester. She wrote poems to accompany the photographs of Alex Ramsay's OS for the Presteigne Festival (2014). She was part of the Malign Species project (2015-16 Fair Acre Press http://fairacrepress.co.uk/projects/), and Still Life, a performance with Carol Caffrey about love and loss.

== Events and appearances ==
In 2012, Lefroy founded Shrewsbury Poetry, a monthly event in which local and national poets perform their work. This outgrew its venue in 2014 and is now at The Hive, Belmont, Shrewsbury, on the second Tuesday of every month. Lefroy now co-hosts the event with fellow poet, Jean Atkin. Guest writers have included Andrew McMillan, Liz Berry, Deborah Alma, James Sheard, Jonathan Edwards, Fred D'Aguiar, Helen Ivory, Martin Figura, Adam Horovitz, Lucy English, Rosie Shepperd, Roger Garfitt, Chris Hardy, Claire Williamson, Katrina Naomi, Matthew Stewart, Ross Donlon, Naomi Paul, Gareth Owen, Paul Mortimer and Philip Gross.

Lefroy appeared regularly on BBC Radio Shropshire as a guest of Ryan Kennedy, reading poetry and highlighting forthcoming poetry events in and around Shropshire until the end of 2019. She featured at a poetry reading in November 2014 in Shrewsbury with Carol Ann Duffy and Gillian Clarke. was curator of the Poetry Busk at the Wenlock Poetry Festival 2015 and 2016 where she has also given readings alongside James Sheard, Kathleen Jamie, Andrew McMillan and Don Paterson. She was part of the Shore to Shore Tour in June 2016 and performed in Bridgnorth alongside Carol Ann Duffy, Gillian Clarke, Imtiaz Dharker, Jackie Kay and musician John Sampson, and has read with Anna Selby, Clare Shaw, and Choman Hardi at the Poetry Pharmacy in Bishops Castle.https://www.poetrypharmacy.co.uk/bishops-castle

== Awards ==
In 2011 she won the first Roy Fisher Prize, an award for new work in poetry which was endowed by Carol Ann Duffy. She was highly commended in the Bridport Poetry Prize 2015. She won first prize in the Café Writers Competition 2016, and was Runner Up in the Wigtown Festival Competition 2017, and third in the WOLF Competition 2019.

== Work ==
Lefroy has worked at Wrexham University, an educational institution in North Wales, since 2006, as a senior lecturer in social care and from August 2026 as Reader in Creative Coproduction. Her academic interests centre on the use of creative methods in social work education as a means of ensuring the participation of experts through experience in the curriculum. At the start of her career, Lefroy worked in Edinburgh as a lecturer in an FE (further education) college and an education officer in local authority day services for people with learning disabilities. After moving to Shropshire in 1992, she worked first for the local authority and then to the voluntary sector, where she managed a staff team supporting people with visual impairments and complex needs.

== Education ==
Lefroy was educated at South Hampstead High School, London, and Durham University (St Mary's College) and thereafter did post-graduate degrees first in Psychology and then Creative Writing at Keele University. She also has a PGCE from Bristol University and is a Fellow of the Higher Education Academy.

== Family ==
Lefroy has two sons, Gabriel and Jonty. Much of her work focuses on the rich experiences of motherhood. Jonty Lefroy Watt, a composer, has set several of her her poems to music, with a recording of a string quartet, LuX, inspired by Lefroy's writing available here LuX - String Quartet. Jonty Lefroy Watt (2025)..

== Bibliography ==
- Pretending the Weather, Long Face Press (March 2011), ISBN 0956850308
- The Gathering, Long Face Press (2012), ISBN 978-0-9568503-3-1
- Mending the Ordinary, Fair Acre Press (31 May 2014) ISBN 0956827578
- I Buy A New Washer, December 2020, Mark Time)
- GREAT MASTER / small boy, Fair Acre Press (4th June 2021)
- Festival in a Book - a celebration of Wenlock Poetry Festival (editor), 904 Press (September 2023)
