= Matthew Mead (poet) =

English poet

Matthew Mead (1924 in Buckinghamshire – 2009) was an English poet as well as a translator, with his wife Ruth, of German poets, including Johannes Bobrowski and Nelly Sachs. He edited the magazine Satis and lived in Germany. A selection of his poems appears in Penguin Modern Poets 16, together with Harry Guest and Jack Beeching.

His first book of poetry was Identities (1967) an exciting consummation of his concern with 'our time', with poetic experiment, and with 'the single poetic theme'. "His poems speak soberly of the essential things of our time," wrote Christopher Middleton; and Derek Parker commented in the Poetry Review "… Mead’s poems are carved out of intractable material, unlikely to warp with time. If they have not a permanent place, then the pressure of fashion is greater than one hopes." Anvil Poetry Press published "Word for Word," a selection of the Meads' translations, in 2008.
