= Sam Gardiner (poet) =

Northern Irish poet

- Born: Samuel Trevor Gardiner; 15 September 1936; Portadown, Northern Ireland
- Died: 22 May 2016 (aged 79)
- Occupations: Poet, Writer, Architect

Samuel Trevor Gardiner (1936–2016) was a Northern Irish poet, writer and architect.

== Life and work ==
He was born in Portadown, Armagh but lived most of his life in England, living in London through the 1970s and moving north to the Grimsby / North Lincolnshire area in the 1980s where he lived out the rest of his life. He first became well known in radical/literary circles as Trevor Gardiner, as part of Norman Hidden's Writers Workshop circle, where he was sub editor of New Poetry magazine and ghost-compiled Hidden's Over to You, a poetry anthology for students, for the English Speaking Board without formal credit, and whilst manager of the Poetry Bureau and later as editor of Poet's Yearbook. Issues in his personal life saw him abandon his London life, and move initially to Cleethorpes. He worked as an architect through the 80s, writing creatively about historic architecture at this time. He came to national attention when he unexpectedly won the 1993 National Poetry Competition, which he had entered - almost as an afterthought - under the name Sam Gardiner, for his poem 'Protestant Windows'. The award was presented on January 17 by Miroslav Holub, and his poem read at the prize-giving event by Hull poet Sean O'Brien, and subsequently published in The Guardian.

Following the win Sam Gardiner retired to write full time and published new work regularly across British, Irish and international poetry magazines. He was Lincolnshire Millennium Laureate in 1999/2000, was repeatedly long-listed for the Forward Prize, and won the Poetry Business pamphlet prize for his 'Picture Never Taken' in 2006. He became a key figure in local poetry circles around his adopted Grimsby, founding long-running poetry groups in Louth and Lincoln in the 90s and Hull and Nunsthorpe in the 2000s. After a long period 'under consideration' by Faber, Gardiner became frustrated and embarrassed by the prestigious publisher's failure to make a decision on his first collection, and withdrew his work in the hope he could publish a series of small press pamphlets. Instead he was picked up by Lagan Press who published a series of three long collections over the next 15 years Protestant Windows (2000), Night Ships (2006) and The Morning After (2011). These collections found very strong markets in the UK, Ireland but particularly in the USA. Gardiner continued to publish prolifically in magazines, newspapers and journals. He died in 2016 of COPD.

== Bibliography ==
=== Poetry collections ===
- 1999 Lincolnshire's Millennium Poet
- 2000 Protestant Windows
- 2004 The Picture Never Taken
- 2007 The Night Ships
- 2008 Southumbrian Tidings
- 2010 The Morning After

=== Significant Anthology Appearances ===
- 1976 New Poems 1976-77: A P.E.N. Anthology of Contemporary Poetry ed. Howard Sergeant Hutchinson (London, England)
- 2004 The New Irish Poets ed. Selina Guinness, Bloodaxe Books (Newcastle, England)
- 2006 Magnetic North: The Emerging Poets ed. John Brown, Verbal Arts Centre (Derry, Ulster)
- 2007 Best of Irish Poetry 2007 ed. Maurice Riordan Colm Breathnach, South-word Editions (Munster, Ireland)
- 2008 The Forward Book of Poetry 2009 ed. Frieda Hughes Faber (London, England)
- 2009 The Forward Book of Poetry 2010 ed. Josephine Hart Faber (London, England)
- 2015 Something Happens, Sometimes Here: Contemporary Lincolnshire poetry ed. Rory Waterman, Five Leaves (Nottingham, England)
- 2020 The SHOp: An Anthology of Poetry eds. Hilary Wakeman and Hilary Elfick

=== Works in Translation ===
- 2009 De nooit gemaakte foto: vijf gedichten translator Ko Kooman, Wagner & Van Santen (Sliedrecht, Holland)

=== Publications as editor (as S.T. Gardiner) ===
- 1971-6 Workshop New Poetry (poetry journal, ed. Norman Hidden) as assistant editor
- 1975 Poet's Year Book 1976
- 1976 Poet's Year Book 1977
- 1977 Poet's Year Book 1978
- 1977 Poetry Survey (Journal)
- 1977 Autumn Anthology: A Biographical Anthology of One Hundred Poets
- 1979 Poet's Year Book 1979

=== Prose (as Trevor Gardiner) ===
- 1988 Monasticism
- 1991 The Celtic church of Britain
- 1992-8 Reviews Seam poetry journal ed. Robert Etty. David Lightfoot
