= Rachael Boast =

British poet

Rachael Boast FRSL
- Born: 1975 (age 50–51); Suffolk, England, UK
- Education: University of Wolverhampton; University of St Andrews
- Occupations: Poet and Editor
- Writing career
- Notable awards: Seamus Heaney Prize (2012); Forward Prize (2011)

Rachael Boast (born 1975) is a British poet, editor and disability advocate. She has published five poetry collections, numerous pamphlets and has edited three anthologies of poetry.

== Biography ==
Rachael Boast was born in Bury St Edmunds, Suffolk, in 1975. She studied English and Philosophy at the University of Wolverhampton, graduating in 1996. After graduating, she moved to Bristol, becoming involved in the city's rich arts and cultural scene, and publishing five limited edition pamphlets of her early work. Between 2005 and 2009, Boast lived in Scotland, studying for an MLitt in Creative Writing at University of St Andrews under the tutorship of Scottish poets, Douglas Dunn, Kathleen Jamie and Don Paterson. This was followed by a PhD thesis titled "Dark Saying: An Examination of Poetic Technique with Reference to The Book of Job", which explored Biblical Hebrew Poetry with attention to the question of suffering, faith and the nature of being.

Boast's literary influences include Persian and Urdu poets, Rumi, Ghalib and Hafez, along with Faiz Ahmed Faiz, Mirabai, Sappho, Anna Akhmatova, Samuel Taylor Coleridge, Geoffrey Hill, Arthur Rimbaud, and poet, artist, and filmmaker Jean Cocteau.

Boast's first published poem appeared under an alias in SUFI Journal in 2001 and her first poetry collection, Sidereal, was published ten years later in 2011. It won the Forward Prize for Best First Collection and the Seamus Heaney Centre First Collection Poetry Prize. Her second collection, Pilgrim's Flower (2013), was shortlisted for The Griffin Poetry Prize. Void Studies (2016), her third collection, was shortlisted for the T.S. Eliot Prize. Her fourth collection, Hotel Raphael, was published in 2021 and her fifth, Volvelle, in 2026. Her work is published by Picador.

Boast's work has been described as "remarkable for its intense lyricism, its metaphysical warmth and precision. Although Boast’s poems do not depict life in any autobiographical sense, they do show us, perhaps more interestingly, a mind in action, a mind that connects with an electric charge to place, people, language."

She has published in national and international literary magazines and journals, including Ars Notoria, Archipelago, Bad Lilies, Blackbox Manifold, Chicago Review, Cordite Poetry Review, Financial Times, the Guardian, Poetry, Poetry Ireland Review, The Poetry Review and Times Literary Supplement. Her work has also appeared in the anthologies Stairs and Whispers: D/deaf and Disabled Poets Write Back (Nine Arches, 2017), Staying Human (Bloodaxe Books, 2020) and 100 Poems to Save the Earth (Seren, 2021).

Alongside her poetry collections, Boast has edited three anthologies of poetry: The Echoing Gallery: Bristol Poets and Art in the City (with Patrick Burley and Adam Hanna - Redcliffe Press, 2013), The Caught Habits of Language: An Entertainment for W.S. Graham for Him Having Reached One Hundred (with Andy Ching and Nathan Hamilton - Donut Press, 2018) and the international anthology, Versus Versus: 100 Poems by Deaf, Disabled & Neurodivergent Poets, which was published in 2025 by Bloodaxe Books. Versus Versus won a Literature Matters Award from the Royal Society of Literature in 2023, and was a Poetry Book Society Recommendation. Readings from the anthology took place throughout 2025-2026, including at The Southbank Centre in London, StAnza Poetry Festival (Scotland's International Poetry Festival), Lyra Poetry Festival (Bristol) and Poetry in Aldeburgh (Suffolk). Online events celebrating the anthology took place in the UK in May 2025 and in the US in September 2026.

Boast was elected a Fellow of the Royal Society of Literature in 2022.

== Poetry collections ==
- Sidereal, Picador (2011)
- Pilgrim's Flower, Picador (2013)
- Void Studies, Picador (2016)
- Hotel Raphael, Picador (2021)
- Volvelle, Picador (2026)

== Awards ==
- (2011) Forward Prize for best first collection.
- (2012) Seamus Heaney Centre for Poetry Prize for best first collection.
- (2014) Griffin Poetry Prize shortlist for Pilgrim's Flower
- (2015) Bristol Poetry Prize for poem Belle Époque
- (2016) T. S. Eliot Prize shortlist for Void Studies
