= Michael Donaghy =

American poet

Michael Donaghy (May 24, 1954 – September 16, 2004) was a New York City poet and musician, who lived in London from 1985.

== Life and career ==
Donaghy was born into an Irish family and grew up with his sister Patricia in the Bronx, New York, losing both parents in their early thirties. He studied at Fordham University and did postgraduate work at the University of Chicago, where, at 25, he edited the Chicago Review. Donaghy commented: "I owe everything I know about poetry to the public library system (in New York City) and not to my miseducation at university [...] I mean, the Bronx, who knows, now it may be full of cappuccino bars and bookshops, but back in those days it wasn't. My parents would say something like 'go out and play in the burning wreckage until dinnertime' and I'd make a beeline for the library." He founded the acclaimed Irish music ensemble Samradh Music and played the tin whistle, the bodhran and was a flute player of distinction, music echoing in the themes and forms of his writing.

In 1985, he moved to just off Green Lanes in Harringay, north London to join his partner and fellow musician, Maddy Paxman, whom he married in 2003; their son, Ruairi Donaghy, was born in 1996. He joined the London poetry workshop, founded by the Belfast poet Robert Greacen and later chaired by Matthew Sweeney, whose members included Vicki Feaver, Ruth Padel, Jo Shapcott, Maurice Riordan, Eva Salzman and Don Paterson. Rapidly establishing himself on the poetry scene, he published his first full collection, Shibboleth, in 1988 - the title poem of which won second prize in the 1987 National Poetry Competition. Errata followed in 1993, and Conjure in 2000. Recognition came in the form of the Geoffrey Faber and Cholmondeley awards and the Whitbread and Forward prizes, among others. In 2003, he teamed up with Cyborg scientist Kevin Warwick and wrote Grimoire. He continued to play in various Irish music groups, as well as the early line-up of Lammas, the jazz/traditional crossover band led by Tim Garland and poet Don Paterson. He was a creative writing tutor for the Arvon Foundation and the Poetry Society and later ran an extension course for City University London, as well as teaching poetry classes at Birkbeck College, London, which awards an annual prize in his name. He wrote and reviewed for Poetry Review, Poetry, The New Yorker and The Times Literary Supplement. His poetry, influential to a younger generation of poets, is noted for its metaphysical elegance and playfulness, and his skillful use of form.

== Death ==
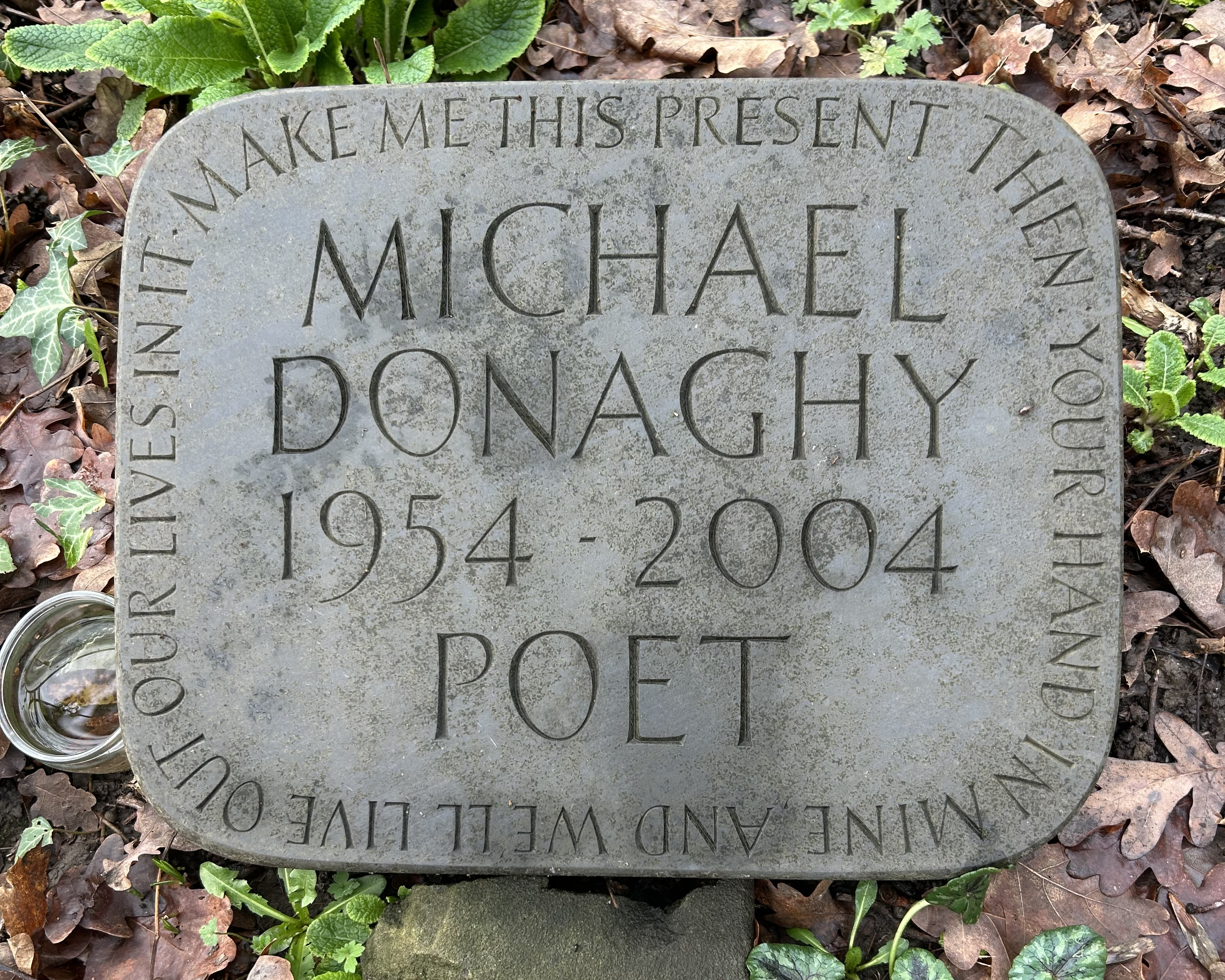
Grave of Michael Donaghy in Highgate Cemetery

He died suddenly of a brain haemorrhage on September 16, 2004. David Wheatley wrote in The Guardian: "The death of Michael Donaghy in 2004 at the age of 50 has been one of the most deeply felt losses to the poetry world in recent years. Not since Sylvia Plath almost half a century ago had an American poet living in Britain so decisively entered the bloodstream of his times." The Times described him as "one of the most widely respected figures on the British poetry scene and a fierce defender of poetry as a source of pleasure and truth." His fourth collection Safest was published posthumously in 2005 and a prose collection The Shape of the Dance in 2009. His ashes were interred in Highgate Cemetery on the anniversary of his death in 2005.

== Honours and awards ==
- 1987: National Poetry Competition (2nd Prize)
- 1989: Whitbread Prize for Poetry
- 1990: Geoffrey Faber Memorial Prize
- 1992: Arts Council Writers Award
- 1994: Selected for New Generation Poets Promotion
- 1999: Arts Council Writers Award
- 1999: The Poetry Society Reader in Residence
- 1999: Fellow of the Royal Society of Literature
- 2000: Poetry Book Society Choice, Conjure
- 2000: Forward Poetry Prize (Best Collection) for Conjure

== Selected works ==
- 1988 Shibboleth, Oxford University Press
- 1993 Errata, Oxford University Press
- 1997 Penguin Modern Poets 11 (contributor with Andrew Motion and Hugo Williams), London: Penguin
- 2000 Dances Learned Last Night: Poems 1975-1995, London: Picador
- 2000 Conjure Picador
- 2005 101 Poems about Childhood (editor), London: Faber & Faber
- 2005 Michael Donaghy Reading from his poems (CD), The Poetry Archive
- 2009 Collected Poems, Picador (posthumous)
- 2009 The Shape of the Dance: Essays, Interviews and Digressions Picador (posthumous)
