= The Frogmore Papers =

Frogmore Papers No. 67, artwork by John Fowler

The Frogmore Papers is a quarterly literary magazine published in the United Kingdom. The magazine is published by The Frogmore Press, founded by Andre Evans and Jeremy Page at the Frogmore tea-rooms in Folkestone (once a favourite haunt of H. G. Wells) in 1983. The magazine is based in Lewes, East Sussex and is edited by Jeremy Page, with the assistance of Clare Best, Rachel Playforth, and Peter Stewart. Besides The Frogmore Papers, The Frogmore Press has also published both individual collections and anthologies.

The Frogmore Papers have published hundreds of new, neglected and established writers. Notable contributors have included Tobias Hill, Sophie Hannah, Susan Wicks, Elizabeth Bartlett, Brian Aldiss, Carole Satyamurti, Paul Groves, Mario Petrucci, Matthew Mead, Tamar Yoseloff, Frances Leviston, Katherine Pierpoint, Andrew Waterhouse, John Harvey, Pauline Stainer, Ian Caws, Jill Dawson, Jane Holland, Robert Seatter, Catherine Smith, Stewart Conn, Clare Pollard, Susan Wicks, Michael Swan, Christopher James and Andrew Waterman.
