= Kathryn Maris =

London-based American poet and critic

- Maris, 2020
- Born: Kathryn Anne Maris; January 1971 (age 55); Long Island, New York
- Education: BA in English Literature; MA in Creative Writing
- Alma mater: Columbia University; Boston University
- Occupations: Poet, critic
- Writing career
- Genres: Poetry; Criticism
- Notable work: The House with Only an Attic and a Basement
- Notable awards: Ivan Juritz Prize for Creative Experiment, 2019

Kathryn Maris (born January 1971) is a poet, critic and curator of Greek descent from Long Island, New York. A portion of her 2018 collection The House with Only an Attic and a Basement (Penguin) won her the Ivan Juritz Prize for Creative Experiment in 2019. She was also a part of the Penguin Modern Poets series with the Penguin Modern Poets 5, put together with Sam Riviere and Frederick Seidel. Her previous collections include God Loves You (Seren, 2013) and The Book of Jobs (Four Way Books, 2006).

== Life and education ==
Born on Long Island, Maris moved to New York City and received a BA in English literature from Columbia University. She then earned an MA in creative writing from Boston University, received fellowships from Yaddo and the Fine Arts Work Center in Provincetown, and moved to London in 1999.

As of 2022, she is pursuing a creative writing PhD at Durham with a focus on narcissism.

== Career ==
Maris has published her poetry in The Guardian, New Statesman, and Modern Poetry in Translation, among others, and her "essays questioning orthodoxies in contemporary poetry." She has performed her poetry at festivals, including at the Cork International Poetry Festival, The Creative Unconscious Psychoanalytic Poetry Festival 2015, Poetry in Aldeburgh, and elsewhere. She was also part of the F. T. Prince Memorial Lecture in 2021, and has curated a number of events and exhibitions. Writing about her poetry reading at the Bodmin Moor Festival in 2019, Morag Smith says:

"[Maris] spins a bitter candyfloss. Without ever foregrounding her virtues she creates fast confessional poetry that breaks your heart even as you laugh. ‘I am a terrible liar,’ she says. Continuously misrepresenting herself in a stunning portrait of the stifling social constraints of being 'mother' or 'sister'."

Maris has edited Mal journal and co-organised the Poetry and Psychoanalysis conference. She served as selecting editor for Nine Arches Press's inaugural Primers volume in 2015. It was then published in 2016. Maris has also taught at Morley College, Arvon and The Poetry School. She was awarded the 2019 Ivan Juritz Prize for Creative Experiment for "[d]epicting conflicts within the self as well as the confusion and cruelty of modern life". She was later awarded a residency at Cove Park as part of the Prize. Maris was also a Royal Literary Fund Fellow, and a resident at Maison Dora Maar in March 2024. In an episode of the BBC podcast 'The Verb', she argued that younger poets in Britain are finding psychoanalysis to be "a rich source of inspiration."

=== Books ===
Maris's first full-length collection, The Book of Jobs, offering "glimpses into the wonderment, humor, and suffering" of individuals was published by Four Way Books in 2006. Her second, God Loves You, was published by Seren in 2013. Its title poem appeared in Ploughshares. Writing for the Fortnightly Review, Anthony Howell said that "Maris is sensitive to the ironies of humdrum existence, to its surprises." Another review praised it for its "more than artful parody" and added "sly wit". In 2016, 2008 was published by Sam Riviere as a limited-edition pamphlet for If a Leaf Falls Press. In 2017, she appeared with Frederick Seidel and Sam Riviere in the fifth Penguin Modern Poets book, titled Occasional Wild Parties.

Cover of The House With Only an Attic and a Basement

Maris's third poetry collection, The House with Only an Attic and a Basement, was praised for being a "crisp, funny, lightly disturbing collection." The collection's title poem first appeared in Poetry's December 2015 issue. Julian Stannard, who called Maris "mistress of deadpan, litany of mischief" noted the title poem for "its own sweaty poetics of space". Another of the poems, 'The X Man', was collected as part of the "Blockbuster Movie Poems" by the Poetry Foundation, and Maris, for the poem 'How to Be a Dream Girl Not a Doormat about the 'Ex", receives praises for having "spun pop-culture self-help" into her poetic work. Amy McCauley, writing for The Poetry School, likened it with her previous collection God Loves You for the examination of "the tensions" present in both. In his review, Stannard also notes that "some of the [collection's] poems smell of psychotherapists' waiting rooms". Geraldine Clarkson, one of the poets in the Primers Volume One, called it an "impatiently" awaited collection.

Both God Loves You and The House with Only an Attic and a Basement were among The Poetry School's "Books of the Year" in their respective years of publication. God Loves You was praised for dealing "with some of the prickliest of emotions: jealously, resentment and spite", and the latter for its approach to "interiors and exteriors" – "the insides of people's minds and relationships" and, as noted by Ali Lewis, their performances.

== Books ==
- The Book of Jobs (Four Way Books, 2006) ISBN 9781884800719
- God Loves You (Seren, 2013) ISBN 9781781720356
- 2008 (If a Leaf Falls Press, 2016)
- Penguin Modern Poets 5: Occasional Wild Parties (Penguin, 2017) ISBN 9780141987088
- The House with Only an Attic and a Basement (Penguin, 2018) ISBN 9780141986579

=== As editor ===
- Primers: Volume One, with Jane Commane (Nine Arches Press, 2016) ISBN 9781911027034

== Awards ==
- 2008: Special Commendation, Troubadour Poetry Prize 2008, for 'Darling, Would You Please Pick Up Those Books'
- 2009: Special Commendation, Troubadour Poetry Prize 2009, for 'This is a Confessional Poem'
- 2020: Ivan Juritz Prize for Creative Experiment, 2019
