= Rain (poetry collection) =

Rain is a collection of poetry by the Scottish poet Don Paterson. It was published in 2009 by Faber and Faber and won the Forward poetry prize for best poetry collection of the same year.

== Contents ==
"Man is air in the air and in order to become a point in the air he has to fall."

— Antonio Porchia

Rain opens with a quote from Antonio Porchia and Paterson regularly works off the work of other writers (often non-English language writers) such as Slavoj Žižek, Li Po, and César Vallejo. Rain contains 30 poems. Aside from the title poem some of the more famous poems included are:

- Two Trees
- The Swing
- Renku: My Last Thirty-Five Deaths
- The Bathysphere
- Phantom
Verse

He's three year deid, and aa I've done is greet.
wi a toom pen an nae elegy but och.
I've jist nae hert to mak a poem o it.
I stole that line from Robert Garioch

— Don Paterson, Rain (2009)

The collection features poems dedicated to both of Paterson's children, the founder of origami Akira Yoshizawa, and the poet Michael Longley; the book is also dedicated, as a whole, to Michael Donaghy. As in his earlier collections, Paterson uses Scottish Dialect in many of the shorter lyrics in this work - words such as 'tae', 'och', 'wi' and 'gairdie'. He sometimes glosses such dialects, as in 'The Human Shield', but does not always, as in 'Verse'. In comparison to his eelier collections, Paterson's use of traditional forms seems limited: Rain features only one Sonnet, 'Miguel', a form that would dominate his next collection 40 Sonnets (2015), as well as a Renku, and many poems of quatrain stanzas. However he predominantly writes in free verse, and blank verse.

== Bibliography ==
- Don Paterson (9 September 2014). Rain: Poems. Farrar, Straus and Giroux. ISBN 978-1-4668-8068-9.
