= John Stammers =

British poet and writer (born 1954)

John Stammers (born 1954 Islington, London) is a British poet and writer.

== Life ==
Stammers read philosophy at King's College London and is an Associate of King's College. He took up writing poetry in his 30s, joining Michael Donaghy’s City University poetry group. Stammers now teaches at City Lit. In 2002/03 he was appointed Judith E Wilson Fellow at the University of Cambridge. He has edited Magma magazine and was convenor of the British and Irish Contemporary Poetry Conference. His work has also appeared in London Review of Books, The New Republic, Poetry Daily (US), Poetry Review and various broadsheets.

John Stammers lives in Oxfordshire with his two sons, his partner and her daughter.

== Awards ==
- 2001 Forward Prize for Best First Collection (for Panoramic Lounge-Bar)
- 2001 Whitbread Poetry Award shortlisted (for Panoramic Lounge-Bar)
- 2005 Waterstones Best New Poetry (for 'Stolen Love Behaviour')
- 2005 Poetry Book Society Choice (for 'Stolen Love Behaviour')
- 2005 Forward Prize for Best Collection (shortlist) (for 'Stolen Love Behaviour')
- 2005 TS Eliot Award (shortlist) (for 'Stolen Love Behaviour')

== Works ==
- Panoramic Lounge-bar (Picador, 2001)
- Buffalo Bills (pamphlet, Donut Press, 2004)
- Stolen Love Behaviour (Picador, 2005)
- Interior Night (Picador, 2010)
- The Picador Book of Love Poems (Editor, Picador, 2011)
- Gerard Manley Hopkins – Poet to Poet (Editor, Faber and Faber, 2012)
