= Glister =

Glister may refer to:

- Glister (Forgotten Realms), a fictional city in the Forgotten Realms
- Glister, a 2008 novel by John Burnside, published as The Glister in the United States

• Glister (Amway), a dental care american brand owned by Amway.
