= Christopher James (poet) =

British poet (born 1975)

- Born: 1975 (age 50–51)
- Education: University of East Anglia (MA)
- Occupation: Poet

Christopher James (born 1975) is a British poet.

== Life ==
Christopher James was educated at Newcastle and the University of East Anglia, where he graduated with an MA in Creative Writing. He now lives in Suffolk with his wife and young family. He works in London as head of corporate communications for the Scout Association. Prior to this he worked in advertising for both J&L Group and CPG Yorkshire selling advertising features to business-to-business magazines.

His work has appeared in The Rialto (poetry magazine), Smiths Knoll, The London Magazine, Iota, The Frogmore Papers and Magma.

== Awards ==
James has previously won the Bridport, and Ledbury poetry prizes, and the 2008 National Poetry Competition.

== Work ==
- John Lennon on the Great Wall of China
- The Invention of Butterfly, 2006, Ragged Raven Poetry, ISBN 978-0-9542397-9-4
