= Phoebe Power =

British poet (born 1993)

- Born: 1993 (age 32–33); Newcastle-upon-Tyne, England, United Kingdom
- Education: University of Cambridge
- Occupation: Poet
- Writing career
- Notable work: Shrines of Upper Austria
- Notable awards: Forward Prizes for Poetry; Somerset Maugham Award
- Website: phoebepowerpoetry.wordpress.com

Phoebe Power (born 1993) is a British poet whose work, Shrines of Upper Austria, won the Forward Prize for Poetry for Best First Collection.

== Biography ==
Phoebe Power was born in Newcastle upon Tyne in 1993. She was named a Foyle Young Poet of the Year in 2010. She later studied at the University of Cambridge where she led the Pembroke Poetry Society. Power was a recipient of the Eric Gregory Award from the Society of Authors in 2012.

Power's full length poetry collection, Shrines of Upper Austria, was published by Carcanet Press in 2018. She was awarded the Forward Prize for Poetry for Best First Collection for the work. The book was named one of four Poetry Book Society Spring Recommendations for 2018 and has been shortlisted for the 2018 T. S. Eliot Prize. The collection was inspired by the life of Power's Austrian grandmother, who married a British soldier and emigrated to England after World War II.

Power lives in York.

== Work ==
- —— (2012). Harp Duet (paperback 1st ed.). London: Eyewear Publishing. ISBN 9781911335085.
- —— (2018). Shrines of Upper Austria (paperback 1st ed.). Manchester: Carcanet. ISBN 9781784105341.
- ——; Porteous, Katrina (2021). Sea Change (paperback 1st ed.). Cornwall: Guillemot Press. ISBN 9781913749125.
- —— (2022). Book of Days (paperback 1st ed.). Manchester: Carcanet. ISBN 9781800171787.

== Awards ==
Year	Work	Award	Category	Result	Ref.
2010	—	Foyle Young Poet of the Year	—	Selection	
2012	—	Eric Gregory Award	—	Won	
2014	—	Northern Writers' Awards	Poetry	Won	
2018	Shrines of Upper Austria	Forward Prizes for Poetry	First Collection	Won	
2018	Shrines of Upper Austria	T. S. Eliot Prize	—	Shortlisted	
2019	Shrines of Upper Austria	Somerset Maugham Award	—	Won	
