= Black Cat Bone (poetry collection) =

Book by John Burnside

- Author: John Burnside
- Language: English
- Genre: Poetry
- Publisher: Jonathan Cape
- Publication place: United Kingdom
- Pages: 80
- Awards: Forward Prize for Best Poetry Collection; T. S. Eliot Prize
- ISBN: 9780224093859
- Preceded by: The Hunt in the Forest
- Followed by: All One Breath

Black Cat Bone is a poetry collection by John Burnside, published in 2011 by Jonathan Cape. It was the Scottish poet's 11th collection.

According to Fiona Sampson writing in The Independent:

"Black Cat Bone distils its dreamscapes into four sections. The opening long poem, "The Fair Chase", is followed by "Everafter", an exploration of romantic love and its repeated disappointment; "Black Cat Bone", haunted by images of a murdered girl; and "Faith", a series of poems broadly concerned with keeping faith with the human condition".

Black Cat Bone won the Forward Prize for Best Poetry Collection in 2011, a £10,000 award; and the T. S. Eliot Prize in 2012, a £15,000 award. As of 2023, Burnside was one of only three poets to have won both prizes for the same book.
