= Jack Beeching =

English poet, novelist and nonfiction writer

- Born: 8 May 1922; Sussex, England
- Died: 27 December 2001 (aged 79); Palma de Mallorca, Spain
- Occupation: Poet

Jack Beeching (8 May 1922 – 27 December 2001), born John Charles Stuart Beeching, was an English poet, novelist and nonfiction writer.

== Life ==
Beeching was born in Hastings, Sussex, England, on 8 May 1922 and died in Palma de Mallorca, Spain, on 27 December 2001. He served in the Fleet Air Arm during World War II. He married Gwendoline (Inez) Mathews in the early 1940s. This marriage produced one son, Matthew (1947). The couple was divorced in 1948. He married author and translator Amy Brown in 1950 and had a son, John, and a daughter, Laura. The couple was divorced in 1970, and he shared the rest of his life with his third wife Charlotte Mensforth, the painter. He had four children.

In 1956, he suffered serious chest injuries in an automobile accident. As a result, he had severe respiratory problems that forced him to live in warmer climates.

== Career ==
Beeching's poetry is considered moving, original, clear-sighted, compressed, and funny. This was a view expressed by the editor of Qualm in 2003, a high opinion shared by the editors at Penguin circa 1970, and reflected in his obituary in The Independent thirty years later, whose author speaks also of Beeching's 'disciplined metre, subtle half-rhyme and a luxuriant syntax which expressed at times distinctly "difficult" metaphysical concerns'. His writing in old age was perhaps at least as strong and trenchant as that of any of his peers of a similar age.

Although he continued to write until his death, during the second half of his life his work fell into neglect. This neglect was partly attributable to his having to live, because of his damaged lung, abroad in drier climates, including Greece, Turkey, Guatemala, Lucca, Genoa, Menton, and Mallorca. It was a life of near-poverty in tiny apartments.

He was published in Penguin Modern Poets No. 16 in 1970, and near the end of his life brought out a collection, Poems 1940-2000 (Art Ojo Nuevo). He was a novelist and writer of historical books, but stated "Poetry is my avocation; the other forms of writing are a means of livelihood".

Beeching translated poetry from French and Spanish, and wrote several plays for the London stage. He contributed to The New York Times and The Times.

The Arts Council of Great Britain gave him their Award to a Living Artist in 1967, and he was later granted a Civil List pension for "services to literature".

== Works ==
- Personal and Partisan Poems (poetry), Fred Ball, 1940.
- Aspects of Love (poetry), A. Swallow, 1950.
- Paper Doll (novel), Heinemann, 1950.
- Truth Is a Naked Lady (poetry), Myriad, 1957.
- Let Me See Your Face (novel), Heinemann, 1959.
- The Dakota Project, Delacorte, 1968.
- Penguin Modern Poets 16 (1970). Jack Beeching, Harry Guest and Matthew Mead.
- The Polythene Maidenhead (poetry), Penguin, 1970.
- (Editor and author of introduction) R. Hakluyt, Voyages and Discoveries: The Principal Navigations, Voyages, Traffiques and Discoveries of the English Nation, Penguin, 1972.
- The Chinese Opium Wars, Hutchinson, 1975, Harcourt, 1976.
- An Open Path: Christian Missionaries, 1515-1914, Hutchinson, 1979, Ross-Erikson, 1982.
- (With Dominique Grandmont) Images au Miroir: Mirror Images (in French and English), Piccolo Press, 1979.
- Death of a Terrorist (novel), Constable, 1981.
- The Galleys at Lepanto, Hutchinson, 1982, Scribner, 1983.
- Twenty-five Short Poems, Piccolo Press, 1982.
- Tides of Fortune, Hutchinson,1988
- The View from the Balloon, with drawings by Charlotte Mensforth, Piccolo, 1990.
- Poems (1940-2000), Art Ojo Nuevo, 2001.
