= Stephen Sexton =

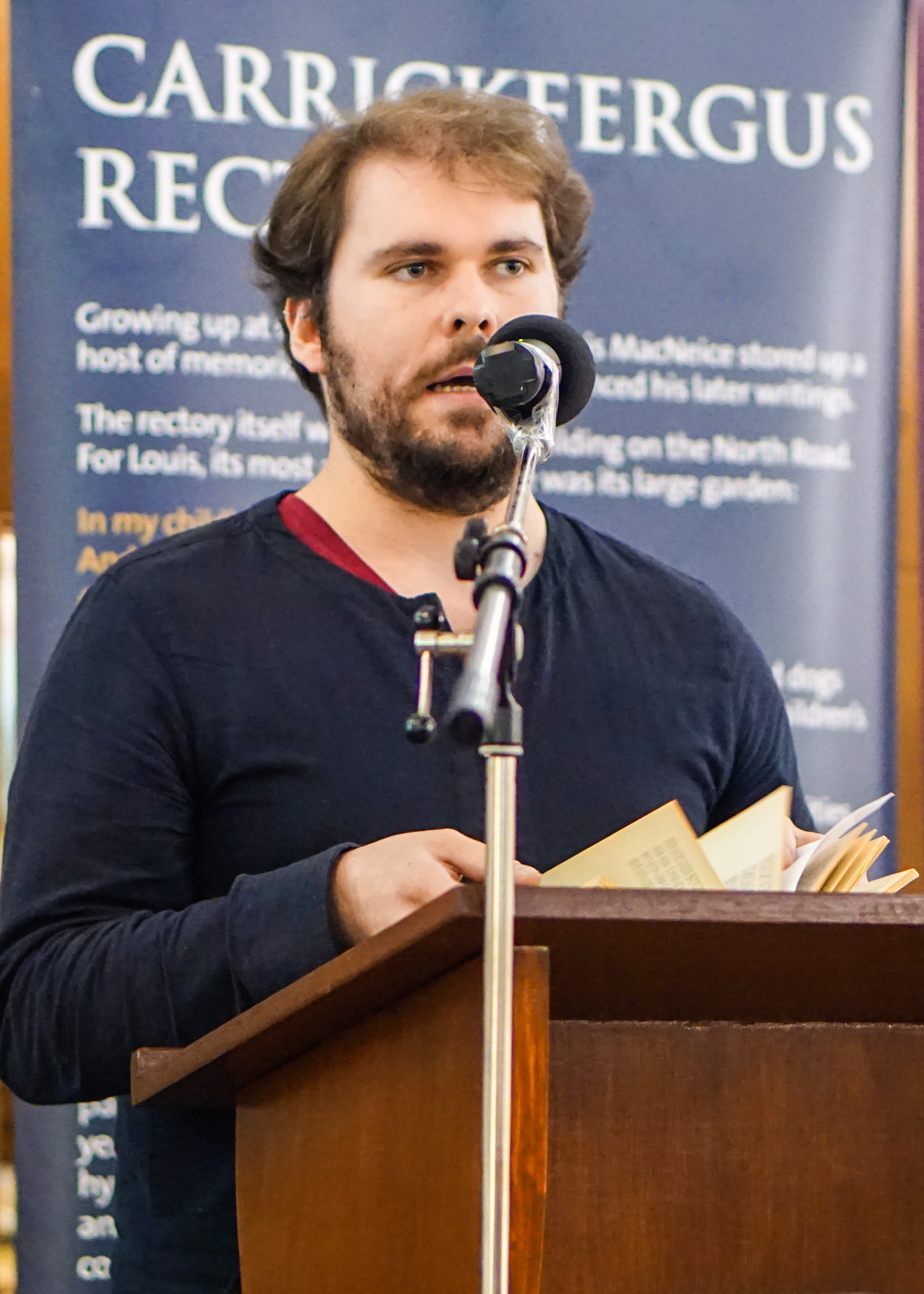
Sexton in 2014.

Stephen Sexton (born 1988) is a Northern Irish poet who lives in Belfast. In 2017 Sexton won the National Poetry Competition with his poem 'The Curfew'. Sexton received an Eric Gregory Award in 2018. In 2019 his poetry collection with Penguin Books If All the World and Love Were Young won the Forward Prize for Best First Collection. In 2020 If All the World and Love Were Young won the Rooney Prize for Irish Literature.

Sexton is a lecturer in Creative Writing and Poetry at Queen's University Belfast.
