= Tessa Biddington =

British poet

Tessa Biddington (born 1954 in Pinner, north-west London) is a British poet.

== Life ==
Biddington works as a freelance trainer, raising awareness about domestic violence. She began writing in 1996. Her poetry has appeared in New Welsh Review. In 2002, FAW! commissioned local poets Tessa Biddington and Keith Morgan; this work was featured on Forest of Dean Community Radio and performed at the Cheltenham Literature Festival.

== Awards ==
- 2000 Forward Poetry Prize for the best single poem "The Death of Descartes"
- 2001 Ottakar's Faber National Poetry Competition with Lantern Show, Scott Base
- 2021: Second Award of the Wales Poetry Award

== Work ==
- The Weight of Water, Like Starlings, Tess Biddington and Adam Burbage

=== Anthologies ===
- The Forward Book of Poetry 2001, Forward Publishing, 2000
