= Kathryn Simmonds =

British poet, and short story writer (born 1972)

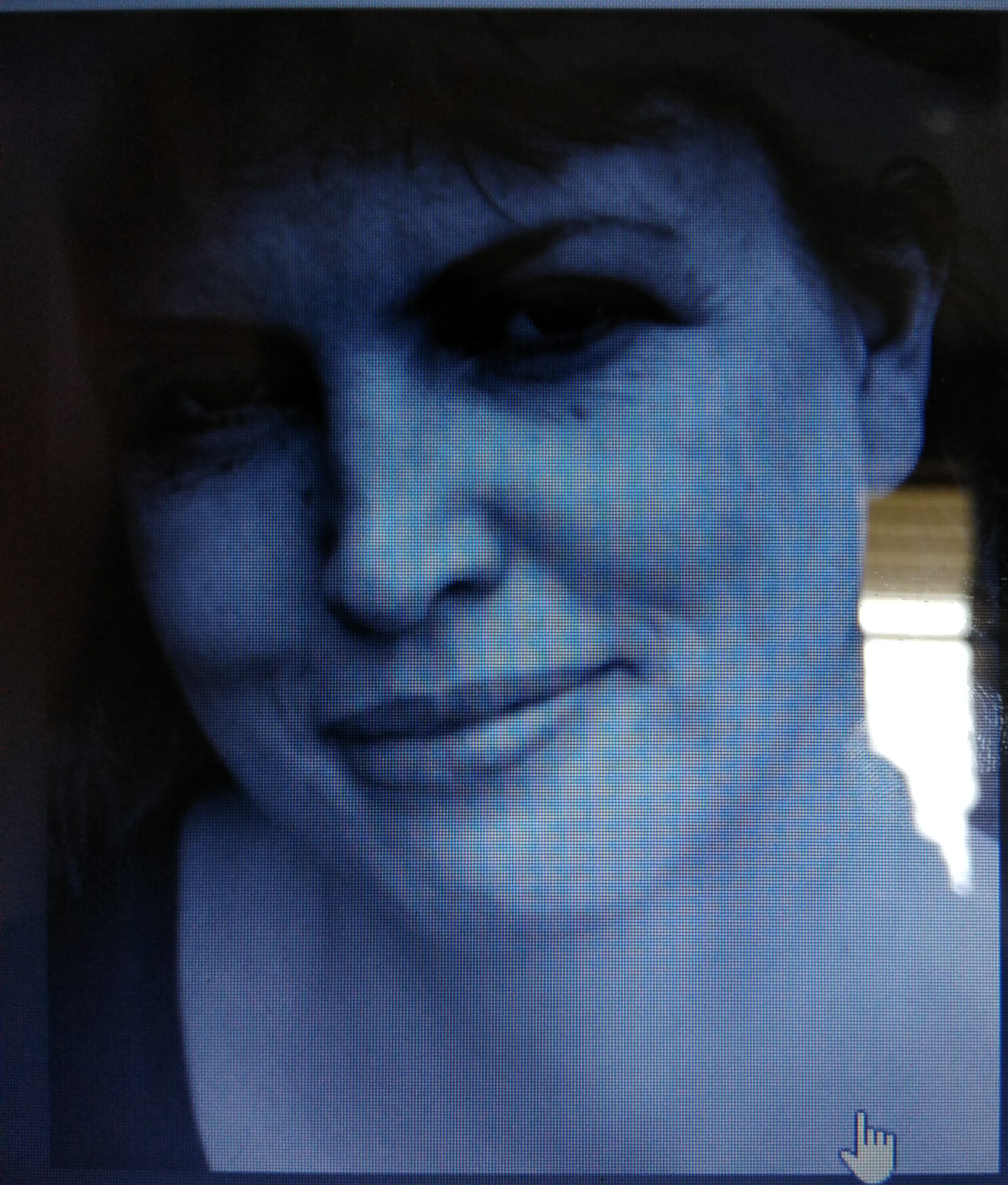
Kathryn Simmonds

Kathryn Simmonds (born 1972) is a British poet and short story writer.

== Life ==
She was born in Hertfordshire and graduated from the University of East Anglia with an MA in Creative Writing.

She has also experimented with playwriting, and her first radio play Poetry for Beginners, a comic drama set on a creative writing residential course, was broadcast on Radio 4 in 2008.

She lives in London, England, and teaches creative writing at the Poetry School and Morley College.

== Awards ==
- 2002 Eric Gregory Award, from the Society of Authors
- 2004 Poetry Business competition
- 2006 Poetry London competition
- 2007 Asham Award shortlisted for "Pentecost"
- 2008 Forward Poetry Prize Best First Collection
- 2008 Guardian First Book Award, longlisted
- 2008 Costa Book Awards, nominated Poetry category

== Works ==
=== Poetry collections ===
- Snug, Smith/Doorstop 2004
- Sunday at the Skin Launderette, Seren 2008
- The Visitations, Seren 2013

=== Novels ===
- Love and Fallout, Seren 2014
