= Wayne Holloway-Smith =

British poet

Wayne Holloway-Smith is a British poet. He was born in Swindon, Wiltshire, and currently lives in London.

Holloway-Smith's first poetry publication was the pamphlet Beloved, in case you've been wondering, published by Donut Press in 2011. His first book-length collection, Alarum (2017), was a Poetry Book Society Wildcard Choice for Winter 2017, and was shortlisted for the Roehampton Poetry Prize 2018 and the Seamus Heaney Centre for Poetry Prize in 2018.

The final poem in the collection – "Short" – won the Geoffrey Dearmer Award in 2016. His second pamphlet, I CAN'T WAIT FOR THE WENDING, was published by Test Centre in 2018. His poem "the posh mums are boxing in the square" won the National Poetry Competition in 2018. His second full-length collection, Love minus Love, was shortlisted for the 2020 T. S. Eliot Prize as well as being a Poetry Book Society Wild Card choice. His pamphlet, Lasagne, was published by Out-Spoken Press in spring 2020.

Holloway-Smith is the current editor of The Poetry Review, the magazine of The Poetry Society.

Holloway-Smith is also a lecturer in Literature and Creative Writing in the School of Humanities at the University of Hertfordshire.
