= A Poet's Polemic =

Poetry book

- Author: John Burnside
- Language: English
- Publication date: 2003
- Publication place: United Kingdom
- Media type: Print

A Poet's Polemic is a 2003 collection of poetry written by Scottish poet John Burnside. It was published as part of National Poetry Day 2003.
