= The Drowned Book =

2007 poetry collection by Sean O'Brien

- Author: Sean O'Brien
- Language: English
- Genre: Poetry
- Publisher: Picador
- Publication date: 17 September 2007^{α} 28 October 2007^{β}
- Publication place: United Kingdom
- Media type: Print, kindle
- Pages: 80 pp.
- ISBN: 9781743033142 (kindle); 9780330447621 (hardcover 1st ed.)

The Drowned Book is a collection of poetry written by Sean O'Brien, a British poet, critic, and novelist. In 2007 it was awarded the Forward Prize for Best Collection (the third time the author has received this award) and the T. S. Eliot Prize in 2007. The book was reprinted in 2015, with an introduction from poet and novelist Helen Dunmore, a new cover, and additional content.

== Themes and subject matter ==
The Drowned Book is a collection of poems based around Dante Alighieri's Inferno, but the author decided to re-write them themed around a darker than usual form of water that is unclean and filled with emotions, and its part in the Northern English history. According to Sarah Crown, the author refers to the Victorian era and how the humans visioned themselves as being in control of the water element using different tools. In the poem "Re-edify me" he holds this thought in high regard. Yet, in "Water Gardens" poem, he talks about how detrimental the era was.

== Critical response ==
Sarah Crown, reviewing the collection for The Guardian, called it a "lyrical and evocative collection."

According to Tim Love, The Drowned Book sold 768 copies before being awarded the T. S. Eliot Prize.

== Awards ==
The Drowned Book was awarded both the T. S. Eliot Prize and Forward Prizes for Poetry in 2007. The T. S. Eliot Prize is the highest award given to poetry written by an Irish or English poet. The Forward Prizes for Poetry is a British award given to works of poetry published in England; this was the third time O'Brien received the award (to his surprise, given the competition). The judges from the Forward Prizes panel said the book is "witty and heart-wrenching."

Year	Award	Category	Result	Ref.
2007	Forward Prizes for Poetry	Collection	Won	
2007	T. S. Eliot Prize	—	Won	

== Notes ==
^{α} The kindle version was released first
^{β} First edition hardcover shortly after
