= Forward Prizes for Poetry =

British poetry award(s)

- Awarded for: Best Collection (£10,000); Best First Collection (£5,000); Best Single Poem (written) (£1,000); Best Single Poem (performed) (£1,000)
- Sponsored by: Forward Worldwide, Arts Council England, The Esmée Fairbairn Foundation, The estate of Felix Dennis
- Date: 1992
- Location: United Kingdom

The Forward Prizes for Poetry are major British awards for poetry, presented annually at a public ceremony in London. They were founded in 1992 by William Sieghart with the aim of celebrating excellence in poetry and increasing its audience. The prizes do this by identifying and honouring talent: collections published in the UK and Ireland over the course of the previous year are eligible, as are single poems nominated by journal editors or prize organisers. Each year, works shortlisted for the prizes – plus those highly commended by the judges – are collected in the Forward Book of Poetry.

The awards have been sponsored since their inception by the content marketing agency Bookmark, formerly Forward Worldwide. The best first collection prize is sponsored by the estate of Felix Dennis.

The Forward Prizes for Poetry celebrated their 30th anniversary in 2021. In 2023, a new category for outstanding performance of a poem was added to the list of awards.

== Awards ==
The Forward Prizes for Poetry consist of four awards:

- The Forward Prize for Best Collection, £10,000
- The Felix Dennis Prize for Best First Collection, £5,000
- The Forward Prize for Best Single Poem (written) in memory of Michael Donaghy, £1,000
- The Forward Prize for Best Single Poem (performed), £1,000

The Prizes are run by the Forward Arts Foundation, which is also responsible for National Poetry Day. The executive director of the Forward Arts Foundation is Susannah Herbert.

== Previous winners ==
=== Best Collection ===
Forward Prizes for Best Poetry Collection
Year	Author	Title	Publisher	Ref.
1992	Thom Gunn	The Man with Night Sweats	Faber and Faber	
1993	Carol Ann Duffy	Mean Time	Anvil Press Poetry	
1994	Alan Jenkins	Harm	Chatto & Windus	
1995	Sean O'Brien	Ghost Train	Oxford University Press	
1996	John Fuller	Stones and Fires	Chatto & Windus	
1997	Jamie McKendrick	The Marble Fly	Oxford University Press	
1998	Ted Hughes	Birthday Letters	Faber and Faber	
1999	Jo Shapcott	My Life Asleep	Oxford University Press	
2000	Michael Donaghy	Conjure	Picador	
2001	Sean O'Brien	Downriver	Picador	
2002	Peter Porter	Max is Missing	Picador	
2003	Ciaran Carson	Breaking News	Gallery Press	
2004	Kathleen Jamie	The Tree House	Picador	
2005	David Harsent	Legion	Faber and Faber	
2006	Robin Robertson	Swithering	Picador	
2007	Sean O'Brien	The Drowned Book	Picador	
2008	Mick Imlah	The Lost Leader	Faber and Faber	
2009	Don Paterson	Rain	Faber and Faber	
2010	Seamus Heaney	Human Chain	Faber and Faber	
2011	John Burnside	Black Cat Bone	Jonathan Cape	
2012	Jorie Graham	PLACE	Carcanet Press	
2013	Michael Symmons Roberts	Drysalter	Cape Poetry	
2014	Kei Miller	The Cartographer Tries to Map a Way to Zion	Carcanet Press	
2015	Claudia Rankine	Citizen: An American Lyric	Penguin Books	
2016	Vahni Capildeo	Measures of Expatriation	Carcanet Press	
2017	Sinéad Morrissey	On Balance	Carcanet Press	
2018	Danez Smith	Don't Call Us Dead	Chatto & Windus	
2019	Fiona Benson	Vertigo and Ghost	Cape Poetry	
2020	Caroline Bird	The Air Year	Carcanet Press	
2021	Luke Kennard	Notes on the Sonnets	Penned in the Margins	
2022	Kim Moore	All the Men I Never Married	Seren Books	
2023	Jason Allen-Paisant	Self-Portrait as Othello	Carcanet Press	
2024	Victoria Chang	With My Back to the World	Corsair	
2025	Vidyan Ravinthiran	Avidyā	Bloodaxe Books	Ravinthiran and Solie were the prize's first joint winners
2025	Karen Solie	Wellwater	Picador	Ravinthiran and Solie were the prize's first joint winners
2026	Sarah Howe	Foretokens	Chatto & Windus	

=== Best First Collection ===
Forward Prizes for Best First Poetry Collection
Year	Author	Title	Publisher	Ref.
1992	Simon Armitage	Kid	Faber and Faber	
1993	Don Paterson	Nil Nil	Faber and Faber	
1994	Kwame Dawes	Progeny of Air	Peepal Tree Press	
1995	Jane Duran	Breathe Now, Breathe	Enitharmon Press	
1996	Alice Oswald	The Thing in the Gap Stone Stile	Faber and Faber	
1997	Robin Robertson	A Painted Field	Picador	
1998	Paul Farley	The Boy from the Chemist is Here to See You	Picador	
1999	Nick Drake	The Man in the White Suit	Bloodaxe Books	
2000	Andrew Waterhouse	In	The Rialto	
2001	John Stammers	The Panoramic Lounge Bar	Picador	
2002	Tom French	Touching the Bones	The Gallery Press	
2003	A. B. Jackson	Fire Stations	Anvil Press Poetry	
2004	Leontia Flynn	These Days	Jonathan Cape	
2005	Helen Farish	Intimates	Jonathan Cape	
2006	Tishani Doshi	Countries of the Body	Aark Arts	
2007	Daljit Nagra	Look We Have Coming to Dover!	Faber and Faber	
2008	Kathryn Simmonds	Sunday at the Skin Launderette	Seren Books	
2009	Emma Jones	The Striped World	Faber and Faber	
2010	Hilary Menos	Berg	Seren Books	
2011	Rachael Boast	Sidereal	Picador	
2012	Sam Riviere	81 Austerities		
2013	Emily Berry	Dear Boy	Faber and Faber	
2014	Liz Berry	Black Country	Chatto & Windus	
2015	Mona Arshi	Small Hands	Liverpool University Press	
2016	Tiphanie Yanique	Wife	Peepal Tree Press	
2017	Ocean Vuong	Night Sky with Exit Wounds	Jonathan Cape	
2018	Phoebe Power	Shrines of Upper Austria	Carcanet Press	
2019	Stephen Sexton	If All the World and Love Were Young	Penguin Books	
2020	Will Harris	RENDANG	Granta	
2021	Caleb Femi	Poor	Penguin Poetry	
2022	Stephanie Sy-Quia	Amnion	Granta	
2023	Momtaza Mehri	Bad Diaspora Poems	Jonathan Cape	
2024	Marjorie Lotfi	The Wrong Person to Ask	Bloodaxe	
2025	Isabelle Baafi	Chaotic Good	Faber and Faber	
2026	Nur Turkmani	October	Hajar Press	

=== Best Single Poem (written) ===
Forward Prizes for Best Single Poem (written)
Year	Author	Title	Publication	Ref.
1992	Jackie Kay	"Black Bottom"		
1993	Vicki Feaver	"Judith"		
1994	Iain Crichton Smith	"Autumn"		
1995	Jenny Joseph	"In Honour of Love"		
1996	Kathleen Jamie	"The Graduates"		
1997	Lavinia Greenlaw	"A World Where News Travelled Slowly"		
1998	Sheenagh Pugh	"Envying Owen Beattie"		
1999	Robert Minhinnick	"Twenty-five Laments for Iraq"		
2000	Tessa Biddington	"The Death of Descartes"		
2001	Ian Duhig	"The Lammas Hireling"		
2002	Medbh McGuckian	"She is in the Past, She has this Grace"	The Shop	
2003	Robert Minhinnick	"The Fox in the National Museum of Wales"	Poetry London	
2004	Daljit Nagra	"Look We Have Coming to Dover!"	Poetry Review	
2005	Paul Farley	"Liverpool Disappears for a Billionth of a Second"	The North	
2006	Sean O'Brien	"Fantasia on a Theme of James Wright"	Poetry Review	
2007	Alice Oswald	"Dunt"	Poetry London	
2008	Don Paterson	"Love Poem for Natalie 'Tusja' Beridze"	Poetry Review	
2009	Robin Robertson	"At Roane Head"		
2010	Julia Copus	"An Easy Passage"		
2011	R. F. Langley	"To a Nightingale"	London Review of Books	
2012	Denise Riley	"A Part Song"		
2013	Nick MacKinnon	"The Metric System"	The Warwick Review	
2014	Stephen Santus	"In a Restaurant"	The Bridport Prize	
2015	Claire Harman	"The Mighty Hudson"	TLS	
2016	Sasha Dugdale	"Joy"	PN Review	
2017	Ian Patterson	"The Plenty of Nothing"	PN Review	
2018	Liz Berry	"The Republic of Motherhood"	Granta	
2019	Parwana Fayyaz	"Forty Names"	PN Review	
2020	Malika Booker	"The Little Miracles"	Magma	
2021	Nicole Sealey	"Pages 22–29" an excerpt from The Ferguson Report: An Erasure	Poetry London	
2022	Nick Laird	"Up Late"	Granta	
2023	Malika Booker	"Libation"	Poetry Review	
2024	Cindy Juyoung Ok	"Ward of One"	Poetry London	
2025	Abeer Ameer	"At Least"	MODRON Magazine	
2026	Tara Bergin	"The Fear"	The Stinging Fly	

=== Best Single Poem (performed) ===
Forward Prizes for Best Single Poem (performed)
Year	Author	Title	Ref.
2023	Bohdan Piasecki	'Almost Certainly'	
2024	Leyla Josephine	'Dear John Berger'	
2025	Griot Gabriel	'Where I'm From'	
2026	Biff Smith	'Dumbarton East'	

== See also ==
- List of literary awards
- List of British literary awards
- English poetry
- List of poetry awards
- List of years in poetry
- List of years in literature
