= Landing Light (book) =

Don Paterson's third book of poems (2003)

- Author: Don Paterson
- Language: English
- Genre: Poetry
- Published: 27 June 2006
- Publisher: Graywolf Press
- Pages: 88 pp
- Awards: T. S. Eliot Prize (2003); Whitbread Poetry Award (2003)
- ISBN: 978-1555974473

Landing Light is Scottish author Don Paterson's third collection of poems. After its publication in 2003 by Faber & Faber, it was awarded both the Whitbread Poetry Award and the T. S. Eliot Prize.

== Background ==
In Landing Light, Don Paterson dedicates poems such as "The Thread" and "Walking with Russell" to his sons, Russell and Jamie. Within these poems, he shares his admiration for their eagerness to live and portrays parenthood as his rescue from hopelessness. He also dedicates a poem to his newly-wed friends.

== Contents ==
Landing Light is an 88 page book consisting of 38 free verse poems that range from 1 paragraph to 10 pages in length (i.e. "The Alexandrian Library, Part III"). The book contains multi-sectional narratives that turn memento mori and are painted with dark humor. In some of the poems, Paterson expresses appreciation for simple, yet meaningful moments in his life whilst struggling with his feelings and identity. For example, in "The Wreck" Paterson provides an affectionate and honest reflection of an intense breakup he had experienced before: "But what lovers we were, what lovers / even when it was all over- / the deadweight, bull-black wines we swung / toward each other rang and rang // like bells of blood, our own great hearts." Another example is "My Love", a poem explaining that lovers do not actually love one another, they only love the feeling of loving each other. He continues the poem to introspectively justify the idea with a trail of analyzations.

== Themes ==
Sarah Crown has stated that whether physically, emotionally, or spiritually, each poem in Landing Light illustrates forms of death. The "light" in the title is an indication of the possibility of redemption, even in times of darkness. According to Matthew Reynolds, "The Landing", one of two poems related to the title of the book, positions the protagonist in between the 'complex upper light' and 'the darker flight / that fell back to the dead'. The protagonist is in search for someone/something only to find that the quarry is himself.

== Awards ==
| Year | Award | Category | Result | Ref |
|---|---|---|---|---|
| 2003 | T. S. Eliot Prize | — | Won | |
| 2003 | Whitbread Award | Poetry | Won | |
