= Emily Berry =

English poet and writer (born 1981)

Emily Berry FRSL
- Born: 1981 (age 44–45); London, England
- Education: University of Leeds (MA); Goldsmiths College (MA); University of East Anglia (PhD)
- Occupations: Poet and writer
- Writing career
- Notable works: Dear Boy (2013); Stranger Baby (2017); Unexhausted Time (2022)
- Notable awards: Hawthornden Prize; Forward Prize for Best First Collection

Emily Berry FRSL (born 1981) is an English poet and writer.

== Early life ==
Born and raised in London, Emily Berry studied English literature at Leeds University, and Creative and Life Writing at Goldsmiths College. She has a PhD in Creative and Critical Writing from the University of East Anglia.

== Career ==
She was one of five to be awarded an Eric Gregory Award in 2008. Her pamphlet Stingray Fevers was published by tall-lighthouse in 2008. Her debut collection of poems, Dear Boy (2013), won the Hawthornden Prize and the Forward Prize for Best First Collection. Her second collection, entitled Stranger, Baby, was published by Faber & Faber in 2017. Her third collection, Unexhausted Time, was published by Faber & Faber in 2022.

She is a contributor to collections and anthologies such as The Breakfast Bible (Bloomsbury, 2013).

From 2017 until 2022, Berry was the editor of The Poetry Review, the UK's most widely read poetry magazine, having succeeded Maurice Riondan in the role.

In June 2018, Berry was elected Fellow of the Royal Society of Literature (FRSL) in its "40 Under 40" initiative.

== Awards ==
Year	Book	Award	Category	Result	Ref
2008	—	Eric Gregory Award	—	Won	
2014	Dear Boy	Forward Prize	First Collection	Won	
2014	Dear Boy	Hawthornden Prize	—	Won	
2015	Dear Boy	Michael Murphy Memorial Poetry Prize	—	Shortlisted	

== Biblio ==
- —— (2013). Dear Boy. Faber & Faber.
- —— (2017). Stranger, Baby. Faber & Faber.
- —— (2022). Unexhausted Time. Faber & Faber.
