= Vicki Feaver =

English poet (born 1943)

- Feaver in 2020
- Born: 1943 (age 82–83); Nottingham, England
- Education: Durham University; University College, London
- Occupation: Poet
- Spouse: )
- Writing career
- Notable work: The Handless Maiden
- Notable awards: Forward Prizes for Poetry, Best Single Poem, for "Judith"; National Poetry Competition for the poem "Bats"

Vicki Feaver (born 1943) is an English poet. She has published three poetry collections. Feaver's poem "Judith", from her book, Handless Maiden, was awarded the Forward Prize for Best Single Poem. The book was also the recipient of a Heinemann Prize and shortlisted for the Forward Prize. Feaver was also a recipient of a Cholmondeley Award.

== Biography ==
Feaver was born in 1943 in Nottingham, England. She studied music at Durham University and English at University College, London, and later worked as a lecturer and tutor in English and Creative Writing at University College, Chichester, where she is an emeritus professor.

On 14 January 2014, Feaver participated in the BBC Radio 3 series "The Essay - Letters to a Young Poet". Taking Rainer Maria Rilke's classic text Letters to a Young Poet as inspiration, leading poets wrote a letter to a protégé.

Feaver lives in South Lanarkshire, Scotland.

== Collections of poetry ==
- 1978: Monograph (Pamela Robertson-Pearce)
- 1981: Close Relatives (Secker & Warburg)
- 1986: Clean Sheets (Cathcart Press)
- 1991: Penguin Modern Poets Vol. 2 (with Carol Ann Duffy and Eavan Boland)
- 1992: Crab Apple Jelly (Somers Press)
- 1994: The Handless Maiden (Jonathan Cape, shortlisted for Forward Prize)
- 2003: Girl in Red and Other Poems (Scottish Book Trust)
- 2006: The Book of Blood (Jonathan Cape, shortlisted for Forward Prize and Costa Award)
- 2015: Second Wind (Saltire Society, with Douglas Dunn and Diana Henry)
- 2019: I Want! I Want! (Jonathan Cape, forthcoming autumn 2019)

== Other works ==
- 2005: Machinery of Grace: A Tribute to Michael Donaghy (1954–2004) (contributor)
- 2011: This Moment Will Never Come Again: A Selection of Daily Photographs from the Attic Salt Exhibition (co-author)

== Prizes ==
- 1992: Arvon Competition Prize for the poem "Lily Pond"
- 1993: Forward Poetry Prize, Best Single Poem, for the poem "Judith"
- 1994: W. H. Heinemann Award for The Handless Maiden
- 1998: National Poetry Competition for the poem "Bats"
- 1999: Cholmondeley Award
