= National Poetry Competition =

Annual British poetry competition

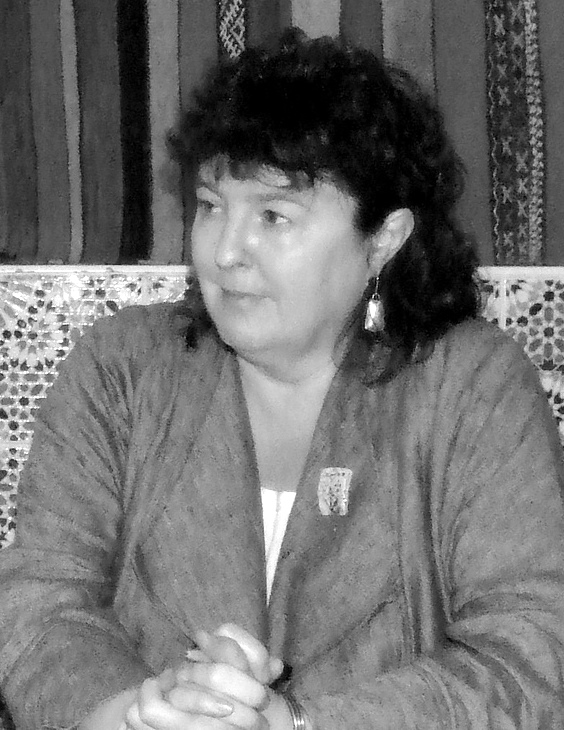
Carol Ann Duffy, the UK poet laureate, winner in 1983

The National Poetry Competition is an annual poetry prize established in 1978 in the United Kingdom. It is run by UK-based The Poetry Society and accepts entries from all over the world, with over 10,000 poems being submitted to the competition each year. Winning has been an important milestone in the careers of many well-known poets.

Carol Ann Duffy, the UK Poet Laureate from 2009 to 2019, won in 1983 with "Whoever She Was". Looking back, in 2007 she commented: "in those days, one was still called a 'poetess' – so it meant a lot, as a young woman poet, to begin to try to change that". Christopher James, the 2008 winner, commented "if there is an unspoken Grand Slam circuit for poetry prizes, then the National Poetry Competition is definitely Wimbledon – it's the one everyone dreams of winning". Other prestigious names to have won the competition include Ruth Padel, Jo Shapcott, Sinéad Morrissey, Ian Duhig, Colette Bryce and the poet and novelist Helen Dunmore.

Melanie Drane was the first non-British to win, in 2005.

The competition runs annually, opening in the spring and closing at the end of October. A new team of judges (made up of three respected poets) is announced each year. The first prize is £5,000 and the top three winners are published in Britain's leading poetry magazine, The Poetry Review.

== Winners ==
Year	Author	Title	Ref
1978	Michael Hulse	"Dole Queue"	
1979	Medbh McGuckian	"The Flitting"	
1980	Tony Harrison	"Timer"	
1981	James Berry	"Fantasy of an African Boy"	
1982	Philip Gross	"The Ice Factory"	
1983	Carol Ann Duffy	"Whoever She Was"	
1984	Tony Curtis	"The Death of Richard Beattie-Seaman in Belgian Grand Prix, 1939"	
1985	Jo Shapcott	"The Surrealists' Summer Convention Came to Our City"	
1986	Carole Satyamurti	"Between the Lines"	
1987	Ian Duhig	"Nineteen Hundred and Nineteen"	
1988	Martin Reed	"The Widow's Dream"	
1989	William Scammell	"A World Elsewhere"	
1990	Nicky Rice	"Room Service"	
1991	Jo Shapcott	"Phrase Book"	
1991	John Levett	"A Shrunken Head"	
1992	Stephen Knight	"The Mermaid Tank"	
1993	Sam Gardiner	"Protestant Windows"	
1994	David Hart	"The Silkies"	
1995	James Harpur	"The Frame of Furnace Light"	
1996	Ruth Padel	"Icicles Round a Tree in Dumfriesshire"	
1997	Neil Rollinson	"Constellations"	
1998	Caroline Carver	"horse underwater"	
1999	Simon Rae	"Believed"	
2000	Ian Duhig	"The Lammas Hireling"	
2001	Beatrice Garland	"undressing"	
2002	Julia Copus	"Breaking the Rule"	
2003	Colette Bryce	"The Full Indian Rope Trick"	
2004	Jon Sait	"Homeland"	
2005	Melanie Drane	"The Year the Rice-Crop Failed"	
2006	Mike Barlow	"The Third Wife"	
2007	Sinéad Morrissey	"Through the Square Window"	
2008	Christopher James	"Farewell to the Earth"	
2009	Helen Dunmore	"The Malarkey"	
2010	Paul Adrian	"Robin in Flight"	
2011	Allison McVety	"To the Lighthouse"	
2012	Patricia McCarthy	"Clothes That Escaped the Great War"	
2013	Linda France	"Bernard and Cerinthe"	
2014	Roger Philip Dennis	"Corkscrew Hill Photo"	
2015	Eric Berlin	"Night Errand"	
2016	Stephen Sexton	"The Curfew"	
2017	Dom Bury	"The Opened Field"	
2018	Wayne Holloway-Smith	"The posh mums are boxing in the square"	
2019	Susannah Hart	"Reading the Safeguarding and Child Protection Policy"	
2020	Marvin Thompson	"The Fruit of the Spirit Is Love (Galatians 5:22)"	
2021	Eric Yip	"Fricatives"	
2022	Lee Stockdale	"My Dead Father's General Store in the Middle of a Desert"	
2023	Imogen Wade	"The Time I Was Mugged in New York City"	
2024	Fiona Larkin	"Absence has a grammar"	
