= Clare Best =

British poet, author and university lecturer

Clare Best is a British poet, author and university lecturer who was both shortlisted for the 2012 Seamus Heaney Centre Prize for "Excisions" and a finalist for the 2014 Mslexia Memoir Competition for "The Missing List".

== Bibliography ==
- Treasure Ground (HappenStance Press, 2010)
- Excisions (Waterloo Press, 2011)
- Breastless (Pighog, 2011)
- Cell (Frogmore Press, 2015)
- Springlines (Little Toller Books, 2017)
- The Missing List — a memoir (Linen Press, 2018)
- Each Other (Waterloo Press, 2019)
- End of Season / Fine di stagione (Frogmore Press, 2022)
- Beyond the Gate (Worple Press, 2023)

== Award nominations ==
- Seamus Heaney Centre Prize (2012)
- Mslexia Memoir Competition (2014)

== See also ==
- Official website
