= Harry Guest =

British poet (1932–2021)

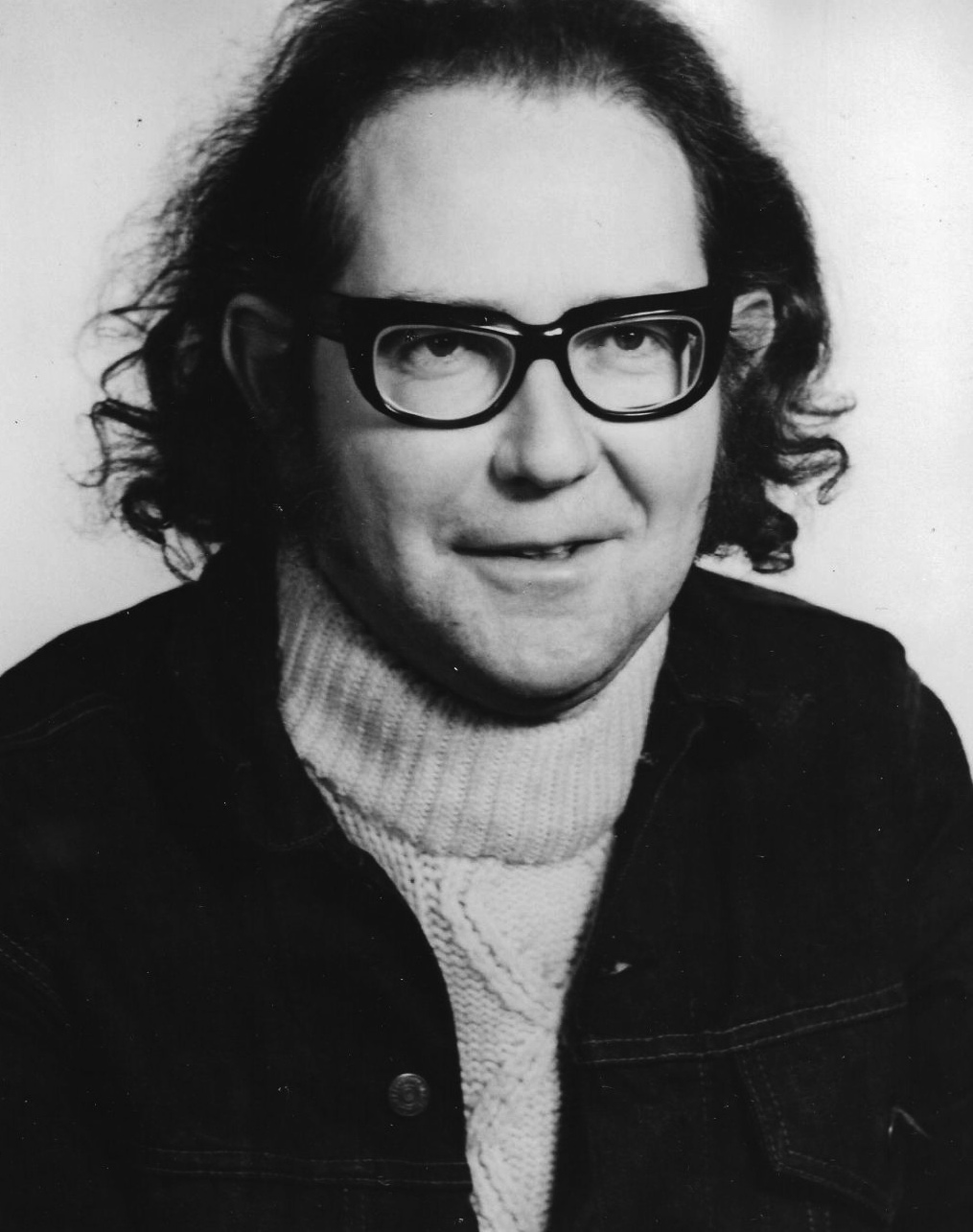
Harry Guest, Exeter, 1973

Harry Guest (born Henry Bayly Guest; 6 October 1932 – 20 March 2021) was a British poet born in Wales.

== Life and career ==
Harry Guest was educated at Malvern College and read Modern Languages at Trinity Hall, Cambridge. He wrote a thesis on Mallarmé at the Sorbonne. At Trinity Hall he co-edited the poetry magazine Chequer, which continued for eleven issues and published poems by Thom Gunn, Anne Stevenson, Ted Hughes, and Sylvia Plath, though there is no evidence to suggest he met Plath or Hughes. From 1955-66, he taught at Felsted School and Lancing College, and then moved to Japan, becoming a lecturer in English at Yokohama National University. He returned to England in 1972 and was Head of French at Exeter School until his retirement in 1991. A selection of his poetry was included in Penguin Modern Poets 16. He was an Honorary Research Fellow at the University of Exeter and was awarded an honorary doctorate (LittD) by Plymouth University in 1998. Apart from his many collections of poetry, he is well known as a translator from the French and Japanese, and has published several novels and non-fiction books including the Traveller's Literary Companion to Japan (1994) and The Artist on the Artist (2000). His translations include a selected poems of Victor Hugo, The Distance, The Shadows (2002) and Post-War Japanese Poetry (with Lynn Guest and Kajima Shôzô, 1972). He lived in Exeter, and was married to the historical novelist Lynn Guest, they have two children.

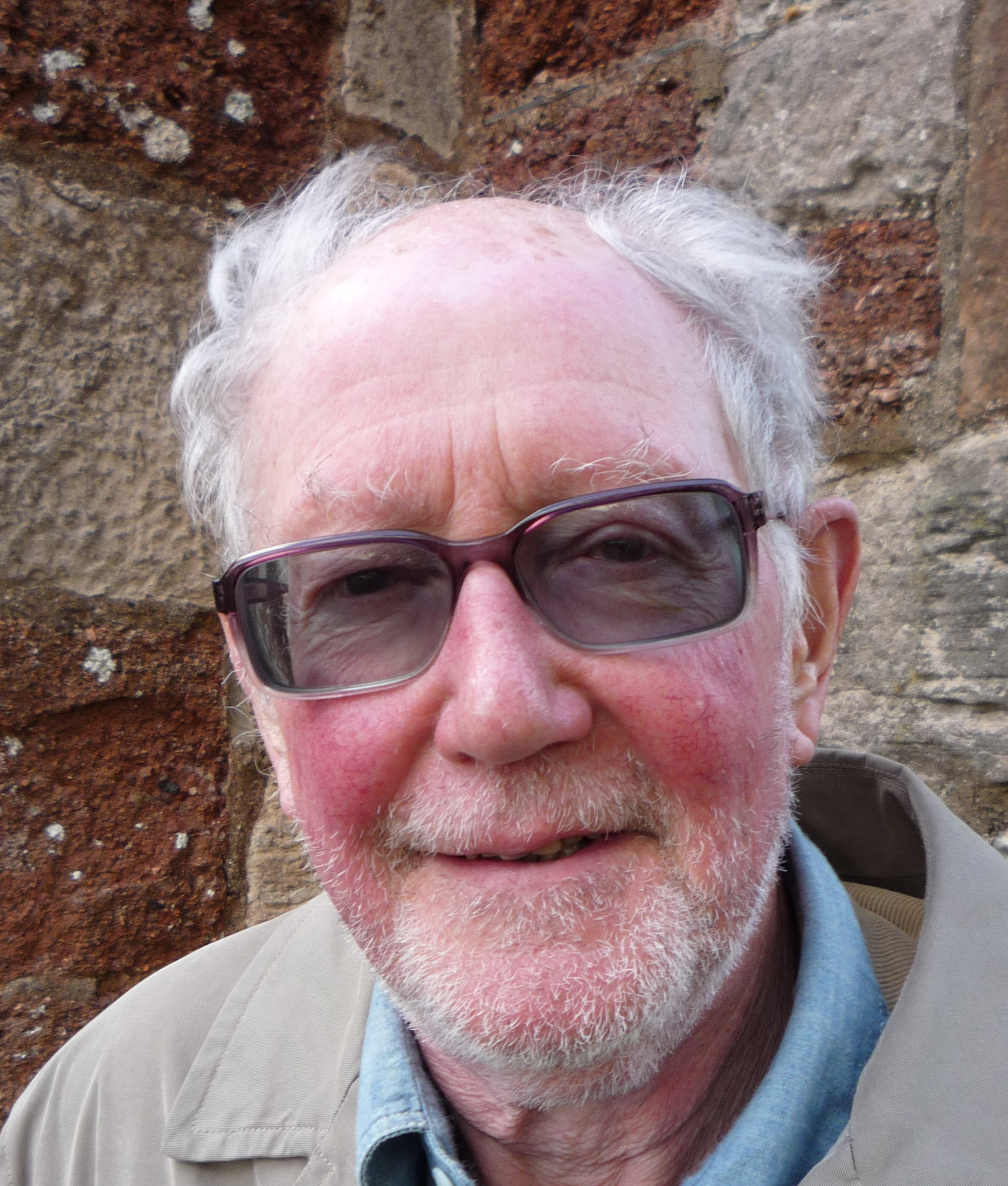
Harry Guest in Topsham, 2011

== Works ==
- A Different Darkness, London: Outposts, 1964
- Arrangements, Northwood, UK: Anvil, 1968
- The Cutting-Room, London: Anvil, 1970
- The Place, Northamptonshire, UK: Sceptre, 1971
- Mountain Journal, Sheffield, UK: Rivelin, 1975
- A House Against the Night, London: Anvil, 1976
- English Poems, London: Words, 1976
- Days, London: Anvil, 1978
- Elegies, Durham, UK: Pig, 1980
- Lost and Found, London: Anvil, 1983
- The Emperor of Outer Space, Durham, UK: Pig, 1983
- Lost Pictures, Exeter, UK: Albertine, 1991
- Coming to Terms, London: Anvil, 1994
- So Far, Exeter, UK: Stride, 1998
- Versions, Nether Stowey, UK: Odyssey, 1999
- A Puzzling Harvest, Collected Poems 1955-2000, London: Anvil, 2002
- Time After Time, Exeter, UK: Albertine, 2005
- Comparisons & Conversions, ISBN 978-1848610194 Exeter, UK: Shearsman, 2009
- Some Times, London: Anvil, 2010
