= John Burnside =

Scottish writer (1955–2024)

John Burnside FRSL FRSE
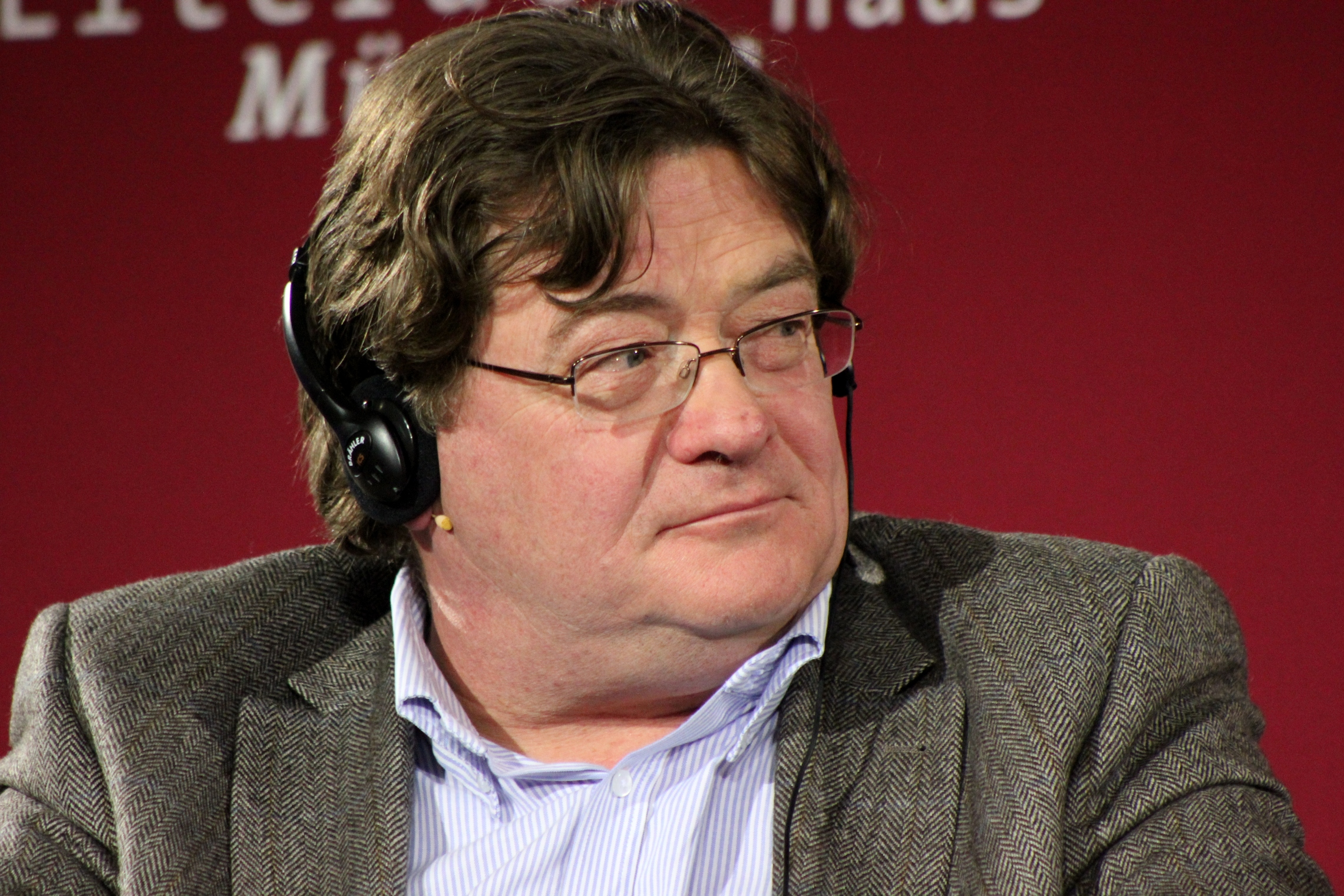
- Burnside in 2012
- Born: 19 March 1955; Dunfermline, Scotland
- Died: 29 May 2024 (aged 69)
- Education: Cambridge College of Arts and Technology
- Occupation: Writer
- Notable work: The Hoop; Common Knowledge; A Lie About My Father; Black Cat Bone
- Awards: T. S. Eliot Prize; Forward Poetry Prize; David Cohen Prize Scottish Arts Council Book Award; Whitbread Book Award; Geoffrey Faber Memorial Prize; Saltire Scottish Book of the Year; Cholmondeley Award; Sundial Scottish Arts Council Book Awards; Corine Literature Prize

John Burnside FRSL FRSE (19 March 1955 – 29 May 2024) was a Scottish writer. He was one of four poets (with Ted Hughes, Sean O'Brien and Jason Allen-Paisant) to have won the T. S. Eliot Prize and the Forward Poetry Prize for a single book – in this case, for Black Cat Bone in 2011. In 2023, he won the David Cohen Prize in recognition of his full body of work.

== Life and works ==
Burnside was born in Dunfermline, Scotland, and raised in Cowdenbeath and Corby. He studied English and European Thought and Literature at Cambridge College of Arts and Technology. A former computer software engineer, he was a freelance writer after 1996. He was a former Writer in Residence at the University of Dundee and was Professor in Creative Writing at the University of St Andrews, where he taught creative writing, literature and ecology and American poetry.

His first collection of poetry, The Hoop, was published in 1988 and won a Scottish Arts Council Book Award. Other poetry collections by Burnside include Common Knowledge (1991), Feast Days (1992), winner of the Geoffrey Faber Memorial Prize, and The Asylum Dance (2000), winner of the Whitbread Poetry Award and shortlisted for both the Forward Poetry Prize (Best Poetry Collection of the Year) and the T. S. Eliot Prize. The Light Trap (2001) was also shortlisted for the T. S. Eliot Prize.

Burnside was also the author of two collections of short stories, Burning Elvis (2000), and Something Like Happy (2013), as well as several novels, including The Dumb House (1997), The Devil's Footprints, (2007), Glister, (2009) and A Summer of Drowning, (2011). His multi-award winning memoir, A Lie About My Father, was published in 2006 and its successor, Waking up in Toytown, in 2010. A Lie About My Father earned him the Saltire Scottish Book of the Year in 2006, alongside the Sundial Scottish Arts Council Non-fiction Book of the Year and the CORINE International Literature Prize. In 2008 he won the Cholmondeley Award. A further memoir, I Put A Spell On You, combined personal history with reflections on romantic love, magic and popular music. His short stories and feature essays have appeared in numerous magazines and journals, including The New Yorker, The Guardian and The London Review of Books, among others. He also wrote an occasional nature column for the New Statesman. In 2011 he received the Petrarca-Preis, a major German international literary prize.

Burnside's work was inspired by his engagement with nature, environment and deep ecology. His collection of short stories, Something Like Happy, was published in 2013.

Burnside was a Fellow of the Royal Society of Literature (elected in 1999) and in March 2016 was elected a Fellow of the Royal Society of Edinburgh, Scotland's National Academy for science and letters.

He also lectured annually and oversaw the judging of the writing prize at the Alpine Fellowship.

Burnside died after a short illness on 29 May 2024, at the age of 69.

== Awards ==
- 1988: Scottish Arts Council Book Award, for The Hoop
- 1991: Scottish Arts Council Book Award, for Common Knowledge
- 1994: Geoffrey Faber Memorial Prize, for Feast Days
- 1999: Encore Award for The Mercy Boys
- 2000: Forward Poetry Prize (Best Collection – shortlist), for The Asylum Dance
- 2000: T. S. Eliot Prize (shortlist), for The Asylum Dance
- 2000: Whitbread Book Award, Poetry Award, for The Asylum Dance
- 2002: Saltire Society Scottish Book of the Year Award (shortlist), for The Light Trap
- 2002: T. S. Eliot Prize (shortlist), for The Light Trap
- 2005: Forward Poetry Prize (Best Collection – shortlist), for The Good Neighbour
- 2006: Saltire Society Scottish Book of the Year Award for A Lie About My Father
- 2008: Cholmondeley Award
- 2011: Petrarca-Preis
- 2011: Forward Prize for Black Cat Bone
- 2011: T. S. Eliot Prize for Black Cat Bone
- 2011: Corine Literature Prize for A Lie About My Father
- 2011: Costa Book AwardsNovel, shortlist, A Summer of Drowning
- 2011: PEN/Ackerley Prize (shortlist) for Waking Up in Toytown
- 2012: Spycher: Literaturpreis Leuk with Judith Schalansky
- 2013: Saltire Society Scottish Book of the Year Award for Something Like Happy
- 2017: Hörspiel des Jahres für Coldhaven, translation. composition and directing: Klaus Buhlert (SWR)
- 2018: Hörspielpreis der Kriegsblinden für Coldhaven. translation. composition and directing: Klaus Buhlert (SWR)
- 2022: Michael Marks Awards for Poetry Pamphlets for Apostasy
- 2023: David Cohen Prize

== Bibliography ==
=== Poetry collections ===
- The Hoop (Carcanet, 1988)
- Common Knowledge (Secker and Warburg, London, 1991)
- Feast Days (Secker and Warburg, London, 1992)
- The Myth of the Twin (Jonathan Cape, London, 1994)
- Swimming in the Flood (Jonathan Cape, London, 1995)
- Penguin Modern Poets (Penguin, 1996)
- A Normal Skin (Jonathan Cape, London, 1997)
- The Asylum Dance (Jonathan Cape, London, 2000)
- The Light Trap (Jonathan Cape, London, 2002)
- A Poet's Polemic (2003)
- The Good Neighbour (Jonathan Cape, 2005)
- Selected Poems (Jonathan Cape, 2006)
- Gift Songs (Jonathan Cape, 2007)
- The Hunt in the Forest (Jonathan Cape, 2009)
- Black Cat Bone (Jonathan Cape, 2011)
- All One Breath (Jonathan Cape, 2014)
- Still Life with Feeding Snake (Jonathan Cape, 2017)
- In the Name of the Bee/Im Namen der Biene (Golden Luft, Mainz 2018)
- Learning to Sleep (Jonathan Cape, 2021)
- Apostasy (Dare-Gale Press, 2022)
- Apostasy/Apostasie (Golden Luft, Mainz 2023)
- Ruin, Blossom (Vintage Publishing, Jonathan Cape, 2024)
- The Empire of Forgetting (Jonathan Cape, 2025)

=== Fiction ===
- The Dumb House (Jonathan Cape, London, 1997)
- The Mercy Boys (Jonathan Cape, London, 1999)
- Burning Elvis (Jonathan Cape, London, 2000)
- The Locust Room (Jonathan Cape, London, 2001)
- Living Nowhere (Jonathan Cape, London, 2003)
- The Devil's Footprints (Jonathan Cape, 2007)
- Glister (Jonathan Cape, 2008)
- A Summer of Drowning (Jonathan Cape, 2011)
- Something Like Happy (Jonathan Cape, 2013)
- Ashland & Vine (Jonathan Cape, 2017)
- Havergey (Little Toller, 2017)

=== Non-fiction ===
- Wild Reckoning (Gulbenkian, 2004), joint editor with Maurice Riordan of this anthology of ecology-related poems
- A Lie About My Father (biography, 2006)
- Wallace Stevens : poems / selected by John Burnside (Poet to Poet Series, Faber and Faber, 2008)
- Waking up in Toytown (biography, Jonathan Cape, 2010)
- I Put a Spell on You (biography, Jonathan Cape, 2014)
- On Henry Miller. Princeton University Press. 2018. ISBN 978-0-691-16687-2.
- The Music of Time: Poetry in the Twentieth Century (literary criticism, 2019)
- Aurochs and Auks: Essays on mortality and extinction (Little Toller Books, 2021)

=== Screen ===
- Dice (with A. L. Kennedy), a series for television, produced by Cité-Amérique, Canada

== Critical studies ==
- John Burnside: Contemporary Critical Perspectives (London and New York: Bloomsbury, 2020).
- "Dwelling Places: An Appreciation of John Burnside", special edition of Agenda magazine, Vol. 45, No 4/Vol. 46, No 1, Spring/Summer 2011
