= Sam Riviere =

English poet, author and publisher

- Born: 1981 (age 44–45)
- Education: University of East Anglia
- Occupations: Poet, author
- Writing career
- Language: English
- Notable awards: Eric Gregory Award (2009)

Sam Riviere (born 1981) is an English poet, author and publisher.

== Education and career ==
Riviere was educated at Norwich School of Art and Design and completed a PhD in Creative Writing at the University of East Anglia in 2013. While at art school, Riviere played drums in indie band Le Tetsuo.

He won an Eric Gregory Award in 2009, and the Forward Prize for Best First Collection in 2012 for 81 Austerities.

Since 2015 he has run the independent press If a Leaf Falls Press in Edinburgh, which "publishes limited-edition pamphlets, typically of appropriated or procedural writing".

In 2021, Riviere published his first novel, Dead Souls, to critical acclaim from NPR, The Guardian, The New York Times, and The Washington Post.

== Awards ==
- 2009 Eric Gregory Award
- 2012 Forward Prize for Best First Collection

== Bibliography ==
=== Poetry ===
Pamphlets

- Faber New Poets 7 (Faber & Faber, 2010)
- Standard Twin Fantasy (Egg Box Publishing, 2014)
- Cont. (If a Leaf Falls Press, 2015)
- Preferences (If a Leaf Falls Press, 2016)
- True Colours (After Hours, 2016)
- Darken PDF (Spam Press, 2018)
- Old Poem (A6 Books, 2019)
- Pink Dogs (AFV Press, 2020)
- True Poem, Dead PDF (TEXSTPress, 2022)
- A True Account of Talking to Du Fu at Vesuvio's (2023)

Books

- 81 Austerities (Faber & Faber, 2012)
- Kim Kardashian's Marriage (Faber & Faber, 2015)
- Safe Mode (Test Centre, 2017)
- After Fame (Faber & Faber, 2020)
- Conflicted Copy (Faber & Faber, 2024)
- Mirrors for Princes (After Hours, 2025)

=== Fiction ===
- Dead Souls (Weidenfeld & Nicolson, 2021)
