= Sean O'Brien (writer) =

British poet, critic and playwright (born 1952)

Sean O'Brien FRSL
- Born: 19 December 1952 (age 73); London, England
- Education: Hymers College; Selwyn College, Cambridge
- Writing career
- Genres: Poet, critic, playwright
- Notable work: The Drowned Book (2007)
- Notable awards: Eric Gregory Award (1979); Somerset Maugham Award (1984); Cholmondeley Award (1988); Forward Poetry Prize (1995, 2001 and 2007); T. S. Eliot Prize (2007)

Sean O'Brien FRSL (born 19 December 1952) is a British poet, critic and playwright. Prizes he has won include the Eric Gregory Award (1979), the Somerset Maugham Award (1984), the Cholmondeley Award (1988), the Forward Poetry Prize (1995, 2001 and 2007) and the T. S. Eliot Prize (2007). The Drowned Book received both the T. S. Eliot Prize and the Forward Poetry Prize, an achievement also held by Ted Hughes, John Burnside and Jason Allen-Paisant.

Born in London, England, O'Brien grew up in Hull, and was educated at Hymers College and Selwyn College, Cambridge. He has lived since 1990 in Newcastle upon Tyne, where he teaches at the university. He was the Weidenfeld Visiting Professor at St Anne's College, Oxford, for 2016–17.

== Career ==
O'Brien's book of essays on contemporary poetry, The Deregulated Muse (Bloodaxe), was published in 1998, as was his anthology The Firebox: Poetry in Britain and Ireland after 1945 (Picador). Cousin Coat: Selected Poems 1976–2001 (Picador) was published in 2002. His new verse version of Dante's Inferno was published by Picador in October 2006. O'Brien's six collections of poetry to date have all won awards. In 2007, he won the Northern Rock Foundation Writer's Award, Forward Prize for Best Collection and the T. S. Eliot Prize for The Drowned Book (Picador, 2007). This was the second time a poet had been awarded the Forward and the Eliot prizes in the same year.

In 2006, he was appointed Professor of Creative Writing at Newcastle University, and was previously Professor of Poetry at Sheffield Hallam University. He is Vice-President of the Poetry Society. He was co-founder of the literary magazine The Printer's Devil, contributes reviews to newspapers and magazines including The Sunday Times and The Times Literary Supplement and is a regular broadcaster on radio. His writing for television includes "Cousin Coat", a poem-film in Wordworks (Tyne Tees Television, 1991); "Cantona", a poem-film in On the Line (BBC2, 1994); Strong Language, a 45-minute poem-film (Channel 4, 1997) and The Poet Who Left the Page, a profile of Simon Armitage (BBC4, 2002). Other significant work includes a radio adaptation for BBC Radio 4 of We by Yevgeny Zamyatin.

O'Brien was elected a Fellow of the Royal Society of Literature in 2007.

== Awards and honours ==
- 1979 – Eric Gregory Award
- 1984 – Somerset Maugham Award – The Indoor Park
- 1988 – Cholmondeley Award
- 1992 – Northern Arts Literary Fellowship
- 1993 – E. M. Forster Award
- 1995 – Forward Poetry Prize (Best Poetry Collection of the Year) – Ghost Train
- 2001 – Forward Poetry Prize (Best Poetry Collection of the Year) – Downriver
- 2001 – Northern Writer of the Year Award
- 2001 – T. S. Eliot Prize (shortlist) – Downriver
- 2006 – Forward Poetry Prize (Best Single Poem for Fantasia on a Theme of James Wright)
- 2007 – Northern Rock Foundation Writer's Award
- 2007 – Forward Poetry Prize (Best Collection) – The Drowned Book
- 2007 – T. S. Eliot Prize – The Drowned Book
- 2007 – Royal Society of Literature fellowship
- 2012 – Griffin Poetry Prize International shortlist – November

== Bibliography ==
=== Poetry ===
Collections

- 1983: The Indoor Park (Bloodaxe)
- 1987: The Frighteners (Bloodaxe)
- 1989: Boundary Beach (Ulsterman Publications)
- 1991: HMS Glasshouse (Oxford University Press)
- 1993: A Rarity (Carnivorous Arpeggio)
- 1995: Ghost Train (Oxford University Press)
- 1995: Penguin Modern Poets 5 (with Simon Armitage and Tony Harrison) (Penguin)
- 1997: The Ideology (Smith/Doorstep)
- 2001: Downriver (Picador)
- 2002: Cousin Coat: Selected Poems 1976–2001 (Picador)
- 2002: Rivers (with John Kinsella and Peter Porter) (Fremantle Arts Centre Press, Australia)
- 2006: Inferno: a verse version of Dante's Inferno (Picador)
- 2007: The Drowned Book (Picador)
- 2009: Night Train (with artist Birtley Aris) (Flambard Press)
- 2011: November (Picador)
- 2015: The Beautiful Librarians (Picador)
- 2018: Europa (Picador)
- 2019: Contributor to A New Divan, A Lyrical Dialogue between East and West, Gingko Library, ISBN 9781909942554
- 2020: It Says Here (Picador)
- 2022: Embark (Picador)

Anthologies (edited)

- 1998: The Firebox: Poetry in Britain and Ireland after 1945 (editor) (Picador)
- 2008: Andrew Marvell: poems selected by Sean O'Brien (Poet to Poet series, Faber and Faber)

List of poems

Title	Year	First published	Reprinted/collected
Café de L’Imprimerie	2014	O'Brien, Sean (12 May 2014). "Café de L'Imprimerie". The New Yorker. Vol. 90, no. 12. p. 35.	
In Translation	2022	Butcher's Dog poetry magazine, issue 16.	

=== Plays ===
- 2000: Laughter When We're Dead
- 2001: My Last Barmaid
- 2001: Downriver, cowritten with Keith Morris
- 2002: The Birds: a new verse version of Aristophanes' Birds (Methuen)
- 2003: Keepers of the Flame (Methuen)
- 2003: Live Theatre: Six Plays from the North East (with Cecil Taylor, Tom Hadaway, Alan Plater, Lee Hall, Julia Darling) (Methuen)

=== Novels ===
- 2008: Afterlife (Picador)
- 2016: Once Again Assembled Here (Picador)

=== Short fiction ===
Collections

- 2005: Ellipsis 1: Short Stories by Sean O'Brien, Jean Sprackland and Tim Cooke (Comma Press, ISBN 095482802X)
- 2005: Phantoms at the Phil (with Chaz Brenchley and Gail-Nina Anderson) (Side Real/Northern Gothic, ISBN 0-9542953-1-5)
- 2006: Phantoms at the Phil- The Second Proceedings (with Chaz Brenchley and Gail-Nina Anderson) (Side Real/Northern Gothic, ISBN 0-9542953-2-3)
- 2007: Phantoms at the Phil- The Third Proceedings (with Chaz Brenchley and Gail-Nina Anderson) (Side Real/Northern Gothic, ISBN 978-0-9542953-3-2)
- 2008: The Silence Room (Comma Press, ISBN 978-1905583171)
- 2018: Quartier Perdu (Comma Press, ISBN 978-1905583706)

=== Literary criticism ===
- 1998: The Deregulated Muse: Essays on Contemporary British and Irish Poetry (Bloodaxe)

== Sources ==
- The Oxford Companion to Twentieth-Century Poetry ed. Ian Hamilton (OUP, 1996)
- The Idea of North Peter Davidson (Reaktion Books, 2005)
