= Frederick Seidel =

American poet (born 1936)

Frederick Seidel (born February 19, 1936) is an American poet.

== Biography ==
Seidel was born to a family of Russian Jewish descent in St. Louis, Missouri in 1936. His family owned Seidel Coal and Coke, which supplied coal to the brewing industry in St. Louis, as well as a West Virginia mine. Seidel graduated from St. Louis Country Day School and earned his A.B. at Harvard University in 1957. Archibald MacLeish arranged for Seidel to take a leave of absence from Harvard so he could travel around Europe. In Europe Seidel spent time in Paris (where he took a virtual vow of silence for three months) and visited Oxford and Cambridge in England, where he met T. S. Eliot in London.

Seidel corresponded with Ezra Pound in his youth and visited Pound at St. Elizabeths Hospital. Despite not understanding the Chinese language, Seidel suggested corrections to Pound's translations of Confucius, The Unwobbling Pivot, which Pound accepted. After university Seidel moved with his wife to West Gloucester, Massachusetts, and then to Paris after Seidel became the Parisian editor of The Paris Review in 1961. He lives on the Upper West Side of Manhattan in New York City.

== Career ==
In 1962, his first book, Final Solutions, was chosen by a jury of Louise Bogan, Stanley Kunitz, and Robert Lowell for an award sponsored by the 92nd Street Y, with a $1,500 prize. However, both the association and the publisher rejected the manuscript for several reasons, one of which was that, in their opinion, "matter in one of the poems libeled a noted living person". Another was that the national head of the YMHA/YWHA expressed concern that some of the poems were "anti-Semitic and anti-Catholic", claims Seidel considered preposterous. When Seidel refused to make requested changes to his work, the prize was withdrawn and the promise of publication revoked. Bogan, Kunitz, and Lowell also resigned in protest.

This incident, in which Seidel's poetry offended readers, was a defining moment in his career, and one that he would repeat in subsequent books by consciously trying to offend—or at least, to shock—his readers (although none of his subsequent books caused anywhere near the same degree of controversy as his first). Random House published the book the following year, but seventeen years would pass before Seidel published another work. His second book, Sunrise, was the 1980 Lamont Poetry Selection. His book Going Fast was a finalist for the 1999 Pulitzer Prize for Poetry.

His collection, The Cosmos Poems, was commissioned by the American Museum of Natural History to celebrate the opening of the new Hayden Planetarium in 2000, and he won the PEN/Voelcker Award for Poetry in 2002. His collection Ooga-Booga was a finalist for the National Book Critics Circle Award and was shortlisted for the 2007 International Griffin Poetry Prize. A limited run of his collection of new verse, Evening Man was published in 2008. The following year saw the publication of the career-spanning anthology Poems: 1959–2009.

In 2016, Farrar, Straus and Giroux published his sixteenth collection of poems, Widening Income Equality. One of the poems in this collection, "The Ballad of Ferguson, Missouri", a response to the police shooting of teenager Michael Brown in Ferguson, Missouri, that was originally published in the November 25, 2014 edition of The Paris Review, sparked controversy online and on social media. That same year, Seidel received The Paris Review's Hadada Award, given for "a distinguished member of the writing community who has made a strong and unique contribution to literature."

== Style ==
In response to the publication of his Collected Poems, The New York Times Magazine's Wyatt Mason wrote a long piece on the poet, titled "Laureate of the Louche". New York Times book reviewer David Orr, in his review of Poems: 1959-2009, wrote, "[Seidel is] one of poetry's few scary characters." Seidel is frequently characterized as such, in part because in his writing he often makes use of violent and disturbing sexual imagery and presents himself as a rather unlikeable aesthete who embraces his own "elite" brand of materialism (extolling, for instance, his love of Ducati motorcycles and handmade shoes). However, Seidel often ironizes this persona, pushing it to cartoonish extremes.

Seidel's poetry comprises more than his outrageous poetic persona. He also writes poems that comment on contemporary events and are political/satirical (as is his poem "Bush's War"). His work is also notable in that he frequently makes use of rhyme and meter (both regular and irregular), including nursery rhyme-influenced references, repetitions and rhythms. One of Seidel's earliest influences was Robert Lowell. Seidel has stated, "The influence of Lowell [on my first book Final Solutions was] unmistakable." However, the critic Richard Poirier noted that Seidel had broken free of this influence by the time he published his second book, Sunrise.

== Bibliography ==
=== Poetry ===
- Final Solutions (New York: Random House, 1963)
- Sunrise (New York: Viking Press, 1979)
- Men and Woman: New and Selected Poems (London: Chatto & Windus, 1984)
- Poems, 1959-1979 (New York: Alfred A. Knopf, 1989)
- These Days (New York: Alfred A. Knopf, 1989)
- My Tokyo (New York: Farrar, Straus and Giroux, 1993)
- Going Fast (New York: Farrar, Straus and Giroux, 1998)
- The Cosmos Poems (New York: Farrar, Straus and Giroux, 2000)
- Life on Earth (New York: Farrar, Straus and Giroux, 2001)
- Area Code 212 (New York, Farrar, Straus and Giroux, 2002)
- The Cosmos Trilogy (New York: Farrar, Straus and Giroux, 2003)
- Ooga-Booga (New York: Farrar, Straus and Giroux, 2006)
- Evening Man (New York: Farrar, Straus and Giroux, 2008)
- Collected Poems: 1959-2009 (New York: Farrar, Straus and Giroux, 2009)
- Nice Weather, (New York: Farrar, Straus and Giroux, 2012)
- Widening Income Inequality, (New York: Farrar, Straus and Giroux, 2016)
- Peaches Goes It Alone (New York: Farrar, Straus and Giroux, 2018)
- Selected Poems (New York: Farrar, Straus and Giroux, 2021)
- So What: Poems (New York: Farrar, Straus and Giroux, 2024)

=== Critical studies and reviews of Seidel ===
- Matthews, Steven (Jun–Jul 2014). "Curious insulations". The London Magazine: 25–30. Review of Nice weather.
