= Don Paterson =

Scottish poet, writer and musician (born 1963)

Don Paterson OBE FRSE FRSL
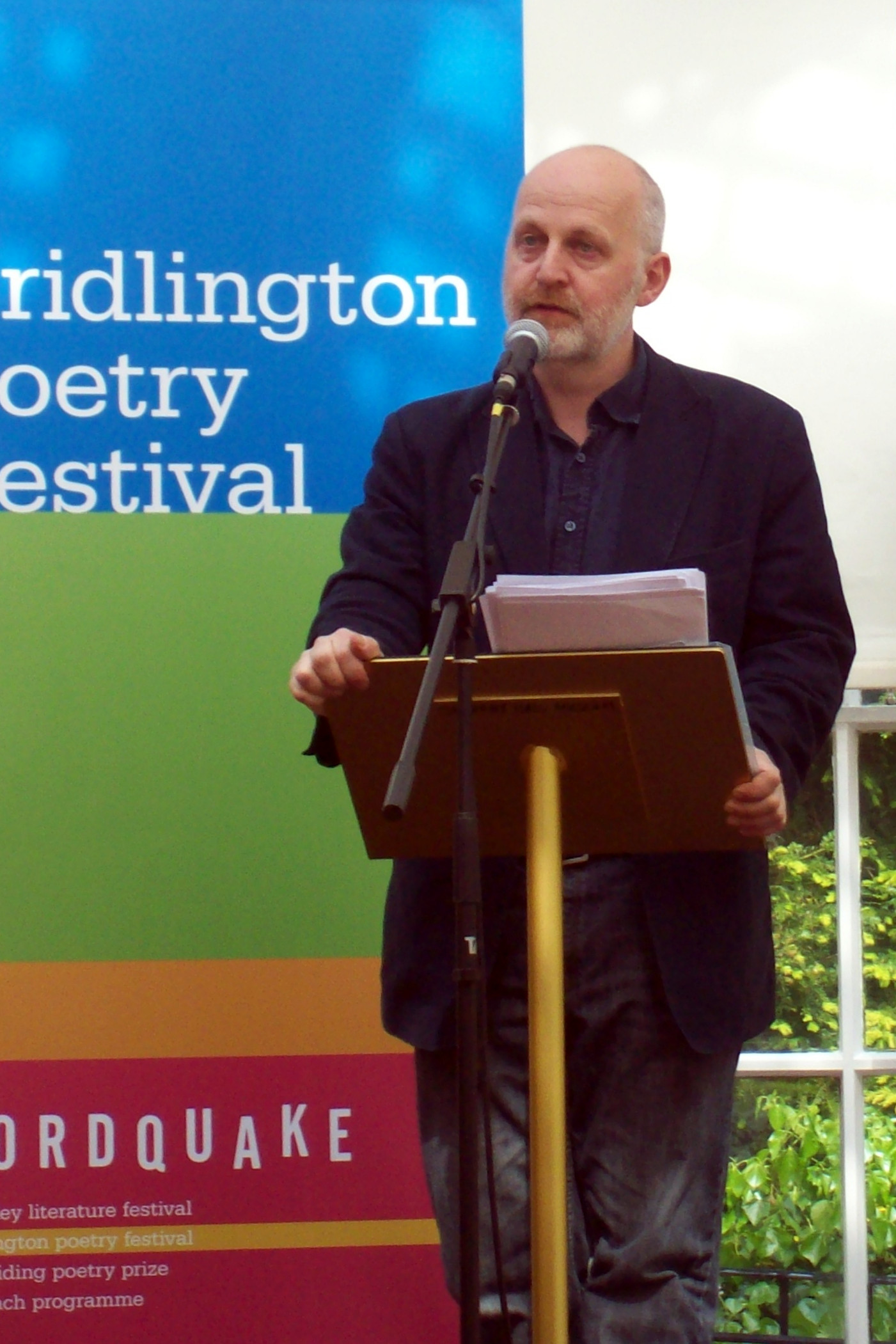
- at 2013 Bridlington Poetry Festival
- Born: Donald Paterson; 1963 (age 62–63); Dundee, Scotland
- Writing career
- Notable works: Nil Nil (1993); God's Gift to Women (1997); Landing Light (2003)
- Notable awards: Eric Gregory Award; Forward Poetry Prize; T. S. Eliot Prize; Geoffrey Faber Memorial Prize

Donald Paterson (born 1963 in Dundee) is a Scottish poet, writer and musician. His work has won several awards, including the Forward Poetry Prize, the T. S. Eliot Prize and the Geoffrey Faber Memorial Prize. He was recipient of the Queen's Gold Medal for Poetry 2009.

== Career ==
Paterson won an Eric Gregory Award in 1990 and his poem "A Private Bottling" won the Arvon Foundation International Poetry Competition in 1993. He was included on the list of 20 poets chosen for the Poetry Society's 1994 "New Generation Poets" promotion. In 2002, he was awarded a Scottish Arts Council Creative Scotland Award.

His first collection of poetry, Nil Nil (1993), won the Forward Poetry Prize for Best First Collection. God's Gift to Women (1997) won the T. S. Eliot Prize and the Geoffrey Faber Memorial Prize. The Eyes, adaptations of the work of Spanish poet Antonio Machado (1875–1939), was published in 1999. He is the editor of 101 Sonnets: From Shakespeare to Heaney (1999) and of Last Words: New Poetry for the New Century (1999) with Jo Shapcott. Paterson's collection of poems Landing Light (2003) won both the 2003 T. S. Eliot Prize and the 2003 Whitbread Poetry Award. He has also published three collections of aphorisms, The Book of Shadows (2004), The Blind Eye (2007) and Best Thought, Worst Thought (2008). Orpheus, his version of Rilke's Die Sonette an Orpheus, was published in 2006.

Paterson taught in the school of English at the University of St Andrews and was the poetry editor for London publishers Picador for more than 25 years. An accomplished jazz guitarist, he works solo and for ten years ran the jazz-folk ensemble Lammas with Tim Garland.

In 2012, Paterson wrote an open letter in The Herald criticising Scotland's arts funding council Creative Scotland.

In 2012–2013, he was the Weidenfeld Visiting professor of European Comparative Literature in St Anne's College, Oxford.

Paterson's memoir Toy Fights: A Boyhood was published Faber & Faber in January 2023.

== Honours and awards ==
He was appointed Officer of the Order of the British Empire (OBE) in the 2008 Birthday Honours. He was awarded the Queen's Gold Medal for Poetry 2009. He was elected a Fellow of the Royal Society of Literature in 2004. In 2015, Paterson was elected a Fellow of the Royal Society of Edinburgh.

== Bibliography ==
=== Poetry ===
Collections

- —— (1993). Nil Nil (hardcover 1st ed.). London: Faber & Faber. ISBN 9780571170876.
- —— (1997). God's Gift to Women. London: Faber & Faber. ISBN 9780571177622.
- —— (1999). The Eyes. Faber & Faber. ISBN 9780571200559.
- —— (2001). White Lie. Graywolf Press. ISBN 9781555973537.
- —— (2003). Landing Light.
- —— (2006). Orpheus.
- —— (2009). Rain. Farrar, Straus and Giroux. ISBN 9781466880689. (winner of Forward Poetry Prize)
- —— (2012). Selected Poems. Faber & Faber. ISBN 9780571281787.
- —— (2015). 40 Sonnets. Faber & Faber. ISBN 9780571310890. (shortlisted for the 2016 Griffin Poetry Prize)
- —— (2020). Zonal. Faber & Faber. ISBN 9780571338245.
- —— (2022). The Arctic. Faber & Faber. ISBN 9780571338184.

He also has contributed to

- —— (2019). A New Divan: A Lyrical Dialogue Between East and West. Gingko Library. ISBN 9781909942288.

Anthologies

- 101 Sonnets, 1999
- Last Words, 1999, with (Jo Shapcott)
- Robert Burns, poems selected by Don Paterson, 2001
- New British Poetry with Charles Simic, Graywolf Press, 2004, ISBN 9781555973940

List of poems

Title	Year	First published	Reprinted/collected
"Wave"	2014	The New Yorker	

=== Plays ===
- The Land of Cakes (with Gordon McPherson) (2001)
- A'body's Aberdee (2001)

=== Radio drama ===
- Kailyard Blues (1999)
- Ringing the Changes (1999) with (Jo Shapcott)
- The Aberdee Brief (2000)
- The Latecomers (2001)

=== Aphorisms ===
- The Book of Shadows Picador, 2004, ISBN 9780330431842
- The Blind Eye (2007)
- Best Thought, Worst Thought (2008)

=== Criticism ===
- Reading Shakespeare's Sonnets: A New Commentary. Faber & Faber. 2010. ISBN 978-0-571-26399-8.
- Smith: A Reader's Guide to the Poetry of Michael Donaghy (2014)
- The Poem. Faber & Faber. 2018. ISBN 9780571206629.

=== Critical studies and reviews of Paterson's work ===
- Wilkinson, Ben (2023). Don Paterson. Writers and Their Work (paperback ed.). Liverpool, UK: Liverpool University Press. ISBN 9781837644421. OCLC 1423118908.
- Chiasson, Dan (19 April 2010). "Forms of attention : Don Paterson's 'Rain'". The Critics. Books. The New Yorker. Vol. 86, no. 9.
- Pollard, Natalie, ed. (2014). Don Paterson: Contemporary Critical Essays. Edinburgh, U.K.: Edinburgh University Press. ISBN 9780748669424. OCLC 903488793.
