= Jo Shapcott =

English poet

Jo Shapcott FRSL
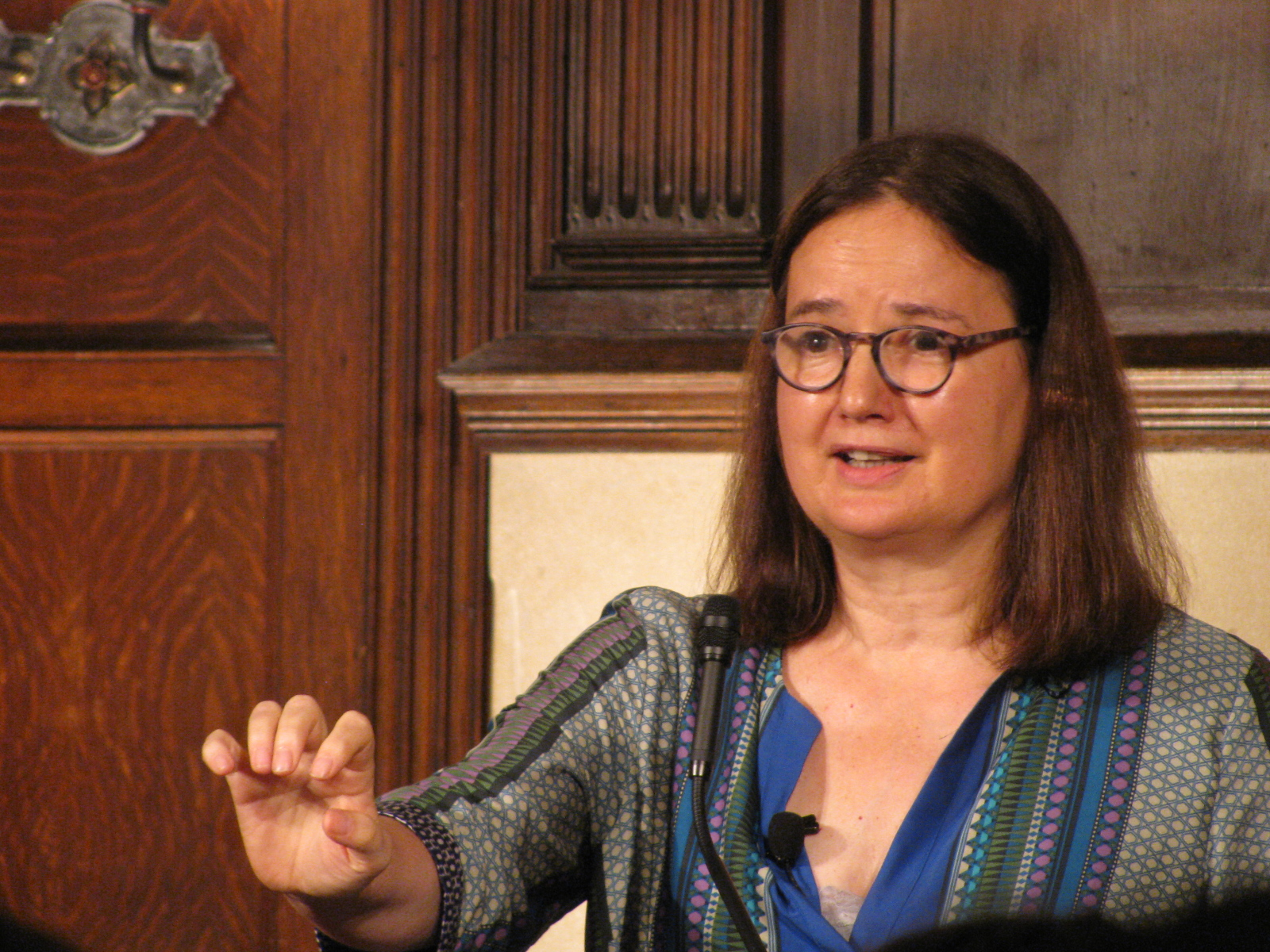
- at Lannan Poetry Series 2014
- Born: 24 March 1953 (age 73); London, United Kingdom
- Education: St Hilda's College, Oxford; Harvard University
- Writing career
- Language: English
- Genre: Poetry
- Notable work: Of Mutability (2010)
- Notable awards: National Poetry Competition; Commonwealth Poetry Prize; Costa Book of the Year Award; Forward Prize–Collection; Cholmondeley Award.

Jo Shapcott FRSL (born 24 March 1953 in London) is an English poet, editor and lecturer who has won the National Poetry Competition, the Commonwealth Poetry Prize, the Costa Book of the Year Award, a Forward Prizes for Poetry and the Cholmondeley Award.

== Early life and education ==
Jo Shapcott was born 24 March 1953 in London. She lived in Hemel Hempstead and attended Cavendish School in the town prior to studying as an undergraduate at Trinity College, Dublin. Later she studied at St Hilda's College, Oxford and received a Harkness Fellowship to Harvard.

== Career ==
Shapcott teaches on the MA in creative writing at Royal Holloway, University of London. She was a visiting professor at the School of English Literature, Language and Linguistics, Newcastle University, was a visiting professor at the London Institute and was Royal Literary Fund Fellow at Oxford Brookes University from 2003 to 2005. She is a longstanding tutor for the Arvon Foundation. and a former president of the Poetry Society.

Shapcott was appointed as CBE in 2002. She initially accepted the honour but decided to refuse during the period when the British government made preparations to invade Iraq. She wrote to the Cabinet Office saying " I can't possibly accept this." She commented, "I was being diagnosed and treated for cancer, so great public statements weren't on the cards really. I was just too ill."

In 2016, Shapcott was welcomed as a trustee to The Griffin Trust For Excellence In Poetry. In 2019 she was a contributor to A New Divan: A Lyrical Dialogue between East and West (Gingko Library).

== Writing ==
Shapcott has won the National Poetry Competition twice, in 1985 and 1991. Her Book: Poems 1988-1998 (2000; reprinted 2006) consists of poetry from her three earlier collections: Electroplating the Baby (1988), which won the Commonwealth Poetry Prize for Best First Collection, Phrase Book (1992), and My Life Asleep (1998), which won the Forward Poetry Prize (Best Collection). Together with Matthew Sweeney, she edited Emergency Kit: Poems for Strange Times (1996), an international anthology of contemporary poetry in English. Her 2002 book Tender Taxes is a collection of English versions (or translations) of Rainer Maria Rilke's French poems. Her 2002 collection of essays Elizabeth Bishop: Poet of the Periphery was co-edited with Linda Anderson. In 2006, Fiona Samson in The Guardian summarised her work: "Shapcott remains overwhelmingly a poet of presence, renegotiating the concrete world with as much brio as her own dancing cow. The consummate openness of this brilliantly intelligent selection extends the possibilities for poetry written in English. It reminds us that she remains a pioneer among contemporary British writers. We should be grateful for her."

In 2010, Shapcott published Of Mutability with Faber & Faber, her first collection for 12 years. The 45 poems explore the nature of change, in the body, within the natural world and inside relationships. The book of poems was awarded the Costa Book of the Year for 2010, beating contenders in Fiction, Non-Fiction and other categories. The judges commented that the book was accessible, "very special and unusual and uplifting... The subject matter was so relevant that if any poetry book could capture the spirit of life in 2011, this would be it". Sinclair Mackay in the Daily Telegraph wrote: "Of Mutability, is so especially rich and resonant that it deserves the widest possible readership, even among those who never usually think of reading poems...And there is a dazzling variety of tone and colour and subject throughout - Shapcott's language dances lightly, and often with wit."

The Transformers is an unpublished collection of public lectures given by Shapcott in 2001 as part of her Professorship at Newcastle.

She has written lyrics or had her poems set to music by composers such as Nigel Osborne, Errollyn Wallen and John Woolrich. The American composer Stephen Montague created the work The Creatures Indoors, from her poetry. It was premiered by the London Symphony Orchestra at the Barbican Centre in London in 1997.

She was a judge for the 2014 Griffin Poetry Prize, as well as the 2013 Hippocrates Prize for Poetry and Medicine.

== Prizes and awards ==
=== Literary Awards ===
Year	Work	Award	Category	Result	Ref.
1982	?	South West Arts Literature Award	—	Won	
1985	"The Surrealists' Summer Convention Came to Our City"	National Poetry Competition	—	Won	
1989	Electroplating the Baby	Commonwealth Poetry Prize	—	Won	
1989	?	New Statesman Prudence Farmer Award	—	Won	
1991	"Phrase Book"	National Poetry Competition	—	Won	
1999	My Life Asleep	Forward Prizes for Poetry	Poetry Collection of the Year	Won	
2006	—	Cholmondeley Award	—	Won	
2010	Of Mutability	Costa Book Award	Overall	Won	
2010	Of Mutability	Costa Book Award	Poetry	Won	

=== Honours ===
- 1978–80 – Harvard University Harkness Fellowship
- 1999 – Fellow of the Royal Society of Literature
- 2002 – CBE (Refused)
- 2011 – The Queen's Gold Medal for Poetry
- 2011 – Honorary Fellowship, University of Chichester

== Books ==
=== Poetry collections ===
- —— (1988). Electroplating the Baby. Bloodaxe. ISBN 9781852240684.
- —— (1992). Phrase Book. Oxford University Press. ISBN 9780192829511.
- —— (1996). A Journey to the Inner Eye: A Guide for All. South Bank Centre.
- —— (1996). Motherland. Gwaithel & Gilwern. ISBN 9781952755811.
- —— (1998). My Life Asleep. Oxford University Press. ISBN 9780192881038.
- —— (1999). Poetry Quartets No. 5. Bloodaxe.
- —— (2000). Her Book: Poems 1988-1998. Faber & Faber. ISBN 9780571264476.
- —— (2002). Tender Taxes. Faber & Faber. ISBN 9780571264483.
- —— (2010). Of Mutability. Faber & Faber. ISBN 9780571268566.

Work with writers

- ——; Dunmore, Helen; Sweeney, Matthew (1997). Penguin Modern Poets: Book 12. Penguin Books. ISBN 9780140587968.

=== Collected prose ===
—— (2011). The Transformers: The Newcastle/Bloodaxe Poetry Lectures. Bloodaxe. ISBN 9781852245795.

=== Editor ===
- Shapcott; Matthew Sweeney, eds. (1996). Emergency Kit: Poems for Strange Times. Faber & Faber.
- Shapcott; Don Paterson, eds. (1999). Last Words: New Poetry for the New Century. Picador.
- Shapcott; Linda Anderson, eds. (2002). Elizabeth Bishop: Poet of the Periphery. Newcastle/Bloodaxe.
