= The Poetry Review =

Magazine of The Poetry Society

- Editor: Wayne Holloway-Smith
- Former editors: Harold Monro (1912); Stephen Phillips (1913–15); Galloway Kyle (1916–47); Muriel Spark (1947–49); Gawsworth (1949–52); Thomas Moult (1952–62); Eric Mottram (1970–85); Garfitt & Forbes (1985–2002); Fiona Sampson (2005–12); Maurice Riordan (2013–17); Emily Berry (2017–22)
- Categories: literary magazine
- Frequency: Quarterly
- Founded: 1912
- Company: The Poetry Society
- Country: United Kingdom
- Based in: London
- Language: English
- Website: The Poetry Review
- ISSN: 0032-2156

The Poetry Review is the magazine of The Poetry Society, edited by the poet Wayne Holloway-Smith. Founded in 1912, shortly after the establishment of the Society, previous editors have included poets Muriel Spark, Adrian Henri, Andrew Motion and Maurice Riordan.

== Background ==
Founded in January 1912, the publication took over from the Poetical Gazette, a members' news magazine for the newly formed Poetry Society. It was first edited by Harold Monro, who was ousted after a year by alarmed, more conservative-minded trustees. He was followed by Stephen Phillips (1913–15).

Galloway Kyle, The Poetry Society's founder and director, presided over the Review from 1916 to 1947. He managed to keep the magazine running during the blitzing of London, despite ongoing bombing of the neighbourhood and the damage of Kyle's own home. He declared that he wanted to make poetry popular, "the common heritage and joy to all", geared to a common everyman, bringing poetry down from its "ivory tower"."We should look forward as well as backward," Kyle stated, "but in reality the latter is more necessary than the former, and it is particularly essential in relation to a poet who may find the times too noisy, too self-centred and too self-righteous to heed him". During both world wars Kyle paid particular attention to people serving in the armed forces, publishing their work and letters, interested in eye-witness accounts. Patriotic and populist, reliable and comforting to its readers during these times of chaos, the Review had its largest ever audience. Published bi-monthly at the time, the readership rose from approximately 1000 before World War I to more than 6000 per issue by the end of World War II. Kyle appointed Alice Hunt Bartlett as American Associate Editor from 1923 and the publication featured significant content from the US during the 1920s and 1930s. The American journal Poetry, founded at the same time as the Review, during the spring of 1912, was originally often regarded as a sister journal with the similar purpose of building the audience for contemporary poetry. Their roads soon separated. Poetry set out to establish itself as a home for serious critique, desiring to be select, radical, the leader of the field. Kyle was editor until his death in 1967 at the age of 92.

Muriel Spark led the Review dynamically from 1947 to 1949, introducing a fee to be paid to contributors, but she was ousted for her poetic radicalism and liberal views. An editorial board presided from 1952 to 1962, led by Thomas Moult. Derek Parker handed over to avant-garde poet Eric Mottram in 1970, who was followed by Roger Garfitt and Peter Forbes (1985–2002). Other former editors include Adrian Henri, Andrew Motion and Mick Imlah. Fiona Sampson held the role from 2005 to 2012. A series of guest editors followed—George Szirtes, Charles Boyle, Bernardine Evaristo, Moniza Alvi, Esther Morgan and Patrick McGuinness—until Summer 2013, when Maurice Riordan assumed the editorship for the next four years.

The Review was at first a monthly magazine and then from 1915 to 1951 became bi-monthly, turning quarterly in 1952. It has published the work of poets including Thomas Hardy, Rupert Brooke, Robert Frost, W. H. Auden, Ezra Pound, Philip Larkin and Allen Ginsberg.

Edited and introduced by the then editor Fiona Sampson, the 400-page book A Century of Poetry Review was published by Carcanet Press to mark the Poetry Society's centenary in 2009. In Spring 2014 the magazine returned to the title The Poetry Review. The current editor is the poet Wayne Holloway-Smith, who succeeded Emily Berry following the Spring 2022 issue, who in turn succeeded Maurice Riordan with the Spring 2017 issue. It is published in March, June, September and December and given to each subscribing member of The Poetry Society.
