= Adam Lowe (writer) =

British LGBTQ writer (born 1985)

The Honourable Adam Lowe
- Born: 1985 (age 40–41); Leeds, England
- Education: University of Leeds, University of Manchester
- Occupations: Writer, publisher, performer, teacher
- Writing career
- Period: 2002–present
- Genres: Poetry, plays, fiction, novel, short story, science fiction
- Subjects: Black British, LGBT, disabled
- Notable works: Precocious, Patterflash
- Website: adam-lowe.com

Adam Lowe (born 1985) is a British writer, performer and publisher from Leeds who currently lives in Manchester. He is the UK's LGBT+ History Month Poet Laureate and was Yorkshire's Poet for 2012 (the county's selected poet for the 2012 Olympics). He writes poetry, plays and fiction, and he occasionally performs as Beyonce Holes.

== Biography ==
Adam Lowe is of Afro-Caribbean (St. Kitts), British and Irish descent. He is the child of Alison Lowe, Baroness Lowe of Armley, and like her graduated with both a BA and MA from the University of Leeds. He is currently studying for a PhD at the University of Manchester. His family was the subject of the 1999 ITV docu-soap Family Life (Lion TV). He is genderfluid and primarily uses he/his pronouns, except when in drag.

On 21 August 2026, Lowe's mother was made a Life Peer in the British House of Lords. As the child of a Lord, Lowe automatically gained the courtesy title of The Honourable.

== Writing, publishing and performance ==
Adam Lowe writes about disability, LGBT+ experiences, the lives of mixed race/Black British communities and the intersections between them.

Lowe is the UK's first LGBT+ History Month Poet Laureate. With afshan d'souza-lodhi, he co-founded and runs Young Enigma, a writer development project for young writers. He is Editor-in-Chief of Vada Magazine and Dog Horn Publishing, and works in the publicity department of Peepal Tree Press.

Lowe has performed around the world, at a variety of venues, festivals and conferences, including the Commonword Black and Asian Writers Conference, and is chair of the charity Black Gold Arts. He is an advocate for LGBTQ+ rights and sits on the management committee for Schools OUT UK, the charity that founded LGBT+ History Month in the UK.

He was formerly Features Editor for Bent Magazine and Editor of a speculative fiction magazine called Polluto.

In 2010, he was writer-in-residence at I Love West Leeds Arts Festival in Armley, the area where he was raised as the son of a local councillor. He studied under Madani Younis at Freedom Studios in Bradford. He was also announced as a finalist for the 22nd Annual Lambda Literary Awards in the Transgender Literature category with his novella Troglodyte Rose (later, a selection from the book would be a Wattpad featured story getting over 190,000 reads).

In 2011, Lowe was writer on attachment at West Yorkshire Playhouse, and partnered with composer Nikki Franklin for Leeds Lieder+ at Leeds College of Music, before the two collaborated on a new work, "Mary", for the BBC Singers.

In 2012, his pamphlet Precocious (Fruit Bruise Press) was a reader nomination for the Guardian First Book Prize, which the publication described as "A vivid picture of emotions, deeply felt, but with a clear-eyed view of the ways we humans live, love and sometimes betray". He also had a residency at Zion Arts Centre.

That year he was Yorkshire's poet for the 12 Poets of 2012 scheme, celebrating the 2012 Olympics and the 2012 Cultural Olympiad, where he visited boxer Anthony Ogogo on a training session to inspire the writing of an Olympic-themed poem for the Queen Elizabeth Olympic Park. The final poem was performed by the National Lottery Draw Show's Voice of the Balls Alan Dedicoat at the National Lottery Plot in the Olympic Park on 3 September 2012. Later that year, Lowe was published in MTV Books' Chorus: A Literary Mixtape, edited by Saul Williams and Dufflyn Lammers.

In 2013, he was announced as one of 10 Black and Asian "advanced poets" for The Complete Works II (founded by Bernardine Evaristo) with Mona Arshi, Jay Bernard, Kayo Chingonyi, Rishi Dastidar, Edward Doegar, Inua Ellams, Sarah Howe, Eileen Pun and Warsan Shire, which resulted in the anthology Ten: The New Wave, edited by Karen McCarthy Woolf. He was mentored on the programme by Patience Agbabi. He also made the list of "20 under 40" writers in Leeds for the LS13 Awards, where Lowe was given as an example of "the non-conformist and boundary-breaking approach to writing in Leeds".

In 2014, he toured his solo show, Ecstasies, which began at Contact Theatre's Queer Contact. He performed a poem about cruising for 4thought.tv on Channel 4.

In 2015, his Polari poem "Vada That" was selected as The Guardian Poem of the Week. His play Friend Roulette ran for a week at the Amersham Arms in London. The play received a four-star review in Theatre Bubble, describing the play as "a comment on the real life app, Grindr, where users meet for sex and chance encounters. The intensity of the meetings that can only be virtual and therefore 'not real'". The Guardian referred to the short play, in published form, as "a fine playlet".

In 2017, he performed with composer Nikki Franklin in the Speaker's Chambers at the House of Commons for LGBT History Month. In 2018–9, he featured in the British Library's Windrush Stories exhibition, performing a poem based on the Lord's Prayer. In 2019, his poem 'Bone Railroad', about slavery and the Middle Passage was selected as Poem of the Week by The Yorkshire Times. He also joined drag performers, including Cheddar Gorgeous and Anna Phylactic, in a protest against the state visit of Donald Trump in London.

In 2021, he contributed a poem called "Writing Myself in History" and performed a lip sync of Regina Spektor's "Us" for Manchester Museum, as part of Pride Month. The poem and performance explore ideas of queering the archive and contested ownership. As Beyonce Holes, he also performed at the Manchester Pride at Home event with Cheddar Gorgeous, doing a number inspired by #BlackLivesMatter to Nina Simone's "Sinnerman".

In June 2022, Lowe performed at the Royal Albert Memorial Museum and Art Gallery in Exeter with Mona Arshi, Victoria Adukwei Bulley, Fred D'Aguiar, Jennifer Lee Tsai, Shivanee Ramlochan, Jacob Sam-La Rose, John Siddique, Yomi Sode and Yusra Warsama as part of the My Words collaboration with the Museum of Colour, curated by Melanie Abrahams. The poets were accompanied by live music and vocals from Randolph Matthews. As part of the My Words programme, Lowe also contributed a poem called "Seasoning" to the Museum of Colour, inspired by a set of chains used in the transatlantic trade in enslaved Africans. In October 2022, he edited the anthology The World Reimagined, featuring 30 poets, including Anthony Joseph, Benjamin Zephaniah, Dorothea Smartt, John Agard, Karen McCarthy Woolf, Kadija Sesay, Khadijah Ibrahiim, Malika Booker, Marvin Thompson, Otis Mensah, Raymond Antrobus, Shara McCallum, Shivanee Ramlochan, Tanya Shirley and others. The book was published by The World Reimagined, an arts education charity which "exists to transform our understanding of the Transatlantic Trade in Enslaved Africans".

In December 2022, Lowe co-authored the scientific paper "What Primary Care Practitioners Need to Know about the New NICE Guideline for Myalgic Encephalomyelitis/Chronic Fatigue Syndrome in Adults" in the journal Healthcare, writing as a lay person with lived experience of ME/CFS.

In 2023, Peepal Tree Press published Lowe's debut (full-length) poetry collection, Patterflash, as "[a] collection [which] connects the poet as a wry, humane observer of the scene, particularly as conducted in Manchester, and the persona of 'Adam Lowe' as both actor in and narrator of his own dramas, who performs, exults and sometimes suffers in a wide range of guises and disguises." The collection includes several poems in Polari. To support the book, Lowe was announced as one of the authors in attendance at Bocas Lit Fest 2023 in Trinidad. He gave a workshop on intimacy in poetry, as well as a reading with Andre Bagoo and Padraig Regan. In 2024, Patterflash was longlisted for the Polari First Book Prize.

== Literary reception ==
Patience Agbabi said of Lowe's debut collection Patterflash: "Effervescent with verbal velocity, buzzing with innuendo and insight, often pithy, sometimes poignant, Patterflash is a lovesong to language. Adam Lowe switches brilliantly between registers, from Polari to Yorkshire vernacular to everything in between. The effect is thrilling. This unique debut demands a standing ovation. I loved it!"

Andrew McMillan described it as: "A collection of ecstatic queer hymns that walk us through Leeds, through Manchester, with the unique language of being young and queer in the north."

Carol Rumens of The Guardian describes Adam Lowe as a "versatile and widely published young writer". In 2012, the readers for the Guardian First Book Prize described Lowe's chapbook "Precocious" as "A vivid picture of emotions, deeply felt, but with a clear-eyed view of the ways we humans live, love and sometimes betray".

In 2013, Lowe was given as an example of "the non-conformist and boundary-breaking approach to writing in Leeds" when recognising his work at the LS13 Awards. In 2014, Sohini Basak of Sabotage Reviews wrote of Lowe's poems in Ten: The New Wave, edited by Karen McCarthy Woolf (Bloodaxe): "Adam Lowe also merges the then with the now, reworking Sappho, stories from the Bible and Babylon seamlessly, in subversive narratives, claiming them as personal and political points of protest."

In 2015, a four-star review of his play "Friend Roulette" in Theatre Bubble said, "Friend Roulette by LGBT writer Adam Lowe, directed by Rachel Owens, sheds light on a gay friendship that is pushed by.. society? inhibitions? fear? into the confines of a chat room (Friend Roulette). But it could also be a comment on the real life app, Grindr, where users meet for sex and chance encounters. The intensity of the meetings that can only be virtual and therefore 'not real' for one of the friends, played by Robert Wallis, causes him to break free for the real world, leaving his internet friend Jonathan Woodhouse, stuck in the hell of a darkened room." The Guardian referred to the short play, in published form, as "a fine playlet that [the reviewer] was very impressed by".

In 2018, poet Shivanee Ramlochan wrote of Lowe's poem "Traces of Invasion" on her website Novel Niche: "Lowe serves us these trifle-and-gunsmoke slices of revelation, of bitter disappointment and brined satisfaction: clean, and clear, and right between the eyes. It isn't easy for a poem to do this, to wind itself around you without the commonly-perceived artifice of poetic apparatus." In a 2019 review for The Yorkshire Times, Steve Whitaker writes of Lowe's Middle Passage elegy, "Kennaway's métier is reinvented in Adam Lowe's fine poem of restorative commemoration, 'Bone Railroad'".

Publishers Weekly, in reviewing More Fiya, refers to the anthology's varied poems as like "the 'funny thing' that Adam Lowe calls desire—complex, surprising, and radical in both theme and structure, and whole in their moments of fragility and strength".

Poet Safiya Kamaria Kinshasa said of one of Lowe's poems in Filigree: "I am in awe of 'Boy-Machine', I was tipping towards the edge of my chair willing this brave soul's flight to end in a more satisfying outcome than Icarus'. The storytelling is breathtaking, I could feel my bones consulting with my DNA to negotiate if I could grow wings for a brief moment. My bones settled for a re-reading."

In 2023, Lloyd (Meadhbh) Houston wrote, for The Times Literary Supplement, about one of Lowe's poems in the anthology 100 Queer Poems: "Adam Lowe's 'Vada That' [...] exuberantly resuscitates the now-defunct queer cryptolect Polari to offer a portrait of a 'bimbo bit of hard' on the cruise for 'trade'".

The Forward Book of Poetry 2023 includes work by Adam Lowe as a "highly commended" poem.

== Songwriting ==
In 2006, Lowe wrote the lyrics and performed the vocals for a hard house/trance single called 'Some Justice' with DJ GRH & Paul Maddox.

== Teaching and mentoring ==
Lowe has taught for The Poetry School, English PEN, the University of Leeds and the University of Central Lancashire. Through Young Enigma, he has worked with and supported writers such as Andrew McMillan and Afshan D'souza Lodhi. Young Enigma writers have performed alongside Patience Agbabi, Gerry Potter and Jackie Kay.

He was a Slate Enabler for Eclipse Theatre, advocating for BAME artists in Greater Manchester; and is currently chair of Black Gold Arts, a charity which primarily mentors and supports QTIPOC artists in the region.

== Awards and honours ==
- 2023: Poetry Book Society Recommendation for Patterflash, Summer 2023
- 2013: LGBT+ History Month Poet Laureate
- 2013: LS13 Awards: '20 best writers under 40' in Leeds
- 2012: Yorkshire's Poet for 2012

== Bibliography ==
- The Forward Book of Poetry 2024 (Faber & Faber, 2024)
- Patterflash (Peepal Tree Press, 2023)
- The World Reimagined, edited by Adam Lowe (The World Reimagined, 2022)
- What Primary Care Practitioners Need to Know about the New NICE Guideline for Myalgic Encephalomyelitis/Chronic Fatigue Syndrome in Adults, with Caroline Kingdon, Charles Shepherd and Luis Nacul (Healthcare 2022, 10: 12, 2438)
- 100 Queer Poems, edited by Mary Jean Chan and Andrew McMillan (Vintage, 2022)
- More Fiya: A New Collection of Black British Poetry, edited by Kayo Chingonyi (Canongate, 2021)
- Magma 75: The Loss Issue, edited by Adam Lowe and Yvonne Reddick (Magma Poetry, 2019)
- Best British Poetry 2015, edited by Roddy Lumsden (Salt Publishing, 2015)
- Spoke: New Queer Voices (as editor) (Fruit Bruise Press, 2015)
- Ten: The New Wave, edited by Karen McCarthy Woolf (Bloodaxe Books, 2014)
- LS13: A New Generation of Leeds Writers, edited by Wes Brown (Valley Press, 2013)
- Black and Gay in the UK, edited by John R. Gordon and Rikki Beadle Blair (Team Angelica Publishing, 2014)
- Best New Writing 2012: The Winners of the Eric Hoffer Prize for Prose (Hopewell Publications, 2012)
- Precocious (Fruit Bruise Press, 2012)
