= Magma Poetry =

London-based magazine of and about poetry

Magma
- Magma 81 – "Anthropocene" cover
- Editor: Cheryl Moskowitz; Elizabeth Lewis Williams; Branwell Roberts
- Former editors: Various
- Categories: Poetry
- Frequency: Three times annually
- Publisher: Short Run Press Limited, Exeter (print); Exact Editions (online)
- Founder: Helen Nicholson; Laurie Smith
- First issue: March 1994; 32 years ago
- Company: Magma Poetry
- Country: United Kingdom
- Based in: London, England
- Language: English
- Website: Magma
- ISSN: 2514-3611

Magma Poetry, better known mononymously as Magma, is a London-based poetry magazine, publishing work on and about poetry, and known for appointing a different editor every issue. It was founded by Helen Nicholson and Laurie Smith in 1994, with its first issue edited by Smith, and appearing in March 1994. Since 1994, a total of 91 issues of Magma have appeared by December 2024. The team run the Magma Poetry, Pamphlet and Subscribers-only competitions.

== Early days ==
Conceived sometime in "the summer of 1992" with 'Urban Fox' as one of the proposed names, Magma was founded by Nicholson and Smith in 1994. It is published three times a year, usually in spring, summer and autumn. The original team also included Mick Delap, David Boll (chairman), Peter Ashton Jones and Martin Sonenberg (illustrations), and Ronald Frank (treasurer). Nicholson, at that time, served as secretary, and Smith as editorial secretary. In 1994, Magma worked with the City Lit, being located in Stukeley Street, off Drury Lane, and called themselves The Stukeley Press.

The first issue of Magma featured eleven poets, and the second, edited by Boll, included work by fourteen poets. An interview with poet Carol Ann Duffy was published in the third. In their Autumn 1995 newsletter, the Suffolk Poetry Society called Magma "well presented and printed", noting their "good selection of poetry." In later issues, reviews have also had an important place in the magazine.

The subtitle in the initial issues was "New Poetry from Around the World", which they stopped using after No. 18, and the cover became similar to as it is today from Magma 27, the Autumn 2003 issue. The current subtitle for the magazine is "The poetry magazine with a different editor every issue", and the issues are now themed, with the issue editors specialising in the said kind of poetry. The first themed issue, however, was No. 19 ("New Love Poems") which was edited by Mick Delap. The current cover design pattern for Magma was first taken up in No. 56 – "The Poetry of Clothes", edited by the poets Julia Bird and Helen Mort. It was further tweaked, although only a little (perhaps to make it look more organised), in No. 65, and then in No. 68.

== Later years ==
In 2005, Magma, working with SeaBritain 2005, conducted a poll to identify the UK's "favourite sea poem". The poem 'Sea Fever', published in 1900 by John Masefield, the UK Poet Laureate between 1930 and 1967, won the vote. Some of the other poems included in the top 10 were Martin Newell's 'The Song of the Waterlily', Samuel Taylor Coleridge's 'The Rime of the Ancient Mariner', and 'Christmas At Sea' by Robert Louis Stevenson.

In "celebration of 50 issues of Magma", a new poetry competition was launched in October 2011. The first ever judge for the competition was George Szirtes. After 2011, the competition has been judged by such poets as Caroline Bird, Daljit Nagra Marvin Thompson, Victoria Kennefick, and Andrew McMillan. The list of winners has included Maggie Smith, Inua Ellams, Jonathan Edwards, James Pollock, and Mona Arshi, who was the winner of the inaugural competition for her poem 'Hummingbird', and judge for the 2017/18 competition.

Celebrating 25 years, the Open Pamphlet Competition was announced in 2018 by Lisa Kelly, Chair of Magma. The inaugural winner was Alice Willitts's Dear, selected by the board members and published in 2019. The later winners of the competition have been: Alexa Winik, for Close River (selected by Mary Jean Chan, judge for the Magma Open Pamphlet Competition 2020), Asim Khan, for Annihilation (selected by Alycia Pirmohamed, judge for the 2022 competition), and Michael Greavy for The Man Who Made Up Trees (selected by Niall Campbell, who judged the 2024 competition).

In 2020, the University of Central Lancashire-based poet and researcher Yvonne Reddick was awarded an AHRC grant of £92,720. A proposition was to work with Magma to inspire writing about the environment. The said issue was published in Autumn/October 2021, as Magma 81 – "Anthropocene". Reddick was also an editor, with Adam Lowe, of the "Loss" issue, in which they commissioned "a series of poems" that would explore loss. One of the poems, 'The Little Miracles' written by Malika Booker, went on to win the Forward Prize for Best Single Poem in 2020.

In 2021, the team launched their then 27-year archive on the Exact Editions platform, which also contains many other journals' archives, such as those of The Poetry Review and Modern Poetry in Translation.

== Publication ==
Today, Magma receives well over "thousands of submissions" from the UK and abroad, and a large number of poets and artists of related fields have so far worked towards editing its many issues. Some of the more popular names include Clare Pollard, Roddy Lumsden, Helen Mort, Hannah Lowe, Ilya Kaminsky, Victoria Kennefick and Ian McEwan. Below is an extensive list of people who have edited Magma since 1994.

=== 1994 ===
- 1 (Spring): Laurie Smith
- 2 (Summer): David Boll
- 3 (Winter): Vicci Bentley

=== 1995 ===
- 4 (Spring): Helen Nicholson
- 5 (Summer): Mark Reid
- 6 (Autumn): Rick Roots

=== 1996 ===
- 7 (Spring): Mick Delap
- 8 (Summer): Martin Sonenberg
- 9 (Autumn): John Stammers

=== 1997 ===
- 10 (Summer): Sarah Brown
- 11 (Winter): Tim Kindberg

=== 1998 ===
- 12 (Spring): Mary MacRae
- 13 (Winter): Jane Ormerod

=== 1999 ===
- 14 (Spring): Gautam Naik
- 15 (Autumn): Laurie Smith

=== 2000 ===
- 16 (Winter): David Boll
- 17 (Spring): Karen Green
- 18 (Autumn): Mary MacRae

=== 2001 ===
- 19 (Autumn) – "New Love Poems": Mick Delap
- 20 (Summer): Helen Nicholson
- 21 (Autumn): Laurie Smith

=== 2002 ===
- 22 (Winter): David Boll
- 23 (Summer): Karen Green
- 24 (Autumn): Pat Ransford

=== 2003 ===
- 25 (Winter) – "Poetry on Foreign Lands": Tim Kindberg
- 26 (Summer) – "Questions of travel": Mick Delap
- 27 (Autumn) – "Same-sex relationships": Tim Robertson

=== 2004 ===
- 28 (Spring): Laurie Smith
- 29 (Summer): David Boll

=== 2004/05 ===
- 30 (Winter) – "10th Anniversary Issue": Karen Green

=== 2005 ===
- January – "10th Anniversary Anthology": Tim Robertson
- 31 (Spring): John Stammers
- 32 (Summer) – "Measuring the Sea": Mick Delap
- 33 (Winter) – "The unnoticed, the ignored": Tim Kindberg

=== 2006 ===
- 34 (Spring): Mark McGuinness
- 35 (Summer): Tim Robertson
- 36 (Autumn) – "Inscapes – Charting the Interior": Anne-Marie Fyfe

=== 2007 ===
- 37 (Spring): Laurie Smith
- 38 (Summer): David Boll
- 39 (Autumn): David Morphet

=== 2008 ===
- 40 (Spring) – "Passions and Obsessions": Roddy Lumsden
- 41 (Autumn): Karen Green & Linda Black
- 42 (Autumn): Laurie Smith & Jacqueline Saphra

=== 2009 ===
- 43 (Spring): David Boll & Andrew Neilson
- 44 (Summer): Tim Kindberg & Rosie Shepperd
- 45 (Autumn): Clare Pollard

=== 2010 ===
- 46 (Spring): Jacqueline Saphra & Norbert Hirschhorn
- 47 (Summer): Annie Freud & Roberta James
- 48 (Autumn): Laurie Smith & Rob A Mackenzie

=== 2011 ===
- 49 (Spring): Julia Bird
- 50 (Summer): Clare Pollard & Mary Tymkow
- 51 (Autumn): Jacqueline Saphra & Ian McEwan

=== 2012 ===
- 52 (Spring) – "Putting On The Mask": Roberta James & Helen Nicholson
- 53 (Summer) – "Poetry and Music": Rob A Mackenzie & Kona Macphee
- 54 (Autumn) – "The Visible and the Invisible": Judy Brown & Cherry Smyth

=== 2013 ===
- 55 (Spring) – "The Soul & The Machine": Tim Kindberg & Karen McCarthy Woolf
- 56 (Summer) – "The Poetry of Clothes": Julia Bird & Helen Mort
- 57 (Summer) – "The Shape of the Poem": Ian McEwen & Hannah Lowe

=== 2014 ===
- 58 (Spring) – "The Music of Words": Laurie Smith & Richard Morris
- 59 (Summer) – "Breaks": Roberta James & Alex Pryce
- 60 (Autumn) – "Freedom": Rob A Mackenzie & Tony Williams

=== 2015 ===
- 61 (Spring) – "The Street": Jon Sayers & Nick Sunderland
- 62 (Summer) – "Violence": Chris Kerr & Kayo Chingonyi
- 63 (Autumn) – "Conversation": Susannah Hart & Lisa Kelly

=== 2016 ===
- 64 (Spring) – "Risk": Dom Bury & Jon Stone
- 65 (Summer) – "Revolution": Laurie Smith & Jane R Rogers
- 66 (Winter) – "Comedy": John Canfield & Ella Frears

=== 2017 ===
- 67 (Spring) – "Bones & Breath": Rob A. Mackenzie & A.B. Jackson
- 68 (Summer) – "Margins": David Floyd & Lucy Howard-Taylor
- 69 (Winter) – "The Deaf Issue": Lisa Kelly & Raymond Antrobus

=== 2018 ===
- 70 (Spring) – "Europe": Susannah Hart & Paul Stephenson
- 71 (Summer) – "The Film Issue": Cheryl Moskowitz & Stav Poleg
- 72 (Autumn) – "The Climate Change Issue": Matt Howard, Fiona Moore & Eileen Pun

=== 2019 ===
- 73 (Spring) – "Changeling": Ella Frears & Richard Scott
- 74 (Summer) – "Work": Benedict Newbery & Pauline Sewards
- 75 (Autumn) – "Loss": Yvonne Reddick & Adam Lowe

=== 2020 ===
- 76 (Spring) – "Resistencia": Leo Boix & Nathalie Teitler
- 77 (Summer) – "Act Your Age": Gboyega Odubanjo, Selina Rodrigues & Christine Webb
- 78 (Autumn) – "Collaborations": David Floyd & Alice Willitts

=== 2021 ===
- 79 (Spring) – "Dwelling": Zoë Brigley, Kristian Evans & Rob A. Mackenzie
- 80 (Summer) – "Avatars": Petra Kamula, Golnoosh Nour & Richard Skinner
- 81 (Autumn) – "Anthropocene": Maya Chowdhry, Cheryl Moskowitz & Yvonne Reddick

=== 2022 ===
- 82 (Spring) – "Obsidian": Nick Makoha, Gboyega Odubanjo & Zakia Carpenter-Hall
- 83 (Summer) – "Solitude": Isabelle Baafi, Ilya Kaminsky & Lisa Kelly
- 84 (Winter) – "Physics": Susannah Hart and Stav Poleg

=== 2023 ===
- 85 (Spring) – "Poems for schools": Ashley Hickson-Lovence, Laurie Smith & Gill Ward
- 86 (Summer) – "Food": Ella Frears & Sean Wai Keung
- 87 (Autumn) – "Islands": Niall Campbell, Fiona Moore & Safiya Kamaria Kinshasa

=== 2024 ===
- 88 (Spring) – "Underworld": Leo Boix, Ella Duffy & Kate Simpson
- 89 (Summer) – "Performance": Mariam Chaudhri, David Floyd & Josiane Smith
- 90 (Autumn) – "Grassroots": Lisa Kelly & Patrizia Longhitano

=== 2025 ===
- 91 (Spring) – "In the Flesh": Aoife Lyall & Victoria Kennefick
- 92 (Summer) – "Ownership": Paul Stephenson, Kathy Pimlott & Danne Jobin
- 93 (Autumn) – "The Liberation Issue": Isabelle Baafi, Sohini Basak & Tim Tim Cheng

=== 2026^{α} ===
- 94 (Spring) – "REMIX": Elontra Hall, Willie Lee Kinard III & Lola Oh
- 95 (Summer) – "Architecture": Leo Boix & Stav Poleg
- 96 – "The Antarctic": Cheryl Moskowitz, Elizabeth Lewis Williams & Branwell Roberts

=== 2027 ===
- 97 – "Diasporic Dialogues": Zakia Carpenter-Hall, Elontra Hall, and Nick Makoha

Magma is often applauded for a unique approach of having "different editors for each issue." It is also known for the blog posts, and for the interviews, and the team organise launch events for the issues.

== Team ==
The current Chair of Magma is the poet Lisa Kelly, who also edited "The Deaf Issue" with the poet Raymond Antrobus. Julia Bird, who edited two issues for the magazine, is one of the previous members on the board, alongside Gboyega Odubanjo. It now also includes, among others, Susannah Hart, Paul Stephenson, and Cheryl Moskowitz, who also edited the "Anthropocene" issue with Yvonne Reddick and Maya Chowdhry. As the reviews editor for the magazine, Aoife Lyall replaced Rob A. Mackenzie, who had been in the position for over ten years.

== Notes ==
1.^αAs of 7 July 2026, the 95th issue of Magma was the latest release, and a newer submission call, for "Diasporic Dialogues" (97), had been announced earlier the same month, with the deadline as the 31st of July. The submission call for Magma 95 – "Architecture" was launched early in November 2025, with submissions closing on the 10th of December.
