= Afshan d'souza-lodhi =

British Indian–Pakistani writer

afshan d'souza-lodhi
- Born: c. 1992; Dubai
- Occupations: Writer, poet, playwright
- Writing career
- Period: 2009–
- Genres: Poetry, plays, fiction, film, radio, short story, journalism
- Subjects: South Asians in the United Kingdom, Muslim women, LGBTQ people and Islam, Desi, Islam, , immigrants, women
- Notable works: "Chop Chop", [re:desire], Santi & Naz (written with Guleraana Mir)
- Website: afshandl.com

afshan d’souza-lodhi is a Muslim writer of Indian and Pakistani heritage, born in Dubai and raised in Manchester, England. She primarily writes poetry and plays. She has received the Royal National Theatre's Peter Shaffer award, and a TV pilot based on her radio play "Chop Chop" was selected for the #MuslimList. Her first collection, [re:desire] (Burning Eye Books, 2020), was longlisted for the Jhalak Prize. Her 2020 play Santi & Naz (co-written with Guleraana Mir) was the recipient of the Fringe Society's Keep It Fringe Fund and won the Charlie Hartill Fund 2023.

== Career ==
afshan d'souza-lodhi studied philosophy, and later completed a master's degree in postcolonial literature and culture. In 2009, she took part in the Search Party, a scheme for young Muslim writers, at the Royal Exchange Theatre.

In 2012, d'souza-lodhi and poet Adam Lowe founded Young Enigma to support LGBTQ+ writers. She was a BAFTA BFI Flare mentee and was also admitted to the Warner Bros Discovery Writers Access programme. She was also the first writer-in-residence for Bluebird Pictures. She is one of 10 emerging writers on the National Centre for Writing's ILX 10 list.

d'souza-lodhi has had residencies at the Royal Exchange Theatre and Manchester Literature Festival, and has worked with Eclipse Theatre and Tamasha Theatre Company. She wrote and directed a short film ("An Act of Terror") for Channel 4 and a radio play ("Chop Chop") for BBC Sounds, which was later adapted as a TV pilot and selected for the #MuslimList.

In 2015, d'souza-lodhi's play "The Lesborrist Tapes" (written under the pseudonym Tara Ali Din) was published in SPOKE: New Queer Voices (Dog Horn Publishing, 2013), edited by Adam Lowe. The anthology was launched at an event with Andrew McMillan, Cheddar Gorgeous and Anna Phylactic. She has also performed at Paul Burston's Polari Literary Salon.

In 2019, d'souza-lodhi wrote the essay "Hijabi (R)evolution", which was published in an anthology of essays by Muslim women writers, It's Not About the Burqa, edited by Mariam Khan (Picador, 2020). She also attended the 2019 Poetry Week of Barcelona with poet Jay Bernard as part of Speaking Volumes.

In 2020, d'souza-lodhi joined five other artists as part of The Hack Theatre's Unmute project. Funded as part of Arts Council England's Emergency Response Fund following the COVID-19 pandemic, Unmute commissioned the six artists to make films exploring barriers to inclusivity in the arts. As part of the project, she created the short film "Are We", which adapted the poem "I Come From" by Dean Atta. She also co-wrote the play Santi & Naz with Guleraana Mir. The play—about two best friends, a Sikh girl and a Muslim girl, soon to be divided by the Partition of India—was the recipient of the Fringe Society's Keep It Fringe Fund and the Charlie Hartill Fund 2023, and won a Vault Festival Origins Award 2020.

=== Community work ===
d'souza-lodhi sits on the boards of Manchester Literature Festival and Pie Radio. She is also on the steering committee for the Northern Police Monitoring Project—an independent organisation which campaigns for an end to police harassment and violence.

=== Themes ===
d'souza-lodhi often writes about South Asian and Muslim women. Her play Santi & Naz (The Vault, 2020) explores the Indo-Pakistani Partition from the perspective of two women divided by the formation of the two countries. Her radio play "Chop Chop" (BBC Sounds, 2019), later adapted as a TV pilot, is about a halal butcher's shop run by Muslim women.

d'souza-lodhi's short play "The Lesborrist Tapes" was performed in 2013 and later published in SPOKE: New Queer Writing, edited by Adam Lowe (Dog Horn Publishing, 2015), before being adapted into the Channel 4-commissioned short film, "An Act of Terror" (2018). It is the satirical tale of a lesbian terrorist who attacks Western culture through her sexuality and religion, set in the context of the war on terror. In 2019, d'souza-lodhi contributed the essay "Hijabi (R)evolution" to the anthology It's Not About the Burqa (Picador), in which she explores the importance of the hijab and Islam to her as a young queer Muslim in the UK.

According to d'souza-lodhi, her 2020 debut poetry collection, [re:desire], "seeks to investigate the yearning to love, be loved and belong" from a Desi (South Asian) perspective.

== Reception ==
In their interview with d'souza-lodhi and poet Jay Bernard, Elisabeth Massana and Cristina Alsina Rísquez say the playwright's early play "The Lesborrist Tapes" (later adapted for TV as "An Act of Terror" on Channel 4) successfully "dismantles the trope of the Muslim terrorist against the idea of sexually terrorizing the West and explores the relationship between capitalism, patriarchy, religion and sexuality in the context of the war on terror".

A five-star review by Rosie Doyle of Voice Magazine said the playwright "satirically dissects deeply rooted misogyny" in her radio play "Chop Chop". The play follows the all-female owners of a halal butcher's shop who get their revenge on those who have wronged them.

In her review of d'souza-lodhi's 2020 debut poetry collection, [re:desire], Tabatha Leggett said that the poet draws on multiple linguistic traditions in her poetry. Actor Shobna Gulati said the collection was "witty, beautiful and poignant, showing us language has no boundaries". Poet Dean Atta said it was "an evocative collection of painful and beautiful multilingual poems in which silences are broken, sexuality is uncertain, and love is a bloody mess".

Writing for Stagedoor, Lyn Gardner reviewed an early version of the play Santi & Naz (written with Guleraana Mir). She described it as "a gorgeous little sliver of a play", and said that beneath "this modest story is another one about the way individual stories and personal herstories are subsumed into the big political and social events that make the history books". In her review for Love London Love Culture, Emma Clarendon said the play was "as enjoyable as it is heartbreaking to watch". A four-star review by Jonathan Evans in The Spy in the Stalls said the play was "deceptively innocent and poetic", and that in the writing "Innocence and playfulness mingle with a satire that bites when we least expect it". In another four-star review, Raphael Kohn said the play was "fantastically feminist" and "Full of heart".

== Works ==
=== Anthologies ===
- My Dear Watson: The Very Elements in Poetry (Beautiful Dragon Press, 2015)
- SPOKE: New Queer Voices. Edited by Adam Lowe (Manchester: Dog Horn Publishing, 2015)
- Elevator Fiction (Manchester: Commonword, 2016) (as editor and contributor)
- sounds that exceed 80 decibels (Manchester: Commonword, 2017)
- It's Not About The Burqa, edited by Mariam Khan (London: Picador, 2019)
- Match Made in Heaven (London: Hope Road Publishing, 2020)
- Not Quite Right For Us (London: flipped eye, 2021)
- Tell Me Who We Were Before Life Made Us (3 Cups Press, 2021)

=== Plays ===
- "Teacups", performed by Shobna Gulati and directed by Kate Colgrove-Pope (Royal Exchange Theatre/Come Closer Monologues for King Lear, April 2016)
- "The Lesborrist Tapes" (writing as Tara Ali Din), produced by Adam Lowe (Roundhouse Radio, Manchester, Edinburgh, February 2013 – August 2015)
- "Round the Fire" (West Yorkshire Playhouse/Furnace, June 2016)
- "The Promised Land", (Southbank Centre/International Poetry Festival, Camden People's Theatre, Bolton Octagon, and 3MT, June 2015 to June 2016)
- "Part It Part Not", performed by Shakera Ahad; directed by Amy Hailwood (Royal Exchange Theatre/Memories of Partition Exhibition, September 2017)
- "Meatz R Uz" (Tamasha Theatre Company/RichMix, September 2017)
- "Assembly Women", based on the Greek play Assembly Women; directed by Natalie Diddams (Theatre in the Mill/Women's Comedy Workshops, March 2018)
- "Chop Chop", performed by Sharma Walfall, Shobna Gulati, Carla Henry, Murray Taylor and Sushil Chudasama (BBC Arts/New Creatives, October 2019)
- Santi & Naz, co-written with Guleraana Mir, produced by The Thelmas (Vault Festival, January 2020; published by Bloomsbury, 2025)
- Run(a)way, directed by Gitika Bhutto and performed by Amina Zia and Ashling O’Shea (Young Vic/5 Plays Online, February 2021)
- "How to Eat a Mango" (Georgetown University/ACLS Philadelphia, Screening Scholarship Media Festival CAMRA/University of Pennsylvania, March/April 2021)

=== Poetry ===
- [re:desire] (Burning Eye Books, 2020)

=== Television ===
- "An Act of Terror", produced by True North (Random Acts North/Channel 4, 2018)
