= Hardy's Well =

Former pub in Manchester, England (c. 1837–2023)

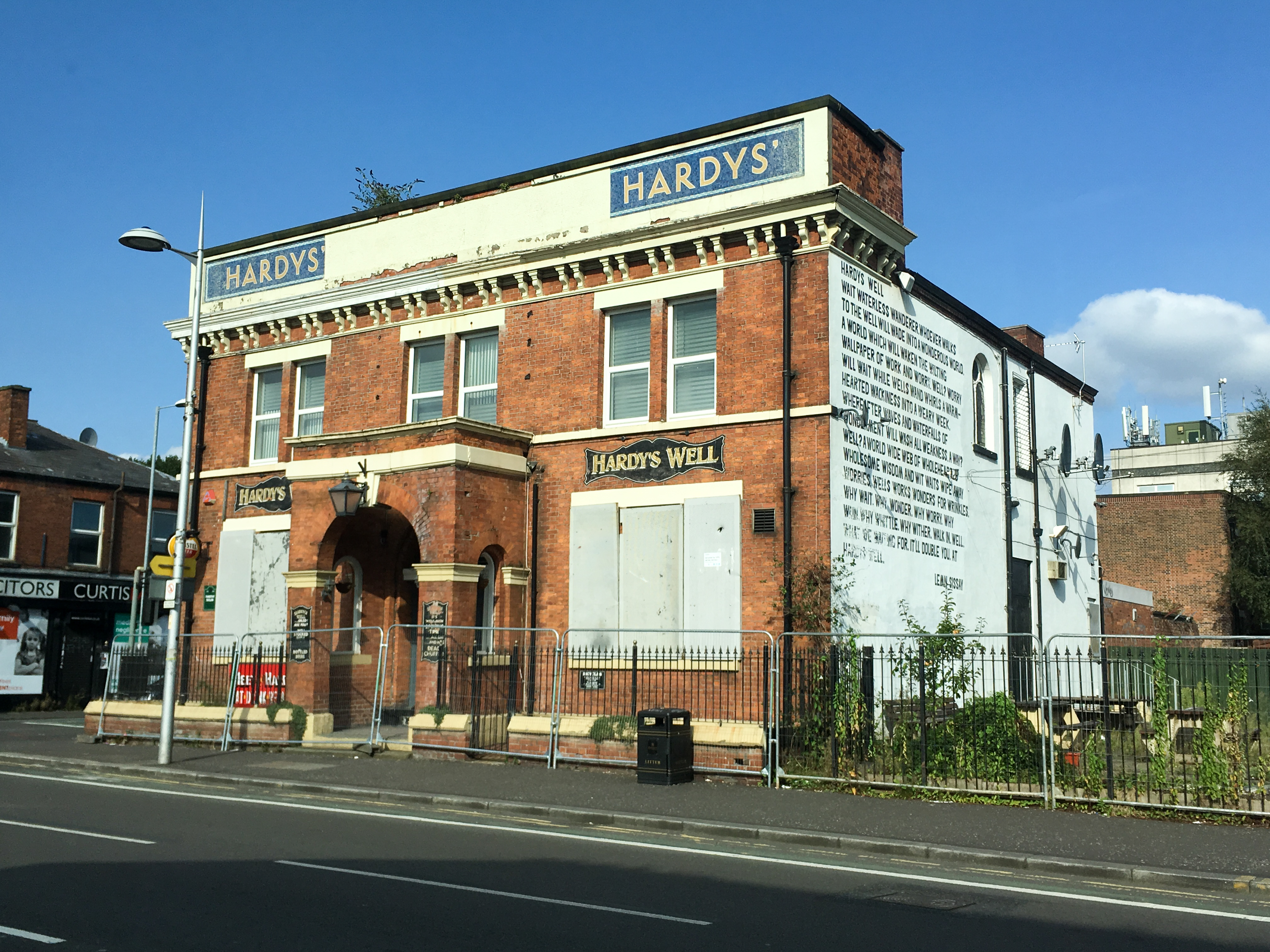
- The former pub in 2016

- Location within Greater Manchester
- Former names: Birch Villa; Birch Villa Hotel

General information
- Status: Demolished
- Type: Public house
- Location: Wilmslow Road, Rusholme, Manchester, England
- Coordinates: 53°27′07″N 2°13′19″W
- Opened: c. 1837; 189 years ago
- Closed: 2016
- Demolished: 2023; 3 years ago
- Client: Hardy's Brewery
- Owner: Enterprise Inns (former)

Technical details
- Material: Red brick

Hardy's Well was a public house on Wilmslow Road in Rusholme, an area of Manchester, England. Established around 1837 as the Birch Villa, later the Birch Villa Hotel, it was renamed Hardy's Well in the late 20th century after Hardy's Brewery. The pub became a popular venue for students and football supporters, and in 1994 its south gable wall was used for a poem by Lemn Sissay. It closed in 2016 and remained derelict until 2023, when it was damaged by an arson attack and subsequently demolished.

== History ==
Hardy's Well was a public house at 257 Wilmslow Road, on the corner of Dickenson Road in Rusholme, south Manchester, close to Platt Fields Park and the Curry Mile. The building was named after Hardy's Brewery and was previously known as Birch Villa, later the Birch Villa Hotel, which existed on the site since 1837.

It was a popular venue for University of Manchester students and for Manchester City F.C. supporters when the club was based at Maine Road.

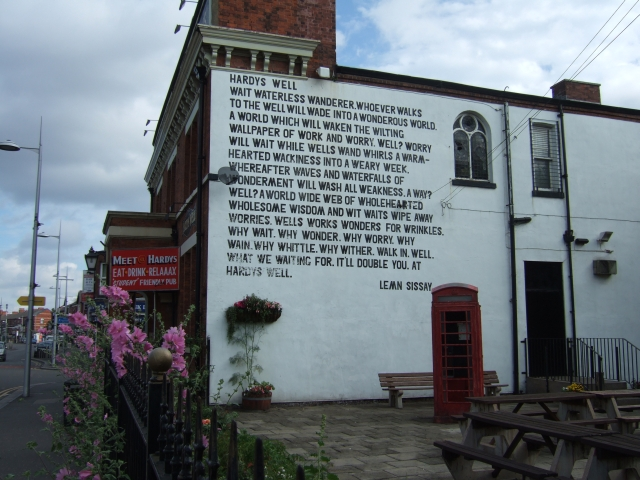
Lemn Sissay's poem on the side of the pub

In 1994 the landlord and landlady Andy Pye and Melanie Pemberton made an agreement with poet Lemn Sissay to have his poem "Hardy's Well" painted on the exterior south gable wall of the building as a piece of public art.

The pub was owned by Enterprise Inns and was listed as an asset of community value in 2015 following an application by the Rusholme and Fallowfield Civic Society. It closed in July 2016 and was considered at risk of demolition. In 2018 Eamar Developments submitted a planning application to convert the building into flats and shops, retaining the shell of the pub within a larger structure and incorporating the poem on the wall into the foyer, with a replica on the new building's exterior. The proposed development would have been six storeys tall, and contained 62 flats, with shops at ground level. The application was withdrawn in June 2021.

=== Demolition ===
On 25 May 2023, following an arson attack and fire at the site, Manchester City Council condemned the building on the grounds that the structure was unstable and posed risks to pedestrians and the surrounding area. An emergency demolition notice was issued to the owner, and contractors were instructed to demolish the pub. Demolition took place on 26 May 2023. As of 2025, Google Street View imagery shows the site remaining an open, undeveloped plot, currently functioning as a surface‑level car park.

== Architecture ==
The pub was a red-brick building with two storeys and three bays. It was topped by a parapet on three sides, decorated with blue and gold mosaic-tiled signage bearing the name "Birch Villa" and the Hardy's Brewery name. When the pub was renamed Hardy's Well in the late 20th century, the "Birch Villa" inscription was painted over, leaving only the Hardy's name visible.
