= Modron (disambiguation) =

Modron is a figure in Welsh mythology.

Modron may also refer to:

- Modron Magazine, Welsh poetry magazine
- Modron (Dungeons & Dragons), a type of fictional being in a game
- Modron (Judges Guild), an adventure scenario for role-playing games

== See also ==
- Madron, village in Cornwall
- Modrone, location in Italy
