= Poetry Wales =

Welsh poetry magazine

- Winter 2014 cover
- Editor: Zoë Brigley
- Former editors: Meic Stephens (1965-1973); Sam Adams (1973-1975); John Powell Ward (1975-1980); Cary Archard (1980-1986); Mike Jenkins (1986-1992); Richard Poole (1992-1996); Robert Minhinnick (1997-2008); Zoe Skoulding (2008-2014); Nia Davies (2014-2019); Jonathan Edwards (2019-2021)
- Categories: Poetry
- Frequency: Triannually
- Publisher: Seren
- Founder: Meic Stephens
- First issue: Spring 1965
- Country: Wales
- Based in: Bridgend
- Language: English
- Website: www.poetrywales.co.uk

Poetry Wales is a triannual poetry magazine published in Bridgend, Wales. Founded by Meic Stephens and now published by Seren, it is edited by Zoë Brigley. Since its first publication in 1965, the magazine has built an international reputation for excellent poems, features and reviews from Wales and beyond. The magazine is published in print and online.

== History ==
Poetry Wales was founded by Meic Stephens in 1965, and has since been edited by Sam Adams, John Powell Ward, Cary Archard, Mike Jenkins, Richard Poole, Robert Minhinnick, Zoë Skoulding, Nia Davies and Jonathan Edwards. In August 2021, the magazine appointed its first ever joint editors in Zoë Brigley and Marvin Thompson. However, Thompson stepped down from the role three weeks later. Since then, Brigley has introduced a scheme where a series of contributing editors join the magazine for a couple of issues, including Vicky Morris, Isabelle Baafi, Hannah Hodgson, Taylor Edmonds, Tangie Mitchell, and Grug Muse. George Sandifer-Smith also became Reviews Editor in 2022.

Former guest editors of individual issues include Deryn Rees-Jones, Stephen Knight, Gwyneth Lewis, Paul Henry and Duncan Bush.

Former editor Cary Archard also founded Poetry Wales Press, which now trades under the name Seren Books.

Poetry Wales is supported by Swansea University and has a Creative Partnership with Aberystwyth University's Institute of Literature, Languages and Creative Arts. Along with two other literary magazines in Wales, New Welsh Review and Planet, Poetry Wales receives funding from the Welsh Books Council.

== Recent issues ==
Poetry Wales has published 212 issues and counting of its magazine. The magazine is published in yearly volumes, previously over 4 seasonal issues, and now over 3 issues published in Winter, Spring and Summer.

Issue	Publication Date	Editor	Contributors
59.3	Spring 2024	Zoë Brigley	Conversations Across Borders: Home in a Time of Ecological Emergency with Ariana Benson, Tangie Mitchell & Taylor Edmonds; A Selection of Poems Chosen by Taylor Edmonds; How It Feels on My Skin: A Conversation Between L. Kiew & Khairani Barokka; A Selection of Poems Chosen by Tangie Mitchell; 'Not Alone in Loss... Simply Lonely': Meditations on Poetry & the Possibility (Or Not) of Human Rights; Duos: Jo Bratten & Sekhar Banerjee
59.2	Winter 2023	Zoë Brigley	Doctor & Magician: A Tribute to Dannie Abse on the Centenary of His Birth | read the full feature here; An Interview with Lynne Hjelmgaard & Penelope Shuttle; Translations of Fabio Morábito by Richard Gwyn; Just Your Imagination: Christodoulos Makris investigates the case of the ~~absent~~ elusive Irish avant-garde; Tangie Mitchell: A Poetry Workshop on Nightlife, Love and (Be)Longing; Wales Poetry Award Winners; Duos: Virgil Suárez & Jo Mazelis
59.1	Summer 2023	Zoë Brigley	On Value, Pay and Problems of Capitalism: Poets Talk About the Challenges of Economic Stress; In Such Timelessness: Robert Minhinnick Presents Unpublished Poems by Duncan Bush; Words and Images from the South Wales Valleys; Cultivating the Strange: A Poetry Workshop on Using Surprise by John McCullough; Duos: Poems in Conversation: Andrea Witzke Slot and Srivinas Mandavilli
58.3	Spring 2023	Zoë Brigley and Grug Muse	A Translation of Menna Elfyn's 'Mercy' by Emma Baines; A Selection of Poems Selected by Grug Muse; Conversations Across Borders: Nia Morais & Gwen Nell Westerman Discuss Language; Extracts from a Sequence of Latin American Sonnets by Leo Boix; Iestyn Tyne: A Creative Writing Workshop Inspired by T.H. Parry-Williams; Duos: Poems in Conversations
58.2	Winter 2022	Zoë Brigley and Taylor Edmonds	Durre Shawar: The Language of Our Stories; A selection of poems edited by Taylor Edmonds; Conversations Across Borders: Nadia Sarwar-Skuse & Sampurna Chattarji; Propping Open the Door: Taylor Edmonds interviews Hanan Issa, National Poet of Wales; Creative Writing Workshop: Nick Makoha on Listening
58.1	Summer 2022	Zoë Brigley, Hannah Hodgson and Taylor Edmonds Reviews Editor: George Sandifer-Smith	The Lyric is not Sufficient: The editors of 58.1 talk with The Cyborg Jillian Weise; Gwyneth Lewis: Time in Health and Poetry: Chronic illness in art and the body; Bethany Pope: A Tribute to Grant Tarbard; Shalini Sengupta: If a Body Falls Out of the Job Market; Hannah Hodgson: A Creative Writing Workshop on Navigating the Body
57.3	Spring 2022	Zoë Brigley and Hannah Hodgson	Jenny Mitchell: How Being a Girl Poet Saved My Life, Graham Hartil and Phil Maillard on the Legacy of Chris Torrance, Kim Moore on Poetry and Intimate Partner Violence, Felicia Rose Chavez: Writing Workshop Facing Our Fear.
57.2	Winter 2021	Zoë Brigley Reviews Editor: Isabelle Baafi	John Kinsella: Copying, Imitation, But Not Reproduction, Poems Selected by Isabelle Baafi, The Anti-racist Writing Workshop with Felicia Rose Chavez: Social Justice Writing & Teaching Resources3, A Selection of New Poems by Welsh Writers, Kristian Evans: Writing Workshop: Writing the 'More-than-human', Ledbury Poetry Critics Review Special.
57.1	Summer 2021	Zoë Brigley and Vicky Morris	Features: Poets on Sport, April Yee Interviews Rowan Ricardo Phillips, Cris Paul: Disruptions, Iconoclasts, and Futurists, Wales Poetry Award Winners, Kate Clanchy in Conversationwith Vicky Morris, Vicky Morris: Reading the Child Self, Hannah Lowe: Writing the Child Self.
56.3	Spring 2021	Jonathan Edwards	Features: Zoë Brigley, Kristian Evans, Robert Minhinnick, Philip Gross, Cyril Jones, Valerie Coffin Price, Carl Griffin, Hilary Watson, Seàn Hewitt, Phil Jones Reviews: April Yee, Stephen Payne, Rhys Owain Williams, Zoë Wells Poems: Sheenagh Pugh, Hilary Watson, April Yee, Stephen Payne, Philip Gross, Graham Mort, Sascha Aurora Akhtar, Nicholas McGaughey, Matthew Haigh, Shauna Robertson, Harriet Truscott, Tracey Rhys, Zoe Wells, Katherine Stockton, Zoe Brigley, Seán Hewitt, Estelle Price, Fiona Benson, Edward Lee, Daisy Henwood, Kath Osgerby, Archie Capon, Rhys Owain Williams, Phil Jones, Jeanette Burton, Taz Rahman, Sarah Salway, Laura Seymour, Rae Howells, Kristian Evans, Samantha Wynne-Rhydderch, Joanna Ingham, Rebecca Farmer, Alycia Pirmohamed, Robert Walton, Jeremy Hooker, Amelia Eilersten, Jane Draycott, Judy Brown, Christopher Horton, Juliet Antill, Jennie Farley, Peter Carpenter, Robert Minhinnick, Carl Griffin, Valerie Coffin Price, Cyril Jones
56.2	Winter 2020	Jonathan Edwards	Features: Andrew McMillan, Tiffany Atkinson Poems: Seán Hewitt, Tiffany Atkinson, Hannah Lowe, Alice Miller, Khairani Barokka, Carole Bromley, John McCullough, Penelope Shuttle, Jo Morris Dixon, Sarah Barnsley, Rae Howells, Josephine Corcoran, Merrie Joy Williams, Rishi Dastidar, Caleb Parkin, Damian Walford Davies, Abeer Ameer, John Freeman, James Giddings, Richie McCaffery, Amy Acre, Matt Nunn, David Hughes, Alan Gillis, Tamar Yoseloff, Amanda Rackstraw, Ranjit Hoskote, David Hawkins, Philip Williams, Paul Stephenson, Jeremy Page, Jane Bonnyman, Andrew McMillan, Jessica Mookherjee, Ailbhe Darcy, Cris Paul, Dai George, Katrina Naomi, Ben Ray, Ross Cogan, Peter Carpenter
56.1	Summer 2020	Jonathan Edwards	Features: Moniza Alvi, Samantha Wynne-Rhydderch Gareth Prior, Jeni Williams, John Gower, Cris Paul Reviews: Dai George, John Greening, Kirsten Irving, P.C. Evans Poems: Samantha Wynne-Rhydderch, Gareth Prior, Jeni Williams, Jon Gower, Moniza Alvi, Cris Paul, Nerys Williams, David Clarke, David Morley, Anna Woodford, Huw Jones, Llŷr Lewis, Joanna Ingham, Michael McKimm, Helen Tookey, Jannat Ahmed, Mari Ellis Dunning, Michael Arnold Williams, Tishani Doshi, Philip Gross, David Briggs, Carrie Etter, Nicholas McGaughey, Gareth Writer-Davies, Bryony Littlefair, Sampurna Chattarji, Luke Samuel Yates, Jon Stone, Kathy Miles, Benjamin Palmer, Ifor Thomas, Rob Miles, Paul Henry
55.3	Spring 2020	Jonathan Edwards	Features: Marvin Thompson, Di Slaney, Adam Sillman and Rhys Owain Williams Poems: John Freeman, Di Slaney, Joe Dunthorne, Annie Brechin, Ben Bransfield, Ben Rogers, Nerys Williams, Dai George, Abeer Ameer, Kerry Hardie, Alan Perry, Leo Temple, Elizabeth Porter, Jan Harris, Rhian Edwards, Susie Wild, Daniel Sluman, Rhiannon Hooson, Jill Munro, Stephen Payne, Taylor Edmonds, Richard Georges, Lauren Pope, Bethany Pope, Michael Loveday, Katrina Naomi, Peter Knaggs, Zillah Bowes, Jodie Hollander, Paul Stephenson, Kathy Miles, Tony Curtis, Zoë Wells
55.2	January 2020	Jonathan Edwards	Features: Gillian Clarke, Paul Henry, Arjunan Manuelpillai, David Greenslade, Wendy Pratt Reviews: Kate Noakes, David Clarke, Anna Lewis, Steve Whitaker Poems: Gillian Clarke, Osi Rhys Osmond, Stephen Knight, Vicky Morris, Jessica Mookherjee, Marvin Thompson, Liz Lefroy, Emily Blewitt, clare e. potter, Patrick Jones, Phil Jones, Arjunan Manuelpillai, Di Slaney, Matthew Jarvis, Rhea Seren Phillips, David Rees Davies, Joe Dunthorne, Matthew Caley, David Clarke, Emily Cotterill, Shauna Robertson, Christopher Meredith, Emma Simon, Wendy Pratt, Neetha Kunaratnam, Rhian Edwards, Linda Saunders, John Freeman
55.1	Summer 2019	Nia Davies	Features: James Goodwin; Catrin Menai and Rhys Trimble; Rhea Seren Phillips, Alonso Quesda translated and introduced by Daniel Eltringham; Paul Kaye, Wioletta Greg and Antonia Lloyd-Jones; From the Archive: Meirion Pennar Reviews: Siofra McSherry, Jonathan Edwards, Jazmine Linklater, Gareth Prior, Ellen Bell, Rhys Trimble Poems: Gloria Dawson, Verity Spott, Lucy Mercer, Harry Josephine Giles, Stephen Emmerson, Virna Teixeira trans. Shelley Bhoil, David Asherford, Paul Stephenson, Catrin Menai, Charles Wilkinson, Tara Skurtu, Efe Duyan trans. Neil Doherty & Tara Skurtu, Wioletta Greg trans. Paul Kaye, Ghazal Mosadeq, Meirion Pennar trans. Rhys Trimble
54.3	Spring 2019	Nia Davies	Features: Sarah Hudis, So Mayer, Dai George, Gareth Leaman Reviews: Gareth Leaman, Maryam Hessavi, Rhys Trimble, Rhian Barfoot, Maggie Harries, Jade Cuttle Poems: Azad Ashim Sharma, Maria Jastrzębska, Hanan Issa, Lee Duggan, Iris Colomb, Alison Gibb, Sarah Kelly, James Byrne, Huw Lawrence, Prue Chamberlayne, Rhian Elizabeth, John McCullough, Andrew Wells, Jonathan Edwards, Peter Hughes, Michael Farrell
54.2	Autumn 2018	Nia Davies	Features: Nerys Williams, Anna Reckin, Richard Gwyn, Marianna Burton, Robert Minhinnick Reviews: Gareth Farmer, Daryl Leeworthy, Ellen Bell, Maryam Hessavi, Jazmine Linklater, Elz'bieta Wójcik-Leese. Poems: Sascha Aurora Ahktar, Jazmine Linklater, Stewart Sanderson, Ifor Ap Glyn, Chloe Garner, Sian Melangell Dafydd, Simon Mundy, Sarah Marina, Andrew Spragg, Joe Dunthorne, Rose Knapp, Mike Jenkins, John White, Rosemary Corlett, David O'Hanlon, Eleanor Rees, Maitreyabandhu, Dan O'Brien, Fiona Cameron, Owen Lewis, Nerys Williams, James Stradner, Robert Sheppard.

== Wales Poetry Award ==
In August 2019, Poetry Wales launched its annual international poetry competition Wales Poetry Award, sponsored by Aberystwyth University. The competition is open to all poets aged 17+ and accepts English language poetry up to 70 lines. Its inaugural award winners were announced at Seren Cardiff Poetry Festival in February 2020, with Leo Temple taking first prize for 'Towards a Bucolics of Contactless: a particular poem'.

Year	Winner	Title of Poem	Judge
2019	Leo Temple	Towards a Bucolics of Contactless: a particular poem	Katherine Stansfield
2020	Maggie Harris	and the thing is	Pascale Petit
2021	David Walrond	Cardiff, Summer 1976	Samantha Wynne-Rhydderch
2022	Kathryn Bevis	Translations of Grief	Gwyneth Lewis
2023	tba	tba	Denise Saul

== See also ==
- List of literary magazines
