= Modron Magazine =

Wales-based online poetry magazine

MODRON
- Editor: Zoë Brigley; Kristian Evans; Taz Rahman; Siân Melangell Dafydd; Glyn F. Edwards
- Staff writers: Sarah Bitter
- Categories: Poetry
- Founder: Zoë Brigley; Kristian Evans
- First issue: October 2022; 3 years ago
- Country: Wales
- Language: English; Welsh
- Website: modronmagazine.com

Modron (stylised as MODRON) is a Wales-based online literary magazine which published its first issue in 2022. It received particular focus when Abeer Ameer's poem "At least", first published in the magazine, was shortlisted for the 2025 Forward Prize for Best Single Poem – Written.

== About ==
Modron was founded by Kristian Evans and Zoë Brigley, who also edits Poetry Wales, and has received support from the Books Council of Wales as Wales's first online environmentally-themed magazine. Both Brigley and Evans serve as editors alongside Taz Rahman, Siân Melangell Dafydd, and Glyn F. Edwards, and staff writer Sarah Bitter. The magazine publishes work in both English and Welsh, with Dafydd serving as the Welsh-language editor.

Modron publishes nature poems "that explore the more-than-human", and writers including Pascale Petit, Jayant Kashyap, Deryn Rees-Jones, and Penelope Shuttle have appeared in its issues.

They also worked with the Poetry School to present their Earth Day 2024 feature.

=== The Forward Prize ===
In 2025, it was announced that Abeer Ameer's poem "At least", first published in Modron, was shortlisted for the Forward Prize for Best Single Poem in written form alongside four other poems. The poem, which was praised for its "devastating" meditation on loss and for exposing the media's approach to news through "duplicity of language", went on to win in the said category.
