= Malika Booker =

British poet and multi-disciplinary artist (born 1970)

Malika Booker FRSL
- Booker in 2020
- Born: 1970 (age 55–56); London, UK
- Education: Goldsmiths, University of London (BSc, MA)
- Occupations: Poet and artist
- Employer(s): Leeds University; Manchester Metropolitan University
- Awards: Cholmondeley Award (2019); Forward Prize for Poetry (2020, 2023)
- Website: malikabooker.com

Malika Booker FRSL (born 1970) is a British writer, poet and multi-disciplinary artist, who is "a pioneer of the present spoken word movement" in the UK. Her writing spans different genres of storytelling, including poetry, theatre, monologue, installation and education, and her work has appeared widely in journals and anthologies. Organizations for which she has worked include Arts Council England, the BBC, British Council, Wellcome Trust, National Theatre, Royal Shakespeare Company, Arvon, and Hampton Court Palace.

== Early life and education ==
Malika Booker was born in London, UK, to Guyanese and Grenadian parents. She grew up in Georgetown, Guyana, and returned to the UK aged 13, with her parents.

Booker began writing and performing poetry while studying a bachelors degree in anthropology at Goldsmiths, University of London. She graduated in 1992. She studied a master's degree in Creative Writing and Life Writing at her alma mater, graduating in 2003. She was mentored by Kwame Dawes, W. N. Herbert and Mimi Khalvati.

== Career ==
Booker founded the poetry collective Malika's Kitchen in 2001, which also included Nick Makoha. She took part in The Complete Works mentoring programme. Her first collection of poetry, Pepper Seed, was published by Peepal Tree Press in 2013 and was shortlisted for the Seamus Heaney Centre prize for best first full collection published in the UK and Ireland. Booker was the inaugural Poet In Residence at the Royal Shakespeare Company in Stratford-upon-Avon.

Booker's poem "Nine Nights", first published in The Poetry Review in autumn 2016, was shortlisted for Best Single Poem in the 2017 Forward Prize.

In 2019, Booker served as Chair of Judges for the international Manchester Poetry Prize.

Booker has written for radio and for the stage, and her work has appeared in journals and anthologies including Bittersweet: Contemporary Black Women’s Poetry (1998), The India International Journal (2005), Ten New Poets (2010), Out of Bounds, Black & Asian Poets (2012), and New Daughters of Africa (2019). Her Her first theatre show Absolution (1999) was commissioned by the Austrian Cultural Institute, Apples and Snakes and Battersea Arts Centre.

Booker works as a Creative Writing lecturer at Manchester Metropolitan University.

== Awards ==
In 2019, Booker received a Cholmondeley Award for her outstanding contribution to poetry.

In 2020, Booker won the Forward Prize for "Best Single Poem – Written" for "The Little Miracles", published in Magma. The poem is about caring for her mother in the aftermath of a stroke. In 2023, she won that prize for that category again, which made her the first woman to win that prize for that category twice. Her 2023 win was for a poem called “Libation”, which the Poetry Review first published. The poem is about the ritual of a drink being poured in honour of the dead at funerals.

Booker was elected a Fellow of the Royal Society of Literature in 2022.

== Selected works ==
- 1998: Bittersweet: Contemporary Black Women's Poetry. Ed. Karen McCarthy (The Women's Press)
- 2000: IC3: The Penguin Anthology of New Black Writing. Eds Courttia Newland and Kadija Sesay (Penguin)
- 2004: KIN: Commemorative Tour Anthology (Renaissance One)
- 2004: The Way We See It, The Way It Is (Lynk Reach)
- 2007: Breadfruit (flipped eye publishing). ISBN 9781905233175
- 2010: Ten New Poets (Bloodaxe)
- 2012: Hidden Gems Volume Two: Contemporary Black British Plays. Ed. Deirdre Osborne (Oberon Books). ISBN 1849436983
- 2013: Pepper Seed (Peepal Tree Press), ISBN 9781845232115
- 2017: Penguin Modern Poets 3: Your Family, Your Body by Malika Booker, Sharon Olds, Warsan Shire (Penguin). ISBN 0141984023
- 2019: New Daughters of Africa: An international anthology of writing by women of African descent. Ed. Margaret Busby (London:Myriad Editions).
