= Isabelle Baafi =

English writer and editor

- Baafi in 2022
- Born: London, England
- Education: University of Kent; University of Oxford
- Occupations: Writer and editor
- Notable work: Ripe (2020); Chaotic Good (2025)
- Awards: Somerset Maugham Award
- Website: isabellebaafi.com

Isabelle Baafi is an English writer and editor, noted for her poetry.

Her writing has appeared in various publications, including The Times Literary Supplement, The London Magazine, The Poetry Review, Oxford Poetry, and Magma Poetry. She is the reviews editor of Poetry London.

== Background ==
Baafi was born in London, England, and is of Jamaican and South African descent.

She studied at the University of Kent, where she received a Bachelor of Arts degree in comparative literature and film. She also earned a postgraduate degree in creative writing from the University of Oxford.

She was the winner of the 2019 Vincent Cooper Literary Prize, and was shortlisted for the 2019 Oxford Brookes International Poetry Competition, presented by the Oxford Brookes University.

Baafi's 2020 debut pamphlet, Ripe, won a Somerset Maugham Award and was the Poetry Book Society Pamphlet Choice for Spring 2021. Baafi was also shortlisted for the 2020 Bridport Prize and the 2021 Brunei International African Poetry Prize.

Baafi has served as a Ledbury poetry critic, an Obsidian Foundation Fellow, and a board member at Magma. In 2023, Baafi was the winner of the Winchester Poetry Prize (presented by the Winchester Poetry Festival held in Winchester) for her poem "The Path of Least Resilience".

Baafi's first poetry collection, Chaotic Good, published by Faber & Faber, won the 2025 Forward Prize for Best First Collection. It was also shortlisted for the 2025 T. S. Eliot Prize and selected as a Poetry Book Society Recommendation for summer 2025.

== Awards ==
- 2025: Forward Prize for Best First Collection, for Chaotic Good
- 2025: T. S. Eliot Prize (shortlisted), for Chaotic Good
- 2023: Winchester Poetry Prize for "The Path of Least Resilience"
- 2021: Somerset Maugham Award for Ripe
- 2021: Brunei International African Poetry Prize (shortlisted)
- 2020: Bridport Prize (shortlisted)
- 2019: Vincent Cooper Literary Prize
- 2019: Oxford Brookes International Poetry Competition (shortlisted)

== Publications ==
- Ripe (Ignition Press, 2020)
- Chaotic Good (Faber and Faber, 2025, ISBN 9780571390953)
