= Lemn Sissay =

British author and broadcaster (born 1967)

Lemn Sissay OBE FRSL
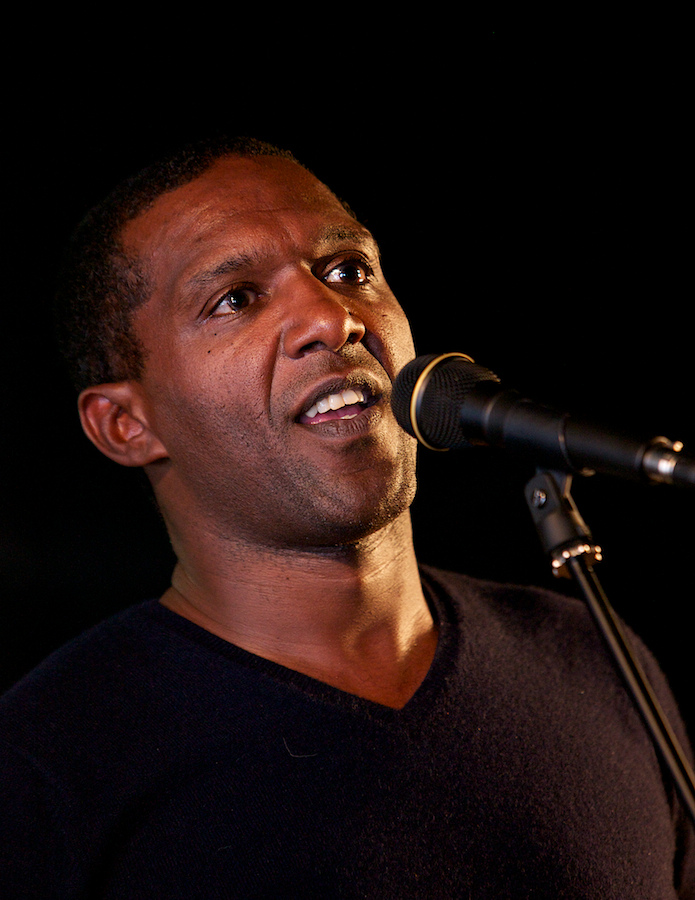
- Sissay speaking at the Hopemas Christmas party in 2010

Chancellor of the University of Manchester
- In office 1 August 2015 – 31 July 2022
- Preceded by: Tom Bloxham
- Succeeded by: Nazir Afzal

Personal details
- Born: 21 May 1967 (age 59) Higher End, Wigan, Lancashire, England, UK
- Occupation: Author, broadcaster, poet
- Website: lemnsissay.com

Lemn Sissay OBE FRSL (born 21 May 1967) is a British author and broadcaster. He was the official poet of the 2012 London Olympics, was chancellor of the University of Manchester from 2015 until 2022, and joined the Foundling Museum's board of trustees two years later, having previously been appointed one of the museum's fellows. He was awarded the 2019 PEN Pinter Prize. He has written a number of books and plays.

== Early life ==
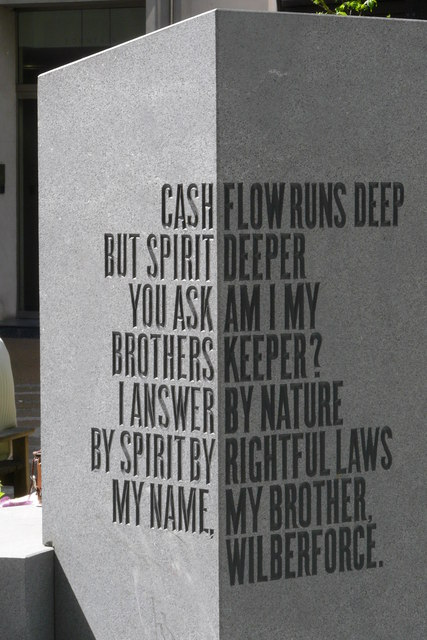
Extract from "The Gilt of Cain", a poem by Sissay, in Fen Court, London

Sissay's mother, Yemarshet Sissay, arrived in Britain from Ethiopia in 1966. Pregnant at the time, she was sent from Bracknell in Berkshire to a home for unmarried mothers in Lancashire to give birth. His birth father, Giddey Estifanos, who was a pilot for Ethiopian Airlines, died in a plane crash in 1972. Sissay was born in Billinge Hospital, Wigan, Lancashire, in 1967. Norman Goldthorpe, a social worker assigned to his mother by Wigan Social Services, found foster parents for Sissay while his mother returned to Bracknell to finish her studies.

Goldthorpe named Sissay "Norman" and put him in the care of foster parents, telling them to treat the placement as an adoption. The events are depicted in the play Something Dark and in the BBC documentary Internal Flight. His strongly religious foster parents wanted to name him Mark after the Christian evangelist Mark and give him their surname, Greenwood.

When Sissay was 12 years old, his foster parents—who, by then, had three biological children of their own—placed him in a children's home and said that no one from their family would contact him again.

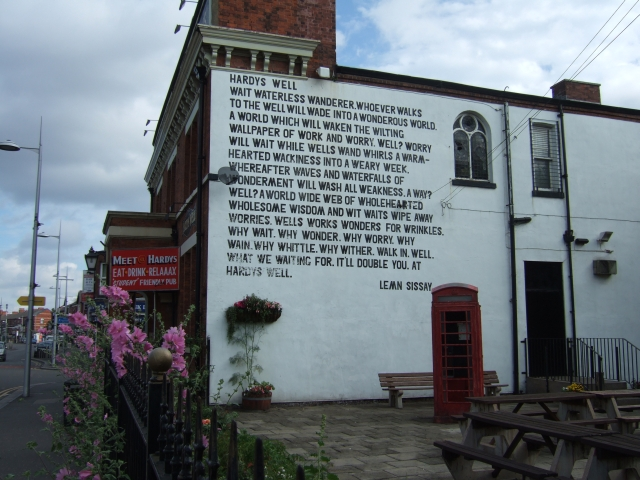
Poem by Sissay on Hardy's Well, Manchester

Between the ages of 12 and 17, Sissay was held in a total of four children's homes. With no surrogate or birth family to turn to when he aged out of the care system, he was finally given his birth certificate, which revealed the name of his mother, Yemarshet Sissay, and his own legal name, Lemn Sissay. He was also given a letter from his files, dated 1968, written by his mother to Norman Goldthorpe, pleading for her son's return. She wrote: "How can I get Lemn back? I want him to be with his own people, his own colour. I don't want him to face discrimination." From the point of leaving care, he began the search for his mother and took back his real name.

At the age of 17, Sissay used his unemployment benefit money to self-publish his first poetry pamphlet, Perceptions of the Pen, which he sold to striking miners in Lancashire. When he was 18 years old, he moved from Atherton to the city of Manchester. At 19, he was a literature development worker at Commonword, a community publishing cooperative in Manchester, where he set up their Cultureword strand for Black and Asian writers.

Sissay met his birth mother when he was 21, after a long search. She was working for the United Nations in the Gambia.

== Career ==
Before we get to know each other
And sing for tomorrow
And unearth yesterday
So that we can prepare our joint grave
You should know that I have no family,
Neither disowned nor distanced – none.

No birthdays nor Christmas,
No telephone calls. It's been that way
Since birth for what it's worth
No next of skin.

— From "Before we get into this" (2008)

Sissay released his first book of poetry in 1988 at the age of 21, and since the age of 24 he has been a full-time writer, performing internationally. In 1995, he made the BBC documentary Internal Flight about his life. His 2005 drama Something Dark deals with his search for his family, and was adapted for BBC Radio 3 in 2006, winning the UK Commission for Racial Equality's Race in the Media Award (RIMA).

In 2007, Sissay was appointed artist-in-residence at London's Southbank Centre. He was the official poet of the 2012 London Olympics, has worked with the British Council and is a patron of the Letterbox Club, supporting children in care. His work has featured at the Royal Academy and the British Film Institute. Sissay was made an Honorary Doctor of Letters by the University of Huddersfield in 2009 and was appointed Member of the Order of the British Empire (MBE) in the 2010 New Year Honours. In 2014 Sissay was appointed as a Fellow of the Foundling Museum.

Sissay's television appearances include The South Bank Show and the BBC's series Grumpy Old Men. As a radio broadcaster he makes documentaries for the BBC. He is a regular contributor on BBC Radio 4's programme Saturday Live, which in 2008 was nominated for two Sony Awards. He also contributes to the BBC's Book Panel.

In 2015, Sissay became the patron of ALL FM 96.9 Community Radio in Manchester, and he said: "I've always loved All Fm, partly because it's such diverse radio (with shows in Urdu, Polish, Somali, Persian, Cantonese and more), but also because it played 'Architecture' (Bertallot & Mo-Dus Remix), which I'd lost and the All Fm DJ sent me a copy." Sissay's poems are read frequently on All Fm and one of its older presenters, Li, aged 84, translated and read his poem "Invisible Kisses" in Mandarin and English. She said: "I love his poetry because it is so moving and not skin-deep."

In June 2015, Sissay was elected as chancellor of the University of Manchester for a seven-year term by university staff, registered alumni and members of the General Assembly. He took up his new role on 1 August, with an installation ceremony held on Foundation Day at the university on 14 October 2015, at which he said: "Reach for the top of the tree and you may get to the first branch but reach for the stars and you'll get to the top of the tree. My primary aim is to inspire and be inspired. I am proud to be Chancellor of this fantastic university and extremely grateful to everyone who voted for me." In the same month, Sissay was the castaway on BBC Radio 4's Desert Island Discs.

Open the dawn in the open sky
the laboratory - open the book, open the challenge, with open eyes. Open. Out. Look.
Open all minds, open all dreams, research, question Open all doors, open all senses
Open all defences, ask: What were these closed for? In the possibilities of light,
the nature of trust, the strength of unassailable us.

— From "Inspire and be Inspired" (2015)

In January 2016, Sissay wrote an article in The Guardian about the Foundling Museum's "Drawing on Childhood" exhibition in which he noted: "How a society treats those children who have no one to look after them is a measure of how civilised it is. It is scandalous that a prime minister should have to admit, as David Cameron did last autumn, that the care system 'shames our country' and that Ofsted should report that there are more councils judged as 'inadequate' than 'good' for their children's services." Later that year, Sissay became the patron of theatre company 20 Stories High, based in Toxteth, Liverpool, which creates diverse theatre including beatboxing, singing, puppetry and other media. In October of the same year, BBC Radio 4 broadcast the series Lemn Sissay's Origin Stories, in which he discussed his life; it was rebroadcast a year later.

In April 2017, Sissay joined the Foundling Museum's board of trustees. Later that year it was announced that he would appear in a revival of Jim Cartwright's 1986 play Road at the Royal Court Theatre. In September 2017, Sissay used his position as chancellor of the University of Manchester to launch a new bursary with the purpose of increasing the numbers of black men taking up careers in law and criminal justice. The initiative, part of the university's school of law's Black Lawyers Matter project, was created after it was found that "out of some 1,200 undergraduates, only 14 UK-based Black males of African and Caribbean heritage were registered on law and criminology courses, and of these none were from lower socio-economic backgrounds".

In the same year, he staged a one-off show, entitled The Report, based on a psychologist's report about Sissay's early life and how it affected him. The show details his experience with social services, foster homes, abuse and his psychiatric diagnoses: post-traumatic stress disorder, avoidant personality disorder and alcohol use disorder. He brought a case against Wigan Council that was settled in 2018 with a six-figure payout and a formal apology to Sissay for the treatment he suffered when in care.

In June 2019 it was announced that Sissay had won the 2019 PEN Pinter Prize, awarded to writers who take an "unflinching, unswerving" view of the world, with one of the judging panel, Maureen Freely, saying: "In his every work, Lemn Sissay returns to the underworld he inhabited as an unclaimed child. From his sorrows, he forges beautiful words and a thousand reasons to live and love."

In January 2020, Sissay joined the Booker Prize judging panel, alongside Margaret Busby (chair), Lee Child, Sameer Rahim and Emily Wilson.

Sissay was featured walking in Dentdale towards England's highest railway station, in the Winter Walks television series broadcast in December 2020 on BBC Four.

In May 2021, Sissay appeared on BBC One's Have I Got News for You, hosted by Romesh Ranganathan, alongside fellow panellists Ian Hislop, Paul Merton and Jo Brand.

Sissay was appointed Officer of the Order of the British Empire (OBE) in the 2021 Birthday Honours for services to literature and charity. He was quoted in the Hackney Gazette as saying: "I'm honoured.... If you had gone to my 17-year-old self and said: 'In 2021 the Queen's going to give you [an honour], I would have said: 'No way.' So it's worth believing." He was elected a Fellow of the Royal Society of Literature in 2022.

In October 2023, Sissay participated in Series 7, Week 5 of Richard Osman's House of Games.

=== Books ===
- Tender Fingers in a Clenched Fist. Bogle-L'Ouverture, 1988. ISBN 978-0-90452-144-3.
- Rebel Without Applause. Bloodaxe Books, 1992 (Canongate Books, 2000). ISBN 978-1-84195-001-3.
- Morning Breaks in the Elevator. Canongate Books, 1999. ISBN 978-1-84767-743-3.
- The Fire People (editor). Payback Press, 1998. ISBN 9780862417390.
- The Emperor's Watchmaker. Bloomsbury Children's Books, 2001. ISBN 978-0-74754-755-6.
- Listener, Canongate Books, 2008. ISBN 978-1-84195-895-8.
- Hidden Gems (ed. Deirdre Osborne; Sissay contributed "Something Dark"), Oberon Books, 2008. ISBN 978-1-84002-843-0.
- Refugee Boy, Bloomsbury stage adaptation of Benjamin Zephaniah's novel Refugee Boy, 2013. ISBN 978-1-47250-645-0
- My Name Is Why, autobiography of his early life, with observations on the British care system. Canongate Books, 2019. ISBN 978-1-78689-234-8
- Let the Light Pour In. Canongate Books, 2023. ISBN 978-1805301134

=== Plays ===
- Skeletons in the Cupboard (1993), Bury Metro Arts
- Don't Look Down (1993)
- Chaos by Design (1994), Community Arts Workshop
- Storm (2002), Contact Theatre
- Something Dark (2006), Battersea Arts Centre/Contact Theatre/Apples and Snakes
- Why I Don't Hate White People (2011), Hammersmith Lyric Theatre
- Refugee Boy (2013), West Yorkshire Playhouse
- Metamorphosis (2023), Frantic Assembly

=== BBC radio plays ===
- Chaos by Design (BBC Radio 1994)
- Something Dark (BBC Radio 2006)
- Something Dark – Live (ABC 2012)
- Why I Don't Hate White People (BBC Radio 3, 2010)
