= The Curry Mile =

2006 novel by Zahid Hussain

- First edition
- Author: Zahid Hussain
- Cover artist: Ian Bobb
- Language: English
- Publisher: Suitcase Press
- Publication date: 2006
- Publication place: UK
- Media type: Print (UK trade paperback)
- Pages: 284 (UK trade)
- ISBN: 1-905778-00-7

The Curry Mile is a 2006 novel written by Manchester-based British Pakistani novelist, Zahid Hussain. The debut novel was also the first book published by Suitcase Press. The book is set on Wilmslow Road, also known as the Curry Mile, in the Rusholme area of Manchester. The novel is a piece of urban realism written in dual narrative. It charts the life of a Pakistani family in the restaurant trade.

== Reception ==
Rachel Hore from The Guardian newspaper wrote, "Sparky characters, exuberant idiom and rich detail combine to make this an enjoyable slice of Desi life, Manchester style".

Ziauddin Sardar named The Curry Mile one of the books of the year in New Statesman Magazine and wrote, "The Curry Mile by Zahid Hussain tells the story of a young, rebellious Muslim woman who is forced to rescue her father's restaurant business in Manchester's Asian area. Squabbling families with overbearing fathers, neighbourhood business feuds, charlatan mystics, music and mayhem - all human life is there".
