= John Siddique =

English spiritual teacher (born 1964)

- Born: July 1964 (age 61–62); UK
- Education: Manchester University
- Occupations: Author and Spiritual teacher
- Years active: 1991 - Present
- Website: www.johnsiddique.com www.authenticliving.life

John Siddique (born July 1964) is an author and spiritual teacher.

Siddique has published nine books and his writings and teachings have featured in Time Magazine, The Guardian, Granta, on CNN and the BBC. The Times of India called him "Rebellious by nature, pure at heart." The Spectator magazine described him as "A stellar British poet." New York Times correspondent Bina Shah says Siddique is "One of the best poets of our generation." Former Scottish Poet Laureate Jackie Kay speaks of Siddique's writing as being "A brilliant balancing act."

Siddique is the Honorary Fellow in Creative Writing at Leicester University. He is the former Laureate of the British city of Canterbury, and British Council Poet in Residence at California State University, Los Angeles. From 2013 to 2015 he was the Royal Literary Fund (RLF) Fellow at York St. John University and is a founding editor for the RLF's WritersMosaic initiative. He is the Project Co-ordinator for the Royal Literary Fund and WritersMosaic in The North of England

== Personal life ==
Siddique was born in Rochdale, Lancashire, England. The young Siddique immersed himself in the world of books through his local library. Before becoming a writer, he drifted through various jobs such as being a roadie, a pipe-welder, and landscape gardener. He first began writing in 1991 after reading James Joyce's Ulysses and discovering the poetry of e.e. cummings, Walt Whitman, and D. H. Lawrence. Siddique has stated in interviews that he regards his true countries of birth to be "literature and language".

== Published works ==
Non-Fiction

- Signposts of The Spiritual Journey (Watkins Publishing, 2021) ISBN 978-1786785176

Poetry

- So – Selected New Poems 2011–21 (Crocus, 2022) ISBN 978-0946745395
- Full Blood (Salt Publishing, 2011) ISBN 978-1844718245
- Recital – An Almanac (Salt, 2009) ISBN 978-1844715145
- Blackpool – A Poet’s View (Blackpool Council, 2009)
- Poems from a Northern Soul (Crocus, 2007) ISBN 978-0946745876
- Transparency (editor) (Crocus, 2006) ISBN 978-0946745722
- The Prize (Rialto, 2005) ISBN 978-0952744481
- The Devil's Lunchbox (Crocus, 1996) ISBN 978-0952898801

Short stories

- Four Fathers (co-author) (Route, 2007) ISBN 978-1901927276

For children

- Don’t Wear It On Your Head (Salt, 2010) ISBN 978-1844717637

Selected anthologies

- New Writing 15 (Granta)
- The Fire People (Payback/Canongate Books)
- The HarperCollins Book of English Poetry (HarperCollins)
- Masala (MacMillan)
- Out of Bounds (Bloodaxe Books)
- RED (Peepal Tree Press)
- Life Lines – Poets for Oxfam CD
- I Am The Seed That Grew The Tree (Nosy Crow/National Trust)
- Contraflow - Lines of Englishness (Renard Press)

Prizes, awards and honours

- Hawthornden Fellowship
- Royal Literary Fund Fellow – York St. John University, 2013–15
- Honorary Creative Writing Fellow at Leicester University
- Arts Council of England Writer's Awards, 2005, 2006, 2007, 2011
- Shortlisted for CPLE Poetry Award, 2007
- Nomination for Best First Collection – Forward Prize, 2005
- Nomination for Best Poem – Forward Prize, 2004

Residencies

- Canterbury Poet Laureate 2016
- Royal Literary Fund Fellow – York St. John 2013/15 & 2014/15
- Manchester Literature Festival, 2010
- Los Angeles for The British Council, 2009
- Blackpool – Poet in Residence, 2008
- Manchester Art Gallery, 2008
- Fundacion Valparaiso, 2006
- The Rainer Charity, Wigan, 2005
- Commonword/BBC Manchester – Poet in Residence, 2005
- Ilkley Literature Festival - Poet in Residence, 2004
- HMYOI Wetherby – Writer in Residence, 2000–03
- Ledbury Poetry Festival – Writer in Residence for Young People, 2000–03
- The LOWRY – Poet in residence, 2000–01
- Prestwich NHS Trust – Poet in Residence, 2000
