= Dean Atta =

British poet

Dean Atta is a British poet of Greek Cypriot and Caribbean descent. He has been listed by The Independent newspaper as one of the 100 most influential LGBT people in the United Kingdom. In 2012, his poem "I Am Nobody's Nigger", written in response to the use of the racial slur by the murderers of Stephen Lawrence, achieved much social media coverage, and he was profiled in The Guardian.

Born to a Greek Cypriot mother and Jamaican father, he earned a BA degree (2006) in Philosophy and English from the University of Sussex, where he was president of the African Caribbean Society. His poetry, which often deals with questions of identity and social justice, has been featured on BBC Radio 4, and he has been commissioned to write for museums and galleries including the Keats House Museum, the National Portrait Gallery, London, Tate Britain and Tate Modern. In 2018, Atta served as a judge for the BBC Young Writers Award.

In 2019 Atta's verse novel, The Black Flamingo, was published by Hachette UK. For The Black Flamingo, Atta was one of two winners of the Stonewall Book Award 2020 in the Children's and Young Adults category. The book was praised by the author Malorie Blackman. His poem "I Come From" was adapted into a film by afshan d'souza-lodhi.

In 2024, Atta was the runner up in the Caterpillar Poetry Prize.

In 2025, Atta's short film 'Two Black Boys in Paradise' was nominated for several major awards.

== Books ==
- I Am Nobody's Nigger, Westborne Press, 2013 (shortlisted for the Polari First Book Prize)
- The Black Flamingo, Hachette UK, 2019
- Only On The Weekends, Hachette UK, 2022
- There is (still) love here, Nine Arches Press, 2022
- Person Unlimited: An Ode to My Black Queer Body, Canongate Books, 2024
- Confetti, Orchard Books, 2024 (illustrated by Alea Marley)
- I Can't Even Think Straight, Quill Tree Books, 2025
