= Liyou Libsekal =

Ethiopian poet and writer (born 1990)

- Born: Liyou Mesfin Libsekal; 1990 (age 35–36); Addis Ababa, Ethiopia
- Education: George Washington University
- Occupations: Poet, writer and essayist
- Writing career
- Notable work: Bearing Heavy Things
- Notable awards: 2014 Brunel University African Poetry Prize

Liyou Mesfin Libsekal (born 1990) is an Ethiopian poet, writer, and essayist based in Addis Ababa, Ethiopia. Poems authored by Libsekal were featured in the African Poetry Book Fund's 'New Generation Chapbook Box Sets' series in 2015. She won the Brunel University African Poetry Prize in the year 2014 and she is the author of a chapbook titled Bearing Heavy Things.

Liyou Mesfin Libsekal currently lives in the city of Addis Ababa in her mother country of Ethiopia. She began writing about Ethiopian culture and the environment there for Ethiopian Business Review(EBR), a media company based in Addis Ababa, in 2013 and does to this day.

== Early life ==
Liyou Mesfin Libsekal was born in Ethiopia and is ethnically Ethiopian but spent her childhood traveling and living in various areas in East Africa with her family before returning to her birth country of Ethiopia in 2005. She later moved to the United States of America to attend George Washington University in Washington, District of Columbia where she obtained a Bachelor of Arts in Anthropology in 2012. She graduated with a minor in international affairs and a concentration in international development. She returned to Africa once again, after living a short time in Vietnam.

== Literary career ==
Liyou Libsekal's poetry explores themes of identity, origins, home and the emotional displacement that can be caused by growing up away from home. She also writes about the effects of modernization and globalization as pertaining to Ethiopia's economy and culture. Libsekal began writing poetry as a way to "gain some sort of personal understanding" and draws inspiration from herself and her environment. Her work has been included in the following: Badilisha Poetry, Expound Magazine's The Woman Issue, Elsewhere Lit's African Poetry anthology and other publications. She writes her poems mostly in English, the rest being written in Amharic, one of the official languages of Ethiopia. Her genre of writing is non-fiction.

== Works ==
=== Chapbooks ===
==== 2015–2016 ====
- Bearing Heavy Things (Akashic Books, 2015)

==== Poetry curations ====
- Things We Inherited: Voices From Africa (Cordite Poetry Review, 2016)

=== Poems ===
==== 2014–2020 ====
- Vanquishing Visions (Liyou Libsekal, 2014)
- Riding Chinese Machines (Liyou Libsekal, 2014)
- In the Voice of our Rain (Liyou Libsekal, 2014)
- Composer (Cordite Poetry Review, 2016)
- "Revival" (Cordite poetry Review, 2016)
- Into the earth (Expound Magazine, 2017)
- Gospels (Liyou Libsekal, 2020)
- Hair (Liyou Libsekal, 2020)
- Bearing heavy things (Songs We Learn from Trees: An Anthology of Ethiopian Amharic Poetry, 2020)
- Federal (Liyou Libsekal, release year unknown)

=== Essays ===
- Sistine Chapels (A Long House, 2020)
- Freezer Peanuts (Marginalia Publishing, 2011-2025)

Libsekal's poetry chapbook titled "Bearing Heavy Things" is included in the African Poetry Book Fund's 'New Generation Chapbook Box Sets' series, along with the works of Peter Akinlabi, Inua Ellams, Janet Kofi-Tsekpo, Amy M. Lukau, Vuyelwa Maluleke, Blessing Musariri, and Viola Alto. The collection was edited by Kwame Dawes & Chris Abani. The book was published by Akashic Books with a cover created by artist Imo Nse Imeh. Bearing Heavy Things is also the title of a single poem of Libsekal's, included in Songs We Learn from Trees: An Anthology of Ethiopian Amharic Poetry by Chris Beckett(released in 2020), along with another poem, Gospels.

In a transcribed interview titled The Poetry of the Observable World: A Dialogue With Liyou Libsekal, she speaks about the origins of the title for her book, "Bearing Heavy Things", "I think it suited the whole poetry collection because it really was sort of coming back and realizing all the things I never realized about my country before because I was too young to notice.-I think that title suited that because there are a lot of things that are messed up in this place and it was sort of like me dealing with that for the first time as an adult." The interview took place in 2017 over the phone, and was conducted by fellow creative and poet, Gaamangwe Mogami. In 2016, she curated an African poetry e-chapbook for Cordite Poetry Review titled "Things We Inherited: Voices From Africa". The book features two of Libsekal's own pieces: "("Revival")" and "Composer", both also released in 2016 .In 2020, she wrote a memoir-style essay titled "Sistine Chapels", which can be read on the website of A Long House.

== Awards ==
Libsekal is winner of the 2014 Brunel University African Poetry Prize, which was retired in 2022 and the name of which has been changed to the Evaristo Prize for African Poetry. Her winning poem was titled "Riding Chinese Machines", also published by The Missing Slate magazine, and for this she drew inspiration from the city she lives in today, Addis Ababa in Ethiopia. This win came before Libsekal had released a full poetry collection and she submitted 10 poems. The prize was money in the amount of £3000. During her participation in the competition, Liyou Libsekal had an interview conducted by The African Book Review, during which she named Kwesi Brew as one of her favorite poets. She appeared with the founder of the prize, Bernardine Evaristo, at the Times Cheltenham Literature Festival on October 10th, 2014.
