= Seamus Heaney Centre =

Queen's University Belfast creative writing school

Seamus Heaney Centre at Queen's
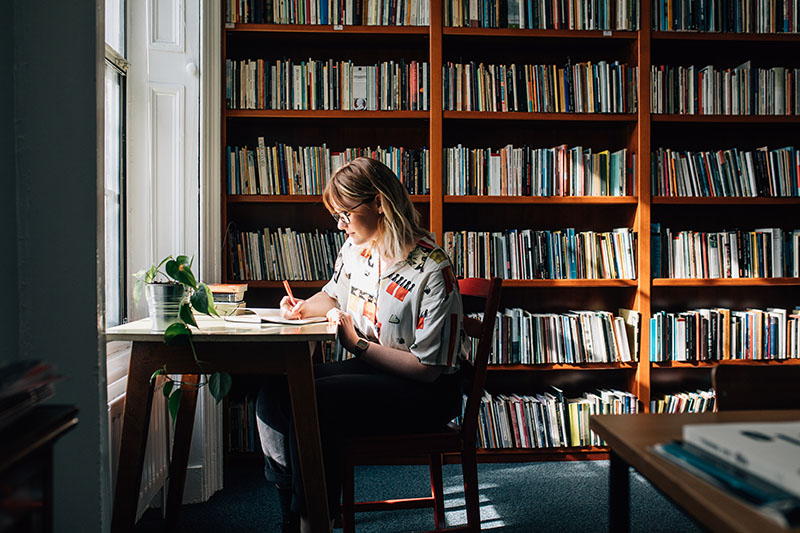
- The library in the Seamus Heaney Centre at Queen's
- Formation: 2004; 22 years ago
- Type: Research Centre
- Location: 46-48 University Road, Belfast BT7 1NJ
- Director: Glenn Patterson
- Website: www.qub.ac.uk/schools/seamus-heaney-centre/

The Seamus Heaney Centre at Queens is located at Queen's University Belfast, and named after the late Seamus Heaney, recipient of the 1995 Nobel Prize in Literature. Heaney graduated from Queens in 1961 with a First Class Honours in English language and literature.

It was officially opened in February 2004 and its founding director was the poet and Queen's graduate Ciaran Carson. Carson retired as director in 2014. He was replaced by Prof. Fran Brearton from 2014-17, with assistant director Prof. Sinead Morrissey 2015-16. Fran Brearton and Sinead Morrissey brought in the funding for the Centre's Children's Writing Fellow and International Visiting fellows and support for the SHC First Collection Poetry Prize. She was succeeded by Glenn Patterson 2018-present.

On 30 April 2009, it gave Heaney a 70th birthday party involving a literary evening.

In 2023 Queen's University renamed the centre as The Seamus Heaney Centre at Queens and it was relocated to 38-40 University Road, Belfast, in a building that had received a £4.9 million renovation. The new centre displays archived material in an exhibition area, has an expanded poetry library, a large venue area, teaching rooms, academic offices, and scriptorium. It is now open to the public.

== First Collection Poetry Prize ==
The prize is awarded to a poet whose first collection of poetry has been published in the previous year by a UK- or Ireland-based publisher. It is part of the Seamus Heaney Legacy Project funded by Atlantic Philanthropies. The winner receives £5,000 and is invited to give the Tom Quinlan Lecture in Poetry at New York University with travel accommodation and a $1,000 honorarium included.

Previous recipients of the prize are:

- 2013 – Sarah Jackson for Pelt (Bloodaxe Books)
- 2014 – Tara Bergin for This is Yarrow (Carcanet)
- 2015 – Fiona Benson for Bright Travellers (Cape Poetry)
- 2016 – Kate Miller for The Observances (Carcanet)
- 2017 – Adam Crothers for Several Deer (Carcanet)
- 2018 – Richard Osmond for Useful Verses (Picador Poetry)
- 2019 – Ned Denny for Unearthly Toys (Carcanet)
- 2020 – Laura Scott for So Many Rooms (Carcanet, 2019)
- 2021 – Sumita Chakraborty for Arrow (Carcanet, 2020)
- 2022 – Victoria Kennefick for Eat or We Both Starve (Carcanet 2021)
- 2023 – Mark Pajak for Slide (Cape Poetry)
