= Yvonne Reddick =

Manchester-based British poet and academic

- Born: 1986 (age 39–40); Glasgow, Scotland
- Education: PhD, MA, BA
- Alma mater: University of Warwick; University of York; University of Cambridge
- Occupations: Poet; Academic
- Writing career
- Language: English
- Genre: Poetry
- Notable works: Burning Season; Spikenard; Translating Mountains
- Notable awards: The Laurel Prize for Best UK First Collection, 2023; Mslexia Magazine Pamphlet Competition, 2017
- Website: yvonnereddick.org

Yvonne Reddick is a Glasgow-born writer, editor, ecopoetry scholar, filmmaker and climber based in Manchester. She is the author of four poetry pamphlets, including the Mslexia Women's Pamphlet Competition-winning Translating Mountains, published by Seren in 2017, and a 2019 Laureate's Choice Spikenard, published by The Poetry Business, and has published Burning Season, the Laurel Prize 2023 Best UK First Collection, with Bloodaxe Books.

== Early life ==
Reddick, who was born in Glasgow to a petroleum engineer father and a mother who worked in seismology in 1986, grew up in Aberdeen, Kuwait City and South East England. She went on to study English at the University of Cambridge, where she worked with Dr. Robert Macfarlane. She then got an MA at the University of York, and PhD at the University of Warwick under the supervision of Prof. Jonathan Bate. Moving forward, an Early Career Fellowship helped begin her career at Warwick, where, collaborating with colleagues from chemistry and law, she then founded the Environmental Studies Research Network, funded by the Institute of Advanced Study (IAS) and EPSRC. Reddick was later appointed Visiting Fellow at the University of Liverpool's Centre for the Study of International Slavery.

Reddick's father died in 2015 following an accident while hiking in the Scottish Highlands in 2015. This event pushed her to explore mountaineers' fascination of heights through poetry, and a resulting set of poems was a winning entry in the Northern Writers' Awards 2016, selected by Patience Agbabi. It also paved the way for her winning a Hawthornden Fellowship for 2017. Similar poems also make up for a chunk of poems in her debut poetry collection, Burning Season.

== Work ==
Much like Bate's work in the field of British environmental literary criticism, Reddick focusses on British environmental poetry, especially the work of Ted Hughes. This has led to the publication of Ted Hughes: Environmentalist and Ecopoet with Palgrave Macmillan in 2017, called "the first book devoted entirely to Hughes as an environmental activist and writer." She was later commended in the 2017 National Poetry Competition, organised by the Poetry Society, for her poem 'Muirburn'. She also won that year's Peggy Poole Award and, as part of it, was mentored by Deryn Rees-Jones.

Reddick has published work in such journals as Ambit, The Guardian, PN Review, The Clearing, Agenda, The North, The Poetry Review, and And Other Poems. Through her ecopoetry publications, she has been noted as "an academic expert on poetry, landscape and the environment", and won several awards, including a Northern Writers' Award for memoir and poetry, and a place on the 2017–18 Jerwood/Arvon mentoring scheme. Apart from Ted Hughes's work, she has also published commentary on the works of Fiona Benson, David Harsent, Paul Lomami Tchibamba, Keith Sagar, Alice Oswald, John Kinsella, Nancy Campbell, and more.

In 2019, Reddick was awarded the first prize of £500 in the Ambit Poetry Competition for her poem 'In the Burning Season', a "wild fiery folkloric poem", selected by the poet Liz Berry. In 2020, she published Poetry, Grief and Healing, "a collection of moving and uplifting poems by leading poets", with Dog Horn Publishing; and following her book about Hughes as an ecopoet, she published another, Anthropocene Poetry: Place, Environment, and Planet, with Palgrave Macmillan in 2023. The same year, Reddick also published her debut collection, Burning Season, with Bloodaxe Books, which won the 2023 Best UK First Collection for Ecopoetry at the Laurel Prize ceremony and was shortlisted for the Scottish Poetry Book of the Year 2023. Writing for Harriet Books, Rebecca Morgan Frank noted that "[d]estruction and care coexist throughout" the collection, calling it a reflection of "our human contradictions." The collection was later shortlisted for the 2025 ASLE-UKI Book Prize. The collection's title poem 'Burning Season' was awarded the third prize in the Ginkgo Prize for Ecopoetry 2022.

A documentary film titled Searching for Snow Hares and written, presented and narrated by Reddick was produced in 2023-2024. She worked on this six year long project with the Bristol-based filmmaker, photographer and biologist Aleksander Domanski, who directed and produced the film. It was shortlisted for the British Mountaineering Council's Women in Adventure Film Competition 2023. A recent report says the duo are "filming unique wildlife in California" as part of a new project, titled Forest Fires and Snowshoe Hares, to study animals "coping with climate change."

In 2024, Reddick was among a number of writers to urge the government to set up a dedicated writing centre for the North at Newcastle's Bolbec Hall. In 2026, she was on the shortlist for Dialect Press's inaugural DIRT Plantable Poetry Competition.

Previously, she has also edited two autumn issues of Magma: with Adam Lowe, Magma 75 – "Loss"; and with Maya Chowdhry and Cheryl Moskowitz, Magma 81 – "Anthropocene".

== Books ==
Reddick has published a total of four pamphlets and a full-length poetry collection.

=== Full-length collections ===
- Burning Season (Bloodaxe, 2023) ISBN 9781780376455

=== Pamphlets ===
- Spikenard (Smith/Doorstop, 2019) ISBN 9781912196210
- Translating Mountains (Seren, 2017) ISBN 9781781724200
- Deerhart (Knives Forks and Spoons Press, 2016)
- LandForms (Orkney: Seapressed, 2012)

=== Critical works ===
- Anthropocene Poetry: Place, Environment, and Planet (Palgrave Macmillan, 2023) ISBN 9783031393884
- Ted Hughes: Environmentalist and Ecopoet (Palgrave Macmillan, 2017) ISBN 9783319591766

=== As editor ===
- Magma 81 – "Anthropocene", with Maya Chowdhry and Cheryl Moskowitz (2021)
- Poetry, Grief and Healing (Dog Horn Publishing, 2020) ISBN 9781907133329
- Magma 75 – "Loss", with Adam Lowe (2019)
- The Apple Anthology, with George Ttoouli (Nine Arches Press, 2013) ISBN 9780957384798

== Awards ==
- 2016: Northern Writers' Awards
- 2016: Hawthornden Fellowship for 2017.
- 2017: Mslexia Women's Pamphlet Competition, for Translating Mountains
- 2018: Commended, National Poetry Competition 2017
- 2018: Peggy Poole Award 2017
- 2019: First Prize, Ambit Poetry Competition 2019, for 'In the Burning Season'
- 2023: Third Prize, Ginkgo Prize for Ecopoetry 2022, for 'Burning Season' (poem)
- 2023: Best UK First Collection for Ecopoetry, The Laurel Prize
