= Victoria Kennefick =

Irish poet

Victoria Kennefick is an Irish poet. She has been an artist/poet/writer in residence for Cork County Council, University College Dublin and the Yeats Society. She has been a recipient of bursaries from the Arts Council of Ireland and Kerry County Council. Her collection Eat or We Both Starve won the Seamus Heaney Centre First Collection Poetry Prize, and was shortlisted for the T. S. Eliot Prize and Costa Book Award for Poetry.

== Background ==
Kennefick comes from Shanagarry, County Cork. She studied in University College Cork (UCC) and obtained a Fulbright scholarship, with terms attended in Emory University and Georgia College & State University. She holds a doctorate in American literature from UCC.

She was named Cork County Council writer-in-residence in December 2023.

== Personal life ==
Kennefick's father died while she was undertaking her doctoral work. Kennefick lives in Tralee, County Kerry, She has one child.

== Recognition and awards ==
Eat or We Both Starve won the Seamus Heaney Centre First Collection Poetry Prize, and was shortlisted for the T. S. Eliot Prize in 2021.

Her work was quoted on a Leaving Certificate exam paper in 2023.

== Works ==
- Kennefick, Victoria (2015). White Whale. Southward Editions. ISBN 9781905002405. OCLC 908450834.
- Kennefick, Victoria (2021). Eat or We Both Starve. Carcanet Press. ISBN 9781800170711. OCLC 1226763665.
- Kennefick, Victoria (2024). Egg/Shell. Carcanet Press. ISBN 9781800173842. OCLC 1410592356.
