= Curry Mile =

Street in Manchester, United Kingdom

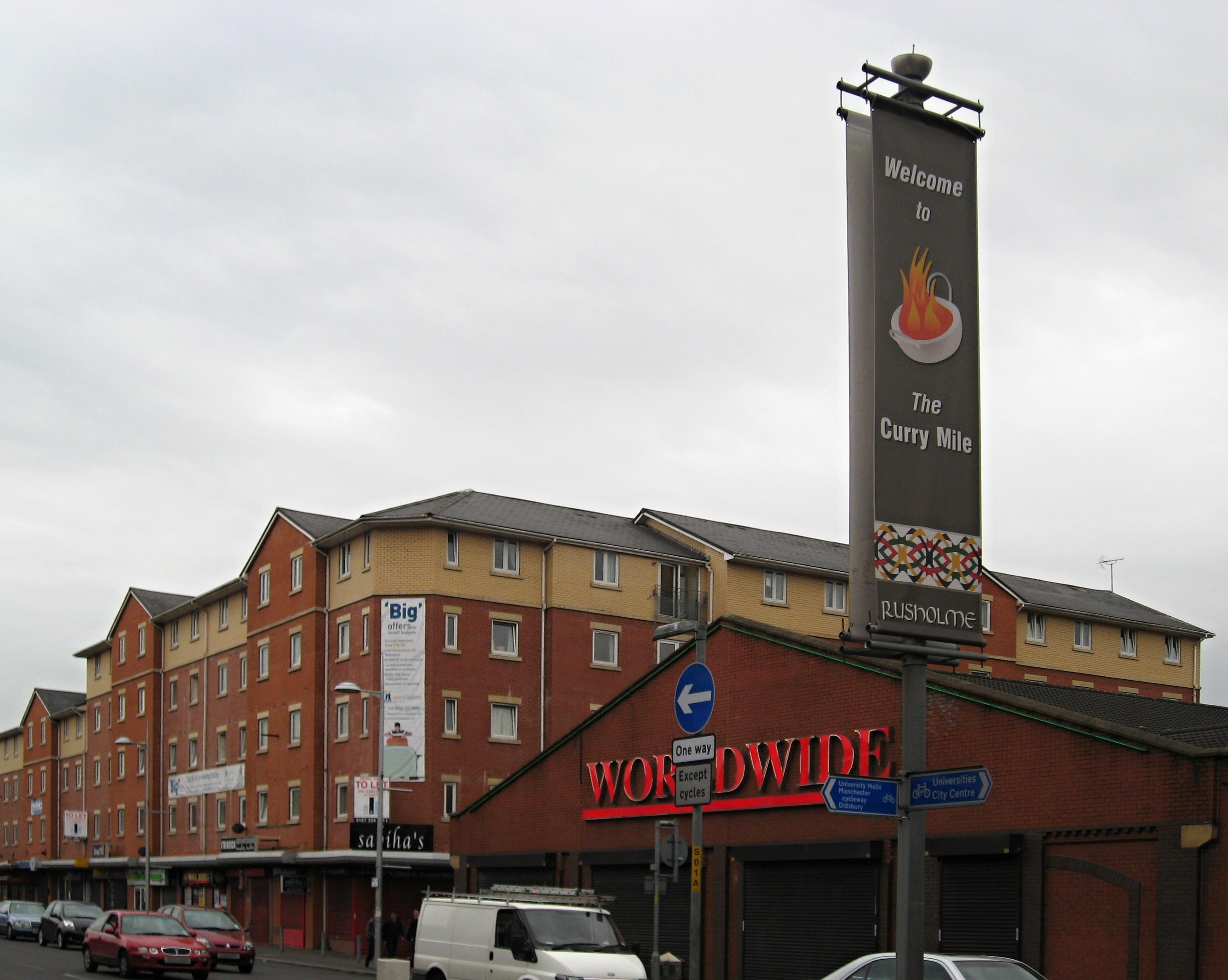
Welcome to the Curry Mile

The Curry Mile is a nickname for the part of Wilmslow Road running through the centre of Rusholme in south Manchester, England.

== Street ==
The name is earned from the large number of restaurants, takeaways, and kebab houses specialising in the cuisines of South Asia and the Middle East, thought to be the largest concentration of South Asian restaurants in the United Kingdom. The Curry Mile is notably busy into the early hours of the morning. The area is frequently visited by students, because of its proximity to the Oxford Road and Fallowfield campuses of the University of Manchester, Xaverian College, and the Oxford Road/All Saints campus of the Manchester Metropolitan University.

In the 21st century, several shisha bars have opened along the street, with some occupying the premises of former pubs.

Views of the Curry Mile

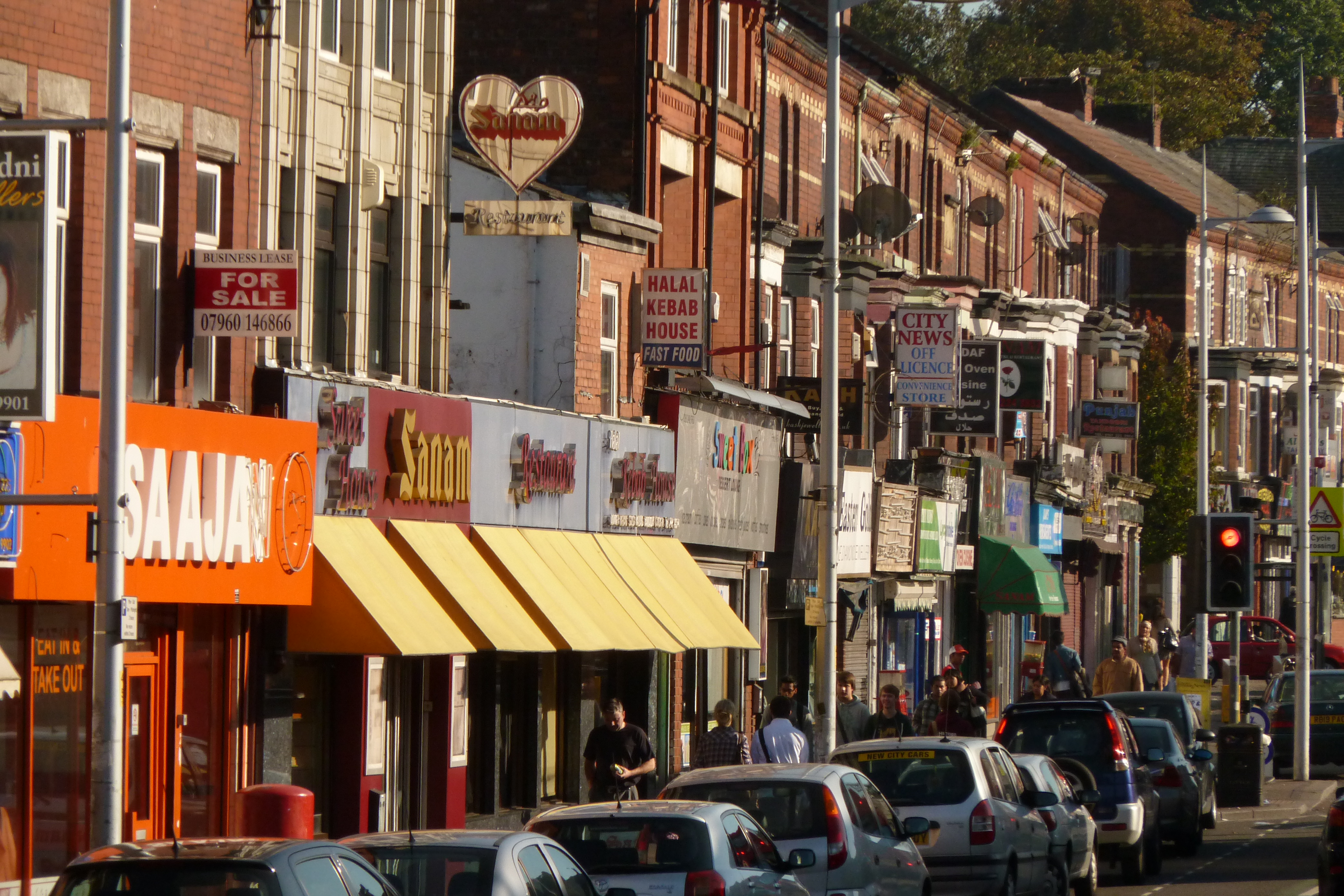
Restaurants

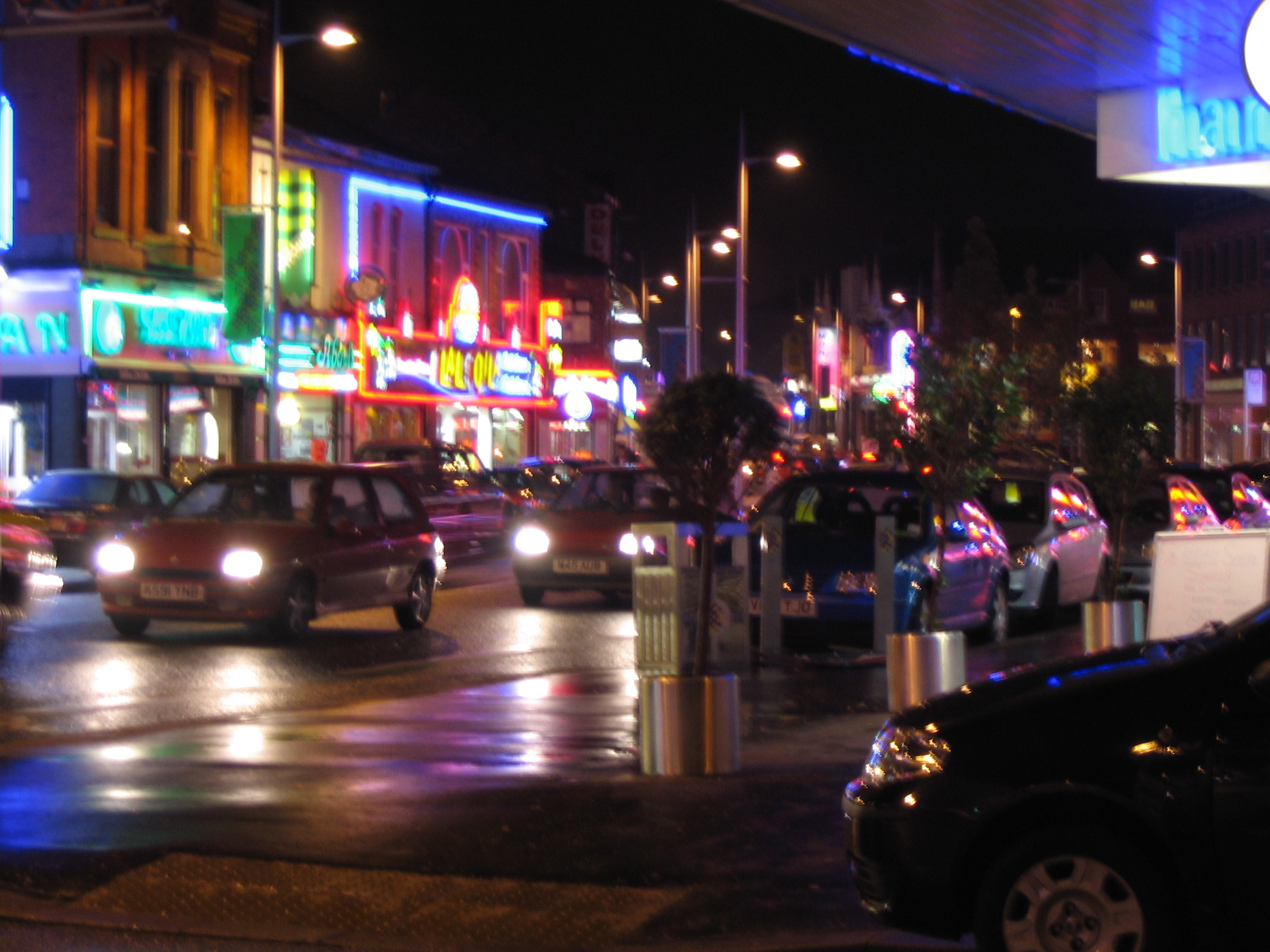
At nighttime

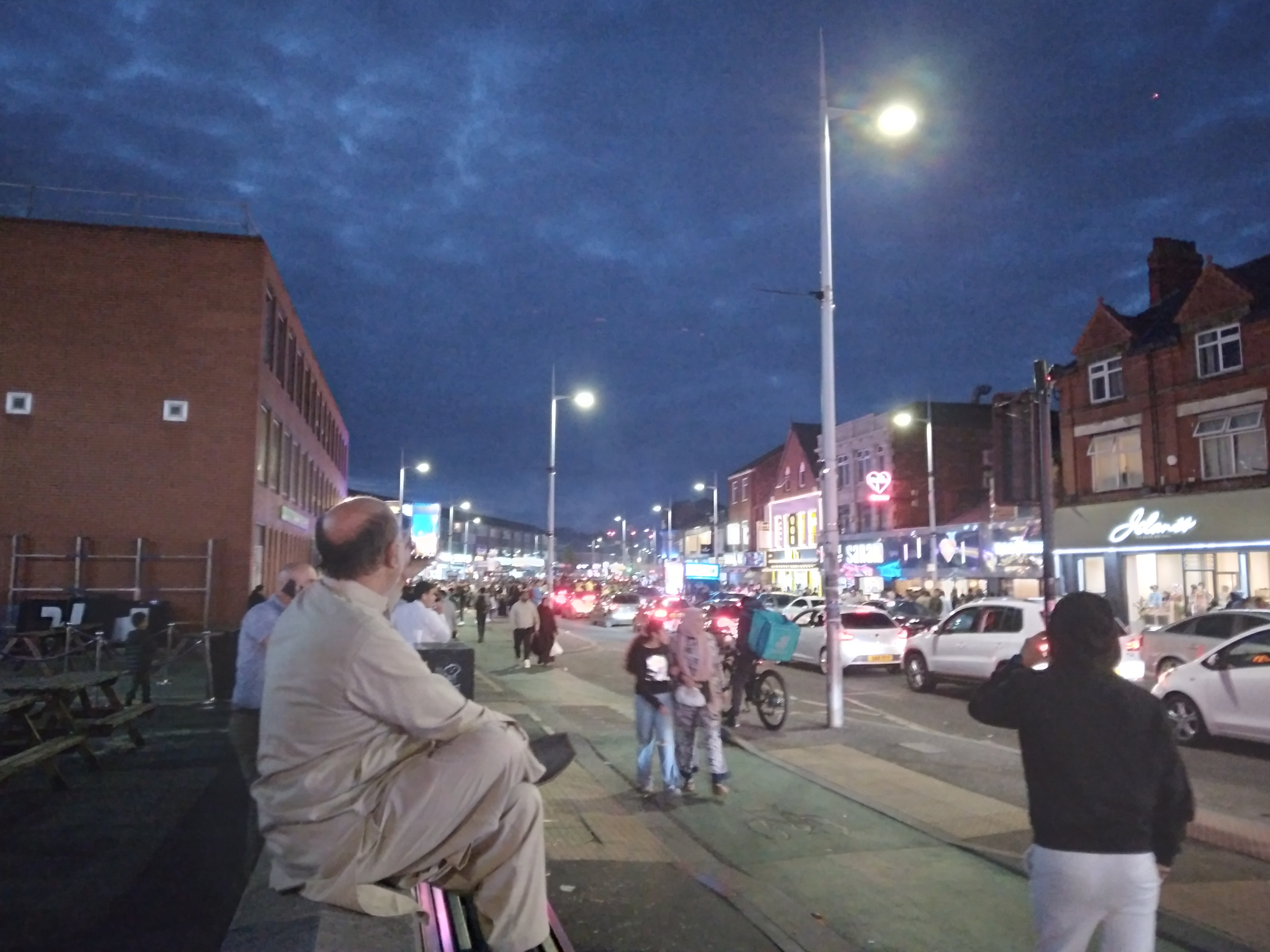
Traffic jam during Eid al-Adha, June 2023

== In film ==
In May 1995, Aneel Ahmed and Faisal A. Qureshi wrote Movin As A Massive, a Channel 4 documentary written for the Lloyds Bank Film Challenge, of which it was the winning entry. It also won the 1996 "Race in the Media Award" for Best Youth Programme, and was nominated by the Royal Television Society in 1996 for "Most Innovative Film/Video". It was directed by Ninder Billing, and produced by Andy Porter and Madeline French for Compulsive Viewing. A semi sequel, Wimmy Road, was later written for BBC Radio Drama by Qureshi and directed by Nadia Molinari. It was nominated for a "Race in the Media Award" for Best Radio Drama. The Curry Mile was the main filming location for the episode Serving the Community (1997) from the television series Hetty Wainthropp Investigates.

== In books ==
The Curry Mile, a novel written by Zahid Hussain, is set in the contemporary Curry Mile, and features characters involved in the restaurant trade. Blackburn-born filmmaker and writer Sufiyaan Salam won the 2024 Merky Books New Writers' Prize for his novel Wimmy Road Boyz, set across one night on the Curry Mile.

== See also ==
- Curry Row, Lower Manhattan, New York City
- The Golden Mile, Leicester, England
- List of restaurant districts and streets
