= Zoë Brigley =

Welsh poet (born 1981)

- Born: 1981 (age 44–45)
- Education: University of Warwick
- Occupation: Writer
- Writing career
- Period: 2007-
- Genres: Poetry, Non-Fiction
- Notable awards: Eric Gregory Award, 2003
- Website: www.zoebrigley.com

Zoë Brigley or Zoë Brigley Thompson (born 1981) is a Welsh poet, editor of Poetry Wales, and assistant professor in the Department of English of Ohio State University.

== Biography ==
Brigley was born in 1981 and grew up in Caerphilly in the Rhymney Valley. She has a BA (2002), MA (2004) and PhD (2007) from the University of Warwick. Her doctoral thesis was titled: Exile and ecology : the poetic practice of Gwyneth Lewis, Pascale Petit and Deryn Rees-Jones. She won a 2003 Eric Gregory Award, an award given by the Society of Authors for a collection by a poet aged under 30.

She has had three volumes of poetry published by Bloodaxe Books: The Secret (2007), Conquest (2012), and Hand & Skull (2019). All three were Poetry Book Society recommendations. In 2019 she published Notes from a Swing State: Writings from Wales and America and co-edited Feminism, Literature and Rape Narratives: Violence and Violation.

In 2021, Brigley edited a special issue of the magazine Magma Poetry with Rob A. Mackenzie and Kristian Evans. In 2021 Brigley and Marvin Thompson were appointed as the first joint editors of the magazine Poetry Wales. However, Thompson stepped down from the role three weeks later. Since then, Brigley has introduced a scheme where a series of contributing editors join the magazine for a couple of issues. She edited with Kristian Evans the anthology 100 Poems to Save the Earth for Seren Books, and in 2022 became a poetry editor for the press along with the Welsh poet Rhian Edwards.

Brigley was married to mathematics professor Dan Thompson, but they have divorced.

== Selected publications ==
- The Secret (2007), Bloodaxe Books: ISBN 9781852247874)
- Conquest (2012, Bloodaxe Books: ISBN 9781852249304)
- Hand & Skull (2019, Bloodaxe Books: ISBN 9781780374727)
- Notes from a Swing State: Writings from Wales and America (2019, Parthian Books: ISBN 9781912681617)
- Co-edited: Gunne, Sorcha; Thompson, Zoe Brigley, eds. (2010). Feminism, literature and rape narratives : violence and violation. New York: Routledge. ISBN 9780415806084.
