= Nick Makoha =

London-based Ugandan poet

Nick Makoha FRSL
- Born: Uganda
- Education: King's College London (PhD)
- Occupations: Poet, playwright and academic
- Notable work: Kingdom of Gravity; The Dark; The New Carthaginians
- Awards: Brunel University African Poetry Prize; Toi Derricotte & Cornelius Eady Chapbook Prize; Ivan Juritz Prize; International Play Reading Festival; Poetry London Prize
- Website: nickmakoha.com

Dr Nick Makoha FRSL is a Ugandan poet, playwright and academic. His writing has appeared in publications and outlets including The New York Times, Poetry Review, Rialto, Poetry London, Triquarterly Review, Boston Review, Callaloo, and Wasafiri.

== Biography ==
Makoha was born in Uganda, left the country as a young boy with his mother to escape the dictatorship of Idi Amin, and has since lived most of his life in England. Now based in London, he has also lived in Kenya and Saudi Arabia.

He published his first pamphlet, entitled The Lost Collection of an Invisible Man, in 2005. He was part of Malika's Kitchen, the poetry collective co-founded by Malika Booker and Roger Robinson, and went with members of the collective to their first writers' retreat at the Arvon Foundation, where they were tutored by Kwame Dawes and Leone Ross. In 2008, he took part in The Complete Works mentoring programme initiated by Bernardine Evaristo, being mentored by George Szirtes. Szirtes said of his work, which was included in Ten: New Poets, edited by Bernardine Evaristo and Daljit Nagra (Spread the Word, 2010): "There is in Makoha's work an intriguing balance between the immediate and the stately that fits his material and offers possibilities for expansion and further exploration. All that – his personal history, the history of his country and the leaving of it – suggests to me a talent at the beginning of a genuinely important road."

Makoha went on to represent Uganda in the Poetry Parnassus that was part of the 2012 Cultural Olympiad held in London. In 2015, he was joint winner of the Brunel University African Poetry Prize for his chapbook Resurrection Man, which also won the 2016 Toi Derricotte & Cornelius Eady Chapbook Prize.

His first full-length collection, Kingdom of Gravity, was shortlisted for the 2017 Forward Prize for Poetry's "Felix Dennis Prize for Best First Collection". Carol Rumens, in a Guardian review of her best poetry books of the year, wrote that Makoha's work "is charged with ethical sensibility. The lines protest as they sing".

Makoha was the 2019 writer-in-residence for the Wordsworth Trust and Wasafiri. His play The Dark, which draws on his experiences on having to leave Uganda, was shortlisted for the 2019 Alfred Fagon Award, and won the International Play Reading Festival.

Makoha is a graduate fellow of Cave Canem, which was founded by Toi Derricotte and Cornelius Eady in 1996 "with the intuition that African American poets would benefit from having a place of their own in the literary landscape."

Based on the model of Cave Canem, Makoha established the Obsidian Foundation, which helps black poets of African descent advance their writing practices.

He was the winner of the 2021 Ivan Juritz Prize for A Low-Pressure System. The work was described on a blog hosted by King's College London as "a personal journal that resists any fixity, but instead is a series, as Ivan Juritz Prize judge, Will Eaves notes, 'perpetually in flight'. This retelling of the events related to the Entebbe hijacking in 1976 is paralleled against a series of flights from Nick’s own experience, and despite writing through dramatic historical events, his moving voice can be felt strongly throughout."

Also in 2021, he won the Poetry London Prize with "Hollywood Africans".

From November 2022 to April 2023 Makoha was poet-in-residence at the Institute of Contemporary Arts (ICA), where he conducted research into the practice of American painter Jean-Michel Basquiat, both in his own writing and in a series of workshops and events. He also went to the Musée des Beaux-Arts de Montréal to interview Mary-Dailey Desmarais, curator of the exhibition Seeing Loud: Basquiat and Music, organised in collaboration with the Musée de la musique – Philharmonie de Paris.

In February 2023, Makoha delivered the Fourth Verve Poetry Performance Lecture at the Birmingham Hippodrome.

In May 2024, it was announced that Makoha's second poetry collection, The New Carthaginians, had been acquired by Penguin Press. The collection, based on the 1976 Entebbe hijacking, was shortlisted for the 2025 T. S. Eliot Prize.

Makoha was elected to the Royal Society of Literature in 2025. He has a doctorate in Creative Writing from King's College London, where he lectures in Creative Writing.

In November 2025, the Library Of Africa and The African Diaspora (LOATAD) announced Makoha as one of nine recipients of the 2026 LOATAD Black Atlantic Residency in Accra, Ghana, supported by the Hawthornden Foundation, and chosen from more than 300 applicants.

== Works ==
- Lost Collection of an Invisible Man (poetry chapbook), flipped eye publishing, 2005, ISBN 9781905233038
- Kingdom of Gravity (poetry), Peepal Tree Press, 2017, ISBN 9781845233334
- Resurrection Man (poetry), Jai-Alai Books, 2017, ISBN 9781940806082
- The Dark (play), Oberon Books, 2018, ISBN 9781786827036
- "The Metic Experience: A Manifesto", Cambridge Literary Review, issue 11 (Michaelmas 2018), pp. 136–139.
- "Nick Makoha in Conversation with Nuar Alsadir", Wasafiri, 33, no. 3 (2018), 16–21.
- "Nick Makoha's – a low pressure system", Textual Practice, 36:5 (4 May 2022), 630–632.
- "The New Normal: A Manifesto to Create a Safe Space, Free of Racism, for the Black Artist", March 2021. In Michael T. Martin and Gaston Jean-Marie Kaboré (eds), African Cinema: Manifesto and Practice for Cultural Decolonization: Volume 3: The Documentary Record—Declarations, Resolutions, Manifestos, Speeches, Indiana University Press, August 2023 (pp. 655–660), ISBN 9780253066299.
- The New Carthaginians (poetry), Penguin, 2025, ISBN 9781802067064
