= Evaristo Prize for African Poetry =

Annual literary award

The Evaristo Prize for African Poetry is a literary award by the African Poetry Book Fund (APBF) first given in 2013. It was previously called the Brunel International African Poetry Prize sponsored by Brunel University and Bernardine Evaristo. The APBF took over the award and renamed it in 2023.

Brunel International African Poetry Prize was a literary award aimed at the "development, celebration and promotion of poetry from Africa." The prize is sponsored by Brunel University and Bernardine Evaristo. In the past, it has been partnered by Commonwealth Writers and the African Poetry Book Fund USA. It came with a £3,000 honorarium. It was aimed at unpublished poets with a manuscript of ten poems. The prize was founded by British-Nigerian writer Bernardine Evaristo in part to help introduce African poets to readers outside of Africa, saying: "It became clear to me that poetry from the continent could also do with a prize to draw attention to it and to encourage a new generation of poets who might one day become an international presence." She managed the prize from 2011 till 2023.

In 2023, it was renamed to the Evaristo Prize for African Poetry, with an annual prize of US$1,500 awarded.

== Brunel International African Poetry Prize ==
Year	Poet	Nationality	Result
2013	Warsan Shire	Somalia	Winner
2013	Peter Akinlabi	Nigeria	Finalist
2013	Viola Allo	Cameroon	Finalist
2013	Lena Bezawurk Gronland	Ethiopia	Finalist
2013	Kayo Chingonyi	Zambia	Finalist
2013	Chielezona Eze	Nigeria	Finalist
2014	Liyou Libsekal	Ethiopia	Winner
2014	Viola Allo	Cameroon	Finalist
2014	Inua Ellams	Nigeria	Finalist
2014	Amy Lukau	Angola	Finalist
2014	Nick Makoha	Uganda	Finalist
2014	Vuyelwa Maluleke	South Africa	Finalist
2015	Safia Elhillo	Sudan	Winners
2015	Nick Makoha	Uganda	Winners
2015	Inua Ellams	Nigeria	Finalist
2015	Ngwatilo Mayiwoo	Kenya	Finalist
2015	Bernard Matmabo	Zambia	Finalist
2015	Hope Wabuke	Uganda	Finalist
2016	Gbenga Adesina	Nigeria	Winners
2016	Chekwubi O. Danladi	Nigeria	Winners
2016	Victoria-Anne Bulley	Ghana	Finalist
2016	Mary-Alice Daniel	Nigeria	Finalist
2016	Amy Lukau	Angola	Finalist
2016	Ngwatilo Mawiyoo	Kenya	Finalist
2017	Romeo Oriogun	Nigeria	Winner
2017	Leila Chatti	Tunisia	Finalist
2017	Kayo Chingonyi	Zambia	Finalist
2017	Saddiq Dzukogi	Nigeria	Finalist
2017	Yalie Kamara	Sierra Leone	Finalist
2017	Nick Makoha	Uganda	Finalist
2017	Rasaq Maliq	Nigeria	Finalist
2017	Kechi Nomu	Nigeria	Finalist
2018	Hiwot Adilow	Ethiopia	Winners
2018	Theresa Lola	Nigeria	Winners
2018	Momtaza Mehri	Somalia	Winners
2018	Michelle Angwenyi	Kenya	Finalist
2018	Dalia Elhassan	Sudan	Finalist
2018	Nour Kamel	Egypt	Finalist
2018	Saradha Soobrayen	Mauritius	Finalist
2018	Cheswayo Mphanza	Zambia	Finalist
2019	Nadra Mabrouk	Egypt	Winners
2019	Jamila Osman	Somalia	Winners
2019	Afua Ansong	Ghana	Finalist
2019	Mary-Alice Daniel	Nigeria	Finalist
2019	Inua Ellams	Nigeria	Finalist
2019	K. Eltinae	Sudan	Finalist
2019	Omotara James	Nigeria	Finalist
2019	Selina Nwulu	Nigeria	Finalist
2019	Emmanuel Oppong	Ghana	Finalist
2019	Sherry Shenoda	Egypt	Finalist
2020	Rabha Ashry	Egypt	Winner
2020	Akosua Afiriyie-Hwedie	Zambia	Finalist
2020	Inua Ellams	Nigeria	Finalist
2020	Amanda Holiday	Sierra Leone	Finalist
2020	Nour Kamel	Egypt	Finalist
2020	Saradha Soobrayen	Mauritius	Finalist
2021	Othuke Umukoro	Nigeria	Winner
2021	Kweku Abimbola	Gambia	Finalist
2021	Arao Ameny	Uganda	Finalist
2021	Isabelle Baafi	South Africa	Finalist
2021	Asmaa Jama	Somalia	Finalist
2021	Tumello Motabola	Lesotho	Finalist
2021	Oluwadare Popoola	Nigeria	Finalist
2021	Yomi Sode	Nigeria	Finalist
2022	Zibusiso Mpofu	Zimbabwe	Winner
2022	Conor Cogill	South Africa	Finalist
2022	Asmaa Jama	Somalia	Finalist
2022	Edil Hassan	Somalia	Finalist
2022	Fahad Al-Amoudi	Ethiopia	Finalist
2022	Adedayo Agaru	Nigeria	Finalist
2022	Chisom Okafor	Nigeria	Finalist

== Evaristo Prize for African Poetry ==
Year	Poet	Nationality	Result
2023	Feranmi Ariyo	Nigeria	Winners
	Gracia Mwamba	Congo	Winners
	Claudia Owusu	Ghana	Finalist
	KÁNYIN Olorunnisola	Nigeria	Finalist
	Abu Bakr Sadiq	Nigeria	Finalist
	Sarpong Osei Asamoah	Ghana	Finalist
