= Cultureword =

Writing development organisation

Cultureword (1975–present), formerly known as Commonword, is a writing development organisation based in Ancoats, Manchester, North West England, providing opportunities for new and aspiring writers to develop their talent and potential, promoting new writing on national and international levels. It is currently the largest new writing, community writing and publishing organisation in the North West. It is a limited company and registered charity, and is Arts Council funded. It has published writers such as Lemn Sissay. Rosie Garland, Sherry Ashworth and Zahid Hussain. Activist and writer Deyika Nzeribe was a former chair.

== History ==
Cultureword was initially founded as Commonword, a writing workshop and community publisher of working-class writing in Manchester. Greg Wilkinson was one of the organisation's founder members and worked on the grassroots oral history project Lifetimes in Partington, an overspill development in Manchester.

In 1986, Commonword established a centre for black and Asian creative writing known as Cultureword. Lemn Sissay worked at the organisation as Cultureword's literature worker and convenor of the "Tight Fisted Poets" group, nurturing new writing talent among many of Manchester's writers of colour. This objective remains fundamental to the organisation's stance to this day. To reflect this, Commonword adopted the Cultureword name for the whole organisation on 27 May 2025.

== Activities ==
Cultureword runs writers' groups, workshops, events, conferences and competitions to further its aims. Writer Adam Lowe has said, "Cultureword is always the first and last word on writer development in Greater Manchester."

=== Identity ===
Identity, Cultureword's weekly group for black and Asian writers, has been running since the late 1980s. Identity Live! is the performance side of the group.

=== Young Identity ===
Young Identity (also known as YI) was created in 2006 by Shirley May and Ali Gadema, and is a spoken-word collective aimed at younger writers, aged 13–25. Young Identity has performed all over the United Kingdom, working with a diverse range of writers including Saul Williams, Linton Kwesi Johnson, Ted Hughes Prize Winner Kae Tempest and the late Amiri Baraka.

=== Black and Asian Writers Conference ===
In association with the Manchester Literature Festival, Cultureword holds the biannual Black and Asian Writers Conference, which aims to highlight the lack of diversity within the publishing industry and encompasses a series of talks, workshops and interviews. Among speakers featured in 2016 were Nii Parkes, Sandeep Parmar and JJ Bola, on wide-ranging topics that included "Writing in Translation: What makes for a good translation?", "Young Writers: How does Generation Y's writing differ from Generation X's?" and "Black and Dangerous: BAME representation of mental health in writing", the conference concluding with an event headlined by Lemn Sissay.

=== Ghosts ===
In 2011, Cultureword launched Ghosts, a project funded by the National Heritage Lottery Fund to capture the social history of Manchester clubs in Moss Side and Hulme from the 1950 until the 1980s such as The Nile and The Reno.

== Publications ==
Cultureword has previously published work by Rosie Garland, Lemn Sissay, Zahid Hussain and Sherry Ashworth.

=== Crocus Books ===
Crocus is the Cultureword's publishing imprint. It publishes works of fiction and poetry written by authors from the northwest of England.

== Prizes and competitions ==
=== Superheroes of Slam ===
From the late 2000s Cultureword ran Superheroes of Slam, a slam poetry competition for the Diké Omeje Slam Poetry Award. Previous winners include Dominic Berry, Mark Mace Smith, Ben Mellor, Joy France and Paris Kaur.

=== Children's Diversity Writing Prize ===
Cultureword launched the annual Commonword Children's Diversity Writing Prize in 2011.
