= Zahid Hussain (writer) =

British writer and poet

Zahid Hussain (born 6 March 1972) is a British fiction writer, poet and politician. His debut novel The Curry Mile (2006) was published by Suitcase Press, a Manchester-based publishing house. Hussain explores social and ethical issues in his writing.

== Early life and education ==
Hussain was born in Darwen, Lancashire to Pakistani parents and grew up in Blackburn speaking Urdu, Punjabi, and English. His father is of Mirpuri origin from Azad Kashmir, while is mother is of Pashtun origin from Khyber Pakhtunkhwa. He has a European IT degree from Sheffield Hallam University and postgraduate management qualifications from the universities of Bournemouth, Barcelona, Poitiers and Bordeaux.

== Politics ==
Since 2021 Hussain has been a councillor on Manchester City Council, representing the Levenshulme ward for the Labour Party.

== Literature ==
Hussain is chair of the trustees of Manchester City of Literature. He is a winner of the North West Poetry Slam.

== Selected publications ==
- Hussain, Zahid (2007). "Contours of an Islamic political economy". In Atherton, John; Skinner, Hannah (eds.). Through the eye of a needle : theological conversations over political economy. Peterborough, UK: Epworth. ISBN 9780716206262.
- Hussain, Zahid (2006). The Curry Mile. Manchester: Suitcase. ISBN 9781905778003.
