= Flipped eye publishing =

Not-for-profit publishing company

- Parent company: None
- Status: Active
- Founded: 2001; 25 years ago
- Founder: Nii Ayikwei Parkes, J. A. Parkes
- Country of origin: UK & Ghana
- Headquarters location: London
- Key people: Nii Ayikwei Parkes, (Senior Editor); Niall O'Sullivan, (Senior Poetry Editor); Jacob Sam-La Rose, (Senior Poetry Editor); Mitchell Albert, (Editorial Director, Fiction)
- Publication types: Books, Magazines
- Imprints: flipped eye, Lubin & Kleyner, phipl
- No. of employees: 9
- Official website: flippedeye.net

Founded in 2001 by Nii Ayikwei Parkes and J. A. Parkes, flipped eye publishing is a company that publishes original poetry and prose on a not-for-profit model. The not-for-profit approach has allowed flipped eye to focus on new writers with potential, prioritising development, thus facilitating the emergence of truly unique literary talent. The company's editorial focus is on work that is "clear and true rather than exhibitionist," but is not averse to publishing work that might be considered experimental, such as Niki Aguirre's apocalyptic 29 Ways to Drown, which was longlisted for the 2008 Frank O'Connor International Short Story Award.

Among the better known writers first published by flipped eye are Malika Booker, Inua Ellams, Warsan Shire, Ekere Tallie, Jacob Sam-La Rose, Niall O'Sullivan, AJ Odasso, and Leila Segal – in a list that illustrates the significant percentage of female writers and British writers of Black and minority ethnic heritage that the company has published. In addition to its imprints, the company operates a number of distinct publishing series: mouthmark series (ended in 2011), flap series (ongoing series for poetry pamphlets) and defeye (for theatre and non-traditional formats).

== Editorial style ==
All of flipped eye publishing's current editors are from non-traditional editing backgrounds; none of them studied literature or trained within the publishing establishment before taking on their roles. They place an emphasis on the importance of listening in the writing and editing process, with senior editor Nii Ayikwei Parkes, a science graduate, having declared in an interview: "Language is music; when you write on paper it's dead, it comes to life when spoken." None the less, there is an emphasis on craft and an active engagement with form, where appropriate.

Poetry editor Niall O'Sullivan has a number of online projects exploring form and in his lecturing work, "teaches his students to make silences speak, neither reaching for quick laughs, nor deflecting judgment by writing verse "steeped in righteousness". Jacob Sam-La Rose, a seasoned performer who runs several programmes mentoring young writers and performers, is also a poetry editor with flipped eye. He was shortlisted for both the Forward Prize and the Fenton Aldeburgh Prize for his first full collection, Breaking Silence, demonstrating a versatility in writing and performance that is reflected in his editorial work. The guiding notion of listening does not appear to limit the sources of the work that flipped eye publishes. They have published concept-driven work from poets such as Max Wallis, narrative-led poetry by Roger Robinson, poetry that rejoices in the possibilities and sounds of language by the likes of Inua Ellams and highly experimental work such as Martin De Mello's if our love stays above the waist.

They also publish fiction, primarily short story collections, but have published one novel, Heritage of Secrets by Aoife Mannix. According to Parkes, "all that is written was first spoken so we acknowledge the value of oral influences in our editorial approach". He also states; "I'm interested in hybridity and the work it creates."

flipped eye publishing's most famous release is now Warsan Shire's Teaching My Mother How To Give Birth (2011), which has gained significant traction in sales since the author collaborated with Beyoncé on the visual album Lemonade.

== Awards and recognition ==
- 2006
  - IPG Diversity Award: whole company (Shortlisted);
  - PBS Pamphlet Choice: Communion by Jacob Sam-La Rose (Winner, Summer)
- 2007
  - PBS Pamphlet Choice: White Narcissi by Denise Saul (Winner, Winter)
- 2008
  - Frank O'Connor International Short Story Award: 29 Ways to Drown by Niki Aguirre (Longlisted)
- 2009
  - UK Young Publishing Entrepreneur Award: Nii Ayikwei Parkes (finalist)
  - Edinburgh Fringe First Award: The 14th Tale by Inua Ellams, rights sold to Oberon Books in 2015 (winner)
  - Peoples Book Prize: Heritage of Secrets by Aoife Mannix (Winner, July)
- 2010
  - London New Poetry Award: Lost Books by AJ Odasso (Nominated)
  - People’s Book Prize: Lost Books by AJ Odasso (Winner, Winter)
  - Redbridge Council's Big Red Read: Suckle by Roger Robinson (Selected)
- 2012
  - Polari Prize: Modern Love by Max Wallis (Shortlisted)
- 2013
  - PBS Pamphlet Choice: Inklings by Sarah Westcott (Winner, Winter)
- 2014
  - Michael Marks Publishers' Award: whole company (Shortlisted)
- 2015
  - PBS Pamphlet Choice: Where We’re Going We Don’t Need Roads by Amy Acre (Winner, Spring)
  - Michael Marks Award: Advice for an Only Child by Anja Konig (Shortlisted)
- 2019
  - PBS Recommendation: Deluge by Charlotte Ansell (Winner, Winter)
- 2021
  - PBS Pamphlet Choice: Portrait of Colossus by Samatar Elmi (Winner, Summer)
- 2022
  - PBS Recommendation: Bless the Daughter Raised by a Voice in Her Head by Warsan Shire, licensed to Chatto & Windus (Winner, Winter)
