= Marvin Thompson =

Welsh writer

- Born: 1977 or 1978 (age 48–49); London, England
- Occupation: Teacher
- Writing career
- Genre: Poetry
- Notable awards: National Poetry Competition, 2020

Marvin Thompson (born 1977 or 1978) is a British writer living in Wales. His poem "The Fruit of the Spirit is Love (Galatians 5:22)" won the National Poetry Competition 2020, announced in March 2021.

== Biography ==
Marvin Thompson was born in London, England, to Jamaican parents and now lives in Torfaen, Wales.

Thompson's debut poetry collection Road Trip was published by Peepal Tree Press in 2020. Described by The Guardian as an "invigorating journey through complexities of black British family life", the collection was selected as one of The Telegraph's Poetry Books of the Year, and was nominated for the Wales Book of the Year 2021.

In March 2021, Thompson won the National Poetry Competition 2020 with his poem "The Fruit of the Spirit is Love (Galatians 5:22)", dedicating his win to his children, his parents and "anyone who has felt discrimination pressing on their ribs; air being squeezed out of their lungs." The bible verse referenced reads "But the fruit of the Spirit is love, joy, peace, longsuffering, gentleness, goodness, faith" in the King James Version.

Alongside Zoë Brigley, Thompson was appointed as joint editor of Poetry Wales magazine in August 2021. However, Thompson stepped down from the role three weeks later.

== Bibliography ==
=== Poetry ===
- Road Trip (2020, Peepal Tree Press; ISBN 9781845234607)
