= Warsan Shire =

British writer, poet, editor and teacher (born 1988)

- Born: 1 August 1988 (age 38); Kenya
- Occupations: Poet, writer
- Writing career
- Notable works: Teaching My Mother How To Give Birth (2011); Bless the Daughter Raised by a Voice in Her Head: Poems (2022)
- Notable awards: Brunel University African Poetry Prize; Young Poet Laureate for London
- Website: WarsanShire.squarespace.com

Warsan Shire FRSL (born 1 August 1988) is a British writer, poet, editor, and teacher who was born to Somali parents in Kenya. In 2013, she was awarded the inaugural Brunel University African Poetry Prize.

== Early life and education ==
Born on 1 August 1988 in Kenya to Somali parents, Shire migrated with her family to the United Kingdom at the age of one. She has four siblings. She studied creative writing at London Metropolitan University, graduating with a Bachelor of Arts degree in 2010.

== Career ==
In 2011, she released Teaching My Mother How to Give Birth, a poetry pamphlet published by flipped eye. A full collection of hers was released in 2016, also through flipped eye. Shire was mentored through The Complete Works programme for poets of colour.

Shire has read her poetry in various artistic venues throughout the world, including in the United Kingdom, Italy, Germany, North America, South Africa, and Kenya. Her poems have been published in various literary publications, including The Poetry Review, Magma, and Wasafiri. Shire's poems have been featured in the collections Salt Book of Younger Poets (Salt, 2011), Ten: The New Wave (Bloodaxe, 2014), and New Daughters of Africa (edited by Margaret Busby, 2019). Her poetry has been translated into a number of languages, including Italian, Spanish, Portuguese, Swedish, Danish, and Estonian.

Shire put out a limited-release pamphlet called Her Blue Body in 2015. She serves as the poetry editor at Spook magazine and teaches poetry workshops globally.

Shire's poetry featured prominently in Beyoncé's 2016 feature-length film Lemonade. Beyoncé's interest in Shire's work was sparked by Shire's piece "For Women Who Are Difficult to Love". Beyoncé again featured Shire's poetry in her 2020 musical film Black Is King.

Shire published her first full-length poetry collection, Bless the Daughter Raised by a Voice in Her Head: Poems, on 1 March 2022. Shire was interviewed on NPR's Weekend Edition Sunday by Sarah McCammon on 27 February 2022 about the book.

== Influences ==
Shire draws on the personal experiences from her own life and the lives of people with whom she is close. She writes about and for people whose voices are generally not heard, like immigrants and refugees as well as other marginalized people. Shire is also quoted as saying: "I also navigate a lot through memory, my memories and other people's memories, trying to essentially just make sense of stuff." As a first-generation immigrant, she has used her poetry to connect with her home country of Somalia, which she has never visited but which she describes as "a nation of poets." Her words "No one leaves home unless / home is the mouth of a shark," from the poem Home "Conversations about home (at a deportation centre)", have been called "a rallying call for refugees and their advocates."

Shire has named writer Toni Morrison as one of her influences.

== Awards and honours ==
In April 2013, Shire was presented with Brunel University's inaugural African Poetry Prize, an award for poets who have yet to publish a full-length poetry collection. She was chosen from a shortlist of six candidates out of a total 655 entries.

In October 2013, Shire was selected from a shortlist of six as the first Young Poet Laureate for London. The honour is part of the London Legacy Development Corporation's Spoke programme, which focuses on promoting arts and culture in Queen Elizabeth Olympic Park and the surrounding area.

In 2014, Shire was chosen as poet-in-residence of Queensland, Australia, liaising with the Aboriginal Centre for the Performing Arts over a six-week period.

In June 2018, Shire was elected Fellow of the Royal Society of Literature for its "40 Under 40" initiative.

Bless the Daughter Raised by a Voice in Her Head was shortlisted for the 2022 Felix Dennis Prize for Best First Collection and the 2023 Dylan Thomas Prize and appeared on the longlist for the 2023 Griffin Poetry Prize.

== Personal life ==
She lives in Los Angeles, California, with her husband, Andres Reyes-Manzo, and their two young children.

== Publications ==
- —— (2011). Teaching My Mother How to Give Birth. flipped eye. ISBN 9781905233298.
- —— (2015). Her Blue Body. flipped eye. ISBN 9781905233489.
- ——; Booker, Malika; Olds, Sharon (2017). Penguin Modern Poets 3: Your Family, Your Body. Penguin Books. ISBN 9780141984025.
- —— (2022). Bless the Daughter Raised by a Voice in Her Head: Poems. Random House. ISBN 9780593134351.

=== Poetry in film ===
- Poems including "The Unbearable Weight of Staying", "Dear Moon", "How to Wear Your Mother's Lipstick", "Nail Technician as Palm Reader", and "For Women Who Are Difficult to Love" featured on Lemonade (2016), a visual album by Beyoncé.

== See also ==
- Unless the Water Is Safer than the Land
