= Andrew McMillan (poet) =

English poet (born 1988)

Andrew McMillan MBE FRSL
- Born: 28 October 1988; South Yorkshire, England
- Education: University of Lancaster; University College London
- Occupations: Poet, professor
- Writing career
- Genre: Poetry Literary Fiction
- Notable works: physical playtime Pity
- Notable awards: Eric Gregory Award; Guardian First Book Award; Somerset Maugham Award
- Website: Andrew McMillan

Andrew McMillan MBE FRSL (born 1988) is an English poet and professor.

== Biography ==
McMillan was born near Barnsley, South Yorkshire. He is the son of poet Ian McMillan. He studied at University of Lancaster, and then at University College London, and is now Professor of Contemporary Writing at Manchester Metropolitan University.

His debut collection, Physical, was published by Jonathan Cape in 2015. It was the first collection of poems to win the Guardian First Book Award, and also won a Somerset Maugham Award and the Fenton Aldeburgh First Collection Prize.

His second collection, playtime, was published by Jonathan Cape in 2018, and won the inaugural Polari Prize. With Mary Jean Chan, McMillan was co-editor of the 2022 collection "100 Queer Poems".

He was elected a Fellow of the Royal Society of Literature in 2020.

His first novel, Pity, was published by Canongate Books in 2024, and was longlisted for the Dylan Thomas Prize.

McMillan lives in Manchester.

He was appointed Member of the Order of the British Empire (MBE) in the 2026 New Year Honours for services to Literature.

== Bibliography ==
- Pity (2024)
- 100 Queer Poems (co-editor), (2022)
- pandemonium (2021)
- playtime (2018)
- physical (2015)
