= Costa Book Award for Poetry =

Annual literary award for English-language poetry

The Costa Book Award for Poetry, formerly known as the Whitbread Award (1971–2006), was an annual literary award for poetry collections, part of the Costa Book Awards. The award concluded in 2022.

== Recipients ==
Costa Books of the Year are distinguished with a bold font and a blue ribbon. Award winners are listed in bold.

Costa Book Award for Poetry winners and finalists
Year	Author	Title	Result	Ref.
1971	Geoffrey Hill	Mercian Hymns	Winner	
No award presented 1972-1984
1985	Douglas Dunn	Elegies	Winner	
1986	Peter Reading	Stet	Winner	
1987	Seamus Heaney	The Haw Lantern	Winner	
1988	Peter Porter	The Automatic Oracle	Winner	
1989	Michael Donaghy	Shibboleth	Winner	
1990	Paul Durcan	Daddy, Daddy	Winner	
1991	Michael Longley	Gorse Fires	Winner	
1992	Tony Harrison	The Gaze of the Gorgon	Winner	
1993	Carol Ann Duffy	Mean Time	Winner	
1994	James Fenton	Out of Danger	Winner	
1995	Bernard O'Donoghue	Gunpowder	Winner	
1995	Simon Armitage	The Dead Sea Poems	Shortlist	
1995	Tony Harrison	The Shadow of Hiroshima and other film/poems	Shortlist	
1995	Glyn Maxwell	Rest for the Wicked	Shortlist	
1996	Seamus Heaney	The Spirit Level	Winner	
1996	U. A. Fanthorpe	Safe as Houses	Shortlist	
1996	Alice Oswald	The Thing in the Gap-Stone Stile	Shortlist	
1996	Christopher Reid	Expanded Universes	Shortlist	
1996	Pauline Stainer	The Wound-dresser's Dream	Shortlist	
1997	Ted Hughes	Tales from Ovid	Winner	
1997	Simon Armitage	CloudCuckooLand	Shortlist	
1997	Selima Hill	Sugar-Paper blue Violet	Shortlist	
1997	Christopher Reid	Expanded Universes	Shortlist	
1997	Peter Redgrove	Assembling a Ghost	Shortlist	
1998	Ted Hughes	Birthday Letters	Winner	
1998	Philip Gross	The Wasting Game	Shortlist	
1998	Paul Farley	The Boy from the Chemist is Here to See you	Shortlist	
1999	Seamus Heaney	Beowulf: A New Verse Translation	Winner	
1999	Michael Hofmann	Approximately Nowhere	Shortlist	
1999	Ted Hughes	Alcestis	Shortlist	
1999	Don Paterson	The Eyes	Shortlist	
2000	John Burnside	The Asylum Dance	Winner	
2000	Michael Donaghy	Conjure	Shortlist	
2000	R F Langley	Collected Poems	Shortlist	
2000	Anne Stevenson	Granny Scarecrow	Shortlist	
2000	Maurice Riordan	Floods	Shortlist	
2001	Selima Hill	Bunny	Winner	
2001	Charles Boyle	The Age of Cardboard and String	Shortlist	
2001	Wendy Cope	If I don't know	Shortlist	
2001	John Stammers	Panoramic Lounge-Bar	Shortlist	
2002	Paul Farley	The Ice Age	Winner	
2002	David Constantine	Something for the Ghosts	Shortlist	
2002	Ruth Padel	Voodoo Shop	Shortlist	
2002	Sheenagh Pugh	The Beautiful Lie	Shortlist	
2003	Don Paterson	Landing Light	Winner	
2003	Lavinia Greenlaw	Minsk	Shortlist	
2003	Jamie McKendrick	Ink Stone	Shortlist	
2003	Jean Sprackland	Hard Water	Shortlist	
2004	Michael Symmons Roberts	Corpus	Winner	
2004	Leontia Flynn	These Days	Shortlist	
2004	John Fuller	Ghosts	Shortlist	
2004	Matthew Hollis	Ground Water	Shortlist	
2004	Michael Symmons Roberts	Corpus	Shortlist	
2005	Christopher Logue	Cold Calls	Winner	
2005	David Harsent	Legion	Shortlist	
2005	Richard Price	Lucky Day	Shortlist	
2005	Jane Yeh	Marabou	Shortlist	
2006	John Haynes	Letter to Patience	Winner	
2006	Vicki Feaver	The Book of Blood	Shortlist	
2006	Seamus Heaney	District and Circle	Shortlist	
2006	Hugo Williams	Dear Room	Shortlist	
2007	Jean Sprackland	Tilt	Winner	
2007	Ian Duhig	The Speed of Dark	Shortlist	
2007	John Fuller	The Space of Joy	Shortlist	
2007	Daljit Nagra	Look We Have Coming to Dover!	Shortlist	
2008	Adam Foulds	The Broken Word	Winner	
2008	Ciarán Carson	For All We Know	Shortlist	
2008	Kathryn Simmonds	Sunday at the Skin Launderette	Shortlist	
2008	Greta Stoddart	Salvation Jane	Shortlist	
2009	Christopher Reid	A Scattering	Winner	
2009	Clive James	Angels Over Elsinore	Shortlist	
2009	Katharine Kilalea	One Eye'd Leigh	Shortlist	
2009	Ruth Padel	Darwin: A Life in Poems	Shortlist	
2010	Jo Shapcott	Of Mutability	Winner	
2010	Roy Fisher	Standard Midland	Shortlist	
2010	Robin Robertson	The Wrecking Light	Shortlist	
2010	Sam Willetts	New Light for the Old Dark	Shortlist	
2011	Carol Ann Duffy	The Bees	Winner	
2011	David Harsent	Night	Shortlist	
2011	Jackie Kay	Fiere	Shortlist	
2011	Sean O'Brien	November	Shortlist	
2012	Kathleen Jamie	The Overhaul	Winner	
2012	Sean Borodale	Bee Journal	Shortlist	
2012	Julia Copus	The World's Two Smallest Humans	Shortlist	
2012	Selima Hill	People Who Like Meatballs	Shortlist	
2013	Michael Symmons Roberts	Drysalter	Winner	
2013	Clive James	Dante, The Divine Comedy	Shortlist	
2013	Helen Mort	Division Street	Shortlist	
2013	Robin Robertson	Hill of Doors	Shortlist	
2014	Jonathan Edwards	My Family and Other Superheroes	Winner	
2014	Colette Bryce	The Whole and Rain-domed Universe	Shortlist	
2014	Lavinia Greenlaw	A Double Sorrow: Troilus and Criseyde	Shortlist	
2014	Kei Miller	The Cartographer Tries to Map a Way to Zion	Shortlist	
2015	Don Paterson	40 Sonnets	Winner	
2015	Andrew McMillan	Physical	Shortlist	
2015	Kate Miller	The Observances	Shortlist	
2015	Neil Rollinson	Talking Dead	Shortlist	
2016	Alice Oswald	Falling Awake	Winner	
2016	Melissa Lee-Houghton		Shortlist	
2016	Denise Riley		Shortlist	
2016	Kae Tempest		Shortlist	
2017	Helen Dunmore	Inside the Wave	Winner	
2017	Kayo Chingonyi	Kumukanda	Shortlist	
2017	Sinéad Morrissey	On Balance	Shortlist	
2017	Richard Osmond	Useful Verses	Shortlist	
2018	J. O. Morgan	Assurances	Winner	
2018	Zaffar Kunial	Us	Shortlist	
2018	Richard Scott	Soho	Shortlist	
2018	Hannah Sullivan	Three Poems	Shortlist	
2019	Mary Jean Chan	Flèche	Winner	
2019	Jay Bernard	Surge	Shortlist	
2019	Paul Farley	The Mizzy	Shortlist	
2019	John McCullough	Reckless Paper Birds	Shortlist	
2020	Eavan Boland	The Historians	Winner	
2020	Caroline Bird	The Air Year	Shortlist	
2020	Rachel Long	My Darling from the Lions	Shortlist	
2020	Martha Sprackland	Citadel	Shortlist	
2021	Hannah Lowe	The Kids	Winner	
2021	Raymond Antrobus	All the Names Given	Shortlist	
2021	Kayo Chingonyi	A Blood Condition	Shortlist	
2021	Victoria Kennefick	Eat or We Both Starve	Shortlist	
