= Bette Howland =

- Born: Bette Lew Sotonoff; January 28, 1937; Chicago, Illinois, U.S.
- Died: December 13, 2017 (aged 80); Tulsa, Oklahoma, U.S.
- Occupations: Writer; literary critic
- Spouse: Howard Howland (m. 1956, divorced)
- Children: 2
- Parent(s): Sam Sotonoff; Jessie Berger

Bette Howland (January 28, 1937 – December 13, 2017) was an American writer and literary critic. She wrote for Commentary Magazine.

== Biography ==
Born Bette Lee Sotonoff to Sam Sotonoff, a machinist, and Jessie Berger, a homemaker, she focused much of her work on her native Chicago, though she left the city in 1975.

In 1956, she married Howard Howland, a biologist. The couple had two sons but later separated and divorced, though she kept his surname. She worked as a librarian and did editorial work for the University of Chicago Press. She was a protegee, and sometime lover, of Saul Bellow.

Howland died on December 13, 2017, in Tulsa, Oklahoma, aged 80, while living near one of her sons, the philosopher Jacob Howland.

== Critical reappraisal ==
In 2013 editor Brigid Hughes found Howland's book W-3 and decided to include some of Howland's work in an issue of the literary journal A Public Space dedicated to obscure and forgotten women writers.

A Public Space eventually decided to publish some of Howland's stories through their imprint in 2019, under the title Calm Sea and Prosperous Voyage.

== Awards ==
- 1978: Guggenheim Fellow
- 1984: MacArthur Fellows Program
- 2022: Inductee in the Chicago Literary Hall of Fame.

== Works ==
=== Books ===
- W-3, Viking Press, 1974; ISBN 978-0-670-74863-1
- Blue in Chicago, Harper & Row, 1978; ISBN 978-0-06-011957-7
- Things to Come and Go: Three Stories, Knopf, 1983; ISBN 978-0-394-53032-1
- Calm Sea and Prosperous Voyage, Brooklyn, NY : A Public Space Books, 2019, ISBN 978-0-9982675-0-0

=== Short stories ===
Title	Publication	Collected in
"Julia"	Quarterly Review of Literature 9.4 (1958)	-
"Sam Katz"	Epoch 9.2 (Fall 1958)	-
"Aronesti"	The Noble Savage 5 (1962)	Calm Sea and Prosperous Voyage
"Public Facilities"	Commentary (February 1972)	Blue in Chicago
"Blue in Chicago"	Commentary (August 1972)	Blue in Chicago
"To the Country"	Commentary (November 1973)	Blue in Chicago
"Golden Age"	Commentary (April 1975)	Blue in Chicago
"Twenty-Sixth and California"	Blue in Chicago (1978)	Blue in Chicago
"How We Got the Old Woman to Go"	Blue in Chicago (1978)	Blue in Chicago
"The Life You Gave Me"	Commentary (August 1982)	Things to Come and Go
"Birds of a Feather"	Things to Come and Go (1983)	Things to Come and Go
"The Old Wheeze"	Things to Come and Go (1983)	Things to Come and Go
"Power Failure"	The American Voice 1 (1985)	Calm Sea and Prosperous Voyage
"Calm Sea and Prosperous Voyage"	TriQuarterly 104 (Winter 1999)	Calm Sea and Prosperous Voyage
"Mengele's Leg"	Confrontation 101 (Spring/Summer 2008)	-
"A Visit"	A Public Space 23 (2015)	Calm Sea and Prosperous Voyage
"German Lessons"	Calm Sea and Prosperous Voyage (2019)	Calm Sea and Prosperous Voyage
