= Mary Jean Chan =

Hong Kong-Chinese poet and writer

Mary Jean Chan (陳瓊瑪)
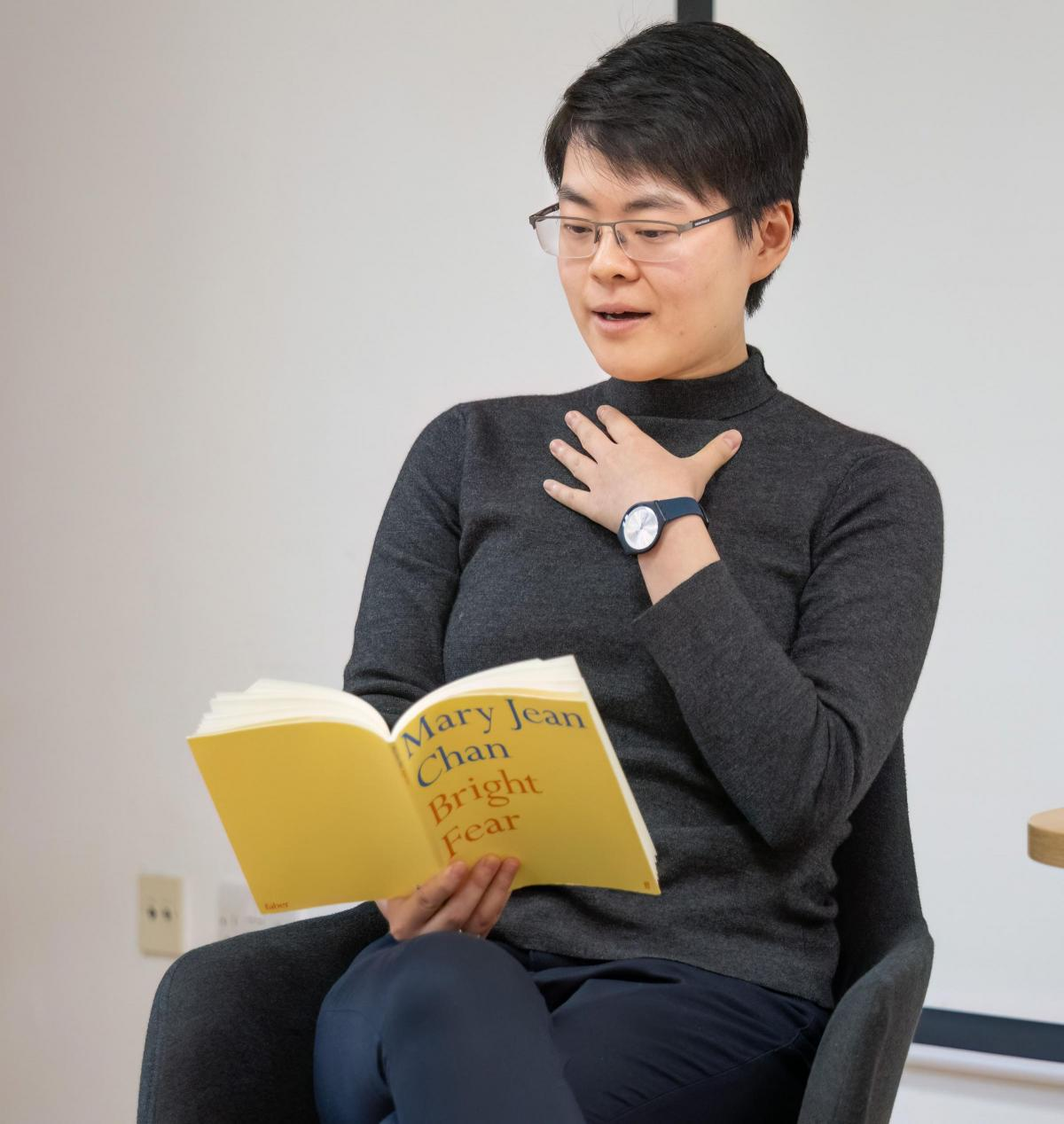
- Born: 1990 (age 35–36); Hong Kong
- Education: Royal Holloway; University of Oxford; Swarthmore College
- Occupations: Poet, lecturer, editor, critic
- Writing career
- Genre: Poetry
- Notable works: Flèche, Bright Fear
- Notable awards: Costa Book Awards; Eric Gregory Award
- Website: www.maryjeanchan.com

Dr Mary Jean Chan is a Hong Kong-Chinese poet, lecturer, editor and critic whose debut poetry collection, Flèche (Faber & Faber, 2019), won the 2019 Costa Book Award for Poetry. Chan's second book, Bright Fear, was published by Faber in 2023. Chan served as a judge for the 2023 Booker Prize and the 2025 Dylan Thomas Prize.

== Biography ==
Mary Jean Chan was born in 1990 and was raised in Hong Kong. Chan graduated Phi Beta Kappa from Swarthmore College in 2012 with a BA in Political Science. Chan obtained an MPhil from Oxford in International Development and completed an MA and a PhD in Creative Writing at Royal Holloway, University of London.

In 2018, Chan's pamphlet, A Hurry of English, was published by ignitionpress and was chosen as a Poetry Book Society Summer Pamphlet Choice. Chan's debut poetry collection Flèche was published by Faber & Faber (2019). It was chosen as a Poetry Book Society Autumn Recommendation. The book won the Costa Book Award for Poetry in 2019.

In 2019, Chan was named as one of Jackie Kay's 10 Best BAME Writers in Britain, with Kay describing Chan's poetry as "psychologically astute and culturally complex."

Chan's second collection, Bright Fear, was shortlisted for the 2023 Forward Prize for Best Collection, the 2024 International Dylan Thomas Prize and the 2024 Writers' Prize.

Chan was Senior Lecturer in Creative Writing (Poetry) at Oxford Brookes University from 2020 till 2023. Chan is a Departmental Lecturer in Poetry on the MSt in Creative Writing at the University of Oxford after serving as the 2023–24 Judith E. Wilson Poetry Fellow at the University of Cambridge.

== Awards ==
Year	Title	Award	Category	Result	Ref
2017	—	National Poetry Competition	—	Second Place	
2017	—	The Poetry Society Anne Born Prize	—	Won	
2017	—	Forward Prizes for Poetry	Single Poem	Shortlisted	
2018	—	The Poetry Society Geoffrey Dearmer Award	—	Won	
2019	—	Forward Prizes for Poetry	Single Poem	Shortlisted	
2019	A Hurry of English	Eric Gregory Award	—	Won	
2019	Flèche	Costa Book Award	Poetry	Won	
2020	Flèche	Dylan Thomas Prize	—	Shortlisted	
2020	Flèche	Jhalak Prize	—	Shortlisted	
2020	Flèche	John Pollard Foundation International Poetry Prize	—	Shortlisted	
2020	Flèche	Seamus Heaney Centre First Collection Prize	—	Shortlisted	
2021	Flèche	Lambda Literary Awards	Lesbian Poetry	Shortlisted	
2022	100 Queer Poems	Books Are My Bag Readers' Awards	—	Shortlisted	
2023	Bright Fear	Forward Prizes for Poetry	Collection	Shortlisted	
2024	Bright Fear	Dylan Thomas Prize	—	Shortlisted	
2024	Bright Fear	The Folio Prize	—	Shortlisted	
2024	Bright Fear	Jhalak Prize	—	Longlisted	

== Bibliography ==
- —— (2018). A Hurry of English. ignitionpress.
- —— (2019). Flèche. Faber & Faber.
- —— (2023). Bright Fear. Faber & Faber.
- ——; Bernard, Jay; Harris, Will; Ramayya, Nisha (2024). Siblings. Monitor Books.

=== Edited works ===
- Chan, Mary Jean; McMillan, Andrew, eds. (2022). 100 Queer Poems. Vintage.
