= The Complete Works (poetry) =

UK development programme for Black and Asian poets

The Complete Works was a national development programme for Black and Asian poets in England, 2008–2020, created on the initiative of Bernardine Evaristo, which mentored many major prizewinners and went on to inspire similar schemes.

== History and purpose ==
The Complete Works: Poetry was an initiative of Bernardine Evaristo to tackle the underrepresentation of poets of colour in UK poetry in the early years of the 21st century as revealed by the Free Verse Report in 2005. Evaristo stated that "publishers simply weren't publishing poets of colour."

The programme was directed by Dr Nathalie Tetlier, an academic and poet, with funding from the Arts Council of England. Every four years, ten Black and Asian UK poets at the beginning of their careers were selected and offered a programme of mentoring, seminars, literature retreats and publication in a Bloodaxe anthology. Mentors included Caleb Femi and Liz Berry.

The Complete Works Diversity in UK Poetry Conference was held in Goldsmiths University London in November 2017.

Over the period of the programme, publication of poets of colour increased. Complete Works Fellows won three Forward Prizes, two T. S. Eliot Prizes, two Ted Hughes Awards, two Sunday Times Young Writer of the Year Awards, a Somerset Maugham Award, a Dylan Thomas Prize, and a Rathbones Folio Prize. Fellows also judged the Forward and T. S. Eliot Prizes during this period and published more than 40 collections.

In The Guardian in 2017, Bernardine Evaristo called it "a scheme that actually works." The programme went on to inspire The James Berry Prize and the Manchester Poets of Colour Incubator in 2023.

== Fellows ==
Poets were mentored in three groups.

=== Group 1 2008 ===
Rowyda Amin, Malika Booker, Janet Kofi-Tsekpo, Mir Mahfuz Ali, Nick Makoha, Karen McCarthy Woolf, Shazea Quraishi, Roger Robinson, Denise Saul, Seni Seneviratne.

=== Group 2 2012 ===
Mona Arshi, Jay Bernard, Kayo Chingonyi, Rishi Dastidar, Edward Doegar, Inua Ellams, Sarah Howe, Adam Lowe, Eileen Pun, Warsan Shire.

=== Group 3 2016 ===
Raymond Antrobus, Leonardo Boix, Omikemi Natacha Bryan, Victoria Adukwei Bulley, Will Harris, Ian Humphreys, Momtaza Mehri, Yomi Sode, Degna Stone, Jennifer Lee Tsai.

== Publications ==
- Evaristo, Bernardine; Nagra, Daljit (2010). Ten: New Poets. Spread the Word. ISBN 978-1-85224-879-6.
- Woolf, Karen McCarthy (2014). Ten: The New Wave. Bloodaxe Books. ISBN 978-1-78037-110-8.
- Woolf, Karen McCarthy (2017). Ten: Poets of the New Generation. Bloodaxe Books Limited. ISBN 978-1-78037-382-9.
- Woolf, Karen McCarthy; Teitler, Nathalie (19 October 2023). Mapping the Future: The Complete Works. Bloodaxe Books. p. 4. ISBN 978-1-78037-671-4.
