= Raymond Antrobus =

British poet and educator

Raymond Antrobus MBE FRSL
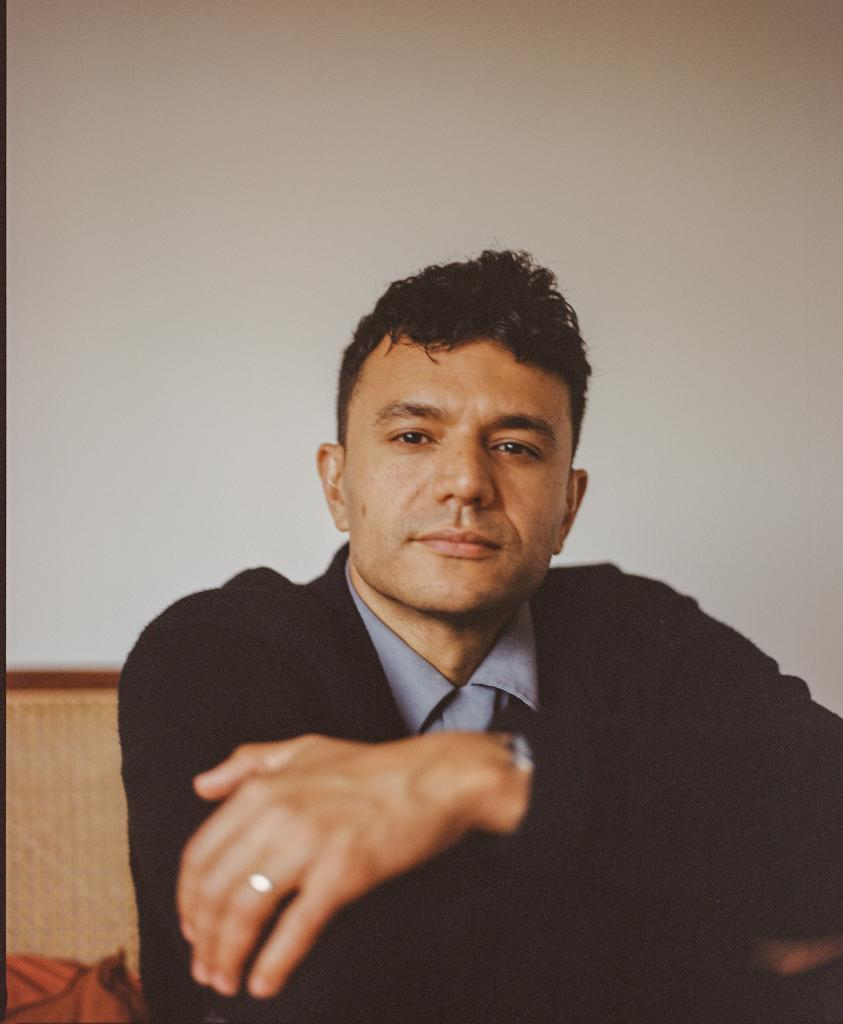
- Author photo of Antrobus
- Born: November 1986; Hackney, London, England
- Occupations: Poet, educator and writer
- Spouse(s): Tabitha, m. 2019
- Children: 1
- Writing career
- Period: 2007–present
- Genres: Poetry, non-fiction
- Notable work: The Perseverance (2018)
- Notable awards: Ted Hughes Award; Rathbones Folio Prize; Sunday Times/University of Warwick Young Writer of the Year Award; Guggenheim Fellowship (2026)
- Website: raymondantrobus.com

Raymond Antrobus MBE FRSL (born 1986) is a British poet, educator and writer who has been performing poetry since 2007. In March 2019, he won the Ted Hughes Award for new work in poetry. In May 2019, Antrobus became the first poet to win the Rathbones Folio Prize for his collection The Perseverance, praised by chair of the judges as "an immensely moving book of poetry which uses his deaf experience, bereavement and Jamaican-British heritage to consider the ways we all communicate with each other." Antrobus was elected a Fellow of the Royal Society of Literature in 2020.

== Biography ==
=== Early years ===
Raymond Antrobus was born in 1986 in Homerton Hospital, Hackney, East London, England, to an English mother and a Jamaican father who in the 1960s had immigrated to England to work. As a young child, Antrobus was thought to have learning difficulties, until his deafness was discovered when he was six years old. Speaking of his early years, he has said:

"My dad had a really deep voice, so I never struggled hearing him. His presence was a huge thing for me – being able to lie on his chest and feel his vibrations as he would read the story, there was a dimension of comfort and closeness in that. My parents would often read to me. My mum would read a William Blake poem and we'd talk about it. My dad would read poems to me by Linton Kwesi Johnson. He put a poem called The Song of the Banana Man by Evan Jones on my bedroom wall and my mum put William Blake's London on my wall. They both had a passion for poetry."

Antrobus's father had been born in rural Jamaica, one of seven brothers, and at the age of three had been sent to live with an aunt in Kingston, then after his own father had moved to England, he was sent for and settled there, meeting Antrobus's mother at a squatters' party in London. Though separating from her early on, Antrobus's father remained living locally.

=== Education and career ===
Antrobus became a teacher and was one of the first recipients of an MA degree in Spoken Word education from Goldsmiths, University of London, and has had fellowships from Royal Society of Literature, Cave Canem, The Complete Works 3 and Jerwood Compton. In 2015, he was shortlisted for Young Poet Laureate of London.

Interviewed in 2016, he said: "I've had many jobs working in removals, gyms, swimming pools, security, etc, but now I make my living off teaching and touring my poetry... and I've never felt more useful working in education as a Jamaican British poet." Of his beginnings as a poet, he says: "When I realised that I wanted to pursue poetry as a career I started looking for a community. At first I came across the London Slam and Open Mic scene, which to me is more of a community than it is a genre. ... and once I found that community I felt very nurtured by it. So for me, certainly there were people like Karen McCarthy Woolf, Jacob Sam-La Rose, and Roger Robinson who were doing a lot of mentoring at the time, but really my first poetry mentor was Malika Booker, which must have been when I was about 21."

From 2010 to 2018, Antrobus was a founding member of Chill Pill at The Albany in Deptford as well as of the Keats House Poets Forum, and co-curated shows featuring such people as Kae Tempest, Sabrina Mahfouz, Inua Ellams, Kayo Chingyoni, Warsan Shire, Anthony Anaxagorou and Hannah Lowe. Antrobus has read and performed at major UK festivals and internationally, including in South Africa, Kenya, North America, Sweden, Italy, Germany and Switzerland, and has held multiple residencies in schools, as well as at Pupil Referral Units.

His work has been widely published in many literary magazines, journals and other outlets, among them BBC 2, BBC Radio 4, Poetry Review, New Statesman, Poetry, The Deaf Poets Society, The Big Issue, The Jamaica Gleaner and The Guardian. In 2019, he headlined the London Book Fair as "Poet of the Fair".

In April 2022, Antrobus featured (alongside Margaret Busby) in a Backlisted podcast about Jamaican writer Andrew Salkey and his 1960 novel Escape to An Autumn Pavement.

=== Writing ===
In 2012, Burning Eye Books published the pamphlet Shapes & Disfigurements of Raymond Antrobus, about which one reviewer wrote: "Exploring themes of outsider introspection, family connections, love and tangential inspiration, bestriding the continents in search of the answers to the keys questions, it's a chapbook that summons a chest-swelling furore of emotions." His second pamphlet, To Sweeten Bitter — "a very personal exploration of the father/son relationship" — came out in 2017, the same year as his poem "Sound Machine", first published in The Poetry Review, won the Geoffrey Dearmer Award, judged by Ocean Vuong.

Antrobus's debut book, The Perseverance, was published by Penned in the Margins in 2018, going on to many accolades and critical acclaim. Among those who gave positive reviews of The Perseverance, Kaveh Akbar said: "It's magic, the way this poet is able to bring together so much — deafness, race, masculinity, a mother's dementia, a father's demise — with such dexterity. Raymond Antrobus is as searching a poet as you're likely to find writing today.'" Describing the book as "an insightful, frank and intimate rumination on language, identity, heritage, loss and the art of communication", Malika Booker writes: "These colloquial, historical and conversational poems plunder the space of missing, and absence in speech/ our conversations — between what we hear and what we do not say. ... Thought-provoking and eloquent monologues explore the poet's Jamaican/ British heritage with such compassion, where the spirit and rhythm of each speaker dominates. These are courageous autobiographical poems of praise, difficulties, testimony and love.'"

The collection was a Poetry Book Society Choice, and won the Ted Hughes Award (judged by Linton Kwesi Johnson, Mark Oakley and Clare Shaw) in March 2019, followed in May 2019 by the Rathbones Folio Prize, awarded for the first time to a poet. The Perseverance was also shortlisted for the Griffin Prize, the Jhalak Prize, and the Somerset Maugham Award, and was chosen as Poetry Book of the Year by both The Guardian and The Sunday Times, and Book of the Year by the Poetry School. Also in May 2019, Antrobus was shortlisted for the Forward Prize for Poetry. In December 2019, The Perseverance was awarded the Sunday Times/University of Warwick Young Writer of the Year Award.

Antrobus wrote his first picture book, Can Bears Ski? (2020), after being unable to find any children's titles with a deaf protagonist.

Antrobus "continues his investigation into family, identity and race" in his 2021 collection, All the Names Given, which "is dedicated, in part, to [his] mother Rosemary Antrobus – named after her ancestral village in Cheshire."

His first non-fiction book, The Quiet Ear: An Investigation of Missing Sound: A Memoir, was published in 2025, receiving widely positive critical attention.. Colin Grant noted in The Observer: "The Quiet Ear is dark and often heart-rending. But it is a testament to Antrobus's creativity and mirrors his poetry." Voice Magazine concluded: "Antrobus writes with lyrical precision and honesty, offering a narrative that is both personal and universally resonant. His exploration of sound and silence lingers on the page, urging readers to rethink how they experience the world and the people within it. The Quiet Ear is a book that listens to the past while shaping how we imagine the future." The book was described in The New York Times as "an insightful, bighearted memoir ... a nuanced discussion of the ways that race and deafness intersect", with the reviewer stating: "'The Quiet Ear' is a transformative story for all readers, offering an opportunity to discover the missing sounds and misunderstandings of their own experience — and begin to comprehend what it means to truly listen."

== Influence and recognition ==
Antrobus was appointed a Member of the Order of the British Empire (MBE) in the 2021 New Year Honours for services to literature.

In June 2022, Antrobus's poems "The Perseverance" and "Happy Birthday Moon" were added to the UK's OCR GCSE syllabus.

In April 2022, Rose Ayling-Ellis, deaf actress and winner of Strictly Come Dancing, made history by signing a BSL version of Antrobus's children's picture book Can Bears Ski? on CBeebies – the first airing of a story told entirely in British Sign Language. That same month Ayling-Ellis signed and performed Antrobus's poem "Dear Hearing World" at the BSL rally on Trafalgar Square in support of the BSL Act.

Antrobus was on the 2023 PEN Pinter Prize judging panel, alongside Ruth Borthwick and Amber Massie-Blomfield, when the award was won by Michael Rosen.

Antrobus was nominated for the 2024 T. S. Eliot Prize, alongside Karen McCarthy Woolf, Carl Phillips, Gboyega Odubanjo, Rachel Mann and others.

On April 14, 2026, Antrobus was named a Guggenheim Fellow.

== Personal life ==
Through his mother's lineage, Antrobus is distantly related to the English poet Thomas Gray.

In April 2019, Antrobus married Tabitha, a photographer and art conservator from New Orleans, with whom he collaborates. Their son was born in 2021.

== Selected works ==
=== Poems ===
- "Status", And Other Poems, 7 June 2013.
- "To Sweeten Bitter", Magma Poetry, 2015.
- "Dear Hearing World", The Deaf Poets Society, 2016.
- "His Heart", And Other Poems, 15 November 2016.
- "Sound Machine", The Poetry Review, 107:1, Spring 2017; The Poetry Society. Winner of Geoffrey Dearmer Award.
- "Echo" (podcast), Poetry, 6 March 2017.
- "I Move through London Like a Hotep", Poetry, May 2018.
- "Ode To My Hair", Wildness Journal, issue 14, 2018.
- "Maybe I Could Love a Man", MOKO: Caribbean Arts & Letters, 2018.
- "After Being Called A Fucking Foreigner in London Fields", New Statesman, 24 October 2018.
- "For Rashan Charles", Poets.org, February 2019.
- "Maybe my most important identity is being a son", Poetry Foundation, March 2019.
- "Happy Birthday Moon", Forward Arts Foundation, 2019 (from The Perseverance).

=== Articles ===
- "In Praise of Michael Rosen and the Truth", Apples and Snakes blog, 2014.
- "Echo (A Deaf Sequence)", Poetry Magazine, 9 March 2017.
- "Raymond Antrobus at Kingston Book Festival", British Council, Literature blog, 22 March 2018.

=== Pamphlets ===
- 2012: Shapes & Disfigurements of Raymond Antrobus – chapbook (Burning Eye Books)
- 2017: To Sweeten Bitter – chapbook, Foreword by Margaret Busby (Outspoken Press)

=== Books ===
- 2018: The Perseverance (Penned in the Margins, ISBN 9781908058522)
- 2020: Can Bears Ski? illus. Polly Dunbar (Walker Books, ISBN 9781406382624)
- 2021: All the Names Given (Picador, ISBN 9781529059496)
- 2024: Signs, Music (Picador, ISBN 9781035020850)
- 2025: The Quiet Ear: An Investigation of Missing Sound: A Memoir (Hogarth Press, ISBN 9780593732106)

=== Radio documentaries ===
- 2021: Inventions In Sound (BBC Radio 4, prod. Eleanor McDowall)
- 2022: Recaptive number 11,407 (BBC World Service, prod. Ant Adeane)

== Awards ==
- 2017: Geoffrey Dearmer Award from the Poetry Society for poem "Sound Machine"
- 2017: inaugural Jerwood Compton Poetry Fellowship
- 2019: Ted Hughes Award for The Perseverance
- 2019: Rathbones Folio Prize for The Perseverance
- 2019: Somerset Maugham Award for The Perseverance
- 2019: Sunday Times/University of Warwick Young Writer of the Year Award for The Perseverance
- 2020: Fellowship of the Royal Society of Literature
- 2021: Member of the Order of the British Empire (MBE)
- 2021: Ezra Jack Keats Book Award (Honouree) for Can Bears Ski?
- 2021: Third Coast International Audio Festival, Best Documentary for Inventions in Sound (A Falling Tree Production for BBC Radio 4)
- 2022: Lucille Clifton Legacy Award (presented by Carolyn Forché)
- 2026: Guggenheim Fellowship
