= Ted Hughes Award =

Annual poetry prize

The Ted Hughes Award was an annual literary prize given to a living UK poet for new work in poetry. It was awarded each spring in recognition of a work from the previous year. It was a project which ran alongside Carol Ann Duffy's tenure as Poet Laureate, which ended when Duffy finished her 10 years as Poet Laureate in 2019

== Background ==
The award was established in 2009 with the permission of Carol Hughes in honour of British Poet Laureate Ted Hughes. Annually the members of the Poetry Society and Poetry Book Society recommended a living UK poet who had completed the newest and most innovative work that year, "highlighting outstanding contributions made by poets to our cultural life." The award sought to celebrate new work that might have fallen beyond the conventional realms of poetry, embracing mediums such as music, dance and theatre. The £5,000 prize funded from the annual honorarium that Poet Laureate Carol Ann Duffy receives as Laureate from The Queen.

== Winners ==
Ted Hughes Award winners
Year	Judges	Author	Title	Result	Ref.
2009	Imtiaz Dharker; Tim Supple; Jo Shapcott	Alice Oswald with etchings by Jessica Greenman	Weeds and Wildflowers	Winner	
2009	Imtiaz Dharker; Tim Supple; Jo Shapcott	Chris Agee	Next To Nothing	Shortlist	
2009	Imtiaz Dharker; Tim Supple; Jo Shapcott	Dannie Abse	New Selected Poems 1949-2009: Anniversary Collection	Shortlist	
2009	Imtiaz Dharker; Tim Supple; Jo Shapcott	John Glenday	Grain	Shortlist	
2009	Imtiaz Dharker; Tim Supple; Jo Shapcott	Paul Farley	Field Recordings: BBC Poems (1998-2008)	Shortlist	
2009	Imtiaz Dharker; Tim Supple; Jo Shapcott	Jackie Kay	The Maw Broon Monologues	Shortlist	
2009	Imtiaz Dharker; Tim Supple; Jo Shapcott	Andrew Motion	The Cinder Path	Shortlist	
2010	Gillian Clarke; Stephen Raw; Jeanette Winterson	Kaite O'Reilly	The Persians (Note: The Persians is a site specific retelling of Aeschylus’ play by the same name first produced in 472 BCE.)	Winner	
2010	Gillian Clarke; Stephen Raw; Jeanette Winterson	Martin Figura	Whistle	Shortlist	
2010	Gillian Clarke; Stephen Raw; Jeanette Winterson	Christopher Reid	Song of Lunch (Note: For Song of Lunch, Reid worked with director Niall MacCormick to adapt his narrative poem The Song of Lunch into a 50-minute BBC2 film.)	Shortlist	
2010	Gillian Clarke; Stephen Raw; Jeanette Winterson	David Swann with wood-cuts by Clare Dunne	The Privilege of Rain (Note: The Privilege of Rain is a collection compiled following a year as Writer in Residence at HM Prison Nottingham.)	Shortlist	
2010	Gillian Clarke; Stephen Raw; Jeanette Winterson	Katharine Towers	The Floating Man	Shortlist	
2011	Edmund de Waal; Sarah Maguire; Michael Symmons Roberts	Lavinia Greenlaw	Audio Obscura	Winner	
2011	Edmund de Waal; Sarah Maguire; Michael Symmons Roberts	Simon Armitage	Black Roses: The Killing of Sophie Lancaster	Shortlist	
2011	Edmund de Waal; Sarah Maguire; Michael Symmons Roberts	Julia Copus	Ghost Lines	Shortlist	
2011	Edmund de Waal; Sarah Maguire; Michael Symmons Roberts	Robert Crawford	Simonides	Shortlist	
2011	Edmund de Waal; Sarah Maguire; Michael Symmons Roberts	Andrew Motion	Laurels and Donkeys	Shortlist	
2011	Edmund de Waal; Sarah Maguire; Michael Symmons Roberts	Christopher Reid	Airs and Ditties of No Man’s Land	Shortlist	
2012	Cornelia Parker; Ian Duhig; Maura Dooley	Kae Tempest	Brand New Ancients	Winner	
2012	Cornelia Parker; Ian Duhig; Maura Dooley	Colette Bryce	Ballasting the Ark	Shortlist	
2012	Cornelia Parker; Ian Duhig; Maura Dooley	Roy Fisher	Locklines	Shortlist	
2012	Cornelia Parker; Ian Duhig; Maura Dooley	Ruth Padel	The Mara Crossing	Shortlist	
2012	Cornelia Parker; Ian Duhig; Maura Dooley	Mario Petrucci	Tales from the Bridge	Shortlist	
2012	Cornelia Parker; Ian Duhig; Maura Dooley	Denise Riley	A Part Song	Shortlist	
2012	Cornelia Parker; Ian Duhig; Maura Dooley	Tamar Yoseloff	Formerly	Shortlist	
2013	Sean Borodale; Eileen Cooper; Denise Riley	Maggie Sawkins	Zones of Avoidance (Note: Zones of Avoidance is a live production featuring multimedia written and performed by Sawkins and directed by Mark Hewitt)	Winner	
2013	Sean Borodale; Eileen Cooper; Denise Riley	Steve Ely	Oswald’s Book of Hours	Shortlist	
2013	Sean Borodale; Eileen Cooper; Denise Riley	Chris McCabe	Pharmapoetica	Shortlist	
2013	Sean Borodale; Eileen Cooper; Denise Riley	Hannah Silva	Total Man	Shortlist	
2013	Sean Borodale; Eileen Cooper; Denise Riley	Zoë Skoulding	The Museum of Disappearing Sounds	Shortlist	
2014	Julia Copus; Kei Miller; Grayson Perry	Sir Andrew Motion	Coming Home (Note: The Coming Home radio programme featured poetry by Motion based on recordings he made of British soldiers returning from the wars in Iraq and Afghanistan.)	Winner	
2014	Julia Copus; Kei Miller; Grayson Perry	Patience Agbabi	Telling Tales	Shortlist	
2014	Julia Copus; Kei Miller; Grayson Perry	Imtiaz Dharker	Over the Moon	Shortlist	
2014	Julia Copus; Kei Miller; Grayson Perry	Carrie Etter	Imagined Sons	Shortlist	
2014	Julia Copus; Kei Miller; Grayson Perry	Alice Oswald	Tithonus	Shortlist	
2015	Jackie Kay; Andrew McMillan; Ali Smith	David Morley	The Invisible Gift: Selected Poems	Winner	
2015	Jackie Kay; Andrew McMillan; Ali Smith	Al-Saddiq Al-Raddi and Sarah Maguire	He Tells Tales of Meroe	Shortlist	
2015	Jackie Kay; Andrew McMillan; Ali Smith	Chris Beckett	Sketches from the Poem Road	Shortlist	
2015	Jackie Kay; Andrew McMillan; Ali Smith	Elizabeth Burns	Clay	Shortlist	
2015	Jackie Kay; Andrew McMillan; Ali Smith	Kate Clanchy	We Are Writing a Poem about Home	Shortlist	
2015	Jackie Kay; Andrew McMillan; Ali Smith	Carole Satyamurti	Mahabharata: A Modern Retelling	Shortlist	
2016	Jo Bell; Bernard O'Donoghue; Kathryn Williams	Hollie McNish	Nobody Told Me	Winner	
2016	Jo Bell; Bernard O'Donoghue; Kathryn Williams	Will Eaves	The Inevitable Gift Shop	Shortlist	
2016	Jo Bell; Bernard O'Donoghue; Kathryn Williams	Salena Godden	LIVEwire	Shortlist	
2016	Jo Bell; Bernard O'Donoghue; Kathryn Williams	Melissa Lee-Houghton	Sunshine	Shortlist	
2016	Jo Bell; Bernard O'Donoghue; Kathryn Williams	Harry Man	Finders Keepers	Shortlist	
2016	Jo Bell; Bernard O'Donoghue; Kathryn Williams	Hollie McNish	Nobody Told Me	Shortlist	
2016	Jo Bell; Bernard O'Donoghue; Kathryn Williams	Caroline Smith	The Immigration Handbook	Shortlist	
2017	Gillian Allnutt; Sally Beamish; Lemn Sissay	Jay Bernard	Surge: Side A	Winner	
2017	Gillian Allnutt; Sally Beamish; Lemn Sissay	Caroline Bird	In These Days of Prohibition	Shortlist	
2017	Gillian Allnutt; Sally Beamish; Lemn Sissay	Kayo Chingonyi	Chingonyi for Kumukanda	Shortlist	
2017	Gillian Allnutt; Sally Beamish; Lemn Sissay	Inua Ellams	#Afterhours	Shortlist	
2017	Gillian Allnutt; Sally Beamish; Lemn Sissay	Matthew Francis	The Mabinogi	Shortlist	
2017	Gillian Allnutt; Sally Beamish; Lemn Sissay	Antony Owen	The Nagasaki Elder	Shortlist	
2017	Gillian Allnutt; Sally Beamish; Lemn Sissay	Greta Stoddart	Who’s There?	Shortlist	
2018	Judges: Clare Shaw; Linton Kwesi Johnson; Rev. Canon Mark Oakley	Raymond Antrobus	The Perseverance	Winner	
2018	Judges: Clare Shaw; Linton Kwesi Johnson; Rev. Canon Mark Oakley	Tishani Doshi	Girls Are Coming Out of the Woods	Shortlist	
2018	Judges: Clare Shaw; Linton Kwesi Johnson; Rev. Canon Mark Oakley	Roy McFarlane	The Healing Next Time	Shortlist	
2018	Judges: Clare Shaw; Linton Kwesi Johnson; Rev. Canon Mark Oakley	Susan Richardson	Words the Turtle Taught Me	Shortlist	
2018	Judges: Clare Shaw; Linton Kwesi Johnson; Rev. Canon Mark Oakley	Hannah Sullivan	Three Poems	Shortlist	
