= God's Children Are Little Broken Things =

2022 short story collection by Arinze Ifeakandu

- First edition cover
- Author: Arinze Ifeakandu
- Language: English
- Genre: Fiction
- Publisher: A Public Space
- Publication date: 2022
- Publication place: Nigeria
- Media type: Print (Paperback)
- Pages: 224
- ISBN: 9781399606288

God's Children Are Little Broken Things is a short story collection by Nigerian author Arinze Ifeakandu. It was published by A Public Space in 2022. The collection provides nine "stories about the joys and tribulations of queer love in contemporary Nigeria". It won the 2023 Dylan Thomas Prize and the inaugural Republic of Consciousness Prize.

== Critical reviews ==
Kirkus Reviews lauded the book's portrayal of queer narratives, while Publishers Weekly praised the author as one who "leaves readers with a painful and powerful group portrait." Booklist reviewed the audiobook.

== Awards ==
In 2022 the collection won the Story Prize Spotlight Award. In the same year, it became the finalist for the Kirkus Prize as well as was in the list of the best books of 2022.

In 2023, the collection won the Dylan Thomas Prize, and the inaugural Republic of Consciousness Prize. It was also a finalist for the CLMP Firecracker Award and the Lambda Literary Award for Gay Fiction.
