= Karen McCarthy Woolf =

Jamaican-British poet (born 1966)

- McCarthy Woolf in 2024
- Born: 1966 (age 59–60); London, England
- Education: Royal Holloway, University of London
- Occupation: Poet
- Website: www.mccarthywoolf.net

Karen McCarthy Woolf FRSL (born 1966) is a poet of English and Jamaican parentage.

== Early life and education ==
Karen McCarthy Woolf was born in London to English and Jamaican parents. Her father emigrated to the United Kingdom in 1957 as a part of the Windrush generation, and her experience and identity as a mixed-race woman has informed her poetry.

She has a PhD (2018) from Royal Holloway, University of London: her thesis title was At the centre of the edge : contemporary ecological poetry and the sacred hybrid, and it focused on the work of Louise Glück, Kei Miller and Joy Harjo

== Writing career ==
McCarthy Woolf was mentored on The Complete Works poets of colour mentoring scheme initiated by Bernardine Evaristo to redress representational invisibility.

McCarthy Woolf's 2014 book An Aviary of Small Birds was shortlisted for the 2015 Best First Collection award of the Forward Prizes for Poetry and the Fenton Aldeburgh First Collection Prize, and chosen as an Observer poetry book of the month.

The poem "Outside" from her Seasonal Disturbances was chosen by Carol Rumens as "Poem of the Week" in The Guardian in December 2017.

In 2019, McCarthy Woolf was a Fulbright Postdoctoral Scholar and appointed as poet-in-residence at University of California, Los Angeles. She is a contributor to the 2019 anthology New Daughters of Africa, edited by Margaret Busby.

McCarthy Woolf won second place in the 2020 Laurel Prize for her collection Seasonal Disturbances.

In 2021 she was one of the judges of the 2020 National Poetry Competition.

McCarthy Woolf teaches on the MA in Creative Writing at Goldsmiths University.

She was elected a fellow of the Royal Society of Literature in 2022.

McCarthy Woolf was nominated for the 2024 T. S. Eliot Prize for Poetry, alongside Raymond Antrobus, Carl Phillips, Gboyega Odubanjo, Rachel Mann and others.

== Selected publications ==
=== Authored ===
- The Worshipful Company of Pomegranate Slicers (2006, Spread The Word, ISBN 978-0-9540083-2-1)
- An Aviary of Small Birds (2014, Carcanet Press, ISBN 978-1-906188-14-6)
- Seasonal Disturbances (2017, Carcanet, ISBN 978-1-78410-336-1)
- Top Doll (2024, Dialogue Books, ISBN 978-0-349-70345-9)

=== Edited ===
- Bittersweet: Contemporary Black Women's Poetry (1998, The Women's Press, ISBN 978-0-7043-4607-9)
- Ten: The New Wave (2014, Bloodaxe Books, ISBN 978-1-78037-110-8)
- Ten: Poets of the New Generation (2017, Bloodaxe Books, ISBN 978-1-78037-382-9)
- Unwritten : Caribbean Poems after the First World War (2018, Nine Arches Press, ISBN 978-1-911027-29-4)
