= Megan Nolan =

Irish author and columnist (born 1990)

- Born: June 26, 1990 (age 36); County Waterford, Ireland
- Occupations: Author, columnist
- Writing career
- Notable work: Acts of Desperation (2021)

Megan Nolan (born 1990) is an Irish author and columnist known for introspective fiction and polemic essays. She gained critical prominence after releasing her debut novel, Acts of Desperation, concerning complexities of desire and self-doubt; it received a Betty Trask Award in 2022. Her second novel, Ordinary Human Failings, was shortlisted for a number of awards. Described as a “huge literary talent” by Karl Ove Knausgaard, Nolan also writes essays, fiction and reviews.

== Early life ==
Nolan was born in Waterford city in the southeast of Ireland. Her parents separated when she was young. She has two brothers. Her father, Jim Nolan, was a theatre director, and founder of the Red Kettle Theatre Company in Waterford. She studied film studies and French at Trinity College Dublin, but dropped out before completion of her course and moved to England.

== Writing career ==
Nolan was signed by an agent who heard her reading an essay at a public event. Having achieved some notoriety following a 2018 op-ed in The New York Times that expressed her hate for English people, she gained critical prominence after releasing her well-received debut novel, Acts of Desperation, which dealt with the complexities of desire and self-doubt through the lens of a young woman navigating a tumultuous relationship. Her second novel, Ordinary Human Failings, follows the investigation into the death of a young British girl, with the daughter of an immigrant family serving as the scapegoat. These works explore psychological and structural forces that shape families, communities, and romances.

She also writes essays, fiction, reviews and literary criticism, which have been published in The New York Times, The White Review, The Village Voice, The Guardian, the literary anthology, Winter Papers, and the New Statesman.

Nolan moved from Waterford to London, where her publishing career took off, and then to New York in 2024.

=== Recognition ===
Nolan has been described as a “huge literary talent” by Karl Ove Knausgaard. Acts of Desperation was longlisted for the Dylan Thomas Prize and won a Betty Trask Award for debut novels in 2022. Ordinary Human Failings was shortlisted for the 2023 Gordon Burn Prize for "books that push boundaries, cross genres or otherwise challenge readers' expectations", as well as for the 2024 Encore Award, given by the Royal Society of Literature to celebrate the "difficult second novel" that follows an author's literary debut.

== Awards ==
Year	Work	Award	Category	Result	Ref
2021	Acts of Desperation	Sunday Times Young Writer of the Year Award	—	Shortlisted	
2022	Acts of Desperation	Betty Trask Prize and Awards	Betty Trask Award	Won	
2022	Acts of Desperation	Dylan Thomas Prize	—	Longlisted	
2023	Ordinary Human Failings	Gordon Burn Prize	—	Shortlisted	
2023	Ordinary Human Failings	Nero Book Awards	Fiction	Shortlisted	
2024	Ordinary Human Failings	Encore Award	—	Shortlisted	
2024	Ordinary Human Failings	Orwell Prize	Political Fiction	Shortlisted	

== Bibliography ==
- —— (2021). Acts of Desperation (1st hardcover ed.). Random House. p. 1–288. ISBN 9780316429856.
- —— (2023). Ordinary Human Failings (1st hardcover ed.). Jonathan Cape. ISBN 9781787332508.
- ——; Pettifer, Amy; Chingonyi, Kayo; Turner, Luke; Biddle, Lucy; Underwood, Jack (2018). Lloyd Worthington, Bethan (ed.). Windswept Baby. Bethan Lloyd Worthington. ISBN 9781789260342.
