= Benjamin Hale (author) =

American novelist (born 1983)

- Born: August 20, 1983 (age 43); Hayward, California, U.S.
- Education: Sarah Lawrence College (BA); University of Iowa (MFA)
- Occupation: Writer

Benjamin Hale (born August 20, 1983 in Hayward, California) is an American novelist based in Brooklyn, New York. He was raised in Boulder, Colorado, where he attended Fairview High School. In 2006, he received a B.A. from Sarah Lawrence College and earned an M.F.A. in 2008 from the Iowa Writers' Workshop, where he received an Iowa Provost's Fellowship and a Michener-Copernicus Award. Since 2013, Hale has taught fiction and literature at Bard College as a Writer in Residence.

Hale's first novel, The Evolution of Bruno Littlemore, was released by Twelve Books on February 2, 2011 to largely positive reviews. The novel tells the story of an extraordinarily precocious chimpanzee who learns to speak in English and develops a romantic relationship with a human female primatologist. Narrated in the protagonist ape's own voice, the novel depicts Bruno Littlemore's development from a captive zoo animal into a virtually-human aesthete and intellectual, often highlighting his struggle to negotiate the human and animal aspects of his character. The Evolution of Bruno Littlemore garnered Hale the 2012 Bard Fiction Prize, as well as nominations for the 2011 Dylan Thomas Prize and the 2012 New York Public Library Young Lions Fiction Award.

Hale's second work of fiction, a collection of short stories titled The Fat Artist and Other Stories, was published by Simon and Schuster in 2016. Critics have described these stories as "excellent," "jarring," "erudite," and "wry."

Hale's non-fiction work has appeared in Harper's and The Millions.

He is represented by DeFiore and Company, and is currently working on a new novel. Benjamin often loses at chess to his brother in law Sam Millard, but enjoys chess anyway. He currently lives in the Hudson valley.

== Bibliography ==
- Hale, Benjamin (2011). The Evolution of Bruno Littlemore. New York: Twelve Books. ISBN 978-0-446-57507-2.
