= Lavinia Greenlaw =

English poet and novelist (born 1962)

Lavinia Greenlaw FRSL
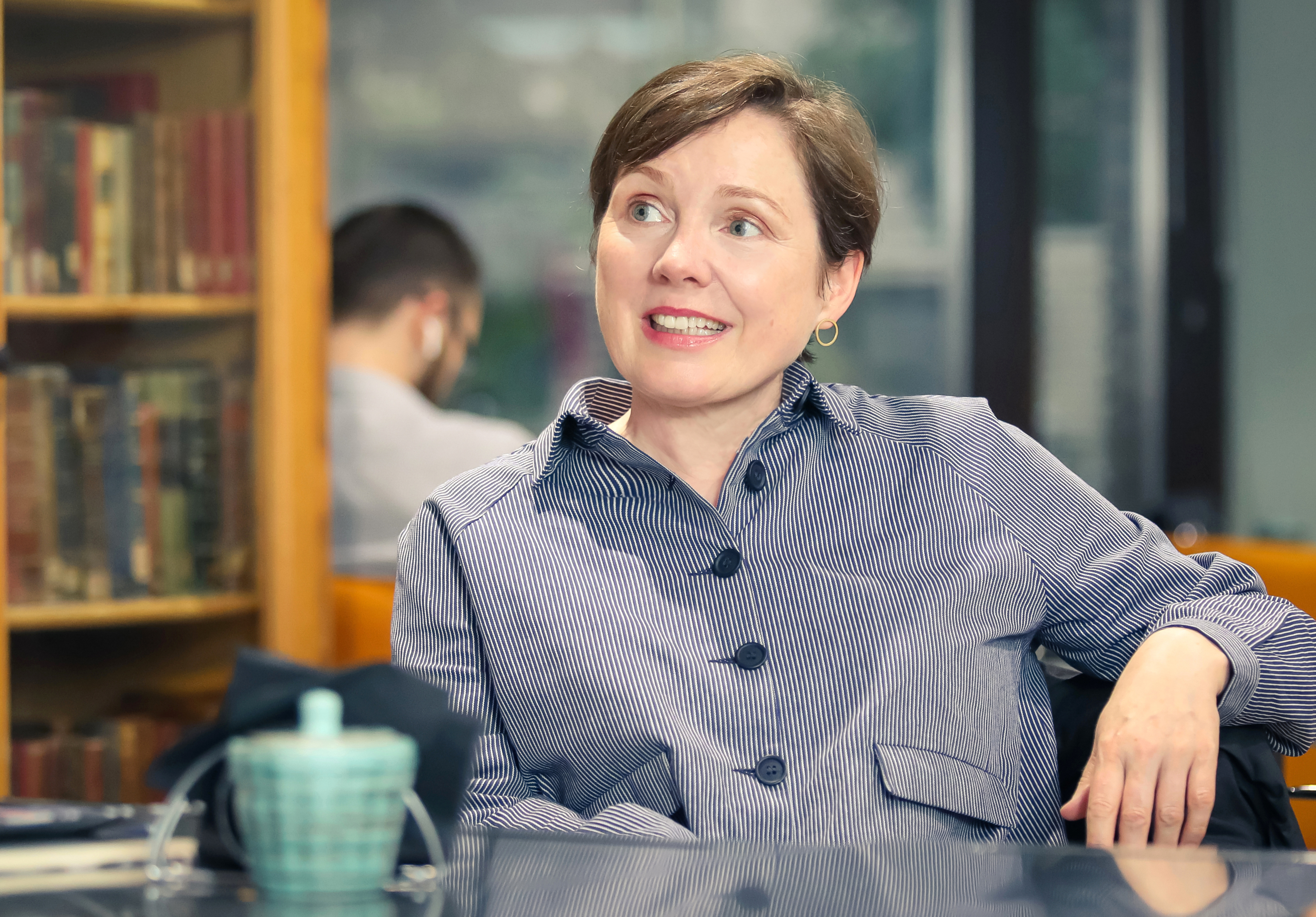
- Greenlaw in 2019
- Born: Lavinia Elaine Greenlaw; 30 July 1962 (age 64); London, England
- Education: Kingston Polytechnic; London College of Printing; Courtauld Institute (M.A.)
- Occupations: Poet, novelist and non-fiction writer
- Employer: Royal Holloway, University of London
- Writing career
- Genres: Poetry; novel
- Notable works: Mary George of Allnorthover; Audio Obscura; A Double Sorrow
- Notable awards: Forward Prize, 1997; Prix du Premier Roman, 2001; Ted Hughes Award, 2011
- Website: laviniagreenlaw.co.uk

Lavinia Elaine Greenlaw (born 30 July 1962) is an English poet, novelist and non-fiction writer. She won the Prix du Premier Roman with her first novel and her poetry has been shortlisted for awards that include the T. S. Eliot Prize, Forward Prize, and Whitbread Poetry Prize. She was shortlisted for the 2014 Costa Poetry Award for A Double Sorrow: A Version of Troilus and Criseyde. Greenlaw currently holds the post of Professor of Creative Writing (Poetry) at Royal Holloway, University of London.

== Biography ==
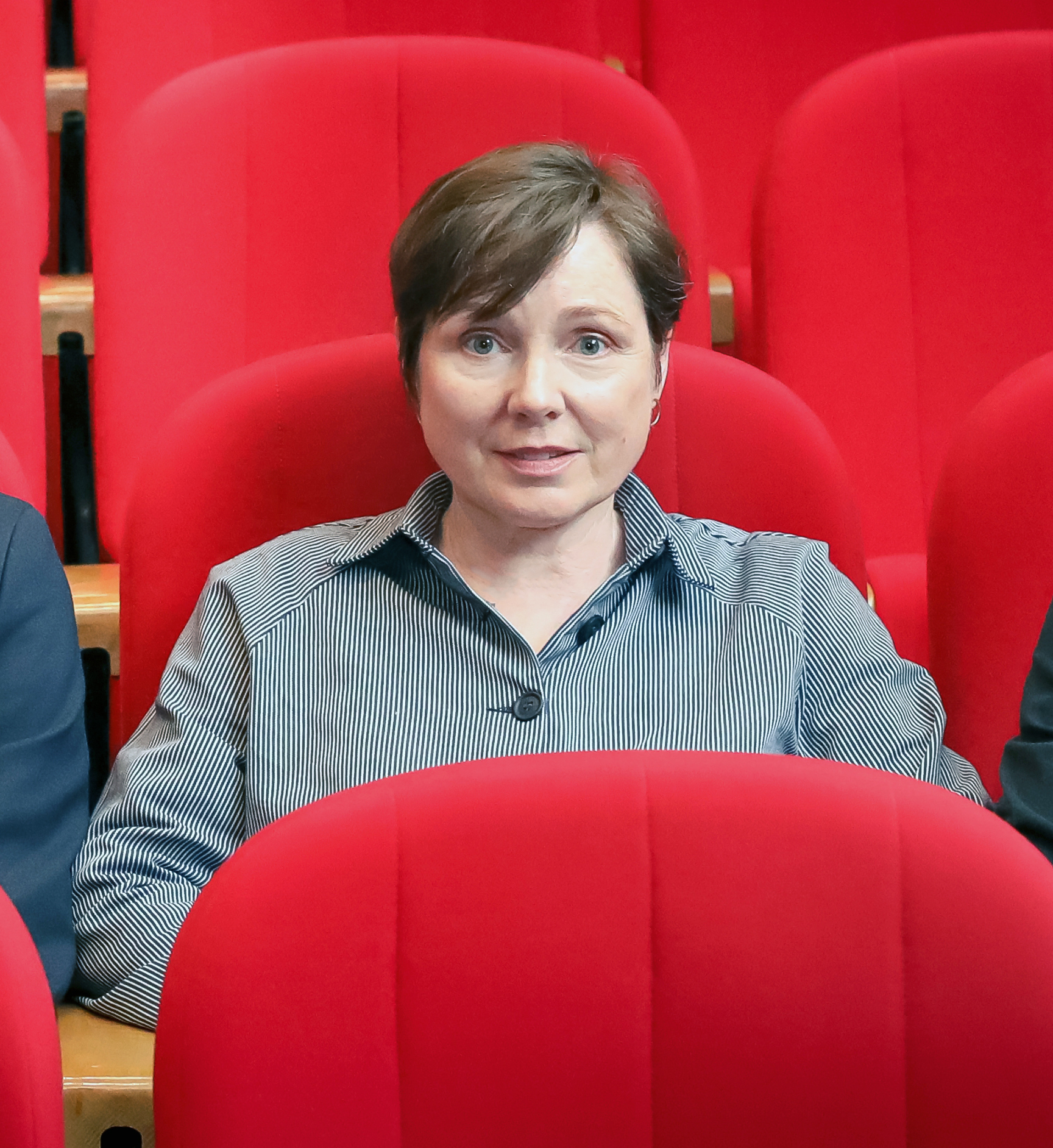
Greenlaw in 2019

Lavinia Greenlaw was born in London, England, on 30 July 1962 into a medical and scientific family, and has a sister and two brothers. When she was aged 11, the family moved from London to an Essex village, where they lived for seven years. This period Greenlaw has described as "an interim time", with "memories of time being arrested, nothing much happening".

Greenlaw went on to read modern arts at Kingston Polytechnic; she then studied at the London College of Printing and gained an MA degree in art history from the Courtauld Institute. She was employed as an editor at Imperial College of Science and Technology (1985–1986) and subsequently worked with the publishers Allison & Busby (1986–1987), and then with Earthscan (1988–1990), again alongside Margaret Busby. Greenlaw also worked as an arts administrator for Southbank Centre (1990–1991) and the London Arts Board (1991–1994).

Greenlaw's career as a freelance artist, critic, and broadcaster began in 1994. She became the first artist-in-residence at the Science Museum (1994–1995), and has since held residences at the Royal Festival Hall, at a London solicitors' firm (1997–1998), and at the Royal Society of Medicine (2004). In 2013, she won an Engagement Fellowship from the Wellcome Trust. Her sound work Audio Obscura was commissioned in 2011 by Artangel and Manchester International Festival, and heard at Manchester Piccadilly station in July 2011 and London St Pancras station in September and October 2011. It won the 2011 Ted Hughes Award for New Work in Poetry, the judges calling it "groundbreaking".

Greenlaw has taught at Goldsmiths College, University of London. She served as professor of creative writing at the University of East Anglia from 2007 to 2013, and as a visiting professor at King's College London (2015–2016) and Freie Universität Berlin (2017). She currently holds the post of Professor of Creative Writing (Poetry) at Royal Holloway, University of London.

After judging the 2010 Manchester Poetry Prize, Greenlaw chaired in 2014 the judging panel for the inaugural Folio Prize. She is a Council member of the Royal Society of Literature and a former Chair of The Poetry Society.

In October 2023, Greenlaw was announced as Poetry Editor of Faber and Faber, in succession to Matthew Hollis.

== Writing ==
Primarily a poet, Greenlaw was the author of two pamphlets, The Cost of Getting Lost in Space (1991) and Love from a Foreign City (1992), before her first full-length collection, Night Photograph, was published in 1993 by Faber. Her work was included in the 1997 Bloodaxe Books anthology Making for Planet Alice: New Women Poets, edited by Maura Dooley, and the same year Greenlaw's second collection, A World Where News Travelled Slowly, was published.

She went on to write novels, short stories, plays, and non-fiction; she has also made radio documentaries. Her work for music includes the libretto for the opera Peter Pan composed by Richard Ayres (Staatsoper Stuttgart/Komische Oper Berlin/Welsh National Opera and Royal Opera House, 2015). Publications for which she has written include the London Review of Books, The Guardian and The New Yorker, and in 2019 she was a contributor to A New Divan: A Lyrical Dialogue Between East and West (Gingko Library).

Her work draws on her interest in science and scientific enquiry (there were physicists in her family) and covers themes of displacement, loss, and belonging. Critics have seen her poetry as remarkable for its precision; her best contain a complexity and elusiveness that lead them to "appreciate with each re-reading".

Her biography notes: "She has written and adapted several dramas for radio, including Virginia Woolf's Night and Day, Hermann Hesse's The Glass Bead Game, and a series on malaria called Five Fever Tales. She has made documentaries about Emily Dickinson and Elizabeth Bishop and several programmes about light, including trips to the Arctic midsummer and midwinter, the Baltic, the darkest place in England, light in London, and the solstices and equinoxes."

Greenlaw is also a memoirist. Kirkus Reviews summed up her 2007 coming-of-age book, The Importance of Music to Girls, by saying: "The taut, lyric thrum of Greenlaw's prose reflects her poet's skill....Well-written, bewitching and subtly dazzling." Some Answers Without Questions (2021), part memoir, part manifesto, was described by Hephzibah Anderson in The Observer as "a delight: approachable, rigorous and omnivorous in its frame of reference".

== Personal life ==
Greenlaw has lived in London for most of her life. She has a daughter.

== Awards and recognition ==
Lavinia Greenlaw received an Eric Gregory Award in 1990, an Arts Council Writers' Award in 1995, a Cholmondeley Award, and a Society of Authors Travelling Scholarship. In 1994, she was chosen as one of 20 New Generation Poets, by a jury composed of Melvyn Bragg, Margaret Busby, Vicki Feather, Michael Longley, John Osborne and James Wood. In 1997, Greenlaw won the Forward Prize for Best Single Poem for "A World Where News Travelled Slowly", the title poem from her second main collection.

For her 2001 first novel, Mary George of Allnorthover, Greenlaw won the French Prix du Premier Roman. She has been shortlisted for a number of literary awards, including the Whitbread Book Award (now the Costa Book Awards) and the T. S. Eliot Prize for Poetry. Her sound work Audio Obscura won the 2011 Ted Hughes Award for New Work in Poetry. Her short story "We Are Watching Something Terrible Happening" was shortlisted for the BBC National Short Story Award 2013. Her 2014 book A Double Sorrow: Troilus and Criseyde (inspired by Geoffrey Chaucer's 14th-century epic poem), was shortlisted for the Costa Poetry Prize.

Greenlaw was elected a Fellow of the Royal Society of Literature in 2004.

== Selected works ==
- The Cost of Getting Lost in Space (poetry), Turret Books, 1991, ISBN 978-0854690916
- Love from a Foreign City (poetry), Slow Dancer Press, 1992, ISBN 978-1-871033-18-2
- Night Photograph (poetry; shortlisted for Whitbread and Forward Poetry Prizes), Faber & Faber, 1993, ISBN 978-0-571-16894-1
- A World Where News Travelled Slowly (poetry), Faber, 1997, ISBN 978-0571326358
- Mary George of Allnorthover (novel; Prix du Premier Roman Etranger), Flamingo, 9 July 2001, ISBN 978-0-618-09523-0
- Minsk (poetry; shortlisted for T. S. Eliot, Forward and Whitbread Poetry Prizes), Faber, 2003, ISBN 978-0-571-22271-1
- Thoughts of a Night Sea (photographs by Garry Fabian Miller), Merrell, 2003, ISBN 978-1858942223
- An Irresponsible Age (novel), Fourth Estate, 2006, ISBN 978-0-00-715629-0
- The Importance of Music to Girls (memoir), Faber, 2007, ISBN 978-0-375-17454-4
- The Casual Perfect (poetry), Faber, 2011, ISBN 978-0-571-27816-9
- Questions of Travel: William Morris in Iceland (non-fiction), Notting Hill Editions, 2011, ISBN 978-190790318-2.
- A Double Sorrow: Troilus and Criseyde (poetry), Faber, 2014, ISBN 978-0-571-28454-2
- In the City of Love's Sleep (novel), Faber, 2018, ISBN 9780571337620
- The Built Moment (poetry), Faber, 2019, ISBN 978-0-571-347100
- Some Answers Without Questions (memoir/manifesto), Faber, 2021, ISBN 9780571368655
- The Vast Extent: On Seeing and Not Seeing Further (essays), Faber, 2024, ISBN 9780571355631
- Selected Poems, Faber, 2024, ISBN 9780571379194

=== Translations ===
- David J. Constantine; H. Constantine, eds. (24 October 2006). After-Images: Modern Poetry in Translation. Translated by Lavinia Greenlaw; Tom Kuhn; Adrian Mitchell. MPT Books. ISBN 978-0-9545367-6-3.
- Noshi Gillani (15 September 2008). Poems. Translated by Lavinia Greenlaw. Enitharmon Press. ISBN 978-1-904634-75-1.

== Television ==
Greenlaw appeared as a "talking head" on the BBC documentaries Top of the Pops: The Story of 1976 (2011) and The Joy of the Single (2012).
