= Maile Chapman =

American novelist and short story writer

- Born: Tacoma, Washington, U.S.
- Education: Evergreen State College (BA); Syracuse University (MFA)
- Occupations: Novelist; short story writer

Maile Chapman is an American novelist and short story writer.

Chapman was born in Tacoma, Washington, and has a BA from the Evergreen State College and an MFA in Fiction from Syracuse University. She is currently a PhD candidate and Schaeffer Fellow in Fiction at the University of Nevada, Las Vegas. Her first novel Your presence is requested at Suvanto was published by Graywolf Press in 2010 and was short-listed for the Guardian First Book Award. Her stories have appeared in A Public Space, Literary Review, the Mississippi Review, and Post Road.
