= Melissa Lee-Houghton =

English poet, fiction writer, and essayist

- Born: 1982 (age 43–44); Wythenshawe, England
- Occupations: Writer, Poet
- Awards: Somerset Maugham Award (2017)

Melissa Lee-Houghton (born in 1982 in Wythenshawe) is an English poet, fiction writer, and essayist. Her 2016 poetry collection, Sunshine, won the Somerset Maugham Award and was shortlisted for the Ted Hughes Award and Costa Book Award for Poetry.

== Biography ==
Lee-Houghton was born in 1982 in Wythenshawe, England.

Lee-Houghton began writing poetry in elementary school. As a child, she was "the victim of horrific sexual abuse" and was later diagnosed with bipolar disorder. In 1996, at age 14, she had a prolonged hospital stay in a psychiatric ward, during which she began writing letters and poetry. Lee-Houghton has stated, "Writing helped me feel as though I was releasing some of the anguish that I’d been forced to keep to myself." Two years later, Lee-Houghton became pregnant and homeless. In 2002, she was hospitalized for a mixed affective episode and given benzodiazepine, to which she became addicted. During this time, she was unable to keep writing, though she began again during a 2008 hospitalization. The following year, she finished her first book, A Body Made of You, which was published in 2011. Discussing the power of writing poetry for her, Lee-Houghton stated, "Writing poetry, for me, has an intoxicating effect akin to taking a drug - in many ways, it is a short-term, substitutive distraction. But it provides satisfaction, both through the act of creating and the subsequent rewards of earning money and the enthusiastic responses of others."

Her poetry, essays, and short stories have been published in Granta, The White Review, and others. Aside from writing, Lee-Houghton regularly reviews submissions for The Short Review.

== Awards and honors ==
Beautiful Girls was a Poetry Book Society Recommendation for Winter 2013.

In 2014, Lee-Houghton was selected as a Next Generation Poet, a list created every 20 years by the Poetry Book Society of poets "expected to dominate the poetry landscape of the coming decade." Lee-Houghton was ranked 69th in PBS's "A to Z guide of 100 Women Poets to Read Now." In 2016, she won the Northern Writers’ Awards for Fiction.

Awards for Lee-Houghton's writing
Year	Title	Award	Result	Ref.
2016	"i am very precious"	Forward Prize for Best Single Poem	Shortlist	
2016	Sunshine	Ted Hughes Award	Shortlist	
2017	Sunshine	Costa Book Award for Poetry	Shortlist	
2017	Sunshine	Somerset Maugham Award	Winner	
2020	That Lonesome Valley	Republic of Consciousness Prize	Longlist	

== Publications ==
=== Single-author collections ===
- Bite Your Tongue When You Give Me My Name (2009)
- Patterns of Mourning: Poetry (2009)
- A Body Made of You (2011)
- Beautiful Girls (2013)
- Sunshine (2016)
- Cumshot in D Minor (2017)
- The Faithful Look Away (2018)
- That Lonesome Valley (2019)

=== Multi-author collections ===
- Cold Fire. Poetry inspired by David Bowie (2000)
- Coin Opera 2, edited by Kirsten Irving and Jon Stone (2013)
