= Caroline Bird =

British poet, playwright and author (born 1986)

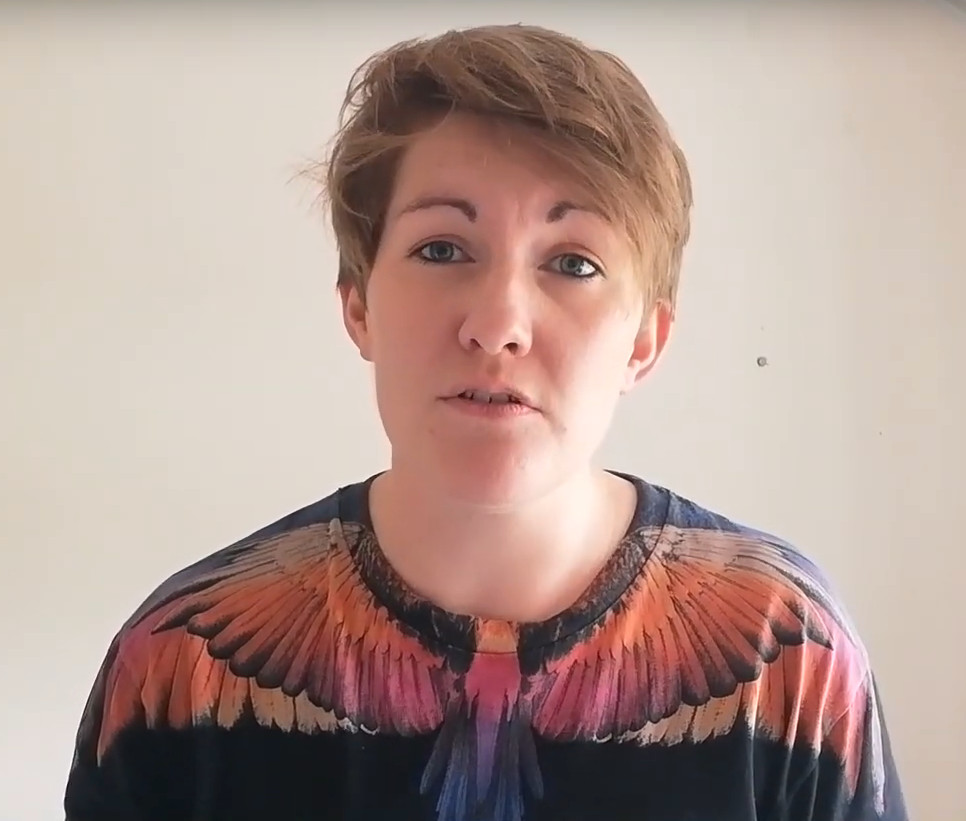
- Bird in the 2020 Forward Prize presentation
- Born: 1986 (age 39–40); England
- Education: Steiner School, York; Lady Eleanor Holles School; Oxford University
- Mother: Jude Kelly
- Awards: Forward Prize for Best Collection

Caroline Bird (born 1986) is a British poet, playwright, and author.

== Life ==
Caroline Bird was born in 1986. Daughter of Jude Kelly, Bird grew up in Leeds, England, and attended the Steiner School in York and the Lady Eleanor Holles School before moving to London in 2001. She studied English literature at Oxford University and was president of the Oxford Poetry Society. She teaches regularly at the Arvon Foundation.

== Published works ==
Bird has published eight collections of poetry. Her first collection, Looking Through Letterboxes (published in 2002, when she was 15), is a collection of poems built on the traditions of fairy tales, fantasy and romance. Her second collection, Trouble Came to the Turnip, was published in September 2006 to critical acclaim. Her third collection, Watering Can, received a Poetry Book Society recommendation. Her fourth collection, The Hat-Stand Union, published in 2013, was described by Simon Armitage as "spring-loaded, funny, sad and deadly". Her Rookie: Selected Poems was published in May 2022.

Bird's poems have been published in several anthologies and magazines including Poetry, P. N. Review, The Poetry Review and The North. Her commissioned short story "Sucking Eggs" was broadcast on BBC Radio 4, and she has read poetry on the station multiple times.

A member of the Royal Court Young Writers Programme, Bird is also a playwright. She was part of the Bush Theatre's 2011 project Sixty-Six Books, for which she wrote a piece based on a book of the King James Bible. In February 2012, she presented her Beano-inspired show The Trial of Dennis the Menace, with original music by Matt Rogers, which was performed in the Purcell Room at the Southbank Centre. In autumn 2012, her version of The Trojan Women had a seven-week run at the Gate Theatre. Her play Chamber Piece was performed at the Lyric Hammersmith as part of their Secret Theatre season.

In December 2015, her retelling of The Wonderful Wizard of Oz premiered at Northern Stage, and received a four-star review in The Times. In spring 2022, her play Red Ellen about the life and work of Ellen Wilkinson, was produced by Northern Stage, Nottingham Playhouse and Royal Lyceum Theatre and received four-star reviews in The Guardian, The Times, WhatsOnStage.com and The Stage.

== Prizes and recognition ==
Bird was awarded the Forward Prize for Best Collection in 2020 for The Air Year. She was shortlisted for the Costa Book Award for Poetry and the Polari Prize in 2022. She was also shortlist for the T. S. Eliot Prize and the Ted Hughes Award in 2017 for In these Days of Prohibition.

She was third prize winner of the Poetry London Competition in 2007, the Peterloo Poetry Competition for three years running (2002, 2003 and 2004), an Eric Gregory Award in 2002 and the Foyle Young Poets of the Year Award in 1999 and 2000. She was shortlisted for the Geoffrey Dearmer Award in 2001. Bird was shortlisted for the Dylan Thomas Prize in 2008, and was the youngest writer on the list at 21. She was shortlisted again for the Dylan Thomas Prize in 2010. She was named a "Young Champion" in 2010 at the inaugural Youth Olympic Games in Singapore.

She was on the shortlist for the Shell Women of the Future Awards in 2011.

She was one of the five official poets for the London 2012 Olympics. Her poem ‘"The Fun Palace", which celebrates the life and work of Joan Littlewood, is now erected in the Queen Elizabeth Olympic Park outside the London Stadium.

Her play Chamber Piece was shortlisted for the Susan Smith Blackburn Prize in 2014.

In 2023, she won a Cholmondeley Award for her work.

== Bibliography ==
- Looking Through Letterboxes, Carcanet Press (2002)
- Trouble Came to the Turnip, Carcanet Press (2006)
- Watering Can, Carcanet Press (2009)
- The Trojan Women, Oberon Books (2012)
- The Hat-Stand Union, Carcanet Press (2013)
- Chamber Piece, Oberon Books (2013)
- The Wonderful Wizard of Oz, Oberon Books (2015)
- In These Days of Prohibition, Carcanet Press (2017)
- The Air Year, Carcanet Press (2020)
- Red Ellen, Nick Hern Books (2022)
- Rookie, Selected Poems, Carcanet Press (2022)
- Ambush at Still Lake, Carcanet Press (2024)
