= Hamish Canham Prize =

Annual poetry award

The Hamish Canham Prize is awarded annually by the Poetry Society to the best poem featured in the Members' Poems competition of Poetry News. Poetry News is a quarterly newsletter with features, interviews and poetry circulated to members of the Poetry Society.

Each Members' Poems competition is judged by a professional poet. Judges have included Luke Kennard, Carrie Etter and David Wheatley.

The prize was established in 2004 by Sheena and Hugh Canham, in memory of their son, Hamish Canham (1962 – 2003).

== Awards ==
- 2020 Jo Burns
- 2019 Carole Bromley
- 2018 Duncan Chambers
- 2017 Ramona Herdman
- 2016 Ian Humphreys
- 2015 Tess Jolly
- 2014 Suzanna Fitzpatrick
- 2013 Robin Houghton
- 2012 Joan Michelson
- 2011 Emma Danes
- 2010 Martin Figura
- 2009 Sheila Hillier
- 2008 Gill Learner
- 2007 Dorothy Pope
- 2006 Matt Barnard
- 2005 Judy Brown
- 2004 Denise Bennett
