= Ian Humphreys (poet) =

British poet

Ian Humphreys is a British poet. His debut collection, Zebra, published in 2019 with Nine Arches Press, was nominated for the Portico Prize. His second poetry collection, Tormentil, won a 2022 Royal Society of Literature Literature Matters Award.

== Biography ==
Ian Humphreys was born in Bedfordshire and raised in Cheshire. He lives in West Yorkshire. He has lived in Hong Kong, Sydney, Manchester and London. His mother is from Macau and is of mixed Asian, African and European descent. His father is of Anglo-Irish descent. He has an MA degree in creative writing from Manchester Metropolitan University's Manchester Writing School, where he graduated in 2016.

== Writing ==
Humphreys participated in The Complete Works poets of colour mentoring scheme initiated by Bernardine Evaristo to redress representational invisibility. The scheme was directed by Dr Nathalie Teitler between 2007 and 2017, during which time 30 poets were mentored.

In 2017, Humphreys was featured in Ten: Poets of the New Generation (Bloodaxe Books). He is the author of the poetry collection Zebra (Nine Arches Press, 2019). His poems have been longlisted in the National Poetry Competition and his fiction has been shortlisted three times for the Bridport Prize. His work has been published in The Poetry Review, The Rialto and Magma. He won the Hamish Canham Prize and was highly commended in the Forward Prizes for Poetry.

Humphreys was the editor of Why I Write Poetry (Nine Arches Press, 2021) and the producer and co-editor of an anthology on Sylvia Plath entitled After Sylvia: Poems and Essays in Celebration of Sylvia Plath (Nine Arches, 2022). He is a guest editor at Butcher's Dog poetry magazine.

His second collection, Tormentil, won a Royal Society of Literature "Literature Matters" Award as a work in progress in 2022, with a September 2023 publication date from Nine Arches.

Humphreys was announced as the Brontë Parsonage Museum's writer-in-residence for 2023/24.

== Awards and honours ==
- 2016: Hamish Canham Prize
- 2018: Highly commended in the Forward Prizes for Poetry
- 2019: Portico Prize
- 2022: RSL Literature Matters Award
