= Ian Holding =

Zimbabwean writer

Ian Holding (born Neal Hovelmeier; 29 March 1978), is a Caucasian Zimbabwean writer. His first novel, Unfeeling was critically acclaimed on publication in the United Kingdom in 2005, and was one of the first fictional attempts dealing with the complex political and social situation in Zimbabwe, in particular the country's controversial Land Reform Programme. According to South African commentator and academic, Michiel Heyns, "one of the achievements of this remarkable novel is to obtrude, without preaching or moralising, a much more thoughtful and critical assessment of power relations in Zimbabwe." The novel was shortlisted for the 2006 Dylan Thomas Prize and was named as "One of the Year's Best Books" by both Newsweek and The Globe & Mail.

Holding's second novel, Of Beasts and Beings (Simon & Schuster), an allegory on the nature of "white guilt" and colonialism was released in August 2010 and received favourable reviews for its blend of realism, postmodernism and metafictional techniques. The influential American writer Alice Sebold described the novel as "merciless, poetic and beautiful". The novel was released as one of the inaugural titles of a new imprint of the American publisher Europa Editions in November 2011.

His third novel, What Happened to Us, was published by Little Island Press in 2018.

In addition to being a Hawthornden Fellow, Ian Holding frequently contributes articles and essays to prominent journals and newspapers and is also a short-story writer.

A native Harare, Zimbabwe, he fled the country after being outed as gay.
