= Shambala Festival =

Music festival in Northamptonshire, England

Revellers at Shambala festival

Revellers at Shambala festival

The Shambala Festival is an annual four-day music festival in Northamptonshire, England. The daily capacity of the festival is 15,000 people and although the exact location is not disclosed until attendees buy a ticket, the event has frequently been held at Kelmarsh Hall in Northamptonshire. The event first took place in 2000.

It features a variety of music, including rock, pop, folk and world music. There are also independent films, workshops, talks and debates, comedy, a fresh organic market, fair trade coffee, practical demonstrations, a speakers' corner, site art (a new art trail and a range of get-involved sculpture) and "music with a mission". Permaculturists from across the UK create a welcoming garden/ workshop space incorporating art, crafts and sounds. Many activities address cultural awareness, the environment and rights. Children are able to add their messages to the Rights Tree, to be posted on the website. Kids' activities include a full and diverse program of activities for all ages, such as creative workshops (e.g. shadow dancing), trampolines, circus fun, games, music, and a samba procession on Sunday.

Many attendees dress in costumes in accordance with the annual theme.

In April 2026, it became the first worker-owned festival in the United Kingdom after Kambe Events announced the founders will transfer the business to workers under an employee ownership trust.

== Accidents and incidents ==
During the 2023 festival where he was due to perform, the poet Gboyega Odubanjo died in an accidental drowning. He had been reported as missing for several days before his body was found.
