= Arinze Ifeakandu =

Nigerian fiction writer

- Nigerian Writer, Arinze Ifeakandu at CCA during Obodo Nigeria, Fiction Writing Masterclass
- Born: 1995 (age 30–31)
- Education: University of Nigeria, Nsukka; University of Iowa
- Occupation: Writer
- Writing career
- Genres: Fiction, poetry
- Notable work: God's Children Are Little Broken Things (2022)
- Notable awards: Dylan Thomas Prize, O. Henry Prize
- Website: arinzeifeakandu.com

Arinze Ifeakandu is a Nigerian writer known for the collection of his short stories, God's Children Are Little Broken Things, which won the Dylan Thomas Prize and the Republic of Consciousness Prize US and Canada, and was shortlisted for the Kirkus Prize, the Lambda Awards, and received the Story Prize's Spotlight Award. He also won an O. Henry Prize for one of the stories.

== Education and early life ==
Ifeakandu attended the University of Nigeria, Nsukka and the Iowa Writers' Workshop. He was born in Kano, Nigeria.

== Literary career ==
Ifeakandu's short story collection, God's Children Are Little Broken Things, was published by A Public Space Books in 2022. Kirkus Reviews gave it a rave:

The stories in Ifeakandu's debut collection are nothing less than breathtaking and daring, each exploring queer relationships in all their nuanced and unpredictable configurations: secret romances, brief but passionate encounters, relationships that are tested by cultural pressures.

In a 5-star review, Open Country Mag called it "a momentous debut of gay love and human fullness", writing:

Stripped to its most important relationships, God’s Children narrates youthful love in a country where being gay is difficult. Lush with evocative passages, it uncompromisingly follows the promise and pains of its characters. So real are they, you could almost reach out and touch them; so easily could you make their complications yours, untangling their excesses and poring over the minute details. Ifeakandu does not sacrifice flow; in this book, sentences curl like perfect ocean waves on a bright day.

The Times Literary Supplement described the characters as "by necessity virtuosos of concealment and students of contrasting masculinities. When they’re alone together they express themselves tenderly, and sometimes camp it up; in public they can’t risk standing out." i-D portrayed the stories as "bitter sweet" and Ifeakandu as "a master observer."

The Irish Times wrote that the stories "depict queer love in all its beauty, strength, and frailty." The Common suggested that "Ifeakandu deserves to be widely read for a precise, elegant, and erotic individual voice melded to a breadth of cultural material; he makes each character’s particular experiences feel universal, and the reader ache and love along with them."

== Publications ==
- God's Children Are Little Broken Things (A Public Space Books, 2022)

== Honours ==
- An AKO Caine Prize for African Writing finalist - 2017
- A Public Space Writing Fellow - 2015
- O. Henry Prize for Short Fiction - 2023
