= Sam Willetts =

English poet

Sam Willetts (born 1962) is an English poet. He was born and raised in Oxford. His father Harry Willetts was a noted scholar and translator of Russian at St Antony's College, Oxford. Sam studied English at Wadham College. He has struggled with drug addiction and homelessness. His first book of poems New Light for the Old Dark (2010) was nominated for the Forward Prize for Poetry, the Costa Book Award for Poetry and the T. S. Eliot Prize.

== Awards ==
Year	Work	Award	Category	Result	Ref.
2010	New Light for the Old Dark	Costa Book Awards	Poetry	Shortlisted	
2010	New Light for the Old Dark	Forward Prizes for Poetry	First Collection	Shortlisted	
2010	New Light for the Old Dark	T. S. Eliot Prize	—	Shortlisted	

== Bibliography ==
- New Light for the Old Dark (2010)
