= Julia Copus =

British poet, biographer and children's writer

Julia Celina Copus
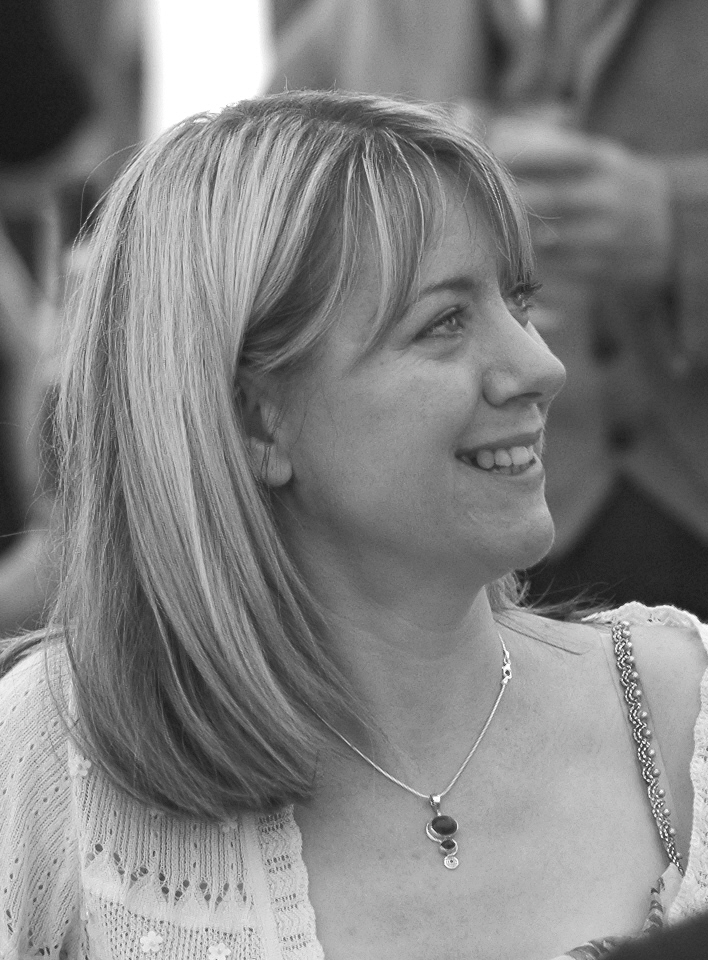
- Copus in 2007
- Born: 16 July 1969 (age 57); London Borough of Lambeth, England
- Education: Durham University
- Occupation: Poet
- Writing career
- Notable awards: Forward Prize for Best Single Poem; Eric Gregory Award
- Website: Official website

Julia Copus FRSL (born 1969) is a British poet, biographer and children's writer.

== Early life and education ==
Copus was born in London and grew up with three brothers, two of whom went on to become musicians. She attended The Mountbatten School, a large comprehensive in Romsey, and Peter Symonds Sixth Form College in Winchester. She went on to study Latin at St Mary's College, Durham.

== Career ==
Copus' books of poetry include The Shuttered Eye (Bloodaxe, 1995), which won her an Eric Gregory Award and was shortlisted for the Forward Prize for Best First Collection, the pamphlet Walking in the Shadows (1994), which won the Poetry Business competition, In Defence of Adultery (Bloodaxe, 2003), The World's Two Smallest Humans (Faber, 2012), shortlisted for both the Costa Book Award for Poetry and the T. S. Eliot Prize, and Girlhood (Faber 2019), winner of the inaugural Derek Walcott Prize for Poetry. She is known for establishing a new form in English poetry, which she has called the specular form, in which the second half of the poem mirrors the first, using the same lines but in reverse order and differently punctuated.

Eenie Meenie Macka Racka (an original 45-minute play for radio) was first broadcast on BBC Radio 4 in September, 2003, having been commissioned after Copus won the BBC's Alfred Bradley Bursary Award for Best New Radio Playwright in 2002. In the same year, she won First Prize in the National Poetry Competition with Breaking the Rule.

Copus was a Royal Literary Fund Fellow at the University of Exeter in 2005, 2006 and 2007, and the following year was made an RLF Advisory Fellow and awarded an Honorary Fellowship at the University of Exeter. In 2010, she won the Forward Prize for Best Single Poem for An Easy Passage, and in 2020 her collection Girlhood was awarded the inaugural Derek Walcott Prize for best collection by a non-US citizen. She has been on the judging panel for a number of literary prizes, including the Geoffrey Faber Memorial Prize, the Ted Hughes Award, the Costa Book Award, the UK's National Poetry Competition, the Encore Award for best second novel, the Michael Marks Awards for Poetry Pamphlets, the T. S. Eliot Prize for poetry, the Winchester Poetry Prize and the Tower Poetry Competition for 16-18 year olds, run by Christ Church, Oxford.

Copus has written four picture books: Hog in the Fog, The Hog, The Shrew and the Hullabaloo (Faber 2015), The Shrew that Flew (Faber 2016) and My Bed is an Air Balloon (Faber 2018).

== Personal life ==
She lives in Blackheath, London, with her husband, Andrew Stevenson.

== Publications ==
=== Poetry collections ===
- The Shuttered Eye, Bloodaxe Books 1995. ISBN 9781852243388
- In Defence of Adultery, Bloodaxe Books 2003. ISBN 9781852246075
- The World's Two Smallest Humans, Faber 2012. ISBN 9780571284580
- Girlhood, Faber 2019. ISBN 9780571351060

=== For children ===
- The Landlord's Cat, Out of the Ark Music 2010 (with Antony Copus)
- A Harry & Lil story: Hog in the Fog, Faber 2014
- A Harry & Lil story: The Hog, the Shrew and the Hullabaloo, Faber 2015
- A Harry & Lil story: The Shrew that Flew, Faber 2016
- My Bed is an Air Balloon, Faber 2018

=== As editor ===
- Life Support: 100 Poems to Reach for on Dark Nights (Head of Zeus 2019)
- Charlotte Mew: Selected Poems and Prose (Faber 2019)

=== Non-fiction ===
- This Rare Spirit: A Life of Charlotte Mew, Faber 2021
- Brilliant Writing Tips for Students, Palgrave Macmillan 2009

=== For radio ===
- Eenie Meenie Macka Racka, afternoon play, BBC Radio 4, September 2003
- The Enormous Radio (based on the short story by John Cheever), afternoon play, BBC Radio 4, July 2008
- Ghost Lines, a sequence of poems for radio, BBC Radio 3, December 2011
- The Heart of Hidden Things, on the life and work of Charlotte Mew, BBC Radio 4, November 2019

=== Audio ===
- Julia Copus Reading from Her Poems, (CD) The Poetry Archive 2010

== Awards and Fellowships ==
- 1994 Eric Gregory Award (Society of Authors)
- 1997 The Shuttered Eye shortlisted for Forward Poetry Prize for Best First Collection
- 2002 National Poetry Competition, First Prize - 'Breaking the Rule'
- 2002 BBC Alfred Bradley Award for Best New Radio Playwright, Eenie Meenie Macka Racka
- 2005 Arts Council Writers' Award
- 2005–2007 Royal Literary Fund Fellow, University of Exeter
- 2008 Honorary Fellowship, University of Exeter
- 2010 Forward Poetry Prize (Best Single Poem), 'An Easy Passage'
- 2011 Ghost Lines shortlisted for Ted Hughes Award for New Work in Poetry
- 2012 Costa Book Awards (poetry category), shortlist, The World's Two Smallest Humans
- 2012 T. S. Eliot Prize, shortlist, The World's Two Smallest Humans
- 2014 Authors' Foundation Grant (Society of Authors)
- 2018 Inducted as a Fellow of the Royal Society of Literature
- 2020 Derek Walcott Prize for Poetry, for Girlhood
- 2023–2024 Royal Literary Fund Fellow, V&A Museum and Science Museum Group
- 2024 Cholmondeley Award
