= Harry Willetts =

English scholar and translator (1922–2005)

Harry Taylor Willetts (6 September 1922 – 7 April 2005) was an English scholar of Russian, and English language translator of Russian literature.

== Early life ==
In 1922, Willetts was born. Willetts' father was Albert Willetts. Willetts' mother was Alice Taylor.

== Education ==
From 1940 to 1947, Willetts studied at The Queen's College, Oxford.

== Career ==
After 1947, Willetts joined the Foreign Office in the Moscow embassy. Willetts joined St Antony's College, Oxford in 1960.

Willetts was professor of Russian history at Oxford University. He was director of the Russian and East European Centre at St Antony's College, where his colleagues included the noted Russian scholars Max Hayward, Harry Shukman and William Deakin.

A prolific translator of Russian literature, Willetts is best known for his translations of the works of the Nobel Prize winner Alexander Solzhenitsyn. As a translator, he is often credited as H.T. Willetts.

== Personal life ==
In 1957 Willetts married Halina Szenbaum, a Polish Jew, in London, England.

Willetts had three children: Sam, Cathy and Isobel.

Willetts was preceded in death by his wife Halina. Their son Sam Willetts became a poet.
