= A Public Space =

American literary magazine

- First issue
- Editor: Brigid Hughes
- Categories: Literary magazine
- Frequency: Triannual
- Founded: 2006
- First issue: April 2006
- Company: A Public Space Literary Projects, Inc.
- Country: United States
- Based in: Brooklyn, New York
- Language: English
- Website: apublicspace.org
- ISSN: 1558-965X

A Public Space is an independent nonprofit publisher of an eponymous literary and arts magazine and book imprint. The organization's magazine, A Public Space, is a triannual, English-language literary journal based in Brooklyn, New York. First circulated in April 2006, A Public Space publishes fiction, poetry, essays, and visual art. The magazine's Focus portfolios have examined the writing of a different country each issue, covering the literature of Japan, Russia, and Peru in Issues 1-3. In 2018, A Public Space launched its book imprint, A Public Space Books, which publishes around three titles a year.

== History and profile ==
The magazine was founded in 2006 by Brigid Hughes, former Executive Editor of The Paris Review. The magazine is published triannually. In its debut issue in 2006, Hughes stated that the journal's mission was to be “A literary forum for the stories behind the news, a fragment of an overheard conversation, a peek at the novel the person next to you on the subway is reading, the life you invent for the man in front of you at the supermarket checkout line. Ideas and stories about the things that confront us, amuse us, confound us, intrigue us.”

The magazine has been described as having a "focus on experimentation," seeking "hybrid, genre-bending, miscellaneous pieces that might struggle to find a home in more mainstream journals."

Authors such as Marilynne Robinson, Jesmyn Ward, Haruki Murakami, Charles D'Ambrosio, Rick Moody, Anna Deavere Smith, Kelly Link, Sreyash Sarkar, Daniel Alarcón, Juan Manuel Chavez, Santiago Roncagliolo, Miguel Gutierrez, Jillian Weise, Keith Lee Morris, Jonathan Lethem, Martha Cooley, Anne Carson, Delia Falconer, David Levi Strauss, Nam Le, Ander Monson, Maile Chapman, Antoine Wilson, Kimiko Hahn, and Garth Greenwell have all contributed.

== Awards ==
A Public Space was named Best New Literary Magazine by The Village Voice in December 2006. In 2011, Brigid Hughes received the PEN/Nora Magid Award for Magazine Editing for "her commitment to quality literature and for her larger purpose." In 2018, the magazine received the inaugural Whiting Literary Magazine Prize in the print category for its "gorgeously curated collection we experience as a cabinet of wonders."

In 2023, two authors from A Public Space Books received national and international recognition. Ada Zhang was named a National Book Foundation 5 Under 35 honoree for her debut story collection The Sorrows of Others (A Public Space Books), and Arinze Ifeakandu was awarded the Dylan Thomas Prize for his debut story collection God's Children Are Little Broken Things (A Public Space Books).

In 2026, Mahreen Sohail was awarded a PEN/Faulkner Award for Fiction for her debut story collection Small Scale Sinners (A Public Space Books).

== See also ==
- List of literary magazines
