= Jay Bernard (writer) =

British writer, artist, film programmer, and activist (born 1988)

Jay Bernard FRSL
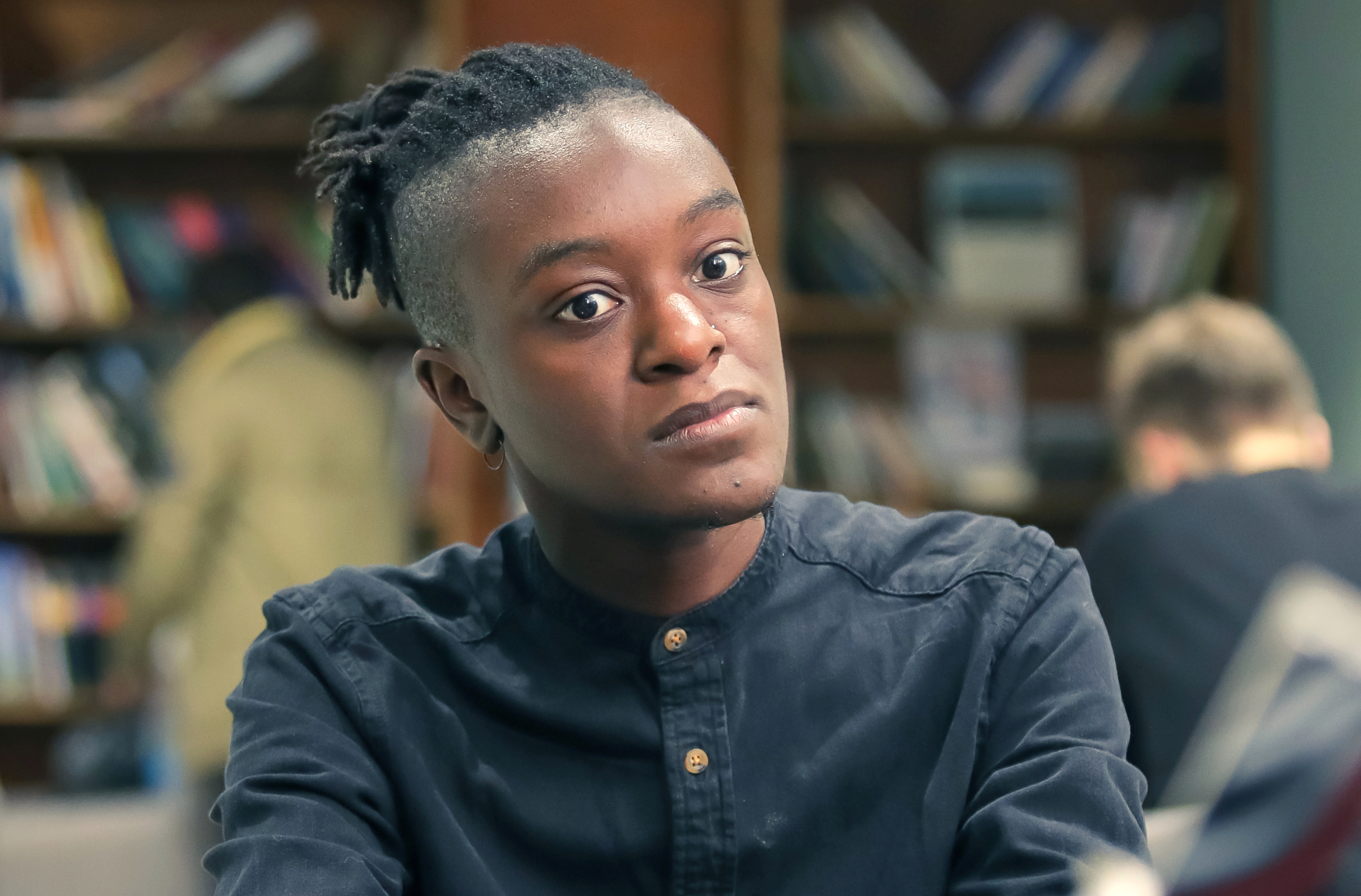
- Born: 1988 (age 37–38); London, U.K.
- Education: Oxford University
- Occupations: Writer, artist, film programmer, and activist
- Notable work: Surge (2019)

Jay Bernard FRSL (born 1988) is a British writer, artist, film programmer, and activist from London, UK. Bernard has been a programmer at BFI Flare since 2014 and co-editor of Oxford Poetry, and their fiction, non-fiction, and art has been published in many national and international magazines and newspapers.

== Career ==
Bernard was named a Foyle Young Poet of the Year in 2005. Bernard was selected for The Complete Works programme in 2014.

Bernard's pamphlet The Red and Yellow Nothing was shortlisted for the Ted Hughes Award in 2016. The collection tells the story of Sir Morien, a black knight at Camelot. The reviewer for The London Magazine wrote: "Jay Bernard has created a rare and beautiful thing. Part contemporary verse drama, part mythic retelling ... Employing metrical ballads and concrete poems with equal vigour, Bernard takes us on a visual and allusive journey to test the imagination, thus putting the poet's resources of sight and sound to full use ... reading The Red and Yellow Nothing brings continuous surprise."

Bernard won the 2017 Ted Hughes Award for their multimedia performance work Surge: Side A, that includes the film Something Said, inspired by the 1981 New Cross house fire and archives held at the George Padmore Institute, where they were the first poet-in-residence. The 2014 novel A Brief History of Seven Killings by Marlon James, and Twilight City, a film produced by Reece Auguiste for the Black Audio Film Collective in 1989, also inspired the work.

Bernard was elected a Fellow of the Royal Society of Literature in 2018.

Bernard's poetry collection Surge, published by Chatto & Windus, was shortlisted for the T. S. Eliot Prize in 2019, for the 2019 Costa Book Award for Poetry, for the 2020 Dylan Thomas Prize, and the 2020 RSL Ondaatje Prize. It won the 2020 Sunday Times Young Writer of the Year Award.

== Personal life ==
Bernard grew up in London, and read English at Oxford University. Bernard identifies as "black, queer", and uses the pronouns they/them. Their Jamaican-born grandmother, Gee Bernard, was the first black councillor in Croydon and the first black member of the Inner London Education Authority.

== Awards, honors ==
=== Literary awards ===
Year	Book	Award	Category	Result	Ref
2005	—	Foyle Young Poets of the Year	—	Won	
2016	The Red and Yellow Nothing	Ted Hughes Award	—	Shortlisted	
2017	Surge: Side A	Ted Hughes Award	—	Won	
2019	Surge	Costa Book Award	Poetry	Shortlisted	
2019	Surge	T. S. Eliot Prize	—	Shortlisted	
2020	Surge	Dylan Thomas Prize	—	Shortlisted	
2020	Surge	Ondaatje Prize	—	Shortlisted	
2020	Surge	Polari Prize	Polari First Book Prize	Longlisted	
2020	Surge	Sunday Times Young Writer of the Year Award	—	Won	

=== Residencies ===
- 2010: artist in residence at StAnza Poetry Festival.
- 2012: fellow at the National University of Singapore, and curated a graphic arts and poetry exhibition I SEE YOU at The Arts House.
- 2013: CityRead resident at the London Metropolitan Archives.
- 2015: commissioned with artist Yemisi Blake as part of Transport for London's Year of the Bus celebrations. Their work 100, which featured one hundred one-line poems, was displayed at North Greenwich Bus Station between January and September 2015.

== Filmography ==
=== Films ===
- Something Said — screened at Encounters Festival (2017), CinemAfrica (2018), BFI Flare (2018).

== Biblio ==
=== Pamphlets and single-author collections ===
- —— (2008). Your Sign is Cuckoo, Girl. Tall Lighthouse. ISBN 9781904551416. Pamphlet.
- —— (2013). English Breakfast. Math Paper Press. Pamphlet.
- —— (2016). The Red and Yellow Nothing. Ink, Sweat and Tears Press. ISBN 9780992725310. Pamphlet.
- —— (2017). Other Ubiquities. Self-published.
- —— (2019). Surge. Chatto. ISBN 9781784742614.

=== Performances ===
- Surge: Side A (2017), a multimedia performance piece that won the Ted Hughes Award for new poetry. The work was performed at the Roundhouse, London, during The Last Word Festival 2017, and was produced by Speaking Volumes.
- A Toast to the People (2021) Jay Bernard also performed at the Edinburgh International Festival, a spoken word event with Debris Stephenson.

=== Inclusion in anthologies and collections ===
Graphic art and poetry by Bernard appears in the following collections:

- City State (2009)
- "Black Britain: Beyond Definition", Wasafiri, Issue 64, Winter 2010.
- The Salt Book of Younger Poets (Salt 2011)
- Ten: The New Wave (Bloodaxe 2014)

=== Further work and collaborations ===
- 2022: After Work, made in collaboration with Céline Condorelli and Ben Rivers focuses on the building of a children's playground, which Condorelli was commissioned to create in South London.
