= Denise Riley =

English poet and philosopher

Denise Riley (born 1948 in Carlisle) is an English poet and philosopher.

== Life ==
Riley lives in London. She was educated for a year at Somerville College, Oxford, and graduated from New Hall, Cambridge. She was, until recently, Professor of Literature with Philosophy at the University of East Anglia and is currently A. D. White Professor-at-large at Cornell University.

Her visiting positions also included a writer in Residence at the Tate Gallery in London and visiting fellow at Birkbeck College in the University of London. She was formerly a Writer in Residence at Tate Gallery London, and has held fellowships at Brown University and at Birkbeck, University of London.

Among her poetry publications are Penguin Modern Poets 10, with Douglas Oliver and Iain Sinclair (1996).

== Work ==
Her poetry interrogates self-hood within the lyrical mode. Her critical writings are on motherhood, women in history, "identity", and philosophy of language.

Her poetry collections include Marxism for Infants (1977); the volume No Fee (1979), with Wendy Mulford; Dry Air (1985); Stair Spirit (1992); Mop Mop Georgette (1993); Selected Poems (2000); Say Something Back (2016), which was nominated for a Forward Prize for Best Poetry Collection; and Lurex (2022). Riley’s non-fiction prose includes War in the Nursery: Theories of the Child and Mother (1983); 'Am I That Name?': Feminism and the Category of Women in History (1988); The Words of Selves: Identification, Solidarity, Irony (2000); and Impersonal Passion: Language as Affect (2005).

== Awards and honors ==
- 2012 Forward Poetry Prize, Best Single Poem, "A Part Song"
- 2012 Ted Hughes Award, shortlist
- 2016 Forward Poetry Prize, Shortlisted, Best Collection, Say Something Back
- 2017 Griffin Poetry Prize, Shortlisted, International, Say Something Back
- 2019 elected Fellow of the Royal Society of Literature

== Bibliography ==
Poetry:

- Marxism for Infants, Cambridge, UK: Street Editions, 1977.
- No Fee (with Wendy Mulford), Cambridge, UK: Street Editions, 1978.
- Dry Air, London: Virago: 1985, ISBN 0-86068-539-X.
- Mop Mop Georgette: New and Selected Poems 1986-1993, London: Reality Street Editions, 1993, ISBN 1-874400-04-0.
- Penguin Modern Poets 10 (with Douglas Oliver and Iain Sinclair), Harmondsworth, UK: Penguin Books, 1996.
- Denise Riley: Selected Poems, London: Reality Street, 2000.
- Say Something Back, London: Picador, 2016.
- Szantung, Lodz: Dom Literatury, 2019 (English-Polish bilingual edition, selected and translated by Jerzy Jarniewicz) ISBN 978-83-66318-04-5.
- Selected Poems, London: Picador 2019 ISBN 978-1529017120
- Lurex, London: Picador 2022 ISBN 978-1529078138

Non-fiction:

- War in the Nursery: Theories of the Child and Mother, Virago, 1983, ISBN 0-86068-273-0.
- "Am I That Name?": Feminism and the Category of "Women" in History, Macmillan, 1988, ISBN 0-8166-4269-9.
- Poets on Writing: Britain 1970-1991, Macmillan, 1992.
- The Words of Selves: Identification, Solidarity, Irony, Stanford University Press, 2000, ISBN 0-8047-3911-0.
- The Force of Language (Denise Riley with Jean-Jacques Lecercle), Palgrave Macmillan, 2004 ISBN 1-4039-4248-X.
- Impersonal Passion: Language as Affect, Duke University Press, 2004, ISBN 0-8223-3512-3.
- Stephen Heath, Colin MacCabe and Denise Riley, editors, The Language, Discourse, Society Reader, Palgrave, 2004, ISBN 0-333-76372-6.
- Time Lived, Without Its Flow, Capsule Editions, 2012, ISBN 978-0-9571395-0-3.
- Riley, Denise (May 2017). "On the Lapidary Style" (PDF). differences: A Journal of Feminist Cultural Studies. 28 (1). Duke University Press: 17–36. doi:10.1215/10407391-3821676.
