= Will Harris (poet) =

English poet (born 1989)

- Harris in 2020
- Born: 1989 (age 36–37)
- Occupation: Poet
- Writing career
- Notable work: RENDANG (2020)
- Notable awards: Forward Prizes for Poetry

Will Harris (born 1989) is a London-based poet of Chinese Indonesian and British heritage. His debut poetry book RENDANG won the Forward Prize for Best First Collection and was shortlisted for the T. S. Eliot Prize 2021. His poem SAY was shortlisted for the Forward Prize for Best Single Poem in 2018. In 2019, Harris received a Poetry Fellowship from the Arts Foundation.

RENDANG was described by the London Review of Books as "one of the most hotly-anticipated debut poetry collections of 2020," by The Guardian as "a sharp and assured debut collection that meditates on the multiplicity of identity", and by the Financial Times as "poems that brim with soul and playfulness." RENDANG was longlisted for the 2021 Dylan Thomas Prize and shortlisted for the John Pollard Foundation International Poetry Prize, 2021.

Harris's essay Mixed-Race Superman was published in the UK by Peninsula Press and by Melville House in the US. It was described by The New York Times as "a zany, exuberant and highly original meditation on what it means to come of age as a mixed-race person in a predominantly white world" and by The Times Literary Supplement as "meditat[ing] wisely on this potentially awkward yet not exactly uncommon state of in-betweenness".

Harris was mentored on The Complete Works poets of colour mentoring scheme initiated by Bernardine Evaristo to redress representational invisibility.

== Work ==
- —— (2018). Mixed-Race Superman. Peninsula Press. ISBN 9781612197906.
- —— (2020). RENDANG. Granta Books. ISBN 9781783785599.
- —— (2023). Brother Poem. Granta Books. ISBN 9781915051042.

== Awards ==
- 2017: London Review Bookshop Pamphlet of the Year, All This Is Implied
- 2020: Forward Poetry Prize for Best First Collection, RENDANG
