= Brigid Hughes =

Brooklyn, New York-based literary editor

- Born: Buffalo, New York, U.S.
- Occupation: literary editor
- Years active: 1996–present

Brigid Hughes is a New York City-based literary editor. Hughes is best known for succeeding George Plimpton as the editor of the literary magazine The Paris Review after his death in 2003 and for founding the literary magazine A Public Space in 2006.

== Early life and education ==
Hughes was born and grew up in Buffalo, New York. Her parents are Patrick Hughes, a doctor, and Patricia Hughes, a research nurse.

In 1990, she graduated from the Nichols School.

In 1994, Hughes received a bachelor's degree in English from Northwestern University.

== Career ==
After graduating from Northwestern University, Hughes moved to New York and in 1995 started a job as an intern at The Paris Review before being hired there full-time later that year.

For three years she served as managing editor. After the death of editor George Plimpton, Hughes became editor and continued its tradition of accepting unsolicited submissions (the 'slush pile') as an important part of the role of smaller journals to promote new writers. Hughes left the position after only one year, when the (newly created) Board of Directors did not renew her contract, appointing Philip Gourevitch.

After leaving The Paris Review, Hughes founded A Public Space, a nonprofit quarterly English-language literary and arts magazine based in New York City, in 2006. Under Hughes' editorship, A Public Space has gained a reputation for spotting and publishing writers before they become widely known – two-time National Book Award winner Jesmyn Ward's first published short story, "Cattle Haul," appeared in A Public Space in January 2008. Leslie Jamison, Nam Le, Jamel Brinkley, and Jamil Jan Kochai also debuted in the magazine. Hughes rediscovered the work of Bette Howland and the writing of filmmaker Kathleen Collins.

In 2007, Hughes was co-curator with Peter Conroy and Jake Perlin of the Between the Lines arts festival at the Brooklyn Academy of Music. She is a frequent speaker and panelist at literary conferences, including the Lannan Foundation and PEN America.

In 2012, Hughes became a contributing editor to Graywolf Press and A Public Space launched a partnership with the press to publish books by the magazine's contributors. In 2019, A Public Space launched an independent book imprint, A Public Space Books.

Hughes has received the PEN/Nora Magid Award for Editing and the CLMP Award for Paradigm Independent Publishing. In 2018, A Public Space received the inaugural Whiting Literary Magazine Prize, with the judges' citation recognizing the magazine as "a gorgeously curated collection we experience as a cabinet of wonders."

Hughes teaches in Columbia University's MFA program.

== Works and publications ==
- Howland, Bette, Calm Sea and Prosperous Voyage: Selected Stories. Hughes, Brigid, editor. A Public Space Books. ISBN 978-0-9982675-0-0
- Tolstoy Together: 85 Days of War and Peace with Yiyun Li. Hughes, Brigid, editor. A Public Space Books. ISBN 978-1-7345907-6-0
- Park, Ed; Hughes, Brigid, eds. (2015). Buffalo Noir. Brooklyn, NY: Akashic Books. ISBN 978-1-617-75421-0. OCLC 907677036.
