= Hannah Lowe =

British writer (born 1976)

Hannah Lowe FRSL
- Born: 1976 (age 49–50); Ilford, Essex, England
- Education: University of Sussex; Newcastle University
- Occupation: Writer
- Notable work: Chick (2013); Long Time, No See (2015); The Kids (2021)
- Awards: Costa Book Award for poetry
- Website: hannahlowe.org

Hannah Lowe FRSL (born 1976) is a British writer, known for her collection of poetry Chick (2013), her family memoir Long Time, No See (2015) and her research into the historicising of the HMT Empire Windrush and postwar Caribbean migration to Britain. Her 2021 book The Kids won the Costa Book of the Year award.

== Biography ==
Lowe was born in Ilford, Essex, in 1976. She studied American Literature at the University of Sussex, and has a master's degree in Refugee Studies, subsequently completing a PhD in Creative Writing at Newcastle University. She taught English Literature at a London sixth form, and went on to teach Creative Writing at Oxford Brookes University, Kingston University. She now lectures at Brunel University of London (BUL).

Lowe began writing poetry at the age of 29 after her Jamaican-Chinese father died and her English mother had a stroke, later reflecting: "I had been suppressing a lot of grief over a sustained period of time and poetry... opened a door on that pain. I found that I could revisit the past in my poems, and contain it, or alter it even."

Following a suggestion by John Glenday at a course in 2010, Lowe began to write about her father — who had sailed from Jamaica to Britain on the SS Ormonde in 1947 — and this led to her debut poetry collection Chick, published by Bloodaxe Books in 2013. This work was shortlisted for the Forward and Fenton Adelburgh First Collection Prizes. In September 2014, the Poetry Book Society included Lowe in its list of Next Generation Poets, published each decade. In 2015, Chick won the Michael Murphy Memorial Award for Best First Collection.

Lowe's family memoir Long Time, No See was published by Periscope in July 2015 and was featured on BBC Radio 4's Book of the Week. Lowe cites Gerard Manley Hopkins, Anne Sexton, and Mark Doty as influences for her work.

Lowe's 2018 chapbook The Neighbourhood, published by Out-Spoken in 2018, is a social commentary on communities and gentrification that emerged from her role as poet-in-residence at Keats House, London. In 2020, she won a Cholmondeley Award from the Society of Authors. Her collection, The Kids, was published by Bloodaxe in 2021. It was shortlisted for the 2021 T. S. Eliot Prize.

Lowe's 2021 book of sonnets, titled The Kids, was based on her 10 years of experience teaching in an inner-city London sixth-form centre, City and Islington College, during the 2000s, as well as drawing on her own experiences as a teenager and as a mother. She said in an interview in The Guardian: "I was trying to destabilise that relationship between the teacher and student – the idea of the teacher being the figure with knowledge to impart, and the student as the passive receptacle. It was never like that in the classroom for me." The Irish Times said that "the power of Lowe's use of the sonnet feels akin to controlling a classroom – the form acts to hold and strain against the blustering energy of the students and the teacher. The Kids is an honest and intelligent book." The Kids won the Costa Book Award for Poetry in 2021 and was later chosen as the overall Costa Book of the Year for 2021, with chair of judges Reeta Chakrabarti describing it as "a book to fall in love with – it's joyous, it's warm and it's completely universal. It's crafted and skilful but also accessible."

In May 2022, Lowe's two new poetry chapbooks – Old Friends and Rock, Bird, Butterfly – were published by Hercules Editions.

Lowe was elected a Fellow of the Royal Society of Literature in 2022.

== Bibliography ==
- The Hitcher (32 pages), 2011
- Chick, 2013, ISBN 9781852249601
- Ormonde (chapbook), 2014, ISBN 9780957273825
- Long Time, No See, 2015, ISBN 9781859643969
- Chan, 2016, ISBN 9781780372839
- The Neighbourhood, 2019, ISBN 9781999679224
- The Kids, 2021, ISBN 9781780375793
- Old Friends (chapbook), 2022
- Rock, Bird, Butterfly (chapbook), 2022
