= Gboyega Odubanjo =

British-Nigerian poet (1996–2023)

- Born: 30 January 1996; London, England
- Died: c. 31 August 2023 (aged 27); Kelmarsh, Northamptonshire, England
- Education: Doctor of Philosophy
- Alma mater: University of East Anglia, University of Hertfordshire
- Occupation: Poet
- Writing career
- Language: English

Gboyega Odubanjo (30 January 1996 – August 2023) was a British-Nigerian poet from South London, England.

== Early life and education ==
Gboyega Odubanjo was born on 30 January 1996, in London, England, where he also grew up.

Odubanjo attended the University of East Anglia between 2014 and 2019. He earned his Bachelor's degree in English and Philosophy in 2017, and his Master's degree in poetry in 2018. He was studying for a PhD in creative writing at the University of Hertfordshire at the time of his death.

Gboyega was posthumously awarded a Doctor of Philosophy by the University of Hertfordshire for a programme of work entitled Adam: Fear of a Black Planet, as his work had been completed before his death.

== Career ==
Odubanjo's first pamphlet, While I Yet Live, was published in 2019 by Bad Betty Press. This was followed by Aunty Uncle Poems, which won the Poetry Business Competition. After his death, Faber announced that Adam, a first full-length collection, would be published in 2024. The book revisits the unsolved murder of an unidentified black boy whose body was discovered in the River Thames in 2001.

Odubanjo was a board member and former guest editor of Magma Poetry. He was the editor of bath magg, an online magazine of poetry, and an editor at independent publisher Bad Betty Press.

== Death ==
In August 2023, Odubanjo died in an accidental drowning at the Shambala Festival in Northamptonshire where he was due to perform. He had been reported as missing for several days before his body was found.

== Awards ==
=== Received ===
- 2020: Poetry Business New Poet's Prize for Aunty Uncle Poems
- 2021: Eric Gregory Award from the Society of Authors
- 2021: Michael Marks Pamphlet Award for Aunty Uncle Poems

=== Shortlisted ===
- 2020: OutSpoken Prize for Poetry for While I Yet Live
- 2024: T. S. Eliot Prize for Adam
