= Greta Stoddart =

English poet

- Born: 1966 (age 59–60); Henley-on-Thames, England
- Occupation: Poet
- Writing career
- Years active: 2001–present
- Notable awards: Geoffrey Faber Memorial Prize; Cholmondeley Award

Greta Stoddart is an English poet. She is best known for her poetry collections, At Home in the Dark, Salvation Jane, Alive Alive O, Fool and her radio play Who's there?.

== Life and career ==
Stoddart was born in 1966 in Henley-on-Thames, Oxfordshire. She spent her childhood in Oxford and Belgium. She graduated from the University of Manchester and studied acting in Paris and worked as a performer before becoming a full-time poet. Having taught at Goldsmiths, University of London and Bath Spa University, she now teaches for Poetry School UK.

Stoddart's first collection of poetry, At Home in the Dark, was published in 2001 and won the 2002 Geoffrey Faber Memorial Prize.

Her second collection, Salvation Jane, was published in 2009 and shortlisted for the 2008 Costa Book Award.

Her third collection, Alive Alive O, was published in 2015 and was shortlisted for the 2016 Roehampton Poetry Prize.

Her radio poem, Who’s there?, was broadcast on BBC Radio 4 and was shortlisted for the 2017 Ted Hughes Award.

Her fourth collection Fool was published in 2022.

She received a Cholmondeley Award in 2023
