= Hannah Sullivan =

British academic and poet (born 1979)

- Born: 3 January 1979 (age 47)
- Education: Notting Hill and Ealing High School
- Alma mater: Trinity College, Cambridge; London Consortium; Harvard University
- Occupations: Academic, poet
- Employer(s): Stanford University; New College, Oxford
- Writing career
- Notable works: Was It for This (2023); Three Poems (2018); The Work of Revision (2013)
- Notable awards: T. S. Eliot Prize (2018); John Pollard Foundation International Poetry Prize (2019); Philip Leverhulme Prize (2013)

Hannah Sullivan (born 3 January 1979) is a British academic and poet. She is the author of The Work of Revision (Harvard University Press, 2013), which won the Rose Mary Crawshay Prize and the University English Book Prize, as well as the poetry collection Three Poems (Faber, 2018), which won the T. S. Eliot Prize. She is associate professor of English literature at New College, Oxford.

== Biography ==
Sullivan attended Trinity College, Cambridge, earning a double starred first in Classics in 2000. She spent a year at Harvard University as a Kennedy Scholar, studying comparative literature, and subsequently obtained a Master of Research (M.Res) in cultural studies at the London Consortium. She returned to Harvard University to work on a PhD in English and American literature, which she received in 2008. She spent four years as an assistant professor of English literature at Stanford University before returning to England.

In 2013, Sullivan published The Work of Revision, an academic study of how revision and rewriting influenced the style of literary modernism, for which she received the 2014 Rose Mary Crawshay Prize and the 2014 University English Book Prize. On the basis of her first book, she was awarded a Philip Leverhulme Prize to write a second book on free verse.

In 2018, she published her first poetry collection, Three Poems (Faber), which won the prestigious T. S. Eliot Prize for the best new poetry collection published in Great Britain or Ireland.

Sullivan has been an associate professor of English at New College, Oxford since 2012. She lives in London with her husband and two children.

== Selected publications ==
- The Work of Revision. Harvard University Press. 2013. ISBN 978-0-674-07312-8.
- Three Poems. Faber and Faber. 2018. ISBN 978-0-571-33767-5.
- Was It for This. Faber and Faber. 2023. ISBN 978-0-571-36227-1.

== Awards and recognition ==
- T. S. Eliot Prize (2018)
- John Pollard Foundation International Poetry Prize (2018)
- Rose Mary Crawshay Prize (2014)
- Philip Leverhulme Prize (2013)
