= Dylan Thomas Prize =

British literary prize for young English language writers presented annually

The Dylan Thomas Prize is a leading prize for young writers presented annually. The prize, named in honour of the Welsh writer and poet Dylan Thomas, brings international prestige and a remuneration of £30,000 (~$46,000). It is open to published writers in the English language under the age of forty. The prize was originally awarded biennially but became an annual award in 2010. Entries for the prize are submitted by the publisher, editor, or agent; for theatre plays and screenplays, by the producer.

A Dylan Thomas literary prize was first awarded during the 1980s, known as the Dylan Thomas Award, following the campaign to have a plaque in the poet's memory placed in Westminster Abbey. Surplus income from a fund-raising concert sponsored by the television company HTV were donated to allow a prize of £1,000 to be awarded annually. After several years, the prize was discontinued for lack of finance. It was revived, in a different form, in 2004, sponsored by Electronic Data Systems, at that time one of Swansea's largest employers.

The prize honours its shortlisted finalists and annual winner for published work in the broad range of literary forms in which Dylan Thomas excelled, including poetry, prose, fictional drama, short story collections, novels, novellas, stage plays and screenplays. “We want the world to be aware of the Welsh interest in promoting new writing. Our Prize provides an inspiration for a whole new generation of writers throughout the English-speaking world,” said Peter Stead, Chair of The Dylan Thomas Prize.

== Recipients ==
Dylan Thomas Prize recipients
Year	Author	Title	Publisher	Result	Ref.
2006	Rachel Trezise	Fresh Apples		Winner	
2006	Liza Ward	Outside Valentine		Shortlist	
2006	James Scudamore	The Amnesia Clinic		Shortlist	
2006	Ian Holding	Unfeeling		Shortlist	
2006	Nick Laird	Utterly Monkey and To a Fault		Shortlist	
2006	Lucy Caldwell	Where They Were Missed		Shortlist	
2008	Nam Le	The Boat		Winner	
2008	Edward Hogan	Blackmoor		Shortlist	
2008	Ceridwen Dovey	Blood Kin		Shortlist	
2008	Dinaw Mengestu	Children of the Revolution		Shortlist	
2008	Ross Raisin	God's Own Country		Shortlist	
2008	Caroline Bird	Trouble Came to the Turnip		Shortlist	
2010	Elyse Fenton	Clamor		Winner	
2010	Emily Mackie	And This Is True		Shortlist	
2010	Nadifa Mohamed	Black Mamba Boy		Shortlist	
2010	Karan Mahajan	Family Planning		Shortlist	
2010	Eleanor Catton	The Rehearsal		Shortlist	
2010	Caroline Bird	Watering Can		Shortlist	
2011	Lucy Caldwell	The Meeting Point		Winner	
2011	Jacob McArthur Mooney	Folk		Shortlist	
2011	Annabel Pitcher	My Sister Lives on the Mantelpiece		Shortlist	
2011	Benjamin Hale	The Evolution of Bruno Littlemore		Shortlist	
2011	Téa Obreht	The Tiger's Wife		Shortlist	
2012	Maggie Shipstead	Seating Arrangements		Winner	
2012	D.W. Wilson	Once You Break A Knuckle		Shortlist	
2012	Tom Benn	The Doll Princess		Shortlist	
2012	Chibundu Onuzo	The Spider King's Daughter		Shortlist	
2012	Andrea Eames	The White Shadow		Shortlist	
2013	Claire Vaye Watkins	Battleborn		Winner	
2013	Majok Tulba	Beneath the Darkening Sky		Shortlist	
2013	Marli Roode	Call It Dog		Shortlist	
2013	Prajwal Parajuly	Land Where I Flee		Shortlist	
2013	James Brookes	Sins of the Leopard		Shortlist	
2013	Tim Leach	The Last King of Lydia		Shortlist	
2013	Jemma L. King	The Shape of a Forest		Shortlist	
2014	Joshua Ferris	To Rise Again at a Decent Hour		Winner	
2014	Eimear McBride	A Girl Is a Half-formed Thing		Shortlist	
2014	Owen Sheers	Mametz		Shortlist	
2014	Naomi Wood	Mrs. Hemingway		Shortlist	
2014	Kseniya Melnik	Snow in May		Shortlist	
2014	Kei Miller	The Cartographer Tries to Map a Way to Zion		Shortlist	
2014	Eleanor Catton	The Luminaries		Shortlist	
2016	Max Porter	Grief Is the Thing with Feathers		Winner	
2016	Frances Leviston	Disinformation		Shortlist	
2016	Andrew McMillan	Physical		Shortlist	
2016	Claire-Louise Bennett	Pond		Shortlist	
2016	Tania James	The Tusk that did the Damage		Shortlist	
2016	Sunjeev Sahota	The Year of the Runaways		Shortlist	
2017	Fiona McFarlane	The High Places	Farrar, Straus & Giroux	Winner	
2017	Anuk Arudpragasam	The Story of a Brief Marriage	Granta|	Shortlist	
2017	Alys Conran	Pigeon	Parthian Books	Shortlist	
2017	Luke Kennard	Cain	Penned in the Margins	Shortlist	
2017	Sarah Perry	The Essex Serpent	Serpent's Tail	Shortlist	
2017	Callan Wink	Dog Run Moon: Stories	Granta	Shortlist	
2017	Safiya Sinclair	Cannibal	University of Nebraska Press	Longlist	
2017	Jonathan Safran Foer	Here I Am	Farrar, Straus & Giroux	Longlist	
2017	Yaa Gyasi	Homegoing	Alfred A. Knopf	Longlist	
2017	Benjamin Hale	The Fat Artist and Other Stories	Picador / Farrar, Straus and Giroux	Longlist	
2017	Hannah Kohler	The Outside Lands	Picador / Farrar, Straus and Giroux	Longlist	
2017	Helen Oyeyemi	What Is Not Yours Is Not Yours	Picador / Farrar, Straus and Giroux	Longlist	
2018	Kayo Chingonyi	Kumukanda	Chatto & Windus	Winner	
2018	Sally Rooney	Conversations with Friends	Faber & Faber	Shortlist	
2018	Gwendoline Riley	First Love	Granta	Shortlist	
2018	Carmen Maria Machado	Her Body and Other Parties	Graywolf Press	Shortlist	
2018	Emily Ruskovich	Idaho	Vintage Books	Shortlist	
2018	Gabriel Tallent	My Absolute Darling	Fourth Estate / HarperCollins	Shortlist	
2019	Guy Gunaratne	In Our Mad and Furious City	Tinder Press / Headline Publishing Group	Winner	
2019	Zoe Gilbert	Folk	Bloomsbury Publishing	Shortlist	
2019	Nana Kwame Adjei-Brenyah	Friday Black	Houghton Mifflin Harcourt (US); Riverrun (UK)	Shortlist	
2019	Novuyo Rosa Tshuma	House of Stone	Atlantic Books	Shortlist	
2019	Sarah Perry	Melmoth	Serpent's Tail	Shortlist	
2019	Louisa Hall	Trinity	Ecco Press	Shortlist	
2019	Jenny Xie	Eye Level	Graywolf Press	Longlist	
2019	Michael Donkor	Hold	Fourth Estate / HarperCollins	Longlist	
2019	Clare Fisher	How the Light Gets In	Influx Press	Longlist	
2019	Sally Rooney	Normal People	Faber & Faber	Longlist	
2019	Emma Glass	Peach	Bloomsbury Publishing	Longlist	
2019	Richard Scott	Soho	Faber & Faber	Longlist	
2020	Bryan Washington	Lot	Atlantic Books	Winner	
2020	Mary Jean Chan	Flèche	Faber & Faber	Shortlist	
2020	Stephen Sexton	If All the World and Love Were Young	Penguin Random House	Shortlist	
2020	Téa Obreht	Inland	Weidenfeld & Nicolson	Shortlist	
2020	Ocean Vuong	On Earth We're Briefly Gorgeous	Jonathan Cape / Vintage Books	Shortlist	
2020	Jay Bernard	Surge	Chatto & Windus	Shortlist	
2020	Helen Mort	Black Car Burning	Chatto & Windus	Longlist	
2020	Meena Kandasamy	Exquisite Cadavers	Atlantic Books	Longlist	
2020	Yara Rodrigues Fowler	Stubborn Archivist	Fleet Publishing / Little, Brown and Company	Longlist	
2020	Madhuri Vijay	The Far Field	Atlantic Books	Longlist	
2020	Kirsty Logan	Things We Say in the Dark	Harvill Secker / Vintage Books	Longlist	
2020	Yelena Moskovich	Virtuoso	Serpent's Tail	Longlist	
2021	Raven Leilani	Luster	Picador / Farrar, Straus and Giroux	Winner	
2021	Dima Alzayat	Alligator and Other Stories	Picador / Farrar, Straus and Giroux	Shortlist	
2021	Rye Curtis	Kingdomtide	Fourth Estate / HarperCollins	Shortlist	
2021	Kate Elizabeth Russell	My Dark Vanessa	Fourth Estate / HarperCollins	Shortlist	
2021	Catherine Lacey	Pew	Granta	Shortlist	
2021	Akwaeke Emezi	The Death of Vivek Oji	Faber & Faber	Shortlist	
2021	Romalyn Ante	Antiemetic for Homesickness	Chatto & Windus	Longlist	
2021	Naoise Dolan	Exciting Times	Weidenfeld & Nicolson	Longlist	
2021	Frances Cha	If I Had Your Face	Viking / Penguin Random House	Longlist	
2021	Will Harris	Rendang	Granta	Longlist	
2021	Caoilinn Hughes	The Wild Laughter	Oneworld Publications	Longlist	
2021	Gabriel Krauze	Who They Was	Fourth Estate / HarperCollins	Longlist	
2022	Patricia Lockwood	No One Is Talking About This	Bloomsbury Publishing	Winner	
2022	Caleb Azumah Nelson	Open Water	Viking Press	Shortlist	
2022	Nathan Harris	The Sweetness of Water	Tinder Press / Headline Publishing Group	Shortlist	
2022	Brandon Taylor	Filthy Animals	Daunt Books Publishing	Shortlist	
2022	Nidhi Zak/Aria Eipe	Auguries of a Minor God	Faber & Faber	Shortlist	
2022	Anuk Arudpragasam	A Passage North	Granta	Longlist	
2022	Megan Nolan	Acts of Desperation	Jonathan Cape	Longlist	
2022	Fiona Mozley	Hot Stew	John Murray Press	Longlist	
2022	Tice Cin	Keeping the House	And Other Stories	Longlist	
2022	Dantiel W. Moniz	Milk Blood Heat	Atlantic Books	Longlist	
2022	Helen Oyeyemi	Peaces	Faber & Faber	Longlist	
2022	Desiree Bailey	What Noise Against the Cane	Yale University Press	Longlist	
2023	Arinze Ifeakandu	God's Children Are Little Broken Things		Winner	
2023	Warsan Shire	Bless the Daughter Raised by a Voice in Her Head		Shortlist	
2023	Sheena Patel	I'm a Fan		Shortlist	
2023	Saba Sams	Send Nudes		Shortlist	
2023	Sara Baume	Seven Steeples		Shortlist	
2023	Robbie Arnott	Limberlost		Shortlist	
2024	Caleb Azumah Nelson	Small Worlds		Winner	
2024	Ayọ̀bámi Adébáyọ̀	A Spell of Good Things		Shortlist	
2024	A. K. Blakemore	The Glutton		Shortlist	
2024	Mary Jean Chan	Bright Fear		Shortlist	
2024	Joshua Jones	Local Fires		Shortlist	
2024	Catherine Lacey	Biography of X		Shortlist	
2025	Yasmin Zaher	The Coin		Winner	
2025	Seán Hewitt	Rapture's Road	—	Shortlist	
2025	Ferdia Lennon	Glorious Exploits	—	Shortlist	
2025	Yael van der Wouden	The Safekeep	—	Shortlist	
2025	Rebecca Watson	I Will Crash	—	Shortlist	
2025	Eley Williams	Moderate to Poor, Occasionally Good	—	Shortlist	
2026	Sasha Debevec-McKenney	Joy is My Middle Name	Fitzcarraldo Editions	Winner	
2026	Harriet Armstrong	To Rest Our Minds and Bodies	Les Fugitives	Shortlist	
2026	Colwill Brown	We Pretty Pieces of Flesh	Chatto & Windus	Shortlist	
2026	Suzannah V. Evans	Under the Blue	Bloomsbury Publishing	Shortlist	
2026	Seán Hewitt	Open, Heaven	Jonathan Cape	Shortlist	
2026	Derek Owusu	Borderline Fiction	Canongate Books	Shortlist	
