= Kayo Chingonyi =

Zambian-British poet and editor (born 1987)

Kayo Chingonyi FRSL
- Born: 1987 (age 38–39); Zambia
- Education: University of Sheffield; Royal Holloway, University of London
- Occupations: Poet and editor
- Notable work: Kumukanda (2017)
- Awards: Dylan Thomas Prize; Somerset Maugham Award

Kayo Chingonyi FRSL (born 1987) is a Zambian British poet and editor who is the author of two poetry collections, Kumukanda and A Blood Condition (2021). He has also published two earlier pamphlets, Some Bright Elegance (Salt Publishing, 2012) and The Colour of James Brown’s Scream (Akashic, 2016).

He is a writer and presenter for the music and culture podcast Decode. Chingonyi has won the Geoffrey Dearmer Prize, Dylan Thomas Prize and Somerset Maugham Award. He was elected as a Fellow of the Royal Society of Literature in 2022.

== Biography ==
Chingonyi was born in Zambia in 1987 and moved to the UK at the age of six. He has a BA degree in English literature from the University of Sheffield and an MA in creative writing from Royal Holloway, University of London. Chinyongi was in the first generation of The Complete Works mentoring programme.

== Writing ==
Chingonyi's collection, Kumukanda (Vintage Publishing, 2017) won the Dylan Thomas Prize and a Somerset Maugham Award. Kumukanda was also shortlisted for the Costa Poetry Prize and the Seamus Heaney Centre First Poetry Collection Prize, the Ted Hughes Award for New Work in Poetry, the Roehampton Poetry Prize and the Jhalak Prize. His second collection, A Blood Condition, was published in 2021 by Vintage Publishing.

Chingonyi's work has been published in several anthologies, including The Best British Poetry, The Emma Press Anthology of Aunts, The Emma Press Anthology of Political Poems, Out of Bounds: British Black & Asian Poetry, and Ten: The New Wave. His essays, poems and reviews have been featured in online and print publications. He won a Geoffrey Dearmer Prize in 2012. In 2015, he was Associate Poet at the Institute of Contemporary Arts. Chingonyi was a Burgess Fellow at the Centre for New Writing, University of Manchester. He then went on to be assistant professor of creative writing at Durham University.

He is the founding editor of The Poetics of Grime, poetry editor for The White Review and has edited issues of Magma Poetry and Poetry Review.

Chingonyi was mentored on The Complete Works poets of colour mentoring scheme initiated by Bernardine Evaristo to redress representational invisibility. The scheme (2007–2017) was directed by Dr Nathalie Teitler, during which time thirty poets were mentored.

== Awards and honours ==
=== Literary awards ===
Year	Title	Award	Category	Result	Ref
2012	—	Geoffrey Dearmer Prize	—	Won	
2017	Kumukanda	Costa Book Award	Poetry	Shortlisted	
2017	Kumukanda	Ted Hughes Award	—	Shortlisted	
2018	Kumukanda	Dylan Thomas Prize	—	Won	
2018	Kumukanda	Jhalak Prize	—	Shortlisted	
2018	Kumukanda	Roehampton Poetry Prize	—	Shortlisted	
2018	Kumukanda	Seamus Heaney Centre First Poetry Collection Prize	—	Shortlisted	
2018	Kumukanda	Somerset Maugham Award	—	Won	

=== Honours ===
- 2022: Elected a Fellow of the Royal Society of Literature

== Biblio ==
- —— (2012). Some Bright Elegance (Poetry Pamphlet ed.). Salt Publishing. ISBN 9781844718726.
- —— (2016). The Colour of James Brown's Scream (Poetry Pamphlet ed.). Akashic Books.
- —— (2017). Kumukanda (paperback ed.). London: Chatto & Windus. ISBN 9781784741396.
- —— (2021). A Blood Condition (paperback ed.). London: Chatto & Windus. ISBN 9781784743901.
- —— (2022). More Fiya: A New Collection of Black British Poetry (paperback ed.). Edinburgh: Canongate Books. ISBN 9781838855321.
