= Three Poems =

2018 poetry collection by Hannah Sullivan

- First edition
- Author: Hannah Sullivan
- Language: English
- Genre: Poetry Collection
- Publisher: Faber & Faber
- Publication date: 18 January 2018
- Publication place: England
- Pages: 73
- ISBN: 978-0-571-33767-5

Three Poems is a poetry collection written by British writer Hannah Sullivan and published by Faber & Faber in 2018. The book has since been re-published by Farrar, Straus and Giroux, an imprint of Macmillan Publishers. This is Sullivan's first book of poetry, and it won the T. S. Eliot Prize (2018) for the best new poetry collection published in Great Britain or Ireland. Sullivan wrote short poems until she attended a poetry workshop taught by Jorie Graham; this is her first published long poem. When working on Three Poems, she started out writing fragments before deciding for sure what she wanted to write about.

== Content ==
=== "You, Very Young in New York" ===
The first poem, "You, Very Young in New York", depicts a young woman's recollections of everyday encounters in New York. While she is on her own for the first time, she is longing for adventure but it seems to be happening to someone else. Sullivan describes an indulgence where the young woman feel incomplete unless she can learn to fit into her surrounding environment. This sense of yearning is conveyed in the opening:

Rosy used to say that New York was a fairground.
‘You will know when it’s time, when the fair is over.’
But nothing seems to happen. You stand around
On the same street corners, smoking, thin-elbowed,
Looking down avenues in a lime-green dress
With one arm raised, waiting to get older.
Nothing happens.

=== "Repeat Until Time: The Heraclitus Poem" ===
The second poem is separated into numbered sections. Sullivan uses this poem to reference films, pop culture, and technology. Sullivan describes the same woman moving to California. From San Francisco to the British town of Rye, she discovers an environment marked by repetition. The people around her have a specific routine that they stick by. Sullivan theorizes the impossibility of originality:

There is saying something the same thing in a different form,
There is saying something new in the same form,
There is saying the same thing again in the same form
There is not much saying something new in a new form

=== "The Sandpit After Rain" ===
The last poem describes life and death, and it notes how they are similar. More specifically, the young woman deals with pregnancy, the death of her father, and the birth of her first child. Sullivan states in the acknowledgments that this poem is in memory of her father, John O'Sullivan (1950–2014)

The baby did not look like my father at all,
But there was a resemblance:
Our slight awkwardness with each other

== Style ==
Sullivan uses many styles of writing including couplets, terza rima and free verse. The first poem consists of rhymes and half rhymes, but the poem in a whole is very versatile in style. While the collection has a number of rhymes and short lines, there is not a set style that used throughout. Sullivan told the Los Angeles Review of Books that, while she was brainstorming, she thought to herself, “Maybe I’ll try and write something in rhyming couplets.” She said, "Once you start writing in rhyming couplets, a different tone of voice comes in".

== Criticism ==
Roger Cox from The Scotsman stated, "The opening section of the first of these poems, 'You, Very Young in New York', is one of the most aesthetically pleasing things I have read in a long time".

Lavinia Greenlaw from London Review of Books stated, "Three Poems has an aerated extravagance that brings to mind Wallace Stevens’s ‘Parfait Martinique: coffee mousse, rum on top, a little cream on top of that".

Paul Batchelor, in a review in New Statesman, described the collection as "a richly rewarding collection that shows all the confidence and skill of a poet writing in their prime".
