= Clare Shaw =

British poet

- Born: 30 December 1972 (age 53); Burnley, Lancashire, England
- Occupation: Poet
- Writing career
- Genre: Poetry
- Subjects: Ecopoetry, self-harm, neurodiversity, relationships, human psychology

Clare Elaine Shaw (born 30 December 1972) is a British poet, author, educator, disability advocate, and environmental activist. They are the author of four poetry collections published by Bloodaxe Books: Straight Ahead (2006), Head On (2012), Flood (2018), and Towards a General Theory of Love (2022), and co-editor of The Book of Bogs (2025) published by Little Toller Books and Bluemoose Books.

== Early life and education ==
Shaw was born in Burnley, Lancashire on 30 December 1972, the youngest of six. They attended St Hilda's Roman Catholic School and the University of Liverpool.

== Career ==
Prior to publication, Shaw was a regular guest poet at Carol Ann Duffy and Friends at the Manchester Royal Exchange. They were awarded the Arvon Foundation Jerwood Young Poets' Award in 2002, and mentored by George Szirtes as part of this scheme.

Their first book, Straight Ahead, was published in 2006. One reviewer noted the emergence of a 'raw, new poetic voice,' but called for better editing. An in-depth article in Magma Poetry analysed a poem from this collection alongside other breakup poems that metaphorically explore relationships as living and dying bodies.

Shaw's second collection, Head On, was published in 2012.

Their third collection, Flood (2018), includes poems about the 2015–16 Great Britain and Ireland floods, which destroyed Shaw's adopted home of Hebden Bridge. With poems like 'Catastrophic Devastation; Damage Complete', Shaw became part of a growing ecopoetry movement. The collection also touches upon child abuse and sexual abuse framed through folk tales, and upon survival, whether in psychiatric wards or relationships. Here, the floods are often used as metaphors.

Shaw's fourth collection, Towards a General Theory of Love (2022) was a Poetry Society Book of the Year as nominated by Carole Bromley. In this collection, Shaw continues their exploration of themes of neurodiversity and human psychology. The title of the collection references the well-known book on human emotions, A General Theory of Love, and unusually for a poetry collection, the book has been reviewed in scholarly psychology journals. One reviewer praises Shaw's use of Harry Harlow's study of attachment in baby monkeys, which is woven into many of the poems in the collection, "viscerally conjuring up the larger-than-life character of Monkey, who is the subject and/or narrator of many of the poems."

Their fifth collection, I Saw What I Know, is forthcoming on 24 June 2027, also with Bloodaxe Books.

With writer and teacher Anna Chilvers, Shaw edited The Book of Bogs, an anthology on climate change and the rewilding of wetlands, published in September 2025 by Little Toller Books and Bluemoose Books. Both writers share their passion for bogs and ecology by collaborating on Writing Bogwise, a series of writing workshops focusing on the unique ecology of peatlands and how this can influence writing practice. In addition, the two writers co-author a Substack blog which explores this subject.

Additionally, Shaw co-authors a Substack with the poet Kim Moore entitled Shaw & Moore, which features content including 'poetry, essays, writing tips and exercises', as well as privileged information on the poetry industry in the United Kingdom. On a yearly basis, the two poets – who are also close friends – run January Writing Hours, an extremely popular and well-attended workshop series that centres around generative writing prompts, with 'the emphasis on creating new work, and writing in company'.

== Awards and recognition ==
Shaw has won and been nominated for prizes including the Forward Prize for Best Single Poem and a Northern Writer's Award. Their work has been set to music, illustrated and staged. They wrote the libretto for community opera Daylighting, which premiered at the Royal Academy of Music and won an Ivor Novello Award for Community and Engagement. Their work has also been broadcast on BBC Radio 4's The Verb and Poetry Please.

In 2021, they were appointed Carbon Landscape Poet in Residence by Manchester Literature Festival and Lancashire Wildlife Trust, and commissioned to write poems connected to the landscape. Shaw judged the Manchester Poetry Prize in 2023, the Winchester Poetry Prize in 2024, and the Ted Hughes Award in 2019. Shaw was co-director of the Kendal Poetry Festival from 2019 to 2022, and founder of the Wonky Animals poetry collective and the Lost Things Project. They tutor at the Arvon Foundation.

== Activism and advocacy ==
Shaw is a mental health advocate having published resources on mental health and worked to deliver training, through their own business and through organisations including London-based homeless charity St Mungo's. They also advocate for accessibility in writing, working with the Royal Literary Fund to deliver literacy training. They work in schools as a visiting tutor for organisations including Wordsworth Grasmere, and with members of the wider community, including asylum seekers.

In more recent years, Shaw has turned their attention to climate activism. They are a leading campaigner with activist group 'the Boggarts', part of the Stop Calderdale Wind Farm Coalition, who oppose the proposed development of 'the Calderdale Energy Park', a windfarm to be built on Walshaw Moor. Shaw is committed to protesting against the controversial development, arranging petitions, leading community creative writing workshops to raise local awareness and highlight residents' attachment to the moors, and leading a 'Mass Wuther' (a community event that involved dancing to Kate Bush's famous song Wuthering Heights (song) by way of protest).

Shaw is a passionate voice on synthesising writing with climate activism, having been appointed Carbon Landscape Poet by Manchester Literature Festival and Lancashire Wildlife Trust in 2021. Similarly to their Writing Bogwise course, they also co-facilitate and teach on Wild Writing June, alongside poet and nature writer Miriam Darlington, an annual series of daily generative writing workshops on subjects such as rewilding, urban wilderness, and connections between neurodivergence and queerness and nature.

== Personal life ==
Shaw is non-binary and neurodivergent. They live in Hebden Bridge, West Yorkshire. Their hobbies – which are widely referenced across their social media pages and blogs – include mudlarking, hiking, and spotting wildlife.

== Bibliography ==
=== Poetry collections ===
- Straight Ahead. (Bloodaxe Books, 2006).
- Head On (Bloodaxe Books, 2012).
- Flood (Bloodaxe Books, 2018).
- Towards a General Theory of Love (Bloodaxe Books, 2022)
- I Saw What I Know (Bloodaxe Books, 2027).

=== Anthologies and collaborative works ===
Shaw's writing features in the following publications.

- Out of Fashion: An Anthology of Poems, ed. Carol Ann Duffy (Faber & Faber, 2005). ISBN 978-0-571-21994-0
- Forward Prize Book of Poetry 2007 (Faber & Faber, 2006). ISBN 978-0-571-23448-6
- A Twist of Malice: Uncomfortable Poems by Older Women, ed. Joy Howard (Grey Hen Press, 2008). ISBN 978-1-64547-237-7
- Jubilee Lines: 60 Poets for 60 Years, ed. Carol Ann Duffy (Faber & Faber, 2012). ISBN 978-0-571-27705-6
- Seeing Poetry, with illustrator Louise Crosby
- Twenty Poems to Bless Your Marriage: And One to Save It, ed. Roger Housdon (Shambhala Publications Inc, 2012). ISBN 978-1-64547-237-7
- Project Boast, ed. Rachel Bentham, Alyson Hallett (Triarchy Press, 2018). ISBN 978-1-911193-41-8
- When All This is Over, ed. Bob Horne (Calder Valley Poetry, 2020). ISBN 979-8-5189-0677-8
- We Are the Change-Makers: Poems Supporting Drop The Disorder!, ed. Jo Watson (PCCS Books, 2020). ISBN 978-1-910919-64-4
- 100 Queer Poems, ed. Mary Jean Chan, Andrew McMillan (Vintage Books, 2022).
- The Meeting: Reading and Writing Through John Clare, ed. Simon Kövesi (John Clare Society, 2022). ISBN 978-1-9161355-2-9
- The National Trust Book of Nature Poems, ed. Deborah Alma, (National Trust Books, 2023). ISBN 978-0-00-859602-6
- Ten Poems for a Wedding, ed. Kathryn Bevis (Candlestick Press, 2023). ISBN 978-1-913627-23-2
- Festival in a Book: A Celebration of Wenlock Poetry Festival, ed. Lisa Lefroy (904 Press, 2023). ISBN 978-1-7393787-0-7
- The Book of Bogs, ed. Clare Shaw, Anna Chilvers (Little Toller and Bluemoose Books, 2025)

=== Literary criticism and pedagogy ===
Shaw's writing features in the following publications.

- Writing Your Self, ed. John Killick, Myra Schneider (Bloomsbury Publishing, 2009). ISBN 978-1-84706-251-2
- In Their Own Words: Contemporary Poets on Their Poetry, ed. George Szirtes and Helen Ivory (Salt Publishing, 2012). ISBN 978-1-907773-21-1
- Why I Write Poetry, ed. Ian Humphreys (Nine Arches Press, 2012). ISBN 978-1-913437-29-9
- Poetry Projects to Make and Do, ed. Deborah Alma (Nine Arches Press, 2023). ISBN 978-1-913437-62-6

=== On mental health: books and resources ===
Shaw's writing features in the following publications.

- Encountering Feminism: Intersections Between Feminism and the Person-Centred Approach, ed. Gillian Proctor, Mary Beth Napier (PCCS Books, 2004). ISBN 978-1-898059-65-3
- New Approaches to Preventing Suicide: A Manual for Practitioners, ed. David Duffy, Tony Ryan (Jessica Kingsley Publishers, 2004). ISBN 978-1-84642-010-8
- Our Encounters with Self-Harm, with Charley Baker, Frank Biley (PCCS Books, 2013). ISBN 978-1-906254-96-4
- Otis Doesn't Scratch, with Tamsin Walker (PCCS Books, 2014). ISBN 978-1-906254-56-8
- Searching for a Rose Garden: Challenging psychiatry, Fostering Mad Studies, ed. Jasna Russo, Angela Sweeney (PCCS Books, 2016). ISBN 978-1-910919-30-9
- Supporting the Mental Health of Children in Care, ed. Jeune Guishard Pine OBE, Gail Coleman-Oluwabusola, Suzanne McCall (Jessica Kingsley Publishers, 2017). ISBN 978-1-78450-172-3
- Drop the Disorder! Challenging the culture of psychiatric diagnosis, ed. Jo Watson (PCCS Books, 2019). ISBN 978-1-910919-46-0
- #MeToo: Counsellors and psychotherapists speak about sexual violence and abuse, ed. Deborah A. Lee, Emma Palmer (PCCS Books, 2020). ISBN 978-1-910919-53-8
- First Steps in Counselling (5th Edition): An Introductory Companion, Pete Sanders, Paula J Williams, Andy Rogers (PCCS Books, 2021) ISBN 978-1-910919-38-5
