= Ecopoetry =

Poetry with an environmental emphasis or message

Ecopoetry is any poetry with a strong ecological or environmental emphasis or message. Many poets and poems in the past have expressed ecological concerns, but only recently has there been an established term to describe them; there is now, in English-speaking poetry, a recognisable subgenre of poetry, termed Ecopoetry, which can, on occasions, form a major strand of a writer's career, preoccupy entire poetry collections, or be the theme of international competitions. There is also a strong implication that Ecopoetry is not to do with traditional nature themes, but has some kind of grounding in the modern, post-industrial environmental crisis.

== History ==
Prior to the term, work embodying what would now instantly be recognised as 'an ecological message' had no agreed banner to fly under, but nevertheless the increasing presence of work having an 'ecopoetic' stance exerted an influence on, and gave impetus to, the subsequent subgenre. Examples of influential texts include: the book Ecopoemas of Nicanor Parra (1982); The White Poem by Jay Ramsay & Carole Bruce (Rivelin Grapheme Press, 1988); Bosco (Hearing Eye, 1999; 2001); and (more recently) Heavy Water: a poem for Chernobyl (Enitharmon Press, 2004). Other early publications include The Green Book of Poetry by Ivo Mosley (1995, Frontier Publishing and Harper San Francisco, 1996 as Earth Poems). This included over three hundred poems from around the world, many translated by Mosley, and helped to define and establish the genre.

One of a number of seminal texts helping to introduce the term into wider, critical use was Ecopoetry: a Critical Introduction edited by J. Scott Bryson (2002). Another example of the burgeoning use of the term at the millennial turn was the journal Ecopoetics, which broadened the term from poetry into poiesis interpreted as making or writing more generally. One of the fundamental premises of Ecopoetics is derived from an ideological perspective that desires the conception of difference or alterity as non-oppositional; we are challenged to view things in relation. This recognises that the writing is itself an extension of an ecosystem, and that the characteristics of the text exist in profound relationship to one another.

== Examples ==
Since then, a spate of poetry anthologies and books has appeared, either employing the word explicitly or using the idea as a guiding principle. Recent instances include Alice Oswald's The Thunder Mutters (2005), Forrest Gander & John Kinsella's Redstart: an Ecological Poetics, and Earth Shattering: Ecopoems, edited by Neil Astley at Bloodaxe Books (2007) which included recognised ecopoets such as Gary Snyder, John Burnside, Mario Petrucci and Alice Oswald. There was also Clare Shaw's Flood (2018).

One of the chief characteristics of Ecopoetry, as defined by James Engelhardt, is that it is connected to the world in a way that implies responsibility: as with other models that explore and assume engagement (Marxism, feminism, etc.), Ecopoetry is "surrounded by questions of ethics". Meanwhile, as a means of describing poetry or poetic projects that embrace the ecological imperative for personal sensitivity and social change, Ecopoetry has been cited by such writers as John Burnside and Mario Petrucci. Indeed, Ecopoetry is now more than a subgenre of poetry that simply takes ecology or the environment as its subject; rather, it has begun to be viewed by some critics and artists as part of a much wider, burgeoning artistic movement that, collectively, serves to challenge and influence the non-sustainable habits of culture, politics, economics, and art itself.

== Bibliography ==
- 'Planting Roots: A Survey of Introductions to Ecopoetry and Ecocriticism' by Caitlin Maling, Cordite Poetry Review.
- 'Ecopoems': term used in title of Earth Shattering: Ecopoems (ed. Neil Astley; Bloodaxe 2007) ISBN 1-85224-774-6.
- Redstart: An Ecological Poetics by Forrest Gander and John Kinsella (University of Iowa Press, 2012) ISBN 978-1-60938-119-6.
- Ecopoetry: a Critical Introduction (ed. J. Scott Bryson; University of Utah Press 2002) ISBN 978-0-87480-701-1.
- The Future of the Past: Ecopoetics by Forrest Gander at The Free Library
- The White Poem by Jay Ramsay and Carole Bruce (Rivelin Grapheme Press, 1988) ISBN 978-0-947612-29-0.
- Bosco by Mario Petrucci (Hearing Eye, 1999; 2001) ISBN 1-870841-77-8.
- Heavy Water: a poem for Chernobyl (Enitharmon Press, 2004) ISBN 1-900564-34-3.
- The Thunder Mutters: 101 Poems About the Planet (ed., Alice Oswald; Faber & Faber, 2005) ISBN 978-0-571-21857-8.
- Intatto. Intact / Ecopoesia. Ecopoetry by Massimo D'Arcangelo, Anne Elvey and Helen Moore (La Vita Felice, 2017) ISBN 978-88-93461-90-0.
- The Language Habitat: an Ecopoetry Manifesto by James Engelhardt (2007).
- Manifesto of Italian ECOPOETRY (2005) by M. Ivana Trevisani Bach Archive link.
- Literary journal: Ecopoetics.
- The Poetry Society's Ecopoetry Study Packs.
- Blue Mars by Kim Stanley Robinson - 1996 - A Bantam Spectra Book - ISBN 0-553-57335-7.
- Ecopoetry by V.I.Postnikov (The Trumpeter, 2001, 17,1) http://trumpeter.athabascau.ca.
- 'Earth Under Attack-Nature's Poetry' by R.S Mallari.
- The Ecopoetry Anthology, coedited by Ann Fisher-Wirth and Laura-Gray Street, Trinity University Press (2013).
- Anthroposphere (The Oxford Climate Review) ; issue 8 (2022); article: Art and Climate Change: Separate Bubbles or Mutual Membrane?; archived here: |archive-date=12 July 2023.
