= Metropolitan agriculture =

Metropolitan agriculture is a concept of how to successfully grow food in an urban environment. It studies the linkage between areas such as sustainability, urbanization, urban agriculture, urban land use policies and agricultural change.

== Description ==
Metropolitan agriculture provides a conceptual framework for analysis of all the systems and processes through which agriculture manifests itself in urban areas. This goes beyond primary production to include distribution, processing, marketing and consumption. It can be seen as drawing on urban systems theory to understand the complex ways that agriculture contributes to, shapes, and is shaped by the process of urban development. This requires a spatial lens wider than the immediate urban environment, and the term 'metropolitan' attempts to convey a wider spatial boundary as well as wider conceptual focus.

== TransForum ==
TransForum is a Dutch foundation that works on sustainable agriculture. It has developed several pilot projects centered on re-connecting agriculture and cities while attempting to develop more sustainable agricultural systems and ventures. Out of this work emerged certain underlying characteristics and design principles as well as a larger conceptual framework for understanding the different ways that agriculture plays a part in urban development.

On a project level, TransForum used 'metropolitan agriculture' to convey an emphasis on systems integration in production processes, lowering external inputs by striving towards closed-loop systems, and multi-functionality in agricultural enterprises.

== See also ==
- Urban agriculture
- Sustainable agriculture
