= Urban agriculture =

Farming in cities and urban areas

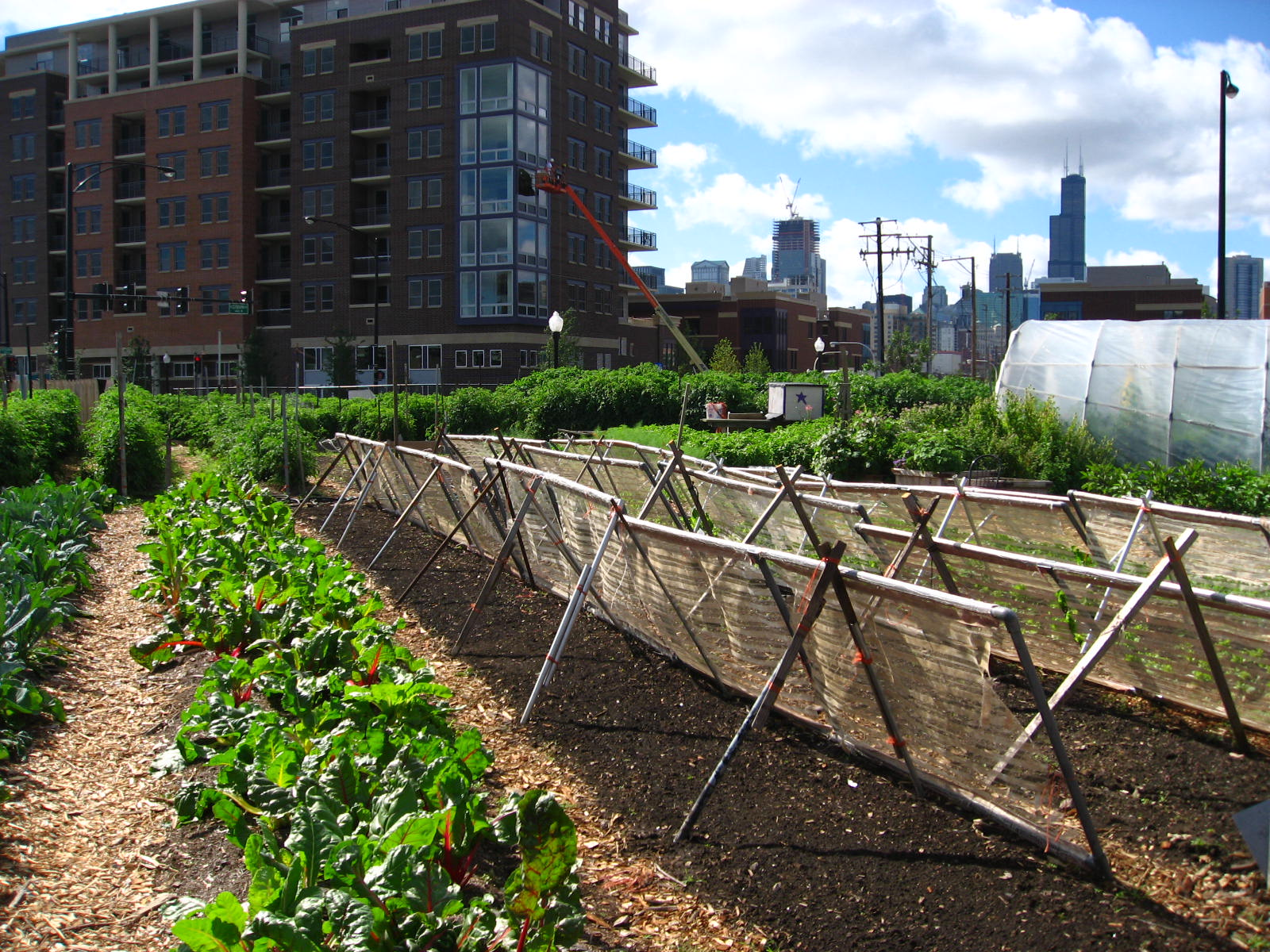
An urban farm in Chicago.

Urban agriculture (UA) refers to various practices of cultivating, processing, and distributing food in urban areas. The term also applies to the area activities of animal husbandry, aquaculture, beekeeping, and horticulture in an urban context. Urban agriculture is distinguished from peri-urban agriculture, which takes place in rural areas at the edge of suburbs. In many urban areas, efforts to expand agriculture also require addressing legacy soil contamination, particularly from lead and other heavy metals, which can pose risks to human health and food safety.

Urban agriculture can appear at varying levels of economic and social development. It can involve a movement of organic growers, "foodies" and "locavores", who seek to form social networks founded on a shared ethos of nature and community holism. These networks can develop by way of formal institutional support, becoming integrated into local town planning as a "transition town" movement for sustainable urban development. For others, food security, nutrition, and income generation are key motivations for the practice. In either case, the more direct access to fresh vegetable, fruit, and meat products that may be realised through urban agriculture can improve food security and food safety while decreasing food miles, leading to lower greenhouse gas emissions, thereby contributing to climate change mitigation.

== History ==
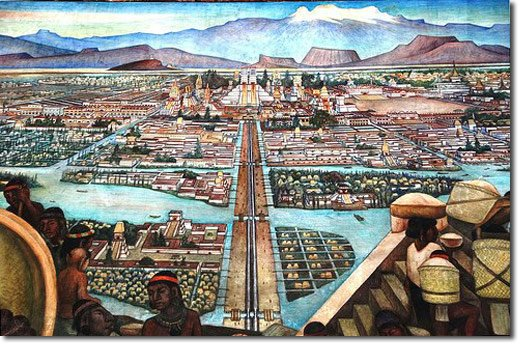
An artist's impression of the Aztec Empire's capital city of Tenochtitlan. Chinampas are prominently featured in the foreground, but visible throughout the city.

Some of the first evidence of urban agriculture comes from early Mesopotamian cultures. Farmers would set aside small plots of land for farming within the city's walls. (3500BC) In Persia's semi-desert towns, oases were fed through aqueducts carrying mountain water to support intensive food production, nurtured by wastes from the communities. The Hanging Gardens of Babylon are another famous - if potentially legendary - regional example. In China, Xi'an has been continuously inhabited since at least 5000 BC, whose citizens have engaged in urban agriculture at varying degrees during different points of its history. At the Incans' Machu Picchu, water was conserved and reused as part of the stepped architecture of the city, and vegetable beds were designed to gather sun in order to prolong the growing season. Elsewhere in the Americas, well-documented examples of pre-Columbian Amerindian urban agriculture include the Aztecs' lake-based chinampas which were crucial to population growth in Mexico Valley's cities; Cahokia's maize-based economy in the Mississippi River near present-day St. Louis; and the thriving mesa agricultural plots of the cliff-based Pueblo cultures such as Mesa Verde of today's Four Corners region, among others.

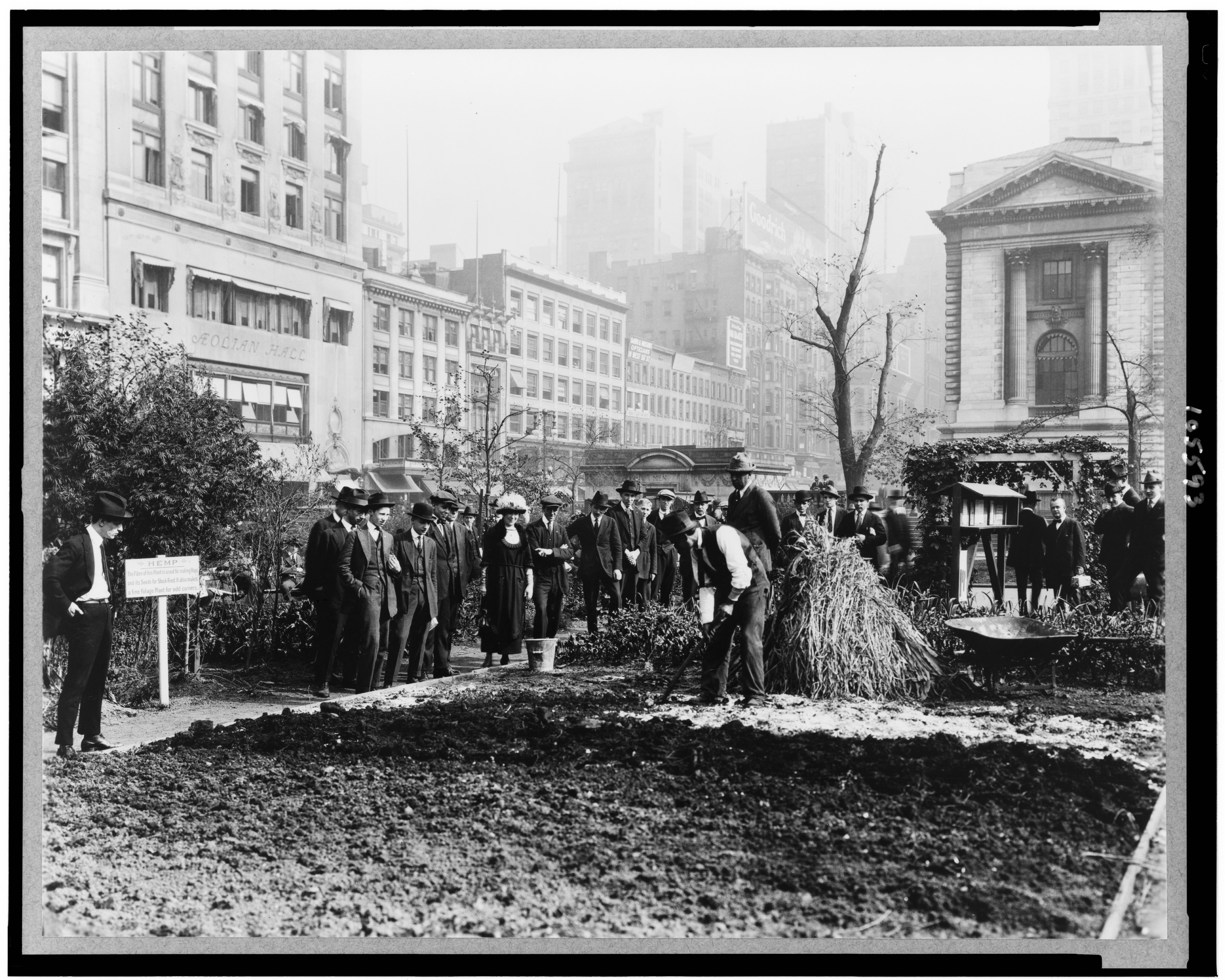
A gardening demonstration in New York City, 1922

The idea of supplemental food production beyond rural farming operations and distant imports is not new. It was used during war and depression times when food shortage issues arose, as well as during times of relative abundance. Allotment gardens emerged in Germany in the early 19th century as a response to poverty and food insecurity.

In the context of the US, urban agriculture as a widely recognized practice took root in response of the 1893–1897 economic depression in Detroit. In 1894, Mayor Hazen S. Pingree called on outlying citizens of a depression-struck Detroit to lend their properties to the city government ahead of the winter season. The Detroit government would in turn develop these lots as makeshift potato gardens - nicknamed Pingree's Potato Patches after the mayor - as potatoes were weather resistant and easy to grow. He intended for these gardens to produce income, food supply, and boost independence during times of hardship. The Detroit project was successful enough that other US cities adopted similar urban agriculture practices. By 1906, the United States Department of Agriculture estimated that over 75,000 schools alone managed urban agriculture programs to provide children and their families with fresh produce. However, it would not be until the First World War that US urban agriculture spread widely.

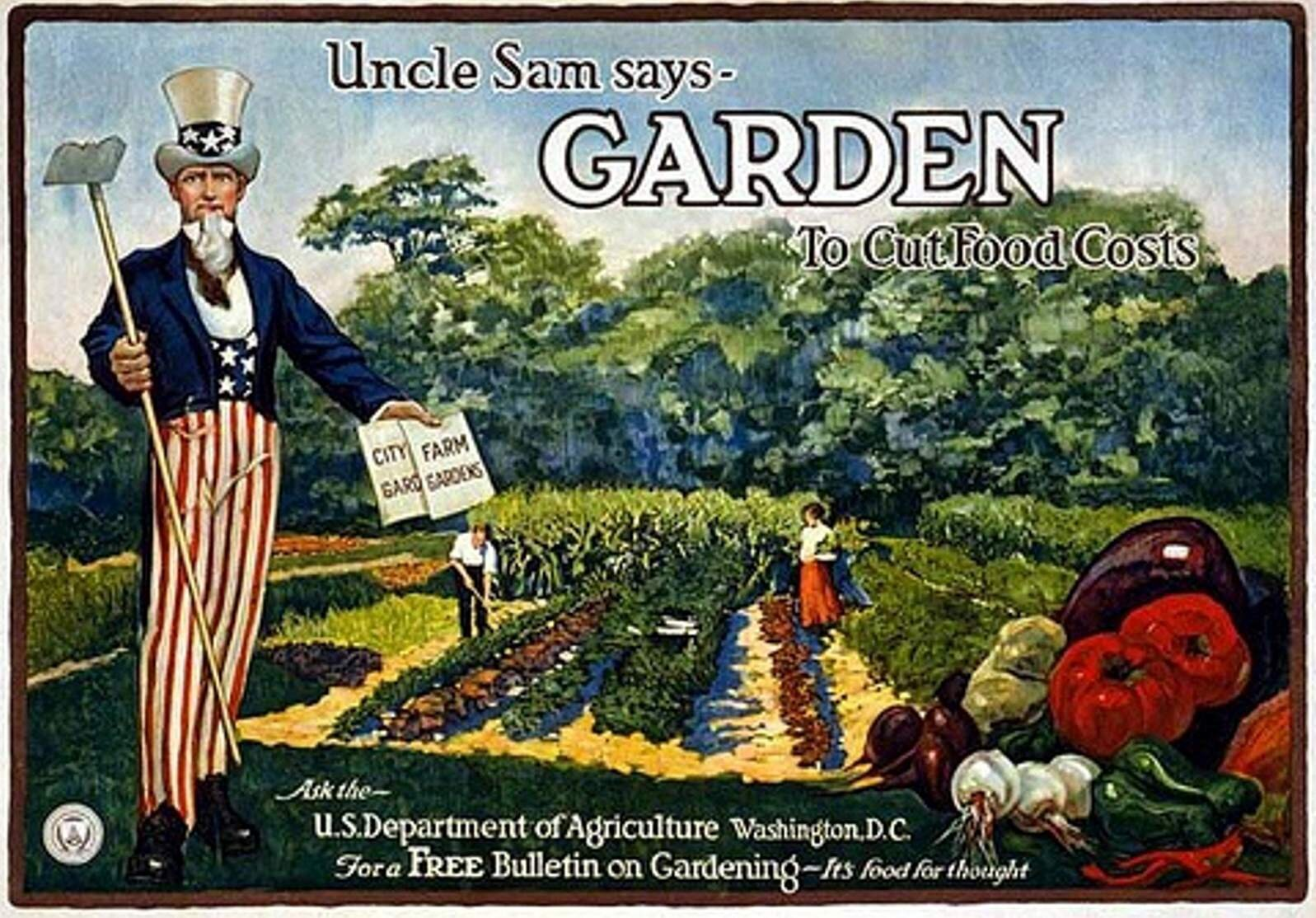
An example of the urban agriculture propaganda deployed by the government of the United States during the world wars. "Uncle Sam" encourages the audience to grow their own food in their own gardens, as both an act of patriotism and explicitly to reduce food costs during war rationing.

During World War One, food production became a major national security concern for several countries, including the US. President Woodrow Wilson called upon all American citizens to utilize any available open food growth, seeing this as a way to pull them out of a potentially damaging situation of food insecurity. The National War Garden Committee under the American Forestry Association organized campaigns with patriotic messages such as "Sow the Seeds of Victory", with the aim of reducing domestic pressure on food production. In so doing, primary agricultural industries could focus on shipping rations to troops in Europe. So called victory gardens sprouted during World War One (emulated later during World War Two) in the US, as well as Canada & the United Kingdom. By 1919, American victory gardens numbered 5 million plots country-wide, and over 500 million pounds of produce was harvested. So efficient were the American urban agriculture programs that surplus foodstuffs were shipped to war-ravaged European nations, in addition to American military forces.

A very similar practice came into use during the Great Depression that provided a purpose, job and food to those who would otherwise be without anything during such harsh times. These efforts helped raise spirits and boost economic growth. Over 2.8 million dollars' worth of food was produced from the subsistence gardens during the Depression. Public and government support for Victory Gardens waned during the Interwar Period, with most American sites becoming repurposed for various economic development initiatives.

By World War II, the War/Food Administration set up a National Victory Garden Program that set out to systematically establish functioning agriculture within cities. Indeed, these new victory gardens became the "first line of defense for the country". Once more, the government supported and encouraged Victory Gardens as a means of national security: domestic pressure on major agricultural industries would be relieved to further augment the war economy. With this new plan in action, as many as 5.5 million Americans took part in the victory garden movement and over nine million pounds of fruit and vegetables were grown a year, accounting for 44% of US-grown produce throughout that time. In the post-war period, the US government gradually stopped assisting urban agriculture programs, partially due to the lack of need of war supplies and partially due to the US fully embracing industrialized food systems.

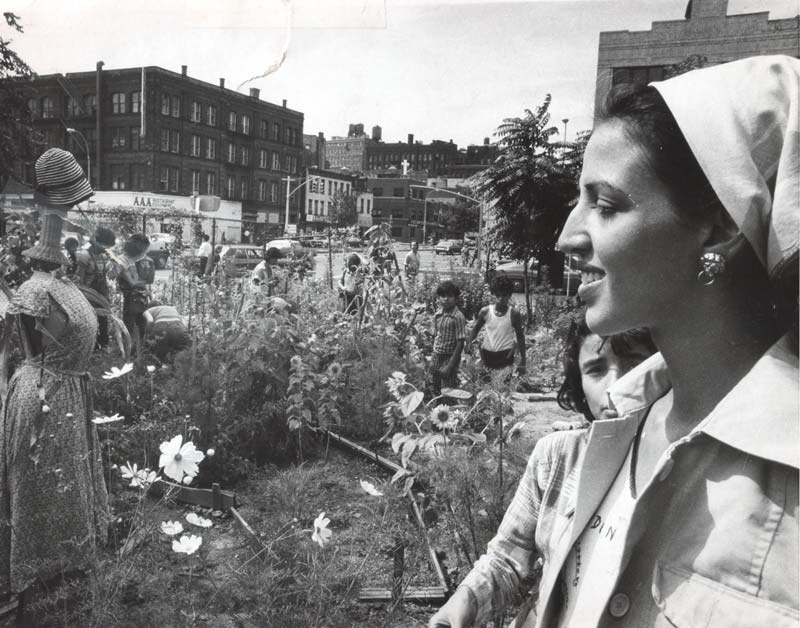
1975 image of Liz Christy in one of her Lower East Side gardens, as one example of NYC's Green Guerillas.

By the 1950s and 1960s, urban agriculture was more focused on grassroots initiatives spearheaded by politicized social movements, including the African-American Civil Rights. These groups benefited from a great number of vacant lots, left behind during a period of post-war urban to suburban migration. Despite these efforts, vacant lots as a whole became seen as blighted, decaying areas. Some American cities, such as Syracuse, NY once more supported urban agriculture programs, not for food security but to make these vacant lots more appealing. Social and environmental justice groups, such as New York City based Green Guerillas, Seattle-based P-Patch, Boston-based Urban Gardeners, and Philadelphia-based Philadelphia Green, continued to shape American urban agricultural practices during the 1970s. These groups - and many others - reinvigorated interest in urban agriculture, aimed not only at community development but also combating environmental crises.

American urban agriculture initiatives during the 1980s built upon the previous decade's focus on community engagement. A natural evolution was sites of urban agriculture entering everyday community roles and consequently requiring more funding than grassroots movements could muster. The US government created an Urban Garden Program, which funded programs in twenty-eight cities who in turn produced roughly twenty-one million dollars of produce. Though some sites of urban agriculture were repurposed for other economic development, the overall trend of the 1980s was an expansion of the practice. The 1990s continued this growth of urban agriculture sites in the US, while also expanding their purposes. A result of this broadening was the division of urban agriculture practitioners based on motivations, organizational structure, and a host of other operational concerns.

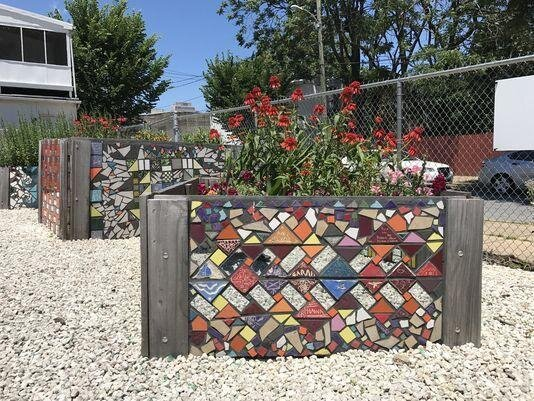
An example of urban agriculture in Wilmington, Delaware. The garden is secondary to the operating organization's wider mission of reducing youth truancy. While crops are grown, flowers have been placed around the perimeter explicitly to attract community members to the garden.

Throughout the 2000s, 2010s, and 2020s, urban agriculture sites and usages of these sites have continued to grow. Groups managing some sites focus on the economic security and cultural preservation of immigrants, such as the Hmong American communities in various US states. Other groups incorporate urban agriculture programs as part of wider social justice missions, such as those in the city of Wilmington, Delaware. Still others seek to use urban agriculture as a means of combating community-scale food insecurity, as part of wider goals of rewilding cities and human diets, among a multitude of other uses. Much attention has been placed on the practice of urban agriculture in connection to food movements such as alternative food networks, sustainable food networks, and local food movements. Alternative food networks seek to redefine food production, distribution, and consumption by considering the sociocultural elements of local communities and economies. Sustainable food networks are a related concept, but focus more on ecological concerns. Local food networks focus more on the political responses to globalization.

== Main types ==
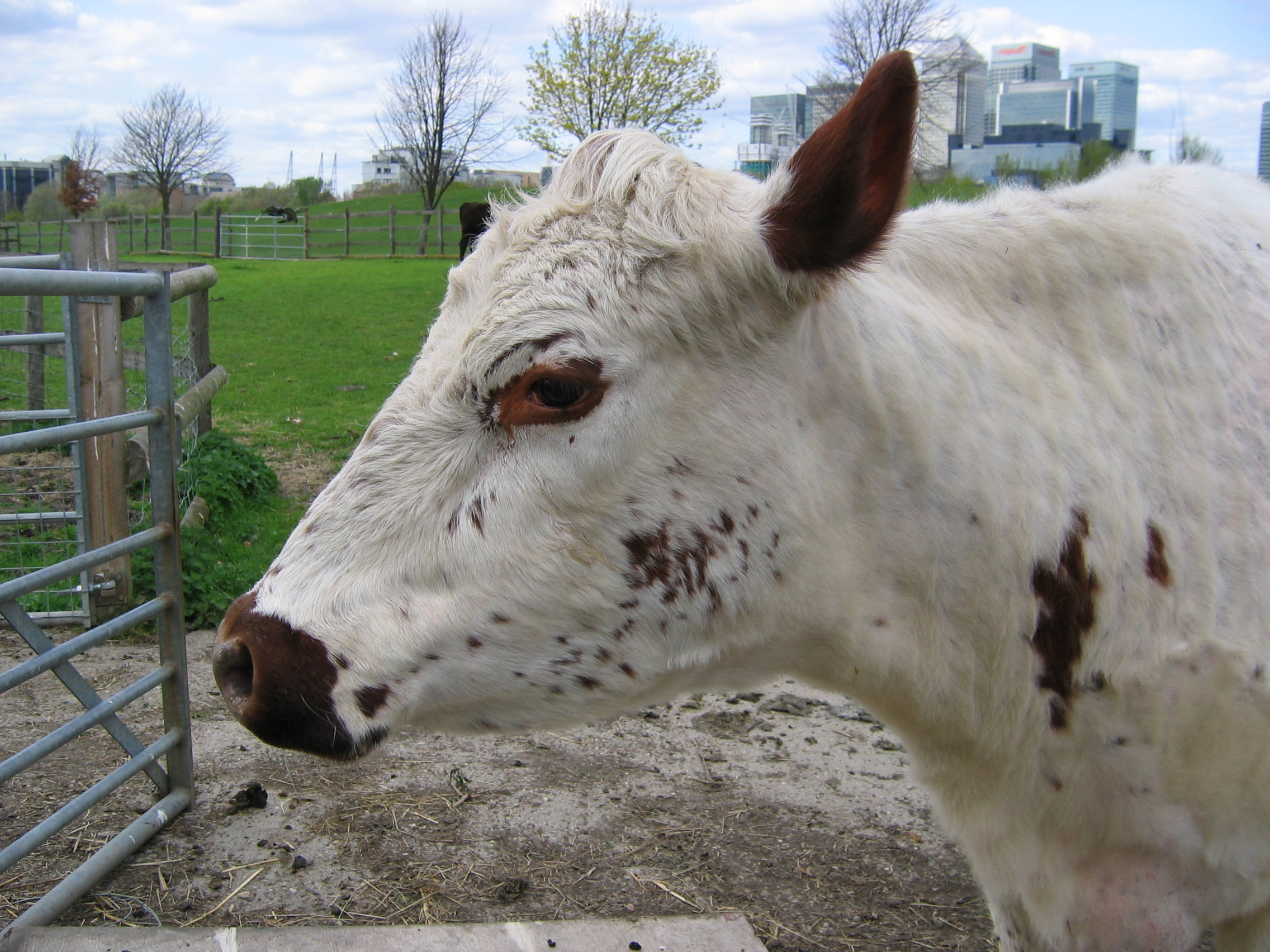
A cow at Mudchute Park and Farm, Tower Hamlets, London. Note Canary Wharf in the background.

There is no overarching term for agricultural plots in urban areas. Gardens and farms, while not easy to define, are the two main types. According to the USDA, a farm is "any place from which $1,000 or more of agricultural products were produced and sold." In Europe, the term "city farm" is used to include gardens and farms. Any plot with produce being grown in it can be considered an urban farm. Size does not matter, it is more about growing produce on your own in your personal plot or garden.

=== Gardens ===
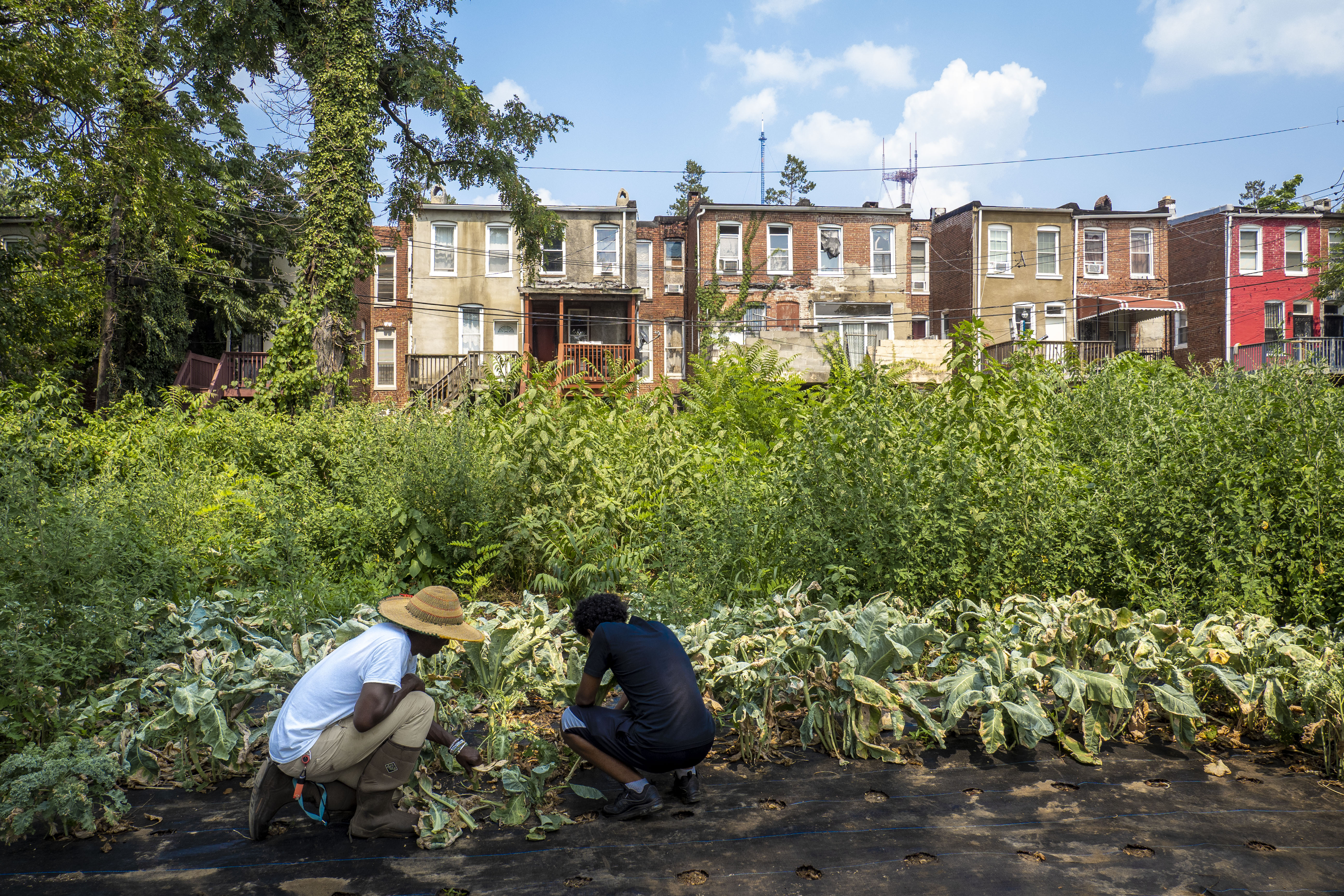
Plantation Park Heights Urban Farm in Baltimore, USA.

Many communities make community gardening accessible to the public, providing space for citizens to cultivate plants for food, recreation and education. In many cities, small plots of land and also rooftops are used for community members to garden. Community gardens give citizens the opportunity to learn about horticulture through trial and error and get a better understanding of the process of producing food and other plants. All while still being able to feed those people in need from the community. It holds as both a learning experience as well as a means of help for those people in need. A community gardening program that is well-established is Seattle's P-Patch. The grassroots permaculture movement has been hugely influential in the renaissance of urban agriculture throughout the world. During the 1960s a number of community gardens were established in the United Kingdom, influenced by the community garden movement in the United States. Bristol's Severn Project was established in 2010 for £2500 and provides 34 tons of produce per year, employing people from disadvantaged backgrounds.

==== School gardens ====
A prominent aspect of gardening is the formation of school gardens. American interest towards school gardens began from the successes and expansion of agricultural education in Europe. Several European regions, such as France, Germany, Sweden, Belgium, and England, had established a strong presence of agricultural learning programs, which led to concerns being raised that suggested America was falling behind in an essential educational development. From the first establishment of a school garden in Roxbury, Massachusetts in the 1890s, the main intention was to expose the youth to agriculture because it was agreed upon by teachers, government agencies, and other prominent social figures that gardening positively contributes to the youth's education, health, and overall civic-mindedness. Considered the Nature Study movement, the implementation of school gardens was promoted to reinforce the connection between the youth and outdoors, promote agrarian values, and provide interactive educational lessons that included science and observations of natural phenomena. Due to the inherent nature of urbanization, cities typically do not have the natural spaces for exploration or outside activities. Without these designated spaces for exposure to nature, urban youth are less likely to connect with, and value, the natural environment in meaningful ways, as well as express environmentally responsible behaviors. As the Detroit movement of revitalizing vacant lots to become urban farms was spreading across the nation, a key approach to urban agriculture was focused on establishing gardens at schools, which have shown to be an effective way to connect youth to nature, as well as the practice of growing food. By 1914, urban farms at schools received an official endorsement as an educational resource in school curriculum by the Federal Bureau of Education's establishment of the Division of Home and School Gardening in 1914.

=== Farms ===
The Project Eats Rooftop Farm in New York City

The first urban agriculture method of growing occurs when family farms maintain their land as the city grows around it. City farms/Urban farms are agricultural plots in urban areas, that have people working with animals and plants to produce food. They are usually community-run gardens seeking to improve community relationships and offer an awareness of agriculture and farming to people who live in urbanized areas. Although the name says urban, urban farming does not have to be in the urban area, it can be in the backyard of a house, or the rooftop of an apartment building. They are important sources of food security for many communities around the globe. City farms vary in size from small plots in private yards to larger farms that occupy a number of acres. In 1996, a United Nations report estimated there are over 800 million people worldwide who grow food and raise livestock in cities. Although some city farms have paid employees, most rely heavily on volunteer labour, and some are run by volunteers alone. Other city farms operate as partnerships with local authorities.

An early city farm was set up in 1972 in Kentish Town, London. It combines farm animals with gardening space, an addition inspired by children's farms in the Netherlands. Other city farms followed across London and the United Kingdom. In Australia, several city farms exist in various capital cities. In Melbourne, the Collingwood Children's Farm was established in 1979 on the Abbotsford Precinct Heritage Farmlands (the APHF), the oldest continually farmed land in Victoria, farmed since 1838.

In 2010, New York City saw the building and opening of the world's largest privately owned and operated rooftop farm, followed by an even larger location in 2012. Both were a result of municipal programs such as The Green Roof Tax Abatement Program and Green Infrastructure Grant Program.

On the island of Taiwan, local city governments sometimes support urban agriculture as a means of sustainable ecology, such as Taipei's Garden City Initiative. Originally intended to be small-scale, the program was met with unanticipated enthusiasm, for example, 200+ schools were approved for its trial phase out of planned 22. While certain challenges exist towards implementation and management, the program covers multiple types of urban agricultural sites governed by a variety of independent actors and institutions.

Like many countries experiencing rapid (urban) population growth, China is exploring urban agriculture as a means of feeding its growing population; such as in Shanghai and the Megalopolis of the Pearl River Delta. Despite several widespread cultural, architectural, economic, governmental, and social challenges towards implementation, urban agriculture is noted as having numerous positive transformative effects for China ranging from local food security to national economic security.

== Perspectives ==
=== Resource and economic ===
The Urban Agriculture Network has defined urban agriculture as:

An industry that produces, processes, and markets food, fuel, and other outputs, largely in response to the daily demand of consumers within a town, city, or metropolis, many types of privately and publicly held land and water bodies were found throughout intra-urban and peri-urban areas. Typically urban agriculture applies intensive production methods, frequently using and reusing natural resources and urban wastes, to yield a diverse array of land-, water-, and air-based fauna and flora contributing to food security, health, livelihood, and environment of the individual, household, and community.

With rising urbanization, food resources in urban areas are less accessible than in rural areas. This disproportionately affects the poorest communities, and the lack of food access and increased risk of malnutrition has been linked to socioeconomic inequities. Economic barriers to food access are linked to capitalist market structures and lead to "socioeconomic inequities in food choices", "less... healthful foods", and phenomena such as food deserts. Additionally, racialized systems of governance of urban poor communities facilitates the increasing prominence of issues such as unemployment, poverty, access to health, educational and social resources, including a community's access to healthy food.

Today, some cities have much vacant land due to urban sprawl and home foreclosures. This land could be used to address food insecurity. One study of Cleveland shows that the city could actually meet up to 100% of its fresh produce need. This would prevent up to $115 million in annual economic leakage. Using the rooftop space of New York City would also be able to provide roughly twice the amount of space necessary to supply New York City with its green vegetable yields. Space could be even better optimized through the usage of hydroponic or indoor factory production of food. Growing gardens within cities would also cut down on the amount of food waste. In order to fund these projects, it would require financial capital in the form of private enterprises or government funding.

=== Environmental ===
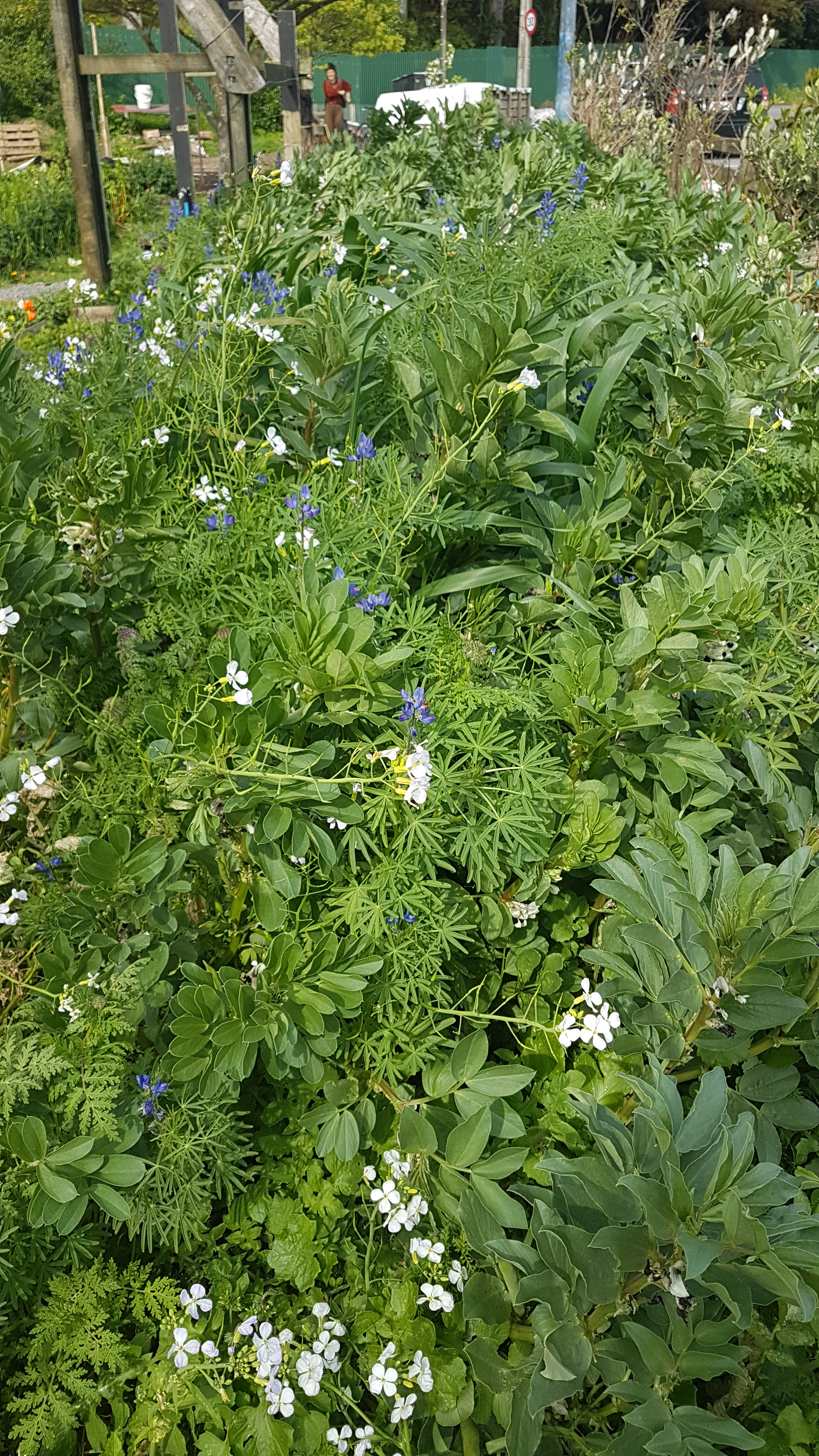
A mixed garden bed of plants for food and for bees and insects in a community based urban farm in New Zealand

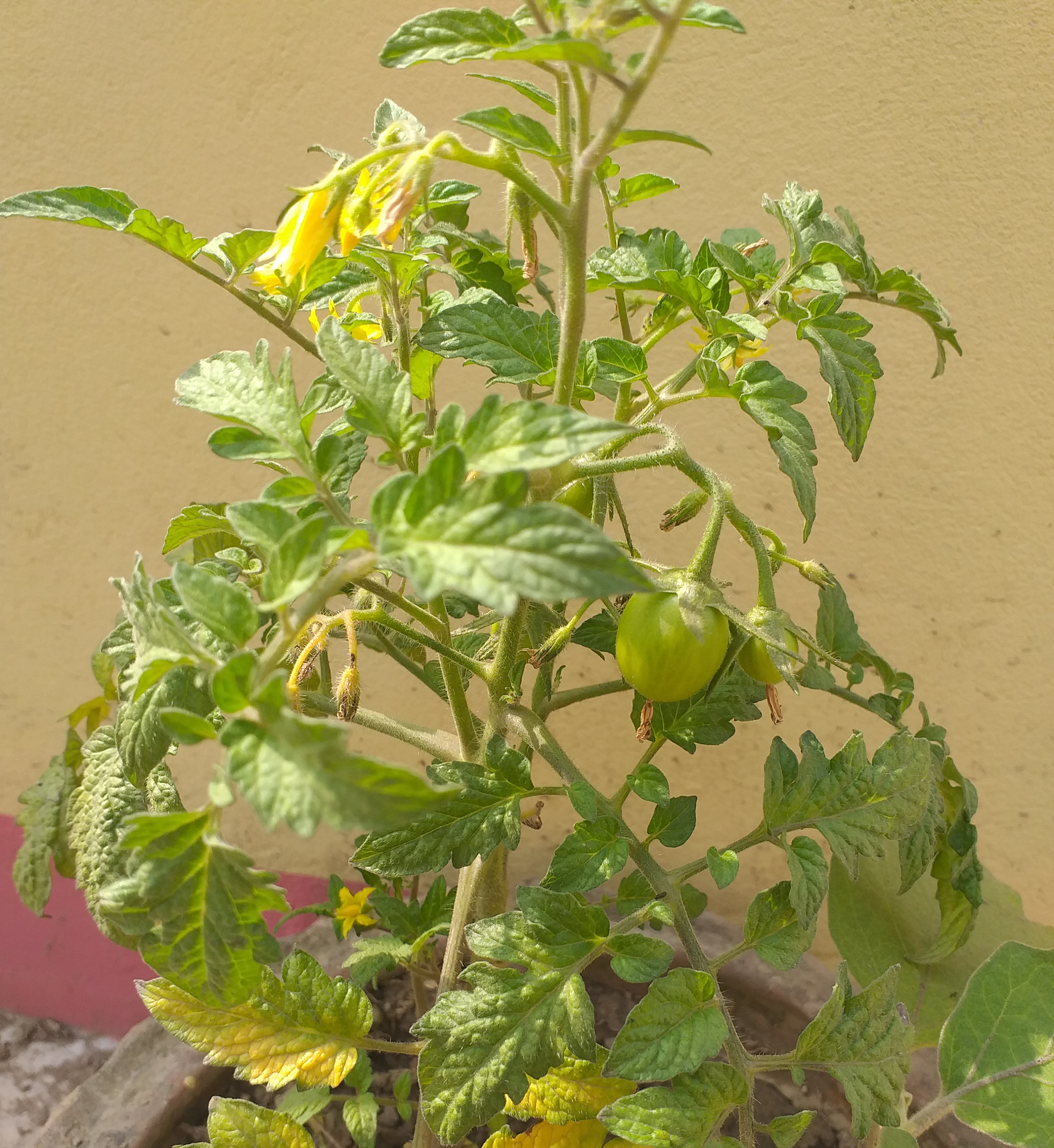
Tomato plant at Roof garden in Mymensingh, Bangladesh

The Council for Agricultural Science and Technology (CAST) defines urban agriculture to include aspects of environmental health, remediation, and recreation:

Urban agriculture is a complex system encompassing a spectrum of interests, from a traditional core of activities associated with the production, processing, marketing, distribution, and consumption, to a multiplicity of other benefits and services that are less widely acknowledged and documented. These include recreation and leisure; economic vitality and business entrepreneurship, individual health and well-being; community health and well-being; landscape beautification; and environmental restoration and remediation.

Modern planning and design initiatives are often more responsive to this model of urban agriculture because they fit within the current scope of sustainable design. The definition allows for a multitude of interpretations across cultures and time. Frequently it is tied to policy decisions to build sustainable cities.

Urban farms also provide unique opportunities for individuals, especially those living in cities, to engage with ecological citizenship actively. By reconnecting with food production and nature, urban community gardening teaches individuals the skills necessary to participate in a democratic society. Decisions must be made on a group-level basis to run the farm. Most effective results are achieved when community residents are asked to take on more active roles in the farm.

While it has been estimated that 20%-30% of urban residents become involved in urban agriculture, its ecological footprint and how it compares to that of conventionally-grown produce has yet to be fully determined. A study by the University of Michigan found that urban agriculture's carbon footprint is six times greater, but some crops, such as tomatoes, have lower carbon intensity when grown in urban plots. There are also a variety of methods used to decrease urban agriculture's negative impacts, most notably using rainwater and composting.

=== Food security ===
Access to nutritious food, both economically and geographically, is another perspective in the effort to locate food and livestock production in cities. The tremendous influx of the world population to urban areas has increased the need for fresh and safe food. The Community Food Security Coalition (CFSC) defines food security as:

All persons in a community having access to culturally acceptable, nutritionally adequate food through local, non-emergency sources at all times.

Areas faced with food security issues have limited choices, often relying on highly processed fast food or convenience store foods that are high in calories and low in nutrients, which may lead to elevated rates of diet-related illnesses such as diabetes. These problems have brought about the concept of food justice which Alkon and Norgaard (2009; 289) explain that, "places access to healthy, affordable, culturally appropriate food in the contexts of institutional racism, racial formation, and racialized geographies... Food justice serves as a theoretical and political bridge between scholarship and activism on sustainable agriculture, food insecurity, and environmental justice."

Some systematic reviews have already explored urban agriculture contribution to food security and other determinants of health outcomes (see)

Urban agriculture is part of a larger discussion of the need for alternative agricultural paradigms to address food insecurity, inaccessibility of fresh foods, and unjust practices on multiple levels of the food system; and this discussion has been led by different actors, including food-insecure individuals, farm workers, educators and academics, policymakers, social movements, organizations, and marginalized people globally.

In Oakland, California, there is a prominent presence of urban agriculture that has been steadily growing with the establishment of urban agriculture regulations that clarified what was permitted and expanded areas where residents could grow crops without needing special permits. Oakland has a history of redlining, and is widely food insecure. With the lack of grocery stores and liquor stores on most corners, it is representative of the disproportionate number of liquor stores in urban communities of color. The surge of urban agriculture in Oakland goes to show the prioritization of community building that is involved. Activism plays a large role in the urban agriculture momentum of Oakland's food systems as food justice organizations focus on providing fresh produce to those with limited access to healthy food while celebrating community-building. Food justice activists draw inspiration from the anti-poverty, environmental justice, and sustainable agriculture movements, to ensure equitable access to healthy food in the poorest communities. Urban agriculture programs centered on food justice integrate nutritional and environmental education with community development, and are supported by the establishment of school gardens and the implementation of youth-centered programs at nearby community farms. Community-based organizations_{,} such as City Slicker Farms, Oakland Food Connection, and Oakland Based Urban Gardens provide residents with fresh produce through community supported agriculture, sliding scale farm stands, or local farmers markets. The Oakland movement is important to see the change in how Americans think about where our food comes from, and how it is processed, distributed, and consumed.

The issue of food security is accompanied by the related movements of food justice and food sovereignty. These movements incorporate urban agriculture in how they address food-resources of a community. Food sovereignty, in addition to promoting food access, also seeks to address the power dynamics and political economy of food; it accounts for the embedded power structures of the food system, ownership of production, and decision-making on multiple levels (i.e. growing, processing, and distribution): Under this framework, representative decision-making and responsiveness to the community are core features.

== Impacts and solutions ==
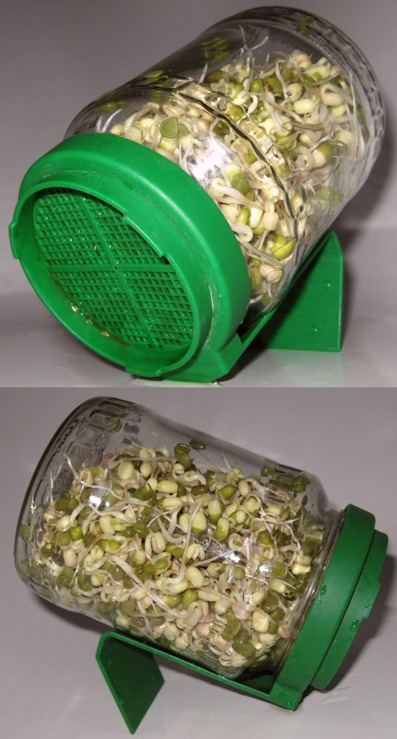
A sprouting glass jar with mung beans in it.

In general, urban and peri-urban agriculture (UPA) contributes to food availability, particularly of fresh produce, provides employment and income and can contribute to the food security and nutrition of urban dwellers.

=== Economic ===
Urban and peri-urban agriculture expands the economic base of the city through production, processing, packaging, and marketing of consumable products. This results in an increase in entrepreneurial activities and the creation of jobs, as well as reducing food costs and improving quality. UPA provides employment, income, and access to food for urban populations, which helps to relieve chronic and emergency food insecurity. Chronic food insecurity refers to less affordable food and growing urban poverty, while emergency food insecurity relates to breakdowns in the chain of food distribution. UPA plays an important role in making food more affordable and in providing emergency supplies of food. Research into market values for produce grown in urban gardens has been attributed to a community garden plot a median yield value of between approximately $200 and $500 (US, adjusted for inflation).

=== Social ===
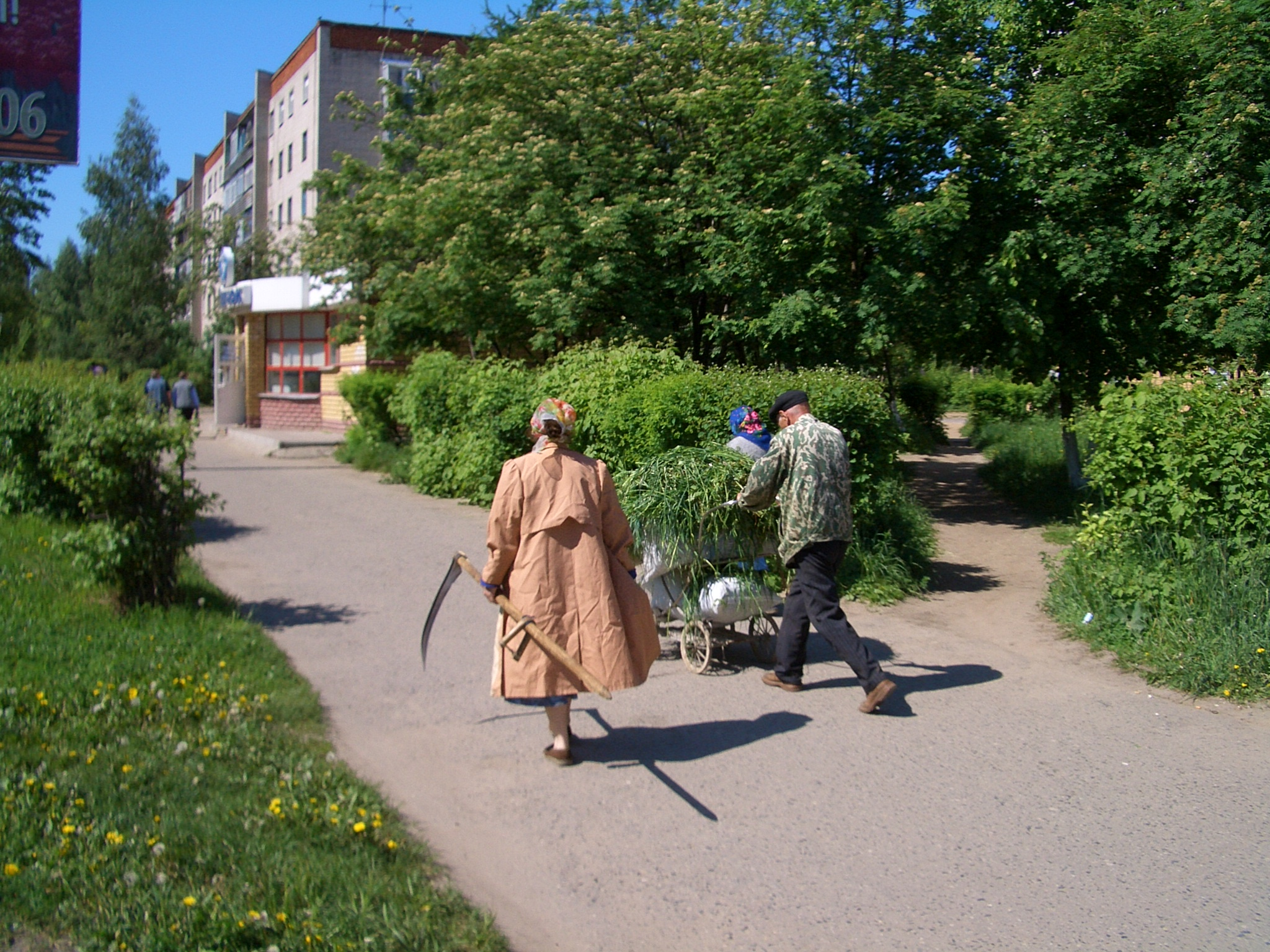
The needs of urban landscaping can be combined with those of suburban livestock farmers. (Kstovo, Russia).

Urban agriculture can have a large impact on the social and emotional well-being of individuals. Many gardens facilitate the improvement of social networks within the communities that they are located. For many neighborhoods, gardens provide a "symbolic focus", which leads to increased neighborhood pride.

When individuals come together around UA, physical activity levels are often increased. This can also raise serotonin levels akin to working out at a gym. There is the added element of walking/biking to the gardens, further increasing physical activity and the benefits of being outdoors.

The ability to produce and grow food for oneself has also been reported to improve levels of self-esteem or of self-efficacy.

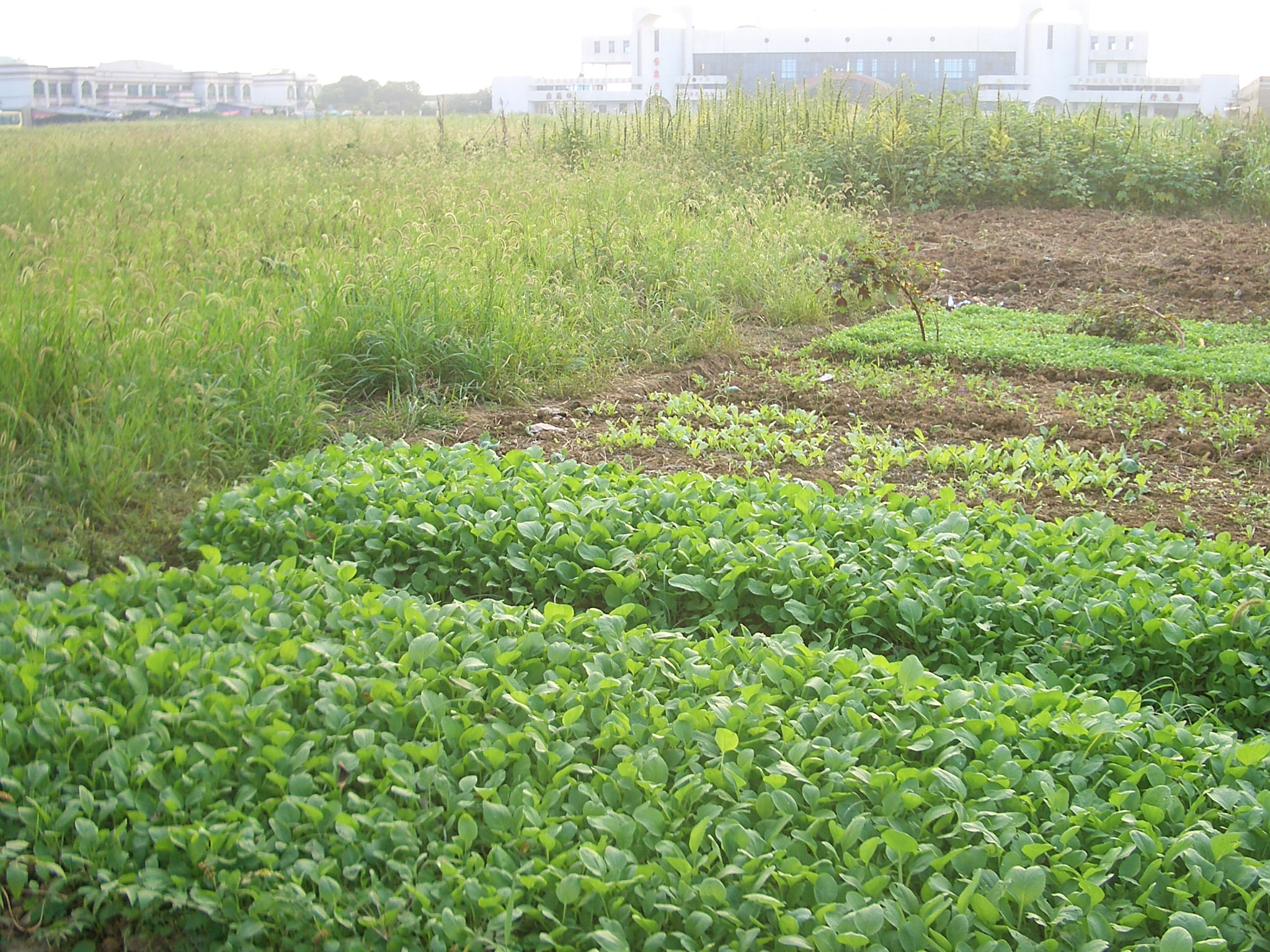
A vegetable garden in the square in front of the train station in Ezhou, China.

Some community urban farms can be quite efficient and help women find work, who in some cases are marginalized from finding employment in the formal economy. Studies have shown that participation from women have a higher production rate, therefore producing the adequate amount for household consumption while supplying more for market sale.

As most UA activities are conducted on vacant municipal land, there have been raising concerns about the allocation of land and property rights. The IDRC and the FAO have published the Guidelines for Municipal Policymaking on Urban Agriculture, and are working with municipal governments to create successful policy measures that can be incorporated in urban planning.

Over a third of US households, roughly 42 million, participate in food gardening. There has also been an increase of 63% participation in farming by millennials from 2008 to 2013. US households participating in community gardening has also tripled from 1 to 3 million in that time frame. Urban agriculture provides unique opportunities to bridge diverse communities together. In addition, it provides opportunities for health care providers to interact with their patients. Thus, making each community garden a hub that is reflective of the community.

=== Energy efficiency ===
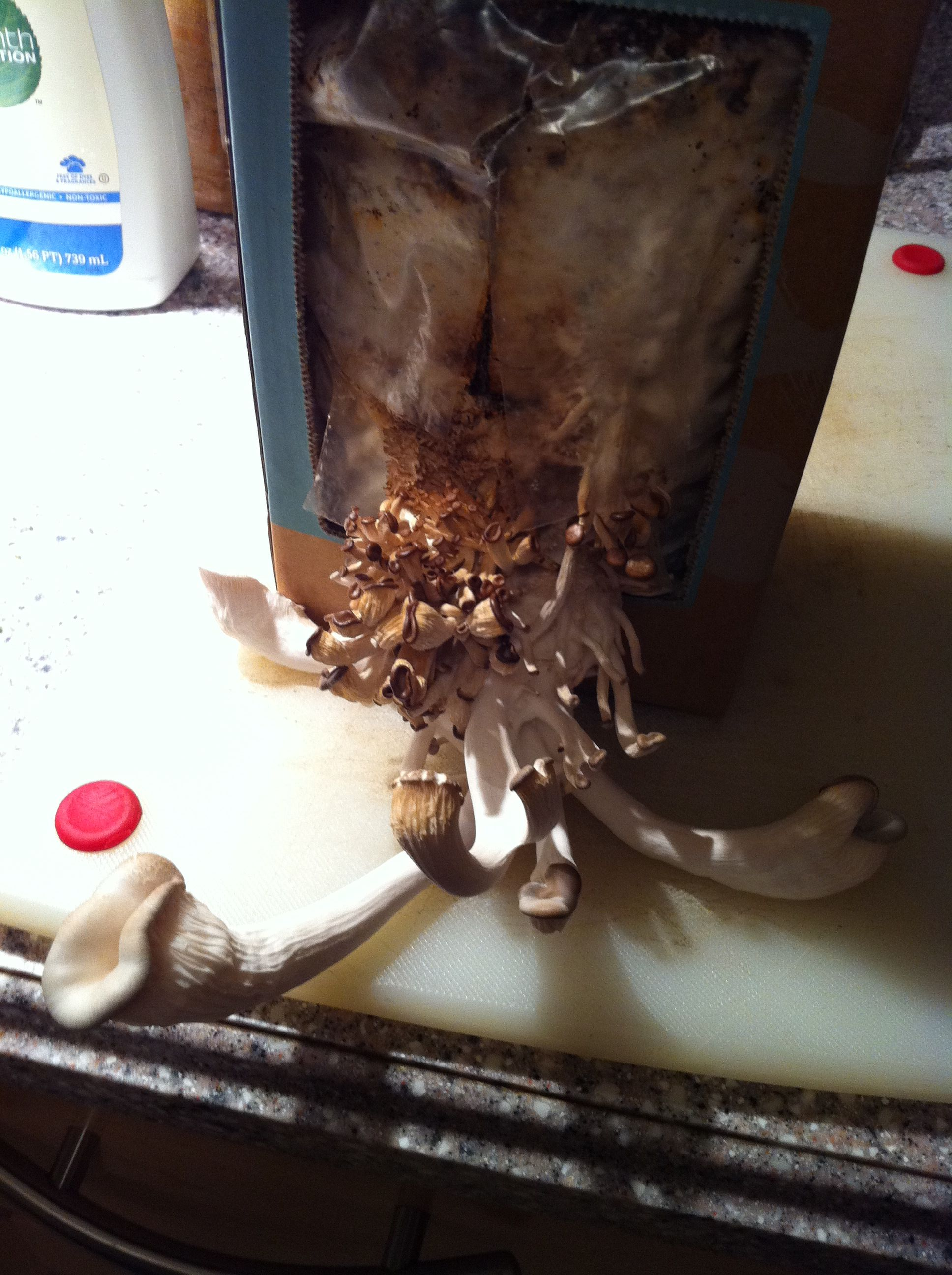
Edible oyster mushrooms growing on used coffee grounds

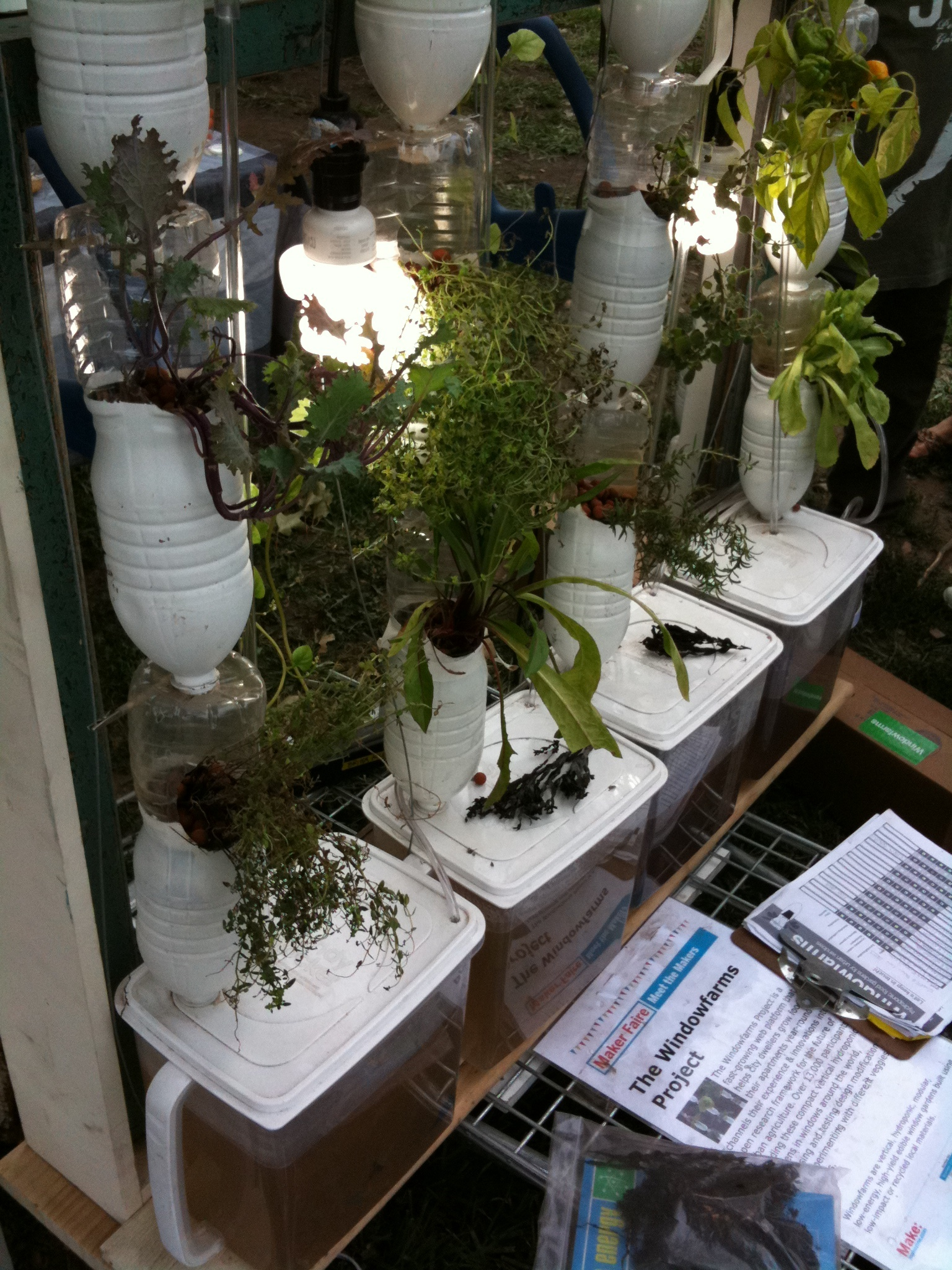
A windowfarm, incorporating discarded plastic bottles into pots for hydroponic agriculture in urban windows.

The current industrial agriculture system is accountable for high energy costs for the transportation of foodstuffs. According to a study by Rich Pirog, associate director of the Leopold Center for Sustainable Agriculture at Iowa State University, the average conventional produce item travels 1,500 miles (2,400 km), using, if shipped by tractor-trailer, 1 US gallon (3.8 L; 0.83 imp gal) of fossil fuel per 100 pounds (45 kg). The energy used to transport food is decreased when urban agriculture can provide cities with locally grown food. Pirog found that traditional, non-local, food distribution system used 4 to 17 times more fuel and emitted 5 to 17 times more CO_{2} than the local and regional transport.

Similarly, in a study by Marc Xuereb and Region of Waterloo Public Health, it was estimated that switching to locally-grown food could save transport-related emissions equivalent to nearly 50,000 metric tons of CO_{2}, or the equivalent of taking 16,191 cars off the road.

In theory one would save money, but everything is being run on the house's power grid most of the time. So prices can vary according to when you water, or how you water, etc.

=== Carbon footprint ===
As mentioned above, the energy-efficient nature of urban agriculture can reduce each city's carbon footprint by reducing the amount of transport that occurs to deliver goods to the consumer. Such areas can act as carbon sinks offsetting some of the carbon accumulation that is innate to urban areas, where pavement and buildings outnumber plants. Plants absorb atmospheric carbon dioxide (CO_{2}) and release breathable oxygen (O_{2}) through photosynthesis. The process of Carbon Sequestration can be further improved by combining other agriculture techniques to increase removal from the atmosphere and prevent the release of CO_{2} during harvest time. However, this process relies heavily on the types of plants selected and the methodology of farming. Specifically, choosing plants that do not lose their leaves and remain green all year can increase the farm's ability to sequester carbon.

=== Reduction in ozone and particulate matter ===
The reduction in ozone and other particulate matter can benefit human health. Reducing these particulates and ozone gases could reduce mortality rates in urban areas along with increase the health of those living in cities. A 2011 article found that a rooftop containing 2000 m^{2} of uncut grass has the potential to remove up to 4000 kg of particulate matter and that one square meter of green roof is sufficient to offset the annual particulate matter emissions of a car.

=== Soil decontamination ===
Vacant urban lots are often victims to illegal dumping of hazardous chemicals and other wastes. They are also liable to accumulate standing water and "grey water", which can be dangerous to public health, especially left stagnant for long periods. The implementation of urban agriculture in these vacant lots can be a cost-effective method for removing these chemicals. In the process known as Phytoremediation, plants and the associated microorganisms are selected for their chemical ability to degrade, absorb, convert to an inert form, and remove toxins from the soil. Several chemicals can be targeted for removal, including heavy metals (e.g. Mercury and lead), inorganic compounds (e.g. Arsenic and Uranium), and organic compounds (e.g. petroleum and chlorinated compounds like PCBs).

Phytoremediation is an environmentally-friendly, cost-effective, and energy-efficient measure to reduce pollution. Phytoremediation only costs about $5–$40 per ton of soil being decontaminated. Implementation of this process also reduces the amount of soil that must be disposed of in a hazardous waste landfill.

Differing techniques used in phytoremediation include the use of phytostabilization and phytovolatilization. The most commonly used technique is phytoextraction. In this strategy, plants extract heavy metal(loid)s from the soil through their root systems, with the contaminants accumulating in the aerial portions of the plants.

Urban agriculture as a method to mediate chemical pollution can be effective in preventing the spread of these chemicals into the surrounding environment. Other methods of remediation often disturb the soil and force the chemicals contained within it into the air or water. Plants can be used as a method to remove chemicals and also to hold the soil and prevent erosion of contaminated soil decreasing the spread of pollutants and the hazard presented by these lots.

One way of identifying soil contamination is through using already well-established plants as bioindicators of soil health. Using well-studied plants is important because there has already been substantial bodies of work to test them in various conditions, so responses can be verified with certainty. Such plants are also valuable because they are genetically identical as crops as opposed to natural variants of the same species. Typically urban soil has had the topsoil stripped away and has led to soil with low aeration, porosity, and drainage. Typical measures of soil health are microbial biomass and activity, enzymes, soil organic matter (SOM), total nitrogen, available nutrients, porosity, aggregate stability, and compaction. A new measurement is active carbon (AC), which is the most usable portion of the total organic carbon (TOC) in the soil. This contributes greatly to the functionality of the soil food web. Using common crops, which are generally well-studied, as bioindicators can be used to effectively test the quality of an urban farming plot before beginning planting.

Urban soil contamination remains a persistent challenge in cities with histories of industrial activity, leaded gasoline, or housing painted with lead-based paint. Recent studies have shown that a significant proportion of community garden soils in major cities contain lead concentrations exceeding safe thresholds for children, which poses a public health concern for urban farmers and local residents. Exposure pathways include inhalation of dust, ingestion of contaminated produce, and direct contact with soil, with children being particularly vulnerable. Experts recommend site-specific soil testing, inclusive community outreach, and tailored remediation strategies to reduce risks while supporting equitable access to gardening space.

One such remediation strategy is phytoremediation, which uses hyperaccumulator plants like Brassica juncea to extract metals from soil. While phytoremediation alone may be too slow for some urban contexts, it is often paired with additional measures such as raised beds, composting, or crop selection to lower contaminant exposure during food production. These integrative approaches are especially relevant for low-income neighborhoods, where budget constraints limit access to conventional remediation technologies. Improving awareness of these solutions is essential to ensure that soil decontamination practices support environmental justice as well as food security.

=== Noise pollution ===
Large amounts of noise pollution not only lead to lower property values and high frustration, they can be damaging to human hearing and health. The study "Noise exposure and public health" found that exposure to continual noise is a public health problem. Examples of the detriment of continual noise on humans to include: "hearing impairment, hypertension and ischemic heart disease, annoyance, sleep disturbance, and decreased school performance." Since most roofs or vacant lots consist of hard flat surfaces that reflect sound waves instead of absorbing them, adding plants that can absorb these waves has the potential to lead to a vast reduction in noise pollution.

=== Nutrition and quality of food ===
Daily intake of a variety of fruits and vegetables is linked to a decreased risk of chronic diseases including diabetes, heart disease, and cancer. Urban agriculture is associated with increased consumption of fruits and vegetables which decreases risk for disease and can be a cost-effective way to provide citizens with quality, fresh produce in urban settings.

Produce from urban gardens can be perceived to be more flavorful and desirable than store bought produce which may also lead to a wider acceptance and higher intake. A Flint, Michigan study found that those participating in community gardens consumed fruits and vegetables 1.4 times more per day and were 3.5 times more likely to consume fruits or vegetables at least 5 times daily (p. 1). Garden-based education can also yield nutritional benefits in children. An Idaho study reported a positive association between school gardens and increased intake of fruit, vegetables, vitamin A, vitamin C and fiber among sixth graders. Harvesting fruits and vegetables initiates the enzymatic process of nutrient degradation which is especially detrimental to water soluble vitamins such as ascorbic acid and thiamin. The process of blanching produce in order to freeze or can reduce nutrient content slightly, but not nearly as much as the amount of time spent in storage. Harvesting produce from one's own community garden cuts back on storage times significantly.

Urban agriculture also provides quality nutrition for low-income households. Studies show that every $1 invested in a community garden yields $6 worth of vegetables if labor is not considered a factor in investment. Many urban gardens reduce the strain on food banks and other emergency food providers by donating shares of their harvest and providing fresh produce in areas that otherwise might be food deserts. The supplemental nutrition program Women, Infants and Children (WIC) as well as the Supplemental Nutrition Assistance Program (SNAP) have partnered with several urban gardens nationwide to improve the accessibility to produce in exchange for a few hours of volunteer gardening work.

Urban farming has been shown to increase health outcomes. Gardeners consume twice as much fruit and vegetables than non-gardeners. Levels of physical activity are also positively associated with urban farming. These results are seen indirectly and can be supported by the social involvement in an individual's community as a member of the community farm. This social involvement helped raise the aesthetic appeal of the neighborhood, boosting the motivation or efficacy of the community as a whole. This increased efficacy was shown to increase neighborhood attachment. Therefore, the positive health outcomes of urban farming can be explained in part by interpersonal and social factors that boost health. Focusing on improving the aesthetics and community relationships and not only on the plant yield, is the best way to maximize the positive effect of urban farms on a neighborhood.

=== Health inequalities and food justice ===
A 2009 report by the USDA determined that "evidence is both abundant and robust enough for us to conclude that Americans living in low-income and minority areas tend to have poor access to healthy food", and that the "structural inequalities" in these neighborhoods "contribute to inequalities in diet and diet-related outcomes". These diet-related outcomes, including obesity and diabetes, have become epidemic in low-income urban environments in the United States. Although the definition and methods for determining "food deserts" have varied, studies indicate that, at least in the United States, there are racial disparities in the food environment. Thus using the definition of environment as the place where people live, work, play and pray, food disparities become an issue of environmental justice. This is especially true in American inner-cities where a history of racist practices have contributed to the development of food deserts in the low-income, minority areas of the urban core.

Not only can urban agriculture provide healthy, fresh food options, but also can contribute to a sense of community, aesthetic improvement, crime reduction, minority empowerment and autonomy, and even preserve culture through the use of farming methods and heirloom seeds preserved from areas of origin.

=== Environmental justice ===
Urban agriculture may advance environmental justice and food justice for communities living in food deserts. First, urban agriculture may reduce racial and class disparities in access to healthy food. When urban agriculture leads to locally grown fresh produce sold at affordable prices in food deserts, access to healthy food is not just available for those who live in wealthy areas, thereby leading to greater equity in rich and poor neighborhoods.

Improved access to food through urban agriculture can also help alleviate psychosocial stresses in poor communities. Community members engaged in urban agriculture improve local knowledge about healthy ways to fulfill dietary needs. Urban agriculture can also better the mental health of community members. Buying and selling quality products to local producers and consumers allows community members to support one another, which may reduce stress. Thus, urban agriculture can help improve conditions in poor communities, where residents experience higher levels of stress due to a perceived lack of control over the quality of their lives.

Urban agriculture may improve the livability and built environment in communities that lack supermarkets and other infrastructure due to the presence of high unemployment caused by deindustrialization. Urban farmers who follow sustainable agricultural methods can not only help to build local food system infrastructure, but can also contribute to improving local air, and water and soil quality. Urban farming serves as one type of green space in urban areas, it has a positive impact on the air quality in the surrounding area. A case study conducted on a rooftop farm shows the PM2.5 concentration in the urban farming area is 7–33% lower than the surrounding parts without green spaces in a city. When agricultural products are produced locally within the community, they do not need to be transported, which reduces CO_{2} emission rates and other pollutants that contribute to high rates of asthma in lower socioeconomic areas. Sustainable urban agriculture can also promote worker protection and consumer rights. For example, communities in New York City, Illinois, and Richmond, Virginia, have demonstrated improvements to their local environments through urban agricultural practices.

However, urban agriculture can also present urban growers with health risks if the soil used for urban farming is contaminated. Lead contamination is particularly common, with hazardous levels of lead found in soil in many United States cities. High lead levels in soil originate from sources including flaking lead paint which was widely used before being banned in the 1970s, vehicle exhaust, and atmospheric deposition. Without proper education on the risks of urban farming and safe practices, urban consumers of urban agricultural produce may face additional health-related issues.

== Implementation ==
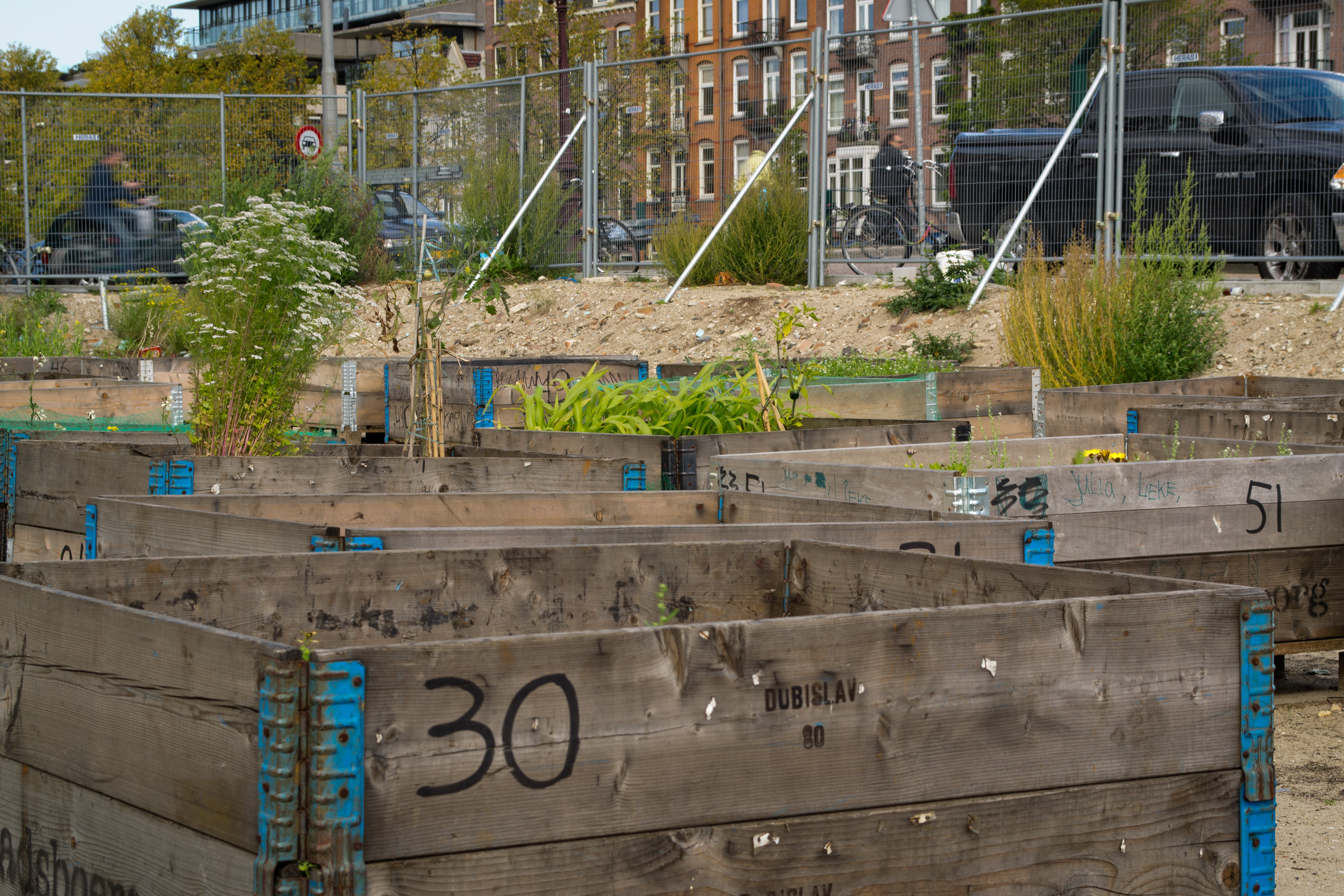
A small urban farm in Amsterdam

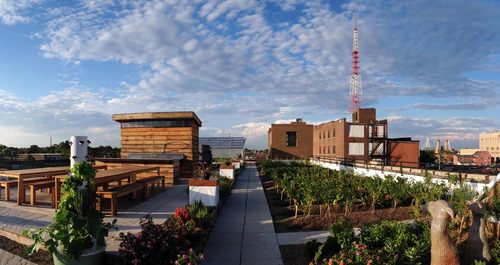
Rooftop urban farming at the Food Roof Farm in downtown St. Louis, Missouri.

Creating a community-based infrastructure for urban agriculture means establishing local systems to grow and process food and transfer it from farmer to consumer.

To facilitate food production, cities have established community-based farming projects. Some projects have collectively tended community farms on common land, much like that of the eighteenth-century Boston Common. One such community farm is the Collingwood Children's Farm in Melbourne, Australia. Other community garden projects use the allotment garden model, in which gardeners care for individual plots in a larger gardening area, often sharing a tool shed and other amenities. Seattle's P-Patch Gardens use this model, as did the South Central Farm in Los Angeles and the Food Roof Farm in St. Louis. Independent urban gardeners also grow food in individual yards and on roofs. Garden sharing projects seek to pair producers with the land, typically, residential yard space. Roof gardens allow for urban dwellers to maintain green spaces in the city without having to set aside a tract of undeveloped land. Rooftop farms allow otherwise unused industrial roofspace to be used productively, creating work and profit. Projects around the world seek to enable cities to become 'continuous productive landscapes' by cultivating vacant urban land and temporary or permanent kitchen gardens.

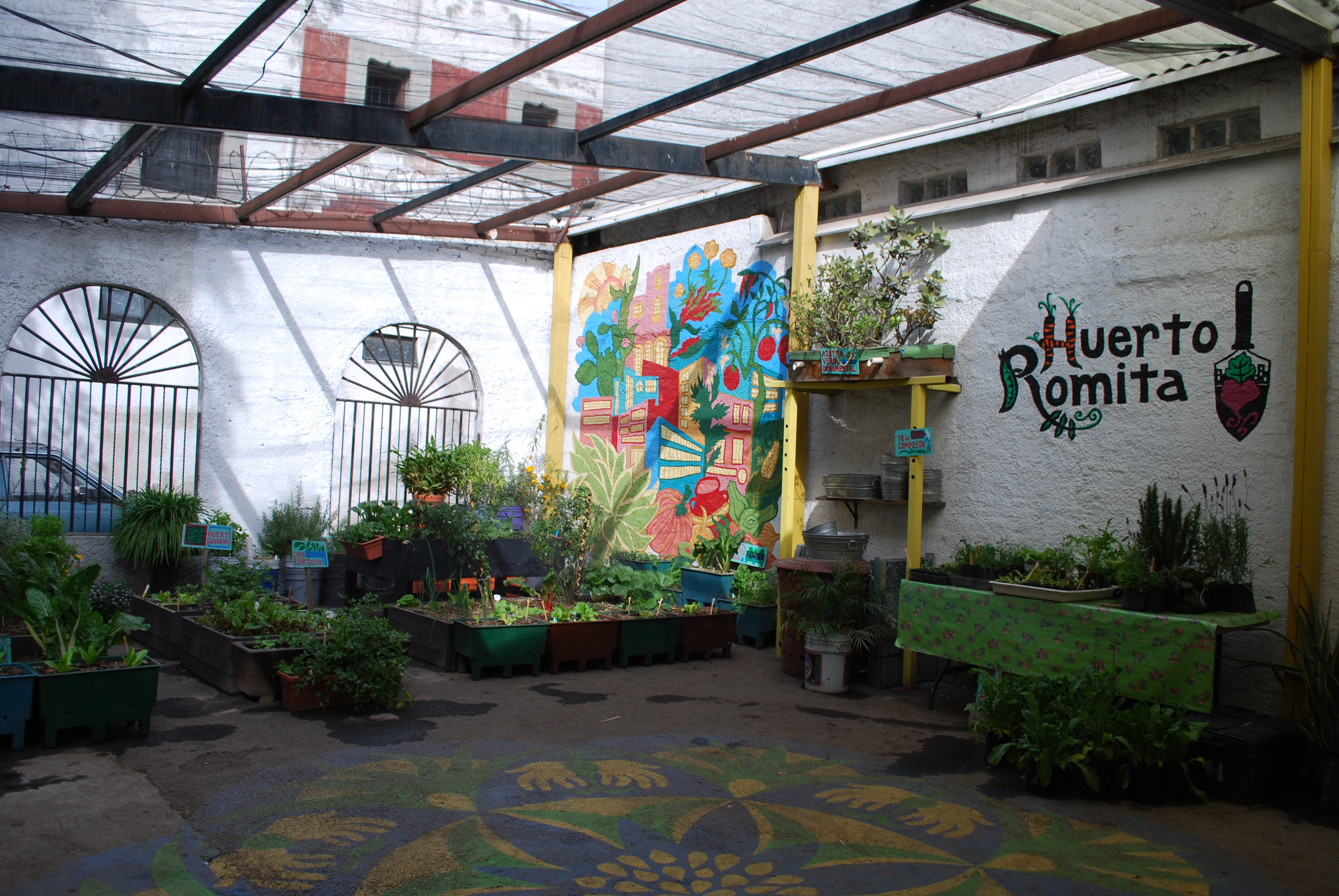
Urban agriculture project in the La Romita section of Colonia Roma, Mexico City.

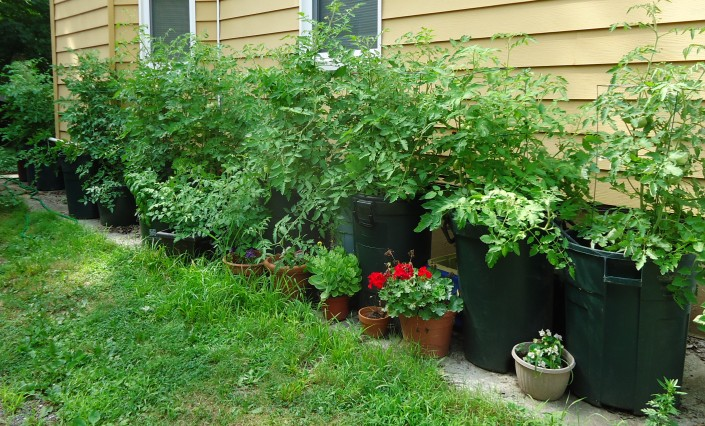
Tomato plants growing in a pot farming alongside a small house in New Jersey in fifteen garbage cans filled with soil grew over 700 tomatoes during the summer of 2013.

Food processing on a community level has been accommodated by centralizing resources in community tool sheds and processing facilities for farmers to share. The Garden Resource Program Collaborative based in Detroit has cluster tool banks. Different areas of the city have tool banks where resources like tools, compost, mulch, tomato stakes, seeds, and education can be shared and distributed with the gardeners in that cluster. Detroit's Garden Resource Program Collaborative also strengthens their gardening community by providing access to their member's transplants; education on gardening, policy, and food issues; and by building connectivity between gardeners through workgroups, potlucks, tours, field trips, and cluster workdays. In Brazil, "Cities Without Hunger" has generated a public policy for the reconstruction of abandoned areas with food production and has improved the green areas of the community.

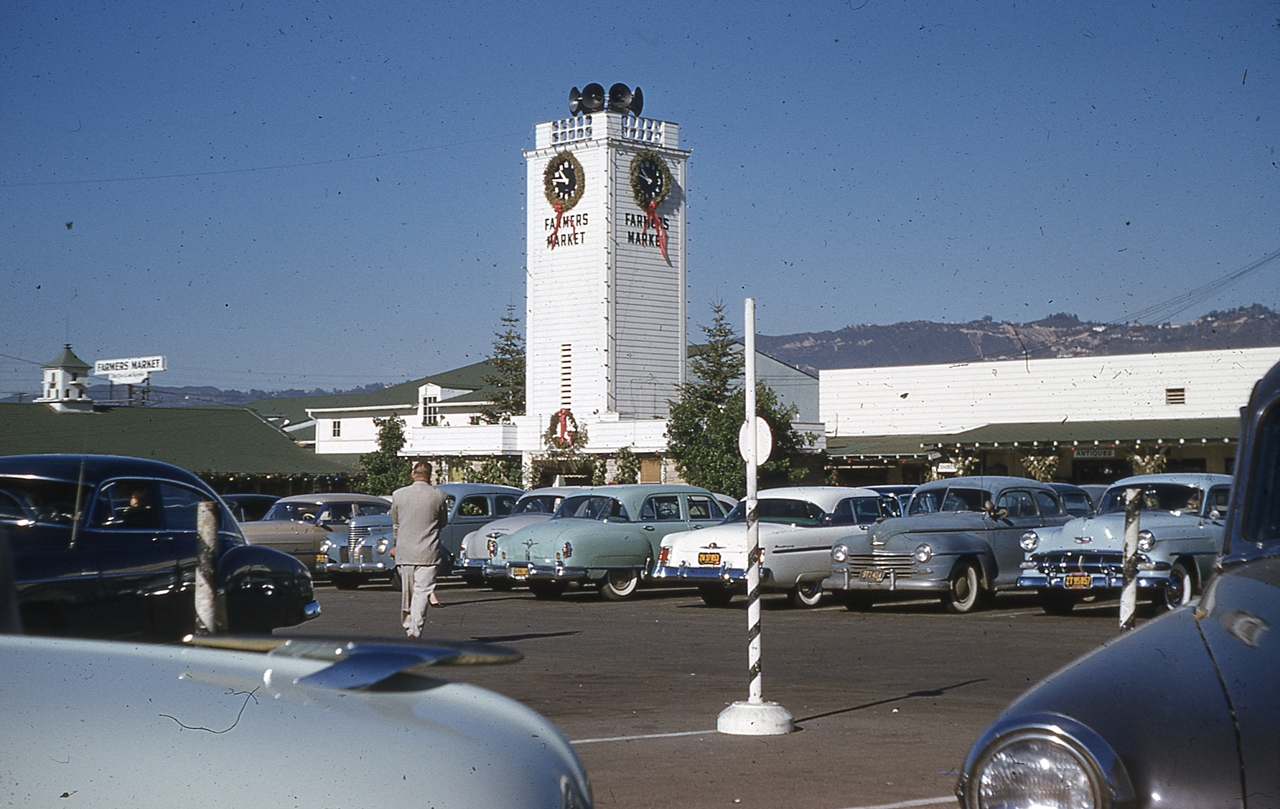
the Los Angeles Farmer's Market in 1953

Farmers' markets, such as the farmers' market in Los Angeles, provide a common land where farmers can sell their product to consumers. Large cities tend to open their farmer's markets on the weekends and one day in the middle of the week. For example, the farmers' market of Boulevard Richard-Lenoir in Paris, France, is open on Sundays and Thursdays. However, to create a consumer dependency on urban agriculture and to introduce local food production as a sustainable career for farmers, markets would have to be open regularly. For example, the Los Angeles Farmers' Market is open seven days a week and has linked several local grocers together to provide different food products. The market's central location in downtown Los Angeles provides the perfect interaction for a diverse group of sellers to access their consumers.

== Benefits ==
The benefits of UA for cities that implement this practice are numerous. Cities' transformation from food consumers to generators of agricultural products contributes to sustainability, improved health, and poverty alleviation.

- UA creates circular energy loops in which food is consumed in the same place it is produced, and waste is not exported to the peripheral rural areas.
- Wastewater and organic solid waste can be transformed into resources for growing agriculture products: the former can be used for irrigation, the latter as fertilizer.
- Vacant urban areas can be used for agriculture production instead of sitting unused
- Using wastewater for irrigation improves water management and increases the availability of fresh water for drinking and household consumption.
- UPA can help to preserve bioregional ecologies from being transformed into cropland.
- Urban agriculture saves energy (e.g., energy consumed in transporting food from rural to urban areas).
- Local food production also allows savings in transportation costs, storage, and product loss, which results in a reduction in food costs.
- UA improves the quality of the urban environment through greening and, thus, reduces pollution.
- Urban agriculture also makes the city a healthier place to live by improving the quality of the environment.
- UPA is a very effective tool for fighting hunger and malnutrition since it facilitates access to food for an impoverished sector of the urban population.

A large part of urban agriculture involves the urban poor. In developing countries, the majority of urban agricultural production is for self-consumption, with surpluses sold in the market. According to the FAO (Food and Agriculture Organization of the United Nations), poor urban consumers spend 60–80% of their income on food, making them vulnerable to higher food prices.

- UPA provides food and creates savings in household consumable expenditures, thus increasing the amount of income allocated to other uses.
- UPA surpluses can be sold in local markets, generating more income for the urban poor.

Community centers and gardens educate the community to see agriculture as an integral part of urban life. The Florida House Institute for Sustainable Development in Sarasota, Florida serves as a public community and education center where innovators with sustainable, energy-saving ideas can implement and test them. Community centers like Florida House integrate agriculture into the urban lifestyle by providing centralized urban areas to learn about urban agriculture and food production.

Urban farms also see use as an educational tool for teaching children about healthy eating and meaningful physical activity.

== Trade-offs ==
- Space is at a premium in cities and is accordingly expensive and difficult to secure.
- The utilization of untreated wastewater for urban agricultural irrigation can facilitate the spread of waterborne diseases among the human population.
- Although studies have demonstrated improved air quality in urban areas related to the proliferation of urban gardens, it has also been shown that increasing urban pollution (related specifically to a sharp rise in the number of automobiles on the road), has led to an increase in insect pests, which consume plants produced by urban agriculture. It is believed that changes to the physical structure of the plants themselves, which have been correlated to increased levels of air pollution, increase plants' palatability to insect pests. Reduced yields within urban gardens decreases the amount of food available for human consumption.
- Studies indicate that the nutritional quality of wheat suffers when urban wheat plants are exposed to high nitrogen dioxide and sulfur dioxide concentrations. This problem is particularly acute in the developing world, where outdoor concentrations of sulfur dioxide are high and large percentages of the population rely upon urban agriculture as a primary source of food. These studies have implications for the nutritional quality of other staple crops that are grown in urban settings.
- Agricultural activities on land that is contaminated (with such metals as lead) pose potential risks to human health. These risks are associated both with working directly on contaminated land and with consuming food that was grown in contaminated soil.

Municipal greening policy goals can pose conflicts. For example, policies promoting urban tree canopy are not sympathetic to vegetable gardening because of the deep shade cast by trees. However, some municipalities like Portland, Oregon, and Davenport, Iowa are encouraging the implementation of fruit-bearing trees (as street trees or as park orchards) to meet both greening and food production goals.

== See also ==
- Allotment (gardening)
- Asset-based community development
- Building-integrated agriculture
- Ecological sanitation
- Foodscaping
- Forest gardening
- Green wall
- Growbag
- Growroom
- Guerrilla gardening
- Market garden
- Metropolitan agriculture
- Permaculture
- Rooftop gardens
- Satoyama
- Sheet mulching
- Smallholding
- Subsistence agriculture
- Terraces (agriculture)
- Underground farming
- Urban horticulture
- Urban forestry
- Vertical farming
- Windowfarm
