= Mario Petrucci =

British poet, literary translator, educator and broadcaster

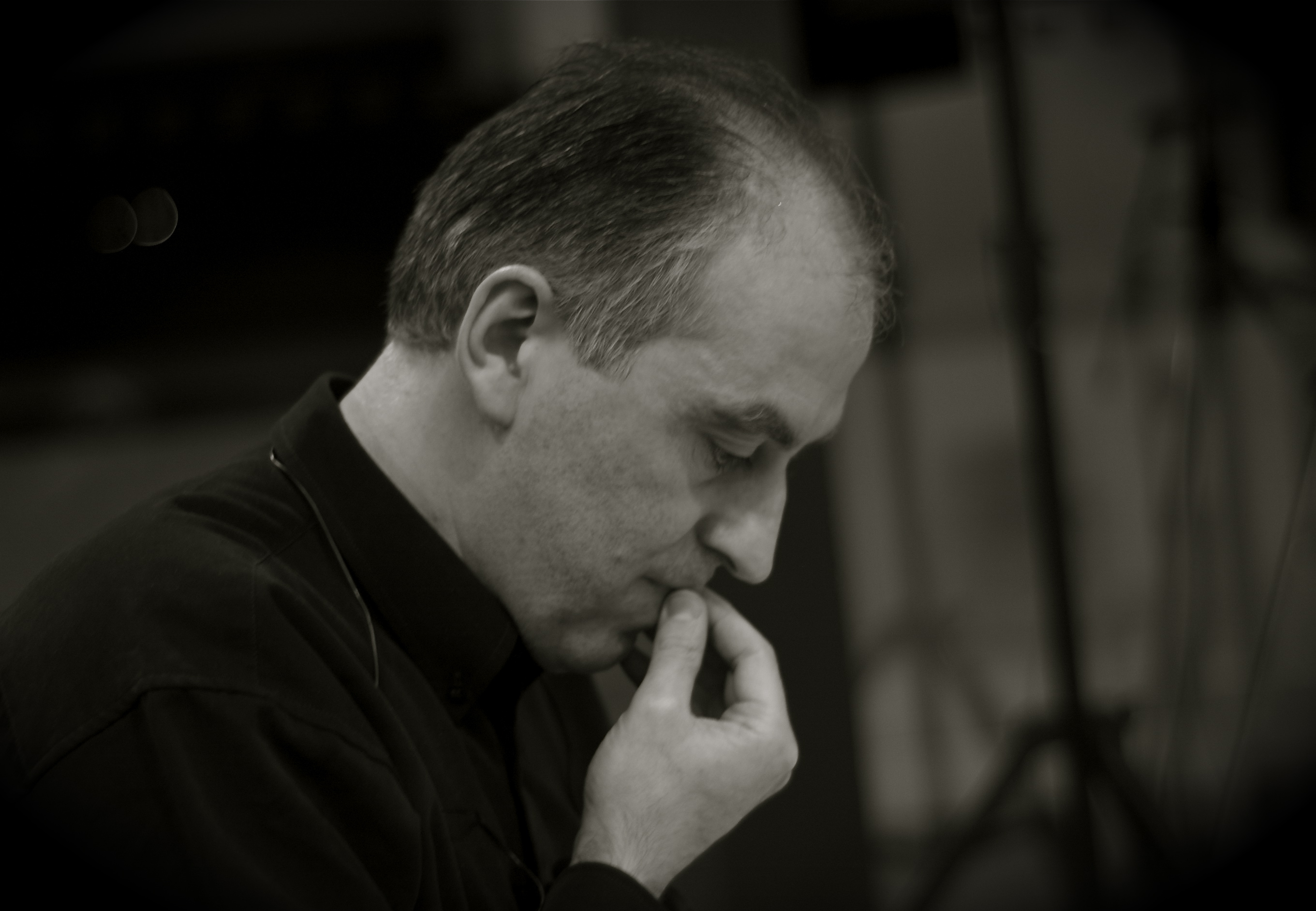
- Born: Mario Petrucci; Lambeth, London, UK
- Citizenship: United Kingdom
- Education: University of Cambridge, University College London, Middlesex University
- Occupations: Poet, physicist, ecologist
- Writing career
- Genres: Poetry, Science, Education
- Website: mariopetrucci.com

Mario Petrucci (born 1958) is a British-Italian poet, literary translator, educator and broadcaster, known for his work in science-related poetry and in Ecopoetry. He was born in Lambeth, London and trained as a physicist at Selwyn College in the University of Cambridge, later completing a PhD in vacuum crystal growth at University College London. He is also an ecologist, having a BA in Environmental Science from Middlesex University. After his early scientific career, Petrucci shifted to literary projects, serving as the first poet-in-residence at the Imperial War Museum and BBC Radio 3. ClimateCultures, in its profile of Petrucci, describes him as "among the earliest poets to publish the kind of ecologically-centred collection that poetry lists now readily identify as 'ecopoetry'.”

Petrucci's work with poetry and film occurs in educational, cultural and community settings, addressing human conflict, environmental issues, science, and public and private memory. His broadcast outlets include BBC radio’s Kaleidoscope, London Nights, Sunday Feature, Night Waves, The Verb and the BBC World Service, as well as BBC TV. Between 2011 and 2013, his regular column for The Day Digest in Ukraine explored the philosophy of art and society, while in 2022 the Kyiv Post published his Ukraine-based poem in response to "challenging times".

== Literary record ==
Petrucci's poetry debut, Shrapnel and Sheets (1996), won a Poetry Book Society Recommendation. Ensuing literary awards include the Irish Times Perpetual Trophy, the Arvon International Poetry Prize (with The Daily Telegraph), the London Writers Competition (four times), the Sheffield Thursday Prize (twice), the Bridport Poetry Prize, and the Silver Wyvern Award. Altogether, between 1991 and 2005, Petrucci won a total of 22 national and international open poetry/writing competitions. His poetry has appeared in The Spectator, The Independent, the Daily Mail, The Daily Telegraph and The Guardian, with his collections often relating to specific cultural sites, or focusing on love/loss, the tragedies of warfare, and science in the natural world.

Petrucci was shortlisted for the 2012 Ted Hughes Award with a poetry soundscape, Tales from the Bridge. Commissioned by the Mayor of London, this installation spanned the Thames as part of the London 2012 Cultural Olympiad. Petrucci created a hybrid script of prose and poetry, featuring interleaving spoken elements "assembled from literary forms such as short poems, atmospheric descriptions, local anecdotes, facts and figures". Collaborators for the project included Martyn Ware (Heaven 17) and Eric Whitacre, whose music was used. The soundscape played for two months along the length of the Millennium Bridge and was "experienced by an estimated four million people".

A contributor since the 1980s to science poetry and Ecopoetry, Petrucci was appointed ‘Ecopoetry Network Coordinator’ to the Planetary Arts Movement in 2026, under the auspices of The World Academy of Art & Science. He is also included in the Archive of the Now (audio recordings of modern UK poets) and in the Poets & Writers Directory (USA). His published collections are held internationally, including: (Europe) BNC Rome, BNC Florence, Berlin State Library and UCL small press; and (USA) Poets House (New York), Harvard, Berkeley, Buffalo and the Library of Congress. In 2023, his literary archive was acquired by the British Library, and The Poetry Archive acquired a number of his audio recordings for public and educational access in 2025.

== Poetry, translation, film ==
A poet with a substantial body of work, Petrucci's style and forms have evolved across time. His early poetry was varied, by turns spiritual/devotional, open-mic/humour/performance-oriented, political/satirical, ecopoetic/scientific, site-specific, war-related and confessional (the latter often centred on relationships, childhood, or his Italian heritage and family); later work focused more consistently on love/loss and followed a more systematic neo-modernist drive (with eco-aware, metaphysical and 'concrete' leanings), punctuated by public commissions and a growing engagement with influential authors from other cultures and epochs.

At this stage, Petrucci initiated the i tulips sequence, an experimental project that represented a major phase in his neo‑modernist development. Comprising 1111 poems with a 1111-line coda in 11 parts, the Poetry Book Society described it as an “ambitious landmark body of work”. Endorsed by Roy Fisher and Bill Berkson, the sequence combines imagery and musicality within a newly developed undulating form, producing what one critic termed “an energetic fusion of American and British modernism”. Alongside this, Petrucci has been involved in literary translation: 2018 brought his English versions of the Persian mystic poet Hafez via Bloodaxe Books, and in 2022 he was invited by the Society of Authors to judge the John Florio Prize for Italian translation. He has published versions of Catullus, Sappho, Rumi, Saadi and the Nobel-winning Eugenio Montale.

Petrucci's poetry has been used in several films. Heavy Water: a film for Chernobyl and Half Life: a Journey to Chernobyl were two sibling features by Seventh Art Productions, built around his poetry sequence on the Chernobyl disaster. Voiced by Juliet Stevenson, David Threlfall and Samuel West, these films have received awards such as the Cinequest, as well as screenings on mainstream television and at Tate Modern (in 2007). He later scripted the art film Amazonia, set in Peru, commissioned by the Natural History Museum, London to comment on the global role of rainforests.

== Cultural, Educational, Cross-disciplinary (science-ecology-arts) work ==
Petrucci's poems, short stories, articles and essays often engage in a cross-disciplinary way with creativity, politics, science and the environment. He examines the role of eco-art in countering the resistance to pro-environmental change, as well as the interaction between disciplines when 'Scientific Visualizations' are applied as visual analogies to specific literary aspects of the humanities. He has undertaken cross-disciplinary commissions involving sustainability and the arts, delivering talks for the British Council and the United Nations, including the UN's "first major event" (Belgrade, 2025) for its 'International Decade of Sciences for Sustainable Development'.

For several decades, Petrucci has also been involved in the educational sector, in creative writing and literary mentoring, as facilitator for youth and diversity, and in the incorporation of science and ecology with creative writing praxis. He was founder/co-founder for several London-based literary initiatives, including: the poetry magazine The Bound Spiral; the experimental collaborative 'co-vocal' poetry performance troupe ShadoWork; and the Arts Council/ London Arts funded organisation writers inc., which ran literary workshops and events, along with grassroots competitions for emerging writers. His various roles have included being inaugural pamphlet selector for the Poetry Book Society between 2003 and 2005, awarding the prize to early work by poets Frances Leviston and Daljit Nagra.

Petrucci has collaborated with museums, including several of the Imperial War Museum's sites, the Charles Dickens Museum, Southwell Workhouse, the Wellcome Collection, and the Natural History Museum, London. He has also worked with other cultural organisations, among them the Royal College of Surgeons of England, the European Space Agency, the London School of Economics, and the Royal Festival Hall. He held Royal Literary Fund Fellowships at Oxford Brookes University, University of Westminster, Brunel University London, and the City and Guilds of London Art School.

== Critical ideas ==
Petrucci has proposed the concept of Spatial Form, a framework that extends concrete poetry to include all the visual detail of a poem.^{[a]} He has also introduced the critical terms 'Poeclectics' ("a key component of which is... the multiple use of voices, masks and personae") and 'sonic stitching', as well as the prose sub-genre 'Eco-sci-fi Flash Fiction'. Petrucci’s Writing Into Freedom initiative is an archived non-commercial YouTube channel and its companion website, documenting his writing exercises and fellowship work.

== Books and pamphlets ==
=== Poetry ===
- Shrapnel and Sheets (Headland, 1996) ISBN 0-903074-92-3 (Poetry Book Society Recommendation).
- Bosco (Hearing Eye: pamphlet 1999; book 2001) ISBN 1-870841-64-6 & ISBN 1-870841-77-8.
- Lepidoptera (Kite Modern Poetry Series, 88 & 96; 1999, 2001) ISBN 0-907759-47-5 & ISBN 0-907759-87-4.
- The Stamina of Sheep (the Havering Poems) (Havering London Borough Council / Bound Spiral Press, 2002) ISBN 0-9539939-1-4.
- Heavy Water: a poem for Chernobyl (Enitharmon Press, 2004) ISBN 1-900564-34-3.
- Half Life (Poems for Chernobyl) (Heaventree Press, 2004) ISBN 0-9545317-3-6.
- Fearnought (Poems for Southwell Workhouse) (The National Trust, 2006) ISBN 1-84359-251-7 or ISBN 978-1-84359-251-8.
- Flowers of Sulphur (Enitharmon Press, 2007) ISBN 978-1-904634-37-9.
- somewhere is january (Perdika Press, 2007) ISBN 978-1-905649-06-8.
- i tulips (Enitharmon Press, 2010) ISBN 978-1-904634-93-5.
- Nights * Sifnos * Hands (Flarestack Poets, 2010) ISBN 978-1-906480-24-0.
- the waltz in my blood (Waterloo Press, 2011) ISBN 978-190674240-9.
- the inward garden (St Edmund’s College, 2013) [limited edition] ISBN 978-0-9538316-9-2.
- anima (Nine Arches Press, 2013) ISBN 978-0-9573847-3-6.
- crib (Enitharmon Press, 2014) ISBN 978-1-907587-80-1.
- 1111 (Perdika Press, 2014) ISBN 978-1-905649-18-1.
- afterlove (Cinnamon Press, 2020) ISBN 978-1-78864-095-4.
- Moonbird : love poems (Fair Acre Press, 2023) ISBN 978-1-911048-74-9.
- Prodigal Flowers (Ten Ecopoems) (Candlestick Press, 2026) ISBN 978-1-913627-79-9.

=== Poetry translations & versions ===
- Catullus (Perdika Press, 2006) ISBN 1-905649-00-2 (second re-print 2007, ISBN 978-1-905649-00-6).
- Sappho (Perdika Press, 2008) ISBN 978-1-905649-09-9.
- Xenia (Arc Publications, 2016) ISBN 978-1-910345-53-5 <Petrucci's translation of Xenia by Eugenio Montale>.
- Beloved: 81 poems from Hafez (Bloodaxe Books, 2018) ISBN 978-1-780374-30-7 (Petrucci's translation of The Divan by Persian mystic poet Hafez).
- Isha Upanishad (Guillemot Press, 2019) (a modern English vers libre version of the ancient sacred Hindu text, the Isha Upanishad) <no ISBN>.
- Dawn Ravens (23 poems from Saadi and Rumi) (Lapwing Publications, 2022) ISBN 978-1-7397938-6-9.

=== Prose & educational ===
- The Havering Poetry Study Pack (Havering London Borough Council / Bound Spiral Press, 2002) ISBN 0-9539939-2-2.
- High Zest and the Doggerel March (Wilfred Owen – Genius or Sugar-stick?) (Bound Spiral Press, 2002) ISSN 0955-3819.
- When She Was (Valley Press, 2026) ISBN 978-1-915606-99-0 <debut novel>.
- Letters to Ukraine (Micro-Essays on some of life's Macro-Questions) (Iff Books, 2027) ISBN 978-1-80695-203-8; e-book ISBN 978-1-80695-204-5 <philosophical, political, metaphysical, spiritual 'micro-essays'>.

== Films ==
- Heavy Water: a film for Chernobyl (with Phil Grabsky & David Bickerstaff) Seventh Art Productions, 2006.
- Half Life: a journey to Chernobyl (with Phil Grabsky & David Bickerstaff) Seventh Art Productions, 2006.
- Amazonia (with Lucy + Jorge Orta), commissioned by the Natural History Museum, 2010.

== Awards ==
- 1993 Winner, London Writers Competition
- 1995 Edith Kitt Memorial Award
- 1996 Poetry Book Society Recommendation
- 1996 Edith Kitt Memorial Award
- 1997 Winner, Sheffield Thursday Prize
- 1997 Winner, inaugural Irish Times Perpetual Trophy
- 1998 New London Writers Award (London Arts)
- 1998 Winner, London Writers Competition
- 1998 Winner, Sheffield Thursday Prize
- 1999 Bridport Poetry Prize
- 2002 Daily Telegraph / Arvon International Poetry Prize
- 2002 Arts Council England Writers' Award
- 2003 Essex Book Awards Best Fiction Prize 2000–2002
- 2003 Silver Wyvern Award
- 2004 Winner, London Writers Competition
- 2004 National Poetry Competition: third prize cum laude
- 2005/2006 Arts Council England Grants for the Arts: Science in Poetry
- 2005 Winner, London Writers Competition
- 2007 Cinequest Film Festival Award, Best Short Documentary (Half Life: a Journey to Chernobyl)
- 2009/10 Arts Council England Grants for the Arts: i tulips
- 2012 Shortlisted for The Ted Hughes Award for New Work in Poetry: Tales from the Bridge
- 2016 Winner, PEN Translates Award
- 2018 Shortlisted: John Florio Prize for Italian Translation (with Xenia by Eugenio Montale)

== Notes ==
[a] - Petrucci's formulation of Spatial Form is not to be confused with Joseph Frank's unrelated 1945 term, dealing primarily with the abstract patterning of internal references and narratives implemented by an author across a work in order to create a unitary structure of meaning.
