= Underground farming =

Practice of cultivating food underground

Underground farming is the practice of cultivating food underground. Underground farming is usually done using hydroponics, aeroponics or air-dynaponics systems or container gardens. Light is generally provided by means of growth lamps or daylighting systems (as light tubes).

The advantages of underground farming are that it is independent of the environment above the ground. Thus, a hot or cold climate is more manageable underground. Also, possible air pollution gases can be more easily filtered. There is theoretically much space below ground. Thus, underground farming could be one part of the solution for higher food security.

On the downside, contemporary energy costs are high for the aforementioned growth lamps. Also, building underground spaces is expensive with current technology.

Mushrooms, particularly Agaricus bisporus, have been cultivated underground in France since the late 1800s. As of 2021, there are several acres of mushrooms grown in tunnels under Paris.

== Present systems ==
- The Lunar greenhouse is an underground farm made by Phil Sadles and Gene Giacomelli of the University of Arizona's Controlled Environment Agriculture Center (CEAC) The urine and exhaled air of the astronauts is reused in the system by the plants.
- GreenForges is a Canadian startup developing underground farming systems.

== See also ==
- Forestiere Underground Gardens
- Pot farming
- Rooftop farming
- Vertical farming
