= Myra Schneider =

British poet (born 1936)

- Born: 1936 (age 89–90); London, England
- Occupation: Poet
- Spouse: Erwin Schneider

Myra Schneider (born 1936) is a British poet. She grew up in Scotland, London, and Sussex and read English at London University. She has worked for an educational publisher and as a teacher in a comprehensive school and a tutor to people with literacy problems, as well as working for many years with severely disabled adults. She lives in London with her husband, a retired computer consultant, and they have one son.

== Career ==
After writing mainly fiction for some years, Myra Schneider had her first collection of poetry (Fistful of Yellow Hope, Littlewood Arc) published in 1984. In addition to many poems published in magazines, newspapers and anthologies, 11 other poetry publications have appeared since then: Cat Therapy (1986), Cathedral of Birds (1988) and Crossing Point (1991), all from Littlewood Arc; Opening the Ice (1990, Smith Doorstep) with Ann Dancy; Exits (1991), The Panic Bird (1998), Insisting on Yellow (2000), Multiplying the Moon (2004); Circling the Core (2008),; and The Door to Colour (2014), all from Enitharmon; Becoming (2007), What Women Want (2012) and Persephone in Finsbury Park (2016) from Second Light Publications; and Lifting the Sky from Ward Wood Publications (2018) . A large number of poems have been published by Les Murray in the Australian cultural magazine Quadrant. The poem "Goulash" from Circling the Core was shortlisted for a Forward prize for best single poem, and three poem sequences won first prizes in Scintilla long poem competitions. Her work has also been broadcast.

In addition, Myra Schneider has written Writing My Way Through Cancer, a fleshed out journal with poem notes, poems and therapeutic writing ideas (Jessica Kingsley, 2003), and, with John Killick, Writing for Self-Discovery (Element Books, 1998) and Writing Your Self (Continuum, 2010). She also writes essays and reviews for literary magazines, and has co-edited anthologies of poetry by contemporary women poets, most recently Images of Women (Arrowhead, 2006). She is consultant to the Second Light Network of Women Poets, and she runs poetry workshops and courses and is a tutor for the Poetry School.

== Bibliography ==
=== Poetry ===
Collections

- Schneider, Myra (1984). Fistful of yellow hope. Hebden Bridge: Littlewood Press.
- — (1988). Cathedral of Birds.
- — (1989). Cat Therapy.
- — (1991). Crossing Point.
- — (1994). Exits.
- — (1998). The Panic Bird.
- — (2000). Insisting on Yellow.
- — (2004). Multiplying the Moon.
- — (2008). Circling the Core.
- — (2012). What Women Want.
- — (2014). The Door to Colour.

List of poems

Title	Year	First published	Reprinted/collected
The panic bird	1996	Schneider, Myra (May 1996). "The panic bird". Quadrant. 40 (5): 32.	
Woman in the bath	1996	Schneider, Myra (May 1996). "Woman in the bath". Quadrant. 40 (5): 32.	
Leavetaking	1996	Schneider, Myra (July–August 1996). "Leavetaking". Quadrant. 40 (7–8 [328]): 40.	
Moth	2003	Schneider, Myra (July–August 2003). "Moth". Quadrant. 47 (7–8 [398]): 14.	
Cinnamon	2003	Schneider, Myra (July–August 2003). "Cinnamon". Quadrant. 47 (7–8 [398]): 18.	
Le vieil homme Assis	2009	Schneider, Myra (December 2009). "Le vieil homme Assis". Quadrant. 40 (5): 32.	
