= A General Theory of Love =

2000 book by Thomas Lewis, Fari Amini, and Richard Lannon

- Authors: Thomas Lewis, Fari Amini, Richard Lannon
- Published: 2000
- Publisher: Random House

A General Theory of Love is a book about the science of human emotions and biological psychiatry written by Thomas Lewis, Fari Amini, and Richard Lannon, psychiatric professors at the University of California, San Francisco, and was first published by Random House in 2000. It has since been reissued twice, with new editions appearing in 2001 and 2007.

== Overview ==
The book examines the phenomenon of love and human connection from a combined scientific and cultural perspective. It attempts to reconcile the language and insights of humanistic inquiry and cultural wisdom (literature, song, poetry, painting, sculpture, dance and philosophy) with the more recent findings of social science, neuroscience and evolutionary biology.

A General Theory of Love has been compared to the work of Steven Pinker and Oliver Sacks. Since its first publication, the book has been translated into Spanish, Chinese, Japanese, Portuguese, Korean, Latvian, Croatian, and Persian.

== Contents ==
The book surveys scientific understanding of emotions and particularly intimacy and love, from Freud through modern neuroscience, with a focus on the emerging understanding of the limbic brain and the development of personality. The authors put forward the idea that our nervous systems are not separate or self-contained; beginning in earliest childhood, the areas of our brain identified as the limbic system (hippocampus, amygdala, anterior thalamic nuclei, and limbic cortex) is affected by those closest to us (limbic resonance) and synchronizes with them (limbic regulation) in a way that has profound implications for personality and lifelong emotional health. The authors maintain that various forms of therapy are effective not so much by virtue of their underlying theory or methodology, but to the degree to which the therapist is able to empathetically modify these set patterns (limbic revision). The authors go on to examine how many aspects of our society and social institutions have been constructed in a way that is incompatible with our innate biology, which gives rise to individual and social pathologies.

== Critical reception ==
A General Theory of Love received generally positive reviews, including Kirkus Reviews, Library Journal, the Washington Post, and the San Francisco Examiner. It reached number 5 slot on the San Francisco Chronicle's Non-Fiction best seller list. However, the book has been criticized for its "convoluted and opaque" prose style, as well as its extensive reliance on the model of the triune brain as defined by Paul D. MacLean, a model that has been variously categorized as obsolete, imprecise or unnecessary.

== See also ==
- Affective neuroscience
