= Urban wilderness =

Biodiversity

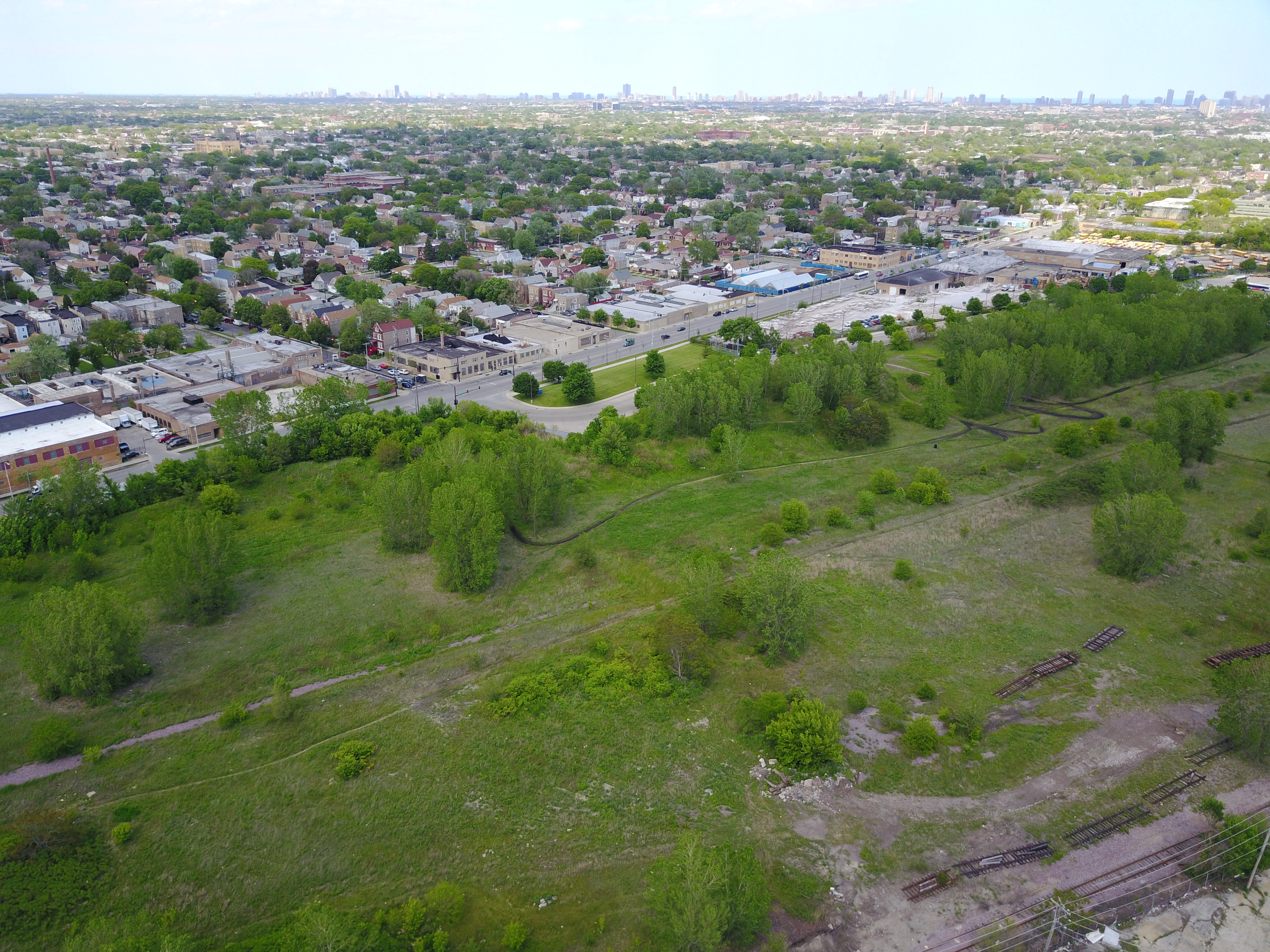
Urban wilderness in Chicago

Urban wilderness are informal green spaces within urban areas that are distant enough from urbanized areas so that human activities cannot be registered. Urban wilderness areas within cities have been shown to beneficially impact the public's perception of wilderness and nature, making this an important element to future city planning.

== Overview ==
Key traits of urban wilderness that differentiate it from other urban green spaces:

- Involves green spaces that are far enough removed from the urban areas, so human actions cannot be noticed.
- Supports biodiversity - Urban wilderness efforts aim to enhance/improve a regions' local biodiversity through careful management plans.
- A high degree of self-regulation - vegetation can survive with minimal interference or management by humans.

Various urban wilderness areas have been established throughout the world. Examples include the Knoxville Urban Wilderness in Knoxville, TN, Purgatory Creek Natural Area in San Marcos, TX, the Danube-Auen National Park in Vienna and Lower Austria, the Turkey Mountain Urban Wilderness Area in Tulsa, and the Milwaukee River Greenway in Milwaukee, WI.

== History ==
The nineteenth and twentieth centuries saw the urbanization of cities. Jacob Riis and other reformers fought for parks in urban areas.

While many societies had traditions of intense urban plantings, such as the rooftops of pre-Columbian Mexico City, these traditions did not reemerge on a larger scale in the industrialized world until the creation of naturalistic urban parks, such as the ones by Calvert Vaux and Frederick Law Olmsted.

More recently, groups such as squatters and Reclaim The Streets have performed guerrilla plantings, worked in and on abandoned buildings, and torn holes in highway asphalt to fill with soil and flowers. These actions have been effective in creating new planted zones in economically stagnant areas like urban Eastern Germany, where abandoned buildings have reverted to forest-like conditions.

== See also ==
- Forest park
- Green roof
- Green wall
- Hundertwasserhaus
- Reconciliation ecology
- Urban agriculture
- Urban ecology
- Urban forestry
- Urban green space
- Urban prairie
- Urban rewilding
