= Sunday Times Young Writer of the Year Award =

British literary prize

Sunday Times Charlotte Aitken Young Writer of the Year Award
- Description: Literary prize awarded to a British author under the age of 35 for a published work of fiction, non-fiction or poetry
- Country: United Kingdom
- Presented by: Society of Authors

The Sunday Times Charlotte Aitken Young Writer of the Year Award is a literary prize awarded to a British author under the age of 35 for a published work of fiction, non-fiction or poetry. It is administered by the Society of Authors and has been running since 1991.

== History ==
The Sunday Times Young Writer of the Year Award is said here to have originally run between 1991 and 2009, but there is evidence to confirm that it began twenty years earlier. At that time entries were confined to short stories and published in the newspaper itself. The 1974 winner was Charles Nicholl, who went on to become well-known for historical biographies. "The Ups and The Downs" was Charles Nicholl's disturbing and humorous account of a bad LSD trip in London.

In 1999, Paul Farley's The Boy from the Chemist is Here to See You "was so well received", according to the Encyclopedia of British Writers, that "it was named Sunday Times Young Writer of the Year Award".

It was re-invigorated with the support of literary agents Peters Fraser + Dunlop in 2015 under the new name Sunday Times / Peters Fraser + Dunlop Young Writer of the Year Award.

In 2019, the University of Warwick took over as co-sponsor. The award was renamed the Sunday Times / University of Warwick Young Writer of the Year Award.

== Name history ==
- 1991 to 2009 – Sunday Times Young Writer Award
- Starting 2015 – Sunday Times / Peters Fraser + Dunlop Young Writer of the Year Award
- Starting 2019 – Sunday Times / University of Warwick Young Writer of the Year Award
- Starting 2021 – Sunday Times Charlotte Aitken Young Writer of the Year Award

== Winners ==
Year	Author	Title	Publisher	Award	Judges
1991	Helen Simpson	Four Bare Legs in a Bed and Other Stories	William Heinemann	Winner	
1992	Caryl Phillips	Cambridge	Bloomsbury	Winner	
1993	Simon Armitage	Xanadu: A Poem Film for Television and Kid	Bloodaxe/Faber & Faber	Winner	
1994	William Dalrymple	City of Djinns: A Year in Dehli	HarperCollins	Winner	
1995	Andrew Cowan	Pig	Michael Joseph	Winner	
1996	Katherine Pierpoint	Truffle Beds	Faber & Faber	Winner	
1997	Francis Spufford	I May Be Some Time: Ice and the English Imagination	Faber & Faber	Winner	
1998	Patrick French	Liberty or Death: India's Journey to Independence and Division	HarperCollins	Winner	
1999	Paul Farley	The Boy from the Chemist is Here to See You	Pan Macmillan	Winner	
2000	Sarah Waters	Affinity	Virago	Winner	
2001	Zadie Smith	White Teeth	Hamish Hamilton	Winner	
2002	No award made				
2003	William Fiennes	The Snow Geese	Picador Classic	Winner	
2004	Robert Macfarlane	Mountains of the Mind	Granta Books	Winner	
2005	No award made				
2006	No award made				
2007	Naomi Alderman	Disobedience	Penguin	Winner	
2007	Horatio Clare	Running for the Hills	John Murray	Shortlist	
2007	Rory Stewart	Occupational Hazards: My Time Governing in Iraq	Picador	Shortlist	
2007	John Stubbs	John Donne: The Reformed Soul	W. W. Norton & Company	Shortlist	
2008	Adam Foulds	The Truth About These Strange Times	Weidenfeld & Nicolson	Winner	
2008	Nikita Lalwani	Gifted	Viking	Shortlist	
2008	James McConnachie	The Book of Love: In Search of the Kamasutra Kama Sutra	Atlantic	Shortlist	
2008	Robert Mcfarlane	The Wild Places	Granta	Shortlist	
2009	Ross Raisin	God's Own Country	Viking	Winner	
2009	Adam Foulds	The Broken Word	Cape	Shortlist	
2009	Henry Hitchings	The Secret Life of Words: How English Became English	John Murray	Shortlist	
2009	Edward Hogan	Blackmoor	Pocket	Shortlist	
2010	No award made				
2011	No award made				
2012	No award made				
2013	No award made				
2014	No award made				
2015	Sarah Howe	Loop of Jade	Chatto & Windus	Winner	Sarah Waters, Andrew Holgate, Peter Kemp
2015	Ben Fergusson	The Spring of Kasper Meier	Little, Brown	Shortlist	Sarah Waters, Andrew Holgate, Peter Kemp
2015	Sunjeev Sahota	The Year of the Runaways	Picador	Shortlist	Sarah Waters, Andrew Holgate, Peter Kemp
2015	Sara Taylor	The Shore	William Heineman	Shortlist	Sarah Waters, Andrew Holgate, Peter Kemp
2016	Max Porter	Grief Is the Thing with Feathers	Faber & Faber	Winner	James Naughtie, Stella Tillyard, Andrew Holgate
2016	Jessie Greengrass	An Account of the Decline of the Great Auk According to One Who Saw It	John Murray Press	Shortlist	James Naughtie, Stella Tillyard, Andrew Holgate
2016	Andrew McMillan	Physical	Jonathan Cape	Shortlist	James Naughtie, Stella Tillyard, Andrew Holgate
2016	Benjamin Wood	The Ecliptic	Simon & Schuster	Shortlist	James Naughtie, Stella Tillyard, Andrew Holgate
2017	Sally Rooney	Conversations with Friends	Faber & Faber	Winner	Elif Shafak, Lucy Hughes-Hallett, Andrew Holgate
2017	Minoo Dinshaw	Outlandish Knight: The Byzantine Life of Steven Runciman	Penguin	Shortlist	Elif Shafak, Lucy Hughes-Hallett, Andrew Holgate
2017	Claire North	The End of the Day	Orbit	Shortlist	Elif Shafak, Lucy Hughes-Hallett, Andrew Holgate
2017	Julianne Pachico	The Lucky Ones	Faber & Faber	Shortlist	Elif Shafak, Lucy Hughes-Hallett, Andrew Holgate
2017	Sara Taylor	The Lauras	Windmill	Shortlist	Elif Shafak, Lucy Hughes-Hallett, Andrew Holgate
2018	Adam Weymouth	Kings of the Yukon: An Alaskan River Journey	Penguin	Winner	Kamila Shamsie, Susan Hill, Andrew Holgate
2018	Laura Freeman	The Reading Cure: How Books Restored My Appetite	Weidenfeld & Nicolson	Shortlist	Kamila Shamsie, Susan Hill, Andrew Holgate
2018	Imogen Hermes Gowar	The Mermaid and Mrs Hancock	Harvill Secker	Shortlist	Kamila Shamsie, Susan Hill, Andrew Holgate
2018	Fiona Mozley	Elmet	Hodder & Stoughton	Shortlist	Kamila Shamsie, Susan Hill, Andrew Holgate
2019	Raymond Antrobus	The Perseverance	Penned in the Margins	Winner	Kate Clanchy, Victoria Hislop, Andrew Holgate
2019	Julia Armfield	Salt Slow	Pan Macmillan	Shortlist	Kate Clanchy, Victoria Hislop, Andrew Holgate
2019	Yara Rodrigues Fowler	Stubborn Archivist	Fleet	Shortlist	Kate Clanchy, Victoria Hislop, Andrew Holgate
2019	Kim Sherwood	Testament	riverrun	Shortlist	Kate Clanchy, Victoria Hislop, Andrew Holgate
2020	Jay Bernard	Surge	Chatto & Windus	Winner	Sebastian Faulks, Tessa Hadley, Andrew Holgate
2020	Catherine Cho	Inferno: A Memoir	Bloomsbury Publishing	Shortlist	Sebastian Faulks, Tessa Hadley, Andrew Holgate
2020	Naoise Dolan	Exciting Times	Orion	Shortlist	Sebastian Faulks, Tessa Hadley, Andrew Holgate
2020	Seán Hewitt	Tongues of Fire		Shortlist	Sebastian Faulks, Tessa Hadley, Andrew Holgate
2020	Miriam Nash	Nightingale	Bloodaxe Books	Shortlist	Sebastian Faulks, Tessa Hadley, Andrew Holgate
2021	Cal Flyn	Islands of Abandonment		Winner	Tahmima Anam, Susan Hill, Andrew Holgate
2021	Anna Beecher	Here Comes the Miracle	Weidenfeld & Nicolson	Shortlist	Tahmima Anam, Susan Hill, Andrew Holgate
2021	Rachel Long	My Darling from the Lions	Picador	Shortlist	Tahmima Anam, Susan Hill, Andrew Holgate
2021	Caleb Azumah Nelson	Open Water	Viking	Shortlist	Tahmima Anam, Susan Hill, Andrew Holgate
2021	Megan Nolan	Acts of Desperation	Penguin Books	Shortlist	Tahmima Anam, Susan Hill, Andrew Holgate
2022	Tom Benn	Oxblood	Bloomsbury Publishing	Winner	Stig Abell, Mona Arshi, Oyinkan Braithwaite, Anne Enright, Francis Spufford, Johanna Thomas-Corr
2022	Lucy Burns	Larger Than an Orange	Penguin Books	Shortlist	Stig Abell, Mona Arshi, Oyinkan Braithwaite, Anne Enright, Francis Spufford, Johanna Thomas-Corr
2022	Maddie Mortimer	Maps of our Spectacular Bodies	Scribner	Shortlist	Stig Abell, Mona Arshi, Oyinkan Braithwaite, Anne Enright, Francis Spufford, Johanna Thomas-Corr
2022	Katherine Rundell	Super-Infinite	Macmillan	Shortlist	Stig Abell, Mona Arshi, Oyinkan Braithwaite, Anne Enright, Francis Spufford, Johanna Thomas-Corr
2023	Tom Crewe	The New Life	Simon & Schuster	Winner	Anne Enright, Mendez, James McConnachie, Daljit Nagra, Johanna Thomas-Corr, Catriona Ward
2023	Michael Magee	Close to Home	Farrar, Straus and Giroux	Shortlist	Anne Enright, Mendez, James McConnachie, Daljit Nagra, Johanna Thomas-Corr, Catriona Ward
2023	Noreen Masud	A Flat Place	Penguin Random House	Shortlist	Anne Enright, Mendez, James McConnachie, Daljit Nagra, Johanna Thomas-Corr, Catriona Ward
2023	Momtaza Mehri	Bad Diaspora Poems	Penguin Books	Shortlist	Anne Enright, Mendez, James McConnachie, Daljit Nagra, Johanna Thomas-Corr, Catriona Ward
2024	Harriet Baker	Rural Hours	Allen Lane	Winner	Claire Adam, Victoria Adukwei Bulley, Andrew Miller, Tomiwa Owolade, Johanna Thomas-Corr, Justin Webb
2024	Moses McKenzie	Fast by the Horns	Wildfire	Shortlist	Claire Adam, Victoria Adukwei Bulley, Andrew Miller, Tomiwa Owolade, Johanna Thomas-Corr, Justin Webb
2024	Scott Preston	The Borrowed Hills	John Murray	Shortlist	Claire Adam, Victoria Adukwei Bulley, Andrew Miller, Tomiwa Owolade, Johanna Thomas-Corr, Justin Webb
2024	Ralf Webb	Strange Relations	Sceptre	Shortlist	Claire Adam, Victoria Adukwei Bulley, Andrew Miller, Tomiwa Owolade, Johanna Thomas-Corr, Justin Webb
2025	Harry Shukman	Year of the Rat	Chatto & Windus	Winner	Caleb Femi, Esther Freud, Graham Norton, Johanna Thomas-Corr, Sathnam Sanghera, Lea Ypi
2025	Ben Brooks	The Greatest Possible Good	Scribner	Shortlist	Caleb Femi, Esther Freud, Graham Norton, Johanna Thomas-Corr, Sathnam Sanghera, Lea Ypi
2025	Gurnaik Johal	Saraswati	Serpent’s Tail	Shortlist	Caleb Femi, Esther Freud, Graham Norton, Johanna Thomas-Corr, Sathnam Sanghera, Lea Ypi
2025	Liadan Ní Chuinn	Every One Still Here	Granta	Shortlist	Caleb Femi, Esther Freud, Graham Norton, Johanna Thomas-Corr, Sathnam Sanghera, Lea Ypi

No award was made in 2002, 2005 or 2006.
