= Exciting Times =

2020 novel by Naoise Dolan

- US 1st edition
- Author: Naoise Dolan
- Language: English
- Set in: Hong Kong
- Publisher: W&N (UK); HarperCollins (US)
- Publication date: 12 April 2020 (UK); 2 June 2020 (US)
- Publication place: United Kingdom; United States
- Pages: 240 pp
- ISBN: 9781474613446 (1st ed. hardcover)
- OCLC: 1150786914
- Dewey Decimal: 823.92
- LC Class: PR6104.O49 E93 2020
- Followed by: The Happy Couple

Exciting Times is a novel by Irish author Naoise Dolan. It was released in the United Kingdom on 12 April 2020 by Weidenfeld & Nicolson, and later that summer in the United States. The book is Dolan's debut novel, an intimate exploration of a millennial teacher in Hong Kong who becomes entangled in a love triangle with a male banker and a female lawyer.

== Background and synopsis ==
Dolan began writing Exciting Times in 2017, when she was living in Hong Kong. She completed writing the novel in five months. An early excerpt was published in The Stinging Fly. The novel received critical acclaim, and was often likened to the work of Sally Rooney, a fellow Trinity College Dublin graduate.

== Publication ==
Exciting Times was published in the United Kingdom by Weidenfeld & Nicolson on 12 April 2020. It was released in the United States on 2 June 2020, by HarperCollins.

== Reception ==
The New York Times described it at as a novel where "jealousy and obsession, love and late capitalism, sex and the internet all come whirling together in a wry and bracing tale of class and privilege." Kirkus Reviews praised it as a "refreshingly wry and insightful debut." The Irish Times declared, "Exciting Times, which was acquired in a seven-way bidding war, more than lives up to the hype … It teems with insight around class, race, language and sexuality. Likely to fill the Sally-Rooney-shaped hole in many readers' lives."

== Awards and prizes ==
Exciting Times was longlisted for the Women's Prize for Fiction, Dylan Thomas Prize, and Desmond Elliott Prize, and shortlisted for the Irish Book Award, Dalkey Literary Award for Emerging Writer and Waterstones Book of the Year. Dolan was also shortlisted for the Sunday Times Young Writer of the Year Award in 2020.

Year	Award	Category	Result	Ref.
2020	Blackwell's Book of the Year	Debut Novel	Shortlisted	
2020	Irish Book Awards	Newcomer	Shortlisted	
2020	The Sunday Times Young Writer of the Year Award	—	Shortlisted	
2020	Waterstones Book of the Year	—	Shortlisted	
2021	British Book Awards	Début Book of the Year	Shortlisted	
2021	Dalkey Literary Award	Emerging Author	Shortlisted	
2021	Desmond Elliott Prize	—	Longlisted	
2021	Dylan Thomas Prize	—	Longlisted	
2021	Women's Prize for Fiction	—	Longlisted	

== Adaptation ==
In May 2020 it was announced that Exciting Times had been optioned for a US television series by Black Bear Pictures, and in August 2021 it was revealed that Cooper Raiff would adapt with Phoebe Dynevor to star in the adaptation and act as executive producer. The series will be produced by Amazon Studios.
