= Naoise Dolan =

Irish novelist

- Born: 14 April 1992 (age 34); Dublin, Ireland
- Education: Trinity College Dublin; Oxford University
- Occupation: Novelist
- Writing career
- Language: English
- Period: 2020–present
- Notable works: Exciting Times; The Happy Couple

Naoise Dolan (/ˈniːʃə/; born 14 April 1992) is an Irish novelist. She is known for her novels Exciting Times (2020) and The Happy Couple (2023).

== Life and education ==
Dolan was born and raised in Dublin, Ireland. Her father, Pat Dolan, is from Drumkeeran, County Leitrim, and she regularly visited her grandmother in the village during her childhood. Her mother, Miriam McNally, worked as a secondary school teacher. She experienced homophobic bullying in school. A college debater, she co-convened the Irish Mace competition in 2015/16. She obtained a degree in English from Trinity College Dublin in 2016 and later earned a master's degree in Victorian literature from Oxford University. Her desire to become a writer began while she was at Trinity College, inspired by her popularity as the writer and illustrator of humorous feminist cartoons published to her blog.

In 2016, after finishing university and being unable to find work in Ireland, she moved to Singapore to work as a TEFL teacher. Later that year, she moved to Hong Kong. She has also lived in Italy. She lived in London intermittently between 2018 and 2021. In the summer of 2022, she moved to Berlin and lived there for two and a half years, before accepting a writer in residency position in Dublin. Due to the climate crisis, she no longer travels by plane.

At age 27, Dolan was diagnosed with autism. She has discussed her diagnosis in interviews and on social media. She has also spoken about her struggles with depression. She is queer, and describes her sexuality as non-monogamous and polyamorous rather than bisexual or lesbian.

During the Gaza war, Dolan engaged in activism on behalf of Palestine, speaking at protests, signing open letters and petitions, fasting, and donating to campaigns. She supported Palestine Action and stated that she would continue to do so even after it was proscribed as a terrorist organization in the UK in July 2025. In October 2025, she joined the Gaza Freedom Flotilla, with the goal of breaking the blockade of the Gaza Strip and delivering humanitarian aid. Israeli forces intercepted the ship on which she was sailing and detained her and other flotilla members in Israel before deporting them to Jordan.

== Career ==
=== Exciting Times (2020) ===
Dolan began writing Exciting Times in 2017, when she was living in Hong Kong. She completed writing the novel in five months;it received critical acclaim, and was often likened to the work of Sally Rooney, a contemporary Trinity College Dublin graduate. The novel follows a 22-year-old Dubliner, Ava, while she is teaching English in Hong Kong, and her relationships with Julian, an Oxford-educated banker, and Edith, a corporate lawyer from a wealthy Hong-Kong family. The New York Times described it at as a novel where "jealousy and obsession, love and late capitalism, sex and the internet all come whirling together in a wry and bracing tale of class and privilege."

Dolan was shortlisted for The Sunday Times Young Writer of the Year Award in 2020 and for the Dalkey Emerging Writer Award in 2021. In May 2020 it was announced that Exciting Times had been optioned for a US television series by Black Bear Pictures, and in August 2021, Phoebe Dynevor was announced to the star in the adaptation and act as executive producer, in a series to be produced by Amazon Studios.

=== The Happy Couple (2023) ===
In a March 2021 interview, Dolan stated that she was making edits on her second novel; this becameThe Happy Couple, released in the United Kingdom on 25 May 2023. The novel revolves around a couple dealing with their flawed relationship, days before their wedding, and told from different perspectives. The Guardian gave it a mostly positive review describing it as "funny and direct" while musing, "Dolan more often uses her wit simply to parcel out insights and provocations among her cast rather than using them to build personalities we really care about." In a positive review The Telegraph lauded Dolan's skill as a writer noting, "This book confirms her as an artful comic novelist with a distinctive signature style." The novel is "study not of love or romance but of the motivating force of self-delusion."

== Awards and recognition ==
Year	Work	Award	Category	Result	Ref
2020	Exciting Times	Blackwell's Book of the Year	Debut Novel	Shortlisted	
2020	Exciting Times	Irish Book Awards	Newcomer	Shortlisted	
2020	Exciting Times	The Sunday Times Young Writer of the Year Award	—	Shortlisted	
2020	Exciting Times	Waterstones Book of the Year	—	Shortlisted	
2021	Exciting Times	British Book Awards	Début Book of the Year	Shortlisted	
2021	Exciting Times	Dalkey Literary Award	Emerging Author	Shortlisted	
2021	Exciting Times	Desmond Elliott Prize	—	Longlisted	
2021	Exciting Times	Dylan Thomas Prize	—	Longlisted	
2021	Exciting Times	Women's Prize for Fiction	—	Longlisted	
2024	The Happy Couple	Kerry Group Irish Novel of the Year Award	—	Shortlisted	

== Published works ==
- —— (2020). Exciting Times. Orion Publishing. ISBN 9781474618908.
- —— (2023). The Happy Couple. HarperCollins. ISBN 9781474613521.
