= Year of the rat (disambiguation) =

Year of the rat refers to a year associated with the rat zodiac symbol in the Chinese calendar.

Year of the Rat may also refer to:

- Year of the Rat, Vietnam, 1972, a board wargame simulating the 1972 North Vietnamese offensive
- Year of the Rat (play), a play by Roy Smiles
- "The Year of the Rat" (Mighty Max), an episode of Mighty Max
- "Year of the Rat", a song by Badly Drawn Boy on the album One Plus One Is One
- "Year of the Rat", a song by The Whitlams on the album Little Cloud
- "Year of the Rat", a song by Tristania on the album Rubicon
- Year of the Rat (book) a 2025 book by Harry Shukman
- The Year of the Rat (short story), a short story by Chen Qiufan
