= Tom Crewe =

English novelist (born 1989)

- In a 2023 interview
- Born: 1989 (age 36–37); Middlesbrough, England
- Education: University of Cambridge
- Occupations: Author and historian
- Writing career
- Notable work: The New Life (2023)
- Notable awards: Sunday Times Young Writer of the Year Award (2023)
- Website: tomcrewe.com

Tom Crewe (born 1989) is an English novelist, best known for his 2023 debut novel, The New Life. In April 2023, Granta included Crewe on their "Best of Young British Novelists" list, an honour presented every ten years "to the twenty most significant British novelists under forty." The Observer included Crewe in their list of the ten best new novelists of 2023.

== Biography ==
Crewe was born in 1989 in Middlesbrough. He received a Doctor of Philosophy degree in nineteenth-century British history from the University of Cambridge. He has served as an editor at the London Review of Books since 2015. He has contributed to the London Review of Books, The Telegraph, and other major outlets.

His debut novel, The New Life, was published January 2023 by Chatto & Windus and Scribner. It was also published in French, German, Spanish, and Dutch. It won the 2023 Sunday Times Charlotte Aitken Young Writer of the Year Award and was shortlisted for the 2024 Walter Scott Prize.

== Awards ==
| Year | Work | Award | Category | Result | Ref |
|---|---|---|---|---|---|
| 2023 | The New Life | HWA Crown Awards | Debut | Longlisted | |
| 2023 | The New Life | Nero Book Awards | Debut Fiction | Shortlisted | |
| 2023 | The New Life | Orwell Prize | Political Fiction | Won | |
| 2023 | The New Life | Polari Prize | First Book | Shortlisted | |
| 2023 | The New Life | South Bank Sky Arts Awards | Literature | Won | |
| 2023 | The New Life | Sunday Times Young Writer of the Year Award | — | Won | |
| 2024 | The New Life | Betty Trask Prize and Awards | Betty Trask Prize | Won | |
| 2024 | The New Life | Walter Scott Prize | — | Shortlisted | |

== Publications ==
- —— (2023). The New Life (US hardcover 1st ed.). New York: Charles Scribner's Sons. ISBN 9781668000830.
