= Catherine Merriman =

British writer (born 1949)

- Born: 1949 (age 76–77); London, England
- Education: University of Kent at Canterbury
- Occupations: Novelist, short-story writer and editor

Catherine A. Merriman (born 1949) is a British novelist, short-story writer and editor who has published five novels and three short-story collections. Her work often addresses the experiences of women. Her first novel, Leaving the Light On (1992), won the Ruth Hadden Memorial Award; her other works include the novels Fatal Observations (1993) and State of Desire (1996); the short-story collections Silly Mothers (1991), shortlisted for the Wales Book of the Year, and Getting a Life (2001); and the edited collection Laughing, Not Laughing: Women Writing on 'My Experience of Sex' (2004), which won an Erotic Award. Born in London, she has lived in Wales since 1973, and is often considered to be a Welsh author.

== Biography ==
Catherine Merriman was born in 1949 in London, England, where she spent her childhood. Her parents both worked in psychiatry and psychoanalysis. She attended the University of Kent at Canterbury. She moved to Abergavenny with her husband in 1973, and has remained in South East Wales; in 1994 she was living in Brynmawr, Gwent. She said in an interview in around 2000 that she considers herself both English and Welsh, commenting: "I think living in no man's land is quite a good place for a writer. You can see in both directions."

Before becoming a writer, she worked as a statistician and a Women's Studies lecturer, and spent eleven years as a volunteer for the charity Women's Aid in Abergavenny. She started writing in 1985, after leaving work to raise her two children.

Merriman taught writing for ten years at the University of Glamorgan (now part of the University of South Wales). She is a fellow of the Welsh Academy and co-chaired their members' committee. She has judged short-story competitions.

== Writing ==
Merriman has published five novels and three short-story collections (as of 2008). Her writing often addresses women's experiences. Diana Wallace classes her in a group of Welsh women fiction authors writing after 1968 whose work in some way tackles the "changes brought by feminism", together with Glenda Beagan, Alice Thomas Ellis, Siân James, Mary Jones, Clare Morgan and Bernice Rubens. Merriman was one of seven Welsh women authors to be included in Linden Peach's 2007 book, Contemporary Irish and Welsh Women's Fiction: Gender, Desire and Power; Peach comments that "her career as a writer is inseparable from Wales".

=== Novels ===
Leaving the Light On won the Ruth Hadden Memorial Award for first novels in 1992. Merriman states that it focuses on domestic power and has its foundation in her experience volunteering for the charity Women's Aid. Lucasta Miller, in a review for The Times, praises the novel's "tact and sensitivity" in handling a "sad, convincing" plot. A later review for the same newspaper describes it as an "observant first novel", whose "sinister" atmosphere is enhanced by its "determinedly unromantic" seaside setting. Max Davidson, in a short review of the paperback edition for The Daily Telegraph, describes it as "One of the strongest first novels of recent years". David Robson, in a mixed review for The Sunday Telegraph, calls the novel a "highly assured début" which is "sharply observed"; he praises the beginning, but notes that the symmetrical set-up slows down the plot, leading to "too much navel-watching and not enough action."

In her second novel, Fatal Observations – which she has said also stems from her Women's Aid experience – Merriman tackles the subject of domestic violence. Peter Matthews, writing in The Observer, describes the novel as a "simple and sometimes simplistic" portrayal of urban violence, but within its limited perspective, "uncannily exact in conveying that mixture of fear, rage, nausea and shame that every embattled city-dweller feels". Robin Blake, in a broadly positive short review of the novel in The Independent, criticises the "too in-your-face...character analysis". A review for The Times characterises the theme as the relationship between the sexes, describing the story as evolving from "sharply funny" to an ending that is "very nasty indeed".

The protagonist of State of Desire, her third novel, is recently bereaved widow from South Wales who protests about opencast mining and has an affair with a much-younger man. The novel addresses reawakening sexuality after bereavement and also tackles environmental issues. Helen Dunmore, in a review for The Times, writes that "Merriman creates an atmosphere of risk-taking sexuality and of desire without an ounce of romance in it." She praises the novel's depiction of the Welsh scenery "without sentimentality or caricature", noting parallels between the widowed protagonist's changed life and the threat that mining poses to the landscape. Davidson, in a short review for The Telegraph, praises the novel's "crisp writing, sharp dialogue and shrewd characterisation", and describes parts as having "real pathos". The academic Jane Aaron comments that the novel depicts a woman appealing to "traditional Welsh values of community and respect for nature" to fight for modern environmental causes. Stephen Knight assesses State of Desire within the tradition of industrial novels; he comments that it envisages a "modern world where women can resist modern industrial blight" and that the "commitment and resistance of the industrial novel can continue in the present." State of Desire has also been noted as an early example of a Welsh novel that features a minor character who is lesbian.

Her next novel, Broken Glass, depicts a relationship disrupted by the diagnosis of cancer. A review in the Liverpool Echo describes it as "[h]arrowing and heartening by turns".

=== Short stories ===
Merriman's first collection of stories, Silly Mothers, was shortlisted for 1992 Wales Book of the Year, and her short fiction has twice won a Rhys Davies short-story award, in 1991 and 1998. Her stories have appeared in anthologies, including The Second Penguin Book of Welsh Short Stories (1994) and the Library of Wales' Story II (2014), and many have been broadcast on BBC Radio 4.

Linden Peach includes Merriman in a list of twenty-two "key" 20th-century women writers of short fiction in English. Her short-story collections, together with those of the other Welsh authors Leonora Brito, Clare Morgan, Siân James and Glenda Beagan, have been described by Michelle Deininger as having "changed the direction of the form further, exploring issues such as race, female identity, ageing, and Welsh-language learning." Jude Brigley suggests her collection "Silly Mothers" as a text for teaching creative writing.

Peach analyses her short stories and particularly her third collection, Getting a Life (2001), in the context of a trope he terms the "blind spot", a "space of danger outside of what is normally in our field of vision", covering perceived threat or actual potential for violence ("Eating Sugar", "One Step Away from Trouble") as well as real violence ("Delivery"), and compares her with the Irish author, Mary Morrissy. Malcolm Ballin characterises "Delivery" as a "characteristic example of south Wales noir", describing the story as a "powerful piece that maintains suspense right to the end." Andy Beckett describes "Barbecue", Merriman's contribution to the Penguin anthology, as "contemporary picaresque" and compares it with the work of the Scottish author, Duncan McLean. David Lloyd considers Merriman's "One Day" among the highlights of the anthology Mama's Baby (Papa's Maybe) & Other Stories: New Welsh Short Fiction (1999), commenting that its "language sparkles and delights".

=== Editor ===
For several years Merriman was the fiction editor of the New Welsh Review. She edited Laughing, Not Laughing: Women Writing on 'My Experience of Sex', an anthology of Welsh women writing frankly about their sexual experiences, which won the publications category of the 2004 Erotic Awards. Merriman said in an interview that "All I wanted was honesty, for women to try and express on paper their experiences of sex, good or bad" and that she was surprised at the range of stories she received, commenting that "A lot of women clearly feel very separate and alone in their sexual lives."

== Publications ==
=== Novels ===
- Leaving the Light On (Weidenfeld & Nicolson; 1992)
- Fatal Observations (Weidenfeld & Nicolson; 1993)
- State of Desire (Pan Macmillan; 1996)
- Broken Glass (Pan; 1998)
- Brotherhood (Parthian; 2003)

=== Short story collections ===
- Silly Mothers (Honno; 1991)
- Of Sons and Stars (Honno; 1997)
- Getting a Life (Honno; 2001)

=== Editor ===
- Laughing, Not Laughing: Women Writing on 'My Experience of Sex' (Honno; 2004)
