= The New Life (Crewe novel) =

2023 historical novel by Tom Crewe

- Author: Tom Crewe
- Language: English
- Subject: LGBT studies
- Genre: Historical fiction
- Publisher: Simon & Schuster
- Publication date: 3 January 2023 (Hardcover first edition)
- Pages: 400
- Awards: Orwell Prize—Fiction (2023); Sky Arts Awards—Lit (2023); Sunday Times Writer (2023); Betty Trask Prize (2024)
- ISBN: 9781668000830
- Website: Simon & Schuster page

The New Life is the 2023 debut novel of British writer Tom Crewe. It is a work of historical fiction set in 1890s London and tells the story of two men collaborating on a study favouring civil rights for what were then called "sexual inverts" and now as the gay community. The work is a historical imagining of LGBT rights before the late 20th century gay rights movement. It has been translated and published in French, Dutch, German, Spanish and Italian.

The novel received widespread critical acclaim, and won the 2023 Orwell Prize for Political Fiction.

== Inspiration ==
The New Life was inspired by "the true story of John Addington Symonds and Henry Havelock Ellis, who worked together on one of the first medical texts about human sexuality," Sexual Inversion. While discussing the book's inspiration with Shelf Awareness, Crewe explained that, approximately a decade before The New Life was published, he had "read Phyllis Grosskurth's 1964 biography of John Addington Symonds and became interested in the aspects of the 19th-century gay experience" and later "realized that the early 1890s were actually an optimistic time for people like Symonds." This realization sparked his interest in writing a novel based on that optimism, as well as how the downfall of Oscar Wilde impacted it. In the interview, Crewe also explained, "The Society of the New Life is my alternative-universe version of the Fellowship of the New Life, a late-Victorian group which believed that progressive social change would best come through the improvement of individual character. Members of the Fellowship would lead selfless, non-materialistic, co-operative lives--and that way inspire others." Beyond mirroring the Fellowship, Crewe hoped to highlight the idea of "new life" in his novel: "the dream of a fresh start, a better and truer way of being in the world."

== Critical reception ==
The New Life was well-received by critics, including a starred review from Kirkus Reviews, which referred to the novel as "a smart, sensual debut," saying, "Crewe has his own rich and engrossing style ..., and his own approach to plot dynamics, concluding the story with a dramatic trial sequence that captures a mood of both frustration and defiance, blending the graceful ambiguity of literary fiction with the deftness of a page-turner."

Peter Kispert, writing for The New York Times Book Review, described the plot as "intricate and finely crafted," explaining, "[Crewe] attentively constructs rich, human motivations and contradictions for his fictionalized renderings of John and Henry ... Crewe uses the interior depth of John and Henry to build intrigue, creating provocative developments even without the use of overtly dramatic plot points."

Reviewers often highlighted Crewe's approach to alternate history, commenting on how his background as a historian helped the novel. The Guardian's Lara Fiegel states, "The New Life is one of the most embodied historical novels I have read." The Washington Post's Hamilton Cain highlighted how the novel "lends a contemporary urgency to an exploration of same-sex intimacy and social opprobrium," and notes the "troubling implications" the novel has "for our own reactionary era ... Crewe keeps one eye on the past and the other on the future; his book brims with élan and feeling, an ode to eros and a lost world, and a warning about the dangers ahead." The New Yorker's Nikhil Krishnan also discussed how Crewe intermingles modernity into this period piece, stating, "The element of 'alternate history' is all the more potent for its subtlety. Crewe is not trying, wishfully, to give his characters the happy endings they were denied in life ... Their acute awareness of being born too early for happiness is what gives Crewe's characters their poignancy." Booklist's Stephen Sposato refers to The New Life as a "potent drama [that] illuminates an origin story of the early gay rights movement."

Multiple reviewers commented on Crewe's writing style. The Boston Globe's Michael Schaub said the writing is "nothing less than remarkable," explaining that the "writing is subtly intricate, gorgeous, though never precious or showy." Peter Kispert, writing for The New York Times Book Review, describes the prose as "stylish and precise, reminiscent of Alan Hollinghurst's." Kispert noted, however, that the novel "falters ... in its later chapters, when John begins a self-destructive streak that is too flatly written to be believable," but concludes, "Otherwise, the writing is exquisite." The Washington Post's Hamilton Cain compared the novel to a "fine-cut gem, its sentences buffed to a gleam." James Cahill, writing for The Times Literary Supplement, called The New Life "atmospheric" and "compelling" for both its story and "stylistic flair." Cahill explained, "Crewe's taut prose is shot through with descriptive vividness," though "occasionally the measured quality of the writing induces the desire for some kind of rupture, a break (however transient) into a different register."

The Times's John Maier provided a mixed review, stating "Crewe has a confident feeling for his historical moment — with its stifling norms, intellectual neuroses and crushing high-mindedness— and an atmosphere that's all the more impressively evoked since the principal drama of the age, Wilde's arrest and imprisonment, is kept off stage throughout." However, Maier noted, "The book more or less lacks a comic dimension ... Come the denouement, Crewe thrills a little too indulgently at the moral complexity of the situations he contrives for his characters. It is as if the complexity, rather than anything else, is the point; and once all the moral ambiguities have been thoroughly spelt out the book ends a little lamely."

== Awards ==
Year	Award	Category	Result	Ref
2023	HWA Crown Awards	Debut	Longlisted	
2023	Nero Book Awards	Debut Fiction	Shortlisted	
2023	Orwell Prize	Political Fiction	Won	
2023	Polari Prize	First Book	Shortlisted	
2023	South Bank Sky Arts Awards	Literature	Won	
2023	Sunday Times Young Writer of the Year Award	—	Won	
2024	Betty Trask Prize and Awards	Betty Trask Prize	Won	
2024	Walter Scott Prize	—	Shortlisted	

== See also ==
- LGBT rights in the United Kingdom
- Victorian morality § Homosexuality
