= Andrew Cowan (writer) =

English novelist

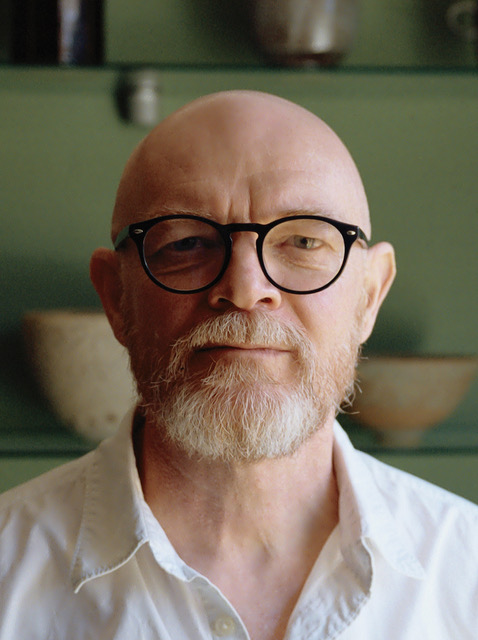
Andrew Cowan

Andrew Cowan (born 1960) is an English novelist and nonfiction author, who directed the creative writing programme at the University of East Anglia in 2008–18. His six novels include Pig (1994).

== Biography ==
Andrew Cowan was born in Corby, Northamptonshire, in 1960, and educated at Beanfield Comprehensive and the University of East Anglia (UEA). He graduated from UEA with a BA in English & American Studies in 1983 and an MA in creative writing in 1985. His teachers on the MA were Malcolm Bradbury and Angela Carter.

He was a tutor for the Arvon Foundation, and later the Royal Literary Fund Writing Fellow at UEA for three years. He was appointed to the UEA faculty in 2004, and was the director of the UEA Creative Writing programme in 2008–18; he was promoted to a chair in 2012. He retired in 2023.

He is also a potter.

== Writings ==
His first novel, Pig (1994), won a Betty Trask Award, the Sunday Times Young Writer of the Year Award, the Authors' Club First Novel Award, a Scottish Arts Council Book Award, the Ruth Hadden Memorial Award, and was shortlisted for five other literary awards. Common Ground (1996) and Crustaceans (2000) both received Arts Council bursaries. What I Know was the recipient of an Arts Council Writers' Award and was published in 2005. His fifth novel, Worthless Men, was published in 2013, and his sixth novel, Your Fault, in 2019.

His creative writing guidebook, The Art of Writing Fiction, was published in 2011, with a revised edition appearing in 2023. His monograph Against Creative Writing was published in 2022.
