= Sarah Howe =

British poet (born 1983)

Sarah Howe FRSL
- Howe in 2024
- Born: 1983 (age 42–43); Hong Kong
- Education: Christ's College, Cambridge
- Occupations: Poet, editor and researcher
- Notable work: Loop of Jade (2015)
- Awards: T. S. Eliot Prize; Sunday Times / Peters Fraser + Dunlop Young Writer of The Year Award; Forward Prize for Best Collection

Sarah Howe FRSL (born 1983) is a British Chinese poet, editor and researcher in English literature. Her first full poetry collection, Loop of Jade (2015), won the T. S. Eliot Prize and the Sunday Times / Peters Fraser + Dunlop Young Writer of The Year Award. It is the first time that the T. S. Eliot Prize has been given to a debut collection. She is currently a Leverhulme Fellow in English at University College London, as well as a trustee of The Griffin Trust for Excellence in Poetry. In 2026, Sarah Howe's Foretokens won the Forward Prize for Best Collection.

== Biography ==
Howe was born in 1983 in Hong Kong. Her father is English; her mother was born in China, but left the country in 1949 for Hong Kong. The family moved to the UK in 1991, when Howe was aged seven. Her first degree was in English at Christ's College, Cambridge, matriculating in 2001. She subsequently gained a PhD at that college; her thesis is entitled "Literature and the Visual Imagination in Renaissance England, 1580–1620". During her studies, she spent a year at Harvard University, with a Kennedy Scholarship; it was there that she began to write poetry seriously at the age of around 21.

She spent five years as a research fellow at the Faculty of English and Gonville and Caius College, Cambridge, until 2015. Her research there was in the area of 16th- and 17th-century English literature; her interests included relationships between poetry and visual art forms, including sculpture and architecture. In 2014, Howe founded the online poetry journal Prac Crit, and she continues to serve as one of its editors.

In 2015–16, she was the Frieda L. Miller Fellow at the Radcliffe Institute for Advanced Study of Harvard University, where she focused on writing poetry. She is one of the judges of the 2015 National Poetry Competition of The Poetry Society.

== Poetry ==
Howe's first poetry chapbook or pamphlet, A Certain Chinese Encyclopedia, was published by Tall Lighthouse in 2009. It won a 2010 Eric Gregory Trust Fund Award for poets under 30. Howe was selected for The Complete Works mentoring programme in 2012.

Her first collection, Loop of Jade, was published by Chatto & Windus in 2015. It explores Howe's British and Chinese heritage, and in particular her mother's history as an abandoned female baby in China. The main sequence of poems is inspired by Jorge Luis Borges's fictional encyclopedia, The Celestial Emporium of Benevolent Knowledge.

Loop of Jade won the 2015 T. S. Eliot Prize – the first time this award has been given to a debut collection – as well as the 2015 Sunday Times / Peters Fraser + Dunlop Young Writer of The Year Award. It was also shortlisted for the Forward Prize for Best First Collection. T. S. Eliot Prize chair Pascale Petit described it as "absolutely amazing" and predicted that Howe's creative use of form would "change British poetry." Andrew Holgate, literary editor of The Sunday Times, called the collection as "a work of astonishing originality, depth and scope."

As of 2015–16, Howe was working on a sequence called Two Systems, which examines China's interaction with the West and the recent history of Hong Kong, in particular the pro-democracy Umbrella Movement. The work used techniques that included the incorporation of found documents, such as the constitution of Hong Kong, reworked by erasing material. However, she abandoned the project before 2019.

Howe's poetry has appeared in several anthologies, including three editions of The Best British Poetry (Salt), Dear World & Everyone in It: New Poetry in the UK (Bloodaxe; 2013) and Ten: The New Wave (Bloodaxe; 2014). Her sonnet "Relativity", commissioned for the 2015 National Poetry Day, was recorded by physicist Stephen Hawking, also a fellow of Gonville and Caius College. His book A Brief History of Time had inspired Howe as a teenager.

In June 2018 Howe was elected Fellow of the Royal Society of Literature in its "40 Under 40" initiative.

In 2025, Howe's collection Foretokens was shortlisted for the T. S. Eliot Prize. It won the 2026 Forward Prize for Best Collection.

== List of major works ==
- Foretokens (2025)
- Loop of Jade (2015)
