= Ben Fergusson =

British writer (born 1980)

Ben Richard Fergusson (born 12 July 1980 in Southampton) is a British writer and translator. He studied English Literature at Warwick University and Modern Languages at Bristol University. Before publishing his first novel he worked for ten years as an editor and publisher in the art world. Fergusson lives with his husband and son in Berlin, where he teaches at the University of Potsdam.

== Career ==
Fergusson's debut novel was The Spring of Kasper Meier (2014), a literary thriller set in the ruins of post-war Berlin. In 2015, it won the Betty Trask Award, the HWA Debut Crown, and was shortlisted for the Sunday Times Young Writer of the Year Award. The Spring of Kasper Meier was the first novel in a trilogy of books set in the same apartment block in Berlin at different points in the city's twentieth century history. His second novel, The Other Hoffmann Sister (2017), is partly set in German South West Africa, now Namibia, and Berlin during the German Revolution of 1918–1919. An Honest Man (2019), the final book in the trilogy, is a queer Cold War thriller set in West Berlin during the summer before the Fall of the Berlin Wall. The latter was a book of the year in The Times, the Financial Times, and the Times Literary Supplement.

After same-sex marriage in Germany was passed by the Bundestag in 2017, Fergusson and his German husband became one of the first same-sex married couples to adopt in the country. In 2022, Fergusson published his first work of non-fiction about this journey, Tales from the Fatherland, which also reflected on the broader social and historical shifts in how families are created and what parenthood means.

== Bibliography ==
- The Spring of Kasper Meier (2014)
- The Other Hoffmann Sister (2017)
- An Honest Man (2019)
- Tales from the Fatherland (2022)

== Awards ==
- Seán O'Faoláin International Short Story Award 2020
- Stephen Spender Prize 2020 for poetry in translation
- Betty Trask Prize 2015
- HWA Debut Crown 2015
- Sunday Times Young Writer of the Year 2015 (shortlist)
- Authors' Club Best First Novel Award 2015 (longlist)
