= Honno (publisher) =

Women's publisher in Aberystwyth, Wales

- Founded: 1986
- Country of origin: United Kingdom
- Headquarters location: Aberystwyth
- Distribution: Turnaround Publisher Services
- Publication types: Books
- Official website: www.honno.co.uk

Honno is a Welsh women's press, based in Aberystwyth, which is run as an independent co-operative. The press concentrates solely on publishing writing by the women of Wales, with the twin aims of increasing publication opportunities for Welsh women and expanding the audience for Welsh women's writing. In 2006, Dai Smith, chair of the Arts Council of Wales, praised Honno's "terrific work in bringing women’s literature back into print". Luned Meredith, one of the founders, claimed in the press's 21st anniversary year of 2008 that Honno had made "a significant contribution to the changing social conscience which has given prominence to the woman's voice".

The press was started in 1986 by a group of volunteers, and had 400 shareholders within six months of its establishment. Honno has received financial support from the Welsh Books Council and the European Union. The name Honno is the Welsh feminine form of "that".

== Publications ==
The majority of titles are novels, autobiographies and short story anthologies in English; Honno also publishes some poetry, books for children and teenagers, and books in Welsh. The press's 450 authors include Lindsay Ashford, Anne Beale, Brenda Chamberlain, Gillian Clarke, Carol Ann Courtney, Amy Dillwyn, Dorothy Edwards, Menna Gallie, Juliet Greenwood, Mererid Hopwood, Siân James, Anne Lewis, Eiluned Lewis, Gwyneth Lewis, Catherine Merriman, Lynette Roberts, Kitty Sewell and Hilda Vaughan. The Honno's Classics series republishes books which have been out of print for many years.

== Awards ==
Awards won by Honno titles include the 1989 Wales Book of the Year for Morphine and Dolly Mixtures by Carol Ann Courtney, which was later made into a film for television. Luminous and Forlorn (1994), Honno's first short story anthology, won the Raymond Williams Prize of the Arts Council England. Who's Afraid of the Bwgan-wood? by Anne Lewis won the Welsh Books Council's Tir na n-Og Award for Best Children's Title in English in 1996. Not Singing Exactly by Siân James won the 1997 Wales Book of the Year. Honno books have also reached the shortlists of several recent awards, including the Theakston's Old Peculier Crime Novel of the Year Award 2006 for Lindsay Ashford's Strange Blood; and the Wales Book of the Year 2006 and Crime Writers' Association New Blood Dagger 2006 for Kitty Sewell's Ice Trap.
