= Lindsay Ashford =

British writer

- Born: 23 January 1959 (age 67); Wolverhampton, England, U.K.
- Education: Sheffield University (B.A); Queens' College, Cambridge
- Occupations: Author, novelist, writer

Lindsay Ashford is a British crime novelist and journalist. Her style of writing has been compared to that of Vivien Armstrong, Linda Fairstein and Frances Fyfield. Many of her books follow the character of Megan Rhys, an investigative psychologist.

== Early life and education ==
Raised in Wolverhampton, Ashford became the first woman to graduate from Queens' College, Cambridge in its 550-year history. She gained a degree in criminology.

== Career ==
After university, Ashford was then employed as a reporter for the BBC before becoming a freelance journalist, writing for a number of national magazines and newspapers. In 1996, she took a crime writing course run by the Arvon Foundation. Her first book, Frozen, was published by Honno in 2003.

Strange Blood was shortlisted for the 2006 Theakston's Old Peculier Crime Novel of the Year Award. She wrote The Rubber Woman for the Quick Reads series in 2007.

Her historical mystery, The Mysterious Death of Miss Austen, was adapted for radio by Andrew Davies and Eileen Horne. It was broadcast on BBC Radio 4's Woman's Hour in February 2014.

Her novel, With Love and Crocodiles, was published independently on 4 November 2013, and was then revised and re-published in April 2015, under the title, "The Color of Secrets."

Her novel The Woman on the Orient Express, published in 2016, is a novel with a fictional version of Agatha Christie as its heroine.

Ashford currently lives on the Welsh coast near Aberystwyth.

== Bibliography ==
- Frozen, 2003, Honno
  - Also published in the United States, August, St Martin's Press
- Death Studies, June 2006, Honno
- The Rubber Woman, March 2007, Accent Press
- Strange Blood, July 2007, Honno
- The Killer Inside, March 2008, Honno
- The Mysterious Death of Miss Austen, October 2011, Honno
- With Love and Crocodiles, November 2013, CreateSpace, revised and published as "The Color of Secrets", April 2015, Lake Union Publishing
- The Woman on the Orient Express, September 2016, Lake Union Publishing ISBN 978-1503938120

=== As contributor ===
- Written in Blood – A Honno Crime Anthology, February 2009, Honno
