= Loop of Jade =

2015 book of poetry by Sarah Howe

- First edition
- Author: Sarah Howe
- Language: English
- Subject: Poetry > Subjects & Themes > General
- Genre: Poetry
- Publisher: Random House
- Publication date: 07/05/2015
- Pages: 80
- ISBN: 9781448190683
- Preceded by: A Certain Chinese Encyclopedia: Poetry

Loop of Jade is the first book of poetry by Chinese-British poet Sarah Howe, and the first debut collection ever to win the T. S. Eliot Prize, in 2015. Also winning Howe the Sunday Times / Peters Fraser + Dunlop Young Writer of The Year Award, the collection contains poems that trace the author's journey into her own roots (her dual Chinese and English ethnicity), including poems about growing up in Hong Kong and about her mother.

== Reception ==
A review from The Scotsman:

"In her poem Sirens, Sarah Howe writes 'I had one of those blurrings – glitch, then focus – / like a put-off optician’s trip, when you realize / how long you’ve been seeing things wrongly.' This sinuous, shimmering, mirage-like debut collection is littered with such moments of sudden realisation, and also haunted by the suspicion that there must be more to everything than meets the eye." Roger Cox, 05/03/2015

The Guardian reviewed Loop of Jade as an amazing debut collection. Saying that the poet, Sarah Howe, combines her Chinese-British heritage along with her love for writing and the outcome is something both memorable and something we aren't used to. “'The twin lids / of the black lacquer box / open away', writes Howe in 'Mother's Jewellery Box': 'a moonlit lake / ghostly lotus leaves / unfurl in tiers // silver chains / careful o’s and a’s / in copperplate" This sets the tone early on in the poem and depending on the reader's taste can be seen as "graceful or, decorative and over-designed."
