= Kate Davies =

English novelist (born 1983)

- Born: 6 January 1983 (age 43)
- Education: University of Oxford
- Occupations: Novelist, children's writer and editor
- Years active: 2017–present
- Notable work: In the Deep End (2019)
- Awards: Polari Prize
- Website: katedavieswriter.com

Kate Davies (born 6 January 1983) is an English novelist, children's writer and editor. Her debut novel In the Deep End (2019) won the Polari Prize.

== Early life ==
Davies is donor conceived. She grew up in north-west London. She graduated from the University of Oxford.

== Career ==
Davies began her career working as a children's book editor. She penned a middle-grade trilogy called The Crims, described by Amanda MacGregor of Teen Librarian Toolbox as "The Addams Family meets Despicable Me". The first installment was published in 2017, followed by Down with the Crims in 2018 and The Crims at Sea in 2019.

Through a five-way auction in 2018, Borough Press acquired the rights to publish Davies' debut adult novel In the Deep End in 2019. The novel is inspired by Davies' own coming out experience in her 20s. In the Deep End won the Polari Prize for Book of the Year and was shortlisted for the Bollinger Everyman Wodehouse Prize.

In the interim, Davies wrote the children's picture book The Incredible Hotel, illustrated by Isabelle Follath. The book was published in 2020 via Frances Lincoln Children's Books and had a sequel titled A Mystery at the Incredible Hotel in 2023.

Davies reunited with the Borough Press for the publication of her second contemporary adult novel Nuclear Family in 2024. The novel is about twins who discover they were donor-conceived, following how the two sisters react to the news. Nuclear Family was named one of the best novels of 2024 by Johanna Thomas-Corr of The Sunday Times and a Good Housekeeping spring 2025 Good Books selection.

The Borough Press also acquired rights to publish Davies' first historical novel Good Books for Bad Children about the children's publishing industry.

She is a writing coach at The Novelry.

== Personal life ==
Davies came out as a lesbian in her mid-20s. She lives in East London with her wife and their son (born 2021).

== Bibliography ==
=== Novels ===
- In the Deep End (2019)
- Nuclear Family (2024)
- Good Books for Bad Children (TBA)

=== Children's books ===
==== The Crims ====
- The Crims (2017)
- Down with the Crims (2018)
- The Crims at Sea (2019)

==== The Incredible Hotel ====
- The Incredible Hotel (2020)
- A Mystery at the Incredible Hotel (2023)

== Accolades ==
Year	Award	Category	Title	Result	Ref.
2019	Bollinger Everyman Wodehouse Prize		In the Deep End	Shortlisted	
2020	Polari Prize	Book of the Year	In the Deep End	Won	
