= Tim Pears =

English novelist

Tim Pears (born 15 November 1956) is an English novelist. His novels explore social issues as they are processed through the dynamics of family relationships.

== Biography ==
Although born in Tunbridge Wells in Kent, Tim Pears grew up in the village of Trusham on the edge of Dartmoor where his father was the rector. He left school at sixteen and worked in a wide variety of jobs: farm labourer, nurse in a mental hospital, painter and decorator, college night porter and many others. He also made short films, and in 1993 graduated from the Direction course at the National Film and Television School. He wrote the script for a feature film, Loop, produced by Michael Riley at Sterling Pictures released in 1999.

He has had several features published in the Observer Sport Monthly magazine.

In a Land of Plenty was made into a ten-part drama series for the BBC by Sterling Pictures (with TalkBack Productions), broadcast in 2001.

Tim Pears was Writer in Residence at Cheltenham Festival of Literature, 2002–03, and Royal Literary Fund Fellow at Oxford Brookes University 2006-08 and 2011-12. He has been a Writer in Residence for First Story at Larkmead School in Abingdon, 2009-14. He has taught creative writing for the Arvon Foundation, Oxford University, and Ruskin College, among others. In 2013 he was elected a Fellow of the Royal Society of Literature.

He lives in Oxford with his wife Hania and two children.

== Bibliography ==
- In the Place of Fallen Leaves (1993) ISBN 0-7475-7836-2
- In a Land of Plenty (1997) ISBN 0-552-99718-8
- A Revolution of the Sun (2000) ISBN 0-552-99862-1
- Wake Up (2002) ISBN 0-7475-6153-2
- Blenheim Orchard (2007) ISBN 978-0-7475-8695-1
- Landed (2010) ISBN 978-0-434-02007-2
- Disputed Land (2011) ISBN 978-0-434-02081-2
- In the Light of Morning (2013) ISBN 978-0-434-02274-8
- The West Country Trilogy
  - The Horseman (2017) ISBN 978-1-4088-7687-9
  - The Wanderers (2018) ISBN 978-1-4088-9233-6
  - The Redeemed (2019) ISBN 978-1-5266-0103-2
- Run to the Western Shore (2023) ISBN 978-1-8007-5297-9

== Awards ==
- 1993 Ruth Hadden Memorial Award for In the Place of Fallen Leaves
- 1994 Hawthornden Prize for In the Place of Fallen Leaves
- 1996 Lannan Literary Award (Fiction)
- 2011 Medical Journalists Association Book of the Year for Landed
- 2011 Ondaatje Prize short list for Landed
- 2012 International Dublin Literary Award short list for Landed
