= John McCullough (poet) =

English poet

John Steven McCullough
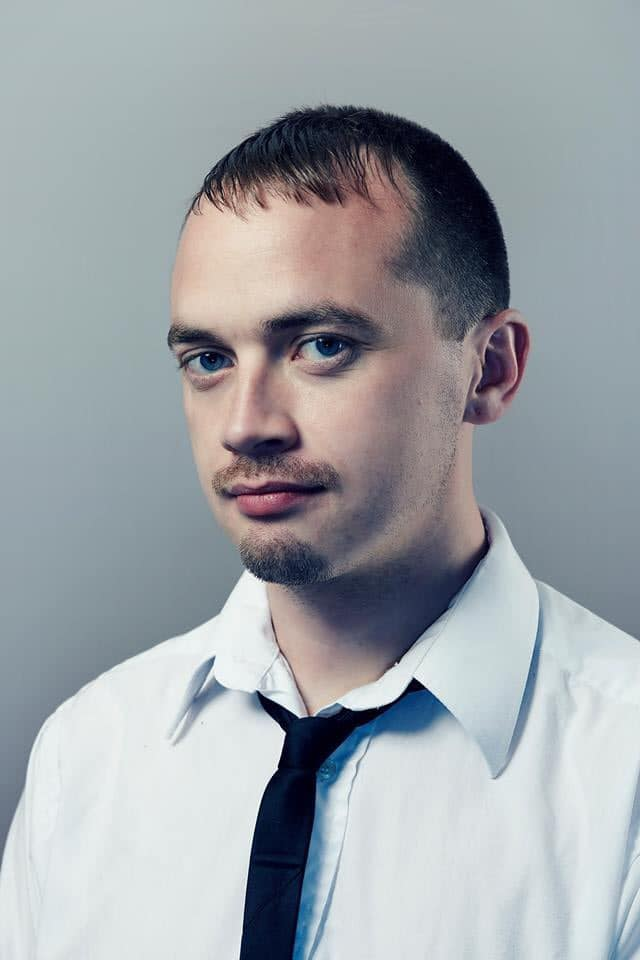
- Born: 1978 (age 47–48); Watford
- Education: University of East Anglia, University of Sussex
- Occupations: Poet, creative writing teacher
- Writing career
- Period: 2011–present
- Notable awards: Hawthornden Prize, Polari Prize

John Steven McCullough is an English poet. He is a tutor for the Arvon Foundation and has taught creative writing and English Literature at universities around the UK including the University of Sussex, the University of Brighton and the Open University.

The author of four books of poetry, McCullough was the winner of the 2020 Hawthornden Prize for Literature as well as the 2012 Polari First Book Prize. He was shortlisted for both the Costa Poetry Award (2019) and a Forward Prize (2021).

== Early life and education ==
McCullough was born in Watford and grew up in a working-class area. He later completed his Bachelor of Arts in English literature with creative writing at the University of East Anglia in 2000. He moved to Brighton and completed his Master of Arts in English literature at the University of Sussex in 2001 and his Ph.D. in 2005.

== Writing ==
McCullough's poetry uses surreal imagery to explore themes including sexuality, the body, history, mental health and class. His poems are typically set in urban environments. He is influenced by writers including Frank O'Hara, Elizabeth Bishop, Anne Carson, John Ashbery, Lee Harwood and Rosemary Tonks. His books have been published in the UK by Salt Publishing and Penned in the Margins.

The Frost Fairs, McCullough's first collection of poems, was published by Salt Publishing in 2011 and engages with queer history.

In 2016 Penned In The Margins published Spacecraft, a collection focussed on the idea of absence and emptiness as forces with creative effects. It includes a long sequence on the death of McCullough's first partner from an AIDS-related illness.

Penned In The Margins went on to publish Reckless Paper Birds in 2019, a collection which explores the vulnerability of the body, especially as it relates to queer identity and politics. Its poems are set in contemporary Brighton.

His 2022 collection, Panic Response, is a book about cultural and personal anxiety. Its poems include the long, Forward-shortlisted piece 'Flower of Sulphur', which draws on McCullough's Ph.D. research into rhetoric and friendship in Renaissance England.

== Works ==
- McCullough, John (2011-04-27). The Frost Fairs (1st ed.). UK: Salt Publishing. ISBN 978-1844713981.
- McCullough, John (2016-05-02). Spacecraft (1st ed.). Newcastle upon Tyne: Penned in the Margins. ISBN 978-1-908058-36-2.
- McCullough, John (2019). Reckless Paper Birds (1st ed.). Newcastle upon Tyne: Penned in the Margins (published 2019-05-15). ISBN 978-1-908058-63-8.
- McCullough, John (2022-03-15). Panic Response (1st ed.). Newcastle upon Tyne: Penned in the Margins. ISBN 978-1-913850-05-0.

== Awards ==
=== Winner ===
- 2012: Polari First Book Prize for The Frost Fairs
- 2020: Hawthornden Prize for Literature for Reckless Paper Birds

=== Shortlistings ===
- 2017: Ledbury-Forte Prize for Spacecraft
- 2019: Costa Poetry Award for Reckless Paper Birds
- 2021: Forward Prize for Best Single Poem for 'Flower of Sulphur'
