= Harriet Baker (writer) =

English non-fiction writer (born 1991)

- Born: 1991 (age 34–35)
- Education: University of Oxford (BA); King's College London (MA); Queen Mary University of London (PhD)
- Years active: 2013–present
- Spouse: Michael Kalisch
- Children: 1
- Website: www.harrietbaker.com

Harriet Rachel J Baker (born 1991) is an English critic and biographer. For her debut book Rural Hours: The Country Lives of Virginia Woolf, Sylvia Townsend Warner and Rosamond Lehmann (2024), she won The Sunday Times Young Writer Award.

Baker is a Leverhulme Early Career Fellow of Cambridge University.

== Early life ==
Baker was born in south west London and grew up in Edmondthorpe, Leicestershire. Baker graduated from with a Bachelor of Arts (BA) in English from the University of Oxford in 2013 and a Master of Arts (MA) from King's College London in 2017. She completed a PhD at Queen Mary University of London in 2023.

== Career ==
From 2013, Baker regularly contributed art and literary criticism to the Financial Times, The Times Literary Supplement and Another Magazine.

The proposal for Baker's debut book Rural Hours: Interwar Female Writers, Landscape and Living won the Tony Lothian Prize. Via a four-way auction in 2021, Allen Lane (a Penguin Random House imprint) acquired the rights to publish the book in 2024 under the subtitle The Country Lives of Virginia Woolf, Sylvia Townsend Warner and Rosamond Lehmann. For Rural Hours, Baker won The Sunday Times Young Writer Award.

Baker will reunite with Allen Lane for the publication of her second book Intense Life.

== Personal life ==
Baker married Michael Kalisch, a lecturer at the University of Bristol. The couple have a son (born 2023).

== Bibliography ==
- Rural Hours: The Country Lives of Virginia Woolf, Sylvia Townsend Warner and Rosamond Lehmann (2024) ISBN 9780241540510
- Intense Life
