= Anna Beecher =

British writer (born 1988)

- Born: 1988 (age 37–38); London
- Website: www.annabeecher.com

Anna Beecher (born 1988) is a British writer, living in Charlottesville, Virginia, USA. She has written the books Here Comes the Miracle (2021) and We All Come Home Alive (2025).

== Early life ==
Beecher was born in London and raised in Buxton.

== Work ==
Here Comes the Miracle (2021) is a novel that depicts, in detail, a year from diagnosis to death of a terminal illness. It is partly inspired by events in Beecher's life. We All Come Home Alive (2025) is a memoir structured around these points of shock in her life: "being bullied at school, brushes with binge drinking and bulimia, various heartbreaks, a breakdown, a parent's illness, the loneliness of leaving family and friends to move continents." But, according to Stephanie Merritt writing in The Guardian, "the cumulative toll of these ruptures is so significant because they are satellites orbiting the central tragedy of her life – the death of her elder brother from cancer at the age of 25".

== Personal life ==
She lives in Charlottesville, Virginia, USA.

== Publications ==
- Here Comes the Miracle. London: Weidenfeld & Nicolson, 2021. ISBN 9781474610629.
- We All Come Home Alive. London: Weidenfeld & Nicolson, 2025. ISBN 978-1399608060.

== Awards ==
- 2018: Winner, Henfield Prize, Joseph F. McCrindle Foundation and the University of Virginia, for the short story "Factory". A $10,000 award.
- 2021: Shortlisted (of four), Sunday Times Young Writer of the Year Award, for Here Comes the Miracle
