= Bellies =

2023 novel by Nicola Dinan

- Author: Nicola Dinan
- Language: English
- Genre: Literary fiction
- Publisher: Doubleday; Hanover Square Press
- Publication date: 1 August 2023
- Publication place: England
- Pages: 368
- ISBN: 1-335-49088-4

Bellies is the 2023 debut novel of British-Malaysian writer Nicola Dinan. It won the 2024 Polari First Book Prize and was a finalist for that year's Lambda Literary Award for Transgender Fiction. Its audiobook edition was narrated by Nathaniel Curtis and Octavia Nyombi.

== Premise ==
Set in London, Bellies follows the story of Ming and Tom, two lovers who meet at a drag party, both dressed as women. Ming begins to transition and accept herself as a trans woman. Tom, a gay man, is less attracted to his partner as she transitions and Ming ends the relationship. Ming writes a play about the breakup, angering Tom.

== Themes ==
Bellies is told from the perspectives of Tom and Ming, beginning with Tom for the first four chapters. Dinan wrote irony and foreboding into the first chapter, visible to the reader but not to Tom. She "wanted to offer these initial chapters as grounds for contemplation once Ming reveals that she’s trans".

The novel focuses on the relationship between Tom and Ming as they grow up and learn more about themselves and how they relate to others. A main theme is the "unknowability of others", which Dinan states is a common theme through much of her work. She explains this unknowability as a combination of what one is unable to see and what one refuses to see.

Dinan stated that some of her biggest writing influences were Rachel Cusk and James Baldwin. She thought her works would be more directly compared to those by Bryan Washington, Brandon Taylor, and Torrey Peters, and felt grateful for their impact on the literary landscape. Reviewers have also compared the book to Sally Rooney's Normal People.

== Publication ==
Dinan began writing Bellies as a short story called "early morning single bed", which focused on the relationship between Tom and Ming, ending in a period of tension after Ming's transition. Although several journals accepted it for publication, Dinan did not publish the story because she felt it would be better written as a novel. She began writing the novel in August 2020, finishing the first draft in 2021. Dinan found an agent later that year and signed with a publisher in 2022. Bellies was published in 2023.

An audiobook was released with Harlequin Audio in 2023. Nathaniel Curtis voices Tom, and Octavia Nyombi, a trans actor, voices Ming. The audiobook is 12 hours long.

Dinan cited the Danish translation of Bellies, Maveskind, as the most beautiful book she owned. She explained that Danish books tended to be very expensive, and Maveskind was created from high quality materials as a result.

== Reception ==
Bellies won the 2024 Polari First Book Prize. It was also a finalist for the 2024 Lambda Literary Award for Transgender Fiction.

The novel was positively reviewed in The Guardian, The Times, and The Skinny. Bookpage gave the audiobook a starred review, praising Nicola Dinan's portrayal of young love and the characterization added by the voices of Nathaniel Curtis and Octavia Nyombi. AudioFile also praised the performances of Curtis and Nyombi.

Chris Power compares the work to Sally Rooney's Normal People for The Times, asserting that Dinan "wisely acknowledges the debt" by having a character mention Rooney during a fight over Ming's play. The Skinny's Patrick Sproull contests the comparison of Rooney and Dinan, arguing that "there is a specificity to Dinan's writing as a British trans author in her late twenties that you can't find anywhere else."

In December 2022, it was announced that Element Pictures plans to create an adaptation of the novel.
