= Dalkey Book Festival =

Annual Irish literature festival

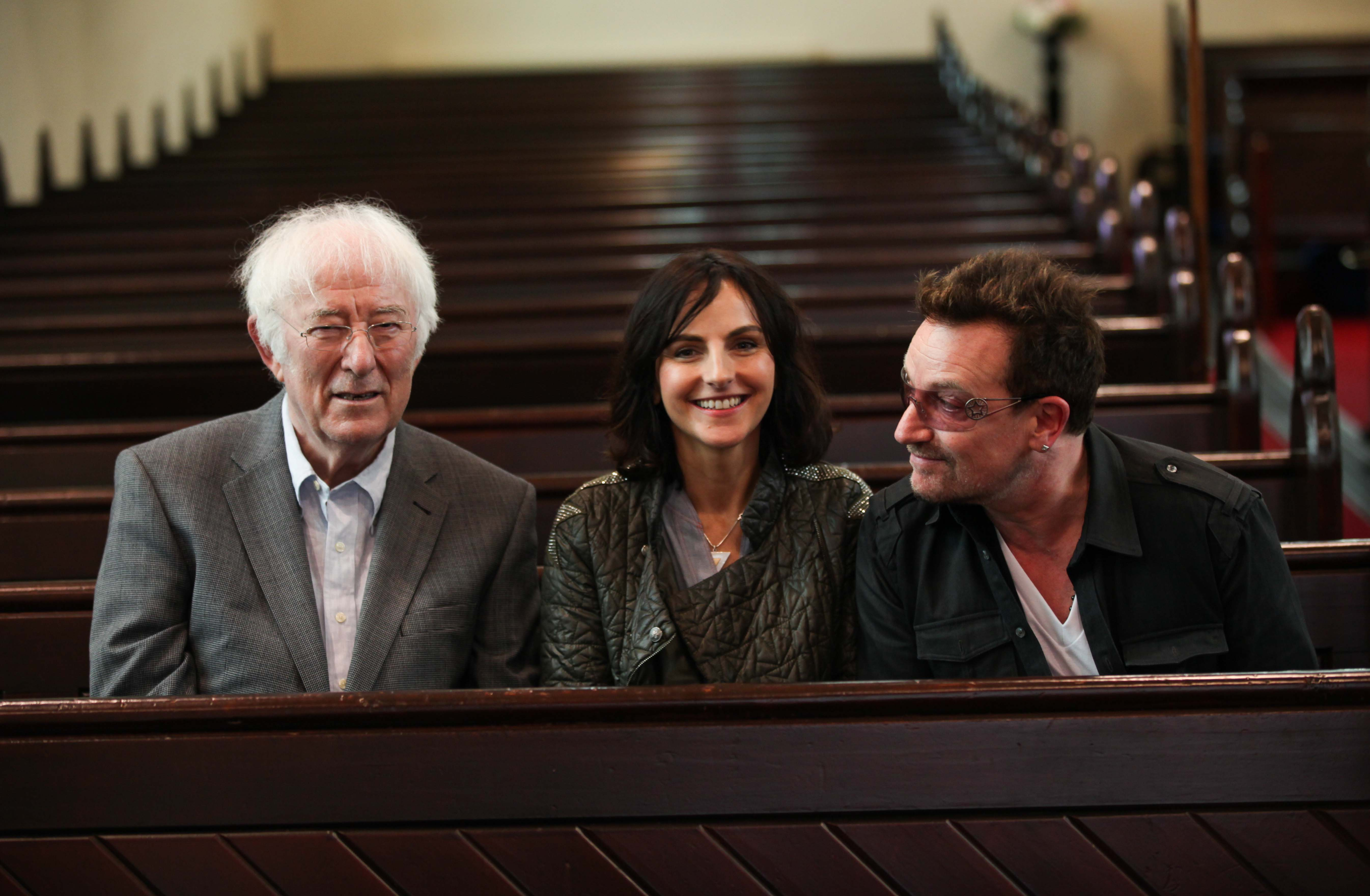
Seamus Heaney, Dalkey Book Festival director Sian Smyth, and Bono in St Patrick's Church of Ireland during the 2012 festival

The Dalkey Book Festival (/ˈdɔːki/ DAW-kee) is an annual literature festival held in Dalkey, County Dublin, Ireland, for four days in June. Since its inception in 2010 by Sian Smyth and David McWilliams, the festival has been held at a variety of venues in Dalkey, including Dalkey Castle, the local Town Hall, the Masonic Lodge, both churches, the local primary school, the medieval graveyard (where an Edgar Allan Poe adaptation was performed at midnight) and at various local cafes, bars and hostelries of the town. The compact nature of the town, its historic architecture and its location prompted the BBC's foreign correspondent John Simpson to call Dalkey "the loveliest little seaside town on Earth."

Although the festival started with a literary focus, it celebrates the arts in general, including theatre, film and comedy. It is also a festival of ideas, exploring the worlds of science, technology, current affairs, new politics and global trends.

== Timeline ==
The 2012 festival included writers Seamus Heaney, Joseph O'Connor, Maeve Binchy, Kevin Barry, Eoin MacNamee and Jennifer Johnston, historian Diarmuid Ferriter, comedians Barry Murphy, Gerry Stembridge and Pauline McLynn, and general speakers Declan Kiberd and Sinead Cusack.

The 2013 festival included writers Edna O'Brien, Anne Enright, Frank McGuinness, Donal Ryan, John Boyne, Eoin Colfer, Oisin McGann, comedians Colm O'Regan and Gary Cooke, and general speakers Carl Bernstein, Robert Fisk, Mike Scott and Dawn O'Porter.

The 2014 festival included writers Salman Rushdie, Amos Oz, Sebastian Barry, John Banville, Martina Devlin, Declan Hughes, comedians David O'Doherty, Eleanor Tiernan and Apres Match, actor Eamonn Morrissey, broadcasters Kirsty Wark, Andrea Catherwood, Sinéad Gleeson and Olivia O'Leary and general speakers Rory Sutherland, Bruce Katz, Gary Jermyn and Mark Blyth.

At the 2023 festival, Tom Hanks spoke about his debut novel. It also included Bono, Fintan O’Toole, Jan Carson and Sarah Webb.

At the 2024 festival, Bernie Sanders is expected to attend.

== Dalkey Book Festival 2026 ==
The 2026 festival features Booker Prize winners Salman Rushdie, Anne Enright, John Banville and Roddy Doyle, along with other writers such as John Boyne (The Boy in the Striped Pyjamas), Lionel Shriver (We Need to Talk About Kevin), Sebastian Faulks (Birdsong), Jeanine Cummins (American Dirt) and Prix Goncourt winner Jean-Baptiste Andrea. Comedians attending this year include David O'Doherty and Colm O'Regan. Inventor of the World Wide Web Tim Berners-Lee will also be speaking.

Journalists such as Ece Temelkuran, Bill Emmott, Jen Bray, Cullen Murphy, Philip Stephens, Fintan O'Toole, Pat Leahy, Mark Little, Jeremy Bowen and Sally Hayden are featured. Tech entrepreneurs Des Traynor (co-founder of Intercom) and Jimmy Wales (co-founder of Wikipedia) are attending. Economists such as David McWilliams, Mark Blyth and Sony Kapoor are participating.

Other acts include Nadya Tolokonnikova (Russian activist and co-founder of Pussy Riot), Oscar Winner Neil Jordan, artists Charlie Mackesy and Colin Davidson, author Lea Ypi (Free: Coming of Age at the End of History), Deborah Feldman (author of Unorthodox), historians Peter Frankopan (The Silk Roads), Donal Fallon (Come Here to Me) and Katja Hoyer (Beyond the Wall), Pulitzer Prize winner Hisham Matar and poet Doireann Ní Ghríofa.

== Dalkey Literary Awards ==
In 2020, the inaugural Dalkey Literary Awards were announced in advance of the festival of that year. The awards were in conjunction with the festivals long-standing sponsor; Zurich Ireland.

There were prizes for 'Novel of the Year' and 'Emerging Writer'. The prize fund for the competition is totaled at €30,000. The winner of the 'Novel of the Year' award will receive €20,000 and the winner of 'Emerging Writer' award will receive €10,000.

It was also awarded in 2021 and 2022.
