= Tony Lothian Prize =

Literary prize for biography

The Tony Lothian Prize is an annual literary prize presented by the London-based Biographers' Club to the best book proposal from a first-time biographer. Prize winners received £2,000.

In 2023, the Biographers' Club announced that the prize would be renamed the following year as the Elizabeth Buccleuch Prize to honor Elizabeth, Duchess of Buccleuch, who had died that year. The award had previously been named after her mother, Antonella Kerr, Marchioness of Lothian.

== Recipients ==
Prize winners and finalists
Year	Author	Title	Result	Ref.
2010	Matt Cox	White Lies, Black Magic: Prince Monolulu	Winner	
2011	Jane Gordon-Cumming	The American Heiress and the Scottish Rake: The True Story of the Royal Baccarat Scandal	Winner	
2012	Jane Willis	Marguerite, Byron and the Literary Factory	Winner	
2012	Carrie Chandler		Shortlist	
2013	Elaine Thornton	Amalia Beer: A Prussian-Jewish Life	Winner	
2014	Polly Clark	Thank You So Much for Writing	Winner	
2015	Francesca Wade	Square Haunting (Note: Square Haunting was published by Faber & Faber in 2020)	Winner	
2016	Sarah Watling	Noble Savages (Note: Noble Savages was published by Jonathan Cape in 2019)	Winner	
2016	Judy O’Kane	Thirst	Shortlist	
2016	Deborah Spring	A Woman of Ideas: Lady Anne Bacon 1528–1610	Shortlist	
2017	John Woolf	Queen Victoria's Freaks: The Performers at Buckingham Palace (Note: Queen Victoria's Freaks was published by Michael O’Mara Books in 2018 as Peerless Prodigies: Freaks, Circuses and the extraordinary World of P.T. Barnum)	Winner	
2017	Lin Rose Clark	The Boxing Parson of Killarney	Shortlist	
2017	Oli Hazzard	Enter a Cloud: A Book on/with/for/after W.S. Graham	Shortlist	
2017	Susan Kelly	Willibald’s Journey	Shortlist	
2017	Philip Ward	Every Other Inch a Gentleman: The Lives of Michael Arlen	Shortlist	
2018	Harriet Baker	Rural Hours: Interwar Female Writers, Landscape and Living	Winner	
2018	Susan Karen Burton	Gaijin: Modern Japan Through Western Eyes	Shortlist	
2018	Patrick Donovan	Who Killed Arnold Bennett? The Wife, the Mistress and Virginia Woolf	Shortlist	
2018	Susan Dunne	Parallel Lives: The Literary Friendship of Charlotte Bronte and Elizabeth Gaskell	Shortlist	
2018	Katharine Campbell	Behold the Dark Gray Man: The Life and Times of Sholto, Lord Douglas of Kirtleside	Shortlist	
2019	Tom Seymour Evans	The Canyons: Six British Exiles, Los Angeles and the Counterculture	Winner	
2019	Emma Bielecki	The Lives of Vidocq: From King of Thieves to Prince of Policemen	Shortlist	
2019	J S Casey	Isabel Rawsthorne: An Artist in Paris and Soho	Shortlist	
2019	Jay Prosser	Empire’s Loving Strangers: Journeys Through an Asian-Jewish Camphorwood Chest	Shortlist	
2019	Joe Stadolnik	The Unsettled Life of Duarte Brandao	Shortlist	
2019	Lois K. Yorke	The Life and Times of a Difficult Woman: Anna Harriette Leonowens (1831–1915).	Shortlist	
2020	Kate Crehan	But Will it Get a Laugh? The Life of Doris Hare in Three Acts (Note: But Will It Get a Laugh was published by the Society for Theatre Research)	Winner	
2020	Brad Bigelow	Failures: Six Ways to be Forgotten	Shortlist	
2020	Alex Grant	The Last Imposter: The Enigma of John Stonehouse	Shortlist	
2020	Gerry Harrison	Good Guy or Bad Guy: The Enigmas of Reggie Smith	Shortlist	
2020	Jayne Sharratt	Amabel Williams-Ellis and The Art of Being a Woman	Shortlist	
2020	Sophie Shorland	The Portingall Queen	Shortlist	
2021	Sarah Harkness	Alexander Macmillan, Advocate for the Ignorant:The Life and Times of a Victorian Publisher	Winner	
2021	Helen Bain	Court Green: Sylvia Plath in Devon 1961-2	Shortlist	
2021	Sharon Mather	Poets, Painters and Players: The Private Life of Edward Marsh	Shortlist	
2021	Amy Ripley	Passion and Power: The Life and Loves of Ann Fleming and Laura, Duchess of Marlborough	Shortlist	
2021	Jane Winter	All Things to All Men: The Fate of Rupert Brooke	Shortlist	
2021	Benjamin Wright	Centurion of the Inner Circle: The Secret Service of Ronnie Sinclair	Shortlist	
2022	Catherine Haig	An Unfinished Life: Lady Gwendolen Cecil (1860–1945)	Winner	
2022	Tara McEvoy	Padraic Fiacc: Poet of the Pagan City	Shortlist	
2022	Annette Rubery	The Female Rake: Peg Woffington’s Scandalous Life on the Georgian Stage	Shortlist	
2023	Andrew Kenrick	Juba--From Roman Slave to African King	Winner	
2023	Victoria Baena	A Sentimental Education: Amélie Bosquet, Gustave Flaubert, and the Writer’s Vocation in Nineteenth-Century France	Shortlist	
2023	Stephanie Genty	Bitter Strength: The Life and Work of Marilyn French, Feminist	Shortlist	
2023	Sue Laurence	Ada Chesterton: Fleet Street Bohemian and Adventurer	Shortlist	
2023	Andrew Moscrop	Upriver, after Fred: A Thames Journey	Shortlist	
2023	Matthew Zipf	Renata Adler: At the Radical Middle	Shortlist	
2026	David Warren	Sir Ernest Satow: A Victorian Diplomat and the Birth of Modern Japan	Winner	
2026	Lizzie Broadbent	Women Who Meant Business	Shortlist	
2026	Niamh Cullen	The Informer's Wife: An Irishwoman in the Italian Resistance	Shortlist	
2026	Elizabeth Schott	Useful and Beautiful: The Life of Dorothy Wright Liebes	Shortlist	
2026	Bob Stein	Mother and General: The Life and Legacy of Mary Ann Bickerdyke	Shortlist	
2026	Shelagh Weir	She Shall Have Music	Shortlist	
