= In the Place of Fallen Leaves =

1993 novel by Tim Pears

- First edition
- Author: Tim Pears
- Cover artist: Emma Parker
- Language: English
- Publisher: Hamish Hamilton (UK); Donald I Fine (US)
- Publication date: 1993 (UK), 1995 (US)
- Publication place: United Kingdom
- Media type: Print
- Pages: 320
- ISBN: 0-241-13322-X

In the Place of Fallen Leaves is Tim Pears's debut novel, published in 1993. It won the Ruth Hadden Memorial Award in 1993 and the Hawthornden Prize in 1994.

== Inspiration ==
On his website, Tim Pears reveals that the novel is set in the Devon village where he grew up (Trusham on the edge of Dartmoor) He had written many 'appalling' poems in his twenties then adapted one into a story; this liberated him and he never wrote another poem; just stories which eventually became this, his first novel. He cites his other influences as Gabriel García Márquez’s One Hundred Years of Solitude, Marc Chagall’s paintings of the Russian Pale, Mikhail Sholokhov’s tales of Don Cossacks, and New Zealander Vincent Ward’s film Vigil.

== Plot introduction ==
It is set in the long, hot summer of 1984 in an isolated Devon village on the edge of Dartmoor where thirteen-year-old Alison is growing up, the youngest member of a farming family. The story covers scenes from Alison's own life as well as those of her neighbours, siblings, parents and grandparents.

== Reception ==
- "By turns elegiac, moving and extremely funny, Pears is also unafraid to muscle up his formidable powers of Proustian evocation. An extraordinarily promising debut" - Time Out
- "Reminiscent of Faulkner and Garcia Marquez, the writing retains a very English scale ... A triumph ... Sensitive, heart-warming and hallucunatory." - Financial Times
- "In the Place of Fallen Leaves is more perfect than any first novel deserves to be." - The Observer
