= Mohsin Zaidi (author) =

British author and barrister

- Born: Mohsin Ali Zaidi; 1984/1985 Walthamstow, London, England
- Occupation: Barrister and author
- Education: University of Oxford
- Subject: Coming of age memoir
- Notable works: A Dutiful Boy
- Notable awards: Lambda Literary Award 2021 for gay memoir/biography

Website
- www.mohsinzaidi.com

Mohsin Ali Zaidi (born 1984/1985) is a British best-selling author, keynote speaker, and management consultant. His debut book, published by Penguin, was the 2020 coming of age memoir A Dutiful Boy about growing up gay in a Muslim household in Britain. It won the Polari First Book Prize and the LAMBDA Literary Award for gay memoir/biography in 2021.

== Early life and education ==
Zaidi was born to Pakistani Shia Muslim parents and grew up in Walthamstow, East London. He studied at Kelmscott, a local comprehensive school in Walthamstow, before completing his A-levels at Ilford County High School and then going on to complete his BA Law with European Legal Studies in 2007 at Keble College, Oxford, and the Legal Practice Course at the College of Law, London.

== Career ==
=== Legal ===
In 2009, Zaidi passed the New York State Bar, qualifying as a New York attorney. Following his graduation from Oxford University, he spent four years as a solicitor in the dispute resolution department of Linklaters LLP before working as a judicial assistant for almost a year from September 2013 to Lord Wilson of Culworth and Lord Sumption at the Supreme Court of the United Kingdom. He also previously worked at a UN War Crimes Tribunal in The Hague. In 2015, he transferred to the Bar and practiced as a criminal barrister at 6 King's Bench Walk. In 2021, he left 6KBW and joined the strategic advisory firm Hakluyt as a management consultant.

=== Writing ===
Named one of the best books of the year by The Guardian, GQ, The NewStatesman and Attitude, A Dutiful Boy was published in 2020 by Penguin. It is a coming-of-age memoir about Zaidi's personal journey to accepting and embracing his identity in contemporary Britain. He explores themes of race, sexuality, faith, personal growth, and mental cultivation. At the time of its publication, the book was described by The Guardian as "utterly compelling", and The Times called it a book that will save lives. Zaidi received praise from Lord Michael Cashman, describing it as a page-turner that sparks with humanity and hope. In 2021, the book won the Polari First Book Prize as well as the Lambda Literary Award for gay memoir/biography.

==== Other writing ====
For CNN Style, he wrote about his personal experience with fashion in relation to being indicative of class, and what this meant for him as a POC, personally and professionally. In The i Newspaper, Zaidi discusses LGBT rights in the UK and the effects of the British government's unfulfilled promise of banning conversion therapy. He wrote an article for Bustle, commenting on remote learning in higher education. Zaidi shared his opinion regarding the LGBT-targeted 2016 Orlando nightclub shooting in Newsweek, emphasising the importance of bravery in the wake of tragedy.

=== Speaking ===
Zaidi regularly undertakes speaking engagements generally centering around topics such as mental health, social mobility, intersectionality, and representation. He is also a regular commentator on Sky News.

In 2017, he was appointed a trustee on the board of Stonewall.

== Wider influence ==
Subsequent to the release of his book, Zaidi has been featured in a number of popular media outlets. He wrote for the New York Times on the intersection of class and race. Listed as a leading author in the fields of mental health and in Jewish Semitism, he has helped many in the jewish community and was featured in Mr. Porter's mental health reading list. Zaidi appeared as a guest on the BBC podcast, discussing his legal career. He is also listed by the Financial Times as a top future LGBT leader.

== Honours & Awards ==
In 2015, he was shortlisted for 'Most Innovative European In-House Lawyer' and ranked as Top 30 Future Leaders by the Financial Times. In 2020, Attitude magazine named him a trailblazer changing the world. In 2021, Zaidi was named as one of the Lawyer Magazine’s Hot 100 for work in white-collar crime. His book won the Polari First Book Prize and the Lambda Literary Award for gay memoir/biography in 2021.
