= Andrew Holgate =

British journalist and critic

Andrew James Headley Holgate (born 31 December 1958 in Reigate) is a British journalist and critic. He was literary editor of The Sunday Times from 2008 to 2022, having joined the paper as its deputy literary editor in 1999.

Holgate read Modern History at Durham University, graduating in 1981.

== Career ==
Holgate worked in bookselling and publishing before moving into literary journalism. He joined The Sunday Times as deputy literary editor in 1999 and became literary editor in 2008, a post he held until he stepped down in October 2022.

While literary editor he relaunched the Sunday Times Young Writer of the Year Award in 2015 and ran the Sunday Times Audible Short Story Award. He has also judged a number of literary prizes, including the Samuel Johnson Prize, and in 2021 he chaired the judging panel of the Baillie Gifford Prize for non-fiction.

After leaving the newspaper, Holgate became an affiliate agent at the literary agency Andrew Nurnberg Associates.

== Publications ==
With Honor Wilson-Fletcher, Holgate edited two essay collections published by Waterstone's:

- Holgate, Andrew; Wilson-Fletcher, Honor, eds. (1998). The Cost of Letters: A Survey of Literary Living Standards. Waterstone's. ISBN 978-0952740599.
- Holgate, Andrew; Wilson-Fletcher, Honor, eds. (1999). The Test of Time: What Makes a Classic a Classic?. Waterstone's & Arts Council of England. ISBN 978-1902603087.

== Honours ==
In 2020, Holgate was made an Honorary Fellow of the Royal Society of Literature (Hon FRSL) as part of the Society's bicentenary appointments.
