= Elean Thomas =

Jamaican poet, novelist, journalist and activist (1947–2004)

- Born: Elean Roslyn Thomas; 18 September 1947; St. Catherine, Colony of Jamaica, British Empire
- Died: 27 May 2004 (aged 56); Kingston, Jamaica
- Other name: Elean Thomas-Gifford
- Education: University of the West Indies; Goldsmiths College, London University
- Occupations: Poet, novelist, journalist, activist
- Notable work: The Last Room (1991)
- Spouse(s): Anthony Gifford, 1988–1998
- Awards: Ruth Hadden Memorial Award

Elean Roslyn Thomas (18 September 1947 – 27 May 2004) was a Jamaican poet, novelist, journalist and activist. She was active in the struggle for women's rights in the Caribbean and the movement for Jamaican national independence, as well as working in Latin America, Eastern and Western Europe and Africa. She was married (1988–1998) to human rights barrister Anthony Gifford.

== Biography ==
Elean Thomas was born in St. Catherine, Jamaica, to a health-worker mother and a father (Rt. Rev. David Thomas) who was a Pentecostal bishop.

She attended the University of the West Indies (UWI) in the late 1960s, reading politics and history, and did postgraduate work in communications at Goldsmiths College, London University.

In the 1970s, she was employed as a reporter by the Jamaica Gleaner, and was head of the editorial department of the Jamaica Information Service, as well as working with other small publications. She also served on the executive of the Press Association of Jamaica. In 1976, she was a founding member in Jamaica of the Committee of Women for Progress, championing such issues as maternity leave and equal pay. She also taught history and English in Jamaica, and co-founded the National Union of Democratic Teachers.

Alongside Trevor Munroe and others, she was a founder-member of the Workers Party of Jamaica (WPJ) and, as its international secretary, served on the editorial board of World Marxist Review, which was based in Prague, Czechoslovakia; as a consequence she travelled throughout Europe, while also building strong connections in South Africa.

In Jamaica, she campaigned against the 1983 US invasion of Grenada, and in 1984 invited English barrister Anthony Gifford to speak to a human rights committee she set up. They married in 1988, the marriage being dissolved in 1998.

Her first collection, Word Rhythms from the Life of a Woman, was published in 1986 by Karia Press. Although categorised as poetry, Brand herself said: "I call my pieces Word-Rhythms. I honestly believe it is pretentious to call them poems. They are merely word-sketches, word-photographs, word-drawings, word-paintings, word-beats." In 1988, Karia also published her second collection, Before They Can Speak of Flowers: Word Rhythms, which had a foreword by Ngũgĩ wa Thiong'o and an introduction by Benjamin Zephaniah.

Her novel, The Last Room, was published by Virago Press in 1991, winning the Ruth Hadden Memorial Award for best first novel published in Britain. Elean Thomas's work is anthologised in Daughters of Africa (1992), edited by Margaret Busby.

Elean Thomas died from cancer aged 56 at the Hope Institute in Kingston, Jamaica, on 27 May 2004.

== Bibliography ==
- Word Rhythms from the Life of a Woman, London: Karia Press, 1986. ISBN 978-0946918409
- Before They Can Speak Of Flowers: Word Rhythms, London: Karia Press, 1988. ISBN 978-0946918928
- The Last Room (novel), London: Virago Press, 1991. ISBN 978-1853813214
