= Nicola Dinan =

Malaysian-British writer

- Born: 15 March 1994 (age 32); British Hong Kong
- Education: University of Cambridge
- Occupation: Novelist
- Years active: 2020–present
- Notable work: Bellies (2023)
- Awards: Polari First Book Prize

Nicola Dinan (born 15 March 1994) is a British-Malaysian novelist. Her debut novel Bellies (2023) won the Polari First Book Prize.

== Early life ==
Dinan was born in British Hong Kong to a British father and a Malaysian Chinese mother and grew up between there and Kuala Lumpur, where she attended an international school. Dinan began her studies in Natural Sciences at the University of Cambridge, and "ended up specialising in the history and philosophy of science". She then pursued a law conversion and subsequently worked at a law firm reviewing contracts. While penning her debut novel, Dinan joined the Faber Academy's Writing a Novel workshop.

== Career ==
In March 2022, Doubleday won a nine-way auction to publish Dinan's debut novel Bellies in summer 2023. Starting the writing process in 2020, she had initially written Bellies as a short story titled "early morning single bed". Set in the late 2010s, the novel explores how its main character Ming's transition impacts her interpersonal relationships rather than portraying the process as "highly individual". Bellies was shortlisted for the 2021 Mo Siewcharran Prize, won the 2024 Polari First Book Prize and was a finalist for the 2024 Annual Lambda Literary Awards Transgender Fiction Prize.

In 2024, Dinan joined Royal Holloway, University of London as a tutor on the university's Creative Writing MA course. She reunited with Doubleday for the publication of her second novel Disappoint Me in 2025. Disappoint Me was a Service95 Book Club pick and won the inaugural New Adult Book Prize.

In 2025, Dinan was selected as a judge for the Polari Prize, but resigned in protest against the inclusion of trans-exclusionary activist John Boyne in the longlist.

Dinan is in the process of writing her third novel and first work of speculative fiction, set in 1987 Hong Kong.

== Adaptations ==
Ahead of its release, Element Pictures optioned the rights to adapt Bellies for television.

== Bibliography ==
=== Novels ===
- Bellies (2023)
- Disappoint Me (2025)

=== Other ===
- Essay in The Polyester Book of Bad Taste (2026) edited by Ione Gamble

== Accolades ==
- 2021 Mo Siewcharran Prize (shortlisted)
- 2024 Annual Lambda Literary Awards Transgender Fiction Prize (finalist)
- 2024 Polari First Book Prize
- 2025 New Adult Book Prize
