= Pig (novel) =

1994 novel by Andrew Cowan

- First edition cover with quote from Michael Dibdin
- Author: Andrew Cowan
- Language: English
- Publisher: Michael Joseph
- Publication date: 30 Aug 1994
- Publication place: United Kingdom
- Media type: Print
- Pages: 213
- ISBN: 0-718-13783-3

Pig, is the debut novel of English author Andrew Cowan. Published in 1994 it won the Sunday Times Young Writer of the Year Award, a Betty Trask Award, the Ruth Hadden Memorial Award, the Authors' Club Best First Novel Award and a Scottish Council Book Award, and was shortlisted for five other awards.

== Plot introduction ==
Pig is a coming-of-age story set in a bleak post-industrial English new town as told by 15 year-old narrator Danny. The eponymous pig is kept by Danny's grandparents in a run-down cottage, but when his grandmother dies and his grandfather is placed in a nursing home, Danny starts looking after the elderly pig. With his Indian girlfriend Surinder he creates a haven away from his racist neighbours and stifling family.

== Inspiration ==
The book took the author six years to write and commemorated his first girlfriend and his own grandfather. Its setting and context were based on the town of Corby where the author grew up. After many rejections from publishers Cowan sent off a manuscript to the Betty Trask Awards and won £7,000. Within days of winning the award Cowan received 12 letters from publishers interested in the book.

== Reception ==
- A solid, strong effort from a prize-winning Scottish-born writer who peers closely into the struggles of a sensitive boy as he tries to hold on to those things most precious to him....[A] small but excellent tale of contemporary English society." - Kirkus Reviews, 07/15/1996
- "Mostly, Mr. Cowan's prose is plain as a pikestaff, earnestly fixed on the physical world. But his minimalism is not of the frozen or portentous type....The author's dispassionate gaze carries with it great compassion....[T]he book is a coming-of-age story as strange and surprising, in its way, as The Catcher in the Rye. It is a novel about inarticulateness and confusion that could not itself be more direct and sure." - New York Times Book Review, 12/15/1996.
- "In sentence upon sentence of finely honed prose, Scottish-born Andrew Cowan meticulously creates a richly textured, thickly detailed portrait of a sensitive young man trying to salvage something of value from the fragments of a shattered world....'Pig' portrays the poignancy of its situation in loving, painstaking detail." - Los Angeles Times Book Review, 12/22/1996.
