= The Happy Couple =

2023 novel by Naoise Dolan

- Author: Naoise Dolan
- Language: English
- Publisher: W&N
- Publication date: 25 May 2023

The Happy Couple is a novel by Irish author Naoise Dolan. It was released on 25 May 2023. The book is Dolan's second novel, after Exciting Times (2020). It is a contemporary novel exploring an uncertain couple's (Celine and Luke) relationship and the days before their wedding.

== Synopsis ==
The novel is split into sections from people's different perspectives:

- The Bride (Celine)
- The Groom (Luke)
- The Best Man (Archie)
- The Guest (Vivian)

The ensemble novel depicts themes of love and marriage, fidelity and betrayal.

== Publication ==
The book was published by W&N on 25 May 2023 in the United Kingdom. It was published in the United States by HarperCollins on 7 November 2023.

== Reception ==
The novel has received positive reviews. The Guardian described it as "funny and direct" while musing, "Dolan more often uses her wit simply to parcel out insights and provocations among her cast rather than using them to build personalities we really care about." In a positive review, The Telegraph lauded Dolan's skill as a writer noting, "This book confirms her as an artful comic novelist with a distinctive signature style." Francesca Steele from i compared the book favorably as a blend of Jane Austen and Sally Rooney adding, "This is a funny and perceptive play on the traditional marriage plot that cements Dolan as one of the cleverest, most amusing new writers around."
