= Vanessa Lubach =

British artist

Vanessa Lubach is a British artist noted for her unusually intricate and many-layered prints using linseed oil inks, as well as for her paintings and her book illustrations. She lives and works in Norfolk.

== Training ==
Lubach grew up in rural Oxfordshire but graduated from the Brighton School of Art in 1990 with a BA (Hons) in graphic design and illustration.

== Technique ==
Lubach starts her wood block and linocut prints with a sketch based on careful observation. She then draws and carves the intricate main image onto the first ‘key’ block. She prints from this and then transfers the design to additional blocks, as many as there are individual colours in her composition. Some multi-layered designs contain twenty or more colours and may take up to a year to complete. Lubach uses a spoon as a burnisher. The linocuts are then printed using a Harry F Rochat Albion Press in her studio in Norwich.

== Content ==
In her painting and print making, Lubach often depicts quiet moments of domestic life which can include her cats, flowers from her garden, birds and also local wildlife and nature.

== Selected work ==
Helen with Geraniums is a lino print depicting a fluffy, ginger tabby cat with amber eyes, sitting on a windowsill, surrounded by pots of geraniums.

Rosie and Pumpkin is an oil painting on canvas. Lubach says her aim was “to convey the moment of quiet astonishment that followed the battle of wits necessary to catch the agile and evasive bantam.”

Lubach’s paintings and linocuts can be seen at print fairs, exhibitions in art galleries, group exhibitions in Norwich, and on the web site of The Society of Wood Engravers. In 2022, two of Lubach’s works were included in the traveling 84th Annual Exhibition of the Society of Wood Engravers, which was on view at the Sea Pictures Gallery in Suffolk. Her work can also be seen on fine art cards in retail outlets.

== Books ==
Lubach has illustrated editions of many classic novels including Frankenstein, Jane Eyre, Dracula and Wuthering Heights. She has also illustrated books about the natural world. Lubach illustrated the cover of Fiona Mozley's debut novel Elmet which was shortlisted for the Man Booker Prize in 2017.

== Awards ==
In 2012, her oil painting on canvas, Rosie and Pumpkin, was a showcase portrait at the BP Portrait Awards held at the National Portrait Gallery in London, England. It was the main publicity image for the award that year.

== Private life ==
Lubach lives with her husband Peter Lubach, a ceramicist, printmaker and illustrator, their three children and the animals which often appear as subjects in the work of both artists. Vanessa Lubach's portrait has been painted by Paul P Smith.
