= Ruth Hadden Memorial Award =

- Description: Former award for the best first novel published in Britain, with prize money allocated for publisher promotion
- Country: United Kingdom
- Presented by: BookTrust
- Status: Concluded

The Ruth Hadden Memorial Award is a former award for the best first novel published in Britain, which was administered by the Booktrust. It was awarded in the early 1990s and has now been discontinued.

The award was unusual in that the prize was awarded to a completed manuscript before acceptance by a publisher, and the prize money (in 1994, £2000) went to the publishers of the novel to spend on promoting it.

== Winners ==
- 1991: The Last Room, by Elean Thomas
- 1992: Leaving the Light On, by Catherine Merriman
- 1993: In the Place of Fallen Leaves, by Tim Pears
- 1994: Pig, by Andrew Cowan
