= Our Wives Under the Sea =

2022 novel by Julia Armfield

- First edition cover
- Author: Julia Armfield
- Language: English
- Genres: Horror; Gay literature
- Publisher: Picador
- Publication date: 3 March 2022
- Publication place: United Kingdom
- Pages: 240
- ISBN: 978-1-5290-1723-6

Our Wives Under the Sea is a 2022 British horror novel by Julia Armfield. It was Armfield's debut novel. The novel's story follows a married lesbian couple who become distant after one of them returns from a disastrous deep-sea dive. It received positive reviews from critics.

== Summary ==
The novel tells the story of a married couple living in England. Miri is a grant writer, while Leah is a deep-sea researcher who works for an organization known as The Centre. One day, Leah surfaces from an expedition to the bottom of the ocean, but suffers intense physical and behavioral changes: her skin has a texture as if she has drowned, she spends much of her time sitting in the bathtub, and she mainly talks about the ocean. Miri tries to call the Centre every day for information, but is usually unable to reach anyone. She feels a growing disconnect with her wife and enrolls them both in marriage counseling, where their sessions end after Leah is unable to show up from spending even more time in the bathtub.

As the days pass, Leah's symptoms grow worse: she has begun vomiting up saltwater, layers of her skin peel off in the bathtub, and she is losing sensations in her body. Miri also begins reflecting on her mother, who had died, and how she relied on Leah for support while grieving. Miri turns to online forums to find people she relates to, eventually reading a post that states the hardest part of grief is not the loss, but needing to accept the aftermath that one's partner is gone. She discusses her troubles with her friend Carmen, as well as Juna, the sister of Leah's deceased colleague Jelka. When Leah's body degrades and she begins taking on a more liquid form, Miri and Juna take her to Miri's mother's house for closure. There, Juna advises Miri on how to process her bereavement: by letting go of Leah. For their final goodbye, Miri carries Leah into the ocean and lets Leah drip through her fingers and into the water, accepting that her wife is no longer the person she once knew.

The novel is a dual narrative, with the story of Leah's voyage spliced between the present-day happenings with Miri. Leah had gone into a submarine with her two co-workers, the Catholic and saint-worshipping Jelka and the former fisherman Matteo. The submarine drops to an empty area at the bottom of the ocean with the communications systems cut out. While the three have enough food and water to survive, they suffer mentally due to the isolation and lack of contact with the surface world. Leah finds her memories of Miri slowly slipping away and is disappointed by the lack of research she can do, while Jelka becomes obsessed with voices that only she can hear and eventually commits suicide by escaping through a hatch. When the power suddenly comes back on, Matteo wants to go back to the surface, but Leah chooses to pilot it until they make a discovery. She finally comes in contact with a massive, unknowable, unrecognizable creature, which she is enamored by. In an attempt to communicate with it, she writes her name on a piece of paper and shows it to the being. As the sub resurfaces, the only thing on Leah's mind is to reunite with Miri.

== Themes ==
Aida Edemariam noted themes of "transformation and return" in the novel, calling it "a kind of Orpheus story." Kirkus Reviews described one of the main questions of the novel as "What happens to a marriage when one spouse is no longer the person you married?"

In an interview with Sam Manzella of Them, Armfield said that the novel was in part inspired by a wish to explore the "crossover with queer women’s fiction and the sea," adding that the ocean is often used to symbolise both "something forbidden" and something that "can be many things at once." In an interview with Sam Franzini of Our Culture Mag, she stated that the novel was in part "about an anticipation of grief and losing someone," adding that part of the horror was from "the clanging bureaucracy of not being able to get an answer."

== Reception ==
Kayla Kumari Upadhyaya of Autostraddle reviewed it as "a simultaneously bleak and beautiful elegiac novel," adding that the prose of the novel was "grotesque and lovely all at once." Alycia Pirmohamed of The Big Issue reviewed the novel similarly, saying that the novel was "exquisitely grotesque, surreal, and elegiac in equal measure," adding that it excelled in the "space of creeping horror, of suspense, of bodily peculiarity." Emily Watkins of i said that the novel "deftly weaves a love story into creeping horror," adding that the novel sticks close to "what life is made of... mapping the grim monotony of existence, the undignified and the humdrum, as much as it does the mythical side of Leah’s story."

Our Wives Under the Sea won the 2023 Polari Book Prize, being described by judge Joelle Taylor as a book that "opens up what we believe is possible from queer writing".
