= Katja Hoyer =

German-British historian (born 1985)

Katja Hoyer FRHistS
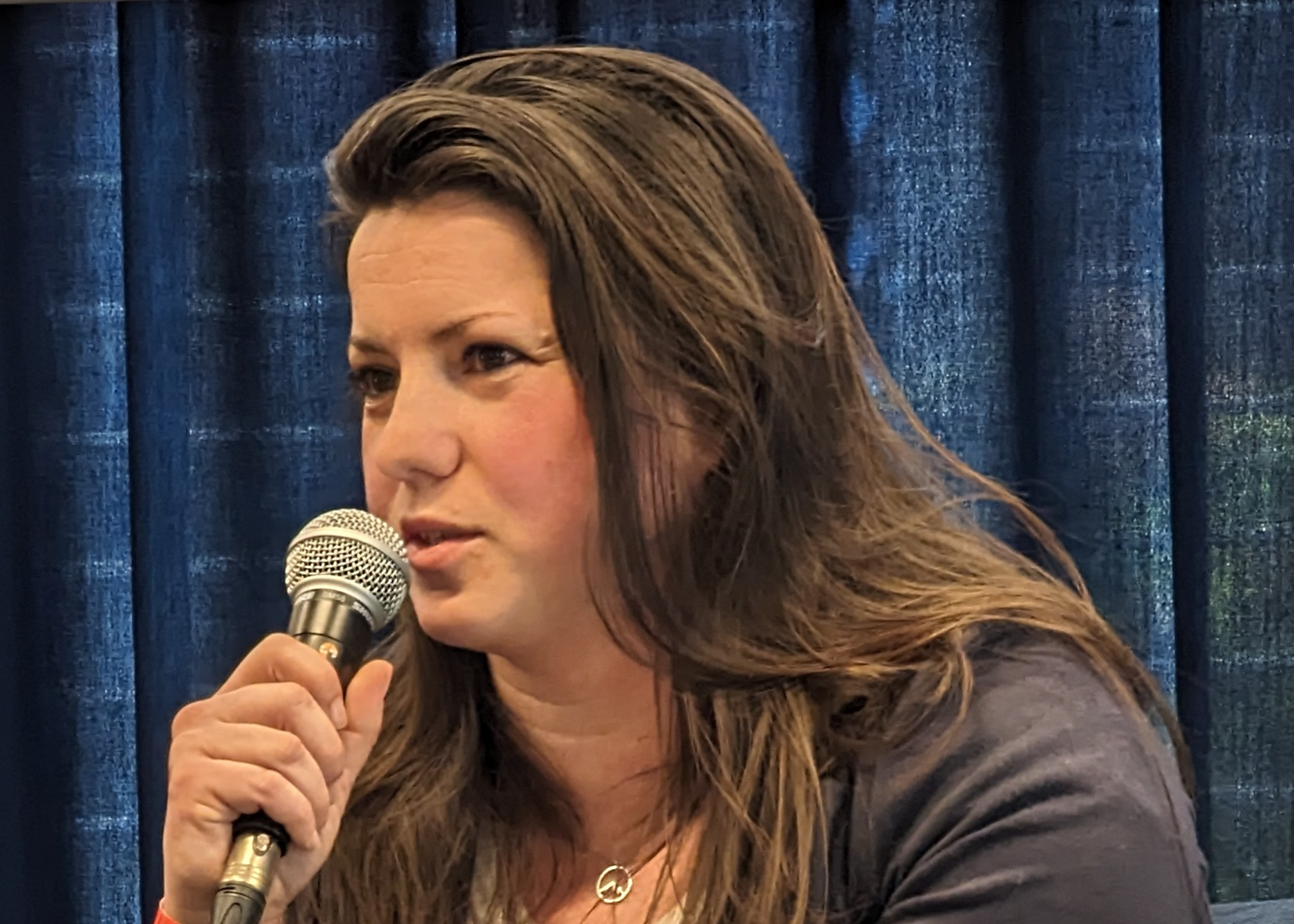
- Portrait of Hoyer, 2024
- Born: 1985 (age 40–41); Wilhelm-Pieck-Stadt Guben, German Democratic Republic
- Occupations: Historian, journalist, writer
- Known for: Work on East Germany

Academic background
- Education: University of Jena (MA)

Academic work
- Discipline: History
- Sub-discipline: History of modern Germany
- Institutions: King's College London
- Notable works: Beyond the Wall
- Website: katjahoyer.online

Katja Hoyer (born 1985, GDR) is a German-British historian, journalist and writer.

== Life and career ==
Hoyer was born in Wilhelm-Pieck-Stadt Guben, Bezirk Cottbus, German Democratic Republic (GDR), where her mother was a teacher and her father an officer of the National People's Army. She received a Master's degree from the University of Jena and moved to the United Kingdom in about 2010.

Hoyer is a visiting research fellow at King's College London and has published three books about the history of Germany. She is also a journalist for The Spectator, The Washington Post, Times Literary Supplement, UnHerd, and Die Welt.

Her first book, Blood and Iron, about the German Empire from 1871 to 1918, was well reviewed, even though some reviewers suggested that she had played down the negative aspects of the period and of Otto von Bismarck's legacy. Her second book, Beyond the Wall, about the history of the GDR from 1949 to 1990, was well reviewed in the United Kingdom, but less well received in Germany.

Hoyer is a Fellow of the Royal Historical Society.

== Works ==
=== Books ===
- Blood and Iron: The Rise and Fall of the German Empire 1871–1918 (The History Press, 2021) ISBN 9780750996228
- Beyond the Wall: East Germany, 1949–1990 (Random House, 2023)
- Weimar: Life on the Edge of Catastrophe (Allen Lane, 2026) ISBN 9781541605794

=== Articles ===
- "Life in East Germany: the cultural evolution behind the Iron Curtain"
- "What's 'wrong' with east Germany? Look to its long neglect by the wealthy west"
- "There's only one way to keep Germany's far-right AfD at bay. Address the concerns it exploits."

=== Film ===
- Hoyer served as Lead Historical Adviser and Technical Consultant for the 2025 BIFA-qualifying Cold War-set short film Whispers of Freedom, based on the true story of Chris Gueffroy.. The film had its German Premiere at the DDR Museum in Berlin, and regularly screens at the Museum's exhibition cinema - including on 5 February in commemoration of Gueffroy's death.
