= Leonora Brito =

Welsh writer

- Born: 7 July 1954; Cardiff, Wales
- Died: 14 June 2007 (aged 52); Cardiff, Wales
- Occupation: Writer
- Writing career
- Language: English
- Period: 1991–2007
- Notable work: Dat's Love (1995)

Leonora Brito (7 July 1954 – 14 June 2007) was a Welsh writer from Cardiff, Wales.

== Biography ==
Brito was born in Cardiff on 7 July 1954. She studied Law and History at Cardiff University. In 1991 she won the Rhys Davies Short Story Prize. Her first short story collection, Dat's Love (1995), was published by Seren Books and was described by Publishers Weekly as combining 'an unexpected setting (the Caribbean community in Wales) with some truly fresh writing'. In an article for The Guardian, Gary Younge states that 'with the exception of Leonora Brito's Dat's Love, the literary voices of blacks and Asians in Wales are rarely heard.' Michelle Deininger includes Brito in a group of short-story writers of the 1980s and 1990s, who "changed the direction of the form further" and particularly highlights Brito's contribution as a "voice of the experience of Welsh people of colour".

Brito's Chequered Histories (2006), another short story collection, was also published by Seren. In addition to prose, she wrote successfully for radio and television. She died in 2007.

== Publications ==
- 1995: Dat's Love, Seren
- 2006: Chequered Histories, Seren
