= Year of the Rat (book) =

2025 book

- Authors: Harry Shukman
- Language: English
- Subject: Far-right politics in the United Kingdom
- Genre: Non-fiction, politics
- Publisher: Chatto & Windus
- Publication date: 2025
- Publication place: United Kingdom
- Pages: 320
- Award: Sunday Times Young Writer of the Year Award (2025)

Year of the Rat: Undercover in the British Far Right is a 2025 book by Harry Shukman.

== Summary ==
Harry Shukman is a reporter with the British advocacy group Hope not Hate. In the book, Shukman describes his year going undercover beginning in 2023 to infiltrate far-right organisations in the UK and investigate them.

== Critical reception ==
David Bennun of The Jewish Chronicle reviewed the book as "illuminating and disturbing,"

Andrew Anthony of The Observer described the book as "compelling," but criticised Shukman's definition of the far-right as being overly broad, saying that "I'm not sure how helpful this broad-brush approach is in identifying the most concerning trends and figures, and it may even have the counterproductive effect of further alienating Reform voters, arguably the largest electoral block at this moment in time, from mainstream politics." Nicholas Harris of The New Statesman reviewed the book as "courageous and diligent... a close and gripping inspection of the character of the far right and threat it poses," but said that "ultimately Shukman’s distance from the men he writes about is too great to overcome."

Writing in UnHerd, Simon Cottee of the Danube Institute gave the book a negative review, accusing Shukman of having "likely set back the study of the far-Right, making it much harder for genuine researchers to study its members up close and to win their trust," adding that "he has not advanced the study of the far-Right one inch. He has no theory of mind of the far-Right activist and nothing of interest or originality to say about why or how people become part of its orbit, other than referencing some trite clichés about loneliness and alienation. And the revelations he discloses are scarcely earth-shattering."

Shukman won the 2025 Sunday Times Young Writer of the Year Award for The Year of the Rat.
