= Julia Armfield =

British author

- Born: 26 July 1990 (age 36); London, England
- Education: Royal Holloway, University of London (MA)
- Occupation: Author
- Spouse: Rosalie Bower (m. 2023)
- Writing career
- Years active: 2019–present
- Notable work: Our Wives Under the Sea
- Notable awards: Polari Prize; 2022 Our Wives Under the Sea
- Website: juliaarmfield.co.uk

Julia Armfield (born 1990) is an English author. She is known for her novels Our Wives Under the Sea (2022) and Private Rites (2024).

== Early life and education ==
Armfield was born in 1990 in London and raised in Cobham, Surrey. She attended Lady Eleanor Holles School. Her mother was a stage manager and her father worked in London. Her brother is an actor at the Royal Shakespeare Company.

Armfield earned a master's degree in Victorian art and literature from Royal Holloway, University of London. Her thesis was on "teeth, hair, and nails in the Victorian imagination." She has cited H.P. Lovecraft, Shirley Jackson, and Stephen King as influences.

== Career ==
After attending a Curtis Brown creative writing course, Armfield began writing short stories while working as an education manager at Inner Temple. After being longlisted for the Deborah Rogers prize, her short story "The Great Awake" won the White Review prize in 2018. Her first collection of short stories, salt slow, was published in 2019. It featured "The Great Awake", as well as eight other horror stories with a focus on female adolescence as body horror. Her short story "Longshore Drift" was selected for the Pushcart Prize anthology in 2021.

Our Wives Under the Sea, Armfield's debut novel, was published in 2022. It follows Miri and her wife Leah, a marine biologist who displays strange symptoms after returning from a deep sea exploration. The novel won the Polari Prize and was shortlisted for the Lambda Literary Award for Lesbian Fiction.

Armfield's second novel Private Rites is loosely based on Shakespeare's play King Lear. It follows three sisters struggling to cope with their father's death amidst a climate crisis characterized by constant rain and rising flood waters. The Guardian called the novel "brilliantly audacious," praising how "it never commits to an apocalyptic vision, even as the world it depicts becomes cartoonishly apocalyptic."

On 26 June 2025, 4th Estate announced it had acquired two further books by Armfield. The first, Up to the Light, is described as "the story of two climbers, Liam and Petal, and their ill-fated attempt to conquer a previously unclimbed route in the Swiss Alps" and is expected to be released in spring 2027.

== Awards ==
Year	Title	Award	Category	Result	Ref
2018	"The Great Awake"	The White Review Short Story Prize		Won	
2022	Our Wives Under the Sea	Goodreads Choice Awards	Debut Novel	Nominated	
2022	Our Wives Under the Sea	Goodreads Choice Awards	Horror	Nominated	
2022	Our Wives Under the Sea	Foyles Book of the Year	Fiction	Nominated	
2023	Our Wives Under the Sea	Kitschies	Golden Tentacle (Debut Novel)	Won	
2023	Our Wives Under the Sea	Lambda Literary Award	Lesbian Fiction	Shortlisted	
2023	Our Wives Under the Sea	Polari Prize	—	Won	
2025	Private Rites	Climate Fiction Prize	—	Longlisted	
2025	Private Rites	Arthur C. Clarke Award	—	Shortlisted	

== Bibliography ==
- salt slow (2019, Picador: ISBN 9781250224781)
- Our Wives Under the Sea (2022, Picador: ISBN 978-1-5290-1723-6)
- Private Rites (2024, 4th Estate: ISBN 978-0008608033)
- Up to the Light (2027, 4th Estate: ISBN 978-0008806255)
