= Elmet (novel) =

2017 debut novel by Fiona Mozley

- Author: Fiona Mozley
- Language: English
- Genre: Literary fiction
- Publisher: John Murray Originals
- Publication date: August 10, 2017
- Publication place: United Kingdom
- Pages: 311 (1st ed paperback)
- Awards: Polari Prize (2018); Somerset Maugham Award (2018)
- ISBN: 9781473660540 (1st ed paperback)
- OCLC: 981691703
- Dewey Decimal: 823/.92
- LC Class: PR6113.O97 E46 2017

Elmet is the 2017 debut novel by Fiona Mozley. In September 2017, it was shortlisted for the 2017 Booker Prize.

== Plot ==
The narrator who speaks in the sections in cursive seems to be looking for somebody against a modern landscape of highways, lorries and café stopovers.

We will come to realise that this is Daniel, a boy who used to live in the middle of the forest with Daddy and big sister Cathy. There is mystery about the comings and goings of the father, and why the mother is always absent. Little by little the reader comes to understand that the father works as a thug for Mr Price, who owns all the ex-controlled rent houses and flats in the area. The father is also the unbeaten winning champion in unlawful boxing matches of the area. Most of this information is conveyed by Vivien, an elderly neighbour who lives a hike away and who tries to educate Cathy and Daniel to a certain degree. While Daniel stays at her house reading, Cathy strolls around the forests.

At some point the father stops extorting rents for Mr. Price and does the opposite, pushing people to strike to get higher wages and to get reasonable rents for their households. Mr. Price offers him the deeds of the land in which he is living to go to Daniel in exchange of one last big boxing gig. He will win this one as well, although everything seemed to be stuck against him.

One of the two good-for-nothing sons of Mr Price is strangled. The father is accused of killing him. His children try to look for his father instead of running away. Vivien will not help, a friend accuses the father of stealing 50,000 pounds from his safe. Cathy confesses to have killed the Price boy. In the final showdown, only Daniel will survive, although Vivien says that she might have seen a shadowed silhouette leaving the burning house where the three of them were being tortured by Mr. Price and his thugs. Daniel thinks that this must be Cathy, and keeps on searching for her and Daddy. Year

== Awards ==
| Year | Prize | | Result | Ref |
|---|---|---|---|---|
| 2017 | Booker Prize | — | Shortlisted | |
| 2018 | Dylan Thomas Prize | — | Longlisted | |
| 2018 | Edmund White Award | — | Shortlisted | |
| 2018 | Ondaatje Prize | — | Shortlisted | |
| 2018 | Polari Prize | First Book | Won | |
| 2018 | Somerset Maugham Award | — | Won | |
| 2018 | Women's Prize for Fiction | — | Longlisted | |
| 2019 | Europese Literatuurprijs | — | Longlisted | |
| 2019 | International Dublin Literary Award | — | Longlisted | |

== Reception ==
In a review for Publishers Weekly a reader noted that the novel had "many eerily beautiful scenes," and that the author "is best when describing the tight-knit family in its isolated splendor."

While Kirkus highly praised the author stating that:

Mozley’s instantaneous success—this debut landed straight on the 2017 Man Booker Prize shortlist—is a response to the stylish intensity of her work, which boldly winds multiple genres into a rich spinning top of a tale.(2017)
