= Beyond the Wall (book) =

2023 book by Katja Hoyer

Beyond the Wall: East Germany, 1949–1990
- Author: Katja Hoyer
- Publisher: Random House
- Publication date: 2023
- Publication place: United Kingdom
- ISBN: 978-024155378-7

Beyond the Wall: East Germany, 1949–1990 is a 2023 history book about East Germany written by German historian Katja Hoyer. Hoyer was born in what was then East Germany in 1985, but had lived in the UK for several years prior to the book's release.

== Content ==
The book covers the history of East Germany in the period between 1949 and 1990, including the sudden and unexpected collapse of the state with the fall of the Berlin Wall, as well as many other points in the state's history. It includes both large historical events and anecdotal stories of ordinary people living within the state.

== Reception ==
The book received broadly positive reviews in the UK. A review in The Telegraph heavily praised the book, rating it as 5 out of 5 stars and describing it as "exhaustively researched, cleverly constructed and beautifully written (in her second language)". A review in The Times was also complimentary, arguing that "there are times when her book comes over as special pleading for the lost state. But that is to miss the point. Rather, she displays a special understanding and wants to present a corrective to previous reductive assessments of the GDR that depict it as a field-grey Stasiland, a dystopian model of a surveillance state."

Some British publications gave mixed reviews. A review in The Economist praised the book, stating that it brought "depth, texture and colour" to the public perception of East Germany, continuing that "Her book is packed with vignettes and anecdotes that bring this half-forgotten side of German history to life. Your reviewer was a foreign correspondent covering the GDR in the late 1980s and married an East German. These stories ring true." Parts of the review were also critical, stating that "...sentimentality and relativism distort her evaluation of a loathsome dictatorship." A review in The Observer described the book as a "rich, counterintuitive history", but argued it would have benefited from drawing comparisons to other Eastern Bloc countries. A review in The Times Literary Supplement argued that the account given in the book was incomplete in some areas, but said that "Despite its curious blanks, Katja Hoyer's book does much to combat amnesia and Cold War prejudice, and to normalize the GDR and the people who lived there." A review in The Guardian notes that it is "essential reading" for giving readers "not so much [a] sense of what East GerMans lost, as what [western democracies] never had."

The book was more controversial in Germany. Ilko-Sascha Kowalczuk, a historian who was persecuted by the East German regime in his youth, accused Hoyer of downplaying the extent to which the state influenced everyday life, commenting that "If a book like this about the Nazi period came out, there would be an outcry... It gives the impression you can live in a dictatorship without having anything to do with it." Norbert Pötzl, a former reporter for Der Spiegel, took the view that Hoyer was "trying to prove that not everything was bad in the GDR", implying that her family background made her sympathetic to the regime as both her parents were government employees. A review in Die Tageszeitung also argued that Hoyer was not critical enough of the regime, and mocked the fact that her mother had taken her to interview Egon Krenz, the final communist leader of East Germany, as part of her research.

A 2024 opinion piece by author Carolin Würfel summarised the endemic dismissal of East Germany writings within unified Germany, and the negative treatment that Beyond the Wall received specifically.
