= Fiona Mozley =

English novelist

- Born: 1988 (age 37–38); Hackney, London, England
- Education: King's College, Cambridge; University of York
- Occupations: Writer; novelist
- Writing career
- Language: English
- Years active: 2017 – present
- Genre: Literary fiction
- Notable works: Elmet; Hot Stew
- Notable awards: Polari Prize (2018); Somerset Maugham Award (2018)
- Website: www.fionamozley.com

Fiona Mozley (born 1988) is an English novelist and medievalist. Her debut contemporary novel Elmet (2017) was shortlisted for the Booker Prize and received a number of further accolades.

== Early life and education ==
Fiona Mozley was born in 1988 in the London Borough of Hackney, and grew up in York, where she attended Fulford School. After graduating from King's College, Cambridge, Mozley lived in Honor Oak and briefly taught English in Buenos Aires before moving back to York in 2013 for her Master of Arts (MA). As of 2017, she was in the midst of her PhD thesis at the University of York on the concept of decay in the Late Middle Ages. She also works part-time in a bookshop.

== Career ==
Mozley sees as York's most significant literature its Mystery Plays. These along with local drama groups she views "as having influenced my own writing more significantly than any books I have read." When asked at an earlier interview about writers and works she particularly enjoyed, she mentioned some by Cormac McCarthy and Ursula K. Le Guin, and by Philip Pullman, whom she had loved as a child. Mozley's novel Elmet appeared in the 2018 Irish Leaving Certificate English examination.

Mozley was elected a Fellow of the Royal Society of Literature in 2022.

=== Works ===
The name "Elmet" is taken from a Celtic kingdom that once covered West Yorkshire. In the novel, Mozley "wanted to capture the ambiguity of local historical recollections; to say something about their double-edged thrall; to examine the desire to live in the past and the need to extricate oneself from it."

The novel Elmet is concerned strongly with the idea of home, "the building of a house, the preparation of food; stolen glimpses of a woman's wardrobe." This moves stealthily onto the fact that the 14-year-old narrator, Daniel, is not just domesticated, but must come to terms with being gay, or even transgender, while his older sister Cathy is a tomboy "raised in isolation by a man poorly suited to the job, and taught skills typically taken up by boys." "Daddy" is kind to his two children, but otherwise known to be violent. The father's concern is for the land: "the wilderness tamed by man's benevolent but dictatorial hand... [that] provides fertile ground for the evil that men do." The front cover of the novel was illustrated by Vanessa Lubach using a multilayered linocut.

Mozley's second novel titled Hot Stew was published in 2021. Writing for The Guardian, Alex Preston praised the work and said it confirmed the author was "a writer of extraordinary empathic gifts".

== Adaptations ==
Elmet was adapted for stage by Javaad Alipoor. The play was staged in 2025 as part of Bradford's City of Culture festivities.

== Personal life ==
Mozley is queer.

== Awards ==
Year	Work	Prize		Result	Ref
2017	Elmet	Booker Prize	—	Shortlisted	
2018	Elmet	Dylan Thomas Prize	—	Longlisted	
2018	Elmet	Edmund White Award	—	Shortlisted	
2018	Elmet	Ondaatje Prize	—	Shortlisted	
2018	Elmet	Polari Prize	First Book	Won	
2018	Elmet	Somerset Maugham Award	—	Won	
2018	Elmet	Women's Prize for Fiction	—	Longlisted	
2019	Elmet	Europese Literatuurprijs	—	Longlisted	
2019	Elmet	International Dublin Literary Award	—	Longlisted	
2021	Hot Stew	Dylan Thomas Prize	—	Longlisted	

== Bibliography ==
- —— (2017). Elmet (1st paperback ed.). John Murray Originals. ISBN 9781473660540.
- —— (2021). Hot Stew (1st hardcover ed.). ISBN 9781643751559.
- Awake Awake (2026)
