= Polari Prize =

LBGTQ+ literary award

The Polari Prize is an annual UK literary prize for LGBTQ+ literature. Established by Paul Burston and the Polari Salon, the prize has been awarded annually since its launch in 2011.

- The Polari First Book Prize is restricted to first books by writers who were born or work in the UK and Ireland.
- In 2019 a further award was introduced, the Polari Prize for Book of the Year.
- In 2024 a Polari Children's & YA Prize was awarded to The Fights That Make Us by Sarah Hagger-Holt, published by Usborne Books.

== Polari First Book Prize ==
Year	Author	Title	Publisher	Ref.
2011	James Maker	AutoFellatio	Inkandescent	
2012	John McCullough	The Frost Fairs	Salt Publishing	
2013	Mari Hannah	The Murder Wall	Pan Macmillan	
2014	Diriye Osman	Fairytales for Lost Children	Angelica Entertainment	
2015	Kirsty Logan	The Rental Heart and Other Fairytales	Salt Publishing	
2016	Paul McVeigh	The Good Son	Salt Publishing	
2017	Saleem Haddad	Guapa	Europa Editions	
2018	Fiona Mozley	Elmet	John Murray	
2019	Angela Chadwick	XX	Dialogue Books	
2020	Amrou Al-Kadhi	Life as a Unicorn	Fourth Estate	
2021	Mohsin Zaidi	A Dutiful Boy	Square Peg	
2022	Adam Zmith	Deep Sniff	Watkins	
2023	Jon Ransom	The Whale Tattoo	Muswell Press	
2024	Nicola Dinan	Bellies	Penguin Books	

== Polari Prize for Book of the Year ==
Year	Author	Title	Publisher	Ref.
2019	Andrew McMillan	playtime	Jonathan Cape	
2020	Kate Davies	In the Deep End	HarperCollins	
2021	Diana Souhami	No Modernism Without Lesbians	Head of Zeus	
2022	Joelle Taylor	C+nto & Othered Poems	The Westbourne Press	
2023	Julia Armfield	Our Wives Under the Sea	Pan Macmillan	
2024	Jon Ransom	The Gallopers	Muswell Press	

== Polari Prize for Children's and Young Adult Works ==
Year	Author	Title	Publisher	Ref.
2024	Sarah Hagger-Holt	The Fights That Make Us	Usborne	

== 2025 controversy ==
In August 2025, after the inclusion of John Boyne’s Earth on the Book of the Year longlist, Nicola Dinan resigned as a judge of the Prize and several authors requested they be withdrawn from the longlist. As of 15 August 2025, 10 of the 12 nominees for the First Book Prize, 6 of the 11 other Book of the Year nominees and two of the judges had requested their withdrawal, with two further Book of the Year nominees criticising Boyne's inclusion but stating that they will not be withdrawing. Boyne had previously described himself in the Irish Independent, with reference to J. K. Rowling, as a "fellow TERF". An open letter and petition by authors Niamh Ní Mhaoileoin and Emma van Straaten called on the prize to withdraw Boyne from the longlist was signed by over 800 writers and people in the publishing industry; other authors speaking out against Boyne's longlisting included Patrick Ness.

On 18 August 2025, the organisers announced they would "pause" the prize for 2025. In a statement, the organisers said they "condemn all forms of transphobia" and would now "increase representation of trans and gender non-conforming judges on panels and undertake a governance and management review". In an op-ed in The Daily Telegraph the following day, Boyne expressed disappointment that nobody from the Polari Prize had contacted him throughout what he described as a "literary scandal".

== See also ==
- List of LGBTQ literary awards
- Edmund White Award
- Lambda Literary Award for LGBT Debut Fiction
