= Cholmondeley Award =

Poetry award

The Cholmondeley Awards (/ˈtʃʌmli/ CHUM-lee) are annual awards for poetry given by the Society of Authors in the United Kingdom. Awards honour distinguished poets, from a fund endowed by the Sybil Cholmondeley, Marchioness of Cholmondeley in 1966. Since 1991 the award has been made to four poets each year, to the total value of £8000.

== List of prize winners ==
=== 2000s ===
2000s Cholmondeley Awards winners
Year	Winner	Ref.
2000	Alistair Elliot	
2000	Michael Hamburger	
2000	Adrian Henri	
2000	Carole Satyamurti	
2001	Ian Duhig	
2001	Paul Durcan	
2001	Kathleen Jamie	
2001	Grace Nichols	
2002	Moniza Alvi	
2002	David Constantine	
2002	Liz Lochhead	
2002	Brian Patten	
2003	Ciaran Carson	
2003	Michael Donaghy	
2003	Lavinia Greenlaw	
2003	Jackie Kay	
2004	John Agard	
2004	Ruth Padel	
2004	Lawrence Sail	
2004	Eva Salzman	
2005	Jane Duran	
2005	Christopher Logue	
2005	M. R. Peacocke	
2005	Neil Rollinson	
2006	Alan Jenkins	
2006	Mimi Khalvati	
2006	Jo Shapcott	
2007	Judith Kazantzis	
2007	Robert Nye	
2007	Penelope Shuttle	
2008	John Burnside	
2008	John Greening	
2008	David Harsent	
2008	Sarah Maguire	
2009	Bernard O'Donoghue	
2009	Alice Oswald	
2009	Fiona Sampson	
2009	Pauline Stainer	
2010	Gillian Allnutt	
2010	Colette Bryce	
2010	Gwyneth Lewis	
2010	Deryn Rees-Jones	
2011	Imtiaz Dharker	
2011	Michael Haslam	
2011	Lachlan Mackinnon	
2012	Christine Evans	
2012	Don Paterson	
2012	Peter Riley	
2012	Robin Robertson	
2013	Simon Armitage	
2013	Paul Farley	
2013	Lee Harwood	
2013	Medbh McGuckian	
2014	W.N. Herbert	
2014	Jeremy Hooker	
2014	John James	
2014	Glyn Maxwell	
2014	Denise Riley	
2015	Patience Agbabi	
2015	Brian Catling	
2015	Christopher Middleton	
2015	Pascale Petit	
2015	J. H. Prynne	
2016	Maura Dooley	
2016	David Morley	
2016	Peter Sansom	
2016	Iain Sinclair	
2017	Caroline Bergvall	
2017	Sasha Dugdale	
2017	Philip Gross	
2017	Paula Meehan	
2018	Vahni Capildeo	
2018	Kate Clanchy	
2018	Linton Kwesi Johnson	
2018	Daljit Nagra	
2018	Zoë Skoulding	
2019	Malika Booker	
2019	Fred D'Aguiar	
2019	Allen Fisher	
2019	Jamie McKendrick	
2020	Alec Finlay	
2020	Linda France	
2020	Bhanu Kapil	
2020	Hannah Lowe	
2020	Rod Mengham	
2021	Paula Claire	
2021	Kei Miller	
2021	Katrina Porteous	
2021	Maurice Riordan	
2021	Susan Wicks	
2022	Tiffany Atkinson	
2022	Menna Elfyn	
2022	David Kinloch	
2022	Gerry Loose	
2022	Maggie O'Sullivan	
2023	Caroline Bird	
2023	Jane Draycott	
2023	Greta Stoddart	
2023	Michael Symmons Roberts	
2023	Jackie Wills	
2023	Tamar Yoseloff	
2024	Fiona Benson	
2024	Gerry Cambridge	
2024	Julia Copus	
2024	Leontia Flynn	
2024	Helen Ivory	
2024	Roger Robinson	
2025	James Byrne	
2025	Jane Commane	
2025	Annie Freud	
2025	John Lyons	
2025	Karen McCarthy Woolf	

=== 1900s ===
1900s Cholmondeley Awards winners
Year	Winner	Ref.
1966	Ted Walker	
1966	Stevie Smith	
1967	Seamus Heaney	
1967	Brian Jones	
1967	Norman Nicholson	
1968	Harold Massingham	
1968	Edwin Morgan	
1969	Derek Walcott	
1969	Tony Harrison	
1970	Kathleen Raine	
1970	Douglas Livingstone	
1970	Edward Brathwaite	
1971	Charles Causley	
1971	Gavin Ewart	
1971	Hugo Williams	
1972	Molly Holden	
1972	Tom Raworth	
1972	Patricia Whittaker	
1973	Patric Dickinson	
1973	Philip Larkin	
1974	D. J. Enright	
1974	Vernon Scannell	
1974	Alasdair Maclean	
1975	Jenny Joseph	
1975	Norman MacCaig	
1975	John Ormond	
1976	Peter Porter	
1976	Fleur Adcock	
1977	Peter Bland	
1977	George MacBeth	
1977	James Simmons	
1977	Andrew Waterman	
1978	D. M. Thomas	
1978	R. S. Thomas	
1978	Christopher Hope	
1978	Leslie Norris	
1978	Peter Reading	
1979	Alan Brownjohn	
1979	Andrew Motion	
1979	Charles Tomlinson	
1980	George Barker	
1980	Terence Tiller	
1980	Roy Fuller	
1981	Roy Fisher	
1981	Robert Garioch	
1981	Charles Boyle	
1982	Basil Bunting	
1982	Herbert Lomas	
1982	William Scammell	
1983	John Fuller	
1983	Craig Raine	
1983	Anthony Thwaite	
1984	Michael Baldwin	
1984	Michael Hofmann	
1984	Carol Rumens	
1985	Dannie Abse	
1985	Peter Redgrove	
1985	Brian Taylor	
1986	Lawrence Durrell	
1986	James Fenton	
1986	Selima Hill	
1987	Wendy Cope	
1987	Matthew Sweeney	
1987	George Szirtes	
1988	John Heath-Stubbs	
1988	Sean O'Brien	
1988	John Whitworth	
1989	E. J. Scovell	
1989	Peter Didsbury	
1989	Douglas Dunn	
1990	Kingsley Amis	
1990	Elaine Feinstein	
1990	Michael O'Neill	
1991	James Berry	
1991	Sujata Bhatt	
1991	Michael Hulse	
1991	Derek Mahon	
1992	Carol Ann Duffy	
1992	Allen Curnow	
1992	Donald Davie	
1992	Roger Woddis	
1993	George Mackay Brown	
1993	P. J. Kavanagh	
1993	Patricia Beer	
1993	Michael Longley	
1994	Ruth Fainlight	
1994	Gwen Harwood	
1994	Elizabeth Jennings	
1994	John Mole	
1995	U. A. Fanthorpe	
1995	C. H. Sisson	
1995	Christopher Reid	
1995	Kit Wright	
1996	Iain Crichton Smith	
1996	Elizabeth Bartlett	
1996	Dorothy Nimmo	
1996	Peter Scupham	
1997	Alison Brackenbury	
1997	Gillian Clarke	
1997	Tony Curtis	
1997	Anne Stevenson	
1998	Roger McGough	
1998	Robert Minhinnick	
1998	Anne Ridler	
1998	Ken Smith	
1999	Vicki Feaver	
1999	Geoffrey Hill	
1999	Elma Mitchell	
1999	Sheenagh Pugh	

== See also ==
- List of British literary awards
- British poetry
- List of poetry awards
- List of years in poetry
- List of years in literature
