= T. S. Eliot Prize =

British poetry prize

- Awarded for: Best collection of new verse in English first published in the UK or the Republic of Ireland
- Country: United Kingdom
- Rewards: £25,000 GBP (winner) £1,500 GBP (finalists)
- First award: 1993; 33 years ago
- Website: Official website

The T. S. Eliot Prize for Poetry is a prize for poetry awarded by the T. S. Eliot Foundation. For many years it was awarded by the Eliots' Poetry Book Society (UK) for "the best collection of new verse in English first published in the UK or the Republic of Ireland" in any particular year. The Prize was inaugurated in 1993 in celebration of the Poetry Book Society's 40th birthday and in honour of its founding poet, T. S. Eliot. Since its inception, the prize money was donated by Eliot's widow, Valerie Eliot and more recently it has been given by the T. S. Eliot Estate.

The T. S. Eliot Foundation took over the administration of the T. S. Eliot Prize in 2016, appointing as its new director Chris Holifield (formerly director of the Poetry Book Society), when the former Poetry Book Society charity had to be wound up, with its book club and company name taken over by book sales agency Inpress Ltd in Newcastle. Holifield retired at the end of June 2022 after 20 years in the post, and was replaced by Mike Sims. The winner now receives £25,000 and the ten shortlisted poets each receive £1,500, making it the United Kingdom's most valuable annual poetry competition. The Prize has been called "the most coveted award in poetry".

The shortlist for the Prize is announced in October of each year, and the 10 shortlisted poets take part in the Readings at the Royal Festival Hall in London's Southbank Centre on the evening before the announcement of the Prize. Two thousand people attended the 2011 reading.

== Winners and Shortlists ==
=== 1990s ===
Year	Author	Title	Publisher	Result	Ref
1993	Ciaran Carson	First Language: Poems	Gallery Press	Won	
1993	Moniza Alvi	The Country at My Shoulder	OUP / Oxford Poetry	Shortlisted	
1993	Patricia Beer	Friend of Heraclitus	Carcanet Press	Shortlisted	
1993	Carol Ann Duffy	Mean Time	Anvil Press	Shortlisted	
1993	Douglas Dunn	Dante's Drum Kit	Faber & Faber	Shortlisted	
1993	James Fenton	Out of Danger	Penguin Poetry	Shortlisted	
1993	Stephen Knight	Flowering Limbs	Bloodaxe Books	Shortlisted	
1993	Les Murray	Translations from the Natural World	Carcanet Press	Shortlisted	
1993	Sharon Olds	The Father	Secker & Warburg	Shortlisted	
1993	Don Paterson	Nil Nil	Faber & Faber	Shortlisted	
1994	Paul Muldoon	The Annals of Chile	Faber & Faber	Won	
1994	John Burnside	The Myth of the Twin	Cape Poetry	Shortlisted	
1994	Eavan Boland	In a Time of Violence	Carcanet Press	Shortlisted	
1994	W. N. Herbert	Forked Tongue	Bloodaxe Books	Shortlisted	
1994	Kathleen Jamie	The Queen of Sheba	Bloodaxe Books	Shortlisted	
1994	Geoffrey Lehmann	Spring Forest	Angus & Robertson	Shortlisted	
1994	Tom Paulin	Walking a Line	Faber & Faber	Shortlisted	
1994	Peter Porter	Millenial Fables	OUP / Oxford Poetry	Shortlisted	
1994	Hugo Williams	Dock Leaves	OUP / Oxford Poetry	Shortlisted	
1994	Gerard Woodward	After the Deafening	Chatto & Windus	Shortlisted	
1995	Mark Doty	My Alexandria	Cape Poetry	Won	
1995	Simon Armitage	The Dead Sea Poems	Faber & Faber	Shortlisted	
1995	Ian Duhig	The Mersey Goldfish	Bloodaxe Books	Shortlisted	
1995	Michael Longley	The Ghost Orchid	Cape Poetry	Shortlisted	
1995	Glyn Maxwell	Rest for the Wicked	Bloodaxe Books	Shortlisted	
1995	Bernard O'Donoghue	Gunpowder	Chatto & Windus	Shortlisted	
1995	Katherine Pierpoint	Truffle Beds	Faber & Faber	Shortlisted	
1995	Maurice Riordan	A Word from the Loki	Faber & Faber	Shortlisted	
1995	Jackie Wills	Powder Tower	Arc Poetry	Shortlisted	
1995	Glyn Wright	Could Have Been Funny	Spike	Shortlisted	
1996	Les Murray	Subhuman Redneck Poems	Carcanet Press	Won	
1996	Ciaran Carson	Opera Et Cetera	Bloodaxe Books / Gallery Press	Shortlisted	
1996	Maura Dooley	Kissing A Bone	Bloodaxe Books	Shortlisted	
1996	John Fuller	Stones and Fires	Chatto & Windus	Shortlisted	
1996	Seamus Heaney	The Spirit Level	Faber & Faber	Shortlisted	
1996	Stephen Knight	Dream City Cinema	Bloodaxe Books	Shortlisted	
1996	Adrian Mitchell	Blue Coffee	Bloodaxe Books	Shortlisted	
1996	Alice Oswald	The Thing in the Gap Stone Stile	OUP / Oxford Poetry	Shortlisted	
1996	Christopher Reid	Expanded Universes	Faber & Faber	Shortlisted	
1996	Susan Wicks	The Clever Daughter	Faber & Faber	Shortlisted	
1997	Don Paterson	God's Gift to Women	Faber & Faber	Won	
1997	Fleur Adcock	Looking Back	OUP / Oxford Poetry	Shortlisted	
1997	Gillian Allnutt	Nantucket and the Angel	Bloodaxe Books	Shortlisted	
1997	Helen Dunmore	Bestiary	Bloodaxe Books	Shortlisted	
1997	Selima Hill	Violet	Bloodaxe Books	Shortlisted	
1997	Jamie McKendrick	The Marble Fly	OUP / Oxford Poetry	Shortlisted	
1997	Peter Reading	Work in Regress	Bloodaxe Books	Shortlisted	
1997	Matthew Sweeney	The Bridal Suite	Cape Poetry	Shortlisted	
1997	Derek Walcott	The Bounty	Faber & Faber	Shortlisted	
1997	John Hartley Williams	Canada	Bloodaxe Books	Shortlisted	
1998	Ted Hughes	Birthday Letters	Faber & Faber	Won	
1998	Sarah Corbett	The Red Wardrobe	Seren Books	Shortlisted	
1998	Fred D'Aguiar	Bill of Rights	Chatto & Windus	Shortlisted	
1998	David Harsent	A Bird's Idea of Flight	Faber & Faber	Shortlisted	
1998	Jackie Kay	Off Colour	Bloodaxe Books	Shortlisted	
1998	Glyn Maxwell	The Breakage	Faber & Faber	Shortlisted	
1998	Paul Muldoon	Hay	Faber & Faber	Shortlisted	
1998	Ruth Padel	Rembrandt Would Have Loved You	Chatto & Windus	Shortlisted	
1998	Jo Shapcott	My Life Asleep	OUP / Oxford Poetry	Shortlisted	
1998	Ken Smith	Wild Root	Bloodaxe Books	Shortlisted	
1999	Hugo Williams	Billy's Rain	Faber & Faber	Won	
1999	Anne Carson	Autobiography of Red	Cape Poetry	Shortlisted	
1999	Carol Ann Duffy	The World's Wife	Picador Poetry	Shortlisted	
1999	Paul Durcan	Greetings to our Friends in Brazil	Harvill Press	Shortlisted	
1999	Michael Hofmann	Approximately Nowhere	Faber & Faber	Shortlisted	
1999	Kathleen Jamie	Jizzen	Picador Poetry	Shortlisted	
1999	Michael Laskey	The Tightrope Wedding	Smith/Doorstop	Shortlisted	
1999	Bernard O'Donoghue	Here Nor There	Chatto & Windus	Shortlisted	
1999	Tom Paulin	The Wind Dog	Faber & Faber	Shortlisted	
1999	C. K. Williams	Repair	Bloodaxe Books	Shortlisted	

=== 2000s ===
2001 saw Canadian poet Anne Carson become the first woman to win the TS Eliot Prize.

Year	Author	Title	Publisher	Result	Ref
2000	Michael Longley	The Weather in Japan	Cape Poetry	Won	
2000	John Burnside	The Asylum Dance	Cape Poetry	Shortlisted	
2000	Anne Carson	Men in the Off Hours	Cape Poetry	Shortlisted	
2000	Michael Donaghy	Conjure	Picador Poetry	Shortlisted	
2000	Douglas Dunn	The Year's Afternoon	Faber & Faber	Shortlisted	
2000	Thom Gunn	Boss Cupid	Faber & Faber	Shortlisted	
2000	Alan Jenkins	The Drift	Chatto & Windus	Shortlisted	
2000	Roddy Lumsden	The Book of Love	Bloodaxe Books	Shortlisted	
2000	Anne Stevenson	Granny Scarecrow	Bloodaxe Books	Shortlisted	
2000	Derek Walcott	Tiepolo's Hound	Faber & Faber	Shortlisted	
2001	Anne Carson	The Beauty of the Husband	Cape Poetry	Won	
2001	Gillian Allnutt	Lintel	Bloodaxe Books	Shortlisted	
2001	Charles Boyle	The Age of Cardboard and String	Faber & Faber	Shortlisted	
2001	Seamus Heaney	Electric Light	Faber & Faber	Shortlisted	
2001	Geoffrey Hill	Speech! Speech!	Penguin Poetry	Shortlisted	
2001	Selima Hill	Bunny	Bloodaxe Books	Shortlisted	
2001	James Lasdun	Landscape with Chainsaw	Cape Poetry	Shortlisted	
2001	Sean O'Brien	Downriver	Picador Poetry	Shortlisted	
2001	Pascale Petit	The Zoo Father	Seren Books	Shortlisted	
2001	Michael Symmons Roberts	Burning Babylon	Cape Poetry	Shortlisted	
2002	Alice Oswald	Dart	Faber & Faber	Won	
2002	Simon Armitage	The Universal Home Doctor	Faber & Faber	Shortlisted	
2002	John Burnside	The Light Trap	Cape Poetry	Shortlisted	
2002	Paul Farley	The Ice Age	Picador Poetry	Shortlisted	
2002	David Harsent	Marriage	Faber & Faber	Shortlisted	
2002	Geoffrey Hill	The Orchards of Syon	Penguin Poetry	Shortlisted	
2002	E. A. Markham	A Rough Climate	Anvil Press	Shortlisted	
2002	Sinéad Morrissey	Between Here and There	Carcanet Press	Shortlisted	
2002	Paul Muldoon	Moy Sand and Gravel	Faber & Faber	Shortlisted	
2002	Ruth Padel	Voodoo Shop	Chatto & Windus	Shortlisted	
2003	Don Paterson	Landing Light	Faber & Faber	Won	
2003	Billy Collins	Nine Horses	Picador Poetry	Shortlisted	
2003	John F. Deane	Manhandling the Deity	Carcanet Press	Shortlisted	
2003	Ian Duhig	The Lammas Hireling	Picador Poetry	Shortlisted	
2003	Lavinia Greenlaw	Minsk	Faber & Faber	Shortlisted	
2003	Jamie McKendrick	Ink Stone	Faber & Faber	Shortlisted	
2003	Bernard O'Donoghue	Outiving	Chatto & Windus	Shortlisted	
2003	Jacob Polley	The Brink	Picador Poetry	Shortlisted	
2003	Christopher Reid	For and After	Faber & Faber	Shortlisted	
2003	Jean Sprackland	Hard Water	Cape Poetry	Shortlisted	
2004	George Szirtes	Reel	Bloodaxe Books	Won	
2004	Colette Bryce	The Full Indian Rope Trick	Picador Poetry	Shortlisted	
2004	Kathryn Gray	The Never-Never	Seren Books	Shortlisted	
2004	Kathleen Jamie	The Tree House	Picador Poetry	Shortlisted	
2004	Michael Longley	Snow Water	Cape Poetry	Shortlisted	
2004	Ruth Padel	The Soho Leopard	Chatto & Windus	Shortlisted	
2004	Tom Paulin	The Road to Inver	Faber & Faber	Shortlisted	
2004	Peter Porter	Afterburner	Picador Poetry	Shortlisted	
2004	Michael Symmons Roberts	Corpus	Cape Poetry	Shortlisted	
2004	John Hartley Williams	Blues	Cape Poetry	Shortlisted	
2005	Carol Ann Duffy	Rapture	Picador Poetry	Won	
2005	Polly Clark	Take Me with You	Bloodaxe Books	Shortlisted	
2005	Helen Farish	Intimates	Cape Poetry	Shortlisted	
2005	David Harsent	Legion	Faber & Faber	Shortlisted	
2005	Sinéad Morrissey	The State of the Prisons	Carcanet Press	Shortlisted	
2005	Alice Oswald	Woods etc	Faber & Faber	Shortlisted	
2005	Pascale Petit	The Huntress	Seren Books	Shortlisted	
2005	Sheenagh Pugh	The Movement of Bodies	Seren Books	Shortlisted	
2005	John Stammers	Stolen Love Behaviour	Picador Poetry	Shortlisted	
2005	Gerard Woodward	We Were Pedestrians	Chatto & Windus	Shortlisted	
2006	Seamus Heaney	District and Circle	Faber & Faber	Won	
2006	Simon Armitage	Tyrannosaurus Rex versus The Corduroy Kid	Faber & Faber	Shortlisted	
2006	Paul Farley	Tramp in Flames	Picador Poetry	Shortlisted	
2006	W. N. Herbert	Bad Shaman Blues	Bloodaxe Books	Shortlisted	
2006	Jane Hirshfield	After	Bloodaxe Books	Shortlisted	
2006	Tim Liardet	The Blood Choir	Seren Books	Shortlisted	
2006	Paul Muldoon	Horse Latitudes	Faber & Faber	Shortlisted	
2006	Robin Robertson	Swithering	Picador Poetry	Shortlisted	
2006	Penelope Shuttle	Redgrove's Wife	Bloodaxe Books	Shortlisted	
2006	Hugo Williams	Dear Room	Faber & Faber	Shortlisted	
2007	Sean O'Brien	The Drowned Book	Picador Poetry	Won	
2007	Ian Duhig	The Speed of Dark	Picador Poetry	Shortlisted	
2007	Alan Gillis	Hawks and Doves	Gallery Press	Shortlisted	
2007	Sophie Hannah	Pessimism for Beginners	Carcanet Press	Shortlisted	
2007	Mimi Khalvati	The Meanest Flower	Carcanet Press	Shortlisted	
2007	Frances Leviston	Public Dream	Picador Poetry	Shortlisted	
2007	Sarah Maguire	The Pomegranates of Kandahar	Chatto & Windus	Shortlisted	
2007	Edwin Morgan	A Book of Lives	Carcanet Press	Shortlisted	
2007	Fiona Sampson	Common Prayer	Carcanet Press	Shortlisted	
2007	Matthew Sweeney	Black Moon	Cape Poetry	Shortlisted	
2008	Jen Hadfield	Nigh-No-Place	Bloodaxe Books	Won	
2008	Moniza Alvi	Europa	Bloodaxe Books	Shortlisted	
2008	Peter Bennet	The Glass Swarm	Flambard Press	Shortlisted	
2008	Ciarán Carson	For All We Know	Gallery Press	Shortlisted	
2008	Robert Crawford	Full Volume	Cape Poetry	Shortlisted	
2008	Maura Dooley	Life Under Water	Bloodaxe Books	Shortlisted	
2008	Mark Doty	Theories and Apparitions	Cape Poetry	Shortlisted	
2008	Mick Imlah	The Lost Leader	Faber & Faber	Shortlisted	
2008	Glyn Maxwell	Hide Now	Picador Poetry	Shortlisted	
2008	Stephen Romer	Yellow Studio	Carcanet Press	Shortlisted	
2009	Philip Gross	The Water Table	Bloodaxe Books	Won	
2009	Eiléan Ní Chuilleanáin	The Sun-fish	Gallery Press	Shortlisted	
2009	Fred D'Aguiar	Continental Shelf	Carcanet Press	Shortlisted	
2009	Jane Draycott	Over	Carcanet Press	Shortlisted	
2009	Sinéad Morrissey	Through the Square Window	Carcanet Press	Shortlisted	
2009	Sharon Olds	One Secret Thing	Cape Poetry	Shortlisted	
2009	Alice Oswald	Weeds & Wild Flowers	Faber & Faber	Shortlisted	
2009	Christopher Reid	A Scattering	Areté	Shortlisted	
2009	George Szirtes	The Burning of the Books and Other Poems	Bloodaxe Books	Shortlisted	
2009	Hugo Williams	West End Final	Faber & Faber	Shortlisted	

=== 2010s ===
2011 saw two shortlisted nominees, including 2002 winner Alice Oswald, withdraw their works as a protest against the sponsor.

Year	Author	Title	Publisher	Result	Ref
2010	Derek Walcott	White Egrets	Faber & Faber	Won	
2010	Simon Armitage	Seeing Stars	Faber & Faber	Shortlisted	
2010	Annie Freud	The Mirabelles	Picador Poetry	Shortlisted	
2010	John Haynes	You	Seren Books	Shortlisted	
2010	Seamus Heaney	Human Chain	Faber & Faber	Shortlisted	
2010	Pascale Petit	What the Water Gave Me	Seren Books	Shortlisted	
2010	Robin Robertson	The Wrecking Light	Picador Poetry	Shortlisted	
2010	Fiona Sampson	Rough Music	Carcanet Press	Shortlisted	
2010	Brian Turner	Phantom Noise	Bloodaxe Books	Shortlisted	
2010	Sam Willetts	New Light for the Old Dark	Cape Poetry	Shortlisted	
2011	John Burnside	Black Cat Bone	Cape Poetry	Won	
2011	Carol Ann Duffy	The Bees	Picador Poetry	Shortlisted	
2011	Leontia Flynn	Profit and Loss	Cape Poetry	Shortlisted	
2011	David Harsent	Night	Faber & Faber	Shortlisted	
2011	John Kinsella	Armour (withdrawn by the author in protest)	Faber & Faber	Shortlisted	
2011	Esther Morgan	Grace	Bloodaxe Books	Shortlisted	
2011	Daljit Nagra	Tippoo Sultan's Incredible White-Man-Eating Tiger Toy-Machine!!!	Faber & Faber	Shortlisted	
2011	Sean O'Brien	November	Picador Poetry	Shortlisted	
2011	Bernard O'Donoghue	Farmer's Cross	Faber & Faber	Shortlisted	
2011	Alice Oswald	Memorial (withdrawn by the author in protest)	Faber & Faber	Shortlisted	
2012	Sharon Olds	Stag's Leap	Cape Poetry	Won	
2012	Simon Armitage	The Death of King Arthur	Faber & Faber	Shortlisted	
2012	Sean Borodale	Bee Journal	Cape Poetry	Shortlisted	
2012	Gillian Clarke	Ice	Carcanet Press	Shortlisted	
2012	Julia Copus	The World's Two Smallest Humans	Faber & Faber	Shortlisted	
2012	Paul Farley	The Dark Film	Picador Poetry	Shortlisted	
2012	Jorie Graham	P L A C E	Carcanet Press	Shortlisted	
2012	Kathleen Jamie	The Overhaul	Picador Poetry	Shortlisted	
2012	Jacob Polley	The Havocs	Picador Poetry	Shortlisted	
2012	Deryn Rees-Jones	Burying the Wren	Seren Books	Shortlisted	
2013	Sinéad Morrissey	Parallax	Carcanet Press	Won	
2013	Dannie Abse	Speak, Old Parrot	Hutchinson	Shortlisted	
2013	Moniza Alvi	At the Time of Partition	Bloodaxe Books	Shortlisted	
2013	Anne Carson	Red Doc>	Cape Poetry	Shortlisted	
2013	Helen Mort	Division Street	Chatto & Windus	Shortlisted	
2013	Daljit Nagra	Ramayana: A Retelling	Faber & Faber	Shortlisted	
2013	Maurice Riordan	The Water Stealer	Faber & Faber	Shortlisted	
2013	Robin Robertson	Hill of Doors	Picador Poetry	Shortlisted	
2013	Michael Symmons Roberts	Drysalter	Cape Poetry	Shortlisted	
2013	George Szirtes	Bad Machine	Bloodaxe Books	Shortlisted	
2014	David Harsent	Fire Songs	Faber & Faber	Won	
2014	Fiona Benson	Bright Travellers	Cape Poetry	Shortlisted	
2014	John Burnside	All One Breath	Cape Poetry	Shortlisted	
2014	Louise Glück	Faithful and Virtuous Night	Carcanet Press	Shortlisted	
2014	Michael Longley	The Stairwell	Cape Poetry	Shortlisted	
2014	Ruth Padel	Learning to Make an Oud in Nazareth	Chatto & Windus	Shortlisted	
2014	Pascale Petit	Fauverie	Poetry Wales Press	Shortlisted	
2014	Kevin Powers	Letter Composed During a Lull in the Fighting	Little, Brown / Sceptre	Shortlisted	
2014	Arundhathi Subramaniam	When God is a Traveller	Bloodaxe Books	Shortlisted	
2014	Hugo Williams	I Knew the Bride	Faber & Faber	Shortlisted	
2015	Sarah Howe	Loop of Jade	Chatto & Windus	Won	
2015	Mark Doty	Deep Lane	Cape Poetry	Shortlisted	
2015	Tracey Herd	Not in This World	Bloodaxe Books	Shortlisted	
2015	Selima Hill	Jutland	Bloodaxe Books	Shortlisted	
2015	Tim Liardet	The World Before Snow	Carcanet Press	Shortlisted	
2015	Les Murray	Waiting for the Past	Carcanet Press	Shortlisted	
2015	Sean O'Brien	The Beautiful Librarians	Picador Poetry	Shortlisted	
2015	Don Paterson	40 Sonnets	Faber & Faber	Shortlisted	
2015	Rebecca Perry	Beauty/Beauty	Bloodaxe Books	Shortlisted	
2015	Claudia Rankine	Citizen: An American Lyric	Penguin Poetry	Shortlisted	
2016	Jacob Polley	Jackself	Picador Poetry	Won	
2016	Rachael Boast	Void Studies	Picador Poetry	Shortlisted	
2016	Vahni Capildeo	Measures of Expatriation	Carcanet Press	Shortlisted	
2016	Ian Duhig	The Blind Road-Maker	Picador Poetry	Shortlisted	
2016	J. O. Morgan	Interference Pattern	Cape Poetry	Shortlisted	
2016	Bernard O'Donoghue	The Seasons of Cullen Church	Faber & Faber	Shortlisted	
2016	Alice Oswald	Falling Awake	Cape Poetry	Shortlisted	
2016	Denise Riley	Say Something Back	Picador Poetry	Shortlisted	
2016	Ruby Robinson	Every Little Sound	Pavilion / Liverpool University Press	Shortlisted	
2016	Katharine Towers	The Remedies	Picador Poetry	Shortlisted	
2017	Ocean Vuong	Night Sky with Exit Wounds	Cape Poetry	Won	
2017	Tara Bergin	The Tragic Death of Eleanor Marx	Carcanet Press	Shortlisted	
2017	Caroline Bird	In these Days of Prohibition	Carcanet Press	Shortlisted	
2017	Douglas Dunn	The Noise of a Fly	Faber & Faber	Shortlisted	
2017	Leontia Flynn	The Radio	Cape Poetry	Shortlisted	
2017	Roddy Lumsden	So Glad I'm Me	Bloodaxe Books	Shortlisted	
2017	Michael Symmons Roberts	Mancunia	Cape Poetry	Shortlisted	
2017	Robert Minhinnick	Diary of the Last Man	Carcanet Press	Shortlisted	
2017	James Sheard	The Abandoned Settlements	Cape Poetry	Shortlisted	
2017	Jacqueline Saphra	All My Mad Mothers	Nine Arches Press	Shortlisted	
2018	Hannah Sullivan	Three Poems	Faber & Faber	Won	
2018	Ailbhe Darcy	Insistence	Bloodaxe Books	Shortlisted	
2018	Terrance Hayes	American Sonnets for My Past and Future Assassins	Penguin Poetry	Shortlisted	
2018	Zaffar Kunial	Us	Faber & Faber	Shortlisted	
2018	Nick Laird	Feel Free	Faber & Faber	Shortlisted	
2018	Fiona Moore	The Distal Point	HappenStance	Shortlisted	
2018	Sean O'Brien	Europa	Picador Poetry	Shortlisted	
2018	Phoebe Power	Shrines of Upper Austria	Carcanet Press	Shortlisted	
2018	Richard Scott	Soho	Faber & Faber	Shortlisted	
2018	Tracy K. Smith	Wade in the Water	Penguin Poetry	Shortlisted	
2019	Roger Robinson	A Portable Paradise	Peepal Tree Press	Won	
2019	Anthony Anaxagorou	After the Formalities	Penned in the Margins	Shortlisted	
2019	Fiona Benson	Vertigo and Ghost	Cape Poetry	Shortlisted	
2019	Jay Bernard	Surge	Chatto & Windus	Shortlisted	
2019	Paul Farley	The Mizzy	Picador Poetry	Shortlisted	
2019	Ilya Kaminsky	Deaf Republic	Faber & Faber	Shortlisted	
2019	Sharon Olds	Arias	Cape Poetry	Shortlisted	
2019	Vidyan Ravinthiran	The Million-Petalled Flower of Being Here	Bloodaxe Books	Shortlisted	
2019	Deryn Rees-Jones	Erato	Seren Books	Shortlisted	
2019	Karen Solie	The Caiplie Caves	Picador Poetry	Shortlisted	

=== 2020s ===
Year	Author	Title	Publisher	Result	Ref
2020	Bhanu Kapil	How to Wash a Heart	Pavilion Poetry	Won	
2020	Natalie Diaz	Postcolonial Love Poem	Faber & Faber	Shortlisted	
2020	Sasha Dugdale	Deformations	Carcanet Press	Shortlisted	
2020	Ella Frears	Shine, Darling	Offord Road Books	Shortlisted	
2020	Will Harris	RENDANG	Granta Poetry	Shortlisted	
2020	Wayne Holloway-Smith	Love Minus Love	Bloodaxe Books	Shortlisted	
2020	Daisy Lafarge	Life Without Air	Granta Poetry	Shortlisted	
2020	Glyn Maxwell	How the Hell Are You	Picador Poetry	Shortlisted	
2020	Shane McCrae	Sometimes I Never Suffered	Corsair Poetry	Shortlisted	
2020	J. O. Morgan	The Martian's Regress	Cape Poetry	Shortlisted	
2021	Joelle Taylor	C+nto & Othered Poems	The Westbourne Press	Won	
2021	Raymond Antrobus	All the Names Given	Picador Poetry	Shortlisted	
2021	Kayo Chingonyi	A Blood Condition	Chatto & Windus	Shortlisted	
2021	Selima Hill	Men Who Feed Pigeons	Bloodaxe Books	Shortlisted	
2021	Victoria Kennefick	Eat or We Both Starve	Carcanet Press	Shortlisted	
2021	Hannah Lowe	The Kids	Bloodaxe Books	Shortlisted	
2021	Michael Symmons Roberts	Ransom	Cape Poetry	Shortlisted	
2021	Daniel Sluman	single window	Nine Arches Press	Shortlisted	
2021	Jack Underwood	A Year in the New Life	Faber & Faber	Shortlisted	
2021	Kevin Young	Stones	Cape Poetry	Shortlisted	
2022	Anthony Joseph	Sonnets for Albert	Bloomsbury	Won	
2022	Victoria Adukwei Bulley	Quiet	Faber & Faber	Shortlisted	
2022	Fiona Benson	Ephemeron	Cape Poetry	Shortlisted	
2022	Jemma Borg	Wilder	Pavilion Poetry	Shortlisted	
2022	Philip Gross	The Thirteenth Angel	Bloodaxe Books	Shortlisted	
2022	Zaffar Kunial	England's Green	Faber & Faber	Shortlisted	
2022	Mark Pajak	Slide	Cape Poetry	Shortlisted	
2022	James Conor Patterson	bandit country	Picador Poetry	Shortlisted	
2022	Denise Saul	The Room Between Us	Pavilion Poetry	Shortlisted	
2022	Yomi Sode	Manorism	Penguin	Shortlisted	
2023	Jason Allen-Paisant	Self-Portrait as Othello	Carcanet Press	Won	
2023	Joe Carrick-Varty	More Sky	Carcanet Press	Shortlisted	
2023	Jane Clarke	A Change in the Air	Bloodaxe Books	Shortlisted	
2023	Kit Fan	The Ink Cloud Reader	Carcanet Press	Shortlisted	
2023	Katie Farris	Standing in the Forest of Being Alive	Pavilion Poetry / Liverpool University Press	Shortlisted	
2023	Ishion Hutchinson	School of Instructions	Faber & Faber	Shortlisted	
2023	Fran Lock	Hyena!	Poetry Bus Press	Shortlisted	
2023	Eiléan Ní Chuilleanáin	The Map of the World	Gallery Press	Shortlisted	
2023	Sharon Olds	Balladz	Cape Poetry	Shortlisted	
2023	Abigail Parry	I Think We're Alone Now	Bloodaxe Books	Shortlisted	
2024	Peter Gizzi	Fierce Elegy	Penguin	Won	
2024	Raymond Antrobus	Signs, Music	Picador Poetry	Shortlisted	
2024	Hannah Copley	Lapwing	Pavilion Poetry / Liverpool University Press	Shortlisted	
2024	Helen Farish	The Penny Dropping	Bloodaxe Books	Shortlisted	
2024	Gustav Parker Hibbett	High Jump as Icarus Story	Banshee Press	Shortlisted	
2024	Rachel Mann	Eleanor Among the Saints	Carcanet Press	Shortlisted	
2024	Gboyega Odubanjo	Adam	Faber & Faber	Shortlisted	
2024	Carl Phillips	Scattered Snows, to the North	Carcanet Press	Shortlisted	
2024	Katrina Porteous	Rhizodont	Bloodaxe Books	Shortlisted	
2024	Karen McCarthy Woolf	Top Doll	Dialogue Books	Shortlisted	
2025	Karen Solie	Wellwater	Picador	Won	
2025	Gillian Allnutt	lode	Bloodaxe Books	Shortlisted	
2025	Isabelle Baafi	Chaotic Good	Faber & Faber	Shortlisted	
2025	Catherine-Esther Cowie	Heirloom	Carcanet Press	Shortlisted	
2025	Paul Farley	When It Rained for a Million Years	Picador	Shortlisted	
2025	Vona Groarke	Infinity Pool	Gallery Press	Shortlisted	
2025	Sarah Howe	Foretokens	Chatto & Windus	Shortlisted	
2025	Nick Makoha	The New Carthaginians	Penguin	Shortlisted	
2025	Tom Paulin	Namanlagh	Faber & Faber	Shortlisted	
2025	Natalie Shapero	Stay Dead	Out-Spoken Press	Shortlisted	

== List of judges ==
- 1993 – Peter Porter, Fleur Adcock, Edna Longley, Robert Crawford and John Lucas
- 1994 – Elaine Feinstein, Ciaran Carson, Robert Crawford, John Fuller and Candia McWilliam
- 1995 – James Fenton, Maura Dooley and Liz Lochhead
- 1996 – Andrew Motion, Helen Dunmore and Ruth Padel
- 1997 – Gillian Clarke, Sean O’Brien and Hugo Williams
- 1998 – Bernard O’Donoghue, Simon Armitage and Maura Dooley
- 1999 – Blake Morrison, Selima Hill and Jamie McKendrick
- 2000 – Paul Muldoon, Glyn Maxwell and Kathleen Jamie
- 2001 – John Burnside, Helen Dunmore and Maurice Riordan
- 2002 – Michael Longley, Fred D’Aguiar and Deryn Rees-Jones
- 2003 – David Harsent, Mimi Khalvati and George Szirtes
- 2004 – Douglas Dunn, Paul Farley and Carol Rumens
- 2005 – David Constantine, Kate Clanchy and Jane Draycott
- 2006 – Sophie Hannah, Gwyneth Lewis and Sean O'Brien
- 2007 – Sujata Bhatt, W. N. Herbert and Peter Porter
- 2008 – Lavinia Greenlaw, Tobias Hill and Andrew Motion
- 2009 – Simon Armitage, Colette Bryce and Penelope Shuttle
- 2010 – Bernardine Evaristo, Anne Stevenson and Michael Symmons Roberts
- 2011 – Gillian Clarke, Stephen Knight and Dennis O'Driscoll
- 2012 – Carol Ann Duffy, Michael Longley and David Morley
- 2013 – Imtiaz Dharker, Ian Duhig and Vicki Feaver
- 2014 – Sean Borodale, Helen Dunmore and Fiona Sampson
- 2015 – Kei Miller, Pascale Petit and Ahren Warner
- 2016 – Julia Copus, Ruth Padel and Alan Gillis
- 2017 – W. N. Herbert, James Lasdun and Helen Mort
- 2018 – Clare Pollard, Sinéad Morrissey and Daljit Nagra
- 2019 – John Burnside, Sarah Howe and Nick Makoha
- 2020 – Lavinia Greenlaw, Mona Arshi and Andrew McMillan
- 2021 – Glyn Maxwell, Caroline Bird and Zaffar Kunial
- 2022 – Jean Sprackland, Hannah Lowe and Roger Robinson
- 2023 – Paul Muldoon, Sasha Dugdale and Denise Saul
- 2024 – Mimi Khalvati, Anthony Joseph and Hannah Sullivan
- 2025 – Patience Agbabi, Niall Campbell and Michael Hofmann

== See also ==
- List of British literary awards
- List of poetry awards
- List of literary awards
- English poetry
- English literature
- British literature
- List of years in literature
- List of years in poetry
