= Fire Songs =

2014 poetry collection by David Harsent

- Author: David Harsent
- Language: English
- Subject: Poetry > Subjects & Themes > General
- Genre: Poetry
- Publisher: Faber and Faber
- Publication date: 2014
- Pages: 66
- ISBN: 9780571316090

Fire Songs is a collection of poetry written by English poet David Harsent that uses multiple themes to display a greater meaning. It was published in 2014, and it won the T. S. Eliot Prize that year. It is the 11th collection of poems that Harsent has published.

== Overview ==
Fire Songs, according to Fiona Sampson, a British poet and a judge for the 2015 T. S. Eliot Prize, teems with images and ideas that manage to be both richly detailed and vividly musical. The entire book reads as a triumphantly sustained sequence and is layered with leitmotifs. It is denser and more composed than its prize-winning predecessors Legion (2005) and Night (2010). The four "Fire" sequences all have a common theme, destruction. Martyrdom, war, the loss of love and environmental apocalypse end each sequence to repeat the threat "it will be fire". Other recurring themes are rats, tinnitus, war, and environmental damage. Harsent, who suffers from tinnitus, said he "wrote them [the poems] in a fever".

== Structure ==
=== Fire: a song for Mistress Askew ===
- The Fool Alone
- Bowland Beth
- Sang The Rat
- Tinnitus: August, sun beating the rooftops
- A Dream Book
- Leechdoms and Starcrafts
- The Fool at Court

=== Fire: love songs and descants ===
- Effacted
- Tinnitus: May, low skies and thunder
- Rat Again
- Armistice

=== Fire: end-scenes and outtakes ===
- Trickster Christ
- Dive
- Songs from the Same Earth
- Tinnitus: January, thin rain becoming ice

=== Fire: a party at the world's end ===
- Icefield
- M.A.D. 1971 (Rat-run)
- Pain

== Content ==
"Fire: a song for Mistress Askew" is set in London, England, and follows Anne Askew, an English writer and Protestant Martyr who was condemned for being a heretic during the dynasty of Henry VIII, and became the only woman in English history to be tortured in the Tower of London and burnt at the stake. Harsent describes the execution of Askew because "She was an example of the destructiveness of fire". "Fire: love songs and descants", according to The Guardian reviewer Adam Newey, has a "hellish for-its-own-sake purity, which is nonetheless impressive and mesmerizing", and like the Askew group includes a bonfire to introduce the poem's subject matter. In this poem, the speaker is burning works of arts and literature, and burning of the written word is a recurrent motif. It reveals the theme the loss of love as the speaker no longer loves literature. In an interview with Prospect, Harsent commented on the bonfire motif in Fire Songs: "I had this image in my head of a man going into his garden and making a bonfire on which he planned to burn everything".

The poem "Tinnitus" addresses Harsent's musical career; Harsent frequently collaborates with British composer Harrison Birtwistle, and Harsent dedicated the volume to him. The poem "Armistice" consists of one single sentence, without punctuation, organized in couplets all of which rhyme on the sound of the letter "d". Newey called this a "virtuosic piece" that "disdains simplistic notions about peace and war and has the humility to acknowledge the limits of art".

== Reception ==
Adam Newey, in The Guardian, said the collection "makes rich use of symbol, especially biblical symbol, and reads somewhat like a modern-day Book of Revelation – there’s definitely something of the entranced, ecstatic visionary in some of the bravura pieces here". He added that it "delivers a stream of feverish, oneiric visions, of apocalypse brought about through war or environmental catastrophe or the boundless human capacity for self‑deception and bedevilment". According to Helen Dunmore, a British poet and the chair of judges that awarded Harsent the T. S. Eliot Prize, "Fire Songs plumbs language and emotion with technical brilliance and prophetic power".
