= The Water Table =

2009 poetry collection by Philip Gross

The Water Table is a collection of poetry written by Philip Gross in 2009, published by Bloodaxe Books. It won the 2009 T. S. Eliot Prize.

== Themes ==
In her review in The Guardian, Polly Clark states that Gross did not compare water in traditional metaphors but instead the intrinsic physical properties of water itself. She noted that the poems were written not only with educated, technical terms and knowledge but with common everyday phrases. Mentioning the balance of these writing methods mirrors the poems' focus on the trans-formative nature of water which constantly changes states. From his interview with Gross, Stephen Adams of The Telegraph writes: "At its heart is a simple theme - the ever changing nature of water. But Gross said that the whole world - both natural and man-made - could be reflected in that liquid mirror."

== Awards ==
Gross was given the T. S. Eliot Prize by Valerie Eliot, T. S. Eliot's widow, in London. Gross expressed his astonishment at winning the award over more celebrated poets including three former T. S. Eliot Prize winners.
