= Joe Carrick-Varty =

British-Irish poet

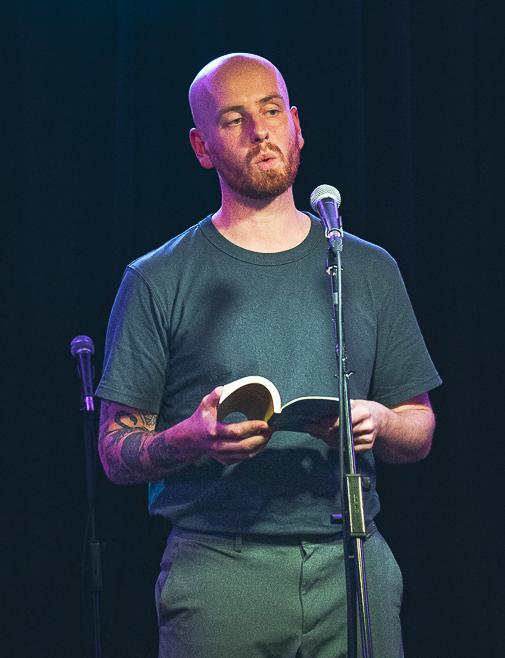
- Born: 1993 (age 32–33)
- Education: University of Manchester
- Occupations: Poet and editor

Joe Carrick-Varty is a British-Irish poet from Oxford, England. His debut collection More Sky (2023) was shortlisted for the 2023 T. S. Eliot Prize. His pamphlet Somewhere Far (2019) won The Poetry Business's New Poets Prize.

In 2022, Carrick-Varty received an Eric Gregory Award from the Society of Authors, and in 2023 he was named Anthony Burgess Fellow in Creative Writing at the University of Manchester. His collection Before Violence (2026) was selected as a Poetry Book Society spring recommendation.

== Biography ==
Carrick-Varty was born in 1993. He holds a BA in English Literature/Creative Writing and an MA in Creative Writing from the University of Manchester. He is a co-founding editor of online poetry magazine bath magg and a book reviewer for P.N. Review.

In 2019, Carrick-Varty founded bath magg, which published work by poets including Bhanu Kapil, Vona Groarke, Kim Addonizio, and Ilya Kaminsky. In August 2023, the magazine entered a hiatus following the death of poet Gboyega Odubanjo at Shambala Festival. Carrick-Varty later wrote an essay remembering Odubanjo for Poetry Foundation, stating: “When a person dies, especially so young, they’re often mythologized … but I don’t want to mythologize Gboyega’s life, because he was my friend; he was so much more than a poet.”

His first book, More Sky, was named one of the best new poetry collections of 2023 by The Irish Times and was shortlisted for the T.S. Eliot Prize. It was later shortlisted for the Michael Murphy Memorial Poetry Prize in 2025.

Carrick-Varty's poems have appeared in Granta, the New Statesman, Poetry Review and Poetry Ireland Review.

== Works ==
=== Books ===
- Before Violence (Carcanet, 2026) — ISBN 9781800175426
- More Sky (Carcanet, 2023) — ISBN 9781800173019

=== Pamphlets ===
- 54 Questions for the Man Who Sold a Shotgun to My Father (Out-Spoken Press, 2020) — ISBN 9781838021139
- Somewhere Far (The Poetry Business, 2019) — ISBN 9781912196692

== Honors and awards ==
- 2019 – Poetry Business New Poets Prize, for Somewhere Far
- 2022 – Eric Gregory Award
- 2023 – Highly Commended, Forward Prize for Best Single Poem (Written)
- 2023 – Shortlisted, The London Magazine Poetry Prize
- 2023 – Shortlisted, T. S. Eliot Prize, for More Sky
- 2025 – Shortlisted, Michael Murphy Memorial Poetry Prize, for More Sky
- 2026 – Poetry Book Society Spring Recommendation, for Before Violence
