= Hannah Copley =

British poet, writer and lecturer (born 1988)

- Copley in 2025
- Born: Hannah Louise Copley; 1988 (age 37–38)
- Education: University of Leeds (BA, MA, PhD)
- Occupations: Poet, Lecturer
- Writing career
- Genre: Poetry
- Notable work: Lapwing
- Website: hannahcopley.wordpress.com

Hannah Copley (born 1988) is an English poet and lecturer in Creative Writing at the University of Westminster. She is a poetry editor and director at the literary magazine Stand, and the author of two poetry collections, including Lapwing, which was a Poetry Book Society Summer 2024 Recommendation, the second-place winner in the 2024 Laurel Prize, and was nominated for the 2024 T.S. Eliot Prize.

== Education ==
Copley is from Hertfordshire. Copley graduated with a Bachelor of Arts (BA) in English and History and a Master of Arts (MA) in English Literature, both from the University of Leeds. Her doctoral studies on the poetry of Jon Silkin, Geoffrey Hill, and Tony Harrison in the School of English at Leeds was funded by an AHRC block grant.

== Career ==
Following her PhD, Copley has worked in small press publishing, taught Creative Writing at Birkbeck College, University of London, where she joined in 2018, and has taught at the University of Westminster since January 2019.

Copley has published work in Poetry, The London Magazine, Poetry Birmingham, and elsewhere. She runs poetry events at the Soho Poly in London and is a poetry editor at Stand, where she first started as a student volunteer. She was awarded the YorkMix Poetry Prize in 2018 and the Newcastle Poetry Prize in 2019, and was one of the festival artists for StAnza in 2025. In 2025, she also judged the Ware Poets Open Competition.

Copley, noted as an "award-winning ecopoet", has authored two poetry collections: Speculum with Broken Sleep Books in 2021, and Lapwing with Pavilion Poetry in 2024. Speculum, her first collection which includes "[a] number of poems deal with childbirth and other pregnancy events, including maternal deaths", was praised for "a conversational style" and the poet's direct language. It was also one of the Osmosis Picks of 2021 for, among other things, its "vivid imagery of gynaecological tools", and the poet Rushika Wick called it "a research-based yet imaginative poetic exploration of the treatment of the female body through time" and praised Copley's "precise" writing.

Lapwing, her second collection, was a Poetry Book Society Summer 2024 Recommendation, won the second prize as part of the Laurel Prize in 2024, and was on the shortlist for the 2024 T.S. Eliot Prize, judged by Mimi Khalvati (chair), Anthony Joseph and Hannah Sullivan. It is "a book that tries, through naming and through language, to bring back something, or someone, that is absent", and has been praised as "a vivid and incantatory sequence." Writing for the Times Literary Supplement, Lenni Sanders noted the poems in the collection present themselves as "historical documents or ornithologists' notes". Writing for The Friday Poem, Matthew Paul called it "a creative enterprise", and said that it is "rooted in the mundane struggle for existence in Britain." John Field, on the T. S. Eliot Prize website, notes that Lapwing is "a sombre skein of poems" exploring "the challenges of the natural world" and more. Other reviews have called this "bleak yet beautiful bird biography" in the form of a poetry collection "ambitious" and "a book about transformation." Dominic Leonard also praised Copley for successfully "contrasting the more imaginative and rich flights of language with blunt returns to earth". Lapwing has also been praised for its "balancing act" where "the lapwing figure is anthropomorphised or a human being is birdified".

== Personal life ==
Copley has two children. She suffered from hyperemesis gravidarum during her pregnancy in 2016, and has written extensively about it. Her poem "Haworth, 1855", which was inspired by this "gruelling illness", won the YorkMix Poetry Prize in 2018.

== Works ==
- Speculum (Broken Sleep Books, 2021) ISBN 9781913642556
- Lapwing (Pavilion Poetry, LUP, 2024) ISBN 9781802074758
- Hertz, with Alycia Pirmohamed (Dialect Press, 2025)

== Awards ==
- 2018: YorkMix / York Literature Festival Poetry Prize, for "Haworth, 1855"
- 2019: Newcastle Poetry Prize, for "Juice"
- 2024: Poetry Book Society Summer Recommendation, for Lapwing
- 2024: Second Prize, Laurel Prize
- 2024: Shortlisted, T.S. Eliot Prize
