= Tim Liardet =

British poet (born 1949)

Tim Liardet FRSL
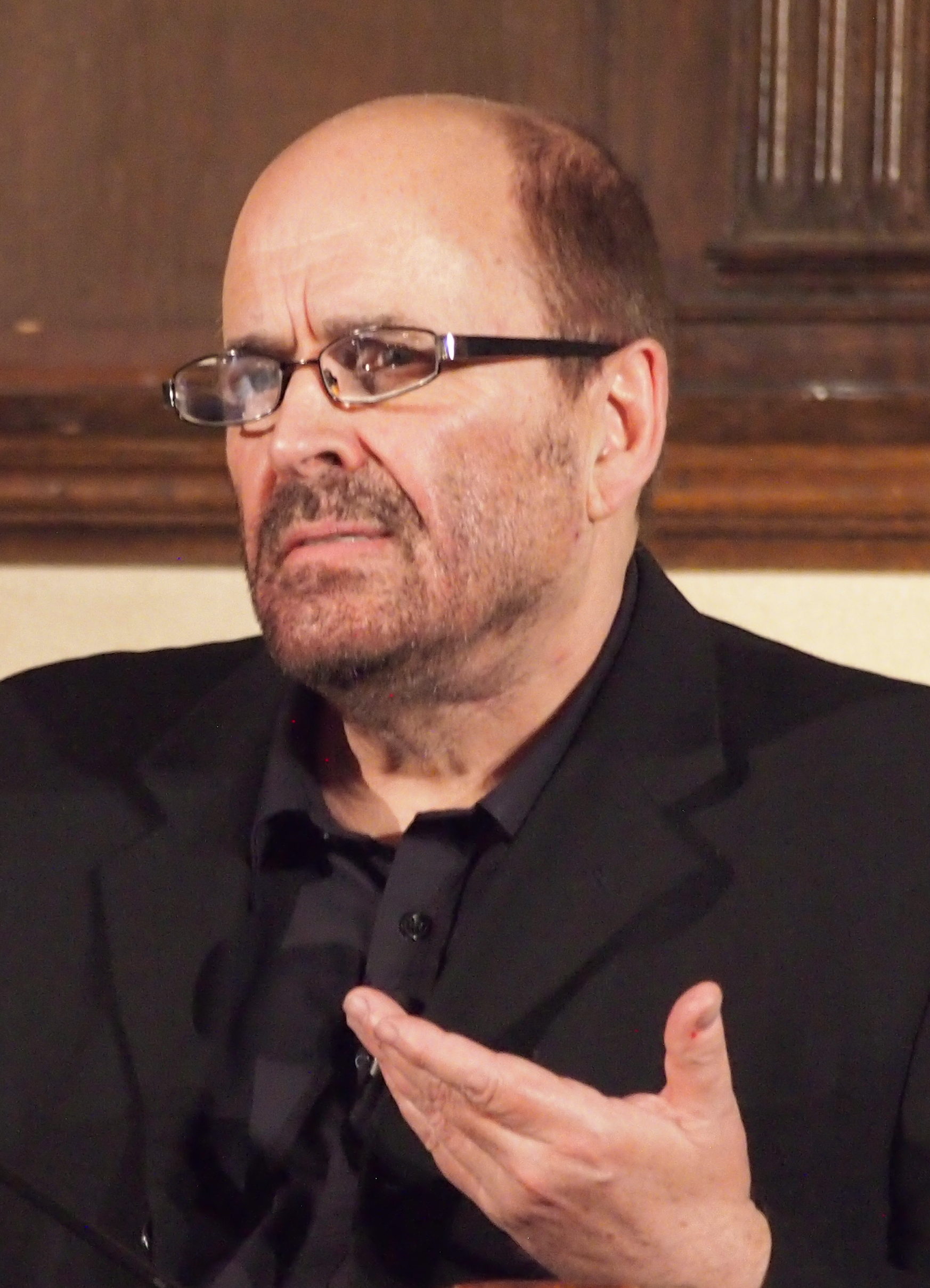
- Liardet in 2016.
- Born: 1949 (age 76–77); London
- Writing career
- Genre: Poetry

Tim Liardet is a poet twice nominated for the T. S. Eliot Prize, a critic, and Professor of Poetry at Bath Spa University.

He was born in London in 1949, and has produced eleven collections of poetry to date.

In 2026, Liardet was elected a Fellow of the Royal Society of Literature (FRSL).

== Biography ==
Clay Hill, his first collection, appeared in 1988. Fellini Beach, his second collection, appeared in 1994. His third collection, Competing with the Piano Tuner, was a Poetry Book Society Special Commendation and longlisted for the Whitbread Poetry Prize in 1998; his fourth, To the God of Rain, a Poetry Book Society recommendation for Spring 2003. Liardet was awarded a Hawthornden Fellowship in 2002.

He has reviewed poetry for such journals as The Guardian, Poetry Review, and P. N. Review and was poet-in-residence at The Guardian in 2006. The Blood Choir, his fifth collection, won an Arts Council England Writer's Award as a collection-in-progress in 2003, was a Poetry Book Society Recommendation for summer 2006, and was shortlisted for the 2006 T. S. Eliot Prize for the best collection of poetry for that year. "Priest Skear", a pamphlet that turns the drowning of the 23 Chinese cocklepickers in Morecambe Bay in 2004 into a political allegory, appeared in 2010 and was the Poetry Book Society Pamphlet Choice for Winter 2010. The Storm House, his eighth collection, a book-length elegy for his brother who died young and in mysterious circumstances, appeared from Carcanet Press in June 2011. Madame Sasoo Goes Bathing, a pamphlet, appeared in 2013. His The World Before Snow, a study of a life-changing love affair between An American and an English poet who met during a record-breaking snowstorm in Boston, appeared from Carcanet Press in 2015 and was shortlisted for the T. S. Eliot Prize of the same year. Arcimboldo's Bulldog: New and Selected Poems appeared from the same publisher in 2018.

Liardet has sat on various panels and delivered papers on contemporary poetry at the AWP Conference in New York City in 2008, in Chicago in 2009, in Washington, D.C. in 2011 and in Boston in 2013. He has also performed his own work widely: he has read at the Royal Festival Hall, on BBC Radio Three and BBC Radio Four, at the Ars Interpres Festival, Stockholm, in 2007, as visiting poet at the Internationales Literaturfestival Berlin in 2008, and has read extensively in America, including such venues as Cambridge Public Library in Boston, the Lannan Centre for Poetics and Social Practice at Georgetown University in Washington, D.C. and the KGB Bar and Cornelia Street Cafe in New York City.

== Bibliography ==
- Clay Hill, Seren, 1988, ISBN 0907476880
- Fellini Beach, Seren, 1994, ISBN 1854111159
- Competing with the Piano Tuner, Seren, 1998, ISBN 9781854112279
- The Uses of Pepper, Smith/Doorstop, 2006, ISBN 1902382560
- To the God of Rain, Seren, 2003, ISBN 9781854113351
- The Blood Choir, Seren, 2006, ISBN 9781854114143
- Priest Skear, Shoestring Press, 2010, ISBN 9781907356094
- The Storm House, Carcanet, 2011, ISBN 9781847770677
- Madame Sasoo Goes Bathing, Shoestring Press, 2013, ISBN 9781907356643
- The World Before Snow, Carcanet, 2015, ISBN 9781847772091
- Arcimboldo's Bulldog: New and Selected Poems, Carcanet, 2018, ISBN 9781784105709

== Prizes and awards ==
- Society of Authors Writer's Award, 1996–7
- Poetry Book Society Special Commendation, Spring 1998 (Competing with the Piano Tuner)
- Whitbread Poetry Prize Longlist, 1999
- Royal Literary Fund Award, 2000
- Hawthornden Fellowship, 2002
- Poetry Book Society Recommendation, Spring 2003 (To the God of Rain)
- Poetry Business Book and Pamphlet Competition winner, 2003 (The Uses of Pepper)
- Arts Council Writer's Award, 2003
- Poetry Book Society Recommendation, Summer 2006 (The Blood Choir)
- T. S. Eliot Prize (Shortlist), 2006, (The Blood Choir)
- Pushcart Nomination, 2008, (The Law of Primogeniture)
- Pushcart Nomination, 2009, (The Storm House)
- Poetry Book Pamphlet Choice, 2010, (Priest Skear)
- T. S. Eliot Prize (Shortlist), 2015 (The World Before Snow)
- Pushcart Prize Nomination, 2018 (The World's First Photograph)
- Elected Fellow of the Royal Society of Literature (FRSL), 2026
