= Jacqueline Saphra =

Poet and writer

Jacqueline Saphra is a poet and writer. Her debut collection The Kitchen of Lovely Contraptions (flipped eye, 2011) was nominated for the Aldeburgh Prize. Works since then include If I Lay on my Back I Saw Nothing but Naked Women (2017, winner of the Saboteur Award)and A Bargain with the Light: Poems after Lee Miller (2017, nominated for the Saboteur Award).

Her collection All My Mad Mothers was shortlisted for the T. S. Eliot Prize. Her series of poems, performed with Benjamin Tassie's Musical Miniatures for cello and piano, won the Best Collaborative Work in the Saboteur Awards.

Saphra lives in London. She graduated in drama, has a diploma in playwriting, a degree in scriptwriting from The National Film School and an MPhil in creative writing.

== Critical reception ==
The Sunday Times described All My Mad Mothers as a work that "explores love, sex and family relationships in vivacious, lush poems" that "tread a tantalising tightrope". The Daily Telegraph described it as, "a kind of autobiography in verse, moving from childhood memories of her anxious mother ("sat in the corner clutching her old skates and dispensing strings of aphorisms") through to her own motherhood, with a touching sonnet for her son."

The Scotsman called A Bargain with the Light, a sonnet inspired by the work of model and photographer Lee Miller, "powerful."
