= Fran Lock =

British poet, author, and academic

- Born: United Kingdom
- Education: Birkbeck, University of London (PhD)
- Writing career
- Genres: Poetry, lyric essay
- Subjects: Working-class identity, queer identity, trauma, Traveller heritage
- Notable works: Hyena! (2023); White/ Other (2022)
- Notable awards: T. S. Eliot Prize (shortlisted, 2023)

Fran Lock is a British poet, author, and academic known for her works exploring working-class life, queer identity, and Traveller heritage. In 2023, her poetry collection Hyena! was shortlisted for the T. S. Eliot Prize.

== Early life and education ==
Lock was born in the United Kingdom and raised with a strong Irish and Traveller cultural background. She spent part of her early childhood in Shetland before her family adopted a more itinerant lifestyle, an experience she credits with shaping her relationship to language and marginalisation. She completed a practice-based PhD at Birkbeck, University of London, where her research focused on the epistolary form, contemporary poetry, mourning, and trauma.

== Career and critical reception ==
Lock has authored over ten poetry collections. Her work frequently uses themes of animality and the "feral" to examine societal marginalisation, capitalism, and gender. She frequently uses the motif of the hyena and the dog to represent working-class and female scavengers trespassing in cultural spaces.

Her 2022 collection White/ Other was selected as a Poetry Book Society Recommendation and was featured in The Guardian's best recent poetry review roundup.

From 2022 to 2023, Lock served as the Judith E. Wilson Poetry Fellow at the University of Cambridge. During her tenure, she researched feral subjectivity through the lens of the medieval bestiary.

In 2023, her collection Hyena! was shortlisted for the T. S. Eliot Prize.

In addition to her poetry, Lock is an associate editor at the radical arts and culture cooperative Culture Matters, and she edits the "Soul Food" column for the Communist Review.

== Selected works ==
- The Mystic and the Pig Thief (Salt Publishing, 2014)
- Dogtooth (Out-Spoken Press, 2017)
- Contains Mild Peril (Out-Spoken Press, 2019)
- Hyena! Jackal! Dog! (Pamenar Press, 2021)
- White/ Other (87 Press, 2022)
- Hyena! (Poetry Bus Press, 2023)
- Vulgar Errors / Feral Subjects (Out-Spoken Press, 2023)
