= Helen Farish =

British poet (born 1962)

Helen Farish (born 1962) is a British poet.

== Life ==
She received her B.A. from University of Durham, M.A. and Ph.D. from Oxford Brookes University.

She lectured in creative writing at Sheffield Hallam University.

She has been a Fellow at Hawthornden International Centre for Writers and was the first female Poet in Residence at the Wordsworth Trust (2004–5). She has also been a visiting lecturer at Sewanee University, and a visiting scholar at the University of New Hampshire.

Beginning 2007, she lectures full-time at Lancaster University, in the department of English and Creative Writing.

She now lives in Cumbria.

== Awards ==
- Intimates 2005 Forward Prize for Best First Collection, shortlist for the 2005 T. S. Eliot Prize.
- The Penny Dropping 2024, shortlist for the 2024 T.S. Eliot Prize.

== Works ==
=== Collections ===
- Intimates. Cape Poetry. 2005. ISBN 978-0-224-07279-3.
- A Winter Garland (2006)
- Nocturnes at Nohant: The Decade of Chopin and Sand (2012)
- The Dog of Memory (2016)
- The Penny Dropping (2024)

=== Thesis ===
- Sex, God and Grief in the Poetry of Sharon Olds and Louise Glück
