= Jacob Polley =

British poet and novelist (born 1975)

- Born: 1975 (age 50–51); Carlisle, Cumbria, England
- Education: Lancaster University
- Occupations: Poet, novelist
- Writing career
- Notable works: Talk of the Town; Jackself
- Notable awards: Somerset Maugham Award (2009); T. S. Eliot Prize (2017)
- Website: Polley's website

Jacob Polley (born 1975) is a British poet and novelist. He has published five collections of poetry. His novel, Talk of the Town, won the Somerset Maugham Award in 2009. His fourth poetry collection, Jackself, won the T. S. Eliot Prize in 2016. Polley has co-written two short films and collaborated on multimedia poetry installations in the United Kingdom.

== Early life and education ==
Jacob Polley was born in 1975 in Carlisle, United Kingdom. He grew up in Bowness-on-Solway, He studied English at Lancaster University from 1993 to 1996 and earned an MA in English and creative writing at the university in 1997.

== Career ==
After graduation, Polley worked in various jobs, eventually landing the position of poet-in-residence at the Cumberland News in Carlisle. He taught poetry in local schools and later was awarded a two-year fellowship at Trinity College, Cambridge. He was poet-in-residence at the Wordsworth Trust in 2002.

Polley published his first poetry collection, The Brink, (Picador UK) in 2003. The collection was a Poetry Book Society Choice, and went on to be shortlisted for the T. S. Eliot Prize. From 2005 to 2007, Polley was a Visiting Fellow Commoner in the Arts at Trinity College.

Polley's second collection, Little Gods (Picador UK, 2006), was a Poetry Book Society Recommendation. In 2009, Polley published his first novel, Talk of the Town. The book was published in 2009 by Picador UK and went on to win the 2010 Somerset Maugham Award and was also shortlisted for the Desmond Elliott Prize. In 2010, Polley was offered a position as lecturer at University of St. Andrews. In 2011, Polley was invited to Australia to be Arts Queensland's poet-in-residence.

The Havocs (Pickador UK, 2012), is Polley's third collection of poetry. It was a Poetry Book Society Recommendation and won the 2012 Geoffrey Faber Memorial Prize. It was also shortlisted for the Forward Prize for Best Collection and for the T. S. Eliot Prize in 2012.

Polley partnered with director Ian Fenton as co-writer on two short films, Flickerman and the Ivory-Skinned Woman (2002) and Keeping House (2015).

Jackself, Polley's fourth collection of poetry, published in 2016 by Picador UK, won the prestigious T. S. Eliot Prize in 2016. Polley's collection was described by judges as "a firework of a book".

In 2017, Polley collaborated with Dutch musicians, Strijbos and Van Rijswijk, to make 'To Travel and to Matter' - a poetry and sound installation project for the Lake District."

Polley is Professor of Creative Writing at Newcastle University and lives on the North-East coast of England.

== Selected publications ==
- Material Properties, (Picador UK, 2023), ISBN 9781035000081
- Jackself, (Picador UK, 2016), ISBN 9781447290452
- The Havocs, (Picador UK, 2012), ISBN 9781447207030
- Talk of the Town, (Picador UK, 2009), ISBN 9780330509930
- Little Gods, (Picador UK, 2006), ISBN 9780330444200
- The Brink, (Picador UK, 2003), ISBN 9780330412889

== Screenwriting ==
- Keeping House, with co-writer and director, Ian Fenton, (2015), Short film
- Flickerman and the Ivory-skinned Woman, with co-writer and director Ian Fenton, (2002), Short film

== Awards ==
- Elected Fellow of the Royal Society of Literature (2024)
- T. S. Eliot Prize, Jackself, (2016)
- Forward Poetry for Best Collection, The Havocs, (2013)
- Shortlisted for the T. S. Eliot Prize, The Havocs, (2012)
- Geoffrey Faber Memorial Prize, The Havocs, (2012)
- Somerset Maugham Award for Talk of the Town, (2010)
- Selected one of Next Generation Poets from the Poetry Book Society, (2004)
- Shortlisted for the T. S. Eliot Prize, The Brink, (2012)
- Eric Gregory Award from the Society of Authors, (2002)
