= List of British literary awards =

This is a list of British literary awards.

== Current awards ==
=== Literature in general ===
- Barbellion Prize, for ill and disabled writers
- Bristol Festival of Ideas Book Prize, for a book which "presents new, important and challenging ideas"
- British Book Awards, the "Nibbies" (formerly the Galaxy National Book Awards)
- International Rubery Book Award
- James Tait Black Memorial Prize
- Jhalak Prize
- John Llewellyn Rhys Prize
- Ondaatje Prize
- Orwell Prize
- Portico Prize, for literature that "evokes the spirit of the North"
- Scotland's National Book Awards (formerly the Saltire Society Literary Awards)
- Somerset Maugham Award
- The People's Book Prize, judged by readers (six awards include the Frederick Forsyth Award for Fiction, Non-Fiction Award, Children's Literature Award, the Beryl Bainbridge Award for a First-Time Author, Best Achievement Award, and Best Publisher Award)
- Wales Book of the Year
- Warwick Prize for Writing
- Wellcome Book Prize

=== Fiction ===
- Bath Novel Award
- Bridport Prize
- Booker Prize (formerly the Man Booker Prize)
- Goldsmiths Prize
- Grindstone International Novel Prize
- Hawthornden Prize
- Republic of Consciousness Prize for small presses
- The Writers' Prize (formerly known as Rathbones Folio Prize)
- Women's Prize for Fiction (formerly, Orange Prize for Fiction)

=== First novel ===
- Authors' Club Best First Novel Award
- Betty Trask Prize and Awards
- Desmond Elliott Prize
- Waterstones Debut Fiction Prize

=== Humour ===
- Bollinger Everyman Wodehouse Prize
- Comedy Women in Print Prize, the UK and Ireland's first comedy literary prize for women writers

=== Crime fiction ===
- CWA Ian Fleming Steel Dagger, for a thriller
- CWA International Dagger, for a translated crime novel
- CWA New Blood Dagger, for a debut crime novel
- Dagger in the Library, for a crime writer, chosen by librarians
- Gold Dagger, for a crime novel
- McIlvanney Prize, for a Scottish crime novel
- Theakston's Old Peculier Crime Novel of the Year Award

=== Speculative fiction ===
- Arthur C. Clarke Award
- British Fantasy Award
- BSFA Awards
- David Gemmell Awards for Fantasy

=== Historical fiction ===
- Walter Scott Prize

=== Young adult and children fiction ===
- Bath Children's Novel Award
- Branford Boase Award
- Stockport Children's Book Awards

=== Poetry ===
- Alice Hunt Bartlett Prize
- Arvon International Poetry Prize
- Bridport Poetry Prize
- Cholmondeley Award
- Christopher Tower Poetry Prizes
- Eric Gregory Award
- Forward Prizes for Poetry
- Gaisford Prize
- Geoffrey Faber Memorial Prize
- Hippocrates Prize for Poetry and Medicine
- International Book & Pamphlet Competition
- Michael Marks Awards for Poetry Pamphlets
- National Poetry Competition
- New Poets Prize
- Newdigate Prize
- Poetry Book Awards
- Poetry London Prize
- King's Gold Medal for Poetry
- T. S. Eliot Prize
- Ted Hughes Award
- Welsh Poetry Competition

=== Non-fiction ===
- Alan Ball Local History Awards
- Baillie Gifford Prize
- Bread and Roses Award, for radical, left-wing writing
- British Academy Book Prize for Global Cultural Understanding
- CWA Gold Dagger for Non-Fiction, for a work of crime non-fiction
- Duff Cooper Prize
- Hessell-Tiltman Prize, for a work of historical content and high literary merit
- James Tait Black Memorial Prize, for biography
- Orwell Prize for Political Writing
- Royal Society Insight investment Science Book Prize for popular science
- Slightly Foxed Best First Biography Prize, for biography or memoir
- Wainwright Prize, for outdoors, nature, UK-based travel writing
- Whitfield Book Prize, for history
- William Hill Sports Book of the Year
- Wolfson History Prize
- Women’s Prize for Non-Fiction

=== Other ===
- The Barker Book Awards
- Brunel University African Poetry Prize
- Caine Prize for African Fiction
- Commonwealth Short Story Prize, for unpublished short fiction (2,000–5,000 words)
- The Literary Encyclopedia, for academic monographs and scholarly editions
- SI Leeds Literary Prize, for unpublished fiction (more than 30,000 words) by Black and Asian women in the UK
- Queen Mary Wasafiri New Writing Prize, judged in three categories: fiction, poetry, and life writing; open to anyone who has not published a complete book

== Discontinued ==
=== Literature ===
- Costa Book Awards (discontinued)

=== Fiction ===
- Commonwealth Writers Prize (discontinued)
- Dundee International Book Prize (discontinued)
- Geoffrey Faber Memorial Prize (discontinued)
- Ruth Hadden Memorial Award (discontinued)
- WH Smith Literary Award (discontinued)
- Winifred Holtby Memorial Prize (discontinued)

=== First novel ===
- Guardian First Book Award
- Waverton Good Read Award

=== Speculative fiction ===
- Kitschies (discontinued)

=== Nonfiction ===
- NCR Book Award (discontinued)

== See also ==
- List of literary awards
- British literature
- English literature
- Scottish literature
- Welsh-language literature
- Welsh literature in English
- List of years in literature
- List of years in poetry
