= J. O. Morgan =

Scottish poet, born 1978

- Born: 1978 (age 47–48); Edinburgh, Scotland
- Occupation: Poet
- Writing career
- Notable works: At Maldon, Assurances, The Martian's Regress
- Notable awards: Costa Poetry Award

J. O. Morgan (born 1978) is an author from Edinburgh, Scotland. The seventh of his volumes of verse, The Martian's Regress (2020), is set in the far future, when humans "lose their humanity." He has also published two novels: Pupa (2021) and Appliance (2022).

== Works ==
Each of Morgan's seven poetry volumes is a single book-length work. His fifth, Interference Pattern, was shortlisted for the T. S. Eliot Prize and his first, Natural Mechanical, won the Aldeburgh Poetry Prize in 2009.

The third work, At Maldon (2014), revisits the Old English epic "The Battle of Maldon", detailing events that took place on the Essex coast in 991 CE. A recording of Morgan reading it was made for the Poetry Archive in 2014. He has recited the whole work from memory on several occasions.

Royal Air Force involvement in maintaining the Airborne Nuclear Deterrent in the early Cold War period forms the basis for Morgan's sixth publication, Assurances (2018). Morgan's father was in the RAF and he worked with Britain's nuclear deterrent. It was shortlisted for the Forward Prize and won the Costa Poetry Award, when the judges praised it as "original, compelling, ambitious, highly accomplished and marvellously sustained".

Morgan's seventh volume of poetry, The Martian's Regress (2020), is set in the far future. It considers "what humans become when they lose their humanity," and explores "what a fragile environment eventually makes of those who persist in tampering with it."

== Publications ==
=== Poetry ===
- Natural Mechanical (CB editions 2009). ISBN 9780955728594
- Long Cuts (CB editions, 2011). ISBN 9780956735928
- At Maldon (CB editions, 2013). ISBN 9780957326651
- In Casting Off (HappenStance Press, 2015). ISBN 9781910131152
- Interference Pattern (Jonathan Cape, 2016). ISBN 9781910702024
- Assurances (Jonathan Cape, 2018). ISBN 9781787330856
- The Martian's Regress (Jonathan Cape, 2020). ISBN 9781787332140

=== Novels ===
- Pupa (Henningham Family Press, 2021) ISBN 9781916218635
- Appliance (Jonathan Cape, 2022). ISBN 9781787333888

== Awards and recognition ==
- 2022 – Orwell Prize finalist for Political Fiction – Appliance
- 2020 – T. S. Eliot Prize for Poetry (shortlist) – The Martian's Regress
- 2018 – Costa Poetry Award (won) – Assurances
- 2018 – Forward Poetry Prize for Best Collection (shortlist) – Assurances
- 2016 – T. S. Eliot Prize for Poetry (shortlist) – Interference Pattern
- 2016 – Saltire Society Poetry Award (shortlist) – Interference Pattern
- 2016 – Poetry Book Society Recommendation – Interference Pattern
- 2014 – Saltire Society Poetry Award (shortlist) – At Maldon
- 2012 – Scottish Poetry Book Award (shortlist) – Long Cuts
- 2010 – Scottish Poetry Book Award (shortlist) – Natural Mechanical
- 2009 – Aldeburgh Poetry Prize (won) – Natural Mechanical
- 2009 – Forward Poetry Prize for First Collection (shortlist) – Natural Mechanical
- 2009 – Poetry Book Society Recommendation – Natural Mechanical
