= Dorothy Nimmo =

British poet (1932 – 2001)

- Born: 1932; Manchester, England
- Died: 24 May 2001 (aged 68–69); Yorkshire, England
- Education: Lancaster University
- Occupation: Poet
- Writing career
- Genre: Poetry

Dorothy Nimmo (1932 in Manchester – 24 May 2001) was an English poet, winner of the Cholmondeley Award in 1996.

== Life ==
Educated in York and Cambridge, Nimmo worked as an actress in London before spending the 1960s in Geneva, returning to England in 1970 and living in Peterborough. In 1980, she divorced. In 1989, she gained an MA in creative writing from Lancaster University.

She stayed at the Pendle Hill Quaker Center for Study and Contemplation. She was caretaker of the Friends Meeting House in Gloucester, and the Friends Meeting House in Settle, Yorkshire.

Her work appeared in Stand, Thumbscrew, Areté Magazine, and Oxford Poetry.

Nimmo won awards at the Cardiff, Bridport, South Manchester and Prema competitions. She was guest poet at the Aldeburgh Festival in November 1995, and won the Cholmondeley Award in 1996.

== Works ==
- AnneKate Friedlander, Beloit Poetry Journal, Volume39, Number 3, Spring 1989]
- Dorothy Nimmo. (1987). Homewards. Giant Steps. ISBN 978-0-948727-03-0.
- Dorothy Nimmo. (1993). Kill the Black Parrot. Littlewood Arc. ISBN 978-0-946407-73-6.
- Dorothy Nimmo. (1993). A Testimony to the Grace of God in the Life of James Nayler 1618-1660. Sessions Book Trust. ISBN 978-1-85072-129-1.
- Dorothy Nimmo. (1995). The Underhill Experience. Smith/Doorstop. ISBN 978-1-869961-67-1.
- Dorothy Nimmo. (1998). The Children's Game. Smith/Doorstop. ISBN 978-1-869961-86-2.
- Dorothy Nimmo. (2000). The Wigbox: New & Selected Poems. Smith/Doorstop Books. ISBN 978-1-902382-24-1.
