= Gillian Allnutt =

English poet

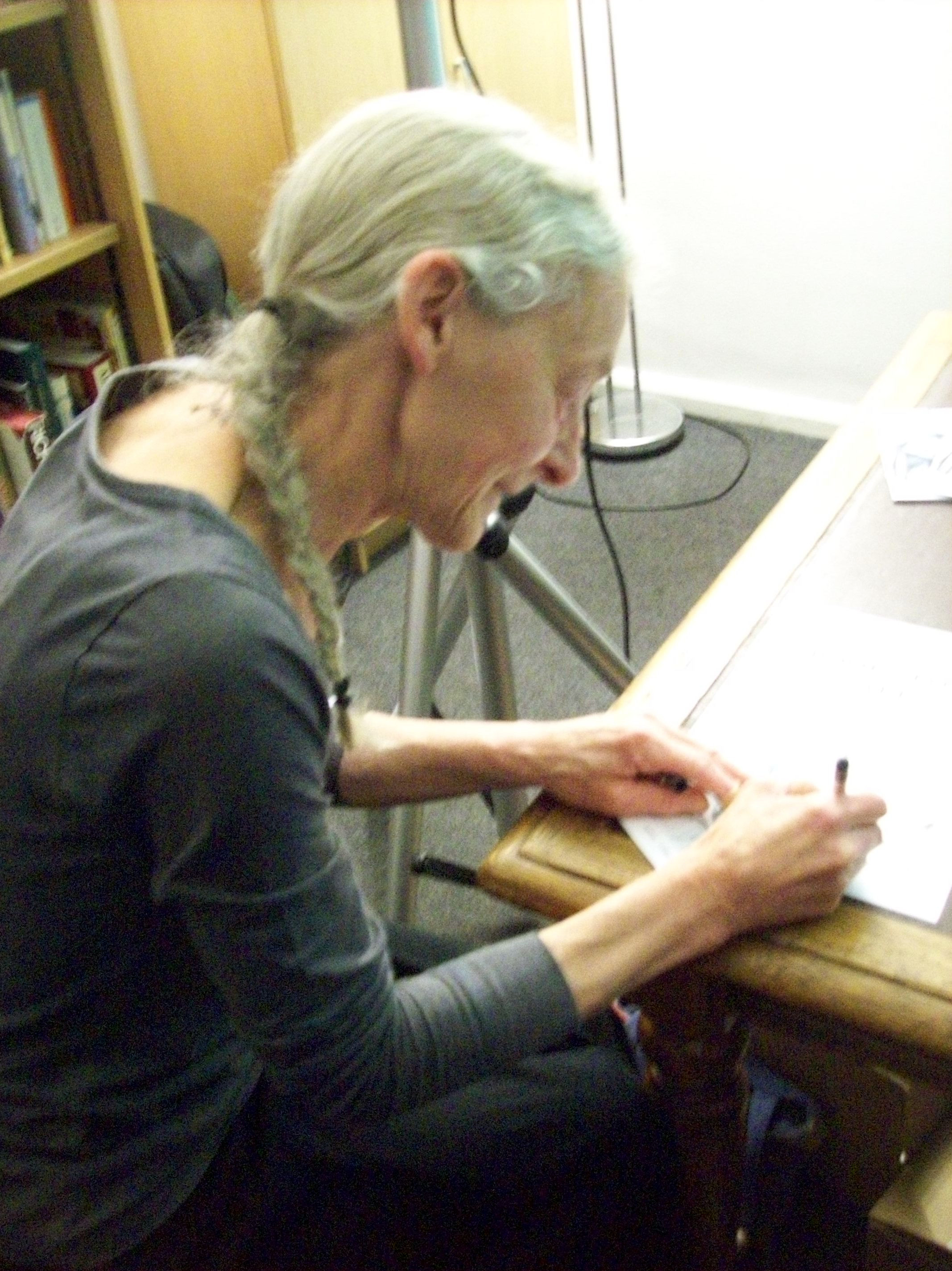
Gillian Allnutt in 2014

Gillian Allnutt FRSL (born 15 January 1949) is an English poet, author of ten poetry collections and recipient of several prizes including the 2016 Queen's Gold Medal for Poetry.

== Life ==
Allnutt was born in London, but was educated at La Sagesse School in Newcastle upon Tyne. She attended the University of Sussex and Newnham College in Cambridge. She returned to the North East in 1988, and now lives in Esh Winning, County Durham.

Allnutt read Philosophy and English at Cambridge, and from 1983 to 1988 she was poetry editor of City Limits magazine. Her collections Nantucket and the Angel and Lintel were both shortlisted for the T. S. Eliot Prize. Poems from these collections are included in her Bloodaxe retrospective How the Bicycle Shone: New & Selected Poems (2007), which draws on six published books plus a new collection, Wolf Light, and was a Poetry Book Society Special Commendation. She has also published Berthing: A Poetry Workbook (NEC/Virago, 1991), and was co-editor of The New British Poetry (Paladin, 1988).

From 2001 to 2003 Allnutt held a Royal Literary Fund Fellowship at Newcastle and Leeds Universities. She won the Northern Rock Foundation Writer's Award in 2005 and received a Cholmondeley Award in 2010. Since 1983 she has taught creative writing in a variety of contexts, mainly in adult education and as a writer in schools.

In 2009-10 Allnutt held a writing residency with The Medical Foundation for the Care of Victims of Torture (now Freedom From Torture) in the North East, working with asylum seekers in Newcastle and Stockton. In 2013-14 she taught creative writing to undergraduates on the Poetry and Poetics course in the English Department of Durham University.

In 2016 Allnutt was named as the recipient of the Queen's Gold Medal for Poetry 2016. The Medal is awarded for excellence in poetry, and was presented to Gillian Allnutt by the Queen in February 2017.

In 2025 Allnutt was shortlisted for T. S. Eliot Prize for the third time for her collection lode, and made a Fellow of the Royal Society of Literature.

A photo of Allnutt outside Durham Cathedral is on display in Room 37a at the National Portrait Gallery.

== Bibliography ==
=== Poetry ===
- Spitting the Pips Out (Sheba, 1981)
- Beginning the Avocado (Virago, 1987)
- Blackthorn (Bloodaxe Books, 1994) ISBN 978-1-85224-270-1
- Nantucket and the Angel (Bloodaxe Books, 1997) ISBN 978-1-85224-382-1
- Lintel (Bloodaxe Books, 2001) ISBN 978-1-85224-547-4
- Sojourner (Bloodaxe Books, 2004) ISBN 978-1-85224-669-3
- How the Bicycle Shone: New & Selected Poems (Bloodaxe Books, 2007) ISBN 978-1-85224-759-1
- indwelling (Bloodaxe Books, 2013) ISBN 978-1-85224-980-9
- wake (Bloodaxe Books, 2018) ISBN 978-1-78037-406-2
- lode (Bloodaxe Books, 2025) ISBN 978-1-78037-745-2

=== Anthologies ===
- The New British Poetry (Paladin, 1988) (co-editor)

=== Workbook ===
- Berthing: A Poetry Workbook (NEC/Virago, 1991)
