= Selima Hill =

British poet (born 1945)

- Born: Seilima Wood; 13 October 1945 (age 80); Hampstead, England
- Citizenship: United Kingdom
- Education: Cambridge University
- Occupations: Academic, poet
- Writing career
- Notable works: Violet (1997); Bunny (2001)
- Notable awards: Cholmondeley Award (1986); Whitbread Book Award (2001); King's Gold Medal for Poetry

Selima Hill (born 13 October 1945) is a British poet. She has published twenty poetry collections since 1984. Her 1997 collection, Violet, was shortlisted for the most important British poetry awards: the Forward Poetry Prize (Best Poetry Collection of the Year), the T. S. Eliot Prize and the Whitbread Poetry Award. She was selected as recipient of the 2022 King's Gold Medal for Poetry.

== Early life and education ==
Selima Hill was born 13 October, 1945 in Hampstead, England to a family of artists. Her parents and her grandparent were painters. She lived in rural England and Wales when she was young. Hill attended boarding school and later won a scholarship to study Moral Sciences at New Hall, Cambridge University. She attended Cambridge from 1965 to 1967.

== Career ==
Hill's first poetry collection, Saying Hello at the Station (Chatto & Windus), was published in 1984. Selima Hill won first prize in the 1988 Arvon Foundation/Observer International Poetry Competition for her long poem, The Accumulation of Small Acts of Kindness, and her 1997 collection, Violet, was shortlisted for the Forward Poetry Prize (Best Poetry Collection of the Year), the T. S. Eliot Prize and the Whitbread Poetry Award. Her poetry collection, Bunny (2001), a series of poems about a young girl growing up in the 1950s, won the Whitbread Poetry Award, was shortlisted for the T.S. Eliot Prize, and was a Poetry Book Society Choice.

Later poetry collections are The Hat (2008); Fruitcake (2009); People Who Like Meatballs (2012), shortlisted for both the Forward Poetry Prize and the Costa Poetry Award; The Sparkling Jewel of Naturism (2014); Jutland (2015), a Poetry Book Society Special Commendation which was shortlisted for the 2015 T.S. Eliot Prize and was earlier shortlisted for the Roehampton Poetry Prize; The Magnitude of My Sublime Existence (2016), shortlisted for the Roehampton Poetry Prize 2017; Splash like Jesus (2017); and I May Be Stupid But I'm Not That Stupid (2019). Her latest collection, Men Who Feed Pigeons, was published by Bloodaxe Books in 2021 and shortlisted for both the Forward and T.S. Eliot Prizes.

Hill was awarded a 1991 Writing Fellowship at the University of East Anglia, was writer-in-residence at the Royal Festival Hall in 1992, and at the Science Museum in London in 1996. She taught at the Poetry School and Poetry Library in London in the late 1990s and early 2000s. Hill was awarded a Royal Literary Fund fellowship at the University of Exeter (2003—2006)."

Hill has also taught creative writing in hospitals and prisons. She has lived in Dorset for the last forty years.

The Hill (Selima) Archive is held at Newcastle University Library Special Collections and Archives.

In January 2023, it was announced that Hill had been approved to be awarded the King's Gold Medal for Poetry for the year 2022, having been selected by a committee chaired by the Poet Laureate Simon Armitage, on the basis of her body of work, in particular Gloria: Selected Poems (Bloodaxe Books, 2008). Armitage stated: "“Selima Hill is an inimitable talent. The mind is fragile and unreliable in her poetry, but is also tenacious and surprising, capable of the most extraordinary responses, always fighting back with language as its survival kit. ...Hill's writing is eminently readable and approachable, even fun at times, the voice of a person and a poet who will not be quieted and will not conform to expectations, especially poetic ones."

== Critique ==
Poet Fiona Sampson says of her work,

"Selima Hill's 1984 collection Saying Hello at the Station introduced arguably the most distinctive truth teller to emerge in British poetry since Sylvia Plath. In the quarter-century since that debut, her voice has deepened and strengthened as its subject matter has widened from bereavement and life in a psychiatric unit to more general difficulties with men, family relationships, and the business of living. The simultaneous publication of Hill's new collection The Hat, and a Selected Poems, Gloria, is the perfect moment to rediscover this inimitably exhilarating poet".

== Awards and honours ==
- 1986: Cholmondeley Award
- 1988: Arvon Foundation/Observer International Poetry Competition, 1st prize
- 2001: Whitbread Poetry Award, Bunny
- University of East Anglia Writing Fellowship
- 2010: Michael Marks Poetry Award, Advice on Wearing Animal Prints
- 2022: King's Gold Medal for Poetry

== Selected works ==
- Saying Hello at the Station. Chatto and Windus. 1984. ISBN 978-0-7011-2788-6.
- My Darling Camel. Chatto and Windus. 1988. ISBN 0701132868.
- The Accumulation of Small Acts of Kindness. Chatto and Windus. 1989. ISBN 978-0-7011-3455-6.
- A Little Book of Meat. Bloodaxe Books. 1993. ISBN 978-1852242435.
- Trembling Hearts in the Bodies of Dogs: New and Selected Poems. Bloodaxe Books. 1994. ISBN 978-1-85224-288-6.
- Aeroplanes of the World. Bloodaxe Books. 1994.
- Violet. Bloodaxe Books. 1997. ISBN 978-1-85224-400-2.
- Jumping Over Trees: Poems from the Poetry Library, London. The Poetry Library and Royal Festival Hall Education, 2000.
- Bunny. Bloodaxe Books. 2001. ISBN 978-1-85224-507-8.
- Lou-Lou. Bloodaxe Books. 2004. ISBN 978-1-85224-671-6.
- Gloria: Selected Poems. Bloodaxe Books. 2008. ISBN 978-1-85224-805-5.
- The Hat. Bloodaxe Books. 2008. ISBN 978-1-85224-806-2.
- Fruitcake. Bloodaxe Books. 2009. ISBN 978-1-85224-848-2.
- People Who Like Meatballs. Bloodaxe Books. 2012. ISBN 978-1-85224-945-8.
- Jutland. Bloodaxe Books. 2015. ISBN 978-1-78037-149-8.
- The Magnitude of My Sublime Existence. Bloodaxe Books. 2016. ISBN 978-1-78037-305-8.
- Splash Like Jesus. Bloodaxe Books. 2016. ISBN 978-1-78037-349-2.
- I May Be Stupid But I'm Not That Stupid. Bloodaxe Books. 2019. ISBN 978-1-78037-191-7.
- Men Who Feed Pigeons. Bloodaxe Books. 2021. ISBN 978-1-78037-586-1.
- Women in Comfortable Shoes. Bloodaxe Books. 2023. ISBN 978-1-78037-667-7.
- Dancing Lessons for the Very Shy. Guillemot Press. 2023. ISBN 978-1-913749-38-5.
- The Lonely Slug. Guillemot Press. 2024. ISBN 978-1-913749-51-4.
- A Man, A Woman & a Hippopotamus. Bloodaxe Books. 2025. ISBN 978-1-78037-752-0.
