= Harold Massingham =

English poet (1932–2011)

- Born: Harold W. Massingham; 25 October 1932; Mexborough, South Yorkshire, England
- Died: 13 March 2011 (aged 78)
- Education: Victoria University of Manchester
- Occupation: Poet
- Writing career
- Pen name: Mass
- Notable awards: Cholmondeley Award (1968)

Harold W. Massingham (25 October 1932 in Mexborough – 13 March 2011) was an English poet.

== Life ==
He was the son of H. W. Massingham (a collier from Mexborough). He attended the same Mexborough Grammar School as the Yorkshire poet and Poet Laureate Ted Hughes but in a class two years below. He taught at the University of Manchester; his students included Steven Waling, and Trevor Griffiths.

Harold Massingham lived in Mexborough through his childhood, and then Manchester from his university days, until moving with his wife Pat to Spain in the 1990s. He published three volumes of poetry in 1965, 1972 and 1992.

His work was published in The New Yorker, and Alhambra Poetry Calendar.

Under the pseudonym ‘Mass’ he set crosswords for national newspapers and magazines for more than 30 years. He also compiled chess puzzles.

== Awards ==
- 1968 Cholmondeley Awards for Poets

== Work ==
=== Poetry broadsheets ===
- Doomsday
- The Magician, Manchester: Phoenix Pamphlet Poets Press, 1969
- Seafarer
- Wanderer
- The Magician's Attic

=== Poetry books ===
- Black Bull Guarding Apples. London: Longmans. 1965.
- Frost Gods, Macmillan, 1972
- Sonatas & Dreams, Littlewood Arc, 1992
- Selected Poems, Calder Valley Poetry, 2021

=== Anthology ===
- John Matthews, ed. (October 1988). "The Finding of Merlin". An Arthurian Reader. Aquarian Press. ISBN 0-85030-778-3.
- "Tree-dream". The Poetry Book Society Anthology 1989-90. Hutchinson. October 1989. ISBN 978-0-09-173992-8.
