= Postcolonial Love Poem =

Natalie Diaz poem collection

Postcolonial Love Poem is a poem collection by Natalie Diaz which is her second collection.

== Awards ==
- Pulitzer Prize for Poetry

=== Finalist or Shortlist in ===
- National Book Award for Poetry
- Los Angeles Times Book Prize for Poetry.
- Forward Prize for Best Collection
- T. S. Eliot Prize
