= Maura Dooley =

British poet and writer (born 1957)

Maura Dooley FRSL
- Born: 18 May 1957 (age 69); Truro, England
- Education: University of York; University of Bristol
- Occupations: Poet and writer
- Employer: Goldsmiths, University of London
- Writing career
- Notable work: Life Under Water (2008)
- Notable awards: Eric Gregory Award; Cholmondeley Award

Maura Dooley (born 18 May 1957) is a British poet and writer. She has published five collections of poetry and edited several anthologies. She is the winner of the Eric Gregory Award in 1987 and the Cholmondeley Award in 2016, and was shortlisted for the Forward Poetry Prize (single poem) in 1997 and again in 2015. Her poetry collections Life Under Water (2008) and Kissing a Bone (1996) were shortlisted for the T. S. Eliot Prize.

== Biography ==
Maura Dooley was born on 18 May 1957 in Truro, Cornwall, England, to Irish parents, and she grew up in Bristol. Her two brothers, Terence and Timothy, are also writers. She obtained a BA (Hons) degree from the University of York in 1978 and attended the University of Bristol from 1980 to 1981.

She was the director of the writing centre at the Arvon Foundation in Yorkshire from 1982 to 1987. From 1987 to 1993, Dooley served as programme director of literature for the Southbank Centre in London. In the 1990s, she helped develop family films for Jim Henson Productions and developed a theatre workshop for Performing Arts Labs. Dooley is currently Professor of Creative Writing at Goldsmiths, University of London.

She was elected a Fellow of the Royal Society of Literature in 2006.

Dooley has been a judge for the T. S. Eliot Prize, the National Poetry Competition, the Forward Prizes for Poetry and the London Arts New London Writers Awards.

In June 2026, Dooley's poem "A Bunch of Consolation", from her 2023 collection Five Fifty-Five, featured in the Summer set of Poems on the Underground.

== Works ==
=== Poetry collections ===
- Explaining Magnetism (1991)
- Kissing a Bone (1996)
- Sound Barrier (2002)
- Life Under Water (2008)
- The Silvering (2016)
- Five Fifty-Five (2023)

=== Edited publications ===
- Dooley, Maura, ed. (2003). Honey Gatherers: A Book of Love Poems. Bloodaxe Books. ISBN 9781852243593. Archived from the original on 12 May 2022.
- Dooley, Maura, ed. (1997). Making for Planet Alice: New Women Poets. Seren Books. ISBN 9781854111920.
- Dooley, Maura; Curtis, Tony, eds. (2007). How Novelists Work. Bloodaxe Books. ISBN 9781852243982.

=== Translations ===
- Ghahreman, Azita (2018). Negative of a Group Photograph (in Persian). Translated by Maura Dooley; Elhum Shakerifar. Poetry Translation Centre / Bloodaxe Books. ISBN 9781780374369.

== Awards ==
- 1987: Eric Gregory Award
- 2016: Cholmondeley Award
