= Bee Journal =

2012 poetry collection by Sean Borodale

- First edition
- Author: Sean Borodale
- Language: English
- Genre: Poetry, beekeeping
- Published: 2012 (Jonathan Cape)
- Publication place: England
- Media type: Print (paperback)
- Pages: 90
- ISBN: 9780224097215
- OCLC: 941596131

Bee Journal is a 2012 poetry collection by Sean Borodale. It is written in the form of a journal and follows one colony for around one year, from the initial formation of the hive to the capture of a swarm.

== Reception ==
A review in The Daily Telegraph of Bee Journal described it as "the most beautiful expression of what it is like to live with bees that you could hope to find.". Granta compared it to The Life of the Bee by Maurice Maeterlinck. It has also been reviewed by Varsity.

Bee Journal was shortlisted for the 2012 T. S. Eliot Prize, and the 2012 Costa Poetry Award.
