= King's Gold Medal for Poetry =

- Type: Gold Medal
- Awarded for: Meritorious achievement in poetry
- Presented by: United Kingdom
- Established: 1933
- Total recipients: 53

The King's Gold Medal for Poetry (known as Queen's Gold Medal for Poetry when the monarch is female) is awarded for a book of verse published by someone in any of the Commonwealth realms. Originally the award was open only to British subjects living in the United Kingdom, but in 1985 the scope was extended to include people from the rest of the Commonwealth realms. Recommendations to the King for the award of the Medal are made by a committee of eminent scholars and authors chaired by the Poet Laureate. In recent times, the award has been announced on (the traditional date of) the birthday of William Shakespeare, 23 April. However, Don Paterson was awarded the medal alongside the 2010 New Year Honours.

The Gold Medal for Poetry was instituted by King George V in 1933 at the suggestion of the British royal court's poet laureate, John Masefield.

The obverse of the medal bears the effigy of the King. The idea of the reverse, which was designed by Edmund Dulac, is: "Truth emerging from her well and holding in her right hand the divine flame of inspiration - Beauty is truth and Truth Beauty". The latter part of this description recalls "Beauty is Truth, Truth Beauty", from John Keats's poem "Ode on a Grecian Urn".

== Recipients ==
- 2025: Michael Laskey
- 2024: George Szirtes
- 2023: Mimi Khalvati
- 2022: Selima Hill
- 2021: Grace Nichols
- 2020: David Constantine
- 2019: Lorna Goodison
- 2018: Simon Armitage
- 2017: Paul Muldoon
- 2016: Gillian Allnutt
- 2015: Liz Lochhead
- 2014: Imtiaz Dharker
- 2013: Douglas Dunn
- 2012: John Agard
- 2011: Jo Shapcott
- 2010: Gillian Clarke
- 2009: Don Paterson
- 2007: James Fenton
- 2006: Fleur Adcock
- 2004: Hugo Williams
- 2003: U. A. Fanthorpe
- 2002: Peter Porter
- 2001: Michael Longley
- 2000: Edwin Morgan
- 1998: Les Murray
- 1996: Peter Redgrove
- 1992: Kathleen Raine
- 1991: Judith Wright
- 1990: Sorley MacLean
- 1989: Allen Curnow
- 1988: Derek Walcott
- 1986: Norman MacCaig
- 1981: D. J. Enright
- 1977: Norman Nicholson
- 1974: Ted Hughes
- 1973: John Heath-Stubbs
- 1971: Stephen Spender
- 1970: Roy Fuller
- 1969: Stevie Smith
- 1968: Robert Graves
- 1967: Charles Causley
- 1965: Philip Larkin
- 1964: R. S. Thomas
- 1963: William Plomer
- 1962: Christopher Fry
- 1960: John Betjeman
- 1959: Frances Cornford
- 1957: Siegfried Sassoon
- 1956: Edmund Blunden
- 1955: Ruth Pitter
- 1954: Ralph Hodgson
- 1953: Arthur Waley
- 1952: Andrew Young
- 1940: Michael Thwaites
- 1937: W. H. Auden
- 1934: Laurence Whistler

== See also ==
- English poetry
- List of Australian literary awards
- List of British literary awards
- List of Canadian awards
- List of New Zealand literary awards
- List of poetry awards
- List of years in literature
- List of years in poetry
