= James Conor Patterson =

Irish poet

James Conor Patterson is an Irish poet, essayist and editor.

== Biography ==
Patterson grew up in Newry in the North of Ireland.

Patterson received an Eric Gregory Award from the Society of Authors in 2019 for best collected poetry by a writer under 30 years old. In 2021, with the 100th anniversary of Irish partition approaching, Patterson edited an anthology on contemporary writing about the border region, The New Frontier: Reflections from the Irish Border (2021).

His debut poetry collection, bandit country, was published by Picador in 2022, and was nominated for the T.S. Eliot Prize, the John Pollard International Poetry Prize and the Michael Murphy Memorial Prize.

In 2025, he received a Poet of Promise bursary from the Ireland Chair of Poetry.

== Works ==
- Patterson, James C. 2021. New Frontier: Reflections from the Irish Border. Dublin: New Island Books. ISBN 978-1-84840-816-6
- Patterson, James C. 2022. bandit country. London: Picador. ISBN 978-1-5290-9277-6
