= Neil Rollinson =

British poet (born 1960)

Neil Rollinson (born 1960 West Yorkshire) is a British poet.

== Life ==
He has published four collections of poetry, all Poetry Book Society Recommendations (Jonathan Cape UK). His last collection Talking Dead was shortlisted for the Costa Poetry Award. He has published several pamphlets, the last of which, also titled Talking Dead was shortlisted for the Michael Marks award. He was a writer in residence at Wordsworth’s Dove Cottage for two years and has since been teaching creative writing at Bath Spa University.

He was a 2007 writer-in-residence at Manchester's Centre For New Writing.

He tutors occasionally at the Arvon Centre. and works regularly with mentees on poetry projects.

== Awards ==
- 1997 First Prize, UK National Poetry Competition
- Royal Literary Fund Fellow
- 2005 Cholmondeley Award
- 2015 Shortlist: Costa Poetry Prize.

== Works ==
- "Hubris". The Guardian. London. 29 September 2007.
- "Constellations; French". The Poem. Archived from the original on 31 December 2008.
- Padel, Ruth (28 February 1999). "The Sunday Poem: No 13 GIANT PUFFBALLS". The Independence. London.
- "Constellations"; "Entropy", Nox Oculis
- "The Ecstasy of St Saviours Avenue"
- A Spillage of Mercury. J. Cape. 1996. ISBN 978-0-224-04008-2.
- Gridlines. Two Rivers Press. 2000. ISBN 978-1-901677-29-4.
- Spanish Fly. Cape Poetry. 2001. ISBN 978-0-224-06207-7.
- Menage a Trois. Illustrator Louise Clarke. 2002. ISBN 978-0-9542501-0-2. chapbook
- Demolition. Jonathan Cape. 2007. ISBN 978-0-224-08171-9.
- Talking Dead. Jonathan Cape. 2015. ISBN 978-0-22409-729-1.
