= Ciaran Carson =

Northern Ireland-born poet and novelist (1948–2019)

- Born: 9 October 1948 Belfast, Northern Ireland
- Died: 6 October 2019 (aged 70) Belfast, Northern Ireland
- Education: St. Mary's Christian Brothers' Grammar School, Belfast; Queen's University, Belfast
- Notable awards: Eric Gregory Award (1978); Alice Hunt Bartlett Prize (1987); T. S. Eliot Prize (1993); Cholmondeley Award (2003); Forward Poetry Prize (2003)

Ciaran Gerard Carson (Irish: Ciarán Gearóid Mac Carráin; 9 October 1948 – 6 October 2019) was a Northern Ireland-born poet and novelist.

== Early life and education ==
Ciaran Carson was born on 9 October 1948 in Belfast into an Irish-speaking family. His father, William, was a postman and his mother, Mary, worked in the linen mills. He spent his early years in the lower Falls Road where he attended Slate Street School and then St Gall's Primary School, both of which subsequently closed. He then attended St Mary's Christian Brothers' Grammar School before proceeding to Queen's University Belfast (QUB) to read for a degree in English. He died in Belfast on 6 October 2019.

== Career ==
After graduation, he worked for over twenty years as the Traditional Arts Officer of the Arts Council of Northern Ireland.

In 1998 he was appointed a Professor of English at QUB where he established and was the Director of the Seamus Heaney Centre.

He retired in 2016 but remained attached to the organisation on a part-time basis.

== Work ==
His collections of poetry include The Irish for No (1987), winner of the Alice Hunt Bartlett Prize; Belfast Confetti (1990), which won the Irish Times Irish Literature Prize for Poetry; and First Language: Poems (1993), winner of the T. S. Eliot Prize. His prose includes The Star Factory (1997) and Fishing for Amber (1999). His novel Shamrock Tea (2001), explores themes present in Jan van Eyck's painting The Arnolfini Marriage. His translation of Dante's Inferno was published in November 2002. Breaking News, (2003), won the Forward Poetry Prize (Best Poetry Collection of the Year) and a Cholmondeley Award. His translation of Brian Merriman's The Midnight Court came out in 2006. For All We Know was published in 2008, and his Collected Poems were published in Ireland in 2008, and in North America in 2009.

He was also an accomplished musician, and the author of Last Night's Fun: About Time, Food and Music (1996), a study of Irish traditional music. He wrote a bi-monthly column on traditional Irish music for The Journal of Music. In 2007 his translation of the early Irish epic Táin Bó Cúailnge, called The Táin, was published by Penguin Classics.

Two months before he died he published Claude Monet, "The Artist’s Garden at Vétheuil", 1880 in The New Yorker. Its last lines were:

It’s beautiful weather, the 30th of March, and tomorrow the clocks go forward.
How strange it is to be lying here listening to whatever it is going on.
The days are getting longer now, however many of them I have left.
And the pencil I am writing this with, old as it is, will easily outlast their end.

== Critical perspective ==
Carson managed an unusual marriage in his work between the Irish vernacular story-telling tradition and the witty elusive mock-pedantic scholarship of Paul Muldoon (Muldoon also combines both modes). In a trivial sense, what differentiates them is line length. As Carol Rumens pointed out 'Before the 1987 publication of The Irish for No, Carson was a quiet, solid worker in the groves of Heaney. But at that point, he rebelled into language, set free by a rangy "long line" that was attributed variously to the influence of C. K. Williams, Louis MacNeice and traditional music'.

Carson's first book was The New Estate (1976). In the ten years before The Irish for No (1987) he perfected a new style which effected a unique fusion of traditional storytelling with postmodernist devices. The first poem in The Irish for No, the tour-de-force 'Dresden' parades his new technique. Free-ranging allusion is the key. The poem begins in shabby bucolic:

'And as you entered in, a bell would tinkle in the empty shop, a musk
Of soap and turf and sweets would hit you from the gloom.'

It takes five pages to get to Dresden, the protagonist having joined the RAF as an escape from rural and then urban poverty. In Carson everything is rooted in the everyday, so the destruction of Dresden evokes memories of a particular Dresden shepherdess he had on the mantelpiece as a child and the destruction is described in terms of 'an avalanche of porcelain, sluicing and cascading'.

Like Muldoon's, Carson's work was intensely allusive. In much of his poetry, he had a project of sociological scope: to evoke Belfast in encyclopaedic detail. Part Two of The Irish for No was called 'Belfast Confetti' and this idea expanded to become his next book. The Belfast of the Troubles is mapped with obsessive precision and the language of the Troubles is as powerful a presence as the Troubles themselves. The poem "Belfast Confetti" signals this:

'Suddenly as the riot squad moved in, it was raining exclamation marks,
Nuts, bolts, nails, car-keys. A fount of broken type...'

In First Language (1993), which won the T. S. Eliot Prize, language has become the subject. There are translations of Ovid, Rimbaud and Baudelaire. Carson was deeply influenced by Louis MacNeice and he included a poem called 'Bagpipe Music'. What it owes to the original is its rhythmic verve. With his love of dense long lines, it is not surprising he was drawn to classical poetry and Baudelaire. In fact, the rhythm of 'Bagpipe Music' seems to be that of an Irish jig, on which subject he was an expert (his book about Irish music Last Night's Fun (1996) is regarded as a classic). To be precise, the rhythm is that of a "single jig" or "slide."):

'blah dithery dump a doodle scattery idle fortunoodle.'

Carson then entered a prolific phase in which the concern for language liberated him into a new creativity. Opera Etcetera (1996) had a set of poems on letters of the alphabet and another series on Latin tags such as 'Solvitur Ambulando' and 'Quod Erat Demonstrandum' and another series of translations from the Romanian poet Ștefan Augustin Doinaș. Translation became a key concern, The Alexandrine Plan (1998) featured sonnets by Baudelaire, Rimbaud and Mallarmé rendered into Alexandrines. Carson's penchant for the long line found a perfect focus in the 12-syllable alexandrine line. He also published The Twelfth of Never (1999), sonnets on fanciful themes:

'This is the land of the green rose and the lion lily, /
Ruled by Zeno's eternal tortoises and hares, /
where everything is metaphor and simile'.

The Ballad of HMS Belfast (1999) collected his Belfast poems.

== Awards ==
- 1978: Eric Gregory Award
- 1987: Alice Hunt Bartlett Prize for The Irish for No
- 1990: Irish Times Irish Literature Prize for Poetry for Belfast Confetti
- 1993: T. S. Eliot Prize for First Language: Poems
- 1997: Yorkshire Post Book Award (Book of the Year) for The Star Factory
- 2003: Cholmondeley Award for Breaking News
- 2003: Forward Poetry Prize (Best Poetry Collection of the Year) for Breaking News

== Death and legacy ==
Carson died of lung cancer on 6 October 2019 at the age of 70.

In 2020, the Seamus Heaney Centre established two annual fellowships in memory of its first director, Ciaran Carson, and inspired by his writing about the city of Belfast in prose as well as poetry.

== Bibliography ==
=== Poetry ===
- 1976: The New Estate, Blackstaff Press, Wake Forest University Press
- 1987: The Irish for No, Gallery Press, Wake Forest University Press
- 1988: The New Estate and Other Poems, Gallery Press
- 1989: Belfast Confetti, Gallery Press, Wake Forest University Press
- 1993: First Language: Poems, Gallery Books, Wake Forest University Press
- 1996: Opera Et Cetera, Bloodaxe, Wake Forest University Press
- 1998: The Alexandrine Plan (adaptations of sonnets by Baudelaire, Mallarmé, and Rimbaud), Gallery Press, Wake Forest University Press
- 1999: The Ballad of HMS Belfast: A Compendium of Belfast Poems, Picador
- 2001: The Twelfth of Never, Picador, Wake Forest University Press
- 2003: Breaking News, Gallery Press, Wake Forest University Press, awarded the 2003 Forward Prize for Best Poetry Collection
- 2008: For All We Know, Gallery Press; Wake Forest University Press, 2008
- 2008: Collected Poems, Gallery Press; Wake Forest University Press, 2009
- 2009: On the Night Watch, Gallery Press; Wake Forest University Press, 2010
- 2010: Until Before After, Gallery Press, Wake Forest University Press
- 2012: In the Light Of, Gallery Press; Wake Forest University Press, 2013
- 2019: Still Life, Gallery Press; Wake Forest University Press, 2020

=== Prose ===
- 1978: The Lost Explorer, Ulsterman Publications
- 1986: Irish Traditional Music, Appletree Press
- 1995: Belfast Frescoes, (with John Kindness) Ulster Museum
- 1995: Letters from the Alphabet, Gallery Press
- 1996: Last Night's Fun: About Time, Food and Music, a book about traditional music; Cape; North Point Press (New York), 1997 ISBN 0-86547-511-3
- 1997: The Star Factory, a memoir of Belfast; Granta
- 1999: Fishing for Amber, Granta
- 2001: Shamrock Tea, a novel which was longlisted for the Booker Prize; Granta
- 2009: The Pen Friend, a web of memory, published by Blackstaff Press
- 2012: Exchange Place, a novel, published by Blackstaff Press

=== Translations ===
- 2002: The Inferno of Dante Alighieri (translator), Granta, awarded the Oxford-Weidenfeld Translation Prize
- 2005: The Midnight Court, (translation of Brian Merriman's Cúirt an Mhéan Oíche, Gallery Press; Wake Forest University Press, 2006
- 2007: The Táin, Penguin Classics
- 2012: From Elsewhere, (translations of Jean Follain's poetry, paired with original poem/meditations on the same) Gallery Press
