= Stephen Knight (poet) =

- Born: 1960 (age 65–66); Swansea, Wales
- Education: Oxford University
- Occupations: Poet, novelist

Stephen Knight (born 1960) is a British (Welsh) poet, novelist, theatre director and tutor in creative writing.

== Biography ==
Knight was born in Britain in 1960, at Swansea. He studied English at Oxford University (Jesus College) and theatre directing at the Bristol Old Vic Theatre School.

He has worked as a theatre director in London, and as a tutor in creative writing in the University of Glamorgan and at Goldsmiths' College in London University.

His books of poems include Flowering Limbs (1993), Dream City Cinema (1996), Sardines (2004) and The Prince of Wails (2012). His novel, Mr Schnitzel, was published in 2000.

He received an Eric Gregory Award in 1987 and won the National Poetry Competition in 1992. He won the 2003 TLS/ Blackwells Poetry Competition for "The Long Way Home". His writing deals with disappointment and decay, albeit with a lightness of touch.
