= Fiona Sampson =

British poet and writer (born 1963)

Fiona Sampson MBE|FRSL
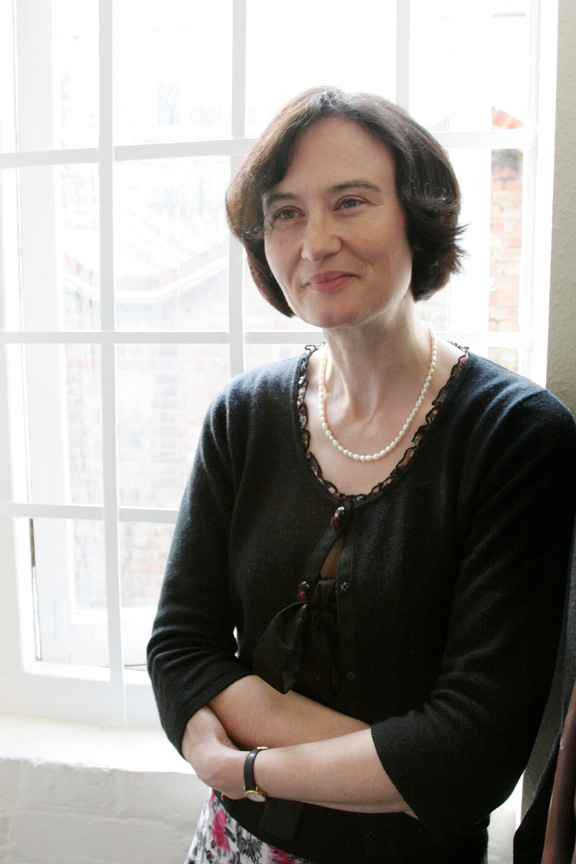
- Born: Fiona Ruth Sampson; 1963 (age 62–63); London, United Kingdom
- Education: Royal Academy of Music; University of Oxford; University of Nijmegen
- Occupations: Poet and writer
- Employer: Harris Manchester College, Oxford
- Writing career
- Period: Contemporary
- Notable awards: Newdigate Prize; Cholmondeley Award

Fiona Ruth Sampson MBE FRSL (born 1963) is a British poet, literary biographer, writer on ecology, editor, translator and scholar. She was appointed an MBE for services to literature in 2017.

== Early life ==
Sampson was born in London, England, and was raised in the West Country. She was adopted as a baby.

== Education ==
Sampson was educated at the Royal Academy of Music and then studied at Oxford University, where she won the Newdigate Prize. She gained a PhD in the philosophy of language from Radboud University Nijmegen in the Netherlands.

== Career ==
Sampson is currently Senior Research Fellow at Harris Manchester College, University of Oxford, and Emeritus Professor of the University of Roehampton.

=== Poetry ===
Sampson has been publishing poetry since 1996 and some of her earlier work is held at The Poetry Archive. Her work has been translated into several languages and her own translations include the work of Jaan Kaplinski and Amir Or. Her themes include ontology, metaphysics and ecology. Her first full collection, Folding the Real, was published in 2001 and was followed by The Distance Between Us (2005), a novel in verse. Her poem "Trumpeldor Beach" was shortlisted for the 2006 Forward Prize. Her later poetry collections include Common Prayer (2007; shortlisted for the T. S. Eliot Prize), Rough Music (2010; shortlisted for both the T. S. Eliot Prize and the Forward Poetry Prize), and Coleshill (2013). Her eighth collection, Come Down (2019) won the poetry section of the Wales Book of the Year.

From 2005 to 2012, Sampson was the editor of Poetry Review, the oldest and most widely read poetry journal in the UK. She was the first woman editor of the journal since Muriel Spark (1947–49). During this time, Sampson published a critical anthology A Century of Poetry Review (Carcanet, 2009), a writing manual Poetry Writing: The Expert Guide (2009), a volume of lectures, Music Lessons, and Beyond the Lyric: A Map of Contemporary British Poetry (Penguin Random House, 2012), a study of the poetry mainstream in the late 20th century.

In 2013, Sampson became Professor of Poetry at the University of Roehampton and director of the Roehampton Poetry Centre. She created the Roehampton Prize for Poetry and chaired the judges in 2015 and 2017. Here she founded Poem, a quarterly international review. Nineteen issues were published between 2013 and 2018. The centre, along with Roehampton's Creative Writing programme, was closed in 2022.

=== Literary criticism and biography ===
Sampson is a Romanticist. Her Faber Poet to Poet edition of Percy Bysshe Shelley was published in 2012. Starlight Wood: Walking Back to the Romantic Countryside, a collection of "Romantic" walks, was published by Corsair in 2022. In Search of Mary Shelley: The Girl Who Wrote Frankenstein. was a finalist for the Biographers' Club Slightly Foxed prize. This was followed by Two-Way Mirror: The Life of Elizabeth Barrett Browning (2021), which was longlisted for the 2021 Biographers International Organisation Plutarch Prize.

=== Other ===
Sampson has been a judge for the Independent Foreign Fiction Prize, the Irish Times IMPAC Awards (now International Dublin Literary Award), the 2011 Forward Poetry Prizes, the 2012 Griffin Poetry Prize, the 2015 T. S. Eliot Prize, and the 2016 Ondaatje Prize. From 2013 to 2016, she was a judge for the Society of Authors' Cholmondeley Awards. She is a trustee of the Royal Literary Fund.

Sampson is a former musician and has worked with composers, including commissions with Sally Beamish, Stephen Goss and Philip Grange. In 2016, she published a study of musical forms and poetry, Lyric Cousins: Music l Form in Poetry (Edinburgh University Press, 2016).

Sampson has published scholarly works and works for general readers on the subject of writing and health care. (below).

Sampson writes for newspapers including The Guardian, Independent, The TLS, The Times, The New York Times, and The Telegraph, as well as for such magazines as The Spectator, New Statesman, Aeon, BBC History and Tablet.

== Awards and honours ==
Sampson has received the Newdigate Prize from the University of Oxford, and a Cholmondeley Award. Sampson is a Fellow of the Royal Society of Literature, where she has served on the Council, and of the English Association and the Wordsworth Trust. She received an MBE for services to literature in 2017.

== Selected bibliography ==
- Becoming George: The Invention of George Sand, W. W. Norton & Company, 2026 ISBN 978-1324074915
- Starlight Wood: Walking back to the Romantic Countryside, Corsair: 2022, ISBN 9781472156013
- Two-Way Mirror: The Life of Elizabeth Barrett Browning, W.W. Norton; Profile Books: 2021, ISBN 9781782835288
- Come Down, Corsair: 2020, ISBN 9781472155153
- In Search of Mary Shelley: The Girl Who Wrote Frankenstein, Profile Books: 2018, ISBN 9781643132426
- Limestone Country, Little Toller: 2017, ISBN 9781908213518
- Lyric Cousins: Poetry & Musical Form, Edinburgh University Press: 2016, ISBN 9781474402927
- The Catch, Penguin Random House: 2016, ISBN 9781448138678, 1448138671
- Coleshill, Penguin Random House: 2013, ISBN 9781448138678
- Night Fugue: Selected Poems, Sheep Meadow Press (US): 2013
- Beyond the Lyric: A Map of Contemporary British Poetry, Penguin Random House: 2012, ISBN 9781448138661, 1448138663
- Percy Bysshe Shelley, 1st edition: The Romantics Series: Faber: 2011, ISBN 9780571279883
- Music Lessons: The Newcastle Poetry Lectures, Bloodaxe: 2011, ISBN 9781852249090
- Rough Music, Carcanet: 2010, ISBN 9781847770455
- A Century of Poetry Review (edited and introduced), Carcanet: 2009, ISBN 9781847770165
- Common Prayer, Carcanet: 2007, ISBN 9781857549423
- On Listening: Selected Essays, Salt: 2007, ISBN 9781844713271
- The Distance Between Us, Seren: 2005, ISBN 9781854113979
- Folding the Real, Seren: 2001, ISBN 9781854112972
- Writing: Self and Reflexivity with Celia Hunt, Palgrave Macmillan: 2005, ISBN 9781403918772
- Creative Writing in Health and Social Care (editor), Jessica Kingsley: 2004, ISBN 9781846420597
- The Self on the Page (editor with Celia Hunt), Jessica Kingsley: 1998, ISBN 9781853024702

== Lyrics for Music ==
- Bee Sama' with Luminita Spinu: King's College London Festival: 2015
- Three sonnets with Harrison Birtwistle: Nash Ensemble: Wigmore Hall: fc
- Tree Carols with Sally Beamish: Coull Quartet: City of London Festival: 2014, Edition Peters: 2015
- Rough Music with Steven Goss: Guildford International Festival: 2009, Boosey and Hawkes: 2010
