= Bhanu Kapil =

British-Indian writer

Bhanu Khapil
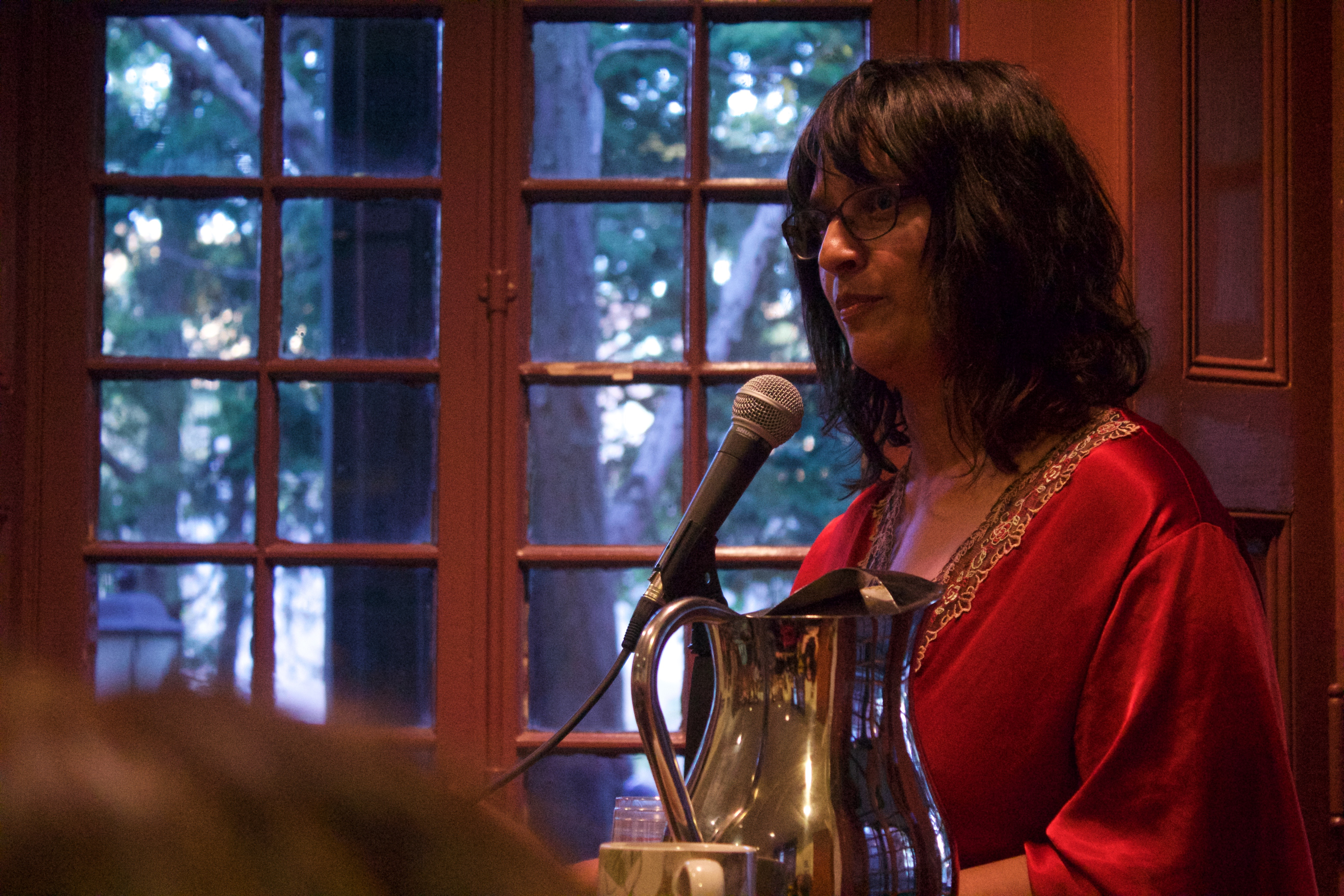
- Khapil speaking at an event at Kelly Writers House, University of Pennsylvania
- Born: 1968 (age 57–58)
- Occupation: Writer
- Awards: T. S. Eliot Prize (2020)

Bhanu Kapil (born 1968) is a British-born poet and author of Indian descent. She is best known for her books The Vertical Interrogation of Strangers (2001), Incubation: A Space for Monsters (2006), and Ban en Banlieue (2015).

In 2020, Kapil won one of eight Windham-Campbell Literature Prizes.

== Personal life and education ==
Kapil was born in 1968 outside of London to Indian parents. In 1990, she moved to the United States, then returned to England in 2019. She presently spends her time in both the United Kingdom and the United States.

Kapil received a Bachelor of Arts degree from Loughborough University and a Master of Arts degree in English Literature from the State University of New York Brockport.

== Career ==
Kapil's first book, The Vertical Interrogation of Strangers, was written in the late 1990s. She has cited Salman Rushdie's 1980 Booker Prize win as a formative experience for her, saying "Perhaps then, for the first time, I understood that someone like me: could. Could look like me and write." In early 2015, The Believer held a round-table discussion of her work over the course of three days.

2009's Humanimal: A Project for Future Children took its inspiration from the nonfiction account of Amala and Kamala, two girls found "living with wolves in colonial Bengal." Douglas A. Martin has described Incubation: A Space For Monsters as "a feminist, post-colonial On the Road." Kapil also contributed the introduction to Amina Cain's short story collection I Go To Some Hollow. Her public readings have elements of performance art. Her poetry appeared in a collection edited by Brian Droitcour that was produced as part of the New Museum's 2015 Triennial.

Aside from writing, Kapil has taught at Naropa University, as well as in Goddard College’s Master of Fine Arts program. She has also contributed and co-taught in the Master's in Leadership for Sustainability program at the University of Vermont.

In 2019, Kapil received a year-long fellowship at the University of Cambridge; after the fellowship, she remained as an artist by-fellow at Churchill College. In 2022, she was elected as a Fellow of the Royal Society of Literature.

== Awards and honours ==
Incubation: A Space for Monsters was a Small Press Distribution best-seller. Ban en Banlieue was named one of Time Out New York's most anticipated books of early 2015.

In 2019, Kapil received the Judith E. Wilson Poetry Fellowship from the University of Cambridge.

In March 2020 Kapil was awarded one of eight Windham-Campbell Literature Prizes. In January 2021, she was awarded the 2020 T. S Eliot Poetry Prize for How to Wash a Heart. She has also received the Cholmondeley Award from the Society of Authors.

== Publications ==
=== Books ===
- The Vertical Interrogation of Strangers, Kelsey Street Press, 2001, ISBN 9780932716569
- Incubation: A Space for Monsters, Leon Works, 2006, ISBN 9780976582021
- Humanimal: A Project for Future Children, Kelsey Street Press, 2009, ISBN 9780932716705
- Schizophrene, Nightboat Books, 2011, ISBN 9780984459865
- Ban en Banlieue, Nightboat Books, 2015, ISBN 9781937658243
- entre-Ban, Vallum, 2017, ISBN 9780995324824
- How to Wash a Heart, Liverpool University Press, 2020, ISBN 9781789621686

=== Chapbooks ===
- Autobiography of a Cyborg, Leroy, 2000.
- Water Damage: A Map of Three Black Days, Corollary Press, 2008.
- Treinte Ban: A psychiatric handbook to accompany a work undone, New Herring Press, 2014.
