= Fiona Benson (poet) =

English poet (born 1978)

Fiona Benson FRSL
- Benson in 2022
- Born: 1978 (age 47–48); Wroughton, Wiltshire, England
- Education: University of St Andrews
- Occupation: Poet
- Spouse: James Meredith
- Children: 2
- Writing career
- Notable work: Bright Travellers
- Notable awards: Forward Prize (2019)

Fiona Benson (born 1978) is an English poet. Her collections have been shortlisted for the T. S. Eliot Prize in 2014, 2019, and 2022. Vertigo and Ghost (2019) won the Forward Prize for Poetry for Best Collection.

== Biography ==
Benson was born in Wroughton, England. She received her Master of Letters and PhD in English from University of St Andrews in Scotland, where she wrote her dissertation on the Ophelia figure in early modern drama. She lives in Thorverton, Devon with her husband James Meredith and their daughters Isla and Rose.

Benson was a recipient of an Eric Gregory Award in 2006. The award is given by the Society of Authors to British poets under 30. Her work was included in Faber New Poets (2009) and her debut collection, Bright Travellers, was published in 2014 by Cape Poetry.

Benson was shortlisted for the T. S. Eliot Prize for her poetry collections Bright Travellers (2014), Vertigo and Ghost (2019), and Ephemeron (2022). The poem "Androgeus" was shortlisted for the 2021 Forward Prize for Best Single Poem. It comes from a long mythic sequence retelling the minotaur myth, which tries to reinstate Pasiphaë, the minotaur’s mother, at the centre of the story. This sequence is included in Ephemeron.

In 2025, Benson published her fourth collection, Midden Witch. The volume deals with witchcraft, herbalism, folk tales, and motherhood, taking particular inspiration from the County Durham witch trials, the influence of which leads to the inclusion of various Durham dialect words in the poems.

== Critical assessment ==
Ben Wilkinson, in a review of Bright Travellers for The Guardian, describes Benson as "a poet whose dark imagination mixes solemnity with lyricism, treating the poem as a kind of secular prayer." Themes in Benson's work include "violence and loss, shown most vividly in her accounts of motherhood," which "are paired seamlessly with moments of great tenderness"

== Awards and recognition ==
Benson was elected a Fellow of the Royal Society of Literature (FRSL) in 2025.

Year	Title	Award	Category	Result	Ref.
2006	—	Eric Gregory Award	—	Won	
2006	—	Faber New Poets Award	—	Won	
2014	Bright Travellers	T. S. Eliot Prize	—	Shortlisted	
2015	Bright Travellers	Geoffrey Faber Memorial Prize	—	Won	
2015	Bright Travellers	Seamus Heaney First Collection Poetry Prize	—	Won	
2019	Vertigo and Ghost	Forward Prizes for Poetry	Collection	Won	
2019	Vertigo and Ghost	T. S. Eliot Prize	—	Shortlisted	
2020	Vertigo and Ghost	The Writers' Prize	—	Shortlisted	
2021	"Androgeus"	Forward Prizes for Poetry	Single Poem	Shortlisted	
2022	Ephemeron	T. S. Eliot Prize	—	Shortlisted	
2023	Ephemeron	The Writers' Prize	Poetry	Shortlisted	

== Work ==
- Bright Travellers, Cape Poetry, (2014)
- Vertigo and Ghost, Cape Poetry, (2019)
- Ariadne, Broken Sleep Books, (2021)
- Ephemeron, Jonathan Cape, (2022)
- Midden Witch, Cape Poetry (2025)
