= Deryn Rees-Jones =

Anglo-Welsh poet (born 1968)

Deryn Rees-Jones (born 1968) is an Anglo-Welsh poet, who lives and works in Liverpool. Although Rees-Jones has spent much of her life in Liverpool, she spent much of her childhood in the family home of Eglwys-bach in North Wales. She considers herself a Welsh writer.

Rees-Jones did doctoral research on women poets at Birkbeck College, and is now a professor of Poetry at Liverpool University. She won an Eric Gregory Award in 1993, and an Arts Council of England Writer's Award in 1996.

== Works ==
She has published three poetry books with Seren, The Memory Tray (1994), which was shortlisted for the Forward Prize for Best First Collection; Signs Round a Dead Body (1998), a Poetry Book Society Special Commendation; and Quiver: A Murder Mystery (2004). A pamphlet, Falls and Finds, appeared from Shoestring in 2008. She has also co-edited a book of essays, Contemporary Women’s Poetry: Reading/Writing/Practice (2001), with Alison Mark, and published a monograph, Carol Ann Duffy (2001) in Northcote House's Writers & Their Work series. Her critical study Consorting with Angels: Essays on Modern Women Poets was published by Bloodaxe in 2005 at the same time as its companion anthology Modern Women Poets. In 2012 and 2019, Rees-Jones was shortlisted for the prestigious T. S. Eliot Prize for her 'Burying the Wren' and 'Erato'.

She is also the editor of Pavilion poetry press.

== Awards and honors ==
- 1993 Eric Gregory Award
- 2012 T. S. Eliot Prize, shortlist, Burying the Wren
- 2019 T. S. Eliot Prize, shortlist, Erato
- 2024 Fellow of the Royal Society of Literature
