= Mimi Khalvati =

Iranian-born British poet (born 1944)

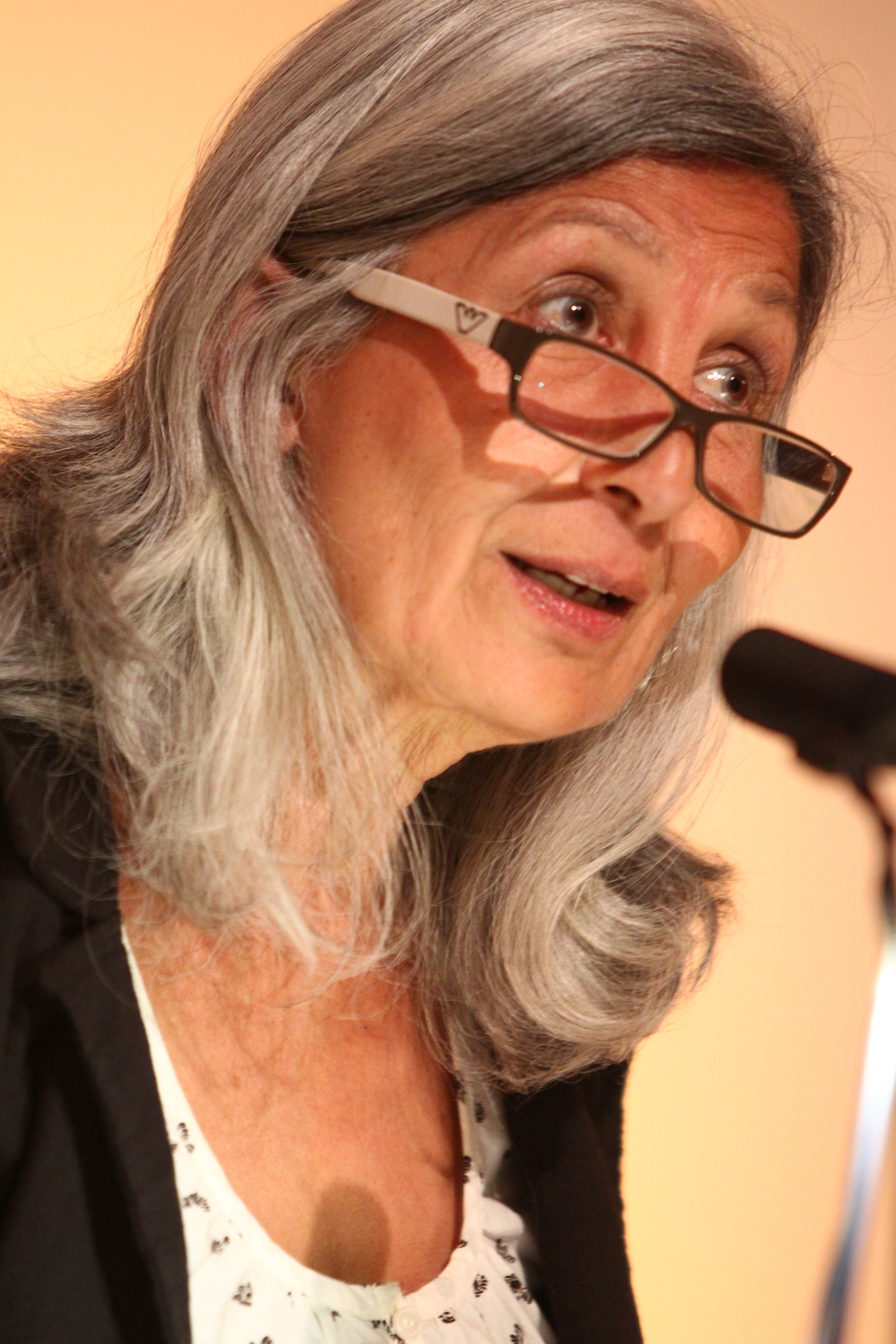
- Khalvati at the British Library in 2011
- Born: 28 April 1944 (age 82); Tehran, Iran
- Education: University of Neuchâtel; SOAS University of London
- Occupation: Poet
- Awards: King's Gold Medal for Poetry, 2023
- Website: www.mimikhalvati.co.uk

Mimi Khalvati (born 28 April 1944) is an Iranian-born British poet. She is the recipient of the King's Gold Medal for Poetry for 2023, awarded for "her outstanding talent and ability to draw on diverse cultural traditions – Iranian, English and American – to enrich British poetry".

== Life and career ==
She was born in Tehran, Iran, on 28 April 1944. She grew up on the Isle of Wight and was educated in Switzerland at the University of Neuchâtel, and in London at the Drama Centre and the School of Oriental and African Studies.

She then worked as a theatre director in Tehran, translating from English into Persian and devising new plays, as well as co-founding the Theatre in Exile group.

She now lives in London Borough of Hackney, and is a Visiting Lecturer at Goldsmiths College and a director of the London Poetry School.

Khalvati was 47 when her first book was published in 1991. Its title, In White Ink, derives from the work of Hélène Cixous who claimed that women in the past have written "in white ink". Michael Schmidt observes that Khalvati is "formally a most resourceful poet".

She was elected a Fellow of the Royal Society of Literature in 2009.

Khalvati is the founder of The Poetry School, running poetry workshops and courses in London, and is co-editor of the school's first two anthologies of new writing: Tying the Song and Entering The Tapestry. She is also tutor at the Arvon Foundation, and has taught creative writing at universities and colleges in the United States of America and Britain.

Her most recent collection of poems, Afterwardness, was a 2019 Poetry Book Society Winter Wild Card choice, as well as a Sunday Times Book of the Year. In 2019, she also selected poems for and introduced the Candlestick Press anthology Ten Poems about Childhood.

In January 2024, Khalvati was announced as the 2023 recipient of the King's Gold Medal for Poetry, awarded for excellence in poetry.

== Works ==
- In White Ink (Carcanet Press, 1991)
- Mirrorwork (Carcanet Press, 1995)
- Entries on Light (Carcanet Press, 1997)
- Selected Poems (Carcanet Press, 2000)
- The Chine (Carcanet Press, 2002)
- The Meanest Flower (Carcanet Press, 2007)
- Child: new and selected poems 1991–2011
- The Weather Wheel (Carcanet Press, 2014)
- Afterwardness (Carcanet Press, 2019)

== Quotes ==
- "There is some poetry in the universe, in the world we live in. What poets do is to first be alive to it, and awake and receptive to it, and in love with it – I think it has a lot to do with love – and then have the wherewithal to translate that poetry that’s out there into poems, so, for me it’s an act of listening and of translating into heard and written language."
