= New Blood (book) =

1999 poetry anthology

New Blood (ISBN 1-85224-472-0) is an anthology of British and Commonwealth poetry edited by Neil Astley and published by Bloodaxe Books in 1999.

== Critical reception ==
Poets are introduced by short paragraphs put together by the editor, but often featuring blurb-like quotes from other contributors to the anthology; New Blood has been criticized as being "a family affair" ... "one feels one has stumbled, cold and sober, on a stranger’s wedding reception, where everyone has long since become embarrassingly intimate."

== Contributors ==
In the order presented in the anthology the contributors are: John Kinsella · Pauline Sainer · Deborah Randall · Marion Lomax · Imtiaz Dharker · Geoff Hattersley · Brendan Cleary · Maura Dooley · W. N. Herbert · Jackie Kay · Ian Duhig · Elizabeth Garrett · Linda France · Anne Rouse · Moniza Alvi · Stephen Knight · Katie Donovan · Chris Greenhalgh · Ann Sansom · Tracy Ryan · Maggie Hannan · Gwyneth Lewis · Julia Copus · Eleanor Brown · Tracey Herd · Katrina Porteous · Roddy Lumsden · Gillian Ferguson · Jane Holland · Jackie Hardy · Clare Pollard · Frieda Hughes · Nick Drake · Amanda Dalton · Christina Whitehead · Polly Clark · Joanne Limburg · Jane Griffiths
