= Neil Astley =

English publisher and editor (born 1953)

Neil Astley Hon. FRSL
- Born: 12 May 1953 (age 73); Portchester, Hampshire, England
- Education: Newcastle University
- Occupations: Publisher, editor and writer
- Known for: Founder of Bloodaxe Books

Neil Astley, Hon. FRSL (born 12 May 1953) is an English publisher, editor and writer. He is best known as the founder of the poetry publishing house Bloodaxe Books.

== Life and work ==
Astley was born in Portchester, Hampshire, and grew up in nearby Fareham. He was educated at Price's School, Fareham (1964–71), the Alliance Française, Paris (1972), and Newcastle University (1975–78 and 1979–81).

From 1972 to 1975 he worked in Leicester, Colchester, London, Paris and Australia, as a journalist, in publishing (Yale University Press), and as a press officer for Warner Brothers' magazine division and for Lyons Maid ice cream. In his essay "The Story of Bloodaxe", he recounts two early life-changing experiences, the first in France in 1972 when he "spent six months in post-'68 Paris... and was radicalised". The second was in Darwin, Australia, where he was working as a sub-editor on the Northern Territory News: "On Christmas Day, 1974, Darwin was destroyed by Cyclone Tracy. I was trapped under a collapsed house. This brush with death was enough to send me post haste to Newcastle, where I was soon working as a bus conductor while waiting to start my course."

In Newcastle upon Tyne, while studying for his degree at the university, he worked as production editor on Jon Silkin's Stand magazine for three years, helped organise poetry readings at Morden Tower, and became involved with small press editing and publishing.

=== Bloodaxe ===
After graduating in 1978 with a first in English, Astley founded his poetry publishing house Bloodaxe Books in Newcastle upon Tyne. He ran it alone from home while doing postgraduate research and other jobs, until it could pay him a wage seven years later. In 1982, he secured Bloodaxe's first annual funding from Northern Arts, later superseded by more substantial annual grant support from Arts Council England. In 1984 he moved the press into its first office, in the Exchange Buildings on Newcastle's Quayside.

Bloodaxe is based in Hexham, Northumberland. As Bloodaxe's sole editor and managing director, Astley has published more than a thousand books by more than 400 writers, and edits, produces and typesets all the press's annual output of around 30 new titles a year.

Bloodaxe won the Northern Electric Arts Award in 1989 and the Sunday Times Small Publisher of the Year Award in 1990. In 1995 Astley was given an honorary DLitt by Newcastle University, where he has been a visiting fellow at its School of English Literature, Language and Linguistics since 2000. This has involved publishing the series of annual Newcastle/Bloodaxe Poetry Lectures given at the university.

Astley's stated aim has been to achieve editorial breadth and balance by publishing what he believes to be the best of many different kinds of poetry: "The only positive discrimination I have exercised has been in favour of literary quality", which has involved commissioning several anthologies designed to redress imbalances in the availability of writing by women or minorities, including Jeni Couzyn's Bloodaxe Book of Contemporary Women Poets (1985), E. A. Markham's Hinterland: Caribbean Poetry from the West Indies and Britain (1989), Deryn Rees-Jones's Modern Women Poets (2005), published as the companion anthology to a critical study, Consorting with Angels (2005), Jeet Thayil's Bloodaxe Book of Contemporary Indian Poets (2008), Out of Bounds: British Black & Asian Poets (ed. Jackie Kay, James Procter and Gemma Robinson, 2012), and three anthologies of emerging black and minority ethnic poets mentored through The Complete Works project established by Spread the Word, Ten: new poets (ed. Bernardine Evaristo and Daljit Nagra, 2010), Ten: the new wave (ed. Karen McCarthy Woolf, 2014) and Ten: poets of the new generation (ed. Karen McCarthy Woolf, 2017).

Astley discovered many of the notable poets to emerge in British poetry over the past three decades: "Astley was the first to publish some of the major players", Daisy Goodwin reported in a 1993 Guardian profile. These included Simon Armitage, David Constantine, Maura Dooley, Ian Duhig, Helen Dunmore, Jen Hadfield, Jackie Kay, Gwyneth Lewis, Glyn Maxwell, Sean O'Brien, Jo Shapcott and Pauline Stainer, many of whom are still published by his firm. Bloodaxe has attracted poets from other commercial poetry lists, including Philip Gross and Susan Wicks from Faber, Selima Hill and Peter Reading from Chatto, R. S. Thomas from Macmillan, Ken Smith from Cape, Adrian Mitchell from Allison & Busby, Brendan Kennelly from a variety of Irish presses, and eight poets from the distinguished poetry list discontinued by Oxford University Press in 1999: Fleur Adcock, Moniza Alvi, Basil Bunting, Roy Fisher, Carole Satyamurti, Penelope Shuttle, Anne Stevenson and George Szirtes.

Philip Gross and George Szirtes went on to win the T. S. Eliot Prize with Bloodaxe collections, as did Jen Hadfield from Shetland, with her second collection. He has also sought to redress the neglect of marginalised poets, publishing important collected editions of writers such as Martin Bell (1988), James Wright (1992), Basil Bunting (2000), Barry MacSweeney (2003), Martin Carter (2006), Arun Kolatkar (2010), A. S. J. Tessimond (2010), Bernard Spencer (2011) and Richard Murphy (2013), as well as a seminal readers' edition of Edward Thomas: The Annotated Collected Poems (2008) edited by Edna Longley. In 2014, his ten-year search to find and republish the poet Rosemary Tonks, who famously "disappeared" in 1979 after severing all contact with the literary world, bore fruit with her posthumously published Bedouin of the London Evening: Collected Poems & Selected Prose.

In 1985, Astley encountered translations in an American magazine of poems by Irina Ratushinskaya, a young Russian poet then imprisoned in a Soviet prison camp for the "crime" of writing and distributing poems a judge had called "a danger to the state". At the age of 28, she had been sentenced to seven years' hard labour. He commissioned a translator, David McDuff, to produce a book of her poetry in English, which he combined with documentary material on the poet's imprisonment obtained from Amnesty International. It included extracts from a camp diary charting life in the "Small Zone", a special unit for women prisoners of conscience in Mordovia, where the poet was held. The resulting book, No, I'm Not Afraid, was published in May 1986. An international campaign was mounted on her behalf, spearheaded by her own poetry, which led to her release in October 1986 on the eve of the Reykjavík Summit, after Mikhail Gorbachev and Ronald Reagan had been given copies of her book by David Owen.

Astley also published Tony Harrison's v. (1985), a book-length poem set in a vandalised cemetery in Leeds during the miners' strike. Two years after its publication, Richard Eyre's film of the work on Channel 4 sparked a national furore, not over Harrison's left-wing politics, but over his skinhead protagonist's use of "bad language". Astley's response was to assemble a new edition of v. (1989) including the poem with documentation of the newspaper and other media coverage which became a set text on cultural studies courses.

Astley has commissioned books representing or addressing the poetry of particular generations or periods in British and Irish poetry, including the anthologies A Rumoured City (introduced by Philip Larkin, edited by Douglas Dunn, 1982), The New Poetry (edited by Michael Hulse, David Kennedy and David Morley, 1993), The Bloodaxe Book of 20th Century Poetry from Britain and Ireland (edited by Edna Longley, 2000), The New Irish Poets (edited by Selina Guinness, 2004), Voice Recognition (edited by James Byrne and Clare Pollard, 2009), Identity Parade: New Poets from Britain and Ireland (edited by Roddy Lumsden, 2010) and Dear World & Everyone In It: new poetry in the UK (edited by Nathan Hamilton, 2013). In addition there have been books of essays, such as Sean O'Brien's The Deregulated Muse (1998), Strong Words (edited by W.N. Herbert and Matthew Hollis, 2000) and Deryn Rees-Jones's Modern Women Poets (2005).

=== Other activities ===
Astley is a patron of the Ledbury Poetry Festival, having previously served on its board as a trustee. He has also been a development committee member of Cúirt International Literature Festival in Galway, Ireland, an organiser of Newcastle Literary Festival, and a director for three years of the Poetry Book Society, responsible for adding poetry in translation to the society's remit. He guest-edited the Spring 2015 issue of the US literary journal Ploughshares, the first all-poetry issue in its 44-year history.

He has been a contributor to numerous radio and television programmes in Britain and Ireland, including the Today Programme, Front Row, Midweek and Start the Week on BBC Radio 4, The Verb on BBC Radio 3, University Challenge on BBC Two, GMTV's The Sunday Programme, and The Arts Show and Poetry Now on RTÉ.

In 2018 he was made an honorary Fellow of the Royal Society of Literature.

== Reception ==
As editor at Bloodaxe for more than 30 years, Astley has been credited with "revolutionising" and democratising poetry publishing in Britain. Praised for his "omnivorous inclusiveness", he has given readers "as wide a range as possible of contemporary poetry by all kinds of writers", in so doing bringing more readers to contemporary poetry. This involved overturning an earlier bias favouring Oxbridge-educated male writers from south-east England, and publishing leading poets from America, the Caribbean and Europe (including many collections and anthologies of translated poetry from France, Russia, Eastern Europe and Scandinavia in particular), alongside books by new and established poets from all parts of Britain and Ireland, the latter ranging from modernists Basil Bunting and J.H. Prynne to performance poets John Agard and Benjamin Zephaniah. He has sought to open up publishing opportunities for women poets, "not because they are women poets but because they are outstanding writers by any standard. For many years Bloodaxe has been unusual in having a poetry list which is 50:50 male: female", and being "responsive to the changing literatures of Britain and of other countries", so that in 2010 it was possible for a leading Black British writer, Bernardine Evaristo, to observe that "a single imprint, Bloodaxe Books, publishes nearly all the poets not with specialist black and Asian imprints, while several other prominent UK poetry publishers do not publish any black or Asian poets from Britain".

Astley has been called "the UK's leading anthologist", best known for Staying Alive: real poems for unreal times (2002), Britain's biggest selling anthology of contemporary poetry since publication, one of several books he has published aimed at broadening the readership of contemporary poetry and re-igniting the interest of readers who haven't read much poetry since school. A US edition was published in 2003 by Miramax, launched by Astley in New York as a book "for people who know they love poetry and for people who think they don't" at a reading shared with Meryl Streep, Liev Schreiber, Maria Tucci, Nina Cassian, Philip Levine, Glyn Maxwell, Paul Muldoon, Sharon Olds, Alice Quinn and Charles Simic.Staying Alive was a controversial book, popular with readers and booksellers. He has since published the second and third anthologies in his Staying Alive trilogy, Being Alive (2004) and Being Human (2011), which were followed by Essential Poems from the Staying Alive Trilogy (2012). In 2008 he published In Person: 30 Poets, filmed by Pamela Robertson-Pearce, claimed to be "the world's first DVD-anthology", consisting of films on two DVDs of six hours of readings by 30 poets with all the texts included in the accompanying anthology. This was followed in 2017 by In Person: World Poets, a larger compilation featuring 14 hours of readings and features on DVD covering 59 poets from around the world, again with all the texts included in the book.

== Writing ==
In 1982 Astley received an Eric Gregory Award from the Society of Authors for a short collection of his own poems, The Speechless Act, later published by the Mandeville Press in 1984. His first book-length collection, Darwin Survivor (Peterloo Poets, 1988), was given a Poetry Book Society Recommendation. A second book of poems, Biting My Tongue, followed in 1995. He has also published two novels, The End of My Tether (2002/2003), which was shortlisted for the Whitbread First Novel Award, and The Sheep Who Changed the World (2005).

== Bibliography ==
=== As editor (selected list) ===
- Ten North-East Poets (Bloodaxe Books, 1980)
- Poetry with an Edge (Bloodaxe Books, 1988, 1993)
- Tony Harrison: a critical anthology (Bloodaxe Books, 1991)
- New Blood (Bloodaxe Books, 1999)
- Staying Alive: real poems for unreal times (Bloodaxe Books, UK 2002, Miramax Books, USA 2003)
- Pleased to See Me: 69 Very Sexy Poems (Bloodaxe Books, 2003)
- Do Not Go Gentle: poems for funerals (Bloodaxe Books, 2003)
- Being Alive: the sequel to 'Staying Alive' (Bloodaxe Books, 2004)
- Passionfood: 100 love poems (Bloodaxe Books, 2005, 2014)
- Bloodaxe Poetry Introductions I: Alexander, Alvi, Dharker, Kay (Bloodaxe Books, 2006)
- Bloodaxe Poetry Introductions 2: Enzensberger, Holub, Sorescu, Tranströmer (Bloodaxe Books, 2006)
- Bloodaxe Poetry Introductions 3: Gilbert, Hirshfield, Kinnell, Merwin (Bloodaxe Books, 2007)
- Soul Food: nourishing poems for starved minds, with Pamela Robertson-Pearce (Bloodaxe Books, 2007)
- Earth Shattering: ecopoems (Bloodaxe Books, 2007)
- In Person: 30 Poets, with DVDs of films by Pamela Robertson-Pearce (Bloodaxe Books, 2008)
- Being Human: the companion anthology to 'Staying Alive' and 'Being Alive' (Bloodaxe Books, 2011)
- Essential Poems from the Staying Alive Trilogy (Bloodaxe Books, 2012)
- The World Record: international voices from Southbank Centre's Poetry Parnassus, with Anna Selby (Bloodaxe Books/Southbank Centre, 2012)
- The Hundred Years' War: modern war poems (Bloodaxe Books, 2014)
- Ploughshares vol. 41 no.1 (Spring 2015)
- Funny Ha-Ha, Funny Peculiar: a book of strange & comic poems (Bloodaxe Books, 2015)
- In Person: World Poets, with DVDs of films by Pamela Robertson-Pearce (Bloodaxe Books, 2017)
- Land of Three Rivers: the poetry of North-East England (Bloodaxe Books, 2017)
- Staying Human: new poems for Staying Alive (Bloodaxe Books, 2020)

=== Novels ===
- The End of My Tether (Flambard Press, 2002; Scribner, 2003)
- The Sheep Who Changed the World (Flambard Press, 2005)

=== Poetry collections ===
- The Speechless Act (The Mandeville Press, 1984), Eric Gregory Award
- Darwin Survivor (Peterloo Poets, 1988), Poetry Book Society Recommendation
- Biting My Tongue (Bloodaxe Books, 1995)
