= Esther Morgan =

Esther Morgan may refer to:

- Esther Morgan (footballer) (born 2002), Welsh international footballer
- Esther Morgan (poet) (born 1970), British poet
