= A. B. Jackson (poet) =

Scottish poet

Andrew Buchanan Jackson is a Scottish poet, born on 19 June 1965, in Glasgow.

His family moved to the town of Bramhall in Cheshire, where Jackson received his primary school education. The family moved again in 1976, to Cupar in Fife, where he attended Bell Baxter High School.

He studied English literature at Edinburgh University between 1983 and 1987, and it was there that he met fellow student Roddy Lumsden. Together they founded and edited Fox: the Edinburgh University Poetry Magazine, featuring undergraduate poetry and guest contributions from established writers, and ran the Edinburgh University Poetry Society between 1986 and 1987.

He has an MSc in Library and Information Studies from the University of Strathclyde and a PhD in Creative Writing from Sheffield Hallam University.

His first book, Fire Stations, won the Forward Poetry Prize for best first collection in 2003.

His limited edition pamphlet, Apocrypha (Donut Press), was the Poetry Book Society's Pamphlet Choice for summer 2011.

In 2010 he won first prize in the Edwin Morgan Poetry Competition for the poem Treasure Island.

In 2015 his second full collection, The Wilderness Party, was published by Bloodaxe Books and was a Poetry Book Society Recommendation.

His third collection, The Voyage of St Brendan, was published by Bloodaxe Books in 2021.

== Bibliography ==
- Snippets From the Powder Room (privately printed pamphlet, 1990)
- Fire Stations (London: Anvil Press, 2003)
- Poems 1985–1995 (privately printed, 50 copies, 2005)
- Apocrypha (London: Donut Press, 2011), limited edition of 250, signed and numbered.
- The Wilderness Party (Hexham: Bloodaxe Books, 2015)
- The Voyage of St Brendan (Hexham: Bloodaxe Books, 2021)
