= New Blood =

New Blood may refer to:

== Film and television ==
- New Blood (1999 film), a 1999 British-Canadian film
- New Blood (2002 film), a 2002 Hong Kong horror film
- Friday the 13th Part VII: The New Blood, a 1988 horror film
- Fright Night 2: New Blood, a 2013 horror film
- New Blood (TV series), a 2016 British drama
- "New Blood" (Teenage Mutant Ninja Turtles), a 2005 television episode
- "New Blood" (Walking with Dinosaurs), a 1999 television episode
- Dexter: New Blood, a 2021 American crime drama mystery miniseries
- "New Blood" (Doc), a 2025 television episode
- The Traitors: New Blood, the subtitle for the fifth season of the American reality program The Traitors

== Music ==
=== Albums ===
- New Blood (Blood, Sweat & Tears album), 1972
- New Blood (Peter Gabriel album), 2011
- New Blood (Yellow Claw album), 2018
- New Blood, by the Other, 2010

=== Songs ===
- "New Blood", by Bloc Party from Hymns, 2016
- "New Blood", by Gehenna from WW, 2005
- "New Blood", by Pinhead Gunpowder from Pinhead Gunpowder, 2000
- "New Blood", by Robert Cray from Strong Persuader, 1986
- "New Blood", by Screen 3, 1981
- "New Blood", by Their / They're / There, 2013
- "New Blood", by Vice Squad from Shot Away, 1984

== Other uses ==
- New Blood (book), a 1999 poetry anthology
- New Blood Interactive, a video game publisher
- New Blood (professional wrestling), a 2000 WCW wrestling stable
- Trauma Center: New Blood, a 2007 video game
