= Nigh-No-Place =

Collection of poems by Jen Hadfield

- Front Cover
- Author: Jen Hadfield
- Language: English
- Genre: Poetry
- Published: 2008
- Publisher: Bloodaxe Books
- Publication place: United Kingdom
- ISBN: 978 1 78037 028 6

Nigh-No-Place is the second collection of poems written by Jen Hadfield. It was published in 2008 by Bloodaxe Books and won the T. S. Eliot Prize for poetry.

== Book title ==
The book is named after its inaugural poem, "Nigh-No-Place". The poem itself is prefaced with an excerpt from Shakespeare's "Tempest", act 2, scene 2: "I prithee, let me bring thee where crabs grow; and i with my long nails will dig thee pignuts..."

The poem uses non-traditional titles and place names to draw the reader into its literary world.

== Style and content ==
The collection features a variety of styles and formats, including uses blank verse, free verse, prose, and several metrical patterns. Onomatopoeia is used throughout, as well as alliteration and fine sensory detail. She also sprinkles her text with Scottish words and phrases such as "trow" and "stumba" ("dense mist or fog").

She divides the book into three sections of related poems. The first section, "The Mandolin of May", deals with the wilderness of Canada and man's fear of and dependence upon it. The second portion, "Nigh-No-Place", describes the culture, folklore, traditions, and landscapes of Shetland Islands, Scotland. The final section, "Seven Burra Poems", is inspired specifically by Burra, the collective name of two islands (East Burra and West Burra) it the Shetland archipelago.

== Themes and literary devices ==
The settings of this book are the wilderness of northwestern Canada (in the Mandolin of May), the Shetland Islands, Scotland (Nigh-No-Place) and Burra, Shetland (Seven Burra Poems). It features several narrative poems that alternate between the first- and third person perspective as well as free-form verses and in a stream of consciousness style. She occasionally devotes entire pages to the clarification of a word or theme, sometimes a single word or sound is the theme. She often makes her point using animals' calls, cries, and grunts in repeating structures, with literary critic Stephen Knight noting her "use [of] white space, at one point evoking a silence into which a bird calls." Animals are the main focus of much of the material and she spends a great deal of time detailing them extensively and examining their behavior without resorting to simple anthropomorphization. One example of this is the poem "Paternoster", which is a recitation of The Lord's Prayer, but from the perspective of a draft horse. This could be an illustration of bathos or blasphemy, depending on the inclination of the reader. Nevertheless, she attempts to record the connection between man and nature without justifying or condemning it. Some poems are somber, reflective pieces and others are light hearted celebrations of the flora and fauna of her environment.

== Awards ==
Nigh-No-Place won the T. S. Eliot Prize for poetry in 2008 when Hadfield was 30, making her the youngest female winner of the prize and the youngest overall until Ocean Vuong won in 2017 at the age of 29. Andrew Motion, then the British poet laureate and chair of the judges panel (Motion, Lavinia Greenlaw, and Tobias Hill), said "Nigh-No-Place shows that she [Hadfield] is a remarkably original poet near the beginning of what is obviously going to be a distinguished career".
