= Roddy Lumsden =

Scottish poet (1966–2020)

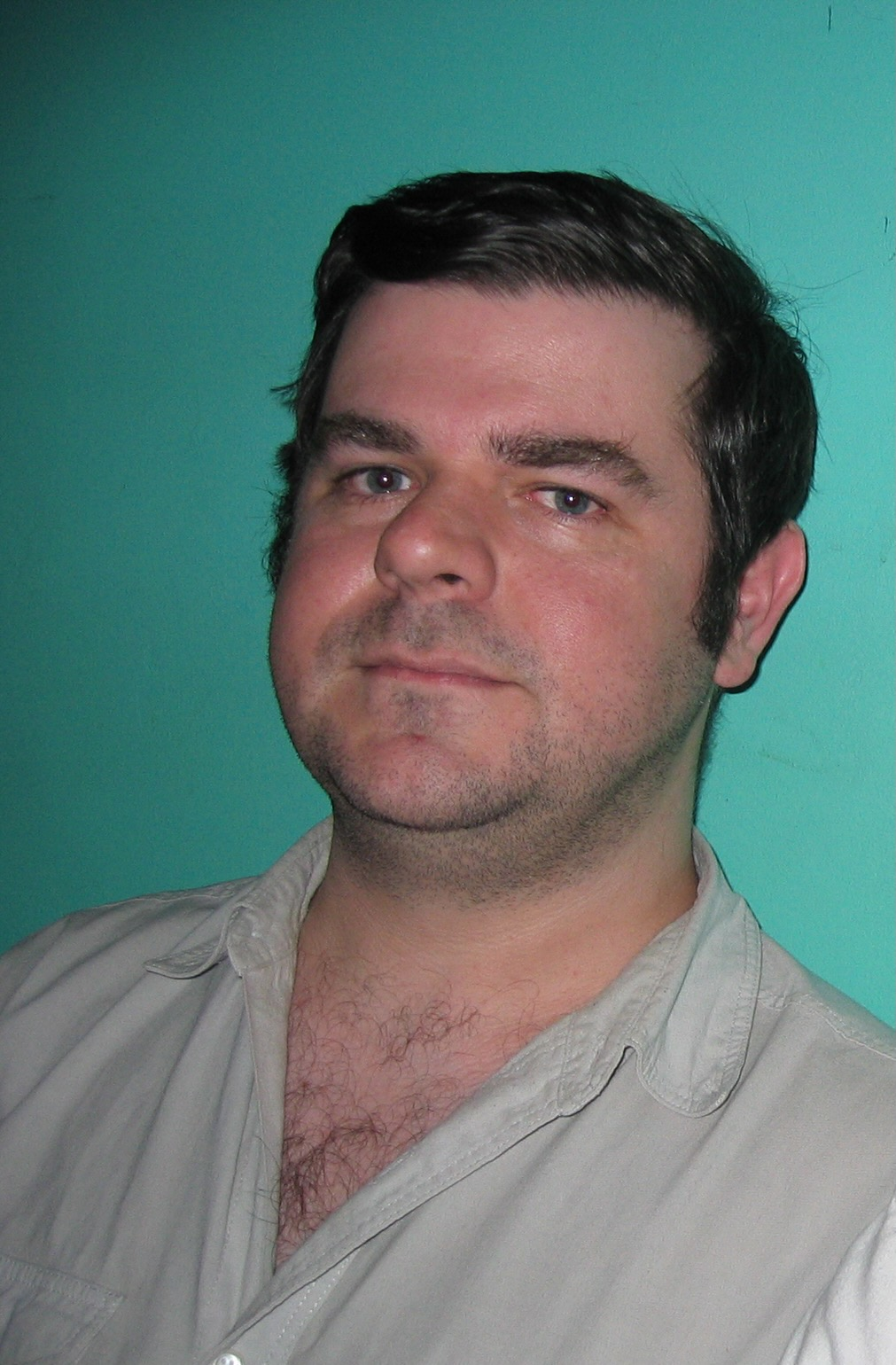
- Born: Roderick Chalmers Lumsden; 28 May 1966
- Died: 10 January 2020; London
- Education: Madras College, St Andrews University of Edinburgh

Roderick Chalmers "Roddy" Lumsden (28 May 1966 – 10 January 2020) was a Scottish poet, writing mentor and quizzer. He was born in St Andrews and educated at Madras College and the University of Edinburgh. He published seven collections of poetry, a number of pamphlets, and a collection of trivia. He also edited a generational anthology of British and Irish poets of the 1990s and 2000s, Identity Parade (Bloodaxe Books, 2010), and The Salt Book of Younger Poets (Salt Publishing, 2011). His collections The Book of Love (Bloodaxe Books, 2000) and So Glad I'm Me (Bloodaxe Books, 2017) were shortlisted for the T. S. Eliot Prize.

== St Andrews - Early Life and Schooling (1966-1984) ==
Lumsden was born in St Andrews on 28 May 1966, the youngest child of three, after brothers Jimmy and Eric. His father James (known as Hamish) was an electrician and played the drums in a touring dance band; his mother Elizabeth (known as Betty, née Lumsden, but not related, as he was fond of pointing out) worked in the accommodation service of the university.

The Lumsdens lived on Lamond Drive, one of the arterial roads that cross the length of St Andrews. The area is what passes for working class in St Andrews, but would count as lower middle class in most other Scottish small towns.

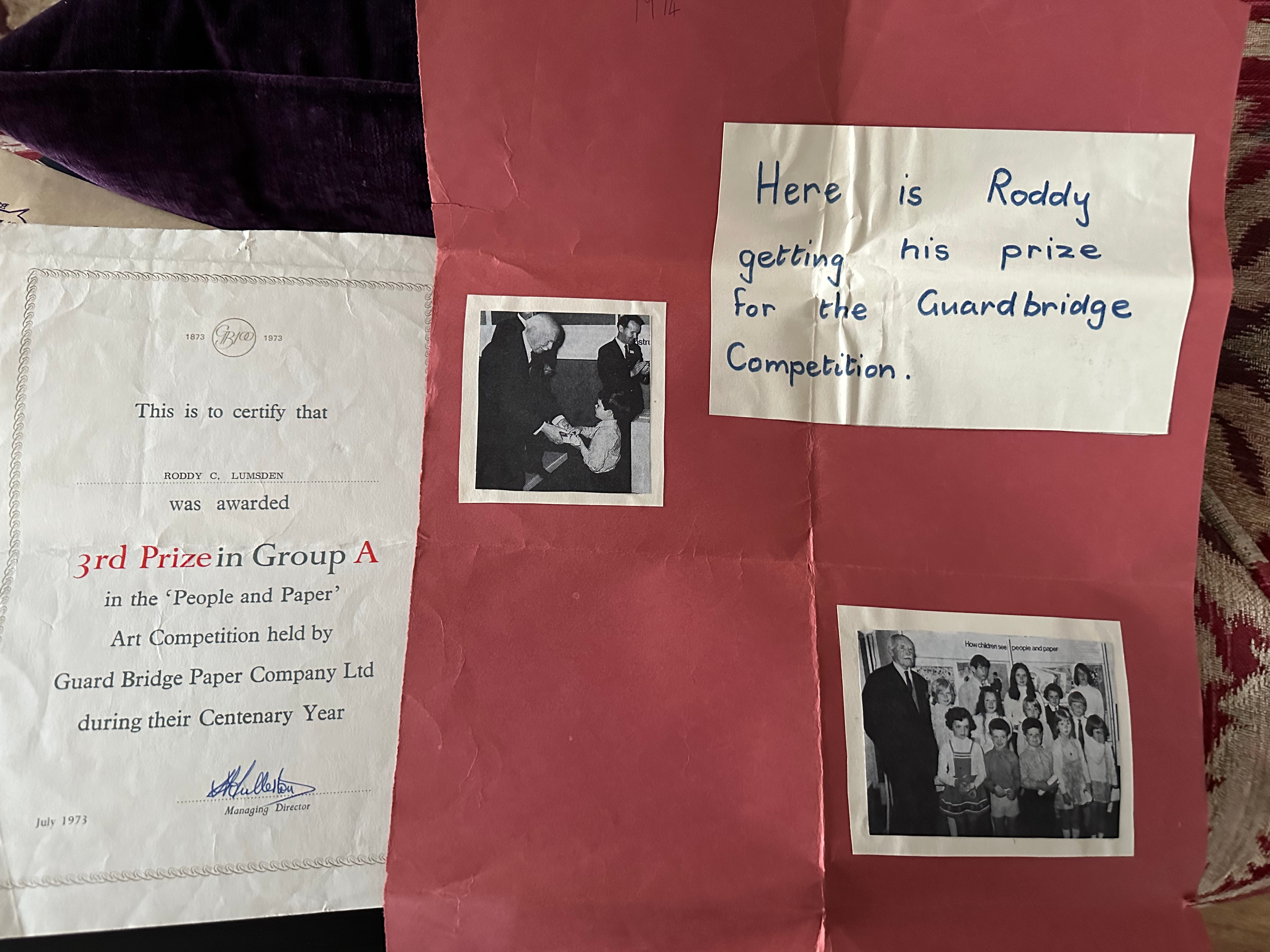
Roddy Lumsden receiving a writing prize at age 6, alongside the certificate itself.

He shared a childhood bedroom with his elder brother Eric, who would from an early age read novels to him and would let him play his records: artists such as Roxy Music, Supertramp, David Bowie, Steve Harley, early Genesis, and Monty Python.

At age 6, Lumsden won third prize in the People and Paper writing competition organised by the Guardbridge Paper Company.

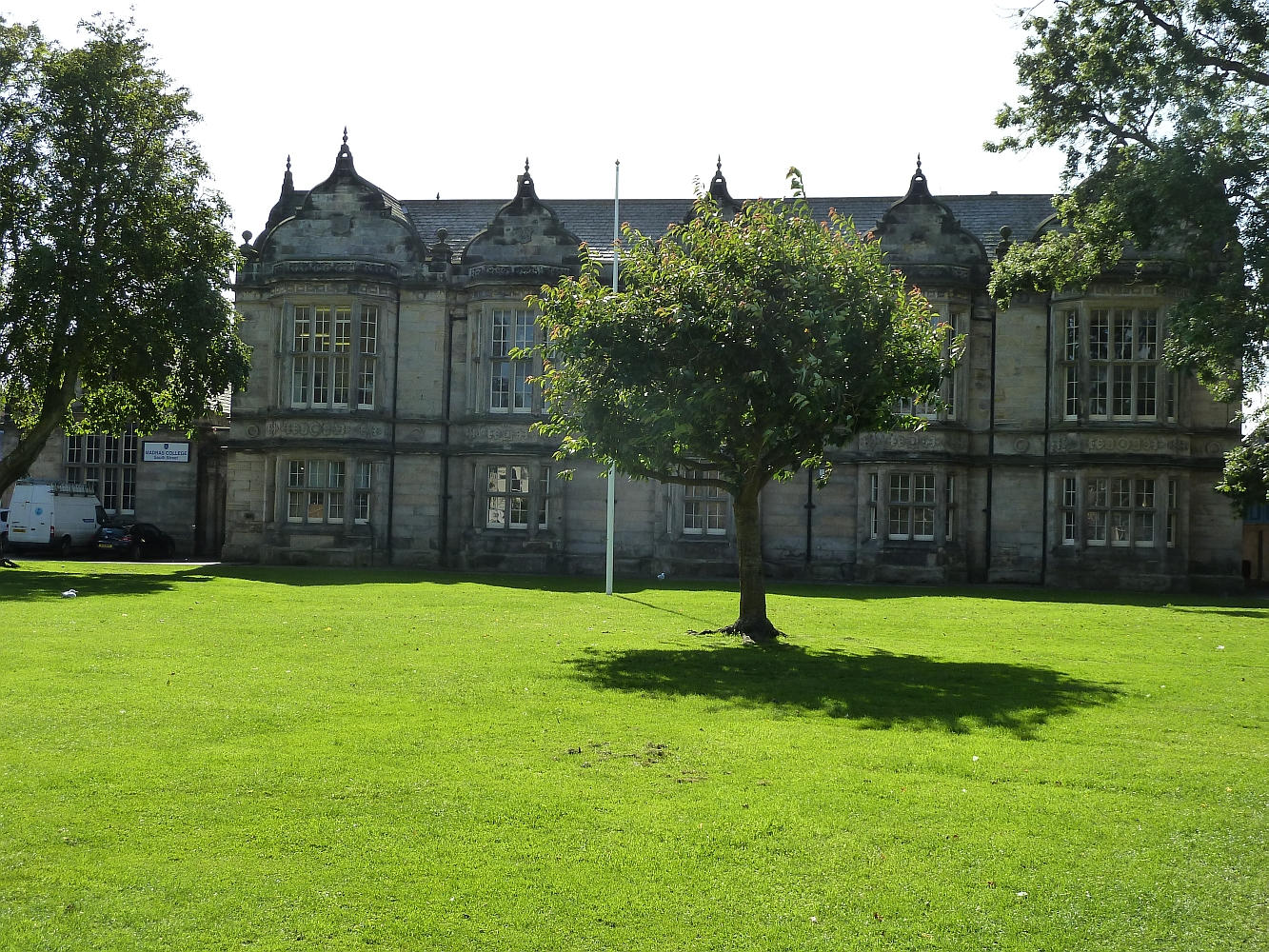
Madras College, St Andrews

Lumsden attended Langlands Primary School where, due to recurring outbreaks of warts on his fingers, his friends nicknamed him Werty. He went on to attend Madras College, a comprehensive school in St Andrews that is often mistaken for a private school, due to its architecture and the remains of a fifteenth-century chapel in its grounds. As Lumsden himself said in an interview when talking about his childhood influences, "Another significant factor was my high school, Madras College, a comprehensive which has the sort of teaching standards expected of top private schools."

Having secured the necessary Highers to get into the University of Edinburgh, Lumsden decided to leave school halfway through his final year.

== Edinburgh - University and Finding His Voice (1984-1997) ==
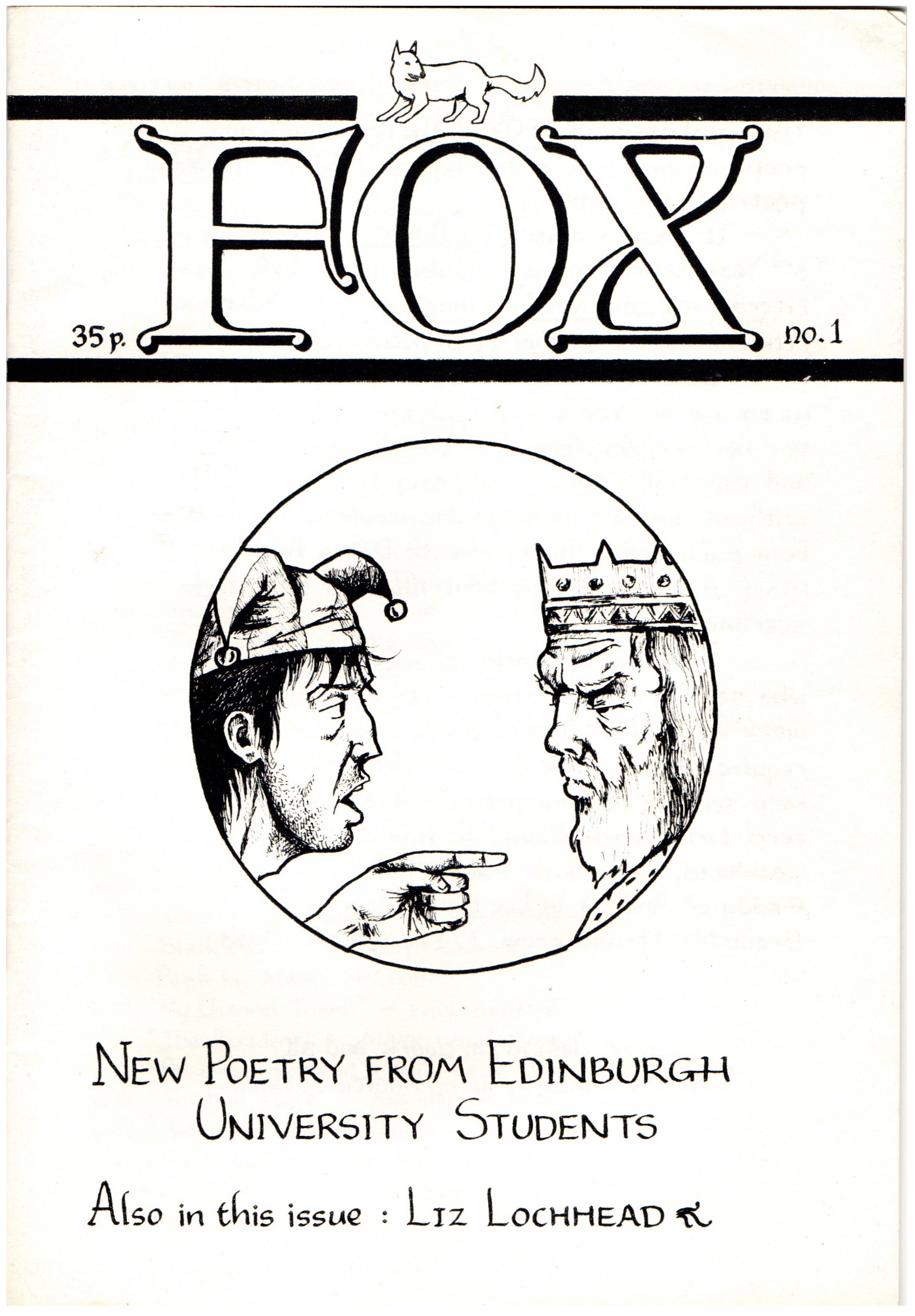
Cover of Fox Issue 1 - edited by Roddy Lumsden and AB Jackson

In September 1984 he began a three-year MA General Arts degree at the University of Edinburgh. Modules included those delivered by the School of Scottish Studies in George Square, while Hamish Henderson was still teaching there. For those three years he lived in Pollock Halls of Residence, on the ground floor of Lee House (room G07). At the start of his second year in 1985 he made the acquaintance of A. B. Jackson, then in his third year of an English Literature degree. Together they decided to start an undergraduate poetry magazine, titled Fox, which also featured new work from Liz Lochhead, Norman MacCaig, Ron Butlin, Brian McCabe, and Edwin Morgan. They went on to edit three issues between 1986 and 1987 before handing over the editorship to others. As for Lumsden’s own work, he received feedback and encouragement from Liz Lochhead, writer-in-residence at the university from 1985 to 1987, and Anne Stevenson, writer-in-residence from 1987 to 1989.

Of his early influences, Lumsden has said: "definitely Prufrock. The whole of George MacBeth's Longman British Poetry 1900-65, which was the staple schoolbook and introduced me to Larkin (especially), Gunn, Eliot and Plath. Ondaatje and Bukowski and Alden Nowlan and Paul Durcan while a student. Scottish writers, of course – particularly W.S. Graham, whose ‘Malcolm Mooney's Land’ I had found in the Penguin post-war poetry book [British Poetry Since 1945, edited by Edward Lucie-Smith] – and then the ones I saw reading – MacCaig, Morgan, Dunn, Lochhead. Also, Cooper Clarke and Cutler on John Peel and song lyrics. This was the post-punk era, when lyrics were quite literate – The Monochrome Set, The Passage, Microdisney, The Smiths [...]."

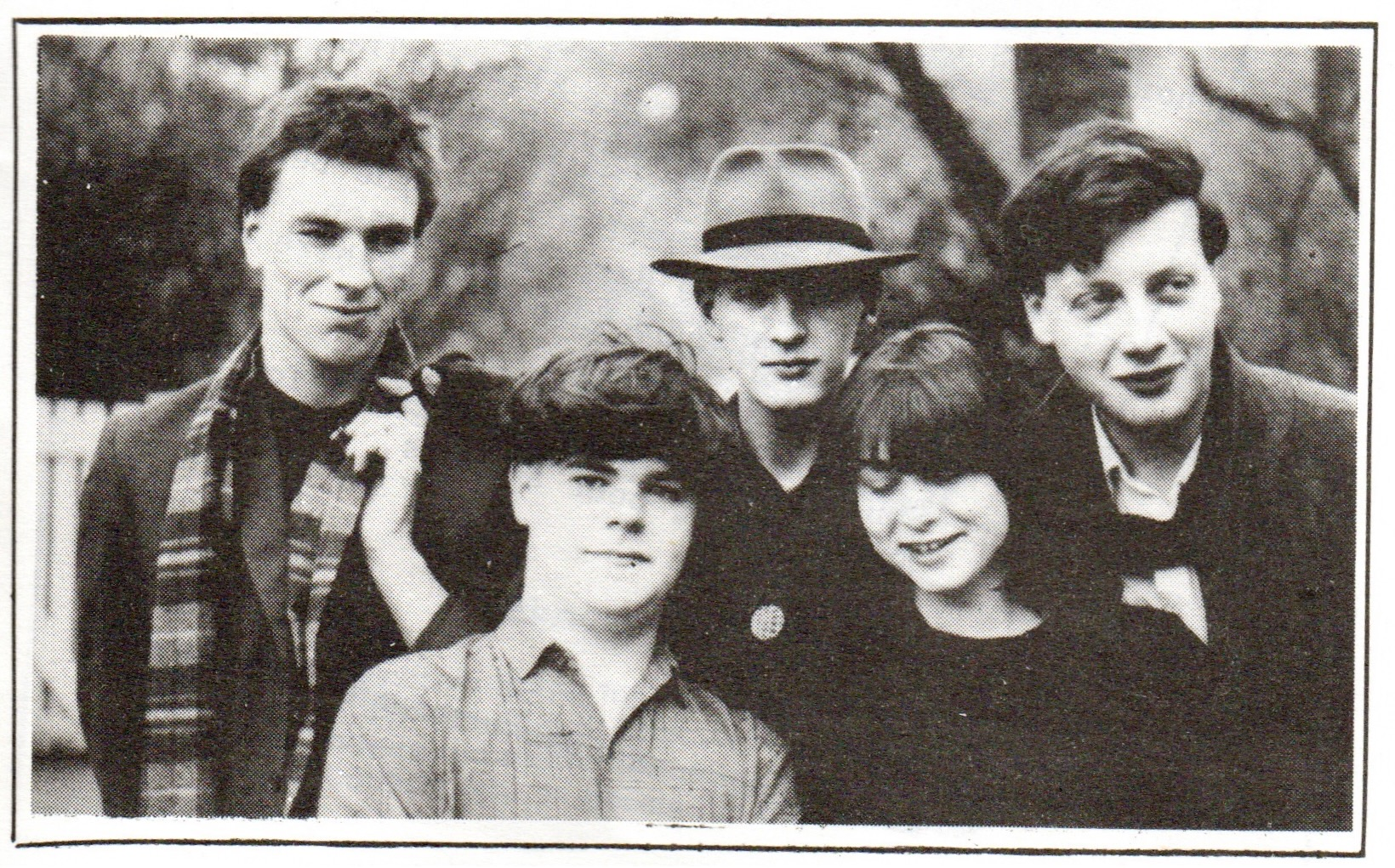
A Walk Through H, featuring Roddy Lumsden (image courtesy of Mark Reed - used with permission)

In his first year, Lumsden was the singer in a student band called "A Walk Through H", named after the Peter Greenaway film, playing post-punk original songs. His interest was more in the words than the music, however, and he soon abandoned his singing duties.

Lumsden was president of the University of Edinburgh Poetry Society from 1986 to 1987. Along with A.B. Jackson (vice president) he was responsible for booking various poets to read at the university, and these included Norman MacCaig, Edwin Morgan, Andrew Greig, Kathleen Jamie, Craig Raine, and Hugo Williams.

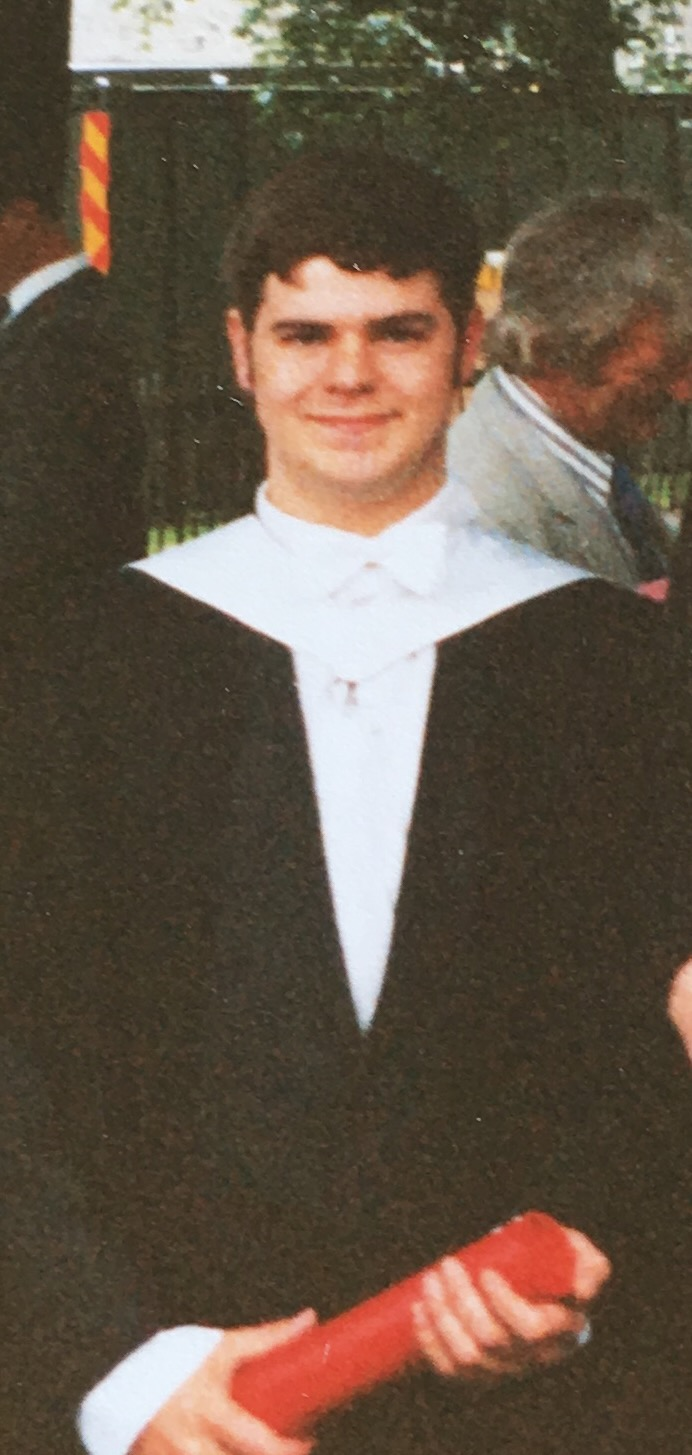
Lumsden on his Graduation Day - 17 July 1987 (image courtesy of Mark Reed - used with permission)

Lumsden graduated on the 17th of July 1987 and moved into 28 Melville Terrace (top floor left) to join A.B. Jackson who had begun renting there the year before. (Coincidentally, Hamish Henderson lived at 20 Melville Terrace.) For the next two years they shared their work with each other and supported their mutual desire to commit to the 'poetry life'. Paul Hullah describes Lumsden in the late 1980s: "He was Black Bo’s [pub, Blackfriars Street, now the Salt Horse], khaki-safari-suited, barrel-chested, dart player polo, touring trivia-machine cracker, erudite in everything."

Neil Cooper’s first impressions of Lumsden in 1986 pick up on the same fashion elements: "He was probably wearing one of those short-sleeved military style shirts he always wore that we used to tease him made him look like a darts player […] [a] slightly strange guy with a baby-faced stare and facial tics I’d later find out were a side effect from the lithium he was still taking then." Cooper also identifies the regular pub haunts: the Pear Tree on West Nicholson Street, the Royal Oak on Infirmary Street, the St James Oyster Bar on Calton Road [now called Bunker], the Antiquary on St Stephen Street.

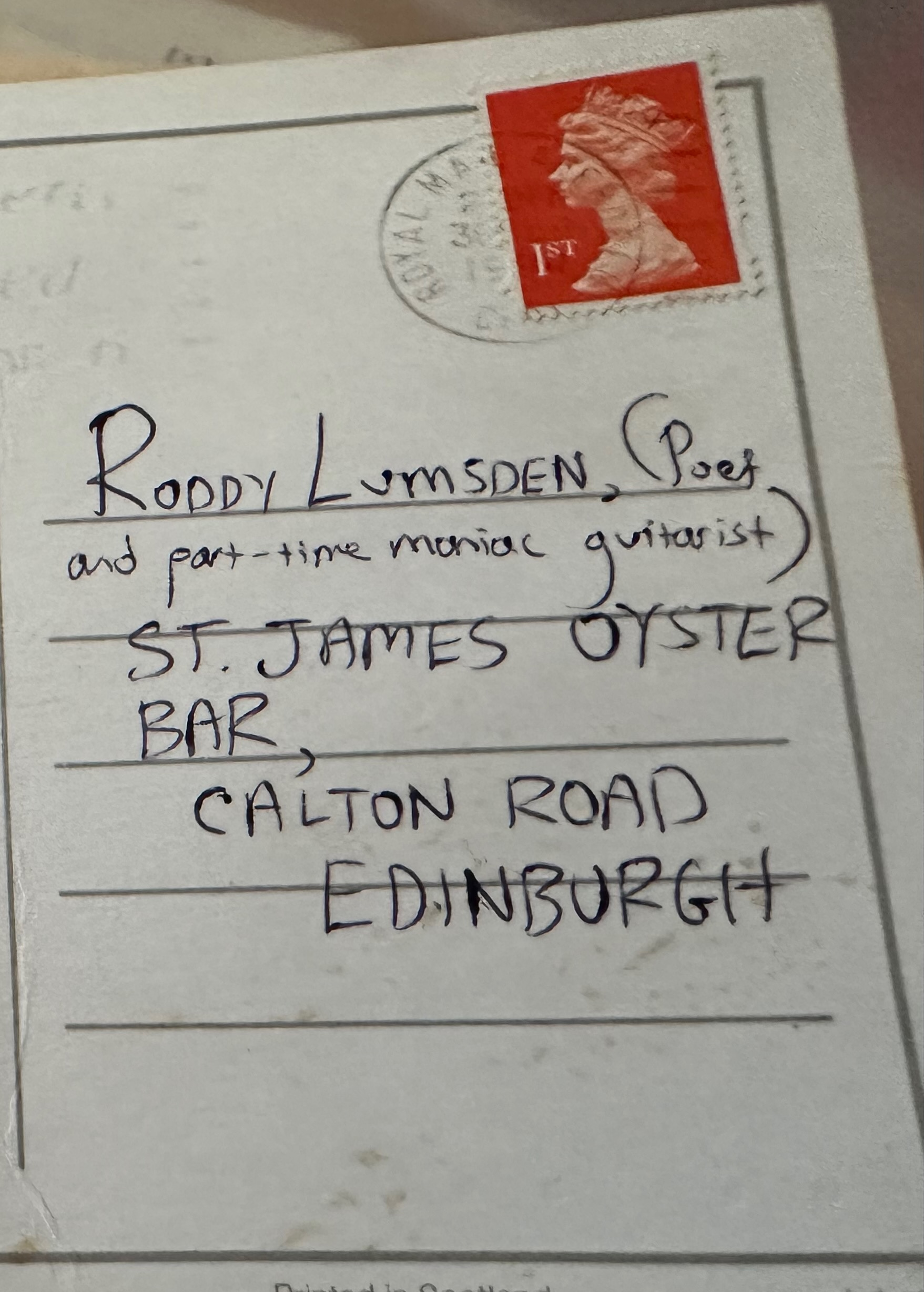
Postcard sent to Roddy Lumsden at the St James Oyster Bar (image courtesy of Mark Reed - used with permission)

During this time he supplemented his dole money by playing trivia machines in the pubs throughout Edinburgh: his skill was such that he was able to empty the machines and make a profit. His ubiquitous presence in pubs made him a recognisable figure: "The poet Roddy Lumsden was such a regular at the St James Oyster Bar that mail was occasionally sent to him there. Roddy – who wrote a fine poem called 'St James Infirmly' – told me: 'If anyone didn’t have my address in the early 1990s, they could be assured that a letter would reach me there, as it was like my second home'." Lumsden was a devotee of The Lost Soul Band, who played regularly at the St James Oyster Bar throughout the early 90s.

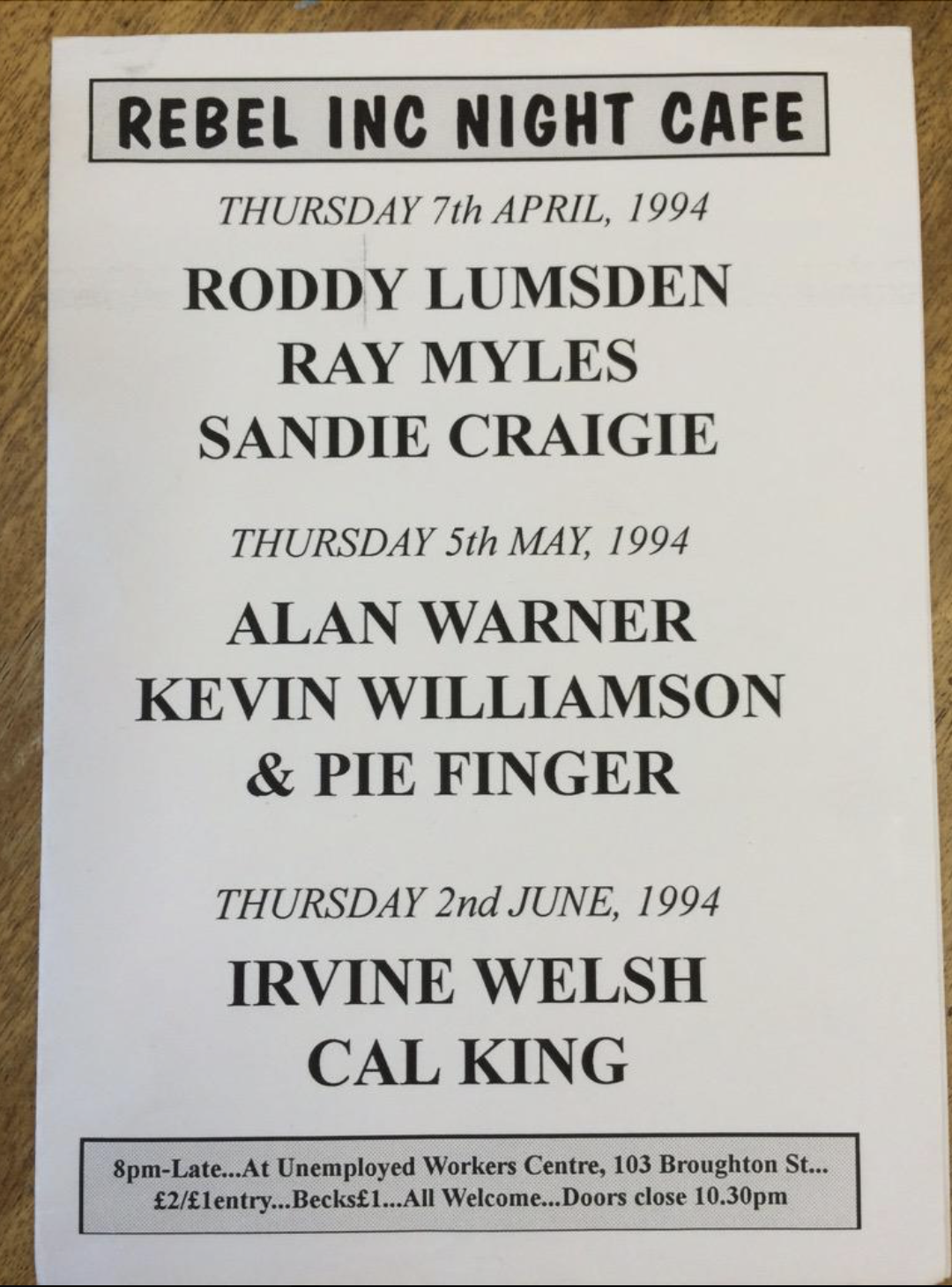
Flyer for Rebel Inc Night Cafe featuring Roddy Lumsden - 1994 (Image by Neil Cooper - used with permission)

From 1990 to 1992 he lived at 34 Home Street in the first floor flat above the Cameo cinema, sharing with A.B. Jackson (again) and the actor Mark McDonnell, then studying drama at Queen Margaret University. Lumsden’s poem 'On Home Street' (Yeah Yeah Yeah) describes the moving-in process. In 1991 he received an Eric Gregory Award, and in 1993 he had eight poems included in Poetry Introduction 8, edited by Christopher Reid and published by Faber and Faber.

Around this time, Lumsden became involved with events involving the Edinburgh counter-culture scene, including the 'Rebel Inc Night Cafe' events in 1994, and Rodney Relax’s Yellow Cafe nights. Here Lumsden met writers who would be a major influence on him during this period including Kevin Williamson, Alan Warner, Irvine Welsh, Gordon Legge, Duncan McLean and the poet Paul Reekie. Williamson later published a poem dedicated to Lumsden's memory after Lumsden's death. Between 1995 and 1996 he was Writing Fellow for the City of Aberdeen, and 1995 also saw the publication of a privately printed, 38-page pamphlet, Elsewhere Perhaps Later, containing many of the poems which would appear in his first full collection, and some (e.g. 'An Engagement', 'from Cavoli Riscaldati') which did not.

August 1997 saw the publication of his first collection, Yeah Yeah Yeah (Bloodaxe Books). The reviews were mixed. Stephen Troussé wrote in Poetry Review: "From the gloomy corners of dank saloons in [the] Cowgate, Lumsden observes the last rites and fist-fights of provincial adolescence with a slangy, slumming formalism which owes as much to Elvis Costello as it does to Simon Armitage […] heavy-handed […] wildly uneven […] the poems pick up when the poet gives his persona the slip." Lumsden’s own response to the perceived Armitage influence was as follows: "I suppose there is a similarity; I certainly like his work more than most of my peers seem to do, though they may be informed by sour grapes (jealousy is rife in this little world). He's a small town working class boy, with a similar record collection to mine, I think. There's bound to be some crossover – I think that as more working class voices come into poetry, we'll see less of them being lazily lumped together by critics." Neil Powell in the TLS was similarly lukewarm but identified some positive aspects: despite occasional "gear-crashing wrenches of register and patches of dense demotic which read like versified Martin Amis […]" there are also poems of "great delicacy". He ends the review: "If there is a fault, or a danger, it lies in the feckless charm of a persona which is slightly too pleased with its hard luck and hangovers: one begins, ungratefully, to long for the contrasting tone of some honest, unironic misery, confident that when it arrives Roddy Lumsden will have the technical resources to handle it." This observation was later quoted by Lumsden as the epigram for his poem 'My Pain' published in Roddy Lumsden is Dead. Despite the reviews, the book was shortlisted for the Forward Prize for Best First Collection, losing out to Robin Robertson's A Painted Field.

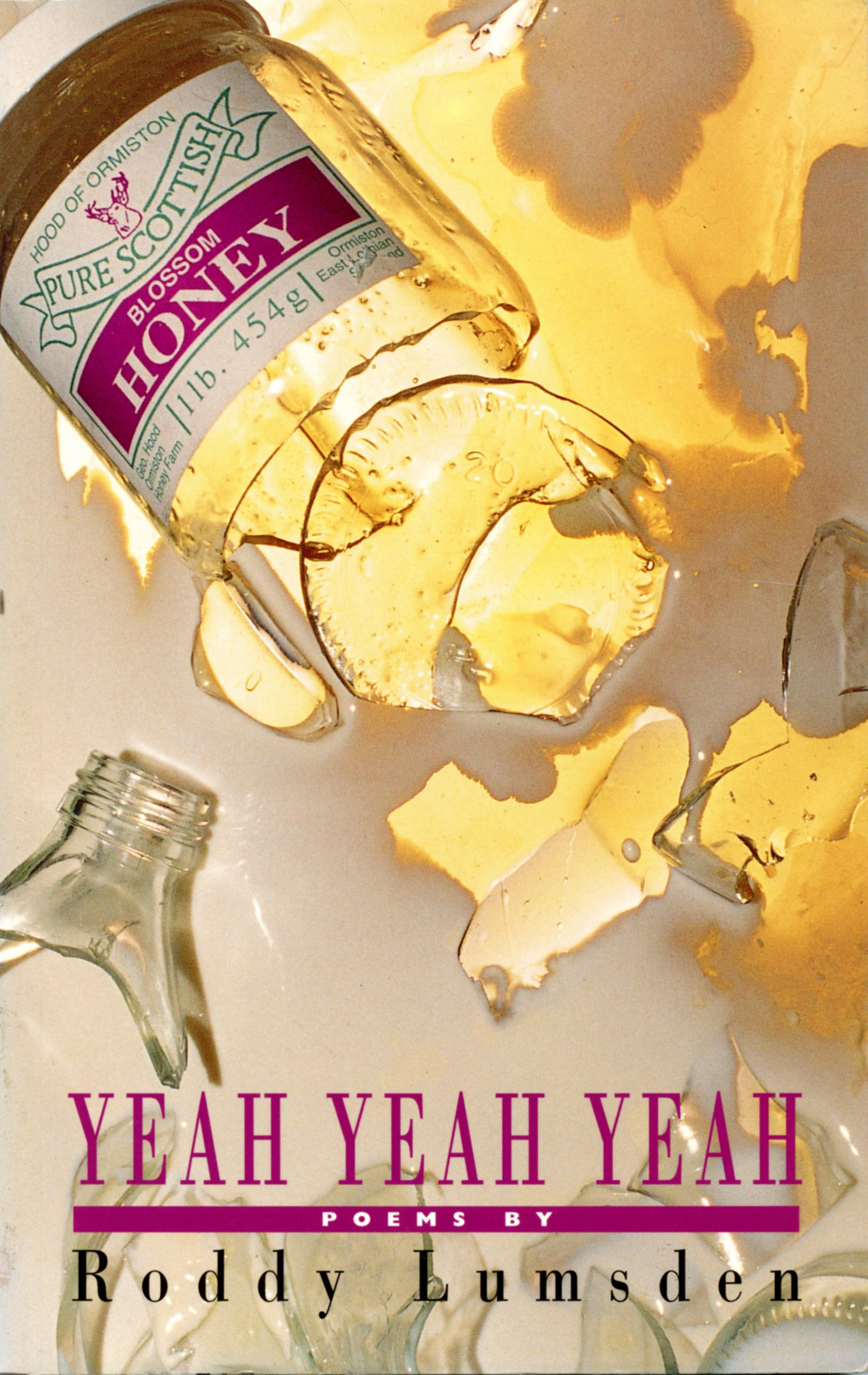
Cover of 'Yeah Yeah Yeah' (Bloodaxe Books)

That same year, Lumsden took part in the New Blood Tour, organised by Bloodaxe Books and featuring five of its new authors: Lumsden, Tracey Herd, Julia Copus, Jane Holland, and Eleanor Brown. The group gave twelve readings across the UK between 27 September and 8 October 1997.

== London - Writing and Teaching (1997-2016) ==
Lumsden moved to London at the end of 1997, staying in Stoke Newington. He quickly became known for staging events at The Poetry Society in Covent Garden (he would later serve as the charity’s vice chair) and was part of the second iteration of a writing group that met at The Lamb pub in Bloomsbury – other members of this group included Michael Donaghy, Hugo Williams, Maurice Riordan, Paul Farley, Greta Stoddart and John Stammers.

A friendship with the barman of the St James Oyster Bar in Edinburgh, Bryan Mills, who became the bassist in the band the Divine Comedy, led to Lumsden performing his poetry supporting the band onstage at the Aldeburgh Festival in 1999.

Another early member of the Divine Comedy, the composer Joby Talbot, used one of Lumsden's poems from Roddy Lumsden Is Dead as the libretto to a choral piece, 'Lost Forever'.

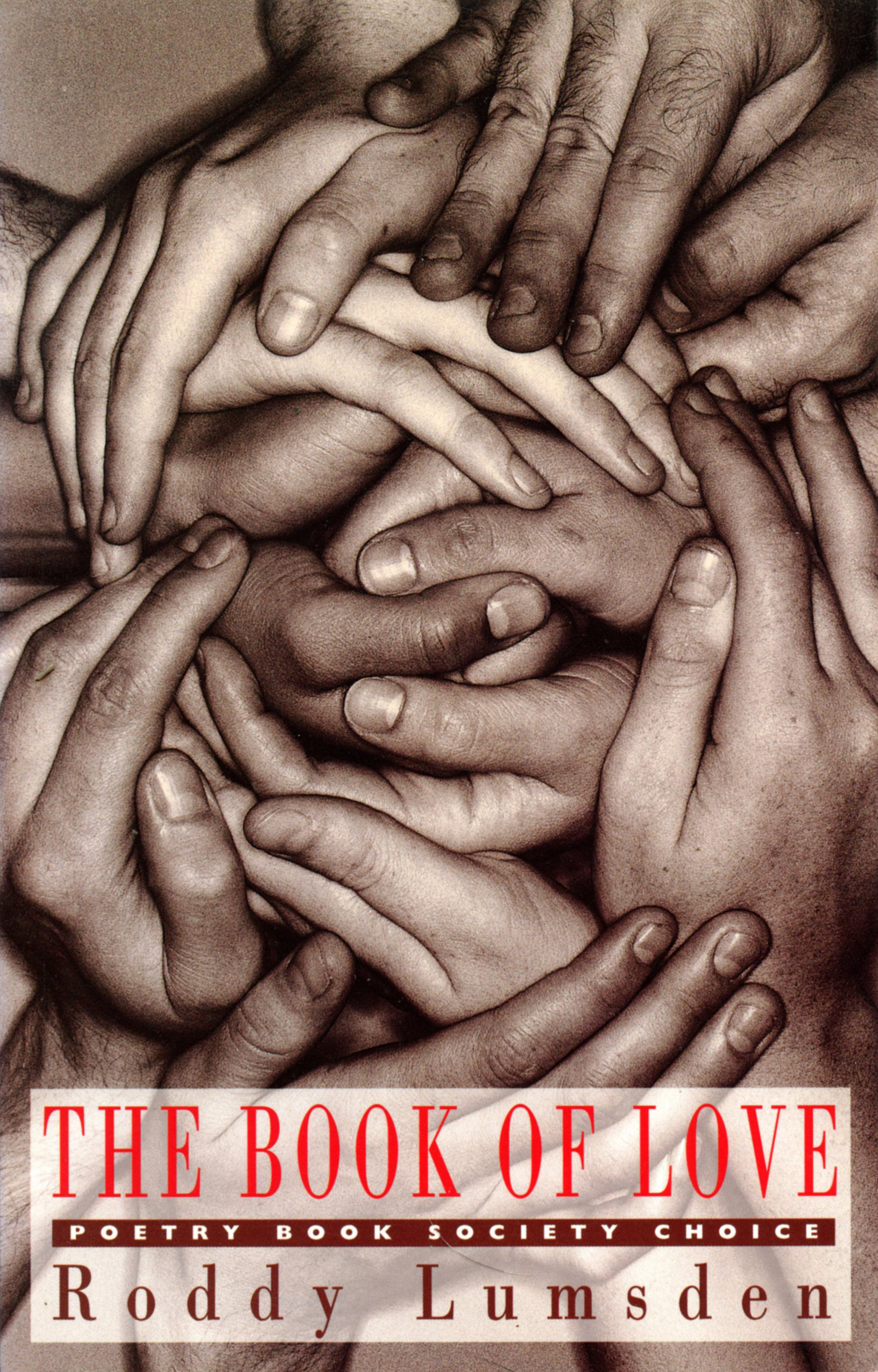
Cover of 'The Book of Love' (Bloodaxe Books)

Whilst in Stoke Newington, Lumsden became involved with the London spoken word poetry scene due to his friendship with Tim Wells and Tim Turnbull. He was seen by many as an instrumental figure in the breaking down of barriers between 'page' and 'stage' in the years to come. Lumsden’s second collection The Book of Love (2000) cemented his burgeoning reputation, securing a Poetry Book Society Choice and being shortlisted for both the T. S. Eliot Prize and The John Llewellyn Rhys Prize. Roddy Lumsden is Dead followed in 2001. In the same year, Lumsden co-edited Anvil New Poets 3 with Hamish Ironside, and this ushered in a new phase of Lumsden as a mentor and promoter of emerging voices on the UK poetry scene.

In 2001 he was awarded an Arts Council of England International Fellowship at the Banff Centre in Alberta, Canada, an experience which he recorded in the poems 'For Jesus', 'Turning Into Grizzly Street' and 'From the Valentine Studio' in Mischief Night. Several residency projects followed, including what he described as being "poet-in-residence to the music industry" and a stint at the St Andrews Bay Hotel in 2002, a five-star hotel and golf resort in St Andrews, which resulted in the pamphlet The Bubble Bride.

By now Lumsden was teaching for The Poetry School, where his role in its early years was described by Mimi Khalvati as "absolutely instrumental in making the School what it is today". After the untimely death of Michael Donaghy in 2004, Lumsden then took over the teaching of Donaghy’s influential evening class at City, University of London. These two teaching roles were the start of a decade of Lumsden's nurturing and promotion of new poets. Mischief Night: New & Selected Poems was a Poetry Book Society Recommendation in 2004.

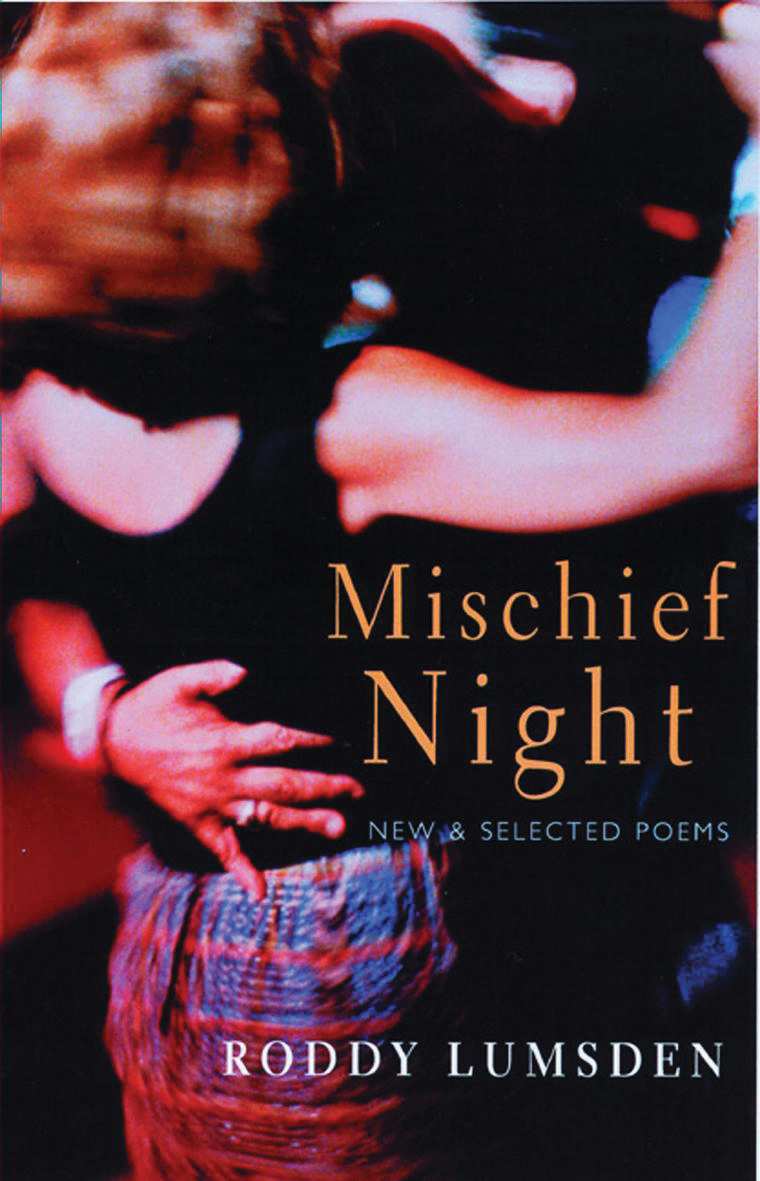
Cover of 'Mischief Night' (Bloodaxe Books)

In 2005, Lumsden released 'Vitamin Q' a book of trivia based on his Internet Blog of the same name. On the 12th and 13 December 2007, Lumsden was on site for a two-day fashion shoot featuring the supermodel Kate Moss. The project 'Flowers for Kate' involved Moss wearing seven different dresses over the course of two days, with Lumsden writing a poem for each one. The resulting video features Moss in silhouette wearing her favourite dress from the shoot whilst she reads the poem Lumsden wrote for that dress. He also wrote a diary of the event.

He did editing work on several prize-winning poetry collections and the Pilot series of pamphlets by poets under 30 for Tall Lighthouse. He was organiser and host of the monthly reading series BroadCast, held upstairs at the Poetry Society offices on Betterton Street, Covent Garden. Third Wish Wasted was published in 2009, poems from which were awarded the Bess Hokin Prize by the Poetry Foundation. The book was launched at the StAnza Poetry Festival in St Andrews on 21 March 2009, with a reading that was recorded by Bloodaxe Books and which is still available on YouTube.

Between 2010 and 2015, he was Poetry Editor for Salt Publishing, responsible for commissioning over thirty individual collections, and for whom he was also Series Editor of The Best British Poetry anthologies.

A sixth collection, Terrific Melancholy, was published in 2011, followed by Not All Honey in 2014. Of the latter, Laurie Donaldson in the Glasgow Review of Books noted Lumsden's invention of new poetic forms: kernel poems (e.g. 'The Bells of Hope'), the sevenling ("two sets of three line verses, finishing with a summary line that closes the poem off") and the hebdomad ("nine tercets that draw together separate details and thoughts over a certain time period, the conjunction of which is helped by the coincidences and serendipity of everyday life"). Of the collection as a whole, Donaldson suggests the inventive word-play shows the poems to be "more ludic than febrile [...] Inherent in all this is a musicality, reinforcing Lumsden’s belief that poetry should be read aloud." Melt and Solve quickly followed in 2015. Lumsden’s final collection, So Glad I’m Me, was published in 2017 and was shortlisted for the T. S. Eliot Prize. Reviewing the book, Alison Craig suggested: "This is poetry as an extreme sport, a whole world of shifting ideas with people – dead and alive – dropping in, whispering in your ear, or just walking right through, bold as brass." Of the book's central themes, she noted a number of poems "dealt with our essential one-ness, exploring whether it is possible to overcome the two-ness that we find in our lives, what it is to be 'me', how 'me' can be changed when memory jogs in, when places change and are not as we thought [...] More than this, though, is separation within the self, the difficulty of finding a constant self as time moves on and the people and places we think we knew – that helped form our identity – change, so that the self becomes divided across memory and time."

In the same way that Lumsden had adopted the St James Oyster Bar as his base in Edinburgh, in his later years he chose to base himself at the Betsey Trotwood bar in Clerkenwell. It became a hub for the group of poets who gathered around him, and he organised a number of events in the upstairs function room. Among his closest friends in these London years were the poets Amy Key and Camellia Stafford, and Key mentions this friendship in her book Arrangements in Blue: Notes on Love and Making a Life (Jonathan Cape, 2023).

Renowned for being an aficionado of quizzes and word puzzles, Lumsden worked as a puzzle and quiz writer and a popular reference compiler and editor, including a long stint writing daily word quizzes for the Scotsman newspaper. For several years, he wrote an Internet blog of self-researched trivia entitled 'Vitamin Q', which later was published in book form by the prestigious Edinburgh based publisher, Chambers. In 2014 he became a regular team member on Radio 4's long running show Round Britain Quiz, representing Scotland alongside crime writer Val McDermid. They won the 2014 series.

== Illness and death (2016-2020) ==
When talking about 'Roddy Lumsden Is Dead' in 2000, Lumsden stated that he had suffered from "the problem of depersonalisation, a distressing but exhilarating, rare mental disorder which I have suffered from at (thankfully very infrequent) intervals during my adult life".

He was diagnosed with acute liver cirrhosis in 2016. He moved into a care home in New Cross, London, close to where he lived for many years in Blackheath, and died there on 10 January 2020. His funeral was on 10 February 2020 at Honor Oak Crematorium, South London.

Tributes demonstrated just how influential he had been. A memorial page posted by The Poetry School included contributions from a range of poets he taught in their early years of development, including Daljit Nagra, Inua Ellams, Mark Waldron, Kayo Chingonyi, Rebecca Perry, Dai George, Rachael Allen, Jon Stone, and Fran Lock.

== Published works ==
=== Poetry collections ===
- Yeah Yeah Yeah (Bloodaxe, 1997)
- The Book of Love (Bloodaxe, 2000)
- Roddy Lumsden is Dead (Wrecking Ball Press, 2001)
- Mischief Night: New & Selected Poems (Bloodaxe, 2004)
- Third Wish Wasted (Bloodaxe, 2009)
- Terrific Melancholy (Bloodaxe, 2011)
- Not All Honey (Bloodaxe, 2014)
- Melt and Solve (Salt Publishing, 2015)
- So Glad I’m Me (Bloodaxe, 2017)

=== Pamphlets ===
- Elsewhere Perhaps Later (privately published, 1995)
- The Bubble Bride (St Andrews Bay, 2003)
- Super Try Again (Donut Press, 2007)
- The Bells of Hope (Penned in the Margins, 2012)

=== As editor ===
- The Message: crossing the tracks between poetry and pop (Poetry Society, 1999, co-ed with Stephen Troussé)
- Anvil New Poets 3 (Anvil Press, 2001, co-ed with Hamish Ironside)
- Identity Parade: new British & Irish poets (Bloodaxe, 2010)
- The Best British Poetry 2011 (Salt, 2011)
- The Salt Book of Younger Poets (Salt, 2011, with Eloise Stonborough)

=== Other ===
- Vitamin Q: a temple of trivia lists and curious words (Chambers, 2004)
- Every Boy's Book of Knowledge (Prion, 2007, compiler and editor)
- Chambers Gigglossary (Chambers, 2008, contributor)
