= Gérard Macé =

French poet and photographer

Gérard Macé (born Paris, 4 December 1946) is a French poet, essayist, translator and photographer. He published his first book Le jardin des langues in 1974 and since then has published nearly 50 books. His work is noted for its mixing of diverse genres. He has won many prizes including the Grand prix de poésie from the Academie Francaise for the entirety of his work.

His poetry has been published in English translation by Bloodaxe Books.
