= Leanne O'Sullivan =

Irish poet

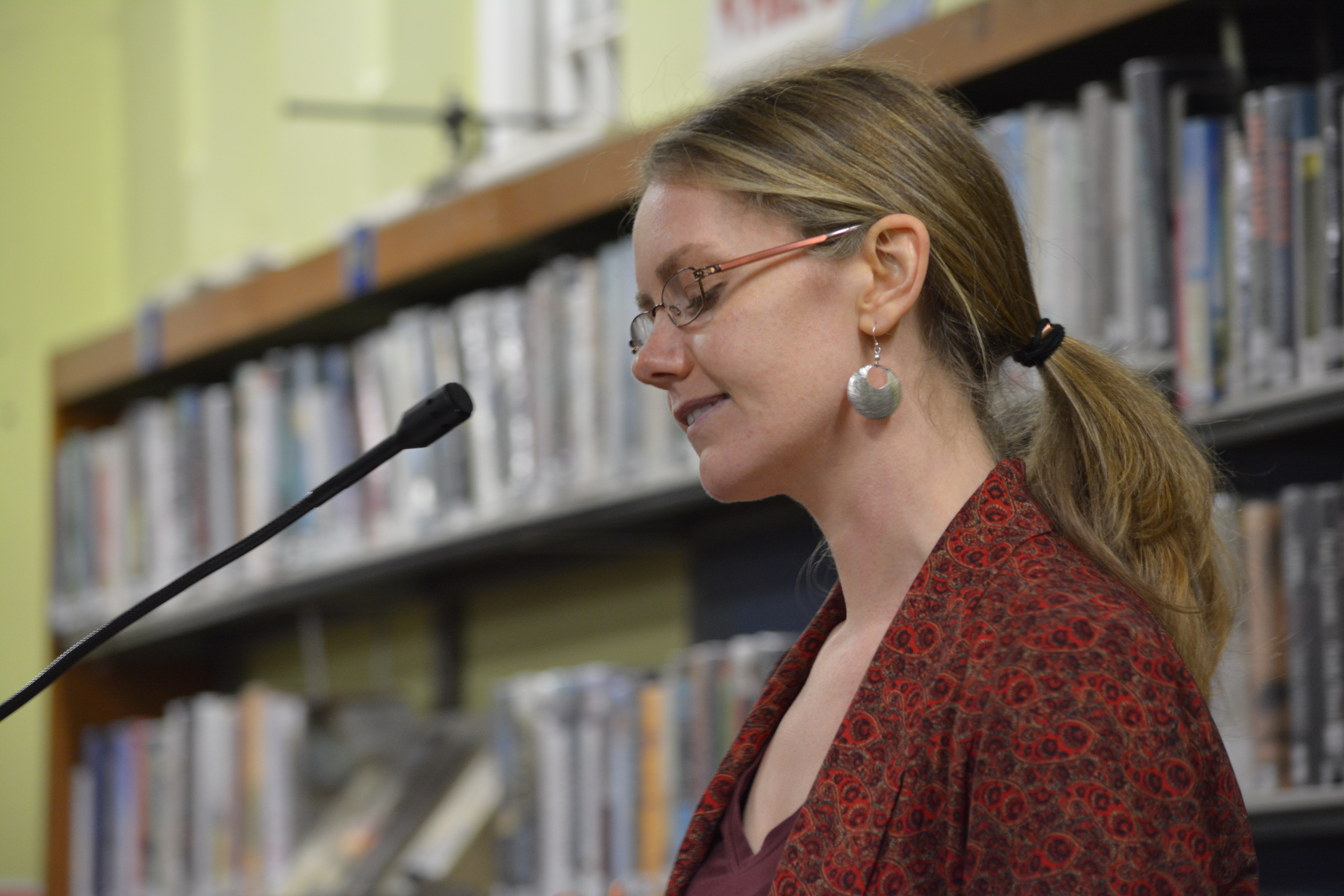
Leanne O'Sullivan reading at Cork City Library, April 2013

Leanne O'Sullivan is a poet from the Beara Peninsula in County Cork, Ireland. She is the author of three collections of poetry.

== Writing career ==
O'Sullivan's first collection of poetry, Waiting for my Clothes (2004), was published by Bloodaxe Books when she was 21 years old. She later published Cailleach: The Hag of Beara (2009) and The Mining Road (2013). She has won a range of Ireland's literary awards, including the Rooney Prize for Irish Literature in 2010, followed by the Lawrence O'Shaughnessy Award for Irish Poetry in 2011. In 2009, she was given the Ireland Chair of Poetry Bursary Award.

As an emerging poet, O'Sullivan won the RTÉ Rattlebag Poetry Slam and the Davoren Hanna Award for Young Emerging Irish Poet.

== Personal ==
O’Sullivan comes from the Beara Peninsula in West Cork. She studied English at University College Cork, from which she received an Alumni Award in 2012.
