= Pauline Stainer =

English poet

- Born: Pauline Anita Rogers; 5 March 1941 (age 84); Burslem, Stoke-on-Trent, England
- Education: St Anne's College, Oxford
- Occupation: Poet
- Years active: 1987–present
- Children: 4

Pauline Anita Stainer (née Rogers, born 5 March 1941) is an English poet. She was born Burslem, Stoke-on-Trent, Staffordshire. She left the city to study at St Anne's College, Oxford, where she took a degree in English. After Oxford she completed an MPhil degree at the University of Southampton.

== Biography ==
Her determinedly neo-romantic poetry explores sacred myth, legend, history-in-landscape, and human feeling—and their connections to the 'inner landscapes' of the imaginative mind. Her choice of subject matter is perhaps partly a reaction to her growing up in the industrial city of Stoke-on-Trent. The compact vividness of her visual imagery is akin to that of the Anglo Saxon riddles, Symbolist poetry, or the work of García Lorca. Reviewers have also detected the influence of Ted Hughes in her work.

She was awarded a Hawthornden Fellowship in 1987. She came to public notice with her first volume, The Honeycomb (1989). Her later volumes, Sighting the Slave Ship (1992) and The Ice-Pilot Speaks (1994) led up to her nomination and shortlisting in the Whitbread Poetry Award for her fourth collection The Wound-Dresser's Dream (1996).

Her poetry has won numerous prizes. In 2003 Bloodaxe Books published a summation of her work to date, The Lady and the Hare: New and Selected Poems, although this did not reproduce the illustrations that have accompanied some of her poems in book form.

After completing her education she moved to Essex, raising four children. She spent several years on the Orkney island of Rousay, from which came a new book collection Parable Island (1999). She recently lived in Hadleigh, Suffolk before moving back to Essex in late 2017.

She has collaborated with, and has been published by the Brotherhood of Ruralists, but is now published by the major poetry book publisher Bloodaxe Books. Her most recent works are Sleeping Under the Juniper Tree (2017) and The Silence of Sound Mirrors (2021), the latter included illustrations by Rosamund Ulph.

== Awards ==
- 1987 Hawthornden Fellowship Prize
- 1994 Poetry Book Society's New Generation Poet
- 2000 King's Lynn Award for Merit in Poetry
- 2009 Cholmondeley Award

== Bibliography ==
- The Honeycomb (1989)
- Little Egypt (1991)
- Sighting the Slave Ship (1992)
- Frequencies (1993)
- The Ice-Pilot Speaks (1994)
- The Wound-dresser's Dream (1996)
- Parable Island (1999)
- A Litany of High Waters (2002)
- The Lady and the Hare: New and Selected Poems (2003) ISBN 1-85224-632-4
- Crossing the Snowline (2008)
- Tiger Facing the Mist (2013)
- Sleeping Under the Juniper Tree (2017)
- The Silence of Sound Mirrors (2021)
