= David Scott (poet) =

English priest, poet and writer (1947–2022)

- Born: David Victor Scott; 13 January 1947; Cambridge, England
- Died: 21 October 2022 (aged 75); Kendal, Cumbria, England
- Education: Durham University; Cuddesdon College
- Occupations: Priest, poet, playwright, writer

David Victor Scott (13 January 1947 – 21 October 2022) was an English Anglican priest, poet, playwright and spiritual writer.

Scott was born in Cambridge, England. He was educated at Solihull School, then studied theology at Durham University and at Cuddesdon College. After ordination, he spent two years as curate at Harlow, then was appointed chaplain at Haberdashers' Aske's School. In 1980 he became vicar of Torpenhow and Allhallows in Cumbria. In 1991 he moved to Winchester to become rector of St Lawrence with St Swithun-upon-Kingsgate. He retired in September 2010 to Cumbria, where he died in Kendal.

Scott was an honorary canon of Winchester Cathedral and an honorary fellow of the University of Winchester. In 2008 the Archbishop of Canterbury conferred on him the Lambeth Degree Doctorate of Letters (DLitt).

== Poetical works ==
Much of Scott's poetry employs an engagingly subdued tone for its treatment of his clerical duties and events in the lives of his parishioners. He has also produced numerous impressively concise poems on literary and ecclesiastical figures; these include 'A Walk with St Teresa of Avila', notable for the interplay of a witty spiritual surrealism with his characteristically precise use of local detail.

— The Oxford Companion to Twentieth-Century Literature in English (ed. Jenny Stringer), entry Scott, David

- A Quiet Gathering (Bloodaxe Books, 1984) ISBN 0-906427-68-1, illustrated by Graham Arnold
- Playing for England (Bloodaxe Books, 1989) ISBN 1-85224-071-7, illustrated by Graham Arnold
- How Does It Feel? (Blackie Children's Books, 1989) ISBN 0-216-92656-4, illustrated by Alan Marks
- Selected Poems (Bloodaxe Books, 1998) ISBN 1-85224-426-7
- Piecing Together (Bloodaxe Books, 2005) ISBN 1-85224-696-0
- Beyond the Drift: New & Selected Poems (Bloodaxe Books, 2014) ISBN 1-78037-104-7

== Spiritual works ==
- Moments of Prayer (SPCK, 1997) ISBN 0-281-04987-4
- Building Common Faith (Canterbury Press, 1997) ISBN 1-85311-185-6
- An Anglo-Saxon Passion (SPCK, 1999) ISBN 0-281-05212-3
- Sacred Tongues: The Golden Age of Spiritual Writing (SPCK, 2001) ISBN 0-281-05221-2
- Lancelot Andrewes: The Private Prayers (SPCK, 2002) ISBN 0-281-05440-1
- The Mind of Christ (Continuum, 2006) ISBN 0-8264-9074-3

== Plays ==
(for the National Youth Music Theatre, with Jeremy James Taylor)

- Bendigo Boswell, first performed 1983 (Weinberger, 1984)
- Captain Stirrick, first performed 1981 (Weinberger, 1985)
- Jack Spratt VC, first performed 1986 (Weinberger, 1987)
- Les Petits Rats, first performed 1988 (Weinberger, 1991)
- The Powder Monkeys (SchoolPlay Productions, 1993) ISBN 1-872475-08-6
