= Jeni Couzyn =

South African poet

- Born: 1942 (age 83–84); South Africa
- Occupations: poet and anthologist
- Known for: Life by Drowning: Selected Poems

Jeni Couzyn (born 1942) is a feminist poet and anthologist of South African extraction who lives and works in Canada and the United Kingdom. Her best known collection is titled Life by Drowning: Selected Poems (1985), which includes an earlier sequence A Time to Be Born (1981) that chronicles her pregnancy and the birth of her daughter.

== Biography ==
Couzyn was born in South Africa and educated at the University of Natal. She emigrated to Britain in 1966 and established herself as a freelance writer. She became a Canadian citizen in 1975 and the following year was appointed writer-in-residence at the University of Victoria, British Columbia. Since then she has divided her time between England, Canada, and South Africa.

== Work ==
=== Poetry ===
Couzyn's first collection was titled Flying (1970). Later collections include Christmas in Africa (1975), A Time to be Born (1981), Life by Drowning: Selected poems (1985), and That's It (1993).

A Time to be Born deals with childbirth from "conception to birth and early infancy".

The Oxford Companion to Twentieth-Century Literature in English remarks that Couzyn's poetry repeatedly engages the social, political and imaginative implications of womanhood. Her poetry has been described as minimalist. The Oxford Companion observes that her conception of poetry as pre-eminently oral gives much of her work clarity and immediacy.

=== Anthologies ===
Couzyn edited the influential The Bloodaxe Book of Contemporary Women Poets (1985), set as an A-level text in British schools at the time. A later anthology, Singing Down the Bones (1989), was aimed at a teenage audience.

=== Other ===
Couzyn has authored two books for children. With Julie Malgas, she produced a study of Koos Malgas, the sculptor who helped create The Owl House, a museum in Nieu-Bethesda, Eastern Cape, South Africa, noted for its visionary conception.
