= Bloodaxe Books =

British publishing house specialising in poetry

- Founded: 1978
- Founder: Neil Astley
- Country of origin: United Kingdom
- Headquarters location: Hexham, Northumberland
- Distribution: Grantham Book Services (UK); Consortium (US)
- Publication types: Books
- Fiction genres: Poetry
- Official website: www.bloodaxebooks.com

Bloodaxe Books is a British publishing house specialising in poetry.

== History ==
Bloodaxe Books was founded in 1978 in Newcastle upon Tyne by Neil Astley, who is still editor and managing director. Bloodaxe moved its editorial office to Northumberland and its finance office to Bala, North Wales, in 1997.

In 2013 Astley deposited the Bloodaxe Books archive at Newcastle University's Robinson Library, Special Collections.

== Notable publications ==
- Bloodaxe Book of Contemporary Women Poets, edited by Jeni Couzyn, an anthology of women poets, 1985.
- Hinterland, edited by E. A. Markham, a Caribbean anthology, 1989.
- The New Poetry, edited by Michael Hulse, David Kennedy and David Morley, 1993.
- Bloodaxe Book of 20th Century Poetry from Britain and Ireland, edited by Edna Longley, an anthology of 60 poets, 2000.
- Strong Words: modern poets on modern poetry, edited by W. N. Herbert and Matthew Hollis. Essays on poetry by poets, 2000.
- Staying Alive: real poems for unreal times, edited by Neil Astley, 2010.

== Published authors ==
=== European poets ===
- Sappho
- Catullus
- Osip Mandelstam
- Federico García Lorca
- Anna Akhmatova
- Marina Tsvetaeva
- Edith Södergran
- Miroslav Holub
- Hans Magnus Enzensberger
- Piotr Sommer
- Marin Sorescu
- Tomas Tranströmer
- Miguel Hernández
- Attila József
- Ágnes Nemes Nagy
- Jaan Kaplinski
- Tua Forsström
- Pia Tafdrup
- Tomas Venclova

=== United States poets ===
- Elizabeth Alexander
- Sarah Arvio
- Dan Chiasson
- Carolyn Forché
- Tess Gallagher
- Deborah Garrison
- Jack Gilbert
- Ellen Hinsey
- Tony Hoagland
- Jane Hirshfield
- Jane Kenyon
- Galway Kinnell
- Denise Levertov
- Philip Levine
- Samuel Menashe
- W.S. Merwin
- Julie O'Callaghan
- Naomi Shihab Nye
- Mary Oliver
- Anne Rouse
- Eva Salzman
- Gjertrud Schnackenberg
- Anne Stevenson
- Ruth Stone,
- Brian Turner (American poet)
- Chase Twichell
- Fred Voss
- C. K. Williams
- C. D. Wright
- James Wright

=== French poets ===
- Yves Bonnefoy
- René Char
- Jacques Dupin
- Paul Éluard
- André Frénaud
- Guillevic
- Philippe Jaccottet
- Gérard Macé
- Henri Michaux
- Pierre Reverdy
- Paul Valéry

=== Irish poets ===
- Jane Clarke (poet)
- Harry Clifton
- Ailbhe Darcy
- Louis de Paor
- Miriam Gamble
- Kerry Hardie
- Rita Ann Higgins
- Brendan Kennelly
- Richard Murphy
- Frank Ormsby
- Caitríona O'Reilly
- Micheal O'Siadhail
- Leanne O'Sullivan
- Matthew Sweeney

=== British-Caribbean diaspora poets ===
- John Agard
- James Berry
- Kamau Brathwaite
- Jean "Binta" Breeze
- Martin Carter
- Fred D'Aguiar
- Linton Kwesi Johnson
- Grace Nichols
- Benjamin Zephaniah
- E. A. Markham's landmark Caribbean anthology Hinterland (1989)

=== South Asian poets ===
- Moniza Alvi
- Imtiaz Dharker
- Tishani Doshi
- Arun Kolatkar
- Amali Rodrigo
- Shazea Quraishi
- Arundhathi Subramaniam
- Jeet Thayil

=== Poets from elsewhere ===
- Maram al-Massri (Syria)
- Salah Stétié (Lebanon)
- Mahmoud Darwish (Palestine)
- Taha Muhammad Ali (Palestine)
- Jack Mapanje (Malawi)
- Li-Young Lee (Indonesia/USA)
- Aimé Césaire (Martinque)
- Evgeny Rein
- Tatiana Shcherbina
- Elena Shvarts (Russia)
- Tatiana Voltskaia (Russia)
- Yang Lian (China)
- Yi Sha (China)
- Kenji Miyazawa (Japan)
- Jennifer Maiden (Australia)
- Robert Adamson (Australia)
- Dorothy Hewett (Australia)
- Kevin Hart (Australia)
- Alden Nowlan (Canada)
- Priscila Uppal (Canada)

=== Poets whom Bloodaxe gave their first publication ===
- Simon Armitage
- David Constantine
- Ailbhe Darcy
- Nia Davies
- Peter Didsbury
- Katie Donovan
- Maura Dooley
- Ian Duhig
- Helen Dunmore
- Frieda Hughes
- Elizabeth Garrett
- W. N. Herbert
- Jackie Kay
- Stephen Knight
- Gwyneth Lewis
- Glyn Maxwell
- Sean O'Brien
- David Scott
- Jo Shapcott
- Pauline Stainer
- Paul Batchelor,
- Zoë Brigley
- Polly Clark
- Julia Copus
- Nick Drake,
- Jen Hadfield
- Choman Hardi (exiled from Kurdistan)
- Tracey Herd
- Matthew Hollis
- Joanne Limburg
- Roddy Lumsden
- Esther Morgan
- Helen Ivory
- Stephanie Norgate
- Caitríona O'Reilly
- Clare Shaw
- Leanne O'Sullivan
- Clare Pollard
- Sally Read
- Yvonne Reddick
- Sarah Wardle

=== British and Irish poets previously published by other imprints ===
- Gillian Allnutt
- Connie Bensley
- Stewart Conn
- Freda Downie
- Ruth Fainlight
- Andrew Greig
- Philip Gross
- Tony Harrison
- Selima Hill
- Frances Horovitz
- Kathleen Jamie
- Jenny Joseph
- Barry MacSweeney
- Adrian Mitchell
- Grace Nichols
- Mario Petrucci
- J.H. Prynne
- Peter Reading
- Lawrence Sail
- Ken Smith
- R. S. Thomas
- Susan Wicks
- Fleur Adcock
- Moniza Alvi
- Basil Bunting
- Roy Fisher
- Carole Satyamurti
- Penelope Shuttle
- Anne Stevenson
- George Szirtes

=== Poets from earlier periods ===
- John Oldham
- Rabindranath Tagore
- Kenji Miyazawa
- Edward Thomas
- Bernard Spencer

== New Generation Poets ==
The growth of Bloodaxe and other specialist poetry publishers coincided with the emergence of a new generation of British and Irish poets, mostly born in the 50s and early 60s, many first published by these imprints. Twenty of these writers were later tagged New Generation Poets in a promotion organised by the Poetry Society in 1994, but this particular grouping was artificial and should not be taken as a critical guide, for it excluded several key figures from that generation, including Jackie Kay, Ian McMillan, Sean O'Brien, Jo Shapcott and Matthew Sweeney. The first anthology to represent this new generation was Bloodaxe's The New Poetry (1993), edited by Michael Hulse, David Kennedy and David Morley, which became a school set text. Sean O'Brien’s The Deregulated Muse: Essays on Contemporary British & Irish Poetry (Bloodaxe Books, 1998) is his account of poetry in the post-war period, from the generation of Philip Larkin and Ted Hughes to the new poets of the 80s and 90s.

== Women poets ==
One of Bloodaxe’s most significant achievements has been to transform the publishing opportunities for women poets. For many years Bloodaxe has been unusual in having a poetry list which is 50:50 male: female, not the result of positive discrimination but rather in relation to literary excellence. The first of several influential Bloodaxe anthologies of women poets, Jeni Couzyn’s Bloodaxe Book of Contemporary Women Poets (1985) was published at a time when very little poetry by women was readily available to readers. Others have included Carol Rumens’s New Women Poets (1990), Linda France’s Sixty Women Poets (1993), Maura Dooley’s Making for Planet Alice (1997), Robyn Bolam's Eliza's Babes: four centuries of women's poetry in English (2005), and Deryn Rees-Jones’s Modern Women Poets (2005), published as the companion anthology to her critical study Consorting with Angels (2005).

== Wider notoriety ==
Many other writers and books published by Bloodaxe have hit the headlines, arousing controversy and debate outside the poetry world. Tom Paulin’s essay collection Ireland & the English Crisis (1984) was savagely attacked by Enoch Powell for its political stance. Another cause célèbre was provided by Tony Harrison’s v. (1985), his book-length poem set in a vandalised cemetery in Leeds during the UK Miners’ Strike which captured the angry, desolate mood of Britain in the mid-1980s.

Two years after its publication, Richard Eyre’s film of the poem sparked a national furore, not over Harrison’s politics but over his skinhead protagonist’s use of ‘bad language’. The poem was attacked by Mary Whitehouse ("this work of singular nastiness") and by Tory MPs wanting Channel 4's broadcast to be stopped. The second edition of v. (1989) documents the media reaction to the film.

== Awards ==
Neil Astley was awarded an honorary DLitt by Newcastle University in 1995 for his work with Bloodaxe Books.

In 2000 Bloodaxe received funding from the Millennium Festival and the National Lottery through Arts Council England for an educational initiative to build a stronger awareness of 20th century poetry. This involved the publication of the literary critic Edna Longley's Bloodaxe Book of 20th Century Poetry from Britain and Ireland and Strong Words: modern poets on modern poetry.

== Other activities ==
In 2001 Jo Shapcott gave the first of the Newcastle/Bloodaxe poetry lectures at Newcastle University. Several other poets have since spoken about the craft and practice of poetry to audiences drawn from both the city and the university, with ten of these public lectures published in book form in the Newcastle/Bloodaxe Poetry Lectures series. Other books series published by Bloodaxe have included Bloodaxe Contemporary French Poets, Bloodaxe Poetry Handbooks, Bloodaxe Poetry Introductions and Bloodaxe World Poets.

Other initiatives to introduce contemporary poetry to new readers have included working with reading groups in Nottingham and in libraries across the West Midlands.

In Birmingham, Jonathan Davidson's team at Book Communications have produced three touring theatre shows which have taken live poetry performances to venues across Britain. Themes have included Staying Alive; Being Alive; and Changing Lives, which was a theatre piece using poems from books published by Bloodaxe over the previous 30 years.

== DVD-books ==
In 2008, Bloodaxe celebrated its 30th birthday by publishing what it believed to be the world's first poetry DVD-book, In Person: 30 Poets. In Person was filmed by the film-maker Pamela Robertson-Pearce and edited by Bloodaxe's founding editor, Neil Astley. It features six hours of readings on two DVDs by 30 poets, together with an anthology which includes all the poems read in the films.

Bloodaxe's digital initiative has continued with further DVD-books featuring work by the poets John Agard and Samuel Menashe with films by Pamela Robertson-Pearce, as well as books published with audio CDs by Sarah Arvio, Jackie Kay and Galway Kinnell, and a new edition of Briggflatts by Basil Bunting featuring an audio CD of the work read by the author, and a DVD with a film portrait of Bunting made by Peter Bell in 1982.
