= Esther Morgan (poet) =

British poet (born 1970)

- Born: 1970 (age 55–56); Kidderminster, England
- Education: University of East Anglia
- Occupation: Poet
- Writing career
- Language: English
- Notable awards: Eric Gregory Award (1998)
- Website: www.esthermorgan.net

Esther E. Morgan (born 1970) is a British poet.

She graduated with an MA in creative writing from the University of East Anglia in 1998. She has published four collections of poetry and won an Eric Gregory Award in 1998. Her first collection was Beyond Calling Distance (2001). It won the Jerwood Aldeburgh First Collection Prize and was shortlisted for the John Llewellyn Rhys Prize. Her second collection, The Silence Living in Houses, was published in 2005. Grace (2011) was a Poetry Book Society Recommendation and was shortlisted for the 2012 T. S. Eliot Prize. It includes the poem This Morning which won the 2010 Bridport Poetry Prize. Her fourth collection The Wound Register was published in 2018. She has taught creative writing at the University of East Anglia and at Edith Cowan University.

== Awards ==
- 1998 Eric Gregory Award
- 2010 Bridport Poetry Prize for This Morning

== Bibliography ==
=== Poetry collections ===
- Beyond Calling Distance. Bloodaxe Books. 2001. ISBN 9781852245702.
- The Silence Living in Houses. Bloodaxe Books. 2005. ISBN 9781852247119.
- Grace. Bloodaxe Books. 2011. ISBN 9781852249182.
- The Wound Register. Bloodaxe Books. 2018. ISBN 9781780374109.

=== Recordings ===
- The Poetry Archive - Esther Morgan
- Esther Morgan recorded by Neil Astley (2012)
