= Freda Downie =

English poet (1929–1993)

- Born: 20 October 1929; London, England
- Died: 4 May 1993 (aged 63)
- Occupation: Poet

Freda Downie (20 October 1929 – 4 May 1993) was an English poet.

== Early life ==
Downie was born in London on 20 October 1929, growing up in the outskirts of Shooters Hill. The family were evacuated to Northamptonshire at the start of World War II in September 1939. They returned to London during the Blitz, travelled by sea around Africa to Australia for her father's work in 1941–42. In 1944, the family returned across the Pacific to London at the time of V-1 and V-2 rockets. As an adult, Downie worked for music publishers and art agents.

== Writing ==
Downie only started publishing her poetry in the 1970s, and much of her work was published by small presses including Mandeville and Priapus. Her two main published collections were A Stranger Here (1977) and Plainsong (1981). Her Collected Poems, edited by George Szirtes, were published in 2023, after her death. Downie described her wartime memories in her memoir There'll Always Be an England: a poet's childhood, 1929–1945, written in the last year of her life and published in 2003.

Downie's poems have been described as "elegant, full of gently spiked irony, and oblique, wistful glances at everyday events and familiar landscapes". Geoffrey Grigson described A Stranger Here as "a better book of new poetry than any I have seen for years". Her obituarist in The Independent said that:

Downie's poetry could be deceptively gentle, concealing a sinewy preciseness of language and a sharply observant eye which offered the reader a quizzically oblique angle of vision. Yet, oblique as it was, it was always steady and uncompromising.

She won the Stroud Festival poetry competition in 1970, and an Arts Council Poetry Prize in 1977 for her A Stranger Here.

== Personal life ==
Downie married David Turner in 1957, and died at Berkhamsted on 4 May 1993.

== Selected publications ==
- A Stranger Here (1977, Secker, ISBN 0436132508)
- Plainsong (1981, Secker, ISBN 0436132516)
- Collected Poems, edited by George Szirtes (2003, Bloodaxe, ISBN 9781852243012)
- There'll Always Be an England: a poet's childhood, 1929–1945, (2003, Bloodaxe, ISBN 9781852244767)
