= Deborah Randall =

British poet (born 1957)

Deborah Randall (born 1957) is a British poet. Randall started writing in 1986, and in 1988 she won the first (and only) Bloodaxe National Poetry Competition. Her debut poetry collection, The Sin Eater (1989) was a Poetry Book Society Recommendation, and won a Scottish Arts Council Book Award. Her second collection, White Eyes Dark Ages (1993), was a portrait in verse of John Ruskin.

Randall was born in 1957 in Gosport, Hampshire. She worked in various places – including a plastics factory, hotels and a children's home – before studying English at Sheffield University. She moved to live in Kirkwall in Orkney, and later Ullapool in Scotland.

== Works ==
- The Sin Eater. Newcastle upon Tyne : Bloodaxe, 1989.
- White Eyes Dark Ages. Newcastle upon Tyne : Bloodaxe, 1993.
