= Robyn Bolam =

English poet

- Born: 20 October 1953 (age 72); Newcastle upon Tyne, England
- Other names: Marion Lomax
- Occupations: Poet, editor, librettist

Robyn Bolam (born 1953), formerly known as Marion Lomax, is an English poet, editor, and librettist. She writes about topics such as love and loss, about surviving under difficult situations, and about changes within the natural world and in society.

== Life and works ==
Robyn Bolam was born on 20 October 1953 in Newcastle upon Tyne, England. Her father, Charles Hall, was a carpenter and her mother, Margaret Ann Bolam, was a nurse. She spent most of her early life in Northumberland, England and began her poetry writing at a very young age. At the age of 15, one of her poems was first published in an anthology titled Next Wave Poets 1, and more of her poems were later published in Next Wave Poets 2.

Bolam married Michael Lomax in August 1974 and began publishing her works under the name Marion Lomax. Sometime after her marriage, she wrote a poem called 'Special Delivery', which was about the death of her father. The poem was accepted for the magazine New Poetry, published by Norman Hidden. Hidden encouraged Bolam until his death in 2006 at the age of 93. Another source of encouragement for Bolam was the poet Peter Porter, who encouraged her to apply for the Eric Gregory Award, for which she applied in 1980, and for which she was awarded in 1981. In the same year, she also won first prize in the Cheltenham Poetry Competition. In 1993, she was awarded a Hawthornden Castle Fellowship, and spent a month at the retreat for writers in Hawthornden Castle.

Robyn's first book, The Peepshow Girl, was published in 1989 by Bloodaxe Books, followed by Raiding the Borders in 1996, and New Wings in 2007. Her most recent publish work is Hyem, published in October 2017. She did not begin publishing under the name of Robyn Bolam until December 2000 after her divorce from Michael Lomax in December 1999.

== Awards ==
- 1981: Eric Gregory Award
- 1981: First Prize in Cheltenham Poetry Competition
- 1993: Hawthornden International Fellowship

== Books ==
- Stage Images and Traditions: Shakespeare to Ford (1987, as Marion Lomax)
- The Peepshow Girl (1989)
- Raiding the Borders (1996)
- Plotting Early Modern London: New Essays on Jacobean City Comedy (2004, contributor)
- New Wings (2007)
- Hyem (2017)
