= Art agent =

Talent agent for visual artists

An art agent or artist's agent is an agent who represents visual artists. They are also commonly referred to as a "rep" (short for "representation"), and are similar to talent agents in their business model and function. The agent many be an individual or an 'agency' with multiple agents. The agent functions as a business intermediary to sell the works of an artist, or to otherwise find and negotiate opportunities for the artist. The two parties have a contract worked out, where the agent takes a percentage of sales from any and all works, which may vary, depending on the relationship. Typically the range for a successful non-gallery sale is between 15% and 35% to the agent of the final sales price when the agent is responsible for bringing a buyer. Arts sales made at a Gallery are often split 50/50 between the artist or Trust and the Gallery.

Most full time working Illustrators are painters or designers who are represented by art agents. (See Society of Illustrators.)

Except in exceptional situations with high profile artists, an art agent may represent numerous artists simultaneously - sometimes 100 or more per agent or agent firm. Agents often develop relationships with buyers who regularly purchase art, such as book publishing companies and advertising agencies. It is in the art agent's best interests to sell the works of the artist. The relationship can benefit both the artist and the agent.

Many professional buyers will only work with an art agent since they can be expected to already understand the business, pricing, and contract negotiation.

Many unrecognized artists, no matter how talented, may find it hard to find an art agent willing to represent them. Art agents select their artist not based on their talent but the likelihood their works will sell.
