= Jen Hadfield =

Scottish poet and artist (born 1978)

Jen Hadfield FRSL
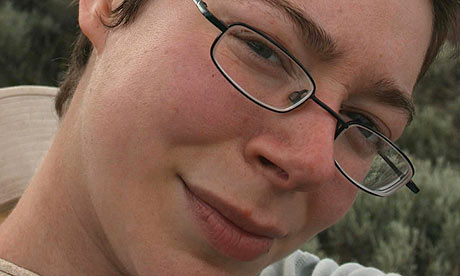
- Hadfield in 2007
- Born: 1978 (age 47–48); Cheshire, England
- Education: University of Edinburgh; University of Glasgow
- Occupations: Poet, visual artist, teacher
- Writing career
- Notable works: Nigh-No-Place, Almanacs
- Notable awards: T. S. Eliot Prize; Eric Gregory Award; Windham-Campbell

Jen Hadfield (born 1978) is a British poet and visual artist. She has published four poetry collections. She won an Eric Gregory Award in 2003. Hadfield is the youngest female poet to be awarded the T. S. Eliot Prize, with her second collection, Nigh-No-Place, in 2008. Her fourth collection, The Stone Age, was selected as the Poetry Book Society choice for spring 2021 and won the Highland Book Prize, 2021. In 2024, she was awarded a Windham-Campbell prize.

Hadfield's poems and visual art are based on her experience of living, working and traveling in Shetland and the Outer Hebrides of Scotland, and Canada. In her work as an artist, she often uses found objects, salvage materials and ocean detritus.

Themes in Hadfield's poems include home and belonging, wildness and subsistence, landscape and language, and the Shetland dialect.

== Biography ==
Jen Hadfield was born in 1978 to a Canadian mother and a British father. She grew up in Cheshire, England. She obtained a BA in English Language and Literature from the University of Edinburgh. Later, she was awarded a joint creative writing MLitt (with Distinction) from the Universities of Glasgow and Strathclyde.

Hadfield has been a professional poet since 2002. In 2003, she won the Eric Gregory Award, which enabled a year of travel and writing in Canada. Her first collection, Almanacs (Bloodaxe Books, 2005) was written in Shetland and the Western Isles in 2002, thanks to a bursary from the Scottish Arts Council. Her second collection, Nigh–No–Place (Bloodaxe Books, 2008), inspired by her travels in Shetland and Canada, was awarded the T. S. Eliot Prize in 2008. Hadfield was winner of the Edwin Morgan International Poetry Award in 2012. and selected in 2014 as one of "Next Generation Poets", a promotion organised by the Poetry Book Society. Her fourth collection, The Stone Age, won the Highland Book Prize in 2021. Other honours include the Scottish Arts Council Bursary Award, and residencies with the Shetland Arts Trust and the Scottish Poetry Library.

Making artists' books is part of Hadfield's work. She collaborated with printer Ursula Freeman of Redlake Press on The Printer’s Devil and the Little Bear (2006), a limited edition handmade book that combined traditional letterpress techniques and laserprint. The book is illustrated with Hadfield's photographs of Canada.

In 2007, a Dewar Award enabled Hadfield to travel in Mexico and research Mexican devotional folk art. She "created a solo exhibition of 'Shetland ex-votos in the style of sacred Mexican folk art' – tiny, portable, insistently familiar landscapes packed in an array of weathered tobacco tins."

She was elected a Fellow of the Royal Society of Literature in 2021.

Hadfield lives on Burra in Shetland, where she works as a poet and writing tutor. She has a partner and a child.

Hadfield has said "We live in painful times, in a difficult world, and yet the world is still overwhelmingly magical. Poetry gives us a chance to stop, reflect, process, cope, grieve and revere".

== Bibliography ==
=== Poetry collections ===
- Almanacs (Bloodaxe Books, 2005)
- Nigh–No–Place (Bloodaxe Books, 2008)
- Byssus (Picador, 2014)
- The Stone Age (Picador, 2021)

=== Biographies ===
- Storm Pegs: A Life Made in Shetland (Picador, 2024)
