= Anne Rouse =

American-British poet (born 1954)

Anne Barrett Rouse
- Born: September 26, 1954 (age 71)
- Occupation: Poet

Anne Barrett Rouse (born September 26, 1954) is an American-British poet. She has been cited as a noted American-British contributor to contemporary British poetry.

== Biography ==
She was born in Washington, D.C., grew up in Virginia and read history at the University of London. Afterwards, she worked as a nurse and as the director of the mental health charity Islington Mind. Now a freelance writer, she has had numerous residencies, including fellowships at the University of Glasgow and the Courtauld Institute of Art.

Rouse has been described by the International Poetry Society as an "accomplished and intelligent writer" and by Don Paterson and Charles Simic in their anthology New British Poetry as a poet of "great formal deftness", with a fine gift for social themes incorporated into her poetry. Rouse, in her earlier works, often draws upon her experiences as a nurse and mental health worker. Her poems often fuse together the ordinary and the bizarre, often with use of satire and humour.

All four of her collections to date have been published by Bloodaxe Books, including Sunset Grill (1993) and Timing (1997), both of which were Poetry Book Society Recommendations. A number of her poems have appeared in anthologies, such as New British Poetry (2004). Several of the poems in Timing were written as performances pieces, such as "Spunk Talking," and many of them have been described as being "hymns to the momentary and the marvelously futile: physical love, football, the preoccupations of patients on a dementia ward, fashion, and poetry itself." Her poem "Glass" was published in The Guardian and she has also had work published in the London Review of Books, The Independent, Atlantic Monthly and The Times Literary Supplement.

Rouse has performed her poetry at Arvon Foundation, the South Bank, Aldeburgh Poetry Festival and Almeida Theatre. In 2004 she recorded her poems "Childminding," "The Anaesthetist," "Sighting," and "Testament" for the British Council.

In 2008, Rouse published a poetry collection, entitled The Upshot: New and Selected Poems. This included the poem sequence "The Divided," which has been described as constructing "a modern meta-physic out of love and the daily, set against the latent (sometimes tragic) divisions in contemporary society."

Rouse has also collaborated with the composer Morgan Hayes, the artist Emily Johns, and the artist and graphic designer Erica Smith.

== Personal life ==
Rouse was formerly a fellow of the Royal Literary Fund. She currently lives in East Sussex.

== Poetry collections ==
- Sunset Grill (1993)
- Timing (1997)
- The School of Night (2004)
- The Upshot: New and Selected Poems (2008)
- Ox-Eye (2022)
