= Sarah Arvio =

American poet, essayist and translator

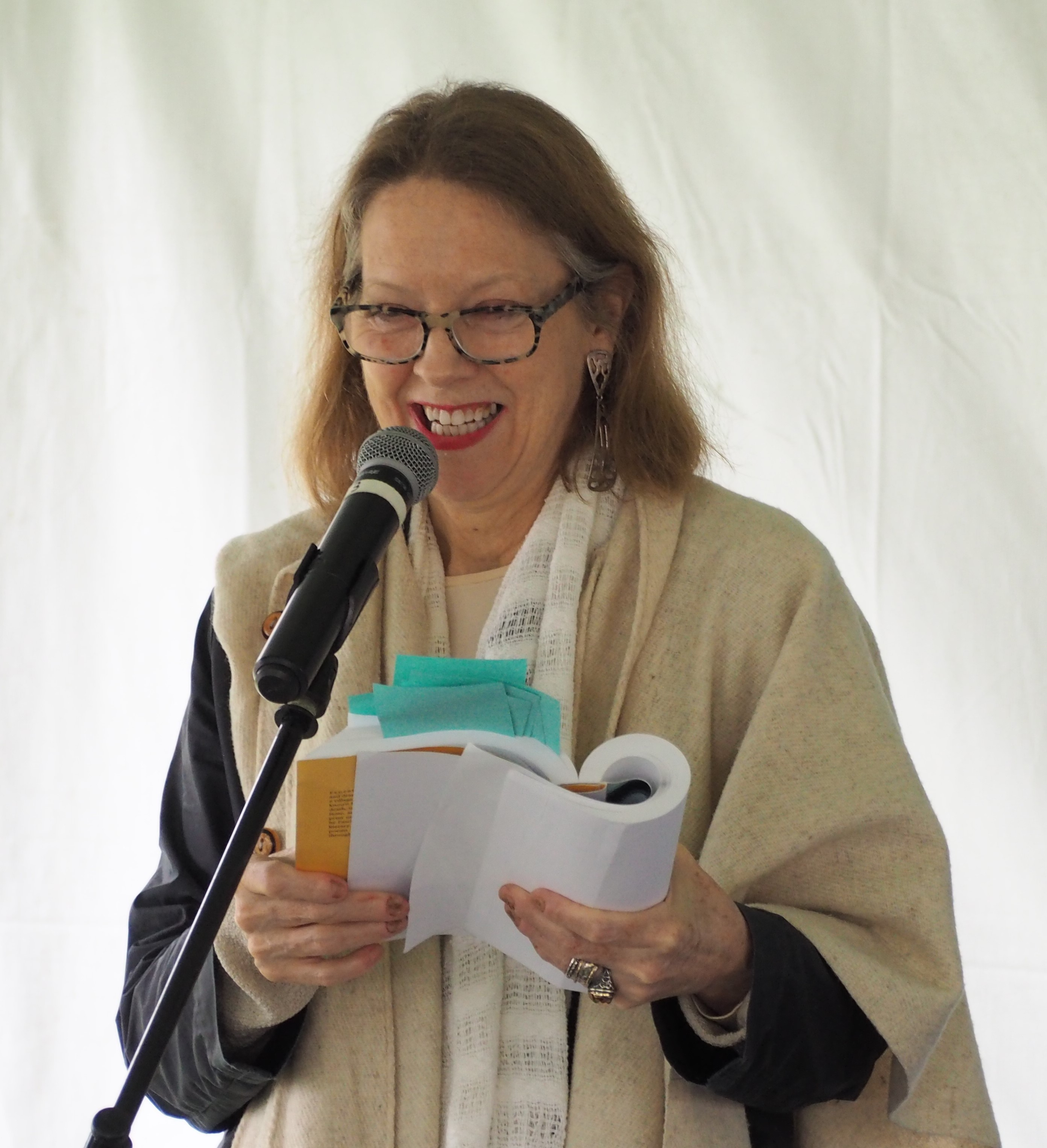
- Arvio in 2018
- Born: April 3, 1954 (age 72)
- Writing career
- Genre: Poetry
- Notable awards: Rome Prize, Guggenheim Fellowship

Sarah Arvio (born April 3, 1954) is an American poet, essayist and translator.

She is the author of Visits from the Seventh, Sono: cantos, and night thoughts: 70 dream poems & notes from an analysis.

She has won the Rome Prize in Literature from the American Academy of Arts and Letters, a Guggenheim Fellowship, a Bogliasco fellowship, a National Endowment for the Arts Translation Fellowship, and other honors.

== Life ==
Arvio has lived in Caracas, Mexico City, Paris, Rome and New York. She works as a translator for the United Nations in New York and Switzerland; she has also taught poetry at Princeton University.

== Career ==
Arvio has been widely published in journals and magazines. Her work has also appeared in many anthologies, including The Best American Poetry 2015, The Best American Poetry 1998, The Best American Erotic Poetry, Women's Work, the FSG Book of 20th Century Italian Poetry, the Oxford Book of Latin American Short Stories, and Ariadne's Thread: A Collection of Contemporary Women's Journals.

The poet and philosopher John Koethe, in his citation for Arvio's Boston Review prize, said:

The idea of the distinctive poetic voice…seems central to Sarah Arvio’s poetry, which sounds like no one else’s. Yet the voice in her poems seems to emanate from a kind of psychic doppelganger, originating from an imagined self somewhere outside her and passing through her on the way to the reader. It writes the self from which it issues, rather than the other way around, and is constructed out of wordplay and verbal associations… The results are poems that possess both an eerie psychological presence and a blunt verbal materiality.

Her poems have been set to music. William Bolcom set “Chagrin” for mezzo-soprano and chamber ensemble in a song cycle entitled "The Hawthorn Tree” (which also adapts poems by Louise Bogan, Willa Cather, Anne Carson, Stevie Smith and Elinor Wylie). Steven Burke set “Armor” in a monodrama entitled “Skin,” for mezzo-soprano and cello. Miriama Young composed “Côte d’Azur” as "Inner Voices of Blue", first for tenor and chamber ensemble and later resetting it for mezzo-soprano.

She was the translator and poetry editor for the film Azul: Land of Poets (1988), directed by Roland Legiardi-Laura. She also worked as a research associate for the landmark film series on American poets, Voices & Visions, which aired on PBS in 1988.

== Awards and honors ==
- 1992: National Endowment for the Arts Translation Fellowship
- 1997: Paris Review's B.F. Connors (long poem) Prize
- 1999: Poetry's Frederick Bock Prize
- 2003-2004: Rome Prize
- 2005-2006: Guggenheim Fellowship
- 2008: Boston Review Annual Poetry Contest
- 2012: Bogliasco Fellowship

== Books ==
- Visits from the Seventh, New York : Alfred A. Knopf, 2002. ISBN 9780375413674, OCLC 634762552
- Sono: Cantos, New York, N.Y: Knopf, 2006. ISBN 9780307263230, OCLC 637348196
- Sono : with Visits from the seventh, Northumberland: Bloodaxe Books, 2009. ISBN 9781852248444, OCLC 430930631
- Night thoughts: 70 dream poems & notes from an analysis, New York: Knopf, 2014. 2013 ISBN 9780375712227, OCLC 883425228

Translation

- Federico García Lorca, Poet in Spain New York : Alfred A. Knopf, 2017. ISBN 9781524733117, OCLC 973518459
