= David Morley (poet) =

British poet, professor, and ecologist

- Occupations: Poet, editor, academic
- Writing career
- Period: 1989 – present

David Morley FRSL is a British poet, professor, and ecologist. His best-selling textbook The Cambridge Introduction to Creative Writing has been translated into many languages. His major poetry collections include FURY, Scientific Papers, The Invisible Kings, Enchantment, The Gypsy and the Poet, and The Magic of What's There are published by Carcanet Press. The Invisible Gift: Selected Poems was published by Carcanet and won The Ted Hughes Award for New Work in Poetry. He was awarded a Cholmondeley Award by the Society of Authors for his body of work and contribution to poetry. He is a Fellow of The Royal Society of Literature. FURY published in August 2020 was a Poetry Book Society Choice and shortlisted for the Forward Prize for Best Collection. Passion was published by Carcanet Press in 2025.

== Biography ==
Morley read Zoology at Bristol University, gaining a fellowship from the Freshwater Biological Association. He then conducted research on acid rain. Before his appointment as a Fellow at Warwick University, David Morley directed the National Association of Writers in Education. He was elected deputy chair of The Poetry Society (UK) and co-founded The Poetry Cafe in Covent Garden. He co-edited a bestselling anthology The New Poetry for Bloodaxe Books (1993) and edited the British and Irish poetry list for Arc Publications for ten years. Morley became Literature Officer for Kirklees in Yorkshire, directing the 1995 World Poetry Festival and 1995 Small Press Festival.

In 1996 he was appointed Arts Council Fellow in Writing at the University of Warwick. He began The Warwick Writing Programme with Jeremy Treglown and served as its Director for 18 years. The University of Warwick awarded him a personal Chair in 2007, and a D.Litt in 2008. He was elected a Fellow of The English Association in 2012.

Morley has received a number of literary awards including the 2015 Ted Hughes Award for New Poetry, a Cholmondeley Award, a major Eric Gregory Award, the Tyrone Guthrie Award, a Hawthornden International Writers Fellowship, an Arts Council Writers Award, the Raymond Williams Prize, an Arts Council Fellowship in Writing at Warwick University. He has also received two awards for his teaching, including a National Teaching Fellowship. He has been a guest on a number of BBC broadcast programmes including Front Row, The Verb, Open Book and The Late Show, as well as cultural programmes in the US, Canada, and Australia. His collections of poetry The Invisible Kings and The Gypsy and the Poet were Poetry Book Society Recommendations; and FURY a Poetry Book Society Choice.

Morley created and presented the internationally popular Writing Challenges podcasts. He has written criticism, essays and reviews for newspapers and magazines including The Independent, The Guardian, The Poetry Review and The Times Higher Education Supplement. He was a judge of the 2012 T. S. Eliot Prize, the 2013 Foyle Young Poets Prize, and chair of judges of the 2026 Laurel Prize. Morley was Head of the Department of English and Comparative Literary Studies at Warwick University and Professor. He held the role of Alliance Chair of Writing at Monash University, Melbourne. In 2018 he was elected a Fellow of The Royal Society of Literature. He created the YouTube/Tiktok series The Life of Words in 2026.

== Bibliography ==
=== Poetry collections ===
- 1989: Releasing Stone (Nanholme)
- 1991: A Belfast Kiss (The Poetry Business)
- 1993: Mandelstam Variations (Arc Publications)
- 1994: A Static Ballroom (Scratch)
- 1998: Clearing a Name (Arc Publications)
- 2002: Scientific Papers (Carcanet)
- 2002: Of Science (with Andy Brown) (Worple)
- 2003: Ludus Coventriae (Prest Roots)
- 2007: The Invisible Kings (Carcanet)
- 2009: The Night of the Day (Nine Arches)
- 2009: The Rose of the Moon (Templar)
- 2010: Enchantment (Carcanet)
- 2013: The Gypsy and the Poet (Carcanet)
- 2015: The Invisible Gift: Selected Poems (Carcanet)
- 2016: The Death of Wisdom Smith, Prince of Gypsies (The Melos Press)
- 2017: The Magic of What's There (Carcanet)
- 2020: FURY (Carcanet)
- 2025: Passion (Carcanet)

=== Non-fiction ===
- 1992: Under the Rainbow: Writers and Artists in Schools (Bloodaxe)
- 2007: The Cambridge introduction to Creative Writing (Cambridge University Press)
- 2012: The Cambridge Companion to Creative Writing (co-ed. Cambridge University Press)

=== Editor ===
- 1990: Northern Stories 2 (with Philip Callow and Maura Dooley) (Littlewood)
- 1993: The New Poetry (with Michael Hulse and David Kennedy) (Bloodaxe)
- 2003: The Gift (Stride)
- 2004: Phoenix New Writing (Heaventree)
- 2007: No Longer Poetry: New Romanian Poetry (with Leonard Aldea) (Heaventree)
- 2007: Collected Poems of Geoffrey Holloway (Arrowhead)
- 2007: The Greatest Gift (NAGTY)
- 2009: Dove Release: New Flights and Voices (Worple Press)
- 2011: The Voyage: Adventures in Creative Writing (co-ed., Silkworms)
- 2018: Swimming Chenango Lake: Selected Poems of Charles Tomlinson (Carcanet Press)
