= Carole Satyamurti =

British poet, sociologist, and translator (1939–2019)

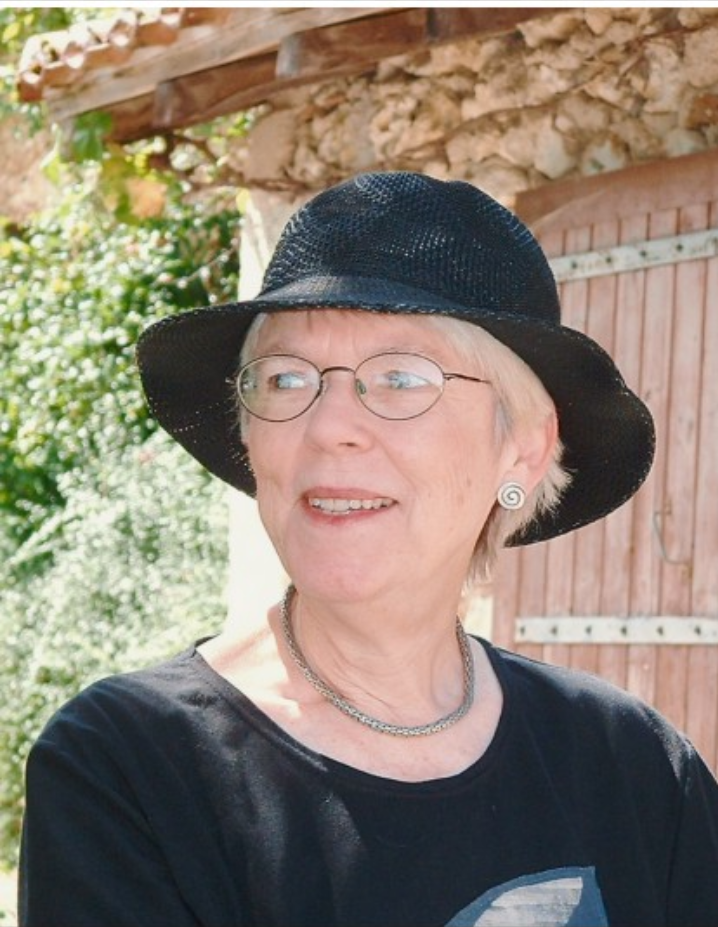
Carole Satyamurti in 2017

Carole Lavinia Satyamurti (or Sathyamurthy; née Methven; 13 August 1939 – 13 August 2019) was a British poet, sociologist, and translator.

== Personal life ==
Satyamurti grew up in Kent, and lived in North America, Singapore and Uganda. She attended the University of London (BA, 1960; PhD, 1979), the University of Birmingham (postgraduate diploma in social work 1965), and the University of Illinois Urbana-Champaign (MA 1967). She married T. V. Sathyamurthy, who taught politics at York University, in 1963, and they divorced in 1986; they had one daughter. She lived in London until her death on 13 August 2019, aged 80.

== Career ==
She taught at the University of East London and at the Tavistock Clinic, where her main interest was relating psychoanalytic ideas to the stories people tell about themselves, whether in formal autobiography or everyday encounters.

She was a writer in residence at the University of Sussex and the College of Charleston. She taught for the Arvon Foundation and for the Poetry School. She was vice-president of Ver Poets, a group of writers and poetry lovers based in St Albans. She ran poetry programmes in Venice, Corfu and the National Gallery in London, with Gregory Warren Wilson.

== Awards ==
Satyamurti won many awards including:

- 1986 National Poetry Competition
- 1988 and 2008 Arts Council Writers' Award
- 2000 Cholmondeley Award
- 2007 short-listed Forward Prize
- 2015 Roehampton Poetry Prize

== Works ==
- "Chesil Beach", poetry pf
- "Lust in Translation"; "How I Altered History"; "Woman Pursued by Dragon Flees into the Desert"; "Dear Departed", poetry pf
- "Villanelle", Ambit, No 165 2001
- "When He is Silent", Ambit, No 165 2001
- Broken Moon. Oxford University Press. 1987. ISBN 978-0-19-282097-6.
- Changing the Subject. Oxford University Press. 1990. ISBN 978-0-19-282738-8.
- Striking Distance. Oxford University Press. 1994. ISBN 978-1-85224-692-1.
- Selected Poems. Oxford University Press. 1998. ISBN 978-0-19-288101-4.
- Love and Variations. Bloodaxe Books. 2000. ISBN 978-1-85224-526-9.
- Stitching the Dark: New and Selected Poems. Bloodaxe Books. 2005. ISBN 978-1-85224-692-1.
- Countdown. Bloodaxe Books. 2011. ISBN 978-1-85224-912-0.
- Mahabharata: A Modern Retelling. W. W. Norton & Company, Inc. 2015. ISBN 978-0-393-08175-6

=== Translations ===
- "Two Women", Toeti Heraty, Poetry Translation Centre
- "A Woman's Portrait 1938", Toeti Heraty, Poetry Translation Centre
- "Geneva in July", Toeti Heraty, Poetry Translation Centre
- "Jogging in Jakarta", Toeti Heraty, Poetry Translation Centre
- from The Mahabharata, The Poetry Society

=== Anthologies ===
- Carol Ann Duffy, ed. (1997). "Piccadilly Line". I Wouldn't Thank You for a Valentine: Poems for Young Feminists. Illustrator Trisha Rafferty. Macmillan. ISBN 978-0-8050-5545-0.
- Neil Astley, ed. (2002). Staying alive: real poems for unreal times. Bloodaxe Books. ISBN 978-1-85224-588-7.
- Neil Astley, ed. (2003). Staying alive: real poems for unreal times. Miramax Books. ISBN 978-1-4013-5926-3.
- "Difficult Passages". Writing My Way Through Cancer. Jessica Kingsley Publishers. 2003. ISBN 978-1-84310-113-0.

=== Editor ===
- Carole Satyamurti; Hamish Canham, eds. (2003). Acquainted with the Night: psychoanalysis and the poetic imagination. Karnac. ISBN 978-1-85575-963-3.
- Noel Parry; Michael Rustin; Carole Satyamurti, eds. (1979). Social work, welfare, and the state. E. Arnold. ISBN 978-0-7131-6233-2.
