= Tracey Herd =

Scottish poet

- Born: 1968 (age 57–58)
- Education: University of Dundee

Tracey Herd (born 1968) is a Scottish poet based in Dundee.

== Education ==
Herd graduated from the University of Dundee in English and American Studies in 1991.

== Career ==
Herd's early works were published in anthologies such as New Women Poets (Bloodaxe Books, 1990), Eric, Gairfish (Duende: A Dundee Anthology, 1991), The Gregory Anthology 1991-1993, (Sinclair-Stevenson, 1993). After winning the Eric Gregory Award in 1993 and a Scottish Arts Council Bursary in 1995 Herd published her debut collection No Hiding Place (Bloodaxe, 1995) which was subsequently shortlisted for the Forward Prize's Best First Collection.

Herd's second collection, Dead Redhead (Bloodaxe Books, 2001) was published during her residency as a Creative Writing Fellow at Dundee University.

In 2002 Herd's collaboration with Scottish composer Gordon McPherson saw the production of a short opera titled Descent, performed by the Paragon Ensemble, which ran at Edinburgh's Traverse Theatre.

Her third published collection, Not In This World (Bloodaxe Books, 2015), was shortlisted for the T. S. Eliot Prize.

From 2009 to 2011 Herd was a Royal Literary Fund Fellow at Dundee University and currently is a Royal Literary Fund Lector.

One of Herd's great passions is horse-racing. Her first poem was published in Pacemaker, a horse-breeding magazine and she "has written online appreciations and obituaries of horses she admires." As a result of this passion she was invited in 2001 to read at Musselburgh Racecourse.

== Style ==
Don Paterson has described Herd's subject matter as "innocently domestic" becoming "darkly sexual" and John Kinsella promotes her work as "risky and challenging". Not In This World is a collection on "love and friendship...joy, grief and loss."
