= Anne Stevenson =

British-American poet (1933–2020)

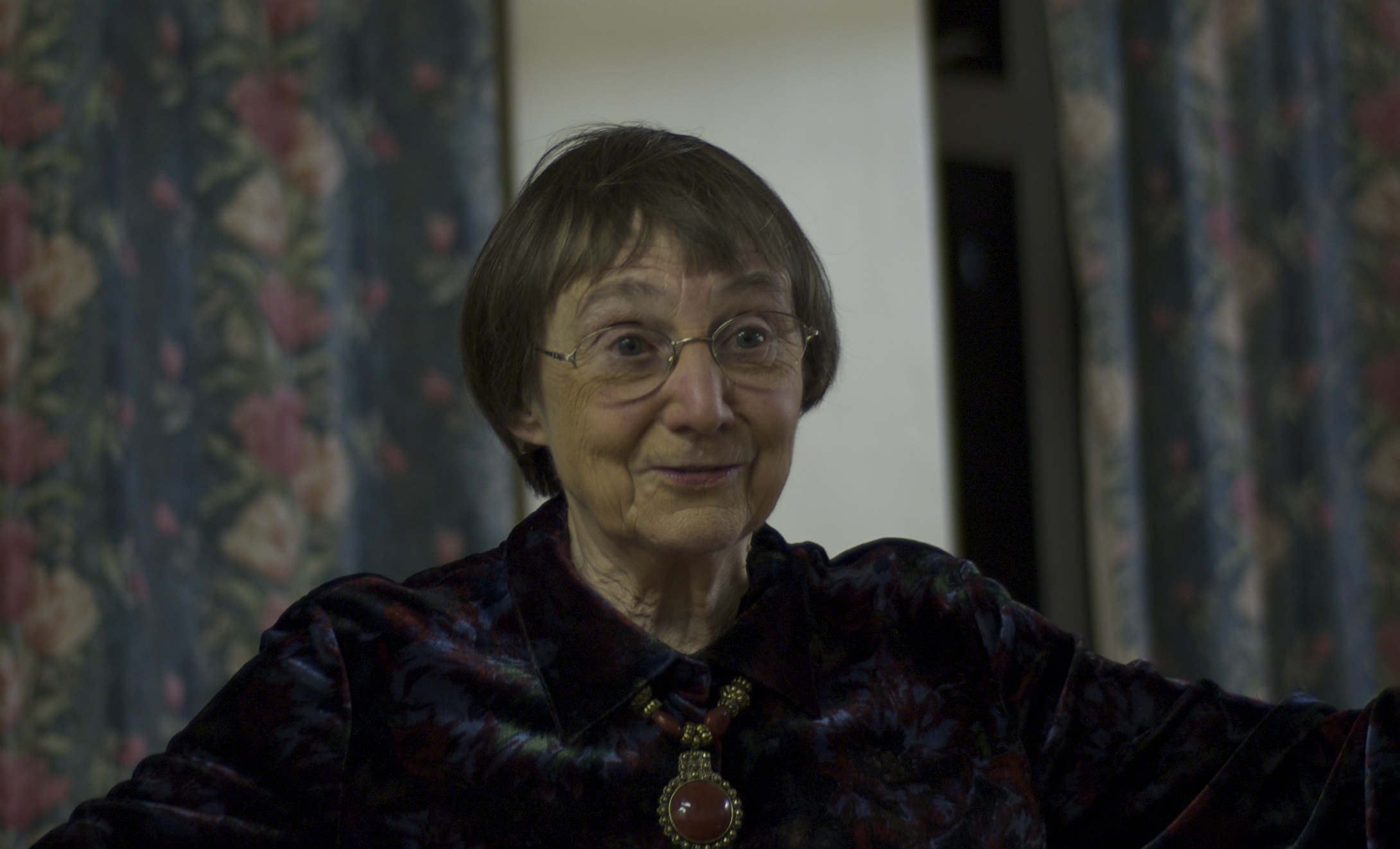
- Stevenson in 2009
- Born: Anne Katharine Stevenson; January 3, 1933; Cambridge, England
- Died: September 14, 2020 (aged 87); Durham, England
- Citizenship: United States
- Education: University of Michigan
- Occupation: Poet
- Father: Charles Stevenson
- Writing career
- Language: English
- Notable work: Bitter Fame: A Life of Sylvia Plath (1989)
- Notable awards: Lannan Lifetime Achievement Award

Anne Katharine Stevenson (January 3, 1933 – September 14, 2020) was an American-British poet and writer and recipient of a Lannan Literary Award.

== Life ==
Stevenson was the first daughter of Louise Destler Stevenson and philosopher Charles Stevenson and was born in Cambridge, England, where Charles was studying philosophy. The family returned to America when she was six months old, moving to New Haven, Connecticut. She was raised in New England and was educated in Ann Arbor, Michigan, where her father was a professor of philosophy. Her father was a devoted pianist and lover of poetry and her mother wrote fiction and was a talented storyteller. Stevenson learnt piano and cello and she assumed until she was 19 that she would be a professional musician. She studied music and languages, at the University of Michigan, where she began to lose her hearing; she prepared to be a writer instead. Obtaining her bachelor's degree in 1954 and graduating with honours, she returned to the UK where she lived the rest of her life.

Stevenson married a childhood friend but her romantic ideals dissolved and the marriage was not a success. She noted that "it took me two unhappy marriages and three children to make me reconsider my assumptions." In the 1960s she lived and wrote in Cambridge, Glasgow, Dundee and Oxford. She was writer in residence at the University of Dundee and co-founded Other Poetry (magazine) with Evangeline Patterson. In 1979, with Michael Farley, she started The Poetry Bookshop in Hay-on-Wye and in 1982 she moved to Sunderland, then Durham, where she lived with her husband Peter Lucas.

Stevenson was the author of over a dozen volumes of poetry and books of essays and literary criticism, including two critical studies of the poet Elizabeth Bishop. Her 1989 biography of the American poet Sylvia Plath, Bitter Fame: A Life of Sylvia Plath, sparked controversy; the ordeal that Stevenson endured in writing the book and in its reception were the focus of a 1993 series of articles in The New Yorker, by Janet Malcolm, which became the book The Silent Woman. Stevenson used a hearing aid; several of her poems (including "Hearing with my Fingers" and "On Going Deaf") refer to her experience of deafness.

Alfred Hickling at the Guardian reviewed Stevenson's work:

To arrive at a true understanding of Anne Stevenson's poetry, you have to go deep. In fact, the Deep is a very good place to start. Jutting into the Humber estuary like a vast steel fin, the Deep is Hull's impressive new aquatic attraction – where you expect to find tropical fish rather than topical poetry – yet the first thing the visitor sees, before descending to the bottom of Europe's deepest tank, is a line by Stevenson: "The sea is as near as we come to another world."

Stevenson also wrote the poem "The Miracle of Camp 60". It is a description of the Italian Chapel on the Orkney Island of Lamb Holm in 1992, from the perspective of a fictive Italian ex-POW. 'The miracle of Camp 60' is also used to refer directly to the Chapel in some cases.

Stevenson died from heart failure on September 14, 2020, at the age of 87.

== Awards ==
- 1955 Major Hopwood Award for Poetry
- 1990 Athena Alumnae Award from the University of Michigan.
- 1995 Cholmondeley Award
- 2002 inaugural winner of the Northern Rock Foundation Writer's Award
- 2007 Lannan Lifetime Achievement Award
- 2007 The Neglected Masters Award from the Poetry Foundation of America
- 2007 Taylor-Aiken Poet of the Year award from the University of the South in Tennessee
- 2008 Honorary Doctorate of Humane Letters from the University of Michigan.

== Books ==
- Living in America: Poems. Ann Arbor, MI: Generation Press, 1965.
- Elizabeth Bishop. New York: Twayne, 1966; London: Collins, 1967.
- Reversals. Middletown, CT: Wesleyan University Press, 1969. ISBN 978-0-8195-1047-1
- Travelling Behind Glass: Selected Poems, 1963–1973. London & New York: Oxford University Press, 1974.
- Correspondences: A Family History in Letters. Middletown, CT: Wesleyan University Press, 1974; London: Oxford University Press, 1974. ISBN 978-0-8195-4073-7
- Cliff Walk: A Poem, with a drawing by Anne Newnham. Richmond, Surrey: Keepsake Press, 1977. 180 copies.
- Enough of Green. Oxford & New York: Oxford University Press, 1977.
- A Morden Tower Reading. Newcastle upon Tyne: Morden Tower, 1977.
- Sonnets for Five Seasons. Herefordshire: Five Seasons Press, 1979. 250 copies.
- Green Mountain, Black Mountain. Boston: Rowan Tree Press, 1982.
- Minute by Glass Minute. Oxford & New York: Oxford University Press, 1982. ISBN 978-0-19-211947-6
- New Poems. Leamington Spa: Bath Place Community Arts Press, 1982. 100 copies.
- A Legacy. Durham: Taxus, 1983. 350 copies.
- Making Poetry. Oxford: Pisces Press, 1983. 200 copies.
- Black Grate Poems. Oxford: Inky Parrot Press, 1984. 360 copies.
- The Fiction-makers. Oxford & New York: Oxford University Press, 1985. ISBN 978-0-19-211972-8
- Selected Poems, by Frances Bellerby, edited by Stevenson London: Enitharmon Press, 1986.
- Winter Time. London: Mid-Northumberland Arts Group, 1986.
- Selected Poems, 1956–1986. Oxford: Oxford University Press, 1987. ISBN 978-0-19-282062-4
- 1985 Anthology: The Observer and Ronald Duncan Foundation International Poetry Competition, ed. with Amy Clampitt and Craig Raine. Beaworthy: Arvon Foundation, 1987.
- Bitter Fame: A Life of Sylvia Plath London: Viking, 1989; Boston: Houghton Mifflin, 1989. ISBN 978-0-395-45374-2
- The Other House. Oxford: Oxford University Press, 1990. ISBN 978-0-19-282739-5
- Four and a Half Dancing Men. Oxford & New York: Oxford University Press, 1993. ISBN 978-0-19-283164-4
- The Gregory Anthology 1991–1993, edited by Stevenson and Dannie Abse. London: Sinclair-Stevenson, 1994.
- The Collected Poems of Anne Stevenson, 1955–1995. Oxford: Oxford University Press, 1996.
- Five Looks at Elizabeth Bishop. London: Bellew, 1998. Tarset: Bloodaxe Books, 2006. ISBN 978-1-85224-725-6
- Between the Iceberg and the Ship: Selected Essays. Ann Arbor: University of Michigan Press, 1998.
- Granny Scarecrow. Tarset: Bloodaxe Books, 2000. ISBN 978-1-85224-534-4
- A Report from the Border: New & Rescued Poems, Bloodaxe Books, 2003, ISBN 978-1-85224-616-7
- Poems 1955–2005. Tarset: Bloodaxe Books, 2005. ISBN 978-1-85224-721-8
- A Lament For The Makers (Clutag Press, 2006)
- Stone Milk. Tarset: Bloodaxe Books, 2007. ISBN 978-1-85224-775-1
- Selected Poems edited with an introduction by Andrew Motion, Library of America, 2008
- Astonishment. Tarset: Bloodaxe Books, 2012. ISBN 978-1-85224-947-2
- In the Orchard. Enitharmon Editions, 2016. ISBN 9781910392836
- About Poems and how poems are not about: Newcastle/Bloodaxe Poetry Lectures. Hexham: Bloodaxe Books, 2017. ISBN 978-1-78037-345-4
- Completing the Circle. Hexham: Bloodaxe Books, 2020. ISBN 978-1-78037-498-7
