= Anne Brown (disambiguation) =

Anne Brown (1912–2009) was an American soprano.

Anne or Ann Brown may also refer to:

- Anne Brown (educator) (1854–1940), American teacher and principal
- Ann Brown (1943–1999), British educational psychologist
- Ann Brown (curler) (died 2006), American curler
- Ann Brown, chair of the U.S. Consumer Product Safety Commission from 1994 to 2001
- Anne Brown (game designer) (born 1962), American designer and editor of role-playing games
- Anne S. K. Brown (1906–1985), American military historian
- Ann Dudin Brown (1822–1917), English benefactor
- Anne Gust Brown (born 1958), American business executive and former First Lady of California
- Anna E. Brown, New Zealand academic specialising in book design

== See also ==
- Anna Brown (disambiguation)
- Annie Brown (disambiguation)
- Ann Browne (born 1955), Trinidadian international cricketer
- Anne Browne (c. 1495–1582), Tudor noblewoman
- Anne Browne (died 1511), wife of Charles Brandon, 1st Duke of Suffolk
