= Elliot Weisgarber =

Canadian composer

Elliot Weisgarber (1919 - 2001) was a Canadian composer, clarinetist and ethnomusicologist at the University of British Columbia from 1960 to 1984. He is the subject of "Marvellous!" The Life and Music of Elliot Weisgarber, a major biography written by his daughter Karen Suzanne Smithson, published in 2026.

== Education ==
Weisgarber studied clarinet with Rosario Mazzeo of the Boston Symphony and Gustave Langenus of New York. He went on to earn his performer's certificate at the Eastman School of Music (where he studied with Rufus Mont Arey) as well as bachelor's (1942) and master's (1943) degrees in composition. His composition teachers included Edward Royce, Bernard Rogers, Nadia Boulanger and Halsey Stevens.

== Career ==
Between 1944 and 1960 he taught at the Woman's College of the University of North Carolina.

In 1960 Weisgarber joined the faculty of the Music Department at the University of British Columbia in Vancouver, Canada where he spent the remainder of his life and career. From 1966 to 1969 he was the recipient of several Canada Council grants for the purpose of studying Japanese music in Japan where he became proficient in playing the shakuhachi. In 1974 he was a guest speaker at the Asian Composers' League conference in Kyoto and also participated in the UNESCO/ISME seminar in Tokyo. Two years later he addressed the Asian Composers' League again, this time in Taiwan, prior to which he had been a guest lecturer and visiting composer at the National University of Teheran. Weisgarber retired in 1984 and continued to compose until the time of his death.

== Compositions ==
Weisgarber's catalog of compositions consists of 450 separate works from short songs to symphonies, as well as a number of scores for film, radio and television. His style of composition reflects the depth of his Asian experience as well as the traditions of his western musical education. Examples of his work housed at the Canadian Music Centre include:

- Colloquies (flute & orchestra)
- Concerto for viola and string orchestra (1957)
- Five Pieces for Bassoon & Piano
- Kyoto Landscapes (large orchestra)
- Night (chorus & string quartet plus double bass)
- Quartet No. 6 (string quartet)
- Quintet "Aotearoa" (clarinet & string quartet)
- Seven Poems by Robinson Jeffers (voice & piano)
- Six Hokusai Miniatures (violin & piano)
- Woodwind Quintet

== Discography ==
- Elliot Weisgarber, Night, Vancouver Chamber Choir, Centrediscs, Canadian Music Centre, WRC8-6403, 1990
- Elliot Weisgarber, Sonatine, Playing Tribute Aulos Trio, CanSona Arts Media, 1998.
- Elliot Weisgarber, Immanences, Erica Northcott, soprano; Rena Sharon, piano; Laura Butler Frank, soprano; Peter Breykin, piano, Hermissenda Recordings HR0214, 1998
- Elliot Weisgarber, Miyako Sketches, Coastal Waves, Canadian Music Centre, WRC8-7233, 1998

== Writings ==
- The Honkyoku of the Kinko-Ryu: Some Principles of its Organization, Journal of the Society for Ethnomusicology, vol. 12 no. 3, Sept. 1968
- Mayonnaise on the Sashimi, Canadian Composer, 44, Nov. 1969
- A Composer Explains his "Trans-cultural" Music, Canadian Composer, 88, Feb. 1974

== Unpublished Work ==
- A Walk From the Mountain: A Search for a Lost Genius: a biography of pianist and composer Aurelio Giorni, 1895-1938

== Repositories of his Work ==
In addition to the finished scores at the Canadian Music Centre, the University Archives at the University of British Columbia's Irving K. Barber Learning Centre house a large collection of his original manuscripts and sketches.

== Additional Resource ==
- Elliot Weisgarber: Catalog of Works, compiled by Karen Suzanne Smithson, 2002
