= Carolyn Beebe =

American pianist (1873–1950)

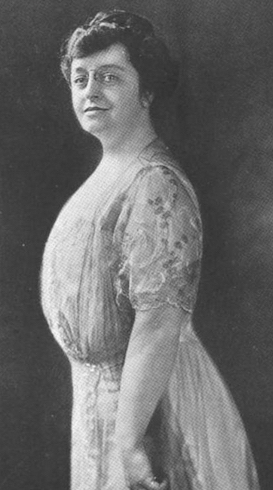
- Carolyn Beebe, from a 1922 publication
- Born: Carolyn Harding Beebe; September 30, 1873; Westfield, New Jersey
- Died: September 24, 1950 (aged 76); Mystic, Connecticut
- Other names: Carolyn Beebe Whitehouse
- Occupations: Pianist, music educator, arts administrator
- Years active: 1900-1945
- Known for: Founder and director of the New York Chamber Music Society, 1915-1937

Carolyn Harding Beebe (September 30, 1873 – September 24, 1950) was an American pianist born in Westfield, New Jersey. Her formal training first began when she was twelve with her aunt, Charlotte Beebe. Eventually, she began her studies under Joseph Mosenthal. She later moved abroad to Europe in 1903 to study under Moritz Moszkowski, and though she had been performing for years prior, she had her formal debut in 1903. When she moved back to the United States she began her career as a teacher for The Institute of Musical Art, which would be later known has The Juilliard School. She founded the New York Chamber Music Society in 1915, and the society had their last performance in 1937. She received a medal from the National Federation of Music Clubs in 1945 to recognize her and the New York Chamber Music Society.

== Early life ==
Carolyn Harding Beebe was born in Westfield, New Jersey. She was the daughter of Silas Edwin Beebe and Helen Louise Tift Beebe. Beebe discovered she could read music at three years old, and she had never been taught. She began taking lessons at age twelve with her first formal piano teacher; her aunt, Charlotte Beebe. She later became a piano student of musician Joseph Mosenthal. Beebe made frequent appearances on stage, including on March 8, 1900, where she was the accompanying pianist for the Kaltenborn Quartet. From 1903 to 1905 she studied abroad in Europe with German composer Moritz Moszkowski.

== Career ==
It was during her time in Europe where Carolyn Beebe performed with the Baudler String Quartet in Hamburg, along with many other instances of accompanying other quartets. Beebe made her debut as a solo pianist in Berlin, 1903. Not only did she perform, but also toured in Berlin, Paris, and Hamburg as a young woman, and had a busy schedule of appearances in the United States and Canada. By the end of her career, Carolyn Beebe had performed in over 300 cities across Europe, the United States, and Canada.

When Beebe returned to the United States in 1905, she began her teaching career on the faculty of Frank Damrosch's Institute of Musical Art from 1905-1919. She performed with a duo with Belgian violinist Édouard Dethier in 1906 and 1907, and chamber music with the Kneisel Quartet in 1908, and the Olive Mead Quartet in 1912. Not long after those performances, she then went on tour with Dethier during the time of 1908-1912, in a series of performances called the Beebe-Dethier Recitals. Furthermore, Beebe performed with the Chicago String Quartet in 1912, and partnered with the Aeolian Company's Duo-Art series, and created piano rolls with the company frequently throughout the time of 1918-1928. During the summer of 1912, she went back to Europe to study with Harold Bauer in Vevey and Paris. She also performed at a White House party for President Woodrow Wilson, and made piano roll recordings of several works.

Beebe was founder (with Gustave Langenus) and director of the New York Chamber Music Society. She recruited members of the New York Symphony Orchestra, with the goal of the group being to perform unique and unheard works. When the Society had their debut on December 17, 1915, she was the only woman performing, and still the only woman in the group's eleven-member roster in 1917 and in 1922. The Society gave first performances of dozens of new compositions, featuring works by Deems Taylor, Samuel Coleridge-Taylor, Henry Holden Huss, and Ethel Leginska.

Carolyn Beebe was also a member of SPAM (Society for the Publication of American Music), a society that would publish work for underground composers. In 1919, she left The Institute of Musical Art and she founded her own teaching studio near Carnegie Hall; Beebe Music Studios. Carolyn Beebe taught piano at her studio, along with her associate Ardelle Harrington, and Beebe's sister Helen Beebe, who taught voice. Beebe declared radio "valuable to art" in a 1922 interview. "The radio audience in no different than the concert, opera, or vaudeville audience. It is composed of the same people, and whatever pleases them outside their homes will please them within their homes."

May of 1926 is when Beebe went back to Europe once again to look for more music. That same year, the National Federation of Music Clubs began offering a prize named for Carolyn Beebe, valued at $1,000, for chamber music compositions.

Carolyn Beebe served on the board of the National Orchestral Association from 1930, and on the board of the National Association of American Composers and Conductors from 1933. After the New York Chamber Music Society's last concert on February 14, 1937, Beebe gradually began to retire from the music business. Despite that, she continued to serve as a chairman on the National Federation of Music Clubs. Because of her dedication to the federation and her work with the New York Chamber Music Society, she received a medal from the National Federation of Music Clubs in 1945.

== Personal life ==
Carolyn Beebe married a medical doctor, a dermatologist named Henry Howard Whitehouse, in 1932. Whitehouse died in 1938. Carolyn Beebe Whitehouse died in 1950, aged 76 years, in Mystic, Connecticut.
