= Johanna Kroeber Mosenthal =

American paleontologist and educator

- Born: February 8, 1880; New York City
- Died: September 13, 1969 (aged 89)
- Education: Bryn Mawr College
- Occupation: Paleontologist
- Employer: American Museum of Natural History
- Spouse: Herman O. Mosenthal
- Relatives: Alfred Kroeber (brother); Ursula K. Le Guin (niece)

Johanna Kroeber Mosenthal (February 8, 1880–September 13, 1969) was an American paleontologist and educator. She served as a research assistant in biology and paleontology to Henry Fairfield Osborn at the American Museum of Natural History for almost thirty years, and was the younger sister of anthropologist Alfred Kroeber.

== Biography ==
Johanna Kroeber was born on February 8, 1880 in New York City to Johanna Muller and Florence Kroeber. She had two older brothers, Alfred and Edward, and a younger sister, Elsbeth. The family spoke German in the household, and all of the siblings acquired a scholarly interest in the sciences; Elsbeth became a biology teacher and Alfred an influential anthropologist at the University of California, Berkeley.

Kroeber was educated at Miss Anne Brown's School for Girls and the J. Sachs School for Girls, which later became Dwight School, in New York City. She received scholarships to attend Bryn Mawr College, where she studied biology under Thomas Hunt Morgan. She graduated in 1900 and published a scientific article on the regenerative processes of Allolobophora worms in The Biological Bulletin in the same year.

From 1900 to 1903, Kroeber taught at the Sachs School while also taking graduate level courses at Columbia University, then taught German and Biology at Wadleigh High School until 1908. In 1908, she married physician Herman O. Mosenthal, and began working as a research assistant in the Department of Paleontology at the American Museum of Natural History under Henry Fairfield Osborn. Her work supported Osborn's research on horses, opossums, as well as a biography of Edward Drinker Cope.

Kroeber was employed at the AMNH for 28 years, and was otherwise involved in the community; she served on the board of the New York Association for the Aid of Crippled Children, as well as the New York Diabetes Association. During World War II, she worked on the American Friends Service Committee and supported the war effort by sewing jackets in a factory.

She had four children with Herman Mosenthal: Barbara, Joseph, Joan Elizabeth, and Edward Kroeber, and her niece was science fiction author Ursula K. Le Guin. Kroeber died on September 13, 1969 at the age of eighty-nine.
