= Ludvig Sandöe Ipsen =

Danish-American illustrator and designer (1840–1920)

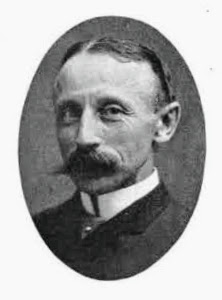
- Ipsen c. 1886
- Born: April 20, 1840; Copenhagen, Denmark
- Died: 1920 (aged 79–80); Malden, Massachusetts, US
- Known for: Book illustration, graphic and decorative design
- Notable work: The Prince and The Pauper (1881); Sonnets from the Portuguese (1886); Forest Hills Cemetery crematorium
- Children: Ernest Ludvig Ipsen
- Years active: 1870s-1900s

Ludvig Sandöe Ipsen (April 20, 1840 – 1920) was a Danish-American artist and designer. Trained as an architect, he is known for his designs in a wide variety of disciplines.

== Early life and education ==
Ludvig Sandöe Ipsen was born on April 20, 1840, to Ludvig Ipsen and Mette Margrethe Ipsen (née Bøgh) in Copenhagen, Denmark.

He trained as an architect at the Royal Danish Academy of Fine Arts, School of Architecture in Copenhagen. In 1860, shortly after graduation, he entered the military, serving in the engineering corps and participating in the Second Schleswig War in 1864.

== Career ==
After military service, Ipsen worked for a few years in the office of a Copenhagen architect before emigrating to the United States. He found work with the Boston architect Henry W. Hartwell, and was later a member of the firm Hartwell & Swasey. By 1875, he had abandoned the practice of architecture in favor of the decorative arts and illustration. He did, however, return to architecture at least once, for the design of a crematorium chapel.

=== Book illustration ===
Ipsen was employed as a staff illustrator by the James R. Osgood publishing firm in Boston and also worked for several other local publishers.

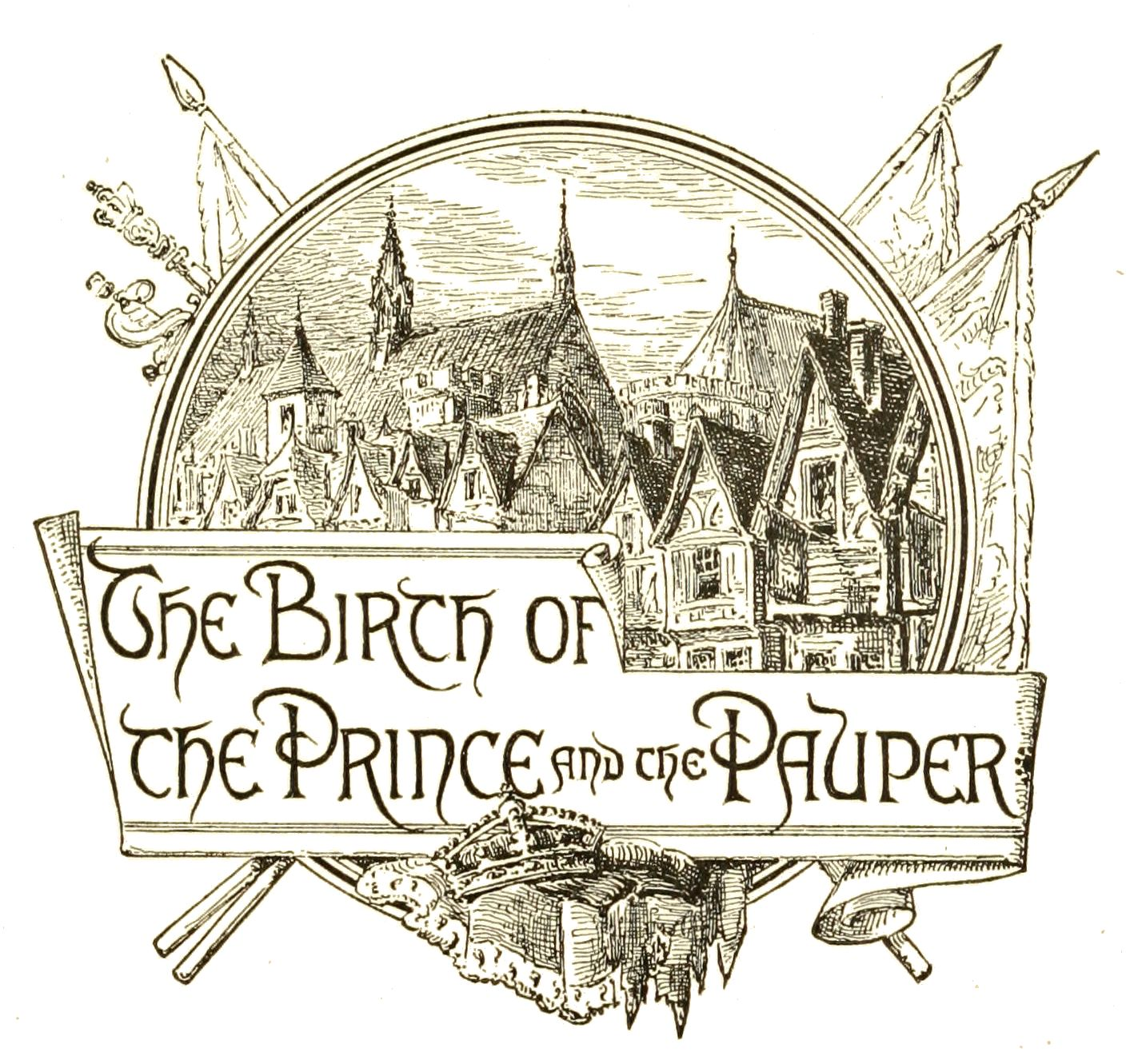
Chapter heading for The Prince and The Pauper by L. S. Ipsen

- The Skeleton in Armor by Henry Wadsworth Longfellow (1877)
- The Scarlet Letter by Nathaniel Hawthorne (1878)
- The Confessions of a Frivolous Girl by Robert Grant (1880)
- The Prince and the Pauper by Mark Twain, sharing illustration credit with Frank T. Merrill and John J. Harley. (1881)
- The Lady of the Lake by Sir Walter Scott (1883)
- Marmion by Sir Walter Scott (1885)
- Eudora by M. B. M. Toland (1888)

The book that brought Ipsen the most acclaim was Sonnets from the Portuguese by Elizabeth Barrett Browning, issued in 1886 by Ticknor and Company of Boston.

=== Other works on paper ===
Shortly after the Boston-based men's choral society, the Apollo Club, was incorporated, Ipsen was commissioned by Arthur Reed, the club secretary, to illustrate the club's publications, and he designed 130 program covers over the course of 23 years, as well as designing the club's seal in 1876. The club's records, now held by the Massachusetts Historical Society, include fifty-one original illustrations created for Apollo Club concert programs.

=== Typography ===
In 1903, Ipsen was granted two patents for typefaces created for the American Type Founders Company (ATF): Florentine Bold Condensed (pat. no. 36,366) and Florentine Bold Extra Condensed (pat. no. 36,367). The fonts were variants of the Florentine typeface which first appeared in the ATF 1896 catalog. That catalog did not acknowledge a designer but the typographical historian Max McGrew credited Ipsen and the National Museum of American History holds original drawings for the related font Florentine Heavy dated 1896 and ascribed to Ipsen. He also designed decorative borders and initials for ATF.

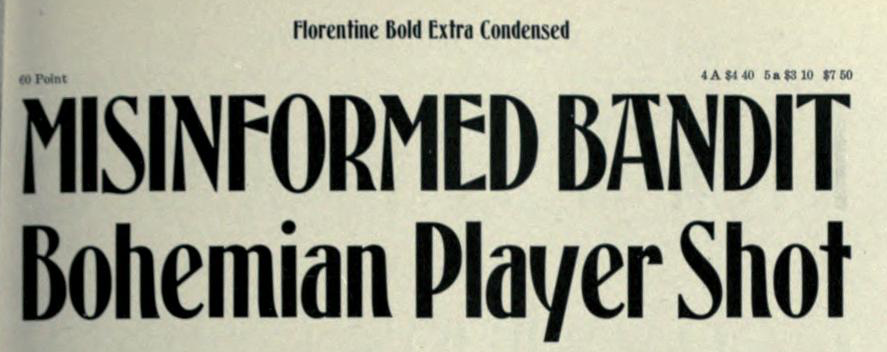
Florentine Bold Extra Condensed font, ATF catalog, 1912

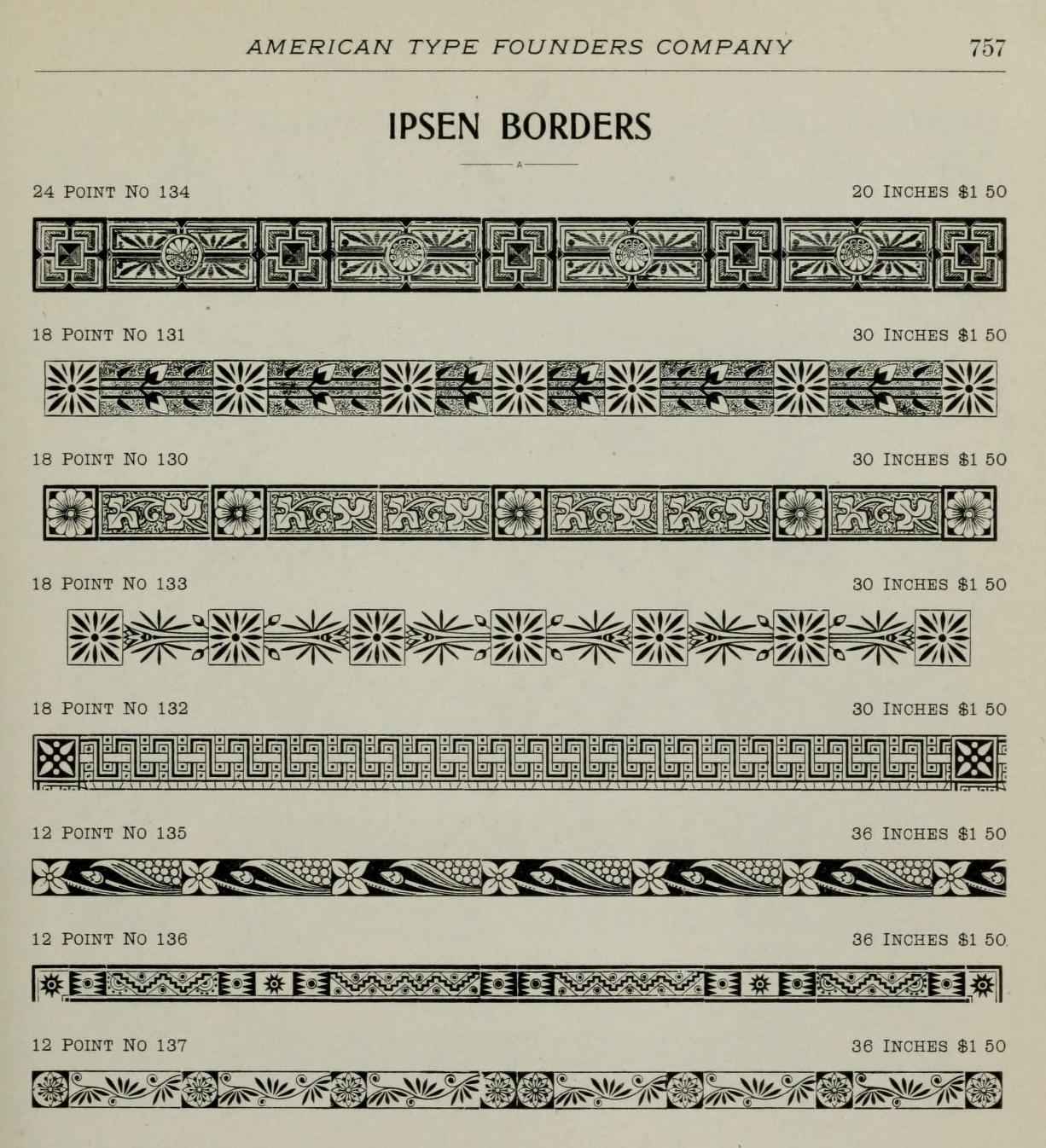
Decorative borders, ATF catalog, 1900

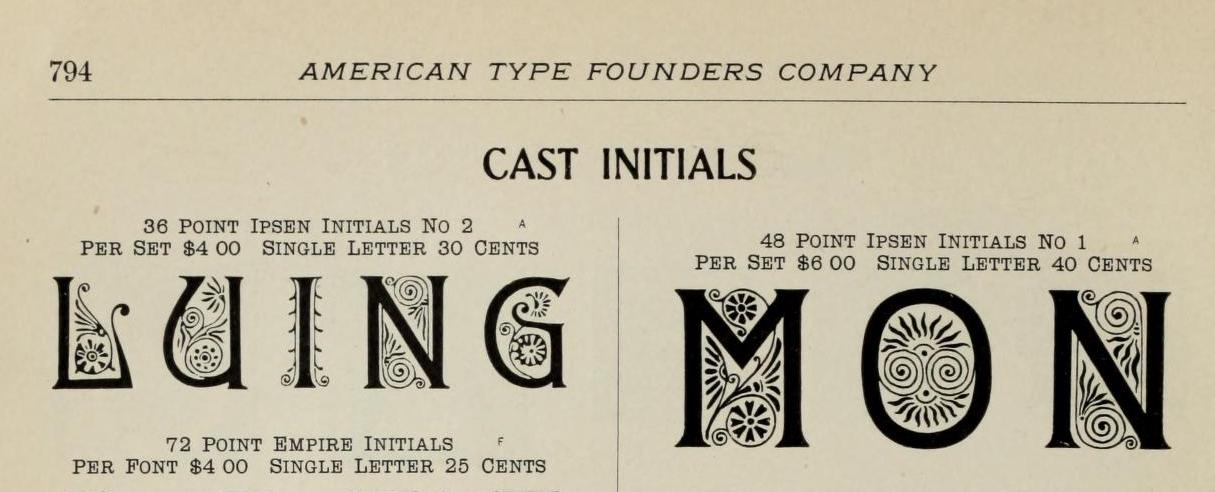
Decorative initials, ATF catalog, 1900

=== Architecture and architectural elements ===
In 1893, the Massachusetts Cremation Society opened a crematorium designed by Ipsen and built of Roxbury felsite in the neoclassical style. Now owned by Forest Hills Cemetery, it includes the Lucy Stone Chapel, named after the Boston abolitionist and suffragist who was the first person cremated there.

Ipsen received a commission in 1910 to design a pair of iron gates for the Converse Memorial Library, which was designed by H. H. Richardson, in Malden. The gates enclose a garden designed by Frederick Law Olmsted.

== Personal life ==
Ipsen emigrated to the United States in 1867, arriving first in New York, where he married Emma Petrea Petersen (1846–1914) in Manhattan on August 10, 1868. Emma, also born in Copenhagen, was a well-known mezzo-soprano who performed in recital halls and churches. She was the sister of John Petersen (1839–1874), a marine painter also known as Johan Erik Christian Petersen.

The couple had moved to Malden, Massachusetts by the following year when their son, Ernest, was born. Ernest Ludvig Ipsen (1869–1951) became an internationally renowned portrait painter.

== Gallery ==
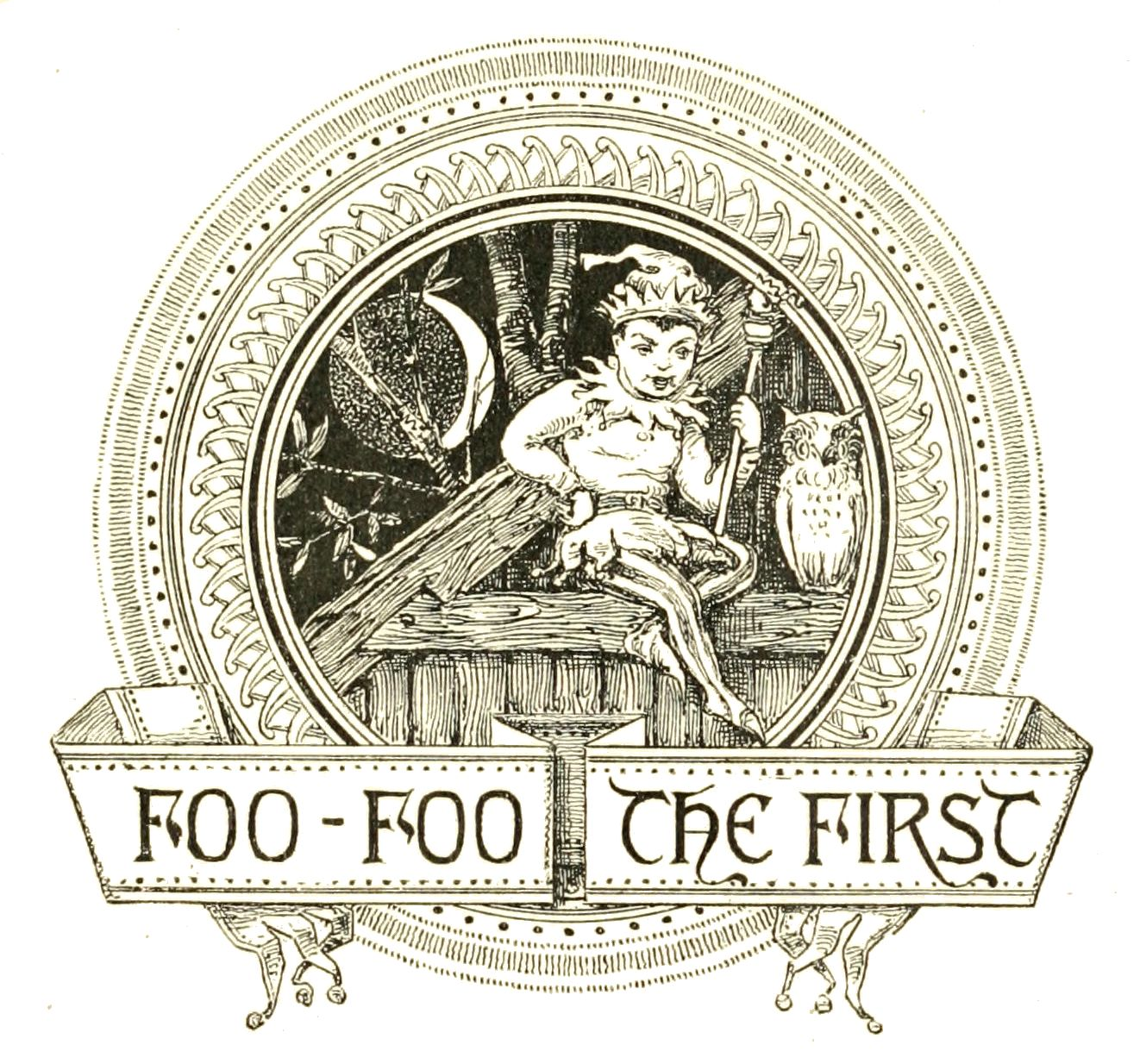
L. S. Ipsen, The Prince and The Pauper chapter heading, 1881

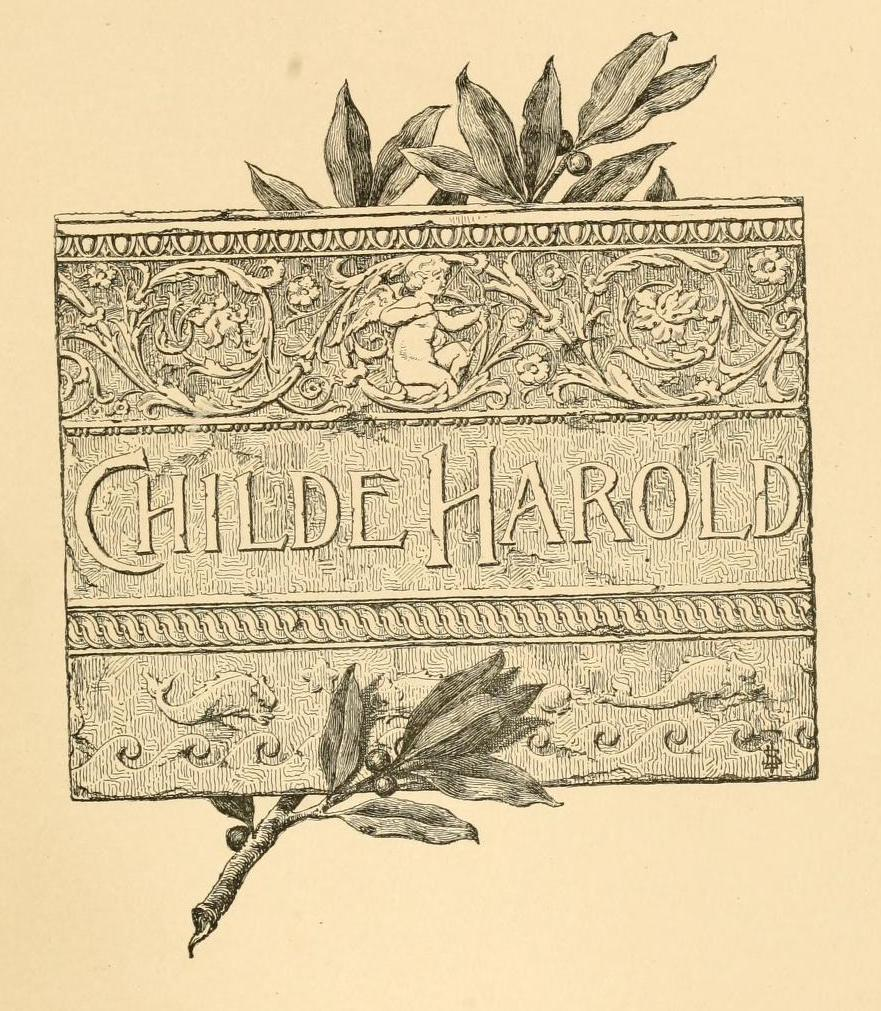
L. S. Ipsen, Half-title illustration, Childe Harold's Pilgrimage by Lord Byron, 1886

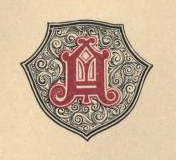
L. S. Ipsen, Title page ornament, The Scarlet Letter, 1878

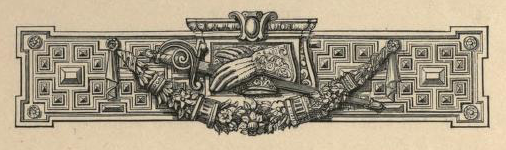
L. S. Ipsen, Contents page header, The Scarlet Letter, 1878

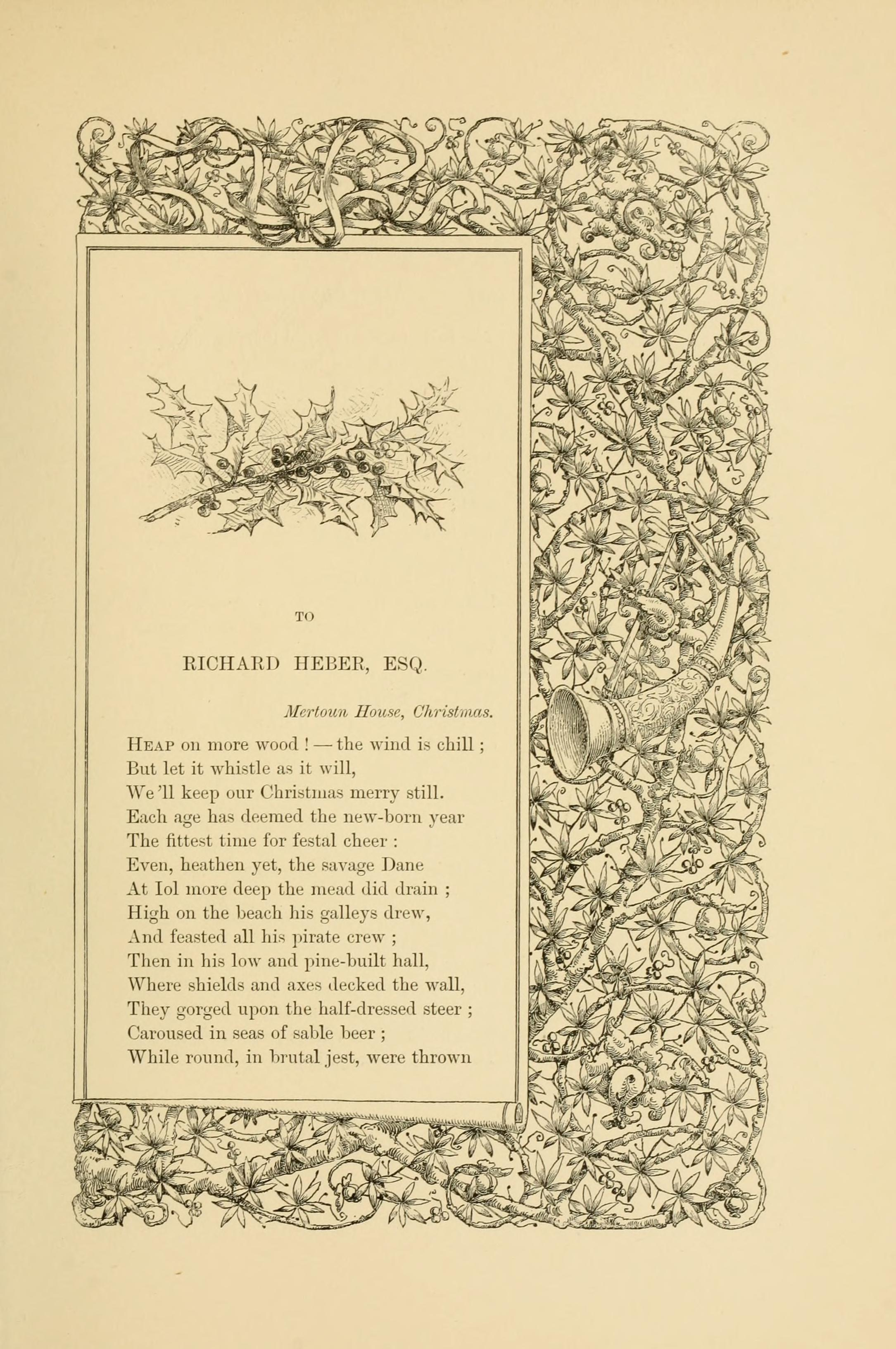
Sir Walter Scott, Marmion, Canto 6, illustrated by Ludvig S. Ipsen, 1885

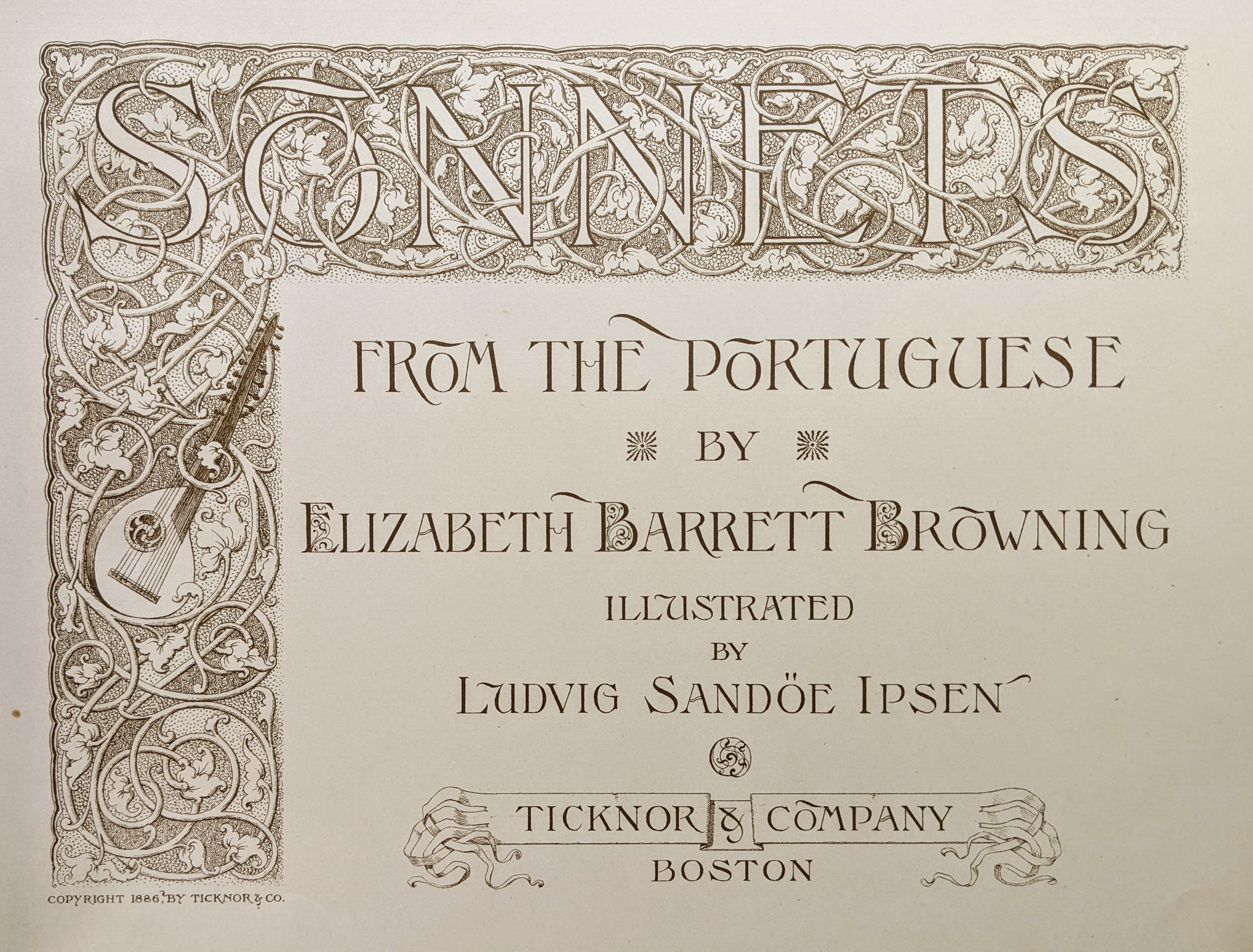
Sonnets from the Portuguese, title page, 1886

== Sources ==
- Truesdell, Winfred Porter (1904). The Book-plates of Ludvig Sandöe Ipsen. Boston: The Truesdell Press.
- The American Bookmaker, Volumes 3-4. New York: Moore Publishing Company. 1887.
