= Margaret Ruthven Lang =

American composer (1867–1972)

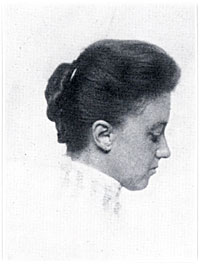
- Lang, before c. 1904 (Note: This image appears in Elson (1904, p. 296), so must originate from during or before 1904. It was reprinted in Syford (1912, p. 22))
- Born: November 27, 1867; Boston, Massachusetts, U.S.
- Died: May 29, 1972 (aged 104); Boston, Massachusetts, U.S.
- Occupations: Composer; violinist

Margaret Ruthven Lang (November 27, 1867 – May 29, 1972) was an American composer and violinist primarily active in Boston. Lang is often considered the first woman composer to have a composition performed by a major American symphony orchestra, when her now-lost Dramatic Overture was premiered by the Boston Symphony Orchestra in 1893.

== Life ==
=== Early life and education ===
Margaret Lang was born in Boston, Massachusetts on November 27, 1867. She was the eldest child of Frances Morse Burrage Lang, an amateur singer, and Benjamin Johnson "B. J." Lang, active as a conductor, pianist, organist and composer. Her father was a central figure in Boston's musical life, and as the city's leading choral conductor, he founded two choral societies: the Apollo Club and Boston Cecilia; as an organist he was closely associated with the Handel and Haydn Society and a number of city churches. These connections through B.J. permitted Margaret's music to be regularly included in the programs of these ensembles. The Lang family home was a center of cosmopolitan music-making, hosting many of the period's most eminent musical figures, including Hans von Bülow, Antonín Dvořák and Ignacy Jan Paderewski. As B.J. was a devoted Wagnerite, the Langs were close friends of Cosima and Richard Wagner, and the former's father, Franz Liszt; Margaret knew the Wagner children as playmates. The family was also associated with many American musicians, particularly since the elder Lang's students included William Foster Apthorp and Ethelbert Nevin, and three members of the future so-called Second New England School, George Whitefield Chadwick, Arthur Foote and Edward MacDowell.

Biographer Juliana Yap remarked that "Margaret Ruthven Lang was groomed at an early age to become one of the most prolific and accomplished women composers in the United States." Her father served as her principal teacher during her youth, instructing her in both composition and piano through a pedagogy that emphasized technical mastery. Lang composed her first works at age 12, and studied violin with the Boston-based violinist Louis Schmidt. Echoing her father's early training in Germany, the 19-year-old Lang traveled to Munich with her mother to study music between 1885 and 1887. She likely did not attend the Munich's Royal Conservatory of Music, as women were barred from counterpoint classes until 1898. Instead, she studied counterpoint and fugue privately with the Conservatory professor Victor Gluth, while receiving violin instruction from Franz Drechsler and Ludwig Abel. Upon returning to Boston, Margaret studied orchestration and composition with Chadwick, who was then professor at the New England Conservatory. According to biographer Cline, "Lang was a serious pupil, undertaking the composition of large instrumental forms as well as solo piano works, art songs and choral pieces." She also studied occasionally with J. C. D. Parker, and John Knowles Paine, another member of the Second New England School.

=== Career ===
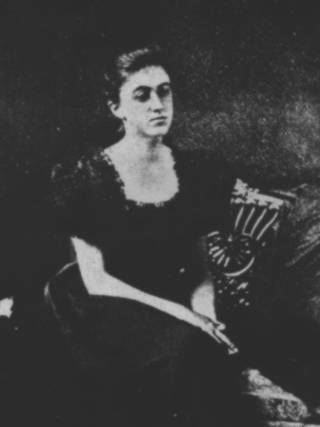
Margaret Ruthven Lang, c. 1900

Lang composed over 130 songs. many published by A. P. Schmidt Co. of Boston. However, it was the April 1893 debut of her Dramatic Overture, Op. 12, that made history. The Boston Symphony Orchestra, under the direction of Arthur Nikisch, premiered the work, making the piece the first composition by a woman to be performed by a major American symphony orchestra. Though the piece did elicit some positive and constructive reviews, the Dramatic Overture was never repeated. Almost immediately after the performance by the Boston Symphony, a second overture, Witichis, Op. 10, was performed at the 1893 World's Fair (Columbian Exposition) in Chicago under the direction of Theodore Thomas. Other large works included compositions for voice and orchestra. B. J. Lang conducted some of Margaret's works. Margaret was very critical of her work, however, and was known to destroy pieces that she did not feel confident of. Consequently, none of her works for orchestra are extant, likely destroyed by Margaret herself.

Theodore Presser published her final composition, Three Pianoforte Pieces for Young Players, Op. 60, in 1919. After she stopped composing, Margaret devoted much of her energy to religious work. Though her family belonged to the Unitarian Universalist church, Margaret became a devout Episcopalian, and attended the Church of the Advent in Boston. Between 1927 and 1939, she anonymously wrote, published and printed devotional pamphlets entitled "Messages from God" which were distributed throughout the United States and as far as Egypt. Using her own money to fund the project, Margaret recorded in an autobiographical note that over 6,000 copies of these books were produced and sent throughout the world, free of charge to the recipient.

Margaret also holds the record for the longest consecutive subscriber to the Boston Symphony Orchestra, totaling 91 years. In 1967 the orchestra performed a concert in honor of Margaret's 100th birthday. Margaret died May 29, 1972, six months short of her 105th birthday.She is one of the only known woman composers to pass their centenary, described by Aaron Cohen as "the most long lived of all women composers".

== Music ==
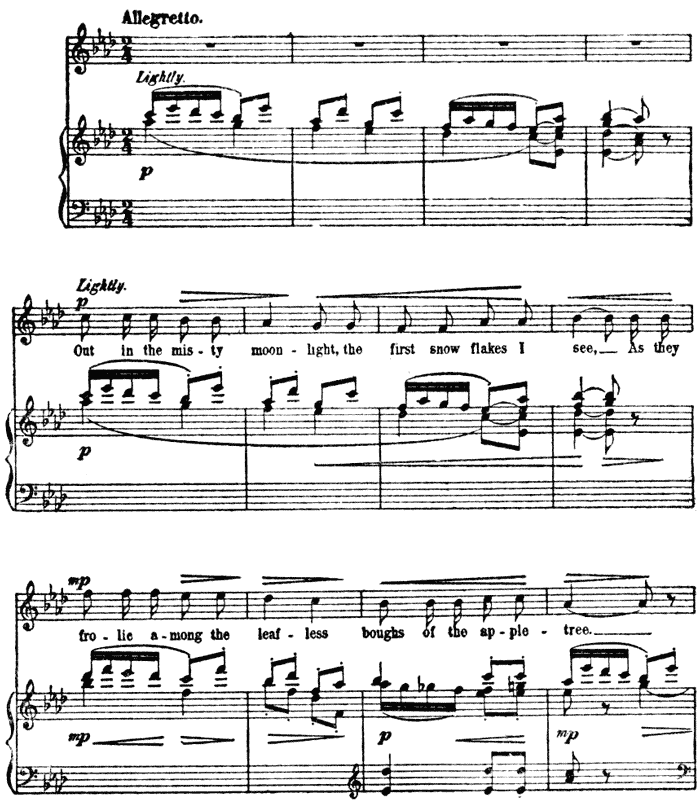
"Ghosts" by Lang, reprinted in Hughes 1900, p. 435

Musicologist Alan Levy remarks that "Lang’s composition style was a mixture of German Romanticism and Impressionism, with relatively conservative use of harmonic dissonance and clear elements of Irish and Scottish folk melodies." For instance, of her many songs, the best known is "An Irish Love Song," Op. 22 (1894), which maintains an Irish folk music influence. Although her harmonic vocabulary was generally conservative, Lang had a "judicious use of dissonance".

Several compositions are available in modern editions through Hildegard Publishing. These include Nonsense Rhymes and Pictures by Edward Lear, Op. 42, O Jala, Spinning Song, Irish Love Song, and Snowflakes, as well as other songs and piano works in compilations with works by other women composers. Her Irish Love Song was a particular favorite among audiences and was recorded by several famous singers, including Ernestine Schumann-Heink and Alma Gluck. Many of the autograph copies of Margaret's songs can be found in the Arthur P. Schmidt papers in the Library of Congress.

Although Lang composed a number of orchestral works, they are all lost.

== Discography ==
Many of Margaret's songs were very popular during her lifetime. In the Twilight and Irish Love Song were the most performed. Many vocalists recorded versions of them and several of the recordings are available in a restored version.

Recordings of compositions by Margaret Ruthven Lang
Year	Album	Performers	Label
1997	Ernestine Schumann-Heink: The Complete Recordings, Volume 1: 1900–09	Ernestine Schumann-Heink	Romophone
1997	Songs and Ballads	Richard Crooks	Nimbus Records
2000	"Ah! Love but a day": Songs and Spirituals by Women Composers	Various	Albany Records
2011	Love is Everywhere: Selected Songs of Margaret Ruthven Lang	Donald George (Tenor); Lucy Mauro (Piano)	Delos Productions
