= Alice Hunt Bartlett Prize =

Poetry prize

The Alice Hunt Bartlett Prize was awarded by the Poetry Society of London for a collection of poetry. It is named after Alice Hunt Bartlett who was the American editor of the society's Poetry Review from 1923 to 1949. The prize was established in 1966.

== Winners ==
- 1966: Gavin Bantock for Christ: A Poem in 26 parts and Paul Roche for All Things Considered
- 1967: Ted Walker for The Solitaires: Poems 1964-65
- 1968: Gael Turnbull for A Trampoline: Poems 1952–64
- 1969: Tom Raworth for The Relation Ship
- 1970: Leslie Norris for Ransoms
- 1971: Geoffrey Hill for Mercian Hymns
- 1972: Paul Evans for February
- 1973: Rodney Pybus for In Memoriam Milena
- 1974: Allen Fisher for Place and Bill Griffiths for War With Windsor
- 1975: Elizabeth Ashworth for A New Confusion
- 1976: Lee Harwood for HMS Little Fox and Andrew Crozier for Pleats
- 1977: Kit Wright for The Bear Looked Over the Mountain
- 1978: John Montague for The Great Cloak
- 1979: Simon Lowy for Melusine and the Negredo
- 1980: John Whitworth for Unhistorical Fragments
- 1981: Thomas McCarthy for The Sorrow Garden and Carol Rumens for Unplayed Music
- 1982: Medbh McGuckian for Venus in the Rain and The Flower Master
- 1983: David Constantine for Watching for Dolphins
- 1984: Alison Fell for Kisses for Mayakovsky and Paul Hyland for The Stubborn Forest
- 1985: Vikram Seth for The Humble Administrator's Garden and John Davies for The Visitor's Book
- 1986: Helen Dunmore for The Sea Skater
- 1987: Sujata Bhatt for Brunizem

== See also ==
- List of British literary awards
- British poetry
- List of poetry awards
- List of years in poetry
- List of years in literature
