= John Davies (poet, born 1944) =

Welsh poet

John Davies is a Welsh poet whose first collection, The Strangers, was published in 1974. He was awarded the Alice Hunt Bartlett Prize in 1985.

== Early life and career ==
John Davies was born in 1944 and brought up in Cymmer, a coal mining village in the Afan Valley, some ten miles north of Port Talbot in south Wales. He was the eldest child of Betty Dymond Davies née Chappell of Cymmer and John Vyrnwy Davies from Penclawdd, a coal mining and cockling village on the Gower peninsula. They were married in St John's Church, Cymmer, in 1942.

Davies writes about Cymmer and his family in the first three poems of his 1985 collection, The Visitor's Book, and again in Starting Point in his 1991 collection, Flight Patterns, where he writes: "Where you started from didn't stop because you left...You keep on looking back...You were never meant to leave and can't..." Davies also draws upon his uncle Joseph Chappell, a coal miner in Cymmer, in The Voice Box (in The Visitor's Book) and in Farmland (in Flight Patterns).

Much of Davies' work has been concerned with roots, language and belonging, as Professor Elinor Shaffer has elaborated in her study of literary devolution. Shaffer deals sensitively with what she calls the linguistic divisions within Davies' family, but it's not an issue that Davies shies away from. In his poem, The Visitor’s Book, we learn that his father's first language was Welsh, but his mother's was English. He also tells us that his wife and daughter speak Welsh, but he does not. But these linguistic fissures ran deeper: Davies' Cymmer grandfather, Gomer Chappell, spoke Welsh, as did two of his brothers, but his third brother, Joseph, did not, though Joseph's wife did.

In 1954, the family moved to steel-making and English-speaking Port Talbot, a town with a rich cultural tradition, including connections with the poets Ruth Bidgood, Sally Roberts Jones, Moelwyn Merchant, Dylan Thomas, Edward Thomas and Gwyn Williams.

John Davies attended Dyffryn Grammar School in the town. Some of his early poems were published in The Wayfarer, the school magazine. Davies' English master at Dyffryn was R. Selwyn Davies, remembered as a "revered" teacher who “embraced contemporary poetry.”

After Dyffryn, Davies studied at the University College of Wales, Aberystwyth He then taught English at Prestatyn High School, in north Wales, later becoming an extramural tutor in English.

Davies has also taught at the University of Michigan and Washington State University, and he was a visiting Professor of Poetry at the Brigham Young University, Utah, 1987–88. Three of his collections, The Visitor's Book (1985), Flight Patterns (1991) and Dirt Roads (1997), include his reflections on his time in America.

Davies' visits to America stimulated an interest in carving, and his wood carvings of birds have since been written about and exhibited, leading one reviewer to note that Davies has "the gift of being a wordsmith and a woodworker - two of the intrinsic crafts of the Welsh tradition." And in John Davies’ case, it was also a craft within his own family's tradition: two of his paternal uncles were woodworkers, as is Davies’ brother.

In 2023, Davies published Bird River, with chapters on wood carving, and on the art of sourcing driftwood along the river, as well as sharing personal portraits of many figures of note in the wood carving and literary spheres.

From 1976 to 1980, Davies was the Reviews Editor for the Anglo-Welsh Review.

He was awarded the Oriel Poetry Prize in 1981.

In 1985, Davies was joint winner, with Vikram Seth, of the Poetry Society's the Alice Hunt Bartlett Prize, awarded for his fifth collection, The Visitor's Book, which has been described as "one of the most considerable books of poetry by any Anglo-Welsh poet in many years."

== Poetry collections ==
John Davies has published eight collections of poetry:

- The Strangers, 1974, Swansea: Christopher Davies
- Spring in a Small Town, 1979, Mold: Centre for Ed. Tech.
- At the Edge of Town, 1981, Llandysul: Gomer
- The Silence in the Park, 1982, Bridgend: Poetry Wales Press
- The Visitor's Book, 1985, Bridgend: Seren
- Flight Patterns, 1991, Bridgend: Seren
- Dirt Roads, 1997, Bridgend: Seren
- North by South: New and Selected Poems, 2002, Bridgend: Seren

North by South was Davies' last collection. An extended review in the literary journal, Acumen, provides a summary evaluation of his work as a whole: "His voice...is assured, confident in its tones and its focus...Reading the volume you get a strong sense of Davies' control over his poems' formal aspects...Davies' subject matter is wide-ranging and he can turn on the form at will...He is a master craftsman..."

== Poetry journals, anthologies and broadcasts ==
John Davies' work has appeared in literary journals and magazines, including Oxford Poetry, Stand, Planet, New Welsh Review, Literature and Belief, Poetry Wales, Stanza, Outposts Poetry Quarterly, The Anglo-Welsh Review, Cumberland Poetry Review, Lines Review, Tar River Poetry, New Mexico Humanities Review, North Dakota Quarterly and The Seattle Review.

Davies has been published in a number of poetry anthologies.

- Abse, D. ed. (1983) Wales in Verse, London: Secker and Warburg.
- Abse, D. ed. (1997) Twentieth Century Anglo-Welsh Poetry, Bridgend: Seren.
- Curtis, T. ed. (1986) Wales: the Imagined Nation, Studies in Cultural and National Identity, Bridgend: Poetry Wales Press.
- Ellis, A. T. ed. (1989) Wales: An Anthology, London: Collins
- Garlick, R. and Mathias, R. eds. (1984) Anglo-Welsh Poetry 1480-1980, Bridgend: Poetry Wales Press
- Lloyd, D. ed. (1994) The Urgency of Identity: Contemporary English-language Poetry from Wales, Evanston: Northwestern University.
- Stephens, M. ed. (1987) A Book of Wales, London: J.M. Dent
- Stephens, M. ed. (1991) The Bright Field, Manchester: Carcanet

Davies has also read his poems on BBC Radio Wales, BBC Radio 4 and on BBC Television.

The British Library holds five recordings of Davies reading his poetry, including one reading at the Anglo-Welsh Poetry Festival in 1983.

== Edited anthologies ==
John Davies has edited four anthologies:

- Here in North Wales, Mold: Centre for Ed. Tech., 1982 (with John Pook)
- The Valleys, Bridgend: Poetry Wales Press, 1984 (with Mike Jenkins)
- The Streets and the Stars: An Anthology of Writing from Wales, Bridgend: Seren, 1995 (with Melvyn Jones)
- The Green Bridge: Stories from Wales, Bridgend: Seren, 2019

== Essays on the work of John Davies ==
- Hooker, J. (1987) The Presence of the Past: Essays on Modern British and American Poetry, Bridgend: Poetry Wales Press
- Poole, R. (1988) Two Kinds of Poetic Thought: Robert Minhinnick and John Davies in Anglo-Welsh Review no. 88, Aberystwyth: AWR
- Poole, R. (1995) The Poetry of John Davies in Poetry Wales, no. 1, Bridgend: Poetry Wales
- Roberts, D. (1993/94) The Poet as Woodcarver: The Bird Carvings of John Davies in Planet, 102, December, Aberystwyth: Planet
- Smith, P. (1989) Isolation, identification, space: some themes on the poems of John Davies in Poetry Wales no. 4, Bridgend: Poetry Wales
- Smith, C. J. P. (May 2003) Pebbles and Poems: John Davies in Acumen Literary Journal, no.46, Brixham: Acumen Publications
- Thomas, A. (1991)The Poetry of John Davies: Wales and America in New Welsh Review, no.12, Cardiff: NWR.
- Williams, N. (2003) John Davies: The Geography of Life Round Here in Poetry Wales, no. 4. Spring, Bridgend: Poetry Wales

== Bibliography ==
- Ballin, M. (2013) Welsh Periodicals in English 1882-2012, Cardiff: University of Wales Press
- Burton, P.H. (1969) Early Doors: My Life and the Theatre, New York: The Dial Press
- Burton, R. (2012 ) The Richard Burton Diaries, London: Yale University Press
- Corcoran, N. ed. (2007) The Cambridge Companion to Twentieth-Century English Poetry London: Cambridge University Press
- James, B. Ll. (1993) The Ancestry of Edward Thomas in the National Library of Wales Journal, vol 28, no 1 pp81–93
- John, A.V. (2015) The Actors' Crucible: Port Talbot and the Making of Burton, Hopkins, Sheen and all the Others, Cardigan: Parthian
- Jones, S. R. (2009) The Literary Tradition of the Neath and Afan Valleys and Tir Iarll (Maesteg and Porthcawl), (M.Phil.), University of Swansea
- Rees, L. (2013) The Real Port Talbot, Bridgend: Seren
- Shaffer, E. S. (1998) Comparative Criticism: Literary Devolution: Writing in Scotland, Ireland, Wales and England, vol 19, London: Cambridge University Press
- Stephens, M. ed. (1986) The Oxford Companion to the Literature of Wales, Oxford: Oxford University Press.
- Stephens, M. ed. (1998) The New Companion to the Literature of Wales, Cardiff: University of Wales Press
- Stephens, M. ed. (2007) Poetry 1900-2000, Cardigan: Parthian Books
