= Mendelssohn Glee Club =

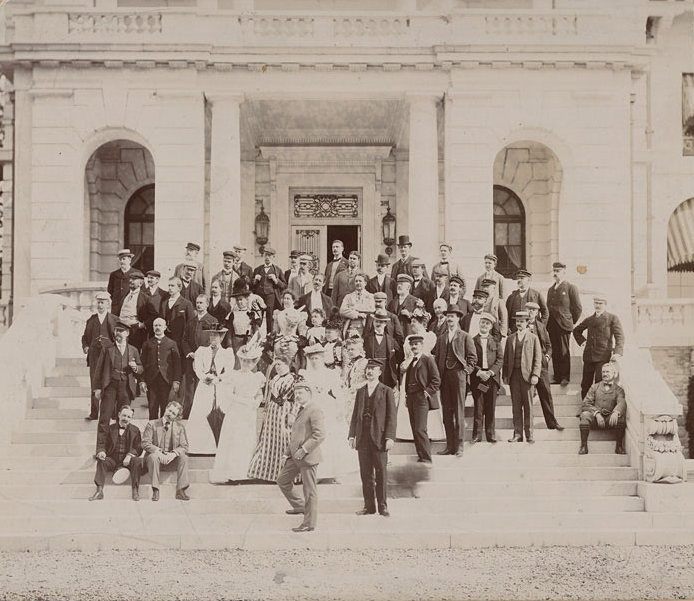
- The Mendelssohn Glee Club at the estate of Commodore Elias Cornelius Benedict in Greenwich, Connecticut, 1897

Background information
- Origin: New York City, New York
- Genre: Classical
- Years active: 1866–present
- Website: http://www.mgcnyc.org/

The Mendelssohn Glee Club of New York City, founded in 1866, is the oldest surviving independent musical group in the United States after the New York Philharmonic. Their concerts, given in very high-society settings, featured the new (to American ears) four-part arrangements (tenor, second tenor, baritone and bass) that the Club founders discovered when wealthy folk began to tour Europe during the expansionist boom brought about by the Civil War. In a format that was followed by the glee clubs that sprang up in other cities, the Mendelssohn Club presented artistic works from (initially mostly German) composers, mixed with 4-part renditions of sentimental and novelty pieces, to audiences of influential friends and relatives in pleasantly informal settings. In this way, the Club created an audience for classical music among the newly well-to-do where none had existed before, leading directly to the establishment of symphony orchestras and other classical music ensembles across the country

The Club's concerts were invitation-only affairs, and in its heyday it could take up to six years for new members to be admitted. In 1890, their performance so affected Alfred Corning Clark, the millionaire owner of Singer Sewing Machines and a former member who had joined in a duet with Nell Arthur, the wife of President Chester A. Arthur, in the Club's second concert, that he immediately commissioned the construction of the six-story Mendelssohn Hall on West 40th Street, close by the early home of the Metropolitan Opera. The Hall was designed by architect and member Robert Henderson Robertson and was completed in 1892. It featured an 1100-seat auditorium, rehearsal space, apartments, and two gigantic 30-foot long murals on canvas by the artist Robert Frederick Blum in the neo-classical style that characterized the Golden Age. Among the Club's tenants was the artist Winslow Homer, who once offered to sketch the club in payment for his back rent; he was turned down. The Club was dispossessed in 1911 after Clark's widow died, and her heirs sought to make some money by leasing the building to the Kinemacolor Company of America, an early venture into color movies.

On February 12, 1916, on the golden anniversary of the Mendelssohn Glee Club and also that of the American Telephone and Telegraph Company, members and guests gathered in the auditorium of the Waldorf Astoria in New York, where the Club sang to the members and guests of the Ellis Glee Club of Los Angeles, seated with telephone receivers held fast to their ears in the Biltmore Hotel, 3,000 miles of wire away. Singing to New York in their turn, the Ellis Club completed the world's first transcontinental concert, marking the dawn of the Electronic Age as the Golden Age faded away.

== Directors and members ==
The first significant conductor of the Mendelssohn Glee Club, Joseph Mosenthal, helped to popularize the group through his dramatic leadership and musical vision. Mosenthal, who served for 30 years and composed several ambitious works for the Club, exhausted himself getting to rehearsal during a snowstorm in January 1896 and died on a sofa in Mendelssohn Hall, directly beneath his portrait by John White Alexander. He was succeeded by the young Edward MacDowell, who had just returned to New York to found the School of Music at Columbia University. When MacDowell's career came to a tragic end in 1904 after being nearly killed by a hansom cab, the Club stepped in with benefit concerts and private donations that led to the founding of the MacDowell Colony for the Arts in Peterborough, New Hampshire, where the composer eventually succumbed. His place was taken by Walter Damrosch, of the famous New York musical family. During World War II the Club was led by Cesare Sodero, who was also the vocal director for Verdi operas at the Met. Sodero was followed by Emerson Buckley, who left to found the Fort Lauderdale Symphony and later to introduce Luciano Pavarotti to America. The noted basso John Royer Bogue led the Club through its centennial years. In 1966, the first concert of its 100th season was marked by the only time the great Blum murals have been displayed since Mendelssohn Hall was torn down. The baton was passed to the present director, Eugene Wisoff, in 1993.

Notable members have included tenor soloist Richard Crooks, baritone soloist and composer Oley Speaks, and operatic and concert basso Herbert Witherspoon. Members of the Met chorus commonly joined the Club as well. Among the young female soloists who have been part of the Club's performances ever since President Arthur's wife are some who went on to be Metropolitan Opera stars, like Licia Albanese, Aprile Millo, and Helen Traubel.

== Influence ==
The Mendelssohn Glee Club had a tremendous impact on American musical tastes, especially the appreciation of what we now call classical music among the upper class in the later 19th Century. A trip to Boston in 1871 resulted in the formation of the Apollo Club of Boston, leading soon after to the Boston Symphony Orchestra. In the same way, the Mendelssohn Club's visits initiated the Orpheus Club of Philadelphia, and from this the Philadelphia Orchestra. Other men's glee clubs on the Mendelssohn model sprang up across the country, creating a lasting heritage of participation in serious music by men who simply love to sing.
