= Alice Bartlett =

Alice Bartlett may refer to:

- Alice E. Bartlett (1848–1920), American author
- Alice Hunt Bartlett (1870–1949), British editor, poet, socialite and writer
