= Bach, Beethoven, and Brahms Society =

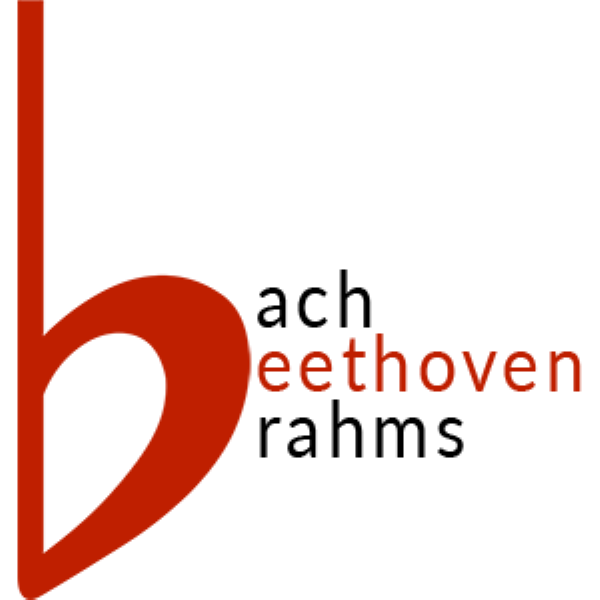

Background information
- Genres: American orchestra
- Years active: 2016–present
- Website: www.bbbsociety.org

The Bach, Beethoven, and Brahms Society is an American orchestra based in Boston, Massachusetts. Known colloquially as 'BB&B'.

== History ==
The Bach, Beethoven, & Brahms Society was formed in the spring of 2016 by Steven Lipsitt and the musicians of the former Boston Classical Orchestra (BCO). Following debut concerts in March and April 2016, BB&B presented a full 2016 – 2017 season of subscription concerts. Relying on the professional musicians of the former BCO, and guest soloists, BB&B continued the concerts in Faneuil Hall, home to the BCO for many years.

== Artistic leadership ==
Steven Lipsitt has been the musical director of the BB&B since its founding. Prior to that he had been the conductor of the BCO. The BCO was founded in 1980 by Robert Brink; Harry Ellis Dickson was the conductor of the BCO from 1983 to 1999.
