= Mosenthal =

Mosenthal is a surname. Notable people with the surname include:

- Joseph Mosenthal (1834–1896), German-American musician
- Salomon Hermann Mosenthal (1821–1877), writer, dramatist, and poet
