= Alison Fell =

Scottish writer, born 1944

- Born: 1944; Dumfries
- Education: Edinburgh College of Art, Dumfries Academy
- Occupations: Poet; novelist; journalist; children's writer; writer

Alison Fell (born 1944 in Dumfries, Scotland) is a Scottish poet and novelist with a particular interest in women's roles and political victims. Her poems have appeared in many anthologies. Her children's books also pass on social messages.

== Life and work ==
Alison Fell was educated at Dumfries Academy and Edinburgh Art College, from which she graduated as a sculptor. She began writing for Scotland Magazine in 1962. In 1967 she married a Leeds University academic and bore a son. By 1970 she had separated and she moved to London, where she co-founded the Woman's Street Theatre Group (later the Monstrous Regiment). An account of the company and Fell's life at this period appears in Michèle Roberts's memoir Paper Houses.

She worked at the underground newspaper Ink, and contributed to Spare Rib.

Fell's poems "speak for women, activists and political victims" and have been much anthologized. Her children's books Grey Dancer (1981) and The Bad Box (1987) "deal with growing up in left-wing working-class families." Kisses for Mayakovsky (1984) is a volume of them, and Every Move You Make, published in the same year, is an autobiographical novel. She also contributed about herself in Truth, Dare or Promise: Girls Growing up in the Fifties (1985, edited by Liz Heron).

In addition to her output of poetry and fiction, she held the School of English and American Studies Writing Fellowship at the University of East Anglia in 1998.

== Awards ==
- 1984: Alice Hunt Bartlett Prize for Kisses for Mayakovsky
- 1991: Boardman Tasker Prize for Mountain Literature for Mer de Glace
- 2002–2003: Royal Literary Fund Fellowship

== Works ==
=== Poetry ===
- Smile, Smile, Smile, Smile. Sheba. 1980. ISBN 978-0-907179-03-0.
- Kisses for Mayakovsky. Virago. 1984. ISBN 978-0-86068-593-7.
- The Crystal Owl. Methuen Paperback. 1988. ISBN 978-0-413-18810-6.
- Dreams, Like Heretics: New and Selected Poems. Serpent's Tail. 1997. ISBN 978-1-85242-561-6.
- August 6, 1945.

=== Novels ===
- The Grey Dancer. Collins. 1981. ISBN 978-0-00184-267-0.
- Every Move You Make. Virago. 1984. ISBN 978-0-86068-585-2.
- The Bad Box. Virago. 1987. ISBN 978-0-86068-497-8.
- Mer de Glace. Serpent's Tail. 1992. ISBN 978-1-85242-267-7.
- The Pillow Boy of the Lady Onogoro. Harcourt Brace. 1996. ISBN 978-0-15-100186-6.
- Fell, Alison (1999). The Mistress of Lilliput. ISBN 978-1-86230-048-4.
- Tricks of the light. Doubleday. 2003. ISBN 978-0-385-60508-3.
- The Element -Inth in Greek. Sandstone Press Ltd. 2012. ISBN 978-1-90-873702-1.

=== Anthology ===
- Licking the Bed Clean: Five Feminist Poets. Teeth imprints. 1978. ISBN 978-0-9506390-0-0.

=== Editor ===
- The Seven Deadly Sins. Illustrator Amanda Faulkner. Serpent's Tail. 1989. ISBN 978-1-85242-140-3.
- The Seven Cardinal Virtues. Illustrator Grizelda Holderness. Serpent's Tail. 1990. ISBN 978-1-85242-169-4.
- Serious Hysterics. Serpent's Tail. 1992. ISBN 978-1-85242-222-6.
