= Thomas F. Glick =

American academic (born 1939)

Thomas F. Glick (born January 28, 1939) is an American academic who taught in the departments of history and gastronomy at Boston University from 1972 to 2012. He served as the history department's chairperson from 1984 to 1989, and again from 1994 to 1995. He has also been the director of the Institute for Medieval History at Boston University since 1998.

Dr. Glick's course offerings for the history department covered the topics of medieval Spain, medieval science and medieval technology, and the history of modern science. For the gastronomy department he taught a number of classes, including "Readings in Food History" and "Readings in Wine History," and has designed a class on using cookbooks as primary resources. He is currently in the spring of 2002 the director of the Shtetl Economic History Project and is a corresponding member of Reial Acadèmia de Bones Lletres de Barcelona, an honorary member of Sociedad Mexicana de Historia de la Ciencia, and holds membership in the History of Science Society, the Society for the History of Technology, Sociedad Española de Historia de la Ciencia, Societat Catalana d'Història de la Ciència, and the Society for the Preservation of Old Mills. He has also authored numerous works pertaining to Spain, medieval history, Darwinism and other subjects.

== Education ==
Glick attained his B.A. in history and science from Harvard University in 1960. In 1960-61, he studied Arabic and Hebrew at the University of Barcelona, with Josep Millas i Vallicrosa and Joan Vernet. He then earned an M.A. in Arabic from Columbia University in 1963. He completed his Ph.D. in history at Harvard University in 1968.

== Teaching history ==
Prior to teaching at Boston University, Glick was an assistant professor of history at the University of Texas from 1968 to 1971, and then was promoted to associate professor from 1971 to 1972. He moved on to Boston University in 1972, teaching history and geography. In 1979 he was promoted to professor, which he still holds.

In 2005, he was appointed professor in the gastronomy program at Boston University Metropolitan College, where he teaches food history. In addition to teaching at Boston University, Glick has been visiting professor of the history of science at the University of Valencia and visiting professor of the history of technology at Polytechnic University of Valencia in the spring of 1980. During April–May 1988 and April–May 1990, he was a Fulbright senior lecturer at the University of the Republic, Montevideo in Uruguay.

== Selected publications ==
- Irrigation and Society in Medieval Valencia. Cambridge, Mass., Harvard University Press, 1970. Spanish version: Regadío y sociedad en la Valencia medieval. Valencia, Del Cenia al Segura, 1988.
- The Old World Background of the Irrigation System of San Antonio, Texas. El Paso, Texas Western Press, 1972. Spanish version, in Los cuadernos de Cauce 2000, No.15 (Madrid, 1988); also in Instituto de la Ingeniería de España, Obras hidráulicas prehispánicas y coloniales en América, I (Madrid, 1992), pp. 225–264.
- Darwinism in Texas. Austin, Humanities Research Center, 1972.
- The Comparative Reception of Darwinism. Austin, University of Texas Press, 1974. 2nd ed., Chicago, University of Chicago Press, 1988.
- Islamic and Christian Spain in the Early Middle Ages: Comparative Perspectives on Social and Cultural Formation. Princeton, Princeton University Press, 1979. Spanish version, (Madrid, Alianza, 1991) reissued as no. 67 in the collection "Grandes Obras de Historia" Madrid, (Altaya, 1997); chapters 7-10: Tecnología, ciencia y cultura en la España medieval (Madrid, Alianza, 1992).
- Darwin en España. Barcelona, Ediciones Península, 1982.
- Diccionario Histórico de la Ciencia Moderna en España. 2 Vols. Barcelona, Península, 1983 (with J. M. López Piñero).
- La España posible de la Segunda República: La oferta a Einstein de una cátedra extraordinaria en la Universidad Central (Madrid 1933). Madrid, Editorial de la Universidad Complutense, 1983 (with J. M. Sánchez Ron)
- Emilio Herrera, Flying: The Memoirs of a Spanish Aeronaut. Albuquerque, University of New Mexico Press, 1984. Spanish version: Memorias. Madrid, Ediciones de la Universidad Autónoma, 1988.
- Francesc Duran i Reynals (1899-1958). Barcelona, Ajuntament, 1986 (with A. Roca).
- Einstein y los españoles: Ciencia y sociedad en la España de entreguerras. Madrid, Alianza, 1986.
- The Comparative Reception of Relativity. Dordrecht, D. Reidel, 1987.
- Einstein in Spain: Relativity and the Recovery of Science. Princeton, Princeton University Press, 1988.
- Darwin y el darwinismo en el Uruguay y América Latina. Montevideo, Universidad de la República, 1989.
- George Sarton i la història de la ciència a Espanya. Barcelona, Consejo Superior de Investigaciones Científicas, 1990.
- Convivencia: Jews, Muslims, and Christians in Medieval Spain. New York, George Braziller, 1992 (with Vivian Mann and Jerrilyn Dodds).
- La Ley de Aduanas de 1888. Montevideo: Universidad de la República, 1992 (with J. P. Barrán and A. Cheroni).
- El Megaterio de Bru y el Presidente Jefferson. Valencia, Universitat de Valencia, 1993 (with J. M. López Piñero).
- From Muslim Fortress to Christian Castle: Social and Cultural Change in Medieval Spain. Manchester, University Press, 1995.
- Irrigation and Hydraulic Technology: Medieval Spain and its Legacy. Aldershot, Variorum,1996.
- (ed.) Charles Darwin, On Evolution. Indianapolis, Hackett, 1996 (with David Kohn).
- El darwinismo en España e Iberoamérica. Madrid, Doce Calles, 1999 (with Rosaura Ruiz and Miguel Angel Puig-Samper).
- Els molins hidràulics valencians: Tecnología, història i context social. Valencia, Instituciò Alfonso el Magnànim, 2000 (with Enric Guinot and Luis P. Martínez).
- The Reception of Darwinism in the Iberian World. Dordrecht, Kluwer, 2001 (with M. A.Puig-Samper and Rosaura Ruiz).
- The Literary and Cultural Reception of Charles Darwin in Europe. Bloomsbury Academic, 2014 (with Elinor Shaffer).
