= Ernest Ludvig Ipsen =

American painter (1869–1951)

Ernest L. Ipsen
- Born: September 5, 1869; Malden, Massachusetts, U.S.
- Died: November 2, 1951 (aged 82); Miami, Florida, U.S.
- Education: School of the Museum of Fine Arts, Boston; Royal Danish Academy of Fine Arts
- Known for: Painter; Portrait painter
- Movement: Impressionism
- Father: Ludvig Sandöe Ipsen
- Awards: Thomas R. Proctor Prize, National Academy of Design, 1921 Isaac N. Maynard Prize, National Academy of Design, 1929 Walter Lippincott Award, Pennsylvania Academy of the Fine Arts Annual Exhibition, 1937

Ernest L. Ipsen (1869-1951) was an American painter specializing in portraiture. He painted hundreds of portraits commissioned by institutions of government, education, religion, and commerce who wanted to commemorate their associates. His subjects include architect Cass Gilbert, General Robert E. Lee, statesman Elihu Root, publisher George Arthur Plimpton, actor Otis Skinner, politician Edith Nourse Rogers, and Chief Justice William Howard Taft. His portrait of Maurice Francis Egan, Minister to Denmark under three U.S. presidents, was presented to the King and Queen of Denmark. He also painted landscapes and seascapes, particularly along the New England coast.

== Early life and education ==
Ipsen was born September 5, 1869, in Malden, Massachusetts to Ludvig Sandöe Ipsen (1840–1920) and Emma Petrea Ipsen (née Petersen, 1846–1914). His father, an architect and designer, and his mother, a singer, were both natives of Copenhagen, Denmark. He studied at the School of the Museum of Fine Arts, Boston from 1884 to 1887, under the tutelage of portrait painter Frederic Porter Vinton, who may have influenced his choice to pursue portraiture. He continued his training at the Royal Danish Academy of Fine Arts (where his father had studied architecture) from 1887 to 1891. His instructors there included Carl Bloch. He won a prize for figure studies and a scholarship in life painting.

== Career ==
Following his study in Copenhagen, Ipsen returned to Massachusetts, establishing a studio in Boston's Harcourt Studio building, where he remained from 1900 to 1904. Ipsen eventually moved to New York, where he established a studio on 19th Street. Ipsen would continue to work out of the National Arts Club Studio on 19th Street until 1934, when he moved to South Dartmouth, Massachusetts.

His work was widely praised for its "sincere, honest statements of personality" and he "would be the choice for a serious, carefully considered portrait without dash or technical bravura of any sort, whose very seriousness brings with it both charm of style and surface." (Note: This may be a subtle dig at Ipsen's contemporary, John Singer Sargent, whose work many considered rather flamboyant.)

== Personal life ==
On June 15, 1908, Ipsen married Edith Boyden Crocker of Brookline, Massachusetts. They had one daughter, Edith Valborg Ipsen, who was born on April 11, 1909, and died three days later. At the time they were living in Boston's Fenway Studios where Ipsen had moved after the Harcourt Studios building burned down in 1904, destroying not only his home but also paintings stored there. The Ipsens spent winters in Boston and later, New York, and summers at a home they bought in Nonquitt, a section of South Dartmouth on the Massachusetts coast. After an automobile accident in 1938 which seriously impaired Mrs. Ipsen's health, they sold the Nonquitt property and moved to Coconut Grove, Florida, although they still returned north, to New Brunswick, Canada, in the summer.

Edith Ipsen died on January 20, 1948. Ernest Ipsen continued to paint his friends and neighbors, lecture and exhibit locally in Florida until his death in 1951. They are interred at the Walnut Hills Cemetery in Brookline.

== Gallery ==
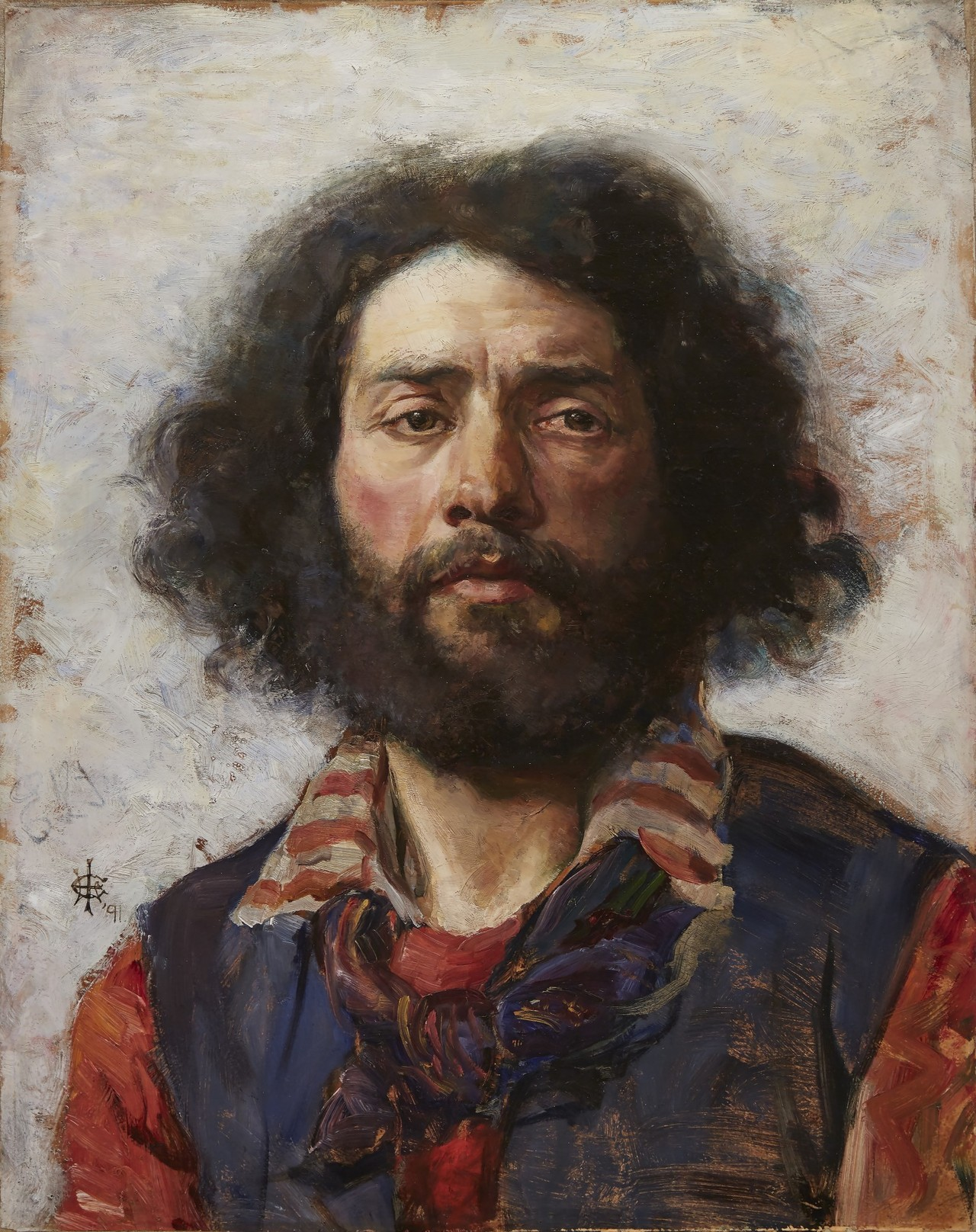
Pierre Félix Masseau, 1891

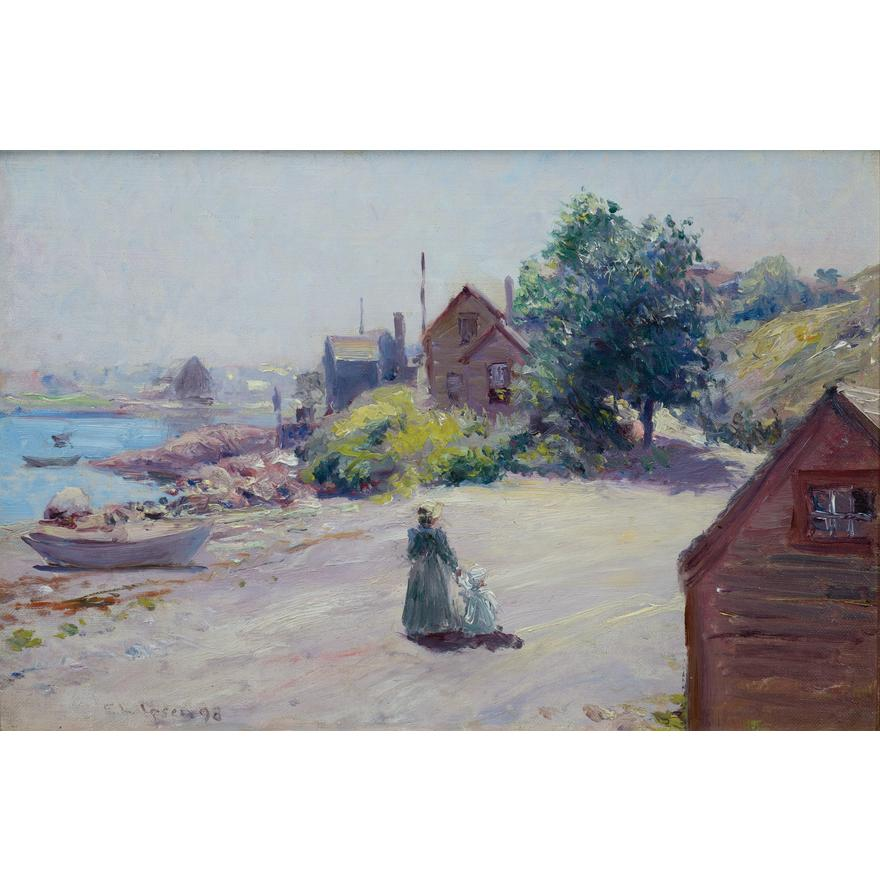
Marblehead, Massachusetts, 1898

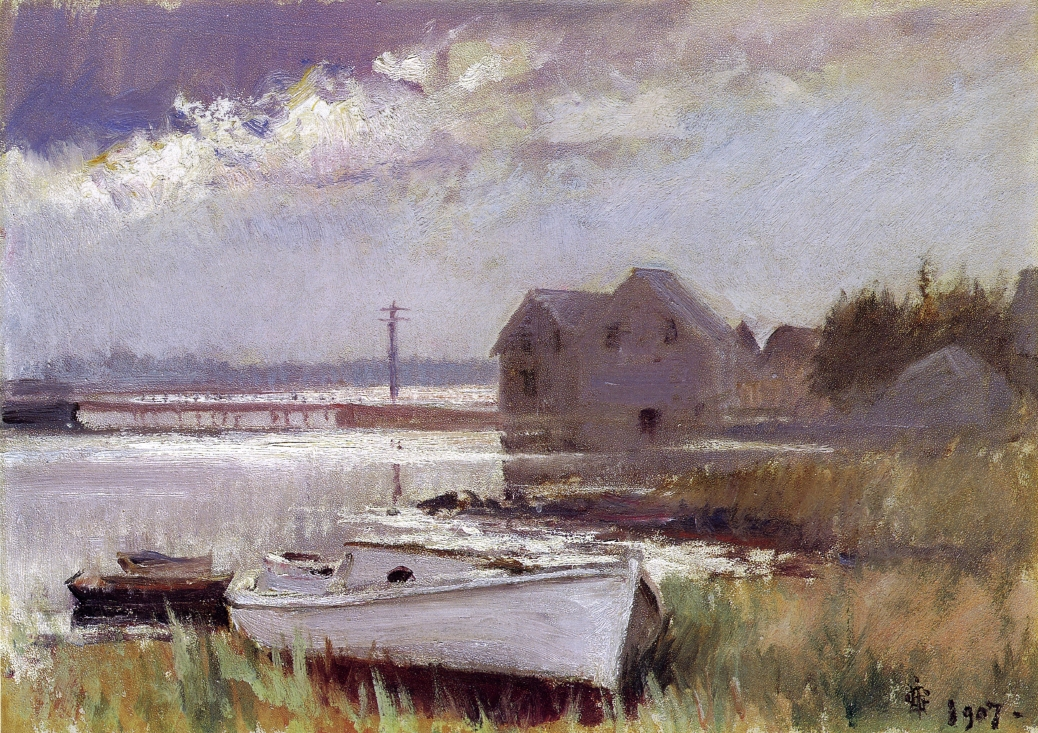
South Dartmouth landscape, 1907

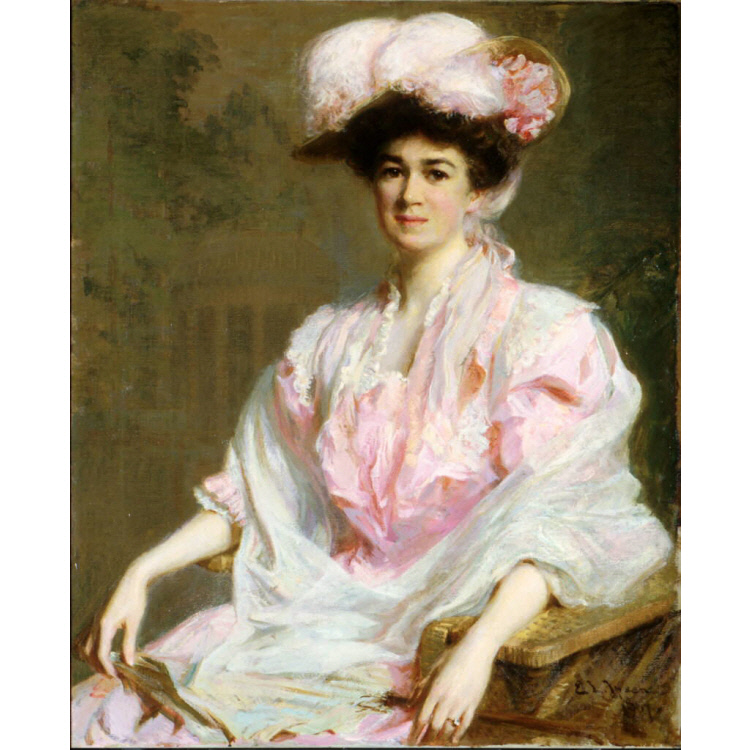
Edith Nourse Rogers, 1909

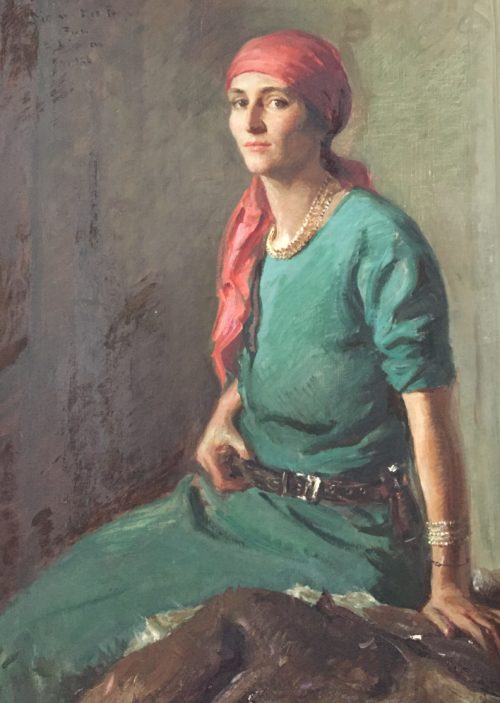
Lucy Carnegie Ferguson, c.1920

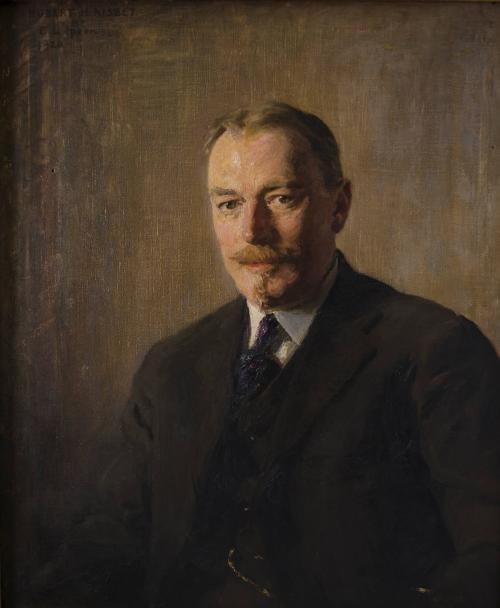
Robert H. Nisbet, 1920

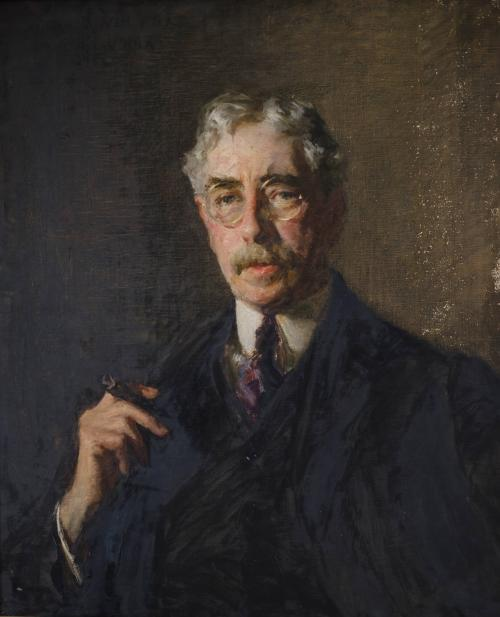
William G. Watt, 1923

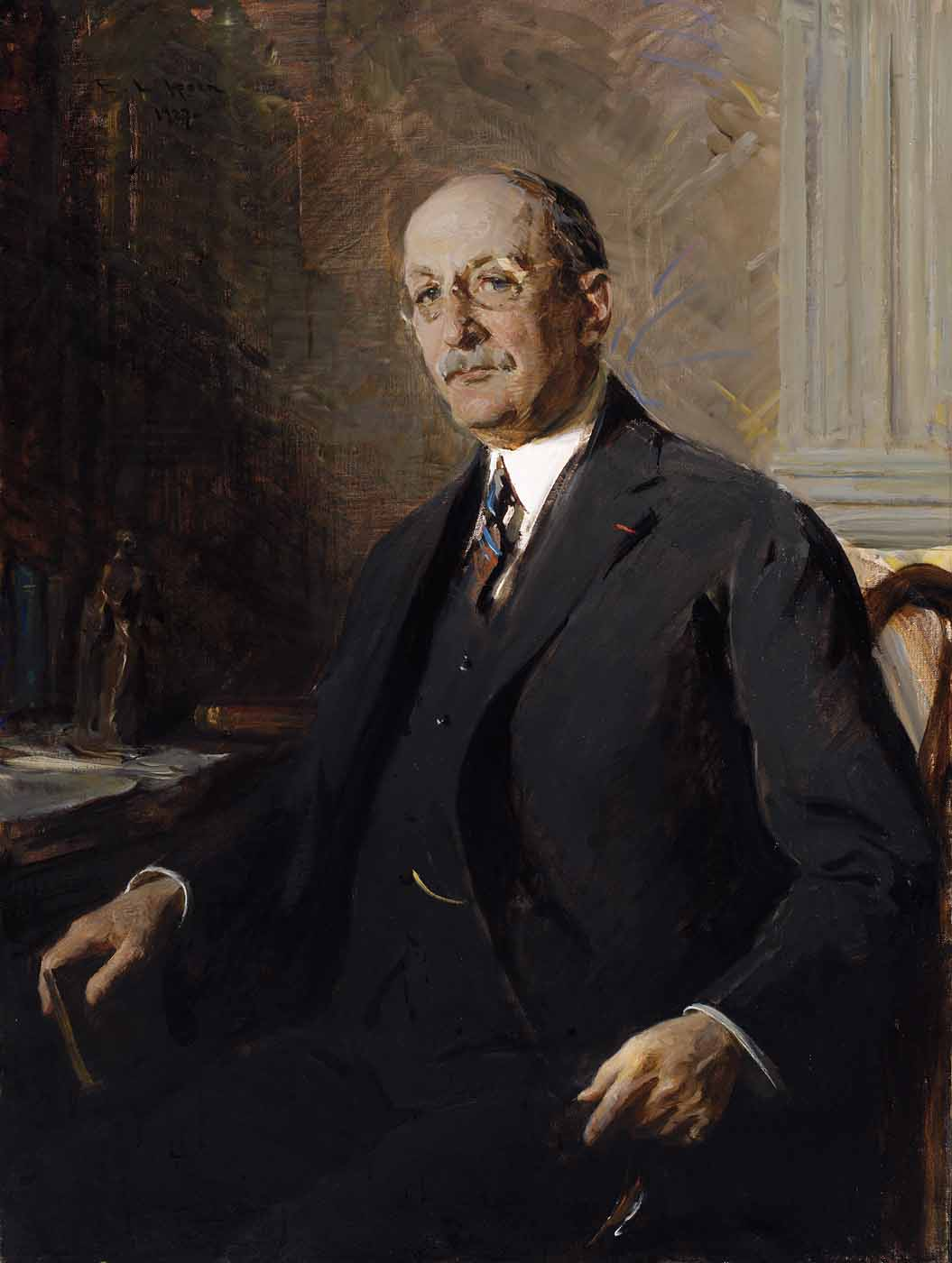
Cass Gilbert, 1927

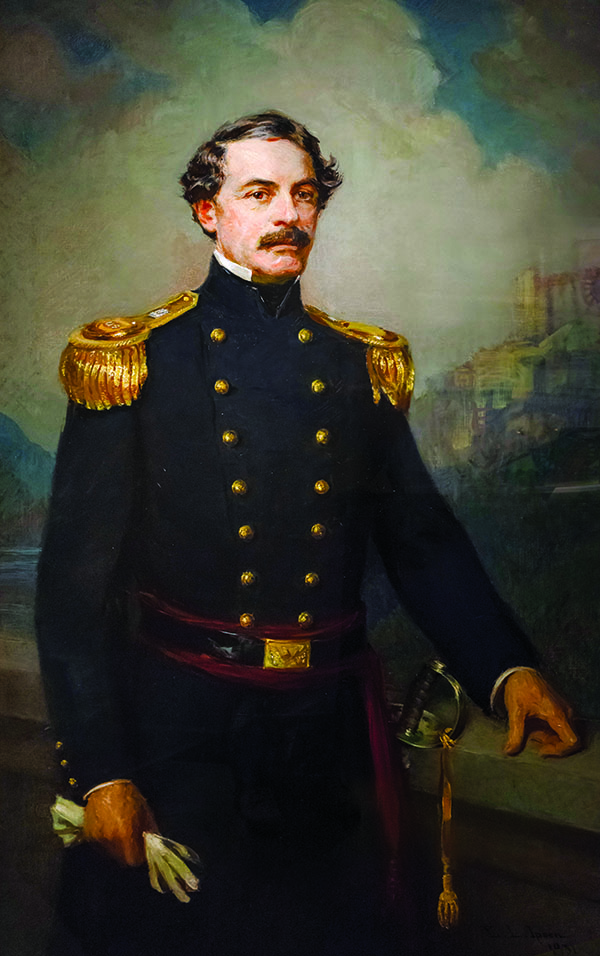
Robert E. Lee, 1931

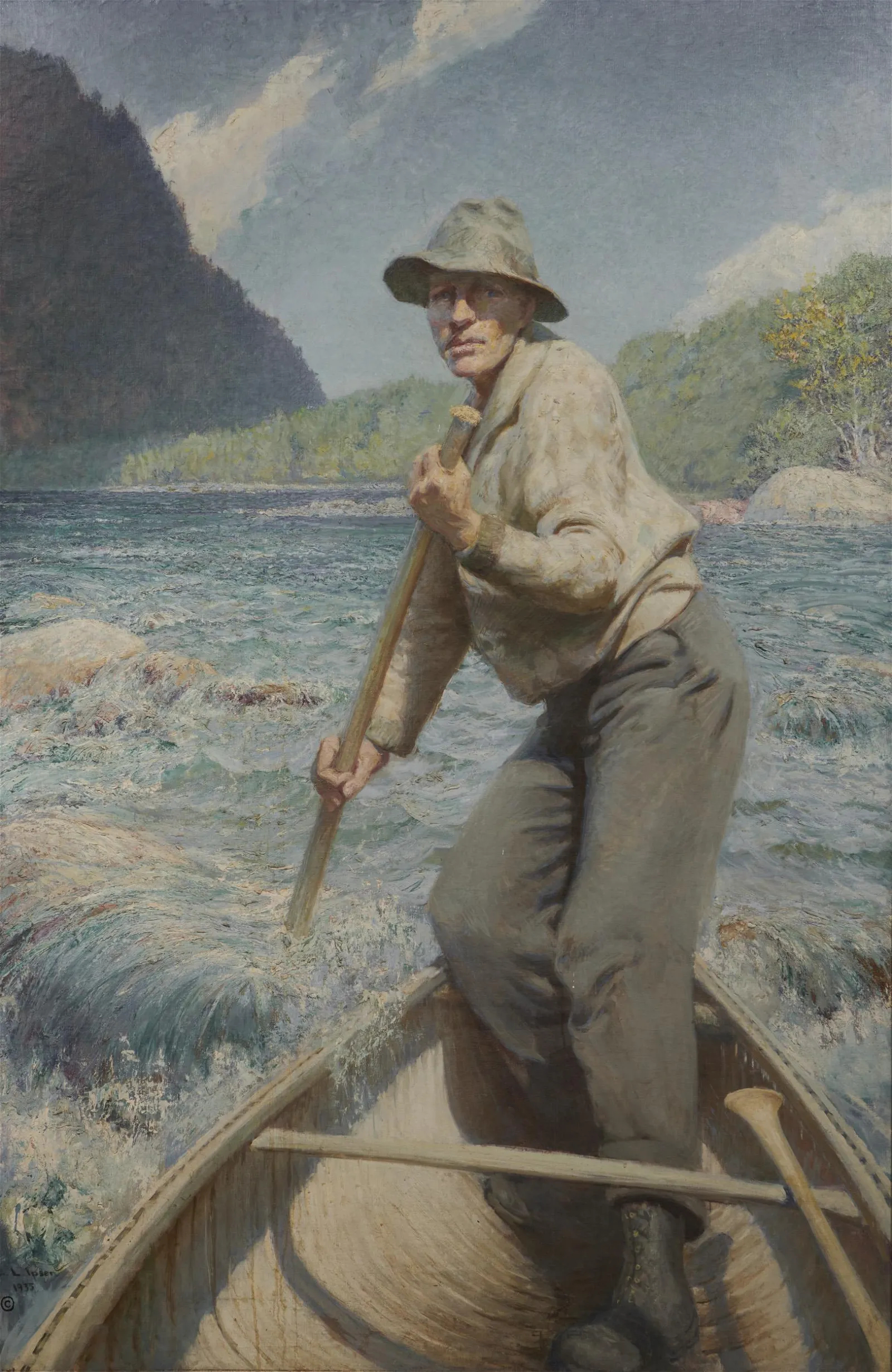
The Artists Guide, Maine, 1935

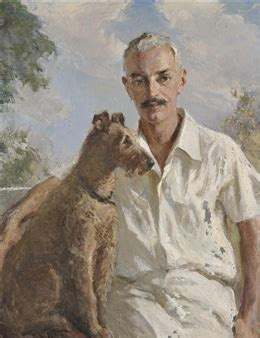
Milton H. Bird with his champion Irish Terrier Kelvin Colleen, 1943
