= Herman O. Mosenthal =

American physician and diabetologist

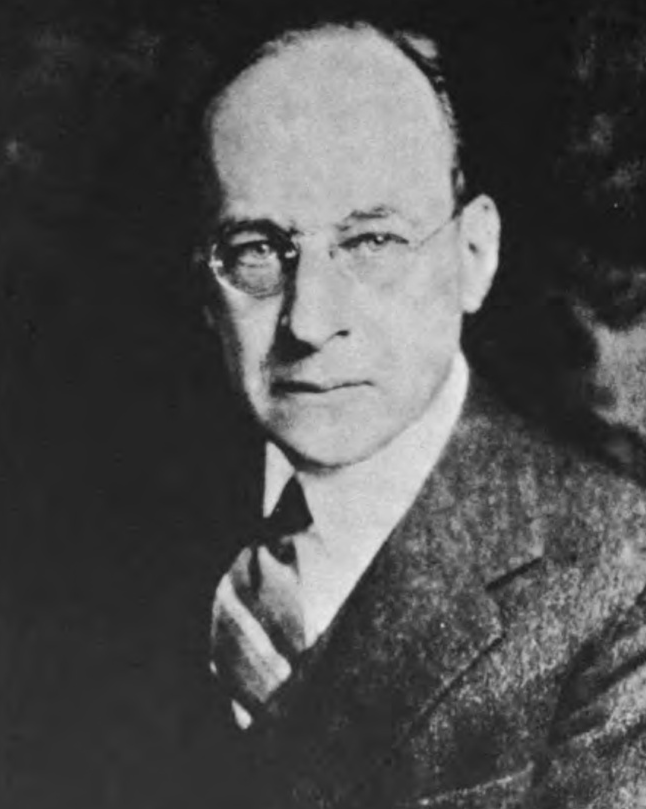
- Born: July 8, 1878; New York City
- Died: April 24, 1954 (aged 75); New York City
- Education: Columbia University
- Occupations: Physician, diabetologist
- Spouse: Johanna Kroeber Mosenthal

Herman Otto Mosenthal (July 8, 1878 – April 24, 1954) was an American physician and diabetologist.

== Biography ==
Mosenthal was born in New York City on 8 July 1878. His father, Joseph Mosenthal, was a musician who migrated to the United States from Kassel in 1853. Mosenthal graduated A.B. from Columbia College in 1899 and studied at the Columbia University Vagelos College of Physicians and Surgeons where he obtained his M.D. in 1903. He was attending physician at Seton Hospital (1908–1910) and attending physician to the outpatient department at New York Hospital.

Mosenthal was instructor at the Department of Biological Chemistry at Columbia's College of Physicians and Surgeons (1908–1914). He was attending physician in Diseases of Metabolism at Vanderbilt Clinic and assistant visiting physician to the Presbyterian Hospital of New York City in 1910. In 1914, Mosenthal joined Johns Hopkins Medical School as associate professor of medicine. The Mosenthal test to evaluate renal concentrating ability was introduced by Mosenthal in 1915. The test involves urine specimens being measured through a twenty-four hour period of controlled dietary intake. In 1917, Theodore Caldwell Janeway left for service during World War I making Mosenthal Acting Professor of Medicine at Johns Hopkins until 1918.

He became Professor of Medicine and Chief of the Department of Medicine of the New York Post-Graduate Medical School and Hospital until 1935. He established the first U.S. metabolic clinic at the Post-Graduate Hospital. In 1940, Mosenthal was made Honorary Consulting Physician to the Division of Metabolism at New York Post-Graduate Medical School and Hospital. He was Clinical Professor of Medicine at Columbia University (1934–1947) and Associate Clinical Professor of Medicine at the New York Medical College (1946–1951).

Mosenthal was a founder and first President of the New York Diabetes Association in 1935 and second President of the American Diabetes Association (1941–1942). He was a Fellow of the American College of Physicians and the New York Academy of Medicine. He was a member of the Association of American Physicians and the American Gastroenterological Association.

== Selected publications ==
- Diabetes Mellitus: A System of Diets (1921)
- The Diagnosis and Treatment of Variations in Blood Pressure and Nephritis (1931)
