= Anna Brown =

Anna Brown may refer to:

- Anna J. Brown (born 1952), United States District Judge
- Anna Robeson Brown (1873–1941), American writer
- Anna Easter Brown (1879–1957), part of the original nine group of twenty founders in Alpha Kappa Alpha sorority
- Anna L. Brown (died 1924), Canadian-born American physician
- Anna V. Brown (1914–1985), African American advocate for the elderly
- Anna Brown (lawyer) (born 1979), Australian lawyer and activist
- Anna Gordon (1747–1810), also known as Mrs Brown, British ballad collector

== See also ==
- Anne Brown (disambiguation)
