= Tison Street =

American classical composer (born 1943)

Tison C. Street aka Curry Tison Street (born May 20, 1943 in Boston, Massachusetts) is an American composer of contemporary classical music and violinist.

== Early life and education ==
Tison Street was born in Boston on 20 May 1943 to J. Curry Street and Leila Fripp Tison Street. After studying violin with Einar Hansen of the Boston Symphony Orchestra from 1951 to 1959, he studied a composition with Leon Kirchner and David Del Tredici at Harvard University, where he received his B.A. in 1965 and M.A. in 1971.

== Career ==
As a violinist, Street has performed with Alea III, the Boston Classical Orchestra, the Boston Pops Esplanade Orchestra, the Harvard Chamber Orchestra, and the Boston Ballet Orchestra. He performed the violin parts for Philip Glass's Einstein on the Beach in its 1984 revival. His compositions have been performed by the New York Philharmonic, Los Angeles Philharmonic, the American Composers Orchestra, the Saint Paul Chamber Orchestra, the New Hampshire Symphony Orchestra, the North Carolina Symphony, and the Boston Classical Orchestra, as well as soloists such as Peter Serkin and Ani Kavafian. His works are published by G. Schirmer. In 1993, the New York Philharmonic commissioned Bright Sambas for their 150th anniversary celebration. He has also taught at Harvard (1979–1983), the University of California, Berkeley, Boston University, and Amherst College (2008).

Among his awards and honors are the Rome Prize (1973), Guggenheim Fellowship (1981), Kennedy Center Friedheim Award (1994, for his orchestral work Bright Sambas), Naumberg Recording Award, an American Academy and Institute of Arts and Letters Award, an NEA grant, and the Brandeis University Creative Arts Award.
