= Benjamin Johnson Lang =

American conductor and pianist (1837–1909)

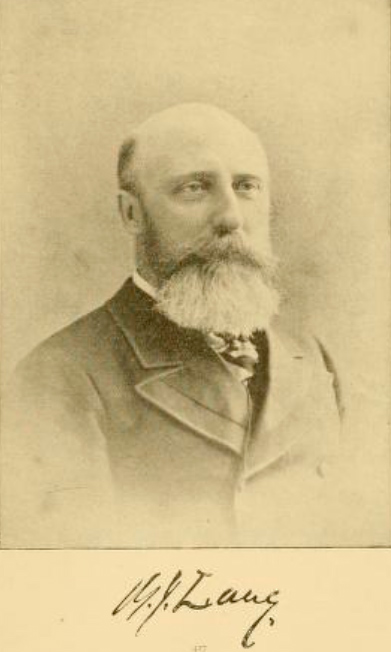
Lang in 1889

Benjamin Johnson Lang (December 28, 1837 – April 3 or 4, 1909) was an American conductor, pianist, organist, teacher and composer. He introduced a large amount of music to American audiences, including the world premiere of Pyotr Ilyich Tchaikovsky's Piano Concerto No. 1, which he conducted in Boston in 1875. His daughter Margaret Ruthven Lang was an accomplished composer.

== Biography ==
Benjamin Johnson Lang was born in Salem, Massachusetts, the son of a piano maker, music teacher and organist. By age 12, he was showing sufficient promise as a pianist to play Chopin's Ballade No. 3 in A flat. He began organ lessons at 12, and by 18 he was the organist of the largest instrument in Boston, the First Baptist Church on Somerset Street. He excelled in improvisation. In 1852, he took over his father's organ teaching business. In 1855, he went to Europe to study in Berlin and elsewhere. He studied mainly under Alfred Jaëll, but also had some instruction from Franz Liszt. He had a lasting friendship with both Liszt and his daughter Cosima. He made his first public appearance as a pianist 1858, in Boston, where he spent the remainder of his life. That year he played the piano in the first Boston performance of Beethoven's Piano Trio in C minor, Op. 1, No. 3, with the Mendelssohn Quintette Club. From 1860 to 1870, Lang built a piano and organ teaching career of great success; he was considered a very thorough teacher and his pupils included William F. Apthorp, Arthur Foote, Ethelbert Nevin, Carrie Burpee Shaw, and his own children, Margaret, Malcolm and Rosamond. His debut as a conductor was on May 3, 1862, when he gave Boston's first performance with orchestra of Mendelssohn's Die erste Walpurgisnacht, which he presented twice in the same concert.

Louis Moreau Gottschalk was so impressed with Lang's piano playing that he hired him as a collaborator for a series of twenty concerts in which compositions for two pianos were featured.

On January 1, 1863, along with Carl Zerrahn, he conducted the jubilee concert in honour of Abraham Lincoln's Emancipation Proclamation. The concert was attended by Ralph Waldo Emerson, who read one of his poems. From then on he appeared in public more often as a conductor than as a pianist. He was the founding conductor the Apollo Club, a men's singing society, from 1871 to 1901. He was also the conductor of Caecilia, a mixed voice choir, and of the Handel and Haydn Society from 1895 to 97.

Lang visited Richard Wagner (who was now married to Liszt's daughter Cosima) at Tribschen and Bayreuth in 1871 and offered his assistance in publicizing the Bayreuth Festival in America. In 1876, he and his wife were honored guests at the first performance of the Ring Cycle in Bayreuth. He later introduced many of Wagner's works to America.

He is perhaps best remembered now for being the conductor of the world premiere of the original version of Pyotr Ilyich Tchaikovsky's Piano Concerto No. 1, with Hans von Bülow (Cosima's former husband) as soloist, on October 25, 1875. Bülow had initially engaged a different conductor, but quarrelled with him, and Lang was brought in at short notice. George Whitefield Chadwick, who attended the performance, recalled in a memoir years later: "They had not rehearsed much and the trombones got in wrong in the ‘tutti' in the middle of the first movement, whereupon Bülow sang out in a perfectly audible voice, The brass may go to hell". Lang himself appeared as soloist in a performance of the concerto with the Boston Symphony Orchestra on February 20, 1885.

Other first performances he conducted were:

- On the William Shakespeare tercentennial, April 23, 1864, Lang conducted the first Boston performance of Mendelssohn's complete music to A Midsummer Night's Dream, and, soon after, the first complete Boston performance of Haydn's The Seasons.
- The first U.S. performance of Brahms's German Requiem, with the Caecilia Society (December 3, 1888
- The first U.S. performance of Samuel Coleridge-Taylor's Hiawatha's Wedding Feast (1900)
- With the Apollo Club he gave the first Boston performances of (among others) Brahms' Rinaldo, Grieg's Discovery, Mendelssohn's Sons of Art, Antigone, and Oedipus, and several premieres by the Boston composers Chadwick, Foote (Farewell of Hiawatha), Thayer, and Whiting (March of the Monks of Bangor, Free Lances, and Henry of Navarre)
- the first Boston performance of Niels Gade's Crusaders (January 11, 1877).

With his experience and credentials, it surprised many that Lang was not named conductor of the newly formed Boston Symphony Orchestra (BSO). However, Lang appeared as a pianist in twelve concerts during the first years of the orchestra. On December 9, 1876, he was the soloist in the first U.S. performance of Saint-Saëns' Piano Concerto No. 2 in G minor with Leopold Damrosch conducting. With the Harvard Musical Association, he played "all the great concertos, many of them for the first time in Boston".

In 1888, Lang became organist of King's Chapel, and remained there until his death in 1909. It was Lang who in 1888 encouraged Edward MacDowell to resettle in Boston, then the centre of concert life in America. The Lang home entertained prominent guests such as Antonín Dvořák and Ignacy Jan Paderewski.

In 1891, at great personal expense he brought the entire New York Metropolitan Opera House Orchestra to Boston to present the first performance in Boston of Wagner's Parsifal, conducted by Anton Seidl, who had assisted Wagner in the first complete performance of the Ring in 1876 and who in 1889 he led the first complete Ring in America.

His compositions included symphonies, overtures, an oratorio David, chamber pieces, piano pieces and songs. Most of these were performed, however the only published work was by Chadwick who used a "melodic motive" of Lang's in the first of his "Drei Walzer fur das Pianoforte". He destroyed all his other manuscripts. In 1903, Yale University conferred on him the degree of Master of Arts.

His last appearance as a conductor was on February 12, 1909, when he conducted the BSO and a chorus for a commemoration of the centenary of the birth of Abraham Lincoln. He presented Mendelssohn's Lobgesang ("Hymn of Praise"), which he had also conducted at the Emancipation Jubilee concert in 1862. He died only a few weeks later, on April 3 or 4, in Boston. His estate was valued at over $600,000, an enormous amount for that time. His bequests included a silver box containing Liszt's hair, which he left to his daughter Margaret.

== Family life ==
In 1861, he married Frances Morse Burrage (1839–1934). Although she never became a professional, she was well regarded as a singer. Their three children inherited their musical aptitudes: Margaret Ruthven Lang (1867–1972), a composer; Rosamond (1878–1971), a pianist; and Malcolm (1881–1972), a pianist and organist.

Many of Margaret's works were presented at concerts under her father's baton. Her Dramatic Overture, Op. 12, was the first work by a woman played by a major American symphony orchestra (BSO, 1893, Arthur Nikisch).
