= Annie Brown (disambiguation) =

Annie Brown (1843–1926) was the 15th child of abolitionist John Brown.

Annie Brown may also refer to:

- Annie Brown Kennedy (1924–2023), American politician and attorney
- Annie Florence Brown (1873–1945), American community leader
- Annie Greene Brown (1855–1923), author
