= Joseph Mosenthal =

German-American musician

Joseph Mosenthal (30 November 1834 – 6 January 1896) was a German-American musician, born at Kassel. He studied under his father and Spohr and in 1853 went to America, where he played the organ in Calvary Church, New York City, from 1860 to 1887. He was conductor of the Mendelssohn Glee Club in New York City from 1867 to 1896, played a first violin in the Philharmonic Orchestra for 40 years, a second violin in the Mason and Thomas Quartet for 12, and composed much Church music, such as the psalm "The Earth is the Lord's", a setting of part of Psalm 145 (published in 1864), and part songs for male voices, Thanatopsis, Blest Pair of Sirens, and Music of the Sea. He died in New York City. His son was physician Herman O. Mosenthal.

Among Mosenthal's students was Carolyn Beebe, pianist and founder of the New York Chamber Music Society.
