= Elinor Shaffer =

British academic

Elinor Shaffer (born 1935) FBA is a professor at the School of Advanced Study, University of London, honorary professor at University College, London, editor of the Comparative Literature series of Legenda (imprint), and editor of Reception of British and Irish Authors in Europe, a book series published by Continuum Books.

She is also UK director of the British Academy Network on Reception Studies and a Distinguished Fellow of the European Humanities Research Centre, Oxford. She was educated at St Hilda's College, Oxford, from which she holds the degree of B.A. (Hons) in English Language and Literature, and M.A., and Columbia University, where she was awarded a Ph.D. in English and Comparative Literature. Shaffer has held positions at the University of California, Berkeley, Clare Hall, Cambridge and the University of East Anglia. Visiting Professorships have taken her, among other places, to Brown University, Stanford University (USA), Freie Universität Berlin, and to Zurich and Stockholm.

She was elected to be a Fellow of the British Academy in 1995 and awarded an honorary doctorate by the University of Bucharest in 2013.

== Selected works ==
- E. S. Shaffer (1975). 'Kubla Khan' and The Fall of Jerusalem: The Mythological School in Biblical Criticism and Secular Literature 1770-1880. Cambridge University Press.
- E. S. Shaffer (1998). The third culture: Literature and Science. Walter de Gruyter. ISBN 3-11-014292-9.
- E. S. Shaffer; Thomas F. Glick (2014). The Literary and Cultural Reception of Charles Darwin in Europe. Bloomsbury Academic.
