= Robert Brink =

American violinist, conductor, and educator

Robert Greenleaf Brink (Boston, 30 March 1924 - Boston, 24 October 2014) was an American violinist, conductor, and educator. He was a professor of music at the New England Conservatory in Boston, Massachusetts.

He performed with the harpsichordist Daniel Pinkham and gave the premieres of works by Walter Piston, Henry Cowell, Alan Hovhaness, and Daniel Pinkham. Pinkham composed his 1958 violin concerto for Brink.

He performed in the United States, Canada, and Europe, and played under the conductors Sergei Koussevitzky, Aaron Copland, and Darius Milhaud. With Daniel Pinkham, Brink co-founded the Cambridge Festival Orchestra in the mid-1950s, serving as that orchestra's concertmaster. In 1951 and 1952, Brink and Pinkham performed at Brown University and Wellesley college under the auspices of the Peabody Mason Concerts. Brink founded the Boston Classical Orchestra and served as its concertmaster until 1995. He founded and conducted the Orchestra for the Art of Music (OAM), which performs music from the Classical period.

He lived for many years in Mattapoisett, Massachusetts.
