= Alice Hunt Bartlett =

Poet and socialite

Alice Hunt Bartlett (July 31, 1870, in Bennington, Vermont–1949) was an editor, poet, socialite and writer.

Her father was Seth B. Hunt, one of the founders of the anti-slavery magazine, The Independent. She went to Miss Anne Brown's School for Girls on Fifth Avenue and then married a medical doctor, William Bartlett, at the age of 23.

During the First World War, she organized and campaigned in support of the aviators who were part of the American Expeditionary Force. She was awarded a diploma of merit and honorary membership of the Aerial League of America.

After her husband died in the 1920s, she became interested in poetry. She started editing the American section of the Poetry Review in 1923 and, in the following year, won the gold medal of the Poetry Society of Great Britain. She organised a variety of poetry competitions and pageants including the George Washington bicentennial celebration in 1932 and the 1939 New York World's Fair.

== Works ==
- The Sea Anthology (1924)
- Fascism and Poetry (1929)
- Washington Pre-eminent (1931)
- Six Historic and Romantic Leaders who Visioned World Peace (1946)
