= Boston Classical Orchestra =

The Boston Classical Orchestra was a chamber orchestra based in Boston, Massachusetts. It was founded in 1980 by the violinist Robert Brink. The orchestra's music director was Steven Lipsitt. It performed at Faneuil Hall.

The orchestra has performed music by Tison Street.

The orchestra filed for bankruptcy in 2016 and canceled the last two concerts of that season.
