= Gustave Langenus =

Belgian musician

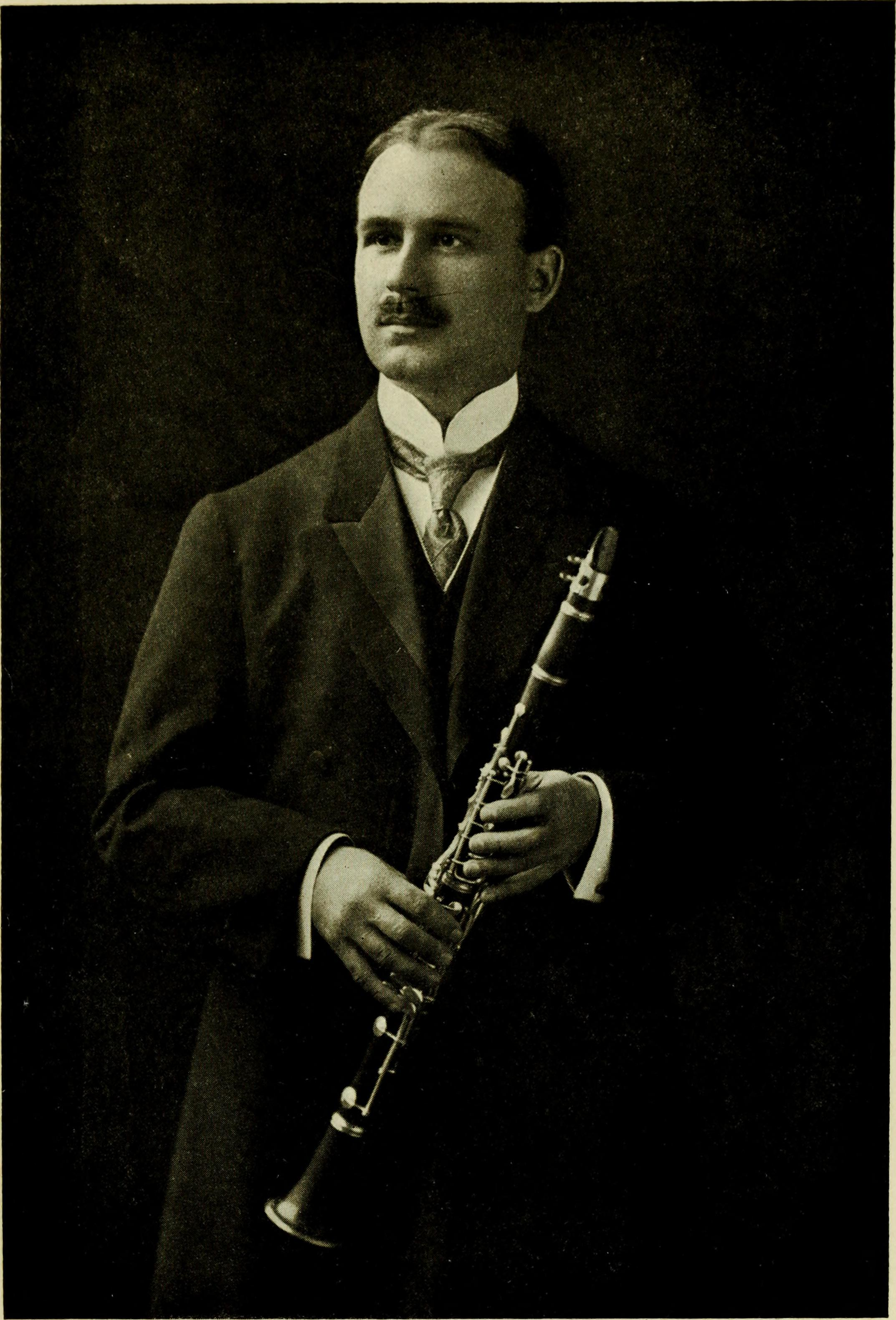
Gustav Langenus

Gustave Langenus (1883–1957) was a Belgian clarinetist. He is known for his mouthpiece design and 1913 method book, an important early pedagogical device for the Boehm system clarinet. He was principal clarinetist with the New York Symphony.
