= Apollo Club of Boston =

The Apollo Club of Boston, founded in 1871, is the second-oldest continuously active men's singing group in the United States.

Before the advent of radio, the club was a major source of entertainment for well-to-do Bostonians. In 1874, the Apollo Club sang at the funeral services of Massachusetts Senator Charles Sumner and received a note of appreciation from Henry Wadsworth Longfellow. In 1901, the club sang at President William McKinley's memorial service at Faneuil Hall. In 1924, when the George Francis Parkman Memorial Bandstand was dedicated on the Boston Common, 79 Apollo members sang to the accompaniment of the Boston Municipal Band.

In the 1940s, the club hosted a regular radio show, expanding its audience during the golden age of radio. More recently, the Apollo Club has been featured in commemorative events such as Pearl Harbor remembrance ceremonies at the Charlestown Navy Yard.

The Apollo Club has also performed the national anthems at Fenway Park for Boston Red Sox games against the Toronto Blue Jays, singing both the U.S. and Canadian anthems. These performances have become a recurring part of the club's modern engagements.

The Apollo Club has commissioned and performed significant works, including a setting of Paul Revere's Ride and other choral pieces by prominent composers. The club also shares historical ties with the Handel and Haydn Society.

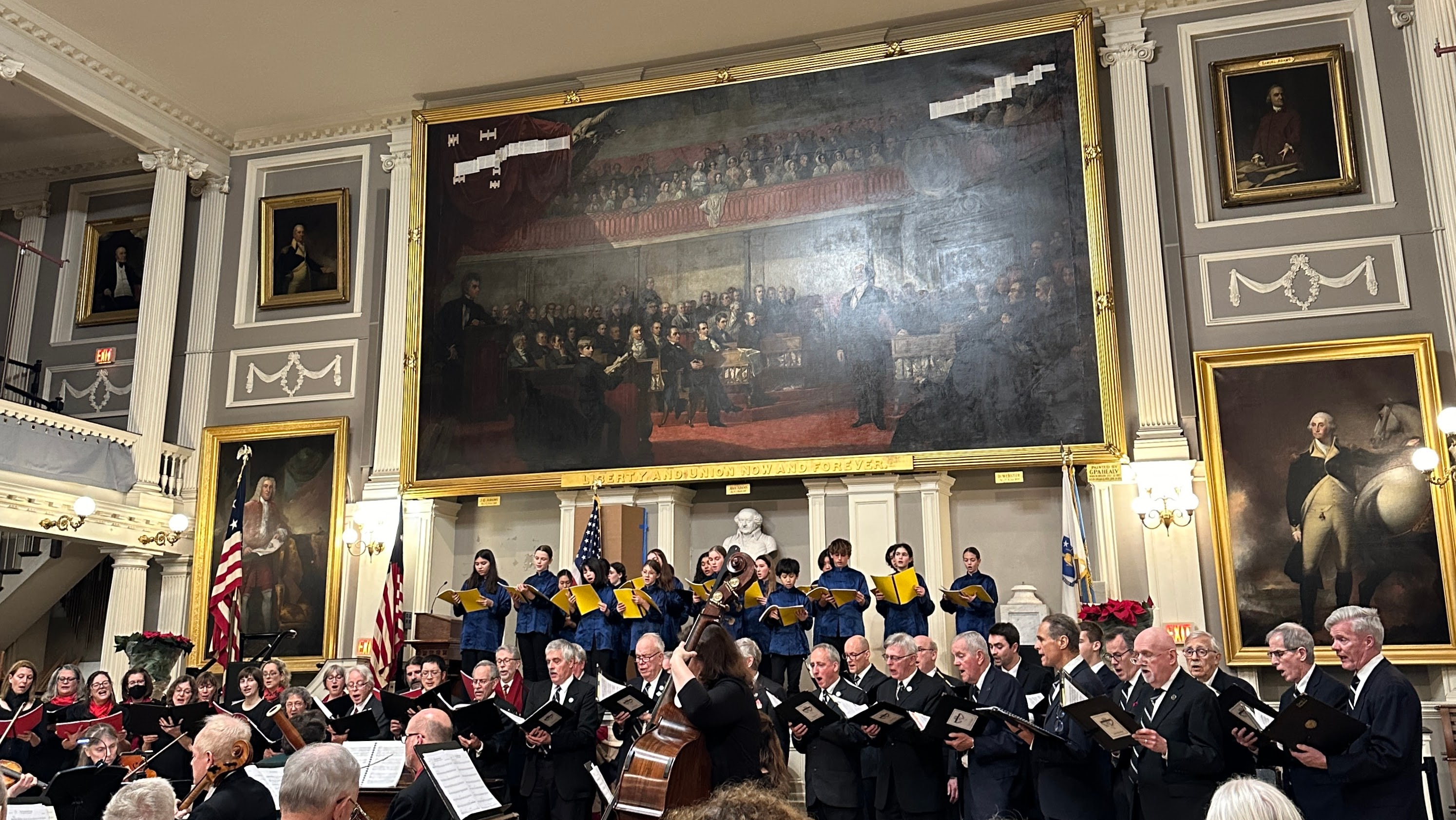
Apollo Club performing in Faneuil Hall with members of Bach, Beethoven, & Brahms Society, Heritage Chorale, and VOICES Boston Children's Choir

Today, the club has approximately 25 members and performs a varied repertoire of show tunes, sea shanties, patriotic, love, and folk songs at venues around the Boston area. The club is directed by Steven Lipsitt, former leader of the Yale Russian Chorus and Pitchpipe of the Whiffenpoofs, who also serves as music director of the Bach, Beethoven, and Brahms Society Orchestra. The club is accompanied by Mark Bartlett.
