= Anne Brown (educator) =

Teacher and principal

Miss Anne Brown (1854–1940) was a teacher and principal.

She was born in Toronto and graduated from Vassar College in 1874. She taught at the Rock Island Arsenal and then moved to New York where taught at Miss Chapman's school on 42nd Street. She then founded her own school on 56th Street. This was successful and moved to larger premises on Fifth Avenue where it taught fashionable young ladies. She established another school in Park Hill, Yonkers before retiring in 1906.
