= Language for a New Century =

2008 poetry anthology

Language for a New Century: Contemporary Poetry from the Middle East, Asia, and Beyond
- Editors: Tina Chang; Nathalie Handal; Ravi Shankar
- Language: English
- Published: 2008
- Publisher: W. W. Norton & Company
- Publication place: United States
- Pages: 784
- ISBN: 9780393332384
- OCLC: 263445189
- Dewey Decimal: 808.81

Language for a New Century: Contemporary Poetry from the Middle East, Asia, and Beyond is an anthology of works by South Asian, East Asian, Middle Eastern, and Central Asian poets edited by Tina Chang, Nathalie Handal and Ravi Shankar, published in 2008 by W. W. Norton & Company.

From the foreword, Carolyn Forché wrote, "Where else would we find poetry from a two-thousand-year-old Seal script, poetry written in the graphemic style of Sanskrit, as well as English versions of experimental poetry from the Marathi language." The poet Yusef Komunyakaa called the anthology "marvelous," and historian Howard Zinn noted that "this rich collection of poetry...fills a huge gap in our cultural heritage."

== Contributors ==
In order of table of contents:

- Joseph O. Legaspi
- Jennifer Kwon Dobbs
- Tenzin Tsundue
- Nick Carbó
- Ha Jin
- Alvin Pang
- Tanikawa Shuntaro
- Venus Khoury-Ghata
- Pak Chaesam
- Xuan Quynh
- Vikram Seth
- Hamid Ismailov
- Mong-Lan
- Romesh Gunesekera
- Rajinderpal S. Pal
- Kyi May Kaung
- Cyril Wong
- Chin Woon Ping
- Dilawar Karadaghi
- Nguyen Quang Thieu
- Aku Wuwu
- Jon Pineda
- Kimiko Hahn
- Leong Liew Geok
- Rajendra Kishore Panda
- Abdellatif Laabi
- Shukrulla
- Chitra Banerjee Divakaruni
- Luis Cabalquinto
- David Avidan
- Xue Di
- Diana Der-Hovanessian
- Jessica Hagedorn
- Mamdouh Adwan
- Kamaran Mukri
- Noozar Elias
- Manju Kanchuli
- Fazil Husnu Daglarca
- Kitamura Taro
- Leung Ping-kwan
- Ravi Shankar
- Taha Muhammad Ali
- Yan Li
- Nirmalendu Goon
- Patrick Rosal
- Gregory Djanikian
- Cesar Ruiz Aquino
- Ishigaki Rin
- Kazi Nazrul Islam
- Firuza Mammadli
- Xie Ye
- Mohan Koirala
- Tsuji Yukio
- K. Dhondup
- Mohja Kahf
- Purna Bahadur Vaidya
- Wadih Sa'adeh
- Yong Shu Hoong
- Boey Kim Cheng
- Issa Makhlouf
- Saqi Farooqi
- Zakariyya Muhammad
- Muhammed al-Acha'ari
- Syed Shamsul Haq
- Unsi al-Haj
- Yi Sha
- Nazik al-Mala'ika
- Meena Alexander
- Bimal Nibha
- Gieve Patel
- Sa'adyya Muffareh
- Nurit Zarhi
- Wing Tek Lum
- Ahmad 'Abd al-Mu'ti Hijazi
- Hatif Janabi
- Li-Young Lee
- Barouyr Sevag
- Shirley Geok-lin Lim
- Yang Lian
- Rukmini Bhaya Nair
- Cathy Park Hong
- Che Qianzi
- Jose Garcia Villa
- Fatima Mahmoud
- Arun Kolatkar
- Lawrence Joseph
- Brian Kim Stefans
- Habib Tengour
- Prageeta Sharma
- Mei-mei Berssenbrugge
- Sarah Gambito
- Katayoon Zandvakili
- Aimee Nezhukumatathil
- Marilyn Chin
- John Yau
- Ahmad Dahbour
- Lale Muldur
- Tada Chimako
- Taufiq Rafat
- Yeow Kai Chai
- Kitasono Katue
- Tan Lin
- Wafaa' Lamrani
- Monica Youn
- Bahtiyar Vahapzade
- Arvind Krishna Mehrotra
- Etel Adnan
- Alamgir Hashmi
- Abed Ismael
- Arundhathi Subramaniam
- Marjorie Evasco
- Khaled Mattawa
- Tsai Yim Pui
- Yu Jian
- Baha Zain
- Vidhu Aggarwal
- Ouyang Yu
- Jalal el-Hakmaoui
- B. S. Mardhekar
- Paolo Javier
- Salim Barakat
- Ricardo M. de Ungria
- Srikanth Reddy
- Jenny Boully
- Michael Ondaatje
- Earth of Drowned Gods
- Saadi Youssef
- Latif Nazemi
- Sesshu Foster
- R. Cheran
- Muhammad al-Maghut
- Jeet Thayil
- Kedarnath Singh
- Fadwa Tuqan
- Pham Tien Duat
- Shang Qin
- Aharon Shabtai
- Abbas Beydoun
- Hsien Min Toh
- Suheir Hammad
- Fawzia Afzal-Khan
- Marne L. Kilates
- S. Sivasegaram
- Mohammad Kazem Kazemi
- Rafiq Azad
- Linh Dinh
- 'Abd-Allah al-Baraduni
- Pireeni Sundaralingam
- Carolyn Marie Souaid
- Meng Lang
- Walid Bitar
- Monzer Masri
- Nadia Anjuman
- Xiong Hong
- Hayan Charara
- Hilmy Salem
- Hasab al-Shaikh Ja'far
- Ketaki Kushari Dyson
- Ashur Etwebi
- Taslima Nasrin
- Khalil Reza Uluturk
- Luisa A. Igloria
- Duo Duo
- Prathibha Nandakumar
- Yang Mu
- Mahmoud Darwish
- Vijay Seshadri
- Fatma Kandil
- Lisa Asagi
- Kim Sung-hui
- Mani Rao
- Rick Barot
- Zhang Er
- Eileen Tabios
- C. Dale Young
- Buddhadeva Bose
- Chogyam Trungpa
- Eva Ranaweera
- Paul Tan
- Muhammad al-Ghuzzi
- Melih Cevdet Anday
- Qasim Haddad
- Moniza Alvi
- Arthur Sze
- Angkarn Kalayanaphong
- Luis H. Francia
- Takahashi Mutsuo
- Taher Riyad
- Wang Xiaoni
- Tamura Ryuichi
- Yao Feng
- Kunwar Narain
- Sajjad Sharif
- Rachida Madani
- Monica Ferrell
- Nacera Mohammadi
- Hung Hung
- Arthur Yap
- Shiraishi Kazuko
- Joy Kogawa
- Erkin Vahidov
- Sherko Bekes
- To Thuy Yen
- Suerkul Turgunbayev
- Tina Chang
- Anjum Hasan
- Edgar B. Maranan
- Ziba Karbassi
- Bhanu Kapil
- Chuan Sha
- Adrian A. Husain
- Sankha Ghosh
- Al-Saddiq al-Raddi
- A. K. Ramanujan
- Montri Umavijani
- Manjul
- Ranjit Hoskote
- Rajee Seth
- Roy Miki
- Ling Yu
- Esmail Khoi
- Manohar Shetty
- Malathi Maitri
- Amal Dunqul
- Koike Masayo
- Atamurad Atabayev
- Nathalie Handal
- R. Zamora Linmark
- Apostrophe in the Scripture
- Nazim Hikmet
- Keki N. Daruwalla
- Adonis
- Gu Cheng
- Jean Arasanayagam
- Granaz Moussavi
- Bryan Thao Worra
- Lam Thi My Da
- Jam Ismail
- Faiz Ahmed Faiz
- Yehuda Amichai
- To Hu'u
- Jayanta Mahapatra
- Maya Bejerano
- Ghassan Zaqtan
- Barbara Tran
- Muhammad 'Afifi Matar
- Kim Kwang-kyu
- Y. Nhi
- D. H. Melhem
- Joko Pinurbo
- Amir Or
- Waleed Khazindar
- Saniyya Saleh
- Ahmad Shamlu
- Amjad Nasser
- Bejan Matur
- H. S. Shiva Prakash
- U. Sam Oeur
- Mammad Araz
- Shamsur Rahman
- Sitor Situmorang
- Kadhim Jihad
- Sholeh Wolpe
- Shin Kyong-nim
- Naomi Shihab Nye
- Chen Li
- Sudeep Sen
- Samuel Hazo
- Jibananda Das
- Xi Chuan
- Partaw Naderi
- Oktay Rifat
- Samih al-Qasim
- Banira Giri
- Simin Behbahani
- Nadia Tueni
- Asadullah Habib
- Garrett Hongo
- Al Mahmud
- Choman Hardi
- Bhupi Sherchan
- Dilip Chitre
- Amin Kamil
- Ravil Bukharaev
- Luo Zhicheng
- Mohammad Rafiq
- Vivek Narayanan
- Gevorg Emin
- Wong Phui Nam
- Bei Dao
- Yasmine Gooneratne
- Louise Ho
- M. Athar Tahir
- Ilhan Berk
- Bino A. Realuyo
- Gurbannazar Eziz
- Abd al-Aziz al-Maqalih
- Kirpal Singh
- Brian Komei Dempster
- Hassan Najmi
- Ak Welsapar
- Dorji Penjore
- Nguyen Duy
- Dom Moraes
- Gemino H. Abad
- G. S. Sharat Chandra
- Edip Cansever
- Al-Munsif al-Wahaybi
- Agnes S. L. Lam
- Merlie M. Alunan
- Bashir Sakhawarz
- Sohrab Sepehri
- Zhai Yongming
- Salma Khadra Jayyusi
- Peter Balakian
- U. Tin Moe
- Suji Kwock Kim
- Gyalpo Tsering
- Farah Didi
- Elmaz Abinader
- Bowl of Air and Shivers
- Sarat Kumar Mukhopadhyay
- Tsering Wangmo Dhompa
- Pimone Triplett
- Russell C. Leong
- Sargon Boulus
- Agyeya
- Goenawan Mohamad
- Ko Un
- Liu Kexiang
- Muhammad Haji Salleh
- Muhammed al-Faituri
- Behcet Necatigil
- Viswanatha Satyanarayana
- Kim Nam-jo
- Nissim Ezekiel
- Suyunbay Eraliev
- Lisa Suhair Majaj
- K. Satchidanandan
- Dahlia Ravikovitch
- Rafiq Raaz
- Yona Wallach
- Saksiri Meesomsueb
- Eunice de Souza
- Eric Gamalinda
- Indran Amirthanayagam
- Woeser
- Cathy Song
- Yusuf al-Khal
- Najwan Darwish
- Nazeeh Abu Afash
- Fehmida Riyaz
- Amrita Pritam
- Abdul Bari Jahani
- Ku Sang
- Sujata Bhatt
- Suresh Parshottamdas Dalal
- Abdullah Habib al-Maaini
- Sasaki Mikiro
- Badr Shakir al-Sayyab
- Shanta Acharya
- Shiv Kumar Batalvi
- Rahman Rahi
- Toya Gurung
- Saif al-Rahbi
- Eshqabil Shukur
- Suad al-Kawari
- Debjani Chatterjee
- Sally Ito
- Ngodup Paljor
- Amina Said
- Andree Chedid
- Edith L. Tiempo
- Phan Nhien Hao
- Masud Khan
- Eugene Gloria
- Attila Ilhan
- Hilary Tham
- Abdallah Zrika
- Dan Pagis
- Nujoum al-Ghanim
- Alfred A. Yuson
- Sapardi Djoko Damono
- Buddhadhasa Bhikkhu
- Oliver de la Paz
- Ayukawa Nobuo
- Muhammed Hasan 'Awwad
- Michelle Yasmine Valladares
- Du' Thi Hoan
- The Quivering World
- Evelyn Lau
- Bibhu Padhi
- Qian Xi Teng
- Xi Xi
- Ustad Khalilullah Khalili
- Agha Shahid Ali
- M. A. Sepanlu
- Nathan Zach
- Abdul Wahab al-Bayati
- R. Parthasarathy
- Ishle Yi Park
- Justin Chin
- Timothy Liu
- Ito Hiromi
- Forugh Farrokhzad
- Zheng Danyi
- Kishwar Naheed
- Abd el-Monem Ramadan
- Salah 'Abd al-Sabur
- Kazim Ali
- Sufia Kamal
- Zareh Khrakhouni
- Bozor Sobir
- Sylva Gaboudikian
- Perveen Shakir
- Shu Ting
- Hong Yun-suk
- Thanh Thao
- Wang Ping
- Ahmad Reza Ahmadi
- Cecep Syamsul Hari
- Laurence Wong
- Rishma Dunlop
- Kim Su-yong
- 'Enayat Jaber
- Medakse
- Mureed Barghouthy
- Priya Sarukkai Chabria
- Fawziyya Abu Khalid
- So Chong-ju
- Abdullah Goran
- Muhammed Bennis
- Partow Nooriala
- Bassam Hajjar
- Nader Naderpour
- Ooka Makoto
- Agnes Lam
- Reetika Vazirani
- Dorothea Rosa Herliany
- Zahrad
- Nabila Azzubair
- Harris Khalique
- Hsia Yu
- Hu'u Thinh
- Nizar Qabbani.
