= Poetry Translation Centre =

The Poetry Translation Centre (PTC) is an organization dedicated to translating poetry from Africa, Asia and Latin America. It is a company limited by guarantee and a registered charity. It was founded by the British poet Sarah Maguire in 2004. Its work has been championed by such British poets as Nick Laird, and it is one of the Arts Council England's regularly funded organisations.

The PTC's website currently includes translations of 521 poems by more than 100 poets from 21 countries written in 19 different languages – from Amharic to Zapotec. The poems are given in three different versions: in the original language, as a basic "literal" translation and as the final version in English, thus giving a valuable insight into the translation process. The site also features recordings of poems read in English, Arabic, Kurdish, Portuguese, Somali, Tajik and Urdu, together with videos and podcasts of readings.

The PTC has organised several World Poets' Tours. The first, in 2005, introduced Partaw Naderi (Afghanistan), Gagan Gill (India), Toeti Heraty (Indonesia), Coral Bracho (Mexico), Maxamed Xaashi Dhamac "Gaariye" (Somaliland) and Al-Saddiq Al-Raddi (Sudan) to UK audiences. In 2008, Corsino Fortes (Cape Verde), Gaariye, Al-Saddiq and Farzaneh Khojandi (Tajikistan) took part in the Centre's second World Poets' Tour, which also featured the poetry of Kajal Ahmad (Kurdistan) and Noshi Gillani (Pakistan), who were unable to travel to the UK. In 2017 its collection The Sea-Migrations: Tahriib by Asha Lul Mohamud Yusuf, was named by the Sunday Times as the best poetry book of the year. It was translated from Somali by Clare Pollard with Maxamed Xasan "Alto" and Said Jama Hussein, and is published by Bloodaxe Books. In 2018 the Georgian poets Salome Benidze and Diana Anphimiadi toured the UK.

British poets who have contributed translations include Maura Dooley, Carole Satyamurti, Choman Hardi, David Harsent, Jane Duran, Jo Shapcott, Katherine Pierpoint, Lavinia Greenlaw, Mark Ford, Mimi Khalvati, Sarah Maguire, Sean O'Brien, Fran Lock and W. N. Herbert.
