= Chuan Sha =

Chinese-born Canadian poet and author

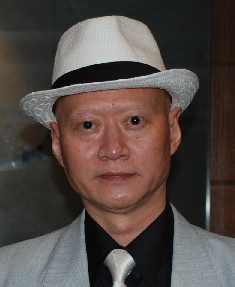
- A photograph of Chuan Sha taken in 2012
- Born: Yin Xiangze; 1952 (age 73–74)

Chuan Sha (川沙) is a Chinese-born Canadian poet and author. He has written novels, short stories, poems, plays, essays and literary reviews.

== Biography ==
Chuan Sha was born in Chongqing in Sichuan Province, though he has ancestry in Shandong Province. After graduating from Sichuan University, he worked as editor-in-chief for a literary magazine for some years before pursuing further studies in the United Kingdom in 1991. He has lived since 1999 with his family in Toronto.

He has been editor-in-chief for two Canadian publishing houses and for a number of local newspapers. He is now the Director of the Chinese-Canadian Poets Association, Dean of Daya Institute of Cultures of Canada, Co-Chair of the Daya Literary Prize Committee, and CEO of the Daya Academic Evaluation and Judgment Committee. In addition, he is a member of the Chinese PEN Society of Canada.

== Works ==
=== Prose ===
- The Lady in the Blue-Flowered Mandarin Gown 蓝花旗袍 (Huashan Literature and Art Publishing House, China, June 2012) ISBN 9787551103480 - novel
- The Sunlight (Taiwan Commercial Press, Ltd., November 2004) - novel
- The Sojourners (Taiwan Buffalo Publishing House, May 2004) - short stories, co-authored

=== Poetry ===
- Appreciation: Selected Poems of Chuan Sha 川沙诗歌精品欣赏 (Hebei Education Press, China, June 2010) ISBN 9787543477209
- "The Wolves are Roaring", translated by Liu Hong, in Language for a New Century: Contemporary Poetry from the Middle East, Asia, and Beyond, edited by Tina Chang, Nathalie Handal, Ravi Shankar (W. W. Norton & Company, U.S.A., 2008)
- Spring Night 春夜集 (Guangxi Normal University Press, February 2006) ISBN 9787563359301
- contribution to Variety Crossing Vol. 8 (Korean-Canadian Literary Forum, 21 Press, 2006)
- The Shadowy Crowds (China's Writers Printing House, November 2001)

=== Performances ===
- Harmony. Original poetry edited in 6-Act Choir. Public performances given in the P.C. Ho Theatre on November 1, 2008.
- The Skirts Are Singing. Original Poetry edited in 4-Act Musical. Public performances in O.I.S.E. Theatre, University of Toronto, and in York Woods Public Library Theatre, 2005.

== See also ==
- List of Canadian poets
