= Sarah Maguire =

British writer

- Born: 26 March 1957; London
- Died: 2 November 2017 (aged 60)
- Occupations: Poet, Translator

Sarah Maguire (26 March 1957 – 2 November 2017) was a British poet, translator and broadcaster.

== Life ==
Born in London, Sarah Maguire left school early to train as a gardener with the London Borough of Ealing (1974–77). Her horticultural career had a significant impact on her poetry: her third collection of poems The Florist's at Midnight (Jonathan Cape, 2001) brought together all her poems about plants and gardens, and she edited the anthology Flora Poetica: the Chatto Book of Botanical Verse (2001). She was also Poet in Residence at Chelsea Physic Garden, and edited A Green Thought in a Green Shade, essays by poets who have worked in a garden environment, published at the conclusion of this residency.

Maguire was the first writer to be sent to Palestine (1996) and Yemen (1998) by the British Council. As a result of these visits she developed a strong interest in Arabic literature; she translated the Palestinian poets Mahmoud Darwish and Ghassan Zaqtan and the Sudanese poet, Al-Saddiq Al-Raddi (2008). With Yama Yari, Maguire co-translated the Afghan poet Partaw Naderi (2008); their translation of A Thousand Rooms of Dream and Fear by the leading Afghan novelist, Atiq Rahimi (Chatto & Windus, 2006) was longlisted for the Independent Foreign Fiction Prize in 2007.

She was the only living English-language poet with a book in print in Arabic - her collection of selected poems, Haleeb Muraq (Dar-Al Mada, 2003), was translated by the leading Iraqi poet Saadi Yousef. Maguire was the founder and director of the Poetry Translation Centre, which opened in 2004.

The Sarah Maguire Prize for Poetry in Translation was launched by the Poetry Translation Centre on 12 September 2019 to recognise and encourage quality translation of poetry into English.

== Awards ==
- 2008: Cholmondeley Award
- 2001-03; Royal Literary Fund Writing Fellow at School of Oriental & African Studies, University of London

== Works ==
- "Passages". The Guardian. London. 8 August 2005.

=== Poetry Books ===
- Spilt Milk. Secker & Warburg. 1991. ISBN 978-0-9511023-3-6.
- The Invisible Mender. Cape Poetry. 1997.
- The Florist's at Midnight. Jonathan Cape. 2001. ISBN 978-0-224-06213-8.
- The Pomegranates of Kandahar. Chatto & Windus. 2007. ISBN 978-0-7011-8131-4.
- Almost the Equinox: Selected Poems. Chatto & Windus. 2015. ISBN 978-0-7011-8855-9.

=== Edited ===
- A Green Thought in a Green Shade: Poetry in the Garden. Poetry Society. 2000. ISBN 978-1-900771-26-9.
- Flora Poetica: The Chatto Book of Botanical Verse. Chatto & Windus. 2001. ISBN 978-0-7011-6922-0.

=== Translations ===
- Haleeb Muraq (Selected Poems). Saadi Yousef (trans.). Syria: Al-Mada House. 2003.
- Atiq Rahimi (2006). A Thousand Rooms of Dream and Fear. Yama Yari (trans.). Chatto & Windus. ISBN 978-0-7011-7673-0.
- Al-Saddiq Al-Raddi (2008). Poems. Sabry Hafez (trans.). Enitharmon/Poetry Translation Centre.
- Partaw Naderi (2008). Poems. Yama Yari (trans.). Enitharmon/Poetry Translation Centre.

=== Anthologies ===
- Susanne Ehrhardt; Paul May; Lucy Anne Watt; Robert Crawford; Sarah Maguire; Mark Ford (1989). New Chatto Poets: Number Two. Chatto & Windus. ISBN 978-0-7011-3393-1.
