= Asha Lul Mohamud Yusuf =

Somali poet

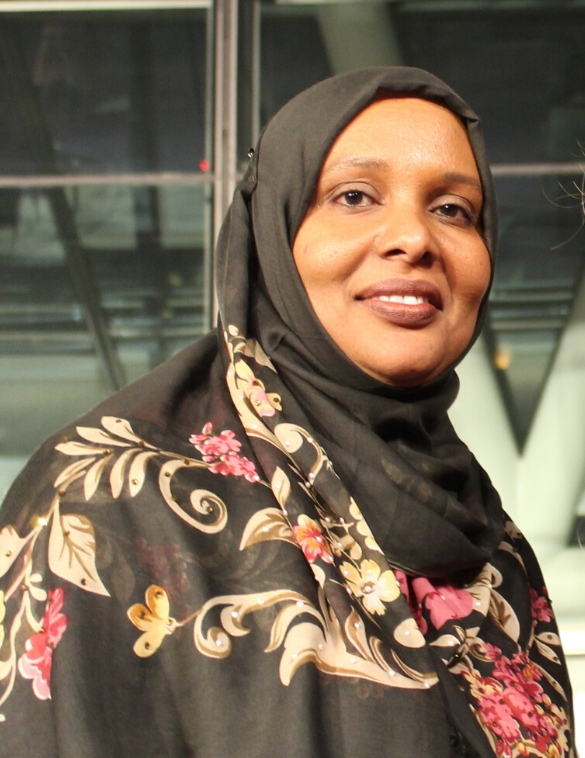
Asha Lul Mohamud Yusuf, London, 2018

Asha Lul Mohamud Yusuf is a contemporary Somali poet who has lived in exile in Britain since over 25 years.

Yusuf's dual-language Somali-English collection The Sea-Migrations was named as one of 2017's best poetry books of the year by both Jeremy Noel-Tod and Carol Rumens. Yusuf is a skilled woman poet in a field mostly generated by men, she is a master of many forms of Somali poetry like gabay that uses alliteration and rhythm to bring its argument across. She is a prominent figure in the Somali diaspora community through her engagement via her YouTube Channel and Whats App chain messages. She also is the host of a Somali TV show based in the UK.

== Works ==
- The Sea-Migrations: Tahriib. Translated by Clare Pollard, Said Jama Hussein and Maxamed Xasan ‘Alto’. Bloodaxe Books, 2017.
- Taste: Dookh. Translated by Maxamed Xasan ‘Alto’, Clare Pollard. The Poetry Translation Centre, 2012.
