= Louis-Vincent Thomas =

French scholar specializing in Africa

Louis-Vincent Thomas (20 May 1922 – 22 January 1994) was a French sociologist, anthropologist, ethnologist, and scholar whose specialty was Africa. After having taught at Cheikh Anta Diop University, he became a sociology professor at Paris Descartes University.

His writings deal with socialism, burials, and systems of thought in sub-Saharan Africa. He conducted comparative studies on death in Western culture and African culture. He often denounced the idea that anthropology and sociology are separate areas of study.

== Writings ==
- Louis-Vincent Thomas (March 2006). "Éléments pour un itinéraire". Sociétés (in French) (93). De Boeck Université: 39–43. ISBN 2-8041-5181-6.
- Louis-Vincent Thomas; Dominique Camus (2004). Pouvoirs sorciers. Enquêtes sur les pratiques actuelles de sorcellerie (in French). Imago.
- Louis-Vincent Thomas (2003). "La mort". Que Sais-Je (in French). PUF.
- Louis-Vincent Thomas (2000). Les chairs de la mort : corps, mort, Afrique (in French). Paris: Inst. d'Éd. Sanofi-Synthélabo.
- Louis-Vincent Thomas (1999). Mort et pouvoir (in French). Petite bibliothèque Payot.
- Louis-Vincent Thomas; René Luneau (1995). Les religions d'Afrique noire : textes et traditions sacrés (in French). Editions Stock.
- Louis-Vincent Thomas; François Laplantine (1993). "Anthropologie de la maladie. Etude ethnologique des systèmes de représentations étiologiques et thérapeutiques dans la sociétés contemporaines". Bibliothèque Scientifique Payot (in French).
- Martine Courtois (1991). Les Mots de la mort (in French). Éditions Belin. ISBN 2-7011-1155-2.
- Louis-Vincent Thomas; René Kaës; Didier Anzieu. "Fantasme et formation". Inconscient et Culture (in French). Dunod.
- Louis-Vincent Thomas (1998). Mort et pouvoir (in French). Petite bibliothèque Payot.
- Louis-Vincent Thomas; Issa Makhlouf (1992). Beyrouth ou la fascination de la mort (in French). Éditions de La Passion.
- Louis-Vincent Thomas (1988). Anthropologie des obsessions (in French). L'Harmattan.
- Louis-Vincent Thomas (1982). La Mort africaine: idéologie funéraire en Afrique noire (in French). Payot.
- Louis-Vincent Thomas (1979). Civilisation et divagations. Mort, fantasmes, science-fiction (in French). Payot.
- Louis-Vincent Thomas (1975). Anthropologie de la mort (in French). Payot. ISBN 2-228-11480-4.
- Louis-Vincent Thomas (1968). Cinq essais sur la mort africaine (in French). Dakar: Université de Dakar.
- Louis-Vincent Thomas (1966). Le socialisme et l'Afrique : Essai sur le socialisme africain (in French). Paris: Le livre Africain.
- Louis-Vincent Thomas (1966). Le socialisme et l'Afrique : L'idéologie socialiste et les voies africaines de développement (in French). Paris: Le livre Africain.
- Louis-Vincent Thomas (1965). Les idéologies négro-africaines d'aujourd'hui (in French). Paris: A.G. Nizet.
- Louis-Vincent Thomas (1959). Les Diola. Essai d'analyse fonctionnelle sur une population de Basse-Casamance (in French). Université de Paris.

== See also ==
=== Bibliography ===
- "Une galaxie anthropologique. Hommage à Louis-Vincent Thomas". Quel Corps? (in French) (38/39). October 1989.
- Socio-anthropologie de la mort : Louis-Vincent Thomas: dix ans après (in French). Bruxelles: Univ. Libre. 2005.
