= Al-Saddiq Al-Raddi =

Sudanese writer and poet

- Born: January 1969 (age 57); Omdurman, Sudan
- Occupations: writer, poet, journalist

Al-Saddiq Al-Raddi, Arabic: الصادق الرضي; born January 1969 in Omdurman, Sudan, is a Sudanese writer and poet.

== Career ==
Al-Saddiq has been publishing poetry since he was 15 when his poem The Wind was published in the literary journal Al-Shawa. Al-Saddiq was awarded first prize in a major poetry competition for young poets in 1986, and in the same year he became the youngest member of the Sudanese Writers Union. Al-Saddiq has worked as a journalist for many Sudanese newspapers, such as Alhoria (Freedom), Aladwaa, Al Ayam (The Days), and from 2006 until 2012 he was the cultural editor of Al-Sudani newspaper.

In April 2004, Al-Saddiq recited his poetry at the Abu Dhabi International Book Fair. His poetry has been translated into English by the Poetry Translation Centre in translations by Sudanese poet Hafiz Kheir with English poets Sarah Maguire and Mark Ford. Al-Saddiq has recited his poetry in many British cities on tours organized by the Poetry Translation Centre, including venues such as SOAS and the Fitzwilliam Museum. He has also participated in many workshops for poetry translation in Britain and Sudan, including the congress of translation from Arabic to English and from English to Arabic held under the auspices of the British Council at the London Book Fair in 2006. In March 2006, Al-Saddiq was invited to recite at the Poetry Cafe in London. In 2010, he participated in the Poetry International Festival in Rotterdam. In 2012, he was poet in residence at the Petrie Museum. In 2014, Al-Saddiq continues to tour and has given readings at venues such as the Southbank Centre in London and Ledbury Poetry Festival.

Al-Saddiq's work has been published in literary magazines such as The London Review of Books, Poetry Review, and The Times Literary Supplement.

== Works ==
- Ghina' al-'Uzlah (Songs of Solitude), poetry collection published in 1996 and 1999
- Matahat al-Sultan (The Sultan's Labyrinth), poetry collection also published in 1996
- Aqasi Shashat al-Isgha' (The Far Reaches of the Screen, aka The Limits of the Screen of Listening), poetry collection published in 1999 and 2000
- A volume of collected poems was published in 2009 in Cairo

== Family ==
Al-saddig is married to Intisar Al-Hassan Ibrahim and has three children. The oldest, born on 2005, is Rifqa Mohamed, then Rihab Mohamed born on 2006 and his only son Al-raddi was born on 2008. They were all born in Sudan, Khartoum, Omdurman. 2008 2015 2019
