= Ravi Shankar (poet) =

American poet

Dr. Ravi Shankar
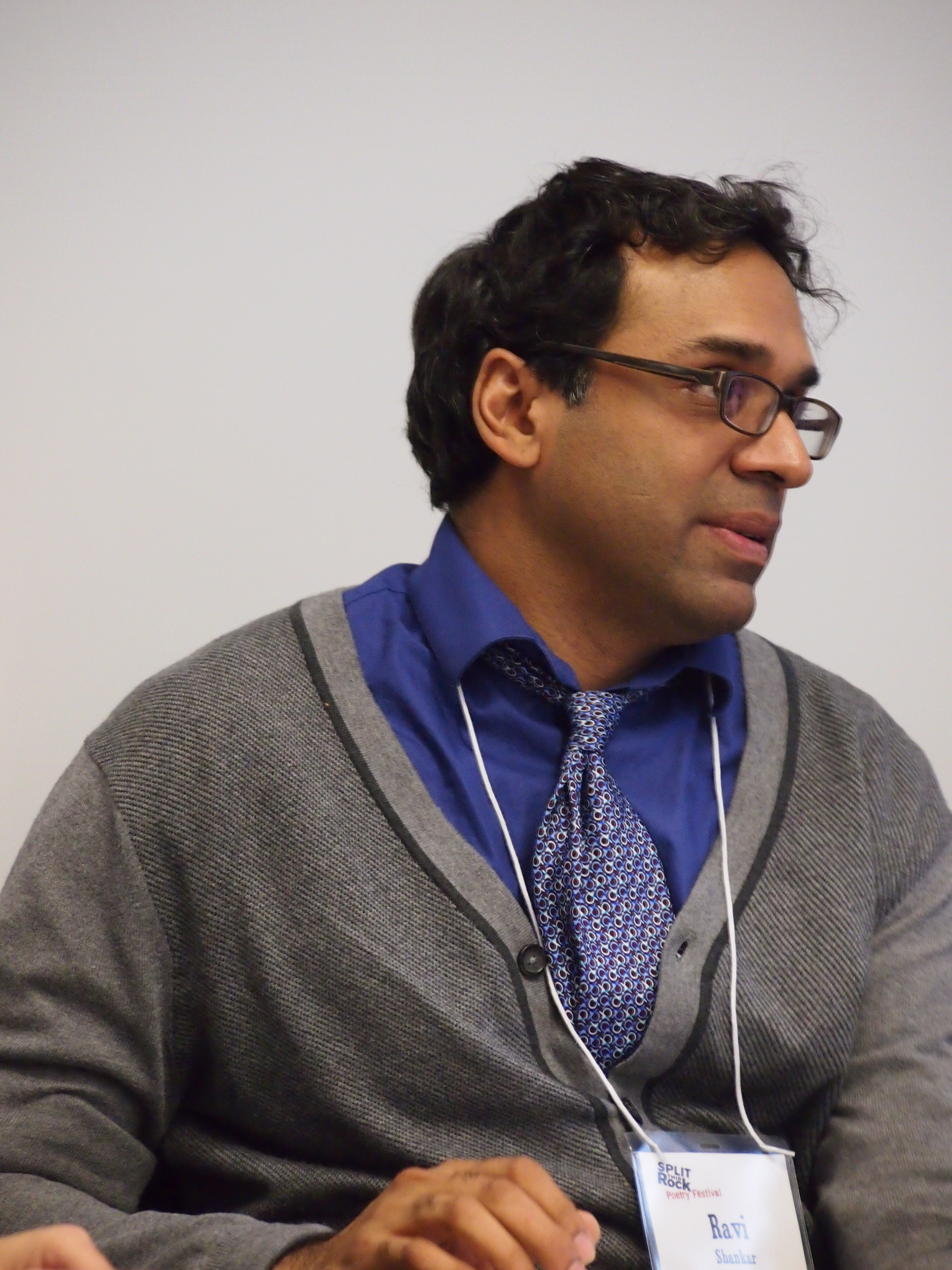
- Born: 1975 (age 50–51)
- Citizenship: American
- Education: PhD
- Alma mater: University of Virginia; Columbia University School of the Arts; University of Sydney
- Writing career
- Language: Tamil; English
- Period: contemporary
- Genres: Poetry, Translation, Criticism and Memoir
- Notable awards: Pushcart Prize Muse India Translation Award National Poetry Review Prize New York Foundation for the Arts; Corporation of Yaddo; MacDowell Colony; Rhode Island State Council of the Arts Artist Fellowship; Glenna Luschei Prairie Schooner Award

Ravi Shankar (born 1975) is an American poet, editor, and former literature professor at Central Connecticut State University and City University of Hong Kong and Chairman of the Asia Pacific Writers & Translators (APWT). He has given a TED (conference) talk on #impuritanthinking and is the founding editor of online literary journal Drunken Boat. He has been called "a diaspora icon" by The Hindu and "one of America's finest younger poets" by former Connecticut poet laureate Dick Allen.

== Career ==
Shankar received his bachelor's degree from the University of Virginia, his M.F.A. in poetry from the Columbia University School of the Arts and his PhD as an international research fellow at the University of Sydney. He moved to Chester from Brooklyn, and joined the Central Connecticut State University (CCSU) as a faculty member in 2002. He was also a guest teacher of the masters program at Fairfield University. He was elected Chairman of the Connecticut Young Writers Trust in 2011. In 2014, he was promoted from the rank of associate professor to professor at CCSU. He also served as co-director of the creative writing minor at CCSU. He has appeared on PBS and on National Public Radio. He received the university-level Trustees Research Award as a faculty member at CSUS in 2009. In the same year, he also received a fellowship award from The Connecticut Commission on Culture and Tourism and Summer Literary Seminars fellowship to Kenya. He has taught around the world including at Wesleyan University Summer Writing Conference, City University of Hong Kong, Eastern Mediterranean University in Cyprus, Sun Yat Sen University in China and his poetry has been translated into over a dozen languages, including French, German, Spanish, Hindi, Italian, Bengali, Urdu, Tamil, Slovenian, Russian, Greek, Mandarin, and Japanese.

In 1999, he founded Drunken Boat. As of 2018, he was a teacher at the New York Writers Workshop and City University of Hong Kong. He is Chairman of the Asia Pacific Writers & Translators Organization . and a board member of the New York Writers Workshop. He has held fellowships from Yaddo, the MacDowell Colony, Djerassi Artists Residency, Ragdale, the Blue Mountain Center, the Jentel Foundation, iPark, the Virginia Center for the Creative Arts, and the Vashon Artist Residency and he received the prestigious University of Sydney International Research Fellowship to complete work on his memoir "Correctional" and to do research on the Puritanical roots and racial demographics of mass incarceration in the United States of America. His work has been animated by the Marshall Project and reviewed in Ploughshares.

=== Literary career ===
Shankar's collections of poetry include A Field Guide to Southern China (2019) written with T. S. Eliot Prize winner George Szrites, The Many Uses of Mint (2018), What Else Could it Be (2015), Instrumentality (2004), a finalist for the 2005 Connecticut Book Awards, and Deepening Groove (2011), winner of the National Poetry Review Prize. He has also served as an editor for other works such as Language for a New Century (2008), which was hailed as "a beautiful achievement for world literature" by Nobel laureate in Literature Nadine Gordimer. He won a Rhode Island State Council on the Arts Individual Artist Fellowship in 2017 His translations with Priya Sarukkai Chabria of the 8th century Tamil poet/saint Andal won the 2016/2017 Muse India Translation Award at the Hyderabad Literary festival. He also appeared as a guest speaker at the Jaipur Literature Festival in January 2018.

His literary works appeared in Paris Review, Fulcrum, McSweeney's, the AWP Writer's Chronicle, and Scribner's Best American Erotic Poems. In 2014, he won Glenna Luschei Award from Prairie Schooner.

== Controversies ==
Shankar became the subject of several controversies during 2010. He won a settlement against the NYPD, after being racially profiled under the stop-and-frisk policies later found illegal by New York Superior Court Judge Shira Scheindlin, and appeared on NPR to discuss his wrongful arrest. He was later arrested and convicted of a misdemeanor in a few public cases including driving with a suspended license. He served 90 days in Hartford Correctional Center as a pretrial confinement, an experience which he wrote about in The Hartford Courant.

In 2013, Shankar resigned from teaching at Central Connecticut State University. to accept an International Research Fellowship at the University of Sydney, where he received his PhD from the University of Sydney researching the racial roots of mass incarceration and the genre of the prison memoir. He also filed suit against the Connecticut State Colleges and Universities and won a settlement of $60,409, paid by the college authority to Shankar, in exchange for his resignation. He has published a memoir about his experiences entitled "Correctional," excerpts from which have been published in The New York Times, the Daily Beast, the Hartford Courant, The Common (magazine) and the Michigan Quarterly Review.

== Selected works ==
=== Essay Collection ===
- Bhutan: Land of the Thunder Dragon, (Fortunate Traveler, 2025)
- Tallying the Hemispheres, (Nirala Books, 2024)

=== Memoir ===
- Correctional, (University of Wisconsin Press, 2021)

=== Poetry ===
- Instrumentality, Harper & Row, 2004, (WordTech Communications, 2004)
- Wanton Textiles, with Reb Livingston, (No Tell Books, 2006)
- Seamless Matter, with Sol LeWitt (Chapbook), OHM Editions – Rain Taxi, 2010
- Deepening Groove, (The National Poetry Review Press, 2011)
- What Else Could It Be: Ekphrastics and Collaborations, (Carolina Wren Press, 2015)
- Durable Transit: New and Selected Poems, (Poetrywala, 2018)
- Many Uses of Mint, (Recent Works Press, 2018)
- A Field Guide to Southern China with George Szirtes, (Eyewear Press, 2019)

=== Translations ===
- The Autobiography of a Goddess, with Priya Sarukkai Chabria, Zubaan Books/University of Chicago Press, 2016

=== As editor ===
- Language for a New Century: Contemporary Poetry from Asia, the Middle East & Beyond, with Tina Chang and Nathalie Handal, W. W. Norton & Company, 2008
- Radha Says: Final Poems of Reetika Vazirani, Drunken Boat Books, 2010
- UNION: 50 Years of Writing from Singapore and 15 Years of Drunken Boat, with Alvin Pang, Drunken Boat Media, 2015
- The Golden Shovel Anthology: New Poems Honoring Gwendolyn Brooks, with Patricia Smith and Peter Kahn, University of Arkansas Press, 2017
- Meridian: The APWT/Drunken Boat Anthology of New Writing, with Tim Tomlinson and Peter Kahn, Sally Breen, 2020
