= IPark =

iPark
- Company type: Private
- Industry: Parking and parking garages
- Founded: 1962; 64 years ago
- Founder: William Lerner
- Headquarters: New York, United States
- Website: ipark.com

iPark is "New York City's second biggest private parking-garage operator" behind Icon Parking with their primary locations in Manhattan and three garages in Rego Park and two in Forest Hills. William Lerner is the founder and president of the company.

== Company history ==
iPark was founded in 1962 by Jack, the father of current owner Bill Lerner. The parking garage that began as a single 25-car lot expanded to 100 garages throughout New York in 1978 after Bill took over.

== Company information ==
iPark is the "largest, privately held owner-operated garages and parking lots" in the state of New York, and Bill Lerner has been the overseer of such growth. In 2011 iPark installed the company's first “Beam Charging” station in 14 of its garages. iPark also became known for owner Bill Lerner's initiative in the winter of 2014 that allowed iPark to send employees out to help “dig motorist parked within a five block radius of any of his 125 parking garages out of the snow for free.” iPark garages are also used as a “vehicle for exposure” for Bill Lerner and Alexson Roy's non-profit organization Billy4Kids; boxes are available in 110 iPark garages in New York to encourage people to “donate new or worn shoes” for children living in poverty who are exposed to “foot-born diseases.”
