= Luis H. Francia =

American poet, playwright, journalist

- Born: Luis H. Francia; Manila, Philippines
- Occupations: Poet, playwright, journalist, and nonfiction writer
- Spouse(s): Midori Yamamura, Ph.D.
- Writing career
- Genres: Poetry, plays, journalism, memoirs, history
- Notable works: Eye of the Fish: A Personal Archipelago (2001), RE: Recollections, Reviews, Reflections (2015)

Luis H. Francia is a Filipino American poet, playwright, journalist, and nonfiction writer. His memoir, Eye of the Fish: A Personal Archipelago, won both the 2002 PEN Open Book and the 2002 Asian American Literary Awards.

== Early life and education ==
Francia was born in Manila, Philippines. He graduated from the Ateneo de Manila University with an AB in Humanities, cum laude and moved to New York in the 1970s. As a budding poet in New York, he studied with José García Villa, the National Artist of the Philippines for literature, at The New School and later at his private workshop in Greenwich Village. Francia wrote the introduction to the 2008 Penguin Classics edition of Villa’s poetry, Doveglion: Collected Poems.

He has taught at Sarah Lawrence College, Yale University, City University of Hong Kong, Ateneo De Manila University, the Iowa Writers' Workshop, and Hunter College. Currently, he writes an online column "The Artist Abroad" for the Philippine Daily Inquirer and teaches at New York University.

He lives in Queens with his wife, Dr. Midori Yamamura, an associate professor of art history at Kingsborough Community College (CUNY) and a lecturer at the Museum of Modern Art.

== Career ==
His poetry books include The Arctic Archipelago and other poems, The Beauty of Ghosts, Museum of Absences, and Tattered Boat. In 1978, he won first prize in the poetry competition of the Carlos Palanca Memorial Awards for Literature for "15 Poems". He has two essay collections, Memories of Overdevelopment: Reviews and Essays of Two Decades and RE: Recollections, Reviews, Reflections, which won the National Book Development Board and the Manila Critics’ Circle National Book Award for Best Collection of Essays in English in 2016. He also completed A History of the Philippines: from Indios Bravos to Filipinos in 2010.

Two of Francia’s plays have been staged: The Beauty of Ghosts at Topaz Arts in New York in 2007 and 2014 and The Strange Case of Citizen de la Cruz at Bindlestiff Studio in San Francisco in 2012.

He is the editor of Brown River, White Ocean: An Anthology of Twentieth Century Philippine Literature in English; co-editor with Eric Gamalinda of Flippin’: Filipinos on America, and with Angel Velasco Shaw of Vestiges of War: The Philippine-American War and the Aftermath of an Imperial Dream, 1899-1999. He is included in numerous anthologies, including The Library of America’s Becoming Americans: Four Centuries of Immigrant Writing.

Francia has written for a number of publications, including The Village Voice, The Nation, and The New York Times. He was a New York correspondent for Hong Kong’s Asiaweek and a correspondent for the Far Eastern Economic Review. He also has provided commentary for National Public Radio (NPR) and KPFA in San Francisco.

== Awards, artist grants, and fellowships ==
=== Awards ===
- 1978 Carlos Palanca Memorial Awards for Literature, first prize in poetry for “15 Poems”
- 2002 PEN Open Book Award Award Winner for Eye of the Fish: A Personal Archipelago
- 2002 Asian American Literary Award Winner for Eye of the Fish: A Personal Archipelago
- 2013 Filipino American National Historical Society, Metro New York Chapter Lifetime Achievement Award
- 2014 Gawad Balagtas Award for literature, UMPIL (Writers Union of the Philippines)
- 2014 Knights of Rizal Award for Achievements in Arts and Literature
- 2016 National Book Development Board and the Manila Critics’ Circle National Book Award for Best Collection of Essays in English

=== Artist grants and fellowships ===
- New York State Council for the Arts, translation grant for Filipino poetry into English (1985)
- Center for American Culture Studies at Columbia University Writer-in-Residence (1986)
- Asian CineVision Writer-in-Residence (1988)
- Edna St. Vincent Millay Arts Colony Writing Fellowship (1992)
- Fundacíon Valparaiso/Beckett Foundation Writing Fellowship (2000)
- Asian Cultural Council, research and writing grant for theater (2003)
- Queens Council of the Arts, individual artist grant for poetry (2007)
- Sun Yat-sen University Writer-in-Residence (fall 2017)

== Works ==
=== Poetry ===
- Her Beauty Likes Me Well, with David Friedman, Petrarch Press, 1975
- The Arctic Archipelago and other poems, Ateneo de Manila University, 1992 ISBN 9715500536
- Museum of Absences, Meritage Press, 2004 ISBN 9715424155
- The Beauty of Ghosts, Ateneo De Manila University Press, 2010 ISBN 9715506089
- Tattered Boat, University of the Philippines Press, 2014 ISBN 9715427200

==== Poetry anthology inclusions (partial) ====
- Alfrredo Navarro Salanga and Esther Pacheco, eds. Versus: Philippine Protest Poetry. Manila: Ateneo de Manila University Press, 1986.
- Gemino Abad and Alfred Yuson, eds. The Best of Caracoa. Manila: Philippine Literary Arts Council, 1991.
- José García Villa, ed. The New Doveglion Book of Philippine Poetry. Manila: Anvil Publishing, 1993.
- Nick Carbó, ed. Returning a Borrowed Tongue. Minneapolis: Coffeehouse Press, 1996. ISBN 1566890438
- Gemino Abad, ed. A Habit of Shores: Filipino Poetry and Verse from English, ’60s to the ’90s. Quezon City: University of the Philippines Press, 1999. ISBN 9715422160
- Rajini Srikanth and Esther Y. Iwanaga, eds. Bold Words: A Century of Asian American Writing. New Brunswick, NJ: Rutgers University Press, 2001. ISBN 0813529662
- Ramón C. Sunico, Alfred A. Yuson, Alvin Pang, and Aaron Lee, eds. Love Gathers All: The Philippines-Singapore Anthology of Love Poetry. Manila/Singapore: Anvil Publishing/Ethos Books, 2002. ISBN 9810451008
- Nick Carbó and Eileen Tabios, eds. Pinoy Poetics. San Francisco: Meritage Press, 2004. ISBN 0970917937
- Edwin Lozada, ed. Field of Mirrors: Anthology of Philippine-American Writers. San Francisco: Philippine American Writers and Artists, Inc. 2008. ISBN 0976331632
- Tina Chang, Nathalie Handal, and Ravi Shankar, eds. Language for a New Century: Contemporary Poetry from the Middle East, Asia, and Beyond. New York: Norton, 2008. ISBN 0393332381
- Steve Fellner and Phil Young, eds. Love Rise Up: Poems of Social Justice, Protest & Hope. Hopkins, Minnesota: Benu Press, 2012. ISBN 0984462961
- Rajeev S. Patke, Isabela Banzon, Philip Holden, Lily Rose Tope, eds. An Anthology of English Writing from Southeast Asia. Singapore: National Library Board, 2014. ISBN 9810877617
- Gemino Abad and Mookie Katigbak-Lacuesta, eds. The Achieve of, the Mastery: Filipino Poetry and Verse from English, Mid-'90s to 2016. 2 vols. Quezon City: University of the Philippines Press, 2018. ISBN 978971542871-2

=== Theater/performance ===
- The Beauty of Ghosts. Poetry narratives performed by professional actors and poets. Topaz Arts, New York, 2007 world premiere and 2014 revival.
- The Strange Case of Citizen de la Cruz. World premiere of full-length play, Bindlestiff Theater, San Francisco, 2012.
- Black Henry. Dramatic reading of full-length play. New York: Diverse City Theater Company, 2007; Topaz Arts, 2014; Philippines: Cebu City, 2016.
- “Fruity Text.” Poetry for performance, commissioned by choreographer Paz Tanjuatquio. Brooklyn: Long Island University, 1998; Manhattan: The Merce Cunningham Dance Studio, 1999.

=== Nonfiction ===
- Memories of Overdevelopment: Reviews and Essays of Two Decades, Anvil Pub, 1998 ISBN 9712707563
- Eye of the Fish: A Personal Archipelago, MUAE Publishing, 2001 ISBN 1885030312
- A History of the Philippines: from Indios Bravos to Filipinos, The Overlook Press, 2010 ISBN 1590202856
- RE: Recollections, Reviews, Reflections, University of the Philippines Press, 2015 ISBN 9789715427821

=== Anthologies edited ===
- Co-editor with Indran Amirthanayagam, Kimiko Hahn, and Peter Kwong, "New Asia Issue: Selected writings by Asian-American authors," The Portable Lower East Side, Vol. 7, No. 2, 1990
- Brown River, White Ocean: An Anthology of Twentieth Century Philippine Literature in English, Rutgers University Press, 1993 ISBN 0813519993
- Co-editor with Eric Gamalinda, Flippin’: Filipinos on America, Asian American Writers' Workshop, 1996 ISBN 1889876011
- Co-editor with Angel Velasco Shaw, Vestiges of War: The Philippine-American War and the Aftermath of an Imperial Dream, 1899-1999, NYU Press, 2002 ISBN 0814797903
