= Clone (Chabria novel) =

South Asian Science Fiction

- Author: Priya Sarukkai Chabria
- Genre: Science fiction
- Publisher: Zubaan
- Publication date: 2018
- ISBN: 978-93-85932-43-4

Clone is a science fiction novel by Indian author Priya Sarukkai Chabria, published by Zubaan Books in 2018. Set in 24th century India, the novel follows a clone, as she attempts to recover the memories and final message of her genetic predecessor, the writer Aa-Aa, while living in the dystopian 'Global Community'. Clone is a revised 10th anniversary republishing of Chabria's 2008 novel Generation 14.

== Plot summary ==
Clone is set in a far-future 'Global Community', a highly stratified society that is divided into echelons. There are the elite Originals who live in floating palaces, genetically modified 'Zombies' who serve as administrators, insectoid 'Firehearts' who serve as interrogators, and 'Clones' who do menial labor under the influence of a compliance inducing drug. Due to a weakening in the cloning blueprint over several generations, Clone 14/54/G, the protagonist, begins experiencing vivid past 'visitations'. The Clone experiences the lives of several other people and animals from different periods, including a palace parrot, a condemned guard, a fish seeking enlightenment, a Buddhist novice, a grieving mother after the Kalinga War, and the dog Trichaisma.

During a brief encounter with her 'twin-clone', the protagonist 14/54/G learns that 14/53/G also bears the same 'visitation' causing mutation. 14/54/G is given an antidote to the compliance drug by her twin. The Clone stops consuming the government prescribed sedatives, and starts undergoing erratic change. The 'Global Community' addressing a sweep of malfunctioning clones, scans 14/54/G but is unable to detect anything.

The state prepares to host the annual 'Celebrations', where during one of the rehearsals, the protagonist sees her twin 14/53/G being led into the arena to be executed. Consuming a 'horse-pill', a military grade adrenaline supplement, the Clone desperately fights to protect her twin who eventually dies. The combat is halted by an Original called Leader. The protagonist is moved to a 'comfort capsule' owned by Leader, where under the influence of a 'truth-serum' she is interrogated by the Fireheart Couplet. 14/54/G starts speaking in poetic riddles, derived from the inherited memories of her 21st century Original, the dissident writer Aa-Aa. It is revealed that Leader is Aa-Aa's son and seeks to uncover her final testament. After guided tours outside the capsule reveal the suppression of the Clones for the Original's interests, Couplet and 14/54/G agree to work together for 'The Cause'.

On celebration day, 14/54/G is forced by the Supreme Commander to deliver Aa-Aa's final speech under submission. Instead she uses it to incite a rebellion by claiming her humanity. The Supreme Commander fires his 'ruby bouquet', a lethal laser beam, at 14/54/G. Leader, the son of the Supreme Commander, sacrifices himself to protect the Clone. Chaos erupts, and 14/54/G escapes the arena on a spacecraft en route to a rebel colony on the Moon, with Couplet and the fatally wounded Leader, as a clone rebellion engulfs the realm.

== Characters ==
- 14/54/G- The protagonist of the novel and a fourteenth generation Clone, chosen to reconstruct the memories of her Original Aa-Aa. Through these reconstructions, she learns about Aa-Aa’s life and her resistance against the Global Community. At the same time, these reconstructions and physical changes increasingly affect her own sense of identity, blurring the boundaries between herself and the Original. She later becomes involved with the resistance led by Leader.
- Aa-Aa- The Original of 14/54/G and a celebrated scholar who became increasingly critical of the Global Community. She opposed the treatment of Clones and the suppression of dissent. She was imprisoned and eventually died, leaving the final message for14/54/G to reveal.
- Leader- The son of Aa-Aa and the Supreme Commander.. He is involved in the resistance against the Global Community. He accompanies the Clone during her journey and helps her access restricted areas and sites, and eventually develops a romantic relationship with the Clone. He plans to use the 'Celebrations' as a stage to challenge the Global Community but is fatally wounded as result.
- Couplet- A Fireheart who is also involved in the resistance against the Global Community and guides the Clone through her memory reconstructions and accompanies her on her journey with Leader and Duke. Couplet escapes Earth with others and travels towards the resistance colony on the Moon.
- Blank Verse- Blank Verse is a Fireheart who works with Couplet. Blank Verse and Couplet investigate grief at a museum and work together on an epic poem. After Blank Verse is hunted, it leaves portions of its memory for Couplet to use.
- Duke- Duke is a genetically engineered dog and accompanies the Clone, Leader and Couplet as they visit abandoned sites and historical locations.

== Reception ==
The novel was selected as one of the "Best Reads" of 2018 by the Feminist Press. Critics have noted Clone's departure from traditional science fiction tropes. Apala Bhowmick on Scroll.in highlighted the book's blend of magic realism and historical fiction, and emphasized that the novel operates through "yoked timelines," merging a twenty-fourth-century futuristic dystopia with fragmented visions of the Vedic and Mughal eras. The Usawa Literary Review praised its underlying exploration of Indian philosophy and the concept of the Ātman.

Mainstream publications have similarly commended its prose, with The Financial Times describing the writing as "eloquent" and the Deccan Herald characterizing it as "lyrically written". The novel has also been attributed for its protagonist's act of memory retrieval as "re-membering", a form of active resistance and counter-politics against state-led historical erasure.
