= Hartford Correctional Center =

Correctional center in Connecticut

- Location in Connecticut
- Location: Hartford, Connecticut; 41.793333°N 72.661111°W
- Status: Operational
- Security class: Level 4 (High)
- Capacity: 984
- Population: 918 (February 1, 2018)
- Opened: 1977
- Managed by: Connecticut Department of Correction
- Warden: Ned McCormick
- Website: https://portal.ct.gov/doc/facility/hartford-cc

Notable prisoners
- Ravi Shankar, Eyad Alrababah

Hartford Correctional Center is one of 18 correctional facilities in Connecticut, United States. The correctional center is located in Hartford, Connecticut. The facility was opened in 1977, with its first warden being Richard Wezowicz.

In March 2016, the participatory budgeting organization Hartford Decide$ set up a voting location at the facility so inmates could vote on how the city's money is spent.

Poet and former professor of English at Central Connecticut State University Ravi Shankar spent time at the facility, writing an op-ed about his experiences for the Hartford Courant.

In 2017, Frontline and The New York Times collaborated on a PBS documentary called Life on Parole, which featured a former inmate of the correctional center, Errol Brantley Jr., and his struggles while on parole.

== Controversies ==
In 1980, the correctional center was sued by a group of pre-trial detainees and inmates for exposure to tuberculosis and other transmissible pathogens and overcrowding. In the case, Lareau v. Manson, the District Court of Connecticut found that the facility's overcrowding violated the inmates and detainees' due process rights to be free from cruel and unusual punishment and that the lack of screening procedures for contagious diseases violated all the facility's inmate's constitutional rights.

Eyad Alrababah was arrested following the September 11 attacks and held as a material witness in the facility after voluntarily contacting the FBI to offer information. He was held at the correctional center for about twenty days in solitary confinement, was strip- and cavity-searched multiple times, and was not brought before a judge until a month later, according to Human Rights Watch.

In 2016, one of the facility's correctional officers were charged with two counts of sexually assaulting inmates.
