= Alhoria =

Alhoria, or Al Horia, and possibly Ajaraz Al Horia is a newspaper based out of Khartoum, Sudan. Huriya in Arabic translates to freedom in English. The newspaper was shut down for political reasons in April 2009.
