= Priya Sarukkai Chabria =

Indian poet

- Born: 1955 (age 70–71)
- Citizenship: Indian
- Occupations: Author, poet, novelist, translator
- Writing career
- Notable works: Not Springtime Yet, Andal: The Autobiography of a Goddess, Clone, Sing of Life, Bombay/Mumbai:Immersions
- Notable awards: Fellowship from the Indian Government, Muse India Translation award
- Website: priyasarukkaichabria.com

Priya Sarukkai Chabria (born 1955) is an Indian poet, translator, and novelist who writes in English. She was awarded for her contributions by the Indian government.

== Early life and education ==
She was born in Chennai; her mother was Saroja Kamakshi and father, Vasu Gopalan Sarukkai. Her sibling is Malavika Sarukkai, a Bharatnatyam dancer.

== Career ==
She has written four poetry collections, two speculative fiction novels, translations from Classical Tamil, literary nonfiction, and a novel. She has edited two poetry anthologies. She is also founding editor of Poetry at Sangam, an Indian online literary journal of poetry.

She has also written a 're-visioning' of Gitanjali by Rabindranath Tagore. This work, as per Sarukkai Chabria's interview in the Hindustan Times "retained the ideas and feelings of the original but pared and updated the language while arranging the words more freely on the page".

She is a member of the Advisory Council of G100 and Writers Immersion and Cultural Exchange, Australia.

Her poems have been translated into several languages, Indian and European.

Chabria is working on a memoir based on her recollections of her family accessed through a series of photographs reconstructed in words. She writes of having lost access to the photos after the demise of her mother in 2013. In her memoir, she is writing about them in order to "re-construct my past and familial connections in the best way I know: through words". The goal is to "reclaim my childhood and teenage years, re-establish relationships with elders... and revalidate my existence as a loved member of a family".

Besides writing, Chabria has also presented her work and availed residencies at Writer’s Centre, Norwich, Sun Yat-sen International Writers Program, Guangzhou, Commonwealth Literature Conference, Innsbruck, Alphabet City, Canada, Frankfurt Book Fair, UCLA, Jaipur Literature Festival, and Indian Institute of Advanced Studies. She has curated seminars for Sahitya Akademi, Raza Foundation- PIC, and a module of essays on Rasa theory for Sahapedia.

She also curated seminars for Sahitya Akademi, the Indian academy of letters.

She has participated in writers' residencies including:

- Writers’ Centre, Norwich
- Sun Yat-sen University International, China.

== Awards ==
Chabria, with poet Ravi Shankar, translated the songs of 8th century Tamil poet Andal in her book Andal: The Autobiography of A Goddess. The book won the 2017 Muse India translation award at the Hyderabad Literary Festival.

The Experimental Fiction Award in The Best Asian Speculative Fiction 2018, an anthology published by Kitaab International.

Her speculative novel Clone was called 'one of the best reads of 2018, by The Feminist Press.

== Selected works ==
=== Books ===
==== Poetry ====
- Sing of Life: Revisioning Tagore's Gitanjali. Context, Westland. 2021. ISBN 978-9390679942.
- Calling Over Water. Mumbai: Paperwall Media & Publishing Pvt. Ltd. 2019. ISBN 978-9382749981.
- Not Springtime Yet. New Delhi: HarperCollins Publishers India, a joint venture with the India Today Group. 2008. ISBN 9788172237714.

==== Novels (speculative fiction) ====
- Clone. New Delhi: Zubaan, University of Chicago Press. 2019. ISBN 9789385932434.
- Generation 14. New Delhi: Penguin Books. 2008. ISBN 9788189884062.

==== Translations ====
- With Shankar, Ravi (2016). Andal: The Autobiography of a Goddess. Zubaan, University of Chicago Press. ISBN 9789384757670.

==== Nonfiction ====
- Bombay/Mumbai :Immersions with photographer Christopher Taylor, Niyogi Books, New Delhi, 2013, ISBN 978-93-81523-68-1

==== As editor ====
- Fafnir's Heart: World Poetry in Translation. Mumbai: Bombaykala Books. 2018. ISBN 9788193835388.
- She curated a multimedia issue of e-journal Drunken Boat featuring a video clip of dance by Anita Ratnam, photographs by Naveen Kishore, translation by Arshia Sattar, and poems by Anupama Amaran, Arundhathi Subramaniam, David Need, Ellen Kombiyil, Menka Shivdasani, Naveen Kishore, rizio yohannan raj, and Sumana Roy.
- For Sahapedia, an open encyclopedic resource connected with "the arts, culture and history of India", Sarukkai Chabria curated and contributed to a module of various essays exploring, with contemporary eyes, the "layered heritage" of the Rasa theory and its significance: 'Rapture, Rasa and its Re-enactments in Subcontinental Aesthetics: Narratives of Practice.
- 50 Poems, 50 Poets. Open Space. 2004.

==== As contributing editor ====
Divining Dante. Australia: Recent Work Press. 2021. ISBN 9780645009057.

=== As contributor to anthologies ===
A partial list:

- Dialogues and Other Poems. Delhi: Sahitya Akademi. 2005. ISBN 9798126019914.
- Another English: Anglophone Poems from Around the World
- Adelphiana
- Asymptote
- Drunken Boat
- PEN International
- Post Road
- Reliquiae
- The Literary Review
- The Gollancz Book of South Asian Science Fiction
- The HarperCollins Book of English Poetry
- The British Journal of Literary Translation
- Language for a New Century
- Voyages of Body and Soul

=== As contributor to speculative fiction anthologies ===
- Blanket, Relatively True: Stories of Truth, Deception, Post-Truth From the Indian Subcontinent and Australia, Eds. Meenakshi Bharat & Sharon Rundle, Orient Black Swan, Hyderabad, 2022
- Cockaigne A Reappraisal (Draft) by Dr. Indumati Jones, Kitaab Anthology, Singapore, 2023
- Dreaming Of The Cool Green River, New Horizons: The Gollancz Book of South Asian Science Fiction, Ed. Tarun K Saint, Gollancz, London, 2019
- Flyby, Solarpunk Creatures: Climate Fiction for Future Ancestors, World Weavers Press, New Mexico, 2023
- Fragments from the Book of Beauty, Breaking the Bow: Speculative Fiction Inspired by The Ramayan, Ed. Anil Menon & Vandana Singh, Zubaan, New Delhi, 2012
- I Had A Dream, Ecoceanic: Global South Science Fiction, Eds. Tarun K Saint & Francesco Verso, Future Fiction, Roma, 2023
- Kairos, No News 90 Poets Reflect on a Unique BBC Newscast, Ed. Paul Munden, Alvin Pang & Shane Strange, Recent Work Press, Canberra, 2020
- Listen: A Memoir, Multispecies Cities Solarpunk Urban Futures, Eds. Christoph Ruppretch, Deborah Cleland, Norie Tamura, Rajat Chaudhuri and Sarena Ulibarri, World Weaver Press, New Mexico, 2021
- Manikkavachakar’s Space Odyssey, Divining Dante, Eds. Paul Munden & Nessa O’Mahony, Recent Work Press, Canberra, 2021
- Menaka Tells Her Story, Inner Line: The Zubaan Anthology of Stories by Indian Women, Ed. Urvashi Butalia, Zubaan, New Delhi, 2006
- Mid-Term Ecolit Examination Paper, The Mithila Review, Ed. Salik Shah, March 2020
- On a dissolving ice floe, Consequence, Spring 2022, Volume 14.1, Eds Matthew Krajniak & Katherine Hollander, Houston, 2022
- Paused, Avatar: Contemporary Indian Science Fiction, Eds. Tarun K Saint & Francesco Verso, Future Fiction, Roma, 2020
- Release (A ‘What if’ Manifesto: Imagine), The Freedom Issue, 2022, Open Magazine
- Scavenger, The Gollancz Book of South Asian Science Fiction Volume 2, Ed. Tarun K Saint, Hachette India, Gurugram, 2021

== Critical reception ==
In New Asian Writing, poet, translator and editor Aryanil Mukerjee described Sarukkai Chabria's Calling Over Water as "postmodern travel poetry" and a "poetic exercise of intertextuality rare to be found in Anglophone Indian poetry". In The Wire, writer, critic and academic Uttaran Das Gupta said Calling Over Water continued Sarukkai Chabria's "cross-genre explorations" and penchant for "elaborate references, experiments with form, and dauntless exploration of emotions".

Poet George Szirtes, T.S. Eliot Memorial Poetry Prize awardee for 2004, described Not Springtime Yet as ’The poems are passionate, sensuous and intelligent, full of energy and enterprise. They hold their dramatic shapes with grace and establish her as a poet to read and return to time and again'.

Writing in Scroll.in, Apala Bhowmick described the novel Clone as "a fresh, genre-bending variety of Indian speculative fiction – a compound comprising elements of magic realism, stream-of-consciousness narration, fabulist storytelling and certain characteristics of historical fiction". The speculative novel was said to be "the author’s attempt to position the role played by literature in this perplexed, dehumanised society".

In The Indian Express, TM Krishna, Carnatic vocalist, writer, activist and Ramon Magsaysay awardee, said, "She uses the play of image, experience and thought (that Andal miraculously bundles into a word or two) to excavate Andal. She enters her source through the membrane of Andal’s imagination, only to subsume herself within it." Krishna summed up, "Her nuanced interpretations give Andal a present aesthetic reality".
