= U Sam Oeur =

Cambodian Poet

U Sam Oeur (born 1936) is a Cambodian poet, a former member of the Parliament of Cambodia, and a former UN delegate. He is the author of a collection of poetry, Sacred Vows (1998), and a memoir, Crossing Three Wildernesses (2005). He is a devout Buddhist.

== Life ==
Born in 1936 in rural Svey Rieng Province, Cambodia, French Indochina, Oeur spent his youth farming rice and herding water buffalo. He received French colonial schooling in Phnom Penh. He later moved to the U.S., where he earned a B.A. in industrial arts at California State University, Los Angeles, and an M.F.A. from the Iowa Writers’ Workshop, where he was recruited as a student in poetry by Dr. Mary Gray, director of The Asia Foundation. After his education in the United States, Oeur returned to Cambodia, where he managed a cannery in Phnom Penh, worked in light industry, became a captain in the politician-general Lon Nol’s army, and served on the Cambodian delegation to the United Nations before the Khmer Rouge took over.

Oeur currently resides in McKinney, Texas, where he translates the poetry of Walt Whitman into Khmer.

=== The Khmer Rouge Era ===
Oeur returned to Cambodia from the United States in 1968. In subsequent years, he witnessed the Pol Pot takeover and the rule of the Khmer Rouge, from 1975 to 1979. In 1975, Oeur and his family members were forced, along with millions of other residents of Phnom Penh, out of the city by the Khmer Rouge. In successive years, Oeur and his family were held in a series of six concentration camps. During this time, Oeur feigned illiteracy and destroyed his own literary manuscripts. In 1976, while captive, his wife gave birth to twin children who were murdered by state actors. He writes about this traumatic event in “The Loss of my Twins,” translated by Ken McCullough for MĀNOA: A Pacific Journal of International Writing.

== Poetics, themes, and influence ==
Oeur writes at length about his lived experience of the Cambodian genocide. Grounded in this historical and experiential context, his poems explore what it means to have one's identity effaced, or to efface one's own identity to avoid being killed. He also engages with a spirit of collective anguish left in the aftermath of the rule of the Khmer Rouge, projecting hope in light of the horror and violence he and other Cambodians were subjected to. In Sacred Vows, Oeur writes in traditional Cambodian forms and “[uses] myths, stories, and history as ironic counterpoint” to the social and political situations of 1998 Cambodia.

Yet Oeur, despite writing in traditional forms, has also offered a critical lens on the innovation and future of Cambodian form poetry: “I know these traditional forms and can write in them, which I sometimes do, but I also feel that in many ways our traditions are what allowed us to become victims—we took things for granted, we had become hidebound and ossified,” he said in a 2001 interview with The Cambodia Daily regarding his writing on the Khmer Rouge era. “And, anyway, most of what happened to people during Pol Pot cannot be expressed in the old forms; hence, there must be more open forms to capture and preserve these things.” Of his poems, Oeur has said they offer “philosophical responses in a dialogue with the tradition. I do not wish to reject that tradition or negate the tradition, just breathe life into it.” He believes his role, as a poet, is to be a “conduit of the truth,” and says that poets are “the conscience of the nation.”

Oeur has cited Walt Whitman’s "Leaves of Grass" and T.S. Eliot’s “The Waste Land” as influences for his own work.

Oeur’s memoir, Crossing Three Wildernesses, details his life story, recounting the horrors of genocide, and calling for peace and democracy. In the book, Oeur discusses “three wildernesses” that Cambodians encountered—and suffered through—during the Khmer Rouge regime: death by execution, death by disease, and death by starvation. It is the first memoir from a pre-Khmer Rouge government official.

Oeur has worked closely with American poet Ken McCullough, whom he met in the Iowa Writers Workshop while the two were classmates. McCullough is the translator of Oeur's two books, Sacred Vows and Crossing Three Wildernesses. McCullough is also the author of the lyrics for a chamber opera -- “The Krasang Tree”—a performance based on Oeur's poetry and experiences.

In 1998, Oeur was invited to give a poetry reading at the Minneapolis Center for Victims of Torture. After reading his poem “Loss of My Twins,” Oeur was approached by a female doctor from the University of Minnesota, who told him, “[...] I thought only medicine can heal the sick. But now I know poetry can also heal the sick people, in a way that heals the emotions, the psychological trauma.”
