= Ak Welsapar =

Swedish-Turkmen journalist and writer (born 1956)

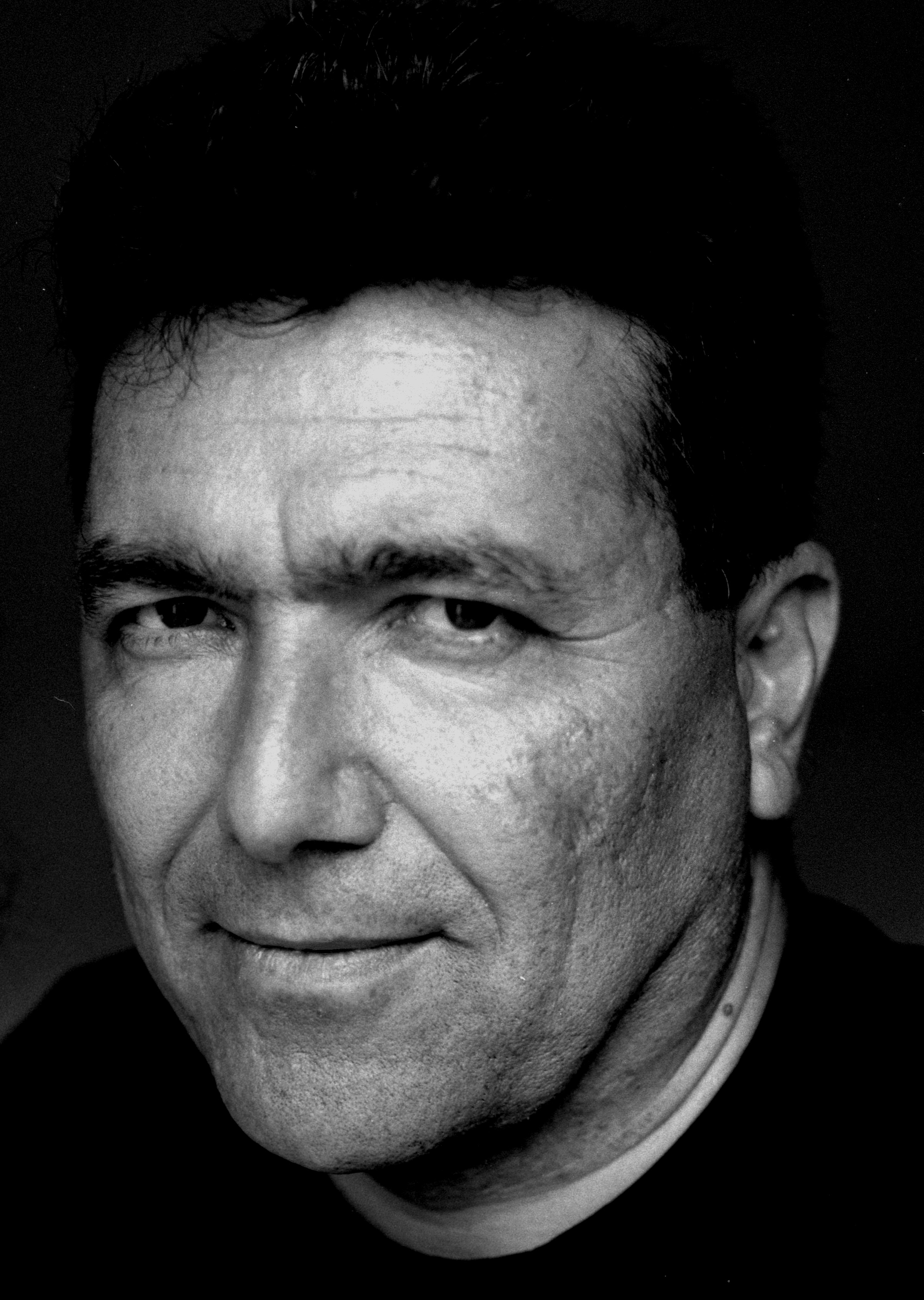
- Ak Welsapar 2007
- Born: September 19, 1956 (age 69); Mary, Turkmen SSR, USSR
- Occupations: Writer, journalist
- Writing career
- Genres: Prose, poetry
- Website: welsapar.com

Ak Welsapar (Russian: Ак Вельсапар; born September 19, 1956) is a Swedish-Turkmen journalist and writer.

In 1979, he received a Master's degree in journalism at Moscow State University. In 1989, he received a Master's degree in literary theory from Maxim Gorky Literature Institute.

As a journalist in the Turkmen Soviet Socialist Republic as well as after its declaration of independence in 1991, Welsapar published investigative works that were critical of government mismanagement. In 1992, he was placed under house arrest and later removed from both the Writers’ Union and the Union of the Journalists of Turkmenistan, with his works being banned. He left Turkmenistan for Moscow in 1993 and has lived in Sweden since 1994, where he runs Gün Förlag with his wife, printing books that have been censored by totalitarian regimes.

Welsapar writes in Turkmen, Russian and Swedish, and is the author of more than 20 books, many of which have been translated into other languages, such as English, German, Swedish, Russian and Ukrainian. His first book translated into English was his novel The Tale of Aypi, which was followed in 2018 by translations of The Revenge of the Foxes and the short stories compiled in Death of the Snake Catcher.

== Bibliography ==
=== Novels ===
- 1988 – Gawunkelle (in Turkmen). Ashgabat: Magaryf, ISBN 5-675-00185-9 [English title: The Melon Head]. Written in 1984.
- 1988 – Ahal aýak ýeterde (in Turkmen). Ashgabat: Turkmenistan, ISBN 5-8320-0263-6 [English title: A Long Journey to Nearby]. Also known as Ahal aýak astynda.
- 1988 – Aýpi hakyndaky rowaýat (in Turkmen). Moscow: Sovetsky Pisatel.
  - 2016 - The Tale of Aypi. Translated by W.M. Coulson, London: Glagoslav Publications, ISBN 978-1-78437-983-4
- 1990 – Böwsülen tümlük (in Turkmen). Ashgabat: Sowet edebiyaty, Nr 11–12, ISSN 0205-9975 [English title: This Darkness Is Brighter]
- 1991 – Köne halydaky egri gylyç (in Turkmen). Ashgabat: Yashlyk, ISSN 0235-0939 [English title: The Bent Sword on the Old Carpet]
- 1992 – Месть рода лисицы (in Russian). Ashgabat: «Ашхабад», ISSN 0320-9342
  - 2018 - The Revenge of the Foxes. Translated by Richard Govett. London: Glagoslav Publications, ISBN 1912894114
- 1996 – Mülli Tahyryň Hudaýlygy (in Turkmen). Lulea: Grafiska Huset [English title: Mulli Tahir]
- 2002 – Kepjebaş (in Turkmen). Stockholm: Författares Bokmashin, ISBN 91-974397-0-3 [English title: Cobra]

=== Short story collections ===
- 2000 – Halkyň haky (in Turkmen). Stockholm: Gün Förlag, ISBN 978-91-980352-4-7 [English title: People's Share]
- 2004 – Şor iňrik (in Turkmen). Stockholm: Gün Förlag, ISBN 91-974397-9-7 [English title: The Salty Twilight]
- 2018 – Death of the Snake Catcher. Translated by Lois Kapila, Youssef Azemoun, and Richard Govett, London: Glagoslav Publications, ISBN 978-1-911414-81-0

=== Poetry ===
- 1986 – Sepgit (in Turkmen). Ashgabat: Magaryf, I – 06848 [English title: The First Drop]
- 1996 – Ak öý (in Turkmen). Lulea: Grafiska Huset [English title: The Round House]
- 2005 – Watanym galdy (in Turkmen). Stockholm: Gün Förlag, 2005; ISBN 91-974397-6-2 [English title: Longing for Another Sky]

=== Other ===
- 1994 – Ак аждарханын йориши (in Turkmen). Moscow: Samizdat [English title: The White Dragon's Path]
- 1998 – Det nya landet. Grönt te (in Swedish). Goteborg: Lindelöws Publishing, ISBN 91-88144-36-4 [English title: The New Country]
- 2006 – Ak guş bolup uçsamdym! (children's book in Turkmen). Stockholm: Gün Förlag, ISBN 91-974397-9-7 [English title: If I Only Were a White Bird]
- 2008 – Ene dilim – öz öýüm (audiobook in Turkmen). Stockholm: Gün Förlag [English title: My Native Language – My Home]
- 2009 – Ýagtylykda ýitenler (essays in Turkmen). Stockholm: Gün Förlag, ISBN 978-91-976305-5-9 [English title: The Ones Vanishing in the Daylight].
- 2011 – Skapandet: talang och erfarenhet. I språkets hus (in Swedish). Uppsala: Kultur i Länet, ISBN 978-91-979269-2-8 [English title: Creation: The Talent and Experience]
- 2013 – Den underbara sångens hem (in Swedish). Stockholm: Gün Förlag, ISBN 978-91-976305-6-6 [English title: Home of the Wonderful Song: Fairy Tales and Legends from Turkmenistan]
- 2013 – Речной конь Дюль-Дюль (in Russian). Stockholm: Gün Förlag, ISBN 978-91-980352-2-3 [English title: Seahorse Dul-Dul]
- 2015 - Poesi för världen samman. Lyfta locket av Uppsala (in Swedish). Uppsala: Litteraturcentrum, ISBN 978-91-979269-4-2 [English title: Poetry Unites the World]

=== Individual stories ===
- 2015 - "Love History" (in English). Translated by Youssef Azemoun, London: The Magazin Xindex on Censorship, Nr 2, ISBN 978-1-4739-42196-0 [original title: "Söýgi hekaýaty"]
- 2015 - У оврага за последними домами / Gorpuň gyrasynda (in Russian and Turkmen). Stockholm: Gün Förlag, ISBN 978-91-980352-8-5 [English title: On the Edge]

== Awards and honours ==
Welsapar was awarded the Ukrainian literary prize "Triumf" (named after Nikolai Gogol) for the short stories translated into Ukrainian under the title Смарагдовий берег (The Emerald Shore) in 2014. Seven of the eight stories in this collection were included in Death of the Snake Catcher.
