= William Lerner =

American businessman and philanthropist

- Occupations: Businessman and philanthropist

William Lerner, also known as Billy Lerner, is an American businessman and philanthropist who founded his own nonprofit organization, Billy4Kids, that donates shoes to children around the world.

== Philanthropy ==
Lerner actively supports work for the prevention, management, and curing of diseases in children.

== Billy4Kids ==
Lerner is the co-founder of Billy4Kids, a non-profit organization "dedicated to helping children in need by providing them with one essential item often taken for granted: shoes." Lerner conceived the idea for Billy4Kids after reading an article about children who were dying from foot-borne diseases contracted from unprotected feet in developing countries. Billy4Kids was founded to provide underprivileged children with shoes, and to assist other charitable organizations. Donations to Billy4Kids support bulk shoe purchases which are then distributed in poverty-stricken areas of Haiti, Brazil, and Ghana.

== Family life ==
Lerner has a son.

== Other charitable work ==
Lerner is actively involved in numerous other charities and organizations.

== Awards ==
On July 16, 2014, Lerner was honored with the Humanitarian Award by host Stephen Baldwin at the 3rd Annual Edeyo Gives Hope Ball.
