= Wadih Sa'adeh =

Lebanese Australian poet (born 1948)

Wadih Sa’adeh (also Wadih Saadeh or Wadih Saadah or Wadīʻ Saʻādah) (Arabic: وديع سعادة) - Birth name: Wadih Amine STEPHAN - is a Lebanese Australian poet. He was born in Lebanon in 1948.

In 1973 he published his first poetry book written by hand, and sold it in the streets, titled "Laysa Lil Massa’ Ikhwah" (Evening Has No Brothers), which was published in 1981.

After many travelling to many countries – England, France, Greece, Cyprus – Wadih Sa’adeh immigrated to Australia in November, 1988, and has been living in Sydney since that date.

Clarissa C. Burt, Assistant Professor of Arabic in United States Naval Academy, wrote: " As a member of the new Arab diaspora, Wadih Sa'adeh's poetry bespeaks the global scope of contemporary Arabic writing, much as Jibran Khalil Jibran's writing of the first mahjar helped to the trigger aspects of modernity in Arabic literature in the twentieth century. In the course of his poetic career, Sa'adeh's work has emerged from the level of the local into the exilic, to reach the level of the existential, and thus speak not only to Arabs across the globe of this generation disaffected by repeated loss, violent upheaval and continual disenfranchisement, but to all of us about the horrors and unfulfillable longings of human existence (...) Wadih Sa'adeh's publications are truly remarkable monumental works of post modern nihilism, emerging from his experience and articulation of exile and alienation in his own life, purified and distilled to come have universal implications. The careful comparison and study of the relationship of Sa'adeh's texts with the works of Nietzsche are obviously needed to accurately gauge their similarities and divergences, and the level of intertextuality bridging between them. In addition, Sa'adeh's texts would be fruitfully compared with the corpus of Jibran Khalil Jibran, for the large structural similarities in their lives, and the major differences in the tones of their aphoristic writings. Moreover, comparing the oppositional wordplay in Sa'adeh with al-Niffari and other sufi writers will clarify to what extent Sa'adeh has borrowed from the terminology of sufi disciplines and spiritual orders to articulate his negative and nihilist message. Finally, one can only hope that this remarkable poet, this humble latter-day Arabic Nietzsche, this nihilist literary reincarnation of Jibran, this dark angel of existential exile will fail in any attempt at literary suicide, and will grace us with his sad songs, or new songs of triumph, and hope renewed in some kind of literary transcendence over the pain of existential exile, which he has so thoroughly described, explored and mapped for us all ".

== Bibliography ==
Sa’adeh has published twelve books of poetry in Arabic, some of them are translated into English, French, Spanish, Swedish and Italian.

- Laysa Lil Massa’ Ikhwah (Evening Has No Brothers), 1981.
- Al-Miah, Al-Miah (Water, Water), 1983.
- Rajul Fi Hawa’ Mustamal Yaq’ud Wa Youfakkir Fil Hayawanat (A Man in Used Air Sitting and Thinking of Animals), 1985.
- Maq’ad Rakib Ghadar al Bus (A Seat of a Passenger Who Left the Bus), 1987.
- Bisabab Ghaymah ‘Alal-Arjah (Most Likely Because of a Cloud), 1992.
- Mohawalat Wasl Dhiffatayn Bisawt, (Attempt to Connect Two Shores with Sound), 1997.
- Nass Al-Ghiyab (Text of Absence), 1999.
- Ghubar (Dust), 2001.
- Ratq ul Hawa’ (Darn of the Air), 2006.
- Tarkeeb Akhar Li Hayat Wadih Sa’adeh (Another Reconstruction of Wadih Sa’adeh's Life), 2006.
- Man Akhatha an-Nazra Allati Taraktuha Amama l Bab? (Who Took The Glance I Left Behind The Door?), 2011.
- Qull lil’Aber An Ya’oud, Nasiya Huna Zillahu (Tell the Passenger to Come Back, He Forgot his Shadow Here), 2012.

== Translations ==
- A Secret Sky: Wadih Saʿadeh, tr. Anne Fairbairn (Charnwood, A.C.T. [Australia]: Ginninderra Press, 1997), a volume of Saʿādah's poetry in English
- Articles about Wadih Saadeh's poetry and translated poems https://tenementpress.com/Wadih-Saadeh

Collections that include Sa'adeh's poetry:

- A crack in the wall : new Arab poetry. Ed. Margaret Obank and Samuel Shimon. London : Saqi Books, 2001.
- Language for a new century : contemporary poetry from the Middle East, Asia, and beyond. Ed. Tina Chang, Nathalie Handal and Ravi Shankar. New York : W.W. Norton, 2008.
- Translated book https://themarkaz.org/no-place-to-be-on-wadih-saadehs-a-horse-at-the-door/
