= Tina Chang =

American poet, teacher, and editor

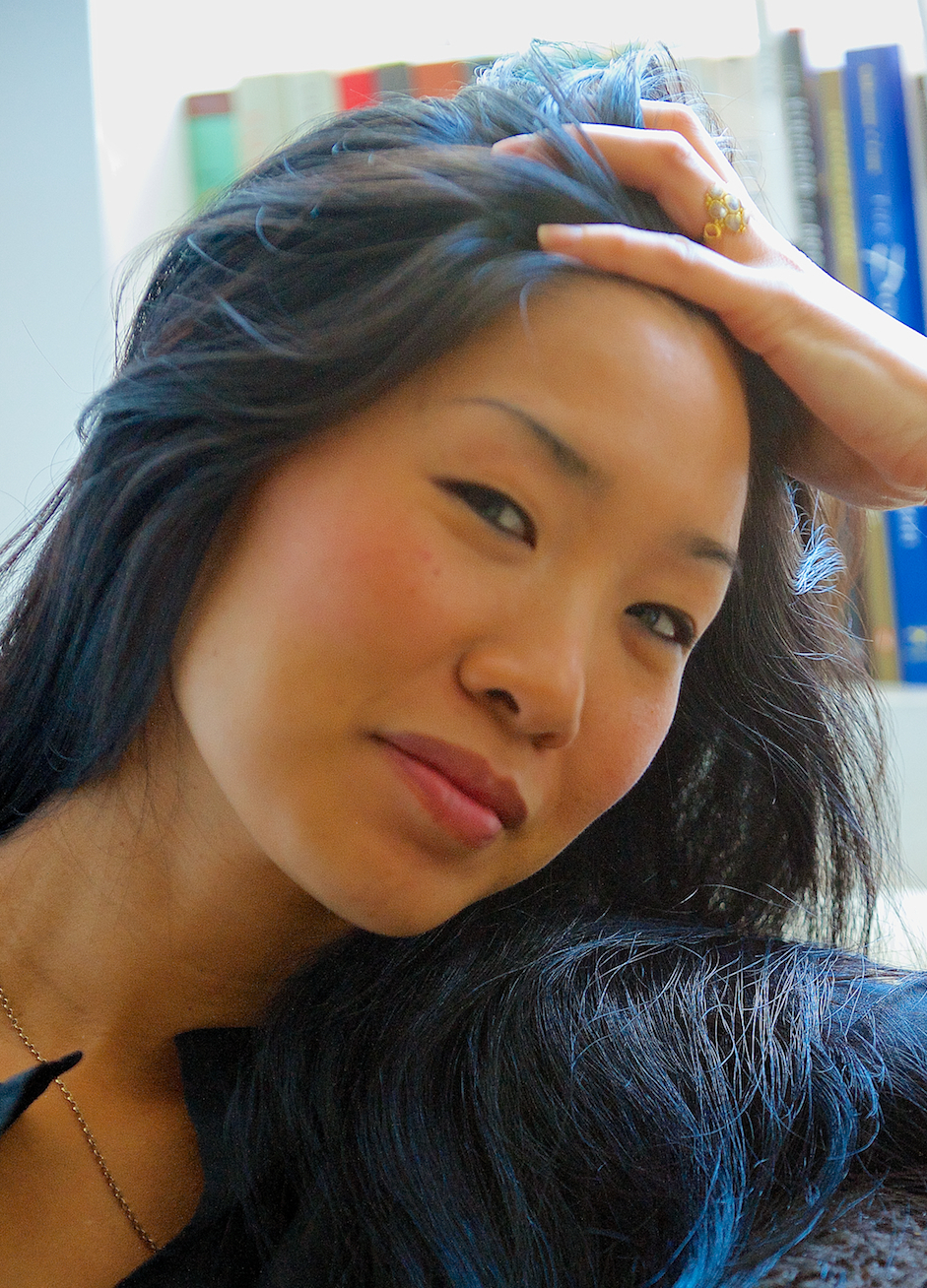
- Chang in 2011
- Born: 1969 (age 56–57); Oklahoma, United States
- Education: Binghamton University (BA); Columbia University (MFA)
- Writing career
- Language: English
- Notable works: Hybrida, Of Gods & Strangers, Half-Lit Houses, Language for a New Century: Contemporary Poetry from the Middle East, Asia and Beyond
- Website: www.tinachang.com

Tina Chang is an American poet, professor, editor, organizer, and public speaker. In 2010, she was named Poet Laureate of Brooklyn.

== Early life and education ==
Chang was born in 1969 in Oklahoma to Taiwanese immigrants, who had met in Montreal, where her mother was working as a nurse and her father was earning his doctorate in physics. The family moved to Queens, New York, when she was a year old, where she was raised except for a period during her youth, when Chang and her brother were sent to live in Taiwan with relatives for two years. "I started questioning even at a very young age, well, what is language?" she said. "What is the role of words?"

Chang earned her B.A. in English literature from Binghamton University. She received her Master of Fine Arts degree in poetry from Columbia University.

== Career ==
Since fall of 2020, Chang has served as Professor and Director of Creative Writing at her undergraduate alma mater, Binghamton University. She oversees the Binghamton Center for Writers which includes the Distinguished Writers series, Common Ground, a reading series devoted to undergraduate and graduate creative writers, the Binghamton Writers Project, the Harpur Palate literary journal, Coffee & Conversation, the Word of Mouth annual collaboration between student poets and composers, and annual literary awards.

She published four full-length collections of poetry: Half-Lit Houses (Four Way Books, 2004), Of Gods & Strangers (Four Way Books, 2011), and Hybrida (W.W. Norton, 2019) which was named a Most Anticipated Book of 2019 by The New York Times, O, The Oprah Magazine, NPR, and The Washington Post, and featured in Poets & Writers, the Los Angeles Review of Books among many other publications. It was one of five poetry collections cited by Publishers Weekly in its Best Books of 2019 issue. Along with poets Nathalie Handal and Ravi Shankar, she is the co-editor of Language for a New Century: Contemporary Poetry from the Middle East, Asia and Beyond (W.W. Norton, 2008). Her most recent poetry collection is LION (W.W. Norton, 2026).

Her work has appeared in numerous publications such as The New York Times, McSweeney's, and Ploughshares. The San Francisco Chronicle has described her poetry as "a vast, beautifully fashioned mosaic of indelible, variegated pieces." One of her chief goals is to "demystify the role of the poet."

She has held residencies at MacDowell Colony, Djerassi Artist's Residency, Vermont Studio Center, Fundacion Valparaiso, Ragdale, the Constance Saltonstall Foundation, Blue Mountain Center, and the Virginia Center for the Creative Arts.

== Awards ==
Chang was elected Brooklyn Poet Laureate in 2010. She has received grants and awards from the New York Foundation for the Arts, the Barbara Deming Memorial Foundation/Money for Women, and the Ludwig Vogelstein Foundation, the 2026 Poets & Writers Writers for Writers Award, and The Academy of American Poets's Poets Laureate Fellowship. She has also won a Dana Award for poetry. She was a finalist for an Asian American Literary Award from the Asian American Writers' Workshop, for Half-Lit Houses

== Books ==
- Half-Lit Houses. Four Way Books. 2004. ISBN 978-1884800528.
- Language for a New Century: Contemporary Poetry from the Middle East, Asia and Beyond. W. W. Norton. 2008. ISBN 978-0393332384.
- Of Gods & Strangers. Four Way Books. 2011. ISBN 978-1935536178.
- Hybrida. W. W. Norton & Company. 2019. ISBN 978-1324002482.
- LION, W.W. Norton & Company. 2026. ISBN 978-1-324-12417-7.

=== Anthologies ===
- Poetry 30: Poets in their Thirties, (MAMMOTH Books, 2005)
- Asian American Poetry: The Next Generation, (University of Illinois Press, 2004)
- Asian American Literature (McGraw-Hill, 2001)
- Identity Lessons (Penguin, 1999).
