= Nathalie Handal =

American writer

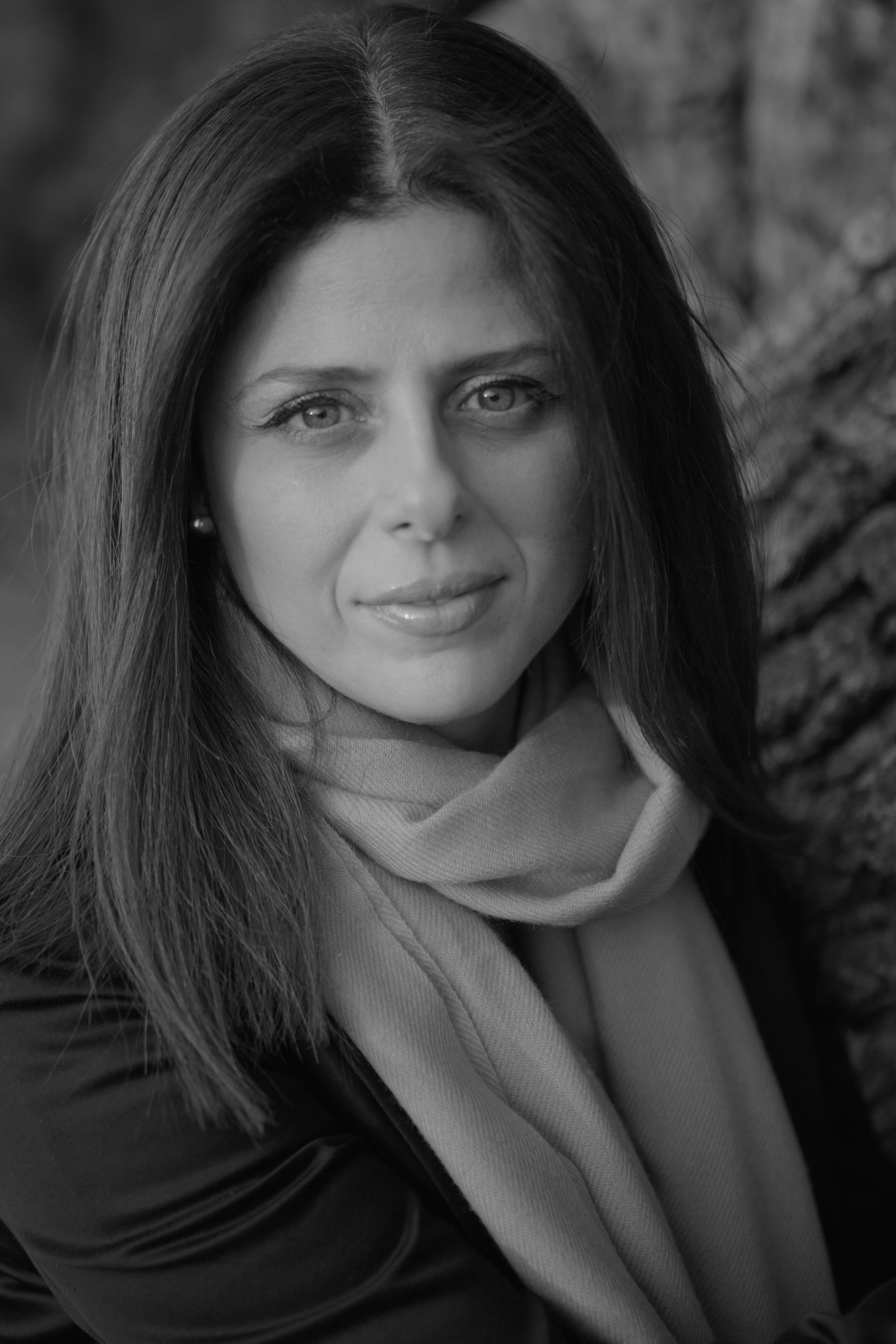
- Born: 29 July 1969 (age 57); Haiti
- Education: Bennington College, University of London
- Occupations: Poet; writer; educator
- Writing career
- Notable works: Love and Strange Horses, Poet in Andalucía, The Republics, Life in a Country Album
- Notable awards: National Endowment for the Arts, Lannan Foundation Fellow, Gold Medal Independent Publisher Book Award, PEN Oakland Josephine Miles Literary Award, Virginia Faulkner Award for Excellence in Writing
- Website: www.nathaliehandal.com

Nathalie Handal (born 29 July 1969) is a poet, writer and professor at New York University. She has published 10 books, including Life in a Country Album.

== Biography ==
Nathalie Handal is a French-American poet and writer, born in Haiti to a Mediterranean Palestinian family from Bethlehem. She has lived in France, Italy, the United States, Latin America, the Caribbean, Asia and the Arab world. After earning a MFA in Creative Writing from Bennington College, Vermont and a MPhil in English and Drama at the University of London, Handal began writing and translating global literature in the 1990s. She currently resides in New York City, Rome and Paris and teaches at New York University.

== Literary career ==
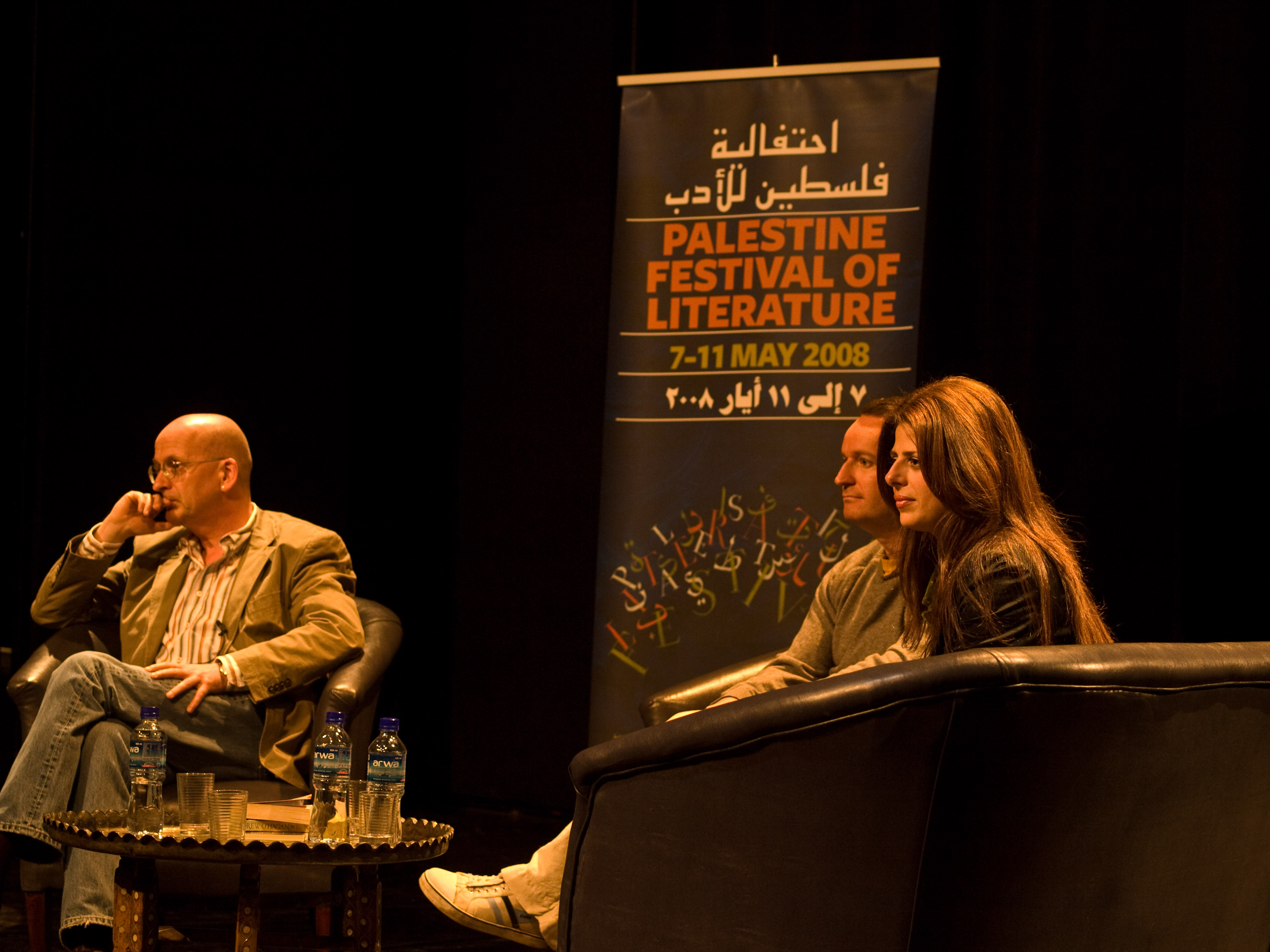
Handal with Roddy Doyle and Andrew O'Hagan at PalFest 2008 in Bethlehem.

Handal has authored books of poetry, plays, essays, and has edited two anthologies and has been involved as a writer, director, or producer in several theatrical or film productions. Her work has been translated into over fifteen languages. She is the recipient of awards from the National Endowment for the Arts, PEN Foundation, Pen International Croatia, Lannan Foundation, Fondazione di Venezia, Centro Andaluz de las Letras, Africa Institute, was honored Finalist for the Gift of Freedom Award, winner of the Alejo Zuloaga Order in Literature, and featured at the United Nations for Outstanding Contributors in literature, among others. Her work has appeared in anthologies and magazines such as Vanity Fair, The New York Times, The Guardian, The Irish Times, World Literature Today, The Virginia Quarterly Review, Poetry New Zealand, Guernica Magazine, and The Nation.

Her book The Lives of Rain was shortlisted for the Agnes Lynch Starrett Poetry Prize and received the Menada Literary Award. Love and Strange Horses won the 2011 Gold Medal Independent Publisher Book Award (IPPY Award), and was an Honorable Mention at the San Francisco Book Festival and the New England Book Festival. The flash collection The Republics was called "one of the most inventive books by one of today's most diverse writers" and is winner of the Virginia Faulkner Award for Excellence in Writing and the Arab American Book Award. And Life in a Country Album is winner of the Palestine Book Award and a Foreword Indies Book Award finalist.

Handal has edited the anthology The Poetry of Arab Women, which introduced Arab women poets to a wider audience in the West. It was an Academy of American Poets bestseller, named one of the top 10 Feminist Books by The Guardian, and it won the PEN Oakland/Josephine Miles Literary Award. She co-edited along with Tina Chang and Ravi Shankar the anthology Language for a New Century: Contemporary Poetry from the Middle East, Asia & Beyond. She has lectured or been a Visiting Writer at La Sorbonne in Paris, Ca' Foscari University of Venice, John Cabot in Rome, The American University in Beirut, Picador Guest Professor at Leipzig University, Germany, a Visiting Writer at The American University of Rome, part of the Low-Residency MFA faculty at Sierra Nevada University, and professor at Columbia University. Handal is currently a professor at New York University.

She writes the literary travel column, "The City and the Writer", for Words Without Borders magazines, and "Eat: Everywhere a Tale", for Popula.

== Publications ==
Poetry

- The Neverfield Poem (1999)
- The Lives of Rain (2005)
- Love and Strange Horses (University of Pittsburgh Press, 2010)
- Poet in Andalucía (University of Pittsburgh Press, 2012)
- The Invisible Star/La estrella invisible (Valparaíso Ediciones, 2014)
- The Republics (University of Pittsburgh Press, 2015)
- Life in a Country Album (University of Pittsburgh Press, 2019)
- Volo (Diode Editions, chapbook 2022)

Poetry / Foreign Publications

- Las horas suspendidas: poemas escogidos (Valparaíso Ediciones, 2012)
- Poeta en Andalucía (Visor, España, 2013)
- La estrella invisible (Valparaíso Ediciones, 2014)
- Riflessi, Artist Book, Illustrazioni di Lucio Schiavo (Damocle Edizioni, Venezia, 2016)
- Pjesnik u Andaluziji (Druga prica, Zagreb, 2017)
- التّلحمية Al-Talhamiyah (Jordan, 2017)
- Canto Mediterraneo (Ronzani Editore, Italia, 2018)
- Le vite della pioggia (Iacobelli Editore, Roma, Italia, 2018)
- Poet in Andalucia - Arabic (Takween, Damascus, 2019)
- Life in A Country Album - UK (flipped eye, United Kingdom 2020)
- Selected Poems: 2005-2019 (Fawasel Publishing House, Syria, 2022)
- De l'amour des étranges chevaux (Mémoire Encrier, Montreal and Paris, 03/03/2023)

Anthologies

- The Poetry of Arab Women (2001, ed. by Handal)
- Language for a New Century: Contemporary Poetry from the Middle East, Asia & Beyond (W.W. Norton, 2008, ed. by Handal, Tina Chang and Ravi Shankar)

Plays

- Between Our Lips
- La Cosa Dei Sogni
- The Stonecutters
- The Details of Silence
- The Oklahoma Quartet
- Hakawatiyeh
- Men in Verse

Prose (creative nonfiction, fiction)

- “The Night and Nightingale" Guernica Magazine, March 2017
- “My East in Venice" Guernica Magazine, April 2017
- “After Kaddish" Guernica Magazine, September 2018

CDs

- Traveling Rooms
- Spell

Interviews and Reviews

- "Mahmoud Darwish: Palestine's Poet of Exile", The Progressive, May 2002
- "Shades of a Bridge's Breath", This bridge we call home: radical visions for transformation, eds. Gloria E. Anzaldúa and Analouise Keating (Routledge, 2002). ISBN 0-415-93682-9
- "Sisterhood of Hope", interview with Zainab Salbi, Saudi Aramco World, September/October 2010
- "We Are All Going to Die", interview with Edwidge Dandicat, Guernica Magazine, January 2011
- "The Other Face of Silence", interview with Elia Suleiman, Guernica Magazine, May 2011
- "Not Quite Invisible", Nathalie Handal interviews Mark Strand, Guernica Magazine, April 2012
- "Against the Line", interview with Jonathan Galassi, Guernica Magazine, June 2012
- “Elisa Biagini: A World Reinvented Through Poetry,” Guernica Magazine, February 7, 2014
- “Kareem James Abu-Zeid: A Search for Justice and Expansive Identities," Guernica Magazine, August 2014
- “Isabella Hammad's The Parisian", Electric Literature, May 7, 2019
- “Introduction to Edwidge Danticat", 92Y, September 2019
- “Awam Amkpa: What’s Missing Will be Found," Guernica Magazine, October 2024
