= Issa Makhlouf =

Lebanese writer and poet

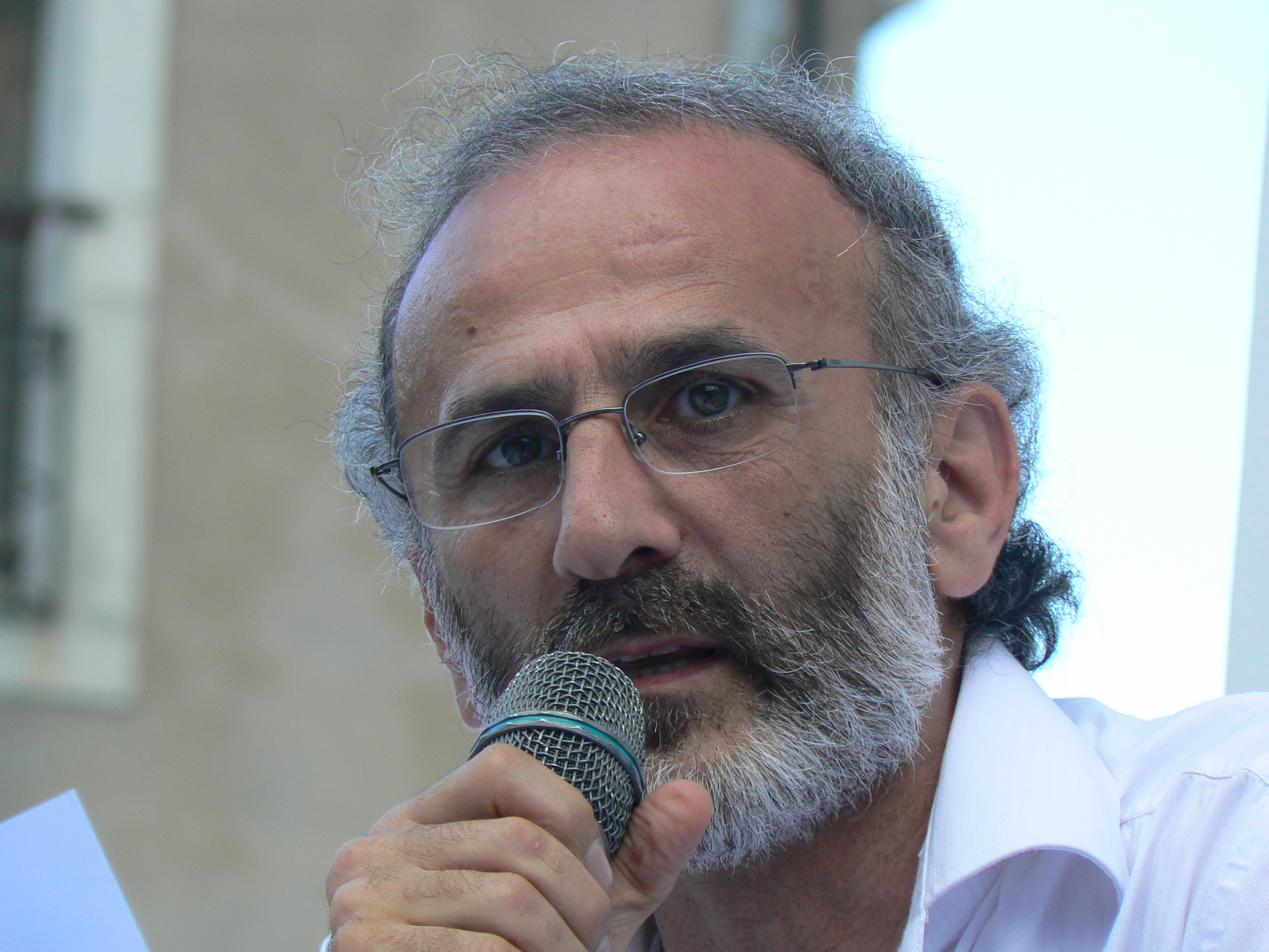
- Born: 1955 (age 70–71)
- Education: Sorbonne
- Occupations: writer and poet
- Known for: News Director at Radio Orient
- Notable work: see Partial bibliography

Issa Makhlouf (Arabic: عيسى مخلوف; born 1955) is a Lebanese writer and poet who lives in Paris where he is the News Director at Radio Orient.

He obtained a doctorate in Cultural Anthropology at the Sorbonne and was professor at the University (E.S.I.T.) Paris III. Makhlouf also was a special UN Counsellor of Cultural and Social Affairs in the 61st session of the General Assembly (2006–2007).

== Partial bibliography ==
- A Star Slowed Down in Front of Death (نجمة أمام الموت أبطأت), Ed. An-Nahar, Beirut 1981.
- Beyrut or the Fascination of Death (بيروت أو الافتتان بالموت), essay, Passion, Paris, 1988
- The Loneliness of Gold (عزلة الذهب), ed. Al-Jadid, Beyrouth, 1992
- Distractions (هيامات), ed. André Biren, Paris, 1993
- The Eye of the Mirage (عين السراب), ed. An-Nahar, Beyrouth, 2000
- Mirages, éditions José Corti, Paris, 2004
- (Letter to the Two Sisters(Lettre aux deux sœurs), ed. José Corti, 2008
- A City in the Sky, Ed. Attanwir, Beirut, 2012

=== Sources ===
(in French, English, Spanish, and Arabic) Official Website
