= Clare Pollard =

British writer (born 1978)

Clare Pollard FRSL
- Pollard in 2026
- Born: 1978 (age 47–48); Bolton, Greater Manchester, England
- Education: Cambridge University
- Known for: Poetry
- Website: clarepollard.com

Clare Eve Pollard FRSL (born 1978, England) is a British writer (poet, novelist and playwright), literary translator and (prize jury) critic. She was elected a Fellow of the Royal Society of Literature in 2024.

== Early life and education ==
Pollard was raised in Bolton. She was educated at Turton School in Bromley Cross and read English at King's College, Cambridge, graduating in 2000.

== Career ==
At age 19, Pollard published her first poetry collection, The Heavy-Petting Zoo (Bloodaxe, 1997). In 2000, Pollard won a Society of Authors Eric Gregory Award. In 2004, her play The Weather was performed at the Royal Court Theatre and also at the Munchner Kammerspiele. In 2007, My Male Muse, a radio documentary was broadcast on BBC Radio 4.

In 2009, Pollard and James Byrne edited the Bloodaxe young poets showcase titled Voice Recognition: 21 Poets for the 21st Century. Pollard has been a Royal Literary Fund Writing Fellow at Essex University. In 2013, she was the judge for the inaugural international Hippocrates Prize for Young Poets, and she has since judged the Poetry Book Society Next Generation list, Popescu European Poetry Translation Prize, Manchester International Poetry Prize, the Northern Writer's Awards and the T. S. Eliot Prize.

From 2017 to 2022 she was the editor of Modern Poetry in Translation. Thereafter, she began to work as artistic director of the Winchester Poetry Festival. In 2022, her poem Pollen was shortlisted for the Forward Prize for Best Single Poem 2022. In that same year, she published her debut novel, Delphi, with Fig Tree in the UK, with Avid Reader in the US, and Aufbau Verlag in Germany. The novel's plot centres on social satire concerning oracles, tarot cards and London family life during the 2020 Covid lockdown, and the corresponding shift of everyday life towards the internet; the protagonist of the novel is a struggling classics professor, wife and mother facing a failing marriage, attempting to care for her ten-year-old son whilst holding her family together "against all odds".

Pollard's debut children's book, The Untameables, a radical retelling of Arthurian myth and legend, was published in 2024 by the Emma Press.

== Private life ==
As of 2023, Pollard lives in South London with her husband and two children.

== Selected bibliography ==
=== Novels ===
- —— (2022). Delphi.
- —— (2024). The Modern Fairies. Simon and Schuster. ISBN 978-1-6680-4941-9.

=== Children's books ===
- The Untameables (2023)
- The Othernauts (2026)

=== Poetry collections ===
- The Heavy-Petting Zoo (1998)
- Bedtime (2002)
- Look, Clare! Look! (2005)
- Changeling (2011)
- Incarnation (2017). Bloodaxe.
- The Lives of the Female Poets (2019) Bad Betty Press.

=== Nonfiction ===
- Fierce Bad Rabbits: The Tales Behind Children's Picture Books (2019). Fig Tree.

=== Plays ===
- The Weather (2004). Faber.
- Ovid's Heroines (2013).

=== Anthologies edited ===
- Voice Recognition: 21 Poets for the 21st Century (2009).
