= Partaw Naderi =

Poet from Afghanistan

Partaw Naderi پرتو نادری
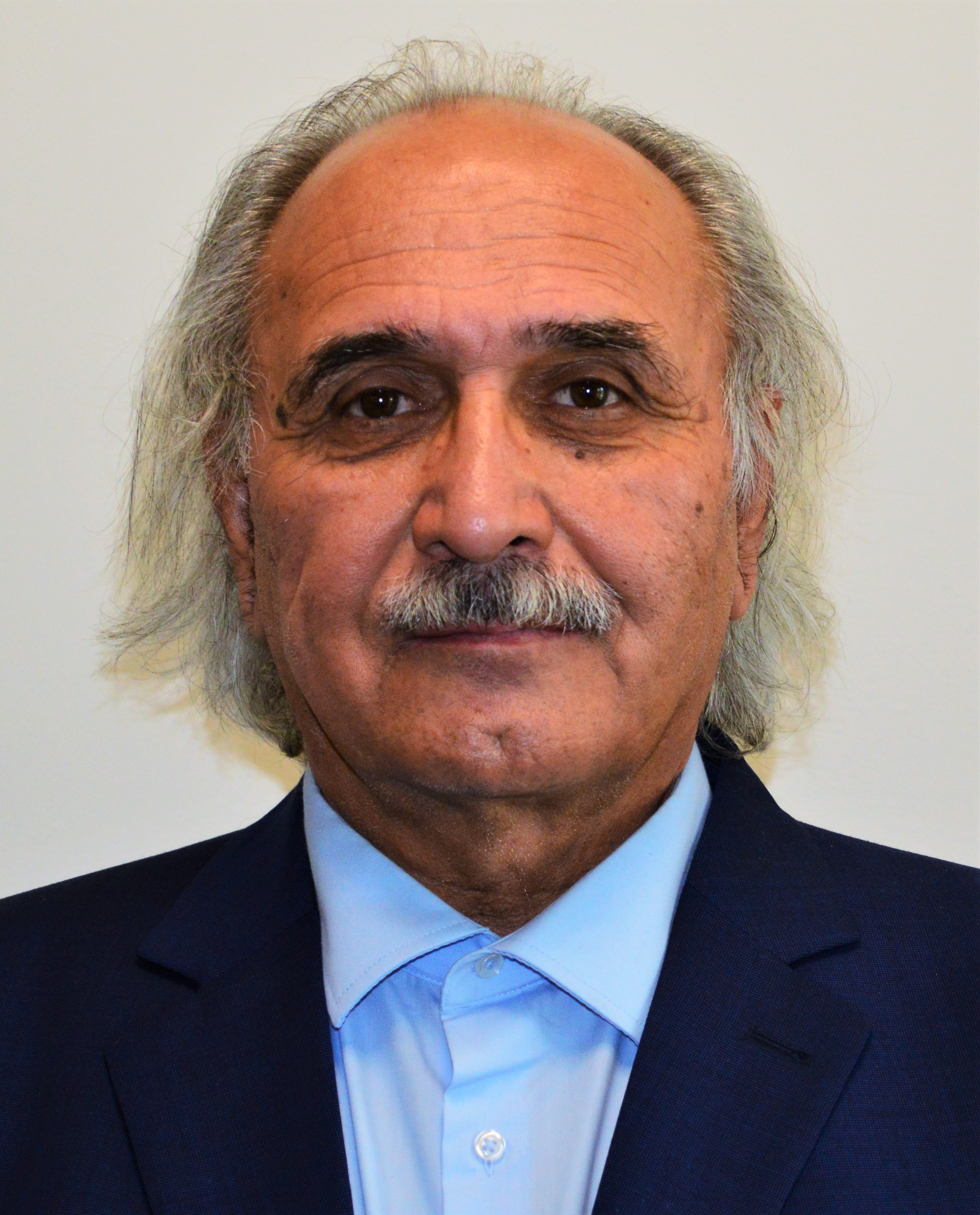
- Partaw Naderi
- Born: 1953 (age 72–73); Badakhshan, Afghanistan
- Occupations: Activism, poet and author

Partaw Naderi (Persian: پرتو نادری) is a social activist, author and poet from Afghanistan.

== Early life ==
Partaw Naderi was born in 1953 in Badakhshan Province of Afghanistan. He is an ethnic Tajik. In 1968, he moved to Kabul and studied at the Teachers' Training College, and then at the Faculty of Natural Sciences. It was during these years that he published his first poems in various literary magazines in Kabul.
